= List of flag bearers for Laos at the Olympics =

Laos at the Olympics
- IOC code: LAO
- NOC: National Olympic Committee of Lao
- Medals: Gold 0 Silver 0 Bronze 0 Total 0

Summer appearances
- 1980; 1984; 1988; 1992; 1996; 2000; 2004; 2008; 2012; 2016; 2020; 2024

This is a list of flag bearers who have represented Laos at the Olympics.

Flag bearers carry the national flag of their country at the opening ceremony of the Olympic Games.

#	Event year	Season	Flag bearer	Sport
1	1980	Summer	Panh Khemanith	Athletics
2	1988	Summer	Sitthixay Sacpraseuth	Athletics
3	1992	Summer	Khamsavath Vilayphone	Boxing
4	1996	Summer	Thongdy Amnouayphone	Athletics
5	2000	Summer	Sisomphone Vongpharkdy	Athletics
6	2004	Summer	Chamleunesouk Ao Oudomphonh	Athletics
7	2008	Summer	Souksavanh Tonsacktheva	Athletics
8	2012	Summer	Kilakone Siphonexay	Athletics
9	2016	Summer	Xaysa Anousone	Athletics
10	2020	Summer	Santisouk Inthavong	Swimming
10	2020	Summer	Silina Pha Aphay	Athletics
11	2024	Summer	Steven Insixiengmay	Swimming
11	2024	Summer	Silina Pha Aphay	Athletics

== See also ==
- Laos at the Olympics
