= List of Laotian records in athletics =

The following are the national records in athletics in Laos maintained by the Lao Amateur Athletic Federation (LAAF).

== Outdoor ==
Key to tables: Awaiting ratification Record not kept by LAAF

ht = hand timing
A = affected by altitude
NWI = no wind measurement
OT = oversized track (> 200m in circumference)

=== Men ===
Event	Record	Athlete	Date	Meet	Place	Ref.
100 m	10.97 NWI	Anousone Xaysa	18/20 September 2014		Vientiane, Laos	
100 m	10.81 (+0.1 m/s)	Sorsy Phompakdi	28 November 2022	Thailand International Open Championships	Pathumthani, Thailand	
100 m	10.87 NWI	Xaidavanh Vongsavanh	12 May 2023	Southeast Asian Games	Phnom Penh, Cambodia	
100 m	10.74 (−0.2 m/s)	Sorsy Phomphakdi	29 September 2023	Asian Games	Hangzhou, China	
200 m	21.97 NWI	Anousone Xaysa	11 December 2014		Oudomxay, Laos	
200 m	21.92 NWI	Sorsy Phomphakdi	8 May 2023	Southeast Asian Games	Phnom Penh, Cambodia	
400 m	49.73	Kingkeo Inthavong	24 August 2017	Southeast Asian Games	Bukit Jalil, Malaysia	
800 m	1:57.97	Khambieng Khamiar	24 November 1989		Bangkok, Thailand	
1500 m	4:04.82	Khambieng Khamiar	3 August 1992	Olympic Games	Barcelona, Spain	
3000 m	10:11.54	Khammouaoue Javue	23 February 2007		Vientiane, Laos	
5000 m	15:10.2	Kainchanh	6 November 2000		Vientiane, Laos	
5 km (road)	17:17+	Lamphone Xayyathee	15 February 2026	Khonkaen21	Khon Kaen, Thailand	
10,000 m	31:52.66	Sinlasone Sanith	21 August 1996	World Junior Championships	Sydney, Australia	
10 km (road)	34:38+	Lamphone Xayyathee	15 February 2026	Khonkaen21	Khon Kaen, Thailand	
15 km (road)	55:47+	Lamphone Xayyathee	11 January 2026	Khon Kaen International Marathon	Khon Kaen, Thailand	
20 km (road)	1:08:14+	Lamphone Xayyathee	15 February 2026	Khonkaen21	Khon Kaen, Thailand	
Half marathon	1:11:40	Lamphone Xayyathee	15 February 2026	Khonkaen21	Khon Kaen, Thailand	
25 km (road)	1:30:58+	Lamphone Xayyathee	11 January 2026	Khon Kaen International Marathon	Khon Kaen, Thailand	
30 km (road)	1:49:08+	Lamphone Xayyathee	11 January 2026	Khon Kaen International Marathon	Khon Kaen, Thailand	
Marathon	2:43:45	Sysavath Thammavongchit	24 February 2013		Vientiane, Laos	
Marathon	2:33:51	Lamphone Xayyathee	11 January 2026	Khon Kaen International Marathon	Khon Kaen, Thailand	
110 m hurdles	13.96 (+0.3 m/s)	Anousone Xaysa	12 June 2017	Thailand Open	Bangkok, Thailand	
400 m hurdles	56.09	Kingkeo Inthavong	27 April 2017	Singapore Open	Singapore	
3000 m steeplechase	9:37.41	Sysavath Thammavongchit	12 June 2015	Southeast Asian Games	Kallang, Singapore	
High jump	1.90 m	Phougern Inthara	2007		Vientiane, Laos	
Pole vault	4.00 m	Novome Ying Yong	12 October 2009		Vientiane, Laos	
Long jump	7.71 m (+1.7 m/s)	Xaidavahn Vongsavanh	15 July 2023	Asian Championships	Bangkok, Thailand	
Triple jump	15.74 m	Phouphet Singbandith	2 June 1990	CIF California State Meet	Norwalk, United States	
Shot put	12.20 m	Bounhome Siliphone	6 November 2000		Vientiane, Laos	
Discus throw	36.41 m	Souvanhna Phouthon	16 December 2009	Southeast Asian Games	Vientiane, Laos	
Hammer throw						
Javelin throw	61.07 m	Khongma Korakant	15 December 2009	Southeast Asian Games	Vientiane, Laos	
Decathlon	6298 pts	Oudomsack Chanthavong	13–14 December 2009	Southeast Asian Games	Vientiane, Laos	
Decathlon	100m / Long jump / Shot put / High jump / 400m / 110m H / Discus / Pole vault / Javelin / 1500m; 11.25 / 6.73 m / 10.16 m / 1.89 m / 51.86 / 15.41 / 26.18 m / 3.70 m / 45.28 m / 4:58.84					
10,000m walk (track)						
20 km walk (road)	1:48:01	Saleumphol Sopraseuth	February 1997		Luang Prabang, Laos	
50 km walk (road)						
4 × 100 m relay	41.64	Laos; Nanthavath Khentanone	25 August 2017	Southeast Asian Games	Bukit Jalil, Malaysia	
4 × 100 m relay	41.44	Laos; Deuanpheng Xayyapheat; Kongkham Kheuabmavong; Sorsy Phomphakdi; Xaidavanh Vongsavanh	10 May 2023	Southeast Asian Games	Phnom Penh, Cambodia	
4 × 400 m relay	3:23.67	K. Kountavong; K. Siphonexay; S. Chansombat; S. Souvannavong	18 December 2012		Vientiane, Laos	

=== Women ===
Event	Record	Athlete	Date	Meet	Place	Ref.
100 m	12.31 (−0.1 m/s)	Silina Phaaphay	8 December 2019	Southeast Asian Games	New Clark City, Philippines	
200 m	25.37 (±0.0 m/s)	Silina Phaaphay	7 December 2019	Southeast Asian Games	New Clark City, Philippines	
400 m	1:01.90	Dalivanh Detthonthip	13 December 1998	Asian Games	Bangkok, Thailand	
800 m	2:15.75	Lodkeo Inthakoumman	15 July 2016	ASEAN University Games	Singapore, Singapore	
1500 m	4:33.95	Lodkeo Inthakoumman	14 May 2022	Southeast Asian Games	Hanoi, Vietnam	
3000 m	11:01.82	Sirivanh Ketavong	15 December 1995	Southeast Asian Games	Chiang Mai, Thailand	
5000 m	17:36.05	Lodkeo Inthakoumman	8 May 2023	Southeast Asian Games	Phnom Penh, Cambodia	
5 km (road)	20:52+ Mx	Lalida Maokhamphiou	12 October 2025	Chicago Marathon	Chicago, United States	
10,000 m	37:24.85	Lodkeo Inthakoumman	27 April 2023	Singapore Open Championships	Kallang, Singapore	
10 km (road)	41:40+ Mx	Lalida Maokhamphiou	12 October 2025	Chicago Marathon	Chicago, United States	
15 km (road)	1:02:10+ Mx	Lalida Maokhamphiou	12 October 2025	Chicago Marathon	Chicago, United States	
20 km (road)	1:22:32*+ Mx (Note: estimate)	Lalida Maokhamphiou	12 October 2025	Chicago Marathon	Chicago, United States	
Half marathon	1:19:22	Lodkeo Inthakoumman	27 January 2024		Buriram, Thailand	
25 km (road)	1:43:04+ Mx	Lalida Maokhamphiou	12 October 2025	Chicago Marathon	Chicago, United States	
30 km (road)	2:03:32+ Mx	Lalida Maokhamphiou	12 October 2025	Chicago Marathon	Chicago, United States	
Marathon	3:25:16	Sirivanh Ketavong	28 July 1996	Olympic Games	Atlanta, United States	
Marathon	2:52:57 Mx	Lalida Maokhamphiou	12 October 2025	Chicago Marathon	Chicago, United States	
100 m hurdles	14.40 (+0.7 m/s)	Manivanh Chanthavong	26 August 2017	Southeast Asian Games	Bukit Jalil, Malaysia	
400 m hurdles	1:08.12	Toly Phengphalang	18/20 September 2014		Vientiane, Laos	
3000 m steeplechase						
High jump	1.58 m	Phommasane Khammone	6 November 2000		Vientiane, Laos	
Pole vault	2.40 m	Soutsada Siliphonphanh	8 September 2015		Bangkok, Thailand	
Long jump	5.75 m (−0.1 m/s)	Laenly Phoutthavong	25 August 2017	Southeast Asian Games	Bukit Jalil, Malaysia	
Triple jump	12.77 m (NWI)	Laenly Phoutthavong	20 September 2014		Vientiane, Laos	
Shot put	11.02 m	Soudphasone Phanvatvongsouk	2009		Vientiane, Laos	
Discus throw	34.98 m	Phonexai Paosavad	19 December 2013	Southeast Asian Games	Naypyidaw, Myanmar	
Hammer throw	35.84 m	Math Thinmanao	6 September 2015		Bangkok, Thailand	
Javelin throw	45.35 m	Math Thinmanao	8 September 2015		Bangkok, Thailand	
Heptathlon	4013 pts	Manivanh Chanthavong	24–25 August 2017	Southeast Asian Games	Bukit Jalil, Malaysia	
Heptathlon	100m H / High jump / Shot put / 200m / Long jump / Javelin / 800m; 14.70 (−0.2 m/s) / 1.56 m / 8.28 m / 27.40 (±0.0 m/s) / 5.08 m (±0.0 m/s) / 17.36 m / 2:44.29					
10,000 m walk (track)	1:04:50.25	Bongone Vanmany	7 July 2016		Bangkok, Thailand	
20 km walk (road)	2:21:02	Manilat Phamesethong	15 December 2009	Southeast Asian Games	Vientiane, Laos	
50 km walk (road)						
4 × 100 m relay	49.22	Laos; Silina Pha Aphay; Lanly Phoutthavong; Boudsady Vongdala; Manevanh Chanthavong	16 July 2016	ASEAN University Games	Singapore, Singapore	
4 × 400 m relay	4:09.19	Laos	18/20 September 2014		Vientiane, Laos	

== Indoor ==
=== Men ===
Event	Record	Athlete	Date	Meet	Place	Ref.
60 m	7.04	Sorsy Phompakdi	21 March 2025	World Championships	Nanjing, China	
200 m	27.51	Soukhaseum Southivong	6 December 2015		Eaubonne, France	
400 m	51.70	Khenmanh Chantavong	31 October 2009	Asian Indoor Games	Hanoi, Vietnam	
800 m	2:02.61	Saysana Bannavong	1 November 2009	Asian Indoor Games	Hanoi, Vietnam	
1000 m	2:55.00	Oudomsack Chanthavong	2 November 2009	Asian Indoor Games	Hanoi, Vietnam	
1500 m	4:18.17	Saysana Bannavong	15 November 2005	Asian Indoor Games	Pattaya, Thailand	
3000 m	9:38.37 (Note: outdoor mark ratified as absolute record)	Sayphone Losavanh	14 November 2005	Asian Indoor Games	Pattaya, Thailand	
60 m hurdles	8.58	Oudomsack Chanthavong	2 November 2009	Asian Indoor Games	Hanoi, Vietnam	
High jump	1.85 m	Oudomsack Chanthavong	1 November 2009	Asian Indoor Games	Hanoi, Vietnam	
Pole vault						
Long jump	6.45 m	Oudomsack Chantavong	1 November 2009	Asian Indoor Games	Hanoi, Vietnam	
Triple jump	15.15 m	Phouphet Singbandith	23 February 1991		Columbia United States	
Shot put	8.32 m	Oudomsack Chanthavong	1 November 2009	Asian Indoor Games	Hanoi, Vietnam	
Heptathlon	4069 pts	Oudomsack Chanthavong	1-2 November 2009	Asian Indoor Games	Hanoi, Vietnam	
Heptathlon	60m / Long jump / Shot put / High jump / 60m H / Pole vault / 1000m; 7.31 / 6.45 m / 8.32 m / 1.85 m / 8.58 / NM / 2:55.00					
5000 m walk						
4 × 400 m relay						

=== Women ===
Event	Record	Athlete	Date	Meet	Place	Ref.
60 m	8.16	Phody Sithideth	31 October 2009	Asian Indoor Games	Hanoi, Vietnam	
200 m						
400 m						
800 m	2:31.04	Souksavanh Malivanh	2 November 2009	Asian Indoor Games	Hanoi, Vietnam	
1500 m						
3000 m						
60 m hurdles						
High jump	1.41 m	Philaylack Sackpaseuth	31 October 2009	Asian Indoor Games	Hanoi, Vietnam	
Pole vault	3.00 m	Toukta Khamboonheung	31 October 2009	Asian Indoor Games	Hanoi, Vietnam	
Long jump	5.00 m	Philaylack Sackpaseuth	31 October 2009	Asian Indoor Games	Hanoi, Vietnam	
Triple jump						
Shot put	8.74 m	Philaylack Sackpaseuth	31 October 2009	Asian Indoor Games	Hanoi, Vietnam	
Pentathlon	1979 pts	Philaylack Sackpaseuth	31 October 2009	Asian Indoor Games	Hanoi, Vietnam	
Pentathlon	60m H / High jump / Shot put / Long jump / 800m; DNF / 1.41 m / 8.74 m / 5.00 m / 2:51.13					
3000 m walk						
4 × 400 m relay	4:40.97	Laos; Phetsamone Paseuthsay; Philaylack Sackpaseuth; Phody Sithideth; Sayloung Inthavong	12 February 2006	Asian Championships	Pattaya, Thailand	
