= June 1989 =

Month of 1989

<<	June 1989					>>
Su	Mo	Tu	We	Th	Fr	Sa
				1	2	3
4	5	6	7	8	9	10
11	12	13	14	15	16	17
18	19	20	21	22	23	24
25	26	27	28	29	30

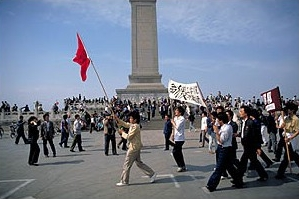
June 2, 1989: Protests in Tiananmen Square, Beijing

The following events occurred in June 1989:

== June 1, 1989 (Thursday) ==
- Pope John Paul II began a 10-day trip to Norway, Iceland, Finland, Denmark and Sweden. He arrived in Norway on June 1 and left on June 3, visiting Oslo, Trondheim and Tromsø.
- A farmer discovered the burned remains of German security hacker Karl Koch in a forest near Celle, Lower Saxony, West Germany. Despite the unusual circumstances, Koch, who had sold computer data from military and aerospace companies to the KGB, was determined to have committed suicide by self-immolation on May 23.
- During the night of June 1–2, American serial killer Oba Chandler raped 36-year-old Joan Rogers and her 17- and 14-year-old daughters Michelle and Christe and then murdered them by throwing them, alive, into Tampa Bay, Florida, weighted with concrete blocks.
- Born:
  - Hadiza Aliyu, Nigerian actress and filmmaker; in Libreville, Gabon
  - Nataliya Goncharova, Russian Olympic volleyball player; in Skole, Lviv Oblast, Ukrainian Soviet Socialist Republic, Soviet Union
  - Sammy Alex Mutahi, Kenyan long-distance runner
- Died:
  - Irena Dubiska, 89, Polish violinist
  - Aurelio Lampredi, 71, Italian automobile and aircraft engine designer
  - Martin Zoborosky (a.k.a. Martin Edwards), 72, Canadian professional ice hockey defenceman who played one game in the National Hockey League

== June 2, 1989 (Friday) ==
- Sōsuke Uno succeeded Noboru Takeshita as Prime Minister of Japan.
- 18-year-old Tina Bell disappeared in Billingham, England. Her remains would be found in April 1990 on wasteland at ICI Billingham. As of 2019, Bell's murder would remain unsolved.
- The Uniroyal Chemical Co. announced a voluntary halt to sales in the United States of the chemical Alar, used to improve the shelf life and color of apples. Studies had linked Alar with tumor development in lab animals.
- Born:
  - Freddy Adu, American soccer player; in Tema, Ghana
  - Liviu Antal, Romanian footballer; in Șimleu Silvaniei, Romania
  - Davide Appollonio, Italian professional road bicycle racer; in Isernia, Molise, Italy
  - Dean Burmester, South African professional golfer; in Mutare, Zimbabwe
  - Austin Davis, National Football League quarterback and coach; in Meridian, Mississippi
  - Cooper Helfet, National Football League tight end; in Kentfield, California
  - Alex Love, American flyweight boxer; in Monroe, Washington
  - Willy Moon (born William George Sinclair), New Zealand musician, singer and songwriter; in Wellington, New Zealand
  - Kilakone Siphonexay, Laotian Olympic sprinter; in Vientiane, Laos
  - Steve Smith, Australian cricketer; in Sydney, New South Wales, Australia
  - Darius van Driel, Dutch professional golfer; in Leidschendam, Netherlands
  - Shane Yarran, Australian rules footballer; in Seville Grove, Western Australia (d. 2018, suicide)
  - Nanda Zulmi, Indonesian footballer (d. 2017)
- Died:
  - Ted à Beckett, 81, Australian cricketer, Australian rules footballer and solicitor
  - Guido Agosti, 87, Italian pianist and piano teacher
  - Dick Mayer (born Alvin Richard Mayer), 64, American professional golfer
  - Takeo Watanabe, 56, Japanese musician and composer, died of cancer.

== June 3, 1989 (Saturday) ==
- The world's first high-definition television (test) broadcasts commenced in Japan, in analogue.
- Dissolution of the Soviet Union: The Fergana massacre began in the Fergana Valley, Uzbek Soviet Socialist Republic, Soviet Union. By the time the massacre ended on June 12, at least 97 Meskhetian Turks had been killed and over 1000 wounded by Uzbek extremists.
- Pope John Paul II arrived in Iceland, visiting Reykjavík and Þingvellir before leaving on June 4.
- The SkyDome, the world's first retractable roof stadium, opened in Downtown Toronto, Ontario, Canada.
- Born:
  - Nicole Della Monica, Italian Olympic pair skater; in Trescore Balneario, Province of Bergamo, Italy
  - Megumi Han, Japanese actress; in Tokyo, Japan
  - Katie Hoff, American Olympic swimmer; in Abingdon, Maryland
  - Artem Kravets, Ukrainian footballer; in Dniprodzerzhynsk, Ukrainian SSR, Soviet Union
  - Imogen Poots, British actress; in London, England
  - Viengsavanh Sayyaboun, Laotian footballer; in Vientiane, Laos
  - Anthony Taugourdeau, French footballer; in Marseille, France
  - Daniela Vega, Chilean actress and opera singer; in San Miguel, Santiago Province, Chile
- Died:
  - Jack Belden (born Alfred Goodwin Belden), 79, American war correspondent, died of lung cancer.
  - Ruhollah Khomeini, 86 or 89, Iranian philosopher, politician, revolutionary and Shia Muslim religious leader, 1st Supreme Leader of Iran, founder of the Islamic Republic of Iran, died from surgical complications and heart failure.

== June 4, 1989 (Sunday) ==
- A violent military crackdown took place on pro-democracy protesters in Tiananmen Square, Beijing.
- The news of the death of Ayatollah Khomeini was announced to the people of Iran at 7:00 a.m. by Mohammad Reza Hayati, one of the veteran news anchors of Islamic Republic of Iran Broadcasting (IRIB) tv1 and IRIB radio Iran. After hearing the news, people mourned on the streets and highways in Tehran and other cities. The text of the news of Ayatollah Khomeini's death on Radio Iran: "At 7:00 AM, this is Tehran, the voice of the Islamic Republic of Iran, in the name of Allah, the Most Merciful, the Most Merciful, inna lleh wa inna aliyeh rajiyun, the high spirit of the leader of the Muslims and the leader of the free people of the world, Imam Khomeini, has joined the kingdom of Allah." At 9:00 a.m., Ali Khamenei, the President of Iran, began reading Khomeini's last will and testament to the Assembly of Experts. In the afternoon the Assembly elected Khamenei as Supreme Leader (rahbar).
- An explosion near Ufa, Russian Soviet Federative Socialist Republic, Soviet Union, killed 575 as two trains passing each other threw sparks near a leaky natural gas pipeline. The disaster received relatively little media attention, possibly due to Soviet censorship and the other major news events of the day.
- Solidarity's victory in the first round of the 1989 Polish legislative election was the first of many anti-communist revolutions in Central and Eastern Europe.
- A giant wave struck the trimaran Rose-Noëlle, carrying four men from New Zealand on an adventure trip to Tonga, flipping it upside-down. The men would drift at sea for 119 days before winds and currents carried the wrecked yacht in a loop to Great Barrier Island.
- Pope John Paul II arrived in Finland, visiting Helsinki and Turku before leaving on June 6.
- The bodies of Joan, Michelle and Christe Rogers were found floating in Tampa Bay.
- American driver Dale Earnhardt won the 1989 Budweiser 500 stock car race at Dover Downs International Speedway in Dover, Delaware.
- The V International AIDS Conference began in Montreal, Quebec, Canada. It would continue through June 9.
- At the 43rd Tony Awards, The Heidi Chronicles won the award for Best Play, while Jerome Robbins' Broadway won the award for Best Musical.
- Born:
  - Paweł Fajdek, Polish Olympic hammer thrower; in Świebodzice, Poland
  - Eldar Gasimov, Azerbaijani singer (Ell & Nikki); in Baku, Azerbaijan Soviet Socialist Republic, Soviet Union
  - Bernard Le Roux, South African-born French rugby union player; in Moorreesburg, Western Cape, South Africa
- Died:
  - Dik Browne, 71, American cartoonist, died of cancer.
  - Vernon Cracknell, 77, New Zealand politician

== June 5, 1989 (Monday) ==
- An unknown Chinese protester, "Tank Man", stood in front of a column of military tanks on Chang'an Avenue in Beijing, temporarily halting them, an incident which achieved iconic status internationally through images taken by Western photographers.
- Eight people were killed, and hundreds injured, in a human crush during the viewing of Ayatollah Khomeini's body at the Musalla in Tehran.
- Born:
  - Cam Atkinson, American National Hockey League right winger; in Riverside, Connecticut
  - Mónica Castaño, Colombian beauty queen and model
  - Roxana Cocoș, Romanian Olympic weightlifter; in Bucharest, Romania
  - Ed Davis, National Basketball Association player; in Washington, D.C.
  - Megumi Nakajima, Japanese voice actress and singer; in Mito, Ibaraki, Japan
- Died: Maurice Philippe, 57, British aircraft and Formula One car designer

== June 6, 1989 (Tuesday) ==
- Japanese serial killer Tsutomu Miyazaki murdered 5-year-old Ayako Nomoto. Over the next two days he would engage in sexual acts with the girl's corpse and take photos and videos of it.

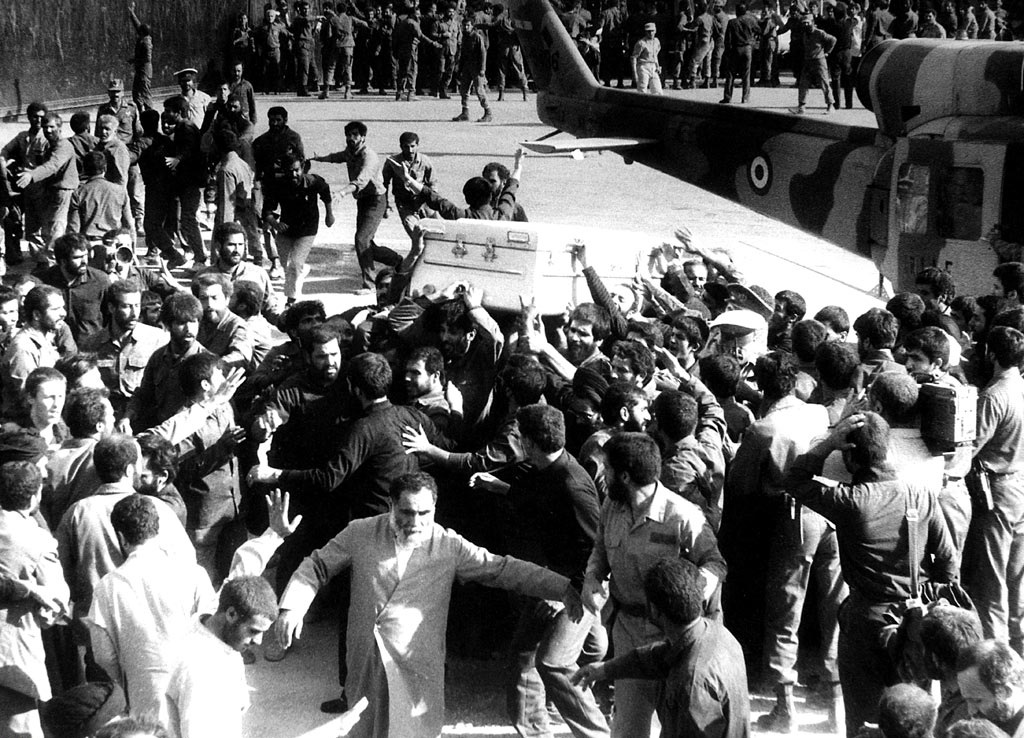
Mourners carry Ayatollah Khomeini's coffin

- Officials aborted the Ayatollah Khomeini's first funeral in Tehran after a large crowd stormed the funeral procession, nearly destroying Khomeini's wooden casket in order to get a last glimpse of his body. At one point, the body almost fell to the ground, as the crowd attempted to grab pieces of the death shroud. The Ayatollah's body had to be returned for the burial preparations to be repeated, before being brought back to the cemetery a few hours later.
- Pope John Paul II arrived in Denmark, visiting Åsebakken Priory, Roskilde, Copenhagen and Øm before leaving on June 7.
- Democratic Representative Tom Foley of Washington was elected Speaker of the United States House of Representatives, defeating Republican Representative Robert H. Michel by a vote of 251–164. The Speaker's chair had been vacated by the resignation of Jim Wright due to a scandal.
- In professional basketball, the 1989 NBA Finals began between the Detroit Pistons and the Los Angeles Lakers.
- Born:
  - Bryn McAuley, Canadian actress; in Toronto, Ontario, Canada
  - Robert Sacre, American-Canadian National Basketball Association player; in Baton Rouge, Louisiana

== June 7, 1989 (Wednesday) ==
- The British government announced that it would sell the Short Brothers aerospace company, the largest employer in Northern Ireland, to the Canadian company Bombardier Inc.

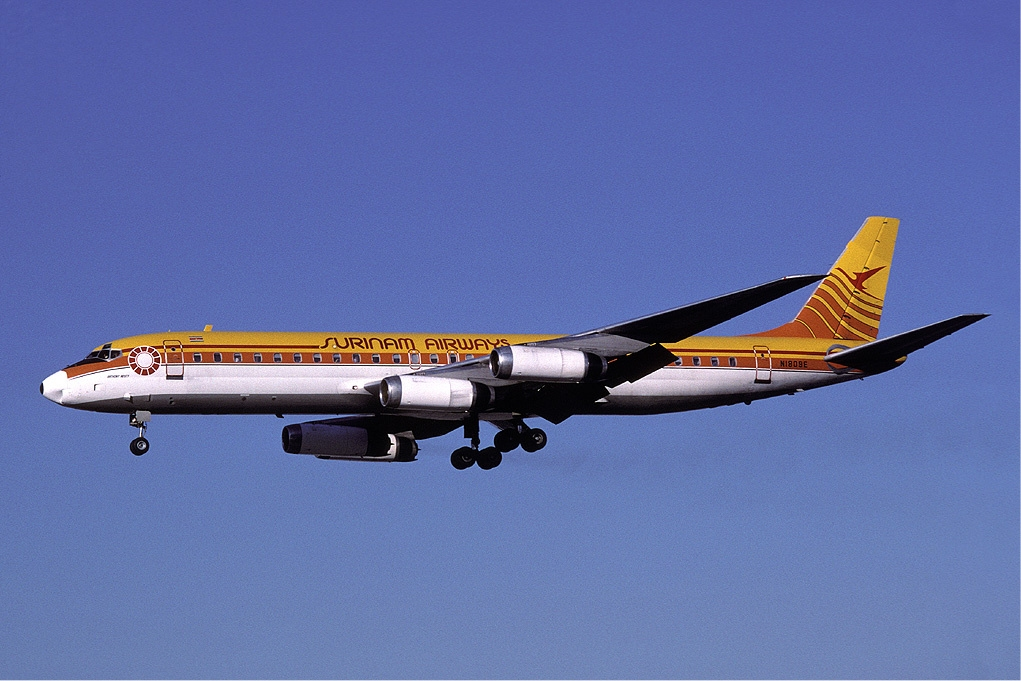
The Surinam Airways accident aircraft, photographed in February 1989

- Surinam Airways Flight 764, originating from Amsterdam Airport Schiphol, crashed in Paramaribo, Suriname, due to pilot error, killing 176. Among the dead were 14 members of an exhibition football team known as the "Colourful XI" (Kleurijk Elftal) (one of whom died in hospital three days later) and their coach; three players survived.
- Died in the crash of Surinam Airways Flight 764:
  - Ruud Degenaar, 25, Heracles Almelo
  - Lloyd Doesburg, 29, AFC Ajax
  - Steve van Dorpel, 23, FC Volendam
  - Wendel Fräser, 22, RBC Roosendaal
  - Frits Goodings, 25, FC Wageningen
  - Jerry Haatrecht, 28, Neerlandia
  - Virgall Joemankhan, 20, Cercle Brugge K.S.V.
  - Andro Knel, 21, NAC Breda
  - Ruben Kogeldans, 22, Willem II Tilburg
  - Fred Patrick, 23, PEC Zwolle
  - Andy Scharmin, 21, FC Twente
  - Elfried Veldman, 23, De Graafschap
  - Florian Vijent, 27, SC Telstar
  - Nick Stienstra, 34, RCH (coach)
- The United States Navy submarine USS Blenny, launched in 1944, was sunk as part of an artificial reef off Ocean City, Maryland. Former crewmembers of the Blenny were present for the sinking ceremony.
- Born:
  - James Hamilton, New Zealand Olympic snowboarder; in Takapuna, New Zealand
  - Seiji Kobayashi, Japanese professional baseball catcher
  - Agyemang Opoku (born Nana Opoku Agyemang-Prempeh), Ghanaian footballer; in Obuasi, Ashanti Region, Ghana
  - Mitch Robinson, Australian rules footballer
  - Sofía Sisniega, Mexican actress; in Cuernavaca, Morelos, Mexico
- Died:
  - Chico Landi (born Francisco Sacco Landi), 81, Brazilian Formula One driver
  - Nara Leão, 47, Brazilian bossa nova singer, died of a brain tumor.

== June 8, 1989 (Thursday) ==
- Pope John Paul II arrived in Sweden, visiting Stockholm, Uppsala and Vadstena Castle before leaving for Rome on June 10.
- A team led by Dr. Robert Ballard located the wreck of the German battleship Bismarck, which was sunk in 1941, about 600 miles (970 km) west of Brest, France at a depth of 15,000 feet (4,600 m).
- Trump Shuttle began service between Washington, D.C., New York City and Boston. Businessman Donald Trump had acquired the operations of Eastern Air Lines Shuttle the previous day. USAir would acquire the shuttle service in 1992 and rename it USAir Shuttle.
- U.S. President George H. W. Bush held the first prime time news conference of his presidency. When asked whether he had contacted any of China's leaders by telephone about the recent events there, Bush replied, "Line was busy. Couldn't get through."
- Born:
  - Timea Bacsinszky, Swiss tennis player; in Lausanne, Switzerland
  - Richard Fleeshman, English actor and singer-songwriter; in Manchester, England
  - Simon Trummer, Swiss racing driver; in Frutigen, Canton of Bern, Switzerland
  - Amaury Vassili, French operatic tenor; in Rouen, Upper Normandy, France
- Died: Susan Daniels Smith, 27–28, American FBI informant, was murdered by her handler and lover, Agent Mark Putnam.

== June 9, 1989 (Friday) ==
- Born:
  - Chloë Agnew, Irish singer; in Knocklyon, County Dublin, Ireland
  - Danilo Avelar, Brazilian footballer; in Paranavaí, Brazil
  - Logan Browning, American actress; in Atlanta, Georgia
  - Baden Kerr, New Zealand rugby union player; in Papakura, Auckland, New Zealand
  - Josie Tomic, Australian Olympic track cyclist; in Subiaco, Western Australia
  - Dídac Vilà, Spanish footballer; in Mataró, Spain
- Died:
  - George Beadle, 85, American geneticist, recipient of the Nobel Prize in Physiology or Medicine, died of Alzheimer's disease.
  - Rashid Behbudov, 73, Azerbaijani singer and actor, died of kidney disease.
  - Vladimir Kasatonov, 78, Soviet admiral of the fleet, Hero of the Soviet Union
  - José López Rega OIC, 72, Argentine politician, died of diabetes and a heart attack.
  - Wolfdietrich Schnurre, 68, German writer, died of heart failure.

== June 10, 1989 (Saturday) ==
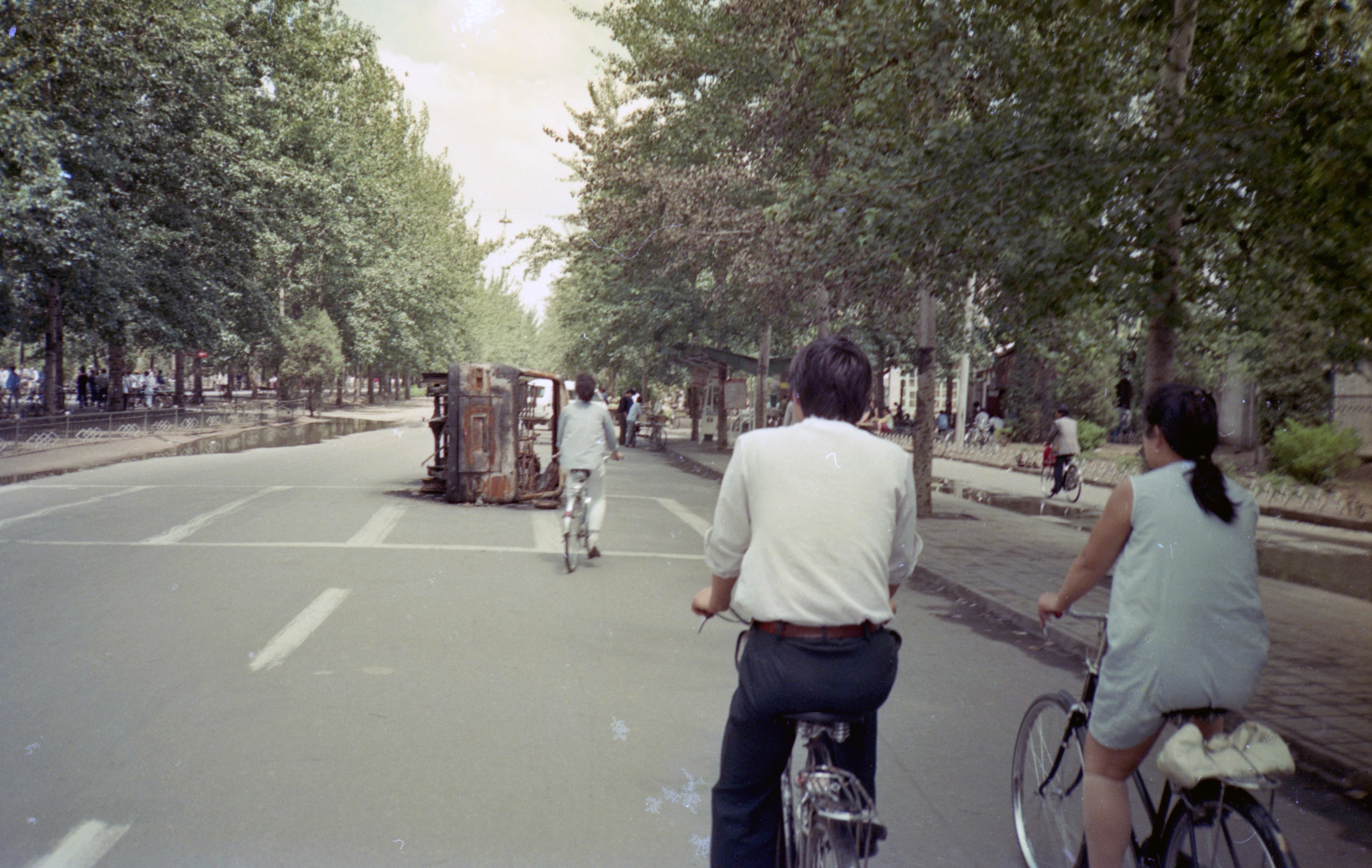
Burned car on street in Beijing after Tiananmen Square protests

- A groundbreaking ceremony was held for a new, modern facility for Woodbridge Hospital (later known as the Institute of Mental Health) in Singapore.
- United States Air Force Captain Jacquelyn S. Parker graduated from the U.S. Air Force Test Pilot School at Edwards Air Force Base, the first female pilot to do so.
- Born:
  - DeAndre Kane, American-born Hungarian professional basketball player; in Pittsburgh, Pennsylvania
  - David Miller, South African cricketer; in Pietermaritzburg, Natal, South Africa
  - Alexandra Stan, Romanian singer-songwriter; in Constanța, Romania
  - William Whetton, New Zealand rugby union player
- Died:
  - Ortwin Linger, 21, Dutch footballer (HFC Haarlem), died three days after the crash of Surinam Airways Flight 764 as a result of his injuries.
  - Richard Quine, 68, American actor and director, committed suicide by gunshot.

== June 11, 1989 (Sunday) ==
- American racer Kevin Schwantz of the Suzuki Pepsi Cola team won the 1989 Yugoslavian motorcycle Grand Prix at the Automotodrom Grobnik circuit near Rijeka, Yugoslavia.
- 27-year-old New Zealand mountaineer David Heymann fell 1,000 metres (3,300 ft) to his death from the Hörnli Ridge on the Matterhorn. His climbing partner, Greg Houston, descended the mountain alone without the pair's ropes, which Heymann had been carrying.
- American driver Ricky Rudd won the 1989 Banquet Frozen Foods 300 stock car race at Sears Point International Raceway in Sonoma, California.
- A Beechcraft sightseeing plane carrying 10 tourists and the pilot disappeared between the islands of Hawaii and Maui.
- Born:
  - Lorenzo Ariaudo, Italian footballer; in Turin, Italy
  - Keith Aulie, Canadian National Hockey League defenceman; in Rouleau, Saskatchewan, Canada
  - Ana Clara Duarte, Brazilian tennis player; in Rio de Janeiro, Brazil
  - Maya Moore, American professional and Olympic champion basketball player; in Jefferson City, Missouri
- Died:
  - Conrad Baden, Norwegian composer and organist (b. 1908)

== June 12, 1989 (Monday) ==
- A powerful time bomb killed at least seven people and injured or maimed 54 others at the main railroad station in New Delhi, India.
- The Corcoran Gallery of Art in Washington, D.C., canceled Robert Mapplethorpe's photography exhibition, "Robert Mapplethorpe: The Perfect Moment", due to its sexually explicit content. Mapplethorpe had died of AIDS in March 1989.
- Glen Sather stepped down as head coach of the National Hockey League's Edmonton Oilers and was succeeded by John Muckler.
- Testifying before the Dubin inquiry, Canadian Olympic sprinter Ben Johnson admitted under oath that he used steroids beginning in 1981, leading to his disqualification at the 1988 Summer Olympics.
- At Caesars Palace in Paradise, Nevada, American boxers Sugar Ray Leonard and Thomas Hearns fought in a rematch of their September 1981 bout. The fight ended in a draw after 12 rounds. On the undercard, Andrew Maynard defeated Steve Schwan, Ray Mercer knocked out Ken Crosby, Kennedy McKinney won by decision over David Moreno, Michael Carbajal defeated Eduardo Nunez, and Robert Wangila won by decision over Buck Smith.
- Born:
  - Emma Eliasson, Swedish professional and Olympic ice hockey defender; in Karesuando, Kiruna, Sweden
  - Andrea Guardini, Italian cyclist; in Tregnago, Italy
  - Ibrahim Jeilan, Ethiopian long-distance runner; in Bale Province, Ethiopia
  - Shane Lowry, Australian footballer; in Perth, Western Australia
  - Tim Nanai-Williams, New Zealand-born Samoan rugby union player; in Auckland, New Zealand
  - Dale Stephens, English footballer; in Bolton, England
- Died:
  - Bruce Hamilton CBE, 77, Australian public servant
  - Cath Vautier OBE, 86, New Zealand netball player, teacher and sports administrator

== June 13, 1989 (Tuesday) ==
- Six miners drowned at the Emu Mine near Leinster, Western Australia, in an accident caused by heavy rains.
- The Hungarian Round Table Talks, which would help lead to the end of socialism in Hungary, formally began.
- During a four-day visit by Mikhail Gorbachev, the General Secretary of the Communist Party of the Soviet Union, to West Germany, Gorbachev and West German Chancellor Helmut Kohl signed a joint declaration in Bonn which promised respect for human rights and expressed support for disarmament measures. One passage constituted Gorbachev's renunciation of the Brezhnev Doctrine.
- The sixteenth James Bond film, Licence to Kill, premiered at the Odeon Cinema in London, England. The first Bond film not to use or paraphrase the title of an Ian Fleming story, it was also the second and final film to star Timothy Dalton as the fictional spy. Charles, Prince of Wales, and Diana, Princess of Wales, attended the premiere.
- Aboard Air Force One, U.S. President Bush vetoed a bill passed by the U.S. Congress that would have increased the minimum wage to $4.55 an hour over three years.
- The Detroit Pistons won the 1989 NBA Finals, defeating the Los Angeles Lakers 4 games to 0.
- Born:
  - Coline Aumard, French professional squash player; in Villeneuve-Saint-Georges, Paris, France
  - Ben Barba, Australian rugby league footballer; in Darwin, Northern Territory, Australia
  - James Calado, English racing driver; in Cropthorne, Worcestershire, England
  - Ryan McDonagh, American National Hockey League defenceman; in Saint Paul, Minnesota
  - Daniel Mortimer, Australian rugby league footballer; in Sydney, New South Wales, Australia
  - Andreas Samaris, Greek footballer; in Patras, Greece
  - Andreas Sander, German Olympic alpine skier; in Schwelm, North Rhine-Westphalia, West Germany
  - Tommy Searle, English motocross racer; in Pembury, Kent, England
  - Lisa Tucker, American singer and actress; in Anaheim, California
  - Hassan Whiteside, National Basketball Association player; in Gastonia, North Carolina
  - Erica Wiebe, Canadian Olympic champion wrestler; in Stittsville, Ontario, Canada
  - Dino Wieser, Swiss professional ice hockey forward
- Died:
  - Fran Allison, 81, American actress and television personality, died of bone marrow failure.
  - Scott Ross, 38, American-born harpsichordist, died of pneumonia related to AIDS.

== June 14, 1989 (Wednesday) ==
- During his first visit to London since leaving office in January, former U.S. President Ronald Reagan had lunch at Buckingham Palace with Queen Elizabeth II, who made him an honorary knight Grand Cross of the Order of the Bath.
- The Secretary of State (United Kingdom) announced that, in cases where people incorrectly refused entry into the UK as children because they were "not related as claimed" could now prove their relationship to their relatives in the UK through DNA fingerprinting, in order to immigrate to the UK they would have to prove that they were still dependent on their UK sponsors and, if they were over 18, that there were compassionate circumstances other than the fact of wrongful separation.

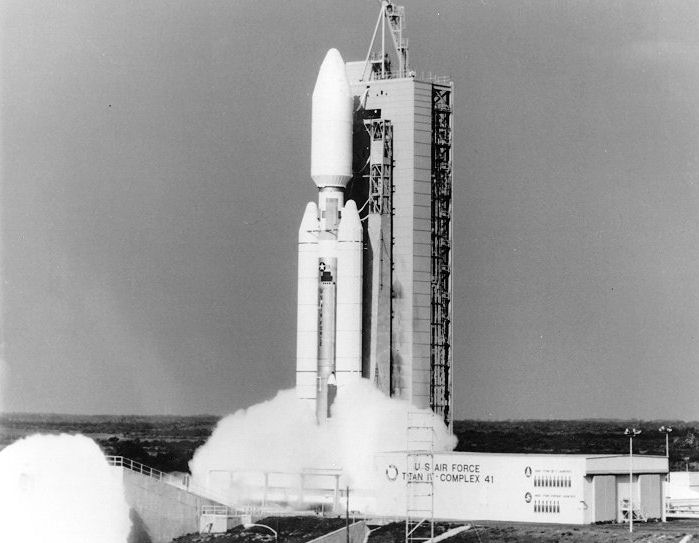
Launch of the first Titan IV rocket

- The first Titan IV rocket was launched from Cape Canaveral Air Force Station in Florida, carrying a classified military payload.
- Born:
  - Lucy Hale (born Karen Lucille Hale), American actress and singer; in Memphis, Tennessee
  - Cory Higgins, National Basketball Association player; in Danville, California
  - Mónica Olivia Rodríguez, Mexican Paralympic middle-distance runner; in Ciudad Guzmán, Zapotlán el Grande, Mexico
  - Brad Takairangi, Australian-New Zealand rugby league footballer; in Sydney, New South Wales, Australia
- Died:
  - Louis-Philippe-Antoine Bélanger, 82, Canadian politician
  - Pete de Freitas, 27, English musician and producer (Echo & the Bunnymen), died in a motorcycle accident.
  - Joseph Malula, 71, Congolese Catholic archbishop and cardinal

== June 15, 1989 (Thursday) ==
- The 1989 European Parliament election began in the twelve member states of the European Community.
- At the 1989 Irish general election, Fianna Fáil, led by Taoiseach Charles Haughey, failed to win a majority.
- 21-year-old soldier Adam Gilbert of the Royal Marines was killed by friendly fire when his patrol fired at a stolen car in Belfast.
- Sub Pop released Bleach, the debut studio album by the American rock band Nirvana.
- Born:
  - Bayley (born Pamela Rose Martinez), American professional wrestler; in San Jose, California
  - Victor Cabedo, Spanish cyclist; in Onda, Castellón, Spain (d. 2012 in training crash)
  - Bryan Clauson, American auto racing driver; in Carmichael, California (d. 2016 in race crash)
  - Lewis Hancox, English graphic novelist, social media personality and filmmaker
  - Alex Puccio (born Alexandrea Elizabeth Cocca), American professional climber; in McKinney, Texas
- Died:
  - Maurice Bellemare, OC, 77, Canadian lawyer and politician, died of diabetes.
  - Victor French, 54, American actor and director, died of lung cancer.
  - Judy Johnson (born William Julius Johnson), 89, American Negro league baseball third baseman and manager
  - Ray McAnally, 63, Irish actor, died of a heart attack.

== June 16, 1989 (Friday) ==
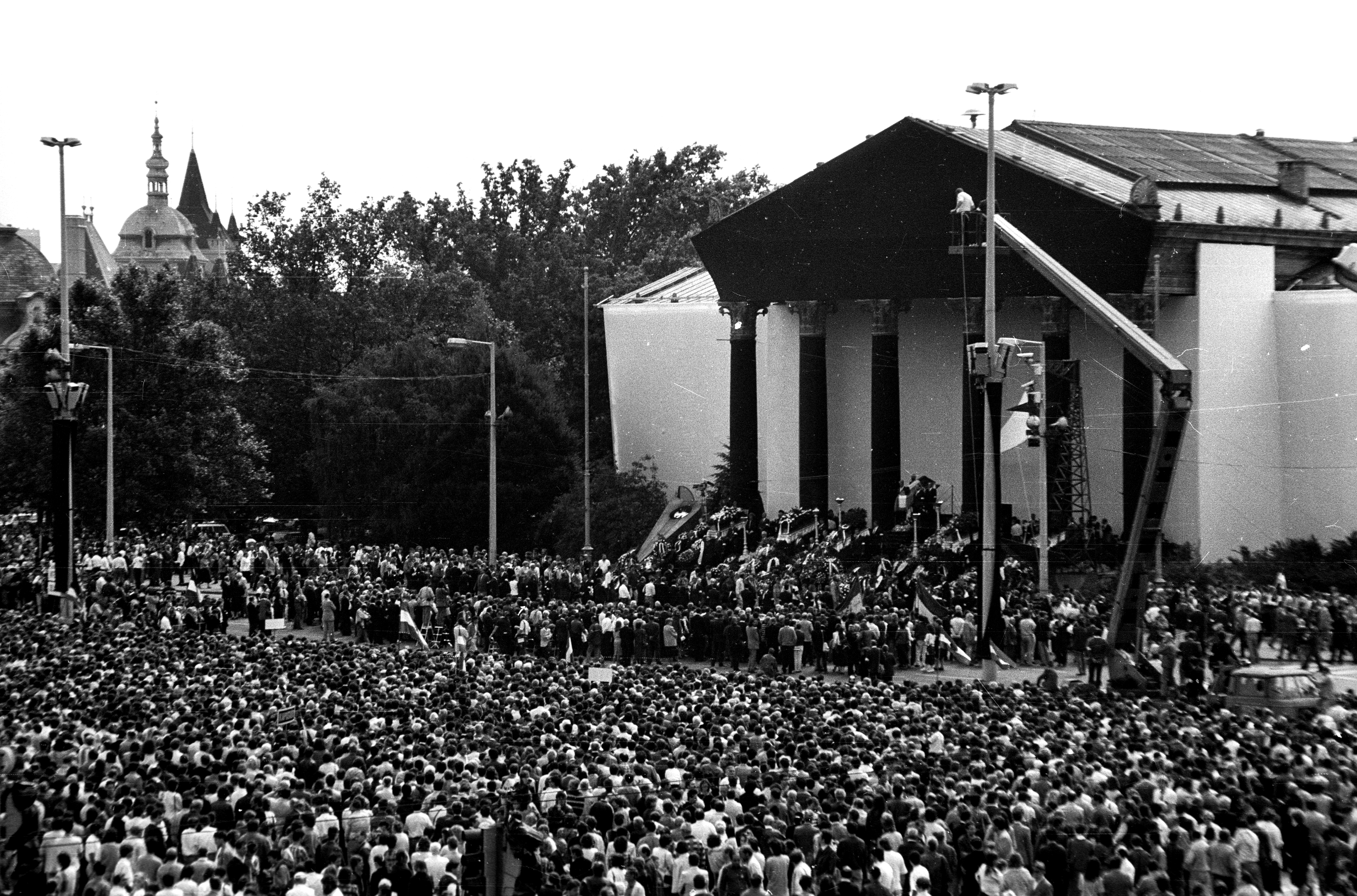
Reburial of Imre Nagy

- A crowd of at least 100,000 gathered at Heroes Square in Budapest for the reburial of Imre Nagy, the former Hungarian Prime Minister who had been executed in 1958.
- At about 7 a.m., three bank robbers, one of them disguised as a security guard, took four employees and police officer Daniel C. O'Connell hostage at the City National Bank of Florida in Hallandale, Florida. Police Lt. David H. Miles arrived on scene and a shootout ensued. Miles was shot in the upper abdomen and neck but survived due to his bulletproof vest and arrested one robber; O'Connell shot a second robber to death. The third man escaped but would be arrested on January 23, 1990. Miles and O'Connell would be named Officers of the Year by the Broward 10-13 Club in New York City in January 1991.
- Police evacuated about 7,500 people from the east side of Akron, Ohio, due to the discovery of cases of unstable dynamite during building demolition. Members of the Summit County, Ohio hazardous materials squad and the sheriff's bomb squad burned the dynamite safely.
- Born:
  - Odion Ighalo, Nigerian footballer; in Lagos, Nigeria
  - Sergio Camalich Morales, Mexican artist; in Hermosillo, Sonora
- Died:
  - Arthur Häggblad, 80, Swedish Olympic cross-country skier
  - Jerzy Pniewski, 76, Polish physicist

== June 17, 1989 (Saturday) ==
- Interflug Flight 102 crashed on takeoff from Berlin Schönefeld Airport in East Germany, killing 21 of the 113 people on board.
- At least six people died in the crash of an Army National Guard helicopter in Yarmouth Port, Yarmouth, Massachusetts.
- Born:
  - Simone Battle, American singer, dancer and actress (G.R.L.); in Los Angeles, California (d. 2014, suicide by hanging)
  - Georgios Tofas, Cypriot footballer; in Larnaca, Cyprus
- Died:
  - S. David Griggs, 49, American naval aviator and NASA astronaut, died in the crash of a vintage World War II airplane he was piloting.
  - John Matuszak, 38, American football defensive end and actor, died of acute propoxyphene intoxication.

== June 18, 1989 (Sunday) ==
- The second round of the 1989 Polish legislative election was held.
- In the first Greek legislative election of the year, the Panhellenic Socialist Movement, led by Prime Minister of Greece Andreas Papandreou, lost control of the Hellenic Parliament.
- Belgian driver Thierry Boutsen of the Williams-Renault team won the 1989 Canadian Grand Prix at Circuit Gilles Villeneuve in Montreal, Quebec, Canada.
- American driver Terry Labonte won the 1989 Miller High Life 500 stock car race at Pocono International Raceway in Long Pond, Pennsylvania.
- Born:
  - Jonas Acquistapace, German footballer; in North Rhine-Westphalia, West Germany
  - Pierre-Emerick Aubameyang, French-born Gabonese professional and Olympic footballer; in Laval, Mayenne, France
  - Chris Harris Jr., National Football League cornerback; in Tulsa, Oklahoma
  - Anna Veith (born Anna Fenninger), Austrian Olympic champion alpine ski racer; in Hallein, Salzburg, Austria
  - Renee Olstead (born Rebecca Renee Olstead), American actress and singer; in Houston, Texas
- Died:
  - John Rainey Adkins, 47, American guitarist and songwriter, died of a heart attack.
  - I. F. Stone, 81, American investigative journalist and author

== June 19, 1989 (Monday) ==
- Burma officially changed its name in English to the Union of Myanmar, also changing the name of its people's nationality from "Burmese" to "Myanmar". "Rangoon", the name of Myanmar's capital, was to be spelled "Yangon" in English.
- At 1:10 a.m., a bomb exploded at the barracks of the British Army's Osnabrück Garrison in Osnabrück, West Germany, blowing a hole about 8 feet (2.4 m) in diameter from the ground floor to the roof of the building. No one was injured in the blast. A 62-year-old West German boilerman surprised two suspects before they could set four more bombs to detonate; they fled after hitting the boilerman in the face, leaving him with bruises and scratches. West German authorities believed the Provisional Irish Republican Army was responsible for the bombing.
- Spain joined the European Monetary System.
- Born: Giacomo Gianniotti, Italian-Canadian actor; in Rome, Italy
- Died:
  - Dieter Aderhold, 49, German political scientist, university teacher and politician
  - Betti Alver, 82, Estonian poet
  - Andrey Prokofyev, 30, Soviet Olympic champion track and field athlete, committed suicide by hanging.

== June 20, 1989 (Tuesday) ==
- Born:
  - Christopher Mintz-Plasse, American actor and comedian; in Woodland Hills, California
  - Javier Pastore, Argentine footballer; in Córdoba, Argentina
  - Terrelle Pryor, National Football League quarterback and wide receiver; in Jeannette, Pennsylvania
  - Matthew Raymond-Barker, English singer; in London, England
- Died: Otto Kässbohrer, 85, German entrepreneur and design engineer

== June 21, 1989 (Wednesday) ==
- The Supreme Court of the United States ruled in Texas v. Johnson that American flag-burning was a form of political protest protected by the First Amendment to the United States Constitution.
- Born:
  - Albert Anae, New Zealand rugby union player; in Wellington, New Zealand
  - Raheleh Asemani, Iranian-born Belgian Olympic taekwondo practitioner; in Karaj, Iran
  - Jarno Gmelich, Dutch cyclist; in Almere, Netherlands
  - Abubaker Kaki Khamis, Sudanese Olympic runner; in Muglad, Sudan
  - Christopher Lamb, American ski jumper
- Died:
  - Lee Calhoun, 56, American Olympic champion track and field athlete
  - Henri Sauguet, 88, French composer

== June 22, 1989 (Thursday) ==
- In Gbadolite, Zaire, 18 African heads of state witnessed the declaration of Gbadolite, proclaiming a ceasefire in the Angolan Civil War to take effect on June 24.
- British police arrested 260 people celebrating the summer solstice at Stonehenge.
- The University of Limerick and Dublin City University were raised to the status of universities, the first established in Ireland since independence in 1922.
- Born:
  - Daniel Aase, Norwegian footballer; in Kristiansand, Norway
  - Jeffrey Earnhardt, American race car driver; in Mooresville, North Carolina
  - Christian Eyenga (born Christian Eyenga Moenge), Congolese National Basketball Association player; in Kinshasa, Zaire
  - Jung Yong-hwa, South Korean musician, singer-songwriter, record producer and actor; in Yeoksam-dong, Gangnam District, Seoul, South Korea
  - Andreas Mikkelsen, Norwegian alpine skier and rally driver; in Oslo, Norway
  - Cédric Mongongu, Congolese footballer; in Kinshasa, Zaire
- Died: Glenn Michael Souther (a.k.a. Mikhail Yevgenyevich Orlov), 32, American-Soviet sailor and defector, committed suicide by carbon monoxide poisoning.

== June 23, 1989 (Friday) ==
- The Greek-registered oil tanker World Prodigy struck a reef at the mouth of Narraganset Bay off Newport, Rhode Island, spilling 297,000 US gallons (1,120,000 L; 247,000 imp gal) of home heating oil into the ocean. Beaches and shellfish beds in Rhode Island were forced to close, but the environmental damage was relatively light.
- The film Batman opened on general release, earning more than $40 million in its first weekend, a box office record.
- Born:
  - Lauren Bennett, English model, dancer and singer (G.R.L.); in Meopham, Kent, England
  - Lisa Carrington, New Zealand Olympic champion flatwater canoeist; in Tauranga, New Zealand
  - Marielle Jaffe, American actress, singer and model; in Valencia, Santa Clarita, California
  - Jordan Nolan, Canadian National Hockey League forward; in Garden River First Nation, Ontario, Canada
  - Ayana Taketatsu, Japanese voice actress; in Saitama Prefecture, Japan
- Died:
  - Michel Aflaq, 79, Syrian philosopher, sociologist and Arab nationalist
  - Werner Best, 85, German Nazi official, jurist, police chief and SS-Obergruppenführer leader
  - Timothy Manning, 79, Irish-American Catholic archbishop and cardinal, died of cancer.

== June 24, 1989 (Saturday) ==
- In the aftermath of the Tiananmen Square protests, Jiang Zemin became General Secretary of the Chinese Communist Party, succeeding Zhao Ziyang.
- 36-year-old Catholic civilian Liam McKee was shot and killed by the Ulster Freedom Fighters at his home in Lisburn, County Antrim.
- Born:
  - Juan José Barros, Peruvian footballer; in Barranquilla, Colombia
  - Fabian Böhm, German handball player; in Potsdam, East Germany
  - Ilektra-Elli Efthymiou, Greek Olympic rhythmic gymnast
  - Teklemariam Medhin, Eritrean Olympic long-distance runner; in Hazega, Ethiopia
- Died:
  - Hibari Misora (born Kazue Katō), 52, Japanese singer, died of heart failure.
  - Prince Vasili Alexandrovich of Russia, 81

== June 25, 1989 (Sunday) ==
- Mexican boxer Humberto González defeated South Korean boxer Lee Yul-woo in a bout in Jeonju, South Korea, to claim the WBC Light Flyweight Championship.
- American driver Bill Elliott won the 1989 Miller High Life 400 (Michigan) stock car race at Michigan International Speedway in Brooklyn, Michigan.
- A group of 16- and 17-year-old volunteer firefighters at the District Heights Fire Station in Prince George's County, Maryland, were discussing their frustration with their fire chief's criticisms of their performance when one of them suggested setting a fire to help prove themselves. The conversation led to some of the first in a series of arsons that would continue until July 1990 and also involve young volunteer firefighters from Boulevard Heights, acting independently of the District Heights group.
- Born: Chris Brochu, American actor and singer-songwriter; in Washington, D.C.
- Died: Idris Cox, 89, Welsh communist activist and newspaper editor

== June 26, 1989 (Monday) ==
- The Supreme Court of the United States ruled in Penry v. Lynaugh that the execution of persons with intellectual disabilities did not violate the ban on cruel and unusual punishment in the Eighth Amendment to the United States Constitution.
- Born:
  - Carlos Lopez, American stunt performer; in North Carolina (d. 2014, accidental fall)
  - Magid Magid, Somali-British activist and politician; in Burao, Somali Democratic Republic
- Died:
  - Howard Charles Green, PC, 93, Canadian politician and parliamentarian
  - Earle Riddiford, 67, New Zealand mountaineer

== June 27, 1989 (Tuesday) ==
- The International Labour Organization adopted the Indigenous and Tribal Peoples Convention, 1989, the major binding international convention concerning indigenous peoples and tribal peoples.
- 34-year-old Protestant David Black of the Royal Ulster Constabulary was killed while off-duty by a bomb attached to his car by the Irish Republican Army at his home in Artigarvan, County Tyrone.
- Born:
  - Hana Birnerová, Czech tennis player
  - Sabino Brunello, Italian chess Grandmaster; in Brescia, Italy
  - Kimiko Glenn, American actress and singer; in Phoenix, Arizona
  - Matthew Lewis, British actor; in Leeds, England
  - Frank Stäbler, German Olympic Greco-Roman wrestler; in Böblingen, Baden-Württemberg, West Germany
  - Bruna Tenório, Brazilian supermodel; in Maceió, Alagoas, Brazil
- Died:
  - Sir A. J. Ayer FBA, 78, British philosopher
  - Jack Buetel, 73, American actor
  - Michele Lupo, 56, Italian film director

== June 28, 1989 (Wednesday) ==
- On the 600th anniversary of the Battle of Kosovo, Serbian President Slobodan Milošević delivered the Gazimestan speech at the site of the historic battle.
- Born:
  - Ronny Fredrik Ansnes, Norwegian cross-country skier; in Meldal, Norway (d. 2018, drowned)
  - Sergio Asenjo, Spanish footballer; in Palencia, Spain
  - Jason Clark, Australian rugby league footballer; in Sydney, New South Wales, Australia
  - Andrew Fifita, Tongan rugby league footballer; in Blacktown, New South Wales, Australia
  - David Fifita, Tongan rugby league footballer; in Blacktown, New South Wales, Australia
  - Joe Kovacs, American Olympic shot putter; in Bethlehem, Pennsylvania
  - Nicole Rottmann, Austrian tennis player; in Wagna, Austria
  - Julia Zlobina, Azerbaijani Olympic ice dancer; in Kirov, Kirov Oblast, Russian SFSR, Soviet Union
- Died:
  - Joris Ivens, 90, Dutch filmmaker
  - Alfredo Sadel (born Manuel Alfredo Sánchez Luna), 59, Venezuelan singer and actor, died of a heart attack.

== June 29, 1989 (Thursday) ==
- Born:
  - Maciej Szymon Cieśla, Polish graphics designer; in Katowice, Poland (d. 2016, bone cancer)
  - Isabelle Gulldén, Swedish Olympic and professional handball player; in Sävedalen, Partille Municipality, Sweden
  - Maciej Sadlok, Polish footballer; in Oświęcim, Poland
  - Jens Westin, Swedish professional ice hockey defenceman; in Kalix, Sweden

== June 30, 1989 (Friday) ==
- A military coup led by Omar al-Bashir ousted the civilian government of Prime Minister of Sudan Sadiq al-Mahdi.
- Retired United States Navy Admiral James B. Busey IV took office as the 11th Administrator of the Federal Aviation Administration.
- At 10:29 a.m., an electrical fire broke out on the sixth floor of the South Tower of Peachtree 25th, a 10-story office building in Atlanta, Georgia. The fire killed five people and injured 29.
- In Washington, D.C., over 900 artists and supporters of the late Robert Mapplethorpe took part in a protest of the cancellation of his exhibition at the Corcoran Gallery of Art, during which enlargements of Mapplethorpe's photos were projected onto the façade of the gallery.
- Born:
  - Asbel Kiprop, Kenyan Olympic champion middle-distance runner; in Eldoret, Kenya
  - Ginta Lapiņa, Latvian model; in Riga, Latvian Soviet Socialist Republic, Soviet Union
  - Steffen Liebig, German rugby union player
  - Damián Lizio, Argentine-born Bolivian footballer; in Florida, Buenos Aires, Argentina
  - David Myers, Australian rules footballer
- Died: Hilmar Baunsgaard, 69, Danish politician and 34th Prime Minister of Denmark
