= Laos at the Paralympics =

- IPC code: LAO
- NPC: Lao Paralympic Committee
- Medals: Gold 0 Silver 0 Bronze 1 Total 1

Summer appearances
- 2000; 2004; 2008; 2012; 2016; 2020; 2024

Laos made its Paralympic Games début at the 2000 Summer Paralympics in Sydney, sending just two representatives to compete in powerlifting. They ranked poorly, and the country did not participate in the next edition of the Games in 2004. Laos made its return to the Paralympics in 2008, with powerlifter Eay Simay as its sole competitor. Simay -greatly improving on his performance from 2000- won the country's first Paralympic medal, a bronze, by lifting 157.5 kg in the men's up to 48 kg category.

Laos has never taken part in the Winter Paralympics.

== Full results for Laos at the Paralympics ==
Name	Games	Sport	Event	Score	Rank
Eay Simay	2000 Sydney	Powerlifting	Men's Up To 48 kg	110 kg	12th (out of 16)
Dalouni Xaythanith	2000 Sydney	Powerlifting	Women's Up To 44 kg	40 kg	8th (out of 9)
Eay Simay	2008 Beijing	Powerlifting	Men's Up To 48 kg	157.5 kg	Bronze
Eay Simay	2012 London	Powerlifting	Men's Up To 48 kg	155 kg	4th
Pia Pia	2016 Rio	Powerlifting	Men's Up To 49 kg	121 kg	6th
Ken Thepthida	2020 Tokyo	Athletics	100 metres T13	NM	
Ken Thepthida	2024 Paris	Athletics	Men's long jump T13	NM	

== See also ==
- Laos at the Olympics
