= Laos at the 2012 Summer Olympics =

- Flag of Laos
- IOC code: LAO
- NOC: National Olympic Committee of Laos

in London
- Competitors: 3 in 2 sports
- Flag bearer: Kilakone Siphonexay
- Medals: Gold 0 Silver 0 Bronze 0 Total 0

Summer Olympics appearances (overview)
- 1980; 1984; 1988; 1992; 1996; 2000; 2004; 2008; 2012; 2016; 2020; 2024; 2028

Laos competed at the 2012 Summer Olympics in London when the event took place from 27 July to 12 August 2012. It was the nation's eighth overall appearance following their Olympic debut in 1980. Laos had previously competed in seven consecutive Olympics prior to London apart from the 1984 Summer Olympics boycott. Two athletes and one swimmer were selected to the Laotian Olympic team after the country did not qualify any competitors.

Sprinter Kilakone Siphonexay was the nation's flag bearer at the opening and closing ceremonies. At the Olympics, Siphonexay and runner Laenly Phoutthavong failed to advance in the 100 m heats while swimmer Phathana Inthavong did not reach farther than the 50 m freestyle heats. Overall, Inthavong had the highest ranking for Laos in 2012 with a 56th place finish.

== Background ==
Following the 1978 formation of the National Olympic Committee of Laos, the NOC became part of the International Olympic Committee in 1979. Laos appeared at their first Olympic Games at the 1980 Summer Olympics. In May 1984, Laos withdrew their participation from the 1984 Summer Olympics. After not appearing in 1984, Laos competed in six consecutive Summer Olympics leading up to the 2012 Summer Olympics, which took place from 27 July to 12 August in London.

While training at Chao Anouvong Stadium, the Laotian runners used concrete barbell weights made from paint cans and tires. These weights were joined together with beams from scaffolding. For the 2012 Olympics, Kilakone Siphonexay and Laenly Phoutthavong represented the country in athletics while Phathana Inthavong competed in swimming. With an average age of eighteen, Laos had the youngest team at the 2012 Olympics. Competing in his first Olympics, Siphonexay was the flag bearer for Laos at the opening and closing ceremonies. Phoutthavong and Inthavong also went to their first Olympics in 2012.

== Athletics ==
Prior to the 2012 Summer Olympics, none of the Laotian competitors qualified for the athletic events. Kilakone Siphonexay entered the Olympics with a personal best of 11.24 seconds. With his time, Siphonexay was exactly one second slower than the B standard qualifying time for the men's 100 m. On 4 August, Siphonexay finished sixth in the first preliminary heat with a time of 11.30 seconds. With his sixth place heat finish, Siphonexay was not one of the eight qualifiers that finished in the top two of the four heats. For the last two qualifying spots, Siphonexay did not reach the next round as he was not one of the two remaining athletes to have one of the top two fastest times. Overall, Siphonexay was 68th out of 75 competitors.

For the women's 100 m, Laenly Phoutthavong went to the 2012 Olympics without a qualifying time or personal best. On 3 August, Phoutthavong completed the third preliminary heat in sixth place and a time of 13.15 seconds. Phoutthavong did not qualify to the next round with her heat placing as she did not finish in the top two in her individual heat. As Phoutthavong did not have one of the two quickest overall times as part of the remaining athletes, she did not advance from the preliminary round. Out of 79 competitors, Phoutthavong was 68th overall during the Olympic event.

Key

- Note–Individual ranks are heat finishes.

Men

Athlete	Event	Heat		Quarterfinal		Semifinal		Final	
Athlete	Event	Result	Rank	Result	Rank	Result	Rank	Result	Rank
Kilakone Siphonexay	100 m	11.30	6	Did not advance					

Women

Athlete	Event	Heat		Quarterfinal		Semifinal		Final	
Athlete	Event	Result	Rank	Result	Rank	Result	Rank	Result	Rank
Laenly Phoutthavong	100 m	13.15	6	Did not advance					

== Swimming ==
For the swimming events, Laos had no competitors qualify for the Olympics. For the men's 50m freestyle, Pathana Inthavong received a universality spot. His entry time of 28.94 seconds was 6.06 seconds slower than the invitational time for the Olympics. Prior to the Games, Inthavong had swum at the 2011 World Aquatics Championships as a requirement to compete as a non-qualified Olympic athlete. On 2 August, Inthavong was second with a time of 28.17 seconds during the first heat of the 50 m freestyle event. As Inthavong did not have one of the top 16 times during the heats, he did not qualify for the semifinals. Overall, Inthavong finished 56th out of 58 competitors.

Key

- Note–Individual rank is heat finish.

Men

Athlete	Event	Heat		Semifinal		Final	
Athlete	Event	Time	Rank	Time	Rank	Time	Rank
Phathana Inthavong	50 m freestyle	28.17	2	Did not advance			

== See also ==
- Laos at the 2012 Summer Paralympics
