= Laos at the 2008 Summer Paralympics =

- IPC code: LAO
- NPC: Lao Paralympic Committee

in Beijing
- Competitors: 1 in 1 sport
- Flag bearer: Eay Simay
- Medals Ranked 69th: Gold 0 Silver 0 Bronze 1 Total 1

Summer Paralympics appearances (overview)
- 2000; 2004; 2008; 2012; 2016; 2020; 2024

Laos competed at the 2008 Summer Paralympics in Beijing, China.

== Medalists ==
Medal	Name	Sport	Event
Bronze	Eay Simay	Powerlifting	Men's 48 kg

== Sports ==
=== Powerlifting ===
Athlete	Event	Result	Rank
Eay Simay	48kg	157.5	3rd place, bronze medalist(s)

== See also ==
- Laos at the Paralympics
- Laos at the 2008 Summer Olympics
