= Laos at the 2020 Summer Paralympics =

Sporting event delegation

- IPC code: LAO
- NPC: Lao Paralympic Committee

in Tokyo
- Competitors: 1 in 1 sport
- Medals: Gold 0 Silver 0 Bronze 0 Total 0

Summer Paralympics appearances (overview)
- 2000; 2004; 2008; 2012; 2016; 2020; 2024

Laos competed at the 2020 Summer Paralympics in Tokyo, Japan, from 24 August to 5 September 2021.

== Athletics ==
Athlete	Event	Heats		Final	
Athlete	Event	Result	Rank	Result	Rank
Ken Thepthida	100 metres T13	11.72	6	Did not advance	

== See also ==
- Laos at the 2020 Summer Olympics
