= Laos at the Olympics =

- IOC code: LAO
- NOC: National Olympic Committee of Lao
- Medals: Gold 0 Silver 0 Bronze 0 Total 0

Summer appearances
- 1980; 1984; 1988; 1992; 1996; 2000; 2004; 2008; 2012; 2016; 2020; 2024; 2028

Laos, officially the Lao People's Democratic Republic, has competed in 11 Summer Olympic Games. The nation has not participated at the Winter Olympic Games and also have not yet won an Olympic medal, but it did get a bronze in the Paralympics.

The National Olympic Committee of Laos was formed in 1975 and officially recognized by the International Olympic Committee in 1979.

== Medal tables ==
=== Medals by Summer Games ===
Games	Athletes	Gold	Silver	Bronze	Total	Rank
1980 Moscow	20	0	0	0	0	–
1984 Los Angeles	boycotted					
1988 Seoul	3	0	0	0	0	–
1992 Barcelona	6	0	0	0	0	–
1996 Atlanta	5	0	0	0	0	–
2000 Sydney	3	0	0	0	0	–
2004 Athens	5	0	0	0	0	–
2008 Beijing	4	0	0	0	0	–
2012 London	3	0	0	0	0	–
2016 Rio de Janeiro	6	0	0	0	0	–
2020 Tokyo	4	0	0	0	0	–
2024 Paris	4	0	0	0	0	–
2028 Los Angeles	future event					
2032 Brisbane	future event					
Total		0	0	0	0	–

== See also ==
- List of flag bearers for Laos at the Olympics
- Laos at the Paralympics
