= Laos at the 2024 Summer Paralympics =

- IPC code: LAO
- NPC: Lao Paralympic Committee

in Paris, France August 28, 2024 – September 8, 2024
- Competitors: 1 in 1 sport
- Flag bearer: Ken Thepthida
- Medals: Gold 0 Silver 0 Bronze 0 Total 0

Summer Paralympics appearances (overview)
- 2000; 2004; 2008; 2012; 2016; 2020; 2024

The Lao People's Democratic Republic competed at the 2024 Summer Paralympics in Paris, France, from 28 August to 8 September 2024. This was the nation's sixth time competing at the Summer Paralympic Games after it made its debut at the 2000 Summer Paralympics. The delegation consisted of only one competitor from one sport.

== Competitors ==
The following is the list of number of competitors in the Games.

Sport	Men	Women	Total
Athletics	1	0	1
Total	1	0	1

== Athletics ==
Athlete	Event	Final	
Athlete	Event	Result	Rank
Ken Thepthida	Men's long jump T13	NM	=

== See also ==
- Laos at the 2024 Summer Olympics
- Laos at the Paralympics
