= Athletics at the 1980 Summer Olympics – Men's 20 kilometres walk =

Men's 20 kilometres walk at the Games of the XXII Olympiad
- Venue: Central Lenin Stadium
- Date: 24 July
- Competitors: 34 from 20 nations
- Winning time: 1:23:35.5

Medalists
1st place, gold medalist(s)		Maurizio Damilano; Italy
2nd place, silver medalist(s)		Pyotr Pochenchuk; Soviet Union
3rd place, bronze medalist(s)		Roland Wieser; East Germany

The Men's 20 km Race Walk at the 1980 Summer Olympics in Moscow, USSR had an entry list of 34 competitors. Seven athletes were disqualified and two did not finish in the final, which was held on Thursday, 24 July 1980.

The race occurred on a very hot and humid day in the Grand Arena of Central Lenin Stadium. The defending champion of the Montreal summer games, Daniel Bautista of Mexico, led along with Soviet Anatoly Solomin for the majority of the race. However, Bautista was disqualified less than two kilometres from the finish and Solomin a few 100 metres later. There were a total of 136 caution flags and seven disqualifications during the course of the race.

In what was considered a major upset, Maurizio Damilano of Italy won the gold with a finishing time of 1-23:35.5, over a minute faster than silver medalist Pyotr Pochinchuk of Belarus, competing for the USSR. Roland Wieser took the bronze for East Germany, the country with the second highest medal total at these Olympics after the USSR.

Also notable was the 18-year-old 25th place finisher, Thipsamay Chanthaphone, who was competing for Laos in its first Olympic appearance. Chanthaphone completed the 20 kilometres in 2:20:22.0, finishing during the medal ceremony almost 57 minutes after Damilano's win and 31 minutes after 24th place.

== Results ==
Rank	Athlete	Nation	Time	Time behind	Notes
1st place, gold medalist(s)	Maurizio Damilano	Italy	1:23:35.5		
2nd place, silver medalist(s)	Pyotr Pochynchuk	Soviet Union	1:24:45.4		
3rd place, bronze medalist(s)	Roland Wieser	East Germany	1:25:58.2		
4	Yevgeniy Yevsyukov	Soviet Union	1:26:28.3		
5	Josep Marín	Spain	1:26:45.6		
6	Raúl González	Mexico	1:27:48.6		
7	Bohdan Bułakowski	Poland	1:28:36.3		
8	Karl-Heinz Stadtmüller	East Germany	1:29:21.7		
9	Reima Salonen	Finland	1:31:32.0		
10	Roger Mills	Great Britain	1:32:37.8		
11	Giorgio Damilano	Italy	1:33:26.2		
12	János Szálas	Hungary	1:34:10.5		
13	Alf Brandt	Sweden	1:34:44.0		
14	Pavol Blažek	Czechoslovakia	1:35:30.8		
15	Aristidis Karageorgos	Greece	1:36:53.4		
16	Hunde Toure	Ethiopia	1:37:16.6		
17	Enrique Peña	Colombia	1:38:00.0		
18	Ranjit Singh	India	1:38:27.2		
19	Ernesto Alfaro	Colombia	1:42:19.7		
20	Jozef Pribilinec	Czechoslovakia	1:42:52.4		
21	Martin Toporek	Austria	1:44:56.0		
22	Johann Siegele	Austria	1:45:17.8		
23	Tekeste Mitiku	Ethiopia	1:45:45.7		
24	Stefano Casali	San Marino	1:49:21.3		
25	Thipsamay Chanthaphone	Laos	2:20:22.0		
—	Lucien Faber	Luxembourg	DNF		
—	Wilfried Siegele	Austria	DNF		
—	Anatoliy Solomin	Soviet Union	DNS		
—	Daniel Bautista	Mexico	DNS		
—	Bo Gustafsson	Sweden	DNS		
—	David Smith	Australia	DNS		
—	Domingo Colín	Mexico	DNS		
—	Werner Heyer	East Germany	DNS		
—	Juraj Benčík	Czechoslovakia	DNS		

== See also ==
- 1982 Men's European Championships 20 km Walk (Athens)
- 1983 Men's World Championships 20 km Walk (Helsinki)
- 1986 Men's European Championships 20 km Walk (Stuttgart)
