= Athletics at the 2015 SEA Games – Men's 10,000 metres =

Men's 10,000 meters event at the 2015 SEA Games

The men's 10000 metres at the 2015 SEA Games was held in National Stadium, Singapore. The track and field events took place on June 10.

== Schedule ==
All times are (UTC+08:00)

Date	Time	Event
Wednesday, 10 June 2015	16:40	Final

== Records ==
Prior to this competition, the existing world, Asian, and Southeast Asian Games records were as follows.

World Record	Kenenisa Bekele (ETH)	26:17.53	Brussels, Belgium	26 August 2005
Asian Record	Ahmad Hassan Abdullah (QAT)	26:38.76	Brussels, Belgium	5 September 2003
Games Record	Eduardo Buenavista (PHI)	29:19.62	Hanoi, Vietnam	7 December 2003

== Results ==
Legend

- SB — Seasonal Best
- PB — Personal Best
- DNS — Did Not Start

Rank	Athlete	Time	Note	
1st place, gold medalist(s)	Agus Prayogo (INA)	29:41.56	SB	Video on YouTube Official Video
2nd place, silver medalist(s)	Boonthung Srisung (THA)	30:05.22	SB	Video on YouTube Official Video
3rd place, bronze medalist(s)	San Naing (MYA)	30:26.23	PB	Video on YouTube Official Video
4	Do Quoc Luat (VIE)	30:48.95	PB	Video on YouTube Official Video
5	Sanchai Namkhet (THA)	31:21.38		Video on YouTube Official Video
6	Nguyen Van Lai (VIE)	32:25.43		Video on YouTube Official Video
7	Melvin Wong Yan Hao (SIN)	32:59.10	PB	Video on YouTube Official Video
8	Sysavath Thammavongchith (LAO)	33:02.86		Video on YouTube Official Video
	Soe Min Thu (MYA)		DNS	
