= Athletics at the 2013 SEA Games – Women's long jump =

The women's long jump at the 2013 SEA Games was held in Naypyidaw, Myanmar. The track and field events took place at the Wunna Theikdi Stadiumon December 18.

== Schedule ==
All times are Myanmar Standard Time (UTC+06:30)

Date	Time	Event
Wednesday, 18 December 2013	14:30	Final

== Records ==
Prior to this competition, the existing world, Asian, and Southeast Asian Games records were as follows.

World Record	Galina Chistyakova (URS)	7.52	Leningrad, Soviet Union	11 June 1988
Asian Record	Yao Weili (CHN)	7.01	Jinan, China	5 June 1993
Games Record	Marestella Torres (PHI)	6.71	Palembang, Indonesia	12 November 2011

== Results ==
Legend

- X — Failure
- NM — No Mark
- DNS — Did Not Start

Rank	Athlete	Attempts						Result	Notes
Rank	Athlete	1	2	3	4	5	6	Result	Notes
1st place, gold medalist(s)	Maria Londa (INA)	?	?	?	?	?	?	6.39	
2nd place, silver medalist(s)	Thitima Muangjan (THA)	?	?	?	?	?	?	6.24	
3rd place, bronze medalist(s)	Bui Thi Thu Thao (VIE)	?	?	?	?	?	?	6.14	
4	Katherine Khay Santos (PHI)	?	?	?	?	?	?	5.93	
5	Vu Thi Men (VIE)	?	?	?	?	?	?	5.89	PB
6	Wassana Winatho (THA)	?	?	?	?	?	?	5.82	
7	Myint Myint Wai (MYA)	?	?	?	?	?	?	5.42	
8	Laenly Phoutthavong (LAO)	?	?	?	?	?	?	5.41	NR
9	Lwin Thandar Oo (MYA)	?	?	?				4.70	
—	Noor Amira Mohamad Nafiah (MAS)							DNS	
—	Noor Shahidatun Nadia Mohd Zuki (MAS)							DNS	
