= Laos at the 1996 Summer Olympics =

- IOC code: LAO
- NOC: National Olympic Committee of Lao

in Atlanta
- Competitors: 5 (4 men and 1 woman) in 1 sport
- Flag bearer: Thongdy Amnouayphone
- Medals: Gold 0 Silver 0 Bronze 0 Total 0

Summer Olympics appearances (overview)
- 1980; 1984; 1988; 1992; 1996; 2000; 2004; 2008; 2012; 2016; 2020; 2024

Laos competed at the 1996 Summer Olympics in Atlanta, United States.

== Results by event ==
=== Athletics ===
Women's marathon

- Sirivanh Ketavong – 3:25.16 (→ 64th place)

Men' 4 × 100 metres relay

- Poutavanh Phengthalangsy, Thongdy Amnouayphone, Sisomphone Vongpharkdy, Souliyasak Ketkeolatsami – 44.14 (→ 31st place)
