= Laos at the 2004 Summer Olympics =

- IOC code: LAO
- NOC: National Olympic Committee of Lao

in Athens
- Competitors: 5 in 3 sports
- Flag bearer: Chamleunesouk Ao Oudomphonh
- Medals: Gold 0 Silver 0 Bronze 0 Total 0

Summer Olympics appearances (overview)
- 1980; 1984; 1988; 1992; 1996; 2000; 2004; 2008; 2012; 2016; 2020; 2024

Laos competed at the 2004 Summer Olympics in Athens, Greece, from 13 to 29 August 2004. This was the nation's sixth appearance at the Olympics, having attended every edition of the Olympiad since 1980 except the 1984 Summer Olympics in Los Angeles, because of the Soviet boycott.

Five Laotian athletes were selected to the team by wild card entries in archery, athletics, and swimming, without having qualified. Sprinter Chamleunesouk Ao Oudomphonh was the nation's flag bearer at the opening ceremony.

Laos has yet to win its first Olympic medal.

== Archery ==
One Laotian archer qualified for the men's individual archery through a tripartite invitation.

Athlete	Event	Ranking round		Round of 64	Round of 32	Round of 16	Quarterfinals	Semifinals	Final / BM	
Athlete	Event	Score	Seed	Opposition Score	Opposition Score	Opposition Score	Opposition Score	Opposition Score	Opposition Score	Rank
Phoutlamphay Thiamphasone	Men's individual	557	63	Petersson (SWE); L 95–158	did not advance					

== Athletics ==
Laotian athletes have so far achieved qualifying standards in the following athletics events (up to a maximum of 3 athletes in each event at the 'A' Standard, and 1 at the 'B' Standard).

Key

- Note–Ranks given for track events are within the athlete's heat only
- Q = Qualified for the next round
- q = Qualified for the next round as a fastest loser or, in field events, by position without achieving the qualifying target
- NR = National record
- N/A = Round not applicable for the event
- Bye = Athlete not required to compete in round

Men

Athlete	Event	Heat		Quarterfinal		Semifinal		Final	
Athlete	Event	Result	Rank	Result	Rank	Result	Rank	Result	Rank
Chamleunesouk Ao Oudomphonh	100 m	11.30	7	did not advance					

Women

Athlete	Event	Heat		Quarterfinal		Semifinal		Final	
Athlete	Event	Result	Rank	Result	Rank	Result	Rank	Result	Rank
Philaylack Sackpraseuth	100 m	13.42	8	did not advance					

== Swimming ==
Men

Athlete	Event	Heat		Semifinal		Final	
Athlete	Event	Time	Rank	Time	Rank	Time	Rank
Bounthanom Vongphachanh	50 m freestyle	28.17	77	did not advance			

Women

Athlete	Event	Heat		Semifinal		Final	
Athlete	Event	Time	Rank	Time	Rank	Time	Rank
Vilayphone Vongphachanh	50 m freestyle	36.57	73	did not advance			

== See also ==
- Laos at the 2002 Asian Games
