= Laos at the 1980 Summer Olympics =

- IOC code: LAO
- NOC: National Olympic Committee of Lao

in Moscow
- Competitors: 20 in 3 sports
- Flag bearer: Panh Khemanith (Athletics)
- Medals: Gold 0 Silver 0 Bronze 0 Total 0

Summer Olympics appearances (overview)
- 1980; 1984; 1988; 1992; 1996; 2000; 2004; 2008; 2012; 2016; 2020; 2024

Laos competed in the Olympic Games for the first time at the 1980 Summer Olympics in Moscow, USSR.

== Results by event ==
=== Athletics ===
Men's 100 metres

- Soutsakhone Somninhom

- Heat — 11.69 (→ did not advance)

Men's 200 metres

- Sitthixay Sacpraseuth

- Heat — 24.28 (→ did not advance)

Men's 800 metres

- Vongdeuane Phongsavanh

- Heat — 2:05.5 (→ did not advance)

Men's 20 km Walk

- Thipsamay Chanthaphone

- Final — 2:20:22.0 (→ 25th place)

Women's 100 metres

- Seuth Khampa

- Heat — 14.62 (→ did not advance)

- Boualong Boungnavong
- Vongdeuane Phongsavanh

=== Boxing ===
Men's Light Flyweight (48 kg)

- Singkham Phongprathith
  1. First Round — Lost to Pedro Manuel Nieves (Venezuela) after referee stopped contest in first round

Men's Bantamweight (54 kg)

- Souneat Ouphaphone
  1. First Round — Bye
  2. Second Round — Lost to Fayez Zaghloul (Syria) on points (5–0)

Men's Featherweight (57 kg)

- Takto Youtiya Homrasmy
  1. First Round — Bye
  2. Second Round — Lost to Winfred Kabunda (Zambia) after referee stopped contest in first round

Men's Lightweight (60 kg)

- Bounphisith Songkhamphou
  1. First Round — Lost to Kazimierz Adach (Poland) after referee stopped contest in second round

Men's Light-Welterweight (63.5 kg)

- Kampanath
  1. First Round — Lost to Farez Halabi (Syria) on points (2–3)
