= Laos at the 2020 Summer Olympics =

- IOC code: LAO
- NOC: National Olympic Committee of Lao

in Tokyo, Japan July 23, 2021 – August 8, 2021
- Competitors: 4 in 3 sports
- Flag bearers (opening): Silina Pha Aphay; Santisouk Inthavong
- Flag bearer (closing): Siri Arun Budcharern
- Medals: Gold 0 Silver 0 Bronze 0 Total 0

Summer Olympics appearances (overview)
- 1980; 1984; 1988; 1992; 1996; 2000; 2004; 2008; 2012; 2016; 2020; 2024

Laos, officially the Lao People's Democratic Republic, competed at the 2020 Summer Olympics in Tokyo. Originally scheduled to take place from 24 July to 9 August 2020, the Games were postponed to 23 July to 8 August 2021, due to the COVID-19 pandemic. This was the nation's tenth appearance at the Olympics, since its debut in 1980.

== Competitors ==
The following is the list of number of competitors in the Games.

Sport	Men	Women	Total
Athletics	0	1	1
Judo	1	0	1
Swimming	1	1	2
Total	2	2	4

== Athletics ==
Laos received a universality slot from the World Athletics to send a female track and field athlete to the Olympics.

Key

- Note–Ranks given for track events are within the athlete's heat only
- Q = Qualified for the next round
- q = Qualified for the next round as a fastest loser or, in field events, by position without achieving the qualifying target
- NR = National record
- N/A = Round not applicable for the event
- Bye = Athlete not required to compete in round

Track & road events

Athlete	Event	Preliminary		Heat		Semifinal		Final	
Athlete	Event	Result	Rank	Result	Rank	Result	Rank	Result	Rank
Silina Pha Aphay	Women's 100 m	12.41	6	Did not advance					

== Judo ==
Laos entered one male judoka into the Olympic tournament based on the International Judo Federation Olympics Individual Ranking.

Athlete	Event	Round of 32	Round of 16	Quarterfinals	Semifinals	Repechage	Final / BM	
Athlete	Event	Opposition Result	Opposition Result	Opposition Result	Opposition Result	Opposition Result	Opposition Result	Rank
Soukphaxay Sithisane	Men's −60 kg	Takabatake (BRA); L 00–10	Did not advance					

== Swimming ==
Laos received a universality invitation from FINA to send two top-ranked swimmers (one per gender) in their respective individual events to the Olympics, based on the FINA Points System of June 28, 2021.

Athlete	Event	Heat		Semifinal		Final	
Athlete	Event	Time	Rank	Time	Rank	Time	Rank
Santisouk Inthavong	Men's 50 m freestyle	26.04	59	Did not advance			
Siri Arun Budcharern	Women's 50 m freestyle	29.22	64	Did not advance			
