= Laos at the 2016 Summer Olympics =

- IOC code: LAO
- NOC: National Olympic Committee of Lao

in Rio de Janeiro
- Competitors: 6 in 4 sports
- Flag bearer: Xaysa Anousone
- Medals: Gold 0 Silver 0 Bronze 0 Total 0

Summer Olympics appearances (overview)
- 1980; 1984; 1988; 1992; 1996; 2000; 2004; 2008; 2012; 2016; 2020; 2024

Laos, officially the Lao People's Democratic Republic, competed at the 2016 Summer Olympics in Rio de Janeiro, Brazil, from 5 to 21 August 2016. This was the nation's ninth appearance at the Summer Olympics, having attended all games since 1980 with the exception of the 1984 Summer Olympics in Los Angeles, because of the Soviet boycott.

Six athletes, four men and two women, were selected to the Laotian team through universality places and Tripartite Commission invitations across four sports, without having qualified. Apart from athletics and swimming, Laos marked its Olympic debut in road cycling and judo. Among the Laotian athletes were London 2012 Olympians Laenly Phoutthavong (women's 100 m) in track and field and Santisouk Inthavong (men's 50 m freestyle) in swimming, professional road cyclist Ariya Phounsavath, and hurdler Xaysa Anousone, who led the delegation as the nation's flag bearer in the opening ceremony. Laos has yet to win its first Olympic medal.

== Athletics ==
Laos has received universality slots from IAAF to send two athletes (one male and one female) to the Olympics.

Key

- Note–Ranks given for track events are within the athlete's heat only
- Q = Qualified for the next round
- q = Qualified for the next round as a fastest loser or, in field events, by position without achieving the qualifying target
- NR = National record
- N/A = Round not applicable for the event
- Bye = Athlete not required to compete in round

Track & road events

Athlete	Event	Heat		Quarterfinal		Semifinal		Final	
Athlete	Event	Time	Rank	Time	Rank	Time	Rank	Time	Rank
Xaysa Anousone	Men's 110 m hurdles	14.40	7	—N/a		Did not advance			
Laenly Phoutthavong	Women's 100 m	12.82	7	Did not advance					

== Cycling ==
=== Road ===
Laos has received an invitation from the Tripartite Commission to send a rider competing in the men's road race for the first time to the Olympics.

Athlete	Event	Time	Rank
Ariya Phounsavath	Men's road race	Did not finish	

== Judo ==
Laos has received an invitation from the Tripartite Commission to send a judoka competing in the men's extra-lightweight category (60 kg) to the Olympics, signifying the nation's Olympic debut in the sport.

Athlete	Event	Round of 64	Round of 32	Round of 16	Quarterfinals	Semifinals	Repechage	Final / BM	
Athlete	Event	Opposition Result	Opposition Result	Opposition Result	Opposition Result	Opposition Result	Opposition Result	Opposition Result	Rank
Soukphaxay Sithisane	Men's −60 kg	Tsai M-y (TPE); L 000–111	Did not advance						

== Swimming ==
Laos has received a Universality invitation from FINA to send two swimmers (one male and one female) to the Olympics.

Athlete	Event	Heat		Semifinal		Final	
Athlete	Event	Time	Rank	Time	Rank	Time	Rank
Santisouk Inthavong	Men's 50 m freestyle	26.54	69	Did not advance			
Siri Arun Budcharern	Women's 50 m freestyle	32.55	76	Did not advance			
