= Aderholt =

Aderholt is the Americanized spelling of the North German surname Aderhold. People with this surname include:

- Harry C. Aderholt (1920–2010), American air force brigadier general
- Morrie Aderholt (1915–1955), American baseball player
- Robert Aderholt (born 1965), American politician
