= Laos at the 1988 Summer Olympics =

- IOC code: LAO
- NOC: National Olympic Committee of Lao

in Seoul
- Competitors: 3 in 2 sports
- Flag bearer: Sitthixay Sacpraseuth
- Medals: Gold 0 Silver 0 Bronze 0 Total 0

Summer Olympics appearances (overview)
- 1980; 1984; 1988; 1992; 1996; 2000; 2004; 2008; 2012; 2016; 2020; 2024; 2028

Laos competed at the 1988 Summer Olympics in Seoul, South Korea. The nation returned to the Olympic Games after being part of the Soviet-led boycott of the 1984 Summer Olympics.

== Competitors ==
The following is the list of number of competitors in the Games.

Sport	Men	Women	Total
Athletics	0	1	1
Boxing	2	–	2
Total	2	1	3

== Athletics ==
=== Women ===
==== Track events ====
Athlete	Events	Heat		Semifinal		Final	
Athlete	Events	Time	Position	Time	Position	Time	Position
Mala Sakonninhorn	100 m	15.12	64	Did not advance			

== Boxing ==
Athlete	Event	Round of 64	Round of 32	Round of 16	Quarterfinals	Semifinals	Final
Athlete	Event	Opposition Result	Opposition Result	Opposition Result	Opposition Result	Opposition Result	Opposition Result
Phetsmone Sonnavanh	Bantamweight	Joilson Santana (BRA); L 5-0	Did not advance				
Bounmy Thephavong	Light Flyweight		Sadoon Aboub (IRQ); L RSCH	Did not advance			
