= Laos at the 2012 Summer Paralympics =

- IPC code: LAO
- NPC: Lao Paralympic Committee

in London
- Competitors: 1 in 1 sport
- Medals: Gold 0 Silver 0 Bronze 0 Total 0

Summer Paralympics appearances (overview)
- 2000; 2004; 2008; 2012; 2016; 2020; 2024

Laos competed, officially as the Lao People's Democratic Republic, at the 2012 Summer Paralympics in London, United Kingdom, from August 29 to September 9. It was the country's third participation in the Paralympic Games.

Laos was represented by a single athlete, Eay Simay in powerlifting. Simay took part in his third Paralympics; at the Beijing Games in 2008, he won Laos' first Paralympic medal, a bronze.

== Powerlifting ==
Eay Simay competed in the men's under 48kg event.

Athlete	Event	Total lifted	Rank
Eay Simay	Men's -48 kg	155	4th

== See also ==
- Summer Paralympic disability classification
- Laos at the Paralympics
- Laos at the 2012 Summer Olympics
