= Laos at the 2023 World Athletics Championships =

- Flag of Laos
- WA code: LAO

in Budapest, Hungary 19 August 2023 – 27 August 2023
- Competitors: 1 (0 men and 1 woman)
- Medals: Gold 0 Silver 0 Bronze 0 Total 0

World Athletics Championships appearances
- 1993; 1995; 1997; 1999; 2001; 2003; 2005; 2007; 2009; 2011; 2013; 2015; 2017; 2019; 2022; 2023; 2025

Laos competed at the 2023 World Athletics Championships in Budapest, Hungary, which were held from 19 to 27 August 2023. The athlete delegation of the country was composed of one competitor, sprinter Silina Pha Aphay who competed in the women's 100 metres. She qualified for the Championships upon being selected by the Lao Amateur Athletic Federation. In the preliminary round, Aphay placed last in her heat and failed to advance further to the semifinals.

== Background ==
The 2023 World Athletics Championships in Budapest, Hungary, were held from 19 to 27 August 2023. The Championships were held at the National Athletics Centre. To qualify for the World Championships, athletes had to reach an entry standard (e.g. time or distance), place in a specific position at select competitions, be a wild card entry, or qualify through their World Athletics Ranking at the end of the qualification period.

As Laos did not meet any of the four standards, they could send either one male or one female athlete in one event of the Championships who has not yet qualified. The Lao Amateur Athletic Federation selected sprinter Silina Pha Aphay, who would compete in the women's 100 metres. In the entry list for the Championships, she held a personal best of 12.31 seconds and a season's best of 12.64 seconds in the event.

== Results ==
Key

- Q = Qualified for the next round
- q = Qualified for the next round as a fastest loser or, in field events, by position without achieving the qualifying target
- NR = National record
- PB = Personal best
- SB = Season best
- N/A = Round not applicable for the event

=== Women ===
Aphay competed in the third preliminary heat on 20 August against seven other sprinters. There, she recorded a time of 12.67 seconds and placed last in her heat, failing to advance further as only the top three of each heat and the three next fastest sprinters would be able to qualify for the semifinals.

Track and road events

Athlete	Event	Heat		Semifinal		Final	
Athlete	Event	Result	Rank	Result	Rank	Result	Rank
Silina Pha Aphay	100 metres	12.67	8	Did not advance			
