= Athletics at the 2015 SEA Games – Women's long jump =

Video on YouTube Official Video

The women's long jump at the 2015 SEA Games was held in National Stadium, Singapore. The track and field events took place on June 10.

== Schedule ==
All times are (UTC+08:00)

Date	Time	Event
Wednesday, 10 June 2015	16:30	Final

== Records ==
Prior to this competition, the existing world, Asian, and Southeast Asian Games records were as follows.

World Record	Galina Chistyakova (URS)	7.52	Leningrad, Soviet Union	11 June 1988
Asian Record	Yao Weili (CHN)	7.01	Jinan, China	5 June 1993
Games Record	Marestella Torres (PHI)	6.71	Palembang, Indonesia	12 November 2011

== Results ==
Legend

- X — Failure
- NM — No Mark
- DNS — Did Not Start

Rank	Athlete	Attempts						Result	Notes
Rank	Athlete	1	2	3	4	5	6	Result	Notes
1st place, gold medalist(s)	Maria Londa (INA)	X	6.04	6.70	X	-	X	6.70	PB
2nd place, silver medalist(s)	Bui Thi Thu Thao (VIE)	6.58	6.60	X	X	X	6.65	6.65	PB
3rd place, bronze medalist(s)	Marestella Torres (PHI)	6.24	X	6.39	X	6.27	6.41	6.41	
4	Katherine Khay Santos (PHI)	6.40	X	6.19	X	6.19	6.18	6.40	PB
5	Eugenia Tan Yan Ning (SIN)	6.18	X	5.82	X	X	5.53	6.18	PB
6	Nguyen Thi Truc Mai (VIE)	X	X	5.88	5.37	6.16	5.79	6.16	
7	Noor Amira Mohamad Nafiah (MAS)	X	6.08	6.01	X	5.91	5.80	6.08	
8	Thitima Muangjan (THA)	X	6.03	-	-	-	-	6.03	
9	Laenly Phoutthavong (LAO)	X	X	5.57				5.57	
10	Nurul Jannah Mohamed Zulkifli (SIN)	X	5.43	5.39				5.43	
