= Tekeste Mitiku =

Ethiopian racewalker

Personal information
- Nationality: Ethiopian
- Born: 9 November 1961 (age 64)

Sport
- Sport: Athletics
- Event: Racewalking

Tekeste Mitiku (born 9 November 1961) is an Ethiopian racewalker. He competed in the men's 20 kilometres walk at the 1980 Summer Olympics.
