= Laos at the 1992 Summer Olympics =

- IOC code: LAO
- NOC: National Olympic Committee of Lao

in Barcelona
- Competitors: 6 in 2 sports
- Flag bearer: Khamsavath Vilayphone
- Medals: Gold 0 Silver 0 Bronze 0 Total 0

Summer Olympics appearances (overview)
- 1980; 1984; 1988; 1992; 1996; 2000; 2004; 2008; 2012; 2016; 2020; 2024

Laos competed at the 1992 Summer Olympics in Barcelona, Spain.

== Competitors ==
The following is the list of number of competitors in the Games.

Sport	Men	Women	Total
Athletics	5	0	5
Boxing	1	–	1
Total	6	0	6

== Results by event ==
=== Athletics ===
Men's 100m metres

- Sitthixay Sacpraseuth

- Heat — 12.02 (→ did not advance)

Men's 200m metres

- Bounhom Siliphone

- Heat — 23.64 (→ did not advance)

Men's 400m metres

- Vanxay Sinebandith

- Heat — 51.71 (→ did not advance)

Men's 1500m metres

- Khambieng Khamiar

- Heat — 4:04.82 (→ did not advance)

Men's 20 km Walk

- Saleumphone Sopraseut — DSQ (→ no ranking)
