= Vladimir Balynetc =

Russian Paralympic powerlifter

Personal information
- Born: 25 April 1985 (age 41)
Medal record
Representing Russia
Men's powerlifting
Paralympic Games
Silver medal – second place	2012 London	−48 kg
World Championships
Bronze medal – third place	2014 Dubai	−49 kg

Vladimir Balynetc (born 25 April 1985) is a powerlifter from Russia. At the 2012 Summer Paralympics he won a silver medal in the men's 48 kg powerlifting event, lifting 170 kg (375 lb).

In November 2013, he served as one of the torch bearers in Yakutsk for the 2014 Winter Olympics torch relay.

== Awards ==
- Order of the Polar Star (2012)
