= Laos at the 2008 Summer Olympics =

- IOC code: LAO
- NOC: National Olympic Committee of Laos

in Beijing
- Competitors: 4 in 2 sports
- Flag bearer: Souksavanh Tonsacktheva
- Medals: Gold 0 Silver 0 Bronze 0 Total 0

Summer Olympics appearances (overview)
- 1980; 1984; 1988; 1992; 1996; 2000; 2004; 2008; 2012; 2016; 2020; 2024

Laos was represented at the 2008 Summer Olympics in Beijing, China by the National Olympic Committee of Laos.

In total, four athletes including two men and two women represented Laos in two different sports including athletics and swimming.

== Competitors ==
In total, four athletes represented Laos at the 2008 Summer Olympics in Beijing, China across two different sports.

Sport	Men	Women	Total
Athletics	1	1	2
Swimming	1	1	2
Total	2	2	4

== Athletics ==
In total, two Laotian athletes participated in the athletics events – Philaylack Sackpaseuth in the women's 100 m and Souksavanh Tonsacktheva in the men's 100 m.

The heats for the men's 100 m took place on 15 August 2008. Tonsacktheva finished eighth in his heat in a time of 11.51 seconds and he did not advance to the quarter-finals.

Athlete	Event	Heat		Quarterfinal		Semifinal		Final	
Athlete	Event	Result	Rank	Result	Rank	Result	Rank	Result	Rank
Souksavanh Tonsacktheva	100 m	11.51	8	Did not advance					

The heats for the women's 100 m took place on 16 August 2008. Sackpraseuth finished ninth in her heat in a time of 13.86 seconds and she did not advance to the quarter-finals. This was later upgraded to eighth after Tezdzhan Naimova was disqualified for tampering with doping controls.

Athlete	Event	Heat		Quarterfinal		Semifinal		Final	
Athlete	Event	Result	Rank	Result	Rank	Result	Rank	Result	Rank
Philaylack Sackpaseuth	100 m	13.82	9	Did not advance					

== Swimming ==
In total, two Laotian athletes participated in the swimming events – Thepphithak Chindavong in the men's 50 m freestyle and Vilayphone Vongphachanh in the women's 50 m freestyle.

The heats for the men's 50 m freestyle took place on 14 August 2008. Chindavong finished first in his heat in a time of 29.31 seconds which was ultimately not fast enough to advance to the semi-finals.

Athlete	Event	Heat		Semifinal		Final	
Athlete	Event	Time	Rank	Time	Rank	Time	Rank
Thepphithak Chindavong	50 m freestyle	29.31	90	Did not advance			

The heats for the women's 50 m freestyle took place on 15 August 2008. Vongphachanh finished fifth in her heat in a time of 34.79 seconds which was ultimately not fast enough to advance to the semi-finals.

Athlete	Event	Heat		Semifinal		Final	
Athlete	Event	Time	Rank	Time	Rank	Time	Rank
Vilayphone Vongphachanh	50 m freestyle	34.79	84	Did not advance			
