= Aderhold =

Aderhold is a German surname. Notable people with the surname include:

- Dieter Aderhold (1939–1989), German politician
- Karl Aderhold (1884–1921), German politician
- Omer Clyde Aderhold (1899–1969), U.S. academic, president of the University of Georgia
- Rudolf Aderhold (1865–1907), German mycologist and pomologist
