= Vilayphone Vongphachanh =

Laotian swimmer

Personal information
- Nationality: Laos
- Born: April 26, 1989 (age 37) Laos
- Height: 1.55 m (5 ft 1 in)

Sport
- Sport: Swimming
- Strokes: Freestyle

Vilayphone Vongphachanh (born April 26, 1989) is a female Laotian Olympic freestyle swimmer. As a member of the Laos team she competed at the age of 15 in the 2004 Summer Olympics in the Women's 50m Freestyle. She also swam at the 2008 Olympics.

In 2004, she had the slowest time out of all 73 women in the event, 36.57 seconds. Her result was typical for Laos, which up to the 2004 games, has (with one exception) always placed last or next to last in every event it has competed in. In Laos, she was only able to train in a pool half the size of a standard Olympic size swimming pool, and like other Laotian athletes had limited times to do so. Sue Maci of Parade attributed the poor results to Laos being one of the ten poorest countries in the world.

Previously, in 2003, she competed in the 2003 World Championships in Barcelona, Spain. She ranked 98 out of 100 (finishers) in the 50m freestyle, and 57 out of 58 in the 50m breaststroke.

As of 2006 Vilayphone Vongphachanh is a swimming judge for the FINA Masters

In 2008, she finished 84th out of 92 swimmers with a time of 34.79 seconds, once again, she failed to qualify for the semi-finals.
