= Laos at the 2024 Summer Olympics =

- IOC code: LAO
- NOC: National Olympic Committee of Lao

in Paris, France 26 July 2024 – 11 August 2024
- Competitors: 4 (1 man and 3 women) in 3 sports
- Flag bearers: Steven Insixiengmay; Silina Pha Aphay
- Medals: Gold 0 Silver 0 Bronze 0 Total 0

Summer Olympics appearances (overview)
- 1980; 1984; 1988; 1992; 1996; 2000; 2004; 2008; 2012; 2016; 2020; 2024

Laos, officially the Lao People's Democratic Republic, competed at the 2024 Summer Olympics in Paris from 26 July to 11 August 2024. The country's participation in Paris marked its eleventh appearance at the games since its debut in 1980, and missing the 1984 Games due to the boycott.

== Background ==
The lead-up to the Games saw an event held at the French Embassy in Laos, to promote the Games by inviting Lao, ASEAN, and French competitors to compete in sporting activities such as badminton, basketball, boxing, pétanque, and table tennis.

== Competitors ==
The following is the list of number of competitors in the Games.

Sport	Men	Women	Total
Athletics	0	1	1
Gymnastics	0	1	1
Swimming	1	1	2
Total	1	3	4

== Athletics ==
Laos sent one sprinter to compete at the 2024 Summer Olympics.

Key

- Note–Ranks given for track events are within the athlete's heat only
- Q = Qualified for the next round
- q = Qualified for the next round as a fastest loser or, in field events, by position without achieving the qualifying target
- NR = National record
- N/A = Round not applicable for the event
- Bye = Athlete not required to compete in round

Track events

Athlete	Event	Preliminary		Heat		Semifinal		Final	
Athlete	Event	Result	Rank	Result	Rank	Result	Rank	Result	Rank
Silina Pha Aphay	Women's 100 m	12.45	6	Did not advance					

== Gymnastics ==
=== Rhythmic ===
Laos received a universality slot from the International Gymnastics Federation to send a female rhythmic gymnast to the Olympics. The slot went to Praewa Misato Philaphandeth, who will make her Olympic debut for the nation.

Athlete	Event	Qualification						Final					
Athlete	Event	Hoop	Ball	Clubs	Ribbon	Total	Rank	Hoop	Ball	Clubs	Ribbon	Total	Rank
Praewa Misato Philaphandeth	Individual	21.600	21.600	22.250	21.900	87.350	24	Did not advance					

== Swimming ==
Laos sent two swimmers to compete at the 2024 Paris Olympics.

Athlete	Event	Heat		Semifinal		Final	
Athlete	Event	Time	Rank	Time	Rank	Time	Rank
Steven Insixiengmay	Men's 100 m breaststroke	1:04.64	31	Did not advance			
Ariana Dirkzwager	Women's 200 m freestyle	2:07.22	25	Did not advance			
