= Thipsamay Chanthaphone =

Laotian racewalker

Personal information
- Nationality: Laotian
- Born: 24 July 1961 (age 64)

Sport
- Sport: Athletics
- Event: Racewalking

Thipsamay Chanthaphone (born 24 July 1961) is a Laotian racewalker. He competed in the men's 20 kilometres walk at the 1980 Summer Olympics.

== Career ==
Chanthaphone was Laos' first ever Olympic racewalker. He competed in the 20 km Olympic racewalk on his 19th birthday.

After arriving at the Central Lenin Stadium to finish the race, he was about one hour behind the rest of the field. He was met with a storm of applause. He originally stopped 80 metres (260 ft) short of the finish line. Spectators shouted at him to continue, but Chanthaphone reportedly understood the shouts to be more cheering, waving at them and taking a bow.

After yellow-jacketed officials told Chanthaphone he had to continue, he finished the race. He walked the 20 km course in 2 hours, 20 minutes, and 22 seconds, and continued racewalking even after the finish.

== Personal life ==
Chanthaphone was described as "happy-go-lucky" and "cheery". Until the 20 km racewalk was retired in 2024, Chanthaphone's finishing time remained 21 minutes slower than any other walker in Olympic history. Reportedly, "a legacy was born" following Chanthaphone's performance, and it was used as justification for supporting the Laotian team at the 2004 Olympics.

== See also ==
- Eric the Eel
