= Praewa Misato Philaphandeth =

Lao rhythmic gymnast

- Nicknames: Prey, Prae
- Born: 6 December 2004 (age 21)
- Height: 1.63 m (5 ft 4 in)

Gymnastics career
- Discipline: Rhythmic gymnastics
- Country represented: Laos
- College team: Kokushikan RG
- Training location: Japan
- Head coach: Rika Yamamoto
- Former coach: Zhou Tianke

Praewa Misato Philaphandeth (Lao: ແພຣວາ ມິສາໂຕ ພິລາພັນເດຊ; Thai: แพรวา มิซาโตะ พิลาพันธ์เดช; born 6 December 2004) is a Lao rhythmic gymnast. She represented Laos at the 2024 Summer Olympics in Women's rhythmic individual all-around on 8–9 August 2024. She is the first Lao rhythmic gymnast to compete at the Olympic Games, the World Championships, and the Southeast Asian Games.

== Early and personal life ==
Philaphandeth is of Lao, Thai, and Japanese descent. She began rhythmic gymnastics when she was eight years old. She attended the Singapore International School of Bangkok.

== Career ==
Philaphandeth competed at the 2021 Southeast Asian Games and was her country's first rhythmic gymnast to compete at the Southeast Asian Games. She also represented Laos at the 2022 Asian Games, held in 2023 due to the COVID-19 pandemic, and placed 20th in the all-around final.

In 2023, Philaphandeth placed 21st at the Asian Championships and qualified for the World Championships. She became the first gymnast from Laos to compete at the World Rhythmic Gymnastics Championships, and she finished 77th out of the 82 competitors. She competed at the 2024 Tashkent World Cup, finishing 44th in the all-around. Despite competing with a foot injury, she finished 20th in the all-around at the 2024 Asian Championships. She then competed at the 2024 Milan World Cup and finished 42nd in the all-around.

Philaphandeth was awarded the tripartite spot for the 2024 Summer Olympics. She was the first athlete selected to represent Laos at the 2024 Summer Olympics, and the first rhythmic gymnast to compete for Laos at the Olympic Games. She took 24th place in all-around qualifications and did not advance into all-around final.

== Competitive history ==
Competitive history of Praewa Misato Philaphandeth
| Year | Event | Team | AA | HP | BA | CL | RB |
2023
| 2023 | Asian Championships | | 21 | | | | |
| 2023 | Asian Games | | 20 | | | | |
| 2023 | World Championships | | 77 | | | | |
| 2024 | Tashkent World Cup | | 44 | | | | |
| 2024 | Asian Championships | | 20 | | | | |
| 2024 | Milan World Cup | | 42 | | | | |
| 2024 | Olympic Games | | 24 | | | | |
