= Laos at the 2000 Summer Olympics =

- IOC code: LAO
- NOC: National Olympic Committee of Lao

in Sydney
- Competitors: 3 (2 men and 1 woman) in 2 sports
- Flag bearer: Sisomphone Vongpharkdy
- Medals: Gold 0 Silver 0 Bronze 0 Total 0

Summer Olympics appearances (overview)
- 1980; 1984; 1988; 1992; 1996; 2000; 2004; 2008; 2012; 2016; 2020; 2024

Laos competed at the 2000 Summer Olympics in Sydney, Australia.

== Athletics ==
Key

- Q = Qualified for the next round by position in race or, in field events, by achieving the automatic qualification target
- q = Qualified for the next round as a fastest loser or, in field events, by position without achieving the qualifying target

Track and road events

| Athlete | Event | Heat | | Quarterfinal | | Semifinal | | Final | |
| Athlete | Event | Time | Rank | Time | Rank | Time | Rank | Time | Rank |
|---|---|---|---|---|---|---|---|---|---|
| Sisomphone Vongpharkdy | Men's 100 m | 11.47 | 94 | Did not advance | | | | | |
| Sirivanh Ketavong | Women's marathon | —N/a | | | | | | 3:34:27 | 45 |

== Swimming ==
| Athlete | Event | Heat | | Semifinal | | Final | |
| Athlete | Event | Time | Rank | Time | Rank | Time | Rank |
|---|---|---|---|---|---|---|---|
| Sikhounxay Ounkhamphanyavong | Men's 50 m freestyle | 27.03 | 70 | Did not advance | | | |
