= Powerlifting at the 2008 Summer Paralympics =

Powerlifting at the XIII Paralympic Games
- Paralympic Powerlifting
- Venue: Beihang University Gymnasium
- Dates: 9–16 September 2008

Powerlifting at the 2008 Summer Paralympics was held in the Beihang University Gymnasium from September 9 to September 16. Any athlete who met a minimum level of disability (as determined by the IPC Powerlifting Classification Committee) could take part in these events.

== Events ==
There were twenty powerlifting events, corresponding to ten weight classes each for men and women.

- Men's 48 kg
- Men's 52 kg
- Men's 56 kg
- Men's 60 kg
- Men's 67.5 kg
- Men's 75 kg
- Men's 82.5 kg
- Men's 90 kg
- Men's 100 kg
- Men's +100 kg

- Women's 40 kg
- Women's 44 kg
- Women's 48 kg
- Women's 52 kg
- Women's 56 kg
- Women's 60 kg
- Women's 67.5 kg
- Women's 75 kg
- Women's 82.5 kg
- Women's +82.5 kg

== Participating countries ==
There were 203 athletes (121 male, 82 female) from 74 nations taking part in this sport.

- Afghanistan (1)
- Armenia (1)
- Australia (3)
- Azerbaijan (3)
- Bahrain (1)
- Benin (1)
- Brazil (4)
- Bulgaria (2)
- China (16)
- Chinese Taipei (3)
- Colombia (1)
- Cuba (2)
- Czech Republic (1)
- Ecuador (2)
- Egypt (14)
- Finland (2)
- France (4)
- Georgia (1)
- Germany (1)
- Great Britain (4)
- Greece (5)
- Haiti (1)
- Hong Kong (1)
- Hungary (2)
- Iceland (1)
- India (2)
- Indonesia (1)
- Iran (7)
- Iraq (7)
- Ivory Coast (1)
- Japan (1)
- Jordan (4)
- Kazakhstan (1)
- Kenya (1)
- Kuwait (1)
- Kyrgyzstan (1)
- Laos (1)
- Latvia (1)
- Libya (1)
- Malaysia (4)
- Mexico (6)
- Moldova (1)
- Morocco (4)
- New Zealand (1)
- Niger (1)
- Nigeria (8)
- Oman (1)
- Pakistan (1)
- Peru (1)
- Philippines (1)
- Poland (10)
- Qatar (1)
- Romania (1)
- Russia (9)
- Saudi Arabia (1)
- Slovakia (2)
- South Africa (1)
- South Korea (4)
- Spain (1)
- Sri Lanka (1)
- Syria (4)
- Tajikistan (1)
- Thailand (7)
- Timor-Leste (1)
- Turkey (3)
- Turkmenistan (3)
- Uganda (1)
- Ukraine (7)
- United Arab Emirates (1)
- United States (2)
- Uzbekistan (1)
- Vanuatu (1)
- Venezuela (2)
- Vietnam (3)

== Medal summary ==
=== Medal table ===
This ranking sorts countries by the number of gold medals earned by their powerlifters (in this context a country is an entity represented by a National Paralympic Committee). The number of silver medals is taken into consideration next and then the number of bronze medals. If, after the above, countries are still tied, equal ranking is given and they are listed alphabetically.

| Rank | Nation | Gold | Silver | Bronze | Total |
|---|---|---|---|---|---|
| 1 | China (CHN) | 9 | 2 | 3 | 14 |
| 2 | Egypt (EGY) | 4 | 3 | 3 | 10 |
| 3 | Nigeria (NGR) | 2 | 3 | 1 | 6 |
| 4 | Iran (IRI) | 2 | 2 | 1 | 5 |
| 5 | Mexico (MEX) | 1 | 0 | 2 | 3 |
| 6 | Chinese Taipei (TPE) | 1 | 0 | 0 | 1 |
| 6 | Ukraine (UKR) | 1 | 0 | 0 | 1 |
| 8 | Russia (RUS) | 0 | 4 | 0 | 4 |
| 9 | Iraq (IRQ) | 0 | 1 | 1 | 2 |
| 9 | Jordan (JOR) | 0 | 1 | 1 | 2 |
| 9 | Poland (POL) | 0 | 1 | 1 | 2 |
| 12 | Australia (AUS) | 0 | 1 | 0 | 1 |
| 12 | Greece (GRE) | 0 | 1 | 0 | 1 |
| 12 | United Arab Emirates (UAE) | 0 | 1 | 0 | 1 |
| 15 | Thailand (THA) | 0 | 0 | 2 | 2 |
| 16 | France (FRA) | 0 | 0 | 1 | 1 |
| 16 | Laos (LAO) | 0 | 0 | 1 | 1 |
| 16 | Malaysia (MAS) | 0 | 0 | 1 | 1 |
| 16 | South Korea (KOR) | 0 | 0 | 1 | 1 |
| 16 | Syria (SYR) | 0 | 0 | 1 | 1 |
| Totals (20 entries) | | 20 | 20 | 20 | 60 |

=== Women's events ===
| Event | Gold | Silver | Bronze |
|---|---|---|---|
| 40 kg | Lidiya Solovyova; Ukraine | Cui Zhe; China | Laura Cerero; Mexico |
| 44 kg | Xiao Cuijuan; China | Justyna Kozdryk; Poland | Zeinab Sayed Oteify; Egypt |
| 48 kg | Lucy Ogechukwu Ejike; Nigeria | Olesya Lafina; Russia | Souhad Ghazouani; France |
| 52 kg | Amalia Perez; Mexico | Tamara Podpalnaya; Russia | Samkhoun Anon; Thailand |
| 56 kg | Fatma Omar; Egypt | Irina Kazantseva; Russia | Siow Lee Chan; Malaysia |
| 60 kg | Bian Jianxin; China | Amal Mahmoud Osman; Egypt | Patience Aghimile Igbiti; Nigeria |
| 67.5 kg | Fu Taoying; China | Amoge Victoria Nneji; Nigeria | Rasha Alshikh; Syria |
| 75 kg | Lin Tzu-hui; Chinese Taipei | Randa Tageldin Mohamed; Egypt | Zhang Liping; China |
| 82.5 kg | Heba Said Ahmed; Egypt | Zuo Jue; China | Perla Patricia Barcenas; Mexico |
| +82.5 kg | Li Ruifang; China | Grace Ebere Anozie; Nigeria | Nadia Mohamed Ali; Egypt |

=== Men's events ===
| Event | Gold | Silver | Bronze |
|---|---|---|---|
| 48 kg | Ruel Ishaku; Nigeria | Omar Qarada; Jordan | Eay Simay; Laos |
| 52 kg | Wu Guojing; China | Osama Elserngawy; Egypt | Narong Kasanun; Thailand |
| 56 kg | Sherif Othman; Egypt | Rasool Mohsin; Iraq | Jung Keum-Jong; South Korea |
| 60 kg | Hamzeh Mohammadi; Iran | Ayrat Zakiev; Russia | Shaaban Ibrahim; Egypt |
| 67.5 kg | Metwaly Ibrahim Mathna; Egypt | Ali Hosseini; Iran | Wu Maoshun; China |
| 75 kg | Liu Lei; China | Majid Farzin; Iran | Mu'taz Aljuneidi; Jordan |
| 82.5 kg | Zhang Haidong; China | Pavlos Mamalos; Greece | Thaer Al-Ali; Iraq |
| 90 kg | Cai Huichao; China | Mohammed Khamis Khalaf; United Arab Emirates | Ryszard Rogala; Poland |
| 100 kg | Qi Dong; China | Obioma Daleth Aligekwe; Nigeria | Ali Sadeghzadeh; Iran |
| +100 kg | Kazem Rajabi; Iran | Darren Gardiner; Australia | Li Bing; China |
