= Powerlifting at the 2012 Summer Paralympics – Men's 48 kg =

Powerlifting – Men's 48 kg at the XIV Paralympic Games
- Venue: ExCeL London
- Date: 30 August 2012
- Competitors: 11 from 11 nations
- Winning lift: 180.0 kg

Medalists
1st place, gold medalist(s)		Yakubu Adesokan	Nigeria
2nd place, silver medalist(s)		Vladimir Balynetc	Russia
3rd place, bronze medalist(s)		Taha Abdelmagid	Egypt

The men's 48 kg powerlifting event at the 2012 Summer Paralympics was contested on 30 August at ExCeL London.

== Records ==
Prior to the competition, the existing world and Paralympic records were as follows.

World record	177.0 kg	Yakubu Adesokan (NGR)	Dubai, United Arab Emirates	22 February 2012
Paralympic record	169.0 kg	Ruel Ishaku (NGR)	Beijing, China	9 September 2008

The world record holder, Yakubu Adesokan of Nigeria, broke both of these records during the competition.

== Results ==
Rank	Name	Group	Body weight (kg)	Attempts (kg)				Result (kg)
Rank	Name	Group	Body weight (kg)	1	2	3	4	Result (kg)
1st place, gold medalist(s)	Yakubu Adesokan (NGR)	A	46.49	172.0	178.0	180.0	–	180.0 WR
2nd place, silver medalist(s)	Vladimir Balynetc (RUS)	A	47.74	165.0	170.0	~~171.0~~	–	170.0
3rd place, bronze medalist(s)	Taha Abdelmagid (EGY)	A	47.15	160.0	165.0	~~170.0~~	–	165.0
4	Eay Simay (LAO)	A	46.97	~~152.0~~	155.0	~~165.0~~	–	155.0
5	Farman Basha (IND)	A	46.37	~~150.0~~	150.0	~~165.0~~	–	150.0
6	Patrick Ardon (FRA)	B	47.44	136.0	141.0	146.0	–	146.0
7	Nguyễn Văn Phúc (VIE)	A	47.01	145.0	~~148.0~~	~~148.0~~	–	145.0
8	Anthony Peddle (GBR)	B	46.97	135.0	140.0	~~145.0~~	–	140.0
9	Hiroshi Miura (JPN)	B	46.13	112.0	117.0	~~124.0~~	–	117.0
–	Anatolii Mykoliuk (UKR)	B	42.53	~~140.0~~	~~140.0~~	~~140.0~~	–	NMR
–	Yashin Shoberdiev (UZB)	B	46.96	~~80.0~~	~~82.0~~	~~82.0~~	–	NMR
