= 1989 Narragansett Bay oil spill =

Coordinates: 41.443°N 71.358°W

On June 23, 1989, several hundred thousand gallons of fuel oil were spilled at the mouth of the Narragansett Bay in Rhode Island after the tanker MV World Prodigy ran aground on a reef near Aquidneck Island.

World Prodigy, a 532 feet (162 m) long ship operated by Ballard Shipping under the Greek flag, was inbound to Providence and Tiverton, Rhode Island when at about 16:40 local time she ran aground on Brenton Reef, about 1 mile (1.6 km) offshore from Brenton Point State Park, after passing the wrong side of a buoy marking the channel. She had a cargo of about 8.1 million gallons of fuel oil. The grounding damaged four of the ship's eight cargo compartments; early reports indicated that as much as a million gallons of oil had spilled, but later estimates put the total at about 300,000 gallons. Oil covered about 50 square miles and washed up on shore, but due to its low viscosity and choppy seas that broke up the slick it evaporated fairly quickly. The Coast Guard estimated that the cleanup cost about $2 million.

The collision damaged the hull of World Prodigy in two places, but she was floated off the reef in early July and repaired at a shipyard in New York City.

After the collision, World Prodigy's captain, Iakovos Georgudis, was charged with two violations of the Clean Water Act and Ballard Shipping with one. Both the captain and company pleaded guilty; Ballard paid $1 million and Georgudis $10,000 in fines. In December 1990, the National Transportation Safety Board released the results of their investigation of the spill, finding that Captain Georgudis had been suffering from sleep deprivation and was distracted by working on paperwork at the time of the collision. World Prodigy, having arrived at the mouth of the bay earlier than planned, had not taken on a harbor pilot, and shortly before she ran aground, Captain Georgudis had sent both his first officer and watchman away from the bridge to work on other tasks, which the NTSB judged left the ship "without a qualified deck watch officer for several minutes prior to the grounding."
