= Nanda Zulmi =

Indonesian footballer

Personal information
- Full name: Nanda Zulmi
- Date of birth: 2 June 1989
- Place of birth: Bireuën, Aceh, Indonesia
- Date of death: 6 July 2017 (aged 28)
- Place of death: North Aceh, Aceh, Indonesia
- Height: 1.70 m (5 ft 7 in)
- Position: Midfielder

Senior career*
Years	Team	Apps	(Gls)
2011–2013	PSAP Sigli	7	(0)
- * Club domestic league appearances and goals as of 11 July 2012

Nanda Zulmi (2 June 1989 – 6 July 2017) was an Indonesian former footballer who played as a midfielder. He played for PSAP Sigli in the Indonesia Super League at the 2011–12 season.

== Club statistics ==
Club	Season	Super League		Premier Division		Piala Indonesia		Total	
Club	Season	Apps	Goals	Apps	Goals	Apps	Goals	Apps	Goals
PSAP Sigli	2011-12	7	0	-		-		7	0
Total		7	0	-		-		7	0
