= Sirivanh Ketavong =

Laotian long-distance runner

Personal information
- Nationality: Laotian
- Born: 1 September 1970 (age 55)

Sport
- Sport: Long-distance running
- Event: Marathon

Sirivanh Ketavong (born September 1, 1970) is a Laotian athlete.

Described as "the best female distance runner in Laos", one of the world's poorest countries with few training facilities, Ketavong competed in the marathon at the 1996 Summer Olympics in Atlanta and at the 2000 Summer Olympics in Sydney. She completed the race on both occasions, but finished next to last in Atlanta, with a time of 3:25:16, and last in Sydney, with a time of 3:34:27. Ketavong completed the Sydney marathon "to a standing ovation from some fans".

== International competitions ==
Year	Competition	Venue	Position	Event	Notes
Representing Laos
1996	Olympic Games	Atlanta, United States	64th	Marathon	3:25:16
1998	Asian Games	Bangkok, Thailand	9th	Marathon	3:28:40
2000	Olympic Games	Sydney, Australia	45th	Marathon	3:34:27
2001	Jeux de la Francophonie	Ottawa, Canada	14th (h)	1500 m	5:00.97
2001	Southeast Asian Games	Kuala Lumpur, Malaysia	7th	5000 m	19:21.15
2001	Southeast Asian Games	Kuala Lumpur, Malaysia	–	10,000 m	DNF

== See also ==
- Laos at the 1996 Summer Olympics
- Laos at the 2000 Summer Olympics
