= Sysavath Thammavongchit =

Laotian long-distance runner

Personal information
- Nationality: Laotian
- Born: February 25, 1991 (age 35)

Sysavath Thammavongchit is a Laotian long-distance runner.

== Personal bests ==
- 5000m - 15:27.06 (Kuala Lumpur 2017)
- 10,000m - 33:02.86 (Singapore 2015)
- 3000m steeplechase - 9:37.41 (Singapore 2015)
