= Chaleunsouk Oudomphanh =

Laotian sprinter

Chaleunsouk Oudomphanh (born September 24, 1978) is a Laotian athlete specializing in the 100 metres. He is 5'9" and approximately 143 lbs.

Participating in the 2004 Summer Olympics, he achieved seventh place in his 100 metres heat with a time of 11.30, thus failing to secure qualification to the second round. Oudomphonh was also the flag bearer at the Opening Ceremony on August 13.
