= Dieter Aderhold =

German cathedratic and politician

- Born: 27 November 1939; Heru-Juu, Tanzania
- Died: 19 June 1989 (aged 49)
- Occupations: Cathedratic and politician
- Political party: Social Democratic Party of Germany

Dieter Aderhold (27 November 1939 – 19 June 1989) was a German cathedratic and politician. He was a member of the Landtag of North Rhine-Westphalia from 1966 to 1970 and from 1980 until his death in 1989.
