= Siri Arun Budcharern =

Laotian swimmer (born 2002)

Personal information
- Full name: Siri Arun Budcharern
- Nationality: Laos
- Born: January 12, 2002 (age 24) Vientiane, Laos

Sport
- Sport: Swimming
- Strokes: Freestyle

Siri Arun Budcharern (born 12 January 2002) is a freestyle swimmer from Laos. She competed at the 2016 Summer Olympics in the Women's 50 m freestyle and finished 76th with a time of 32.55 seconds. She did not advance to the semifinals, which required a top 16 finish in the heats.

Leading up to the Games, Budcharern trained in a 25 m public pool in Vientiane, half the length of an Olympic-sized venue. She had to share the pool with children taking swimming lessons while the pool deck was often covered with beer bottles from parties.
