= Thongdy Amnouayphone =

Laotian runner

Personal information
- Nationality: Laotian
- Born: 7 November 1976 (age 48)

Sport
- Sport: Sprinting
- Event: 100 metres

Thongdy Amnouayphone (born 7 November 1976) is a Laotian runner who competed at the 1996 Summer Olympics in the 4 × 100 metres relay, being placed 8th in his heat without advancing to the second round. He was the flag bearer of Laos during the 1996 Summer Olympics opening ceremony.
