= Souksavanh Tonsacktheva =

Laotian sprinter

Souksavanh Tonsacktheva (born August 12, 1988 in Vientiane) is a track and field sprint athlete who competes internationally for Laos.

Tonsacktheva represented Laos at the 2008 Summer Olympics in Beijing. He was also his country's flagbearer at the opening ceremony. He competed at the 100 metres sprint and placed 8th in his heat without advancing to the second round. He ran the distance in a time of 11.51 seconds.
