= Eay Simay =

Laotian Paralympic powerlifter

Personal information
- Nationality: (Laos) Laotian
- Born: 5 March 1981 (age 45)

Sport
- Sport: Powerlifting
Medal record
Representing Laos
Paralympic Games
Powerlifting
Bronze medal – third place	2008 Beijing	Men's 48kg

Eay Simay (born 5 March 1981) is a Laotian Paralympic powerlifter. In the 2008 Summer Paralympics he won the first Olympic or Paralympic medal for Laos when taking bronze in the Men's 48 kg.

== Career ==
Simay made his debut as one of the first two Laotian Paralympians at the 2000 Summer Paralympics. He competed in the Men's up to 48 kg and lifted 110 kg to finish 12th.

He didn't appear at the 2004 Summer Paralympics since Laos did not send a delegation. Simay returned at the 2008 Summer Paralympics, this time as the only Laotian competitor at the games, and Simay, greatly improving on his performance from 2000, won the country's first Paralympic medal, a bronze, by lifting 157.5 kg in the men's up to 48 kg category.

In the 2012 Summer Paralympics, he lifted 155 kg in the men's 48 kg and finished fourth just outside of a medal position.
