= Laenly Phoutthavong =

Laotian track and field athlete

Personal information
- Born: June 4, 1996 (age 29)
- Height: 1.69 m (5 ft 6 1/2 in)
- Weight: 55 kg (121 lb)

Sport
- Country: Laos
- Sport: Athletics
- Event: 100 metres

Laenly Phoutthavong (born 4 June 1996 in Vientiane) is a Laotian athlete competing in the long and triple jump. She competed at the 2012 Summer Olympics in the 100 metres event.

== Competition record ==
Year	Competition	Venue	Position	Event	Notes
Representing Laos
2012	Olympic Games	London, United Kingdom	22nd (pr)	100m	13.15 s
2013	Southeast Asian Games	Naypyidaw, Myanmar	8th	Long jump	5.41 m
2013	Southeast Asian Games	Naypyidaw, Myanmar	6th	Triple jump	12.18 m
2014	Asian Games	Incheon, South Korea	14th	Triple jump	12.26 m
2015	Southeast Asian Games	Singapore	9th	Long jump	5.57 m
2015	Southeast Asian Games	Singapore	6th	Triple jump	12.27 m
2016	Olympic Games	Rio de Janeiro, Brazil	16th (pr)	100 m	12.82 s
2017	Southeast Asian Games	Kuala Lumpur	9th	Long jump	5.75 m
2017	Southeast Asian Games	Kuala Lumpur	7th	Triple jump	12.36 m
