= Sitthixay Sacpraseuth =

Laotian sprinter

Sitthixay Sacpraseuth (Lao: ສິດທິໄຊ ສັກປະເສີດ; born 15 March 1959) is a former Laotian sprinter who participated in three Summer Olympics for Laos.

== Career ==
Sacpraseuth was seeded in the 9th 200 m heat at the 1980 Olympics. He ran 24.28 seconds to finish 7th and did not advance.

At the 1982 Asian Games, Sacpraseuth entered in both the 100 m and 200 m. He finished 6th in his 100 m heat and 5th in his 200 m heat and did not advance in both events.

In 1983, Sacpraseuth set his 100 m personal best of 11.37 seconds. He also set a 200 m best of 23.23 seconds.

Sacpraseuth was the Laos flag bearer at the 1988 Summer Olympics Parade of Nations. However, he did not compete as an athlete at the 1988 Games.

Sacpraseuth also competed in the 100 m at the 1992 Summer Olympics. Running in the 7th heat, he split 12.02 seconds to finish 8th and did not advance. He was the only man to run over 12 seconds in the 100 m.

== Personal life ==
Sacpraseuth became the Vice President-Secretary of the Lao Amateur Athletic Federation. He was also the head coach of the Lao national team. He organized the 2015 Laotian Athletics Championships to serve as a trials for selecting national team members.

He was in charge of training Lao athletes for athletics at the 2017 SEA Games. He hoped that Lao could win medals in the women's 100 metres hurdles, men's 110 metres hurdles, women's 1500 m, and women's 5000 m.

He organized the 2019 Vientiane International Half Marathon. He organized the event to improve the international reputation of Vientiane. He said the race was also used to encourage tourism following the COVID-19 pandemic in Laos.

He led the Lao national track and field team at the 2025 Singaporean Athletics Championships.
