= Kilakone Siphonexay =

Laotian runner

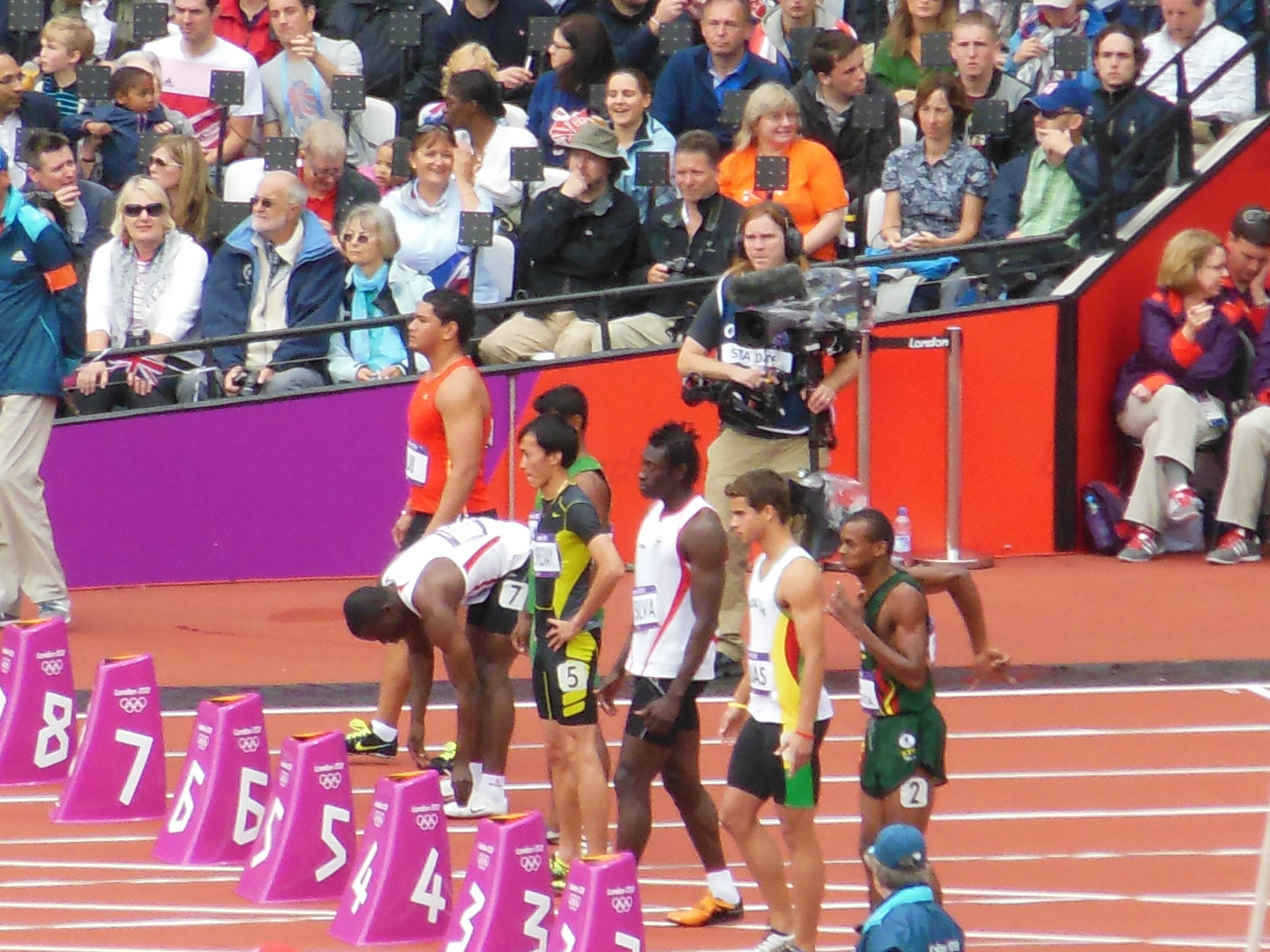
- Before the start of heat 1 of the 100 m at the 2012 Summer Olympics

Personal information
- Born: 2 June 1989 (age 37) Vientiane, Laos
- Height: 1.68 m (5 ft 6 in)
- Weight: 63 kg (139 lb)

Sport
- Country: Laos
- Sport: Athletics
- Event: 100 metres
- Updated on 5 August 2012

Kilakone Siphonexay (born 2 June 1989 in Vientiane, Laos) is a Laotian runner who competed at the 2012 Summer Olympics in the 100 m event. He was the flag bearer of Laos during the opening ceremony. He has been called "the fastest man in Laos".
