= Philaylack Sackpraseuth =

Laotian sprinter

Philaylack Sackpraseuth (born April 30, 1987) is a track and field sprint athlete who competes internationally for Laos.

Sackpraseuth represented Laos at the 2004 and 2008 Summer Olympics in Athens and Beijing. She competed at the 100 metres sprint on both occasions. In 2004 she ran the distance in a time of 13.42 seconds finishing 8th in her heat and not progressing through to the next round. In 2008, she ran the distance in 13.86 seconds this time finishing 9th in her heat and not progressing to the next round.

Sackpraseuth's personal best in the 100m is 13.42 seconds which she set at Athens during the 2004 Olympic Games. She then equalled this time in Berlin in 2009.
