= Silina Pha Aphay =

Laotian sprinter

Personal information
- National team: Laos
- Born: 29 March 1996 (age 30) Champasak, Laos

Sport
- Sport: 100m; 200m

Silina Pha Aphay (born 29 March 1996) is a sprinter from Laos. She was a flagbearer in the 2020 Summer Olympics Parade of Nations at the Tokyo Olympics.

== Biography ==
Pha Aphay was born on 29 March 1996 in Champasak. She studied English at Pakse Teacher Training College. She made her professional athletics debut in 2016 and at the South East Asian Games in 2017 she set a new national record for Laos. In 2018 she competed in the Asian Games in the 100m and 200m heats, and in 2019 in the Asian Championships in the 100m.

== Olympics 2020 ==
In 2021 Pha Aphay was selected to be one of the flag bearers in the 2020 Summer Olympics Parade of Nations at the Tokyo Olympics. She is one of four athletes sent by Laos to the competition: the other athletes are swimmers Silialoun Boutchaleun and Santisouk Inthavong, and judoka Souphaxay Sitthisan. Aphay is due to compete in the 100m event.
