= National Olympic Committee of Laos =

National Olympic Committee

- Country: Laos
- Code: LAO
- Created: 1975
- Recognized: 1979
- Continental Association: OCA
- President: Dr. Phouthone Seung-Akhom
- Secretary General: Mr Souvannarath Saignavong
- Website: www.olympiclao.org.la

The National Olympic Committee of Laos (Lao: ຄະນະກໍາມະໂອລິມປິກແຫ່ງຊາດຂອງສປປລາວ, IOC code: LAO) is the National Olympic Committee representing Laos.

== Presidents ==
Order	President	Term
1	Singkapo Sikhotchounamaly	?-1980
2	Siphon Phalikhon	1980-?
3	Singkapo Sikhotchounamaly	1982-?
4	Khampong Phanvongsa	?-1998
5	Phoutong Seng-Akhom	1998-?
6	Phankham Viphavanh	2011-2016
7	Sengdeuane Lachanthaboun	2016- 2022
8	Phout Simmalavong	2022-present
