= Deaths in June 1989 =

The following is a list of notable deaths in June 1989.

Entries for each day are listed alphabetically by surname. A typical entry lists information in the following sequence:

- Name, age, country of citizenship at birth, subsequent country of citizenship (if applicable), reason for notability, cause of death (if known), and reference.

== June 1989 ==
=== 1 ===
- Dharmasena Attygalle, 64, Sri Lankan politician.
- Niels Bertelsen, 63, Danish Olympic boxer (1952).
- Robert L. Chidlaw-Roberts, 93, Welsh WWI flying ace.
- Bernard Fauqueux, 50, French Olympic gymnast (1960, 1964).
- Emery Hawkins, 77, American animator.
- Aurelio Lampredi, 71, Italian automobile and aircraft engine designer.
- Alexis Lichine, 75, Russian wine writer and entrepreneur.
- Edward J. McShane, 85, American mathematician, congestive heart failure.
- Mark Petteway, 27, American basketball player.
- Charles Vanden Wouwer, 72, English-Belgian international footballer.
- Martin Zoborosky, 72, Canadian NHL player (Chicago Black Hawks).

=== 2 ===
- Guido Agosti, 87, Italian pianist and piano teacher.
- Smith Barrier, 72, American sports journalist.
- Ted à Beckett, 81, Australian test cricketer.
- Juan Inostroza, 46, Chilean Olympic fencer (1976).
- Dick Mayer, 64, American professional golfer.
- Frederic Prokosch, 83, American writer.
- Takeo Watanabe, 56, Japanese musician and composer.

=== 3 ===
- Shirley Burden, 80, American writer and photographer.
- Omer De Bruycker, 83, Belgian racing cyclist.
- Ayatollah Ruhollah Khomeini, 86 or 89, Iranian religious leader, Supreme Leader of Iran, heart attack.
- Frank Laming, 80, Scottish Anglican priest.
- Wynne Samuel, 77, Welsh politician.

=== 4 ===
- Dik Browne, 71, American cartoonist, cancer.
- Cecil Collins, 81, English painter and printmaker.
- Bernard Considine, 64, Australian rules footballer and cricketer.
- Vernon Cracknell, 77, New Zealand politician.
- Franca Helg, 69, Italian designer and architect.
- Charles Henry, 77, Canadian politician, member of the House of Commons of Canada (1949-1957).
- Thio Ging Hwie, 65, Indonesian Olympic weightlifter (1952).

=== 5 ===
- Ernie Barber, 75, American NFL player (Washington Redskins).
- Baby Huwae, 49, Dutch-Indonesian actress, model and singer.
- André Michel, 81, French film director and screenwriter.
- Fritz Nagy, 65, American basketball player.
- Maurice Philippe, 57, British aircraft and Formula One car designer.
- Barry Sullivan, 61, Canadian NHL player (Detroit Red Wings).

=== 6 ===
- Whitey Glazner, 95, American MLB player (Pittsburgh Pirates, Philadelphia Phillies).
- Richard P. Graves, 82, American director of the League of California Cities.
- Richard Kahn, Baron Kahn, 83, British economist.
- Michael O'Farrell, 40, American vice-president of Oakland Hells Angels Motorcycle Club, murdered.
- Ernest John Primeau, 79, American Roman Catholic bishop.
- Laxman Singh, 81, Indian last ruling Maharawal (Maharaja) of the state of Dungarpur.
- Bohumil Steigenhöfer, 84, Czech Olympic ice hockey player (1928).

=== 7 ===
- Evan Peter Aurand, 71, American naval officer.
- Donn Beach, 82, American adventurer, businessman and World War II veteran, liver cancer.
- Jorge Córdova, 76, Chilean international footballer.
- Jim Cristy, 76, American swimmer and Olympic medalist (1932, 1936), financial manager for the Updike Company.
- William McLean Hamilton, 70, Canadian politician.
- Chico Landi, 81, Brazilian Formula One racing driver.
- Nara Leão, 47, Brazilian singer, brain tumour.
- Paulo Leminski, 74, Brazilian writer, poet and journalist, liver cirrhosis.
- David Peregrine, 34, Canadian dancer and actor, plane crash.
- George Roughton, 79, English footballer.
- Jane Weiller, 77, American golfer.
- Notable Dutch-Surinamese football players killed in Surinam Airways Flight 764:
  - Ruud Degenaar, 25, Heracles Almelo
  - Lloyd Doesburg, 29, AFC Ajax
  - Steve van Dorpel, 23, FC Volendam
  - Wendel Fräser, 22, RBC Roosendaal
  - Frits Goodings, 25, FC Wageningen
  - Jerry Haatrecht, 28, Neerlandia
  - Virgall Joemankhan, 20, Cercle Brugge
  - Andro Knel, 21, NAC Breda
  - Ruben Kogeldans, 22, Willem II Tilburg
  - Fred Patrick, 23, PEC Zwolle
  - Andy Scharmin, 21, FC Twente
  - Nick Stienstra, 34, RC Heemstede
  - Elfried Veldman, 23, De Graafschap
  - Florian Vijent, 27, Telstar

=== 8 ===
- Bibb Falk, 90, American Major League baseball player.
- Glenn McQuillen, 74, American MLB player (St. Louis Browns).
- Erik Østrand, 71, Danish Olympic wrestler (1952).
- Albert Spaggiari, 56, French criminal.
- Emil Verban, 73, American Major League baseball player.
- Paul Zanolini, 90, American Olympic wrestler (1920).

=== 9 ===
- George Beadle, 85, American geneticist, Nobel laureate in Physiology or Medicine.
- Rashid Behbudov, 73, Azerbaijani singer and actor.
- Norman Brearley, 98, Australian commercial and military pilot, pioneer of Australian airline industry.
- James Horstead, 91, Anglican bishop of Sierra Leone and Archbishop of West Africa.
- Vladimir Kasatonov, 78, Soviet military leader and fleet admiral.
- Huang Yan, 76, Chinese politician.
- José López Rega, 72, Argentine politician, Minister of Social Welfare, diabetes.
- Wolfdietrich Schnurre, 68, German writer, heart failure.
- Bill Tymms, 85, Australian rules footballer.
- Piotr Vasiliev, 80, Soviet realist painter.

=== 10 ===
- Basil Gray, 84–85, English art historian, Islamicist and author, head of the British Museum's Oriental department.
- James Greenway, 86, American ornithologist.
- Martin Kottler, 79, American NFL footballer (Pittsburgh Pirates).
- Ortwin Linger, 21, Dutch-Surinamese football player (HFC Haarlem), injuries from plane crash.
- Juan Bustillo Oro, 85, Mexican film director, screenwriter and producer.
- Richard Quine, 68, American actor, director and singer, suicide by shooting.
- Suleyman Rustam, 83, Soviet poet, playwright and translator.
- John Ryan, 79, Australian rules footballer.
- Joe Stripp, 86, American Major League baseball player.

=== 11 ===
- Ronald Eric Bishop, 86, British engineer, chief designer of the de Havilland Mosquito.
- Arnulfo Briceño, 50, Colombian musician, songwriter and lawyer, plane crash.
- Lloyd Cheatham, 70, American football player (Chicago Cardinals, New York Yankees).
- Jan Lapidoth, 73, Swedish Olympic bobsledder (1952, 1956).
- Jack McMahon, 60, American NBA basketballer and coach.
- Charles Smith Rutherford, 97, Canadian soldier, last surviving WW1 VC recipient.
- Jim Williams, 60, American college football coach.

=== 12 ===
- Guy Crossman, 73, Canadian politician, member of the House of Commons of Canada (1962-1972).
- Eduardo Dualde, 55, Spanish hockey player and Olympic medalist (1960, 1964).
- Nilufer Hanımsultan, 73, Ottoman princess.
- Joe Knott, 82, Australian rules footballer.
- Lou Monte, 72, Italian-American singer.

=== 13 ===
- Fran Allison, 81, American television and radio personality, myelodysplasia.
- William Grasso, Italian-American mobster, murdered.
- Ray Sherry, 64, Australian politician, member of the Australian Parliament.
- Howard Simons, 60, American editor of Washington Post at time of the Watergate scandal, pancreatic cancer.

=== 14 ===
- Dame Zara Bate, 80, Australian fashion entrepreneur, wife of Australian Prime Minister Harold Holt.
- Louis-Philippe-Antoine Bélanger, 82, Canadian politician, member of the House of Commons of Canada (1962-1965).
- Pat Capri, 70, American MLB player (Boston Braves).
- Pete de Freitas, 27, English musician and producer, motorcycle accident.
- Wei Guoqing, 75, Chinese government official, military officer and political commissar.
- Heber Austin Ladner, 86, American politician, Secretary of State of Mississippi, heart disease.
- Joseph Malula, 71, Congolese archbishop and cardinal.
- Richard Moran, 56, American Olympic sprint canoeist (1956, 1960).
- Thomas A. Pope, 94, American soldier, WW1 Medal of Honor recipient.
- Yitzchok Yaakov Weiss, 87, Israeli rabbi, heart attack.
- Albert Wolff, 82, French-born American Olympic fencer (1948, 1952).

=== 15 ===
- Maurice Bellemare, 77, Canadian politician, diabetes.
- Roberto Camardiel, 71, Spanish theatre director and actor, bone disease.
- Victor French, 54, American actor and director, lung cancer.
- Judy Johnson, 89, American Negro League baseball player.
- Ray McAnally, 63, Irish actor, heart attack.
- Edmund Louis Palmieri, 82, American district judge (United States District Court for the Southern District of New York).
- Luis Ricceri, 88, Italian Roman Catholic priest.

=== 16 ===
- Miloslav Bednařík, 24, Czech Olympic sport shooter (1988).
- Helga Haase, 55, East German speed skater and Olympic gold medalist (1960, 1964).
- Arthur Häggblad, 80, Swedish Olympic cross-country skier (1936).
- William Colbert Keady, 76, American district judge (United States District Court for the Northern District of Mississippi).
- Celia Lynch, 81, Irish politician.
- Mino Maccari, 90, Italian painter.
- Jock McKenzie, 77, Australian rules footballer.
- Antonio Román, 77, Spanish film director, screenwriter and film producer.
- John Westbrook, 66, English actor.

=== 17 ===
- S. David Griggs, 49, United States Navy officer and NASA astronaut.
- John Matuszak, 38, American football player and actor, accidental overdose.
- Pat Parker, 45, American poet and activist, breast cancer.

=== 18 ===
- Ennio Balbo, 67, Italian film, television and voice actor.
- Paulo Cavalheiro, 55, Brazilian Olympic boxer (1952).
- Bobby Cross, 57, American NFL footballer.
- George C. Pimentel, 67, American chemist and researcher, intestinal cancer.
- Celestino Pinto, 57, Brazilian Olympic boxer (1952, 1956).
- Walter Ryan, 85, Canadian Olympic cross-country skier (1932).
- Steve Senteney, 33, American MLB player (Toronto Blue Jays).
- I. F. Stone, 81, American investigative journalist, writer and author, heart attack.

=== 19 ===
- Betti Alver, 82, Estonian poet.
- Yevgeny Kabanov, 70, Soviet Naval Aviation major general.
- Andrey Prokofyev, 30, Soviet sprinter and Olympic gold medalist (1980), suicide.

=== 20 ===
- Dona Drake, 74, American singer, dancer and film actress, pneumonia.
- Veikko Lommi, 71, Finnish Olympic rower (1948, 1952).
- Conway Olmstead, 81, American Olympic sailor (1928).
- José María Querejeta, 70, Spanish footballer
- Henri Rivière, 67, French Olympic bobsledder (1952).

=== 21 ===
- Ron Bailey, 75, Australian international rugby league footballer.
- Lee Calhoun, 56, American hurdler, dual Olympic gold medalist (1956, 1960).
- Vernon Grimshaw, 73, English cricketer.
- Aleksandr Safronov, 36, Soviet speed skater and Olympian (1976).
- Bjørn Skaare, 30, Norwegian NHL player (Detroit Red Wings).
- Edmond Sollberger, 68, Turkish-Swiss–British museum curator, scholar of the Sumerian language.

=== 22 ===
- Anton Dermota, 79, Slovene lyric tenor.
- William Fletcher-Vane, 80, British politician, member of the House of Lords.
- Robert Körner, 64, Austrian international footballer.
- Dick Moje, 62, American NFL player (Green Bay Packers).
- Henri Sauguet, 88, French composer.
- Isaac Starr, 94, American physician, heart disease specialist and clinical epidemiologist.
- Reynolds Webb, 89, Australian rules footballer.

=== 23 ===
- Michel Aflaq, 79, Syrian philosopher and Arab nationalist, complications from heart surgery.
- Rick Anderson, 35, American MLB player (New York Yankees, Seattle Mariners).
- Werner Best, 85, German Nazi Party leader, organiser of the SS-Einsatzgruppen paramilitary death squads.
- Timothy Manning, 79, Irish-American Roman Catholic archbishop.
- Arne Tuft, 78, Norwegian Olympic cross-country skier (1936).

=== 24 ===
- Geoffrey Cradock-Watson, 80, English cricketer and aviator.
- Svend Aage Eriksen, 80, Danish footballer.
- Russell Meiggs, 86, British ancient historian.
- Hibari Misora, 52, Japanese singer and actress.
- Ghulam Raziq, 56, Pakistani hurdler and Olympian (1956, 1960, 1964).
- Clarrie Tolson, 77, Australian rules footballer.
- Prince Vasili Alexandrovich of Russia, 81, Russian-American nephew of Tsar Nicholas II.

=== 25 ===
- Idris Cox, 89, Welsh communist activist and newspaper editor.
- M. A. Daniel, 35, Sri Lankan politician, murdered.
- Graham Hamilton, 49, Australian Olympic swimmer (1956).
- Hiram Meikle, 91, Jamaican cricketer.

=== 26 ===
- Howard Charles Green, 93, Canadian federal politician.
- Jack Kenny, 74, Australian rules footballer.
- Walter Ralston Martin, 60, American Baptist Christian minister and author.
- Frank Roberts, 77, Australian rules footballer.
- Inger Stender, 76, Danish actress of stage, film and television.
- Jack Tregoning, 70, Australian cricketer.

=== 27 ===
- Sir Alfred Ayer, 78, English philosopher.
- Fritz Bleiweiß, 77, German Olympic racewalker (1936).
- Jack Buetel, 73, American film and television actor.
- Dorothy Bullitt, 97, American businesswoman and philanthropist.
- János Kulcsár, 62, Hungarian Olympic sprint canoeist (1952).
- Michele Lupo, 56, Italian film director.
- Gregory McMahon, 74, American politician, member of the U.S. House of Representatives (1947-1949).
- Stevan Vilotić, 63, Yugoslav footballer and manager.

=== 28 ===
- Karl Bendetsen, 81, American politician and military officer, U.S. Under Secretary of the Army.
- Alan Duff, 51, English cricketer.
- Joris Ivens, 90, Dutch documentary filmmaker.
- Alfredo Sadel, 59, Venezuelan singer and actor.
- Mike Sebastian, 79, American NFL footballer.

=== 29 ===
- Keith Chapman, 43, American concert organist (Wanamaker Organ), plane crash.
- Kazuo Mori, 78, Japanese film director
- Oskar Nowak, 76, Austrian field and ice hockey player (1936, 1948 Winter, 1948 Summer).

=== 30 ===
- Hilmar Baunsgaard, 69, Danish politician, Prime Minister of Denmark.
- John Bloomfield, 87, Australian politician.
- Jim Dewar, 67, American footballer.
- George Perrett, 66, Australian rules footballer.
- Rostislav Plyatt, 80, Russian stage and film actor.
