= Sigi Lens =

Dutch footballer (born 1963)

Personal information
- Date of birth: 26 October 1963 (age 63)
- Place of birth: Paramaribo, Suriname
- Position: Forward

Senior career*
Years	Team	Apps	(Gls)
1985–1986	AZ		(17)
1986–1989	Fortuna Sittard		(28)
- * Club domestic league appearances and goals

Sigi Lens (born 26 October 1963) is a Surinamese former footballer and currently is a sports agent. A forward, he played for AZ and Fortuna Sittard. He was one of the footballers that survived the Surinam Airways Flight 764 air crash in Paramaribo on 7 June 1989. His nephew Jeremain Lens is also a professional footballer.

== Playing career ==
In his playing career, Lens was a tall, but quick forward who was able to play as a right winger or a striker. He made his professional debut at AZ in the 1985-86 season, when he featured in a team with players like Kees Kist and Pier Tol. Despite the appearance of these goalscoring players, he was the club's top goalscorer in the season, scoring a total of 17 goals. His efforts came out best in counterattacks as his pace could be used optimal.

Lens left AZ in 1986 and signed a new contract at Fortuna Sittard. In his three years at Fortuna Sittard, he became the club's top goalscorer in the 1986–87 and 1987-88 season. In the 1988-89 season, only John Clayton scored more goals. He had a great effort in the matches against Ajax, Feyenoord and PSV Eindhoven, who were all beaten at Fortuna's homeground De Baandert that season.

== Disaster ==
After that season, he was invited by Sonny Hasnoe, the founder of the Colourful 11 to be part of the team and travel to Suriname to play in the "Boxel Kleurrijk Tournament" with three Surinamese teams. The Surinam Airways Flight PY764 crashed during approach to Paramaribo-Zanderij International Airport, killing 176 of the 187 on board, making it the worst ever aviation disaster in Suriname's history. Among the dead were a total of 15 members of the Colourful 11, only three of them, including Lens survived. One of his best friends, Fred Patrick, with whom he played together at AZ, was among the deaths. Lens would never play professional football again due to a complicated pelvic fracture he suffered during the crash.

== After his career ==
After his career, Lens was appointed by the VVCS (Vereniging Voor Contract Spelers) [Association For Contract Players] and became one of their player's agents. He would work mostly with the black players, with whom he built up close relationships. The VVCS reasoned that a black agent would sooner gain the trust of the black players. After a few years, half way during the 1990s, he and colleague Peter Gerards were charged for a possible fraud. It was said they might have been earning money for transfers without the VVCS or the player in question knowing. As a result, both were fired by the VVCS, but as a result of the rumours a lot of the players at the VVCS left as well. The affair with Gerards and Lens in the main roles made it possible for commercial investors to start their own agencies. This was also due to the Bosman ruling of 1995 that made it easier for players to switch clubs.

Sigi Lens subsequently started his own agency named Pro Athlete. The relations between Lens and the players he worked with were so close that, when Lens started Pro Athlete, they immediately followed him, and most of them stayed with him until now or until they ended their careers. Other retired footballers and friends of Lens Paul Nortan and John Veldman were appointed as his partners. Several of the players Lens worked with and still works with are André Ooijer, Denny Landzaat, George Boateng, Giovanni van Bronckhorst, Mario Melchiot, Michael Reiziger and Winston Bogarde.
