= Frits Goodings =

Dutch footballer (1963–1989)

Personal information
- Date of birth: 10 October 1963
- Place of birth: Paramaribo, Suriname
- Date of death: 7 June 1989 (aged 25)
- Place of death: Paramaribo, Suriname

Youth career
- AFC Quick 1890
- Utrecht

Senior career*
Years	Team	Apps	(Gls)
1985–1989	Wageningen	43	(2)
- * Club domestic league appearances and goals

Frits Goodings (10 October 1963 – 7 June 1989) was a Dutch footballer who played for FC Utrecht and FC Wageningen. He died at the age of 25, when on 7 June 1989 he was killed in the Surinam Airways Flight 764 air crash in Paramaribo.

== Career ==
Goodings was born Paramaribo and raised in Amersfoort where he played for local amateur side Quick. He played in the youth teams of FC Utrecht alongside his friend, Edu Nandlal. His first professional contract was signed at FC Wageningen. Very injury-prone, Goodings played just over 40 games in 4 years at the club.

== Death ==
Both Goodings and Nandlal were invited by Sonny Hasnoe, the founder of the Colourful 11 to be part of the team travelling to Suriname to play in the "Boxel Kleurrijk Tournament" with three Surinamese teams. The Surinam Airways Flight PY764 crashed during approach to Paramaribo-Zanderij International Airport, killing 176 of the 187 on board, making it the worst ever aviation disaster in Suriname's history. Gooding was among the 15 members of the 18-man Colourful 11 contingent to be killed; only three of them survived, of which Edu Nandlal was one.

His father, Frits Goodings, Sr., only found his empty wallet in the woods around Paramaribo at the location of the crash. It was said the victims were robbed from their personal belongings just after the crash.
