= Florian Vijent =

Dutch-Surinamese footballer

Personal information
- Full name: Florian Vijent
- Date of birth: 28 November 1961
- Place of birth: Amsterdam, Netherlands
- Date of death: 7 June 1989 (aged 27)
- Place of death: Paramaribo, Suriname
- Position: Goalkeeper

Senior career*
Years	Team	Apps	(Gls)
????–1989	Telstar	?	(?)
- * Club domestic league appearances and goals

Florian Vijent (28 November 1961 – 7 June 1989), was a Dutch-Surinamese football goalkeeper. During his career he played for Telstar. He died at the age of 27, when on 7 June 1989, he was killed in the Surinam Airways Flight 764 air crash in Paramaribo. He is not related to Ed Vijent.

Vijent's large build was one of the reasons he became a goalkeeper. At the end of the 1988-89 season he was named as "Best goalkeeper of the season" in the Eerste Divisie. Vijent resembled AFC Ajax goalkeeper and close friend Stanley Menzo, who often borrowed Vijent's drivers license.

Together with Menzo and teammate Radjin de Haan he was invited by Sonny Hasnoe, the founder of the Colourful 11, to be part of the team and travel to Suriname to play in the "Boxel Kleurrijk Tournament" against three Surinamese teams. Although Menzo was instructed to not participate in the tournament by Ajax, he defied his club, booking an earlier flight to Suriname. On 7 June 1989, Surinam Airways Flight PY764 crashed during approach to Paramaribo-Zanderij International Airport, killing 176 of the 187 passengers on board, including Vijent, making it the worst ever aviation disaster in Suriname's history. Of the 18-member Colourful 11 team, only De Haan and two other team members survived the accident.

Vijent's younger brother Patrick was facing psychological problems even before Florian's death. His problems, however, merely worsened after Florian's death and only a few days after the accident he committed suicide by throwing himself in front of an oncoming train.
