= Degenaar =

Degenaar is a Dutch surname. Notable people with the surname include:

- Johan Degenaar (1926–2015), South African philosopher
- Rudy Degenaar (1963–1989), Suriname footballer
- Nathalie Degenaar (1980), Dutch astronomer/astrophysicist
