= Frank de Boer =

Dutch football manager (born 1970)

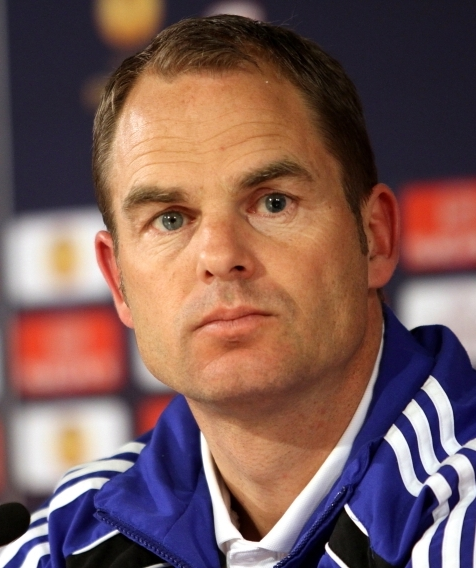
- De Boer as manager of Ajax in 2011

Personal information
- Full name: Franciscus de Boer
- Date of birth: 15 May 1970 (age 56)
- Place of birth: Hoorn, Netherlands
- Height: 1.79 m (5 ft 10 in)
- Positions: Centre-back; left-back

Youth career
- De Zouaven
- 1984–1988: Ajax

Senior career*
Years	Team	Apps	(Gls)
1988–1999	Ajax	328	(30)
1999–2003	Barcelona	144	(5)
2003–2004	Galatasaray	15	(1)
2004	Rangers	15	(2)
2004–2005	Al-Rayyan	16	(5)
2005–2006	Al-Shamal	1	(0)
Total		519	(43)

International career
1990–2004	Netherlands	112	(13)

Managerial career
- 2006–2010: Ajax (youth)
- 2010–2016: Ajax
- 2016: Inter Milan
- 2017: Crystal Palace
- 2018–2020: Atlanta United
- 2020–2021: Netherlands
- 2023: Al Jazira
Medal record
Men's football
Representing Netherlands
UEFA European Championship
Bronze medal – third place	1992 Sweden
Bronze medal – third place	2000 Belgium-Netherlands
Bronze medal – third place	2004 Portugal
- * Club domestic league appearances and goals

Franciscus de Boer (Dutch pronunciation: [ˈfrɑŋɡ də ˈbuːr]; (Note: Frank in isolation is pronounced [frɑŋk].) born 15 May 1970) is a Dutch former professional footballer and current manager. A former defender, De Boer spent most of his playing career with Ajax, winning five Eredivisie titles, two KNVB Cups, three Super Cups, one UEFA Super Cup, one UEFA Cup, one UEFA Champions League, and one Intercontinental Cup. He later spent five years at Barcelona, where he won the 1998–99 La Liga title, followed by short spells at Galatasaray, Rangers, Al-Rayyan and Al-Shamal before retiring.

De Boer is the third-most capped outfield player in the history of the Netherlands national team, with 112 caps. He captained Oranje to the semi-finals of both the 1998 FIFA World Cup and UEFA Euro 2000. He is the twin brother of Ronald de Boer, with whom he was a teammate at Ajax, Barcelona, Rangers, Al-Rayyan, Al-Shamal and the Netherlands national team.

After retiring from playing, De Boer went into management with the Ajax youth team and as assistant to Bert van Marwijk with the Netherlands national team. In December 2010, he took over as manager of Ajax and went on to win the Eredivisie title in his first season. In 2013, he received the Rinus Michels Award for manager of the year in the Netherlands after leading Ajax to their third successive Eredivisie title. The following year, he became the first manager to win four consecutive Eredivisie titles. He then had brief spells managing in Serie A with Inter Milan in 2016, Crystal Palace in the Premier League in 2017, and Atlanta United in MLS from 2018 to 2020. De Boer was appointed head coach of the Netherlands national team in September 2020, but left less than a year later in June 2021 after the team's disappointing Euro 2020 campaign.

== Club career ==
De Boer grew up in Grootebroek and started playing football with his brother Ronald at local club De Zouaven, where his father Kees was their coach.

=== Ajax ===
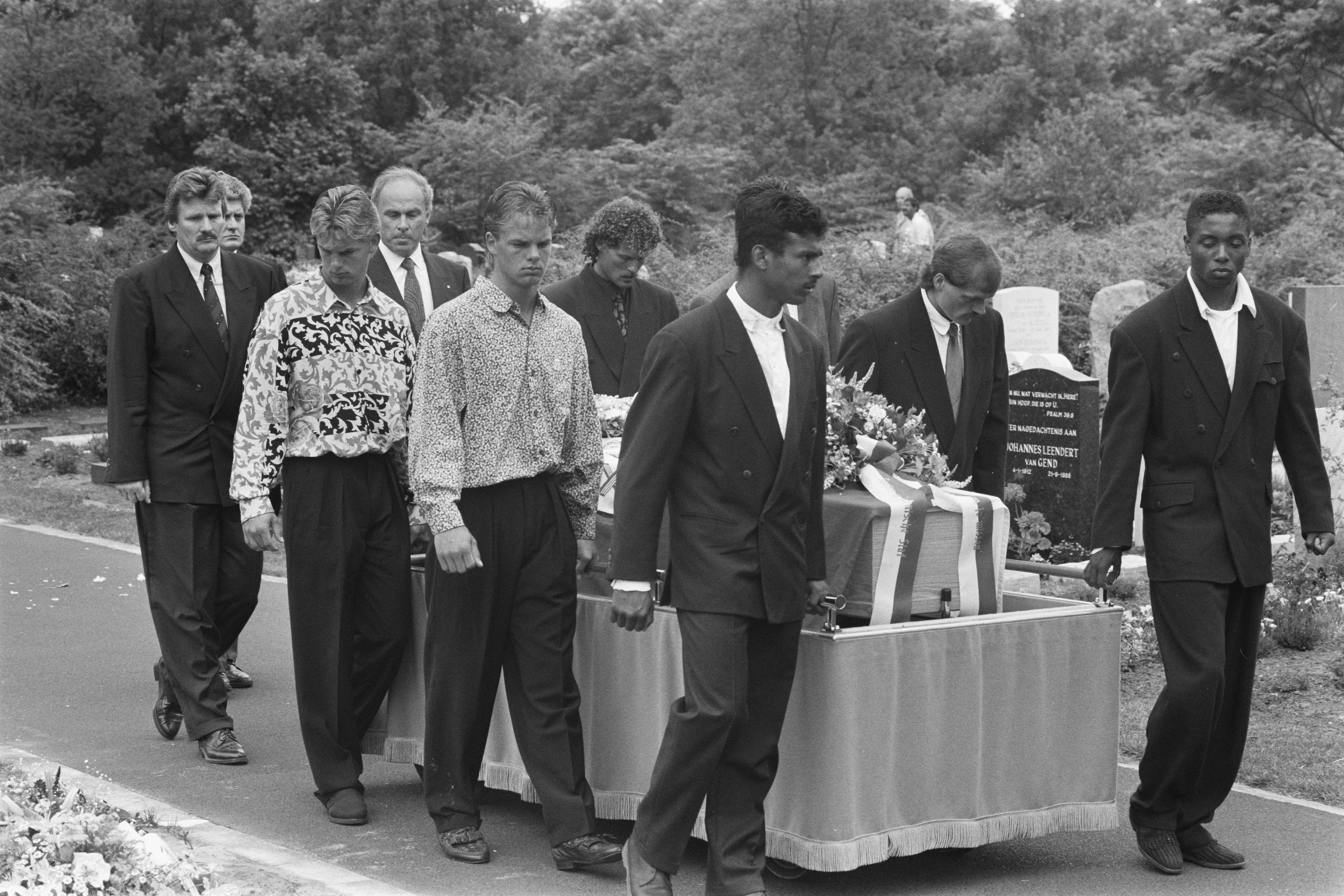
Both de Boer brothers were pallbearers for their Ajax teammate Lloyd Doesburg, who died aboard Surinam Airways Flight 764. Frank was second from left.

De Boer began his career as a left-back at Ajax before switching to centre-back, a position he made his own for many years in the national team. He won both the 1991–92 UEFA Cup and 1994–95 UEFA Champions League while at Ajax, in addition to five Eredivisie titles and two KNVB Cups. However, after signing a six-year contract extension with Ajax for the 1998–99 season, he and his twin brother Ronald took successful legal action to have it voided. Ajax had a verbal agreement that if a lucrative offer for one brother came by, he would be released provided the other stayed. Ajax, however, apparently backed down on that agreement after floating the club on the stock market and pledging to shareholders that it would hold both of the De Boers and build around them a team to recapture the Champions League.

=== Barcelona ===
In January 1999, Frank and Ronald de Boer signed for Spanish La Liga club Barcelona for £22 million, joining their former Ajax manager Louis van Gaal at the Camp Nou. After winning the 1998–99 La Liga title, they were unable to repeat their earlier triumphs. In 2000, Van Gaal was sacked by Barcelona and Frank suffered the ignominy of testing positive for the banned substance nandrolone a year later. He was suspended but he was reinstated after a successful appeal.

=== Later career ===
De Boer briefly moved to Galatasaray in the summer of 2003 before joining his brother at Rangers in January 2004. He made his Rangers debut in a 1–0 win away at Partick Thistle, but in his second appearance for the club he missed the decisive penalty in the shootout as Rangers lost to Hibernian in the Scottish League Cup semi-final. He made a total of 17 appearances for Rangers, scoring two goals against Aberdeen and Dundee. The De Boer brothers left Rangers after UEFA Euro 2004 to play the rest of their football careers in Qatar with Al-Rayyan. De Boer announced his retirement from football in April 2006.

== International career ==
Having represented his national team 112 times, he was the most capped player in the history of the Netherlands national team, until Edwin van der Sar surpassed him. De Boer made his debut for the Netherlands in September 1990 against Italy.

De Boer also played for the Netherlands in the 1994 and 1998 FIFA World Cups, and the 1992, 2000 and 2004 UEFA European Championships; he missed UEFA Euro 1996 due to an injury. He is well-remembered for the arching 60-yard pass which allowed Dennis Bergkamp to score the last-minute goal that eliminated Argentina in the quarter-finals of the 1998 World Cup. During Euro 2000, hosted in his home country and Belgium, De Boer reached another semi-final with the Dutch team. De Boer missed an important penalty kick in the first half of the semi-finals against 10-man Italy and another in the penalty shootout, which led to the Netherlands' elimination from the tournament.

On 29 March 2003, in a home match against Czech Republic, De Boer became the first Dutch male footballer to gain 100 caps. He ended his international career after an injury forced him to be replaced in a quarter-final match with Sweden at Euro 2004. The injury ruled him out from the semi-final match against Portugal, which the Netherlands lost 2–1.

== Style of play ==
A left-footed defender, De Boer's technical attributes included ball distribution from the defensive line, long-range passing, and set-piece taking, specifically free kicks. While noted for a lack of pace, his style of play relied on anticipation and positional awareness. Versatile in defensive roles, he played as a left-back, center-back, and sweeper.

== Managerial career ==
In 2007, De Boer took up a coaching role at his former club Ajax where he was in charge of the club's youth sector. During the 2010 World Cup, he was the assistant of the Netherlands national football team to manager Bert van Marwijk, together with retired player Phillip Cocu. The Dutch team reached the final of the tournament, losing to Spain.

=== Ajax ===
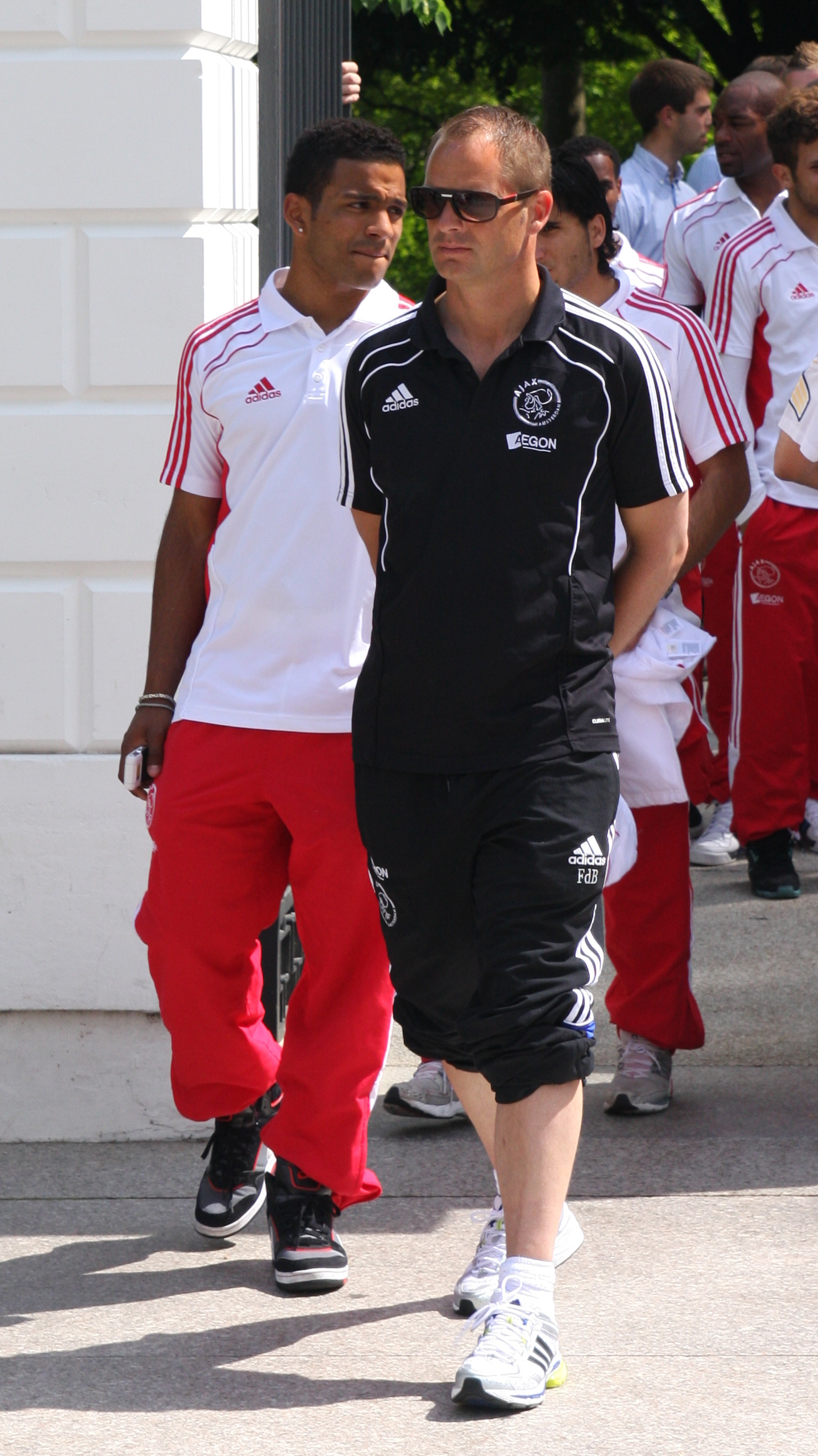
De Boer with Ajax in 2011

On 6 December 2010, after the resignation of Martin Jol, De Boer was appointed caretaker manager of Ajax until the winter break. His first game in charge was a Champions League match against Milan at the San Siro, a match Ajax won 2–0 through goals from Demy de Zeeuw and Toby Alderweireld. De Boer then went on to help Ajax become champions of the Eredivisie for the 2010–11 season in a 3–1 home victory over Twente, the champions of the previous year, on the final matchday, making the first year of his professional coaching career a golden one. "I couldn't have wished for a more beautiful birthday present", said De Boer, as the club's 30th championship was won on his 41st birthday.

In two-and-a-half years at the helm of Ajax, De Boer won three championships, making eight in total (when including the five that he won as a player). According to reports, De Boer was offered the chance to interview for the Liverpool job but turned it down to remain with Ajax. "I am honoured by the request [from Liverpool] but I have only just started with Ajax", he said. In 2013, De Boer received the Rinus Michels Award for manager of the year in the Netherlands after leading Ajax to their third successive Eredivisie title.

On 27 April 2014, De Boer won his fourth successive Eredivisie title with Ajax, the first manager ever to achieve this in the Dutch league. Moreover, it marked the first time Ajax has ever won four successive Eredivisie titles. De Boer has now won a total of nine Eredivisie championships with Ajax as a player and manager, another record; Johan Cruyff, Sjaak Swart and Jack Reynolds all won eight Eredivisie championships with Ajax. Ajax finished the 2014–15 Eredivisie in second position, a massive 17 points behind champions PSV.

On 11 May 2016, De Boer announced his resignation as manager of Ajax following a disappointing season when Ajax again lost out on the Eredivisie title to PSV on the final matchday of the season.

=== Inter Milan ===
On 9 August 2016, after the departure of Roberto Mancini, De Boer signed a three-year contract with Inter Milan for the start of the 2016–17 season. De Boer's first match in charge was Inter's final pre-season friendly, a 2–0 win against Celtic on 13 August, played on neutral ground at Thomond Park, Republic of Ireland.

The club management board also approved expensive signings João Mário and Gabriel Barbosa for the team and De Boer (they were in fact linked to Mancini and Inter in July), and the return to Turkey of recent acquisition Caner Erkin in the last days of transfer window. Barbosa, however, was rarely used in Serie A matches and could not be registered in European competitions due to a penalty imposed on Inter for breaching UEFA Financial Fair Play Regulations in previous seasons.

De Boer's first competitive match was a 2–0 away loss to Chievo on 21 August. After the match, De Boer was criticized for using a three-man defence, a style that he had never used while at Ajax. Milan-based newspaper Corriere della Sera went as far as calling Inter's performance a "disaster". Fortunes soon turned, however, as Inter drew 1–1 against Palermo on 28 August, before winning three games in a row, against Pescara, title-holders Juventus and Empoli. The win against Juventus was highly praised, with De Boer being lauded for substituting Éder for Ivan Perišić, who provided the winning goal. Inter's form would not last long, as the club would go on to lose against Roma, Cagliari and Atalanta.

Inter also struggled in the UEFA Europa League under De Boer, as they lost the opening match 0–2 at home against Israeli team Hapoel Be'er Sheva on 15 September, and 3–1 against Sparta Prague on 29 September. Inter would then go on to finish last in their group with a total of six points, with three points under De Boer and another three under his successor.

Following a run of four defeats in the last five Serie A matches, which left Inter in 12th place in Serie A, De Boer was sacked on 1 November, having been in charge for only 85 days. His last match was a 1–0 loss to Sampdoria on 30 October. Ironically, during a press interview in the annual general meeting of the shareholders of Internazionale on 28 October, CEO Michael Bolingbroke had confirmed that the club was 100% backing De Boer. (Bolingbroke himself resigned a few days later. Liu Jun, vice-president of sister company Suning Sports, replaced Bolingbroke.)

De Boer argued that he "needed more time" in order to make a mark as manager at Inter, and thanked his fans on his Twitter profile for the support. He was replaced by former Lazio manager Stefano Pioli on 8 November, the ninth manager Inter had appointed since winning the Treble in 2010 under José Mourinho. Following Pioli's initial struggles at Inter, De Boer hit back at the lack of leadership following Suning's takeover of Inter, which he credits for the lack of trust he was given while there.

=== Crystal Palace ===
On 26 June 2017, De Boer was announced as the new manager of Premier League side Crystal Palace, replacing Sam Allardyce. He signed a three-year deal with the South London club, but was dismissed ten weeks later when Palace lost their first four league matches of the season without scoring a single goal – the first team in 93 years to have begun a top-flight season in such a fashion. He left having managed the team for only 450 minutes of game time, making it the shortest reign of the Premier League era (in terms of number of matches, rather than number of days). De Boer's only win came in an EFL Cup second-round game, in which Crystal Palace won 2–1 against Ipswich Town. He was replaced by Roy Hodgson.

Whilst at the club, De Boer attempted to implement a possession-based style of play; after his dismissal, he criticised the club's players for their resistance to his approach, arguing that the club had signed only two players to fit his philosophy. Palace winger Wilfried Zaha commented on De Boer's brief time at the club, stating "There wasn't really the right mixture [of players] for the way we wanted to play."

Referencing De Boer's stint at Crystal Palace, José Mourinho described De Boer as "the worst manager in the history of the Premier League".

=== Atlanta United ===
On 23 December 2018, De Boer was announced as the head coach of Major League Soccer side Atlanta United, succeeding Gerardo "Tata" Martino to become the second head coach in the club's history. In his first season, the team won both the U.S. Open Cup and Campeones Cup, while in MLS action finishing second in the Eastern Conference and reaching the Eastern Conference final.

On 24 July 2020, following Atlanta's elimination from the MLS is Back Tournament after losing all three of their matches, Atlanta and De Boer mutually agreed to part ways.

=== Netherlands ===
On 23 September 2020, the KNVB announced that De Boer would be the new manager of the country's national football team, replacing Ronald Koeman who had left to join Barcelona. On 11 November 2020, after a 1–1 draw with Spain, De Boer became the first ever Netherlands manager to fail to win any of his first four fixtures.

He managed the Netherlands at UEFA Euro 2020, where despite topping their group, they ultimately lost 2–0 to Czech Republic in the round of 16 and were eliminated. As a result of the team's poor Euros performance, on 29 June 2021, the KNVB announced that it had parted ways with De Boer.

=== Al Jazira ===
On 5 June 2023, De Boer was appointed head coach of UAE Pro League club Al Jazira, signing a two-year contract to succeed his compatriot Marcel Keizer. On 11 December 2023, with the club sitting in 7th place in the league table and following a 4–2 defeat to Al Wahda in the quarter-finals of the UAE League Cup, De Boer was dismissed.

== Career statistics ==
=== Player ===
Club	Season	League			Cup		League Cup		Continental		Other		Total	
Club	Season	Division	Apps	Goals	Apps	Goals	Apps	Goals	Apps	Goals	Apps	Goals	Apps	Goals
Ajax	1988–89	Eredivisie	27	0	2	0	–				–		29	0
Ajax	1989–90	Eredivisie	25	0	3	0	–		1	0	–		29	0
Ajax	1990–91	Eredivisie	34	1	2	0	–				–		36	1
Ajax	1991–92	Eredivisie	30	1	3	0	–		12	0	–		45	1
Ajax	1992–93	Eredivisie	34	3	5	1	–		8	1	–		47	3
Ajax	1993–94	Eredivisie	34	1	4	2	–		6	1	1	1	45	5
Ajax	1994–95	Eredivisie	34	9	3	0	–		10	2	1	0	48	11
Ajax	1995–96	Eredivisie	32	3	2	0	–		9	1	1	1	44	5
Ajax	1996–97	Eredivisie	32	4	0	0	–		9	0	1	0	42	4
Ajax	1997–98	Eredivisie	31	5	5	2	–		8	2	–		44	9
Ajax	1998–99	Eredivisie	15	3	1	0	–		6	0	–		22	3
Ajax	Total		328	30	30	5	0	0	69	7	4	2	431	44
Barcelona	1998–99	La Liga	19	2	4	2	–				–		23	4
Barcelona	1999–2000	La Liga	22	0	7	0	–		12	2	2	0	43	2
Barcelona	2000–01	La Liga	34	3	7	1	–		11	1	–		52	5
Barcelona	2001–02	La Liga	34	0	0	0	–		13	0	–		47	0
Barcelona	2002–03	La Liga	35	0	1	0	–		14	3	–		50	3
Barcelona	Total		144	5	19	3	0	0	50	6	2	0	215	14
Galatasaray	2003–04	Süper Lig	15	1	0	0	0	0	6	0	–		21	1
Rangers	2003–04	Scottish Premier League	15	2	1	0	1	0			–		17	2
Al-Rayyan	2004–05	Qatar Stars League	16	5							–		16	5
Al-Shamal	2005–06	Qatar Stars League	1	0							–		1	0
Career total			519	43	50	8	1	0	125	13	6	2	701	66

=== International ===
Appearances by national team and year

National team	Year	Apps	Goals
Netherlands	1990	3	0
Netherlands	1991	2	1
Netherlands	1992	7	0
Netherlands	1993	7	0
Netherlands	1994	14	0
Netherlands	1995	6	0
Netherlands	1996	5	1
Netherlands	1997	6	3
Netherlands	1998	15	1
Netherlands	1999	7	0
Netherlands	2000	13	4
Netherlands	2001	6	1
Netherlands	2002	7	1
Netherlands	2003	10	1
Netherlands	2004	4	0
Total		112	13

International goals

(Source)

Scores and results list Netherlands' goal tally first.

Goal	Date	Venue	Opponent	Score	Result	Competition
1.	5 June 1991	Helsingin olympiastadion, Helsinki, Finland	Finland	1–0	1–1	UEFA Euro 1992 qualifying
2.	9 November 1996	Philips Stadion, Eindhoven, Netherlands	Wales	4–1	7–1	1998 FIFA World Cup qualification
3.	29 March 1997	Amsterdam Arena, Amsterdam, Netherlands	San Marino	2–0	4–0	1998 FIFA World Cup qualification
4.	29 March 1997	Amsterdam Arena, Amsterdam, Netherlands	San Marino	4–0	4–0	1998 FIFA World Cup qualification
5.	30 April 1997	Stadio Olimpico, Serravalle, San Marino	San Marino	4–0	6–0	1998 FIFA World Cup qualification
6.	1 June 1998	Philips Stadion, Eindhoven, Netherlands	Paraguay	4–1	5–1	Friendly
7.	4 June 2000	Stade Olympique de la Pontaise, Lausanne, Switzerland	Poland	1–0	3–1	Friendly
8.	11 June 2000	Amsterdam Arena, Amsterdam, Netherlands	Czech Republic	1–0	1–0	UEFA Euro 2000
9.	21 June 2000	Amsterdam Arena, Amsterdam, Netherlands	France	2–2	3–2	UEFA Euro 2000
10.	15 November 2000	Estadio Olímpico, Seville, Spain	Spain	2–1	2–1	Friendly
11.	2 June 2001	Lilleküla staadion, Tallinn, Estonia	Estonia	1–0	4–2	2002 FIFA World Cup qualification
12.	27 March 2002	Stadion Feijenoord, Rotterdam, Netherlands	Spain	1–0	1–0	Friendly
13.	19 November 2003	Amsterdam Arena, Amsterdam, Netherlands	Scotland	5–0	6–0	UEFA Euro 2004 qualifying

== Managerial statistics ==
As of match played 11 December 2023

Managerial record by team and tenure
Team	Nat	From	To	Record							
Team	Nat	From	To	G	W	D	L	GF	GA	GD	Win %
Ajax	(Netherlands)	6 December 2010	11 May 2016	263	158	58	47	557	263	+294	60.08
Inter Milan	(Italy)	9 August 2016	1 November 2016	14	5	2	7	15	19	−4	35.71
Crystal Palace	(England)	26 June 2017	11 September 2017	5	1	0	4	2	8	−6	20.00
Atlanta United	(United States)	23 December 2018	24 July 2020	55	31	5	19	91	66	+25	56.36
Netherlands	(Netherlands)	23 September 2020	29 June 2021	15	8	4	3	31	15	+16	53.33
Al Jazira	(United Arab Emirates)	5 June 2023	11 December 2023	14	5	4	5	29	28	+1	35.71
Total				366	208	73	85	725	399	+326	56.83

== Honours ==
=== Player ===
Ajax

- Eredivisie (5): 1989–90, 1993–94, 1994–95, 1995–96, 1997–98
- KNVB Cup (2): 1992–93, 1997–98
- Johan Cruijff Shield (3): 1993, 1994, 1995
- UEFA Champions League: 1994–95
- UEFA Cup: 1991–92
- UEFA Super Cup: 1995
- Intercontinental Cup: 1995

Barcelona

- La Liga: 1998–99

Al Rayyan

- Emir of Qatar Cup: 2005

Netherlands

- FIFA World Cup fourth place: 1998

Individual

- ESM Team of the Year: 1995–96
- FIFA World Cup All-Star Team: 1998
- UEFA Euro Team of the Tournament: 2000
- Golden Foot: 2016, as football legend

=== Manager ===
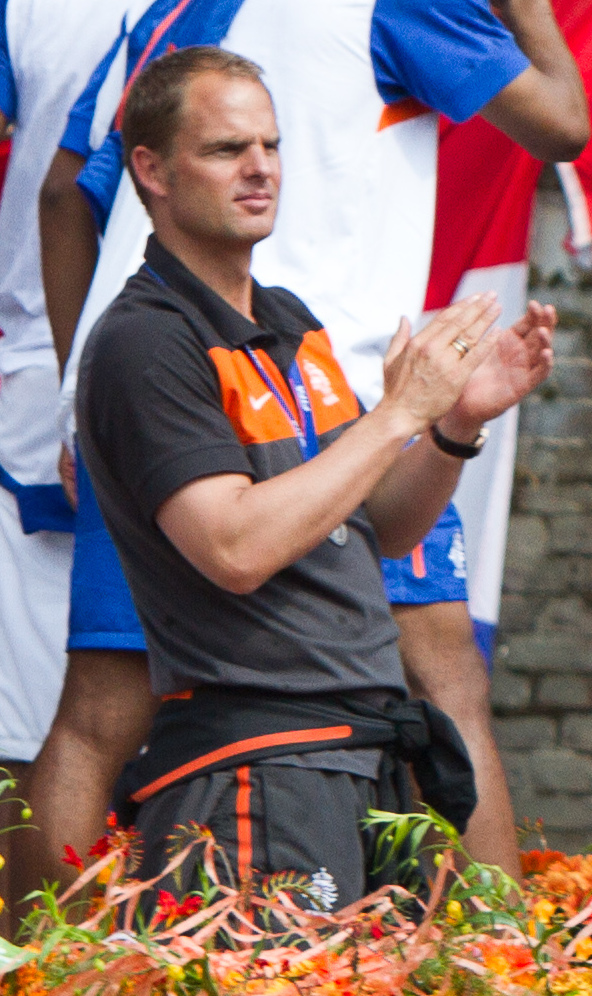
De Boer was assistant manager for the Dutch at the 2010 World Cup.

Ajax

- Eredivisie (4): 2010–11, 2011–12, 2012–13, 2013–14
- Johan Cruyff Shield: 2013

Atlanta United

- Campeones Cup: 2019
- U.S. Open Cup: 2019

Individual

- Amsterdamse coach van het jaar (De Fanny) (2): 2012, 2014
- Rinus Michels Award (2): 2013, 2014
- JFK's Greatest Man Award: 2013

== See also ==
- List of European association football families
- List of men's footballers with 100 or more international caps
