= Jerry Haatrecht =

Dutch-Surinamese footballer (1960–1989)

Personal information
- Full name: Jerry George Haatrecht
- Date of birth: 22 September 1960
- Place of birth: Paramaribo, Suriname
- Date of death: 7 June 1989 (aged 28)
- Place of death: Paramaribo, Suriname

Youth career
- Ajax

Senior career*
| Years | Team | Apps | (Gls) |
| 1985 | DRC Durgerdam | | |
| 1985–1986 | Cambuur | 18 | (0) |
| 1986–1987 | Rood Wit A | | |
| 1987 | VVGA | | |
| 1987 | Neerlandia '31 | | |
| 1988 | VVGA | | |
| 1988 | Neerlandia '31 | | |
| 1989 | Sloterplas | | |
- * Club domestic league appearances and goals

Jerry Haatrecht (22 September 1960, Paramaribo – 7 June 1989, Paramaribo) was a Dutch footballer. During his career he served Cambuur Leeuwarden as well as a bunch of amateur clubs including VV Neerlandia '31. He died at the age of 28, when on 7 June 1989 he was killed in the Surinam Airways Flight 764 air crash in Paramaribo. He was the brother of fellow professional footballer Winnie Haatrecht.

== Career ==
Both Jerry and Winnie Haatrecht often played at the Balboa Square in Amsterdam with Ruud Gullit and Frank Rijkaard. All four joined the AFC Ajax youth squad, playing alongside players such as Wim Kieft, Marco van Basten, Gerald Vanenburg, Sonny Silooy and John Bosman.

Jerry and Winnie were not able to get a professional contract at Ajax and both left the club for a club in other regions of the Netherlands. Winnie signed for Willem II Tilburg, while Jerry moved to Cambuur Leeuwarden. Jerry was not successful in professional football, and decided to move to the amateur divisions and served several teams (DRC Durgerdam and Rood Wit A) before joining VV Neerlandia '31. Before the start of the 1989-90 season he switched to yet another amateur team, when he signed a new contract for FC Sloterplas.

Brother Winnie, at that time playing for SC Heerenveen was invited by Sonny Hasnoe, the founder of the Colourful 11 to be part of the team and travel to Suriname to play in the "Boxel Kleurrijk Tournament" with three Surinamese teams. However Winnie withdrew from the squad close to the deadline and as a result Jerry was asked to join the team instead of Winnie, which he immediately accepted. The Surinam Airways Flight PY764 crashed during approach to Paramaribo-Zanderij International Airport, killing 176 of the 187 on board, including Haatrecht, making it the worst ever aviation disaster in Suriname's history. Among the dead were a total of 15 members of the Colourful 11, only three of them survived. The crash and the appearance of both Gullit and Rijkaard at his funeral made Jerry Haatrecht a well known footballer worldwide.

Winnie Haatrecht was shocked by the disaster and his brother's death. He decided it was better to move from all the media attention and signed a contract in the Swiss second division.

== Personal life ==
Jerry was born in Paramaribo, the son of Elfriede Augusta Simons and Ewald Ronald Haatrecht.
