= Nick Stienstra =

Dutch-Surinamese footballer (1954–1989)

Personal information
- Date of birth: 24 December 1954
- Date of death: 7 June 1989 (aged 34)
- Place of death: Paramaribo, Suriname

Senior career*
Years	Team	Apps	(Gls)
- SV Robinhood
- * Club domestic league appearances and goals

Nick Stienstra (24 December 1954 – 7 June 1989) was a Dutch-Surinamese footballer and coach. During his playing career he played for SV Robinhood. He was killed at the age of 34 in the Surinam Airways Flight 764 air crash in Paramaribo on 7 June 1989.

== Career ==
In his playing career Stienstra played at SV Robinhood before he moved to the Netherlands, where he was unable to sign on with a professional football club. Instead, he became determined to become a successful coach and started taking courses to become a football coach. In the meantime he was already coaching amateur side RCH from Heemstede. One of his ambitions was to return to Suriname to professionally develop Surinamese football.

He was appointed by Sonny Hasnoe, the founder of the Colourful 11, to coach the team in Suriname for the "Boxel Kleurrijk Tournament" against three Surinamese teams. The Surinam Airways Flight PY764 crashed during approach to Paramaribo-Zanderij International Airport, killing 176 of the 187 passengers on board, including Stienstra, making it the worst aviation disaster in Suriname's history. Of the 18 members of the Colourful 11, there were only three survivors. Stienstra was the only victim of the crash to be buried in Suriname.
