= Ruben Kogeldans =

Dutch footballer (1967–1989)

Personal information
- Date of birth: 4 January 1967
- Place of birth: Venlo, Netherlands
- Date of death: 7 June 1989 (aged 22)
- Place of death: Paramaribo, Suriname
- Position: Defender

Senior career*
Years	Team	Apps	(Gls)
- VVV-Venlo
–1989	Willem II	8	(0)
- * Club domestic league appearances and goals

Ruben Kogeldans (4 January 1967 – 7 June 1989) was a Dutch footballer who played as a defender. During his career he served VVV-Venlo and Willem II Tilburg. He died at the age of 22, when on 7 June 1989 he was killed in the Surinam Airways Flight 764 air crash in Paramaribo. His father, Leo was also a footballer and played for the Suriname national team. One of his passions off the pitch were the drums.

Kogeldans was born in Venlo. With his father as his idol he was determined to succeed as a professional footballer. He was talented and was able to sign his first professional contract with VVV-Venlo. Media and fans were not convinced of his qualities and he received a lot of criticism from the media, but every time he was able to response with his feet. He was a strong defender with a lot of professional discipline in both the matches as on the training pitch. Among the Willem II fans he was a popular player and his status was still growing.

Kogeldans left VVV-Venlo and moved to Willem II Tilburg. Here he was no key player, but was occasionally used in their line-ups in which he performed well and again was able to response on criticism with his efforts on the pitch. He was invited by Sonny Hasnoe, the founder of the Colourful 11 to be part of the team and travel to Suriname to play in the "Boxel Kleurrijk Tournament" with three Surinamese teams. The Surinam Airways Flight PY764 crashed during approach to Paramaribo-Zanderij International Airport, killing 176 of the 187 on board, including Kogeldans, making it the worst ever aviation disaster in Suriname's history. Among the dead were a total of 15 members of the Colourful 11, only three of them survived.

Ruben's parents still are in a process against the Surinam Airways. Due to the mistakes made at the company they were not satisfied with the fact that they blamed the crew for their mistakes that caused the disaster.
