= Elfried Veldman =

Dutch-Surinamese footballer

Personal information
- Full name: Elfried Romeo Veldman
- Date of birth: 5 June 1966
- Date of death: 7 June 1989 (aged 23)
- Place of death: Paramaribo, Suriname
- Positions: Right winger; striker

Youth career
- AFC Ajax

Senior career*
Years	Team	Apps	(Gls)
1988–1989	De Graafschap	27	(0)
- * Club domestic league appearances and goals

Elfried Romeo Veldman (5 June 1966 – 7 June 1989) was a Dutch footballer who played as a forward. During his career he served De Graafschap. He died two days after his 23rd birthday, when on 7 June 1989 he was killed in the Surinam Airways Flight 764 air crash in Paramaribo. He was the older brother of retired footballer and Dutch International John Veldman.

Veldman played in the youth squads of AFC Ajax as a right winger and was praised for his pace. Unfortunately for him he was unable to sign a professional contract at the club because of his lack in technique. He made the switch to De Graafschap, where he made his professional debut and played 27 matches.

He was invited by Sonny Hasnoe, the founder of the Colourful 11 to be part of the team and travel to Suriname to play in the "Boxel Kleurrijk Tournament" with three Surinamese teams. The Surinam Airways Flight PY764 crashed during approach to Paramaribo-Zanderij International Airport, killing 176 of the 187 on board, including Veldman, making it the worst ever aviation disaster in Suriname's history. Among the dead were a total of 15 members of the Colourful 11, only three of them survived.
