= Ed Vijent =

Dutch footballer (1963–2001)

Ed Vyent

Personal information
- Full name: Eddy Vijent
- Date of birth: 3 March 1963
- Place of birth: Amsterdam, Netherlands
- Date of death: 22 October 2001 (aged 38)
- Place of death: Amsterdam, Netherlands
- Position: Midfielder

Senior career*
Years	Team	Apps	(Gls)
????–????	AZ '67		
1984–1988	FC Volendam	26	(4)
1990–1991	Telstar	14	(0)
- * Club domestic league appearances and goals

Eddy "Ed" Vyent (3 March 1963 – 22 October 2001) was a Dutch footballer.

During his career he served AZ '67, FC Volendam and Telstar. He died at the age of 38, when on 22 October 2001 he was killed by a neighbour after some arguments about parked scooters. He was nicknamed "Eddy Love" and he is not related to Florian Vijent.

== Club career ==
Vijent who was a lefty was able to play in either the defence, the midfield or the attack, but was mainly used as a midfielder. He made his professional debut at AZ but made a move towards FC Volendam. With this team he promoted in 1987 from the Eerste Divisie to the Eredivisie, the highest level in Dutch football. He ended his career after playing a few seasons for Telstar.

After his career Vijent lived in Amsterdam and played some football for amateur side De Germaan.

== Death ==
On 22 October 2001 Vyent was killed by a neighbour who lived a few homes away. The cause was a long term discussion about a parking spot in front of the house of the suspect. The spot used to be filled up with the car of their disabled father, but after the divorce of their parents his sons used it to park their scooters. When a truck driver wanted to park his truck at the spot Vijent decided to move the scooters, causing a fight with the brothers. Two police officers came in between, but later the suspects came back to Vijent to threaten him. When he opened the door Vijent was stabbed to death.
