= Wendel Fräser =

Surinamese footballer

Personal information
- Full name: Wendel Fräser
- Date of birth: 2 June 1967
- Place of birth: Paramaribo, Suriname
- Date of death: 7 June 1989 (aged 22)
- Place of death: Paramaribo, Suriname
- Position: Forward

Youth career
- –1987: Spartaan '20

Senior career*
Years	Team	Apps	(Gls)
1987–1988	Feyenoord	0	(0)
1988–1989	RBC	29	(6)
1989	SVV	0	(0)
- * Club domestic league appearances and goals

Wendel Fräser (2 June 1967 in Paramaribo – 7 June 1989 in Paramaribo) was a Dutch footballer. He suited up for Feyenoord Rotterdam and RBC Roosendaal in his brief career, cut short when on 7 June 1989 he was killed in the Surinam Airways Flight 764 air crash in Paramaribo, at the age of 22.

Fräser was a postman in Rotterdam and played in the youth squads of Feyenoord Rotterdam. Although he was known as a talented player and was promoted to the first team of Feyenoord in the 1987–88 season, he was an unused substitute on the bench. The next season, he was transferred to RBC Roosendaal where he made his professional debut. After that season he signed a new contract at SVV for whom he would have been playing from the 1989–90 season.

He was invited by Sonny Hasnoe, the founder of the Colourful 11 to be part of the team and travel to Suriname to play in the "Boxel Kleurrijk Tournament" with three Surinamese teams. The Surinam Airways Flight PY764 crashed during approach to Paramaribo-Zanderij International Airport, killing 176 of the 187 on board, including Fräser, making it the worst ever aviation disaster in Suriname's history. Among those killed were a total of 15 members of the Colourful 11, leaving three survivors from that contingent.

In memoriam of Fräser the "Wendel Man of the Match Trophy" is given to RBC's best player of the season every year. The supporters home at the RBC Stadion is also named after Fräser.
