= Lloyd Doesburg =

Surinamese footballer (1960–1989)

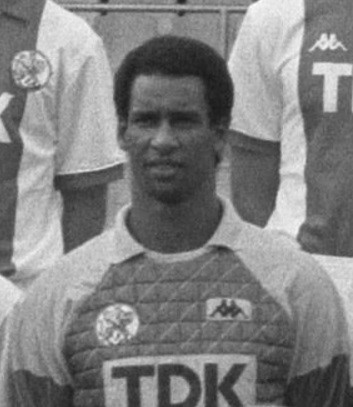
- Doesburg in 1988

Personal information
- Date of birth: 29 April 1960
- Place of birth: Suriname
- Date of death: 7 June 1989 (aged 29)
- Place of death: Paramaribo, Suriname
- Position: Goalkeeper

Youth career
- 1979–1981: Elinkwijk

Senior career*
Years	Team	Apps	(Gls)
1981–1986	Vitesse	149	(0)
1986–1987	Excelsior	30	(0)
1987–1989	Ajax	4	(0)
Total		183	(0)
- * Club domestic league appearances and goals

Lloyd Doesburg (29 April 1960 – 7 June 1989) was a Surinamese footballer who played as a goalkeeper. During his career he served Elinkwijk, Vitesse, Excelsior Rotterdam and Ajax. He died at the age of 29, when on 7 June 1989 he was killed in the Surinam Airways Flight 764 air crash in Paramaribo.

== Club career ==
Doesburg lived in Lelystad and played his first football matches for amateur side Elinkwijk where he stayed until 1981. After this he became a professional when he was transferred to Vitesse where he played a total of five seasons before joining Excelsior. From August 1987 he was purchased by Ajax to become their second goalkeeper behind Stanley Menzo after Fred Grim left the club. In total he would play five matches in the first team of Ajax.

== Personal life and death ==
Doesburg was married to Sylvia and he had two daughters and son with her.

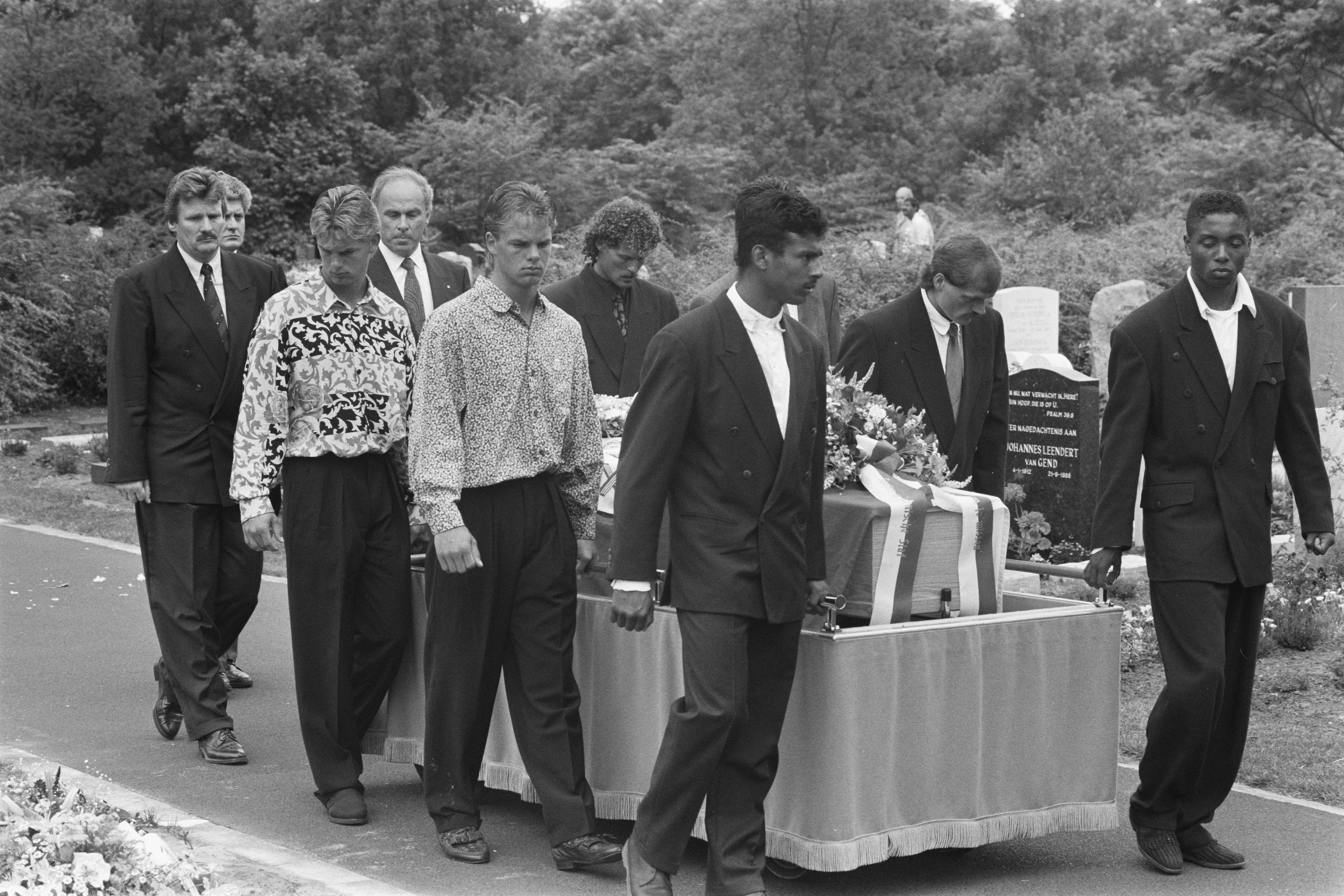
Doesburg's funeral procession with his teammates.

He was invited by Sonny Hasnoe, the founder of the Colourful 11 to be part of the team and travel to Suriname to play in the "Boxel Kleurrijk Tournament" with three Surinamese teams. Team mates Stanley Menzo and Henny Meijer were told to stay with their club, but ignored these demands and went as well, but both took an earlier flight. The Surinam Airways Flight PY764 crashed during approach to Paramaribo-Zanderij International Airport, killing 176 of the 187 on board, including Doesburg, making it the worst ever aviation disaster in Suriname's history. Among the dead were a total of 15 members of the Colourful 11, only three of them survived.

Doesburg's funeral was on 22 June 1989 and the complete Ajax squad of these days were present, including Menzo, Meijer, Jan Wouters, Aron Winter, Danny Blind, Bryan Roy, Dennis Bergkamp, Frank de Boer and Ronald de Boer who carried the coffin.
