= Radjin de Haan =

Dutch footballer and manager

Personal information
- Date of birth: 12 August 1969 (age 57)
- Position: Winger

Youth career
- Geel Wit '20

Senior career*
Years	Team	Apps	(Gls)
1988-1991	Telstar	48	(0)
1991–1993	Lisse		
1993–1996	Eindhoven	42	(2)
1994	→ Den Bosch (loan)	9	(0)
Total		99	(2)

Managerial career
- 2005–2007: RCH
- * Club domestic league appearances and goals

Radjin de Haan (born 12 August 1969) is a Dutch retired footballer and currently is a football manager. During his career he served Telstar, FC Eindhoven and FC Den Bosch. He was one of the footballers that survived the Surinam Airways Flight 764 air crash in Paramaribo on 7 June 1989. He was the only player to return on the pitch after the disaster.

== Playing career ==
De Haan played as a youth footballer for Geel Wit '20. He was known as a talented player and started his professional career at Telstar where he made his debut. He was the youngest footballer (18) to be invited by Sonny Hasnoe, the founder of the Colourful 11 to be part of the team and travel to Suriname to play in the "Boxel Kleurrijk Tournament" with three Surinamese teams.

=== SLM air disaster ===
The Surinam Airways Flight PY764 crashed during approach to Paramaribo-Zanderij International Airport, killing 176 of the 187 on board, making it the worst ever aviation disaster in Suriname's history. Among the dead were a total of 15 members of the Colourful 11, only three of them, including De Haan survived. After the crash De Haan saw dead bodies all around him. He managed to grab a little kid and brought himself and the kid in safety, while having a fractured vertebra.

Despite the broken vertebra he was able to return on the football pitches seven months after the disaster, making him the only player who survived the crash to make a comeback. Unfortunately for him he was unable to get his old form back and was forced to withdraw from professional football. He played for several amateur sides like FC Lisse, Holland (from Utrecht), RCH and Koninklijke HFC. He later got another chance in professional football and was signed by FC Eindhoven. Later he would also move to FC Den Bosch, but in both occasions his injury prevented him from any outstanding performances.

== Post-playing career ==
After his career he became an amateur football manager and led the Koninklijke HFC to position eleven of the "Sunday 1A class" in the 2002-03 season, his first season as a manager. He managed the Koninklijke HFC for another two years, but moved to Geel Wit '20 in between (2004–05). He then moved to VV Young Boys, playing in the "Saturday 4E class" and became league champions in the 2005-06 season, resulting in promotion. A year later when the team played in the "Saturday 3C class" they would become champions again and were promoted to the second class for the 2007-08 season. At the end of the 2007–08 season they became champions again and promoted to the first class for the 2008–09 season. In summer 2012 he left FC Castricum to take up a role as an academy coach at Al Ahli in Libya. He also was a coach at amateur sides Alcmaria Victrix and Amstelveen Heemraad and was named head coach of SV Zandvoort ahead of the 2026–27 season.

De Haan was released from prison in January 2022 after he was arrested for a drug related crime. In 2023, De Haan was convicted for drugs possession and trade, and sentenced to five years in prison.
