= Ortwin Linger =

Dutch footballer (1967–1989)

Personal information
- Date of birth: 17 September 1967
- Place of birth: Paramaribo, Suriname
- Date of death: 10 June 1989 (aged 21)
- Place of death: Paramaribo, Suriname
- Position: Right back

Youth career
- Abcoude
- –1982: JOS Watergraafsmeer
- 1982–????: HFC Haarlem

Senior career*
Years	Team	Apps	(Gls)
????–1989	HFC Haarlem	?	(?)
- * Club domestic league appearances and goals

Ortwin Linger (17 September 1967 – 10 June 1989) was a Dutch footballer. During his career he played for HFC Haarlem. He was a passenger on Surinam Airways Flight 764 when it crashed in Paramaribo on 7 June 1989. He died three days later, at 21 years of age, due to injuries suffered in the crash. He went to the same high school as Steve van Dorpel, who also died in the crash.

Linger was born in Paramaribo, but grew up in Amsterdam, in the Bijlmer area. He started his football career at amateur side FC Abcoude and later at JOS Watergraafsmeer where he would play until he was 16 years old. His next step up to a professional career was joining the youth squads of HFC Haarlem. His dream came true after he was promoted into the first-team squad and he made his professional debut.

He was invited by Colourful 11 founder Sonny Hasnoe to be part of the team travelling to Suriname to play in the "Boxel Kleurrijk Tournament" against three Surinamese teams. His friend, AFC Ajax goalkeeper Stanley Menzo, was also called up, but was told to stay with his club. Menzo, however, ignored this edict and went as well, taking an earlier flight.

On 7 June 1989 Surinam Airways Flight PY764 crashed during approach to Paramaribo-Zanderij International Airport, killing 176 of the 187 passengers on board, making it the worst ever aviation disaster in Suriname's history. Among those killed were 15 members of the 18-member Colourful 11 contingent.

Linger initially survived the crash, but could barely be identified at the hospital. On 10 June 1989, three days after the accident, Linger died of his injuries. His identity was later confirmed by his uncle and Stanley Menzo, who recognized his leg muscles and his jaw line. In the following days Linger's relatives were supported by Dick Advocaat, who was his manager at HFC Haarlem and who had a close friendship with his mother.
