= Fred Patrick =

Dutch–Surinamese footballer (1965–1989)

Personal information
- Full name: Frederik Arnold Patrick
- Date of birth: 25 July 1965
- Place of birth: Paramaribo, Suriname
- Date of death: 7 June 1989 (aged 23)
- Place of death: Paramaribo, Suriname
- Height: 1.79 m (5 ft 10 in)
- Position: Attacking midfielder

Senior career*
Years	Team	Apps	(Gls)
–1987	AZ Alkmaar		
1987–1989	PEC Zwolle		
- * Club domestic league appearances and goals

Frederik Arnold ("Fred") Patrick (25 July 1965 – 7 June 1989) was a Dutch footballer. During his career he served AZ Alkmaar and PEC Zwolle. Patrick was born in Paramaribo, where he died at the age of 23, when on 7 June 1989 he was killed in the Surinam Airways Flight 764 air crash. He was nicknamed "Stevie" for his well-known imitations of Stevie Wonder.

Patrick made his professional debut at AZ Alkmaar where he was part of the Surinamese trio existing of Patrick, Paul Nortan and Sigi Lens. In 1987, he decided to make a switch and signed for PEC Zwolle. This turned out to be no successful move as they were battling against relegation the whole season long. Eventually, on the last matchday in a match against FC Den Bosch they were officially relegated from the Eredivisie to the Eerste Divisie.

He was invited by Sonny Hasnoe, the founder of the Colourful 11 to be part of the team and travel to Suriname to play in the "Boxel Kleurrijk Tournament" with three Surinamese teams. The Surinam Airways Flight PY764 crashed during approach to Paramaribo-Zanderij International Airport, killing 176 of the 187 on board, including Patrick, making it the worst ever aviation disaster in Suriname's history. Among the victims were a total of 15 members of the Colourful 11, only three of them survived.

The east stand of the new IJsseldelta Stadion was named after Fred Patrick in 2007. The other stands were named after Henk Timmer, Klaas Drost and Marten Eibrink.
