= Steve van Dorpel =

Dutch footballer (1965–1989)

Personal information
- Full name: Steven van Dorpel
- Date of birth: 13 December 1965
- Place of birth: Amsterdam, Netherlands
- Date of death: 7 June 1989 (aged 23)
- Place of death: Paramaribo, Suriname
- Height: 1.85 m (6 ft 1 in)
- Position: Forward

Youth career
- SV Bijlmer

Senior career*
Years	Team	Apps	(Gls)
1986–1989	FC Volendam	72	(24)
1988	→ DS'79 (loan)	8	(1)
- * Club domestic league appearances and goals as of 5 December 2020

Steven ("Steve") van Dorpel (13 December 1965 in Amsterdam – 7 June 1989 in Paramaribo) was a Dutch footballer. During his career he played for FC Volendam.

He died at the age of 23, killed in the Surinam Airways Flight 764 air crash in Paramaribo on 7 June 1989. He was nicknamed "De parel van de Bijlmer" (The pearl of the Bijlmer), named after the Bijlmer district in Amsterdam where he lived and started playing football at SV Bijlmer. He was the nephew of fellow professional footballers Kevin Bobson and Etiënne Esajas and went to the same high school as Ortwin Linger, who also died in the crash.

== Club career ==
His main skills were his strength and his pace. He joined FC Volendam in 1987 and was one of the most promising talents in the Eredivisie. He scored a backheel goal against FC Den Bosch; this highlight would continuously be replayed by NOS Studio Sport. Against Ajax he ran through a defence that included Danny Blind and Aron Winter to score another memorable goal against Stanley Menzo. His achievements attracted serious interest from teams such as Feyenoord, Twente and Roda JC. Although FC Volendam did not want to let him go, he was close to signing a contract with Roda JC for the 1989–1990 season.

== Surinam Airways plane crash ==
He was invited by Colourful 11 founder Sonny Hasnoe to be part of the team travelling to Suriname to play in the "Boxel Kleurrijk Tournament" against three Surinamese teams. His friends André and Steve Wasiman were also invited but could not make the trip as their team, Excelsior, needed them in their quest for promotion to the Eredivisie. Two of his other friends, Stanley Menzo and Henny Meijer of Ajax, were also instructed to not go, but Menzo and Meijer defied their club and went, both taking an earlier flight.

On 7 June 1989 Surinam Airways Flight PY764 crashed during approach to Paramaribo-Zanderij International Airport, killing 176 of the 187 passengers on board, including Van Dorpel, making it the worst ever aviation disaster in Suriname's history. Only three members of the 18-member Colourful 11 contingent survived the crash.

Van Dorpel had never seen his father and was about to change his last name into his mother's name, "Esajas". He had planned to meet his father for the first time in his life in Suriname during the Colourful 11 trip.

In memory of Van Dorpel, a statue was erected behind the "Amsterdamse Poort" police station. A hall in FC Volendam's Kras Stadion is also named after him and in 2010 a street in Amsterdam was named after him as well.

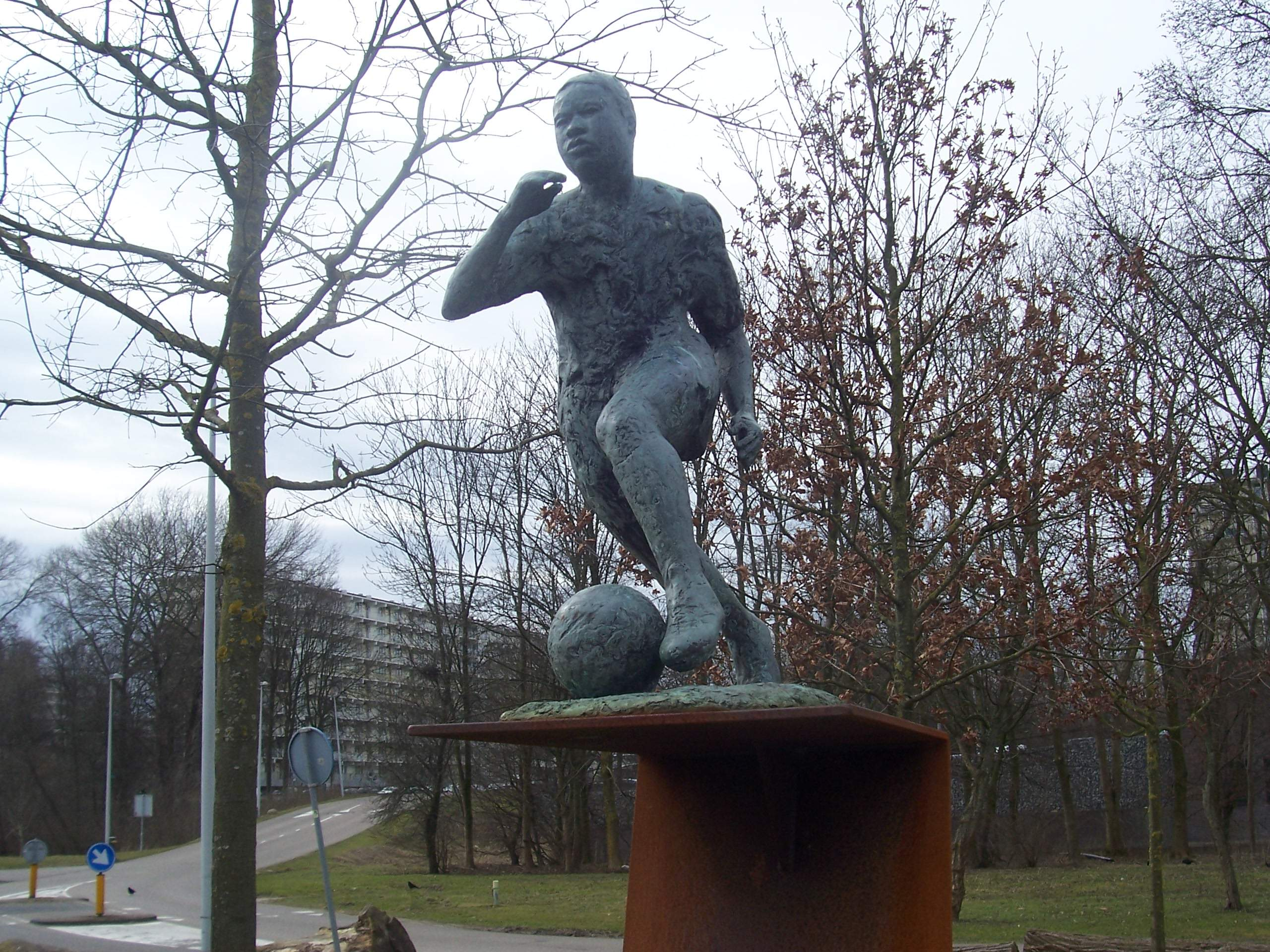
Statue of Van Dorpel in Bijlmerpark
