= Virgall Joemmankhan =

Dutch-Surinamese footballer (1968–1989)

Personal information
- Date of birth: 17 November 1968
- Place of birth: Amsterdam, Netherlands
- Date of death: 7 June 1989 (aged 20)
- Place of death: Paramaribo, Suriname

Youth career
- ZRC/Herenmarkt
- Ajax

Senior career*
Years	Team	Apps	(Gls)
?–1987	Ajax	0	(0)
1987–1989	Cercle Brugge	1	(0)
- * Club domestic league appearances and goals

Virgall Sinclair Joemmankhan (17 November 1968 – 7 June 1989) was a Dutch footballer. During his career, he played for AFC Ajax and Cercle Brugge. He died at the age of 20, when on 7 June 1989, he was killed in the Surinam Airways Flight 764 air crash in Paramaribo.

== Career ==
At Ajax, although he reached the A1 squad, Joemankhan and Dennis Bergkamp were both relegated to the A2 squad due to unprofessional conduct. While Bergkamp fought hard to improve his behaviour and his skills, Joemmankhan chose to leave Ajax and play for Cercle Brugge in Belgium.

Although Joemmankhan made his professional debut at Cercle Brugge, his reputation for partying continued. Along with his friend, Tom Krommendijk, a Feyenoord player on loan at Cercle with a similar reputation, they were often found together enjoying the nightlife in Bruges and Amsterdam.

He was invited by Colourful 11 founder Sonny Hasnoe to be part of the team travelling to Suriname to play in the "Boxel Kleurrijk Tournament" against three Surinamese teams. On 7 June 1989 Surinam Airways Flight PY764 crashed during approach to Paramaribo-Zanderij International Airport, killing 176 of the 187 passengers on board, including Joemmankhan, making it the worst ever aviation disaster in Suriname's history. Among those killed were 15 members of the 18-member Colourful 11 contingent.

Tom Krommendijk returned to Feyenoord for the 1989–90 season, but was sent on loan to FC Twente for the following season. He never played for Twente: on 25 August 1990 he was killed when his car collided with a tree, over a year after Joemmankhan's death.
