= John Veldman =

Dutch footballer

Personal information
- Full name: John Fitzgerald Veldman
- Date of birth: 24 February 1968 (age 58)
- Place of birth: Paramaribo, Suriname
- Height: 1.84 m (6 ft 0 in)
- Position: Defender

Senior career*
Years	Team	Apps	(Gls)
1986–1989	PSV	11	(0)
1989–1991	Willem II	59	(0)
1991–1996	Sparta Rotterdam	152	(0)
1996–1997	Ajax	17	(0)
1997–2000	Vitesse	44	(0)
2000–2001	RBC Roosendaal	14	(0)
Total		297	(0)

International career
1996	Netherlands	1	(0)
- * Club domestic league appearances and goals

John Fitzgerald Veldman (born 24 February 1968) is a Dutch former professional footballer who played as a defender. Veldman spent his entire career in the Eredivisie, playing 297 matches from 1986 to 2001. He began his professional career at PSV Eindhoven, then moved on to Willem II, Sparta Rotterdam, Ajax, Vitesse and RBC Roosendaal. While at Sparta, he started in various defensive positions and helped the club reach the final of the KNVB Cup in 1996.

Veldman earned a single cap for the Netherlands national team, which came on 24 April 1996 in a 1–0 loss to Germany. He was included in the Dutch squad for Euro 1996 but did not make an appearance.

His brother, Elfried Veldman, died in the crash of Surinam Airways Flight 764.
