= Andro Knel =

Dutch footballer

Personal information
- Full name: Andro Charles Willem Knel
- Date of birth: 8 October 1967
- Place of birth: Rotterdam, Netherlands
- Date of death: 7 June 1989 (aged 21)
- Place of death: Paramaribo, Suriname
- Position: Attacking midfielder

Youth career
- HMSH, DWO, ADO and FC Den Haag

Senior career*
Years	Team	Apps	(Gls)
1986–1989	Sparta Rotterdam	44	(1)
1989–1989	NAC Breda	19	(1)
- * Club domestic league appearances and goals

Andro Charles Willem Knel (8 October 1967 – 7 June 1989) was a Dutch footballer. During his career he served Sparta Rotterdam and NAC Breda. He died at the age of 21, when on 7 June 1989 he was killed in the Surinam Airways Flight 764 air crash in Paramaribo.

Born in Rotterdam, Knel moved from Rotterdam to The Hague (Den Haag) with his family when he was 10 years old. He played in the youth squads of HMSH, DWO, ADO and FC Den Haag before making the switch back to Rotterdam when he moved to Sparta Rotterdam. He made his professional debut in the 1986–87 season, aged 19.

He loved Jamaican reggae and his dreadlocks combined with his position of attacking midfielder made many people compare him with Ruud Gullit who also had dreadlocks in those days. Bob Marley and Peter Tosh were his main artists. Knel became loved at Het Kasteel. There were various cheer banners with rasta colours, messages and other signs featuring Knel. He had no driver's license and made his way to training by tram or by roller skates. In total he played 44 professional matches for Sparta in which he scored one goal.

In the winter break of the 1988–89 season NAC Breda manager Hans Verèl brought Knel to NAC for whom the club paid 185,000 guilders (about €84,000). Also at NAC he soon became a fan favourite. Not just with his performances on the pitch, but also with personality off the pitch.

He was invited by Sonny Hasnoe, the founder of the Colourful 11 to be part of the team and travel to Suriname to play in the "Boxel Kleurrijk Tournament" with three Surinamese teams. The Surinam Airways Flight PY764 crashed during approach to Paramaribo-Zanderij International Airport, killing 176 of the 187 on board, including Knel, making it the worst ever aviation disaster in Suriname's history. Among the dead were a total of 15 members of the Colourful 11, only three of them survived.

Hundreds of fans of both NAC Breda and Sparta Rotterdam came together in memorial of Knel. A temporary Knel monument was revealed and the numbers of supporters visiting the monument proved his popularity. Due to the sad moments of Knel's death a special relationship between fans of both teams was created. Ten years after the disaster both clubs released a combined edition of their fanzine in memorial of Knel. The fans also introduced the Andro Knel Trophy, which is held every time the clubs play each other competitively in the Dutch leagues. Prior to the match the fans play against each other to decide which team wins that year's Andro Knel Trophy.
