= George R. Hutchinson =

American aviator and media personality

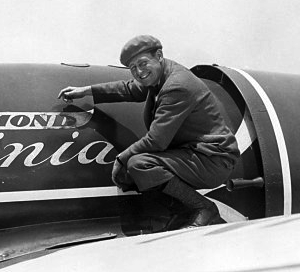
George R Hutchinson with the Richmond, Virginia, July 1930.

George R. Hutchinson (February 11, 1902 - August 21, 1989) was an American aviator and media personality of the 1930s.

== Early career ==
George Hutchinson was working as a bank teller in Baltimore, Maryland when he married Blanche Delcher (1902 - October 24, 1995) in 1922. In 1928 he co-financed William Penn Airport (later Boulevard Airport, closed in 1951) near Philadelphia, where he gave flying lessons and joyflights.

In 1930, Hutchinson bought a Lockheed Sirius monoplane he named Richmond, Virginia after his home town, trading in his smaller Stinson Junior as part of the purchase. He intended to use the Sirius, a sleek single-seat aircraft, to cross the Atlantic Ocean in a faster time than Charles Lindbergh had in 1927. However, before he could begin his attempt, he crashed the aircraft in Los Angeles. The Richmond, Virginia was sold to recover debts and was eventually to be rebuilt as the Altair Lady Southern Cross.

== The Flying Hutchinsons ==
The 'Flying Family', circa 1932.

In 1931, George, Blanche and daughters Kathryn and Janet Hutchinson (1925 - ) became nationwide celebrities as the Flying Hutchinsons, when they visited the capitals of all 48 United States by air. Further fame came when 'the Flying Family' attempted an around-the-world flight the next year; their Sikorsky S-38 aircraft crash-landed off Greenland, and the family were stranded for several days before being picked up by a fishing trawler and transported to the United Kingdom. George and Blanche wrote two books about their adventures - The Flying Family in Greenland (1935) and Flying the States (1937) - and the family were pictured on cereal boxes and made appearances on stage and radio.

In 1939, the family attempted another around-the-world flight in a Lockheed Electra. The stated aim of this flight was to carry a scroll with a message of peace to the '68 nations of the world' (sic), but this flight only made it as far as Mexico before it was cancelled due to the outbreak of World War II. Despite the early cancellation of the flight, an NBC radio dramatisation was subsequently produced, starring the family themselves.

== Later life ==
During World War II, at the age of 18, Janet Hutchinson became a WASP and flight instructor.

After the war, the family settled into relative obscurity in Ruxton, Maryland. After George's death in 1989, Blanche and her daughters retired to Ponte Vedra Beach, Florida.
