= Jack Tregoning =

Australian cricketer

Personal information
- Born: 13 June 1919; Adelaide, Australia
- Died: 26 June 1989 (aged 70)
- Source: Cricinfo, 28 September 2020

Jack Tregoning (13 June 1919 – 26 June 1989) was an Australian cricketer. He played in two first-class matches for South Australia between 1939 and 1948.

== See also ==
- List of South Australian representative cricketers
