= Edu Nandlal =

Surinamese footballer

Personal information
- Full name: Radjindernath Nandlal
- Date of birth: 1963 (age 62–63)
- Place of birth: Paramaribo, Suriname
- Position: Midfielder

Senior career*
Years	Team	Apps	(Gls)
- FC Utrecht
1985–1987	FC Emmen	7	(0)
1987–1989	Vitesse Arnhem		
- * Club domestic league appearances and goals

Radjindernath "Edu" Nandlal (born 1963) is a Surinamese former professional footballer who played as a midfielder for Dutch clubs FC Utrecht, FC Emmen and Vitesse Arnhem. He was one of the footballers that survived the Surinam Airways Flight 764 air crash in Paramaribo on 7 June 1989; however, he was partially paraplegic and was in a wheelchair for 1½ years. In 2001, Nandlal started his own cleaning company.
