= George Perrett (Australian footballer) =

Australian rules footballer

Personal information
- Full name: Hubert George Perrett
- Born: 4 September 1922; Albert Park, Victoria
- Died: 30 June 1989 (aged 66)
- Height: 180 cm (5 ft 11 in)
- Weight: 76 kg (168 lb)

Playing career^{1}
Years	Club	Games (Goals)
1946–47	South Melbourne	13 (4)
1949	Port Melbourne (VFA)	12 (9)
- ^{1} Playing statistics correct to the end of 1949.

Hubert George Perrett (4 September 1922 – 30 June 1989) was an Australian rules footballer who played with South Melbourne in the Victorian Football League (VFL).

Perrett also served in the Australian Army during World War II.
