= Vernon Grimshaw =

English cricketer

Personal information
- Full name: Vernon Grimshaw
- Born: 15 April 1916; Roundhay, Leeds, Yorkshire, England
- Died: 21 June 1989 (aged 73); Clifton, Bedfordshire, England
- Batting: Right-handed
- Bowling: Leg-break

Career statistics
Competition	First-class
Matches	19
Runs scored	418
Batting average	13.93
100s/50s	1/1
Top score	103
Balls bowled	78
Wickets	2
Bowling average	23.00
5 wickets in innings	0
10 wickets in match	0
Best bowling	1/2
Catches/stumpings	8/–
- Source: CricketArchive, 26 March 2009

Vernon Grimshaw (15 April 1916 – 21 June 1989) was an English cricketer: a right-handed batsman and leg break bowler who played 19 times for Worcestershire between 1936 and 1938. He averaged only 13.93 in that time, but his career did contain one undoubted highlight: scoring 103 while opening the batting against the New Zealanders in 1937. He took only two first-class wickets, one each in successive matches in 1936. His victims were both substantial cricketers: Tom Brierley and Harry Storer.

Grimshaw played at least once in the Minor Counties Championship for Bedfordshire, scoring 0 against Buckinghamshire in August 1955.

Grimshaw was born in Roundhay, Leeds, Yorkshire; he died in Clifton, Bedfordshire at the age of 73.
