= Andy Scharmin =

Surinamese-Dutch footballer (1967–1989)

Personal information
- Full name: Andy Scharmin
- Date of birth: 29 November 1967
- Date of death: 7 June 1989 (aged 21)
- Place of death: Paramaribo, Suriname
- Position: Left back

Youth career
- ????–????: VV Haaksbergen
- ????–1987: FC Twente

Senior career*
Years	Team	Apps	(Gls)
1987–1989	FC Twente		
- * Club domestic league appearances and goals

Andy Scharmin (29 November 1967 – 7 June 1989) was a Dutch footballer who played for FC Twente and captained the Netherlands under-21 team. He died on 7 June 1989 at the age of 21 in the Surinam Airways Flight 764 air crash.

== Media ==
- Video of Andy Scharmin against Roda JC. (FC Twente.nl)
- Video of FC Twente- Feyenoord Rotterdam (6-1). (FC Twente.nl)
