= Geoffrey Cradock-Watson =

English cricketer (1908–1989)

Personal information
- Full name: Geoffrey Gillman Cradock-Watson
- Born: 22 August 1908; Great Crosby, Lancashire, England
- Died: 24 June 1989 (aged 80); Gloucester, Gloucestershire, England
- Batting: Right-handed
- Role: Wicket-keeper

Domestic team information
- Years: Team
- 1937/38–1938/39: Northern India
- 1937/38–1939/40: Europeans

Career statistics
Competition	First-class
Matches	6
Runs scored	179
Batting average	14.91
100s/50s	0/0
Top score	33
Catches/stumpings	6/4
- Source: ESPNcricinfo, 11 February 2022

Geoffrey Gillman Cradock-Watson OBE (22 August 1908 — 24 June 1989) was an English first-class cricketer who played in India and an aviator.

Cradock-Watson was born at Great Crosby in Lancashire in August 1908. He was educated in Crosby at the Merchant Taylors' Boys' School, where his father was headmaster. At school, he captained the cricket team. He matriculated to St John's College, Oxford, where he gained a half blue in athletics.

After graduating from Oxford, Cradock-Watson began a career in the petroleum industry for Shell International. His first position was in British Burma, which was then administered as part of British India, where he was a marketing assistant from 1930 to 1940.

In the late 1930s, Cradock-Watson played first-class cricket for Northern India on three occasions in the Ranji Trophy from 1937 to 1939; he also made three first-class appearances for the Europeans cricket team from 1937 to 1940, including one appearance apiece in both the Bombay Pentangular and Madras Presidency Matches. In six first-class matches, he scored 179 runs at an average of 14.91 and with a highest score of 33. A wicket-keeper while fielding, he took 6 catches and made 4 stumpings.

He served with the Royal Air Force Volunteer Reserve in the Second World War, being commissioned as a pilot officer in the administrative and special duties branch. He was promoted to the war substantive rank of flying officer in January 1942, gaining the rank in full in November 1943. Cradock-Watson was made an OBE in the 1944 New Year Honours. He was mentioned in dispatches in January 1945, at which point he held the acting rank of wing commander. He served in both the European and Middle Eastern theatres. Following the end of the war, he was decorated by the United States as an Officer of the Legion of Merit in October 1945, in recognition of valuable services rendered during the war. After the war he resumed his career in the petroleum industry, working as an aviation manager for the Asiatic Petroleum Company. Cradock-Watson died at Gloucester in June 1989.
