= John Ryan (Australian rules footballer) =

Australian rules footballer

Personal information
- Full name: John Francis Ryan
- Born: 21 October 1909; Kyabram, Victoria
- Died: 10 June 1989 (aged 79)
- Original team: Brunswick
- Height: 175 cm (5 ft 9 in)
- Weight: 76 kg (168 lb)

Playing career^{1}
Years	Club	Games (Goals)
1931–1932	Essendon	5 (4)
1932	Fitzroy	4 (1)
Total		9 (5)
- ^{1} Playing statistics correct to the end of 1932.

John Francis Ryan (21 October 1909 – 10 June 1989) was an Australian rules footballer who played for Essendon and Fitzroy in the Victorian Football League (VFL).

== Family ==
John was the son of Sydney Arthur Ryan (1884-1964), and Mary Ryan (1883-1967), née Edis. He was born in Kyabram, Victoria, on 21 October 1909.

John married Jemima "Mimie" Thompson (1909-1992) in 1932, and they had two children.

== Football ==
=== Essendon (VFL) ===
Ryan played as a rover and was a regular player with the Second XVIII. He played for the Essendon First XVIII in five senior games, scoring 4 goals over the 1931 and 1932 seasons.

=== Fitzroy (VFL) ===
He transferred to Fitzroy in June 1932, making his debut for the team against Hawthorn at the Brunswick Street Oval on 25 June 1932.

== Military service ==
Ryan served in the Australian Army during World War II.

== Death ==
He died on 10 June 1989.
