= Joe Knott =

Australian rules footballer, born 1907

Personal information
- Full name: Joseph James Knott
- Born: 2 April 1907; Footscray, Victoria
- Died: 12 June 1989 (aged 82)
- Original team: Yarraville
- Height: 177 cm (5 ft 10 in)
- Weight: 78 kg (172 lb)

Playing career^{1}
Years	Club	Games (Goals)
1926	Footscray	5 (0)
1928–30	Yarraville (VFA)	35 (7)
1930–31	North Melbourne	16 (0)
1931–32	Brunswick (VFA)	16 (5)
1934–36	Coburg (VFA)	38 (5)
- ^{1} Playing statistics correct to the end of 1936.

Joseph James Knott (2 April 1907 – 12 June 1989) was an Australian rules footballer who played with Footscray and North Melbourne in the Victorian Football League (VFL).
