= Rudy Degenaar =

Surinamese footballer

Personal information
- Full name: Ruud Degenaar
- Date of birth: 21 August 1963
- Place of birth: Hengelo, Netherlands
- Date of death: 7 June 1989 (aged 25)
- Place of death: Paramaribo, Suriname
- Position: Defender

Youth career
- Achilles'12
- Go Ahead Eagles

Senior career*
Years	Team	Apps	(Gls)
1984–1989	Heracles	106	(13)
- * Club domestic league appearances and goals

Ruud "Rudy" Degenaar (21 August 1963 – 7 June 1989 near Zanderij Airport) was a Dutch footballer. He died at the age of 25, when on 7 June 1989 he was killed in the Surinam Airways Flight 764 air crash in Paramaribo.

== Club career ==
During his career he played for Heracles Almelo.

== Personal life ==
His father, Dolf Degenaar, was also a professional footballer, who played for PEC Zwolle in the 1960s.

=== Death ===
He was invited by Sonny Hasnoe, the founder of the Colourful 11, to be part of the team and travel to Suriname to play in the Boxel Kleurrijk Tournament with three Surinamese teams. The Surinam Airways Flight PY764 crashed during approach to Zanderij International Airport, killing 176 of the 187 on board, including Degenaar and his girlfriend Hedwig Wolthuis, making it the worst ever aviation disaster in Suriname's history. Among the dead were a total of 15 members of the Colourful 11; only three of them survived.
