= Surinam Airways Flight 764 =

1989 plane crash in Suriname

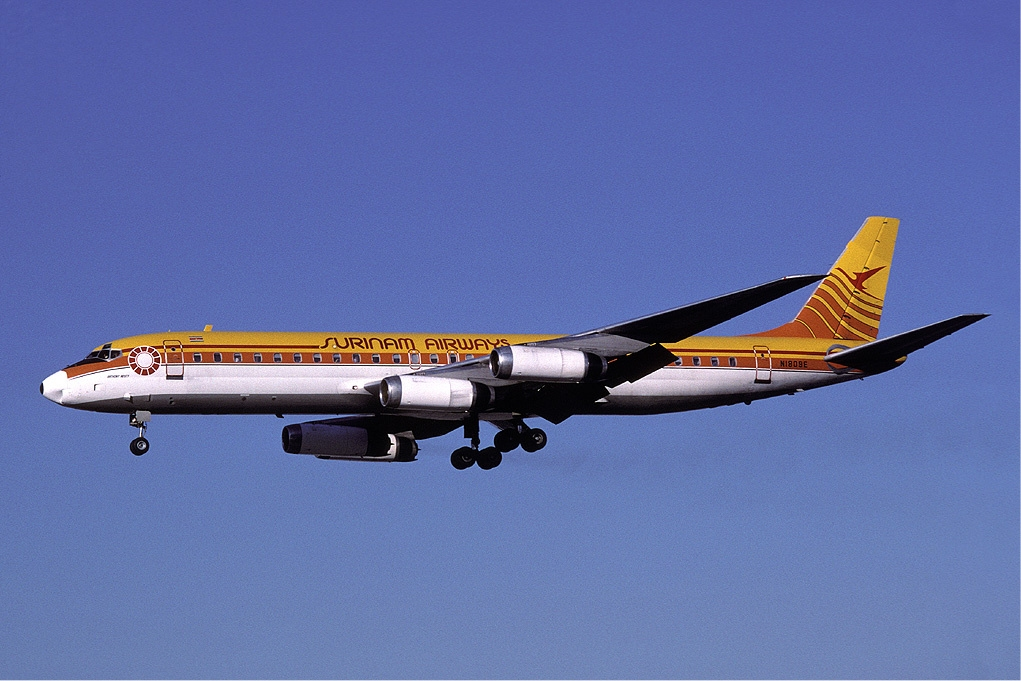
- N1809E, the aircraft involved in the accident, seen in February 1989

Accident
- Date: 7 June 1989
- Summary: Controlled flight into terrain due to pilot error
- Site: Near Johan Adolf Pengel Int'l Airport, Zanderij, Suriname; 5°27′12″N 55°13′47″W

Aircraft
- Aircraft type: McDonnell Douglas DC-8-62
- Aircraft name: Anthony Nesty
- Operator: Surinam Airways
- IATA flight No.: PY764
- ICAO flight No.: SLM764
- Call sign: SURINAM 764
- Registration: N1809E
- Flight origin: Amsterdam Airport Schiphol; Amsterdam, Netherlands
- Destination: Johan Adolf Pengel Int'l Airport; Paramaribo, Suriname
- Occupants: 187
- Passengers: 178
- Crew: 9
- Fatalities: 178
- Injuries: 9
- Survivors: 9

Surinam Airways Flight 764 was an international scheduled passenger flight of Surinam Airways from Amsterdam Airport Schiphol in the Netherlands to Paramaribo-Zanderij International Airport in Suriname. On 7 June 1989, the DC-8-62 serving the flight crashed during approach to Paramaribo-Zanderij, killing 178 of the 187 on board. It is the deadliest aviation disaster in Suriname's history.

Investigation revealed significant deficiencies in the crew's training and judgement. They knowingly attempted to land using an inappropriate navigation signal and ignored alarms warning them of an impending crash. The safety issues stemming from the incident were of such concern that the United States National Transportation Safety Board (NTSB) issued safety recommendations to the Federal Aviation Administration (FAA).

== Aircraft and crew ==
The aircraft (named Anthony Nesty in honor of the Olympic swimmer) was a four-engined McDonnell Douglas DC-8-62 passenger jet which had first flown in 1969 as part of the air fleet of Braniff International Airways. An NTSB brief shows that while the aircraft was owned by Braniff it was involved in a minor accident in 1979 in which there were no fatalities. The aircraft was sold to Surinam Airways shortly afterwards. The official report into the crash of Flight 764 made no indication that this previous incident contributed in any way to the subsequent fatal crash.

The flight crew consisted of Captain Wilbert "Will" Rogers (66), First Officer Glyn Tobias (43) and Flight Engineer Warren Rose (65). Captain Rogers had a total of 19,450 flight hours, including 8,800 hours on the DC-8. The first officer and flight engineer had 6,600 flight hours and 26,600 flight hours respectively. The flight engineer also had 720 flight hours on the DC-8. There were six flight attendants on board.

== History of the flight ==
The flight departed Amsterdam Schiphol Airport as scheduled at 23:25 on 6 June. The next ten hours of the flight passed uneventfully. The crew received a final weather report and clearance for a VOR/DME (VHF omnidirectional range/Distance Measuring Equipment) approach to runway 10 but instead initiated an ILS (Instrument Landing System) approach. During the approach, the plane's no. 2 engine struck a tree at a height of approximately 25 metres (82 ft) above ground level. The outboard right wing then struck another tree, shearing it off and causing the aircraft to roll over and impact the ground inverted. Of the 9 crew and 178 passengers, only 9 passengers survived, leaving 178 dead (including all crew).

== Colourful 11 ==
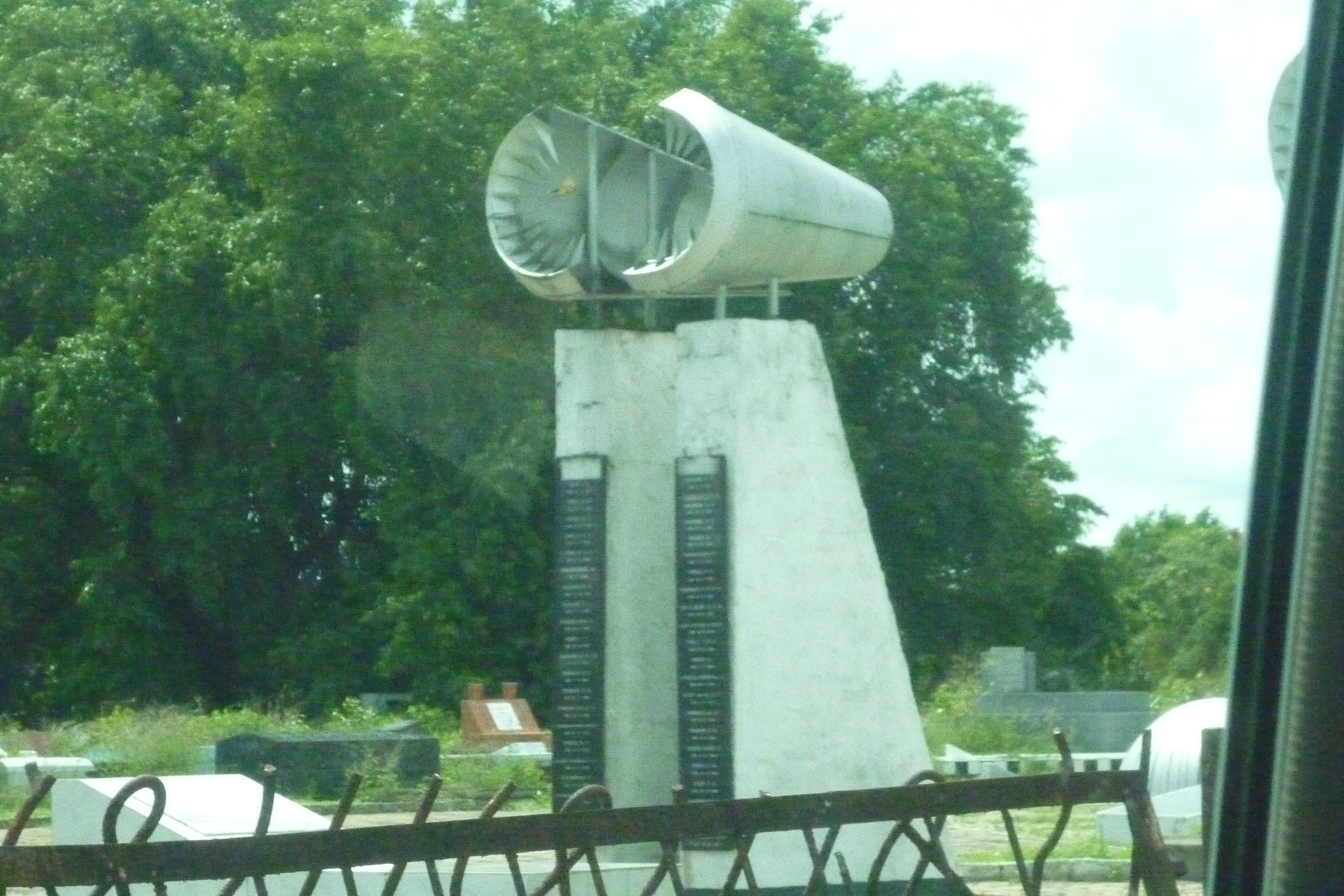
A memorial in Paramaribo

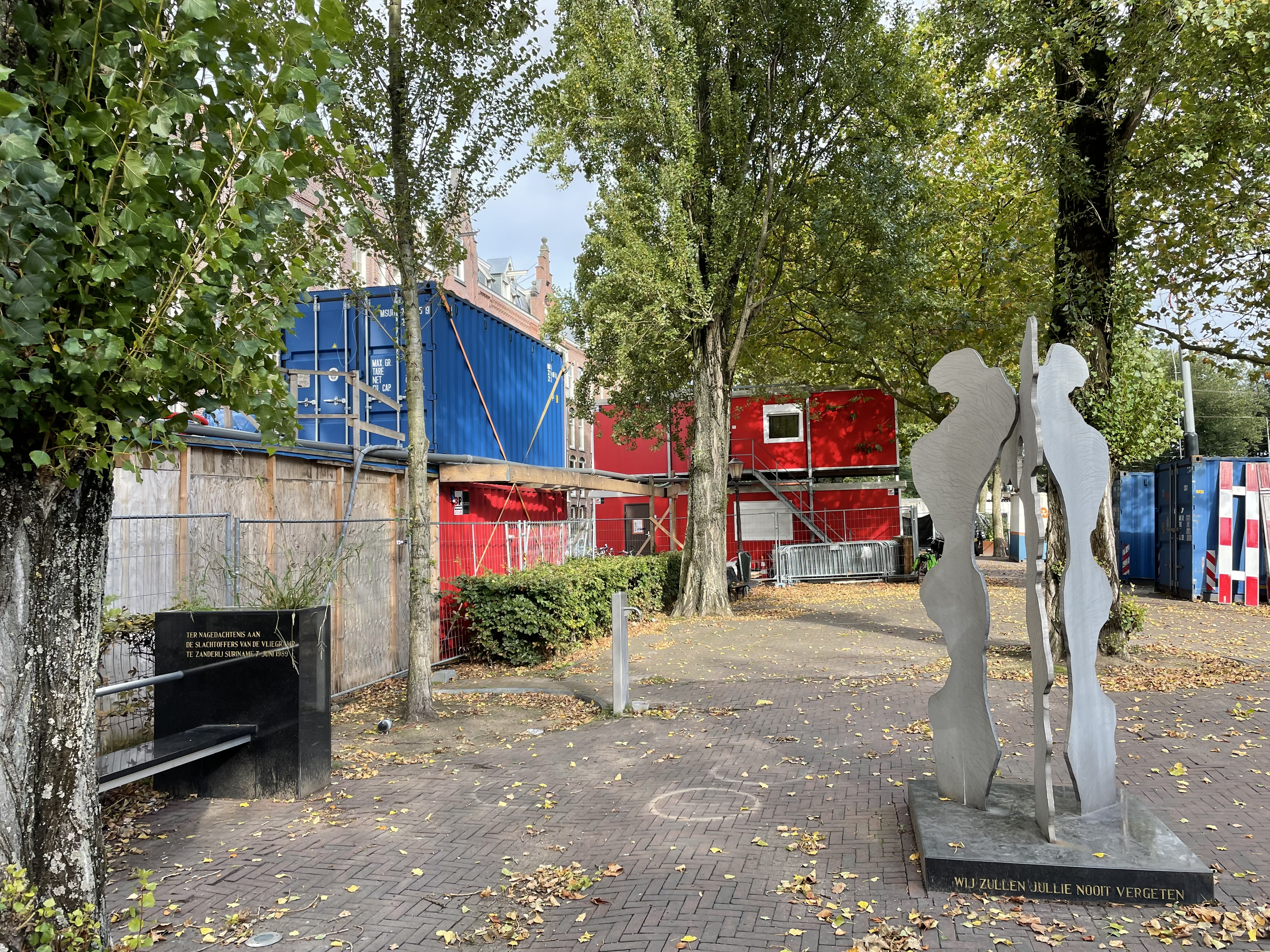
Monument's-Gravesandeplein, Amsterdam, dedicated to the victims of the flight

Among the dead were a group of Surinamese association football players playing professionally in the Netherlands, organised as an exhibition team known as the Colourful 11 (Dutch: Kleurrijk Elftal). The team was an initiative of Dutch Surinamese social worker Sonny Hasnoe who worked with underprivileged children in disadvantaged neighbourhoods in Amsterdam. Many people of Surinamese origin lived in the city's Bijlmer district and were isolated from mainstream Dutch society. Hasnoe often found that he could engage the youngsters socially if they saw positive role models that had the same background as they did. He encouraged young boys to join football clubs and noted an improvement in their behaviour when they were playing sports as it gave them an opportunity to interact with their white contemporaries and so helped speed up the process of social integration.

In 1986, Sonny Hasnoe organised the first match between a star selection of Surinamese Dutch professionals and SV Robinhood, champions of the domestic Surinamese competition. The match was a great success and further contests were arranged. The Colourful 11 were to play a match in Suriname in June 1989; however, a number of players were denied permission to travel by their Dutch professional clubs. Among the players who stayed back as a result were Ruud Gullit, Frank Rijkaard, Aron Winter, Bryan Roy, Stanley Menzo, Dean Gorre, Jos Luhukay and Regi Blinker. A group of eighteen "second stringers" travelled to Suriname instead. Former Ajax players and Dutch internationals Henny Meijer and Stanley Menzo – who ignored his club's decree and went to Suriname on his own accord – had taken an earlier flight.

The following football players were killed in the crash:

- Ruud Degenaar, 25, Heracles Almelo
- Lloyd Doesburg, 29, AFC Ajax
- Steve van Dorpel, 23, FC Volendam
- Wendel Fräser, 22, RBC Roosendaal
- Frits Goodings, 25, FC Wageningen
- Jerry Haatrecht, 28, Neerlandia, was travelling in place of his brother Winston Haatrecht who had post-season duties with his club SC Heerenveen.
- Virgall Joemankhan, 20, Cercle Brugge
- Andro Knel, 21, NAC Breda
- Ruben Kogeldans, 22, Willem II Tilburg
- Ortwin Linger, 21, HFC Haarlem, died three days after the crash as a result of his injuries
- Fred Patrick, 23, PEC Zwolle
- Andy Scharmin, 21, FC Twente
- Elfried Veldman, 23, De Graafschap
- Florian Vijent, 27, Telstar
- Nick Stienstra, 34, RC Heemstede (coach)

The following survived:

- Sigi Lens, 25, Fortuna Sittard, was permanently prohibited from playing football after suffering a complicated pelvic fracture.
- Edu Nandlal, 25, Vitesse, suffered a partial spinal cord lesion but recovered, walking with a limp.
- Radjin de Haan, 19, Telstar, returned to football but was forced to retire early as his fractured vertebra meant that he could not reach his former performance.

In 2005, Dutch journalist Iwan Tol released his book about this lost generation of Surinamese players called: Eindbestemming Zanderij. Het vergeten verhaal van het kleurrijk elftal (ISBN 90-204-0366-4).

== Investigation and probable cause ==
A commission was set up by the Surinamese government to investigate the accident. The results of that investigation are described below.

The final weather report sent to the aircraft stated a visibility of 900 metres in fog, with a cloud base of 400 feet (120 m), and calm winds. This surprised the flight crew because previous weather information had given a visibility of 6,000 metres (3.7 mi; 3.2 nmi). As a result, the aircraft was cleared for a VOR/DME (VHF omnidirectional range/distance measuring equipment) approach, the crew instead initiated an ILS/DME approach. ILS navigational equipment is normally more accurate than VOR/DME equipment, but in this case, the ILS equipment at Zanderij airport, though transmitting signals, was not suitable nor available for operational use. The investigation showed that the crewmembers were aware of this. The cockpit voice recorder captured the first officer saying, "I don't trust that ILS", but the captain chose to use it regardless. He did instruct the first officer to tune the required navigational equipment for the functional VOR/DME approach, most likely for use as a gross error check.

In the dark, because of the unreliability of the ILS signal, the aircraft descended too low, triggering several audible and visual warnings. The crew ignored these warnings and descended below the minimum altitude allowed for either the VOR/DME or ILS approaches without positive visual contact with the runway. The crew may have been motivated by the aircraft's low fuel state. The aircraft crashed at 04:27 local time.

The NTSB investigation discovered that captain Rogers, at age 66, was over the maximum age (60) allowed for a captain on this flight. Additionally, he was not properly approved for operating the aircraft type, as his most recent check had been on a small, piston-drive, twin-engine aircraft instead of the DC-8. Partly as a result of name confusion in his check paperwork, this incorrect check went unnoticed by the airline. The co-pilot had false identity papers.

The "probable cause" paragraph from the report reads as follows:

The Commission determines: a) That as a result of the captain's glaring carelessness and recklessness the aircraft was flown below the published minimum altitudes during the approach and consequently collided with a tree. b) As underlying factor in the accident was the failure of SLM's (Surinam Airways) operational management to observe the pertinent regulations as well as the procedures prescribed in the SLM Operations Manual concerning qualification and certification during recruitment and employment of the crew members furnished by Air Crews International.

== NTSB recommendations to the FAA ==
Even though the accident was not under U.S. jurisdiction, the NTSB (National Transportation Safety Board) was actively involved in the investigation because the aircraft was U.S.-registered. As a result of its findings, a number of safety recommendations were made to the FAA. These recommendations were made only to the FAA and not the government of Suriname or its bodies of investigation because the scope of the investigation was restricted by jurisdictional issues.

The following recommendations were made:

- Perform ramp and en route inspections of air carriers operating aircraft under 14 CFR part 129 that are registered in the United States.
- Require air carriers operating into the United States under part 129 to provide the FAA with a list of the names, dates of birth, and certificate number of all captains and first officers operating airplanes into the United States. If pilots are found to have reached their 60th birthday, inform the air carrier that these pilots are not authorised to operate as either captain or copilot under the terms of the operations specifications issued in accordance with Part 129. (Class 11, Priority Action) (A-90-52)
- Promulgate rules to regulate United States companies that provide pilots by contract to international air carriers. (Class 11, Priority Action) (A-90-53)

== See also ==
- Controlled flight into terrain
- List of accidents involving sports teams
- El Al Flight 1862 – 1992 cargo aircraft crash in the Bijlmer area of Amsterdam
- Thai Airways International Flight 311, Air Inter Flight 148, Air China Flight 129, Pakistan International Airlines Flight 268, Trans-Colorado Airlines Flight 2286 and Northwest Airlink Flight 5719, all CFIT accidents caused by multiple pilot errors.
