= Johan Adolf Pengel International Airport =

International airport in Zanderij, Suriname

Johan Adolf Pengel International Airport Paramaribo-Zanderij International Airport
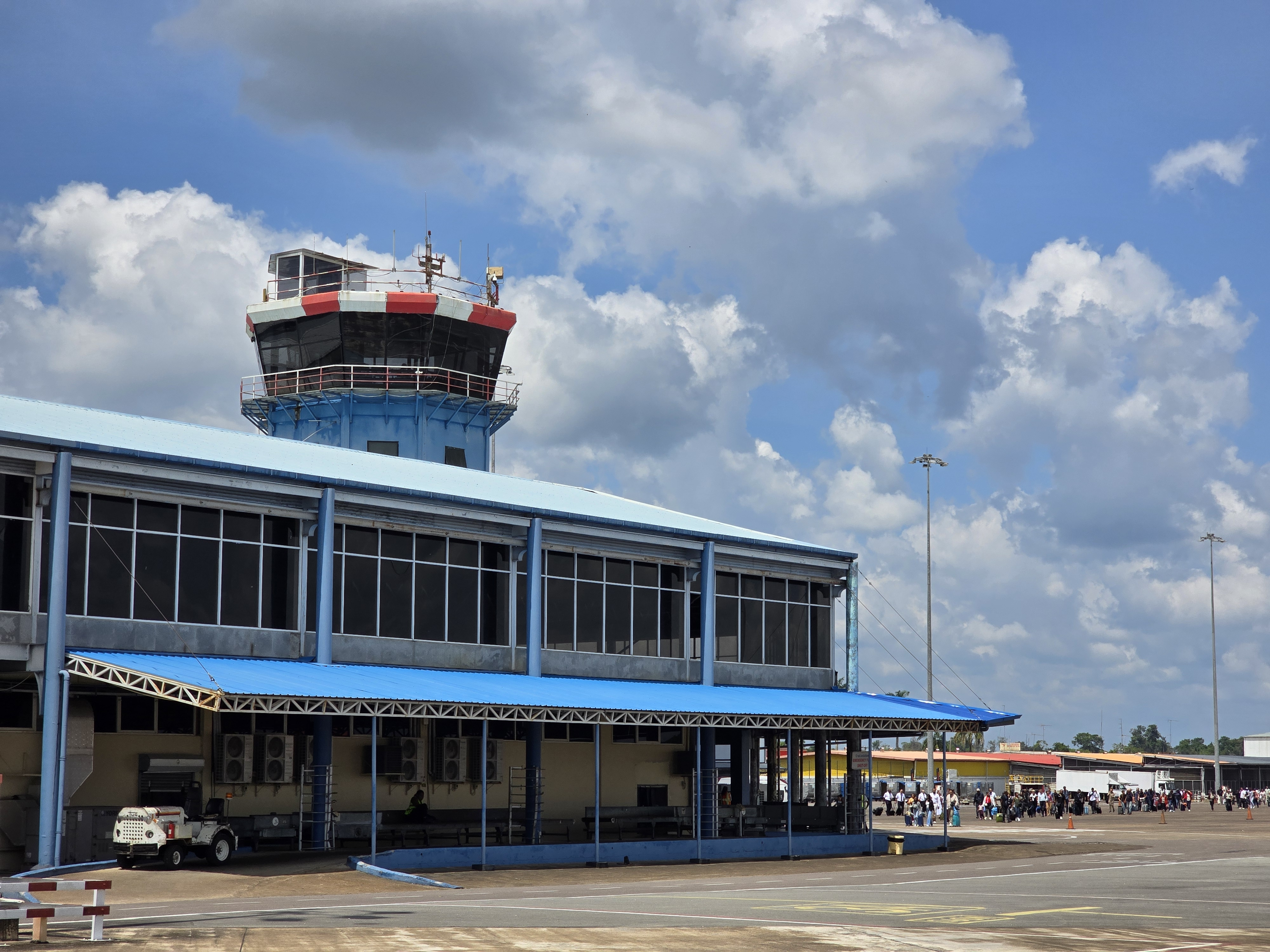
- IATA: PBM; ICAO: SMJP; WMO: 81225

Summary
- Airport type: Public
- Operator: Johan Adolf Pengel International Airport (JAPIA) Corporation
- Serves: Paramaribo
- Location: Zanderij, Suriname
- Hub for: Fly All Ways; Surinam Airways
- Elevation AMSL: 59 ft (18 m)
- Coordinates: 05°27′10″N 055°11′17″W
- Website: japi-airport.com

Map
- Location in Suriname PBM/SMJP (South America) PBM/SMJP (America)

Runways
Direction	Length		Surface
Direction	m	ft	Surface
11/29	3,480	11,417	Concrete

Statistics (2025)
- Total passengers: 519,171
- Aircraft movements: 3,359
- Source: JAPI Airport

Johan Adolf Pengel International Airport (IATA: PBM, ICAO: SMJP), commonly known as Paramaribo-Zanderij International Airport, and locally referred to simply as JAP, is the primary international airport serving Paramaribo, Suriname. It is located in the town of Zanderij, Suriname, 45 kilometres (28 mi) south of Paramaribo. It is the larger of the three airports serving the city, the others being Zorg en Hoop and Gummels Airports.

== History ==
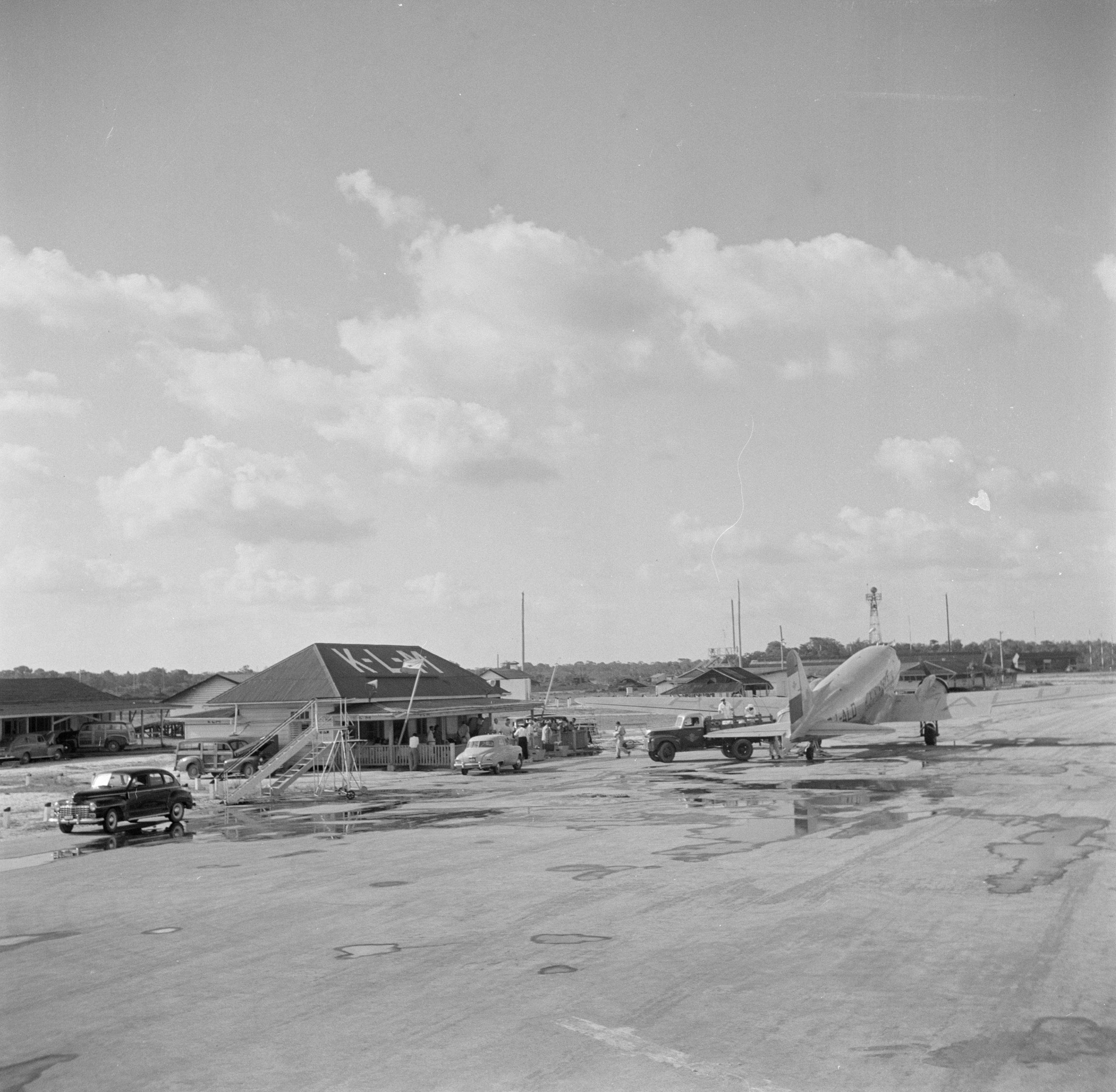
The airport in 1948

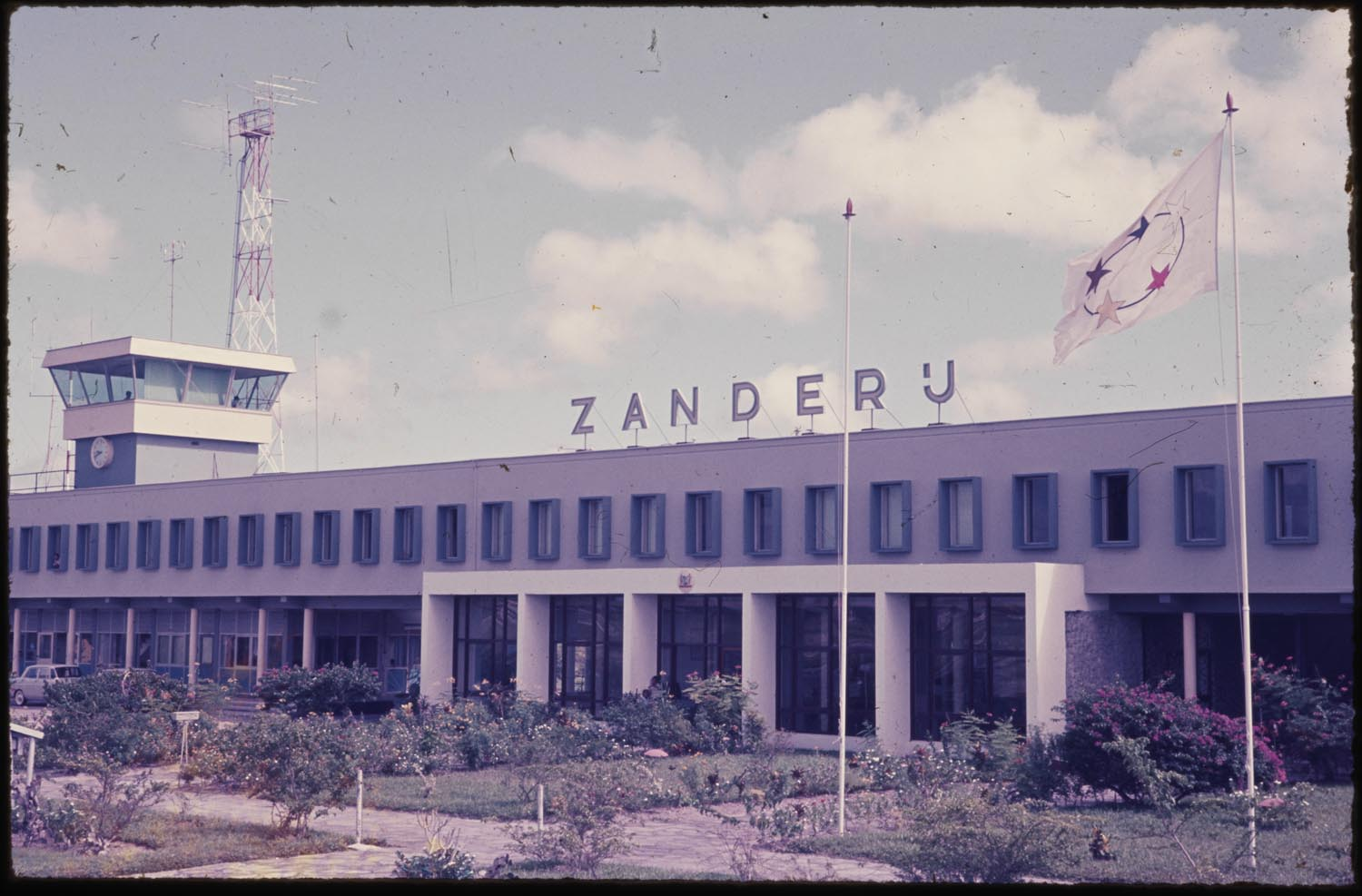
The airport, c. 1960s

=== The early years ===
Prior to World War II, Zandery Airport was a Pan American World Airways (PAA) stop. In 1928, PAA started mail flights from Miami to Paramaribo, the capital of the then Dutch colony Suriname. PAA used Sikorsky S-38 amphibians. Rich and famous Americans, mostly aviators, visited Suriname.

On 24 March 1934, female pilot Guggenheim and male pilot Russel Thaw had to make an emergency landing near the Nieuwe Haven, because they could not find Zanderij airfield. The Lockheed airplane was so severely damaged that it was shipped back to the United States.

On 16 April 1934, female aviator Laura Ingalls landed in a single engine airplane, the Lockheed Air Express at Zanderij in the first solo flight around South America in a landplane.

The KLM tri-motor Fokker F.XVIII, named the Snip (Snipe), made a trans-atlantic crossing from Amsterdam via Paramaribo to Curaçao, carrying mail. The trip of 12,200 km (7,600 mi) (more than 4,200 km (2,600 mi) over water) landed eight days after take-off from Schiphol, on 22 December 1934, at Hato Airport. The captain was J.J. Hongdong, co-pilot/navigator J.J. van Balkom, engineer L.D. Stolk, and wireless operator S. v.d. Molen. The route was from Amsterdam via Marseille, Alicante, Casablanca, Cabo Verde, Paramaribo and Caracas. The Snip landed at Zanderij Field on 20 December 1934, after a first trans-Atlantic crossing of 3,600 km (2,200 mi), dubbed "the Christmas Mail-flight", directly from Porto Praia. However, the flight did not inaugurate a regular KLM trans-Atlantic service.

In January 1937 William Henry Vanderbilt III landed in a baby Clipper Sikorsky S-38 at Zanderij with wife and friends The Flying Hutchinsons.

On 3 June 1937, aviation pioneer Amelia Earhart landed at Zanderij with a Lockheed Model 10 Electra at local time 2:38 P.M. The navigator was a retired PAA aviator Fred Noonan. This was on their second attempt of a "world flight" en route from Miami to Natal and then transatlantic to Dakar, Senegal. They stayed overnight at the Palace Hotel in Paramaribo and left Zanderij again on Friday 4 June 1937 for Fortaleza, Brazil. One month later they disappeared over the central Pacific Ocean near Howland Island.

On 16 March 1938, pilots Whitney and Harmon made an emergency landing with their Beechcraft on an airstrip near the Eerste Rijweg. They could not find Zanderij Airfield.

In 1938, the KLM started a weekly service between Paramaribo and Willemstad (Curaçao) with a twin engined Lockheed L-14 Super Electra able to carry 12 passengers and named MEEUW (PJ-AIM). Mail arrived much faster at Curaçao than with PAA, but the service was not a commercial success.

On 11 May 1939, The Flying Hutchinsons arrived at Zanderij in a twin engine Lockheed Electra, on their "family round-the-world global nations flight", which was broadcast on a radio series sponsored by Pepsi Cola.

=== Expansion during World War II by the US Armed Forces ===
After the fall of the Netherlands to German forces in 1940, the United States obtained military basing rights to the airport from the Netherlands government-in-exile in London. Suriname was then the world's principal source of bauxite (for aluminium production) and needed protection. The first American armed forces arrived at the airport on 30 November 1941, and expanded the facilities to be a transport base for sending Lend-Lease supplies to England via air routes across the South Atlantic Ocean. The runways were constructed by the US Corps of Engineers. They also built the road from Onverwacht to Zanderij which was completed in 1942.

With the United States' entry into the war in December 1941, the importance of Zandery Field increased drastically, becoming a major transport base on the South Atlantic route of Air Transport Command ferrying supplies and personnel to Freetown Airport, Sierra Leone, and onwards to the European and African theaters of the war. In addition, antisubmarine patrols were flown from the airfield over the southern Caribbean and South Atlantic coastlines.

Major United States Army Air Force (USAAF) units assigned to the airfield were:

- 35th Bombardment Squadron (25th Bombardment Group) 1 November 1941 – 7 October 1943 (B-25 Mitchell)

Detachment operated from: Atkinson Field, British Guiana, 1 November 1942 – 7 October 1943
Detachment operated from: Piarco Airport, Trinidad, 27 August – 12 October 1943

- 99th Bombardment Squadron (9th Bombardment Group), 3 December 1941 – 31 October 1942 (B-18 Bolo)
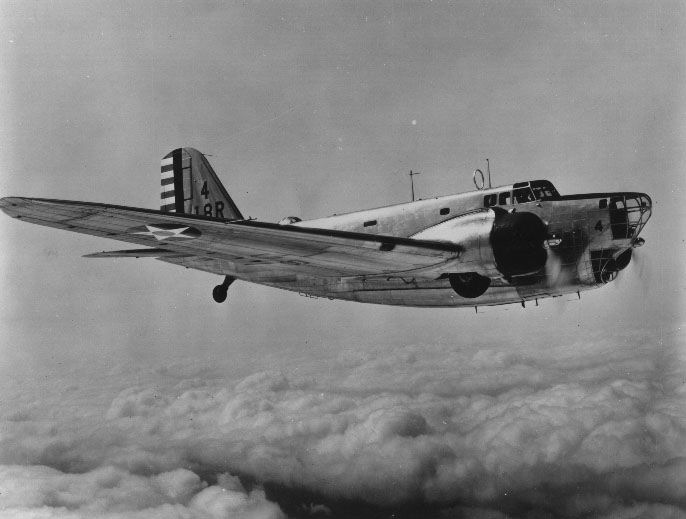
  A Douglas B-18A Bolo assigned to the 99th Bombardment Squadron (Heavy) on patrol from Zandery Field, Dutch Guiana, 1942
- 22nd Fighter Squadron (36th Fighter Group), 16 September 1942 – 16 February 1943 (P-39 Airacobras, later P-47 Thunderbolts)
- 23d Antisubmarine Squadron (Trinidad Detachment, Antilles Air Command), 15 August – December 1943 (A-29 Hudson)

Just before the Pearl Harbor attack, on 3 December, the 99th Squadron was ordered to distant Zandery Field, Dutch Guiana (by way of Piarco Field, Trinidad, under an agreement with the Dutch government-in-exile, by which the United States occupied the colony to protect bauxite mines. However, to the disappointment of the crews, the squadron had to leave its B-17 behind. It was, however, reinforced with additional B-18A Bolos, bringing squadron strength up to six aircraft. On 2 October 1942, a B-18A, piloted by Captain Howard Burhanna Jr. of the 99th Bomb Squadron, depth charged and sank the German submarine U-512 north of Cayenne, French Guiana.

At Zandery, the unit shuttled from Zandery to Atkinson Field, British Guiana, and, by January 1942, had eight Curtiss P-40C Warhawks assigned. The P-40s were, in actuality, detached for airfield defense by the Trinidad Base Command, under which the 99th fell at the time.

The intensive flying of the first two months of the war soon took its toll, however, and by the end of February 1942, the Squadron was forced to report that it had but three B-18As operational at Zandery and that " ... none of them are airworthy at this time." Apparently the unit was quickly reinforced, and by 1 March, strength was back up to six aircraft, and seven combat crews, all of whom had more than 12 months' experience.

Operations from Zandery Field consisted of coastal, convoy and anti-submarine patrols until 31 October 1942, just prior to which time the 4th Antisubmarine Squadron was attached to the Squadron between 9 and 16 October. At this point, Antisubmarine Command took over the mission of the 99th and the men and the aircraft of the squadron were reassigned.

In the middle of World War II, on 2 November 1943, Her Royal Highness Princess Juliana visited Suriname from Canada. She landed at Zanderij in a KLM Lockheed Model 14 Super Electra PJ-AIM Meeuw as the first ever member of the Dutch royal family to visit Suriname. After the landing of the Meeuw and escorting Dutch and US military planes, the Royal Princess was welcomed by Governor Kielstra and inspected the guard of honour.

With the end of World War II, Zandery Airfield was reduced in scope to a skeleton staff. It was closed as a military facility on 30 April 1946, and on 22 October 1947, the Zandery Air Force Base was turned over to Dutch authorities which returned it to a civil airport. At that time, the value of the facility was estimated to be 400,000 Surinamese guilders (Sƒ).

=== Highlights in the years after the second World War ===
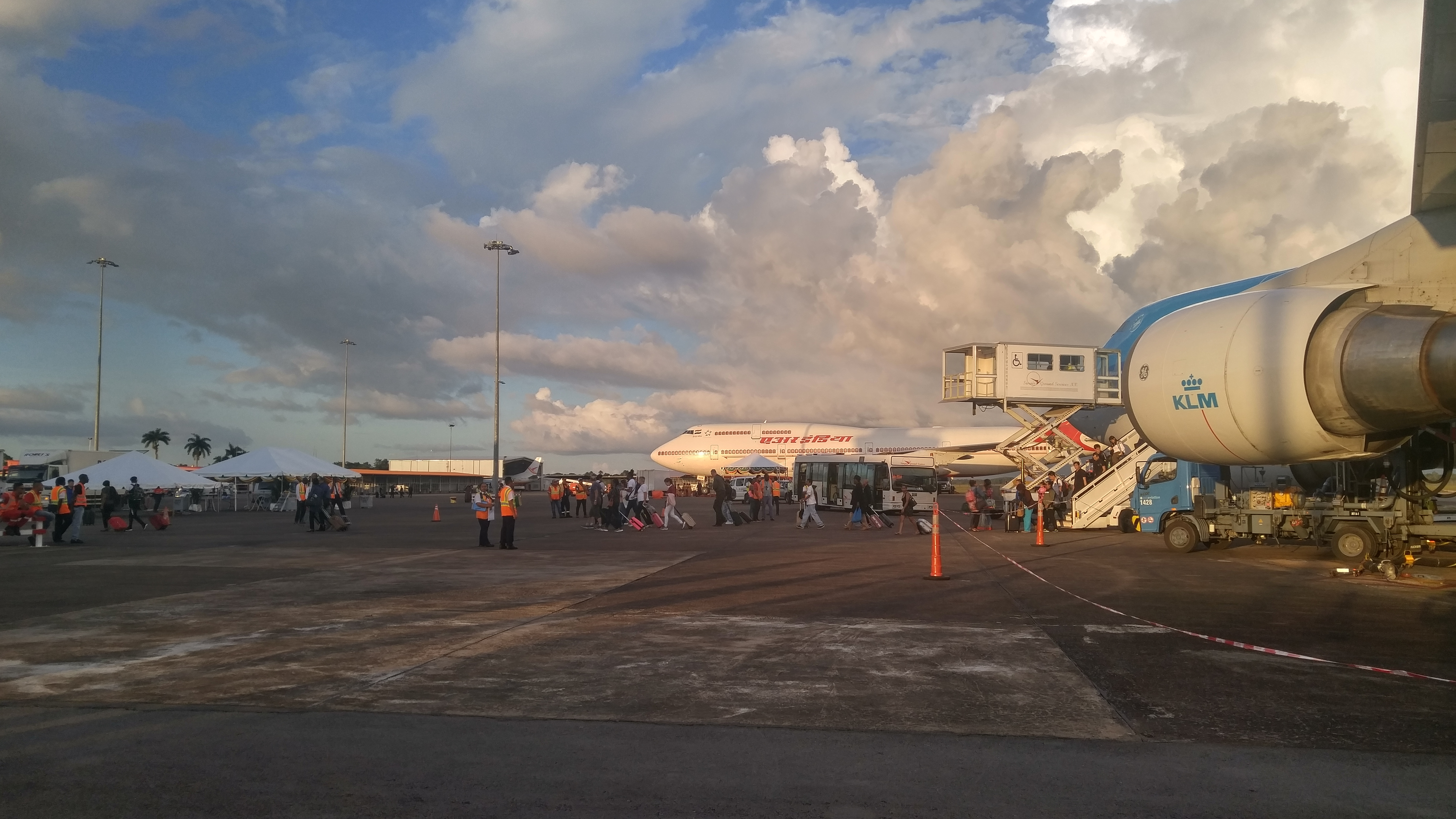
Passengers disembarking from a KLM airliner (foreground) at Johan Pengel Airport. The president of India and his entourage had arrived via the Air India airliner (background) moments prior. 19 June 2018.

In March 1947, Alfredo de Los Rios landed with an 8-F Luscombe plane at Zanderij. He had traveled from the aircraft factory in Dallas, Texas, in the United States.

In June 1959, pilots and missionaries Robert Price and Eugene Friesen arrived at Zandery with a single engine plane during Operation Grasshopper. They performed much medical treatment work in the interior and the Sipaliwini Savanna.

On 3 March 1960, American president Dwight D. Eisenhower landed at Zanderij on board Air Force One operated by the U.S. Air Force with a Boeing 707 jetliner. He was accompanied by Secretary of State Christian Herter. They left Suriname the same day.

On 14 April 1967, American president Lyndon B. Johnson arrived during a rainstorm at Zanderij on board Air Force One, a Boeing 707 jet. Security was tight around Zanderij Airport.

An agreement was signed by the Dutch government and the US to use Zanderij Airport for Military Airlift Command (MAC) purposes. The USA paid US$22,000 for 400 landings per year. The crews stayed overnight at the Torarica Hotel.

The North American X-15 NASA rocket-powered aircraft was on exhibition at Zanderij Airport for an airshow held from 8 to 13 November 1963.

On 7 April 1972, the first-ever Boeing 747 wide-body jetliner to land in South America, operated by KLM Royal Dutch Airlines, landed at Zanderij Airport, Suriname.

With one of the longest runways in the Caribbean region, it served the Antonov An-225 Mriya – the world's largest cargo plane in 2010.

The airport is officially named after the popular Surinamese politician and former Prime Minister of Suriname, Johan Adolf Pengel, but is locally still called Zanderij. This is parallel to the small village and savannah where it is situated.

The airport now has one runway of approximately 3.5 km (11,000 ft) and reached an average of 500,000 passengers yearly in December 2019. This is achieved mainly on transatlantic flights between Paramaribo and Amsterdam by KLM, TUI fly Netherlands and Surinam Airways, and some regional flights to Belém, Georgetown, Cayenne, Panama City and Miami by Trans Guyana Airways with their Beechcraft 1900D, Copa Airlines, Gol and Surinam Airways with their Boeing 737's as well as flights to the Caribbean island destinations of Aruba, Curacao, Havana, Santiago de Cuba and Port of Spain accommodated by Caribbean Airlines, besides local companies Fly All Ways and Surinam Airways. Cargo flights are performed by Amerijet International and Northern Air Cargo.

=== Future ===
The state will invest an extra US$70 million in expanding and modernizing the J.A. Pengel Airport. US$28.5 million has been invested so far in the airport's modernization. For the time being, the arrival lounge, commercial center and parking lot have been handed over, while the runway has been repaved, the platform for planes has been renovated, the runway lights on the arrival side have been replaced and a backup system for electricity has been installed. This was all done prior to the 30 August 2013 UNASUR heads-of-state summit, hosted by Suriname.

The project, which was prepared during the previous administration, is insufficient to actually turn the airport into an international hub. The departure and arrival lounges are currently apart from each other, but plans are to connect them in the future with airbridges. Lights were placed on the departure side of the runway, and the platform was expanded to accommodate more planes. The fire department barracks were moved to a more central location. Plans are to have the airbridges installed in the future, while the other matters were finished by 2017. The expansion of the airport will not only include the construction of a new terminal, but also the construction of a 2.7 km (8,900 ft) taxiway that will run parallel to the long 3.5 km (11,000 ft) runway. The total investment involves an amount of approximately US$205 million, and approval for the loan agreement was to be put forward to the National Assembly (DNA) of the Surinamese government by airport management mid-2019. The new airport terminal with a much more capacious arrival and departure hall is planned for the near future, the result of investment from China, as the current airport terminal cannot facilitate an increasing number of passengers while the Johan Adolf Pengel International Airport is making a continuous effort in route development management to attract more airlines. Suriname is looking into new markets through bilateral and open-skies agreements with different countries.

== Airlines and destinations ==
=== Passenger ===
The following airlines operate regular scheduled and charter flights to and from Paramaribo:

Airlines	Destinations
Caribbean Airlines	Port of Spain
Copa Airlines	Panama City–Tocumen
Fly All Ways	Camagüey, Georgetown–Cheddi Jagan, Havana, Santiago de Cuba
Gol Linhas Aéreas	Belém
KLM	Amsterdam
Surinam Airways	Amsterdam, Aruba, Barbados, Belém, Curaçao, Georgetown–Cheddi Jagan, Miami
Sky High	Santo Domingo–Las Américas
Trans Guyana Airways	Georgetown–Ogle

=== Cargo ===
Airlines	Destinations
Amerijet International	Miami

== Statistics ==
Annual passenger traffic and aircraft movements
Year	Passengers	% change	Year	A/C movements
2013	455,426	▲ %	2013	3222
2014	457,666	▲1.00%	2014	3127
2015	482,570	▲1.06%	2015	3505
2016	478,537	▼0.99%	2016	3664
2017	445,104	▼0.93%	2017	2877
2018	450,979	▲1.01%	2018	2813
2019	528,999	▲11.73%	2019	4679
2020	157,337	▼66.38%	2020	2266
2021	138,346	▼1.14%	2021	2312
2022	416,088	▲30.08%	2022	4411
2023	464,222	▲1.11%	2023	4128
2024	489,767	▲5.50%	2024	3466
2025	519,171	▲6.00%	2025	3359

== Incidents and accidents ==
- On 7 June 1960, a Douglas C-124 Globemaster II from the United States Air Force (USAF), registered 52-0993, flew into trees while on final approach in poor weather. The military airplane was approaching Paramaribo-Zanderij International Airport (PBM) in Suriname for a refueling stop on its way to Recife, Brazil. The crashed airplane departed from Charleston Air Force Base in the United States. Three of the seven crew members died in the crash.
- On 3 May 1972, a Douglas C-124 Globemaster II from the US Air National Guard (ANG), registered 52-1055, flew into a 1,716-foot (523 m)-high hill 68 km (42 miles) south-east of Paramaribo-Zanderij International Airport (PBM). The airplane operated on a military flight from Rio de Janeiro, Brazil, to Memphis, Tennessee, USA, with an en route stop at Paramaribo, Suriname. All 11 on board died.
- On 5 May 1978, a Douglas DC-6A from the Surinaamse Luchtvaart Maatschappij, registered N3493F was damaged beyond repair while landing at Paramaribo-Zanderij International Airport (PBM) on a cargo flight from Curaçao Hato International Airport. All three occupants survived.
- On 7 June 1989, Surinam Airways Flight 764, a Douglas DC-8, registered N1809E, from Amsterdam Airport Schiphol in the Netherlands crashed during approach to Johan Adolf Pengel International Airport; 176 of the 187 on board died. The crash was the worst-ever aviation disaster in Suriname's history. Among the dead were fifteen Surinamese-Dutch professional football players. The airplane, named "Anthony Nesty", was leased from Arrow Air, painted in Surinam Airways colours.

== See also ==
- List of airports in Suriname
- Transport in Suriname
