= Xavier =

Xavier or Xabier may refer to:

== People ==
- Xavier (surname)
- Xavier (given name)
- Xavier (footballer, born January 1980), Brazilian midfielder Anderson Conceição Xavier
- Xavier (footballer, born 2000), Brazilian midfielder João Vitor Xavier de Almeida
- Xavier (wrestler), ring name of American professional wrestler John Jairo Bedoya Jr. (1977–2020)

== Arts and entertainment ==
- Xavier: Renegade Angel, an animated TV series
- Xavier Institute, a fictional school in Marvel comics
- Charles Xavier, Professor X, a fictional Marvel Comics character
- "Xavier", a song by Casseurs Flowters from the 2015 soundtrack album Comment c'est loin
- "Xavier", a song by Dead Can Dance from the 1987 album Within the Realm of a Dying Sun
- Xavier (album), by Xaviersobased, 2026

== Universities ==
- Xavier University, Cincinnati, U.S.
- Xavier University of Louisiana, New Orleans, U.S.

== Other uses ==
- Xavier, Spain, a town and municipality
- Xavier Uncle, a Twitter account
- Tropical Storm Xavier, the name of several storms
- Drive PX Xavier, an Nvidia Drive
- Tegra#Xavier, a system on a chip

== See also ==
- St. Francis Xavier (disambiguation)
- St. Xavier (disambiguation)
- Javier (disambiguation)
- Zavier, a list of people with the given name
- Zavier (album), by Fetty Wap, 2026
