= Javier (surname) =

Javier is a surname of the following notable people:

== Athletes ==
- Al Javier (born 1954) Dominican baseball outfielder
- Beethoven Javier (1947 – 2017), Uruguayan football player and coach
- Chris Javier (born 1992), Filipino basketball player
- Cristian Javier (born 1997), Dominican baseball pitcher for the Houston Astros
- Julián Javier (born 1936), Dominican baseball second baseman
- Kristian Javier (born 1996) American soccer player
- Nelson Javier (born 1985), Dominican badminton player
- Stan Javier (born 1964), Dominican baseball outfielder

== Letters ==
- Daniel Falcon Javier, Filipino teacher
- Emil Q. Javier (born 1940), Filipino academic

== Politicians ==
- Evelio Javier (1942–1986), Filipino politician
- Lolita Javier (born 1975), Filipina politician
- Rogelio Rodríguez Javier (born 1958), Mexican politician

== Arts ==
- Danny Javier (1947–2022), Filipino entertainer
- Dyords Javier, Filipino entertainer
- Geraldine Javier (born 1970), Filipino artist
- Jovany Javier (born 1987), American entertainer
- Mica Javier (born 1993), Filipina singer

== Other ==
- León de Garro y Javier, Basque nobleman

== See also ==
- Javier (disambiguation)
- Javier (name)
- Amy Lazaro-Javier
