= Xaviera =

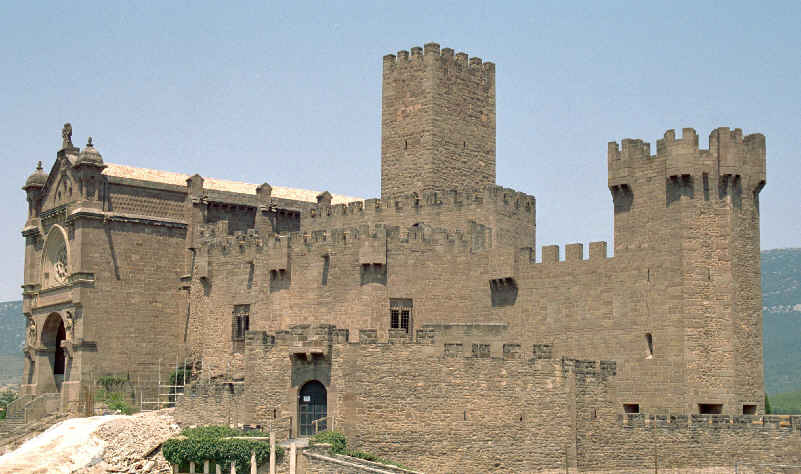
- The castle of Xavier, where Francis Xavier was born, was restored by the Jesuits.
- Gender: Feminine

Origin
- Origin: Catholic Church
- Meaning: a place called "castle" or "new house" in Basque language

Other names
- Related names: Xavier, Javiera, Xavi, Xavia, Xaviell, Xaviero, Xever, Xabier, Zavia, Zavier

The given name Xaviera (/zeɪviˈɛərə, seɪ-/, Catalan: [ʃəβiˈeɾə, ʃaviˈeɾa], Galician: [ʃaˈβjeɾɐ], Portuguese: [ʃɐviˈɛɾɐ]; French: Xavière [ɡzavjɛʁ]; Spanish: Javiera [xaˈβjeɾa]; Basque: Xabiera [ʃaβieɾa]) is a feminine form of Xavier, both derived from the 16th-century Roman Catholic Saint Francis Xavier.

== People ==
- Xaviera Hollander (b. 1943), Indonesian call girl, madam, and author
- Xaviera Jessurun, Surinamese activist
- Xaviera Simmons (b. 1974), American contemporary artist
- Xaviera Gold, American singer, DJ, and mixer
