= Javier =

Javier may refer to:

== Arts, entertainment, and media ==
- Javier, in video game Advance Wars: Dual Strike
- Javier Rios, a character in the Monsters, Inc. franchise.
- Javier (album), a 2003 album by the American singer Javier Colon, known as Javier

== People ==
- Javier (name)

== Places ==
- Javier, Spain
- Javier, Leyte, Philippines

== See also ==
- Hurricane Javier (disambiguation)
- San Javier (disambiguation)
- Xavier (disambiguation)
- Xavier (given name)
- Xavier (surname)
