= Daniel Javier =

Daniel Javier may refer to:

- Daniel Falcon Javier, Filipino educator
- Danny Javier (1947–2022), Filipino singer, musician, actor, distant relative of Daniel Falcon Javier
