= Mauricio Villardo =

Brazilian martial artist

- Born: Rio de Janeiro, Brazil
- Style: Gracie Jiu-Jitsu
- Teacher: Royler Gracie,
- Rank: 6th Degree Black Belt

Other information
- Website: http://www.brjj.com

Mauricio Villardo Reis (born January 14, 1975) is best known as Mauricio Villardo. Professor Villardo is a Master Instructor and practitioner of Brazilian Jiu-Jitsu. He holds a sixth-degree black belt in Brazilian Jiu-Jitsu from Royler Gracie, the head instructor of Gracie Humaitá. Mauricio is also a former World Champion of the World Jiu-Jitsu Championship held by the International Brazilian Jiu-Jitsu Federation (IBJJF).

Living close to the beautiful beaches in Brazil, Mauricio's hobby was surfing, but once he experienced Jiu-Jitsu, he fell in love with the sport. Mauricio's first experience with the martial arts was not Jiu-Jitsu. When he was seven, he began practicing Judo at Clube do Flamengo, in Rio de Janeiro. At the age of fifteen, Mauricio began to practice Muay Thai. A few months later, a friend invited him to visit a Brazilian Jiu-Jitsu academy, and for Mauricio, it began a lifelong journey studying the world's most effective fighting and self-defense system.

Almost immediately after becoming a Jiu-Jitsu student, Mauricio began to compete at local and regional tournaments in Brazil. Later, he began to assist Professor Royler Gracie with classes, developing his passion for teaching. He won many major tournaments including the 1996 World Jiu-Jitsu Championship. In 1997, Mauricio accomplished a lifelong dream, receiving his black belt from the hands of his professor, Royler Gracie.

In 2002 Mauricio moved to south Florida. Recognizing the opportunity to build a small business in the United States, he decided to continue teaching his style of Jiu-Jitsu in the Palm Beach County, Florida area. Since 2002, Mauricio has been developing and expanding Brazilian Jiu-Jitsu in the West Palm Beach area where he lives and operates an academy in Wellington.

With an expanding academy, Professor Villardo has also continued his success in competition. In 2009 he won a silver medal at the IBJJF PAN Championships in California. He also won gold medals at the IBJJF 2009 and 2010 PAN No-Gi championships in New York City.

== Instructor lineage ==
Mitsuo "Count Koma" Maeda → Carlos Gracie Sr. → Hélio Gracie → Royler Gracie
