= Jessurun =

Jessurun is a name.

== People with the name ==
- Realdo Jessurun
- Samuel Jessurun de Mesquita
- Winston Jessurun
- Xaviera Jessurun
- Jessurun Cardozo
- Jessrun Oppenheimer

== See also ==
- Jeshurun
