= List of defunct airlines of Suriname =

This is a list of defunct airlines of Suriname.

Airline	Image	IATA	ICAO	Callsign	Commenced operations	Ceased operations	Notes
Caricom Airways			CRB	CARIBBEAN COMMUTER	2004	2018	Owners moved to Curacao with some of the fleet to start up Dutch Caribbean Islandhopper
Gonini Air Services		5Z	GON	GONINI	1978	1994	Moved some of its operations to the Dutch Antilles and USA with American registered aircraft till the end of the 1990s
Hi-Jet Helicopter Services			HHS	HIJET	1997	2017	After declaring bankruptcy in December 2017, Hi-Jet Helicopter Services made a modest re-start by the end of 2018
Inter Tropical Aviation			TCU	TROPAIR	1987	2001	
Kuyake Aviation					2004	2018	Part of Caricom Airways Flight Academy, owners moved to Curacao with some of the fleet to start up Dutch Caribbean Islandhopper
Nickerie Air Spray							Air Crop-Dusters which were active in the rice region of Nickerie, Suriname
Pont International Airline Services			PSI	PONT			
Skyliners Air Services			LNR	LINERSERVICE			
SLM		PY	SLM	SURINAM	1962	1975	Renamed/merged to Surinam Airways
Surinaamse Luchtvracht Onderneming - SLO					1969	1973	Renamed/merged to Surinam Air Cargo
Surinam Air Cargo				SURNAMAIR	1973	1974	Renamed/merged to Surinam Air Transport. In 1992 a new company with the same name Surinam Air Cargo emerged as a transport company of parcels between Suriname and the Netherlands, this is not an airline company.
Surinam Air Spray/Surinaamse Luchtvaart Bespuitings Maatschappij					1964		Air Crop-Dusters which were active in the agriculture regions of Nickerie, Coronie and Saramacca in Suriname
Surinam Air Transport					1974	1974	
Surinam International Victory Airline			SWO	SIVA	2004	2005	Defunct immediately after being announced, even before official launch
Trans Caribbean Airlines					1990	1991	

== See also ==
- List of airlines of Suriname
- List of airports in Suriname
