= Javy =

Javy is a shortened nickname for the masculine given name Javier. Notable persons referred to as Javy include:

- Javy Ayala (born 1988), American martial artist
- Javy Báez (born 1992), Puerto Rican baseball infielder
- Javy López (born 1970), Puerto Rican baseball catcher
- Javy Guerra (2010s pitcher) (born 1985), American baseball pitcher
- Javy Guerra (2020s pitcher) (born 1995), Panamanian baseball pitcher and former shortstop
- Javy Vázquez (born 1976), Puerto Rican baseball pitcher

== See also ==
- Javi (disambiguation)
- JV (disambiguation)
