= Saverio =

Saverio is a given name of Italian origin. It is a cognate of Xavier and Javier, both of which originate from Xabier, the Basque name for the Spanish town Javier. Xabier is itself the romanization of etxe berri meaning "new house" or "new home".

== People ==
Given name

- Sav Rocca (Saverio Giovanni Rocca) (born 1973), Australian professional American football player in the USA
- Saverio Bettinelli (1718–1808), Italian writer
- Saverio Costanzo (born 1975), Italian film director
- Saverio Fava (1832–1913), first Italian ambassador to the USA
- Saverio Gandini (1729–1796), Italian painter of the late-Baroque and Neoclassic periods
- Saverio Indrio (1963–2025), Italian voice actor
- Saverio Mammoliti (born 1942), Italian 'Ndrangheta boss from Oppido Mamertina and Castellace in Calabria
- Saverio Mercadante (1795–1870), Italian composer
- Savério Romano (born 1925), Brazilian footballer

Middle name

- Francesco Saverio Romano (born 1964), Italian politician and lawyer
