= Claudia Elizabeth Bojórquez =

Mexican politician

- Born: 19 October 1970 (age 55); Tenosique, Tabasco, Mexico
- Occupation: Politician
- Political party: PRD

Claudia Elizabeth Bojórquez Javier (Note: In this Mexican name, the surname is Bojórquez and the second or maternal family name is Javier.) (born 19 October 1970) is a Mexican politician affiliated with the Party of the Democratic Revolution (PRD). In the 2012 general election she was elected to the Chamber of Deputies to represent Tabasco's 1st district during the 62nd session of Congress.
