= Bohórquez =

Bohórquez or Bohorquez is a surname. Notable people with the surname include:

- Abigael Bohórquez (1936–1995), Mexican playwright
- Argemiro Bohórquez (born 1960), Colombian cyclist
- Edith, Merylin and Mercedes Bohorquez, founders of the French women's football team now known as GPSO 92 Issy
- Hernando Bohórquez (born 1992), Colombian cyclist
- José Álvarez de Bohórquez (1897–1993), Spanish horse rider
- Juan Bartolomé de Bohorquez e Hinojosa (1542–1633), Roman Catholic prelate
- Juan Lozano Bohórquez (born 1955), Spanish footballer
- Luis Fernando Bohórquez, Colombian actor
- María de Bohórquez (1539–1559), Spanish Protestant martyr
- Pedro Bohórquez (1602–1667), Spanish adventurer
- Ximena Bohórquez (born 1956), Ecuadorian physician and politician

== See also ==
- Bojórquez
