= Javi =

Javi may refer to:

- Javi, a hypocorism for the given name Javier
  - Javi García (born 1987), Spanish footballer
  - Javi Martínez (born 1988), Spanish footballer
  - Javi Elizonndro, a character on the TV series Ozark
- Jowzar-e Javid, a village in Fars Province, Iran
