= Zavier =

Zavier is a masculine given name, a spelling variant of Xavier, which may refer to:

- Zavier Gozo (born 2007), American soccer player
- Zavier Lucero (born 1999), Filipino-American basketball player in the Philippine Basketball Association
- Zavier Massiah-Edwards (born 2007), English footballer
- Zavier Simpson (born 1997), American professional basketball player in the Chinese Basketball Association

== See also ==
- Xavier (disambiguation)
