= Bojórquez =

Bojórquez or Bojorquez is a surname. Notable people with the surname include:

- Carlos Bojorquez (born 1972), Mexican professional boxer
- Charles Bojórquez (born 1949), American graffiti artist and painter
- Claudia Elizabeth Bojórquez (born 1970), Mexican politician
- Corey Bojorquez (born 1996), American football player
- Denzell García Bojórquez (born 2003), Mexican footballer
- Francisco Bojórquez Mungaray (born 1935), Mexican politician
- Ramón Bojórquez Salcido (born 1961), Mexican spree killer
- Rolando Bojórquez Gutiérrez (1967–2013), Mexican politician

== See also ==
- Bohórquez
- Bojórquez, a neighborhood in Mérida, Yucatán
