= Xavier (surname) =

Xavier (/ˈzeɪviər, ˈseɪ-, ˈzævieɪ/, Catalan: [ʃəβiˈe, ʃaviˈeɾ], Galician: [ʃaˈβjeɾ], Portuguese: [ʃɐviˈɛɾ], French: [gzavje]; Spanish: Javier [xaˈβjeɾ]; Basque: Xabier [ʃaβier]) is a Portuguese surname. Notable people with the surname include:

- Abel Xavier (born 1972), Portuguese footballer
- Anderson Conceição Xavier (born 1980), Brazilian footballer
- Arlene Xavier (born 1969), Brazilian volleyball player
- Asquith Xavier (1920–1980), British Railways worker
- Babi Xavier (born 1974), Brazilian actress, singer and television host
- Cadu Xavier (born 1978), Brazilian politician
- Cleiton Ribeiro Xavier (born 1983), Brazilian footballer
- Chica Xavier (1932–2020), Brazilian actress and producer
- Chico Xavier (1910–2002), Brazilian medium
- Daniel Xavier Mendes (born 2002), Brazilian Paralympic swimmer
- Dezmond Xavier (born 1994), American professional wrestler
- Emanuel Xavier (born 1971), American author and activist
- Filipe Nery Xavier (1801–1875), Goan-Português administrator and historian
- St. Francis Xavier (1506–1552, born as Francisco de Jasso y Azpilicueta), Spanish Roman Catholic saint and co-founder of the Jesuit Order
- Frederico Burgel Xavier (born 1986), Brazilian footballer
- Herve Xavier Zengue known as Xavier (born 1984), Cameroonian footballer
- Irene Xavier, Malaysian women's rights activist
- Jaime Xavier (born 1990), Brazilian footballer
- Jeff Xavier (born 1985), Cape Verdean American basketball player
- John Xavier (1977–2020), stage name of American professional wrestler John Jirus
- Jorge Barreto Xavier (born 1965), Portuguese cultural manager, university professor, and politician
- Leonardo Xavier (born 1976), Brazilian martial artist
- Llewellyn Xavier (born 1945), Saint Lucian artist
- Marcos Ferreira Xavier (born 1982), Brazilian-Azerbaijani footballer
- Margaret Lin Xavier (1898–1932), Thai physician
- Nelson Xavier (1941–2017), Brazilian actor
- Phideaux Xavier (born 1963), American TV director and musician
- S. Xavier (1920–2009), Indian politician

== Fictional ==
- Charles Xavier, founder of the superhero team known as the X-Men, which appear in books published by Marvel Comics.

== See also ==
- Javier (disambiguation)
- Javier (name)
- Xavier (given name)
- John Sevier
