= Javiera =

- Pronunciation: [xaˈβjeɾa]
- Gender: Feminine

Origin
- Origin: Javier, Kingdom of Navarre, today part of Spain
- Meaning: Castle/New House or Bright
- Region of origin: Latin Europe

Other names
- Related names: Xabiera, Xaviera

Javiera (pronounced [xaˈβjeɾa]) is the Spanish spelling of the more rare feminine given name Xaviera. Both names derive from the Catholic saint Francis de Xavier, where Xavier refers to the saint's birthplace.

== People ==
- Javiera Caballero (b. 1978), American politician
- Javiera Carrera (1781–1862), Chilean aristocrat
- Javiera Parra (b. 1968), Chilean musician and singer
- Javiera Contador (b. 1974), Chilean actress, comedian and television host
- Javiera Montes Cruz (1973–2025), Chilean politician
- Javiera Muñoz (1977–2018), Swedish singer with Chilean-Spanish roots
- Javiera Salcedo (b. 1977), Argentine Olympic swimmer
- Javiera Díaz de Valdés (b. 1981), Chilean television actress
- Javiera Mena (b. 1983), Chilean musician

== See also ==
- Xaviera
- Javiera y Los Imposibles, Chilean band led by Javiera Parra
- Liceo Javiera Carrera, Chilean high school
