= Fly All Ways =

Suriname airline company

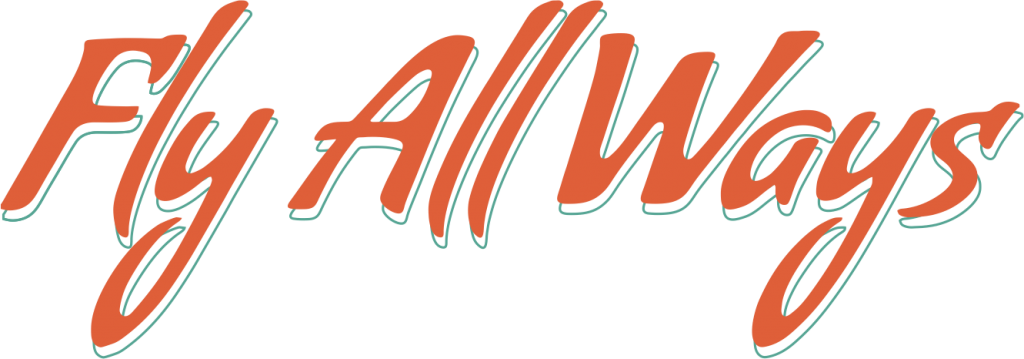
IATA	ICAO	Call sign
8W	EDR	BIRDVIEW
- Founded: 2014
- Commenced operations: January 10, 2016
- Hubs: Johan Adolf Pengel International Airport
- Fleet size: 3
- Destinations: 9
- Headquarters: Paramaribo, Suriname
- Key people: Amichand Jhauw (MD)
- Website: www.flyallways.com

Fly All Ways (legally Fly Always N.V.) is a regional airline of Suriname, based in Paramaribo and started operations on January 10, 2016, with the launch of its inaugural flight above Suriname. Its first commercial flight took place on January 22, 2016, to São Luís, capital of the state of Maranhão in Brazil. On February 5, 2016, this was followed by the first charter flight to Barbados. Later in February 2016, the first flights followed to Curaçao and Sint Maarten. In the same month, Guyana granted the new airline the rights to operate scheduled flights to Guyana with connections to Brazil and the Caribbean. Fly All Ways is planning to fly to several cities in both the Caribbean and South America.

It is on the list of airlines currently banned in the EU.

== Fleet acquisition ==
Blue Wing Airlines, another Suriname airline, entered into a sales agreement with KLM to acquire two ex-KLM cityhopper Fokker 70 jets in early January 2014 and took delivery of PH-KZV (msn 11556) and PH-WXA (11570). PH-KZV was withdrawn from service at Norwich on January 5, 2014, after arriving as KL1515 from Amsterdam. PH-WXA was withdrawn from service at Amsterdam on the morning of March 30, 2014, after arriving as KL1486 from Humberside. The aircraft then positioned Amsterdam – Norwich for maintenance early the same afternoon as KL9955 where both aircraft were being prepared for service. The aircraft were subsequently sold to Fly All Ways, by then a new independent start-up airline offering transport to regional destinations. On November 20, 2014, the first aircraft (PH-WXA) landed at Johan Adolf Pengel International Airport, in the Fly All Ways colours. One month later the second aircraft (PH-KZV) arrived in Suriname. These two are now registered as PZ-TFB and PZ-TFA respectively, in Suriname and stationed at the Johan Adolf Pengel International Airport where a new hangar was built. In December 2024 the airline welcomed a new Airbus A320.

== Transition from regular schedule to charter ==
The airline, which has mainly flown between Suriname, Guyana, and Barbados, suspended its regular flights to reschedule its operations. Although the Suriname base airlines suspend regular flights on January 15, 2017, charter flights are still available. The airline's CEO also said it plans to base the airline in Guyana. However, a confirmed time has not yet been set to restart regular service.

== Destinations ==
Fly All Ways serves the following cities:

Country	City	Airport	Notes	Refs
Barbados	Bridgetown	Grantley Adams International Airport	Terminated	
Brazil	Belém	Belém/Val-de-Cans International Airport	Terminated	
Cuba	Camagüey	Ignacio Agramonte International Airport		
Cuba	Havana	José Martí International Airport		
Cuba	Santiago de Cuba	Antonio Maceo Airport		
Curaçao	Willemstad	Curaçao International Airport		
Dominican Republic	Santo Domingo	Las Américas International Airport		
Guyana	Georgetown	Cheddi Jagan International Airport		
Haiti	Port-au-Prince	Toussaint Louverture International Airport	Terminated	
Jamaica	Kingston	Norman Manley International Airport	Terminated	
Sint Maarten	Philipsburg	Princess Juliana International Airport	Seasonal	
Suriname	Paramaribo	Johan Adolf Pengel International Airport	Hub	
Venezuela	Caracas	Simón Bolívar International Airport	Terminated	

== Fleet ==
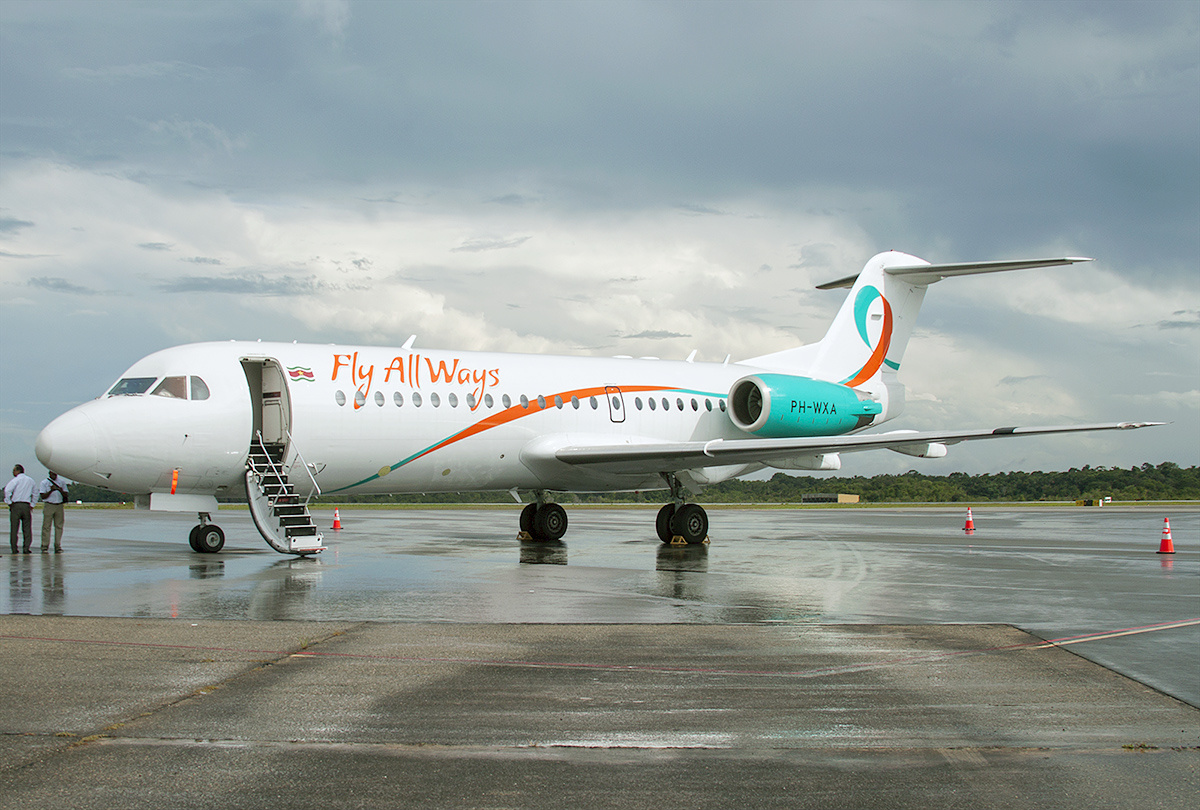
Fly All Ways Fokker 70 at Paramaribo Airport in 2014

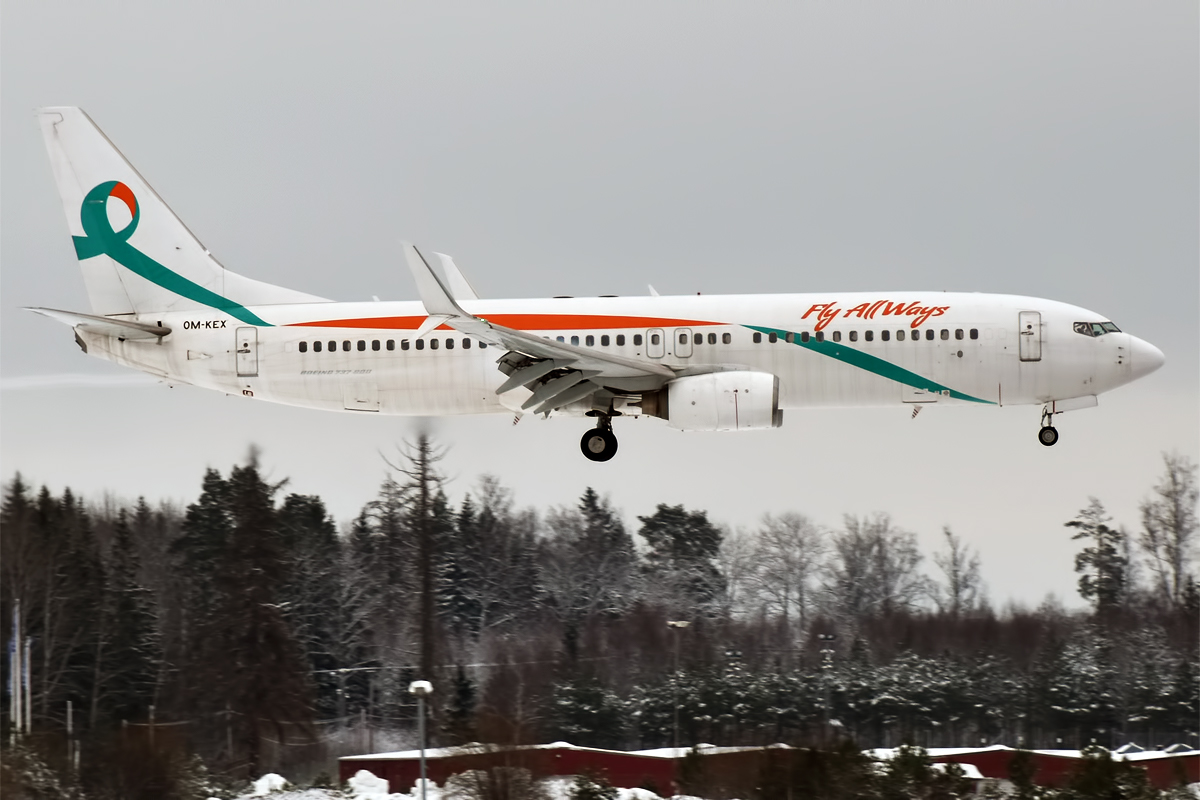
Fly All Ways Boeing 737-800 at Stockholm Arlanda Airport in 2021

=== Current fleet ===
As of August 2025, Fly All Ways operates the following aircraft:

Aircraft	In service	Orders	Passengers	Notes
Fokker 70	3	—	80	
Airbus A320-200	—	1	150~	To be introduced.
Total	3	1		

== See also ==
- List of airlines of Suriname
