= List of airlines of Suriname =

This is a list of active airlines which have an Air Operator Certificate issued by the Civil Aviation Safety Authority Suriname - CASAS of Suriname.

All of the airlines have been banned from flying into the EU since June 2025.

Airline	Image	IATA	ICAO	Callsign	Hub airport(s)	Notes
Blue Wing Airlines (BWI)			BWI	BLUETAIL	Zorg en Hoop Airport	Domestic airline, commercial
Fly All Ways (FAW)		8W	EDR	BIRDVIEW	Johan Adolf Pengel International Airport	Regional airline
Gum Air (GUM)			GUM	GUMAIR	Zorg en Hoop Airport	Domestic airline, commercial
MAF Suriname (MAF)					Zorg en Hoop Airport	Missionary, Medevac, Commercial
Surinam Airways (SLM)		PY	SLM	SURINAM	Johan Adolf Pengel International Airport	National airline, commercial
United Aviation Services (UAS)					Zorg en Hoop Airport	Airplane Charter, Helicopter Charter, Helicopter EMS
Vortex Air Services (VAS)					Zorg en Hoop Airport	Airplane Charter, Helicopter Charter

This is a list of active non-commercial operators in Suriname.

Airline	IATA	ICAO	Callsign	Hub Airport(s)	Notes
Aeroclub Suriname(ACS)				Zorg en Hoop Airport	Aero Club
Badjas Airlines				Johan Adolf Pengel International Airport	Air cargo
Coronie Aero Farming (CAF)				Totness Airstrip	Air Crop-Dusters
Eagle Air Services (EAS)				Nickerie Major Fernandes Airfield	Air Crop-Dusters
ERK Farms (ERK)				Nickerie Major Fernandes Airfield	Air Crop-Dusters
Overeem Air Service (OAS)				Wageningen Airstrip	Air Crop-Dusters
Pegasus Air Services (PAS)				Zorg en Hoop Airport	Helicopter Charter Company
Surinam Sky Farmers (SSF)				Wageningen Airstrip	Air Crop-Dusters

== See also ==
- List of defunct airlines of Suriname
- List of airlines
