= Xavier Armange =

French writer and illustrator of children's books

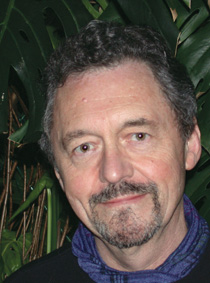
- Born: 17 June 1947; Nantes, France
- Occupations: Writer, illustrator, photographer, publisher
- Writing career
- Genres: Children's Books, Graphic novels

Xavier Armange (born 17 June 1947 in Nantes) is a French writer and illustrator of children's books.

== Career ==
After studying literature, he worked in the communications industry and created an advertising agency, while at the same time embarking on a career of writing and illustrating children's books. He has written more than twenty books and albums and also writes in the children's press. In 1995 he established a publishing house in Les Sables-d'Olonne which publishes a dozen books per year.

== Bibliography ==
(English language only)

- Find-a-Word in the City
- Find-a-Word in the Country
- Find-a-Word on Vacation

American edition Derrydale Books, New York City
