= Surinam Airways =

Flag carrier of Suriname

Surinam Airways Surinaamse Luchtvaart Maatschappij

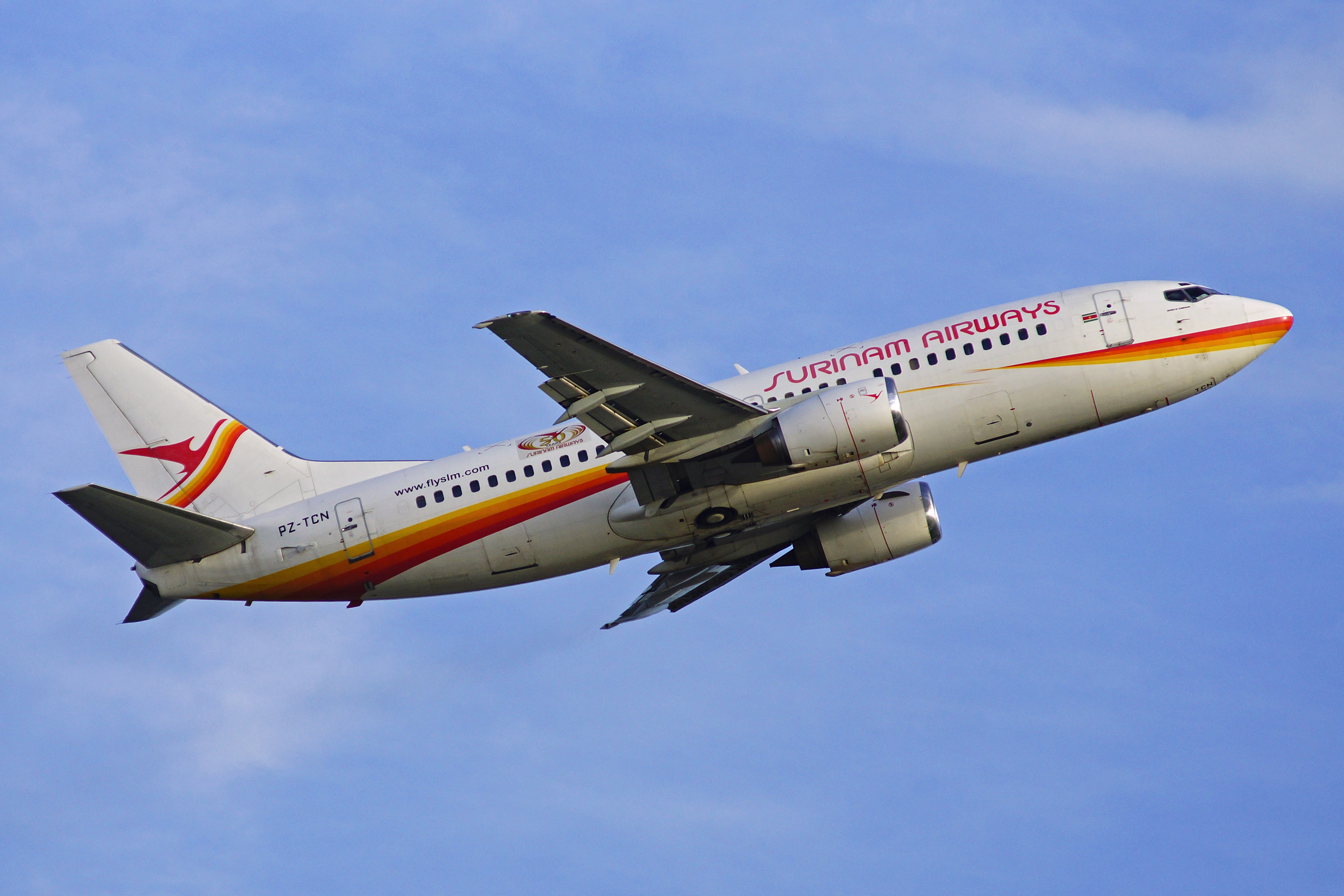
- Boeing 737-300
| IATA | ICAO | Call sign |
|---|---|---|
| PY | SLM | SURINAM |
- Founded: 1953; 73 years ago
- Commenced operations: 1955; 71 years ago
- Hubs: Johan Adolf Pengel International Airport
- Frequent-flyer program: Loyal Wings
- Fleet size: 2
- Destinations: 5
- Parent company: Government of Suriname
- Headquarters: Paramaribo, Suriname
- Employees: 500
- Website: www.flyslm.com

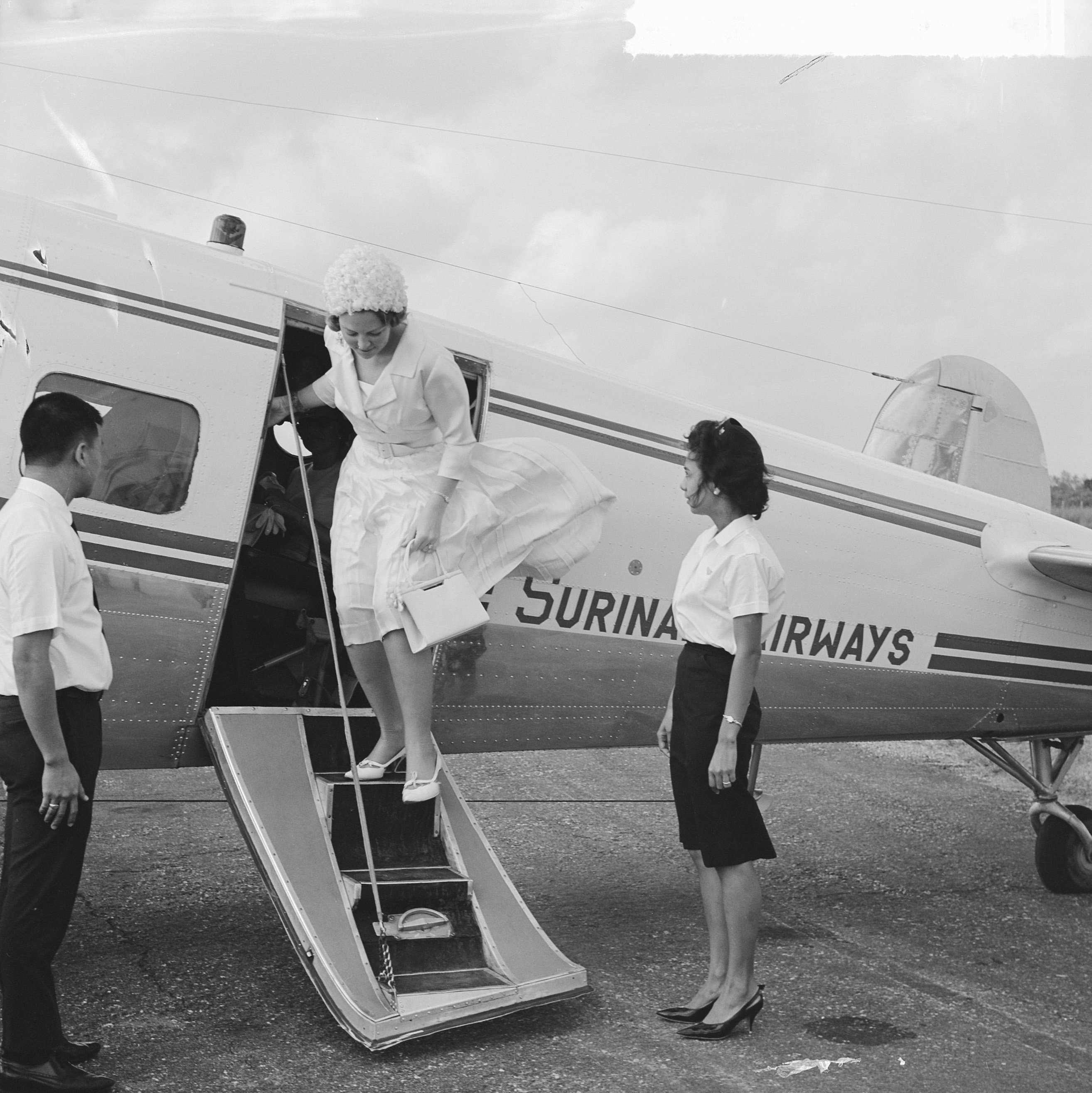
Princess Beatrix of the Netherlands de-boarding a light aircraft in 1965.

Surinam Airways (Dutch: Surinaamse Luchtvaart Maatschappij), also known by its initials SLM, is the flag carrier of Suriname, based in the capital city Paramaribo. It operates regional and long-haul scheduled passenger services. Its hub is at Johan Adolf Pengel International Airport (Zanderij). Surinam Airways is wholly owned by the Government of Suriname.

== History ==
=== Foundation and early years ===
The airline was established in 1953 by private entrepreneurs Rudi Kappel and Herman van Eyck as the Kappel-Van Eyck Aviation Company (Dutch: Luchtvaartbedrijf Kappel-Van Eyck), aimed at operating feeder flights from a domestic network. Scheduled operations started with two Cessna 170Bs in January 1955 with domestic flights between Paramaribo and Moengo. From 1955 until 2005 Surinam Airways operated an extensive domestic network.

On 30 August 1962, the company was purchased from Herman van Eyck by the Surinamese government and renamed Surinam Airways, or SLM – Surinaamse Luchtvaart Maatschappij in Dutch. The logo of Surinam Airways depicts a 'Sabaku', which is a Surinamese word for cattle egret. From 1964 Surinam Airways started scheduled international operations to Curaçao together with ALM Antillean Airlines.

Upon the country's independence in November 1975, the carrier was appointed as the national airline of the Republic of Suriname; it also started services to Amsterdam using a Douglas DC-8-63 that was leased from KLM. Services to Curaçao, French Guiana, Guyana, and Trinidad and Tobago were flown in a pool agreement with ALM and KLM.

In March 1980, the carrier had 400 employees. At this time, the fleet consisted of a Douglas DC-8-63, a Douglas DC-8-50CF and three Twin Otters. It operated international routes to Amsterdam, Belém, Curacao, Georgetown, Manaus, Miami and Panama City, and domestic services to Apoera, Avanavero, Bakhuys, Djoemoe, Ladouanie, Moengo and Nieuw Nickerie. In 1983 the regional routes were flown with a Boeing 737-200 (registration OY-APR) leased from Maersk Air (named 'Tjon Tjon'). The transatlantic route was flown with DC-8s leased from Arrow Air, DC-8-62 registered N1806 and also DC-8-63, registered N4935C, named 'Stanvaste'. From May 1993 until April 1999 a DHC-8-300 Dash 8 (registration: N106AV) was used on the regional routes.

On 7 June 1989, a Douglas DC-8-62 (registration: N1809E, first named Fajalobi, later re-christened Anthony Nesty crashed on approach to Zanderij Airport, killing 175 occupants on board.

=== Development since 2000 ===
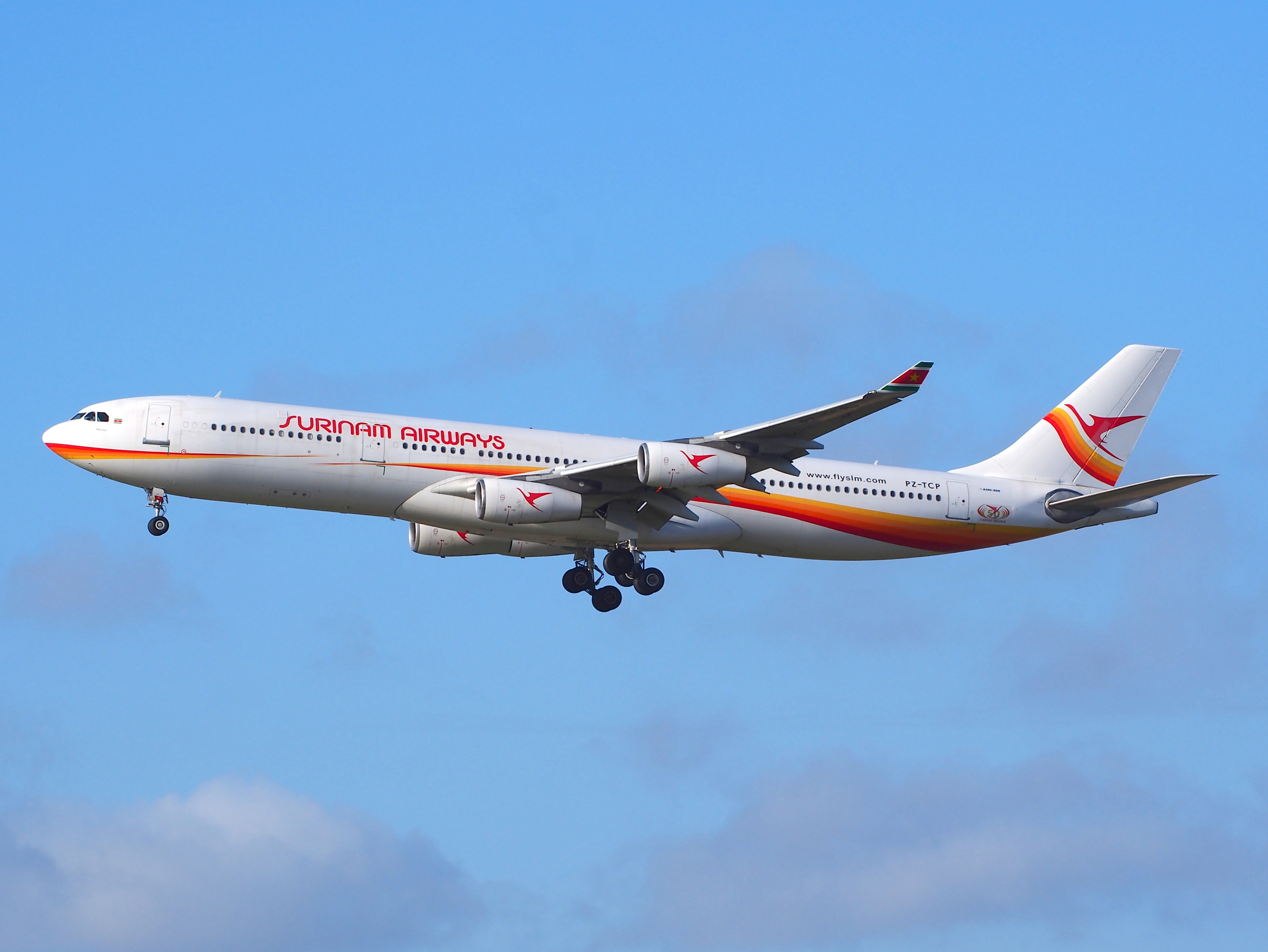
A Surinam Airways Airbus A340-300 in 2014.

At March 2000, the airline had 543 employees.

From August 2004 until the end of 2009 Surinam Airways operated a Boeing 747-300 (PZ-TCM, named 'Ronald Elwin Kappel'), which was purchased from KLM. It was replaced with a 317-seater Airbus A340-300 (PZ-TCP, named Palulu) and later another younger A340-300 (registration: PZ-TCR). In early 2009, Surinam Airways ordered two Boeing 737-300s (PZ-TCN, named District of Commewijne and PZ-TCO, named District of Marrowijne to replace its McDonnell Douglas MD-82s. In 2014, it was announced that the airline would acquire another wide-body aircraft to complement its Airbus A340-300 on international services. A Boeing 737-700 (PZ-TCS, named 'District of Saramacca') was leased from DAE Capital and arrived on 30 April 2018 in Suriname and became operational in May 2018, this plane was formerly flown by Air China.

From December 2019, a Boeing 777-200ER was leased from Boeing Capital to replace the Airbus A340-300 previously used on the Paramaribo – Amsterdam route. The aircraft was registered PZ-TCU, named 'Bird of the Green Paradise' with a special livery and performed its first commercial ETOPS flight in December 2020. Due to the COVID-19 pandemic and possible high maintenance costs the B777 was returned in March 2021. It was parked for a while in Victorville. Now Boeing is using this aircraft as its new ecoDemonstrator.

On June 3, 2025, Surinam Airways was included in the List of airlines banned in the European Union with all other Surinamese airlines.

== Corporate affairs ==
At one time the company had its head office at Mr. Jagernath Lachmonstraat 136.

As of June 2013, Surinam Airways was the owner of both the only terminal in Zanderij Airport and the only ground handling company in that airport.

On 16 April 2021, the Surinamese Government, during the SLM General Meeting of shareholders, appointed Dutchman Paul de Haan as the new chief executive officer (CEO) of Surinam Airways (SLM). In January 2022 Xaviera Jessurun was appointed by the Government as chairman of the board of the SLM. On 9 April 2022, Frenchman Yves Guibert was appointed as the new senior vice president operations. In July 2022 the management of Surinam Airways announced the company would dry lease a Boeing 737-800 for its regional routes in order to reduce its Monthly expenditure. The financially troubled Surinamese airline will use government owned gold company's Grassalco's gold stock as cover for financing facility converted into a term deposit for the SLM recovery plan. "The recovery plan is based on a formulated business plan, in which the revenues for the coming period are projected, based on the planned operations. With a thorough implementation of the recovery plan, it is assumed that no claim will have to be made to the coverage provided," the senior management of the company reports on 25 July 2022.

== Destinations ==
Surinam Airways operates scheduled services to the following destinations, as of April 2019. Terminated destinations are also listed.

| Country | City | Airport | Notes | Refs |
|---|---|---|---|---|
| Aruba | Oranjestad | Queen Beatrix International Airport | — | |
| Barbados | Bridgetown | Grantley Adams International Airport | | |
| Brazil | Belém | Val de Cães International Airport | — | |
| Curaçao | Willemstad | Hato International Airport | — | |
| France, French Guiana | Cayenne | Cayenne – Félix Eboué Airport | Terminated | |
| Guyana | Georgetown | Cheddi Jagan International Airport | — | |
| Haiti | Port-au-Prince | Toussaint Louverture International Airport | Terminated | |
| Netherlands | Amsterdam | Amsterdam Airport Schiphol | — | |
| Suriname | Avanavero | Avanavero Airstrip | Terminated | |
| Suriname | Bakhuys | Bakhuys Airstrip | Terminated | |
| Suriname | Djoemoe | Djoemoe Airstrip | Terminated | |
| Suriname | Aurora | Laduani Airstrip | Terminated | |
| Suriname | Moengo | Moengo Airstrip | Terminated | |
| Suriname | Nieuw Nickerie | Major Henk Fernandes Airport | Terminated | |
| Suriname | Paramaribo | Johan Adolf Pengel International Airport | Hub | |
| Suriname | Paramaribo | Zorg en Hoop Airport | Terminated | |
| Suriname | Stoelmanseiland | Stoelmans Eiland Airstrip | Terminated | |
| Suriname | Washabo | Washabo Airport | Terminated | |
| Trinidad and Tobago | Port of Spain | Piarco International Airport | Terminated | |
| United States | Miami | Miami International Airport | — | |
| United States | Orlando | Orlando Sanford International Airport | Terminated | |

=== Codeshare agreements ===
- Winair

=== Interline agreements ===
- APG Airlines

== Fleet ==
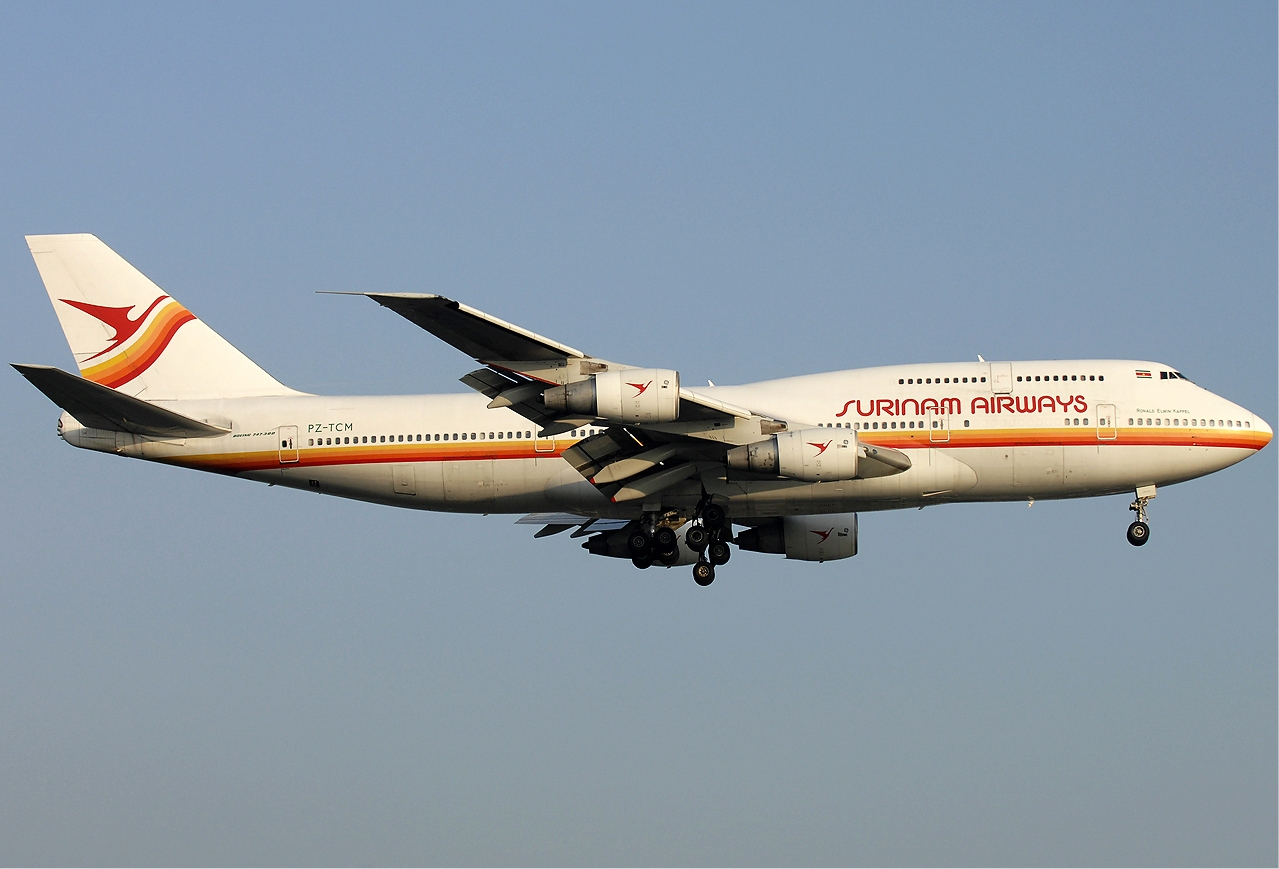
A Surinam Airways Boeing 747-300 in 2009.

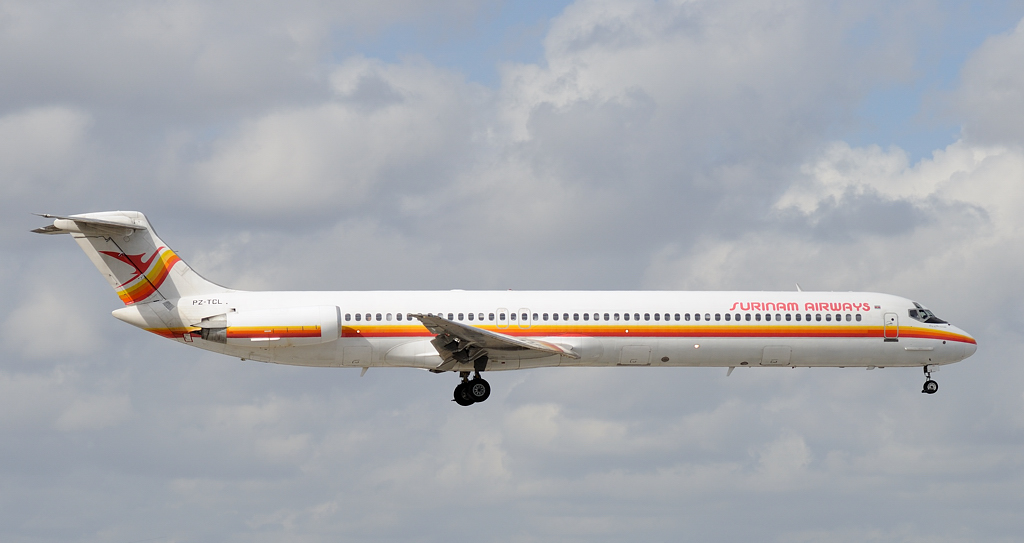
A Surinam Airways McDonnell Douglas MD-82 in 2009.

=== Current fleet ===
As of August 2025, Surinam Airways operates the following aircraft:

Surinam Airways Fleet
| Aircraft | In service | Orders | Passengers | | | Notes |
| Aircraft | In service | Orders | J | Y | Total | Notes |
|---|---|---|---|---|---|---|
| Boeing 737-800 | 2 | — | 12 | 138 | 150 | |
| Total | 2 | — | | | | |

Additionally, Surinam Airways leases additional aircraft to operate its sole long-haul route; as of early 2025 an Airbus A340-600 is in service.

=== Historic fleet ===
Surinam Airways operated the following aircraft throughout its history:

- Airbus A330-200
- Airbus A340-300
- Beech G-18S
- Bell 47G Helicopter
- Boeing 707-320C
- Boeing 737-200
- Boeing 737-300
- Boeing 737-700
- Boeing 747-200B
- Boeing 747-300SCD
- Boeing 777-200ER
- Cessna UC-78C Bobcat
- Cessna 170B
- Cessna 206
- de Havilland Canada Dash 8-300
- Douglas C-47A
- Douglas C-47B
- Douglas DC-6A
- Douglas DC-6B
- Douglas DC-8-50F
- Douglas DC-8-63
- McDonnell Douglas DC-9-50
- McDonnell Douglas MD-80
- Piper PA-18 Super Cub
- Piper PA-23-160 Apache E
- Twin Otter

== Accidents and incidents ==
- On 5 May 1978, a Douglas DC-6 from the Surinaamse Luchtvaart Maatschappij, registered N3493F, was damaged beyond repair while landing at Paramaribo-Zanderij International Airport on a cargo flight from Curaçao Hato International Airport. All three occupants survived.
- On 7 June 1989, Flight 764, a US-registered Douglas DC-8, crashed 3 kilometres (1.9 mi) west of Zanderij Airport while on approach due to a pilot error. Out of 187 occupants on board, only 11 people survived the accident. The flight remains the worst in Suriname's history.

== See also ==
- List of airlines of Suriname
- Transport in Suriname
