= Leonardo Xavier =

Brazilian martial artist (born 1976)

Professor Leonardo "The Wizard" Xavier was born on January 3, 1976, in Rio de Janeiro, Brazil. At the age of 5, Leo ventured into his first martial art, taking judo in school. At the age of 13 Leo began to take Tae Kwon Do classes. Finally, at the age of 15 a friend introduced him to Brazilian jiu-jitsu.

Leo immediately became good friends with his coaches, Royler Gracie and Saulo Ribeiro. Under their watchful eye, Leo began to successfully compete in local and regional tournaments in Brazil and, while he was still a blue belt, Leo began to help with classes. Leo trained during this time at the legendary birthplace of Gracie Jiu-Jitsu, Gracie Humaitá Academy in Rio. In 1999, Leo realized his dream of being promoted to black belt from the hands of his coaches Royler Gracie and Saulo Ribeiro. He is one of an elite group who have had the privilege and honor of teaching Jiu-Jitsu at the Gracie Humaitá Academy.

In May, 2008, Professor Xavier was promoted by Royler Gracie to the rank of third degree black belt in Gracie Jiu-Jitsu.

He is currently (2014) a 4th degree promoted by Rickson Gracie and recognized by Jiu-Jitsu Global Federation (JJGF).

== Lineage ==
Mitsuyo Maeda (前田光世) → Carlos Gracie Sr. → Hélio Gracie → Royler and Rickson Gracie → Leonardo Xavier

== Accomplishments in the Art of Brazilian Jiu-Jitsu ==
- Multiple Medals at the World Jiu-Jitsu Championship (including 2 bronze at black belt)
- 2006 Pan-American Games Champion (Masters Black Belt Featherweight)
- Two Time Brazilian National Champion
- Multiple Time Rio de Janeiro State Champion
- Instructor of many International and Pan American BJJ Champions
- Instructor of the 2005 International Grappling Festival Overall Team Champion
- Instructor of the 2006 Elite Grapplers Championship Overall Team Champion
- Instructor of the 2006 GC Championship Overall Team Champion
- Instructor of the 2009 Two-time North American Grappling Association (NAGA) Overall team champion
- Texas Police and Fire Games Grappling Champion Instructor
- Defense Tactics Instructor of The Sugar Land Police Department
- International Brazilian jiu-jitsu Federation Certified Referee
- World Class Referee

Leo is also considered a World Class Referee of Brazilian jiu-jitsu and Submission Wrestling.

== Relocation to the United States ==
In 2000, Professor Xavier traveled to the United States to give several seminars. He liked the United States, and started to travel often to the US teaching the art that he loves. In 2003, Leo realized that he loved teaching his style of Jiu-Jitsu to the American people and moved to United States. Leo now intends to remain in the United States to continue his work and efforts to develop Jiu-Jitsu in the United States. Leo is currently developing and expanding Gracie Jiu-Jitsu in Sugar Land, Texas (Houston Area), where he lives and operates the LX Jiu-Jitsu School.

He is a Jiu-Jitsu instructor with over 20 years of experience who teaches seminars and courses internationally.

He combined a deep knowledge of the art with a passion for teaching, and attracted students from around the world.
