= Xavier de Magallon =

French poet, translator and politician

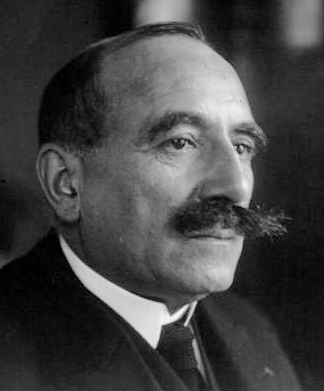
- Xavier de Magallon in 1920
- Born: Xavier, Joseph, Frédéric, Guillaume de Magallon d'Agens; April 2, 1866; Marseille, Bouches-du-Rhône, Provence-Alpes-Côte d'Azur, France
- Died: September 6, 1956 (aged 90); Marseille, Bouches-du-Rhône, Provence-Alpes-Côte d'Azur, France
- Occupations: Poet, translator, politician

Xavier de Magallon (1866–1956) was a French poet, translator and politician.

== Early life ==
Xavier de Magallon d'Agens was born in Marseille, Provence, France on April 2, 1866. During World War I, he volunteered to serve in the French Army. He received the Croix de Guerre for his service.

== Career ==
De Magallon served as a member of the Chamber of Deputies from 1919 to 1924, representing Hérault. He ran as a property owner and defended free enterprise. He believed in harmony between business and labour.

De Magallon was a poet whose work was published in literary journals. He also translated texts from Latin into French. For example, he translated Virgil's Eclogues in 1943.

De Magallon has been described as a "Catholic populist".

== Death ==
De Magallon died in 1956 in Marseille.
