= Jowzar-e Javid =

Jowzar-e Javid جوزارجاويد
- Village
- Location within Iran
- Coordinates: 30°18′25″N 51°37′32″E
- Country: Iran
- Province: Fars
- County: Mamasani
- Bakhsh: Central
- Rural District: Jowzar

Population (2006)
  - Total: 424
- Time zone: UTC+3:30 (IRST)
  - Summer (DST): UTC+4:30 (IRDT)

Jowzar-e Javid (Persian: جوزارجاويد, also Romanized as Jowzār-e Jāvīd, Jow Zār Jāvīd, Jūzār-e Jāvīd, and Jūzār Jāvīd; also known as Jāveh, Jāvi, Jāvīd, and Jowzār) is a village in Jowzar Rural District, in the Central District of Mamasani County, Fars province, Iran. At the 2006 census, its population was 424, in 115 families.
