= Romanzado =

Municipality in Navarre, Spain

Coordinates: 42°40′31″N 1°26′59″W

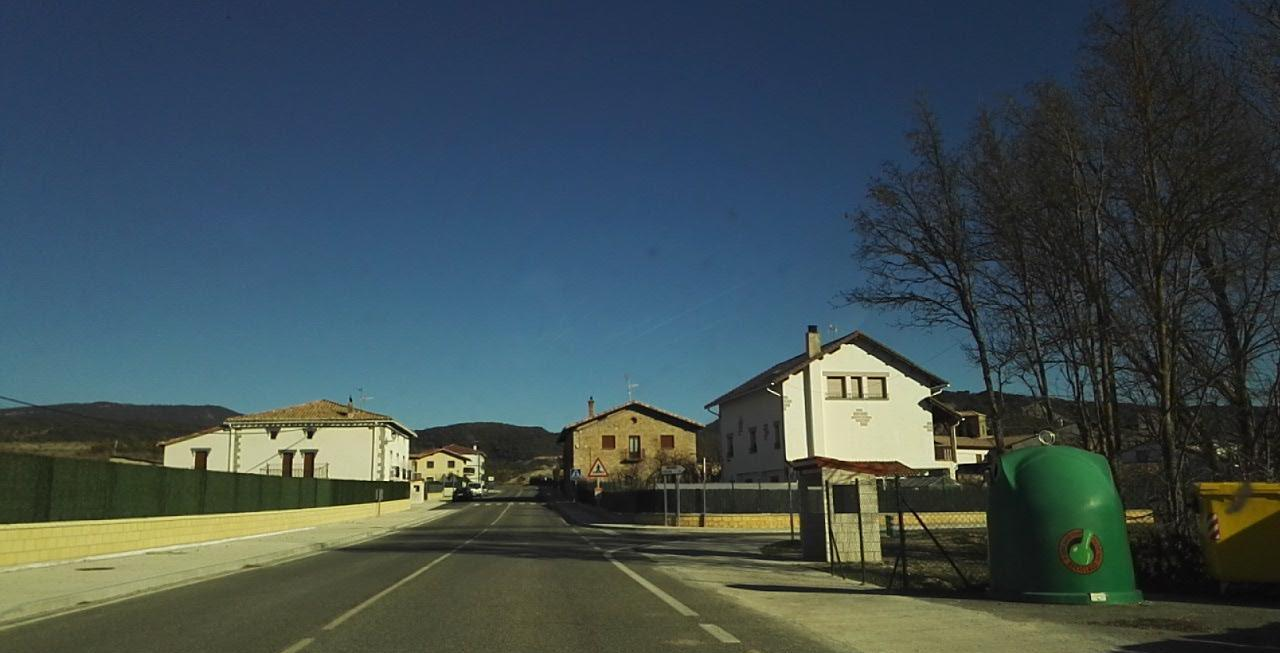
Street of Romanzado

Romanzado (Basque: Erromantzatua) is a municipality located in the province and autonomous community of Navarre, northern Spain. The municipality is shaped by the rivers Salazar, Areta and their tributaries, comprising 10 villages and minor population nuclei scattered across an extension of 91.44 km^{2}. The municipality numbers 154 inhabitants (2004).

== Name ==
The name has attracted much linguistic attention on the grounds that it suggests a Romance-speaking enclave in an otherwise Basque-speaking surrounding area sometime in the Middle Ages. However, evidence points to the area being monolingual Basque-speaking well in the 16th century.
