= María de Bohórquez =

Spanish Protestant

María de Bohórquez (1539 in Sevilla – 1559 in Sevilla), was a Spanish Protestant. She was executed for heresy by the Spanish Inquisition and was regarded a Protestant martyr. She became the subject of a novel, Cornelia Bororquia. Historia verdadera de la Judith by Luis Gutiérrez (1799).
