= Francisco Bojórquez Mungaray =

Mexican politician

- Born: 2 August 1935 (age 90); Moctezuma, Sonora, Mexico
- Occupation: Politician
- Political party: PRI

Francisco Bojórquez Mungaray (born 2 August 1935) is a Mexican politician affiliated with the Institutional Revolutionary Party. He served as Senator of the LIX Legislature of the Mexican Congress representing Sonora as replacement of Eduardo Bours, and previously served in the Congress of Sonora.
