= Xavier Uncle =

Twitter account

Xavier Uncle is a Twitter account known for posting humorous tweets.

== Background ==
Xavier Uncle
(@xavierunclelite)
tweeted:

Finally I’m able to pay my house rent after investing in stock market. Before that, I used to own a house.

April 7, 2025

Xavier Uncle is a Twitter account with over 100,000 followers. The account is known for posting humorous tweets. The Xavier Uncle account's profile image features an Indian man, who is thought to be Om Prakash, a technician from IITK. The Xavier Uncle account has been the focus of criticism, particularly by a group of Redditors in a subreddit, who think the Xavier Uncle account is a bad copycat of the earlier Twitter account Pakalu Papito who used the same profile image as the Xavier Uncle account and posted similar things.

== History ==
The predecessor to Xavier Uncle, Pakalu Papito, started as a Twitter account created in 2013, but more Pakalu Papito accounts were later made on other platforms. The anonymous account's first post was "hello twiter i am single". The Pakalu Papito account played an Indian clerk at a convenience store. The account was known for the self-deprecating humor posted about the fictional character, Papito, who supposedly ran the account. The face used by the account was that of Om Prakash, a faculty member at IIT-Kanpur college. The original Pakalu Papito Facebook account had a link in its about section, which went to the Facebook page of a Lee Nova, who had an avatar of a Caucasian person. The account has been accused of racism for playing to stereotypes of South Indians. All of the Pakalu Papito accounts were suspended in 2018, alongside the disappearance of the Lee Nova page. After Pakalu Papito account was blocked, a similar account with the username pakalupapitow succeeded in replicating the original's success.

In 2015 the Xavier Uncle account was created on Twitter with the same avatar image as the Pakalu Papito accounts. According to posts by the Xavier Uncle account written in 2023, they deactivated their Twitter account in 2018 to focus on their career, but they came back in 2020 during the COVID-19 pandemic. In the same series of posts, the Xavier Uncle expressed his gratitude for the account's success during that year, particularly noting that he has been featured in "all major meme pages". The series of posts also shared that the person behind the Xavier Uncle account would be working for a "reknowned[sic] law firm of India" from July 2023 onwards. The Free Press Journal alleges that Xavier Uncle is an Indian man working for an tech support firm in Minneapolis, Minnesota. Telangana Today claims Xavier Uncle is Pakalu Papito.
