= Geraldine Javier =

Filipino visual artist

Geraldine Javier is a contemporary Filipina Visual Artist whose work is best known for her work which blends of painting with various media, and is "recognized as one of the most celebrated Southeast Asian artists both in the academic world and in the art market."

She rose to prominence in 2003 when she received the Cultural Center of the Philippines' Thirteen Artists award., and has since exhibited her works widely both in the Philippines and abroad.

== Early life and training ==
Born in 1970, in Makati, Javier did not start out with a training in arts as most of her contemporaries did, having first pursued a career in nursing before turning to the arts.

When she did eventually begin her art training through a bachelor's degree at University of the Philippines Diliman (UP) College of Fine Arts, she was strongly influenced Roberto Chabet, who is known for "highly conceptually oriented training" - a fact which some critics credit her "predilection for making art which emphasises intellectual engagement over immediate emotional response."

== Visual style and inspirations ==
Javier's work is best known for its blending of various media - sometimes with her oil paintings incorporated into installation art, and sometimes with various media such as embroidery or found objects prominently incorporated into her canvases.

Artist and art writer Nastia Voynovskaya, describing Javier's show, “Stuck in Reverse", in Berlin, notes:

"Instead of stretching her canvases, she incorporates her oil painting into her installations, sewing them like tapestries into tent structures that evoke the feeling of 'home'."

Her immediate sources of references are film and photography. "Some of her most vivid memories of childhood include afternoon sessions in front of the television watching classics like Knife in the Water by Ingmar Bergman, or local films such as Kisapmata, Itim, Insiang and Himala by Filipino directors Lino Brocka, Ishmael Bernal, whose sensibilities evoke those of old, moody European films." The moodiness of such sources influences the moodiness of her work.

== Prominent themes ==
Malaysian curator and arts writer Adeline Ooi describes her work in context:

"She belongs to a new generation of young Filipino artists whose interests are variegated and extensive, and who, unlike their social-realist predecessors, are engaged in pursuing the personal and the idiosyncratic. These voices from the periphery express powerful individual narratives influenced by international media and local pop culture. Their works are charged with tension and provocation, combining cool, calculated sophistication with raw urban grit -“the general low-end third world stuff.”

Voynovskaya furthers that "[her] works show a strong reference of mortality. Combining cool, calculated sophistication with raw urban grit. Images of death, misery, dysfunctional relationships, and emotional violence are recurrent themes. Her world thrives on complex, viscous thoughts and intimations, silent tensions and implosions." Javier's works combine such themes into a conflict of the familiar and the unrecognizable, forcing the viewer to concentrate.

Ooi notes that the use of religious iconography in some of Javier's work, while "devoid of any affiliation with a particular religion" and aiming at "communicating universal, collective values," is "connected to her own biography, having lived and struggled with the catholic culture in the Philippines." She quotes Javier as saying in 2001:

“I had a primary and secondary Catholic education. The nuns taught us of the sacrifices of Jesus and the other martyrs and from this I can deduce that the catholic religion‘s foundation was built on blood and guilt as a consequence. The same guilt that the church exploits as it continues to exert an almost authoritarian influence on Philippine society and our government to the point of paralysis in terms of decision and policy making."

On the religious iconography found in Javier's Stuck in Reverse exhibition, Godfrey comments:

"The Philippines is perhaps now the most staunchly Catholic of countries. Many Filipino artists are virulently opposed to the Catholic Church’s continued domination of society and respond with blasphemous detournements of its imagery and objects. Javier ... has long since stopped attending church but though in a work such as Blood Type C (Catholic), Major Major G (Guilt) of 2011 she has attacked its control she has also made work that recreates her delight as a child in making images of saints or performing ceremonies."

== Solo exhibitions ==
Exhibitions in the Philippines include:

- “Fearing, Doubting, Wondering, Hoping, Dreaming” at Arario Gallery, Shanghai, China (2018).
- "Beginnings and Endings" at the West Gallery, Quezon City, Philippines (2017).
- "Curiosities" at the Vargas Museum, U.P. Diliman, Quezon City, Philippines (2013)
- "Red Fights Back” at Silverlens Gallery, Makati, Philippines (2012).
- “2012 Inventory” at West Gallery, Quezon City, Philippines (2012).
- "Always Wild, Still Wild” at Finale Art File, Makati, Philippines (2011)
- "Butterfly's Tongue" at the West Gallery, Quezon City, Philippines (2009).
- "Samploc Cave Paintings" at the Finale Art Gallery, Philippines (2008)
- "Living Images, Leaden Lives" at the West Gallery, Art Center, SM Megamall, Mandaluyong, Manila, Philippines (2008)
- "Girls Will Not Be Girls" Art Center, SM Megamall, Mandaluyong, Manila, Philippines (2006)
- “HAHA HUHU” at West Gallery, Manila, Philippines (2006).
- “Plaster Saints” at Valentine Willie Fine Art, Kuala Lumpur, Malaysia (2006).
- “Most Beautiful Memories are Those of Childhood” at Finale Art Gallery, Manila Philippines (2006).
- “Veiled Hostility” at West Gallery, Manila, Philippines (2005).
- “Sea Whores” at Theo Gallery, Manila Philippines (2005).
- "Weight of Light" Finale Gallery, Lao Center, Makati, Manila, Philippines (2005).
- “There is no there there” at West Gallery, Manila, Philippines (2004).
- “Freezing the Flight Hummingbirds” at West Gallery, Manila, Philippines (2003)
- “Red on Her Skirt” at West Gallery, Makati, Philippines (2002)
- “Dividing the House” at West Gallery, Manila, Philippines (2001)
- “Very Scurry Furry Tales” at Surrounded by Water Gallery, Manila, Philippines (2001).
- “Hospital Diary of XN (Discovery Series” at Hiraya Gallery, Manila, Philippines (1996).

Since 2004, Javier has been exhibiting her work internationally. Some include:

- “Fearing, Doubting, Wondering, Hoping, Dreaming” at Arario Gallery, Shanghai, China (2018).
- “Beyond the Veil” at Arario Gallery, Seoul, Korea (2013).
- "Stuck in Reverse" at ARNDT, Berlin (2013-2014).
- "Asia: LOOKING SOUTH" at ARNDT, Berlin (2011).
- “Chapel of Many Saints and Sinners” at Equator Art Projects Gallery, Gillman Barracks, Singapore (2012).
- "Playing God in an Art Lab" at the Singapore Tyler Print Institute, Singapore (2012).
- "Museum of Many Things" at the Valentine Willie Fine Art, Singapore (2011).
- "In The Beginning..." at Arario Gallery, Korea (2011).

== Group exhibitions ==
- “Migration Melbourne Edition”, an international pop-up exhibition of ARNDT, at Ormond Hall, Melbourne, Australia (2012).
- “Incidental Pleasure” at MO Space, Taguig, Philippines (2012).
- “STRIP Painters as Photographers” at Silverlens Gallery, Makati, Philippines (2011).
- “Beacons of Archipelago: Contemporary Art from Southeast Asia” at Arario Gallery, Cheonan, South Korea (2010).
- “Prague Biennale 2009” Prague, Czech Republic (2009).
- “I Have Nothing to Paint and I’m Painting It” at MO Gallery, Fort Bonifacio, Manila, Philippines (2007).
- “Headlights 2007” at Valentine Willie Fine Art, Kuala Lumpur, Malaysia (2007).
- “The Way We Get By” at West Gallery, Quezon City, Philippines (2006).
- “Signed & Dated - our 10th Anniversary Edition” at Valentine Willie Fine Art, Kuala Lumpur, Malaysia (2006).

== Achievements ==
- Participated at the Prague Biennale, Prague, Czech Republic (2009).
- Awarded with the Thirteen Artists Award, issued by the Cultural Centre of the Philippines (CCP), Manila.
- Recipient of the Ateneo Art Awards, issued by the Ateneo Art Gallery, Philippines (2004)
