= Royler Gracie =

Brazilian Jiu-Jitsu practitioner and mixed martial artist

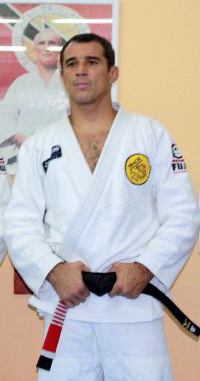
- Royler Gracie
- Born: December 6, 1965 (age 60); Rio de Janeiro, Brazil
- Nationality: Brazilian & American
- Height: 5 ft 8 in (1.73 m)
- Weight: 150 lb (68 kg; 11 st)
- Division: Featherweight; Lightweight
- Team: Gracie Humaitá; Victory MMA
- Rank: 8th deg. BJJ coral belt (under Rorion Gracie)

Mixed martial arts record
- Total: 11
- Wins: 5
- By submission: 4
- By decision: 1
- Losses: 5
- By knockout: 2
- By submission: 1
- By decision: 2
- Draws: 1

Other information
- Notable students: Saulo Ribeiro, Leonardo Xavier, Leticia Ribeiro, Cleber Luciano
- Mixed martial arts record from Sherdog

Royler Gracie
Medal record

Brazilian Jiu-Jitsu/Grappling

World Jiu-Jitsu Championship
Gold medal – first place	1999	Featherweight (black)
Gold medal – first place	1998	Featherweight (black)
Gold medal – first place	1997	Featherweight (black)
Bronze medal – third place	1997	Absolute (black)
Gold medal – first place	1996	Featherweight (black)

ADCC World Championship
Gold medal – first place	2001	−65 kg
Gold medal – first place	2000	−65 kg
Gold medal – first place	1999	−65 kg

Pan American Championships
Gold medal – first place	1999	Featherweight (black)
Gold medal – first place	1997	Featherweight (black)

Royler Gracie (born December 6, 1965) is a Brazilian-American retired mixed martial artist and Brazilian jiu-jitsu practitioner. Gracie ran the Gracie Humaitá school in Rio de Janeiro for many years under his father Helio's direction, and lives and teaches in La Jolla, CA. Considered a legend of jiu jitsu and submission wrestling, Gracie is a member of both the IBJJF Hall of Fame, and the ADCC Hall of Fame.

== Biography ==
As son to the late Grandmaster, Helio Gracie and brother of Rickson and Royce Gracie, Royler is a member of the Gracie family. He holds an 8th degree red/black belt in the style pioneered by his family, Brazilian jiu-jitsu.

Prior to his retirement, Royler competed in the black-belt ranks for 20+ years. Royler is also a four-time World Jiu-Jitsu Champion in the Pena/Featherweight Black Belt Category and has placed in the Absolute Division.

Royler has a professional mixed martial arts record of five wins, five losses and one draw. His retirement fight came on September 14, 2011 at the age of 45 when he lost to Masakatsu Ueda via split decision.

In 2003, Royler Gracie faced Eddie Bravo in the quarterfinals of the ADCC tournament in the under 66 kg/145 lbs bracket. Royler was 38 years old at the time, but still regarded as one of the favorites to win the division. Bravo did exceptionally well against Royler, submitting him by way of triangle as the Gracie tried one of his trademarked knee sliding guard passes. Royler had a highly anticipated rematch against Eddie Bravo on March 29, 2014 at Metamoris III in a submission-only competition format. Despite a tight calf slicer submission attempt and multiple groin stretch attempts by Eddie the match concluded as a draw after the 20 minutes ran out due to the no points rule.

== Media appearances ==
In a season 3 episode of the Wildboyz, Steve-O and Chris Pontius visit Brazil and attend the Gracie Jiu-Jitsu school in Rio de Janeiro. Royler takes on Chris Pontius and chokes him out, while female student Leticia Ribeiro defeats Steve-O via armbar submission.

== Published works ==
Gracie has co-written three instructional books on Brazilian jiu-jitsu:

- Brazilian Jiu-Jitsu: Theory and Practice with his cousin Renzo Gracie
- Brazilian Jiu-Jitsu Submission Grappling Techniques with author Kid Peligro
- Gracie Submission Essentials: Grandmaster and Master Secrets of Finishing a Fight with his late father Helio Gracie and Kid Peligro

== Personal life ==
Royler is married to Vera Lucia Ribeiro. They have four daughters.

On September 23, 2015 Royler became a citizen of the United States of America.

== Instructor lineage ==
Kano Jigoro → Tomita Tsunejiro → Mitsuyo "Count Koma" Maeda → Carlos Gracie → Helio Gracie → Royler Gracie

== Mixed martial arts record ==
Professional record breakdown
11 matches	5 wins	5 losses
By knockout	0	2
By submission	4	1
By decision	1	2
Draws	1	

Res.	Record	Opponent	Method	Event	Date	Round	Time	Location	Notes
Loss	5–5–1	Masakatsu Ueda	Decision (split)	Amazon Forest Combat 1	September 14, 2011	3	5:00	Manaus, Brazil	
Loss	5–4–1	Hideo Tokoro	Decision (unanimous)	K-1 Premium 2006 Dynamite!!	December 31, 2006	2	5:00	Osaka, Japan	
Loss	5–3–1	Norifumi Yamamoto	KO (punch)	Hero's 3	September 7, 2005	2	0:38	Tokyo, Japan	Hero's 2005 Lightweight Grand Prix quarter-final.
Win	5–2–1	Koji Yoshida	Decision (majority)	Hero's 2	July 6, 2005	2	5:00	Tokyo, Japan	
Win	4–2–1	Kazuyuki Miyata	Submission (triangle choke)	Rumble on the Rock	November 20, 2004	2	2:46	Honolulu, Hawaii, USA	
Loss	3–2–1	Genki Sudo	KO (punches)	K-1 MMA ROMANEX	May 22, 2004	1	3:40	Saitama, Japan	
Draw	3–1–1	Takehiro Murahama	Draw (time limit)	Deep – 1st Impact	January 8, 2001	2	10:00	Nagoya, Japan	
Loss	3–1	Kazushi Sakuraba	Technical Submission (kimura)	Pride 8	November 21, 1999	2	13:16	Tokyo, Japan	Royler demanded special rules: No stand ups, no judges
Win	3–0	Yuhi Sano	Submission (armbar)	Pride 2	March 15, 1998	1	33:14	Yokohama, Japan	
Win	2–0	Noboru Asahi	Submission (rear-naked choke)	Vale Tudo Japan 1996	July 7, 1996	1	5:07	Urayasu, Japan	Royler demanded special rules: No strikes on ground
Win	1–0	Ivan Lee	Submission (rear-naked choke)	Universal Vale Tudo Fighting 2	June 24, 1996	1	1:33	Brazil	
