= Javier, Leyte =

Municipality in Leyte, Philippines

Javier Bugho
- Municipality
- Municipality of Javier
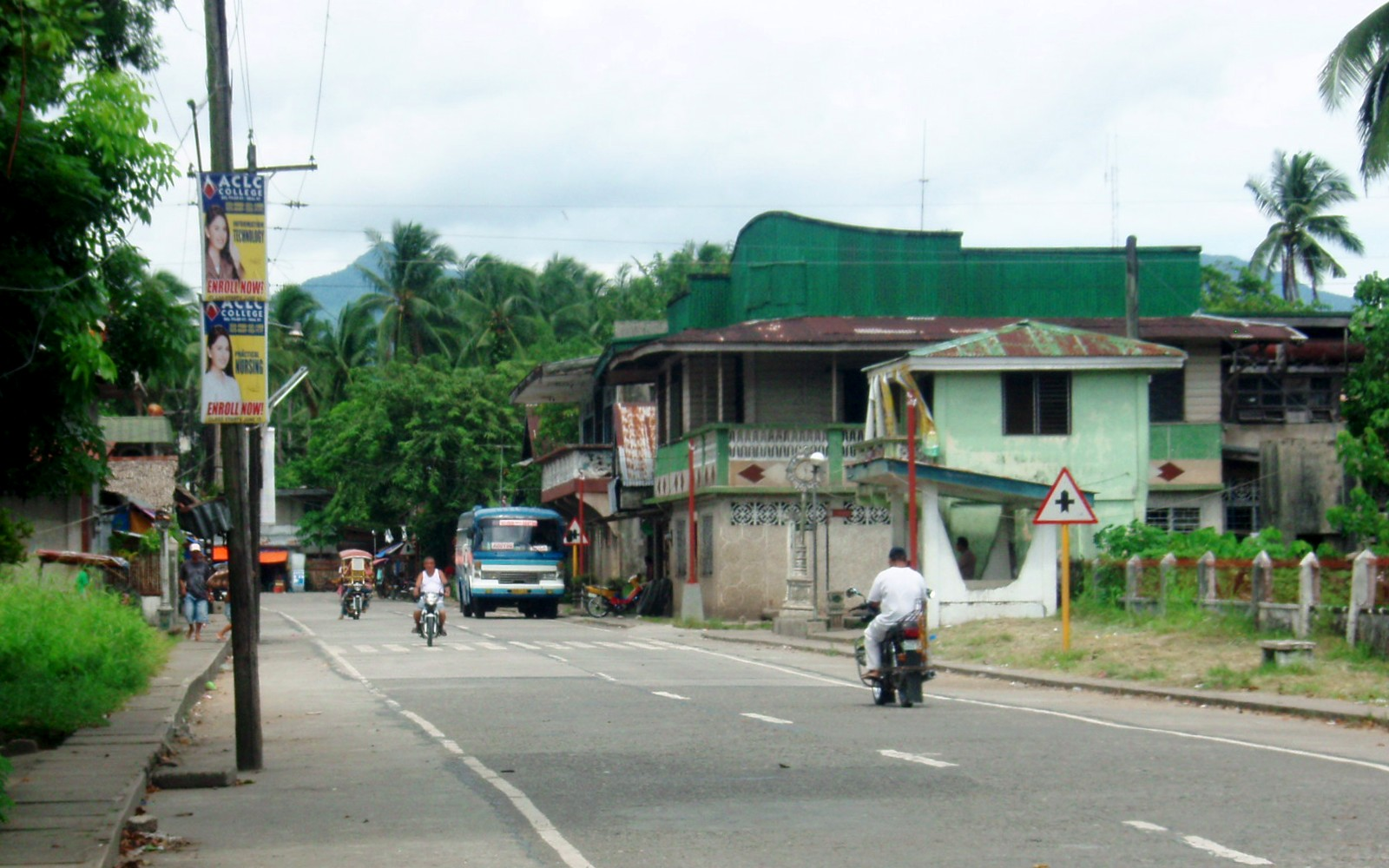
- Downtown area

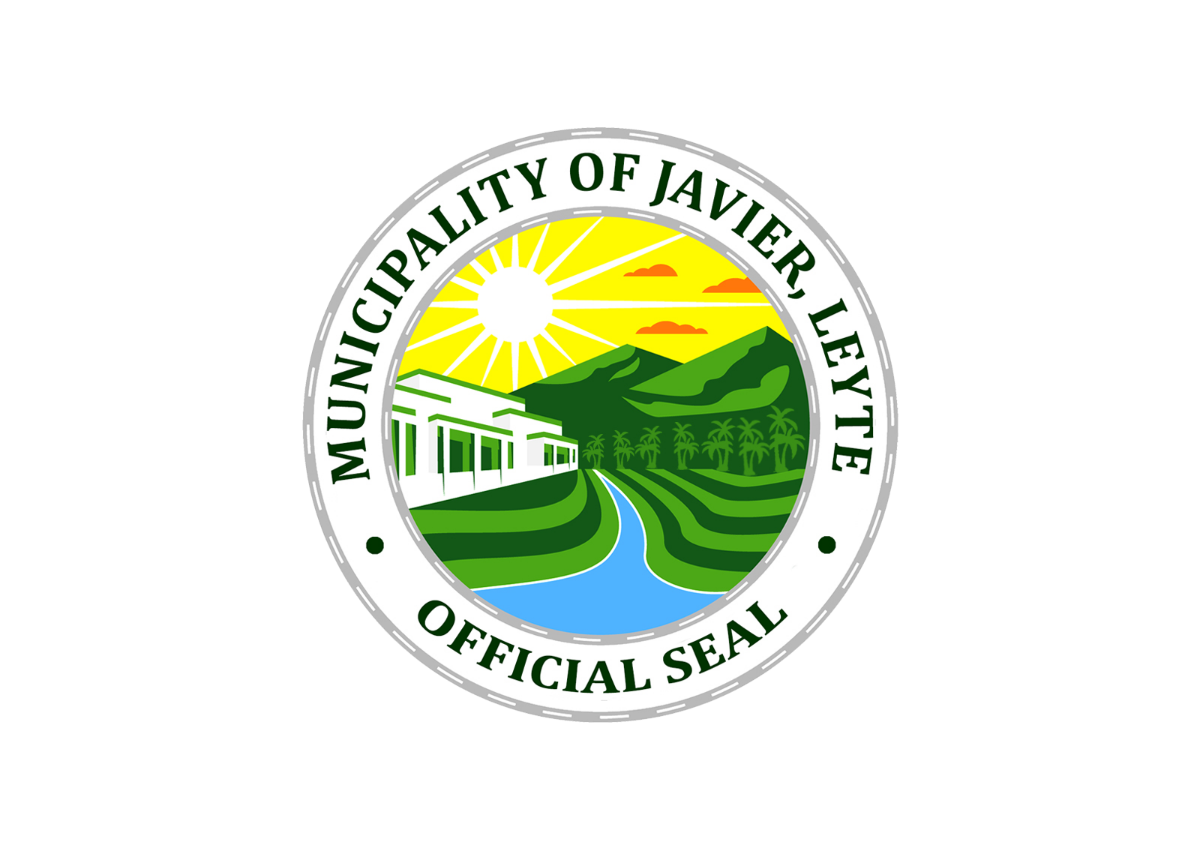
- Flag

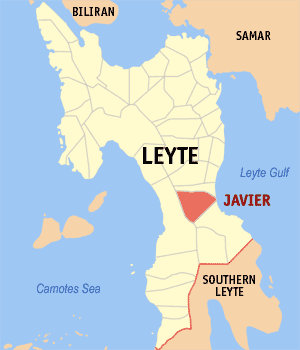
- Map of Leyte with Javier highlighted
- Interactive map of Javier
- Location within the Philippines
- Coordinates: 10°47′35″N 124°56′10″E
- Country: Philippines
- Region: Eastern Visayas
- Province: Leyte
- District: 5th district
- Founded: June 1961 (as Bugho)
- Renamed as Javier: December 1965
- Named for: Daniel Falcon Javier
- Barangays: 28 (see Barangays)

Government
  - Type: Sangguniang Bayan
  - Mayor: Michael Dragon T. Javier
  - Vice Mayor: Mark Christopher T. Javier
  - Representative: Carl Nicolas C. Cari
  - Councilors: List: • Guilbert M. Lanoy; • Roldan G. Meras; • Jose Whirly C. Cumla; • Amado S. Moreno; • Schubert A. Riños; • Marino C. Merilo; • Stephen Mark I. Papalid; • Eriberta R. Ponce; DILG Masterlist of Officials
  - Electorate: 18,087 voters (2025)

Area
  - Total: 152.70 km^{2} (58.96 sq mi)
- Elevation: 80 m (260 ft)
- Highest elevation: 661 m (2,169 ft)
- Lowest elevation: 0 m (0 ft)

Population (2024 census)
  - Total: 27,759
  - Density: 181.79/km^{2} (470.83/sq mi)
  - Households: 6,980

Economy
  - Income class: 3rd municipal income class
  - Poverty incidence: 28.95% (2023)
  - Revenue: ₱ 250.9 million (2024)
  - Assets: ₱ 739.9 million (2024)
  - Expenditure: ₱ 210.5 million (2024)
  - Liabilities: ₱ 208.3 million (2024)

Service provider
  - Electricity: Don Orestes Romualdez Electric Coperative (DORELCO)
- Time zone: UTC+8 (PST)
- ZIP code: 6511
- PSGC: 0803724000
- IDD : area code: +63 (0)53
- Native languages: Waray; Tagalog
- Website: www.javier-leyte.gov.ph

Javier (IPA: [hɐ'vjɛɾ]), officially the Municipality of Javier (Waray: Bungto han Javier; Tagalog: Bayan ng Javier), is a municipality in the province of Leyte, Philippines. According to the 2024 census, it has a population of 27,759 people.

== History ==
The municipality of Javier, Leyte was formerly barrio of the municipality of Abuyog, Leyte. Bugho was the former name of the town and is a contraction of the dialect term "Binogho" (from the root word buho), meaning a small clearing within a forest area. Settlers at about the turn of the century cultivated this small patch of land. Among the earliest known settlers was Macario Cultura, a native of Burauen, Leyte who was believed to have led his friends and relatives to cultivate the fertile soil of the area. Later on, as the settlement of the people thrived, it then became a sitio of barrio Pinocawan, and was established as a barrio since the Spanish colonial occupation.

Sometime in 1914, Daniel Falcon Javier of Consolacion, Sogod, Southern Leyte and a former teacher and principal of Cebu Normal School of Cebu City in the early 1900s came to explore the surroundings of the new settlement. At that time, he recently came from Cabadbaran, Agusan del Norte where he started extensive farming activities since 1908 after his resignation as a principal at the Cebu Normal School.

A malaria plague in Cabadbaran, however, inflicted a heavy death toll among his people so he was urged to explore other suitable areas until he found Bugho. Impressed by the quality of the soil, he started staking out his claims in Bugho and moved from Cabadbaran. Subsequently, Daniel married Dolores Mercado Veloso of Consolacion, Sogod, Southern Leyte, and settled in Bugho naming his settlement as Camalig. He initiated projects in the community where he was readily accepted as a teacher. Daniel Javier's advocacy was to educate the people. He opened a school in 1918 on an area donated by Pedro Abordo with Leona Valles as the first teacher. Daniel Javier is a dedicated man without any vices. He led the people to community activities and eventually improve their working habits, eradicate superstitions that hampered progress and introduced the use of vaccines and medicines. He also urged the community to accept the modern and progressive way of agriculture.

The community rapidly progressed as people from Cebu particularly in Argao and Bohol came at the invitation and assistance of Mr. D.F. Javier who helped them legally acquire land-holdings. The people from Argao led by Pedro Gacera of Barrio Talaytay settled at the western part of the town of what is now called Barrio Binulho.

A much larger school that can accommodate and assist the growing population of students was needed to be built, so Mano Daniel (as the people fondly called Daniel F. Javier) invited Mr. Waters, an American Superintendent to help them build one. Mr. Waters agreed and together with Evaresto Retucsan donated a new site for the school with the people contributing a counterpart of 1,000.00 Pesos after the release of 7,000.00 pesos from the government. The people through the bayanihan system furnished most lumber requirements.

Corn, abacá & coconut were the main products of the community. Mano Daniel introduced irrigation utilizing the abundant water resources. It became a progressive community and was the center of trade among the neighboring barrios. In 1939, it was among the contenders for township with barrios Palale and MacArthur. Since Mano Daniel's leadership was recognized by the provincial and district politicians, he used these influences to bring community developments.

Bugho was not only the center of resistance activities but also an evacuation center during the World War II. Food and other resources were provided continually and the local residents supported the guerrilla movement. After the war, guerrilla remnants turned into an organized banditry as Bugho still at the center of these activities. Meanwhile, the locals continued to work at their respective farms and productivion boosted together with the evacuees helping them.

Coconut, rice, abaca and ginger became the main products. Although the organized banditry still existed, peace and order was not fully restored yet, the people were not deterred in their desire to become an independent municipality. During the mid-1950s, with the help of Attorney Higino A. Acala, Sr. the "Bugho for Municipal Movement" was organized with Felomino Mercado, Pedro Gecera, Angel Caminong, Ambrocio Novio, Bernardino Tisado and Julia Brosas among its leaders. On December 18, 1959, at the initiative of Mayor Catalino Landia, the municipal council of Abuyog was convened to a session at Bugho endorsing by way of Resolution No. 7 to convert Bugho into an independent municipality of Abuyog to include the barrios of Caraya (Caraye), Ulhay, Tambis, Comatin, Caranhug, Talisayan and Manarug among many others.

House Bill No. 2895 sponsored by Congressman Veloso of the 3rd District Leyte and co-sponsored by Speaker Daniel Z. Romualdez of the 1st district passed through the Senate and became Republic Act 3422 creating the municipality of Bugho in June 1961. The first municipal election was on November 12, 1963 and on January 3, 1964, the following officials were elected: Ambrocio Novio - Mayor, Felimon Tano - Vice Mayor, Vicente Rellin, Ruperto de Luna, Ruperto Villamor, Hidulfo Malasaga, Pastor Dingal, Eutiquiano Badique as councilors. It began its operations as a 7th class municipality.

In December 1965, the municipal Council unanimously approved a resolution to change the name of the municipality of Bugho to Javier, in honor of the late Daniel Falcon Javier, who died in Consolacion, Sogod in 1957.

In 1970, the seat of government was finally transferred to the present site on a building constructed through the efforts of Congressman Artemio Mate.

In 1972, the son of the late Daniel F. Javier, Domingo V. Javier, was elected Mayor. Within a few months after his assumption of office and before martial law, road networks were vastly improved.

After 38 years, the decades-old political leadership of the Cua's was challenged when businessman Leonardo "Sandy" Javier, Jr. ran as Mayor in 2010. His desire to “give back” blessings had pushed him to serve his hometown, concentrating his efforts on converting the poor municipality into a model town that would be emulated not only in the region but in the whole country. However, he was overwhelmingly victorious against his rival during the local election held that same year.

== Geography ==
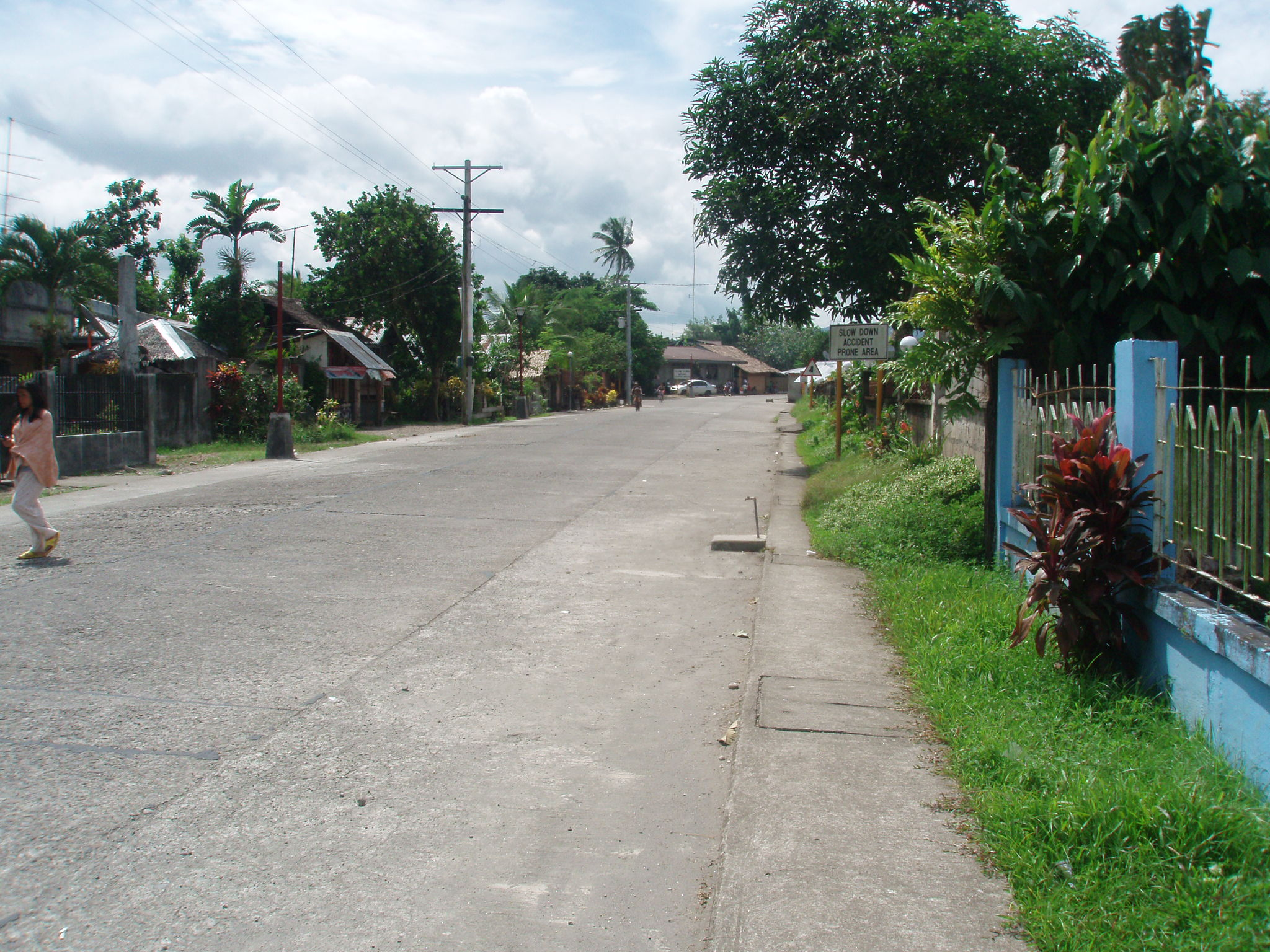
Tandang Sora Street in Poblacion Zone-1

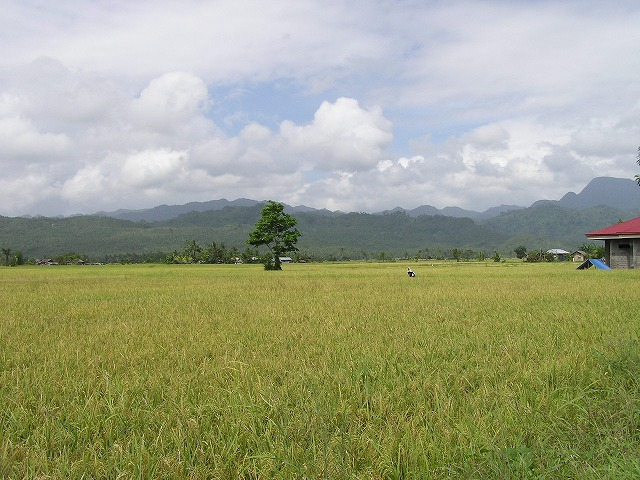
One of the rice granaries of Poblacion

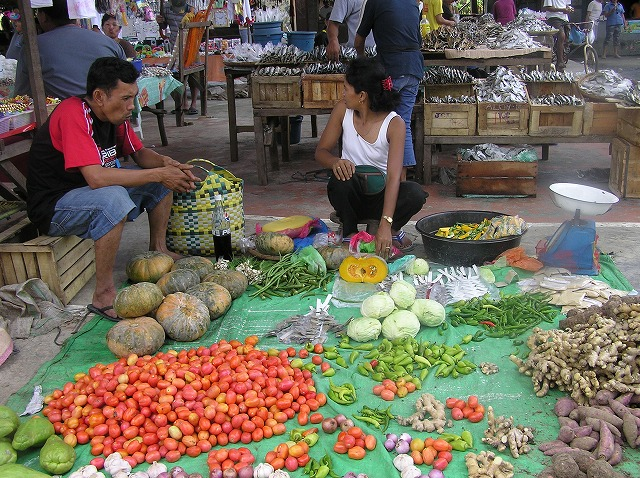
Local high value commercial crops

A rural town approximately 73 kilometres (45 mi) south of Tacloban City, Javier is located between the boundaries of Baybay on the west side and MacArthur and Abuyog towns, along Leyte Gulf. It has a very narrow coastlines and coastal plains facing the Pacific.

=== Barangays ===
Javier is subdivided politically into 28 barangays. Each barangay consists of puroks and some have sitios.

As per RA 3422 - An Act Creating the Municipality of Bugho as an independent municipality in the Province of Leyte, enacted on June 18, 1961.

- Abuyogay
- Batug
- Binulho
- Bonifacio (Pundok)
- Calzada
- Cancayang
- Caranhug
- Caraye
- Casulungan
- Comatin
- Guindapunan
- Inayupan
- Laray
- Magsaysay
- Malitbogay
- Manarug
- Manlilisid
- Naliwatan
- Odiong
- Picas Norte (Curba)
- Pinocawan
- Poblacion Zone 1
- Poblacion Zone 2
- Rizal
- Santa Cruz (Katun-an)
- Talisayan
- San Sotero (Tambis)
- Ulhay

=== Climate ===
Climate data for Javier, Leyte
Month	Jan	Feb	Mar	Apr	May	Jun	Jul	Aug	Sep	Oct	Nov	Dec	Year
Mean daily maximum °C (°F)	28 (82)	28 (82)	29 (84)	30 (86)	30 (86)	29 (84)	29 (84)	29 (84)	29 (84)	29 (84)	29 (84)	28 (82)	29 (84)
Mean daily minimum °C (°F)	22 (72)	22 (72)	22 (72)	23 (73)	24 (75)	25 (77)	25 (77)	25 (77)	25 (77)	24 (75)	24 (75)	23 (73)	24 (75)
Average precipitation mm (inches)	78 (3.1)	57 (2.2)	84 (3.3)	79 (3.1)	118 (4.6)	181 (7.1)	178 (7.0)	169 (6.7)	172 (6.8)	180 (7.1)	174 (6.9)	128 (5.0)	1,598 (62.9)
Average rainy days	16.7	13.8	17.3	18.5	23.2	26.5	27.1	26.0	26.4	27.5	24.6	21.0	268.6
Source: Meteoblue

== Demographics ==
Population census of Javier
Year	Pop.	±% p.a.
1970	15,163	—
1975	15,787	+0.81%
1980	17,307	+1.85%
1990	18,658	+0.75%
1995	21,539	+2.73%
2000	22,857	+1.28%
2007	23,453	+0.36%
2010	23,878	+0.66%
2015	25,379	+1.17%
2020	26,658	+1.04%
2024	27,759	+0.98%
Source: Philippine Statistics Authority

In the 2024 census, the population of Javier was 27,759 people, with a density of 180 inhabitants per square kilometre or 470 inhabitants per square mile.

=== Language ===
Javier is a melting pot for both Waraynon and Cebuano speaking natives. But Lineyte-Samarnon Waray-waray language is the official language spoken in the town.

== Economy ==
Poverty incidence of Javier (%)

Source: Philippine Statistics Authority

== Culture ==
=== Festival ===
The Karayhakan is held every 28 May.

== Government ==
2025-2028 Javier, Leyte Officials
Position	Name	Party
Mayor	Michael Dragon T. Javier	NPC
Vice Mayor	Mark Christopher T. Javier	NPC
Councilors	Emma M. Abueva	NPC
Councilors	Guilbert M. Lanoy	NPC
Councilors	Nora G. Maballo	NPC
Councilors	Stephen Mark I. Papalid	NPC
Councilors	Romeo C. Malinao	NPC
Councilors	Michelle O. Moreno	NPC
Councilors	Marino C. Merilo	NPC
Councilors	Schubert A. Riños	NPC
Ex Officio Municipal Council Members
ABC President	TBD	Nonpartisan
SK Federation President	TBD	Nonpartisan

== Tourism ==
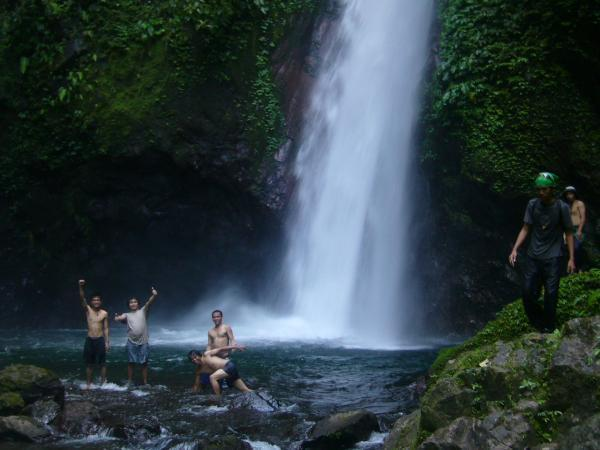
Bito Falls in Caraye

Tourist Destinations:

- Shoretime Hotel in Brgy. Picas and Pob. Zone II, Javier, Leyte
- Gab Water Park Resort in Brgy. Malitbogay, Javier, Leyte
- Bito Falls in Brgy. Caraye
- Kaawasan Falls in Brgy. Binulho, Javier, Leyte
- Talisayan Falls in Brgy. Manarug
- Kadarahunan Falls in Brgy. Guindapunan
- Buga River in Caraye
- Circumferential Road
- Lake Bito
- Hemat-e Falls in Brgy. Malitbogay and Brgy. Odiong
- Sangat River in Odiong
- Overview in Guindapunan
- Sea Sight Beach Resort in Brgy. Casulongan
- Moonlight Beach Resort in Brgy. Casulongan
- Paradeeso Beach Resort in Brgy. Casulongan
- Buffalo Dairy Farm
- Tufting Machine Facility
- Manarug Cold Spring

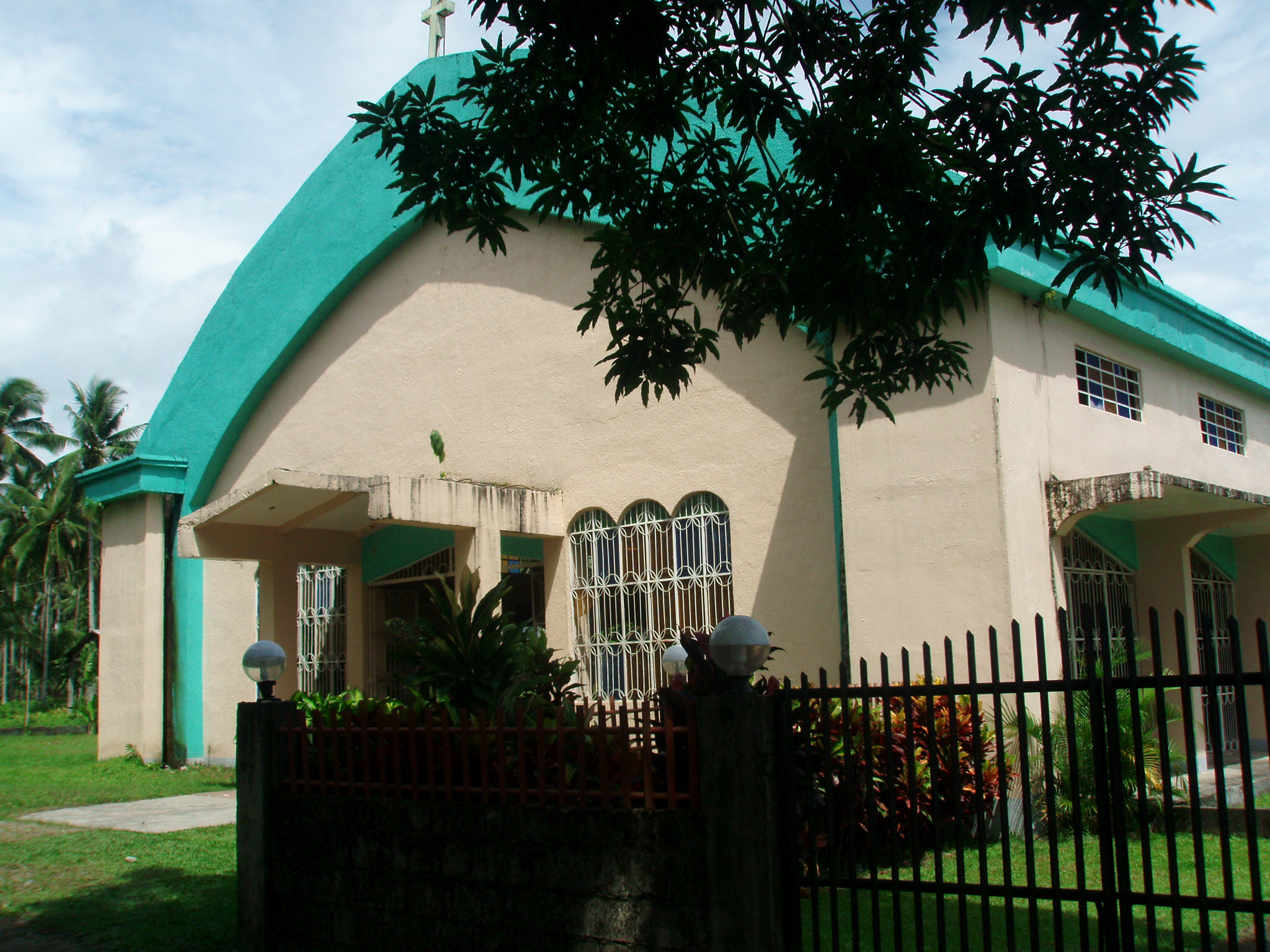
St. Michael Church main facade

Landmarks:

- East Visayan Adventist Academy Complex (EVAA)
- New St. Michael Parish Church
- Santo Niño Shrine
- Javier Market Square

== Education ==
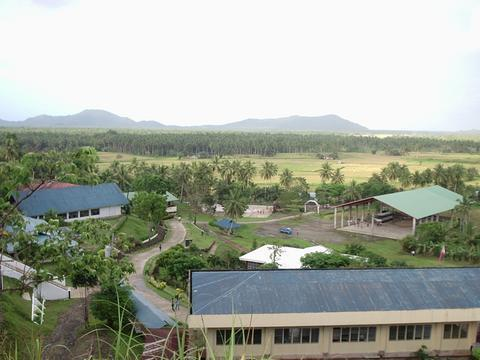
East Visayan Adventist Academy San Sotero (Tambis) Campus at bird's eye view

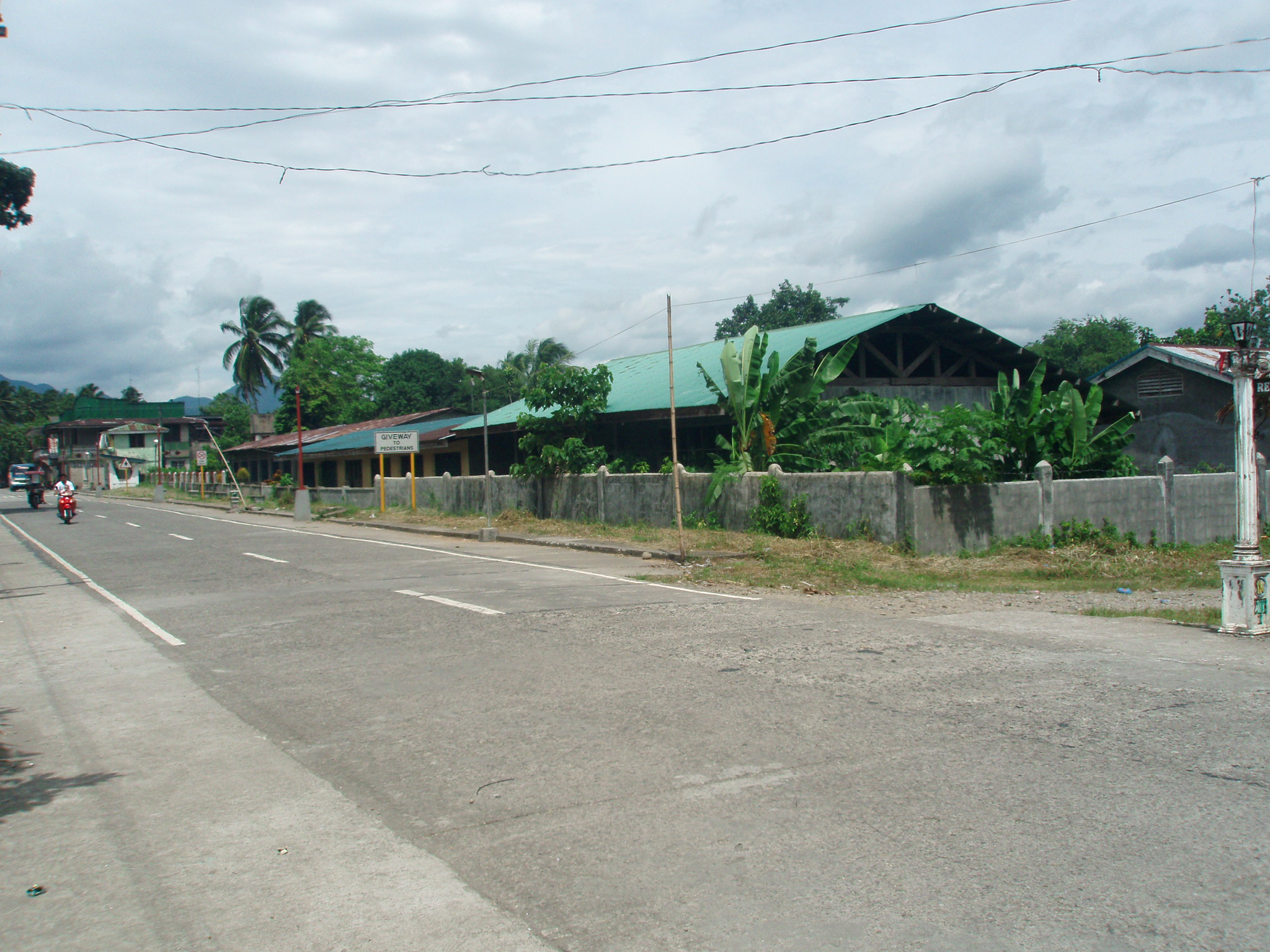
Rear view at Real Street of Historic Javier Central School Campus

Prep schools:

- Angelicum Catechetical School
- Day Care Centers
- Faith Baptist Learning Center

Primary schools:

- Javier Central School
- Manlilisid Central School

     (including Barangay Elementary Schools)

- East Visayan Adventist Academy - San Sotero (Tambis)

Secondary schools:

- Javier National High School (Main Campus)
- Manlilisid National High School
- Batug National High School - Javier Annex
- East Visayan Adventist Academy - San Sotero (Tambis)

== Notable people ==
- Lolita Javier, Incumbent Congresswoman for Leyte's 2nd Congressional district.

== See also ==
- List of renamed cities and municipalities in the Philippines
