= Xavier (given name) =

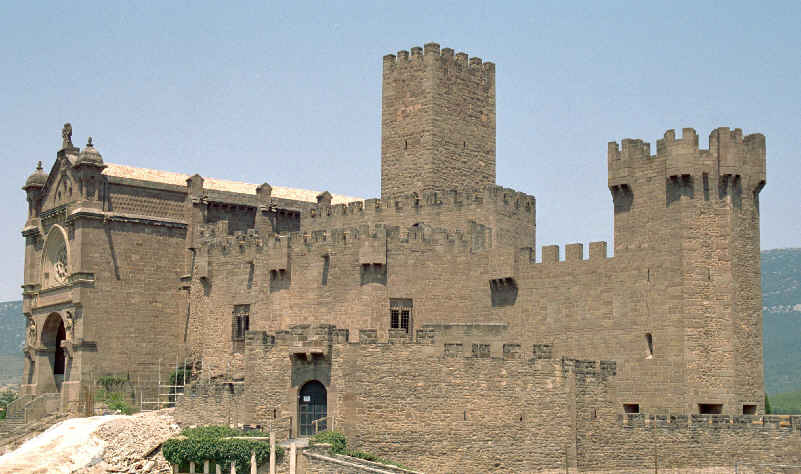
- The Castle of Xavier, where Francis Xavier was born, was restored by the Jesuits.
- Gender: Male

Origin
- Origin: Catholic Church
- Meaning: "Castle" or "new house" in the Basque language
- Region of origin: Navarre

Other names
- Related names: Javier, Xaver, Xaveria, Xavi, Xavia, Xaviell, Xaviera, Xaviero, Xever, Xabier, Zavian, Zavier, Chavier, Savielly, Ksawery

The given name Xavier (/ˈzeɪviər, ˈseɪ-, ˈzævieɪ/, Catalan: [ʃəβiˈe, ʃaviˈeɾ, tʃaviˈeɾ], Galician: [ʃaˈβjeɾ], Portuguese: [ʃɐviˈɛɾ], French: [ɡzavje, ksavje]; Spanish: Javier [xaˈβjeɾ]; Basque: Xabier [ʃaβier]) is a masculine name derived from the 16th-century Navarrese Roman Catholic Saint Francis Xavier.

== Etymology ==
Xavier comes from the name of the Jesuit missionary saint Francis Xavier, where Xavier stands for his birthplace of Javier (Xabier in Basque; Xavier in Old Spanish) in the Kingdom of Navarre. The toponym is itself the romanization of the Basque place-name (and surname) etxe berri, meaning 'castle', 'new house' or 'new home'.

== Usage in the United States ==
An increase in usage of the name in the United States has been attributed to the Marvel Comics character Charles Xavier, and the feature film version of that character played by Patrick Stewart.

== In other languages ==
- Javier (Spanish)
- Ksaveras (Lithuanian)
- Ksaverij (Ксаверий) (Russian, Ukrainian)
- Ksawery (Polish)
- Sabelius (Latin)
- Savielly (Polish)
- Saverio (Italian)
- Xawery (Polish)
- Xabere, Xabel (Asturian)
- Xabier (Basque, Galician)
- Xaver (Czech, German, Slovak)
- Xavér (Hungarian)
- Xaveriu (Romanian)
- Xaveriοs (Ξαβέριος) or (Σαβέριος) (Greek)
- Xaverius (Dutch, Latin, Indonesian)
- Xavier (Catalan, English, French, Portuguese, Swedish)
- Zabieru (Japanese)

== People ==
=== Arts ===
- Xavier Abraham (born 1945), Spanish poet
- Xavier Abril (1905–1990), Peruvian poet
- Xavier Armange (born 1947), French writer and illustrator
- Xavier Arsène-Henry (1919–2009), French modernist architect and urban planner
- Xavier Atencio (1919–2017), American animator for The Walt Disney Company
- Xavier Barbier de Montault (1830–1901), French liturgical writer
- Xavier Blum Pinto (born 1957), Ecuadorian artist
- Xavier Beard (born 1992) American rapper
- Xavier Boniface Saintine (1798–1865), French dramatist and novelist
- Xavier Cortada (born 1964), Cuban-American painter
- Xavier Cugat (1900–1990), Spanish-Cuban bandleader
- Xavier Davis (born 1971), American jazz pianist
- Xavier Dolan (born 1989), Canadian actor and filmmaker
- Xavier Fagnon (born 1972), French voice actor
- Xavier Forneret (1809–1884), French poet, playwright and writer
- Xavier Fourcade (1926–1987), French American art dealer
- Xavier Herbert (1901–1984), Australian writer
- Xavier Lopez (born 2003), American rapper and record producer
- Xavier Trudeau (born 2007), Canadian singer-songwriter, son of former Canadian Prime Minister Justin Trudeau
- Xavier Martinez (1869–1943), American artist of Mexican descent
- Xavier Naidoo (born 1971), German singer-songwriter
- Xavier Pérez Grobet (born 1964), Mexican cinematographer
- Xavier de Planhol (1926–2016), French historical scholar
- Xavior Roide aka Xav (born Paul Wilkinson 1976) frontman of Romo band DexDexTer, live keyboard player with Placebo
- Xavier de Rosnay (born 1982), French musician
- Xavier Rudd (born 1978), Australian singer-songwriter
- Xavier Samuel (born 1983), Australian actor

=== Law, military and politics ===
- Xavier Albertini (born 1971), French politician
- Xavier Becerra (born 1958), American politician
- Xavier Bertrand (born 1965), French politician
- Xavier Bettel (born 1973), Luxembourgish politician
- Xavier Bonnefont (born 1979), French politician
- Xavier Bout de Marnhac (born 1951), French military general
- Xavier Brasseur (1865–1912), Luxembourgish politician
- Xavier Breton (born 1962), French politician
- Xavier Connor (1917–2005), Australian judge
- Xavier Coppolani (1866–1905), French military leader
- Xavier Darcos (born 1947), French politician
- Xavier, Duke of Parma and Piacenza (1889–1977), pretender to the defunct throne of Parma, and Carlist claimant to the throne of Spain
- Xavier Kyooma, Ugandan politician
- Xavier de Magallon (1866–1956), French poet, translator and politician
- Xavier Jesus Romualdo, Filipino politician
- Xavier Sylvestre Yangongo (1946-2024), Central African military general and politician
- Xavier Espot Zamora (born 1979), Andorran politician and current prime minister of Andorra

=== Sports ===
- Xavier Adibi (born 1984), American football player
- Xavier Aguado (born 1968), Spanish association football player
- Xabi Alonso (born 1981), Spanish association football player and manager
- Xavier Atkins (born 2005), American football player
- Xabier Azkargorta (1953–2025), Spanish football player and manager
- Xavier Báez (born 1987), Mexican association football player
- Xavier Barrau (born 1982), French association football player
- Xavier Beitia (born 1982), American AFL and college football player
- Xavier Bertoni (born 1988), French freestyle skier
- Xavier Booker (born 2004), American basketball player
- Xavier Capdevila Romero (born 1976), Andorran ski mountaineer
- Xavier Carter (born 1985), American track and field athlete
- Xavier Chen (born 1983), Belgian association football player
- Xavier Clarke (born 1983), indigenous Australian rules football player
- Xavier Coleman (born 1995), American football player
- Xavier Comas Guixé (born 1977), Andorran ski mountaineer
- Xavier Corosine (born 1985), French basketball player
- Xavier Crawford (born 1995), American football player
- Xavier Daufresne (born 1968), Belgian tennis player
- Xavier Delisle (born 1977), Canadian ice hockey player
- Xavier Dirceu (born 1977), Brazilian association football player
- Xavier Doherty (born 1982), Australian cricketer
- Xavier Dorfman (born 1973), French Olympic rower
- Xavier Downwind (1893–1968), American NFL player
- Xavier Edwards (born 1999), American baseball player
- Xavier Ellis (born 1988), Australian rules football player
- Xavier Eluère (1897–1967), French Olympic boxer
- Xavier Escudé (born 1966), Spanish Olympic field hockey player
- Xavier Florencio (born 1979), Spanish road bicycle racer
- Xavier Fulton (born 1986), American football player
- Xavier Gipson (born 2000), American football player
- Xavier Guillory (born 2001), American football player
- Xavier Henry (born 1991), American basketball player
- Xavier Hernández Creus, commonly known as Xavi (footballer, born 1980) (born 1980), Spanish association football manager and former player
- Xavier Hill (born 2001), American football player
- Xavier Hutchinson (born 2000), American football player
- Xavier Johnson (basketball) (born 1999), American basketball player
- Xavier Johnson (American football) (born 1999), American football player
- Xavier Jones (born 1997), American football player
- Xavier Kelly (born 1997), American football player
- Xavier Loyd (born 2003), American football player
- Xavier Maassen (born 1980), Dutch racing driver
- Xavier McDaniel (born 1963), American basketball player
- Xavier McKinney (born 1999), American football player
- Xavier Malisse (born 1980), Belgian tennis player
- Xavier Manuel (born 1987), American football player
- Xavier Margairaz (born 1984), Swiss association football player
- Xavier Mitchell (born 2006), American professional baseball player
- Xavier Munford (born 1992), American basketball player
- Xavier Nady (born 1978), American former baseball player
- Xavier Newman-Johnson (born 1999), American football player
- Xavier Ouellet (born 1993), French-Canadian ice hockey player
- Xavier Proctor (born 1990), American football player
- Xavier Restrepo (born 2002), American football player
- Xavier Rhodes (born 1990), American football player
- Xavier Robinson, American football player
- Xavier Rush (born 1977), New Zealand rugby player
- Xavier Silas (born 1988), American basketball player
- Xavier Quentin Shay Simons or Xavi Simons (born 2003), Dutch association football player
- Xavier Sneed (born 1997), American basketball player in the Israeli Basketball Premier League
- Xavier Thomas (born 1999), American football player
- Xavier Tillman (born 1999), American basketball player
- Xavier Truss (born 2001), American football player
- Xavier Watts (born 2001), American football player
- Xavier Woods (American football) (born 1995), American football player
- Xavier Worthy (born 2003), American football player

=== Other ===
- Xavier, Duke of Aquitaine (1753–1754)
- Xabier Arzalluz (1932–2019), Basque nationalist politician
- Xavier Bichat (1771–1802), French anatomist and pathologist
- Xavier Briggs (born 1968), American sociologist
- Xavier Chamorro Cardenal (1932–2008), Nicaraguan journalist
- Xavier Ehrenbert Fridelli (1673–1743), Austrian Jesuit missionary
- Xavier Fernique (1934–2020), French mathematician
- Xavier Le Pichon (1937–2025), French geophysicist
- Xavier Mertz (1882–1913), Swiss explorer
- Xavier de Montclos, (1924–2018), French historian of religion
- Xavier Roberts (born 1955), American inventor and manufacturer of Cabbage Patch Kids
- Xavier Rolet (born 1959), French businessman and chief executive officer of the London Stock Exchange
- Francis Xavier Seelos (1819–1867), German Roman Catholic missionary
- Xavier Yap Jung Houn (born 1973), Singaporean convicted double killer of his twin sons
- Xavier Zubiri (1898–1983), Spanish philosopher

== Fictional characters ==
- Xavier, the main character of the animated series Xavier: Renegade Angel
- Xavier, a main character in the 2022 series The Afterparty, played by Dave Franco
- Xavier Austin, a character in the Australian soap opera Home and Away
- Xavier Benedict, a character in Julia Golding's Finding Sky book trilogy
- Xavier Bird, a character in Joseph Boyden's novel Three Day Road
- Xavier, a fictional red ruffed lemur from the animated film Night of the Zoopocalypse
- Xavier Chavez, a character in the film Saw II
- Xavier Dolls, a character in the supernatural Western TV series Wynonna Earp
- Xavier Harkonnen, a character in the fictional Dune universe
- Brigadier General Frank Xavier Hummel, antagonist of the film The Rock
- Xavier March, protagonist of Robert Harris' novel Fatherland
- Xavier Quinn, protagonist of the film The Mighty Quinn
- Xavier Riddle, the main character in the PBS Kids animated series Xavier Riddle and the Secret Museum
- Xavier Thorpe, a character in the Netflix series Wednesday

== See also ==
- Xavier (surname)
- Xavier (wrestler) (1977–2020), American wrestler
- Zavier Simpson (born 1997), American basketball player
