= Daniel Falcon Javier =

Daniel F. Javier

Personal details
- Born: Consolacion, Sogod, Leyte, Captaincy General of the Philippines
- Died: 1957 Consolacion, Sogod, Leyte, Philippines
- Occupation: Educator

Daniel F. Javier was a Filipino teacher, born in Consolacion, Sogod, Southern Leyte.

He was teacher and principal of Cebu Normal School of Cebu City in the early 20th-century. In 1914, he explored the surrounding area of the new settlement in the barrio Bugho of Abuyog, Leyte. At that, time he had come from Cabadbaran, where he had farmed since 1908 after his resignation as principal at the Cebu Normal School.

He died in Consolacion in 1957. Two years after his death, Bugho was finally converted to an independent municipality. In December 1965, the Bugho Municipal Council unanimously approved a resolution to change its name to Javier, in honor of him.

== Bibliography ==
- LGU Resource Person; Unknown, arki8eac (1996). History of Javier, Leyte. Javier LGU. pp. 01–02.
