= Xaviera Jessurun =

Surinamese activist

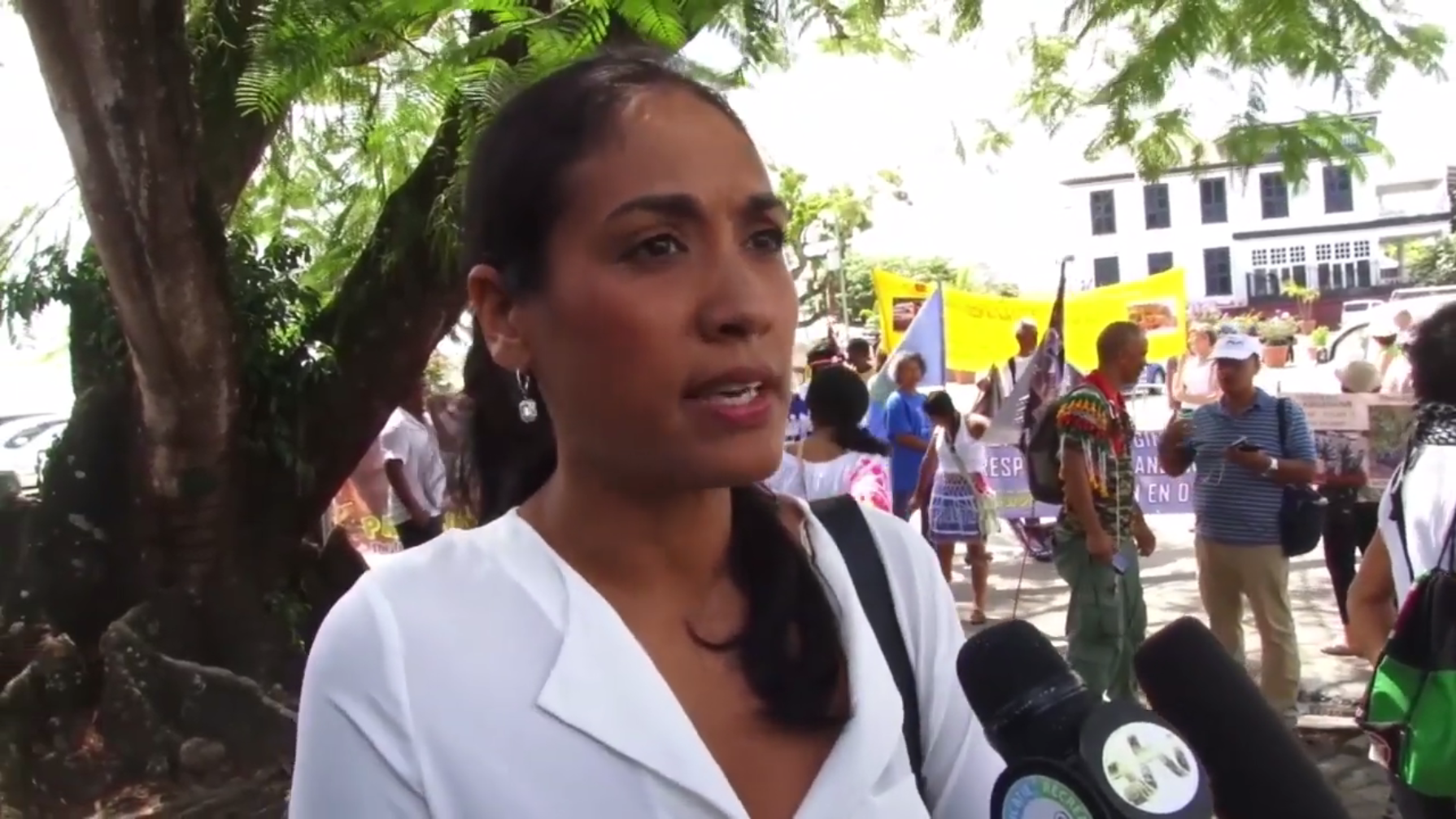
- Born: 1977/1978
- Occupations: politician, activist, businessperson

Xaviera Jessurun is a Surinamese politician, businesswoman and activist who is a spokesperson for the Next Generation Movement.

== Biography ==
=== Para Junior League ===
Jessurun was involved with the Para Junior League (PJL) in the early 2010s. She worked as manager of the Clarence Seedorf Stadion. During this time, international footballer Clarence Seedorf invested a lot of money and energy in Surinamese football to raise its level.

=== The Next Generation ===
She had her own business that failed during the economic crisis in 2016. This left her with free time, which she spent reading documents such as the state budget, election manifestos, legislation, and international treaties. Meanwhile, she formed The Next Generation with nine other core members. This was a Facebook group that "fights for our constitutional rights". She often acts as a spokesperson, although she does not see herself as the leader. "My voice is worth just as much as that of the nine other core members... but someone has to speak out," says Jessurun.

=== Protesting ===
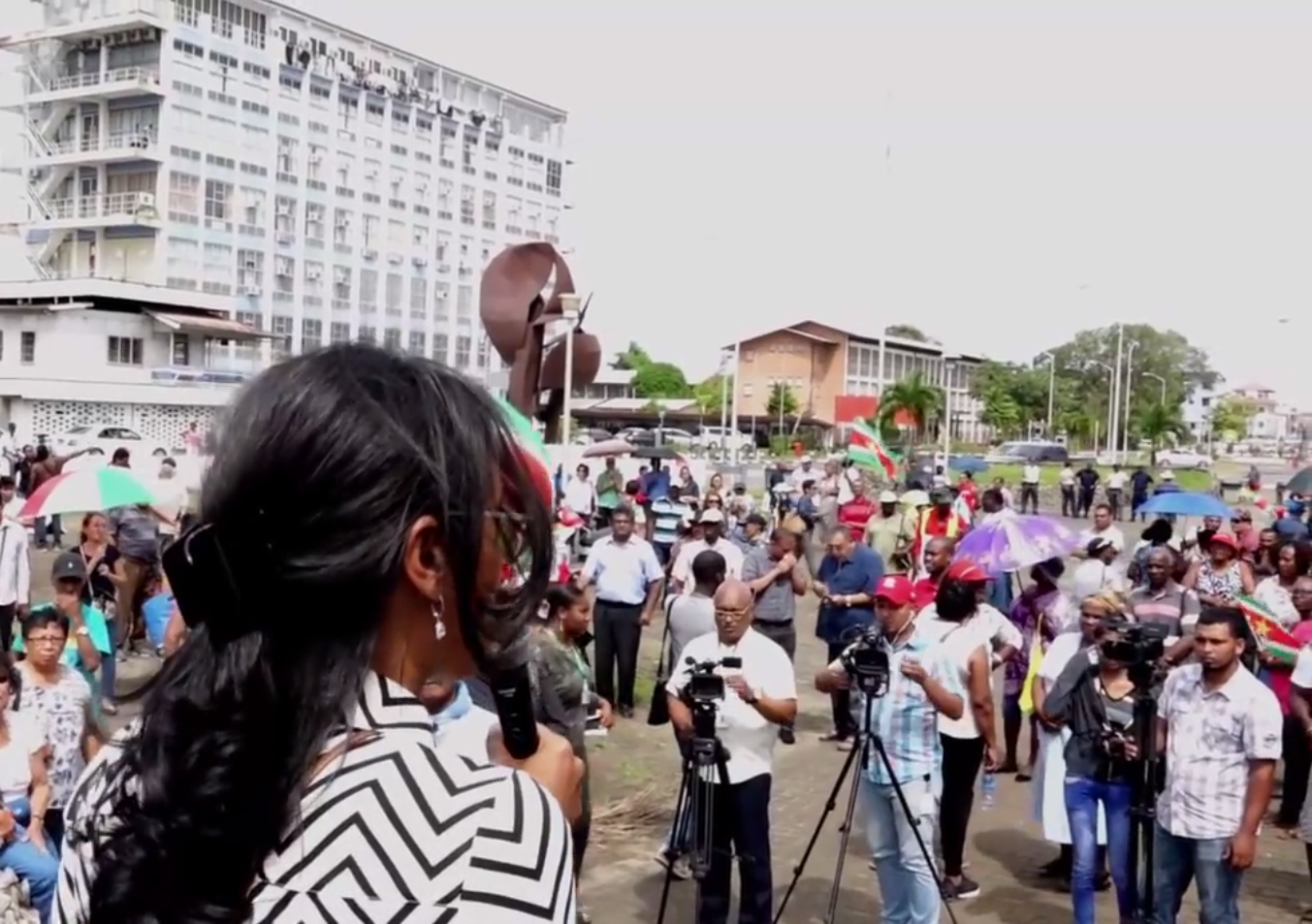
Speech by Jessurun, 2018

On 25 November 2016, Jessurun organized their first anti-government protest with The Next Generation. Starting 3 April 2017, several trade unions and a business union mobilized for a series of protests, which were joined four days later by multiple groups and activists. Jessurun and The Next Generation also joined, as did members of Wij Zijn Moe(dig) and Maisha Neus. Jessurun was also present at subsequent protests, including the fifth day of protest at Theater Unique, where the police and riot police acted with heavy-handedness and several leaders were arrested.

In early 2018, several activists decided to turn to politics to prepare for the 2020 Surinamese general election. Maisha Neus founded STREI! for this purpose , and a number of members of Wij Zijn Moe(dig) founded the Partij voor Recht en Ontwikkeling (PRO). Jessurun decided not to make the turn into politics and to continue the protest on the streets and the internet. During the elections, she campaigned with the slogan "Vote SMART", advising people against voting for small, potentially hopeless parties. She wanted to prevent votes from being lost and falling to the NDP.

=== SLM ===
Since January 2022, Jessurun has been the Supervisory Board of the Surinamese Aviation Company (SLM). From mid-2023 to 2025, she served as an advisor to Minister Albert Ramdin of the Minister of Foreign Affairs, International Business and International Cooperation of the Republic of Suriname .

=== OAS ===
Since Ramdin took office as Secretary-General of the Organization of American States (OAS), she served as his chief of staff in Washington, D.C.

In December 2025, the Surinamese Ministry of Foreign Affairs revoked the diplomatic passport that had been issued to Jessurun on 13 May 2025. The ministry cited information from the Public Prosecution Service, which had designated Jessurun as a suspect since 2 February 2025 in a criminal investigation into the Surinam Airways (SLM) case. Jessurun contested the revocation, filing an objection with the president, which was rejected. She subsequently surrendered the passport under protest.

In June 2026, the United States revoked Jessurun's diplomatic visa, citing the ongoing criminal investigation into alleged corruption in Suriname. With the loss of her diplomatic status she could no longer legally remain in the United States. She subsequently resigned from her position as chief of staff to OAS Secretary-General Ramdin. Sources within the organization indicated she had decided to step down even before the visa revocation, recognizing her position had become untenable. No official response from Jessurun or Surinamese authorities had been made public at the time of reporting.
