= Javier (name) =

Javier (Xavier)
- Pronunciation: [xaˈβjeɾ]
- Gender: Male

Origin
- Origin: Javier, Kingdom of Navarre, today part of Spain
- Meaning: from a placename meaning Castle or New House
- Region of origin: Latin Europe

Other names
- Related names: Xabier, Xavier

Javier (pronounced [xäˈβjeɾ, χäˈβ˕eɾ, häˈβjeɾ, xäˈbje̞, häˈbje̞, ha̟ˈβ˕jɛ]) is the Spanish spelling of the masculine name Xavier.

The name derives from the Catholic saint called Francis de Xavier, where Xavier refers to the saint's birthplace. This birthplace name, in turn, has Basque roots, etymologically originating in the word etxaberri (etxe berri in standard spelling), meaning "castle" or "new house".

The original place name went through a Romance phonetic change in Navarro-Aragonese, a Romance language spoken in the neighbouring Romanzado (cf. Leire) from the Early Middle Ages. Like examples can be found in Irunberri > Lumbier, Erronkari > Roncal. It was later borrowed by Castilian. Other variations of this name include Xaverius, Xever, Javiero, and Saverio. The feminine names Javiera, Saveria, Zaviera, and Saverina are less common.

Etxeberria, Echeverría, Echevarría, Etxebarri, and Chávarri are Basque surnames related to the name by etymology.

Its diffusion is due to the fame of Jesuit priest and missionary Saint Francis Xavier (Spanish: San Francisco Javier). When he was canonized, places and people were named after him, which popularized the name.

Contemporary use of the name Javier is found in Spain, Equatorial Guinea and Ibero American countries, where it is popular.

== Etymology: from Etxaberri to Javier ==
- Loss of the initial e
- Loss of the ending i
- Middle, accentuated, e became the diphthongized form ie
- Old Spanish X was pronounced /ʃ/ as in Basque, like an English sh. Old Spanish /ʃ/ then merged with J (then pronounced the English and later the French way) into /x/, which is now spelled J and pronounced like Scottish or German ch or as English h.

== Pronunciation ==
In the English-speaking world, especially in the British media, the pronunciation of "Javier" is frequently confused with the pronunciation of French words or names ending in "-ier" such as Xavier or Olivier. The resulting pronunciation "HAV-ee-ay" is a hybrid of Spanish, French and English. In Spanish, correctly spoken, the final syllable sounds much like the English word "air", not the English word "eh".

In Singapore, the name is pronounced "JAY-vee-er" /ˈdʒeɪviər/ as if it were an English name.

== In other languages ==
- (Aragon) Aragonese Chabier
- (Asturias) Asturian: Xabel
- (Basque Country (autonomous community)) Basque: Xabier
- (Castile (historical region)) Castilian: Javier
- (Catalonia) Catalan Xavier
- (England) English: Xavier /ˈzeɪviər/
- (France) French: Xavier
- (Galicia (Spain)) Galician: Xabier
- (Germany) German: Xaver (pronounced [ˈksaːvɐ])
- (Italy) Italian: Saviero or Saverio
- (Vatican City) Latin: Xaverius
- (Malta) Maltese: Saverju
- (Castile and León) Leonese: Xabiere
- (Philippines) Philippine languages: Javier or Xavier
- (Poland) Polish: Ksawery
- (Portugal) Portuguese: Xavier
- (Russia) Russian: Ксаверий (Ksavierij)

== Notable people ==
- Javier Aguirre (born 1958), Mexican football manager and former player
- Javier Ambrossi (born 1984), Spanish actor
- Javier Aquino (born 1990), Mexican footballer
- Javier Báez (born 1992), Puerto Rican baseball player
- Javier Bardem (born 1969), Spanish actor
- Javier Botet (born 1977), Spanish actor
- Javier Calvo (born 1991), Spanish actor and film director
- Javier Camarena (born 1976), Mexican operatic tenor
- Javier Ceriani (born 1971), Argentine radio host and actor
- Javier Chevantón (born 1980), Uruguayan footballer
- Javier Colon (born 1978), American singer-songwriter
- Javier Gandolfi (born 1980), Argentine footballer
- Javier Giraldo (1944–2026), Colombian priest
- Javier Godino (born 1978), Spanish actor
- Javier Guarino (born 1986), Uruguayan footballer
- Javier Hernández (born 1988), Mexican footballer
- Jay Hernandez, born as Javier (born 1978), American actor
- Javier Manquillo (born 1994), Spanish former footballer
- Javier Manzano (born 1975), Mexican-American filmmaker and photojournalist
- Javier Marías (1951–2022), Spanish author
- Javier Mascherano (born 1984), Argentine football manager and former player
- Javier Methol (1935–2015), Uruguayan businessman, survivor of the Uruguayan Air Force Flight 571 crash
- Javier Milei (born 1970), President of Argentina
- Javier Mojica (born 1984), Puerto Rican basketball player
- Javier Morales (born 1980), Argentine footballer and football manager
- Javier Oliván (born 1977), Spanish business executive
- Javier Ovando (born 1977), Honduran victim of police brutality in the US
- Javier Pastore (born 1989), Argentine footballer
- Javier Peña (born 1958), American DEA agent
- Javier Revuelta (born 1957), Spanish equestrian
- Javier Rey (born 1980), Spanish actor
- Javier Saviola (born 1981), Argentine footballer
- Javier Solís (1931–1966), Mexican singer
- Javier Tebas (born 1962), Spanish lawyer and sports administrator
- Javier Weyler (born 1975), Argentine drummer
- Javier Zamora (born 1980), Salvadoran-American poet and activist
- Javier Zanetti (born 1973), Argentine footballer

== See also ==
- Javy
- Javier (surname)
