= Spanish Inquisition =

System of tribunals enforcing Catholic doctrine

Tribunal of the Holy Office of the Inquisition Tribunal del Santo Oficio de la Inquisición
- Seal for the Tribunal in Spain; Flanking the cross is a sword, symbolising the punishment of heretics, and an olive branch, symbolising reconciliation with the repentant. In Latin, the inscription "Exurge Domine et judica causam tuam. Psalm 73." ("Arise, Lord, and judge your cause")

Type
- Type: Tribunal under the Spanish monarchy, for upholding religious orthodoxy in their realm

History
- Established: 1 November 1478
- Disbanded: 15 July 1834
- Seats: Consisted of a Grand Inquisitor, who headed the Council of the Supreme and General Inquisition, made up of six members. Under it were up to 21 tribunals in the empire.

Elections
- Voting system: Grand Inquisitor and Suprema designated by the crown

Meeting place
- Spanish Empire

Footnotes
- See also: Medieval Inquisition; Mexican Inquisition; Peruvian Inquisition; Portuguese Inquisition; Roman Inquisition

The Tribunal of the Holy Office of the Inquisition (Spanish: Tribunal del Santo Oficio de la Inquisición) was authorized by Pope Sixtus IV in 1478 and the first inquisitors, Miguel de Morillo and Juan de San Martín, were appointed by the future Catholic Monarchs, King Ferdinand II of Aragon and Queen Isabella I of Castile, in 1480. Although its stated aim was to maintain Christian orthodoxy, it became an effective instrument of state power by replacing the Medieval Inquisition, which was under Papal control.

Over the course of the Inquisition, the Inquisition prosecuted an estimated 150,000 people for various offences. Of these, an estimated 3,000–5,000 were turned over to the state for execution, particularly in the initial 50 years, mostly by burning at the stake. Other punishments included penance and public flogging, exile, enslavement on galleys, and prison terms ranging from several years to life imprisonment. According to Joseph Pérez an important aspect of many of these punishments was the profit motive confiscation of all the victims' property.

The Inquisition was originally intended primarily to identify heretics among those who converted from Judaism and Islam to Catholicism. The regulation of the faith of newly converted Catholics intensified following the royal decrees issued in 1492 and 1502 ordering Jews and Muslims to either convert to Catholicism, leave Castile or face death. Hundreds of thousands of forced conversions, torture and executions, the persecution of conversos and moriscos, and the mass expulsions of Jews and Muslims from Spain all followed. An estimated 40,000–100,000 Jews were expelled in 1492 and estimated 300,000 of Muslims/Moriscos in 1602 to 1609. Conversos were subjected to blood purity statutes (limpieza de sangre), which introduced racially-based discrimination and antisemitism, lasting into the 19th and 20th centuries. Moriscos were subjected to centuries-long campaign of forced conversion, cultural suppression, surveillance, discrimination, violence, and finally mass expulsion.

After the fall of Granada in 1492, the Muslims were initially promised religious freedom, but from 1502, Muslims in Castile were ordered to choose baptism or exile; Valencia and Aragon followed in the 1520’s. Philip II’s 1566-67 measures banned Arabic in speech and writing, Arabic books and names, traditional clothing, music, holidays and other customs, while also applying discriminatory taxation to damage their silk-trade livelihood.

Repression provoked the Alpujarras revolt in 1568-71. After its suppression, the Moriscos of Granada were forcibly removed and scattered across northern Spain, breaking up communities that had been living there for centuries.

The inquisition expanded to other domains under the Spanish Crown, including Southern Italy and the Americas, while also targeting those accused of alumbradismo, Protestantism, witchcraft, blasphemy, bigamy, sodomy, and Freemasonry. A notable feature was the auto-da-fe, where the accused were paraded, sentences read, and confessions made, after which the guilty were turned over to civil authorities for the execution of sentences.

== Background ==
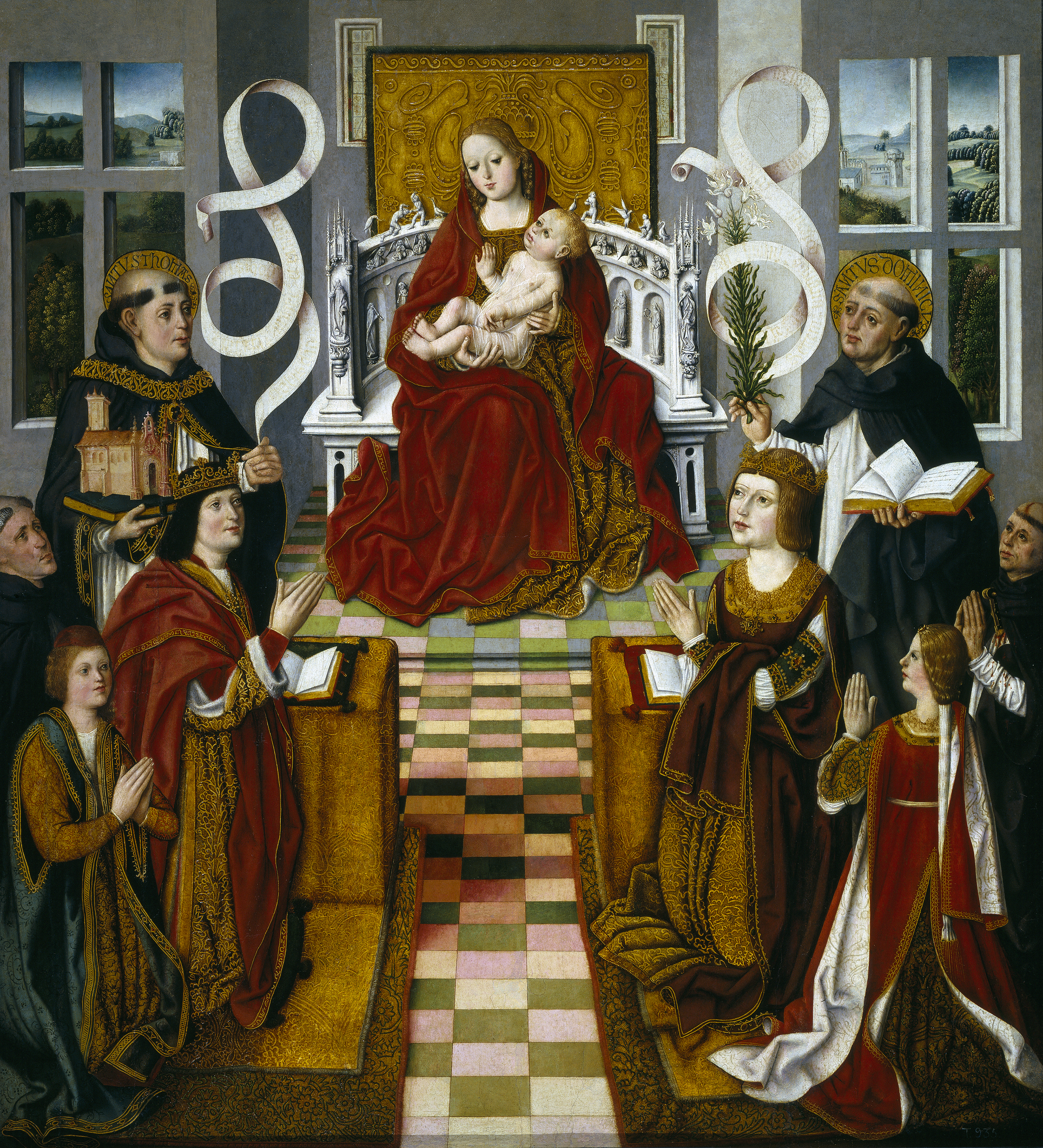
The Virgin of the Catholic Monarchs, 1491–1493. The Inquisitor, Torquemada, is behind King Ferdinand (left).

Roman Emperor Constantine legalized Christianity in 313 with the Edict of Milan. Persecuted under previous emperors, the new religion persecuted heterodox beliefs, such as Arianism, Manichaeism, Gnosticism, Adamites, Donatists, Pelagians, and Priscillianists. In 380, Emperor Theodosius I established Nicene Christianity as the state church of the Roman Empire. It condemned other Christian creeds as heresies and approved their repression. In 438, under Emperor Theodosius II, Codex Theodosianus (Theodosian Code) provided for property confiscation and execution for heretics.

Following the conversion of Spain's Visigoth royal family to Catholicism in 587, the situation for Jews deteriorated as the monarchy and church aligned to consolidate the realm under the new religion. The Church's Councils of Toledo imposed restrictions, including prohibitions on intermarriage and holding office, culminating in King Sisebut's 613 decree demanding conversion or expulsion, which led many Jews to flee or convert. Despite brief periods of tolerance, subsequent rulers and church councils intensified persecution, banning all Jewish rites, forcing baptisms, seizing property, enslaving Jews (after accusations of conspiracy in 694), taking children away from Jewish parents, and imposing severe economic hardships. This oppression alienated the Jewish population, causing some to welcome the Muslim invasion in 711.

While Muslims in the Holy Land were the primary targets of the Crusades, other perceived enemies of Christianity soon became targets. In 1184 Pope Lucius III created the Episcopal Inquisition to combat Catharism in southern France. Heretics were to be handed over to secular authorities for punishment, have their property seized, and face excommunication. When this failed to stem the heresy, Pope Innocent III called forth the Albigensian Crusade. The Crusaders killed 200,000 to 1,000,000 Cathars, perpetrated massacres (e.g. at Béziers), and burned hundreds at the stake. It was the start of a centralization in the fight against heresy, The Dominican Order was established to preach against the heresy, later serving as inquisitor throughout Europe. In 1252 Pope Innocent IV issued the bull Ad extirpanda, authorizing inquisitors to use torture against heretics.

European Jews became targets, leading to massacres and expulsions. While papal bulls sought to shield Jews from violence, starting in the twelfth century papal bulls also prohibited Jews from holding public office, required them to wear distinctive badges, ordered the burning of the Talmud, limited their employment, confined Jews to ghettos, and expelled them from the Papal States, along with other restrictions aimed at subordinating Jews. In 1231 Pope Gregory IX expanded the Papal Inquisition to Aragon. Cathars, Jewish converts and others deemed heretics were targeted, with trials, imprisonments and executions. Books by Spanish friars attacked Jews and Muslims. In Castile the Church Synod of Zamora protested rights granted to Jews by the king. Calls for restrictions on Spanish Jews were made by Popes and Cortes (assemblies of the Church, nobles and cities). Some kings protected Jews, since they benefited from Jews' taxes, and Jews serving as courtiers and tax collectors. Others, like Alfonso X, Sancho IV and Henry II, restricted Jews and exploited anti-Jewish sentiment for political gain.

The Shepherds' Crusade of 1320, started to help reconquer Spain from the Muslims, instead killed hundreds of Jews in France and Spain. In 1328, mobs inflamed by the sermons of Franciscan preacher Pedro Olligoyen massacred several Jewish communities in Navarre. Years of virulent anti-Jewish preaching by Ferrand Martínez, Archdeacon of Ecija, climaxed in the massacres of 1391 when riots broke out in Seville, Barcelona, Valencia, Toledo, Mallorca and elsewhere, killing thousands of Jews. To save themselves, some fled, mainly to North Africa, while an estimated 100,000, or one half of all Spanish Jews, converted to Catholicism. Following anti-Jewish riots in 1435 in Mallorca, Papal Inquisitor Antonio Murta played a key role in forced conversions of local Jews. The converts were called conversos. While mostly poor or of modest means, some conversos became successful in government and commerce, drawing resentment. Conversos were also suspected of continuing to practice Judaism in secret. Periods of stress, food shortages, plague and inflation led to attacks on conversos—in 1449 in Toledo (conversos were tortured and burned alive there), in 1462 in Carmona, again in Toledo in 1467, etc. In Cordoba in 1473 mobs killed conversos, regardless of sex and age, burning and looting their homes.

== Activity of the Inquisition ==
=== Start of the Inquisition against Jewish conversos ===
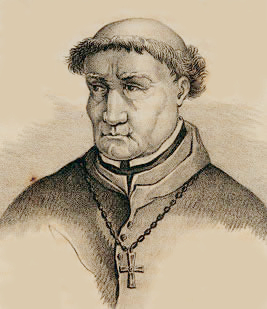
Torquemada is buried in the monastery of Saint Thomas at Ávila, and left his own epitaph Pestem Fugat Haereticam, meaning "drove away the pestilence of heresy".

During her stay in Seville between 1477 and 1478, (Note: The terms "converso" and "crypto-Jew" are somewhat vexed, and occasionally historians are not clear on how precisely they are intended to be understood. For the purpose of clarity, "converso" will be taken to mean one who has sincerely renounced Judaism or Islam and embraced Catholicism. Crypto-Jew will be taken to mean one who accepts Christian baptism yet continues to practice Judaism.) Queen Isabella was convinced of the existence of Crypto-Judaism among Andalusian conversos. A report, produced by Pedro González de Mendoza, Archbishop of Seville, and by the Dominican Tomás de Torquemada, confessor to Ferdinand and Isabella, corroborated this assertion. The Catholic monarchs requested a papal bull to establish an inquisition in Spain. In 1478 Pope Sixtus IV granted the bull Exigit sincerae devotionis affectus, to deal with those who had been baptized, but "revert to the rites and customs of the Jews and to keep the dogmas and precepts of the Jewish superstition and perfidy. ... Not only do they themselves persist in their own blindness, but also some who are born of them and some who associate with them are poisoned by their perfidy." To "expel this perfidy", "to convert the infidels to the proper faith", and punish all those "guilty of such crimes along with their harborers and followers", the bull permitted the monarchs to select and appoint three bishops or priests to act as inquisitors.

The first two inquisitors, the Dominicans Miguel de Morillo and Juan de San Martín were named two years later, on 27 September 1480. The first auto de fé execution was held in Seville on 6 February 1481: six people were burned alive. Thousands of conversos fled in terror, depopulating large parts of the country, hurting commerce. Government revenues declined, but the Queen was interested in "the purity of her lands", stating, per the chronicler Hernando del Pulgar, "the essential thing was to cleanse the country of that sin of heresy".

The scale of the operations required more resources. Accordingly, in February 1481, Pope Sixtus IV appointed seven more inquisitors, all Dominican friars. One of them was Tomás de Torquemada. The Inquisition grew rapidly in the Kingdom of Castile. By 1492, tribunals existed in eight Castilian cities: Ávila, Córdoba, Jaén, Medina del Campo, Segovia, Sigüenza, Toledo, and Valladolid. In 1482 Ferdinand sought to take over the existing Papal Inquisition in Aragon, which led to resistance since it infringed on local rights. Relatives and others complained of the brutality to the Pope, who wanted to maintain control of the inquisition.

On 18 April 1482, Pope Sixtus IV promulgated what historian Henry Charles Lea called "the most extraordinary bull in the history of the Inquisition", Ad Perpetuam Rei memoriam, affirming:

... in Aragon, Valencia, Mallorca and Catalonia the Inquisition has for some time been moved not by zeal for the faith and the salvation of souls, but by lust for wealth, and that many true and faithful Christians, on the testimony of enemies, rivals, slaves and other lower and even less proper persons, have without any legitimate proof been thrust into secular prisons, tortured and condemned as relapsed heretics, deprived of their goods and property and handed over to the secular arm to be executed, to the peril of souls, setting a pernicious example, and causing disgust to many.

Historian Henry Charles Lea wrote that the Pope sought to treat heresy like as other crimes. According to A History of the Jewish People,

In 1482 the pope was still trying to maintain control over the Inquisition and to gain acceptance for his own attitude towards the New Christians which was generally more moderate than that of the Inquisition and the local rulers.

Outraged, Ferdinand feigned doubt about the bull's veracity, arguing that no sensible pope would have published such a document. He wrote the pope on 13 May 1482, saying: "Take care therefore not to let the matter go further, and to revoke any concessions and entrust us with the care of this question." The Pope suspended the bull, then switched to full cooperation, by issuing a new bull on October 17, 1483, with which he appointed Torquemada Inquisitor General of Aragon, Catalonia and Valencia, thus uniting all Spanish activity under a single leader. Setting to work immediately, they burned the first converses at the stake in Aragon in 1484. Opposition continued in Aragon and Catalonia, which sought to maintain local control. Pope Innocent VIII then resolved the issue by withdrawing all papal inquisitors from Aragon and Catalonia, thus relinquishing full control to Torquemada, specifying that all appeals be addressed by Torquemada.

The Spanish Inquisition later expanded to other territories under the Spanish Crown – Navarre, Southern Italy, including Sicily and Sardinia, and Central and South America, with tribunals in Lima, Peru, Mexico City and Cartagena (present-day Colombia).

=== Trials ===
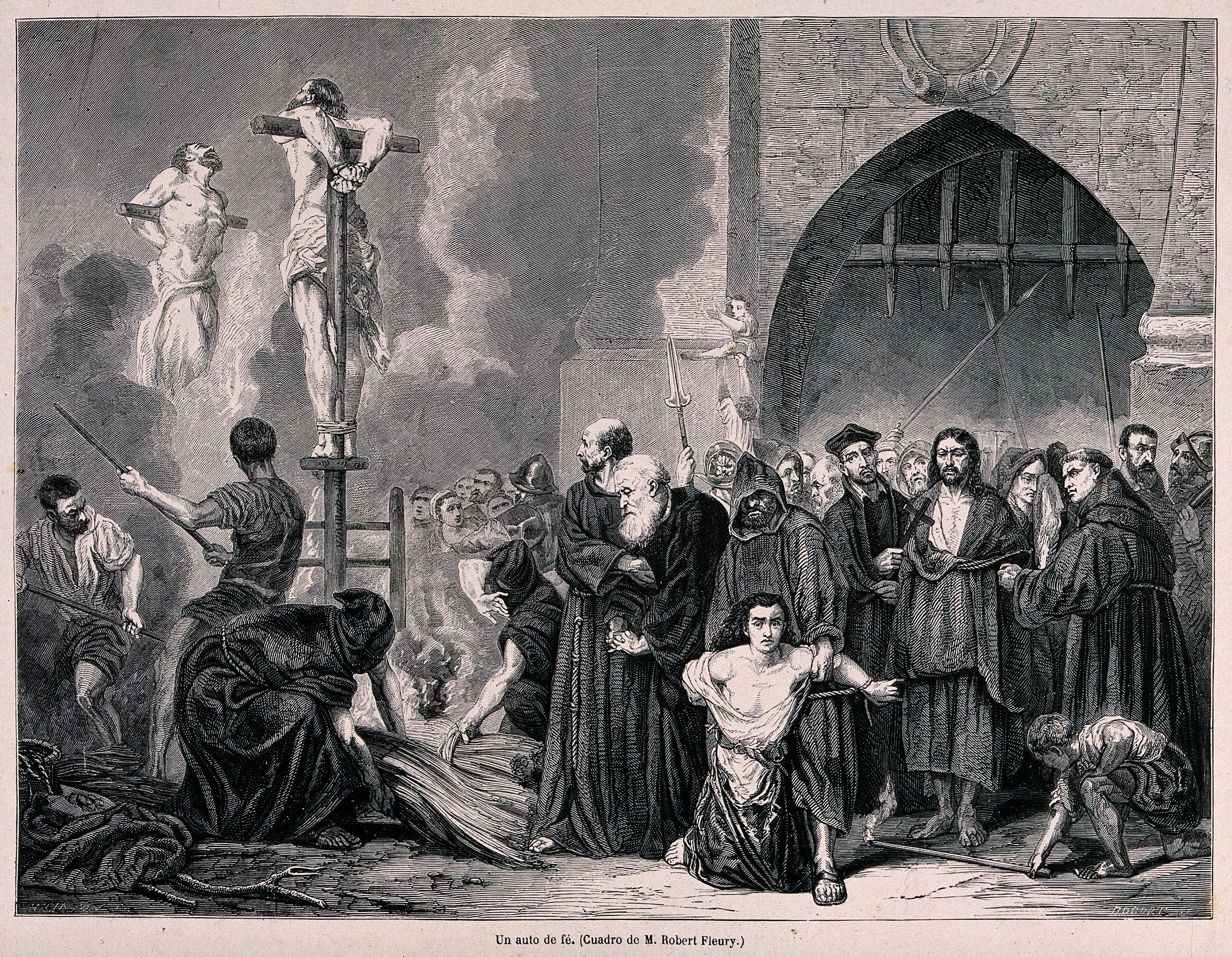
Burning of heretics at stakes (auto-da-fé) in a marketplace during the Spanish Inquisition.

Tomás de Torquemada established Inquisition procedures in 1484, creating a 28-article code, Compilación de las instrucciones del oficio de la Santa Inquisición, based on Nicholas Eymerich's Directorium Inquisitorum. That code remained largely unchanged for over three centuries. The state deemed heresy to be treason, punishable by death. Courts announced a 30-day grace period for self-confessions and denunciations, requiring individuals to report themselves and others, including relatives and friends, for attending Jewish prayer meetings. Inquisitors collected accusations from neighbors. Signs of crypto-Judaism included no chimney smoke on Saturdays, buying many vegetables before Passover, or purchasing meat from a converted butcher. Courts presumed the accused guilty, withholding accusers' identities. Trials aimed to extract confessions, often using water torture, the rack, or suspending individuals by their wrists with weights tied to their feet, repeatedly raising and dropping them.

Confessions occurred publicly at autos-da-fé. Legal expert Francisco Peña stated in 1578 that trials and executions aimed to ensure public good and instill fear, requiring public sentencing "for education and to terrify". These ceremonies rivaled bullfights in popularity. In 1680, King Charles II marked his marriage with an auto-da-fé in Madrid, drawing 50,000 spectators and sentencing 118 individuals, mostly Jewish conversos, to severe penalties, including execution by burning. Confessed individuals faced punishments like penance, public flogging, exile, or servitude as galley slaves, common in the 16th century. Others received prison sentences, from years to life, with near universal property confiscation, even for repentant heretics.

Between 1536 and 1543, eight courts seized 87 million maravedis from victims. Reconciled individuals could not hold public or church positions, nor work as tax collectors, pharmacists, or doctors, with restrictions extending to their descendants. Non-confessors or relapsed individuals faced death. The Inquisition peaked from 1480 to 1530, with estimates of 2,000 executions, mostly Jewish conversos. In Valencia, 91.6% of those judged between 1484 and 1530 were of Jewish origin, and 99.3% in Barcelona from 1484 to 1505. From 1531 to 1560, converso trials dropped to 3%. Persecutions rose again after discovering crypto-Jews in Quintanar de la Orden in 1588 and denunciations increased in the 1590s.

In the early 17th century, some conversos returned from Portugal, escaping its Inquisition. Spanish Inquisitor General Antonio Zapata and others reported "strong evidence of Judaism", prompting more trials, including financiers and artisans. The 1680 Madrid auto-da-fé sentenced 118, with 21, mostly immigrant Jewish conversos, executed. Dominican Thomas Navarro's sermon blamed Jews for denying Christ, using medieval anti-Jewish arguments and racist terms like "stubborn nation" and "perfidious", tied to blood purity concepts. In 1691, Mallorca's autos-da-fé burned 37 chuetas, or local conversos, alive. Accusations of conversos declined in the 18th century. Manuel Santiago Vivar, tried in Córdoba in 1818, was the last prosecuted for crypto-Judaism.

=== Expulsion of Jews and Jewish conversos ===
The Spanish Inquisition aimed to prevent conversos from practicing Judaism. Torquemada persuaded the monarchs that unbaptized Jews remained a threat, leading to the 1492 Alhambra Decree expelling all Jews. The decree stated that Christian-Jewish interactions caused "great harm" to Christians through contact and communication. It ordered all Jews, regardless of age, to leave the kingdom and never return, under penalty of death and property confiscation. Assisting or sheltering Jews incurred severe penalties, including loss of possessions and titles. Estimates of expelled Jews vary. Early accounts by Juan de Mariana speaks of 800,000 people, and Don Isaac Abravanel claimed 300,000, while modern estimates, based on tax returns and population data, suggest 80,000 Jews and 200,000 conversos lived in Spain, with about 40,000 emigrating. Joseph Pérez estimates 50,000 to 100,000 expelled.

Expelled Jews, known as Sephardic Jews, from Castile mainly fled to Portugal, where forced conversion occurred in 1497, followed by expulsions under the Portuguese Inquisition. Others, called Megorashim ("expelled" in Hebrew), migrated to Morocco and North Africa. Jews from Aragon often went to Italy, not Muslim lands. Sicily, under Spanish rule, with 25,000–37,000 Jews, also faced expulsions in 1492. After Spain annexed Naples, Apulia and Calabria (1510–1535), Jews there were expelled. Many settled in the Ottoman Empire, particularly Thessaloniki, where expellees built synagogues named after Castile, Aragon, and Catalonia in 1492–1493, with three more added by 1502 for those expelled from Spanish-controlled Sicily, Apulia, and Calabria. Most conversos assimilated into Catholic culture, but a minority secretly practiced Judaism, gradually migrating to Europe, North Africa, and the Ottoman Empire, often joining existing Sephardic communities. Persecution of conversos peaked in 1530, followed by blood purity laws (limpieza de sangre), introducing racial discrimination and antisemitism that persisted into the 19th and 20th centuries. Jews could return to Spain in 1868 under a new constitutional monarchy that allowed religious diversity, but the expulsion decree remained until 1968, limiting communal Jewish practice.

=== Expulsion of Muslim conversos ===
The Inquisition targeted Moriscos, converts from Islam, for suspected secret practice of their former faith. A decree on 14 February 1502 forced Muslims in Granada to convert to Christianity or face expulsion. In the Crown of Aragon, most Muslims faced this choice after the Revolt of the Brotherhoods (1519–1523). Expulsion enforcement varied, often ignored in interior and northern regions where Moriscos, protected by locals, had coexisted for over five centuries. Moriscos were suspected of aiding Barbary pirates backed by Spain's enemy, the Ottoman Empire, who regularly raided the coast.

The War of the Alpujarras (1568–1571), a Muslim and Morisco uprising in Granada anticipating Ottoman support, led to the forced dispersal of about half the region's Moriscos across Castile and Andalusia, heightening Spanish authorities' suspicions. Many Moriscos guarded their domestic privacy, fueling suspicions of secret Islamic practices. Unlike crypto-Jews, Moriscos initially faced evangelization rather than harsh persecution. Absent records, the Inquisition deemed all Moors baptized, thus Moriscos, subject to its authority. A 1526 decree allowed 40 years of religious instruction before prosecution. Fifty Moriscos were executed before clarification. Moriscos, often poor, rural, Arabic-speaking laborers, received limited Church education efforts. In Valencia and Aragon, noble jurisdiction protected many Moriscos, as persecution threatened the economy.

Late in Philip II's reign, tensions escalated. The 1568–1570 Morisco Revolt in Granada faced harsh suppression, and the Inquisition intensified focus on Moriscos. From 1560 to 1571, Moriscos comprised 82% of Granada's tribunal cases, dominating tribunals in Zaragoza and Valencia. They faced less severe treatment than Judaizing conversos or Protestants, with fewer executions. In 1609, King Philip III, advised by the Duke of Lerma and Archbishop Juan de Ribera, ordered the Moriscos' expulsion. Ribera cited Old Testament texts urging the destruction of God's enemies to justify the decree. The edict mandated Moriscos leave under penalty of death and confiscation, taking only what they could carry, without money, bullion, jewels, or bills of exchange. Estimates suggest 300,000 Moriscos, or 4% of Spain's population, were expelled, though Trevor J. Dadson argues the impact was less severe in many regions. Valencia, with high ethnic tensions, suffered economic collapse and depopulation.

Most expelled Moriscos settled in the Maghreb or Barbary Coast. Those avoiding expulsion or returning assimilated into the dominant culture. At the Inquisition's peak, Morisco cases comprised under 10% of trials. In 1621, Philip IV ordered a halt to harsh measures against Moriscos. In 1628, the Council of the Supreme Inquisition instructed Seville inquisitors to prosecute expelled Moriscos only for significant disturbances. The last major prosecution for crypto-Islamic practices occurred in Granada in 1727, with most receiving light sentences. By the late 18th century, indigenous Islamic practices had ceased in Spain.

=== Blood purity ===
During the Spanish Inquisition, limpieza de sangre (blood purity statutes) targeted Jewish and Muslim converts to Christianity, introducing race-based discrimination and antisemitism. Toledo enacted the first statute in 1449 after anti-converso riots and killings. That statute barred conversos or those with converted parents or grandparents from holding public or private office or testifying in court. In 1496, Pope Alexander VI approved a purity statute for the Hieronymites. Religious and military orders, guilds, and other groups added bylaws requiring proof of "clean blood." Converso families faced discrimination or resorted to bribing officials and forging documents to claim Christian ancestry.

By 1530, Inquisition tribunals required towns to maintain genealogy registers, labeling married men and their families as Old Christians or conversos, marking them as "pure" or "impure." Investigations and trials followed if individuals lacked proof of pure lineage or faced suspicion of lying. By the 16th century, these statutes systematically excluded conversos from Church and state roles, fostering fear, hostile witnesses, and perjury. A single Jewish ancestor could cost a family everything, laying the groundwork for race-based antisemitism.

These statutes hindered Spaniards emigrating to the Americas, as proof of no recent Muslim or Jewish ancestry was required for travel to the Spanish Empire. In 1593, the Jesuits adopted the Decree de genere, barring those with any Jewish or Muslim ancestry, however distant, from joining the Society of Jesus, applying Spain's blood purity principle globally. Blood purity tests declined by the 18th century, but persisted into the 19th century in some areas. In Mallorca, no Xueta (descendants of Mallorcan Jewish conversos) priests could perform Mass in a cathedral until the 1960s.

=== Christian heretics ===
==== Protestantism ====
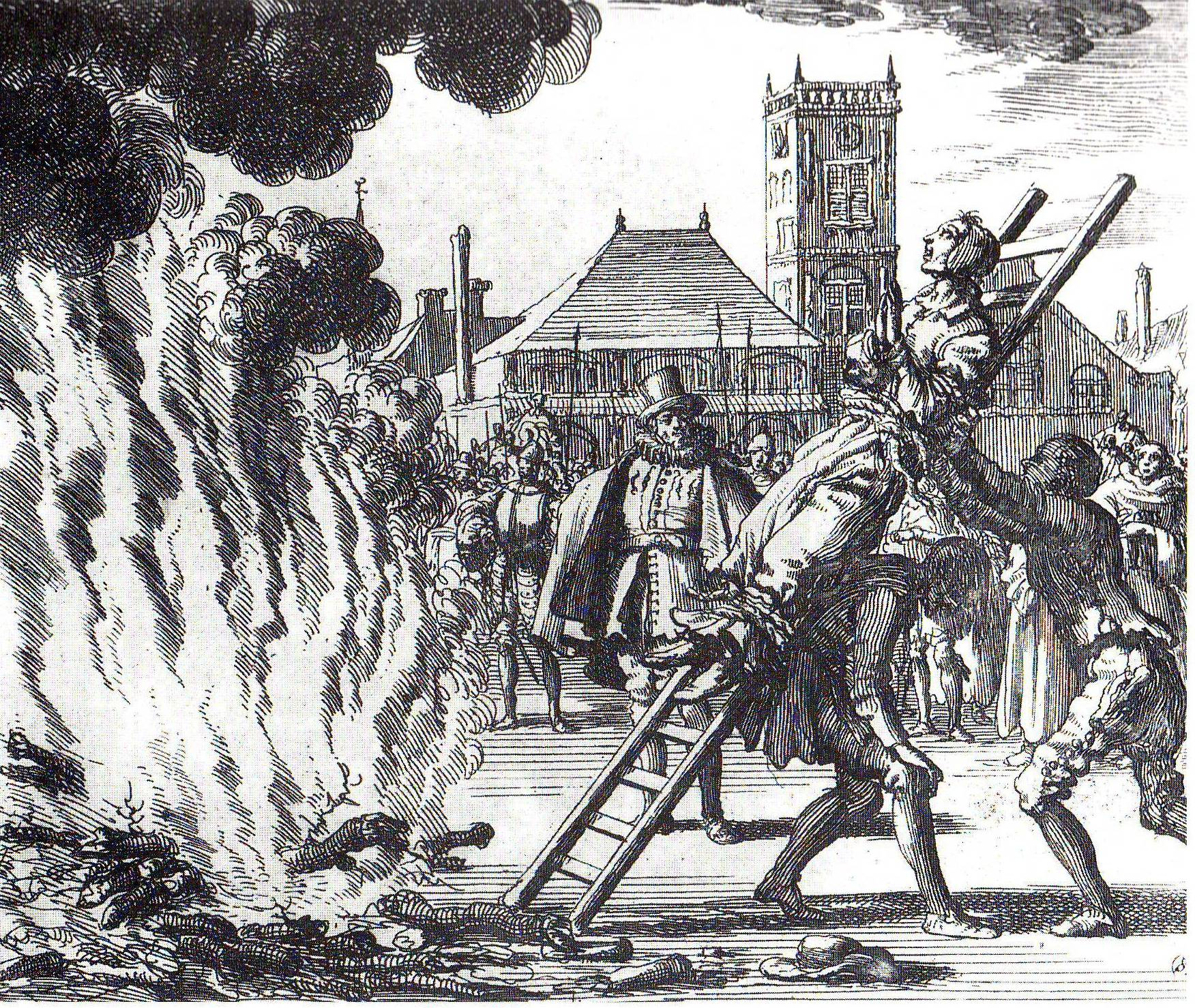
The burning of a Dutch Anabaptist, Anneken Hendriks, who was charged with heresy in Amsterdam (1571)

The Spanish Inquisition rarely targeted Protestants due to their limited presence. It labeled anyone offending the Church as "Lutheran." Early trials focused on the Alumbrados, a mystical sect in Guadalajara and Valladolid, leading to long prison sentences but no executions. These cases prompted the Inquisition to pursue intellectuals and clerics influenced by Erasmian ideas, diverging from orthodoxy. Charles I and Philip II admired Erasmus.

From 1558 to 1562, under Philip II, the Inquisition prosecuted Protestant communities in Valladolid and Seville, totaling about 120 people. (Note: These trials, especially in Valladolid, inspired The Heretic: A Novel of the Inquisition by Miguel Delibes (Overlook: 2006).) That period saw heightened Inquisition activity, with several autos de fe, some attended by royalty, resulting in about 100 executions. Henry Kamen notes that from 1559 to 1566, Spain executed around 100 for heresy, compared to twice as many in England under Mary Tudor, three times as many in France, and ten times as many in the Low Countries. These mid-century autos de fe nearly eliminated Spanish Protestantism, a small movement initially.

After 1562, repression lessened, though trials continued. In the late 16th century, about 200 Spaniards faced Protestantism accusations. Most were not actual Protestants; inquisitors or accusers marked irreligious acts, drunken mockery, or anticlerical comments as "Lutheran". Disrespecting church images or eating meat on forbidden days also indicated heresy. Roughly 12 Spaniards were burned for Protestantism during that time. The Inquisition often treated Protestantism as a sign of foreign influence or political disloyalty rather than a religious issue.

==== Orthodox Christianity ====
Even though the Inquisition had theoretical permission to investigate Orthodox schismatics, it rarely did. No major war came between Spain and any Orthodox country, lacking reasons to do so. One casualty was tortured by "Jesuits" (though most likely Franciscans) who administered the Spanish Inquisition in North America, according to authorities within the Eastern Orthodox Church: St. Peter the Aleut. Even that single report has various inaccuracies that make it problematic, and confirmation in the Inquisitorial archives.

==== Freemasonry ====
The Roman Catholic Church has regarded Freemasonry as heretical since about 1738; the suspicion of Freemasonry was potentially a capital offence. Spanish Inquisition records reveal two prosecutions in Spain and only a few more throughout the Spanish Empire. In 1815, Francisco Javier de Mier y Campillo, the Inquisitor General of the Spanish Inquisition and the Bishop of Almería, suppressed Freemasonry and denounced the lodges as "societies which lead to atheism, to sedition and to all errors and crimes." He then instituted a purge during which Spaniards could be arrested on the charge of being "suspected of Freemasonry".

=== Political misuse ===
When Philip II tried to prosecute his secretary Antonio Pérez, Pérez escaped From Castile to Aragon, where he had friends and supporters. He managed to frame his persecution by the king as a royal trespass on the customs and freedoms of the kingdom of Aragon. In 1591, the king tried to override the obstruction by the Aragonese institutions, and since the Inquisition had jurisdiction over all his kingdoms, charges of heresy were fabricated against the escapee. Pérez was transferred from the Aragonese-run manifestados prison to the inquisitorial prison at the Aljafería fortress. This resulted in riots and Pérez's final escape abroad.

=== Censorship ===
As part of the Counter-Reformation, the Spanish Inquisition issued "Indexes" of prohibited books to curb heretical ideas. Other places in Europe had similar lists a decade before the Inquisition's first, published in 1551, a reprint of the 1550 University of Leuven Index. Further Spanish Indexes appeared in 1559, 1583, 1612, 1632, and 1640. The 1559 Index spanned 72 pages, while the 1667 Novus Index Prohibitorum et Expurgatorum reached 1300 pages. The Catholic Church's Index Librorum Prohibitorum banned thousands of books from 1560 to 1966.

Some notable Spanish literature works, mostly plays and religious texts, appeared in the Indexes. Several religious writers, now considered saints, had works listed. In early modern Spain, books required prepublication approval from secular and religious authorities, sometimes with modifications. Even approved texts faced later censorship, occasionally decades after publication. As Catholic theology evolved, some texts were removed from the Index. Initially, inclusion meant total prohibition, but this proved impractical and counterproductive for educating clergy. Inquisition officials began expurgating texts by blotting out specific words or passages, allowing these versions to circulate. Some historians argue that strict control was unenforceable, permitting more cultural freedom than commonly thought. Irving Leonard revealed that romances like Amadis of Gaul reached the New World despite royal bans, with Inquisition approval. In the 18th century, the Age of Enlightenment led to more licenses for possessing prohibited texts.

The Inquisition's censorship did not halt the Siglo de Oro, though many major authors, including Bartolomé Torres Naharro, Juan del Enzina, Jorge de Montemayor, Juan de Valdés, Lope de Vega, the anonymous Lazarillo de Tormes, and Hernando del Castillo's Cancionero General, appeared on the Index. La Celestina faced expurgation in 1632 and a full ban in 1790. Non-Spanish authors like Ovid, Dante, Rabelais, Ariosto, Machiavelli, Erasmus, Jean Bodin, Valentine Naibod, and Tomás Moro were prohibited. A prominent case involved Fray Luis de León, a converso humanist and religious writer, imprisoned from 1572 to 1576 for translating the Song of Songs from Hebrew.

The Inquisition stifled free and scientific thought. One exiled Spaniard lamented, "Our country is a land of pride and envy ... barbarism; one cannot produce culture without suspicion of heresy, error, and Judaism". While Europe embraced the Enlightenment, Spain stagnated, though this view is debated. Censorship proved ineffective, as banned books circulated widely. The Inquisition rarely targeted scientists, and few scientific works appeared on the Index. Spain enjoyed more political freedom than other absolute monarchies from the 16th to 18th centuries, influenced by hermeticist religious ideas and early enlightened absolutism. The Index aimed to protect laypeople from misinterpreting symbolic or complex texts, not to condemn the works outright. Scholars often accessed these books freely, and most banned texts, carefully collected by Philip II and Philip III, remain in the Monasterio del Escorial library, accessible to intellectuals and clergy after Philip II's death. The Inquisition rarely intervened, though it occasionally urged the king to limit collecting grimoires or magic-related texts.

=== Offenses ===
In 15th-century Spain, no distinction existed between religious and civil law. Breaking a religious law equated to violating tax laws–the Inquisition did not distinguish them. It prosecuted crimes often unnoticed by the public, including domestic offenses, crimes against vulnerable groups, administrative violations, forgeries, organized crime, and offenses against the Crown. These crimes encompassed sexual and family-related offenses, including rape and sexual violence—which the Inquisition uniquely prosecuted nationwide—bestiality, pedophilia (often overlapping with sodomy), incest, child abuse, neglect, and bigamy. Non-religious offenses included procurement (not prostitution), human trafficking, smuggling, forgery of currency, documents, or signatures, tax fraud, illegal weapons, swindles, disrespect to the Crown or its institutions (including the Inquisition, church, guard, and kings), espionage, conspiracy, and treason.

Non-religious crimes formed a significant portion of Inquisition investigations, though distinguishing them from religious crimes in records is challenging, as no official divide existed. Many crimes fell under the same legal article; for instance, "sodomy" included pedophilia as a subtype, with some data on male homosexuality prosecutions actually reflecting pedophilia convictions. Religious and non-religious crimes, while distinct, were often treated equivalently. Public blasphemy and street swindling, both seen as misleading the public, received similar punishments. Likewise, counterfeiting currency and heretical proselytism, viewed as spreading falsifications, faced death penalties and similar subdivisions. Heresy and material forgeries were treated comparably, suggesting equivalence in the Inquisition's view. Trials were complicated by witnesses or victims adding charges, particularly witchcraft. As with Eleno de Céspedes, such accusations were typically dismissed but often appeared in investigation statistics.

==== Witchcraft and superstition ====
The Spanish Inquisition prosecuted witchcraft less intensely than France, Scotland, or Germany. A notable case involved the "witches" of Zugarramurdi in Navarre, persecuted during the Logroño witch trials. An auto de fe in Logroño on 7–8 November 1610 burned six people and another five in effigy. The Inquisition's role in witchcraft cases was limited, with secular authorities retaining jurisdiction over sorcery and witchcraft long after the Inquisition's establishment. The Inquisition generally viewed witchcraft as baseless superstition. After the Logroño trials, Alonso de Salazar Frías, who delivered the Edict of Faith across Navarre, reported to the Suprema that "neither witches nor bewitched existed in a village until they were discussed or written about."

==== Blasphemy ====
The Inquisition prosecuted verbal offenses as "heretical propositions" including outright blasphemy, questionable statements about religious beliefs, sexual morality, or clerical misconduct. Many faced trials for claiming that fornication was not sinful or doubting aspects of Christian faith, such as Transubstantiation or the virginity of Mary. Clergy occasionally faced accusations of such offenses. These cases rarely led to severe penalties.

==== Sodomy ====
In 1524, Pope Clement VII granted the Inquisition in Aragon jurisdiction over sodomy following a petition from the Zaragoza tribunal. Castile's Inquisition declined similar authority, creating a significant regional disparity. Within Aragon, prosecution varied by local law, with Zaragoza's tribunal notably harsh. In 1541, the Inquisition executed Salvador Vidal, a priest, for sodomy, marking the first known case. Convicted individuals faced penalties like fines, burning in effigy, public whipping, or galley service. Valencia recorded the first burning for sodomy in 1572. The term "sodomy" encompassed non-procreative sexual acts condemned by the Church, including coitus interruptus, masturbation, fellatio, and anal coitus, whether heterosexual or homosexual. A 1560 ruling excluded lesbian sex without a dildo from prosecution, but bestiality faced routine charges, especially in Zaragoza during the 1570s. Husbands also faced accusations for heterosexual sodomy with their wives.

Accused individuals included 19.0% clergy, 6.0% nobles, 37.0% workers, 19.0% servants, and 18.0% soldiers and sailors. Nearly all of the roughly 500 cases involved relationships between an older man and an adolescent, often coercive, with few involving consenting homosexual adults. About 100 cases alleged child abuse. Adolescents, especially those under twelve or victims of rape, typically received lighter punishment or none. Prosecutions declined after the Suprema limited publicity. After 1579, public autos de fe excluded sodomy convicts unless sentenced to death. After 1610, even death sentences avoided public announcement. In 1589, Aragon set the minimum age for sodomy executions at 25, and by 1633, such executions largely ceased.

==== Bigamy ====
The Inquisition prosecuted crimes against morals and social order, often clashing with civil tribunals. It frequently tried bigamy, common in a society allowing divorce (more accurately, annulment) only in extreme cases. Men convicted faced 200 lashes and five to ten years of "service to the Crown", typically five years as a galley oarsman for unskilled individuals—a potential death sentence due to harsh conditions or ten years unpaid work in a hospital or charitable institution for skilled workers such as doctors or lawyers. In Portugal, the penalty was five to seven years as an oarsman.

==== Unnatural marriage ====
The Inquisition classified marriages between individuals unable to procreate as "unnatural". The Catholic Church, particularly in war-torn Spain, prioritized reproduction in marriage. The policy applied equally to all, deeming non-reproductive marriages unnatural and reproductive ones natural, regardless of gender. Male sterility, caused by castration, war injuries (capón), or genetic conditions preventing puberty (lampiño), rendered a marriage unnatural. Female sterility, though harder to prove, also qualified. A notable case involving marriage, sex, and gender was the trial of Eleno de Céspedes.

== Organization ==
Beyond its role in religious affairs, the Inquisition was an institution at the service of the monarchy. The Inquisitor General, in charge of the Holy Office, was designated by the crown. He was the only public office whose authority stretched to all parts of the Spanish empire (including the American viceroyalties), except for a brief period (1507–1518) during which one Inquisitor General handled the kingdom of Castile, and another in Aragon.

=== Inquisitor General ===
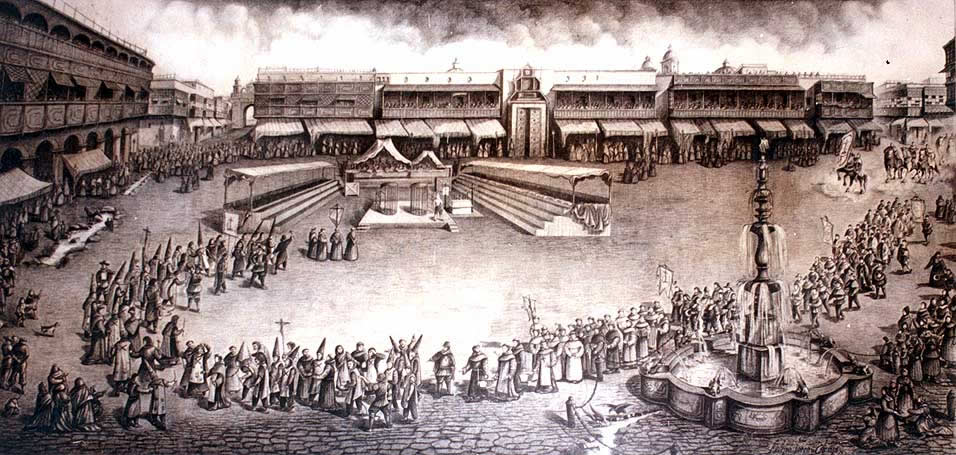
Auto de fe, Plaza Mayor in Lima, Viceroyalty of Peru (17th century)

The Inquisitor General presided over the Council of the Supreme and General Inquisition (commonly abbreviated as "Council of the Suprema"), created in 1483, which generally had six members (but as many as ten) named by the crown. Over time, the authority of the Suprema grew at the expense of the Inquisitor General.

=== The Council of Castile and the Council of the Supreme and General Inquisition ===
By the 17th century, two councilors from the Royal Council of Castile played a key role in overseeing the Council of the Spanish Inquisition, advising the monarchy on legal and religious matters. At this time, the Spanish Inquisition consisted of six primary councilors, two afternoon members from the Royal Council of Castile, and a permanent Dominican seat. Additionally, the fiscal (prosecutor) was responsible for managing inquisitorial trials and legal proceedings. With royal approval, the Council adjusted its structure to improve efficiency, including chamber divisions for handling cases. Notable members included:

- Joseph González, Commissary General of the Crusade, Councilor of Castile
- Juan Martínez, Dominican friar
- Diego Sarmiento de Valladares
- Gabriel de la Calle y Heredia
- Bernardino de León de la Rocha
- Francisco de Lara
- Martín de Castejón
- Doctor Gaspar de Medrano, the second-ranking Councilor of Castile

The Royal Council and the Inquisition remained deeply intertwined, enforcing religious conformity while serving as an instrument of monarchical control.

=== Schedule ===
The Suprema met every morning, except for holidays, and for two hours in the afternoon on Tuesdays, Thursdays, and Saturdays. The morning sessions were devoted to questions of faith, while the afternoons were reserved for "minor heresies", cases of unacceptable sexual behavior, bigamy, witchcraft, etc.

=== Tribunals ===
Below the Suprema were various tribunals tasked to combat heresy, initially itinerant, but later settled. During the first phase, numerous tribunals were established, but after 1495 tended to centralize.

In Castile, permanent tribunals of the Inquisition were established:

- 1482 In Seville and in Córdoba
- 1485 In Toledo and in Llerena
- 1488 In Valladolid and in Murcia
- 1489 In Cuenca
- 1505 In Las Palmas (Canary Islands)
- 1512 In Logroño
- 1526 In Granada
- 1574 In Santiago de Compostela

The four tribunals in the kingdom of Aragon were: Zaragoza and Valencia (1482), Barcelona (1484), and Mallorca (1488). Ferdinand the Catholic established a tribunal in Sicily (1513), housed in Palermo, and Sardinia, in the town of Sassari. (Note: In Sicily, the Inquisition functioned until 30 March 1782, when it was abolished by King Ferdinand IV of Naples. It is estimated that 200 people were executed during this period.) In the Americas, tribunals were established in Lima and in Mexico City (1569) and, in 1610, in Cartagena (present-day Colombia).

== Composition of the tribunals ==
Structure of the Spanish Inquisition

Each tribunal initially comprised two inquisitors, calificadores (theologians), an alguacil (bailiff), and a fiscal (prosecutor), with other roles added as the institution evolved. Inquisitors were preferably jurists rather than theologians; in 1608, Philip III required all inquisitors to have a legal background. They typically served short terms, averaging about two years in the Court of Valencia, for example. Most belonged to the secular clergy and held university degrees.

The fiscal presented accusations, investigated denunciations, and interrogated witnesses, often using physical or mental torture. Calificadores, usually theologians, determined if a defendant's conduct constituted a crime against faith. Expert jurist consultants advised on procedural matters. The court employed three secretaries: the notario de secuestros (Notary of Property), who recorded the accused's possessions upon detention; the notario del secreto (Notary of the Secret), who documented testimonies; and the Escribano General (General Notary), who served as court secretary. The alguacil detained, jailed, and tortured defendants. Other staff included the nuncio, who announced court notices, and the alcaide, who managed prisoner care.

Two auxiliary roles supported the Holy Office: familiares and comissarios. Familiares, lay collaborators, served permanently, and their role was an honor, signifying limpieza de sangre (Old Christian status) and granting privileges. Most were commoners, though some were nobles. Comissarios were members of religious orders who assisted occasionally. One of the most striking aspects of the organization was its form of financing: without a defined budget, the Inquisition depended almost exclusively on the confiscation of the goods of the denounced. Many of those prosecuted were rich men. The situation was open to abuse, as evidenced in a memorandum that a converso from Toledo directed to Charles I:

Your Majesty must provide, before all else, that the expenses of the Holy Office do not come from the properties of the condemned, because if that is the case if they do not burn they do not eat.

== Mode of operation ==
=== Accusation ===
Upon arriving in a city, the Inquisition issued the Edict of Grace. After Sunday Mass, the inquisitor read the edict, outlining possible heresies and urging the congregation to confess at the tribunals to "ease their consciences". These edicts, named for their grace period (typically 30–40 days), allowed self-accused individuals to reconcile with the Church without harsh penalties. The promise of leniency prompted many to come forward voluntarily, often encouraged to denounce others, making informants the Inquisition's main information source. After around 1500, Edicts of Faith replaced the Edicts of Grace, omitting the grace period and promoting denunciation of the guilty.

Denunciations were anonymous, leaving defendants unaware of their accusers' identities, a practice heavily criticized by opponents. False accusations were common, driven by motives beyond genuine concern, such as targeting nonconformists, harming neighbors, or eliminating rivals. That system turned everyone into a potential informer, elevating denunciation to a religious duty. It filled the nation with spies, making individuals objects of suspicion to neighbors, family, and strangers.

=== Detention ===
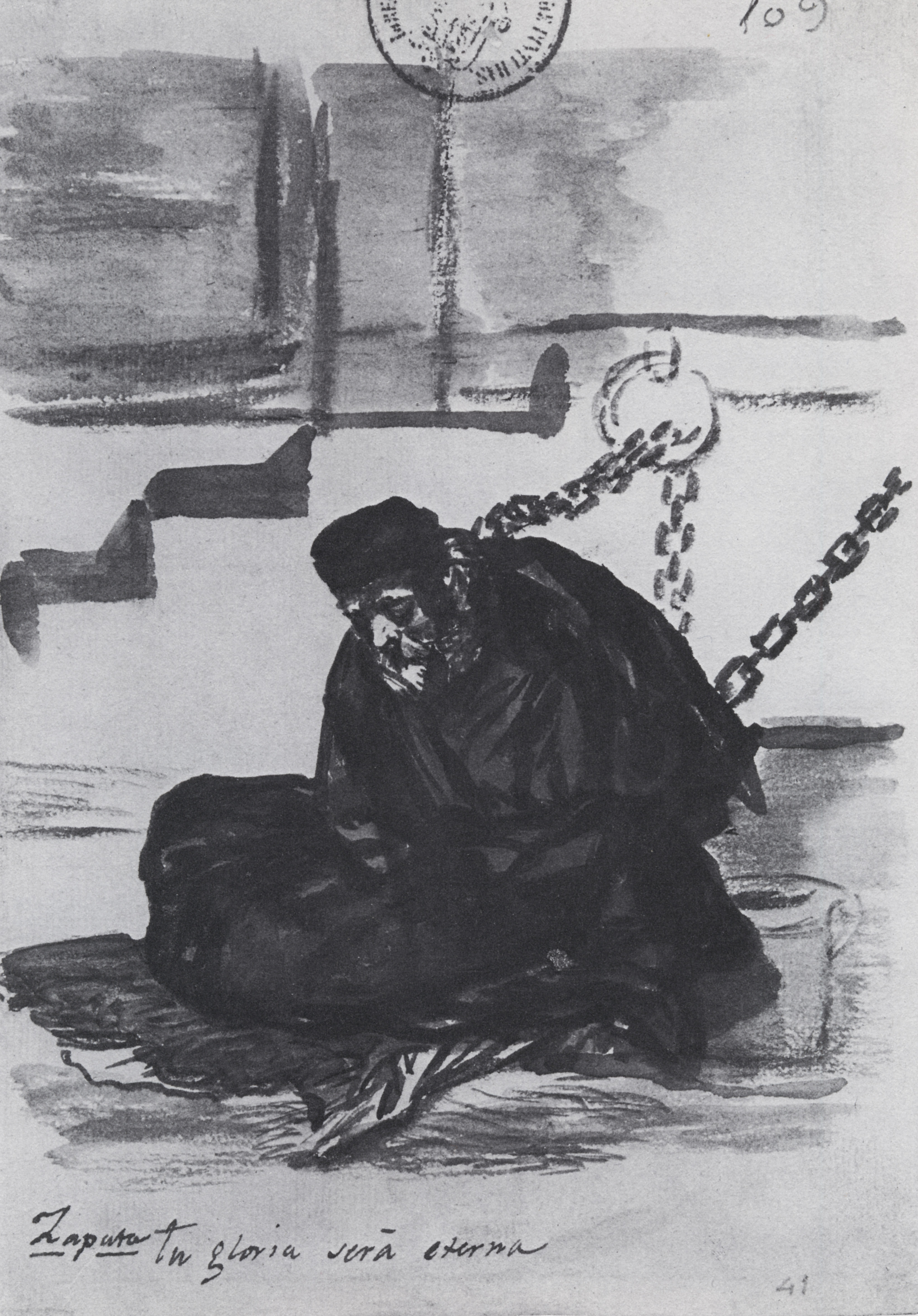
Diego Mateo López Zapata in his cell before his trial by the Inquisition Court of Cuenca (engraved by Francisco Goya)

After a denunciation, calificadores assessed whether heresy was involved, followed by the accused's detention. Apologist William Thomas Walsh noted that the process maintained strict secrecy, concealing accusations from both the public and the accused, who might never learn that that they had been suspected. Occasionally, individuals faced preventive detention, with some experiencing up to two years' imprisonment before examination. For example, in Valladolid's tribunal in 1699, suspects, including a 9-year-old girl and a 14-year-old boy, were jailed for up to two years without evaluation of their accusations.

The Inquisition seized the accused's property upon detention to cover its costs and their maintenance, frequently leaving relatives in poverty. Instructions issued in 1561 aimed to address that issue, but Llorente found no evidence of provisions for the children of condemned heretics. Prisoners remained isolated, barred from attending Mass or receiving sacraments. Inquisition jails were comparable to secular ones, although some accounts suggest they were significantly better.

=== Trial ===
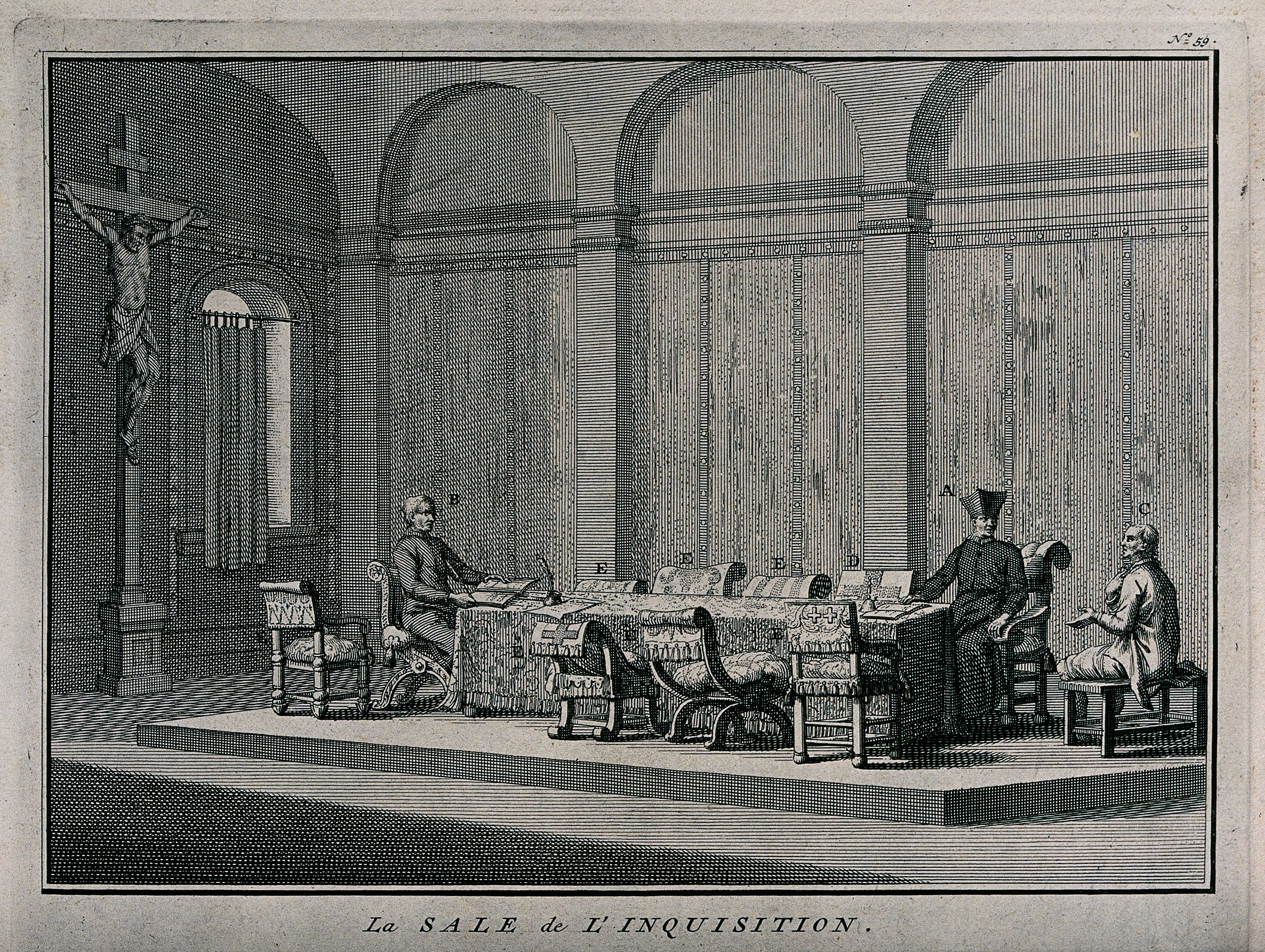
Two priests and a suspected heretic in a Spanish Inquisition interrogation chamber (Bernard Picart's engraving, 1722). In contrast to the Inquisitor's armchair, Eymeric's manual suggests that the accused be sat on a low bench.

At hearings, accusers and the defendant testified separately. The tribunal assigned a defense counsel, a lawyer, to advise the accused and encourage truthful testimony. Counsel had to abandon the defense upon realizing the client's guilt. The fiscal led the prosecution. The notario del secreto recorded the defendant's words during interrogation. Inquisition archives stand out for their thorough documentation compared to other judicial systems of the era. Defendants could defend themselves through abonos (securing favorable character witnesses) or tachas (proving accusers' witnesses, whose identities remained unknown, were untrustworthy or personal enemies).

Trial structure resembled later trials and, apologists claim, offered advanced fairness for the time. The Inquisition, professional and efficient, relied on the King's political power, without separation of powers. Apologists argue Inquisitorial tribunals were among early modern Europe's fairest for laymen trials. Former prisoners' testimonies suggest fairness faltered when national or political interests were at stake. Historian Walter Ullmann instead claimed, "Hardly any aspect of the Inquisitorial procedure aligns with justice; each element denies it or caricatures it ... its principles reject even the most basic concepts of natural justice ... That proceeding resembles no judicial trial but systematically perverts it.

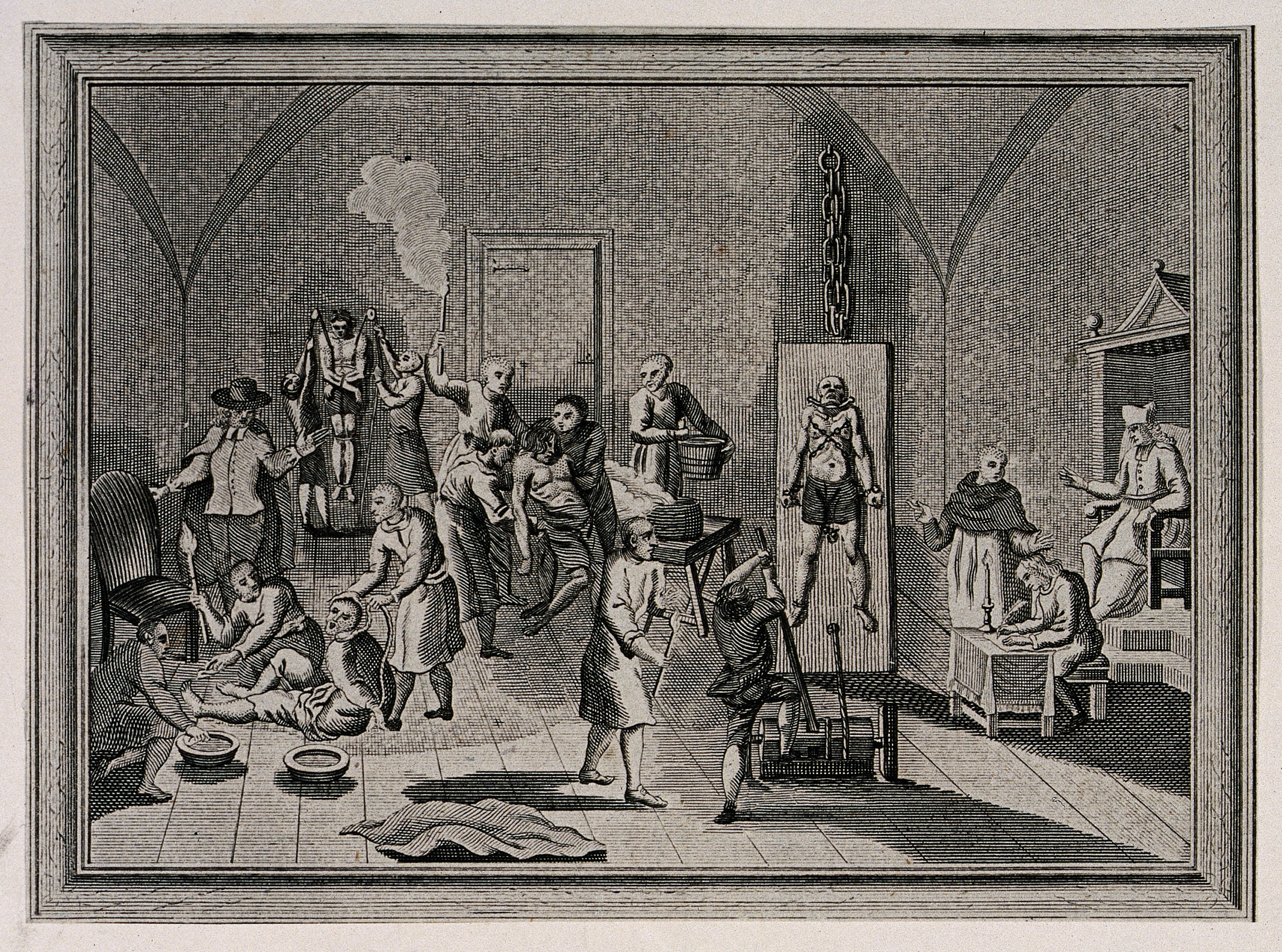
An etching of an imagined Inquisition jail, depicting a priest overseeing a scribe as prisoners are tortured on pulleys, racks, or with torches (date unknown)

The Inquisition used torture, per the instrucciones, to extract confessions or information. Its frequency across the period is disputed. Torture applied when heresy was "half proven" and could be repeated, per Article XV of Torquemada's instructions. Henry Lea estimated that the Toledo court tortured about 33.3% of those tried for Protestant heresy between 1575 and 1610. The Lima tribunal likely tortured nearly all accused in cases from 1635 to 1639; the Valladolid tribunal's 1624 report shows torture in eleven Jewish cases and one Protestant case; in 1655, all nine Jewish cases involved torture. Vatican Archives suggest lower numbers. Apologist Thomas Madden claimed, "The Inquisition brought order, justice, and compassion to counter widespread secular and popular persecutions of heretics", concluding, "The Spanish people loved their Inquisition. That explains its longevity." Torture proportions varied significantly across periods.

=== Torture ===
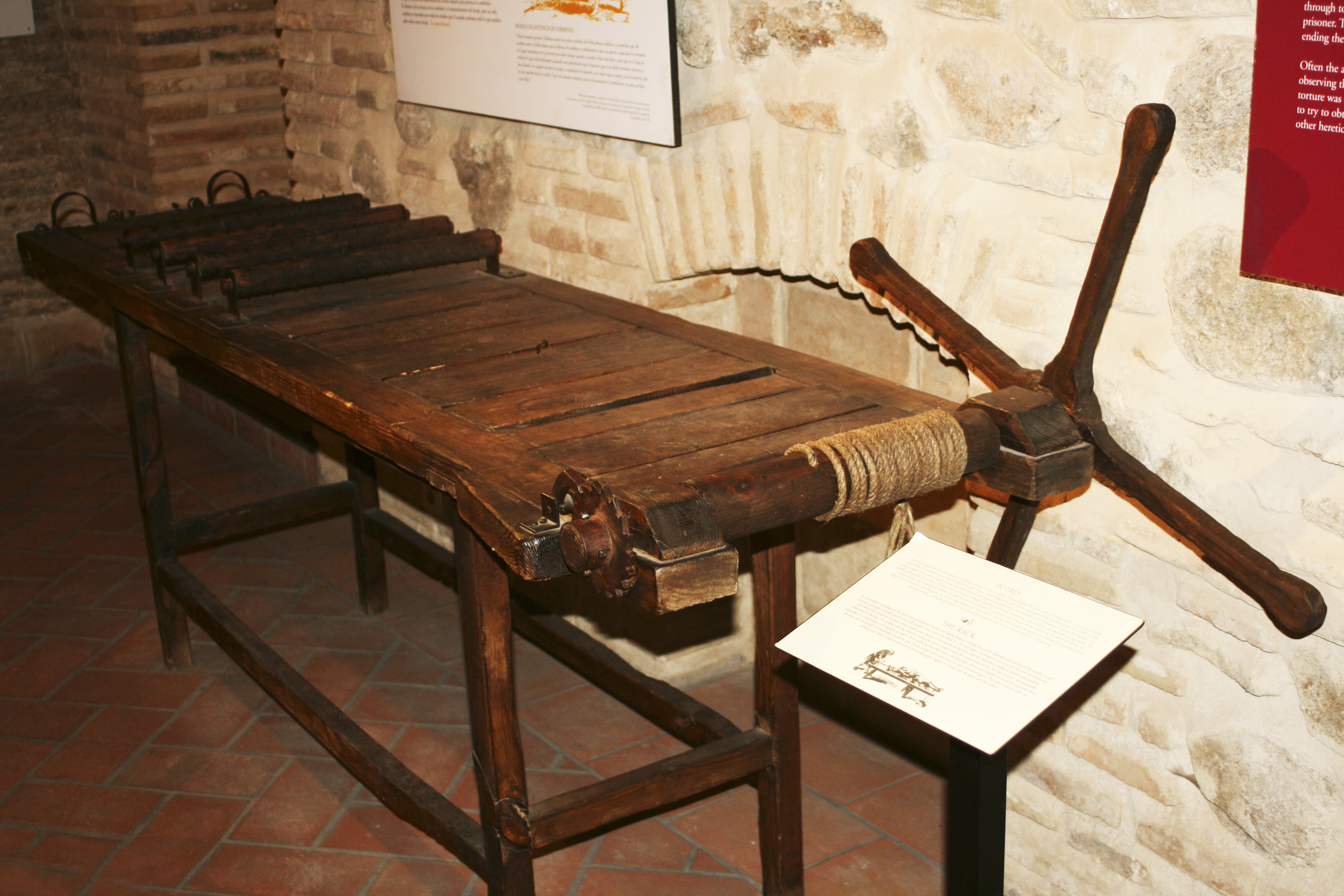
A rack on display at the Torture Museum in Toledo, Spain

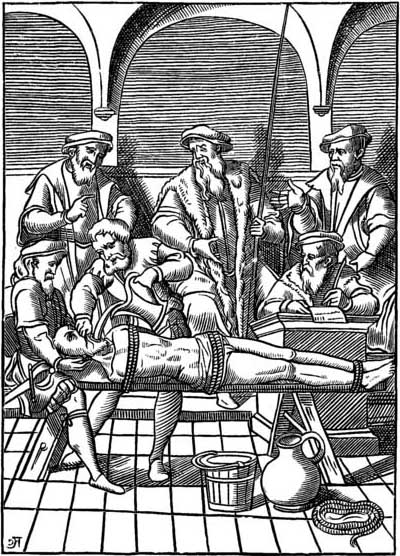
An engraved depiction of water torture (1556)

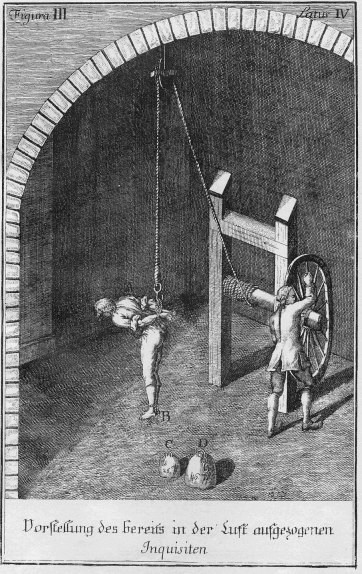
In the strappado torture, the victim's hands are tied behind their back and the body is suspended by the wrists, resulting in dislocated shoulders. Weights can be added to the feet (engraving, 1768)

Torture was applied in all European civil and religious trials. The Spanish Inquisition used it more restrictively than other courts, with strict regulations on timing, methods, targets, frequency, duration, and supervision. Haliczer and others claim that the Inquisition tortured less frequently and more cautiously than secular courts.

Kamen and others cited limited evidence of torture, based on newly opened Inquisition archives. Claims of widespread torture were claimed to stem from Protestant propaganda and popular misconceptions.

- When: Torture applied when guilt was "half proven" or presumed, per Article XV of Torquemada's instrucciones and Eymerich's directions. Eymerich noted that tortured confessions were unreliable and should be a last resort.
- What: The Inquisition could not "maim, mutilate, draw blood, or cause permanent damage." Church law banned ecclesiastical tribunals from shedding blood. Still, torture often caused broken limbs, health issues, or death.
- Supervision: A physician was typically present and had to certify the prisoner's health before torture, though harm still occurred.
- Permitted torture methods: garrucha, toca, and potro, also used in secular and ecclesiastical courts. The garrucha (or strappado) involved suspending victims by their wrists, tied behind their back, sometimes with weights on their feet, causing violent pulls and dislocations during lifts and drops.

The toca, or water interrogation (now waterboarding), forced victims to ingest water poured from a jar, simulating drowning. The potro (rack) stretched limbs apart and was likely the most common method. Confessions were deemed "true, not forced by torture", though recanting risked further torture. Murphy claimed that under torture, people will say anything. Bernard Délicieux, a Franciscan friar tortured by the Papal Inquisition, died in prison and claimed its tactics could have branded St. Peter and St. Paul heretics. After the trial, inquisitors, a bishop's representative, and consultores (experts in theology or Canon Law) met for the consulta de fe to vote unanimously on the sentence. Discrepancies required reporting to the Suprema.

=== Sentencing ===
Trial outcomes included the following:

- Acquittal, though rare, reflected badly on the inquisitors. A not guilty verdict, if reached, occurred in private.
- Suspension allowed the defendant to go free, with the possibility of the case reopening later.
- Penance required the guilty to publicly renounce their crimes—de levi for minor offenses, de vehementi for serious ones—and face punishments such as wearing a sanbenito, mandatory church attendance, exile, flogging, fines, or serving as a galley oarsman.
- Reconciliation involved a public ceremony to rejoin the Catholic Church, alongside harsher penalties such as long jail or galley terms, property confiscation, and physical punishments such as whipping. The reconciled faced bans on professions including advocacy, pharmacy, or medicine, and restrictions on carrying weapons, wearing jewelry or gold, and riding horses. These restrictions also applied to their descendants.
- Relaxation to the secular arm, i.e., burning at the stake, targeted unrepentant or relapsed heretics. Public executions allowed repentance, with the condemned garroted before burning; otherwise, they burned alive. Secular authorities, barred from trial details, enforced sentences under threat of heresy charges.

Cases often proceeded in absentia. If the accused died before trial completion, they were burned in effigy. Inquisitorial actions persisted even decades after death; proven heretics had their corpses exhumed and burned, property seized, and heirs disinherited. Punishment frequency varied over time. García Cárcel notes the Valencia court imposed death in 40% of cases before 1530, dropping to 3% later. By the mid-16th century, courts deemed torture unnecessary, and death sentences grew rare.

=== Auto de fe ===
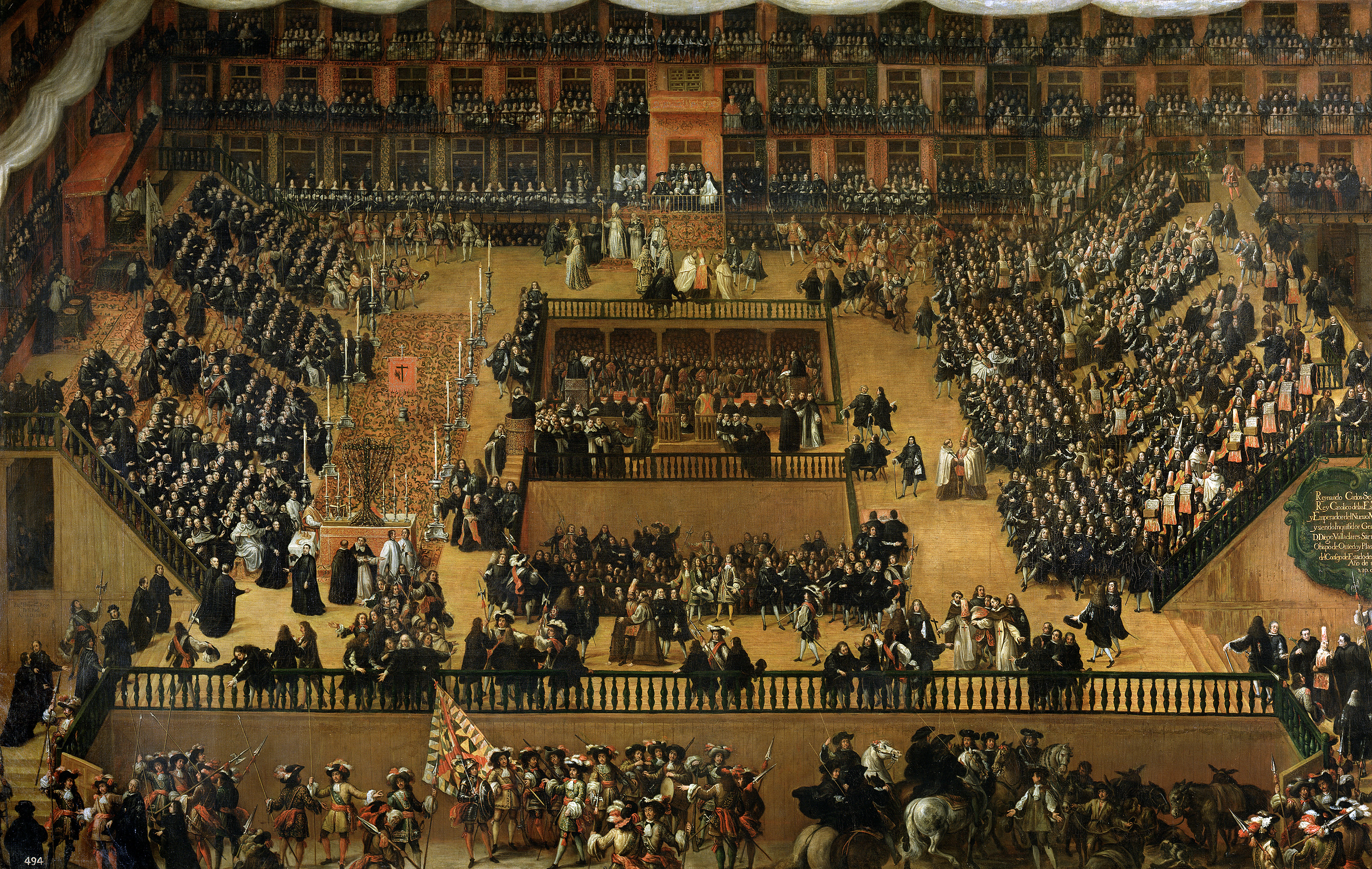
Rizi's 1683 painting of the 1680 auto de fe, Plaza Mayor in Madrid

A condemnatory sentence required the convicted to participate in an auto de fe, a ceremony formalizing their return to the Church or punishment as unrepentant heretics. These could be public (auto publico or auto general) or private (auto particular). Initially, public autos lacked grandeur or large crowds, but they evolved into elaborate, costly ceremonies showcasing Church and State power, drawing festive public audiences. The auto de fe became a baroque spectacle, staged for maximum impact in large city plazas, often on holidays. Rituals began at night with the "procession of the Green Cross" and could last the entire following day. Artists often depicted the auto de fe; a notable example is Francisco Rizi's 1683 painting, held by the Prado Museum in Madrid, showing the auto de fe in Plaza Mayor on 30 June 1680. The last public auto occurred in 1691.

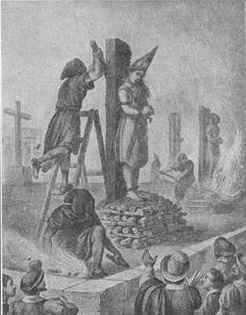
Execution of Mariana de Carabajal, a converted Jew, in Mexico City, 1601

The auto de fe included a Catholic Mass, prayers, a public procession of the convicted, and a reading of their sentences. Held in public squares, these events lasted hours with ecclesiastical and civil authorities present. Artistic depictions often show torture or burning at the stake, but these occurred separately, as the auto was a religious act. Torture followed trials, and executions happened afterward, though observers and the condemned might have perceived little distinction. The first recorded auto de fe took place in Paris in 1242 under Louis IX. In Spain, the first occurred in Seville in 1481, with six participants later burned alive.

== Transformation in the Enlightenment ==
The Enlightenment in Spain reduced inquisitorial activity. In the early 18th century, courts condemned 111 people to burning in person and 117 in effigy, mostly for judaizing. During Philip V's reign, 125 autos de fe occurred, but only 44 took place under Charles III and Charles IV.

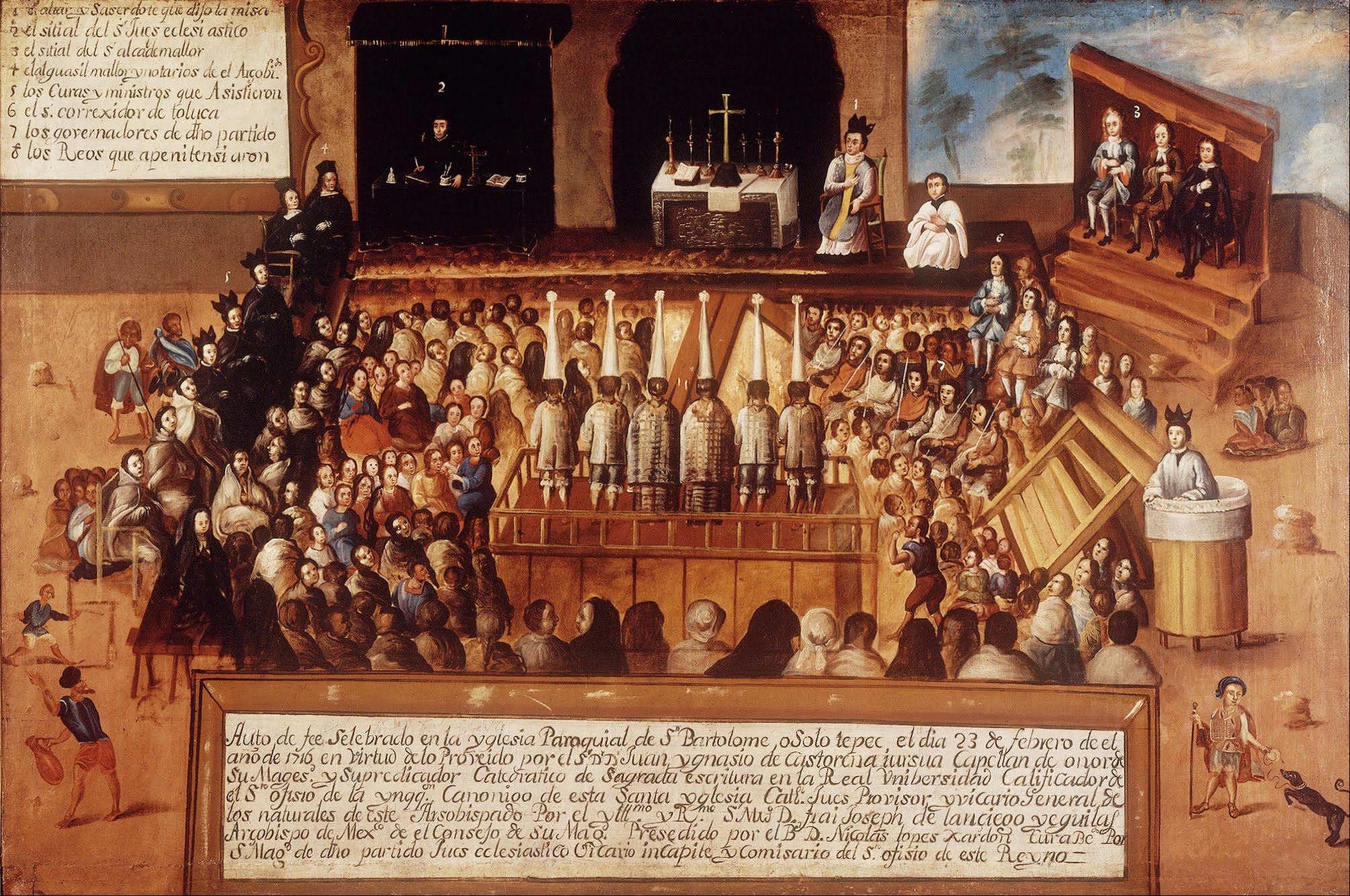
Auto-da-fé in the Viceroyalty of New Spain, 18th century

In the 18th century, Enlightenment ideas became the primary disturbance. Leading Spanish Enlightenment figures, including Olavide (1776), Iriarte (1779), and Jovellanos (1796), faced Inquisition trials. Jovellanos criticized the courts' inefficiency and their operators' ignorance, describing them as "friars who take [the position] only to gather gossip and avoid choir duties; ignorant of foreign languages, knowing only a little scholastic theology".

The Inquisition shifted to censoring publications, but struggled as Charles III secularized censorship, often favoring the Council of Castile's less rigid stance. As an arm of the state within the Council, the Inquisition lost influence. Prominent nobles and government officials, who obtained special licenses to import foreign Enlightenment texts like Diderot's Encyclopedia, further diminished its control.

Post-French Revolution, the Council of Castile, fearing revolutionary ideas, reactivated the Inquisition to target French works. A December 1789 edict, supported by Charles IV and Floridablanca, banned 39 French texts for promoting "a theoretical and practical code of independence from legitimate powers... destroying political and social order", under penalty of fines.

Opposition to the Inquisition remained clandestine. Texts praising Voltaire and Montesquieu emerged in 1759. After the Council of Castile lifted pre-publication censorship in 1785, El Censor published rationalist critiques of the Holy Office. Valentin de Foronda's Espíritu de los Mejores Diarios advocated freedom of expression, widely read in salons. Similarly, Manuel de Aguirre promoted toleration in El Censor, El Correo de los Ciegos, and El Diario de Madrid.

== End of the Inquisition ==
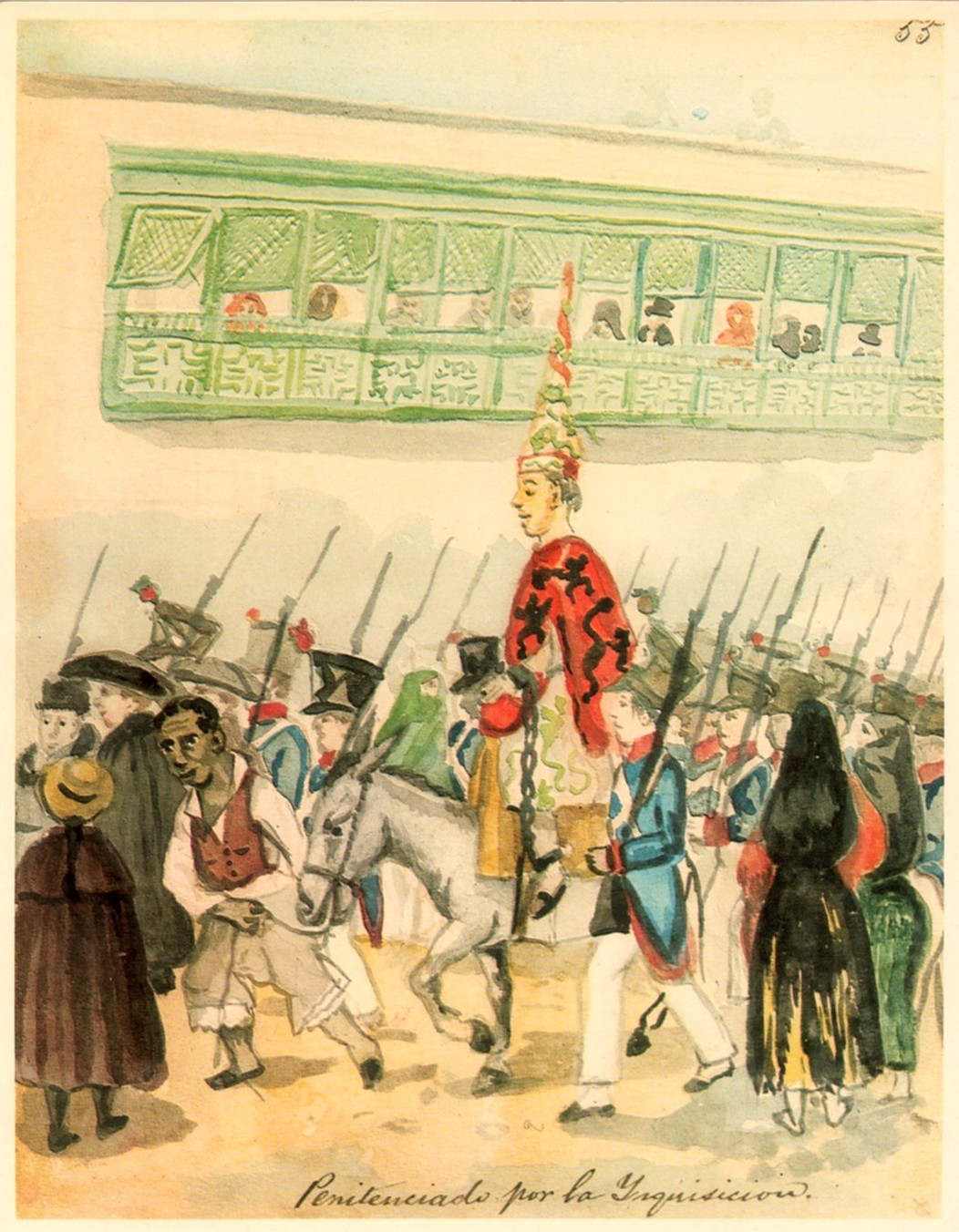
The Peruvian Inquisition, based in Lima, ended in 1820

During Charles IV's reign (1788–1808), despite fears sparked by the French Revolution, several factors hastened the Inquisition's decline. The state shifted focus from social organization to public welfare, questioning the Church's vast landholdings in regions like Castile and León, Extremadura, and Andalucía. These properties, including those of the Holy Office, were leased to farmers or communities under restrictive feudal terms, with rent often paid in cash. The throne's growing power offered Enlightenment thinkers like Manuel Godoy and Antonio Alcalá Galiano better protection for their ideas. They opposed the Inquisition, now reduced to censorship and emblematic of the Black Legend, as it clashed with contemporary political interests:

The Inquisition? Its old power no longer exists: the horrible authority that this bloodthirsty court had exerted in other times was reduced... the Holy Office had come to be a species of commission for book censorship, nothing more...

The Inquisition was abolished during Napoleon's rule under Joseph Bonaparte (1808–1812). In 1813, the liberal Cortes of Cádiz also secured its abolition, largely due to the Holy Office's condemnation of the revolt against French invasion. However, Ferdinand VII restored it on 1 July 1814. Juan Antonio Llorente, the Inquisition's general secretary in 1789, turned Bonapartist and published a critical history in 1817 from French exile, leveraging his access to its archives.

The Inquisition was abolished again during the Trienio Liberal (1820–1823), but it persisted informally during the Ominous Decade through the Congregation of the Meetings of Faith (Juntas da Fé), established in dioceses by Ferdinand VII. The last execution for heresy, of schoolteacher Cayetano Ripoll for teaching deist principles, occurred on 26 July 1826 in Valencia, sparking a Europe-wide scandal over Spain's despotic practices. On 15 July 1834, regent Maria Christina of the Two Sicilies, Ferdinand VII's liberal widow, abolished the Inquisition by Royal Decree during the minority of Isabella II, with approval from Cabinet President Francisco Martínez de la Rosa. The Alhambra Decree was rescinded on 16 December 1968 by Francisco Franco, following the Second Vatican Council's rejection of Jewish deicide.

== Outcomes ==
=== Confiscations ===
The amount of confiscated wealth remains unclear. In one year, seizures in the small town of Guadaloupe funded a royal residence. Many Spaniards claimed the Inquisition simply aimed to seize property. A Cuenca resident claimed, "They were burnt only for their money", while another said, "They burn only the well-off." In 1504, an accused person stated, "Only the rich were burnt." In 1484, Catalina de Zamora asserted, "The fathers carry out this Inquisition to take property from conversos as much as to defend the faith. The goods are the heretics." This phrase became common in Spain. In 1524, a treasurer reported to Charles V that his predecessor collected ten million ducats from conversos (unverified). In 1592, an inquisitor noted most of the fifty women he arrested were wealthy. In 1676, the Suprema claimed over 700,000 ducats for the royal treasury, after covering its own budget, which in one case was just 5% of the amount seized. Mallorca's confiscated property in 1678 exceeded 2,500,000 ducats.

=== Death tolls and sentenced ===
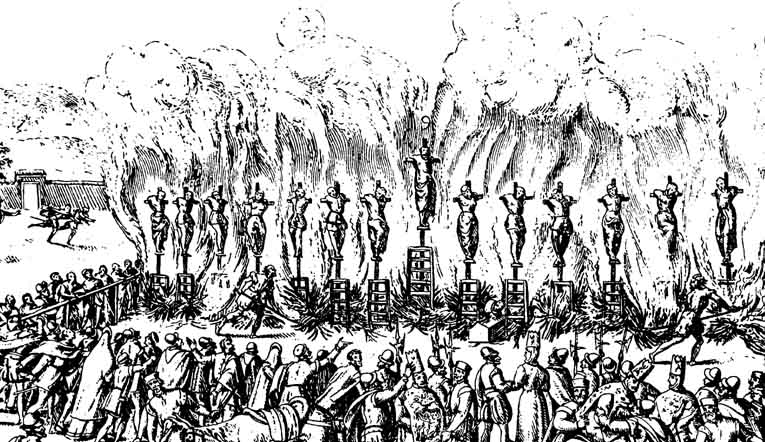
Contemporary illustration of the auto de fe in Valladolid, where fourteen Protestants were burned for their faith, 21 May 1559

Cárcel estimated a total of 150,000 prosecutions throughout the Inquisition's history. Using a 2% execution rate from 1560–1700 trials, about 3,000 were put to death. Some scholars, citing Dedieu and Cárcel's data for Toledo and Valencia, suggest 3,000–5,000 executions. Others estimate a 1–5% death rate, including religious and non-religious cases, depending on the period. This remains lower than the 40,000–60,000 executed for witchcraft in Europe during a similar period. The Suprema's archives, held in the National Historical Archive of Spain, document 44,674 judgments from 1540–1700, including 826 executions in persona and 778 in effigie. These records are incomplete, omitting tribunals like Cuenca and showing gaps for others, such as Valladolid. Additional cases, not reported to the Suprema, appear in other sources but are excluded from Contreras-Henningsen's statistics for methodological reasons. Monter estimates 1,000 executions from 1530–1630 and 250 from 1630–1730.

Pre-1560 data rely on local tribunal archives, many lost to time or events. Surviving records from Toledo (12,000 heresy-related judgments, mostly minor "blasphemy") and Valencia show the Inquisition was most active from 1480–1530, with a higher execution rate then. Modern estimates suggest about 2,000 executions in persona in Spain up to 1530.

==== Statistics for 1540–1700 ====
Henningsen and Contreras' statistics are based entirely on relaciones de causas. The number of years for which cases are documented varies for different tribunals. Data for the Aragonese Secretariat are probably complete, lacunae may concern only Valencia and possibly Sardinia and Cartagena, but the numbers for Castilian Secretariat—except Canaries and Galicia are considered as minimal due to documentation gaps. In some cases the number does not concern the whole period 1540–1700.

Tribunal	Documented by Henningsen and Contreras				Estimated totals	
Tribunal	Years documented	Number of cases	Executions		Trials	Executions in persona
Tribunal	Years documented	Number of cases	in persona	in effigie	Trials	Executions in persona
Barcelona	94	3047	37	27	~5000	53
Navarre	130	4296	85	59	~5200	90
Mallorca	96	1260	37	25	~2100	38
Sardinia	49	767	8	2	~2700	At least 8
Zaragoza	126	5967	200	19	~7600	250
Sicily	101	3188	25	25	~6400	52
Valencia	128	4540	78	75	~5700	At least 93
Cartagena (established 1610)	62	699	3	1	~1100	At least 3
Lima (established 1570)	92	1176	30	16	~2200	31
Mexico (established 1570)	52	950	17	42	~2400	47
Aragonese Secretariat (total)		25890	520	291	~40000	At least 665
Canaries	66	695	1	78	~1500	3
Córdoba	28	883	8	26	~5000	At least 27
Cuenca	0	0	0	0	5202	At least 34
Galicia (established 1560)	83	2203	19	44	~2700	17
Granada	79	4157	33	102	~8100	At least 72
Llerena	84	2851	47	89	~5200	At least 47
Murcia	66	1735	56	20	~4300	At least 190
Seville	58	1962	96	67	~6700	At least 128
Toledo (incl. Madrid)	108	3740	40	53	~5500	At least 66
Valladolid	29	558	6	8	~3000	At least 54
Castilian Secretariat (total)		18784	306	487	~47000	At least 638
Total		44674	826	778	~87000	At least 1303

==== Autos de fe between 1701 and 1746 ====
Table of sentences pronounced in the public autos de fe in Spain (excluding tribunals in Sicily, Sardinia and Latin America) between 1701 and 1746:

Tribunal	Number of autos de fe	Executions in persona	Executions in effigie	Penanced	Total
Barcelona	4	1	1	15	17
Logroño	1	1	0	0?	1?
Palma de Mallorca	3	0	0	11	11
Zaragoza	1	0	0	3	3
Valencia	4	2	0	49	51
Las Palmas	0	0	0	0	0
Córdoba	13	17	19	125	161
Cuenca	7	7	10	35	52
Santiago de Compostela	4	0	0	13	13
Granada	15	36	47	369	452
Llerena	5	1	0	45	46
Madrid	4	11	13	46	70
Murcia	6	4	1	106	111
Seville	15	16	10	220	246
Toledo	33	6	14	128	148
Valladolid	10	9	2	70	81
Total	125	111	117	1235	1463

=== Abuse of power ===
According to Toby Green, the unchecked power given to inquisitors left them "widely seen as above the law". They sometimes had motives that had nothing to do with punishing religious nonconformity. Green quotes a complaint by historian Manuel Barrios about one Inquisitor, Diego Rodriguez Lucero, who in Cordoba in 1506 burned to death the husbands of two women; he then kept the women as mistresses. According to Barrios:

...the daughter of Diego Celemin was exceptionally beautiful, her parents and her husband did not want to give her to [Lucero], and so Lucero had the three of them burnt and now has a child by her, and he has kept for a long time in the alcazar as a mistress.

Some writers disagree with Green. These authors do not necessarily deny the abuses of power, but classify them as politically instigated and comparable to those of any other law enforcement body of the period. Criticisms, usually indirect, include suspiciously sexual overtones or similarities to unrelated older antisemitic accounts of kidnap and torture, and proofs of control that the king had over the institution, to the sources used by Green, or just by reaching completely different conclusions.

=== Long-term economic effects ===
According to a 2021 study, "municipalities of Spain with a history of a stronger inquisitorial presence show lower economic performance, educational attainment, and trust today."

=== Effect on scientific inquiry ===
A 2025 study found that the Spanish Inquisition "had important chilling effects, reducing scholars' willingness to interact with others and inducing them to divert their efforts away from STEM fields (or to pursue them outside Spain)". It led to "reversals in previously upward trends in university attendance and book output in STEM fields". STEM scholars typically left Spain or reduced their scientific output in fields that might fall afoul of the inquisitors.

== Causes ==
The Spanish Inquisition emerged from a complex interplay of social, political, and religious factors. The "multi-religious hypothesis" highlights Spain’s diverse society, where Catholics, Jews, and Muslims coexisted in relative peace (convivencia), though with unequal legal status, until anti-Jewish riots in 1391 led to mass conversions. The "enforcement across borders hypothesis" suggests the Inquisition was a tool for the Catholic Monarchs to assert royal authority over fragmented noble factions, using Catholicism as a unifying force. The "placate Europe hypothesis" posits that the Inquisition and expulsions of Jews and Moriscos aimed to counter Spain’s negative image as a land of “impure blood” and align it with European Christian norms to secure alliances. The "Ottoman scare hypothesis" points to fears of Morisco collaboration with an expanding Ottoman Empire. The "Renaissance hypothesis" aligns the Inquisition with centralizing political philosophies, while the "checking the Pope hypothesis" views it as a strategic move to limit papal influence by placing the Inquisition under royal control. Economic motives and rising intolerance, mirroring broader European trends, may have also played roles, though purely religious devotion is debated given Ferdinand’s pragmatic political persona.

== Historiography ==
How historians and commentators have viewed the Spanish Inquisition has changed over time and continues to be a source of controversy. Before and during the 19th century, historical interest focused on who was being persecuted. In the early and mid-20th century, historians examined the specifics of what happened and how it influenced Spanish history. In the later 20th and 21st centuries, some historians have re-examined how severe the Inquisition truly was, calling into question some of the assumptions made in earlier periods.

== In popular culture ==
=== Literature ===
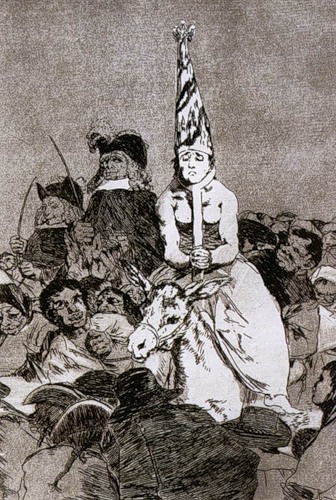
There was no remedy, from Los Caprichos, 1797–98, by Francisco de Goya.

18th-century literature critiques the Spanish Inquisition, portraying it as a symbol of intolerance and arbitrary justice. In Voltaire's Candide, it epitomizes European oppression. During the Romantic Period, the Gothic novel, primarily a Protestant genre, often linked Catholicism to terror and repression. This view appears in works such as Matthew Gregory Lewis's The Monk (1796), set in Inquisition-era Madrid, but reflecting on the French Revolution and the Terror; Charles Robert Maturin's Melmoth the Wanderer (1820); and Jan Potocki's The Manuscript Found in Saragossa.

19th-century literature emphasizes the Inquisition's use of torture. The French epistolary novel Cornelia Bororquia, or the Victim of the Inquisition, attributed to Spaniard Luiz Gutiérrez and based on María de Bohórquez, sharply condemns the Inquisition. In Fyodor Dostoevsky's The Brothers Karamazov (1880), the chapter "The Grand Inquisitor" depicts Jesus Christ appearing in Seville during the Inquisition. Arrested by an aged Cardinal Grand Inquisitor, he faces death as a heretic. The Inquisitor questions him: "Is it You? ... Don't answer, remain silent. You have no right to add to what You've said. Why have You come to disturb us? You know You have." Christ silently kisses him, and the Inquisitor releases him, saying, "Go and don't come back... never, never, never!" Edgar Allan Poe's "The Pit and the Pendulum" explores Inquisitorial torture.

20th-century works continue this theme. Marcos Aguinis's La Gesta del Marrano depicts the Inquisition's reach in 16th- and 17th-century Argentina. Les Daniels's The Black Castle (1978), part of the "Don Sebastian Vampire Chronicles", set in 15th-century Spain, describes Inquisitorial questioning, an auto de fe, and features Tomás de Torquemada. In Marvel Comics's Marvel 1602, the Inquisition targets Mutants for "blasphemy", with Magneto as the Grand Inquisitor. The second Captain Alatriste novel by Arturo Pérez-Reverte includes the narrator's torture by the Inquisition. Miguel Delibes's 1998 novel The Heretic portrays the Inquisition's repression of Valladolid's Protestants. Samuel Shellabarger's Captain from Castile directly addresses the Inquisition. Ildefonso Falcones's 2006 novel La Catedral del Mar, set in 14th-century Spain, depicts Inquisition investigations in small towns and a major scene in Barcelona.

=== Film ===
- The 1947 epic Captain from Castile by Darryl F. Zanuck, starring Tyrone Power, uses the Inquisition as the major plot point. It tells how powerful families used its evils to ruin their rivals.
- The Spanish Inquisition segment of the 1981 Mel Brooks movie History of the World Part I is a comedic musical performance based on the activities of the first Inquisitor General of Spain, Tomás de Torquemada.
- The film The Fountain (2006), by Darren Aronofsky, features the Spanish Inquisition as part of a plot in 1500 when the Grand Inquisitor threatens Queen Isabella's life.
- Goya's Ghosts (2006) by Miloš Forman is set in Spain between 1792 and 1809 and focuses realistically on the role of the Inquisition and its end under Napoleon's rule.
- The film Assassin's Creed (2016) by Justin Kurzel, starring Michael Fassbender, is set in both modern times and Spain during the Inquisition. The film follows Callum Lynch (played by Fassbender) as he is forced to relive the memories of his ancestor, Aguilar de Nerha (also played by Fassbender), an Assassin during the Spanish Inquisition.
- The many film adaptations of the Edgar Allan Poe short story "The Pit and the Pendulum", including the 1961 film and the 1991 film.
- Akelarre (Pedro Olea, 1984), a film, about the Logroño trial of the Zugarramurdi witches.
- Tomás de Torquemada is portrayed in 1492: The Conquest of Paradise (1992).

=== Theatre, music, television, and video games ===
- The Grand Inquisitor plays a part in Don Carlos (1867), a play by Friedrich Schiller (which was the basis for the opera Don Carlos in five acts by Giuseppe Verdi, in which the Inquisitor is also featured, and the third act is dedicated to an auto de fe).
- The 1965 musical Man of La Mancha depicts a fictionalized account of the author Miguel de Cervantes' run-in with Spanish authorities. The character of Cervantes produces a play-within-a-play of his unfinished manuscript, Don Quixote, while he awaits sentencing by the Inquisition.

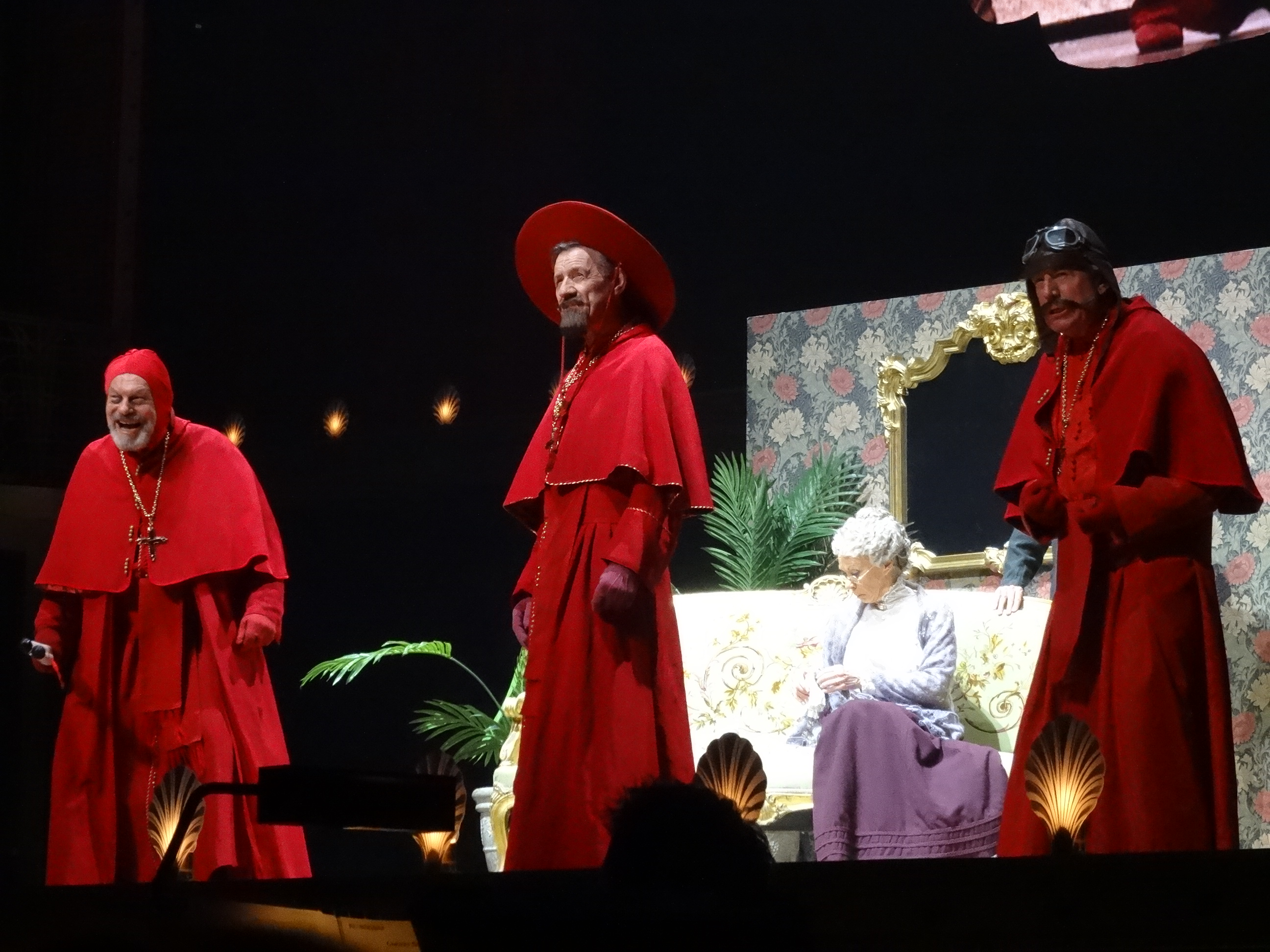
Monty Python members Terry Gilliam, Michael Palin and Terry Jones performing "The Spanish Inquisition" sketch during the 2014 Python reunion.

- In the Monty Python comedy team's Spanish Inquisition sketches, an inept group of Inquisitors repeatedly burst into scenes, after someone utters the words "I didn't expect a kind of Spanish Inquisition", screaming "Nobody expects the Spanish Inquisition!" The Inquisition then uses ineffectual forms of torture, including a dish-drying rack, soft cushions and a comfy chair.
- The Spanish Inquisition features as a main plotline element of the 2009 video game Assassin's Creed II: Discovery.

== See also ==
- Black legend
- Black Legend of the Spanish Inquisition
- Francisco Jiménez de Cisneros
- Congregation for the Doctrine of the Faith
- Eleno de Céspedes
- Goa Inquisition in Portuguese Goa
- History of the Jews in Spain
- Holy Child of La Guardia
- Inquisition in the Netherlands in the Spanish Netherlands
- Mexican Inquisition in New Spain
- Papal Inquisition in Spain
- Persecution of Christians
- Persecution of Muslims
- Peruvian Inquisition in the Viceroyalty of Peru
- Francisca Nuñez de Carabajal

== General and cited references ==
=== Seminal classical works ===
- Eymerich, Nicholas (1821). Manual de Inquisidores para uso de las inquisiciones de España y Portugal, ó Compendio de la Obra titulada Directorio de Inquisidores, de Nicolao Eymerico, Inquisidor general de Aragón (translated from French to Spanish by J. Marchena). Imprenta de Feliz Aviñon.
- Gui, Bernard, Manuel de l'Inquisiteur, (1927)
- Lea, Henry Charles (1906). A History of the Inquisition of Spain (4 volumes). The MacMillan Co.
- Lea, Henry Charles (1901). The Moriscos of Spain: Their Conversion and Expulsion. Philadelphia: Lea Brothers and Co.
- Llorente, Juan Antonio (1817). Histoire critique de l'Inquisition d'Espagne (4 volumes) (in French). Imprimerie de Plassan.
- Pastor, Ludwig von, History of the Popes from the Close of the Middle Ages; Drawn from the Secret Archives of the Vatican and other original sources, 40 vols. St. Louis, B. Herder 1898
- Pérez, Joseph (2005). The Spanish Inquisition: A History. Yale University Press.
- Pérez, Joseph (2005b). Los judíos en España [The Jews in Spain] (in Spanish). Madrid: Marcial Pons.
- Pérez, Joseph (2009). Breve Historia de la Inquisición en España (in Spanish). Crítica.
- Torquemada, Tomás de (1667). Compilacion de las Instrucciones del Oficio de la Santa Inquisicion (in Spanish). Diego Diaz de la Carrera.

=== Revisionist books ===
- Barea, María Elvira Roca (2016). Imperiofobia Y Leyenda Negra: Roma, Rusia, Estados Unidos Y El Imperio Español. Siruela.
- Boruchoff, David A. "Isabel, Her Chroniclers and the Inquisition: Self-Fashioning and Historical Memory". A Companion to the Queenship of Isabel la Católica. Leiden: Koninklijke Brill, 2023. 34-71.
- Carroll, Warren H., Isabel: the Catholic Queen, Christendom Press (1991)
- García Cárcel, Ricardo (1976). Orígenes de la Inquisición Española. El Tribunal de Valencia, 1478–1530. Barcelona.
- Graizbord, David L. Souls in Dispute: Converso Identities in Iberia and the Jewish Diaspora, 1580–1700. Philadelphia: University of Pennsylvania Press 2004.
- Homza, Lu Ann (2006). The Spanish Inquisition, 1478–1614, An Anthology of Sources. Hackett Publishing.
- Kamen, Henry (1977). La Inquisición Española: una revisión histórica (in Spanish). Grupo Planeta (GBS). pp. 192, 259. ISBN 978-84-8432-670-0.
- Kamen, Henry (1998). The Spanish Inquisition: a Historical Revision. Yale University Press. ISBN 978-0-300-07522-9.
- Kamen, Henry (2005). Inkwizycja Hiszpańska [The Spanish Inquisition] (in Polish). Warsaw: Państwowy Instytut Wydawniczy. ISBN 978-83-06-02963-5.
- Kamen, Henry (2014). The Spanish Inquisition: A Historical Revision. New Haven: Yale University Press. ISBN 978-0-300-18051-0. Kamen has published 4 editions under 3 titles: "First edition published 1965 ... as The Spanish Inquisition. Second edition published 1985 ... as Inquisition and Society in Spain. Third edition published 1998 ... as The Spanish Inquisition: A Historical Revision. Fourth edition 2014."
- Kritzler, Edward, Jewish Pirates of the Caribbean. Anchor Books 2009. ISBN 978-0-7679-1952-4
- Monter, E. William (1990). Frontiers of Heresy: The Spanish Inquisition from the Basque Lands to Sicily. Cambridge University Press. ISBN 978-0-521-52259-5.
- Nirenberg, David (2013). Anti-Judaism: The Western Tradition. New York: W. W. Norton & Co. ISBN 978-0-393-34791-3. ch. 5 "Revenge of the Savior: Jews and Power in Medieval Europe", ch. 6 "The Extinction of Spain's Jews and the Birth of Its Inquisition"
- Parker, Geoffrey (1982). "Some recent work on the Inquisition in Spain and Italy". Journal of Modern History. 54 (3): 519–532. doi:10.1086/244181. JSTOR 1906231. S2CID 143860010.
- Peters, Edward (1988). Inquisition. New York & London: Free Press Collier Macmillan. ISBN 978-0-02-924980-2.
- Rawlings, Helen, The Spanish Inquisition, Blackwell Publishing (2006)

=== Old scholarship ===
- Adler, Elkan Nathan – Autos de fe and the Jew (1908)
- Baião, António – A Inquisição em Portugal e no Brasil (1921)
- Baker, J. – History of the Inquisition (1736)
- Ballester, Vicente Vignau – Catálogo de las causas contra la fe seguidas ante el tribunal de Santo oficio de la inquisición de Toledo (,,,) (1903)
- Bell, Aubrey F.G. – Luis de Leon: A Study of the Spanish Renaissance (1925)
- Cappa, Ricardo – La Inquisicion Espanola (1888)
- Cardew, Alexander – A Short History of the Inquisition (1933)
- Castellano y de la Pena, Gaspar Un Complot Terrorista en el Siglo XV; los Comienzos de la Inquisicion Aragonesa, (1927)
- Coulton, George Gordon – The Inquisition (1929)
- Garau, Francisco – La Fee Triunfante en quatro autos celebrados en Mallorca por el Santo Oficio de la Inquisición en que han salido ochenta y ocho reos (...) – (1691– reprinted 1931)
- García, Genaro, La Inquisición de México (1906).
- García, Genaro, Autos de fe de la Inquisición de Mexico (1910)
- Herculano, Alexandre, Historia da Origem e Estabelecimento da Inquisiçao em Portugal (English translation, 1926)
- Henningsen, Gustav (1993). "The Database of the Spanish Inquisition". In Mohnhaupt, Heinz; Simon, Dieter (eds.). Vorträge zur Justizforschung , Geschichte und Theorie.
- Jouve, Marguerite – Torquemada (1935)
- Maistre, Joseph de – Letters on the Spanish Inquisition (1838)
- Maycock, Alan Lawson – The Inquisition (1926)
- Marchant, John – A Review of the Bloody Tribunal; or the horrid cruelties of the Inquisition (...) 1770)
- Marín, Julio Melgares – Procedimientos de la Inquisición (2 volumes), (1886)
- Medina, José Toribio – "Historia del Tribunal del Santo Oficio de la inquisición de Lima (1569–1820)" (1887)
- Meliá, Antonio Paz y – Catálogo Abreviado de Papeles de Inquisición (1914)
- Merveilleux, Charles Frédéric de – Memoires Instructifs pour un Voyageur dans les Divers États de l'Europe (1738)
- Montes, Raimundo González de – Discovery and Playne Declaration of Sundry Subtile Practices of the Holy Inquisition of Spayne (1568)
- Nickerson, Hoffman – The Inquisition (1923)
- Páramo, Luis de – De origine et progressu Officii Sanctae Inquisitionis, eiusque, dignitate & utilitate 1598
- Perlas, Ramon de Vilana, La verdadera práctica apostólica de el S. Tribunal de la Inquisición (1735)
- Puigblanch, Antonio – La Inquisición sin máscara ó Disertacion En Que Se Prueban Hasta La Evidencia Los Vicios De Este Tribunal Y La Necesidad De Que Se Suprima... (1816)]
- Roth, Cecil – The Spanish Inquisition (1937)
- Roth, Cecil – History of the Marranos (1932)
- Sabatini, Rafael (1930). Torquemada and the Spanish Inquisition (rev. ed.). Houghton Mifflin Company.
- Sabatini, Rafael (13 March 2018). Torquemada and the Spanish Inquisition. Endymion Press. ISBN 978-1-5312-9920-0.
- Sime, William – History of the Inquisition from its origin under Pope Innocent III till the present time. (1834)
- Teixeira, António José – Antonio Homem e a Inquisicão (1895)
- Turberville, Arthur Stanley – Medieval History and the Inquisition (1920)
- Turberville, Arthur Stanley – The Spanish Inquisition (1932).
- Walsh, William Thomas, Isabella of Spain (1930) and Characters of the Inquisition (1940). Both reprinted by TAN Books (1987).
- Wilkens, Cornelius August : Spanish Protestants in the Sixteenth Century (1897), 218p. read online at archive.org"Title Catalog". The Library of Iberian Resources.

=== Other ===
- Bergemann, Patrick (2019). Judge thy neighbor: denunciations in the Spanish Inquisition, Romanov Russia, and Nazi Germany. Columbia University Press.
- Frassetto, Michael (2007). Heretic lives: Medieval Heresy from Bogomil and the Cathars to Wyclif and Hus. Profile Books. ISBN 978-1-86197-744-1.
- Green, Toby (2007). Inquisition: the reign of fear. New York: Thomas Books. ISBN 978-0-312-53724-1.
- Haliczer, Stephen (1 January 1990). Inquisition and Society in the Kingdom of Valencia, 1478-1834. University of California Press. ISBN 978-0-520-06729-5.
- Leff, Gordon (1967). Heresy in the Late Middle Ages: The relation of Heterodoxy to dissent c. 1250 – c. 1450. Manchester University Press.
- Murphy, Cullen (2012). God's jury: the Inquisition and the making of the modern world. Boston: Houghton Mifflin Harcourt. ISBN 978-0-618-09156-0.
- Peters, Edward (1980). Heresy and Authority in Medieval Europe: Documents in translation. University of Pennsylvania Press.
- Plaidy, Jean (1994). The Spanish Inquisition:its Rise, growth, and end (Three volumes in one). New York: Barnes & Noble.
- Robertson, John M. (1902). A Short History of Christianity. London: Watts & Co.
- Rutgers, Leonard V.; Bradbury, Scott (2006). "The Diaspora, c. 235–638". In Katz, Steven T. (ed.). The Late Roman-Rabbinic Period. The Cambridge History of Judaism. Vol. 4. Cambridge University Press. ISBN 978-0-521-77248-8.
- Saraiva, António José (2001). The Marrano factory: The Portuguese Inquisition and Its New Christians 1536–1765. Leiden: Brill.
- Scott, George Ryley (1959). The history of torture throughout the ages (7th ed.). Luxor Press.
- Stavans, Ilan (2005). The Schocken Book of Modern Sephardic Literature. New York: Random House, Inc.
- Tatz, Colin Martin; Higgins, Winton (2016). The Magnitude of Genocide. ABC-CLIO. ISBN 978-1-4408-3161-4.
- Thomsett, Michael (2010). The Inquisition: A History. McFarland & Company, Inc.
- Twiss, Miranda (2002). The Most Evil Men And Women In History. Michael O'Mara Books Ltd.
- Villacañas, José Luis (2019). Imperiofilia y el populismo nacional-católico: Otra historia del imperio español. Editorial Lengua de Trapo.
- Walsh, William Thomas (1940). Characters of the Inquisition (PDF). New York: P.J. Kenedy & Sons.
- Whitechapel, Simon (2003). Flesh Inferno: Atrocities of Torquemada and the Spanish Inquisition. Creation Books.
