= Papal Inquisition in Spain =

Institution targeting heresy in Spain

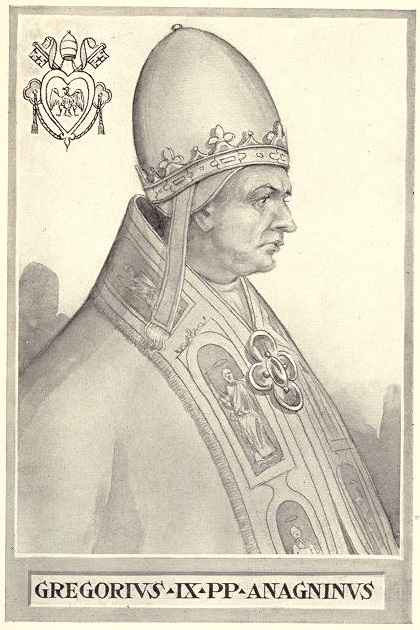
Pope Gregory the IX started this type of inquisition.

The papal Inquisition is different from the Spanish Inquisition as it refers to the state-church institution established by King Ferdinand II of Aragon and Queen Isabella I of Castile in 1480. However, inquisitorial tribunals operated on the Iberian Peninsula long before this date. Like most Catholic European countries, Spanish kingdoms were subject to the medieval papal Inquisition, with several bishops also conducting inquisitorial activities. The Inquisition's activities were largely confined to the Crown of Aragon, while in Castile and Portugal, it was virtually unknown.

== Heretics in Spain ==
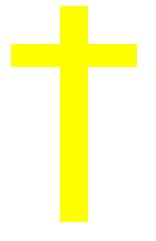
Yellow Cathar cross, a symbol imposed by the Inquisition for repentant heretics to wear

The two major medieval heretic movements, the Cathars and Waldensians, were present in Spain from the late 12th century. Waldensians were explicitly named in anti-heretical decrees by Aragonese kings Alfonso II in 1194 and Peter II in 1198. One Waldensian leader, Durand of Huesca, from Aragon, reconciled with the Catholic Church in 1208, founding the "Poor Catholics" community. Cathars, infiltrating from Languedoc, found protectors among some Catalan nobility. Their presence grew during the Albigensian Crusades (1209–1229), when King Peter II intervened against the crusaders to protect his influence in southern France but died at the Battle of Muret in 1213. The main Cathar stronghold in Aragon was the Viscounty of Castellbò in the Diocese of Urgell.

In 1194, Alfonso II issued an edict against Waldensians. In 1198, Peter II introduced the death penalty by burning at the stake for heretics, likely the first official use of this punishment for heresy in medieval European law. However, there is no evidence these decrees were enforced in the early 13th century. In 1226, 1228, and February 1234, James I issued further decrees banning heretics from entering Aragon and declaring those present as outlaws.

== Beginnings of the Aragonese Inquisition ==
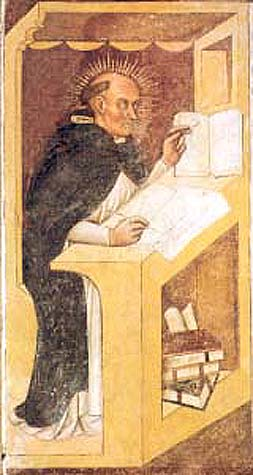
Raymond of Peñafort, key legislator of the Aragonese Inquisition

The introduction of the Inquisition to Spain is often linked to Pope Gregory IX's bull Declinante jam mundi of 26 May 1232. This bull instructed the Archbishop of Tarragona, Esparrago, and his suffragans to initiate heresy trials in their dioceses, with assistance from Dominicans, reinforcing existing episcopal duties rather than creating a new institution. In 1235, Gregory IX sent Aragonese bishops procedural instructions drafted by the Spanish canonist and Dominican Raymond of Peñafort. In 1237, Tarragona's archbishop-elect Guillem Montgriu, with Bishops Bernard of Vic and Peter of Lleida, conducted an investigation in Castellbò, resulting in 45 imprisonments, 15 condemnations in absentia, the exhumation and burning of 18 bodies, and the destruction of two heretic meeting houses.

In April 1238, Gregory IX assigned heresy investigations in Aragon and Navarre to Dominicans and Franciscans, marking the formal establishment of the papal Inquisition in Spain. A synod in Tarragona in 1242 refined the tribunal's procedures. The Inquisition faced resistance: in 1242, inquisitor Ponce de Blanes was poisoned during a follow-up investigation in Castellbò, and in 1260, heretics killed inquisitor Bernard Travesser. King James I strongly supported the Inquisition. Papal bulls from Pope Innocent IV in 1248 and 1254 restricted inquisitorial roles in Aragon to Dominicans, excluding Franciscans. The formation of permanent inquisitorial structures concluded with Pope Urban IV's 1262 decision, granting the Dominican provincial of Spain the authority to appoint and dismiss up to two inquisitors in Aragon.

In the 1250s and 1260s, Dominican inquisitors successfully targeted Cathars, primarily in the Diocese of Urgell. These investigations confirmed past support for heretics by local feudal lords. Posthumous condemnations included Count Ramon of Urgell (11 January 1258), Lord Ponc de Vernet of Conflent (1260), Viscount Pierre of Fenouillet (1262), and Viscount Arnold of Castellbò and his daughter Ermessenda (1269), with their remains exhumed. Cathars remained defiant; in 1277, inquisitor Pere de Cadireta was stoned to death in Urgell, though the circumstances are unclear. By the late 13th century, the Inquisition likely eradicated Cathar influence in Aragon, as no significant activity is recorded after 1277, though documents from 1284 and 1298 confirm ongoing inquisitorial appointments.

== Aragonese Inquisition in the 14th–15th century ==
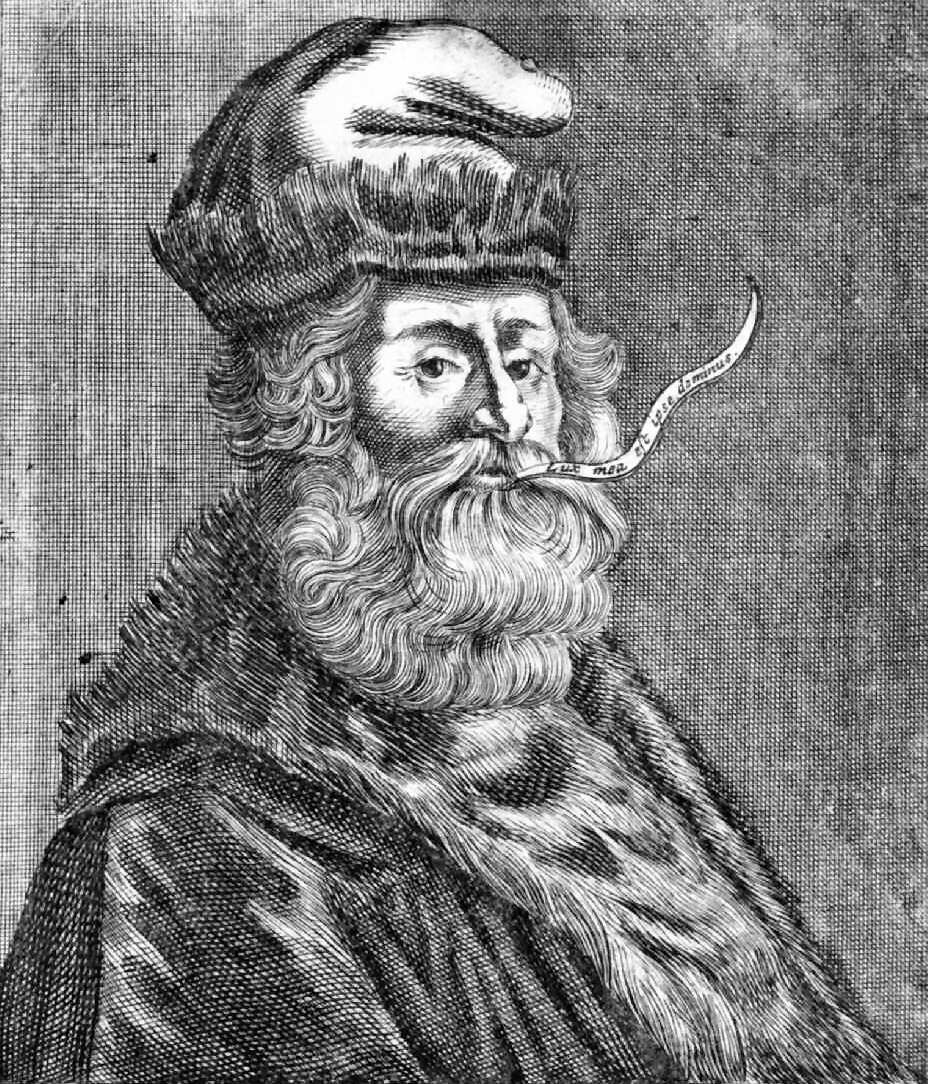
Blessed Ramon Llull, whose works inquisitor Nicolas Eymerich accused of heresy

In 1301, the Spanish Dominican province split into Spain (Castile-León and Portugal) and Aragon (Aragon, Navarre, and Majorca). The 1262 bull of Pope Urban IV remained unchanged, leaving inquisitor appointments in Aragon to the Spanish provincial, causing a prolonged conflict. In 1351, Pope Clement VI granted the Aragonese provincial the right to appoint inquisitors.

In 1308, Aragonese inquisitor Juan de Lotgerio participated in interrogations of Templars. In 1317, he condemned the works of Arnold de Vilanova. His successors, Bernard Puigcercos (c. 1320–1346), Arnold Burguete (1325), and Guillem Costa (1328–1346), primarily prosecuted Franciscan spirituals and Jewish converts accused of reverting to Judaism. In 1302, Juan de Lotgerio acquitted Jews in Jaca accused of blasphemy and church desecration in Alexandria. In 1325, Bernard Puigcercos fined the Jewish community in Calatayud for encouraging a Christian convert to revert to Judaism. In 1352 and 1371, Jews faced inquisitorial trials for alleged magic.

Nicolas Rossell, inquisitor and Aragonese provincial (1351–1356), secured the Inquisition's independence from the Spanish provincial in 1351. On 23 December 1356, Pope Innocent VI appointed him a cardinal. His successor, Nicholas Eymerich (d. 1399), the most prominent Aragonese inquisitor, authored Directorium Inquisitorum (c. 1376, printed 1503 in Barcelona, 1578 in Rome, 1595 in Venice). Eymerich opposed the royal court's support for Ramon Llull's teachings, accusing them of heresy, leading to conflicts with Kings Peter IV and John I. Internal Dominican rivalries with Bernard Ermengaudi over provincial and inquisitorial roles further complicated matters. Eymerich was briefly removed as inquisitor in 1360 and 1385 and exiled to the papal court in Avignon (1376–1383, 1393–1397).

The number of inquisitors in Aragon gradually increased, leading to smaller inquisitorial districts. In 1313, Pope Clement V established a separate tribunal for the Kingdom of Majorca, covering the Balearic Islands, Roussillon, and Cerdanya, based in Perpignan. Its reintegration into Aragon in the mid-14th century did not dissolve this tribunal. In 1413, Antipope Benedict XIII created a separate tribunal for the Balearics in Palma de Mallorca. Majorcan inquisitor nominations were reserved for the Dominican general, bypassing the provincial, though a 1420 bull by Pope Martin V indicated Aragonese provincial involvement. After the Western Schism, Martin V's 1420 bull confirmed the division of Majorca into Balearics and Pyrenean counties and separated Valencia from Aragon. In 1447, a Catalan tribunal was established, and in 1459, Barcelona was further separated. By 1475, Aragon had six inquisitorial districts:

- Aragon (general inquisitor)
- Valencia
- Catalonia
- Barcelona
- Majorca
- Roussillon

In 1475, the Dominican general appointed Juan Franco as Navarre's inquisitor, though no prior active inquisitors are recorded there beyond 1238. The increase in inquisitors reflected the office becoming an honorary distinction rather than heightened activity.

In 1435, Majorcan inquisitor Antonio Murta played a key role in forced conversions of Jews. In 1481, King Ferdinand II of Aragon sought to control Aragonese papal inquisitors during a campaign against judaizers in Castile. He appointed his candidates, but their actions sparked protests. On 17 October 1483, Pope Sixtus IV appointed Dominican Tomás de Torquemada as Aragon's General Inquisitor, already Castile's inquisitorial head. Papal inquisitors were gradually replaced by royal nominees, integrating the Aragonese Inquisition into the new, monarchy-controlled Spanish Inquisition. The Majorcan papal tribunal persisted until 1488.

== Castile ==
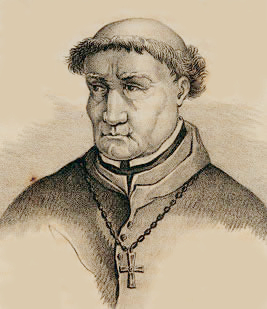
Tomás de Torquemada

The papal Inquisition was almost nonexistent in Castile-León. From the 13th to 15th centuries, sources rarely mention heretics, with trials handled by episcopal courts, not papal inquisitors. Bishop Roderic of León (1209–1232) expelled Cathars from France. In 1236, King Ferdinand III of Castile arrested heretics in Palencia, branding them with hot iron, though the local bishop reconciled them with the church. King Alfonso X's 1255 statutes mandated death for unrepentant heretics, but no executions are recorded in Castile for the next two centuries. In 1317, the Archbishop of Compostela, Roderic, captured six Apostolic Brethren fleeing southern France's Inquisition, consulting Toulouse inquisitor Bernard Gui for guidance.

In 1402, Pope Boniface IX authorized the Spanish Dominican provincial to appoint inquisitors in Castile-León and Portugal. Castile's allegiance to Antipope Benedict XIII rendered this ineffective. After the Western Schism, Portugal was excluded from the Spanish provincial's jurisdiction in 1418. Although Pope Sixtus IV reaffirmed the Spanish provincial's inquisitorial powers in January 1482, no evidence suggests their use. In the 1460s and 1470s, episcopal courts occasionally tried judaizers. In 1465, Fernando Gonzalez faced penance from Toledo's archbishop for crypto-Judaism. In 1467, Llerena's episcopal vicar sentenced two judaizers to death by burning and two to penance. Due to widespread accusations against marranos, episcopal courts proved inadequate. In 1480, with Pope Sixtus IV's approval (1478), Ferdinand II and Isabella I established a new, monarchy-controlled Spanish Inquisition.

== Portugal ==
In late 14th and early 15th century Portugal, several titular inquisitors were linked to the royal court. In 1376, Franciscan Martino Vasquez was appointed, followed by Franciscan Rodrigo Cintra in 1394, confessor to King John I of Portugal. From 1399 to 1401, Dominican provincial Vicente de Lisboa served as inquisitor under Pope Boniface IX. In 1413, Franciscan Affonso de Alprao, another royal confessor, was appointed. No records confirm active inquisitorial work by these figures. In the early 16th century, suspicions of crypto-Judaism among Jewish converts led to the 1536 establishment of the Portuguese Inquisition, modeled on the Spanish Inquisition. In 1531, English Reformation supporter William Roy was burned in Portugal.

== Statistics of trials and executions ==
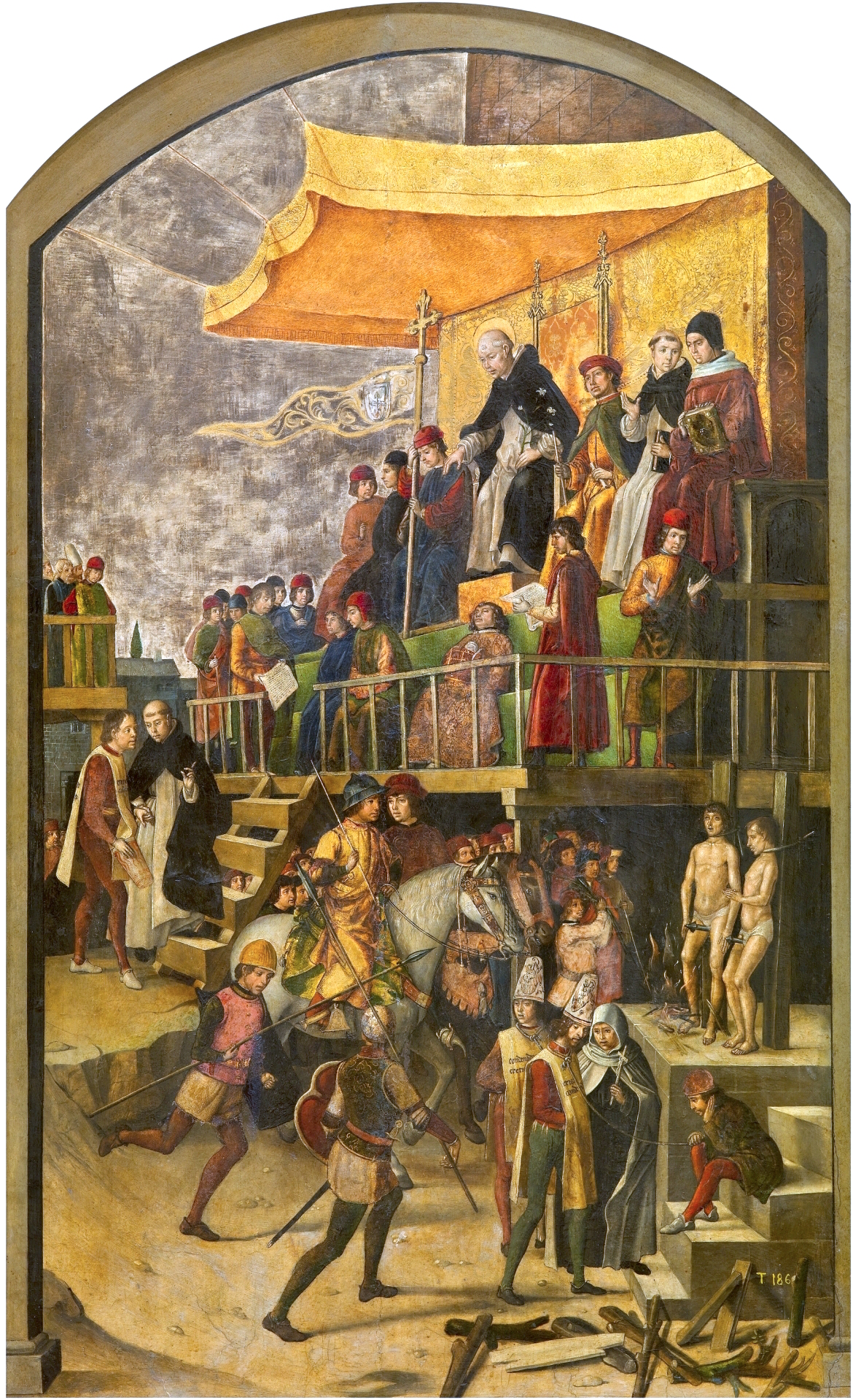
Saint Dominic Presiding over an Auto-da-fé by Pedro Berruguete, 1475

Quantifying the victims of the papal Inquisition in medieval Spain is challenging due to scarce records. A 1250s investigation in the Diocese of Urgell by inquisitors Peter Tenes and Ferrer likely led to 181 imprisonments. The first recorded executions occurred in 1258, when Peter Tenes burned two heretics in Perpignan. In 1262, royal documents note seven executions, with King James I of Aragon redistributing the heretics' confiscated properties. Between 1258 and 1269, five Catalan feudal lords were posthumously condemned.

In 1320, two Franciscan spirituals were burned in Girona. Around the same time, inquisitor Bernard Puigcercos burned Franciscan spiritual Pedro Olera and an unnamed companion in Barcelona. Another spiritual, Bonanat, received a commuted prison sentence but was later burned in 1335 by inquisitor Guillem Costa as a recidivist. In 1325, Arnold Burguete burned spiritual Duran Baldach and his disciple. Between 1341 and 1342, two Jewish converts were burned for reverting to Judaism, with others imprisoned. A 1345–1346 trial of spirituals in Vilafranca del Penedès resulted in no executions, though one defendant died during the trial, and his property was confiscated posthumously.

Inquisitor Nicolas Rossell (1351–1356) prosecuted Valencian spirituals, sentencing Jaime Justi to life imprisonment and exhuming and burning three deceased individuals' remains. In 1352, Rossell fined a Jewish physician for alleged magic. Nicholas Eymerich (1357–1399) executed at least one heretic (Nicholas of Calabria, c. 1357) and sentenced three others to life imprisonment (Bartolo Janevisio c. 1369, Jewish magician Astrucchio de Piera c. 1371, and priest Pedro de Ceplanes of Valencia c. 1390). His investigation into Ramon Llull's followers in Valencia in the early 1390s was halted by King John I of Aragon.

In 1434, inquisitor Berenguer Roig investigated alleged Hussites in Roussillon and Cerdanya, with unknown outcomes. In 1407, Jewish convert Juan de Galiana was burned in Majorca. In 1435, inquisitor Antonio Murta sentenced four Jews for alleged ritual murder in Majorca.

In the late 15th century, Aragonese inquisitors intensified efforts against marranos. Valencian inquisitors (1455–1482) held 29 trials, with one execution. Saragossa's inquisitors (c. 1475–1483) reconciled five individuals. Majorcan inquisitors (1478–1487) reconciled 16. In 1485, Barcelona's inquisitor Juan Conde posthumously condemned one marrano. This totals one execution across 51 trials from 1455 to 1487.

These figures (hundreds of trials, 25 executions) likely underrepresent the papal Inquisition's activity. Juan Antonio Llorente and Henry Charles Lea cite additional trials and executions (e.g., 1302 by inquisitor Bernard, 1304 by Domingo Peregrino, c. 1413 by Bernard Pages and Guillem Sagarra, 1430s in Valencia, 1441 by Miguel Ferriz and Martin Trilles), based on 17th-century Dominican historians like Vincenzo Maria Fontana. These accounts, often relying on Francisco Diago's Historia de la Provincia de Aragon de la Orden de Predicadores, lack contemporary corroboration, contain chronological errors, and mention unrecorded heresies, leading modern historians to question their reliability.

== Bibliography ==
- Lea, Henry Charles (1887). A History of the Inquisition of the Middle Ages. Vol. I–III. London; New York: MacMillan Co.
- Lea, Henry Charles (1906). A History of the Inquisition of Spain. Vol. 1–4. London; New York: MacMillan Co.
- Llorente, Juan Antonio (1826). The History of the Inquisition of Spain. London: William Binns.
- Smith, Damian (2010). Crusade, Heresy and Inquisition in the Lands of the Crown of Aragon (c. 1167–1276). Leiden; Boston: BRILL. ISBN 978-90-04-18289-9.
