= List of AFC Ajax players =

Amsterdamsche Football Club Ajax (Dutch pronunciation: [ˈaːjɑks]), also referred to as AFC Ajax, Ajax Amsterdam or simply Ajax (after the legendary Greek hero), is a professional football club from Amsterdam, Netherlands.

Ajax is historically one of the most successful clubs in the world; according to the IFFHS, Ajax were the seventh most successful European club of the 20th century. The club is one of the five teams that has earned the right to keep the European Cup and to wear a multiple-winner badge; they won consecutively in 1971–1973. In 1972, they completed the European treble by winning the Dutch Eredivisie, KNVB Cup, and the European Cup; to date, they are the only team to keep the European Cup and accomplish the European treble. Ajax's last international trophies were the 1995 Intercontinental Cup and the 1995 Champions League, where they defeated Milan in the final; they lost the 1996 Champions League final on penalties to Juventus.

They are also one of three teams to win the treble and the Intercontinental Cup in the same season/calendar year; This was achieved in the 1971–72 season. Ajax, Juventus, Bayern Munich, Chelsea and Manchester United are the five clubs to have won all three major UEFA club competitions. They have also won the Intercontinental Cup twice, the 1991–92 UEFA Cup, as well as the Karl Rappan Cup, a predecessor of the UEFA Intertoto Cup in 1962.

This list includes past and present footballers who have played for Ajax.

== List of players ==
Players listed below with dual citizenship, are listed with their country of birth first, followed by their second citizenship, unless a player has represented one of their nations on an International level, in which case the team which they have played for is listed first, and their other nationality is listed second.

In some instances, three flags may be listed to represent a player's nationality. This is the case when a player is born in a country to parents of both different nationalities, which also differ from the country of their child's birthplace, however, the player represents his country of birth Internationally. An example of this would be Patrick Kluivert, who is Dutch and plays for the Netherlands national team, while his father is from Suriname, and his mother is from Curaçao. In these cases the paternal citizenship is listed second to the players' primary nationality, followed by the nation of the player's mother thirdly.

Players who were born in a foreign country, but do not hold citizenship of that nation, do not have the country of their birthplace listed below as their nationality, while some players have become naturalised citizens of a country, in which case it is listed as well.

Players with no league caps or goals may have made appearances in other competitions, as only league appearances and goals are being tallied in the list below.

Spent their entire professional career with AFC Ajax.
Currently playing for AFC Ajax, league caps and goals are subject to change.
Part of the AFC Ajax Club van 100, having amassed more than 100 caps across all competitions.

Name	Nationality	Position	AFC Ajax career	Captaincy	League apps	League goals	Notes
Mohamed Abdalla	Netherlands / Sudan	Midfielder	2026–present	—	—	—	
Noah Abid	Tunisia / Netherlands	Midfielder	2018–2019	—	—	—	
Stanley Aborah	Belgium / Ghana	Midfielder	2004–2006	—	4	0	^{[1]}
Elton Acolatse	Netherlands / Ghana	Forward	2013–2016	—	—	—	
Wim Addicks	Netherlands	Forward	1922–1931	—	28	15	
Simon Adingra	Ivory Coast	Forward	2026–present	—	—	—	^{[2]}
Olivier Aertssen	Netherlands	Midfielder	2021–2024	—	—	—	
Oualid Agougil	Netherlands / Morocco	Defender	2023–2024	—	—	—	
Ismaïl Aissati	Morocco / Netherlands	Midfielder	2008–2012	—	36	6	^{[2]}
Jamal Akachar	Netherlands / Morocco	Forward	2002–2007	—	2	0	^{[3]}
Chuba Akpom	England / Nigeria	Forward	2023–2026	—	42	14	
Robert Alberts	Netherlands	Midfielder	1975–1977	—	—	—	^{[4]}
Gerald Alders	Netherlands / Namibia	Defender	2025–present	—	3	0	
Toby Alderweireld	Belgium	Defender	2008–2013	—	128	7	
Rob Alflen	Netherlands	Midfielder	1991–1995	—	26	5	
Edson Álvarez	Mexico	Defender	2019–2023	—	98	10	
Sofyan Amrabat	Morocco / Netherlands	Midfielder	2026–present	—	—	—	
Yannis Anastasiou	Greece	Forward	2004–2006	—	32	7	
Wim Anderiesen	Netherlands	Midfielder	1925–1940	—	309	20	
Wim Anderiesen Jr.	Netherlands	Defender	1951–1961	—	177	1	
Lucas Andersen	Denmark	Midfielder	2012–2016	—	37	2	^{[5]}
Djavan Anderson	Netherlands / Suriname / Jamaica	Midfielder	2013–2014	—	—	—	
Vurnon Anita	Curaçao / Netherlands	Midfielder	2005–2012	—	109	5	
Antony	Brazil	Forward	2020–2022	—	57	18	
Frank Arnesen	Denmark	Midfielder	1975–1981	1980–1981	209	75	
Tolu Arokodare	Nigeria	Forward	2026–present	—	—	—	^{[6]}
Shota Arveladze	Georgia	Forward	1997–2001	—	96	55	
Timothée Atouba	Cameroon	Defender	2009–2011	—	1	0	
Gastón Ávila	Argentina	Defender	2023–present	—	5	0	^{[5]}
Amourricho van Axel Dongen	Netherlands / Suriname	Midfielder	2021–present	—	4	0	
Zakaria El Azzouzi	Morocco / Netherlands	Forward	2015–2018	—	—	—	^{[6]}
Youri Baas	Netherlands	Defender	2022–present	—	60	5	^{[6]}
Tijani Babangida	Nigeria	Forward	1996–2003	—	77	20	^{[7]}
Ryan Babel	Netherlands / Suriname	Forward	2004–2007; 2012–2013; 2020	—	94	18	^{[8]}
Navajo Bakboord	Suriname / Netherlands	Defender	2017–2019	—	—	—	
Kennedy Bakırcıoğlu	Sweden	Midfielder	2007–2010	—	35	6	
Danny Bakker	Netherlands	Midfielder	2014–2016	—	—	—	
Klaas Bakker	Netherlands	Midfielder	1951–1957	—	169	37	
Mitchel Bakker	Netherlands	Defender	2017–2019	—	—	—	
Gert Bals	Netherlands	Goalkeeper	1965–1970	1968–1970	168	0	
Hassane Bandé	Burkina Faso	Forward	2018–2022	—	—	—	^{[9]}
Jaydon Banel	Netherlands / Suriname	Forward	2021–2025	—	6	0	
Calvin Bassey	Nigeria / England / Italy	Defender	2022–2023	—	25	1	
Marco van Basten	Netherlands	Forward	1982–1987	—	133	128	^{[M]}
Markus Bay	Denmark	Midfielder	2016–2017	—	—	—	
Riechedly Bazoer	Netherlands / Curaçao	Defender	2013–2017	—	51	6	
Kiran Bechan	Netherlands / Suriname	Midfielder	2000–2004	—	1	0	^{[10]}
Sheraldo Becker	Suriname / Netherlands	Forward	2014–2016	—	—	—	^{[11]}
Donny van de Beek	Netherlands	Midfielder	2014–2020	—	118	28	
Milan Berck Beelenkamp	Netherlands	Midfielder	1996–1997	—	2	0	
Dick Been	Netherlands	Defender	1937–1938	—	57	0	
André Bergdølmo	Norway	Defender	2000–2003	—	69	6	
Dave van den Bergh	Netherlands	Forward	1995–1997	—	12	1	
Steven Berghuis	Netherlands	Midfielder	2021–present	—	127	28	
Dennis Bergkamp	Netherlands	Forward	1986–1993	—	185	103	^{[M]}
Steven Bergwijn	Netherlands / Suriname	Forward	2022–2024	—	57	24	
Yves Bissouma	Mali / Ivory Coast	Midfielder	2026–present	—	—	—	
Marco Bizot	Netherlands	Goalkeeper	2011–2012	—	—	—	^{[12]}
Horst Blankenburg	Germany	Defender	1970–1975	—	188	5	
Wim Bleijenberg	Netherlands	Forward	1956–1960	—	79	46	
Daley Blind	Netherlands	Defender	2008–2014; 2018–2022; 2026–present	—	226	10	^{[13]}
Danny Blind	Netherlands	Defender	1986–1999	1994–1999	372	27	^{[M]}
Henk Blomvliet	Netherlands	Defender	1932–1947	—	195	42	
Emmanuel Boakye	Ghana / Netherlands	Defender	2005–2007	—	6	0	^{[14]}
Kevin Bobson	Netherlands / Suriname	Forward	1998–2001	—	8	0	
Ilan Boccara	Netherlands / France / Israel	Midfielder	2012–2015	—	1	0	^{[15]}
Darko Bodul	Austria / Croatia	Forward	2009–2010	—	1	0	^{[16]}
Diederik Boer	Netherlands	Goalkeeper	2014–2017	—	2	0	
Frank de Boer	Netherlands	Defender	1988–1998	—	328	30	^{[M]}
Jan de Boer	Netherlands	Goalkeeper	1920–1933	—	195	0	
Ronald de Boer	Netherlands	Midfielder	1987–1991; 1993–1998	—	224	50	
Derk Boerrigter	Netherlands	Forward	2006–2007; 2011–2013	—	47	12	^{[17]}
Peter Boeve	Netherlands	Defender	1979–1988	—	228	14	
Winston Bogarde	Netherlands / Suriname	Defender	1994–1997	—	62	6	
Chahine van Bohemen	Morocco / Netherlands / Suriname	Defender	2021–2022	—	—	—	
Nicolai Boilesen	Denmark	Defender	2011–2016	—	52	1	
Wim de Bois	Netherlands	Forward	1919–1931	—	33	6	
Roly Bonevacia	Curaçao / Netherlands	Midfielder	2010–2013	—	1	0	^{[18]}
Karel Bonsink	Netherlands	Forward	1979–1980	—	26	7	
Branco van den Boomen	Netherlands	Midfielder	2013–2014; 2023–present	—	33	2	^{[18]}
Sander Boschker	Netherlands	Goalkeeper	2003–2004	—	—	—	
Hans Boskamp	Netherlands	Defender	1949–1954	—	?	?	
John Bosman	Netherlands	Forward	1983–1988	—	126	77	
Sven Botman	Netherlands	Defender	2018–2020	—	—	—	^{[19]}
Nourdin Boukhari	Morocco / Netherlands	Forward	2002–2006	—	69	14	^{[20]}
Rayane Bounida	Morocco / Belgium	Midfielder	2024–present	—	23	1	
Dries Boussatta	Netherlands / Morocco	Forward	1992–1994	—	—	—	
Aaron Bouwman	Netherlands / England / Jamaica	Defender	2025–present	—	8	1	
Julian Brandes	Netherlands	Midfielder	2022–2025	—	—	—	
Julian Brandt	Germany	Midfielder	2026–present	—	—	—	^{[20]}
Brian Brobbey	Netherlands / Ghana	Forward	2018–2021; 2022–2025	—	104	38	^{[21]}
Willy Brokamp	Netherlands	Forward	1974–1976	—	48	20	
Božo Broketa	Croatia	Defender	1958–1959	—	4	0	
Theo Brokmann	Netherlands	Forward	1912–1925	—	175	78	
Theo Brokmann, Jr.	Netherlands	Forward	1939–1951	—	126	79	
John van den Brom	Netherlands	Midfielder	1993–1995	—	44	7	
Dmitri Bulykin	Russia	Forward	2011–2012	—	19	9	
Piet Burgers	Netherlands	Forward	1954–1956	—	27	26	
Dick van Burik	Netherlands	Defender	1992–1993	—	3	0	
Ethan Butera	Belgium	Defender	2023–present	—	—	—	
Ronnie Calderon	Israel	Midfielder	1970–1971	—	—	—	
Maher Carrizo	Argentina	Forward	2026–present	—	3	0	^{[20]}
Mateo Cassierra	Colombia	Forward	2016–2019	—	21	3	^{[21]}
Geoffrey Castillion	Netherlands / Suriname	Forward	2010–2014	—	1	0	^{[22]}
Juan Castillo	Dominican Republic / Netherlands	Defender	2019–2020	—	—	—	^{[23]}
Václav Černý	Czech Republic	Midfielder	2015–2019	—	16	1	
Rida Chahid	Morocco / Netherlands	Midfielder	2023–2025	—	—	—	
Angelos Charisteas	Greece	Forward	2005–2006	—	31	12	
Cristian Chivu	Romania	Defender	1999–2003	2002–2003	107	13	
Nassef Chourak	Netherlands / Morocco	Midfielder	2023–2026	—	—	—	
Jasper Cillessen	Netherlands	Goalkeeper	2011–2016	—	143	0	
Daylon Claasen	South Africa	Midfielder	2008–2010	—	—	—	
Ray Clarke	England	Forward	1978–1979	—	31	26	
Pelle Clement	Netherlands	Midfielder	2016–2017	—	1	0	
Tim de Cler	Netherlands	Defender	1997–2002	—	75	2	
Jürgen Colin	Netherlands / Suriname	Defender	2007–2008	—	12	0	
Francisco Conceição	Portugal	Midfielder	2022–2024	—	19	0	^{[25]}
Frans Couton	Netherlands	Defender	1916–1928	—	175	0	
Johan Cruyff	Netherlands	Midfielder	1964–1973; 1981–1983	—	276	204	^{[M]}
Daniel Cruz	Colombia / Belgium	Midfielder	2000–2003	—	13	2	^{[24]}
Isaac Cuenca	Spain	Forward	2013	—	3	0	^{[25]}
Jason Culina	Australia / Croatia	Defender	2000–2004	—	3	0	^{[26]}
Darío Cvitanich	Argentina / Croatia	Forward	2008–2012	—	30	13	^{[27]}
Han Dade	Netherlands	Midfielder	1900–1914	—	?	?	
Johan Dade	Netherlands	Midfielder	1900–1908	—	?	?	
Eskild Dall	Denmark	Forward	2021–2022	—	—	—	^{[28]}
Jelle van Damme	Belgium	Defender	2002–2004	—	18	0	
Damil Dankerlui	Suriname / Netherlands	Defender	2013–2018	—	—	—	
Dani	Portugal	Forward	1996–2000	—	72	12	
Inge Danielsson	Sweden	Midfielder	1968–1969	—	27	21	
Danilo	Belgium / Brazil	Midfielder	2009–2010	—	—	—	
Danilo	Brazil	Forward	2018–2022	—	14	2	^{[28]}
Mohamed Daramy	Denmark / Sierra Leone	Forward	2021–2023	—	12	1	^{[29]}
Edgar Davids	Netherlands / Suriname	Midfielder	1992–1996; 2007–2008	2007–2008	131	21	
Erik De Haan	Netherlands	Goalkeeper	1985–1988	—	—	—	^{[30]}
Tom De Mul	Belgium	Forward	2003–2007	—	36	5	^{[29]}
Jordy Deckers	Netherlands	Goalkeeper	2010–2011	—	—	—	
Patrickson Delgado	Ecuador	Forward	2022–2023	—	—	—	^{[30]}
Laurent Delorge	Belgium	Defender	2007–2009	—	5	1	
Andriy Demchenko	Russia / Ukraine	Midfielder	1995–1996; 1997	—	6	0	^{[31]}
Stefano Denswil	Suriname / Netherlands	Defender	2012–2015	—	22	1	
Sergiño Dest	United States / Suriname / Netherlands	Defender	2018–2020	—	23	0	
Piet van Deyck	Netherlands	Midfielder	1927–1937	—	112	18	
Ally Dick	Scotland	Midfielder	1986–1988	—	11	1	
Joey Didulica	Croatia / Australia	Goalkeeper	1999–2003	—	16	0	^{[32]}
Jan van Diepenbeek	Netherlands	Defender	1929–1938	—	207	8	
Dick van Dijk	Netherlands	Forward	1969–1972	—	84	56	
Gé van Dijk	Netherlands	Forward	1943–1957	—	317	80	
Mitchell Dijks	Netherlands	Defender	2012–2014; 2015–2018	—	56	0	^{[31]}
Danilho Doekhi	Netherlands / Suriname	Defender	2016–2018	—	—	—	
Lloyd Doesburg	Suriname / Netherlands	Goalkeeper	1987–1989	—	5	0	
Kasper Dolberg	Denmark	Forward	2016–2019; 2025–present	—	100	36	
Mitchell Donald	Suriname / Netherlands	Midfielder	2007–2011	—	8	1	^{[32]}
Pim van Dord	Netherlands	Defender	1973–1980	—	137	0	
Jan van Dort	Netherlands	Midfielder	1915–1922	—	119	66	
Damjan Dostanić	Serbia / Netherlands	Forward	2018–2020	—	—	—	
Darl Douglas	Suriname / Netherlands	Midfielder	1999–2003	—	—	—	^{[33]}
Terrence Douglas	Netherlands / Suriname	Defender	2019–2022	—	—	—	^{[34]}
Guus Dräger	Netherlands	Midfielder	1941–1951	—	207	80	
Lerin Duarte	Netherlands / Cape Verde	Midfielder	2013–2016	—	18	3	^{[35]}
Marco van Duin	Netherlands	Goalkeeper	2007–2008	—	—	—	
Theo van Duivenbode	Netherlands	Defender	1964–1969	—	135	6	
Johnny Dusbaba	Netherlands	Defender	1974–1977	—	93	2	
Lorenzo Ebecilio	Netherlands / Suriname	Forward	2010–2013	—	38	9	
Zé Eduardo	Brazil	Midfielder	2009–2010	—	—	—	^{[35]}
Oliver Edvardsen	Norway	Forward	2025–present	—	29	4	
Carel Eiting	Netherlands	Midfielder	2018–2021	—	17	0	^{[36]}
Jurgen Ekkelenkamp	Netherlands	Midfielder	2018–2021	—	25	4	
Urby Emanuelson	Netherlands / Suriname	Midfielder	2004–2011	—	172	17	
Eyong Enoh	Cameroon	Midfielder	2008–2014	—	98	3	^{[37]}
Christian Eriksen	Denmark	Midfielder	2010–2013	—	113	25	
Julien Escudé	France	Defender	2003–2006	—	61	6	
Jan Everse	Netherlands	Defender	1977–1980	—	69	0	
Jan Faberski	Poland	Midfielder	2024–present	—	—	—	^{[93]}
Filipe Luís	Brazil / Italy / Poland	Defender	2004–2005	—	—	—	^{[38]}
Gerrit Fischer	Netherlands	Forward	1934–1950	—	240	97	
Pál Fischer	Hungary	Forward	1989–1990	—	15	7	^{[39]}
Viktor Fischer	Denmark	Forward	2012–2016	—	79	24	
Kian Fitz-Jim	Netherlands / Suriname / Hong Kong	Midfielder	2020–2026	—	48	2	^{[39]}
Carlos Forbs	Portugal / Guinea-Bissau	Forward	2023–2025	—	22	2	
Hayden Foxe	Australia	Defender	1995–1997	—	—	—	
Jan Fransz	Netherlands	Midfielder	1958–1961	—	30	5	
Filip Frei	Switzerland	Defender	2019–2020	—	—	—	^{[39]}
Anton Gaaei	Denmark	Defender	2023–present	—	76	5	
Louis van Gaal	Netherlands	Midfielder	1972–1973	—	—	—	^{[M]}
Iván Gabrich	Argentina / Croatia	Forward	1996–1997	—	10	0	
Tomáš Galásek	Czech Republic	Midfielder	2000–2006	—	154	24	
Hans Galjé	Netherlands	Goalkeeper	1980–1986	—	70	1	^{[40]}
Gabri	Spain	Midfielder	2006–2010	—	86	7	
Siniša Gagula	Bosnia and Herzegovina / Croatia	Defender	2001–2004	—	—	—	
Felix Gasselich	Austria	Midfielder	1983–1985	—	56	16	
Martin van Geel	Netherlands	Midfielder	1979–1981	—	22	9	
Cor Geelhuijzen	Netherlands	Defender	1954–1960	—	125	0	
Ruud Geels	Netherlands	Forward	1974–1978	—	131	123	
Robert Gehring	Netherlands	Midfielder	1995–1997	—	—	—	
Liam van Gelderen	Netherlands / Suriname	Defender	2019–2022	—	2	0	
Dennis Gentenaar	Netherlands	Goalkeeper	2006–2009	—	7	0	
Finidi George	Nigeria	Forward	1993–1996	—	85	18	
Anwar El Ghazi	Netherlands / Morocco	Forward	2014–2017	—	70	20	
Giovanni	Brazil	Midfielder	2020–2022	—	—	—	^{[40]}
Oscar Gloukh	Israel	Midfielder	2025–present	—	29	6	
Joško Gluić	Croatia	Midfielder	1976–1977	—	7	0	
Edwin Godee	Netherlands	Midfielder	1982–1984	—	3	1	
Mika Godts	Belgium	Forward	2023–2026	—	78	21	
Tristan Gooijer	Netherlands / Indonesia	Defender	2021–2026	—	9	0	^{[41]}
Dean Gorré	Suriname / Netherlands	Midfielder	1997–1999	—	36	4	
Jay Gorter	Netherlands	Goalkeeper	2021–2025	—	9	0	^{[40]}
Tom de Graaff	Netherlands	Goalkeeper	2022–2024	—	—	—	
Eddy Pieters Graafland	Netherlands	Goalkeeper	1952–1958	—	154	0	
Ronald Graafland	Netherlands	Goalkeeper	2010–2011	—	—	—	
Danzell Gravenberch	Suriname / Netherlands	Defender	2013–2014	—	—	—	^{[41]}
Ryan Gravenberch	Netherlands / Suriname	Midfielder	2018–2022	—	72	7	
Florian Grillitsch	Austria	Midfielder	2022–2023	—	10	0	
Fred Grim	Netherlands	Goalkeeper	1986–1987; 1994–2002	—	101	0	
Alfons Groenendijk	Netherlands	Midfielder	1991–1993	—	22	1	
Jesper Grønkjær	Denmark / Greenland	Forward	1998–2000	—	55	12	
Cees Groot	Netherlands	Forward	1959–1964	—	152	132	
Henk Groot	Netherlands	Forward	1959–1963; 1965–1969	—	225	162	
Indy Groothuizen	Netherlands	Goalkeeper	2015–2017	—	—	—	^{[42]}
Zdeněk Grygera	Czech Republic	Defender	2003–2007	—	78	8	
Dragiša Gudelj	Serbia / Netherlands	Defender	2015–2017	—	—	—	
Nemanja Gudelj	Serbia / Netherlands	Midfielder	2015–2017	—	40	6	
Cedric van der Gun	Netherlands	Forward	2000–2003	—	35	9	^{[43]}
Arie Haan	Netherlands	Midfielder	1969–1975	—	132	23	
Bobby Haarms	Netherlands	Midfielder	1952–1960	—	58	1	^{[M]}
Winnie Haatrecht	Suriname / Netherlands	Defender	1983–1984	—	4	0	
Sébastien Haller	Ivory Coast / France	Forward	2021–2022	—	50	32	
Jan van Halst	Netherlands	Midfielder	1999–2002	—	36	0	^{[44]}
Piet Hamberg	Netherlands	Midfielder	1980–1982	—	18	4	
Mounir El Hamdaoui	Morocco / Netherlands	Forward	2010–2012	—	26	13	
Eddy Hamel	United States	Forward	1922–1930	—	125	8	
Johnny Hansen	Denmark	Midfielder	1992–1994	—	7	0	
Sontje Hansen	Netherlands / Curaçao	Forward	2019–2023	—	1	0	
Cor van der Hart	Netherlands	Defender	1947–1950	—	55	1	
Mickey van der Hart	Netherlands	Goalkeeper	2012–2015	—	—	—	^{[45]}
Abdel Malek El Hasnaoui	Netherlands / Morocco	Forward	2013–2015	—	—	—	
Jorrel Hato	Netherlands / Curaçao / Cape Verde	Defender	2022–2025	—	75	3	
Joeri Heerkens	Netherlands / Czech Republic	Goalkeeper	2025–present	—	—	—	
Jasper ter Heide	Netherlands / South Korea	Defender	2017–2020	—	—	—	
Erik Heijblok	Netherlands	Goalkeeper	2007–2008	—	—	—	
Jan-Arie van der Heijden	Netherlands	Midfielder	2007–2011	—	2	0	^{[46]}
Pascal Heije	Netherlands / Suriname	Midfielder	1999–2000	—	2	0	
John Heitinga	Netherlands	Defender	2001–2008; 2015–2016	—	154	17	
Jordan Henderson	England	Midfielder	2024–2025	—	37	1	
Nick Hengelman	Netherlands	Goalkeeper	2020–2021	—	—	—	
Sam Hendriks	Netherlands	Forward	2013–2016	—	1	0	
Caio Henrique	Brazil	Defender	2026–present	—	—	—	
Alvaro Henry	Netherlands / Suriname	Defender	2023–2024	—	—	—	
Youssouf Hersi	Netherlands / Ethiopia	Midfielder	2000–2001	—	9	0	
Danny Hesp	Netherlands	Defender	1987–1990	—	9	0	
Rio Hillen	Netherlands / Brazil	Defender	2020–2022	—	—	—	
Kristian Hlynsson	Iceland / Denmark	Midfielder	2020–2025	—	29	8	
Peter Hoekstra	Netherlands	Forward	1996–2001	—	68	14	^{[47]}
Danny Hoesen	Netherlands / Morocco	Forward	2012–2014	—	32	7	^{[48]}
Jermaine Holwyn	Netherlands / Suriname	Defender	1994–1995	—	—	—	
Marvin Höner	Germany	Forward	2013–2015	—	—	—	
Bertus Hoogerman	Netherlands	Goalkeeper	1956–1965	—	167	0	
Mike van der Hoorn	Netherlands	Defender	2013–2016	—	33	3	
Henk Hordijk	Netherlands	Midfielder	1917–1927	—	194	?	
Brutil Hosé	Curaçao / Netherlands	Forward	1998–2003	—	17	3	^{[49]}
Barry Hulshoff	Netherlands	Defender	1966–1977	—	283	17	^{[M]}
Klaas-Jan Huntelaar	Netherlands	Forward	2005–2009; 2017–2021	2008–2009	177	121	
Maximilian Ibrahimović	Sweden / Bosnia and Herzegovina / Croatia	Midfielder	2026	—	—	—	^{[50]}
Zlatan Ibrahimović	Sweden / Bosnia and Herzegovina / Croatia	Forward	2001–2004	—	74	35	
Oussama Idrissi	Morocco / Netherlands	Forward	2021	—	7	0	^{[50]}
Stanis Idumbo Muzambo	Belgium / France / Democratic Republic of the Congo	Midfielder	2021–2023	—	—	—	
Mohamed Ihattaren	Netherlands / Morocco	Midfielder	2022	—	—	—	^{[51]}
Pius Ikedia	Nigeria	Forward	1999–2005	—	25	2	^{[50]}
Kō Itakura	Japan	Defender	2025–2026	—	18	1	
Dies Janse	Netherlands	Defender	2022–present	—	4	0	
Wim Jansen	Netherlands	Midfielder	1980–1982	—	49	0	
Theo Janssen	Netherlands	Midfielder	2011–2012	—	31	9	
Vítězslav Jaroš	Czech Republic	Goalkeeper	2025–2026	—	19	0	
Henning Jensen	Denmark	Forward	1979–1981	—	56	7	
Victor Jensen	Denmark	Midfielder	2017–2023	—	2	0	^{[51]}
Diyae Jermoumi	Morocco / Netherlands	Defender	2021–2025	—	—	—	
Lucas Jetten	Netherlands / South Africa	Defender	2024–2026	—	—	—	
Virgall Joemankhan	Suriname / Netherlands	Forward	1986–1987	—	—	—	
Dennis Johnsen	Norway	Forward	2017–2020	—	3	0	^{[51]}
Frenkie de Jong	Netherlands	Midfielder	2016–2019	—	57	5	
Nigel de Jong	Netherlands / Suriname / Indonesia	Midfielder	2002–2006	—	96	9	
Siem de Jong	Netherlands	Midfielder	2007–2014; 2017–2020	2012–2014	193	61	^{[52]}
Wim Jonk	Netherlands	Midfielder	1988–1993	—	96	18	
Florian Jozefzoon	Suriname / Netherlands	Forward	2010–2012	—	4	0	^{[53]}
Juanfran	Spain	Defender	2005–2006	—	16	0	^{[54]}
Mariano Juan	Argentina	Midfielder	1996–2000	—	17	0	^{[55]}
Ruud Kaiser	Netherlands	Forward	1978–1980	—	9	2	
David Kalokoh	Netherlands / Sierra Leone	Forward	2023–present	—	—	—	
Joeri de Kamps	Netherlands	Midfielder	2011–2014	—	—	—	^{[56]}
Christopher Kanu	Nigeria	Defender	1996–2002	—	15	0	^{[57]}
Nwankwo Kanu	Nigeria	Forward	1993–1996	—	54	25	
Ahmetcan Kaplan	Turkey	Defender	2022–2026	—	19	0	
Óttar Magnús Karlsson	Iceland	Forward	2013–2016	—	—	—	^{[58]}
Neraysho Kasanwirjo	Netherlands / Suriname	Defender	2019–2021	—	—	—	^{[59]}
Thilo Kehrer	Germany / Burundi	Defender	2026–present	—	—	—	
Gerrit Keizer	Netherlands	Goalkeeper	1929–1948	—	302	0	
Marcel Keizer	Netherlands	Defender	1987–1989	—	4	0	^{[M]}
Piet Keizer	Netherlands	Forward	1960–1975	—	365	146	
Kerlon	Brazil	Midfielder	2009–2010	—	—	—	^{[59]}
Sinan Keskin	Turkey / Netherlands	Midfielder	2013–2015	—	—	—	
Gino van Kessel	Curaçao / Netherlands	Forward	2012–2014	—	—	—	^{[60]}
Wim Kieft	Netherlands	Forward	1979–1983	—	96	69	
Georgi Kinkladze	Georgia	Midfielder	1998–2000	—	12	0	^{[61]}
Ricardo Kishna	Netherlands / Suriname	Forward	2013–2015	—	34	6	
Jeppe Kjær	Denmark	Midfielder	2020–2022	—	—	—	
Davy Klaassen	Netherlands	Midfielder	2011–2017; 2020–2023; 2024–present	2025–2026	281	88	
Sean Klaiber	Suriname / Netherlands	Defender	2020–2022	—	15	0	
Gerrie Kleton	Netherlands	Forward	1971–1975	—	4	0	
Justin Kluivert	Netherlands / Suriname / Curaçao	Forward	2016–2018	—	44	12	
Patrick Kluivert	Netherlands / Suriname / Curaçao	Forward	1994–1997	—	70	39	
Abe Knoop	Curaçao / Netherlands	Goalkeeper	1990	—	—	—	
Richard Knopper	Netherlands	Midfielder	1997–2004	—	67	19	^{[62]}
Ronald Koeman	Netherlands	Midfielder	1983–1986	—	94	23	^{[M]}
Robert van Koesveld	Netherlands	Defender	2014–2015	—	—	—	
Dolf van Kol	Netherlands	Defender	1924–1932	—	174	25	^{[M]}
Don-Angelo Konadu	Netherlands / Ghana	Forward	2025–present	—	12	0	
Jan de Koning	Netherlands	Forward	1968–1970; 1971–1973	—	—	—	^{[M]}
Dico Koppers	Netherlands	Defender	2011–2013	—	8	0	^{[63]}
Dominik Kotarski	Croatia	Goalkeeper	2018–2022	—	—	—	^{[64]}
Chiel Kramer	Netherlands	Goalkeeper	2012–2013	—	—	—	
Michel Kreek	Netherlands	Defender	1989–1994	—	83	5	
Sten Kremers	Netherlands	Goalkeeper	2021–2024	—	—	—	
Rasmus Kristensen	Denmark	Defender	2018–2019	—	20	1	
Bojan Krkić	Spain / Serbia	Forward	2013–2014	—	24	4	^{[64]}
Michael Krohn-Dehli	Denmark	Forward	2006–2008	—	4	0	^{[65]}
Ruud Krol	Netherlands	Defender	1968–1980	—	339	23	
André Krul	Netherlands	Goalkeeper	2018–2019	—	—	—	
Tim Krul	Netherlands	Goalkeeper	2016–2017	—	—	—	^{[66]}
Mohammed Kudus	Ghana	Forward	2020–2023	—	67	17	
Samuel Kuffour	Ghana	Defender	2008	—	2	0	^{[67]}
Nicolas-Gerrit Kühn	Germany	Forward	2018–2020	—	—	—	^{[68]}
Piet van der Kuil	Netherlands	Forward	1956–1959	—	124	53	
Bas Kuipers	Netherlands	Defender	2013–2015	—	—	—	^{[69]}
Jussi Kujala	Finland	Midfielder	2000–2004	—	—	—	
Tschen La Ling	Netherlands / China	Forward	1975–1982	—	172	54	
Zakaria Labyad	Morocco / Netherlands	Midfielder	2018–2022	—	37	7	
Kostas Lamprou	Greece	Goalkeeper	2017–2019	—	3	0	
Denny Landzaat	Netherlands / Indonesia	Midfielder	1995–1996	—	1	0	
Noa Lang	Netherlands / Suriname	Midfielder	2017–2021	—	8	3	^{[70]}
Quido Lanzaat	Netherlands	Defender	1999–2000	—	1	0	
Peter Larsson	Sweden	Defender	1987–1991	—	58	4	
Terry Lartey Sanniez	Netherlands / Ghana	Defender	2015–2018	—	—	—	
Brian Laudrup	Denmark	Midfielder	1999–2000	—	31	13	
Michael Laudrup	Denmark	Midfielder	1997–1998	—	21	11	
Boban Lazić	Bosnia and Herzegovina / Netherlands	Forward	2013–2014	—	—	—	
Froylán Ledezma	Costa Rica	Forward	1997–2001	—	—	—	
Benjamin van Leer	Netherlands / Indonesia	Goalkeeper	2017–2020	—	—	—	^{[71]}
Rolf Leeser	Germany / Netherlands	Forward	1948–1955	—	32	6	
Peter Leeuwenburgh	Netherlands	Goalkeeper	2014–2018	—	—	—	^{[72]}
Leonardo	Brazil	Forward	2007–2009	—	39	5	
Marcos Leonardo	Brazil	Forward	2026–present	—	—	—	
Søren Lerby	Denmark	Midfielder	1975–1983	1981–1983	206	66	
Stanton Lewis	South Africa	Midfielder	2006–2010	—	—	—	^{[73]}
Nathan Leyder	Belgium	Defender	2016–2017	—	—	—	
Ruben Ligeon	Netherlands / Suriname	Defender	2011–2016	—	12	0	^{[74]}
Matthijs de Ligt	Netherlands	Defender	2016–2019	2018–2019	77	8	
Olaf Lindenbergh	Netherlands	Midfielder	2005–2007	—	30	0	
Rasmus Lindgren	Sweden	Midfielder	2005; 2008–2011	—	58	6	^{[75]}
Jari Litmanen	Finland	Forward	1992–1999; 2002–2004	—	179	96	
Enric Llansana	Netherlands / Spain	Midfielder	2019–2022	—	—	—	
Bogdan Lobonț	Romania	Goalkeeper	2000–2006	—	49	0	^{[76]}
Stanislav Lobotka	Slovakia	Midfielder	2013–2014	—	—	—	^{[77]}
Nicolás Lodeiro	Uruguay	Midfielder	2010–2012	—	21	2	
John van Loen	Netherlands	Forward	1991–1993	—	37	11	
Eli Louhenapessy	Netherlands / Indonesia	Midfielder	1996–1997	—	1	0	
Peter Lübeke	Germany	Midfielder	1977	—	6	0	
Lorenzo Lucca	Italy	Forward	2022–2023	—	14	2	^{[77]}
Jody Lukoki	Democratic Republic of the Congo / Netherlands	Forward	2010–2014	—	24	5	^{[78]}
Albert Luque	Spain	Forward	2007–2009	—	16	4	^{[55]}
Issam El Maach	Morocco / Netherlands	Goalkeeper	2018–2020	—	—	—	
Nikos Machlas	Greece	Forward	1999–2003	—	74	38	^{[79]}
Hedwiges Maduro	Netherlands / Aruba / Curaçao	Defender	2003–2008	—	70	9	
Lisandro Magallán	Argentina	Defender	2019–2023	—	3	0	^{[80]}
Aschraf El Mahdioui	Netherlands / Morocco	Midfielder	2015–2016	—	—	—	
Sivert Mannsverk	Norway	Defender	2023–2026	—	15	0	^{[80]}
Edgar Manucharyan	Armenia	Forward	2005–2010	—	9	0	^{[81]}
Răzvan Marin	Romania	Midfielder	2019–2021	—	10	0	^{[82]}
Stefan Marinković	Switzerland / Serbia	Defender	2013–2014	—	—	—	
Joop Martens	Netherlands	Midfielder	1920–1932	—	156	3	
Ar'jany Martha	Curaçao / Netherlands	Forward	2020–2024	—	8	0	
Derwin Martina	Curaçao / Netherlands	Defender	2013–2014	—	—	—	
Javier Martina	Curaçao / Netherlands	Forward	2008–2010	—	2	0	^{[83]}
Lisandro Martínez	Argentina	Defender	2019–2022	—	74	6	
Matheus	Brazil	Goalkeeper	2025	—	9	0	^{[82]}
Azor Matusiwa	Netherlands / Angola	Midfielder	2017–2019	—	1	0	^{[84]}
Maxwell	Brazil	Defender	2001–2006	—	114	9	
Noussair Mazraoui	Morocco / Netherlands	Defender	2016–2022	—	94	5	
Benni McCarthy	South Africa	Forward	1997–1999	—	36	20	
James McConnell	England	Midfielder	2025–2026	—	4	0	^{[82]}
Jakov Medić	Croatia / Bosnia and Herzegovina	Defender	2023–2025	—	6	1	^{[83]}
Walter Meeuws	Belgium	Defender	1984–1985	—	11	0	
Geert Meijer	Netherlands	Forward	1975–1979	—	77	18	^{[85]}
Henny Meijer	Netherlands / Suriname	Forward	1987–1988	—	26	11	
Mario Melchiot	Netherlands	Defender	1996–1999	—	73	1	
Dejan Meleg	Serbia	Midfielder	2013–2015	—	—	—	^{[86]}
David Mendes da Silva	Netherlands / Cape Verde	Defender	2003	—	—	—	^{[87]}
Alex Mendez	United States / Mexico	Midfielder	2019–2021	—	—	—	
Queensy Menig	Netherlands / Suriname	Forward	2014–2017	—	3	0	^{[88]}
Kofi Mensah	Netherlands / Ghana	Defender	1996–1999	—	21	0	
Stanley Menzo	Netherlands / Suriname	Goalkeeper	1983–1994; 1999–2000	—	249	0	^{[89]}
Timothy van der Meulen	Netherlands	Defender	2009–2010	—	—	—	^{[90]}
Wim Meutstege	Netherlands	Defender	1977–1980	—	60	1	
Andy van der Meyde	Netherlands	Forward	1997–2003	—	91	18	^{[91]}
Rinus Michels	Netherlands	Forward	1965–1971; 1975–1976	—	264	122	^{[M]}
Mido	Egypt	Forward	2001–2003; 2010	—	45	23	^{[92]}
Georges Mikautadze	Georgia / France	Forward	2023–2024	—	6	0	^{[33]}
Arkadiusz Milik	Poland	Forward	2014–2016	—	31	21	^{[94]}
Mateja Milovanović	Serbia / Netherlands	Defender	2021–2024	—	—	—	
Damon Mirani	Netherlands / Italy	Defender	2013–2016	—	—	—	
Gabriel Misehouy	Netherlands / Ghana	Midfielder	2022–2024	—	—	—	
Nicolae Mitea	Romania	Forward	2003–2008	—	53	12	
Gabriel Mofokeng	South Africa	Defender	2001–2004	—	—	—	
Henrik Moisander	Finland	Goalkeeper	2004–2006	—	—	—	
Niklas Moisander	Finland	Defender	2004–2006; 2012–2015	2014–2015	77	5	
Jorthy Mokio	Democratic Republic of the Congo / Belgium	Defender	2024–present	—	37	3	
Aaron Mokoena	South Africa	Defender	1999–2003	—	7	0	^{[94]}
Jan Mølby	Denmark	Midfielder	1982–1984	—	57	11	
Keje Molenaar	Netherlands	Defender	1980–1984	—	81	16	
Michael Mols	Netherlands / Indonesia	Forward	1990–1991	—	—	—	
Jano Monserrate	Spain	Midfielder	2026–present	—	—	—	
Raúl Moro	Spain	Forward	2025–2026	—	14	0	
Ger van Mourik	Netherlands	Defender	1950–1963	—	277	1	
Arnold Mühren	Netherlands	Midfielder	1971–1974; 1985–1989	—	161	30	^{[M]}
Gerrie Mühren	Netherlands	Midfielder	1968–1976	—	220	54	
Jan Mulder	Netherlands	Forward	1972–1975	—	56	16	
Bennie Muller	Netherlands	Midfielder	1958–1970	—	341	30	
Danny Muller	Netherlands	Midfielder	1989–1990	—	—	—	
Robert Murić	Croatia	Forward	2014–2017	—	2	0	^{[95]}
Kiki Musampa	Netherlands / Democratic Republic of the Congo	Forward	1994–1997	—	42	6	
Nordin Musampa	Netherlands / Democratic Republic of the Congo	Defender	2019–2022	—	—	—	
Jan de Natris	Netherlands	Forward	1914–1921; 1923–1925	—	133	?	
Johan Neeskens	Netherlands	Midfielder	1970–1974	—	124	33	
David Neres	Brazil	Forward	2017–2022	—	121	37	
Sven Nieuwpoort	Netherlands	Defender	2012–2014	—	—	—	^{[96]}
Tom Noordhoff	Netherlands	Defender	2013–2015	—	—	—	
Abdelhak Nouri	Netherlands / Morocco	Midfielder	2016–2018	—	9	0	
Klaas Nuninga	Netherlands	Forward	1964–1969	—	150	73	
Ché Nunnely	Netherlands / Suriname	Forward	2016–2019	—	—	—	
Anthony Obodai	Ghana	Midfielder	2001–2005	—	21	2	^{[97]}
John O'Brien	United States	Midfielder	1998–2005	—	63	3	^{[98]}
Lucas Ocampos	Argentina	Forward	2022–2023	—	4	0	^{[99]}
George Ogăraru	Romania	Defender	2006–2010	—	44	0	^{[99]}
Oleguer	Spain	Defender	2008–2011	—	36	2	
Sunday Oliseh	Nigeria / Belgium	Midfielder	1997–1999	—	54	8	
Jesper Olsen	Denmark	Forward	1981–1984	—	85	23	
André Onana	Cameroon	Goalkeeper	2015–2022	—	148	0	
André Ooijer	Netherlands	Defender	2010–2012	—	22	3	
Edo Ophof	Netherlands	Defender	1980–1988	—	158	16	
Luis Manuel Orejuela	Colombia	Defender	2017–2019	—	1	0	^{[100]}
Rene Osei Kofi	Netherlands / Ghana	Defender	2010	—	—	—	^{[101]}
Piet Ouderland	Netherlands	Forward	1955–1964	—	220	20	
Abdellah Ouazane	Morocco / Netherlands	Midfielder	2025–present	—	2	1	
Tarik Oulida	Netherlands / Morocco	Midfielder	1992–1995	—	18	3	
Marc Overmars	Netherlands	Forward	1992–1997	—	136	36	
Tom Overtoom	Netherlands	Midfielder	2009–2011	—	—	—	^{[101]}
Leeroy Owusu	Netherlands / Ghana	Defender	2014–2018	—	—	—	^{[102]}
Aras Özbiliz	Armenia / Netherlands	Forward	2010–2012	—	26	2	
Sergio Padt	Netherlands	Goalkeeper	2009–2011	—	—	—	^{[103]}
Maarten Paes	Indonesia / Netherlands	Goalkeeper	2026–present	—	11	0	
Marko Pantelić	Serbia	Forward	2009–2010	—	25	16	
Petri Pasanen	Finland	Defender	2000–2004	—	59	7	^{[104]}
Sebastian Pasquali	Australia / Italy	Midfielder	2017–2019	—	—	—	
Remko Pasveer	Netherlands	Goalkeeper	2021–2026	—	63	0	
Adriaan Pelser	Netherlands	Midfielder	1908–1915	—	41	3	
Jan Pelser	Netherlands	Goalkeeper	1908–1910	—	6	0	
Fons Pelser	Netherlands	Defender	1913–1926	—	192	18	
Harry Pelser	Netherlands	Midfielder	1939–1944	—	30	4	
Joop Pelser	Netherlands	Midfielder	1913–1926	—	198	8	
Kenneth Perez	Denmark / Spain	Midfielder	2006–2007; 2008	—	43	19	
Dan Petersen	Denmark	Forward	1991–1994	—	43	3	
Mike Petersen	Australia	Midfielder	1987	—	1	0	
Peet Petersen	Netherlands	Forward	1960–1965	—	95	17	
Stefan Pettersson	Sweden	Forward	1988–1994	—	195	99	
Steven Pienaar	South Africa	Midfielder	2001–2006	—	94	15	
Kik Pierie	Netherlands / United States	Defender	2019–2023	—	—	—	^{[105]}
Jaymillio Pinas	Netherlands / Suriname	Forward	2019–2021	—	—	—	
Mitchell Piqué	Netherlands / Suriname	Defender	1999–2003	—	4	1	^{[106]}
Rydell Poepon	Netherlands / Suriname	Forward	2006–2008	—	—	—	^{[107]}
Jan Potharst	Netherlands	Defender	1939–1952	1947–1952	237	0	
Christian Poulsen	Denmark	Midfielder	2012–2014	—	54	1	
Co Prins	Netherlands	Forward	1959–1963; 1965–1967	—	153	42	
Quincy Promes	Netherlands / Suriname	Forward	2019–2021	—	37	18	
Anton Pronk	Netherlands	Defender	1960–1970	—	258	6	
Joshua Pynadath	United States / India	Forward	2019–2020	—	—	—	
Kwame Quansah	Ghana	Midfielder	2000–2004	—	1	0	^{[108]}
Nando Rafael	Angola / Germany	Forward	2001–2002	—	—	—	
Diant Ramaj	Germany / Kosovo / Albania	Goalkeeper	2023–2025	—	23	0	
Hans Erik Ramberg	Norway	Midfielder	1994	—	—	—	
Christian Rasmussen	Denmark	Forward	2020–2025	—	12	1	^{[108]}
Piet van Reenen	Netherlands	Forward	1929–1942	—	177	214	
Youri Regeer	Netherlands	Midfielder	2021–2023	—	6	0	
Erik Regtop	Netherlands	Forward	1985–1990	—	3	0	^{[110]}
Daan Reiziger	Netherlands	Goalkeeper	2019–2021	—	—	—	
Michael Reiziger	Netherlands / Suriname	Defender	1990–1996	—	83	1	^{[110]}
Devyne Rensch	Netherlands / Suriname	Defender	2019–2025	—	105	10	
Johnny Rep	Netherlands	Forward	1971–1975	—	97	41	
Martijn Reuser	Netherlands	Midfielder	1993–1999	—	45	6	^{[111]}
Paul Reverson	Ghana / Netherlands	Goalkeeper	2026–present	—	—	—	
Ricardo van Rhijn	Netherlands / Curaçao	Defender	2008–2016	—	117	4	
Daniël de Ridder	Netherlands / Israel	Midfielder	2004–2005	—	30	3	
Jaïro Riedewald	Netherlands / Suriname / Indonesia	Defender	2013–2017	—	63	2	
Frank Rijkaard	Netherlands / Suriname	Midfielder	1980–1987; 1993–1995	—	261	59	
Julian Rijkhoff	Netherlands	Forward	2024–present	—	8	0	^{[112]}
Nico Rijnders	Netherlands	Midfielder	1969–1971	—	61	3	
Mats Rits	Belgium	Midfielder	2011–2013	—	—	—	
Johnny Roeg	Netherlands	Forward	1934–1936	—	26	16	
Roger	Spain	Midfielder	2006–2007	—	11	1	
Joey Roggeveen	Suriname / Netherlands	Goalkeeper	2021–2023	—	—	—	
Dennis Rommedahl	Denmark	Forward	2007–2010	—	61	8	^{[112]}
Lucas Rosa	Brazil	Defender	2025–present	—	32	0	
Mauro Rosales	Argentina	Midfielder	2004–2006	—	63	6	
Markus Rosenberg	Sweden	Forward	2005–2007	—	40	12	
Bryan Roy	Netherlands / Curaçao / Suriname	Forward	1988–1992	—	126	17	^{[M]}
Andrzej Rudy	Poland	Midfielder	1997–1999	—	41	3	
Daniele Rugani	Italy	Defender	2024–2025	—	15	0	^{[109]}
Gerónimo Rulli	Argentina	Goalkeeper	2023–2024	—	26	0	
Sebastián Rusculleda	Argentina	Midfielder	2005	—	—	—	^{[112]}
Lesley de Sa	Netherlands / Angola	Forward	2011–2016	—	13	1	^{[113]}
Anass Salah-Eddine	Netherlands / Morocco	Defender	2022–2024	—	7	0	^{[114]}
Tobias Sana	Sweden / Burkina Faso	Forward	2012–2015	—	17	4	
Davinson Sánchez	Colombia	Defender	2016–2017	—	32	6	
Jorge Sánchez	Mexico	Defender	2022–2024	—	17	2	^{[115]}
Gastón Sangoy	Argentina	Forward	2005	—	—	—	^{[114]}
Yaya Sanogo	France / Ivory Coast	Forward	2015	—	3	0	^{[115]}
Márcio Santos	Brazil	Defender	1995–1997	—	25	1	
Jeffrey Sarpong	Netherlands / Ghana	Midfielder	2006–2010	—	20	2	^{[116]}
Edwin van der Sar	Netherlands	Goalkeeper	1990–1999	—	226	1	
Raphaël Sarfo	Netherlands / Ghana	Defender	2023–2024	—	—	—	
Mauro Savastano	Netherlands / Italy	Defender	2015–2018	—	—	—	
Werner Schaaphok	Germany / Netherlands	Defender	1959–1965	—	148	1	^{[117]}
Xandro Schenk	Netherlands	Defender	2012–2013	—	—	—	^{[118]}
Kjell Scherpen	Netherlands	Goalkeeper	2019–2021	—	1	0	
Heinz Schilcher	Austria	Midfielder	1971–1973	—	35	3	
Robbert Schilder	Netherlands	Defender	2005–2009	—	23	1	^{[120]}
John van 't Schip	Netherlands / Canada	Forward	1981–1992	—	273	29	^{[M]}
Dick Schoenaker	Netherlands	Midfielder	1976–1985	1983–1985	271	86	
Arnold Scholten	Netherlands	Midfielder	1986–1990; 1995–1997	—	114	8	
Szabolcs Schön	Hungary	Forward	2018–2019	—	—	—	
Lasse Schöne	Denmark	Midfielder	2012–2019	—	201	49	
Piet Schrijvers	Netherlands	Goalkeeper	1974–1983	—	269	1	
Jan Schubert	Netherlands	Midfielder	1931–1943	—	202	31	
Dennis Schulp	Netherlands	Midfielder	1996–1997	—	5	1	
Perr Schuurs	Netherlands	Defender	2018–2022	—	61	2	^{[120]}
Clarence Seedorf	Netherlands / Suriname	Midfielder	1992–1995	—	65	11	
Stefano Seedorf	Netherlands / Suriname	Midfielder	2001–2004	—	5	0	^{[120]}
Thulani Serero	South Africa	Midfielder	2011–2017	—	88	8	
Charlie Setford	England / Netherlands	Goalkeeper	2020–present	—	—	—	
Tommy Setford	England / Netherlands	Goalkeeper	2023–2024	—	—	—	
Gerald Sibon	Netherlands	Forward	1997–1999	—	24	4	
Kaj Sierhuis	Netherlands / Greece	Forward	2018–2019	—	2	0	^{[121]}
Kolbeinn Sigþórsson	Iceland	Forward	2011–2015	—	80	31	
Victor Sikora	Netherlands / Poland	Forward	2002–2008	—	44	7	^{[122]}
Sonny Silooy	Netherlands / Indonesia	Defender	1980–1987; 1989–1996	—	268	0	
Bruno Silva	Uruguay	Defender	2008–2012	—	21	0	^{[123]}
Moses Simon	Nigeria	Forward	2013	—	—	—	
Daley Sinkgraven	Netherlands	Midfielder	2015–2019	—	63	1	
Donovan Slijngard	Netherlands / Suriname	Defender	2006–2008	—	—	—	^{[124]}
Steven van der Sloot	Netherlands / Cameroon	Defender	2020–2022	—	—	—	
Rodney Sneijder	Netherlands	Midfielder	2011–2012	—	—	—	^{[125]}
Wesley Sneijder	Netherlands	Midfielder	2002–2007	—	126	43	
Evander Sno	Netherlands / Suriname	Midfielder	2008–2011	—	19	4	^{[126]}
Tom Soetaers	Belgium	Midfielder	2004–2005	—	17	4	
Frits Soetekouw	Netherlands	Defender	1964–1967	1966–1967	86	2	
Dean Solomons	South Africa	Defender	2017–2020	—	—	—	
Wesley Sonck	Belgium	Forward	2003–2005	—	34	10	
Tom Søndergaard	Denmark	Forward	1969–1970	—	6	0	
Jan Sørensen	Denmark	Forward	1987	—	5	0	
Måns Sörensson	Sweden	Forward	2003–2004	—	—	—	^{[129]}
Borna Sosa	Croatia / Bosnia and Herzegovina / Germany	Defender	2023–2025	—	16	0	^{[126]}
Ronald Spelbos	Netherlands	Defender	1984–1988	—	95	19	
Fabian Sporkslede	Netherlands / Suriname	Midfielder	2012–2015	—	2	0	^{[127]}
Jaap Stam	Netherlands	Defender	2006–2007	2006–2007	31	1	
Frank Stapleton	Ireland	Forward	1987	—	4	0	^{[128]}
Arno Steffenhagen	Germany	Forward	1973–1976	—	58	19	
Maarten Stekelenburg	Netherlands	Goalkeeper	2002–2011; 2020–2023	2011	210	0	
Sean Steur	Netherlands	Midfielder	2024–2026	—	22	1	
Joop Stoffelen	Netherlands	Midfielder	1940–1950	—	193	22	
Sjaak Storm	Netherlands	Goalkeeper	1978–1985; 1989–1990	—	9	0	^{[1]}
Heinz Stuy	Netherlands / Germany	Goalkeeper	1967–1976	—	139	0	
Luis Suárez	Uruguay	Forward	2007–2011	2009–2011	110	81	
Suk Hyun-jun	South Korea	Forward	2009–2011	—	3	0	
Miralem Sulejmani	Serbia / Kosovo	Forward	2008–2013	—	103	29	
Wim Suurbier	Netherlands	Defender	1964–1977	—	392	16	
Sjaak Swart	Netherlands	Forward	1956–1973	—	461	170	
Josip Šutalo	Croatia / Bosnia and Herzegovina	Defender	2023–present	—	76	3	
Dušan Tadić	Serbia	Midfielder	2018–2023	2019–2023	161	77	
Nicolás Tagliafico	Argentina / Italy	Defender	2018–2022	–	115	9	
Simon Tahamata	Netherlands / Belgium / Indonesia	Forward	1976–1980	—	109	14	
Benjamin Tahirović	Bosnia and Herzegovina / Sweden	Midfielder	2023–2025	—	27	2	
Teemu Tainio	Finland	Midfielder	2010–2011	—	2	0	
Tunahan Taşçı	Turkey / Netherlands	Midfielder	2020–2021	—	—	—	
Ken Taylor	England	Midfielder	1948–1950	—	6	1	
Kenneth Taylor	Netherlands	Midfielder	2019–2026	—	130	25	
Marc-André ter Stegen	Germany	Goalkeeper	2026–present	—	—	—	^{[112]}
Kenny Tete	Netherlands / Mozambique / Indonesia	Defender	2013–2017	—	31	0	
Leo Thethani	South Africa	Forward	2017–2020	—	—	—	
Petri Tiainen	Finland	Midfielder	1986–1989	—	8	0	
Rachid Tiberkanine	Morocco / Belgium	Midfielder	2005–2006	—	—	—	
Jurriën Timber	Netherlands / Curaçao	Defender	2019–2023	—	85	6	
Quinten Timber	Netherlands / Curaçao	Midfielder	2019–2021	—	—	—	
Michael Timisela	Netherlands / Indonesia	Defender	2005–2007	—	4	1	
Henk Timmer	Netherlands	Goalkeeper	2002–2003	—	2	0	^{[129]}
Ole Tobiasen	Denmark	Defender	1997–2002	—	21	2	
Henri Toivomäki	Finland	Defender	2011–2013	—	—	—	^{[130]}
Takehiro Tomiyasu	Japan	Defender	2025–2026	—	7	0	
Jofre Torrents	Spain	Defender	2026–present	—	—	—	
Hatem Trabelsi	Tunisia	Defender	2001–2006	—	99	2	
Bertrand Traoré	Burkina Faso	Forward	2016–2017; 2024–2025	—	57	15	^{[131]}
Lassina Traoré	Burkina Faso	Forward	2019–2021	—	22	9	
Viktor Tsyhankov	Ukraine	Midfielder	2026–present	—	—	—	
Ignacio Tuhuteru	Netherlands / Indonesia	Forward	1993–1995	—	1	0	^{[132]}
Przemysław Tytoń	Poland	Goalkeeper	2022	—	—	—	
Precious Ugwu	Netherlands / Nigeria / Bosnia and Herzegovina	Defender	2024–2025	—	—	—	
Gus Uhlenbeek	Suriname / Netherlands	Defender	1990–1992	—	2	0	
Emre Ünüvar	Turkey / Netherlands	Forward	2024–present	—	—	—	
Naci Ünüvar	Turkey / Netherlands	Forward	2019–2025	—	—	—	^{[133]}
Ismael Urzaiz	Spain	Forward	2007–2008	—	3	0	
Damián van der Vaart	Netherlands / Spain	Midfielder	2025–present	—	—	—	
Rafael van der Vaart	Netherlands / Spain	Midfielder	2000–2005	2004–2005	117	52	
José Valencia	Ecuador	Defender	2003–2004	—	—	—	
Gerald Vanenburg	Netherlands / Suriname	Midfielder	1980–1986	—	173	64	
Bruno Varela	Cape Verde / Portugal	Goalkeeper	2019–2020	—	1	0	^{[96]}
Zoltán Varga	Hungary	Midfielder	1973–1974	—	12	2	
Velibor Vasović	Serbia / Montenegro	Defender	1966–1971	1970–1971	145	13	
Leo van Veen	Netherlands	Forward	1982–1983	—	23	0	
John Veldman	Netherlands / Suriname	Defender	1996–1997	—	17	0	
Joël Veltman	Netherlands	Defender	2012–2020	2017–2018	179	10	
Bram Verbist	Belgium	Goalkeeper	2000–2002	—	—	—	
Jeroen Verhoeven	Netherlands	Goalkeeper	2009–2012	—	3	0	
Frank Verlaat	Netherlands	Defender	1986–1989; 1999–2000	—	21	3	
Thomas Vermaelen	Belgium	Defender	2003–2009	2009	97	7	^{[133]}
Kenneth Vermeer	Netherlands / Suriname	Goalkeeper	2005–2014	—	103	0	^{[134]}
Vincent Vermeij	Netherlands	Forward	2013–2014	—	—	—	
Jan Vertonghen	Belgium	Defender	2006–2012	2011–2012	155	23	^{[135]}
Nick Viergever	Netherlands	Defender	2014–2018	—	84	6	
Ferdi Vierklau	Netherlands / Suriname	Defender	1998–2002	—	38	0	
Marciano Vink	Netherlands / Suriname	Midfielder	1988–1993	—	108	13	
Wim Volkers	Netherlands	Forward	1923–1936	—	265	129	^{[M]}
Hans Vonk	South Africa / Netherlands	Goalkeeper	2004–2006; 2008–2009	—	26	0	
Silvano Vos	Netherlands / Suriname	Defender	2021–2024	—	13	0	
Peter van Vossen	Netherlands	Forward	1993–1995	—	41	6	
Max de Waal	Netherlands	Midfielder	2019–2023	—	—	—	^{[135]}
Ezra Walian	Indonesia / Netherlands	Forward	2016–2017	—	—	—	
Walker	Brazil	Midfielder	2002–2003	—	—	—	^{[136]}
Wamberto	Brazil	Forward	1998–2004	—	122	26	^{[137]}
Wang Chengkuai	China	Midfielder	2013–2014	—	—	—	
Django Warmerdam	Netherlands	Forward	2014–2017	—	—	—	
Donny Warmerdam	Netherlands	Forward	2020–2023	—	—	—	
Wout Weghorst	Netherlands	Forward	2024–2026	—	51	18	
Arend van der Wel	Netherlands	Forward	1950–1955	—	93	43	
Heiko Westermann	Germany	Defender	2016–2017	—	4	0	
Ad Wheeler	England	Forward	1926–1927	—	1	1	
Gregory van der Wiel	Netherlands / Curaçao	Defender	2007–2012	—	130	12	
Rob Wielaert	Netherlands	Defender	2009–2011	—	19	1	^{[138]}
Martin Wiggemansen	Netherlands	Midfielder	1980–1982	—	20	2	
Dennis van Wijk	Netherlands	Defender	1981–1982; 1989–1990	—	—	—	^{[139]}
Owen Wijndal	Netherlands / Suriname	Defender	2022–present	—	51	1	^{[140]}
Erwin van Wijngaarden	Netherlands	Forward	1932–1949	—	163	73	
Menno Willems	Netherlands	Midfielder	1996–1997	—	2	0	
Ron Willems	Netherlands	Forward	1989–1993	—	47	15	
Aron Winter	Netherlands / Suriname	Midfielder	1986–1992; 1999–2003	—	187	46	^{[M]}^{[140]}
Dani de Wit	Netherlands	Midfielder	2016–2019	—	5	0	
Rob de Wit	Netherlands	Midfielder	1984–1986	—	61	16	
Richard Witschge	Netherlands	Midfielder	1986–1991; 1996–2003	—	139	12	^{[141]}
Rob Witschge	Netherlands	Midfielder	1985–1989	—	92	13	
Maximilian Wöber	Austria	Defender	2017–2019	—	30	1	^{[142]}
Cees de Wolf	Netherlands	Forward	1964–1967	—	2	1	
Nordin Wooter	Netherlands / Suriname	Forward	1994–1997	—	58	6	
Jan Wouters	Netherlands	Midfielder	1986–1992	—	150	21	^{[M]}
Gibson Yah	Netherlands / Nigeria	Midfielder	2021–2022	—	—	—	
Abubakari Yakubu	Ghana	Midfielder	1999–2005	—	65	0	^{[143]}
Murat Yıldırım	Turkey / Netherlands	Midfielder	2008–2009	—	—	—	
Saku Ylätupa	Finland	Midfielder	2017–2019	—	—	—	
Amin Younes	Germany / Lebanon	Midfielder	2015–2018	—	69	12	
Mustafa Yücedağ	Turkey	Midfielder	1985–1986	—	1	0	
Fouad Zahouani	Morocco	Defender	2026–present	—	—	—	
Deyovaisio Zeefuik	Netherlands / Suriname	Defender	2016–2018	—	6	0	
Marvin Zeegelaar	Netherlands / Suriname	Forward	2009–2011	—	4	0	^{[144]}
Demy de Zeeuw	Netherlands / Aruba	Midfielder	2009–2011	—	59	8	
Sten Ziegler	Denmark	Midfielder	1980–1981	—	36	1	
Niki Zimling	Denmark	Midfielder	2014–2015	—	9	0	^{[145]}
Oleksandr Zinchenko	Ukraine	Midfielder	2026	—	2	0	
Richairo Živković	Curaçao / Netherlands / Serbia	Forward	2014–2017	—	7	1	^{[146]}
Hakim Ziyech	Morocco / Netherlands	Midfielder	2016–2020	—	112	38	
Johan Zuidema	Netherlands	Midfielder	1976–1979	—	64	6	

Caps and goals accurate as of 8 August 2026 after the last match played against Heerenveen.

== Club captains ==
Dates	Name
1968–1970	(Netherlands) Bennie Muller
1970–1971	(Socialist Federal Republic of Yugoslavia) Velibor Vasović
1971–1972	(Netherlands) Piet Keizer
1972–1973	(Netherlands) Johan Cruyff
1973–1974	(Netherlands) Piet Keizer
1974–1980	(Netherlands) Ruud Krol
1980–1981	(Denmark) Frank Arnesen
1981–1983	(Denmark) Søren Lerby
1983–1985	(Netherlands) Dick Schoenaker
1985–1987	(Netherlands) Marco van Basten
1987–1990	(Netherlands) John van 't Schip
1990–1999	(Netherlands) Danny Blind
1999–2001	(Netherlands) Aron Winter
2001–2003	(Romania) Cristian Chivu
2003–2004	(Finland) Jari Litmanen
2004–2005	(Netherlands) Rafael Van der Vaart
2005–2006	(Czech Republic) Tomáš Galásek
2006–2007	(Netherlands) Jaap Stam
2007–2009	(Netherlands) Klaas-Jan Huntelaar
2009	(Belgium) Thomas Vermaelen
2009–2011	(Uruguay) Luis Suárez
2011	(Netherlands) Maarten Stekelenburg
2011–2012	(Belgium) Jan Vertonghen
2012–2014	(Netherlands) Siem de Jong
2014–2015	(Finland) Niklas Moisander
2015–2017	(Netherlands) Davy Klaassen
2017–2018	(Netherlands) Joel Veltman
2018–2019	(Netherlands) Matthijs de Ligt
2019–2023	(Serbia) Dušan Tadić
2023–2024	(Netherlands) Steven Bergwijn
2024–2025	(England) Jordan Henderson
2025–	(Netherlands) Davy Klaassen

== National team players ==
The following players were called-up to represent their national teams in international football and received caps during their tenure with AFC Ajax:

- **Argentina**
  - (Argentina) Lisandro Martínez (2019–2022)
  - (Argentina) Mauro Rosales (2004–2007)
  - (Argentina) Nicolás Tagliafico (2018–2022)
- **Armenia**
  - (Armenia) Edgar Manucharyan (2005–2010)
  - (Armenia) Aras Özbiliz (2010–2012)
- **Austria**
  - (Austria) Felix Gasselich (1983–1985)
  - (Austria) Florian Grillitsch (2022–2023)
  - (Austria) Heinz Schilcher (1971–1973)
  - (Austria) Maximilian Wöber (2017–2019)
- **Belgium**
  - (Belgium) Toby Alderweireld (2008–2013)
  - (Belgium) Jelle Van Damme (2002–2004)
  - (Belgium) Mika Godts (2023–2026)
  - (Belgium) **Jorthy Mokio (2024–present)**
  - (Belgium) Tom Soetaers (2004–2005)
  - (Belgium) Wesley Sonck (2003–2005)
  - (Belgium) Thomas Vermaelen (2003–2009)
  - (Belgium) Jan Vertonghen (2008–2013)
- **Bosnia & Herzegovina**
  - (Bosnia and Herzegovina) Benjamin Tahirović (2023–2025)
- **Brazil**
  - (Brazil) Antony (2020–2022)
  - (Brazil) David Neres (2017–2022)
  - (Brazil) Márcio Santos (1995–1997)
- **Burkina Faso**
  - (Burkina Faso) Bertrand Traoré (2016–2017, 2024–2025)
  - (Burkina Faso) Lassina Traoré (2019–2021)
- **Cameroon**
  - (Cameroon) Eyong Enoh (2008–2014)
  - (Cameroon) André Onana (2015–2022)
- **Colombia**
  - (Colombia) Davinson Sánchez (2016–2017)
- **Costa Rica**
  - (Costa Rica) Froylán Ledezma (1997–2001)
- **Croatia**
  - (Croatia) Borna Sosa (2023–2025)
  - (Croatia) **Josip Šutalo (2023–present)**
- **Czech Republic**
  - (Czech Republic) Tomáš Galásek (2000–2006)
  - (Czech Republic) Zdeněk Grygera (2003–2007)
  - (Czech Republic) Vítězslav Jaroš (2025–2026)
- **Denmark**
  - (Denmark) Lucas Andersen (2012–2016)
  - (Denmark) Frank Arnesen (1975–1981)
  - (Denmark) Nicolai Boilesen (2011–2016)
  - (Denmark) Mohamed Daramy (2021–2023)
  - (Denmark) **Kasper Dolberg (2016–2019; 2025–present)**
  - (Denmark) Christian Eriksen (2010–2013)
  - (Denmark) Viktor Fischer (2012–2016)
  - (Denmark) **Anton Gaaei (2023–present)**
  - (Denmark) Jesper Grønkjær (1998–2000)
  - (Denmark) Henning Jensen (1979–1981)
  - (Denmark) Michael Krohn-Dehli (2006–2008)
  - (Denmark) Søren Lerby (1975–1983)
  - (Denmark) Jan Mølby (1982–1984)
  - (Denmark) Jesper Olsen (1981–1984)
  - (Denmark) Kenneth Perez (2006–2007, 2008)
  - (Denmark) Dennis Rommedahl (2007–2010)
  - (Denmark) Lasse Schöne (2012–2019)
- **Egypt**
  - (Egypt) Mido (2001–2003, 2010)
- **England**
  - (England) Jordan Henderson (2024–2025)
- **Finland**
  - (Finland) Jari Litmanen (1992–1999, 2002–2004)
  - (Finland) Niklas Moisander (2004–2006, 2012–2015)
  - (Finland) Petri Pasanen (2000–2004)
  - (Finland) Petri Tiainen (1986–1989)
- **Georgia**
  - (Georgia (country)) Shota Arveladze (1997–2001)
  - (Georgia (country)) Georgi Kinkladze (1998–2000)
  - (Georgia (country)) Georges Mikautadze (2023–2024)
- **Germany**
  - (Germany) **Marc-André ter Stegen (2026–present)**
  - (Germany) Amin Younes (2015–2018)
- **Ghana**
  - (Ghana) Mohammed Kudus (2020–2023)
  - (Ghana) Anthony Obodai (2001–2005)
  - (Ghana) Abubakari Yakubu (1999–2005)
- **Greece**
  - (Greece) Angelos Charisteas (2005–2006)
  - (Greece) Nikos Machlas (1999–2003)
- **Hungary**
  - (Hungary) Pál Fischer (1989–1990)
- **Iceland**
  - (Iceland) Kristian Hlynsson (2023–2025)
  - (Iceland) Kolbeinn Sigþórsson (2011–2015)
- **Indonesia**
  - (Indonesia) **Maarten Paes (2026–present)**
  - (Indonesia) Ezra Walian (2016–2017)
- **Israel**
  - (Israel) **Oscar Gloukh (2025–present)**
- **Ivory Coast**
  - (Ivory Coast) Sébastien Haller (2021–2022)
- **Japan**
  - (Japan) Kō Itakura (2025–2026)
  - (Japan) Takehiro Tomiyasu (2025–2026)
- **Mexico**
  - (Mexico) Edson Álvarez (2019–2023)
  - (Mexico) Jorge Sánchez (2022–2024)
- **Morocco**
  - (Morocco) Ismaïl Aissati (2008–2012)
  - (Morocco) Nourdin Boukhari (2002–2006)
  - (Morocco) **Rayane Bounida (2025–present)**
  - (Morocco) Mounir El Hamdaoui (2010–2012)
  - (Morocco) Noussair Mazraoui (2016–2022)
  - (Morocco) **Abdellah Ouazane (2025–present)**
  - (Morocco) Hakim Ziyech (2016–2020)
- **Netherlands**
  - (Netherlands) Wim Addicks (1922–1931)
  - (Netherlands) Wim Anderiesen (1925–1940)
  - (Netherlands) Vurnon Anita (2005–2012)
  - (Netherlands) Ryan Babel (2004–2007; 2012–2013; 2020)
  - (Netherlands) Marco van Basten (1982–1987)
  - (Netherlands) Riechedly Bazoer (2014–2017)
  - (Netherlands) Donny van de Beek (2015–2020)
  - (Netherlands) **Steven Berghuis (2021–present)**
  - (Netherlands) Dennis Bergkamp (1986–1993)
  - (Netherlands) Steven Bergwijn (2022–2024)
  - (Netherlands) **Daley Blind (2008–2014; 2018–2022; 2026–present)**
  - (Netherlands) Danny Blind (1986–1999)
  - (Netherlands) Frank de Boer (1988–1998)
  - (Netherlands) Jan de Boer (1920–1933)
  - (Netherlands) Ronald de Boer (1987–1991; 1993–1998)
  - (Netherlands) Peter Boeve (1979–1988)
  - (Netherlands) Winston Bogarde (1994–1997)
  - (Netherlands) Hans Boskamp (1949–1954)
  - (Netherlands) John Bosman (1983–1988)
  - (Netherlands) Brian Brobbey (2020–2021; 2022–2025)
  - (Netherlands) Jasper Cillessen (2011–2016)
  - (Netherlands) Johan Cruyff (1964–1973; 1981–1983)
  - (Netherlands) Edgar Davids (1992–1996; 2007–2008)
  - (Netherlands) Jan van Diepenbeek (1929–1938)
  - (Netherlands) Dick van Dijk (1969–1972)
  - (Netherlands) Joop van Dort (1912–1922)
  - (Netherlands) Guus Dräger (1941–1951)
  - (Netherlands) Theo van Duivenbode (1964–1969)
  - (Netherlands) Anwar El Ghazi (2014–2017)
  - (Netherlands) Urby Emanuelson (2004–2011)
  - (Netherlands) Ge Fortgens (1906–1914)
  - (Netherlands) Ruud Geels (1974–1978)
  - (Netherlands) Eddy Pieters Graafland (1952–1958)
  - (Netherlands) Ryan Gravenberch (2018–2022)
  - (Netherlands) Henk Groot (1959–1963; 1965–1969)
  - (Netherlands) Arie Haan (1969–1975)
  - (Netherlands) Jorrel Hato (2022–2025)
  - (Netherlands) John Heitinga (2001–2008; 2015–2016)
  - (Netherlands) Henk Hordijk (1917–1927)
  - (Netherlands) Barry Hulshoff (1966–1977)
  - (Netherlands) Klaas-Jan Huntelaar (2005–2009; 2017–2021)
  - (Netherlands) Frenkie de Jong (2016–2019)
  - (Netherlands) Nigel de Jong (2002–2006)
  - (Netherlands) Siem de Jong (2007–2014; 2017–2020)
  - (Netherlands) Wim Jonk (1988–1993)
  - (Netherlands) Piet Keizer (1960–1975)
  - (Netherlands) Wim Kieft (1979–1983)
  - (Netherlands) **Davy Klaassen (2011–2017; 2020–2023; 2024–present)**
  - (Netherlands) Justin Kluivert (2016–2018)
  - (Netherlands) Patrick Kluivert (1994–1997)
  - (Netherlands) Ronald Koeman (1983–1986)
  - (Netherlands) Dolf van Kol (1924–1932)
  - (Netherlands) Ruud Krol (1968–1980)
  - (Netherlands) Piet van der Kuil (1955–1959)
  - (Netherlands) Henk van der Linden (1939–1940; 1945–1948)
  - (Netherlands) Tschen La Ling (1975–1982)
  - (Netherlands) Matthijs de Ligt (2016–2019)
  - (Netherlands) Hedwiges Maduro (2003–2008)
  - (Netherlands) Stanley Menzo (1983–1994; 1999–2000)
  - (Netherlands) Andy van der Meyde (1997–2003)
  - (Netherlands) Rinus Michels (1965–1971; 1975–1976)
  - (Netherlands) Arnold Mühren (1971–1974; 1985–1989)
  - (Netherlands) Gerrie Mühren (1968–1976)
  - (Netherlands) Bennie Muller (1958–1970)
  - (Netherlands) Jan de Natris (1914–1921; 1923–1925)
  - (Netherlands) Johan Neeskens (1970–1974)
  - (Netherlands) Klaas Nuninga (1964–1969)
  - (Netherlands) Edo Ophof (1980–1988)
  - (Netherlands) Piet Ouderland (1955–1964)
  - (Netherlands) Marc Overmars (1992–1997)
  - (Netherlands) Remko Pasveer (2021–2026)
  - (Netherlands) Fons Pelser (1913–1926)
  - (Netherlands) Peet Petersen (1960–1965)
  - (Netherlands) Jan Potharst (1939–1952)
  - (Netherlands) Co Prins (1959–1963; 1965–1967)
  - (Netherlands) Quincy Promes (2019–2021)
  - (Netherlands) Anton Pronk (1960–1970)
  - (Netherlands) Michael Reiziger (1990–1996)
  - (Netherlands) Devyne Rensch (2020–2025)
- **Netherlands** (continued)
  - (Netherlands) Johnny Rep (1971–1975)
  - (Netherlands) Ricardo van Rhijn (2011–2016)
  - (Netherlands) Jaïro Riedewald (2013–2017)
  - (Netherlands) Frank Rijkaard (1980–1987; 1993–1995)
  - (Netherlands) Nico Rijnders (1969–1971)
  - (Netherlands) Bryan Roy (1988–1992)
  - (Netherlands) Edwin van der Sar (1990–1999)
  - (Netherlands) John van 't Schip (1981–1992)
  - (Netherlands) Dick Schoenaker (1976–1985)
  - (Netherlands) Piet Schrijvers (1974–1983)
  - (Netherlands) Clarence Seedorf (1992–1995)
  - (Netherlands) Sonny Silooy (1980–1987; 1989–1996)
  - (Netherlands) Wesley Sneijder (2002–2007)
  - (Netherlands) Ronald Spelbos (1984–1988)
  - (Netherlands) Maarten Stekelenburg (2002–2011; 2020–2023)
  - (Netherlands) Joop Stoffelen (1940–1950)
  - (Netherlands) Wim Suurbier (1964–1977)
  - (Netherlands) Sjaak Swart (1956–1973)
  - (Netherlands) Simon Tahamata (1976–1980)
  - (Netherlands) Kenneth Taylor (2020–2026)
  - (Netherlands) Kenny Tete (2013–2017)
  - (Netherlands) Jurriën Timber (2020–2023)
  - (Netherlands) Rafael van der Vaart (2000–2005)
  - (Netherlands) Gerald Vanenburg (1980–1986)
  - (Netherlands) Joël Veltman (2012–2020)
  - (Netherlands) Kenneth Vermeer (2005–2014)
  - (Netherlands) Nick Viergever (2014–2018)
  - (Netherlands) Wim Volkers (1923–1936)
  - (Netherlands) Peter van Vossen (1993–1995)
  - (Netherlands) Wout Weghorst (2024–2026)
  - (Netherlands) Gregory van der Wiel (2007–2012)
  - (Netherlands) Aron Winter (1986–1992; 1999–2003)
  - (Netherlands) Rob de Wit (1984–1986)
  - (Netherlands) Richard Witschge (1986–1991; 1996–2003)
  - (Netherlands) Jan Wouters (1986–1992)
  - (Netherlands) Demy de Zeeuw (2009–2011)
- **Nigeria**
  - (Nigeria) **Tolu Arokodare (2026–present)**
  - (Nigeria) Tijani Babangida (1996–2003)
  - (Nigeria) Calvin Bassey (2022–2023)
  - (Nigeria) Finidi George (1993–1996)
  - (Nigeria) Pius Ikedia (1999–2005)
  - (Nigeria) Christopher Kanu (1996–2002)
  - (Nigeria) Nwankwo Kanu (1993–1996)
  - (Nigeria) Sunday Oliseh (1997–1999)
- **Norway**
  - (Norway) André Bergdølmo (2000–2003)
- **Poland**
  - (Poland) Arkadiusz Milik (2014–2016)
  - (Poland) Andrzej Rudy (1997–1999)
- **Portugal**
  - (Portugal) Dani (1996–2000)
- **Republic of Ireland**
  - (Republic of Ireland) Frank Stapleton (1987)
- **Romania**
  - (Romania) Cristian Chivu (1999–2003)
  - (Romania) Bogdan Lobonț (2000–2006)
  - (Romania) Răzvan Marin (2019–2021)
  - (Romania) Nicolae Mitea (2003–2008)
  - (Romania) George Ogăraru (2006–2010)
- **Serbia**
  - (Serbia) Nemanja Gudelj (2015–2017)
  - (Serbia) Marko Pantelić (2009–2010)
  - (Serbia) Miralem Sulejmani (2008–2013)
  - (Serbia) Dušan Tadić (2018–2023)
  - (Serbia) Velibor Vasović (1966–1971) (Note: A Serbian-born footballer, Velibor Vasović represented Yugoslavia internationally, prior to the countries dissolution in 1994, with Serbia considered by both UEFA and FIFA as the only inherit successor to the national team of former Yugoslavia.)
- **South Africa**
  - (South Africa) Benni McCarthy (1997–1999)
  - (South Africa) Aaron Mokoena (1999–2003)
  - (South Africa) Steven Pienaar (2001–2006)
  - (South Africa) Thulani Serero (2011–2017)
  - (South Africa) Hans Vonk (2004–2006; 2008–2009)
- **South Korea**
  - (South Korea) Suk Hyun-jun (2009–2011)
- **Suriname**
  - (Suriname) Sean Klaiber (2020–2022)
  - (Suriname) Joey Roggeveen (2021–2023)
- **Sweden**
  - (Sweden) Kennedy Bakırcıoğlu (2007–2010)
  - (Sweden) Inge Danielsson (1968–1969)
  - (Sweden) Zlatan Ibrahimović (2001–2004)
  - (Sweden) Peter Larsson (1987–1991)
  - (Sweden) Rasmus Lindgren (2005; 2008–2011)
  - (Sweden) Stefan Pettersson (1988–1994)
  - (Sweden) Markus Rosenberg (2005–2007)
  - (Sweden) Tobias Sana (2012–2015)
- **Tunisia**
  - (Tunisia) Hatem Trabelsi (2001–2006)
- **Ukraine**
  - (Ukraine) **Viktor Tsygankov (2026–present)**
- **United States**
  - (United States) Sergiño Dest (2019–2020)
  - (United States) John O'Brien (1998–2005)
- **Uruguay**
  - (Uruguay) Nicolás Lodeiro (2010–2012)
  - (Uruguay) Bruno Silva (2008–2012)
  - (Uruguay) Luis Suárez (2007–2011)

- Players in bold actively play for Ajax and for their respective national teams. Years in brackets indicate career span with Ajax.

=== National team players by Confederation ===
Member associations are listed in order of most to least amount of current and former Ajax players represented Internationally

Total national team players by confederation
Confederation	Total	(Nation) Association
AFC	5	Indonesia (2), Japan (2), South Korea (1)
CAF	30	Nigeria (8), Morocco (7), South Africa (5), Ghana (3), Burkina Faso (2), Cameroon (2), Egypt (1), Ivory Coast (1), Tunisia (1)
CONCACAF	7	Mexico (2), Suriname (2), United States (2), Costa Rica (1)
CONMEBOL	10	Argentina (3), Brazil (3), Uruguay (3), Colombia (1)
OFC	0	
UEFA	194	Netherlands (115), Denmark (17), Belgium (8), Sweden (8), Romania (5), Serbia (5), Austria (4), Finland (4), Czech Republic (3), (Georgia (country)) Georgia (3), Armenia (2), Croatia (2), Germany (2), Greece (2), Iceland (2), Poland (2), (Bosnia and Herzegovina) Bosnia & Herzegovina (1), England (1), Hungary (1), (Republic of Ireland) Ireland (1), Israel (1), Norway (1), Portugal (1), Ukraine (1)

== Players in international tournaments ==
The following is a list of Ajax players who have competed in international tournaments, including the FIFA World Cup, FIFA Confederations Cup, UEFA European Championship, UEFA Nations League Finals, CONCACAF Nations League Finals, CONCACAF Gold Cup, the Copa América and the Africa Cup of Nations. To this date no Ajax players have participated in the AFC Asian Cup, or the OFC Nations Cup while playing for Ajax.

Cup	Players
(Italy) 1934 FIFA World Cup	(Netherlands) Wim Anderiesen (Netherlands) Jan van Diepenbeek
(France) 1938 FIFA World Cup	(Netherlands) Wim Anderiesen (Netherlands) Dick Been
(West Germany) 1974 FIFA World Cup	(Netherlands) Arie Haan (Netherlands) Piet Keizer (Netherlands) Ruud Krol (Netherlands) Johan Neeskens (Netherlands) Johnny Rep (Netherlands) Wim Suurbier
(Socialist Federal Republic of Yugoslavia) UEFA Euro 1976	(Netherlands) Ruud Geels (Netherlands) Ruud Krol (Netherlands) Piet Schrijvers (Netherlands) Wim Suurbier
(Argentina) 1978 FIFA World Cup	(Netherlands) Ruud Krol (Netherlands) Dick Schoenaker (Netherlands) Piet Schrijvers
(Italy) UEFA Euro 1980	(Netherlands) Piet Schrijvers
(France) UEFA Euro 1984	(Denmark) Jan Mølby (Denmark) Jesper Olsen
(West Germany) UEFA Euro 1988	(Netherlands) John Bosman (Netherlands) Arnold Mühren (Netherlands) John van 't Schip (Netherlands) Aron Winter (Netherlands) Jan Wouters
(Italy) 1990 FIFA World Cup	(Netherlands) Danny Blind (Sweden) Peter Larsson (Netherlands) Stanley Menzo (Sweden) Stefan Pettersson (Netherlands) Bryan Roy (Netherlands) John van 't Schip (Netherlands) Aron Winter (Netherlands) Richard Witschge (Netherlands) Jan Wouters
(Sweden) UEFA Euro 1992	(Netherlands) Dennis Bergkamp (Netherlands) Danny Blind (Netherlands) Frank de Boer (Netherlands) Wim Jonk (Netherlands) Stanley Menzo (Netherlands) Bryan Roy (Netherlands) John van 't Schip (Netherlands) Aron Winter
(Tunisia) 1994 Africa Cup of Nations	(Nigeria) Finidi George
(United States) 1994 FIFA World Cup	(Netherlands) Danny Blind (Netherlands) Frank de Boer (Netherlands) Ronald de Boer (Nigeria) Finidi George (Netherlands) Marc Overmars (Netherlands) Frank Rijkaard (Netherlands) Edwin van der Sar (Netherlands) Peter van Vossen
(England) UEFA Euro 1996	(Netherlands) Danny Blind (Netherlands) Ronald de Boer (Netherlands) Winston Bogarde (Netherlands) Edgar Davids (Netherlands) Peter Hoekstra (Netherlands) Patrick Kluivert (Netherlands) Michael Reiziger (Netherlands) Edwin van der Sar
(Burkina Faso) 1998 Africa Cup of Nations	(South Africa) Benni McCarthy
(France) 1998 FIFA World Cup	(Nigeria) Tijani Babangida (Netherlands) Frank de Boer (Netherlands) Ronald de Boer (Denmark) Michael Laudrup (South Africa) Benni McCarthy (Nigeria) Sunday Oliseh (Netherlands) Edwin van der Sar
(Ghana) (Nigeria) 2000 Africa Cup of Nations	(Nigeria) Tijani Babangida
(Belgium) (Netherlands) UEFA Euro 2000	(Romania) Cristian Chivu (Denmark) Jesper Grønkjær (Romania) Bogdan Lobonț (Netherlands) Aron Winter
(Mali) 2002 Africa Cup of Nations	(Egypt) Mido (Tunisia) Hatem Trabelsi
(South Korea) (Japan) 2002 FIFA World Cup	(Sweden) Zlatan Ibrahimović (Nigeria) Pius Ikedia (United States) John O'Brien (South Africa) Steven Pienaar (Tunisia) Hatem Trabelsi
(Tunisia) 2004 Africa Cup of Nations	(Tunisia) Hatem Trabelsi
(Portugal) UEFA Euro 2004	(Czech Republic) Tomáš Galásek (Czech Republic) Zdeněk Grygera (Netherlands) John Heitinga (Sweden) Zlatan Ibrahimović (Netherlands) Wesley Sneijder (Netherlands) Rafael van der Vaart
(Germany) 2005 FIFA Confederations Cup	(Greece) Angelos Charisteas (Tunisia) Hatem Trabelsi
(Egypt) 2006 Africa Cup of Nations	(Tunisia) Hatem Trabelsi
(Germany) 2006 FIFA World Cup	(Netherlands) Ryan Babel (Czech Republic) Tomáš Galásek (Czech Republic) Zdeněk Grygera (Netherlands) John Heitinga (Netherlands) Hedwiges Maduro (Sweden) Markus Rosenberg (Netherlands) Wesley Sneijder (Netherlands) Maarten Stekelenburg (Tunisia) Hatem Trabelsi
(Austria) (Switzerland) UEFA Euro 2008	(Netherlands) John Heitinga (Netherlands) Klaas-Jan Huntelaar (Netherlands) Maarten Stekelenburg
(Angola) 2010 Africa Cup of Nations	(Cameroon) Eyong Enoh
(South Africa) 2010 FIFA World Cup	(Cameroon) Eyong Enoh (Denmark) Christian Eriksen (Uruguay) Nicolás Lodeiro (Serbia) Marko Pantelić (Denmark) Dennis Rommedahl (Netherlands) Maarten Stekelenburg (Uruguay) Luis Suárez (Netherlands) Gregory van der Wiel (Netherlands) Demy de Zeeuw
(Argentina) 2011 Copa América	(Uruguay) Nicolás Lodeiro
(Poland) (Ukraine) UEFA Euro 2012	(Denmark) Christian Eriksen (Netherlands) Gregory van der Wiel
(South Africa) 2013 Africa Cup of Nations	(South Africa) Thulani Serero
(Brazil) 2014 FIFA World Cup	(Netherlands) Daley Blind (Netherlands) Jasper Cillessen (Netherlands) Joël Veltman
(France) UEFA Euro 2016	(Poland) Arkadiusz Milik
(Gabon) 2017 Africa Cup of Nations	(Burkina Faso) Bertrand Traoré
(Russia) 2017 FIFA Confederations Cup	(Cameroon) André Onana (Germany) Amin Younes
(Russia) 2018 FIFA World Cup	(Denmark) Kasper Dolberg (Denmark) Lasse Schöne (Argentina) Nicolás Tagliafico (Morocco) Hakim Ziyech
(Portugal) 2019 UEFA Nations League Finals	(Netherlands) Donny van de Beek (Netherlands) Daley Blind (Netherlands) Frenkie de Jong (Netherlands) Matthijs de Ligt
(Brazil) 2019 Copa América	(Brazil) David Neres (Argentina) Nicolás Tagliafico
(Egypt) 2019 Africa Cup of Nations	(Morocco) Noussair Mazraoui (Cameroon) André Onana (Morocco) Hakim Ziyech
(Europe) UEFA Euro 2020	(Netherlands) Daley Blind (Netherlands) Ryan Gravenberch (Netherlands) Davy Klaassen (Netherlands) Maarten Stekelenburg (Netherlands) Jurriën Timber
(United States) 2021 CONCACAF Nations League Finals	(Mexico) Edson Álvarez
(Brazil) 2021 Copa América	(Argentina) Lisandro Martínez (Argentina) Nicolás Tagliafico
(United States) 2021 CONCACAF Gold Cup	(Mexico) Edson Álvarez (Suriname) Sean Klaiber
(Cameroon) 2021 Africa Cup of Nations	(Ivory Coast) Sébastien Haller (Ghana) Mohammed Kudus (Cameroon) André Onana
(England) 2022 CONMEBOL–UEFA Cup of Champions	(Argentina) Lisandro Martínez (Argentina) Nicolás Tagliafico
(Qatar) 2022 FIFA World Cup	(Mexico) Edson Álvarez (Netherlands) Steven Berghuis (Netherlands) Steven Bergwijn (Netherlands) Daley Blind (Netherlands) Davy Klaassen (Ghana) Mohammed Kudus (Mexico) Jorge Sánchez (Serbia) Dušan Tadić (Netherlands) Kenneth Taylor (Netherlands) Jurriën Timber (Netherlands) Remko Pasveer
(Netherlands) 2023 UEFA Nations League Finals	(Netherlands) Steven Bergwijn (Netherlands) Jurriën Timber
(United States) 2023 CONCACAF Nations League Finals	(Mexico) Edson Álvarez (Mexico) Jorge Sánchez
(United States) (Canada) 2023 CONCACAF Gold Cup	(Mexico) Edson Álvarez (Mexico) Jorge Sánchez
(Germany) UEFA Euro 2024	(Netherlands) Steven Bergwijn (Netherlands) Brian Brobbey (Turkey) Ahmetcan Kaplan (Croatia) Borna Sosa (Croatia) Josip Šutalo
(United States) 2024 Copa América	(Argentina) Gerónimo Rulli
(Canada) (Mexico) (United States) 2026 FIFA World Cup	(Japan) Kō Itakura (Croatia) Josip Šutalo (Japan) Takehiro Tomiyasu (Netherlands) Wout Weghorst

== Notes ==
M. ^{a} ^{b} ^{c} ^{d} ^{e} Player who later managed the club.

=== Loan spells ===
1. Stanley Aborah played for FC Den Bosch on loan from 2005 to 2006 before leaving the club after his loan spell.
2. Simon Adingra was loaned from Sunderland for the 2026–2027 Eredivisie season.
3. Ismaïl Aissati played for Vitesse on loan from 2010 to 2011, returning to Ajax for one more season, before leaving the club in 2012.
4. Jamal Akachar played for Cambuur on loan for three seasons (2004–05, 2005–06 and 2006–07, before leaving Ajax after his loan spells.
5. Chuba Akpom was loaned to Lille OSC for the 2024–25 season, followed by a season long loan spell to Ipswich Town, joining the club following his loan spell.
6. Robert Alberts played for Vancouver Whitecaps in the North American Soccer League on loan for one season in 1975.
7. Lucas Andersen played for Willem II on loan for the 2015–16 Eredivisie season, parting ways with Ajax after his loan spell.
8. Tolu Arokodare was loaned from Wolverhampton Wanderers for the 2026–27 Eredivisie season.
9. Gastón Ávila was loaned to Fortaleza in 2025, and Rosario Central for the 2026–27 season.
10. Amourricho van Axel Dongen was loaned to SC Heerenveen for the 2025–26 season, returning to Ajax after his loan spell.
11. Zakaria El Azzouzi played on loan for FC Twente in 2016, Sparta Rotterdam in 2016–17, and Excelsior in 2016–2017, leaving Ajax after his loan spells.
12. Youri Baas played for NEC on loan for the 2023–24 Eredivisie season.
13. Tijani Babangida played for Gençlerbirliği on loan from 2000 to 2001, Vitesse from 2001 to 2002 and for Al-Ittihad from 2002 to 2003, before leaving Ajax definitely that same year.
14. Ryan Babel was loaned from Galatasaray in 2020 for 6-months, returning to the Turkish club after his loan spell.
15. Hassane Bandé played for FC Thun in the Swiss Super League in 2020 on a 6-month loan spell from Ajax and for NK Istra 1961 in the 1. HNL for 6 months in 2021.
16. Kiran Bechan played for Sparta Rotterdam on loan during the 2003–04 season before leaving Ajax after his loan spell.
17. Sheraldo Becker played for PEC Zwolle on loan for the 2015–16 Eredivisie season, parting ways with Ajax after his loan spell.
18. Marco Bizot played for Cambuur on loan in 2011–12 before leaving Ajax after his loan spell.
19. Daley Blind played for Groningen on loan in 2010 before returning to Ajax to play four more seasons.
20. Emmanuel Boakye played for Heracles on loan during the 2006–07 season, before signing with the club after his loan spell.
21. Ilan Boccara played for Evian Thonon Gaillard on loan for the 2013–14 Ligue 1 season in France, before leaving Ajax after his loan spell.
22. Darko Bodul played for Sparta Rotterdam on loan for the 2009–10 season before leaving Ajax after his loan spell.
23. Derk Boerrigter played for HFC Haarlem on loan in 2007, departing from Ajax after his loan spell, only to return to Ajax in 2011, leaving Ajax after two seasons.
24. Roly Bonevacia played for NAC Breda on loan during the 2011–12 season, returning to Ajax for six months, before being loaned to Roda JC.
25. Branco van den Boomen was loaned to Angers SCO in 2025–26 season.
26. Sven Botman played for Heerenveen on loan for the 2019–20 season before parting ways with the club after his loan spell.
27. Nourdin Boukhari played for NAC Breda on loan from 2003 to 2004, before leaving Ajax in 2006.
28. Brian Brobbey was loaned from RB Leipzig in January 2022 on a six-month loan spell to finish the season.
29. Maher Carrizo was loaned to FC Copenhagen for the 2026–2027 season.
30. Mateo Cassierra played for Groningen in 2018 and for Racing in the Argentine Primera División for 2019–20 season before leaving Ajax.
31. Geoffrey Castillion played for RKC Waalwijk on loan during the 2011–12 season, Heracles in 2012–13 and NEC in 2014, leaving Ajax after consecutive loan spells.
32. Juan Castillo was loaned from Chelsea for the 2019–20 season, returning to England after his loan spell.
33. Francisco Conceição played for FC Porto on loan for the 2023–24 Primeira Liga season, moving to Porto permanently after his loan spell.
34. Daniel Cruz played for Germinal Beerschot on loan in 2002 before returning to Ajax for one more season.
35. Isaac Cuenca was loaned from Barcelona in 2013 during the winter transfer window, playing for Ajax for the remainder of the 2012–13 season.
36. Jason Culina played for Germinal Beerschot on loan in 2001, and was loaned to De Graafschap for the 2002–03 season, returning to Ajax for one more season.
37. Darío Cvitanich played for Pachuca on loan in 2010, and was loaned out to Boca Juniors for the 2011–12 season, leaving Ajax after his loan spell.
38. Eskild Dall played for Aarhus GF on loan for the second half of the 2021–22 season on a 6-month loan spell.
39. Danilo played for FC Twente on loan for the 2020–21 season, returning to Ajax after his loan spell.
40. Mohamed Daramy was loaned to Copenhagen for the 2022–23 season.
41. Erik De Haan played for Telstar on loan in 1986, returning to Ajax and remaining with the club for two more years.
42. Tom De Mul played for Vitesse on loan for the 2005–06 season, returning to Ajax for one more season.
43. Andrey Demchenko played for CSKA Moscow on loan in 1997, returning to Ajax to finish the calendar year.
44. Patrickson Delgado was loaned from Independiente del Valle for the 2021–22 and the 2022–23 season.
45. Joey Didulica played for Germinal Beerschot in 2001, returning to Ajax for two more seasons, before leaving the club.
46. Mitchell Dijks played for Heerenveen on loan for the 2013–14 season, where he is currently active.
47. Mitchell Donald played for Willem II in 2010, returning to Ajax for just one more season.
48. Darl Douglas played for RBC on loan for the 2000–01 Eredivisie season, followed by two consecutive loan spells with HFC Haarlem before parting ways with Ajax.
49. Terrence Douglas was loaned to FC Den Bosch midway through the 2021–22 season.
50. Lerin Duarte played for Heerenveen on a 6-month loan spell in 2015, spending another 6-month loan spell with NAC Breda before departing from Ajax.
51. Zé Eduardo was loaned to Ajax from Cruzeiro for the 2009–10 season, returning to his club after his loan spell.
52. Carel Eiting played for Huddersfield Town in the EFL Championship on loan from Ajax in the 2020–21 season.
53. Eyong Enoh was loaned to Fulham for six months during the 2012–13 season and to Antalyaspor for six months in 2013–14 before leaving the club.
54. Kian Fitz-Jim was loaned to SBV Excelsior for the first half of the 2023–24 Eredivisie season, returning to Ajax in the Winter transfer window.
55. Filip Frei was loaned from FC Zürich for the 2019–20 season, returning to Switzerland after his loan spell.
56. Filipe Luís was loaned to Ajax from Figueirense for the 2004–05 season before leaving Ajax after his loan spell.
57. Pál Fischer was loaned to Ajax from Ferencváros for the 1989–90 season, returning to Hungary after his loan spell.
58. Hans Galjé played for Utrecht on loan in 1986, before leaving Ajax after his loan period.
59. Giovanni played for Telstar on a 6-month loan spell in 2022.
60. Tristan Gooijer was loaned to PEC Zwolle for the 2024–25 season.
61. Jay Gorter was loaned to Scottish Premiership side Aberdeen for the remainder of the 2022–23 season
62. Danzell Gravenberch played for N.E.C. on loan for the second half of the 2013–14 season, leaving Ajax shortly after his return.
63. Indy Groothuizen played for Nordsjælland in the Danish Superliga in 2016–17, parting ways with Ajax following his loan spell.
64. Cedric van der Gun played for Willem II on loan for the 2002–03 season, leaving Ajax after his loan spell.
65. Jan van Halst played for Fortuna Sittard on loan for the 2000–01 season, returning to Ajax for one more season after his loan spell.
66. Mickey van der Hart played for Go Ahead Eagles on loan for the 2013–14 Eredivisie season, leaving Ajax following his loan spell.
67. Jan-Arie van der Heijden played two consecutive loan spells from 2009 to 2011 for Willem II, before leaving Ajax after his loan spell.
68. Peter Hoekstra played for Compostela for the 1999–2000 season, and Groningen in 2000–01, before leaving Ajax after his loan spell.
69. Danny Hoesen played for PAOK in the Greek Super League on loan from Ajax in 2014, parting ways with Ajax after his loan spell.
70. Brutil Hosé played on loan for De Graafschap in 2000–01, HFC Haarlem in 2001–02, and Sparta Rotterdam in 2002–03, leaving Ajax after his final loan spell.
71. Maximilian Ibrahimović was loaned from AC Milan on a 6-month loan spell during the winter transfer window of the 2025–26 season, returning to Italy after his loan spell.
72. Pius Ikedia played for Groningen on loan from 2002 to 2003 and RBC Roosendaal on loan from 2003 to 2005, before leaving Ajax that same year.
73. Oussama Idrissi was loaned from Sevilla for the remainder of the 2020–21 season.
74. Mohamed Ihattaren was loaned from Juventus midway through the 2021–22 season on a 1-year loan spell.
75. Dies Janse was loaned to FC Groningen for the 2025–26 season.
76. Vítězslav Jaroš was loaned from Liverpool, on a season long loan spell for the 2025–26 season, returning to England upon completion.
77. Victor Jensen was loaned to FC Nordsjælland on a 6-month loan spell for the second half of the 2020–21 season. In 2022 he was loaned for a year to Norwegian club Rosenborg BK.
78. Dennis Johnsen played for Heerenveen in 2019, and for PEC Zwolle in 2019–20 on loan, parting ways with Ajax after his loan spells.
79. Siem de Jong played on loan for Sydney FC in the 2018–19 A-League season in Australia, leaving Ajax after his loan spell.
80. Florian Jozefzoon played for NAC Breda on loan during the 2011–12 season, leaving Ajax after his loan spell.
81. Juanfran was loaned from Beşiktaş J.K. for the 2005–06 Eredivisie season, returning to Turkey after his loan spell.
82. Mariano Juan played for Racing Club on loan during the 1998–99 Argentine Primera División season, returning to Ajax for one more season, before leaving the club.
83. Joeri de Kamps played for Heerenveen on loan for the 2013–14 Eredivisie season, leaving Ajax after his loan spell.
84. Christopher Kanu played for Lugano on loan for the 1996–97 season, Alavés on loan in 2001, and Sparta Rotterdam on loan in 2002, leaving Ajax after his last loan spell.
85. Ahmetcan Kaplan was loaned to NEC Nijmegen for the 2025–26 Eredivisie season.
86. Óttar Magnús Karlsson played for Sparta Rotterdam on loan from Ajax for the 2015–16 Eerste Divisie season, parting ways with Ajax following his loan spell.
87. Thilo Kehrer was loaned from AS Monaco FC for the 2026–2027 Eredivisie season.
88. Kerlon was loaned to Ajax from Internazionale for the 2009–10 season, leaving Ajax after his loan spell.
89. Gino van Kessel played for Almere City on loan for the second half of the 2012–13 season, and AS Trenčín on loan for the first half of the 2013–14 season.
90. Georgi Kinkladze played for Derby County on loan for the 1999–2000 season, leaving Ajax after his loan spell.
91. Richard Knopper played for Aris on loan for the 2002–03 season and Heerenveen on loan for the 2003–04 season, leaving Ajax after his loan spell.
92. Don-Angelo Konadu was loaned to Lommel SK in Belgium for the 2026–27 season.
93. Dico Koppers was loaned to ADO Den Haag in the winter transfer window for the remainder of the 2012–13 season, leaving Ajax after his loan spell.
94. Dominik Kotarski was loaned to HNK Gorica for the 2021–22 season, where he is currently active.
95. Bojan Krkić was loaned to Ajax from Barcelona for one season in 2013, leaving the club after his loan spell.
96. Michael Krohn-Dehli played for Sparta Rotterdam on loan for the 2006–07 season, returning to Ajax for one more season before leaving the club.
97. Tim Krul was loaned from Newcastle United by Ajax for the 2016–17 season, returning to England after his loan spell.
98. Samuel Kuffour was loaned to Ajax from Roma for six months in 2008, leaving Ajax after his loan spell.
99. Nicolas-Gerrit Kühn played for Bayern Munich on loan from Ajax in 2020 before joining Bayern on a transfer that same year.
100. Bas Kuipers was loaned to Excelsior for the 2014–15 season, parting ways with Ajax thereafter.
101. Noa Lang played for Club Brugge on loan from Ajax for the 2020–21 Belgian Pro League season, transferring to the Belgian club at the end of the season.
102. Benjamin van Leer played for NAC Breda on loan for the 2018–19 Eredivisie season, returning to Ajax for one more season before leaving the club.
103. Peter Leeuwenburgh played for FC Dordrecht on loan from Ajax in 2015, returning to Amsterdam and departing three years later.
104. Stanton Lewis played for Ajax Cape Town on loan for 18 months for all of 2009 and the 2009–10 season, leaving Ajax after his loan spell.
105. Ruben Ligeon played for NAC Breda on loan for 6-months in 2015 and Willem II for 6-months the same year, before joining FC Utrecht on loan in 2016 and leaving Ajax after his final loan spell.
106. Rasmus Lindgren played for Groningen on loan from 2005 to 2006, transferring to them the following year and returning to Ajax in 2008, leaving the club four years later.
107. Bogdan Lobonț played for Dinamo București on a loan from 2001 to 2002, returning to Ajax before leaving the club in 2006.
108. Stanislav Lobotka played for Ajax on loan from AS Trenčín for the duration of the 2013–14 season, returning to Slovakia after his loan spell.
109. Lorenzo Lucca was loaned for the 2022–23 season from Pisa, on a year long loan spell.
110. Jody Lukoki played for Cambuur on loan for the 2013–14 season, leaving Ajax after his loan spell.
111. Albert Luque played for Málaga on loan for the 2008–09 season, before leaving Ajax after his loan spell.
112. Nikos Machlas played for Sevilla on loan from 2002 to 2003, before leaving Ajax after his loan spell.
113. Lisandro Magallán played for Alavés in the Spanish La Liga in 2019–20 and Crotone in the Italian Serie A the following season. He was then loaned to Anderlecht on a season long loan spell.
114. Sivert Mannsverk was loaned to Cardiff City for the 2024–25 season, followed by a season long spell at AC Sparta Prague, leaving Ajax after his loan spell.
115. Edgar Manucharyan played for HFC Haarlem on loan from 2009 to 2010, and AGOVV in 2010, before leaving Ajax that same year.
116. Răzvan Marin played for Cagliari in the Serie A for the 2020–21 season, joining the Italian side after his loan spell.
117. Javier Martina played for HFC Haarlem on loan in 2010, leaving Ajax after his loan spell.
118. Azor Matusiwa played for De Graafschap on loan from Ajax in 2019 before parting ways with the club after his loan spell.
119. James McConnell was loaned from Liverpool for the 2025–26 Eredivisie season.
120. Geert Meijer played for FC Amsterdam on loan for the 1976–77 season, returning to Ajax for two more seasons before leaving the club.
121. Dejan Meleg played for Cambuur in 2014–15 Eredivisie season, parting ways with Ajax after his loan spell.
122. David Mendes da Silva was loaned to Ajax from Sparta Rotterdam for six months, returning to hide former club after his loan spell.
123. Queensy Menig played for PEC Zwolle on loan from Ajax for two consecutive seasons from 2015 to 2017 before leaving the club after his loan spells.
124. Jakov Medić was loaned to VfL Bochum for the 2024–25 season.
125. Stanley Menzo played for HFC Haarlem on loan in 1984, returning to Ajax before leaving the club in 1994, only to return for the 1999–2000 season.
126. Timothy van der Meulen played for HFC Haarlem on loan in 2010, leaving Ajax after his loan spell.
127. Andy van der Meyde played for Twente on loan in the 1999–2000 season, returning to Ajax for three more seasons before leaving the club.
128. Mido played for Celta de Vigo on a loan in 2003, before leaving Ajax, only to return in 2010 on a loan from Middlesbrough before leaving Ajax the same year.
129. Aaron Mokoena played for Germinal Beerschot on loan in 2001, and again in 2002, returning to Ajax for one more season before leaving the club.
130. Georges Mikautadze was loaned to FC Metz in 2024, on a 6-month loan spell to his former club, moving back to Metz permanently after his loan spell.
131. Arkadiusz Milik was loaned from Bayer Leverkusen in 2014, returning to Ajax for one more season after his loan spell in 2015–16 before leaving the club.
132. Robert Murić played for Pescara on loan from Ajax for the 2016–17 Serie B season, leaving Ajax after his loan spell.
133. Sven Nieuwpoort played for Almere City on loan during the 2012–13 season, where he transferred during the winter transfer window, and once more for the 2013–14 season, before leaving Ajax.
134. Anthony Obodai played for Germinal Beerschot on loan during the 2002–03 season, returning to Ajax for two more seasons before leaving the club.
135. John O'Brien played for Utrecht on loan from 1998 to 1999, returning to Ajax before leaving the club in 2005.
136. Lucas Ocampos was loaned from Sevilla FC for the 2022–23 season, returning to Sevilla early in January 2023 in the winter transfer window.
137. George Ogăraru played for Steaua București during the 2008–09 season, returning to Ajax for one more season before leaving the club.
138. Luis Manuel Orejuela played for Cruzeiro in the Série A on loan from Ajax in 2019, joining the Brazilian side after his loan spell.
139. Rene Osei Kofi played for Almere City FC on loan in 2010, his loan spell and contract with Ajax were then terminated for unsportsmanlike conduct.
140. Tom Overtoom played for HFC Haarlem on loan in 2009, returning to Ajax for one more season after his loan spell before leaving the club.
141. Leeroy Owusu played for Excelsior in 2016–17 and Almere City and 2017–18 on loan from Ajax, parting ways with the club after his loan spells.
142. Sergio Padt played for HFC Haarlem on loan in 2010, and Go Ahead Eagles during the 2010–11 season, before leaving Ajax after his loan spell.
143. Petri Pasanen played for Portsmouth on loan in 2004, before leaving Ajax that same year.
144. Kik Pierie played for FC Twente in the 2020–21 and the 2021–22 Eredivisie seasons on loan, and for Excelsior for the second half of the 2022–23 season.
145. Mitchell Piqué played for Twente on loan for the 2000–01 season, HFC Haarlem in 2002, and RBC Roosendaal for the 2002–03 season, leaving Ajax after his loan spell.
146. Rydell Poepon played for Willem II on loan for the 2006–07 and 2007–08 seasons, before leaving Ajax after his loan spells.
147. Kwame Quansah played for Germinal Beerschot during the 2002–03 season and AIK during the 2003–04 season, leaving Ajax after his loan periods.
148. Christian Rasmussen played for FC Nordsjælland on loan for the 2023–24 Danish Superliga season.
149. Youri Regeer was loaned to SV Werder Bremen for the 2026–27 season.
150. Erik Regtop played for Telstar on loan in 1987–88 and for Groningen in 1988–89, returning to Ajax for one more season before leaving the club.
151. Michael Reiziger played for Volendam on loan from 1992 to 1993, and Groningen from 1993 to 1994, before returning to Ajax for one more season.
152. Martijn Reuser played for Vitesse on loan during the 1997–98 and 1998–1999 seasons, leaving Ajax after his loan spells.
153. Julian Rijkhoff was loaned to Almere City for the 2025–26 season, and for FC Andorra the following season.
154. Dennis Rommedahl played for N.E.C. on loan from 2008 to 2009, before returning to Ajax for one more season before leaving the club.
155. Daniele Rugani was loaned to Ajax from Juventus for the 2024–2025 season.
156. Sebastián Rusculleda was loaned to Ajax from Boca Juniors in 2005 for six months before leaving the club after his loan period.
157. Lesley de Sa played for Go Ahead Eagles in the 2014–15 season and Willem II in the 2015–16 season, leaving Ajax after his loan spells.
158. Anass Salah-Eddine was loaned to Twente by Ajax for the 2022–23 Eredivisie season.
159. Jorge Sánchez was loaned to FC Porto for the 2023–24 season, returning to Mexico after his loan spell.
160. Yaya Sanogo was loaned from Arsenal by Ajax for the 2015–16 Eredivisie season, returning to England after his loan spell.
161. Gastón Sangoy was loaned to Ajax from Boca Juniors in 2005 for six months before leaving the club after his loan period.
162. Jeffrey Sarpong played for N.E.C. on loan in 2010 for six months, leaving Ajax after his loan spell.
163. Werner Schaaphok played for Blauw-Wit on loan for the 1965–66 season and for AGOVV during the 1966–67 season before leaving the club after both his loan spells.
164. Xandro Schenk played for Go Ahead Eagles on loan for the remainder of the 2012–13 season, making the transfer during the winter transfer window, where he is currently active.
165. Robbert Schilder played for Heracles on loan for the 2006–07, and the 2007–08 seasons, returning to Ajax for one more season before leaving the club.
166. Perr Schuurs played for Fortuna Sittard on loan for 6- months in 2017–18, joining Ajax after his loan spell.
167. Stefano Seedorf played for NAC Breda on loan for the 2003–04 season, before leaving Ajax after his loan spell.
168. Kaj Sierhuis played for Groningen on loan for the 2018–19 season, remaining with Ajax for one more season before parting ways with the club.
169. Victor Sikora played for Heerenveen on loan in 2004–05 and played for NAC Breda on loan in 2005–06, 2006–07 and in 2007–08, leaving Ajax after his loan spells.
170. Bruno Silva played for Internacional on loan in 2010 before returning to Ajax for two more seasons.
171. Donovan Slijngard played for Groningen on loan in 2007, before returning to Ajax for one more season.
172. Rodney Sneijder played for Utrecht on loan for the 2011–12 season, before leaving Ajax after his loan spell.
173. Evander Sno played for Bristol City on loan for the 2009–10 season, returning to Ajax for one more season, before leaving the club.
174. Måns Sörensson was loaned from Swedish club Landskrona BoIS for the 2003–04 season before returning to his club after his loan spell.
175. Borna Sosa was loaned to Torino FC for the 2024–25 season.
176. Fabian Sporkslede played for Willem II on loan for the 2014–15 season, leaving the club after his loan spell.
177. Frank Stapleton played for Anderlecht on loan in 1988, before leaving Ajax after her loan spell.
178. Sjaak Storm played two loan spells for Excelsior in 1982–1983 and 1984–1985 season. He was later loaned from FC Groningen for the 1989–1990 Eredivisie season.
179. Marc-André ter Stegen joined Ajax on loan from FC Barcelona for the 2026–27 Eredivisie season.
180. Josip Šutalo was loaned to S.S. Lazio for the 2026–27 season.
181. Henk Timmer was loaned to Ajax from AZ for the 2002–03 season, returning to his club after the loan spell.
182. Henri Toivomäki played for Almere City on loan during the 2012–13 season before leaving Ajax after his loan spell.
183. Bertrand Traoré was loaned from Chelsea during the 2016–17 season, returning to England after his loan spell.
184. Ignacio Tuhuteru played for RBC Roosendaal on loan for the 1994–95 season before leaving Ajax after his loan spell.
185. Naci Ünüvar played for Trabzonspor on loan for the 2021–22 season. He was loaned to FC Twente the following season.
186. Bruno Varela was loaned from Benfica by Ajax for the 2019–20 season, returning to Portugal after his loan spell.
187. Thomas Vermaelen played for RKC Waalwijk on loan from 2004 to 2005 before returning to Ajax to play four more seasons.
188. Kenneth Vermeer played for Willem II on loan for the 2007–08 season before returning to Ajax to play six more seasons.
189. Nick Verschuren was loaned to FC Volendam for the 2025–26 season.
190. Jan Vertonghen played for RKC Waalwijk on loan from 2006 to 2007, returning to Ajax to play five more seasons.
191. Max de Waal played for PEC Zwolle on a 6-month loan spell in 2021–22 season, followed by a season-long loan spell with ADO Den Haag where he is currently active.
192. Walker played for Germinal Beerschot on loan in 2002–03 season, returning to Ajax for six months before leaving the club.
193. Wamberto played for R.A.E.C. Mons on loan in 2004 before leaving Ajax after his loan spell.
194. Rob Wielaert played for Roda JC on loan during the 2010–11 season, leaving Ajax after his loan spell.
195. Owen Wijndal played for Royal Antwerp on loan during the 2023–24 season.
196. Aron Winter played for Sparta Rotterdam on loan from 2001 to 2002, retiring from football after that season.
197. Richard Witschge played for Alavés on loan from 2001 to 2002 before returning to Ajax for one more season.
198. Maximilian Wöber played for Sevilla on loan in 2019, joining the Spanish side after his loan spell.
199. Abubakari Yakubu played for Vitesse on loan during the 2004–05 season departing from Ajax after his loan spell.
200. Marvin Zeegelaar played for Excelsior in 2011 before leaving Ajax after his loan spell.
201. Niki Zimling was loaned from Mainz 05 for the 2014–15 before leaving Ajax after his loan spell.
202. Richairo Živković played for Willem II on loan in 2015, and FC Utrecht for the 2016–17 season. leaving the club after his loan spells.

=== Loan spells by country ===
Nation	Loans	To	From	Clubs
Andorra	1	1	–	FC Andorra (1)
Argentina	6	4	2	Boca Juniors (3), Racing Club (2), Rosario Central (1)
Australia	1	1	–	Sydney FC (1)
Belgium	12	12	–	Germinal Beerschot (7), Anderlecht (2), Antwerp (1), Club Brugge (1), Lommel (1), Mons (1)
Brazil	5	4	1	Cruzeiro (2), Figueirense (1), Fortaleza (1), Internacional (1)
Canada	1	1	–	Vancouver Whitecaps (1)
Croatia	2	2	–	Gorica (1), Istra 1961 (1)
Czech Republic	1	1	–	Sparta Prague (1)
Denmark	6	6	–	Nordsjælland (3), Copenhagen (2), AGF (1)
Ecuador	1	–	1	Independiente del Valle (1)
England	15	6	9	Chelsea (2), Liverpool (2), Arsenal (1), Bristol City (1), Derby County (1), Fulham (1), Huddersfield Town (1), Ipswich Town (1), Middlesbrough (1), Newcastle United (1), Portsmouth (1), Sunderland (1), Wolverhampton Wanderers (1)
France	4	4	–	Angers (1), Evian Thonon Gaillard (1), Lille (1), Metz (1)
Germany	6	3	3	Bayer Leverkusen (1), Bayern Munich (1), Bochum (1), Mainz 05 (1), RB Leipzig (1), Werder Bremen (1)
Greece	2	2	–	Aris (1), PAOK (1)
Hungary	1	–	1	Ferencváros (1)
Italy	11	5	6	Juventus (2), Cagliari (1), Crotone (1), Inter Milan (1), Lazio (1), Milan (1), Pescara (1), Pisa (1), Roma (1), Torino (1)
Mexico	1	1	–	Pachuca (1)
Monaco	1	–	1	Monaco (1)
Netherlands	149	147	2	Groningen (11), HFC Haarlem (10), Sparta Rotterdam (10), Willem II (10), Heerenveen (8), NAC Breda (8), Twente (8), Excelsior (7), Almere City (6), PEC Zwolle (5), Utrecht (5), Vitesse (5), Cambuur (4), Go Ahead Eagles (4), RBC (4), De Graafschap (3), Heracles Almelo (3), NEC (3), RKC Waalwijk (3), Telstar (3), ADO Den Haag (2), AGOVV (2), Den Bosch (2), Fortuna Sittard (2), Roda JC Kerkrade (2), Volendam (2), Amsterdam (1), AZ (1), Blauw-Wit (1), Dordrecht (1)
Norway	1	1	–	Rosenborg (1)
Portugal	4	2	2	Porto (2), Benfica (1), Braga (1)
Romania	2	2	–	Dinamo București (1), Steaua București (1)
Russia	1	1	–	CSKA Moscow (1)
Saudi Arabia	1	1	–	Al-Ittihad (1)
Scotland	1	1	–	Aberdeen (1)
Slovakia	2	1	1	Trenčín (2)
South Africa	1	1	–	Ajax Cape Town (1)
Spain	13	8	5	Sevilla (5), Barcelona (3), Alavés (2), Celta de Vigo (1), Compostela (1), Málaga (1)
Sweden	2	1	1	AIK (1), Landskrona BoIS (1)
Switzerland	3	2	1	Lugano (1), Thun (1), Zürich (1)
Turkey	6	4	2	Galatasaray (2), Antalyaspor (1), Beşiktaş (1), Gençlerbirliği (1), Trabzonspor (1)
Wales	1	1	–	Cardiff City (1)

== See also ==
- Club van 100 (AFC Ajax)
- List of AFC Ajax records and statistics
