= Stanton Lewis (soccer, born 1987) =

South African soccer player

Personal information
- Full name: Stanton Ramon Lewis
- Date of birth: 3 August 1987 (age 39)
- Place of birth: Johannesburg, South Africa
- Position: Striker

Youth career
- 1998–2000: Orlando Pirates
- 2000–2002: Wits University
- 2002–2005: Ajax Cape Town

Senior career*
Years	Team	Apps	(Gls)
2005–2006	Ajax Cape Town	16	(1)
2006–2010	Ajax	0	(0)
2009–2010	→ Ajax Cape Town (loan)	2	(0)
2010–2011	Ajax Cape Town	5	(0)
2011	→ Kaizer Chiefs (loan)	8	(1)
2011–2012	AmaZulu	13	(4)
2012–2013	Golden Arrows	6	(0)
2013	Chippa United	3	(0)

International career^{‡}
2007	South Africa	2	(0)
- * Club domestic league appearances and goals as of 6 April 2013 ‡ National team caps and goals as of 18 June 2011

Stanton Lewis (born 3 August 1987) is a South African retired international soccer player who played as a striker.

== Early and personal life ==
Born in Johannesburg, Lewis has a son, born on 2 September 2008.

== Club career ==
Lewis began his youth career with Orlando Pirates, and also played for Wits University before moving to Ajax Cape Town in 2002. He made his professional league debut in 2005, and made a total of sixteen league appearances – scoring one goal – for Ajax Cape Town.

Lewis signed for Ajax of the Netherlands in July 2006, on a four-year contract. However, he never made a first-team appearance for Ajax, and he returned to Ajax Cape Town in January 2009, on an 18-month loan deal. The deal was made permanent in July 2010, and later that month Lewis went on trial with Swedish club Djurgården.

In January 2011, Lewis moved on loan to Kaizer Chiefs, following a bust-up with Ajax Cape Town manager Foppe de Haan, and Lewis has publicly announced that he would like to turn the loan deal into a permanent contract.

Rather than remaining with Kaizer Chiefs, Lewis signed a two-year deal with AmaZulu.

Lewis moved to Golden Arrows on 13 June 2012, signing a two-year deal, before moving to Chippa United in 2013.

== International career ==
Lewis represented the South African national team at the 2007 COSAFA Cup, making two appearances as a substitute.
