= Christopher Kanu =

Nigerian footballer

Chris Kanu
Personal information
- Full name: Christopher Ogbonna Kanu
- Date of birth: 4 December 1979 (age 46)
- Place of birth: Owerri, Nigeria
- Height: 1.73 m (5 ft 8 in)
- Position: Right-back

Youth career
- 1994–1995: Eagle Cement
- 1995–1996: Ajax

Senior career*
| Years | Team | Apps | (Gls) |
| 1996–2002 | Ajax | 15 | (0) |
| 1996–1997 | → Lugano (loan) | 19 | (0) |
| 2001 | → Alavés (loan) | 5 | (0) |
| 2002 | → Sparta Rotterdam (loan) | | |
| 2002–2003 | Top Oss | | |
| 2003–2005 | Peterborough United | 27 | (0) |
| 2006 | Wingate & Finchley | 1 | (1) |
| 2006–2009 | Eagle Cement | | |

International career
| 2000–2002 | Nigeria | 3 | (0) |
- * Club domestic league appearances and goals

Christopher Ogbonna Kanu (born 4 December 1979) is a Nigerian former professional footballer who played as a right-back.

== International career ==
In 2000 Kanu made his international debut for Nigeria in a World Cup qualifier against Eritrea.

== Personal life ==
Christopher Kanu is the younger brother of former Ajax, Portsmouth and Arsenal striker Nwankwo Kanu. In addition he is the stepbrother of Oghab midfielder Anderson "Anders" Gabolalmo Kanu and Henry Isaac.
