= Erik de Haan =

Dutch footballer

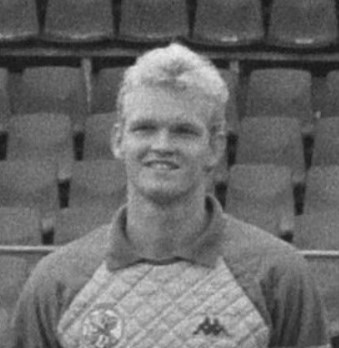

Personal information
- Date of birth: 15 May 1964 (age 62)
- Place of birth: Amsterdam, Netherlands
- Position: Goalkeeper

Youth career
- –1985: NFC Amstelveen

Senior career*
Years	Team	Apps	(Gls)
1985–1988	Ajax	0	(0)
1986	→ Telstar (loan)	9	(0)
1988–1992	MVV	89	(0)
1992–1994	Patro Eisden		
- * Club domestic league appearances and goals

Erik de Haan (born 15 May 1964 in Amsterdam) is a Dutch retired football player, who played as a goalkeeper. In the 1987 European Cup Winners' Cup final he was a substitute to Ajax's goalkeeper Stanley Menzo.

== Career ==
De Haan played youth football for NFC in Amstelveen, before becoming a back-up goalkeeper for Menzo at Ajax. In 1992 he left MVV for Patro Eisden.

== Personal life ==
He later was a goalkeeper coach at amateur side Best Vooruit en works as a Sales manager in sanitary products .
