= Filip Frei =

Swiss footballer (born 2001)

Personal information
- Date of birth: 7 January 2001 (age 25)
- Place of birth: Kilchberg, Switzerland
- Height: 1.71 m (5 ft 7 in)
- Position: Full-back

Team information
- Current team: Radnički Niš
- Number: 20

Youth career
- 2017–2019: FC Zürich
- 2019–2020: → AFC Ajax (loan)

Senior career*
Years	Team	Apps	(Gls)
2020–2022	FC Zürich	0	(0)
2021–2022	→ FC Wil (loan)	28	(0)
2022–	Radnički Niš	31	(0)

International career^{‡}
2017–2018	Switzerland U17	2	(0)
2019	Switzerland U19	3	(0)
- * Club domestic league appearances and goals as of 6 January 2025 ‡ National team caps and goals as of 1 June 2023

Filip Frei (born 7 January 2001) is a Swiss professional footballer who plays as a full-back for Serbian side Radnički Niš.

== Club career ==
Frei started his career with the youth team of FC Zürich. He called the attention of the AFC Ajax who brought him on loan for the 2019–20 season in the youth team. In Ajax he made 3 appearances in the 2019–20 UEFA Youth League however, he ended up returning to Zürich.

He debuted as senior with FC Zürich as an unused substitute in the 2020–21 season. In order to get more playing time, he accepted a loan move to FC Wil during the next season, which proved to be a right move as he made 28 appearances during the season in the Swiss Challenge League.

Serbian club Radnički Niš brought him for trials and ended signing a deal with Frei at the start of the 2022–23 Serbian SuperLiga season. His twin brother, Luka Frei, spent two weeks on trials in summer 2023 with Radnički, but, returned to Switzerland after it.

== International career ==
Frei represented Switzerland at several youth levels.
