= Heinz Schilcher =

Austrian footballer, manager, and scout (1947–2018)

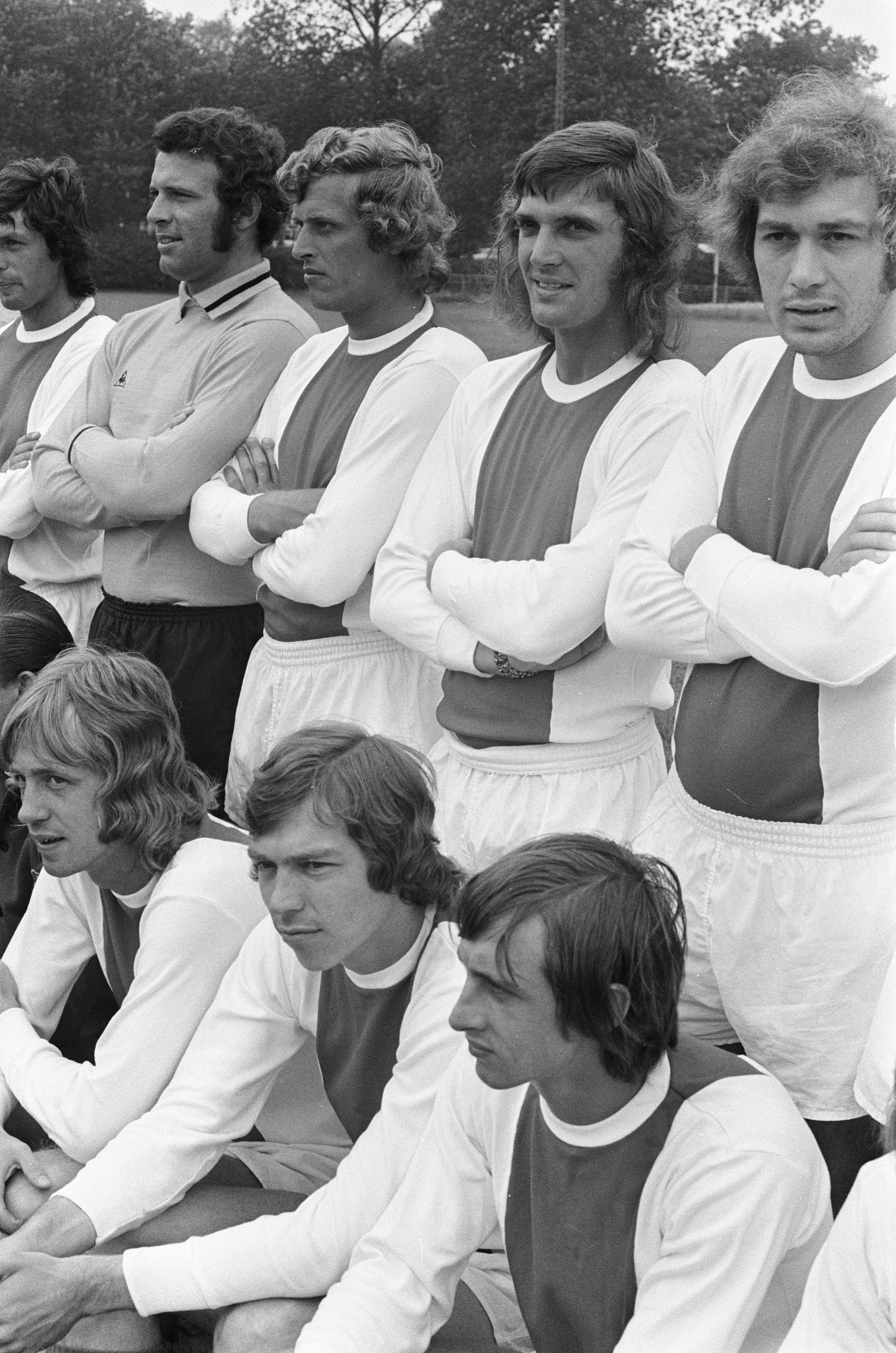
- Schilcher (standing on the far right, 1972)

Personal information
- Full name: Heinz Schilcher
- Date of birth: 14 April 1947
- Place of birth: Fohnsdorf, Austria
- Date of death: 20 July 2018 (aged 71)
- Position: Midfielder

Senior career*
Years	Team	Apps	(Gls)
1965–1969	Grazer AK		
1969–1971	Sturm Graz		
1971–1973	Ajax	35	(3)
1974	Paris FC	17	(1)
1974–1976	Nîmes	70	(9)
1976–1978	Strasbourg	59	(4)
1978–1982	Sturm Graz	128	(3)

International career
1973	Austria	1	(0)

Managerial career
- 1976: Strasbourg
- 2007–2018: Ajax (scout)
- * Club domestic league appearances and goals

Heinz Schilcher (14 April 1947 – 20 July 2018) was an Austrian football player and manager, who worked as a scout for AFC Ajax.

== International career ==
As a player, Schilcher was capped once for the Austria national team.

== Coaching career ==
In 1976 Schilcher briefly managed RC Strasbourg. On 1 July 2007, he signed a contract with AFC Ajax as a scout for Southern and Eastern Europe.

== Honours ==
AFC Ajax

- European Cup (2): 1971–72, 1972–73
- Eredivisie (2): 1971–72, 1972–73
- KNVB Cup: 1971–72
