= Werner Schaaphok =

German-Dutch footballer

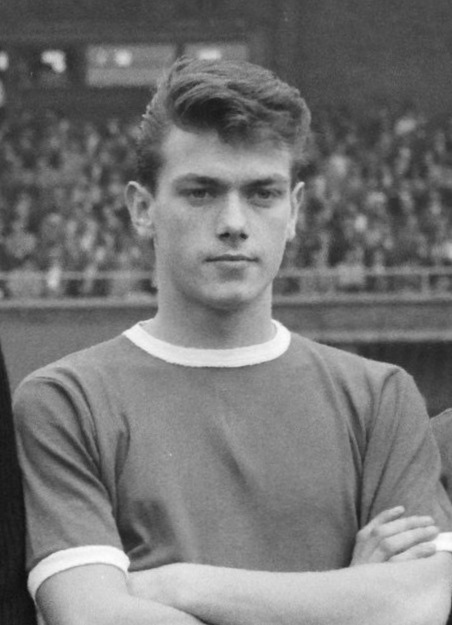
- Schaaphok in 1960

Personal information
- Date of birth: 22 December 1941 (age 84)
- Place of birth: Berlin, Germany
- Height: 1.78 m (5 ft 10 in)
- Positions: Defender; midfielder

Senior career*
Years	Team	Apps	(Gls)
1959–1965	Ajax	148	(1)
1965–1966	→ Blauw-Wit (loan)		(1)
1966–1967	→ AGOVV (loan)		(3)
1968	Chicago Mustangs	29	(2)
- * Club domestic league appearances and goals

Werner Schaaphok (born 22 December 1941) is a German-Dutch former professional footballer who played as a defender or midfielder for Ajax, Blauw-Wit, AGOVV and the Chicago Mustangs.

== Early life ==
Schaaphok was born during the Second World War in Berlin to two German parents. His original last name was Glanz. His parents divorced, and his mother remarried to a Dutchman whose last name was Schaaphok, and together they moved to Amsterdam. Werner took on the last name of his stepfather while maintaining German nationality and citizenship.

== Career ==
=== AFC Ajax ===
Schaaphok made his debut in the starting XI for Ajax in 1959. He went on to play in 148 league matches for Ajax, making it into the Club of 100 of the Amsterdam side. Sidelined by an injury for two weeks during the 1964–65 Eredivisie season, Schaaphok lost his starting position in the team under newly appointed coach Rinus Michels, to Frits Soetekouw. The team's performance improved under Michels, and Schaaphok received no more playing time. The other defenders on the team did not get injured, and Schaaphok found himself as a reserve player on the bench.

=== Blauw-Wit, AGOVV, and Chicago Mustangs ===
Schaaphok was subsequently loaned to Blauw-Wit, where his former coach Keith Spurgoen was the current manager. After playing one season with the Blauw-Wit side from Amsterdam, he moved to AGOVV on another loan basis for a season, where again his former manager Spurgoen had transferred to. After his second loan spell, he was sold to the Chicago Mustangs, for the amount of US$22,500 (then ƒ81.000 (guilders). He played for the Mustangs for one season, before his Wife got homesick, and he returned home to the Netherlands.

Back in the Netherlands, he tried to sign with local Amsterdam side DWS, but the club was unable to come to terms with his former club the Chicago Mustangs, where he was still under contract. He then played a few matches at amateur level with VVA/Spartaan, but was banned from professional football for two years by FIFA in 1969 due to the breach of his contract. This eventually led to his retirement.

== International career ==
Werner Schaaphok was called up to play for the Netherlands national team, but was unable to play, since he had never obtained Dutch citizenship. His reason for not becoming a naturalized citizen in the Netherlands, was due to the impending Dutch national service, as Werner did not want to serve in the military.

== Honours ==
Ajax

- Eredivisie: 1959–60
- KNVB Cup: 1960–61
- Intertoto Cup: 1961–62
