= Dolf van Kol =

Dutch footballer and manager

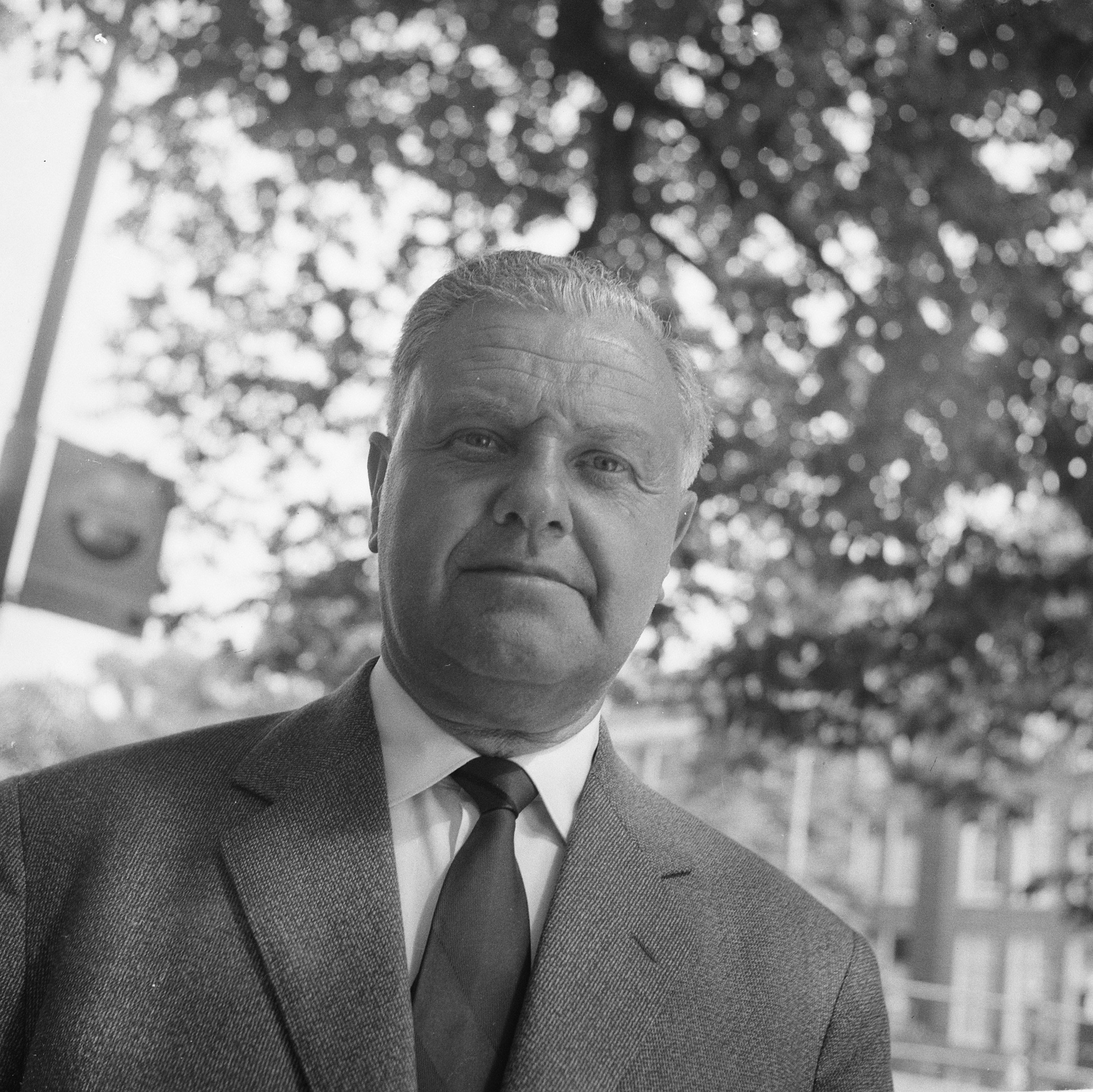

Personal information
- Full name: Adolf Henri van Kol
- Date of birth: 2 August 1902
- Place of birth: Amsterdam, Netherlands
- Date of death: 20 January 1989 (aged 86)
- Place of death: Amsterdam, Netherlands
- Position: Defender

Senior career*
Years	Team	Apps	(Gls)
1924–1932	Ajax	174	(25)

International career
1925–1931	Netherlands	33	(4)

Managerial career
- 1942–1945: Ajax
- * Club domestic league appearances and goals

Adolf Henri "Dolf" van Kol (2 August 1902 – 20 January 1989) was a Dutch footballer who earned 33 caps for the Netherlands national side between 1925 and 1931, scoring four goals. He also participated at the 1928 Summer Olympics. He played club football for Ajax, managed the club from 1942 to 1945.

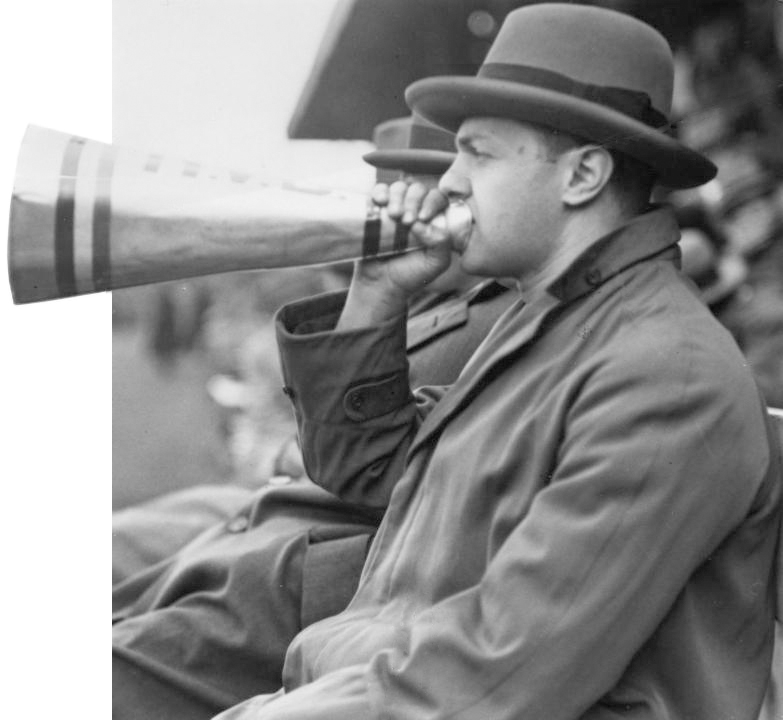
Van Kol in 1930.
