= Wim Addicks =

Dutch footballer

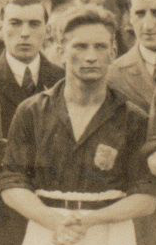
- Addicks in 1923

Personal information
- Full name: Willem Addicks
- Date of birth: 28 August 1896
- Place of birth: Amsterdam, Netherlands
- Date of death: 8 July 1985 (aged 88)
- Place of death: Amsterdam, Netherlands
- Position: Forward

Senior career*
Years	Team	Apps	(Gls)
1917–1922	AFC		
1922–1931	Ajax		

International career
1923	Netherlands	3	(2)
- * Club domestic league appearances and goals

Wim Addicks (28 August 1896 – 8 July 1985) was a Dutch footballer. He played in three matches for the Netherlands national football team in 1923.
