= Joop Stoffelen =

Dutch footballer (1921–2005)

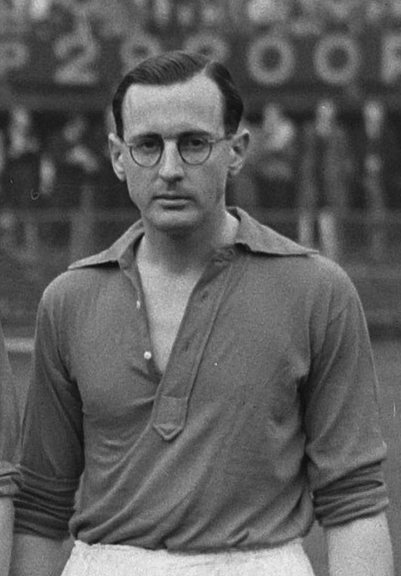
- Stoffelen in 1950

Personal information
- Full name: Johannes Hendricus Stoffelen
- Date of birth: 23 January 1921
- Place of birth: Amsterdam, Netherlands
- Date of death: 26 June 2005 (aged 84)
- Place of death: Lelystad, Netherlands
- Position: Midfielder

Youth career
- SEO
- Ajax

Senior career*
Years	Team	Apps	(Gls)
1940–1950	Ajax	193	(22)
1950–1951	RC Paris	10	(0)
1951–1953	Toulouse	6	(0)
1953–1954	Blauw-Wit Amsterdam		
195?–195?	Neerlandia		

International career
1947–1950	Netherlands	12	(0)

Managerial career
- De Spartaan
- DCG
- * Club domestic league appearances and goals

Johannes Hendricus "Joop" Stoffelen (23 January 1921 – 26 June 2005) was a Dutch footballer who played as a midfielder. Stoffelen mainly played for Ajax, but also had stints at RC Paris, Toulouse, Blauw-Wit Amsterdam and Neerlandia.

== Career ==
Stoffelen was fifteen years old when he first appeared for Ajax. Before that, he played with the amateurs of SEO, where he ended up in the first team after only three years of playing organised football. In the time that Stoffelen ended up at Ajax in late 1930s, it was wartime and at that time Ajax lost many players to the mobilization. It was also the period in which the successful team of the 1930s needed to be replaced.

Stoffelen made his debut as a central midfielder, replacing the legendary Wim Anderiesen in this position. On 24 March 1940, Stoffelen made his debut against KFC Koog aan de Zaan. After two and a half seasons in the position, Stoffelen moved to left midfielder. From that moment on, Jany van der Veen was preferred centrally. As a left mid, Stoffelen was highly appreciated. In the meantime he had also been promoted to team captain. He was also part of the Dutch squad for the 1948 Summer Olympics, but he did not play in any matches.

In the 1950–51 season he became the second Ajax player to become a professional abroad. In that season, he left for the French club RC Paris. He only played half a season with this club and then left for Toulouse. After two years in Toulouse, Stoffelen returned to the Netherlands. When he returned, he was only allowed to play football again after a year due to strict rules on professionalism in the Netherlands. On professionalism in football, Stoffelen since stated: "Sport om den brode is geen sport" ("sports for bread is not sports"). He returned to amateur football after serving a suspension, at Blauw-Wit Amsterdam. Afterwards played for a while at Neerlandia, where he also became a coach. He later also managed De Spartaan and DCG, and became coach of a team of former internationals. Only in 1992 he was fired by the Royal Dutch Football Association (KNVB) as coach of the former internationals.

Stoffelen died on 26 June 2005 at age 84 in Lelystad.
