= Dick Been =

Dutch footballer (1914–1978)

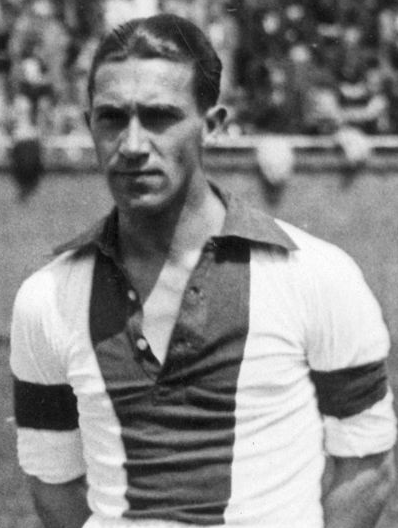

Personal information
- Full name: Dirk Been
- Date of birth: 28 December 1914
- Place of birth: Amsterdam, Netherlands
- Date of death: 20 May 1978 (aged 63)
- Place of death: Amsterdam, Netherlands
- Position: Defender

Senior career*
Years	Team	Apps	(Gls)
1936–1941	Ajax	57	(0)
1942–1945	Hamburger SV	28	(0)
- * Club domestic league appearances and goals

Dirk Been (28 December 1914 – 20 May 1978) was a Dutch football defender who was a non-playing squad member for the Netherlands in the 1938 FIFA World Cup.

== Club career ==
He played for hometown side Ajax, but during the Second World War he was forced to work in Germany. There, as a wartime Guest Player, he played for Hamburger SV
