= Noah Abid =

Tunisian-Dutch football midfielder

Personal information
- Full name: Noah Quinten Abid
- Date of birth: 30 January 2000 (age 26)
- Place of birth: The Hague, Netherlands
- Height: 1.66 m (5 ft 5 in)
- Position: Midfielder

Team information
- Current team: VV Wilhelmus

Youth career
- 2006–2008: Germinal Beerschot
- 2008–2010: Stockport County
- 2010–2013: Manchester City
- 2013–2018: Vitesse
- 2018–2019: Ajax
- 2019–2020: Almere City

Senior career*
Years	Team	Apps	(Gls)
2018–2019	Jong Ajax	1	(0)
2019–2020	Jong Almere City	12	(3)
2021	CS Sfaxien		
2021–2022	DOVO		
2022–2023	Die Haghe		
2023–2024	HBS		
2024–2026	Westlandia		
2026–	VV Wilhelmus		
- * Club domestic league appearances and goals as of 05:47, 19 November 2026 (UTC)

Noah Quinten Abid (born 30 January 2000) is a Dutch footballer who plays as a midfielder for VV Wilhelmus. He also holds Tunisian citizenship.

== Club career ==
Abid made his Eerste Divisie debut for Jong Ajax on 20 November 2018 in a game against Jong FC Utrecht as a 64th-minute substitute for Jasper ter Heide. He moved at the end of the season to join Jong Almere City. In February 2021 he joined CS Sfaxien, the club of former Ajax player Hatem Trabelsi who had made the move the other way around from Tunisia to the Netherlands.

In June 2021 he was released from the club without having made any league appearances. He returned to the Netherlands joining DOVO and competing in the Derde Divisie, before announcing his retirement from professional football for personal reasons. He later played for amateur sides Die Haghe, HBS and Westlandia.

== International career ==
On 30 May 2019, it was announced that Abid had been called up by Alain Giresse as part of the 30-man preliminary squad for the Tunisia national football team, joining their training facility in Croatia for the friendly fixture against Iraq on 7 June 2019 ahead of the 2019 Africa Cup of Nations.
