= Gabriel Mofokeng =

South African soccer player

Personal information
- Full name: Gabriel Mofokeng
- Date of birth: 9 February 1982 (age 44)
- Place of birth: Pretoria, South Africa
- Height: 1.76 m (5 ft 9 1/2 in)
- Position: Right back

Youth career
- 1999–2000: Ajax Cape Town
- 2000–2001: Ajax

Senior career*
| Years | Team | Apps | (Gls) |
| 2001–2004 | Ajax | 0 | (0) |
| 2001–2004 | → Jong Ajax | ? | (?) |
| 2006–2009 | FC AK | ? | (?) |
- * Club domestic league appearances and goals as of 7 July 2014 (UTC)

Gabriel Mofokeng (born 9 February 1982) is a retired South African professional football player who played as a right back for Ajax Cape Town, Ajax Amsterdam and FC AK during his career.

== Career ==
In 2000 Mofokeng was signed to a five-year contract with Ajax, making the transfer from the sister club Ajax Cape Town together with Steven Pienaar. Playing for the Ajax A1 (under-19) selection in his first year with Ajax, he joined the reserves team Jong Ajax in 2001, competing in the Beloften Eredivisie where they won the title twice, in 2001 and 2004. He was the starting right back for Jong Ajax, playing alongside José Valencia, Fronio Walker and Nando Rafael when they helped the reserves team to the semi-final of the 2004 Dutch Cup where they were defeated by FC Utrecht, preventing a final between the Ajax first team and their reserves.

Mofokeng also starred in the Dutch film released in 2000 about Steve Mokone, titled "De Zwarte Meteoor" (English: The Black Meteor), where he was a stunt double responsible for all the footwork featured in the film.

A South African under-23 international, in 2004 he suffered a serious knee injury forcing him out of football for a very long period. He eventually returned to football in 2006 when he signed with South African National First Division side FC AK from the West Rand of Johannesburg.
