= Henk Hordijk =

Dutch footballer

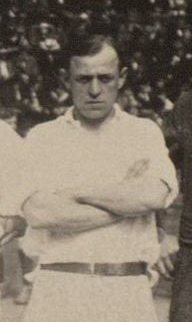

Personal information
- Full name: Hendrik Hordijk
- Date of birth: 19 September 1893
- Place of birth: Utrecht, Netherlands
- Date of death: 4 December 1975 (aged 82)
- Place of death: Amsterdam, Netherlands
- Position: Midfielder

Youth career
- 1913–1914: Blauw-Wit
- 1914–1917: Ajax

Senior career*
Years	Team	Apps	(Gls)
1917–1927	Ajax	194	

International career^{‡}
1919–1922	Netherlands	9	(0)
- * Club domestic league appearances and goals as of 1 April 2014 ‡ National team caps and goals as of 15:11, 1 April 2014 (UTC)

Hendrik "Henk" Hordijk (19 September 1893 – 4 December 1975) was a Netherlands association football player, who played as a midfielder for AFC Ajax and for the Netherlands national team.

== Career ==
Hordijk played 194 matches for Ajax from 1917 to 1927. He was a member of the first team that won the national championship in the 1917/1918 season. He was then selected to play for the Netherlands national football team, appearing in 9 matches for Oranje without scoring. In his last season with Ajax, 1926/27 he became the top scorer of the club with 19 goals in 21 match appearances.
