= List of AFC Ajax records and statistics =

== Club records ==
=== Largest victories ===
Listed are the largest victories of AFC Ajax, with at least eight goals scored.

Season	Competition	Round	Date	Club	Score	Location
1984–85	UEFA Cup	First round	19 September 1984	(Luxembourg) Red Boys Differdange	14–0	De Meer Stadion, Amsterdam, Netherlands
2009–10	KNVB Cup	Round of 16	23 December 2009	(Netherlands) WHC Wezep	1–14	Mulderssingel, Wezep, Netherlands
2020–21	Eredivisie	Round 6	24 October 2020	(Netherlands) VVV-Venlo	0–13	Covebo Stadion - De Koel, Venlo, Netherlands
1971–72	Eredivisie	Round 34	19 May 1972	(Netherlands) Vitesse	12–1	De Meer Stadion, Amsterdam, Netherlands
1916–17	Tweede Klasse West-A	Round 13	31 December 1916	(Netherlands) ZVV Zaandijk	11–0	Het Houten Stadion, Amsterdam, Netherlands
1910–11	Tweede Klasse West-B	Round 10	4 December 1910	(Netherlands) EDO	1–11	Kleverlaan, Haarlem, Netherlands
1924–25	Eerste Klasse West II	Round 16	11 January 1925	(Netherlands) UVV Utrecht	11–1	Het Houten Stadion, Amsterdam, Netherlands
1917–18	Eerste Klasse West-A	Round 20	20 January 1918	(Netherlands) HBS Craeyenhout	10–0	Het Houten Stadion, Amsterdam, Netherlands
1960–61	KNVB Cup	Fourth round	12 February 1961	(Netherlands) Rapiditas	10–0	Het Houten Stadion, Amsterdam, Netherlands
1979–80	European Cup	Round of 16	24 October 1979	(Cyprus) Omonia	10–0	De Meer Stadion, Amsterdam, Netherlands
1916–17	Tweede Klasse West-A	Round 14	11 March 1917	(Netherlands) Alcmaria Victrix	9–0	Het Houten Stadion, Amsterdam, Netherlands
1959–60	Eredivisie	Round 30	18 March 1960	(Netherlands) RKSV Volendam	9–0	De Meer Stadion, Amsterdam, Netherlands
1961–62	Intertoto Cup	Group stage	22 July 1961	(West Germany) FK Pirmasens	9–0	Olympic Stadium, Amsterdam, Netherlands
1972–73	Eredivisie	Round 12	5 November 1972	(Netherlands) Den Bosch	9–0	De Meer Stadion, Amsterdam, Netherlands
1973–74	Eredivisie	Round 18	6 January 1974	(Netherlands) Groningen	9–0	De Meer Stadion, Amsterdam, Netherlands
1985–86	Eredivisie	Round 17	8 December 1985	(Netherlands) Sparta Rotterdam	9–0	De Meer Stadion, Amsterdam, Netherlands
1998–99	KNVB Cup	Second round	29 October 1998	(Netherlands) UDI '19	9–0	De Meer Stadion, Amsterdam, Netherlands
2000–01	Eredivisie	Round 25	18 March 2001	(Netherlands) Sparta Rotterdam	9–0	Amsterdam Arena, Amsterdam, Netherlands
2014–15	KNVB Cup	Second round	24 September 2014	(Netherlands) JOS Watergraafsmeer	0–9	Olympic Stadium, Amsterdam, Netherlands
2021–22	Eredivisie	Round 5	18 September 2021	(Netherlands) Cambuur	9–0	Johan Cruyff Arena, Amsterdam, Netherlands
2021–22	KNVB Cup	Round of 16	20 January 2022	(Netherlands) Excelsior Maassluis	9–0	Johan Cruyff Arena, Amsterdam, Netherlands
1916–17	Tweede Klasse West-A	Round 3	8 October 1916	(Netherlands) LVV	9–1	Het Houten Stadion, Amsterdam, Netherlands
1931–32	Kampioenscompetitie	Final	3 April 1932	(Netherlands) Veendam	9–1	Het Houten Stadion, Amsterdam, Netherlands
1961–62	Intertoto Cup	Group stage	1 July 1961	(Switzerland) Zürich	9–1	Olympic Stadium, Amsterdam, Netherlands
1961–62	Eredivisie	Round 6	24 September 1961	(Netherlands) RKSV Volendam	9–1	De Meer Stadion, Amsterdam, Netherlands
1967–68	Eredivisie	Round 13	5 November 1967	(Netherlands) NEC	9–1	De Meer Stadion, Amsterdam, Netherlands
1981–82	Eredivisie	Round 24	21 March 1982	(Netherlands) FC Den Haag	9–1	De Meer Stadion, Amsterdam, Netherlands
1997–98	UEFA Cup	First round	30 September 1997	(Slovenia) Maribor	9–1	Amsterdam Arena, Amsterdam, Netherlands
1910–11	Tweede Klasse West-B	Round 3	16 October 1910	(Netherlands) AF & HC	8–0	Het Houten Stadion, Amsterdam, Netherlands
1916–17	Tweede Klasse West-A	Round 10	18 February 1917	(Netherlands) LVV	0–8	Huizumerlaan, Leeuwarden, Netherlands
1929–30	Kampioenscompetitie	Round 10	3 March 1930	(Netherlands) Velocitas 1897	8–0	Olympic Stadium, Amsterdam, Netherlands
1942–43	KNVB Cup	Semi-final	20 June 1943	(Netherlands) Wageningen	8–0	Stadion Galgenwaard, Utrecht, Netherlands
1961–62	Eredivisie	Round 19	28 January 1962	(Netherlands) DWS/A	8–0	Olympic Stadium, Amsterdam, Netherlands
1966–67	Eredivisie	Round 18	26 December 1966	(Netherlands) USV Elinkwijk	8–0	De Meer Stadion, Amsterdam, Netherlands
1969–70	Eredivisie	Round 33	18 May 1970	(Netherlands) SVV	8–0	De Meer Stadion, Amsterdam, Netherlands
1972–73	Eredivisie	Round 14	25 November 1972	(Netherlands) Excelsior	8–0	De Meer Stadion, Amsterdam, Netherlands
1974–75	KNVB Cup	Second round	24 November 1974	(Netherlands) Helmond Sport	8–0	De Meer Stadion, Amsterdam, Netherlands
1975–76	UEFA Cup	First round	1 October 1975	(Northern Ireland) Glentoran	8–0	Olympic Stadium, Amsterdam, Netherlands
1994–95	Eredivisie	Round 23	22 March 1995	(Netherlands) Sparta Rotterdam	8–0	De Meer Stadion, Amsterdam, Netherlands
2017–18	Eredivisie	Round 12	18 November 2017	(Netherlands) NAC	8–0	Rat Verlegh Stadion, Breda, Netherlands
2018–19	Eredivisie	Round 16	16 December 2018	(Netherlands) De Graafschap	8–0	Johan Cruyff Arena, Amsterdam, Netherlands

=== Largest defeats ===
Listed are the largest defeats of Ajax, with at least five goals conceded.

Season	Competition	Round	Date	Club	Score	Location
1912–13	Eerste Klasse West I	Round 7	16 March 1913	(Netherlands) DFC	1–9	Het Houten Stadion, Amsterdam, Netherlands
1911–12	KNVB Cup	Third round	17 September 1911	(Netherlands) Achilles 1894	7–0	Marsdijk, Assen, Netherlands
1912–13	Eerste Klasse West I	Round 3	16 March 1913	(Netherlands) HVV	7–0	De Diepput, The Hague, Netherlands
1926–27	KNVB Cup	Third round	18 April 1927	(Netherlands) Enschede Boys	7–0	Volkspark Stadion, Enschede, Netherlands
2025–26	KNVB Cup	Round of 16	14 January 2026	(Netherlands) AZ	6–0	AFAS Stadion, Alkmaar, Netherlands
1912–13	Eerste Klasse West I	Round 16	23 February 1913	(Netherlands) DFC	6–0	Stadion Krommedijk, Dordrecht, Netherlands
1913–14	Eerste Klasse West I	Round 6	30 November 1913	(Netherlands) HVV	6–0	De Diepput, The Hague, Netherlands
2023–24	Eredivisie	Round 29	7 April 2024	(Netherlands) Feyenoord	6–0	De Kuip, Rotterdam, Netherlands
1964–65	Eredivisie	Round 13	29 November 1964	(Netherlands) Feijenoord	9–4	De Kuip, Rotterdam, Netherlands
1910–11	KNVB Cup	Semi-final	4 December 1910	(Netherlands) AFC	6–1	Goed Genoeg, Amsterdam, Netherlands
1912–13	Eerste Klasse West I	Round 4	20 October 1912	(Netherlands) VOC	1–6	Het Houten Stadion, Amsterdam, Netherlands
1913–14	Eerste Klasse West	Round 2	19 October 1913	(Netherlands) DFC	6–1	Stadion Krommedijk, Dordrecht, Netherlands
1959–60	Eredivisie (Nacompetitie)	Round 2	6 June 1960	(Netherlands) Feijenoord	1–6	De Meer Stadion, Amsterdam, Netherlands
2022–23	Champions League	Group stage	4 October 2022	(Italy) Napoli	1–6	Johan Cruyff Arena, Amsterdam, Netherlands
1913–14	KNVB Cup	Round of 16	21 September 1913	(Netherlands) VVA	5–0	Jan van Galen, Amsterdam, Netherlands
1913–14	Eerste Klasse West	Round 17	22 March 1914	(Netherlands) Quick 1888	5–0	De Dennen, Nijmegen, Netherlands
1932–33	Eerste Klasse West II	Round 8	13 November 1932	(Netherlands) Stormvogels	5–0	Schoonenberg Stadion, Velsen, Netherlands

=== Biggest European comebacks ===
Listed are the biggest comebacks of Ajax, where Ajax lost the first leg of the match, but then advanced after winning the return leg.

Season	Competition	Round	Opponent	First Leg	Second Leg	Third Match
1968–69	European Cup I	Quarter-finals	(Portugal) Benfica	Ajax 1–3 Benfica	Benfica 1–3 Ajax	Ajax 3–0 Benfica (a.e.t.)
1969–70	Inter-Cities Fairs Cup	Quarter-finals	(East Germany) Carl Zeiss Jena	Carl Zeiss Jena 3–1 Ajax	Ajax 5–1 Carl Zeiss Jena	
2018–19	Champions League	Round of 16	(Spain) Real Madrid	Ajax 1–2 Real Madrid	Real Madrid 1–4 Ajax	
1977–78	European Cup I	First round	(Norway) Lillestrøm	Lillestrøm 2–0 Ajax	Ajax 4–0 Lillestrøm	
1978–79	UEFA Cup	First round	(Spain) Athletic Bilbao	Athletic Bilbao 2–0 Ajax	Ajax 3–0 Athletic Bilbao	
1973–74	UEFA Super Cup	Final	(Italy) Milan	Milan 1–0 Ajax	Ajax 6–0 Milan	
1986–87	European Cup II	Quarter-finals	(Sweden) Malmö FF	Malmö FF 1–0 Ajax	Ajax 3–1 Malmö FF	
1969–70	Inter-Cities Fairs Cup	First round	(Germany) Hannover 96	Hannover 96 2–1 Ajax	Ajax 3–0 Hannover 96	
1969–70	Inter-Cities Fairs Cup	Third round	(Italy) Napoli	Napoli 1–0 Ajax	Ajax 4–0 Napoli (a.e.t.)	
1970–71	European Cup I	Semi-finals	(Spain) Atlético Madrid	Atlético Madrid 1–0 Ajax	Ajax 3–0 Atlético Madrid	
1975–76	UEFA Cup	Second round	(Germany) Hertha BSC	Hertha BSC 1–0 Ajax	Ajax 4–1 Hertha BSC	
1993–94	European Cup II	First round	(Croatia) Hajduk Split	Hajduk Split 1–0 Ajax	Ajax 6–0 Hajduk Split	
1995–96	Champions League	Semi-finals	(Greece) Panathinaikos	Ajax 0–1 Panathinaikos	Panathinaikos 0–3 Ajax	

=== Biggest European eliminations ===
Listed are the biggest eliminations of Ajax, where Ajax suffered the largest defeats on aggregate scores in European tournaments.

Season	Competition	Round	Opponent	First Leg	Second Leg
1981–82	European Cup Winners' Cup	First round	(England) Tottenham Hotspur	Ajax 1–3 Tottenham Hotspur	Tottenham Hotspur 3–0 Ajax
2013–14	Europa League	Round of 32	(Austria) Red Bull Salzburg	Ajax 0–3 Red Bull Salzburg	Red Bull Salzburg 3–1 Ajax
1996–97	Champions League	Semi-finals	(Italy) Juventus	Ajax 1–2 Juventus	Juventus 4–1 Ajax
2010–11	Europa League	Round of 16	(Russia) Spartak Moscow	Ajax 0–1 Spartak Moscow	Spartak Moscow 3–0 Ajax
1957–58	European Cup I	Quarter-finals	(Hungary) Vasas	Ajax 2–2 Vasas	Vasas 4–0 Ajax
1997–98	UEFA Cup	Quarter-finals	(Russia) Spartak Moscow	Ajax 1–3 Spartak Moscow	Spartak Moscow 1–0 Ajax
1980–81	European Cup I	Second round	(Germany) Bayern Munich	Bayern Munich 5–1 Ajax	Ajax 2–1 Bayern Munich
1988–89	UEFA Cup	First round	(Portugal) Sporting CP	Sporting CP 4–2 Ajax	Ajax 1–2 Sporting CP
2023–24	Conference League	Round of 16	(England) Aston Villa	Ajax 0–0 Aston Villa	Aston Villa 4–0 Ajax
1999–2000	UEFA Cup	Third round	(Spain) Mallorca	Ajax 0–1 Mallorca	Mallorca 2–0 Ajax

== Individual records ==
=== All-time top scorers ===
This list consists of Ajax players that have scored 50 or more goals in official competitions for the first team. There are a total of 18 players that have scored 100 goals or more. Dušan Tadić was the last player to reach this landmark. Piet van Reenen is first on the list with 278 goals. Between 1929 and 1938, he was the club top scorer for nine straight seasons, scoring an average of one goal per match.

List of highest scoring players

#	Name	Goals	Matches	Avg.	League Goals	League Matches	League Avg.	Period
1	(Netherlands) Piet van Reenen	278	240*	1.15	273	237	1.15	1928–1943
2	(Netherlands) Johan Cruyff	270	369	0.73	205	275	0.75	1964–1973; 1981–1983
3	(Netherlands) Sjaak Swart	228	603	0.38	175	463	0.38	1956–1973
4	(Netherlands) Henk Groot	211	302	0.68	161	229	0.70	1959–1969
5	(Netherlands) Piet Keizer	189	489	0.39	146	364	0.40	1960–1975
6	(Netherlands) Klaas-Jan Huntelaar	158	257	0.61	121	177	0.68	2006–2009; 2017–2021
7	(Netherlands) Ruud Geels	153	166	0.92	123	132	0.93	1974–1978
8	(Netherlands) Marco van Basten	152	172	0.89	129	133	0.97	1982–1987
9	(Netherlands) Cees Groot	135	152	0.88	100	120	0.83	1959–1964
10	(Finland) Jari Litmanen	133	255	0.52	96	179	0.54	1992–2004
11	(Netherlands) Wim Volkers	126	265*	0.49	129	265	0.49	1923–1936
12	(Netherlands) Dennis Bergkamp	121	239	0.51	103	185	0.56	1986–1993
13	(Netherlands) Rinus Michels	120	257	0.46	123	265	0.46	1946–1958
14	(Uruguay) Luis Suárez	111	159	0.70	81	110	0.74	2007–2011
15	(Netherlands) John Bosman	105	165	0.64	77	125	0.62	1983–1988
16	(Serbia) Dušan Tadić	105	241	0.44	77	161	0.48	2018–2023
17	(Netherlands) Dick Schoenaker	104	348	0.30	86	271	0.32	1976–1985
18	(Sweden) Stefan Pettersson	100	197	0.51	77	151	0.51	1988–1994
19	(Netherlands) Gerrit Fischer	97	240*	0.40	97	240	0.40	1934–1950
20	(Denmark) Søren Lerby	92	269	0.34	66	206	0.32	1976–1983
21	(Netherlands) Davy Klaassen	92	323	0.28	74	225	0.33	2011–2017; 2020–2023
22	(Netherlands) Gé van Dijk	90	328	0.27	89	325	0.27	1943–1957
23	(Netherlands) Klaas Nuninga	88	187	0.47	75	152	0.49	1964–1969
24	(Netherlands) Guus Dräger	80	207	0.39	80	203	0.39	1941–1951
25	(Netherlands) Theo Brokmann Jr.	79	126*	0.63	79	126	0.63	1939–1951
26	(Netherlands) Wim Kieft	78	118	0.66	68	96	0.71	1980–1983
27	(Netherlands) Theo Brokmann	78	175*	0.45	78	175	0.45	1913–1924
28	(Denmark) Frank Arnesen	75	213	0.35	52	159	0.33	1976–1981
29	(Netherlands) Jan van Dort	73	130*	0.56	73	130	0.56	1913–1922
30	(Netherlands) Erwin van Wijngaarden	73	163*	0.45	73	163	0.45	1932–1949
31	(Georgia (country)) Shota Arveladze	72	125	0.58	55	96	0.57	1997–2001
32	(Netherlands) Gerald Vanenburg	72	209	0.34	64	173	0.37	1981–1986
33	(Netherlands) Gerrie Mühren	72	298	0.24	54	219	0.25	1968–1976
34	(Netherlands) Frank Rijkaard	71	337	0.21	58	262	0.22	1980–1995
35	(Netherlands) Dick van Dijk	69	117	0.59	57	84	0.68	1969–1972
36	(Netherlands) Tscheu La Ling	66	223	0.30	54	172	0.31	1975–1982
37	(Netherlands) Henk Mulders	64	136*	0.47	64	136	0.47	1929–1936
38	(Denmark) Lasse Schöne	64	287	0.22	49	201	0.24	2012–2019
39	(Netherlands) Ronald de Boer	64	305	0.21	50	223	0.22	1987–1998
40	(Netherlands) Rafael van der Vaart	63	156	0.40	52	117	0.44	2000–2005
41	(Netherlands) Piet van der Kuil	60	131	0.46	55	124	0.44	1955–1959
42	(Netherlands) Co Prins	60	184	0.33	42	153	0.27	1959–1966
43	(Netherlands) Aron Winter	60	305	0.20	50	238	0.21	1986–2002
44	(Netherlands) Wesley Sneijder	58	180	0.32	43	126	0.34	2002–2007
45	(Netherlands) Loek den Edel	56	108	0.52	55	101	0.54	1954–1959
46	(Netherlands) Patrick Kluivert	52	100	0.52	39	70	0.56	1994–1997
47	(Netherlands) Rinus Bijl	51	71*	0.72	51	71	0.72	1937–1940
48	(Netherlands) Wim Bleijenberg	51	88	0.58	43	78	0.55	1956–1960
49	(Netherlands) Johnny Rep	50	123	0.41	41	97	0.42	1971–1975

- Official competitions: League + Cup + Super Cup + Playoffs + European Competitions + Club World Cup
- *Based on the amount of known competitions played only

List accurate as of 14 October 2021.

=== Ajax top scorers by season ===
The following is a list of players who have finished as the club top scorers for Ajax by season.

Ajax top scorers by season

Season	Name(s)	League goals	Overall goals
1911–12	(Netherlands) Piet van den Broeke	9	15
1912–13	(Netherlands) Jan Grootmeijer	7	10
1913–14	(Netherlands) Piet Prins	4	4
1914–17	No competition (due to World War I)	—	—
1917–18	(Netherlands) Theo Brokmann	20	30
1918–19	(Netherlands) Jan van Dort	29	29
1919–20	(Netherlands) Jan van Dort	7	18
1920–21	(Netherlands) Wim Gupffert	13	28
1921–22	(Netherlands) Jan van Dort	10	21
1922–23	(Netherlands) Wim Addicks	14	22
1923–24	(Netherlands) Theo Brokmann	9	16
1924–25	(Netherlands) Wim Volkers	13	16
1925–26	(Netherlands) Frans Rutte	15	17
1926–27	(Netherlands) Henk Hordijk	19	21
1927–28	(Netherlands) Ger van der Meer	15	20
1928–29	(Netherlands) Wim Volkers	11	18
1929–30	(Netherlands) Piet van Reenen	26	28
1930–31	(Netherlands) Piet van Reenen	23	32
1931–32	(Netherlands) Piet van Reenen	24	39
1932–33	(Netherlands) Piet van Reenen	18	23
1933–34	(Netherlands) Piet van Reenen	20	30
1934–35	(Netherlands) Piet van Reenen	24	24
1935–36	(Netherlands) Piet van Reenen	22	25
1936–37	(Netherlands) Piet van Reenen	25	30
1937–38	(Netherlands) Piet van Reenen	14	16
1938–39	(Netherlands) Rinus Bijl	22	24
1939–40	(Netherlands) Gerrit Fischer	11	17
1940–41	(Netherlands) Rinus Bijl	12	13
1941–42	(Netherlands) Theo Brokmann Jr.	8	13
1942–43	(Netherlands) Theo Brokmann Jr.	10	17
1943–44	(Netherlands) Theo Brokmann Jr.	17	21
1944–45	No competition (due to World War II)	—	—
1945–46	(Netherlands) Guus Dräger	24	30
1946–47	(Netherlands) Gerard Bruins	13	16
1947–48	(Netherlands) Gerard Bruins	14	20
1948–49	(Netherlands) Theo Brokmann Jr.	11	14
1949–50	(Netherlands) Rinus Michels	16	26
1950–51	(Netherlands) Gé van Dijk	7	18
1951–52	(Netherlands) Rinus Michels	15	19
1952–53	(Netherlands) Arend van der Wel	13	22
1953–54	(Netherlands) Rinus Michels	13	27
1954–55	(Netherlands) Piet Burgers	17	21
1955–56	(Netherlands) Piet van der Kuil	17	33
1956–57	(Netherlands) Wim Bleijenberg	16	33
1957–58	(Netherlands) Loek den Edel	16	31
1958–59	(Netherlands) Wim Bleijenberg * / (Netherlands) Piet van der Kuil ^	15 * / ^	30 ^
1959–60	(Netherlands) Henk Groot	38	42
1960–61	(Netherlands) Henk Groot	41	42
1961–62	(Netherlands) Cees Groot	23	27
1962–63	(Netherlands) Cees Groot	18	20
1963–64	(Netherlands) Cees Groot	22	26
1964–65	(Netherlands) Klaas Nuninga	14	29
1965–66	(Netherlands) Johan Cruyff	16	22
1966–67	(Netherlands) Johan Cruyff	33	41
1967–68	(Netherlands) Johan Cruyff	27	32
1968–69	(Netherlands) Johan Cruyff	24	33
1969–70	(Netherlands) Johan Cruyff ^ / (Netherlands) Dick van Dijk *	23 ^ / *	33 ^
1970–71	(Netherlands) Johan Cruyff	21	27
1971–72	(Netherlands) Johan Cruyff	25	33
1972–73	(Netherlands) Johnny Rep	17	18
1973–74	(Netherlands) Johan Neeskens	15	15
1974–75	(Netherlands) Ruud Geels	30	30
1975–76	(Netherlands) Ruud Geels	29	33
1976–77	(Netherlands) Ruud Geels	34	34
1977–78	(Netherlands) Ruud Geels	30	32
1978–79	(England) Ray Clarke	26	29
1979–80	(Netherlands) Dick Schoenaker	13	14
1980–81	(Netherlands) Wim Kieft	17	17
1981–82	(Netherlands) Wim Kieft	32	32
1982–83	(Netherlands) Wim Kieft	19	20
1983–84	(Netherlands) Marco van Basten	28	30
1984–85	(Netherlands) Marco van Basten	22	28
1985–86	(Netherlands) Marco van Basten	37	40
1986–87	(Netherlands) Marco van Basten	31	45
1987–88	(Netherlands) John Bosman	25	36
1988–89	(Netherlands) Dennis Bergkamp ^ / (Sweden) Stefan Pettersson *	13 ^ / *	16 ^ / *
1989–90	(Netherlands) Aron Winter	10	10
1990–91	(Netherlands) Dennis Bergkamp	25	29
1991–92	(Netherlands) Dennis Bergkamp	24	30
1992–93	(Netherlands) Dennis Bergkamp	26	33
1993–94	(Finland) Jari Litmanen	26	34
1994–95	(Netherlands) Patrick Kluivert	18	21
1995–96	(Netherlands) Patrick Kluivert	15	21
1996–97	(Netherlands) Patrick Kluivert ^ / (Finland) Jari Litmanen *	6 ^ / *	8 ^ / *
1997–98	(Georgia (country)) Shota Arveladze	25	37
1998–99	(Finland) Jari Litmanen ^ / (South Africa) Benni McCarthy *	11 ^ / *	13 ^
1999–00	(Netherlands) Richard Knopper	15	18
2000–01	(Georgia (country)) Shota Arveladze	18	20
2001–02	(Netherlands) Rafael van der Vaart	14	17
2002–03	(Netherlands) Rafael van der Vaart	18	22
2003–04	(Sweden) Zlatan Ibrahimović	13	15
2004–05	(Netherlands) Ryan Babel ^ / (Netherlands) Wesley Sneijder *	7 ^ / *	9 ^
2005–06	(Netherlands) Klaas-Jan Huntelaar	16	22
2006–07	(Netherlands) Klaas-Jan Huntelaar	21	35
2007–08	(Netherlands) Klaas-Jan Huntelaar	33	36
2008–09	(Uruguay) Luis Suárez	22	28
2009–10	(Uruguay) Luis Suárez	35	49
2010–11	(Morocco) Mounir El Hamdaoui	13	19
2011–12	(Netherlands) Siem de Jong	13	17
2012–13	(Netherlands) Siem de Jong	12	16
2013–14	(Netherlands) Davy Klaassen ^ / (Denmark) Lasse Schöne ʰ / (Iceland) Kolbeinn Sigþórsson *	10 ^ / *	13 ʰ
2014–15	(Poland) Arkadiusz Milik	11	23
2015–16	(Poland) Arkadiusz Milik	21	27
2016–17	(Denmark) Kasper Dolberg	16	22
2017–18	(Brazil) David Neres	14	14
2018–19	(Serbia) Dušan Tadić	28	38
2019–20	(Netherlands) Quincy Promes ^ / (Serbia) Dušan Tadić *	12 ^	16 ^ / *
2020–21	(Serbia) Dušan Tadić	14	22
2021–22	(Ivory Coast) Sébastien Haller	21	34
2022–23	(Netherlands) Brian Brobbey * / (Ghana) Mohammed Kudus ^	13 *	18 ^
2023–24	(Netherlands) Brian Brobbey	18	22
2024–25	(Netherlands) Kenneth Taylor ^ / (Netherlands) Wout Weghorst *	10 *	15 ^
2025–26	(Belgium) Mika Godts	17	17

- In the 1958–59 season, Wim Bleijenberg and Piet van der Kuil tied as the club's leading scorers in league matches with 15 goals, while Piet van der Kuil led the club with 30 goals scored overall.
- In the 1969–70 season, Johan Cruyff and Dick van Dijk tied as the club's leading scorers in league matches with 23 goals, while Johan Cruyff led the club with 33 goals scored overall.
- In the 1988–89 season, Dennis Bergkamp and Stefan Pettersson tied as the club's leading scorers in league matches with 13 goals, and overall with 16 goals scored.
- In the 1996–97 season, Patrick Kluivert and Jari Litmanen tied as the club's leading scorers in league matches with 6 goals, and overall with 8 goals scored.
- In the 1998–99 season, Jari Litmanen and Benni McCarthy tied as the club's leading scorers in league matches with 11 goals, while Jari Litmanen led the club with 13 scored overall.
- In the 2004–05 season, Ryan Babel and Wesley Sneijder tied as the club's leading scorers in league matches with 7 goals, while Ryan Babel led the club with 9 goals scored overall.
- In the 2013–14 season, Davy Klaassen and Kolbeinn Sigþórsson tied as the club's leading scorers in league matches with 10 goals, while Lasse Schöne led the club with 13 goals scored overall.
- In the 2019–20 season, Quincy Promes and Dušan Tadić tied as the club's leading scorers overall with 16 goals, while Quincy Promes led the club in league goals scored with 12.
- In the 2022–23 season, Mohammed Kudus was the club's leading scorer overall with 18 goals, while Brian Brobbey led the club in league goals scored with 13.
- In the 2024–25 season, Kenneth Taylor was the club's leading scorer overall with 15 goals, while Wout Weghorst led the club in league goals scored with 10.

=== Jong Ajax top scorers by season ===
The following is a list of players who have finished as top scorers of the reserves' team Jong Ajax by season.

Jong Ajax top scorers by Eerste Divisie season

Season	Name(s)	League goals
2013–14	(Serbia) Dejan Meleg	12
2014–15	(Curaçao) Richairo Živković	16
2015–16	(Netherlands) Sam Hendriks	14
2016–17	(Czech Republic) Václav Černý	15
2017–18	(Colombia) Mateo Cassierra	18
2018–19	(Brazil) Danilo	19
2019–20	(Burkina Faso) Lassina Traoré	13
2020–21	(Netherlands) Brian Brobbey	9
2021–22	(Turkey) Naci Ünüvar	16
2022–23	(Iceland) Kristian Hlynsson	10
2023–24	(Netherlands) Jaydon Banel / (Netherlands) Gabriel Misehouy	7
2024–25	(Netherlands) Julian Rijkhoff	9
2025–26	(Netherlands) Don O'Niel	8

=== 40 goals in one season ===
The following is a list of players who have scored 40 or more goals for Ajax in a single season.

40+ goals in one season

#	Season	Name	Matches	Goals
1	1960–61	(Netherlands) Henk Groot	46	64
2	2009–10	(Uruguay) Luis Suárez	48	49
3	1986–87	(Netherlands) Marco van Basten	43	44
4	1966–67	(Netherlands) Johan Cruyff	41	41

=== Youngest team fielded in Eredivisie history ===
On 14 May 2017, manager Peter Bosz fielded the youngest team in Eredivisie history, with an average age of 20 years and 139 days, when they played Willem II on the final match day of the 2016–17 Eredivisie season. At the age of 24, Davy Klaassen was the oldest on the pitch and was joined by two players aged 21, five aged 20, a 19-year-old, 18-year-old and a 17-year-old.

14 May 2017 (Willem II vs. Ajax)
Starting Lineup

The Youngest team Lineup:

- (Cameroon) André Onana (GK)
- (Netherlands) Kenny Tete (RB)
- (Colombia) Davinson Sánchez (CB)
- (Netherlands) Matthijs de Ligt (CB)
- (Netherlands) Jaïro Riedewald (LB)
- (Netherlands) Davy Klaassen (CM)
- (Netherlands) Donny van de Beek (CM)
- (Netherlands) Frenkie de Jong (CM)
- (Brazil) David Neres (RW)
- (Denmark) Kasper Dolberg (ST)
- (Netherlands) Justin Kluivert (LW)
- (Netherlands) Peter Bosz (Manager)

=== Youngest players to make league debut ===
The following is a list of the youngest Ajax players to debut for the club in Eredivisie history.

Youngest players to debut for Ajax

#	Name	Age	Date	Opponent	Final score
1	(Netherlands) Ryan Gravenberch	16 years, 130 days	23 September 2018	PSV	3–0 loss
2	(Netherlands) Clarence Seedorf	16 years, 241 days	28 November 1992	Groningen	0–3 win
3	(Netherlands) Jorrel Hato	16 years, 335 days	5 February 2023	Cambuur	0–5 win
4	(Netherlands) Vurnon Anita	16 years, 349 days	19 March 2006	Groningen	3–2 loss
5	(Netherlands) Richard Sneekes	16 years, 362 days	27 October 1985	HFC Haarlem	5–1 win
6	(Netherlands) Bert Strijks	17 years, 9 days	13 May 1962	Rapid JC	2–2 draw
7	(Netherlands) Gerald Vanenburg	17 years, 31 days	5 April 1981	FC Den Haag	2–0 win
8	(Netherlands) Richard Witschge	17 years, 36 days	26 October 1986	AZ	1–6 win
9	(Netherlands) Ryan Babel	17 years, 44 days	1 February 2004	ADO Den Haag	4–0 win
10	(Netherlands) Rafael van der Vaart	17 years, 68 days	19 April 2000	Den Bosch	1–1 draw

=== Players to score on their league debut ===
The following is a list of the youngest Ajax players to score on their debut in Eredivisie history.

Youngest to score on their debut

#	Name	Age	Date	Opponent	Goals	Final score
1	(Netherlands) Jaïro Riedewald	17 years, 104 days	22 December 2013	Roda JC	2	1–2 win
2	(Netherlands) Marco van Basten	17 years, 154 days	3 April 1982	NEC	1	5–0 win
3	(Netherlands) Ronald de Boer	17 years, 190 days	21 November 1987	PEC Zwolle '82	1	6–4 win
4	(Netherlands) Johan Cruyff	17 years, 204 days	15 November 1964	GVAV	1	3–1 loss
5	(Netherlands) Bryan Roy	17 years, 206 days	6 September 1987	Twente	1	6–1 win
6	(Netherlands) Marciano Vink	17 years, 319 days	31 August 1988	Sparta Rotterdam	1	2–1 win
7	(Netherlands) Frank Rijkaard	17 years, 328 days	23 August 1980	Go Ahead Eagles	1	2–4 win
8	(Netherlands) Nordin Wooter	18 years, 4 days	28 August 1994	RKC Waalwijk	1	3–1 win
9	(Netherlands) Patrick Kluivert	18 years, 58 days	28 August 1994	RKC Waalwijk	1	3–1 win
10	(Netherlands) Bob Westra	18 years, 146 days	15 March 1959	VVV	1	3–0 win
11	(Netherlands) Edwin Bakker	18 years, 149 days	30 January 1983	HFC Haarlem	1	6–1 win
12	(Netherlands) Edwin Godee	18 years, 223 days	7 May 1983	Helmond Sport	1	1–4 win
13	(Netherlands) Siem de Jong	18 years, 252 days	7 October 2007	Sparta Rotterdam	1	2–2 draw
14	(Netherlands) Brian Brobbey	18 years, 272 days	31 October 2020	Fortuna Sittard	1	5–2 win
15	(Netherlands) Davy Klaassen	18 years, 279 days	27 November 2011	NEC	1	0–3 win
16	(Netherlands) John Bosman	18 years, 292 days	20 November 1983	Roda JC	1	5–2 win
17	(Netherlands) Donald Feldmann	18 years, 344 days	10 November 1957	NAC	1	3–1 win
18	(Netherlands) Aron Winter	19 years, 36 days	6 April 1986	Utrecht	1	3–0 win
19	(Denmark) Jan Mølby	19 years, 49 days	22 August 1982	Go Ahead Eagles	1	4–1 win
20	(Netherlands) Ricardo Kishna	19 years, 50 days	23 February 1982	AZ	1	4–0 win
21	(Netherlands) Tarik Oulida	19 years, 75 days	4 April 1993	Den Bosch	1	4–0 win
22	(Suriname) Clyde Wijnhard	19 years, 84 days	24 January 1993	Dordrecht '90	1	4–1 win
23	(Netherlands) Rob Rijnink	19 years, 172 days	23 March 1985	Fortuna Sittard	1	0–2 win
24	(Serbia) Miralem Sulejmani	19 years, 269 days	30 August 2008	Willem II	1	2–1 loss
25	(Brazil) Antony	20 years, 164 days	13 September 2020	Sparta Rotterdam	1	0–1 win
26	(Uruguay) Luis Suárez	20 years, 207 days	19 August 2007	De Graafschap	1	1–8 win
27	(Netherlands) Rob de Wit	20 years, 207 days	19 August 2007	Sparta Rotterdam	1	2–5 win
28	(Netherlands) Edo Ophof	21 years, 123 days	18 October 1980	AZ '67	1	1–2 loss
29	(Netherlands) Arie Haan	21 years, 189 days	24 May 1970	ADO Den Haag	1	1–1 draw
30	(Netherlands) Danny Hoesen	21 years, 307 days	17 November 2012	VVV-Venlo	1	1–1 draw
31	(Netherlands) Arnold van Haren	22 years, 86 days	12 December 1965	Willem II	1	1–4 win
32	(Denmark) Ole Tobiasen	22 years, 115 days	31 August 1997	Utrecht	2	1–7 win
33	(Netherlands) Loek den Edel	22 years, 276 days	2 September 1956	NAC	1	1–0 win
34	(Sweden) Markus Rosenberg	22 years, 327 days	20 August 2005	RBC Roosendaal	1	0–2 win
35	(Nigeria) Sunday Oliseh	22 years, 339 days	19 August 1997	Vitesse	1	5–0 win
36	(Netherlands) Martin Wiggemansen	23 years, 81 days	27 August 1980	Roda JC	1	5–0 win
37	(Netherlands) Dick van Dijk	23 years, 176 days	10 August 1969	GVAV	1	1–3 win
38	(Hungary) Pál Fischer	23 years, 196 days	13 August 1989	FC Den Haag	1	0–4 win
39	(Netherlands) Piet Ouderland	23 years, 239 days	11 November 1956	Feijenoord	1	7–3 loss
40	(Georgia (country)) Shota Arveladze	24 years, 178 days	19 August 1997	Vitesse	1	5–0 win
41	(Netherlands) Derk Boerrigter	24 years, 295 days	7 August 1997	De Graafschap	1	1–4 win
42	(Croatia) Jakov Medić	24 years, 339 days	12 August 2023	Heracles Almelo	1	4–1 win
43	(Netherlands) Nick Viergever	25 years, 7 days	10 August 2014	Vitesse	1	4–1 win
44	(Netherlands) Jan Snoeks	25 years, 147 days	25 August 1957	MVV	1	4–0 win
45	(Sweden) Stefan Pettersson	25 years, 152 days	25 August 1957	Fortuna Sittard	1	2–1 loss
46	(England) Ray Clarke	25 years, 335 days	26 August 1978	NAC	1	1–7 win
47	(Morocco) Mounir El Hamdaoui	26 years, 25 days	8 August 2010	Groningen	2	2–2 draw
48	(Greece) Nikos Machlas	26 years, 60 days	15 August 1999	Heerenveen	1	3–2 win
49	(Netherlands) John van Loen	26 years, 198 days	21 August 1991	Volendam	1	3–0 win
50	(Sweden) Inge Danielsson	26 years, 277 days	17 March 1968	PSV	1	4–0 win
51	(Sweden) Kennedy Bakircioglu	26 years, 290 days	19 August 2007	De Graafschap	1	1–8 win
52	(Finland) Niklas Moisander	26 years, 331 days	25 August 2012	De Graafschap	1	5–0 win
53	(Netherlands) Willy Brokamp	28 years, 195 days	8 September 1978	NAC	1	1–4 win
54	(Denmark) Henning Jensen	30 years, 2 days	19 August 1979	Willem II	2	1–3 win
55	(Netherlands) Theo Janssen	30 years, 11 days	7 August 2011	De Graafschap	1	1–4 win
56	(Denmark) Brian Laudrup	30 years, 174 days	15 August 1999	Heerenveen	1	3–2 win
57	(Russia) Dmitri Bulykin	31 years, 302 days	18 September 2011	PSV	1	2–2 win
58	(Poland) Andrzej Rudy	31 years, 308 days	19 August 1997	Vitesse	1	5–0 win

=== Youngest players to score a league goal ===
The following is a list of the youngest Ajax players to score a goal in Eredivisie history. The list also includes how many matches were played prior to scoring.

Youngest to score a goal

#	Name	Age	Date	Opponent	Goals	Final score	Matches played
1	(Netherlands) Clarence Seedorf	16 years, 361 days	28 March 1993	Vitesse	1	2–2 draw	9
2	(Netherlands) Gerald Vanenburg	17 years, 66 days	10 May 1981	MVV	2	6–1 win	6
3	(Netherlands) Jaïro Riedewald	17 years, 104 days	22 December 2013	Roda JC	2	1–2 win	1
4	(Netherlands) Marco van Basten	17 years, 154 days	3 April 1983	NEC	1	5–0 win	1
5	(Netherlands) Ronald de Boer	17 years, 190 days	21 November 1987	PEC Zwolle '82	1	6–4 win	1
6	(Netherlands) Johan Cruyff	17 years, 190 days	15 November 1964	GVAV	1	3–1 loss	1
7	(Netherlands) Bryan Roy	17 years, 206 days	6 September 1987	FC Twente	1	6–1 win	1
8	(Nigeria) Nwankwo Kanu	17 years, 238 days	27 March 1994	Feyenoord	1	2–1 loss	2
9	(Netherlands) Piet Keizer	17 years, 250 days	19 February 1961	PSV	1	1–3 win	2
10	(Netherlands) Rafael van der Vaart	17 years, 252 days	20 October 2000	Roda JC	1	4–2 win	5
11	(Netherlands) Jorrel Hato	17 years, 264 days	26 November 2023	Vitesse	1	5–0 win	22
12	(Netherlands) Wim Kieft	17 years, 285 days	23 August 1980	Go Ahead Eagles	2	2–4 win	2
13	(Netherlands) Dennis Bergkamp	17 years, 288 days	22 February 1987	HFC Haarlem	1	6–0 win	2
14	(Netherlands) Marciano Vink	17 years, 319 days	31 August 1988	Sparta Rotterdam	1	2–1 win	1
15	(Netherlands) Frank Rijkaard	17 years, 328 days	23 August 1980	Go Ahead Eagles	1	2–4 win	1
16	(Netherlands) Ryan Babel	17 years, 337 days	20 November 2004	De Graafschap	1	0–5 win	2
17	(Netherlands) Sonny Silooy	17 years, 364 days	30 August 1981	De Graafschap	1	9–1 win	2
18	(Netherlands) Nordin Wooter	18 years, 4 days	28 August 1994	RKC Waalwijk	1	3–1 win	1
19	(Netherlands) Richard Witschge	18 years, 28 days	18 October 1987	FC Volendam	1	2–1 win	4
20	(Netherlands) Patrick Kluivert	18 years, 58 days	28 August 1994	RKC Waalwijk	1	3–1 win	1
21	(Denmark) Søren Lerby	18 years, 78 days	19 April 1976	NAC	1	5–0 win	3
22	(Netherlands) Ruud Kaiser	18 years, 102 days	7 April 1979	MVV	1	6–0 win	3
23	(Netherlands) Bob Westra	18 years, 146 days	15 March 1959	VVV	1	3–0 win	1
24	(Netherlands) Edwin Bakker	18 years, 149 days	30 January 1983	HFC Haarlem	1	6–1 win	1
25	(Denmark) Viktor Fischer	18 years, 155 days	11 November 2012	PEC Zwolle	2	2–4 win	3
26	(Belgium) Tom De Mul	18 years, 164 days	15 August 2004	Twente	1	2–3 win	3
27	(Romania) Nicolae Mitea	18 years, 195 days	5 October 2003	Groningen	1	1–3 win	2
28	(Denmark) Christian Eriksen	18 years, 196 days	29 August 2010	De Graafschap	1	0–5 win	19
29	(Egypt) Mido	18 years, 212 days	23 September 2001	Sparta Rotterdam	2	3–0 win	4
30	(Netherlands) Edwin Godee	18 years, 223 days	7 May 1983	Helmond Sport	1	1–4 win	1
31	(Netherlands) Edgar Davids	18 years, 231 days	30 October 1991	Willem II	1	3–0 win	3
32	(Netherlands) Kiki Musampa	18 years, 234 days	10 March 1996	Twente	1	6–1 win	12
33	(Netherlands) Siem de Jong	18 years, 252 days	7 October 2007	Sparta Rotterdam	1	2–2 draw	1
34	(Netherlands) Brian Brobbey	18 years, 272 days	31 October 2020	Fortuna Sittard	1	5–2 win	1
35	(Netherlands) Davy Klaassen	18 years, 279 days	27 November 2011	NEC	1	0–3 win	1
36	(Netherlands) John Bosman	18 years, 292 days	20 November 1983	Roda JC	1	2–1 win	1
37	(Netherlands) Wesley Sneijder	18 years, 308 days	13 April 2003	NAC	1	0–3 win	10
38	(Netherlands) Nigel de Jong	18 years, 336 days	1 November 2003	AZ	1	3–2 win	25
39	(Netherlands) Donald Feldmann	18 years, 344 days	10 November 1957	NAC	1	3–1 win	1
40	(Netherlands) Jody Lukoki	18 years, 348 days	29 October 2011	Roda JC	1	0–4 win	4
41	(Netherlands) Martin van Geel	19 years, 5 days	2 December 1979	FC Den Haag	1	3–0 win	5
42	(Netherlands) Ton Blanker	19 years, 22 days	7 October 1979	Roda JC	1	4–0 win	5
43	(Netherlands) Aron Winter	19 years, 36 days	6 April 1986	Roda JC	1	4–0 win	1
44	(Denmark) Jan Mølby	19 years, 49 days	22 August 1982	Go Ahead Eagles	1	4–1 win	1
45	(Netherlands) Ricardo Kishna	19 years, 50 days	23 February 2014	AZ	1	4–0 win	1
46	(Netherlands) Sjaak Swart	19 years, 60 days	1 September 1957	Enschede	1	0–3 win	7
47	(Netherlands) Tarik Oulida	19 years, 75 days	4 April 1993	Den Bosch	1	4–0 win	1
48	(Suriname) Clyde Wijnhard	19 years, 84 days	24 January 1993	Dordrecht '90	1	4–1 win	1
49	(Netherlands) Arno Splinter	19 years, 101 days	24 January 1993	AZ	1	1–1 draw	3
50	(Netherlands) Anwar El Ghazi	19 years, 107 days	17 August 2014	AZ	1	1–3 win	2
51	(Netherlands) Dennis Schulp	19 years, 109 days	7 May 1997	Groningen	1	1–1 draw	3
52	(Netherlands) Lorenzo Ebecilio	19 years, 163 days	6 March 2011	AZ	1	4–0 win	9

=== Top 5 youngest to score a league own goal ===
The following is a list of the top five youngest Ajax players to score an own goal in Eredivisie history.

Top 5 youngest to score an own goal

#	Name	Age	Date	Opponent
1	(Netherlands) Fabian Sporkslede	19 years, 65 days	7 October 2012	Utrecht
2	(Germany) Werner Schaaphok	19 years, 115 days	16 April 1961	ADO Den Haag
3	(Netherlands) Marciano Vink	19 years, 124 days	11 March 1989	RKC Waalwijk
4	(Netherlands) Frank Rijkaard	19 years, 136 days	13 February 1982	PEC Zwolle
5	(Denmark) Jan Mølby	19 years, 140 days	20 November 1982	Utrecht

=== Top 10 most assists in the Eredivisie of all time ===
The following is a list of the top ten Ajax players for most assists in Eredivisie history.

Top 10 most league assists of all-time

#	Overall ranking	Name	Assists	Matches played
1	1	(Serbia) Dušan Tadić	112	249
2	2	(Netherlands) Piet Keizer	101	363
3	3	(Netherlands) Sjaak Swart	96	460
4	4	(Morocco) Hakim Ziyech	87	216
5	5	(Netherlands) Johan Cruyff	87	308
6	7	(Denmark) Kenneth Pérez	69	325
7	8	(Denmark) Dennis Rommedahl	68	269
8	9	(Netherlands) Steven Berghuis	67	264
9	10	(Denmark) Lasse Schöne	67	376
10	12	(Uruguay) Luis Suárez	60	139

- The amount of assists are a total of all assists given in league history from all league appearances and not solely while playing for Ajax

=== Highest scoring in the National Cup ===
The following is a list of the players who have scored the most goals for Ajax in the KNVB Cup, with at least five goals scored.

Most goals scored for Ajax in the KNVB Cup:

#	Name	Goals
1	(Netherlands) Johan Cruyff	35
2	(Netherlands) Henk Groot	19
2	(Netherlands) Sjaak Swart	19
4	(Netherlands) Siem de Jong	17
5	(Netherlands) John Bosman	16
5	(Netherlands) Piet Keizer	16
5	(Netherlands) Dick Schoenaker	16
8	(Denmark) Frank Arnesen	15
9	(Netherlands) Klaas-Jan Huntelaar	14
10	(Netherlands) Marco van Basten	12
10	(Uruguay) Luis Suárez	12
12	(Netherlands) Ruud Geels	11
12	(Netherlands) Cees Groot	11
12	(Sweden) Stefan Pettersson	11
15	(Netherlands) Wim Kieft	10
15	(Denmark) Søren Lerby	10
15	(Netherlands) Co Prins	10
18	(Netherlands) Dennis Bergkamp	9
19	(Suriname) Dean Gorré	8
19	(Finland) Jari Litmanen	8
19	(Poland) Arkadiusz Milik	8
22	(Netherlands) Ronald de Boer	7
22	(Netherlands) Theo Brokmann	7
22	(Netherlands) Edgar Davids	7
22	(Netherlands) Dick van Dijk	7
22	(Denmark) Viktor Fischer	7
22	(Netherlands) Jan-Willem Lucas	7
22	(Netherlands) Frank Rijkaard	7
22	(Serbia) Dušan Tadić	7
22	(Brazil) Wamberto	7
30	(Georgia (country)) Shota Arveladze	6
30	(Brazil) Danilo	6
30	(Morocco) Zakaria Labyad	6
30	(Netherlands) Tschen La Ling	6
30	(Netherlands) Klaas Nuninga	6
30	(Netherlands) Gerald Vanenburg	6
35	(Netherlands) Ryan Babel	5
35	(Netherlands) Frank de Boer	5
35	(England) Ray Clarke	5
35	(Austria) Felix Gasselich	5
35	(Netherlands) Ronald Koeman	5
35	(Netherlands) Gerrie Mühren	5
35	(Denmark) Dan Petersen	5
35	(Denmark) Lasse Schöne	5
35	(Netherlands) Jan Seelen	5
35	(Netherlands) Wesley Sneijder	5
35	(Netherlands) Demy de Zeeuw	5

==== Most goals in a single cup match ====
The following is a list of the players who have scored the most goals for Ajax in a single KNVB Cup match, with at least three goals scored.

Most goals scored in a single KNVB Cup match:

#	Season	Name	Opponent	Goals
1	2014–15	(Poland) Arkadiusz Milik	JOS Watergraafsmeer	6
1	2009–10	(Uruguay) Luis Suárez	WHC	6
3	2021–22	(Brazil) Danilo	Excelsior Maassluis	4
3	1997–98	(Suriname) Dean Gorré	MVV	4
3	1977–78	(Netherlands) Ruud Geels	EVV	4
3	1965–66	(Netherlands) Johan Cruyff	Veendam	4
7	2019–20	(Netherlands) Siem de Jong	Spakenburg	3
7	2017–18	(Denmark) Kasper Dolberg	Scheveningen	3
7	1997–98	(Finland) Jari Litmanen	PSV	3
7	1992–93	(Netherlands) Edgar Davids	Feyenoord	3
7	1988–89	(Netherlands) Aron Winter	SVV	3
7	1987–88	(Netherlands) John Bosman	Quick Boys	3
7	1983–84	(Austria) Felix Gasselich	HOV	3
7	1982–83	(Netherlands) Dick Schoenaker	Roda JC	3
7	1980–81	(Netherlands) Wim Kieft	Twente	3
7	1980–81	(Netherlands) Wim Kieft	SVV	3
7	1974–75	(Netherlands) Ruud Geels	Helmond Sport	3
7	1960–61	(Netherlands) Henk Groot	Cambuur	3
7	1960–61	(Netherlands) Henk Groot	NAC	3
7	1960–61	(Netherlands) Co Prins	Zeist	3
7	1960–61	(Netherlands) Co Prins	Rapidistas	3
7	1958–59	(Netherlands) Jan Seelen	JOS	3
7	1942–43	(Netherlands) Gerrit Fischer	Wageningen	3
7	1916–17	(Netherlands) Theo Brokmann	Tubantia	3
7	1916–17	(Netherlands) Jan Schäfer	Hengelo	3

==== KNVB Cup top scorers ====
The following is a list of players who finished as top scorers of the KNVB Cup.

Ajax players who finished as KNVB Cup top scorers

Season	Name	Goals
1986–87	(Netherlands) Marco van Basten	7
1993–94	(Sweden) Stefan Pettersson	4
2009–10	(Netherlands) Klaas-Jan Huntelaar	6
2009–10	(Uruguay) Luis Suárez	9
2014–15	(Poland) Arkadiusz Milik	8
2021–22	(Brazil) Danilo	6

=== Highest scoring in the Champions League ===
The following is a list of the players who have scored the most goals for Ajax in the Champions League (not including qualifying rounds), with at least four goals scored.

Most goals scored for Ajax in the Champions League:

#	Name	Goals
1	(Finland) Jari Litmanen	20
2	(Ivory Coast) Sébastien Haller	11
3	(Netherlands) Patrick Kluivert	9
3	(Serbia) Dušan Tadić	9
5	(Sweden) Zlatan Ibrahimović	6
6	(Netherlands) Donny van de Beek	5
6	(Netherlands) Nigel de Jong	5
6	(Belgium) Wesley Sonck	5
6	(Morocco) Hakim Ziyech	5
10	(Netherlands) Ronald de Boer	4
10	(Netherlands) Klaas-Jan Huntelaar	4
10	(Netherlands) Siem de Jong	4
10	(Netherlands) Rafael van der Vaart	4

=== Highest scoring in Europe (all competitions) ===
The following is a list of the players who have scored the most goals for Ajax in the Champions League, Europa League, UEFA Super Cup.

As of 10 November 2023

Rank	Goals	Player	Last score	Tournament
1	26	(Finland) Jari Litmanen	23 Apr 2003	2002–03 Champions League
2	25	(Netherlands) Johan Cruyff	7 Mar 1973	1972–73 European Cup
3	19	(Serbia) Dušan Tadić	23 Feb 2022	2021–22 Champions League
4	17	(Netherlands) Klaas-Jan Huntelaar	6 Aug 2019	2019–20 Champions League
4	17	(Netherlands) Sjaak Swart	8 Nov 1972	1972–73 European Cup
6	16	(Netherlands) Davy Klaassen	12 Oct 2022	2022–23 Champions League
6	16	(Uruguay) Luis Suárez	25 Aug 2010	2010–11 Champions League
6	16	(Denmark) Søren Lerby	15 Sep 1982	1982–83 European Cup
9	14	(Netherlands) Piet Keizer	21 Mar 1973	1973–74 European Cup
9	14	(Netherlands) Ruud Geels	28 Sep 1977	1977–78 European Cup
11	12	(Netherlands) Gerrie Mühren	1 Oct 1975	1975–76 UEFA Cup
11	12	(Netherlands) John Bosman	9 Mar 1988	1987–88 European Cup Winners' Cup
11	12	(Sweden) Stefan Pettersson	3 Nov 1993	1993–94 European Cup Winners' Cup
14	11	(Ivory Coast) Sébastien Haller	7 Dec 2021	2021–22 Champions League
15	10	(Netherlands) Dennis Bergkamp	4 Nov 1992	1992–93 UEFA Cup
15	10	(Morocco) Hakim Ziyech	27 Nov 2019	2019–20 Champions League
15	10	(Denmark) Lasse Schöne	13 Feb 2019	2018–19 Champions League
15	10	(Georgia (country)) Shota Arveladze	9 Nov 2000	2000–01 UEFA Cup
19	9	(Netherlands) Donny van de Beek	5 Nov 2019	2019–20 Champions League
19	9	(Netherlands) Patrick Kluivert	5 Mar 1997	1996–97 Champions League
19	9	(Sweden) Zlatan Ibrahimović	22 Oct 2003	2003–04 Champions League

=== Players with most appearances ===
The following is a list of the top 10 players who have played the most matches for Ajax.

List of players with most matches played

#	Name	Matches	Goals	Period
1	(Netherlands) Sjaak Swart	603	228	1956–1973
2	(Netherlands) Wim Suurbier	509	19	1964–1977
3	(Netherlands) Danny Blind	493	36	1986–1999
4	(Netherlands) Piet Keizer	489	189	1961–1974
5	(Netherlands) Ruud Krol	457	30	1968–1980
6	(Netherlands) Frank de Boer	434	43	1988–1998
7	(Netherlands) Bennie Muller	425	37	1958–1970
8	(Netherlands) Barry Hulshoff	386	24	1965–1977
9	(Netherlands) Johan Cruyff	369	270	1964–1983
10	(Netherlands) Piet Schrijvers	356	0	1974–1983

=== Most successful managers ===
The following is a list of the Ajax managers who have won the most Eredivisie titles at the helm of Ajax.

Managers who have won the most national titles for Ajax

#	Name	Titles won	Seasons
1	(England) Jack Reynolds	8	1917–18, 1918–19, 1930–31, 1931–32, 1933–34, 1936–37, 1937–38, 1946–47
2	(Netherlands) Rinus Michels	4	1965–66, 1966–67, 1967–68, 1969–70
2	(Netherlands) Frank de Boer	4	2010–11, 2011–12, 2012–13, 2013–14
4	(Netherlands) Louis van Gaal	3	1993–94, 1994–95, 1995–96
4	(Netherlands) Erik ten Hag	3	2018–19, 2020–21, 2021–22
6	(Hungary) Ștefan Kovács	2	1971–72, 1972–73
6	(Netherlands) Leo Beenhakker	2	1979–80, 1989–90
6	(Netherlands) Ronald Koeman	2	2001–02, 2003–04
9	(Austria) Karl Humenberger	1	1956–57
9	(England) Vic Buckingham	1	1959–60
9	(Socialist Federal Republic of Yugoslavia) Tomislav Ivić	1	1976–77
9	(Netherlands) Cor Brom	1	1978–79
9	(Germany) Kurt Linder	1	1981–82
9	(Netherlands) Aad de Mos	1	1982–83
9	Driemanschap*	1	1984–85
9	(Denmark) Morten Olsen	1	1997–98

- In May 1985, the Driemanschap (English: Three man team) Tonny Bruins Slot, Spitz Kohn and Cor van der Hart succeeded Aad de Mos as Interim managers.

=== Managers with consecutive titles ===
The following is a list of the Ajax managers who have won the most consecutive Eredivisie titles at the helm of Ajax.

Managers who have won the most consecutive national titles for Ajax

#	Name	Titles won	Years
1	(Netherlands) Frank de Boer	4	2011–2014
2	(Netherlands) Rinus Michels	3	1966–1968
2	(Netherlands) Louis van Gaal	3	1994–1996
2	(Netherlands) Erik ten Hag*	3	2019–2022
5	(Hungary) Ștefan Kovács	2	1972–1973

- The 2019–20 Eredivisie season was cancelled due to the COVID-19 pandemic in the Netherlands. Although Ajax were in first place, no title was awarded, resulting in Erik ten Hag having won three consecutive titles with one gap of a season.

=== Top 25 most expensive transfers ===
The following is a list of the top 25 most expensive transfers in the club's history for both the club acquisitions and departures.

Top 25 most expensive player acquisitions

#	Player	Position	Age	Previous club	Season	Transfer fee
1	(Netherlands) Steven Bergwijn	Winger	24	(England) Tottenham Hotspur	2022–23	€31.25 million
2	(Croatia) Josip Šutalo	Center back	23	(Croatia) Dinamo Zagreb	2023–24	€23.5 million
3	(Ivory Coast) Sébastien Haller	Striker	26	(England) West Ham United	2020–21	€22.5 million
4	(Nigeria) Calvin Bassey	Center back	22	(Scotland) Rangers	2022–23	€22 million
5	(Brazil) David Neres	Winger	19	(Brazil) São Paulo	2017–18	€17.4 million
6	(Netherlands) Brian Brobbey	Striker	20	(Germany) RB Leipzig	2022–23	€17 million
7	(Serbia) Miralem Sulejmani	Winger	19	(Netherlands) Heerenveen	2008–09	€16.25 million
8	(Netherlands) Daley Blind	Left back	28	(England) Manchester United	2018–19	€16 million
9	(Georgia (country)) Georges Mikautadze	Striker	22	(France) Metz	2023–24	€16 million
10	(Brazil) Antony	Winger	19	(Brazil) São Paulo	2020–21	€15.75 million
11	(Netherlands) Quincy Promes	Winger	27	(Spain) Sevilla	2019–20	€15.7 million
12	(Mexico) Edson Álvarez	Center back	21	(Mexico) América	2019–20	€15 million
13	(Portugal) Carlos Forbs	Winger	19	(England) Manchester City	2023–24	€14 million
14	(Serbia) Dušan Tadić	Winger	28	(England) Southampton	2018–19	€13.7 million
15	(Romania) Răzvan Marin	Midfielder	22	(Belgium) Standard Liège	2019–20	€12.5 million
16	(Argentina) Gastón Ávila	Left back	21	(Belgium) Antwerp	2023–24	€12.5 million
17	(Denmark) Mohamed Daramy	Striker	19	(Denmark) Copenhagen	2021–22	€12 million
18	(England) Chuba Akpom	Striker	27	(England) Middlesbrough	2023–24	€12 million
19	(Morocco) Hakim Ziyech	Midfielder	23	(Netherlands) Twente	2016–17	€11 million
20	(Netherlands) Davy Klaassen	Midfielder	27	(Germany) Werder Bremen	2020–21	€11 million
21	(Netherlands) Owen Wijndal	Left back	22	(Netherlands) AZ	2022–23	€10 million
22	(Netherlands) Klaas-Jan Huntelaar	Striker	22	(Netherlands) Heerenveen	2005–06	€9 million
23	(Argentina) Lisandro Magallán	Center back	24	(Argentina) Boca Juniors	2019–20	€9 million
24	(Ghana) Mohammed Kudus	Midfielder	20	(Denmark) Nordsjælland	2020–21	€9 million
25	(Sweden) Zlatan Ibrahimović	Striker	19	(Sweden) Malmö FF	2001–02	€8.7 million

Top 25 most expensive players sold

#	Player	Position	Age	New club	Season	Transfer fee
1	(Brazil) Antony	Winger	22	(England) Manchester United	2022–23	€100 million
2	(Netherlands) Matthijs de Ligt	Center back	19	(Italy) Juventus	2019–20	€85.5 million
3	(Netherlands) Frenkie de Jong	Midfielder	21	(Spain) Barcelona	2019–20	€75 million
4	(Argentina) Lisandro Martínez	Center back	24	(England) Manchester United	2022–23	€55 million
5	(Belgium) Mika Godts	Striker	21	(France) Paris Saint-Germain	2026-27	€55 million
6	(Netherlands) Donny van de Beek	Midfielder	23	(England) Manchester United	2020–21	€45 million
7	(Morocco) Hakim Ziyech	Midfielder	26	(England) Chelsea	2020–21	€45 million
8	(Ghana) Mohammed Kudus	Midfielder	23	(England) West Ham United	2023–24	€43 million
9	(Colombia) Davinson Sánchez	Center back	21	(England) Tottenham Hotspur	2017–18	€42 million
10	(Netherlands) Jurriën Timber	Center back	22	(England) Arsenal	2023–24	€40 million
11	(Mexico) Edson Álvarez	Center back	25	(England) West Ham United	2023–24	€38 million
12	(Ivory Coast) Sébastien Haller	Striker	28	(Germany) Borussia Dortmund	2022–23	€35 million
13	(Poland) Arkadiusz Milik	Striker	22	(Italy) Napoli	2016–17	€35 million
14	(Netherlands) Davy Klaassen	Midfielder	24	(England) Everton	2017–18	€27 million
15	(Netherlands) Klaas-Jan Huntelaar	Striker	25	(Spain) Real Madrid	2008–09	€27 million
16	(Netherlands) Wesley Sneijder	Midfielder	23	(Spain) Real Madrid	2007–08	€27 million
17	(Uruguay) Luis Suárez	Winger	24	(England) Liverpool	2010–11	€26.5 million
18	(United States) Sergiño Dest	Right back	19	(Spain) Barcelona	2020–21	€25 million
19	(Netherlands) Ryan Gravenberch	Midfielder	20	(Germany) Bayern Munich	2022–23	€24.5 million
20	(Nigeria) Calvin Bassey	Center back	23	(England) Fulham	2023–24	€22.5 million
21	(Denmark) Kasper Dolberg	Striker	21	(France) Nice	2019–20	€20.5 million
22	(Romania) Cristian Chivu	Center back	22	(Italy) Roma	2003–04	€18 million
23	(Netherlands) Daley Blind	Left back	24	(England) Manchester United	2014–15	€17.5 million
24	(Netherlands) Justin Kluivert	Winger	19	(Italy) Roma	2018–19	€17.5 million
25	(Netherlands) Dennis Bergkamp	Striker	24	(Italy) Internazionale	1993–94	€17.5 million
26	(Netherlands) Ryan Babel	Winger	20	(England) Liverpool	2007–08	€17.3 million

== AFC Ajax prize winners ==
At the end of each season, Ajax has awarded their top player of the season, the top talent of the season, and the top prospect from their training ground De Toekomst (The Future) with the following awards. Since 1993, the AFC Ajax Player of the Year (Dutch: Ajacied van het Jaar) is awarded the Rinus Michels Award, the AFC Ajax Talent of the Year (Dutch: Talent van het Jaar) is awarded the Marco van Basten Award since 1994. The club's top prospect from the training ground, the Talent of the Future (Dutch: Talent van De Toekomst) has been awarded the Sjaak Swart Award since 1999.

In 2018 the Talent of the Future award was renamed the Abdelhak Nouri Award, in honour of Abdelhak Nouri in commemoration of the 'jewel of the training ground', almost a year after the player had suffered an arrhythmia attack in a pre-season friendly match against Werder Bremen.

AFC Ajax Player of the Year
Rinus Michels Award

Year	Name
1993	(Netherlands) Dennis Bergkamp
1994	(Finland) Jari Litmanen
1995	(Netherlands) Frank Rijkaard
1996	(Netherlands) Marc Overmars
1997	(Netherlands) Ronald de Boer
1998	(Netherlands) Edwin van der Sar
1999	(Finland) Jari Litmanen
2000	(Denmark) Jesper Grønkjær
2001	(Romania) Cristian Chivu
2002	(Netherlands) Rafael van der Vaart
2003	(Romania) Cristian Chivu
2004	(Brazil) Maxwell
2005	(Netherlands) Nigel de Jong
2006	(Netherlands) Klaas-Jan Huntelaar
2007	(Netherlands) Wesley Sneijder
2008	(Netherlands) Maarten Stekelenburg
2009	(Uruguay) Luis Suárez
2010	(Uruguay) Luis Suárez
2011	(Netherlands) Maarten Stekelenburg
2012	(Belgium) Jan Vertonghen
2013	(Netherlands) Daley Blind
2014	(Denmark) Lasse Schöne
2015	(Netherlands) Jasper Cillessen
2016	(Netherlands) Jasper Cillessen
2017	(Colombia) Davinson Sánchez
2018	(Morocco) Hakim Ziyech
2019	(Morocco) Hakim Ziyech
2020	(Morocco) Hakim Ziyech
2021	(Serbia) Dušan Tadić
2022	(Argentina) Lisandro Martínez
2023	(Netherlands) Steven Berghuis
2024	(Netherlands) Brian Brobbey
2025	(Netherlands) Kenneth Taylor
2026	(Netherlands) Youri Baas

AFC Ajax Talent of the Year
Marco van Basten Award

Year	Name
1994	(Netherlands) Tarik Oulida
1995	(Nigeria) Nwankwo Kanu
1996	(Netherlands) Nordin Wooter
1997	(Netherlands) Mario Melchiot
1998	(South Africa) Benni McCarthy
1999	(Netherlands) Richard Knopper
2000	(Romania) Cristian Chivu
2001	(Netherlands) Rafael van der Vaart
2002	(Brazil) Maxwell
2003	(South Africa) Steven Pienaar
2004	(Romania) Nicolae Mitea
2005	(Netherlands) Hedwiges Maduro
2006	(Netherlands) Urby Emanuelson / (Belgium) Thomas Vermaelen
2007	(Netherlands) Ryan Babel
2008	(Belgium) Jan Vertonghen
2009	(Netherlands) Gregory van der Wiel
2010	(Belgium) Toby Alderweireld
2011	(Denmark) Christian Eriksen
2012	(Netherlands) Ricardo van Rhijn
2013	(Denmark) Viktor Fischer
2014	(Netherlands) Davy Klaassen
2015	(Netherlands) Anwar El Ghazi
2016	(Netherlands) Riechedly Bazoer
2017	(Denmark) Kasper Dolberg
2018	(Netherlands) Matthijs de Ligt
2019	(Morocco) Noussair Mazraoui
2020	(United States) Sergiño Dest
2021	(Netherlands) Ryan Gravenberch
2022	(Netherlands) Jurriën Timber
2023	(Netherlands) Kenneth Taylor
2024	(Netherlands) Jorrel Hato
2025	(Netherlands) Youri Baas
2026	(Belgium) Mika Godts

Talent of the Future
Sjaak Swart Award

Year	Name
1999	(Netherlands) Youssouf Hersi
2000	(Netherlands) Rafael van der Vaart
2001	(Netherlands) John Heitinga
2002	(Netherlands) Wesley Sneijder
2003	(Netherlands) Kenneth Vermeer
2004	(Turkey) Murat Yıldırım
2005	(Netherlands) Hedwiges Maduro
2006	(Netherlands) Donovan Slijngard
2007	(Netherlands) Siem de Jong
2008	(Netherlands) Daley Blind
2009	(Armenia) Aras Özbiliz
2010	(Denmark) Christian Eriksen
2011	(Netherlands) Davy Klaassen
2012	(Netherlands) Mickey van der Hart
2013	(Netherlands) Damon Mirani
2014	(Morocco) Aschraf El Mahdioui
2015	(Netherlands) Donny van de Beek
2016	(Netherlands) Matthijs de Ligt
2017	(Netherlands) Justin Kluivert

Talent of the Future
Abdelhak Nouri Award

Year	Name
2018	(Netherlands) Ryan Gravenberch
2019	(Turkey) Naci Ünüvar
2020	(Netherlands) Devyne Rensch
2021	(Netherlands) Amourricho van Axel Dongen
2022	(England) Charlie Setford
2023	(Netherlands) Jorrel Hato
2024	(Netherlands) Lucas Jetten
2025	(Netherlands) Sean Steur
2026	(Netherlands) Mohamed Abdalla

== VVCS-gala prize winners ==
The VVCS-gala is an annual gala which takes place at the end of each season, where the best Dutch Footballer, best keeper, topscorer of the Eredivisie, and the talent of the year are awarded. Here are a list Ajax players who have received awards at the gala in the past.

=== Dutch Footballer of the Year ===
Dutch Footballer of the Year is an award honouring the best Dutch Football player in the Eredivisie. Now the Golden boot is award to the best Footballer, when the two awards used to be presented separately in the past. The prize is nominated by De Telegraaf and Voetbal International, and is presented at the VVCS-gala.

Golden Boots

Year	Name
1982	(Netherlands) Wim Kieft
1983	(Netherlands) Piet Schrijvers
1985	(Netherlands) Frank Rijkaard
1986	(Netherlands) Marco van Basten
1987	(Netherlands) Frank Rijkaard
1993	(Netherlands) Marc Overmars
1995	(Netherlands) Danny Blind
1996	(Netherlands) Danny Blind
1998	(Netherlands) Edwin van der Sar
2002	(Romania) Cristian Chivu
2004	(Brazil) Maxwell
2008	(Netherlands) John Heitinga
2010	(Uruguay) Luis Suárez
2012	(Belgium) Jan Vertonghen
2014	(Netherlands) Daley Blind
2016	(Netherlands) Davy Klaassen
2018	(Morocco) Hakim Ziyech
2019	(Netherlands) Matthijs de Ligt
2021	(Serbia) Dušan Tadić

Footballer of the Year

Year	Name
1985	(Netherlands) Marco van Basten
1990	(Netherlands) Jan Wouters
1991	(Netherlands) Dennis Bergkamp
1992	(Netherlands) Dennis Bergkamp
1993	(Finland) Jari Litmanen
1994	(Netherlands) Ronald de Boer
1996	(Netherlands) Ronald de Boer
2004	(Brazil) Maxwell

Silver Boots

Year	Name
1975	(Netherlands) Ruud Geels
1984	(Netherlands) Marco van Basten
2013	(Denmark) Christian Eriksen
2021	(Netherlands) Davy Klaassen
2022	(Netherlands) Jurriën Timber

Bronze Boots

Year	Name
1977	(Netherlands) Ruud Geels
1978	(Netherlands) Ruud Geels
2008	(Netherlands) Klaas-Jan Huntelaar
2010	(Netherlands) Demy de Zeeuw
2012	(Denmark) Christian Eriksen
2018	(Netherlands) Matthijs de Ligt
2019	(Serbia) Dušan Tadić
2022	(Serbia) Dušan Tadić

=== Dutch Goalkeeper of the Year ===
The Dutch Goalkeeper of the Year was a title awarded to the best Goalkeeper of the Dutch Eredivisie. The prize was awarded at the gala from 1987 to 2004. Until 1997, the prize was awarded annually, but was awarded by the season after 1998–99.

Goalkeeper of the Year

Year	Name
1990	(Netherlands) Stanley Menzo
1994	(Netherlands) Edwin van der Sar
1995	(Netherlands) Edwin van der Sar
1996	(Netherlands) Edwin van der Sar
1997	(Netherlands) Edwin van der Sar

=== Dutch Talent of the Year ===
The Dutch Talent of the Year was a title awarded to the best Talent of the Dutch Eredivisie from 1984 to 2004. It was merged with the Johan Cruijff Prijs the following season.

Talent of the Year

Year	Name
1986	(Netherlands) Aron Winter
1987	(Netherlands) Bryan Roy
1989	(Netherlands) Richard Witschge
1990	(Netherlands) Dennis Bergkamp
1992	(Netherlands) Marc Overmars
1993	(Netherlands) Clarence Seedorf
1994	(Netherlands) Clarence Seedorf
1995	(Netherlands) Patrick Kluivert
2001	(Netherlands) Rafael van der Vaart
2004	(Netherlands) John Heitinga

Johan Cruyff Award

Year	Name
2004	(Netherlands) Wesley Sneijder
2006	(Netherlands) Klaas-Jan Huntelaar
2010	(Netherlands) Gregory van der Wiel
2011	(Denmark) Christian Eriksen
2014	(Netherlands) Davy Klaassen
2018	(Netherlands) Matthijs de Ligt
2019	(Netherlands) Frenkie de Jong
2021	(Netherlands) Ryan Gravenberch
2022	(Netherlands) Jurriën Timber
2025	(Netherlands) Jorrel Hato

=== Dutch Manager of the year ===
The Dutch professional manager of the Year is a title awarded to the best professional manager of the Dutch Eredivisie from 2003 to present. It is known as the Rinus Michels Award. (not to be confused with the AFC Ajax award by the same name)

Rinus Michels Award

Year	Name
2013	(Netherlands) Frank de Boer
2014	(Netherlands) Frank de Boer
2019	(Netherlands) Erik ten Hag
2021	(Netherlands) Erik ten Hag

=== Eredivisie top scorers ===
The following is a list of Ajax players who have finished the season as top scorer of the Dutch Eredivisie.

Ajax players who finished as Eredivisie top scorers by season

Season	Name	Goals
1959–60	(Netherlands) Henk Groot	38
1960–61	(Netherlands) Henk Groot	41
1966–67	(Netherlands) Johan Cruyff	33
1971–72	(Netherlands) Johan Cruyff	25
1974–75	(Netherlands) Ruud Geels	30
1975–76	(Netherlands) Ruud Geels	29
1976–77	(Netherlands) Ruud Geels	34
1977–78	(Netherlands) Ruud Geels	30
1981–82	(Netherlands) Wim Kieft	32
1983–84	(Netherlands) Marco van Basten	28
1984–85	(Netherlands) Marco van Basten	22
1985–86	(Netherlands) Marco van Basten	37
1986–87	(Netherlands) Marco van Basten	31
1990–91	(Netherlands) Dennis Bergkamp	25
1991–92	(Netherlands) Dennis Bergkamp	22
1992–93	(Netherlands) Dennis Bergkamp	26
1993–94	(Finland) Jari Litmanen	26
2005–06	(Netherlands) Klaas-Jan Huntelaar	33
2007–08	(Netherlands) Klaas-Jan Huntelaar	33
2009–10	(Uruguay) Luis Suárez	35
2018–19	(Serbia) Dušan Tadić	28
2021–22	(Ivory Coast) Sébastien Haller	21

== International prize winners ==
=== Ballon d'Or ===
1st place

The following players received the Ballon d'Or award whilst playing for AFC Ajax:

- (Netherlands) Johan Cruyff – 1971*

One other Ballon d'Or winner, former Ajax player and youth product was hired by AFC Ajax: Marco van Basten, winning the Ballon d'Or in 1988, 1989, 1992, whilst plying his trade at AC Milan, coached the Ajax first team for the 2008–09 season.

- Johan Cruyff went on to win the Ballon d'Or twice more in 1973 and 1974 whilst plying his trade for FC Barcelona.

3rd-place finish

The following players finished in third place in the Ballon d'Or award whilst playing for AFC Ajax:

- (Netherlands) Ruud Krol – 1979
- (Netherlands) Dennis Bergkamp – 1992
- (Finland) Jari Litmanen – 1995

=== European Golden Shoe ===
The following players have won the European Golden Shoe whilst playing for AFC Ajax:

- (Netherlands) Wim Kieft (32 goals) – 1982
- (Netherlands) Marco van Basten (37 goals) – 1986

=== European Cup/Champions League top scorer ===
The following players have finished as top scorer of the European Cup/Champions League whilst playing for AFC Ajax:

- (Netherlands) Johan Cruyff (5 goals) – 1971–72
- (Denmark) Søren Lerby (10 goals) – 1979–80
- (Finland) Jari Litmanen (9 goals) – 1995–96

=== UEFA Cup/Europa League top scorer ===
The following players have finished as top scorer of the UEFA Cup/Europa League whilst playing for AFC Ajax:

- (Netherlands) Ruud Geels (14 goals) – 1975–76

=== European Golden Boy ===
The following players have won the Golden Boy Award whilst playing for AFC Ajax:

- (Netherlands) Rafael van der Vaart – 2003
- (Netherlands) Matthijs de Ligt – 2018

=== UEFA Jubilee Golden Player ===
The following players were commemorated as the Golden Players for each member association at UEFA's 50th anniversary in 2004:

- (Netherlands) Johan Cruyff
- (Denmark) Michael Laudrup
- (Finland) Jari Litmanen

=== UEFA Euro Golden Boot ===
The following players were awarded the golden boot at the UEFA European Championship whilst playing for AFC Ajax:

- (Netherlands) Dennis Bergkamp (1992)

=== UEFA Euro Team of the Tournament ===
The following players made the Best XI at the UEFA European Championship whilst playing for AFC Ajax:

- (Netherlands) Ruud Krol (1976)
- (Netherlands) Dennis Bergkamp (1992)

=== FIFA World Cup All-Star Team ===
The following players made the FIFA World Cup All-Star team at the FIFA World Cup whilst playing for AFC Ajax:

- (Netherlands) Frank de Boer (1998)
- (Denmark) Michael Laudrup (1998)
- (Netherlands) Edwin van der Sar (1998)
- (Uruguay) Luis Suárez (2010)

=== FIFA World Cup Best Young Player Award ===
The following players were awarded the Best Young Player Award at the FIFA World Cup whilst playing for AFC Ajax:

- (Netherlands) Marc Overmars (1994)

== Ajax players on the Netherlands national team ==
Players still playing for Ajax are highlighted

The following is a list of players who have played for the Netherlands national football team while playing for Ajax. The first column reflects the player's caps for the national team during their tenure at Ajax, while the second column shows the player's total appearances for the national team. The third column represents the number of goals scored in total, except when marked with an asterisk (*), which indicates goals conceded in case of a goalkeeper.

Ajax players with the Netherlands national team

#	Name	Matches (Ajax)	Matches (Total)	Goals (Total)
1.	Ruud Krol	71	83	4
2.	Frank de Boer	65	112	13
3.	Wim Suurbier	53	60	3
4.	Ronald de Boer	49	67	13
5.	Wim Anderiesen	46	46	0
6.	Bennie Muller	43	43	3
7.	Danny Blind	40	42	1
8.	Maarten Stekelenburg	40	58	48*
9.	Daley Blind	39	74	2
10.	John Heitinga	39	87	7
11.	Edwin van der Sar	39	130	87*
12.	John van 't Schip	38	41	2
13.	Jan Wouters	38	70	4
14.	Henk Groot	35	39	12
15.	Frank Rijkaard	35	73	10
16.	Piet Schrijvers	35	46	40
17.	Wesley Sneijder	35	134	31
18.	Gregory van der Wiel	35	46	0
19.	Piet Keizer	34	34	11
20.	Marc Overmars	34	86	17
21.	Dolf van Kol	33	33	4
22.	Aron Winter	32	84	6
23.	Sjaak Swart	31	31	10
24.	Jasper Cillessen	30	60	56*
25.	Rafael van der Vaart	29	109	25
26.	Johan Neeskens	24	49	17
27.	Dennis Bergkamp	23	79	37
28.	Joël Veltman	22	27	2
29.	Johan Cruyff	21	48	33
30.	Arie Haan	21	35	6
31.	Jan de Natris	20	23	5
32.	Anton Pronk	19	19	0
33.	Klaas-Jan Huntelaar	18	76	42
34.	Sonny Silooy	18	25	0
35.	Matthijs de Ligt	17	23	2
36.	Davy Klaassen	17	19	4
37.	Marco van Basten	16	58	24
38.	Peter Boeve	16	16	0
39.	Piet van der Kuil	16	40	9
40.	Richard Witschge	16	31	1
41.	Arnold Mühren	15	23	3
42.	Edo Ophof	15	15	2
43.	Johnny Rep	15	42	12
44.	Ryan Babel	14	67	10
45.	John Bosman	14	30	17
46.	Barry Hulshoff	14	14	6
47.	Patrick Kluivert	14	79	40
48.	Tschen La Ling	14	14	2
49.	Klaas Nuninga	14	19	4
50.	Urby Emanuelson	13	17	0
51.	Bryan Roy	13	32	9
52.	Dick Schoenaker	13	13	6
53.	Ruud Geels	12	20	11
54.	Hedwiges Maduro	12	18	0
55.	Michael Reiziger	12	72	1
56.	Ronald Spelbos	12	21	1
57.	Joop Stoffelen	12	12	0
58.	Gerald Vanenburg	12	42	1
59.	Peter van Vossen	11	31	9
60.	Donny van de Beek	10	17	2
61.	Nigel de Jong	10	81	1
62.	Ronald Koeman	10	78	14
63.	Gerrie Mühren	10	10	0
64.	Edgar Davids	9	74	6
65.	Henk Hordijk	9	9	0
66.	Frenkie de Jong	9	22	1
67.	Co Prins	9	10	3
68.	Quincy Promes	9	47	7
69.	Winston Bogarde	8	20	0
70.	Ricardo van Rhijn	8	8	0
71.	Ge Fortgens	8	8	0
72.	Wim Jonk	8	49	11
73.	Rob de Wit	8	8	3
74.	Guus Dräger	7	13	5
75.	Henk van der Linden	7	7	0
76.	Piet Ouderland	7	7	0
77.	Wim Volkers	7	7	2
78.	Demy de Zeeuw	7	27	0
79.	Riechedly Bazoer	6	6	0
80.	Siem de Jong	6	6	2
81.	Wim Kieft	6	43	11
82.	Stanley Menzo	6	6	10
83.	Fons Pelser	6	6	0
84.	Jan Potharst	6	6	0
85.	Nico Rijnders	6	8	0
86.	Simon Tahamata	6	22	2
87.	Kenny Tete	6	13	0
88.	Jan de Boer	5	5	4*
89.	Dick van Dijk	5	7	1
90.	Joop van Dort	5	5	0
91.	Peter Hoekstra	5	5	0
92.	Rinus Michels	5	5	0
93.	Clarence Seedorf	5	87	11
94.	Hans Boskamp	4	4	0
95.	Jan van Diepenbeek	4	4	0
96.	Theo van Duivenbode	4	5	0
97.	Andy van der Meyde	4	17	1
98.	Peet Petersen	4	4	1
99.	Eddy Pieters Graafland	4	47	73*
100.	Kenneth Vermeer	4	5	0*
101.	Wim Addicks	3	3	2
102.	Vurnon Anita	3	3	0
103.	Hein Delsen	3	3	0
104.	Wim Gupffert	3	3	2
105.	Cor van der Hoeven	3	3	0
106.	Jaïro Riedewald	3	3	0
107.	Gerrie Stroker	3	3	0
108.	Henk Blomvliet	2	2	0
109.	Nico Buwalda	2	2	0
110.	Gé van Dijk	2	2	0
111.	Anwar El Ghazi	2	2	0
112.	Gerrit Keizer	2	2	7
113.	Keje Molenaar	2	2	0
114.	Henk Mulders	2	2	1
115.	Piet van Reenen	2	2	0
116.	Jan Schubert	2	2	0
117.	Nick Viergever	2	3	0
118.	Marciano Vink	2	2	0
119.	Theo Brokmann	1	1	1
120.	Justin Kluivert	1	2	0
121.	Andre de Kruijff	1	1	0
122.	Henny Meijer	1	1	0
123.	René Notten	1	5	0
124.	Theo Schetters	1	1	0
125.	Rob Witschge	1	30	3

Statistics accurate as of 18 November 2020 after the match against Poland.

== Ajax players in international tournaments ==
The following is a list of Ajax players who have competed in international tournaments, including the FIFA World Cup, FIFA Confederations Cup, UEFA European Championship, UEFA Nations League Finals, CONCACAF Nations League Finals, CONCACAF Gold Cup, the Copa América and the Africa Cup of Nations. To this date no Ajax players have participated in the AFC Asian Cup, or the OFC Nations Cup while playing for Ajax.

Cup	Players
(Italy) 1934 FIFA World Cup	(Netherlands) Wim Anderiesen (Netherlands) Jan van Diepenbeek
(France) 1938 FIFA World Cup	(Netherlands) Wim Anderiesen (Netherlands) Dick Been
(West Germany) 1974 FIFA World Cup	(Netherlands) Arie Haan (silver) (Netherlands) Piet Keizer (silver) (Netherlands) Ruud Krol (silver) (Netherlands) Johan Neeskens (silver) (Netherlands) Johnny Rep (silver) (Netherlands) Wim Suurbier (silver)
(Socialist Federal Republic of Yugoslavia) UEFA Euro 1976	(Netherlands) Ruud Geels (bronze) (Netherlands) Ruud Krol (bronze) (Netherlands) Piet Schrijvers (bronze) (Netherlands) Wim Suurbier (bronze)
(Argentina) 1978 FIFA World Cup	(Netherlands) Ruud Krol (silver) (Netherlands) Dick Schoenaker (silver) (Netherlands) Piet Schrijvers (silver)
(Italy) UEFA Euro 1980	(Netherlands) Piet Schrijvers
(France) UEFA Euro 1984	(Denmark) Jan Mølby (Denmark) Jesper Olsen
(West Germany) UEFA Euro 1988	(Netherlands) John Bosman (gold) (Netherlands) Arnold Mühren (gold) (Netherlands) John van 't Schip (gold) (Netherlands) Aron Winter (gold) (Netherlands) Jan Wouters (gold)
(Italy) 1990 FIFA World Cup	(Netherlands) Danny Blind (Sweden) Peter Larsson (Netherlands) Stanley Menzo (Sweden) Stefan Pettersson (Netherlands) Bryan Roy (Netherlands) John van 't Schip (Netherlands) Aron Winter (Netherlands) Richard Witschge (Netherlands) Jan Wouters
(Sweden) UEFA Euro 1992	(Netherlands) Dennis Bergkamp (Netherlands) Danny Blind (Netherlands) Frank de Boer (Netherlands) Wim Jonk (Netherlands) Stanley Menzo (Netherlands) Bryan Roy (Netherlands) John van 't Schip (Netherlands) Aron Winter
(Tunisia) 1994 Africa Cup of Nations	(Nigeria) Finidi George (gold)
(United States) 1994 FIFA World Cup	(Netherlands) Danny Blind (Netherlands) Frank de Boer (Netherlands) Ronald de Boer (Nigeria) Finidi George (Netherlands) Marc Overmars (Netherlands) Frank Rijkaard (Netherlands) Edwin van der Sar (Netherlands) Peter van Vossen
(England) UEFA Euro 1996	(Netherlands) Danny Blind (Netherlands) Ronald de Boer (Netherlands) Winston Bogarde (Netherlands) Edgar Davids (Netherlands) Peter Hoekstra (Netherlands) Patrick Kluivert (Netherlands) Michael Reiziger (Netherlands) Edwin van der Sar
(Burkina Faso) 1998 Africa Cup of Nations	(South Africa) Benni McCarthy (silver)
(France) 1998 FIFA World Cup	(Nigeria) Tijani Babangida (Netherlands) Frank de Boer (Netherlands) Ronald de Boer (Denmark) Michael Laudrup (South Africa) Benni McCarthy (Nigeria) Sunday Oliseh (Netherlands) Edwin van der Sar
(Ghana) (Nigeria) 2000 Africa Cup of Nations	(Nigeria) Tijani Babangida (silver)
(Belgium) (Netherlands) UEFA Euro 2000	(Romania) Cristian Chivu (Denmark) Jesper Grønkjær (Romania) Bogdan Lobonț (Netherlands) Aron Winter
(Mali) 2002 Africa Cup of Nations	(Egypt) Mido (Tunisia) Hatem Trabelsi
(South Korea) (Japan) 2002 FIFA World Cup	(Sweden) Zlatan Ibrahimović (Nigeria) Pius Ikedia (United States) John O'Brien (South Africa) Steven Pienaar (Tunisia) Hatem Trabelsi
(Tunisia) 2004 Africa Cup of Nations	(Tunisia) Hatem Trabelsi (gold)
(Portugal) UEFA Euro 2004	(Czech Republic) Tomáš Galásek (Czech Republic) Zdeněk Grygera (Netherlands) John Heitinga (Sweden) Zlatan Ibrahimović (Netherlands) Wesley Sneijder (Netherlands) Rafael van der Vaart
(Germany) 2005 FIFA Confederations Cup	(Greece) Angelos Charisteas (Tunisia) Hatem Trabelsi
(Egypt) 2006 Africa Cup of Nations	(Tunisia) Hatem Trabelsi
(Germany) 2006 FIFA World Cup	(Netherlands) Ryan Babel (Czech Republic) Tomáš Galásek (Czech Republic) Zdeněk Grygera (Netherlands) John Heitinga (Netherlands) Hedwiges Maduro (Sweden) Markus Rosenberg (Netherlands) Wesley Sneijder (Netherlands) Maarten Stekelenburg (Tunisia) Hatem Trabelsi
(Spain) 2007 UEFA–CAF Meridian Cup	(Netherlands) Vurnon Anita
(Austria) (Switzerland) UEFA Euro 2008	(Netherlands) John Heitinga (Netherlands) Klaas-Jan Huntelaar (Netherlands) Maarten Stekelenburg
(Angola) 2010 Africa Cup of Nations	(Cameroon) Eyong Enoh
(South Africa) 2010 FIFA World Cup	(Cameroon) Eyong Enoh (Denmark) Christian Eriksen (Uruguay) Nicolás Lodeiro (Serbia) Marko Pantelić (Denmark) Dennis Rommedahl (Netherlands) Maarten Stekelenburg (silver) (Uruguay) Luis Suárez (Netherlands) Gregory van der Wiel (silver) (Netherlands) Demy de Zeeuw (silver)
(Argentina) 2011 Copa América	(Uruguay) Nicolás Lodeiro (gold)
(Poland) (Ukraine) UEFA Euro 2012	(Denmark) Christian Eriksen (Netherlands) Gregory van der Wiel
(South Africa) 2013 Africa Cup of Nations	(South Africa) Thulani Serero
(Brazil) 2014 FIFA World Cup	(Netherlands) Daley Blind (bronze) (Netherlands) Jasper Cillessen (bronze) (Netherlands) Joël Veltman (bronze)
(France) UEFA Euro 2016	(Poland) Arkadiusz Milik
(Gabon) 2017 Africa Cup of Nations	(Burkina Faso) Bertrand Traoré (bronze)
(Russia) 2017 FIFA Confederations Cup	(Cameroon) André Onana (Germany) Amin Younes (gold)
(Russia) 2018 FIFA World Cup	(Denmark) Kasper Dolberg (Denmark) Lasse Schöne (Argentina) Nicolás Tagliafico (Morocco) Hakim Ziyech
(Portugal) 2019 UEFA Nations League Finals	(Netherlands) Donny van de Beek (silver) (Netherlands) Daley Blind (silver) (Netherlands) Frenkie de Jong (silver) (Netherlands) Matthijs de Ligt (silver)
(Brazil) 2019 Copa América	(Brazil) David Neres (gold) (Argentina) Nicolás Tagliafico (bronze)
(Egypt) 2019 Africa Cup of Nations	(Morocco) Noussair Mazraoui (Cameroon) André Onana (Morocco) Hakim Ziyech
(Europe) UEFA Euro 2020	(Netherlands) Daley Blind (Netherlands) Ryan Gravenberch (Netherlands) Davy Klaassen (Netherlands) Maarten Stekelenburg (Netherlands) Jurriën Timber
(United States) 2021 CONCACAF Nations League Finals	(Mexico) Edson Álvarez (silver)
(Brazil) 2021 Copa América	(Argentina) Lisandro Martínez (gold) (Argentina) Nicolás Tagliafico (gold)
(United States) 2021 CONCACAF Gold Cup	(Mexico) Edson Álvarez (silver) (Suriname) Sean Klaiber
(Cameroon) 2021 Africa Cup of Nations	(Ivory Coast) Sébastien Haller (Ghana) Mohammed Kudus (Cameroon) André Onana (bronze)
(England) 2022 CONMEBOL–UEFA Cup of Champions	(Argentina) Lisandro Martínez (gold) (Argentina) Nicolás Tagliafico (gold)
(Qatar) 2022 FIFA World Cup	(Mexico) Edson Álvarez (Netherlands) Steven Berghuis (Netherlands) Steven Bergwijn (Netherlands) Daley Blind (Netherlands) Davy Klaassen (Ghana) Mohammed Kudus (Mexico) Jorge Sánchez (Serbia) Dušan Tadić (Netherlands) Kenneth Taylor (Netherlands) Jurriën Timber (Netherlands) Remko Pasveer
(Netherlands) 2023 UEFA Nations League Finals	(Netherlands) Steven Bergwijn (Netherlands) Jurriën Timber
(United States) 2023 CONCACAF Nations League Finals	(Mexico) Edson Álvarez (bronze) (Mexico) Jorge Sánchez (bronze)
(United States) (Canada) 2023 CONCACAF Gold Cup	(Mexico) Edson Álvarez (gold) (Mexico) Jorge Sánchez (gold)
(Germany) UEFA Euro 2024	(Netherlands) Steven Bergwijn (Netherlands) Brian Brobbey (Turkey) Ahmetcan Kaplan (Croatia) Borna Sosa (Croatia) Josip Šutalo
(United States) 2024 Copa América	(Argentina) Gerónimo Rulli (gold)
(Canada) (Mexico) (United States) 2026 FIFA World Cup	(Japan) Kō Itakura (Croatia) Josip Šutalo (Japan) Takehiro Tomiyasu (Netherlands) Wout Weghorst

- Medals in the table above indicate the final placement achieved at the tournament.

=== Ajax youth players in international youth tournaments ===
The following is a list of Ajax players who have competed in international youth tournaments, including the international youth tournaments of UEFA, but also the AFC (Asia), CAF (Africa), and CONCACAF (North-America). To this date no Ajax players have participated in the CONMEBOL (South America) or the OFC (Oceania) youth competitions.

Cup	Players
(Europe) 1988 UEFA European Under-21 Championship	(Netherlands) Rob Witschge
(Spain) 1992 UEFA European Under-21 Championship	(Netherlands) Frank de Boer (Netherlands) Ronald de Boer (Netherlands) Michel Kreek (Netherlands) Marc Overmars
(Romania) 1998 UEFA European Under-21 Championship	(Netherlands) Mario Melchiot
(Israel) 2000 UEFA European Under-16 Championship	(Netherlands) Dirk-Jan in den Eng (bronze) (Netherlands) John Heitinga (bronze) (Netherlands) Rafael van der Vaart (bronze)
(Slovakia) 2000 UEFA European Under-21 Championship	(Netherlands) Richard Knopper (Netherlands) John Nieuwenburg
(England) 2001 UEFA European Under-16 Championship	(Netherlands) Sergio Hellings (Netherlands) Nigel de Jong (Netherlands) Sherjill MacDonald (Netherlands) Wesley Sneijder (Netherlands) Boy Waterman
(Denmark) 2002 UEFA European Under-17 Championship	(Netherlands) Ferdi Elmas (Netherlands) Hedwiges Maduro (Netherlands) Dwight Tiendalli
(Norway) 2002 UEFA European Under-19 Championship	(Belgium) Bram Verbist
(Switzerland) 2004 UEFA European Under-19 Championship	(Belgium) Thomas Vermaelen
(Italy) 2005 UEFA European Under-17 Championship	(Netherlands) Vurnon Anita (silver) (Netherlands) John Goossens (silver) (Netherlands) Jeffrey Sarpong (silver) (Netherlands) Koen Verhoeff (silver)
(Benin) 2005 U-20 African Youth Championship	(Morocco) Rachid Tiberkanine
(Luxembourg) 2006 UEFA European Under-17 Championship	(Belgium) Toby Alderweireld
(Portugal) 2006 UEFA European Under-21 Championship	(Netherlands) Urby Emanuelson (gold) (Netherlands) Klaas-Jan Huntelaar (gold) (Netherlands) Kenneth Vermeer (gold)
(Belgium) 2007 UEFA European Under-17 Championship	(Netherlands) Daley Blind (Netherlands) Timothy van der Meulen (Netherlands) Sergio Padt
(Netherlands) 2007 UEFA European Under-21 Championship	(Netherlands) Ryan Babel (gold) (Netherlands) Hedwiges Maduro (gold) (Belgium) Tom De Mul (Netherlands) Robbert Schilder (gold) (Belgium) Thomas Vermaelen (Netherlands) Kenneth Vermeer (gold) (Belgium) Jan Vertonghen
(Turkey) 2008 UEFA European Under-17 Championship	(Netherlands) Roly Bonevacia (Netherlands) Lorenzo Burnet (Netherlands) Geoffrey Castillion (Netherlands) Lorenzo Ebecilio (Netherlands) Dico Koppers (Netherlands) Ricardo van Rhijn (Netherlands) Rodney Sneijder
(Germany) 2009 UEFA European Under-17 Championship	(Netherlands) Warner Hahn (silver) (Netherlands) Dico Koppers (silver) (Netherlands) Ruben Ligeon (silver) (Netherlands) Joël Veltman (silver)
(Rwanda) 2009 U-20 African Youth Championship	(South Africa) Daylon Claasen
(Sweden) 2009 UEFA European Under-21 Championship	(Serbia) Miralem Sulejmani
(France) 2010 UEFA European Under-19 Championship	(Netherlands) Lorenzo Ebecilio (Netherlands) Florian Jozefzoon (Netherlands) Ricardo van Rhijn (Netherlands) Rodney Sneijder
(Serbia) 2011 UEFA European Under-17 Championship	(Netherlands) Danzell Gravenberch (gold) (Netherlands) Peter Leeuwenburgh (gold)
(Denmark) 2011 UEFA European Under-21 Championship	(Denmark) Nicolai Boilesen (Denmark) Christian Eriksen
(Slovenia) 2012 UEFA European Under-17 Championship	(Netherlands) Elton Acolatse (gold) (Netherlands) Djavan Anderson (gold) (Netherlands) Branco van den Boomen (gold) (Netherlands) Queensy Menig (gold)
(Lithuania) 2013 UEFA European Under-19 Championship	(Netherlands) Danzell Gravenberch (Netherlands) Mickey van der Hart (Serbia) Dejan Meleg (Netherlands) Kenny Tete
(Mexico) 2013 CONCACAF U-20 Championship	(Curaçao) Derwin Martina (Curaçao) Rowendy Schoop
(Israel) 2013 UEFA European Under-21 Championship	(Netherlands) Daley Blind (Netherlands) Danny Hoesen (Netherlands) Ricardo van Rhijn
(Malta) 2014 UEFA European Under-17 Championship	(Netherlands) Donny van de Beek (silver) (Netherlands) Abdelhak Nouri (silver) (Netherlands) Mauro Savastano (silver)
(Bulgaria) 2015 UEFA European Under-17 Championship	(Netherlands) Reda Boultam (Netherlands) Carel Eiting (Netherlands) Matthijs de Ligt (Netherlands) Donyell Malen (Netherlands) Dani de Wit
(Greece) 2015 UEFA European Under-19 Championship	(Netherlands) Damon Mirani (Netherlands) Abdelhak Nouri (Netherlands) Leeroy Owusu (Netherlands) Terry Lartey Sanniez
(Czech Republic) 2015 UEFA European Under-21 Championship	(Denmark) Viktor Fischer
(Azerbaijan) 2016 UEFA European Under-17 Championship	(Belgium) Francesco Antonucci (Netherlands) Navajo Bakboord (Netherlands) Justin Kluivert (Netherlands) Matthijs de Ligt (Netherlands) Ché Nunnely
(Germany) 2016 UEFA European Under-19 Championship	(Netherlands) Vince Gino Dekker (Netherlands) Carel Eiting (Netherlands) Abdelhak Nouri (Netherlands) Deyovaisio Zeefuik
(Croatia) 2017 UEFA European Under-17 Championship	(Netherlands) Mitchel Bakker (Hungary) Szabolcs Schön
(Georgia (country)) 2017 UEFA European Under-19 Championship	(Netherlands) Navajo Bakboord (Netherlands) Boy Kemper (Netherlands) Noa Lang (Netherlands) Ché Nunnely (Netherlands) Dani de Wit
(Poland) 2017 UEFA European Under-21 Championship	(Czech Republic) Václav Černý
(England) 2018 UEFA European Under-17 Championship	(Netherlands) Brian Brobbey (gold) (Netherlands) Liam van Gelderen (gold) (Netherlands) Ryan Gravenberch (gold) (Netherlands) Nordin Musampa (gold) (Netherlands) Jurriën Timber (gold) (Netherlands) Quinten Timber (gold)
(Indonesia) 2018 AFC U-19 Championship	(Australia) Sebastian Pasquali
(Finland) 2018 UEFA European Under-19 Championship	(Finland) Saku Ylätupa
(United States) 2018 CONCACAF U-20 Championship	(United States) Sergiño Dest (gold)
(Republic of Ireland) 2019 UEFA European Under-17 Championship	(Netherlands) Brian Brobbey (gold) (Netherlands) Sontje Hansen (gold) (Netherlands) Neraysho Kasanwirjo (gold) (Netherlands) Calvin Raatsie (gold) (Netherlands) Devyne Rensch (gold) (Netherlands) Anass Salah-Eddine (gold) (Netherlands) Kenneth Taylor (gold) (Netherlands) Naci Ünüvar (gold)
(Italy) 2019 UEFA European Under-21 Championship	(Denmark) Rasmus Kristensen
(Hungary) (Slovakia) 2021 UEFA European Under-21 Championship	(Netherlands) Brian Brobbey (Netherlands) Jurgen Ekkelenkamp (Croatia) Dominik Kotarski (Netherlands) Devyne Rensch (Netherlands) Kjell Scherpen (Netherlands) Perr Schuurs
(Israel) 2022 UEFA European Under-17 Championship	(Netherlands) Oualid Agougil (silver) (Netherlands) Yoram Boerhout (silver) (Netherlands) Alvaro Henry (silver) (Belgium) Stanis Idumbo Muzambo (Netherlands) Gabriel Osei Misehouy (silver) (Netherlands) Silvano Vos (silver)
(Guatemala) 2023 CONCACAF U-17 Championship	(Curaçao) Janairo Concincion (Suriname) D'Angelo Lobman (Suriname) Sanyika Puljhun (Suriname) Kenzo Riedewald (Curaçao) Giandro Sambo
(Algeria) 2023 U-17 Africa Cup of Nations	(Morocco) Zakaria Ouazane (silver)
(Hungary) 2023 UEFA European Under-17 Championship	(Netherlands) Avery Appiah (Netherlands) Dies Janse (Netherlands) Precious Ugwu (Netherlands) Kayden Wolff
(Georgia (country)) (Romania) 2023 UEFA European Under-21 Championship	(Netherlands) Brian Brobbey (Portugal) Francisco Conceição (Netherlands) Devyne Rensch (Netherlands) Kenneth Taylor
(Indonesia) 2023 FIFA U-17 World Cup	(Morocco) Yasser El Aissati (Morocco) Zakaria Ouazane (England) Tommy Setford

- Medals in the table above indicate the final placement achieved at the tournament.

== Ajax players at the Olympic games ==
The following is a list of Ajax players who have competed in the Summer Olympics while playing for Ajax.

Cup	Players
(Sweden) 1912 Summer Olympics – Stockholm	(Netherlands) Ge Fortgens (bronze)
(Belgium) 1920 Summer Olympics – Antwerp	(Netherlands) Joop van Dort (bronze) (Netherlands) Jan de Natris (bronze)
(France) 1924 Summer Olympics – Paris	(Netherlands) Jan de Boer (Netherlands) Jan de Natris
(Netherlands) 1928 Summer Olympics – Amsterdam	(Netherlands) Jan de Boer (Netherlands) Dolf van Kol
(United Kingdom) 1948 Summer Olympics – London	(Netherlands) Guus Dräger (Netherlands) Joop Stoffelen
(United States) 1996 Summer Olympics – Atlanta	(Portugal) Dani (Australia) Hayden Foxe (Nigeria) Nwankwo Kanu (gold)
(Australia) 2000 Summer Olympics – Sydney	(Australia) Jason Culina (Nigeria) Pius Ikedia (Nigeria) Christopher Kanu (South Africa) Aaron Mokoena (United States) John O'Brien
(China) 2008 Summer Olympics – Beijing	(Netherlands) Urby Emanuelson (Belgium) Thomas Vermaelen (Netherlands) Kenneth Vermeer (Belgium) Jan Vertonghen
(Japan) 2020 Summer Olympics – Tokyo	(Brazil) Antony (gold)
(France) 2024 Summer Olympics – Paris	(Argentina) Gerónimo Rulli

- Medals in the table above indicate the final placement in the medal table achieved at the specific Olympic games.
