= Brokmann =

Brokmann or Brokman is a Dutch surname. Notable people with the surname include:

- Shimshon Brokman (born 1957), Israeli Olympic sailor
- Theo Brokmann Sr. (1893–1956), Dutch footballer
- Theo Brokmann Jr. (1922–2003), Dutch footballer
