= Wim Bleijenberg =

Dutch footballer

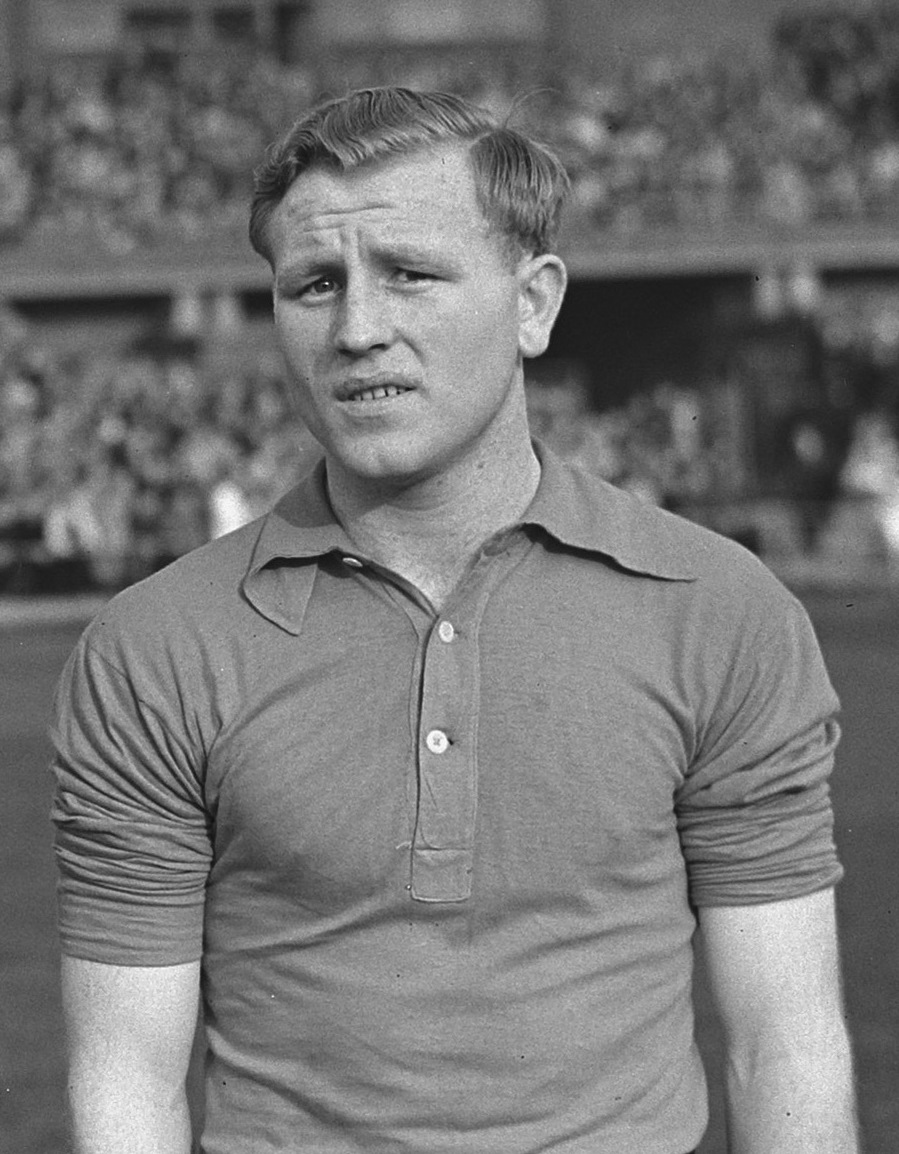

Personal information
- Full name: Willem Bleijenberg
- Date of birth: 5 November 1930
- Place of birth: Veenendaal, Netherlands
- Date of death: 10 January 2016 (aged 85)
- Place of death: Huissen, Netherlands
- Position: Forward

Youth career
- VV Veenendaal

Senior career*
Years	Team	Apps	(Gls)
1951–1952	Wageningen		(21)
1952–1956	Rigtersbleek		
1956–1960	Ajax	79	(46)
1960–1962	Blauw-Wit	55	(46)
1962–1963	Go Ahead Eagles	27	(20)
1963–1966	AGOVV	60	(38)

International career^{‡}
1953–1954	Netherlands	3	(0)
- * Club domestic league appearances and goals as of 16 January 2013 ‡ National team caps and goals as of 16 January 2013

Wim Bleijenberg (5 November 1930 – 10 January 2016) was a Dutch international football player, who played for FC Wageningen, Rigtersbleek, AFC Ajax, Blauw-Wit Amsterdam, Go Ahead Eagles and AGOVV Apeldoorn during his career.

He was nicknamed Wim Kontje (Bill Backside) because of his ability to turn away from his opponents.

== Club career ==
=== Early career ===
Born and raised in Veenendaal, on the outskirts of Utrecht, Bleijenberg began his career in the youth ranks of local VV Veenendaal from where he eventually signed with FC Wageningen making his debut in the 1951–52 season, and scoring 21 goals for the side from Wageningen. After just one season however Bleijenberg signed with Enschede club Rigtersbleek where he played 4 seasons, before signing with AFC Ajax.

=== Ajax ===
Starting his career with Ajax in the 1956–57 season, Bleijenberg led the club in scoring in league matches having scored 16 goals in 18 league appearances that first season in which he helped Ajax win the National Championship. He led the club in scoring for league matches alongside teammate Piet van der Kuil two years later, scoring 15 goals that season. He would go on to play one more seasons for the club from Amsterdam, bringing his total to four seasons, becoming the club's 45 all-time leading goal scorer (scoring record position as of Jan 2013). He scored 10 goals in official league matches for Ajax the following season, and 15 more the year after that. His final season with Ajax in 1959–60 saw Bleijenberg getting little playing time, only scoring 1 goal in 4 league matches for the club, winning one more league title with Ajax when he scored a hattrick in the title decider against arch-rivals Feyenoord, before transferring across town to local rivals Blauw-Wit Amsterdam at the end of the season. He totalled 88 games, scoring 51 goals in all competitions for Ajax.

=== Blauw-Wit ===
Remaining in Amsterdam, Bleijenberg joined Blauw-Wit where he played for one season, scoring 16 goals in 28 league matches before transferring over to Go Ahead Eagles from Deventer. He won promotion with the club in 1961.

=== Go Ahead Eagles ===
Moving to Deventer, Bleijenberg would play two seasons for Go Ahead Eagles helping the club to get promoted to the Eredivisie in 1963, before transferring to AGOVV Apeldoorn.

=== AGOVV Apeldoorn ===
In 1963 after two seasons with Go Ahead Eagles, Bleijenberg transferred to AGOVV, retiring from professional football after three seasons with the club from Apeldoorn.

== International career ==
From 1953 to 1954, Bleijenberg made 3 appearances for the Netherlands national team, playing a starting role and playing the entire match in all three of his matches. The three fixtures he played in were a 2–0 loss against Belgium at home on 19 April 1953, a 4–0 loss against Norway in an away fixture on 27 September 1953, and finally a 3–1 loss against Switzerland in an away match on 30 May 1954. Unable to score in all three fixtures, Bleijenberg was not called back up to the national team again.

== Personal life ==
He managed amateur sides SDVB, VVOP, Nunspeet, VEVO and his son Hans also played professional football for Vitesse Arnhem, FC Eindhoven en SC Cambuur.

=== Death ===
Bleijenberg died in January 2016, aged 85.

== Honours ==
=== Club ===
Ajax

- Eredivisie: 1956–57, 1959–60

== Statistics for Ajax ==
Club	Season	League		Cup		Europe		Other		Total	
Club	Season	Apps	Goals	Apps	Goals	Apps	Goals	Apps	Goals	Apps	Goals
Ajax	1956/57	30	16	3	4	-	-	-	-	33	20
Ajax	1957/58	26	10	-	-	4	1	-	-	30	11
Ajax	1958/59	18	15	-	-	-	-	-	-	18	15
Ajax	1959/60	5^{1}	5	-	-	-	-	2	0	7	5
Total		79	46	3	4	4	1	2	0	88	51

^{1} Includes championship play-off.
