= Edwin Bakker =

Dutch academic (born 1967)

Edwin Bakker (born 20 October 1967) is head of the knowledge and research department of the Netherlands Police Academy and professor of Terrorism Studies at Leiden University.

== Biography ==
Bakker was born on 20 October 1967 in Leiden, in the Netherlands.

In 1997, Bakker obtained a PhD degree with his thesis on minority conflicts in Slovakia and Hungary. He graduated from Groningen University, where he studied Economic Geography.

Before joining the Police Academy he was the director of the Centre for Terrorism and Counterterrorism (CTC) of Leiden University Campus The Hague, and director of the Institute of Security and Global Affairs.

From 2007 to 2011, Bakker was a fellow at the Netherlands Institute of International Relations ‘Clingendael’. He was head of the Security and Conflict Programme.

== Current roles ==
Bakker is head of the knowledge and research department of the Netherlands Police Academy and professor of Terrorism Studies at the Leiden University.

He is also a member of the editorial board of several journals, including the Journal of Strategic Security, and Internationale Spectator.

He as of 2021 is the lead instructor of the MOOC " Terrorism and Counterterrorism: Comparing Theory and Practice" on Coursera. and guest lecturer at the joint training institute of the Dutch judicial system and the Public Prosecution Service, SSR (Studiecentrum Rechtspleging), the Institute for Safety (the Instituut Fysieke Veiligheid, or IFV), as well as Leiden University's Centre for Professional Learning.

Bakker’s research interests include radicalisation and jihadi terrorism, characteristics of (jihadi) terrorists dealing with (fear of) terrorism and its policy implications, security issues in general, as well as the world of policing.

== Selected publications ==
Key publications include:

- Edwin Bakker (1997). Minority Conflicts in Slovakia and Hungary?. Labyrinth Publ. ISBN 978-90-72591-42-5.
- Edwin Bakker (2006). Jihadi Terrorists in Europe: Their Characteristics and the Circumstances in which They Joined the Jihad; an Exploratory Study. Clingendael Inst. ISBN 978-90-5031-113-7.
- Edwin Bakker; Leen Boer (2007). The evolution of Al-Qaedaism: its ideology, its terrorists, and its appeal. Netherlands Institute of International Relations, Clingendael. ISBN 978-90-5031-122-9.
- Rethinking European Security, Principles & Practice. Special issue of Security and Human Rights, Leiden, Martinus Nijhoff Publishers, vol. 21, 2010, no. 1, [with Arie Bloed, Sabine Machl and Wolfgang Zellner]
- Preventing Lone Wolf Terrorism: some CR Approaches Addressed, Perspectives of Terrorism, Vol. V, 2011, no. 5-6 [with Beatrice de Graaf].
- The Muslim Brotherhood in Europe. The challenge of transnationalization, London: Hurst Publishers, 2012, [with Roel Meijer]
- Terrorism and Counterterrorism Studies: Comparing Theory and Practice. Leiden: Leiden UP, 2015
