= 1912–13 Netherlands Football League Championship =

Netherl. Football Championship
- Season: 1912–1913
- Champions: Sparta Rotterdam (4th title)

The Netherlands Football League Championship 1912–1913 was contested by eighteen teams participating in two divisions. The national champion would be determined by a play-off featuring the winners of the eastern and western football division of the Netherlands. Sparta Rotterdam won this year's championship by beating Vitesse Arnhem 2-1 and 2–1.

== New entrant ==
Eerste Klasse East:

- HVV Tubantia

== Divisions ==
=== Eerste Klasse East ===
Pos	Team	Pld	W	D	L	GF	GA	GD	Pts	Qualification
1	Vitesse	14	10	1	3	34	12	+22	21	Qualified for Championship play-off
2	RKVV Wilhelmina	14	8	3	3	21	17	+4	19	Moved to Eerste Klasse South
3	Koninklijke UD	14	8	1	5	37	18	+19	17	
4	Quick Nijmegen	14	8	1	5	18	18	0	17	
5	HVV Tubantia	14	6	1	7	27	23	+4	13	
6	Go Ahead	14	2	6	6	13	23	−10	10	
7	GVC Wageningen	14	4	1	9	16	28	−12	9	
8	EFC PW 1885	14	2	2	10	15	42	−27	6	

Source: rsssf.com

=== Eerste Klasse West ===
Pos	Team	Pld	W	D	L	GF	GA	GD	Pts	Qualification
1	Sparta Rotterdam	18	14	3	1	57	16	+41	31	Qualified for Championship play-off
2	DFC	18	14	2	2	65	22	+43	30	
3	HFC Haarlem	18	8	4	6	39	29	+10	20	
4	HVV Den Haag	18	9	2	7	48	38	+10	20	
5	HBS Craeyenhout	18	6	5	7	28	37	−9	17	
6	Koninklijke HFC	18	7	1	10	44	47	−3	15	
7	HV & CV Quick	18	6	3	9	29	39	−10	15	
8	VOC	18	5	4	9	30	31	−1	14	
9	AFC Ajax	18	6	2	10	22	47	−25	14	
10	CVV Velocitas	18	1	2	15	24	80	−56	4	Moved to Eerste Klasse South

Source: rsssf.com

=== Championship play-off ===
Team 1	Agg.	Team 2	1st leg	2nd leg
Vitesse	2–4	Sparta Rotterdam	1–2	1–2

Sparta Rotterdam won the championship.
