= Edwin Godee =

Dutch footballer

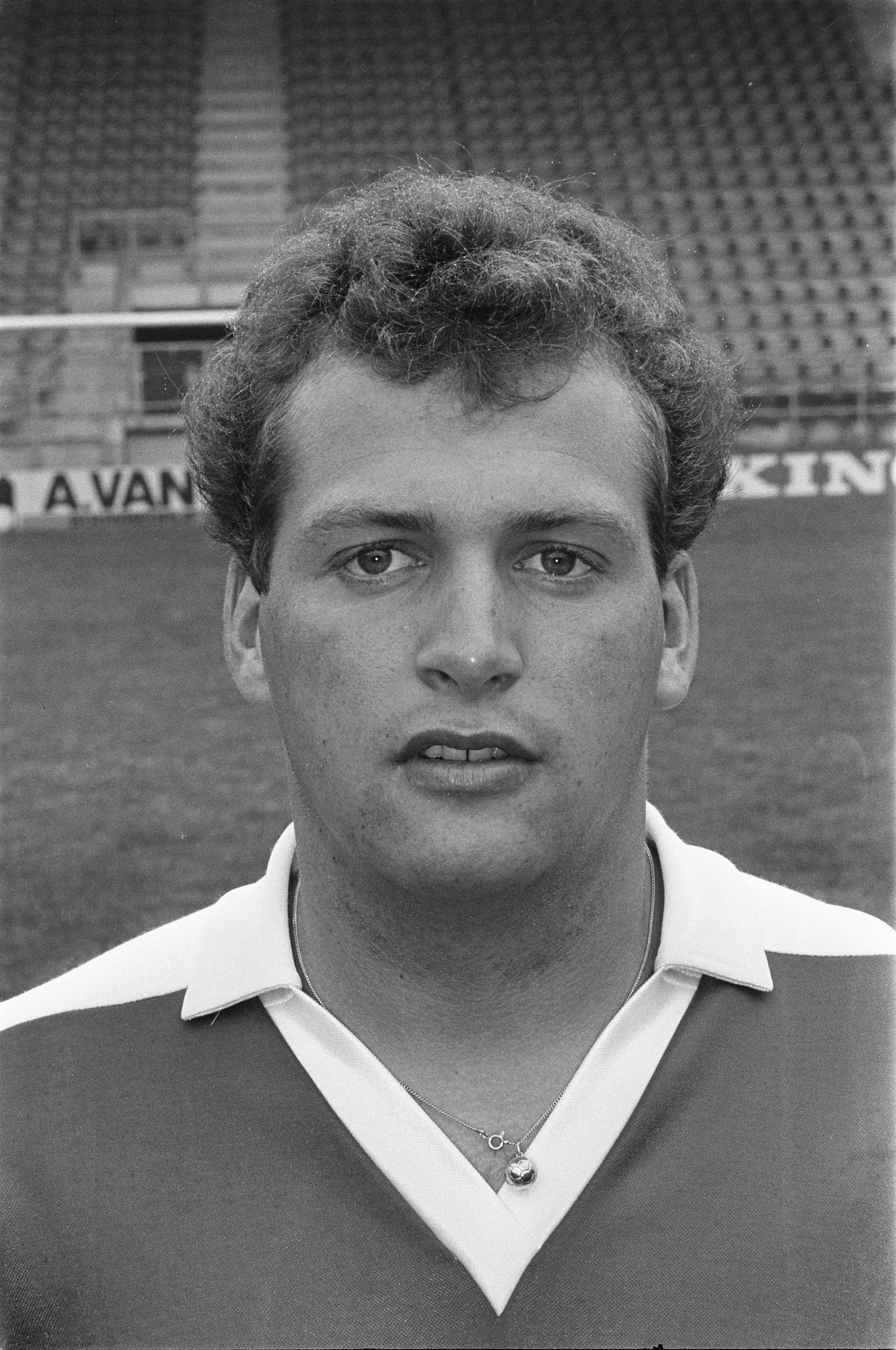

Personal information
- Date of birth: 26 September 1964 (age 62)
- Place of birth: Utrecht, Netherlands
- Position: Midfielder

Youth career
- Minerva
- Utrecht
- Ajax

Senior career*
| Years | Team | Apps | (Gls) |
| 1982–1984 | Ajax | 3 | (1) |
| 1984–1986 | Utrecht | 58 | (2) |
| 1986–1991 | Willem II | 158 | (22) |
| 1991–1999 | De Graafschap | 228 | (34) |
| 1999–2001 | Heracles | 50 | (8) |
| Total | | 497 | (67) |

International career
| 1981 | Netherlands U17 | 6 | (5) |
| 1981-1983 | Netherlands U19 | 16 | (2) |
| 1984-1985 | Netherlands U21 | 7 | (0) |
- * Club domestic league appearances and goals

Edwin Godee (born 26 September 1964) is a Dutch retired professional footballer.

== Club career ==
He played club football for Ajax, FC Utrecht, Willem II, De Graafschap and Heracles.

== International career ==
Godee played 7 games for the Netherlands national under-21 football team and 16 for the U19s. He was a member of the Dutch squad at the 1983 FIFA World Youth Championship.

== Personal life ==
His son Joey Godee is also a former professional player. After retiring, Godee managed a moving company.

== Honours ==
FC Utrecht

- KNVB Cup: 1984–85
