= Wim Volkers =

Dutch footballer and coach

Personal information
- Full name: Willem Frederick Volkers
- Date of birth: 3 October 1899
- Place of birth: Amsterdam, Netherlands
- Date of death: 4 January 1990 (aged 90)
- Place of death: Amsterdam, Netherlands
- Position: Striker

Senior career*
Years	Team	Apps	(Gls)
1923–1936	Ajax	265	(129)

International career
1924–1932	Netherlands	7	(2)

Managerial career
- 1941–1942: Ajax
- * Club domestic league appearances and goals

Willem Frederik Volkers (3 October 1899 – 4 January 1990) was a Dutch football player and coach.

== Career statistics ==
=== International goals ===
#	Date	Venue	Opponent	Score	Result	Competition
1.	2 November 1924	Olympic Stadium, Amsterdam, Netherlands	South Africa	2-1	Win	Friendly
2.	29 March 1925	Olympic Stadium, Amsterdam, Netherlands	Germany	2-1	Win	Friendly
Correct as of 1 June 2012
