= Hein Delsen =

Dutch footballer (1895–1954)

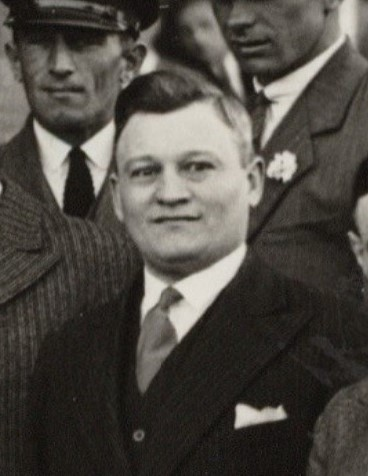
- Hein Delsen in 1931

Personal information
- Full name: Hendrik Delsen
- Date of birth: 13 January 1895
- Place of birth: Nieuwer-Amstel, Netherlands
- Date of death: 13 November 1954 (aged 59)
- Place of death: Amsterdam, Netherlands
- Height: 1.58 m (5 ft 2 1/2 in)
- Position: Inside forward

Senior career*
Years	Team	Apps	(Gls)
1914–1916	NOS Amsterdam		
1916–1918	AFC		
1918–1924	Ajax	86	(26)

International career
1921–1922	Netherlands	3	(0)
- * Club domestic league appearances and goals

Hendrik (Hein) Delsen (13 January 1895 – 13 November 1954) was a Dutch footballer. He played in three matches for the Netherlands national football team from 1921 to 1922.

== Personal life ==
Hein was born in Nieuwer-Amstel, the son of Hendrik Delsen and Johanna Maria Kok. In 1917, he married Lena Elisabeth van de Linde. They had a daughter, Lena.

His younger brother, Coen Delsen, was also a football player and trainer.

== Career statistics ==
Club	Season	League		KNVB Cup		Total	
Club	Season	Apps	Goals	Apps	Goals	Apps	Goals
Ajax	1918–19	26	12	—		26	12
Ajax	1920–21	21	6	—		21	6
Ajax	1921–22	18	3	—		18	3
Ajax	1922–23	13	3	—		13	3
Ajax	1923–24	5	2	—		5	2
Ajax	1924–25	1	0	2	0	3	0
Ajax	1925–26	2	0	—		2	0
Total		86	26	2	0	88	26

== Sources ==
- Vermeer, Evert; van Hoof, Marcelle (1999). Ajax 100 Jaar Jubileumboek 1900-2000 (in Dutch). Amsterdam: Luitingh-Sijthoff. ISBN 90-245-3497-6.
