= Henk Mulders =

Dutch footballer

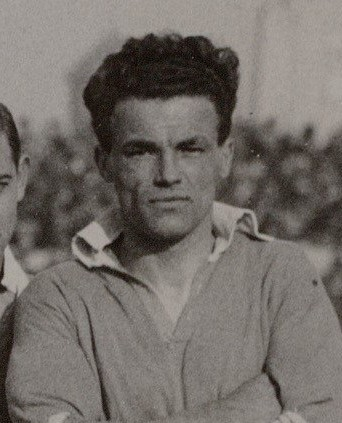
- Henk Mulders in 1930

Personal information
- Full name: Hendrik Cornelis Mulders
- Date of birth: 1 June 1904
- Place of birth: Rotterdam, Netherlands
- Date of death: 13 May 1978 (aged 73)
- Height: 1.73 m (5 ft 8 in)
- Position: Left winger

Senior career*
Years	Team	Apps	(Gls)
1929–1936	Ajax	136	(64)

International career
1930–1933	Netherlands	2	(1)
- * Club domestic league appearances and goals

Hendrik Cornelis (Henk) Mulders (1 June 1904 – 13 May 1978) was a Dutch footballer. He played in two matches for the Netherlands national football team from 1930 to 1933.

== Personal life ==
Henk was born in Rotterdam, the son of Cornelis Mulders and Hendrika Gerritdina Ridderhof. He was married to Catharina Afiena Cupido and had two children.

== Career statistics ==
Club	Season	League		KNVB Cup		Total	
Club	Season	Apps	Goals	Apps	Goals	Apps	Goals
Ajax	1929–30	13	4	2	0	15	4
Ajax	1930–31	18	6	—		18	6
Ajax	1931–32	20	15	?	?	20	15
Ajax	1932–33	16	9	—		16	9
Ajax	1933–34	28	14	—		28	14
Ajax	1934–35	21	7	?	?	21	7
Ajax	1935–36	20	9	1	1	21	10
Total		136	64	3	1	139	65

== Sources ==
- Vermeer, Evert; van Hoof, Marcelle (1999). Ajax 100 Jaar Jubileumboek 1900-2000 (in Dutch). Amsterdam: Luitingh-Sijthoff. ISBN 90-245-3497-6.
