= Theo Schetters =

Dutch footballer

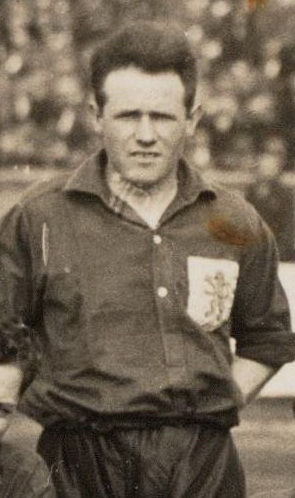

Personal information
- Full name: Matheus Jacobus Schetters
- Date of birth: 21 April 1896
- Place of birth: Amsterdam, Netherlands
- Date of death: 7 December 1973 (aged 77)
- Place of death: Amsterdam, Netherlands

International career
Years	Team	Apps	(Gls)
1927	Netherlands	1	(0)

Theo Schetters (21 April 1896 – 7 December 1973) was a Dutch footballer. He played in one match for the Netherlands national football team in 1927.
