= Joop van Dort =

Dutch footballer and manager

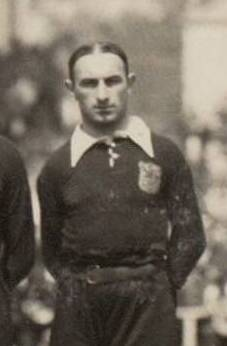
- van Dort (1920)

Personal information
- Full name: Jan Leendert van Dort
- Date of birth: 25 May 1889
- Place of birth: Heemstede, Netherlands
- Date of death: 1 April 1967 (aged 77)
- Place of death: Leiden, Netherlands
- Position: Striker

Senior career*
Years	Team	Apps	(Gls)
1912–1922	Ajax	119	(66)
1922–1926	Vitesse	57	(27)

International career
1920	Netherlands	5	(0)

Managerial career
- 1922-1924: Vitesse
- * Club domestic league appearances and goals

Olympic medal record

Men's football

Representing the Netherlands
Bronze medal – third place	1920 Antwerp	Team competition

Jan ("Joop") Leendert van Dort (25 May 1889 in Heemstede – 1 April 1967 in Leiden) was a football player from the Netherlands, who represented his home country at the 1920 Summer Olympics. There he won the bronze medal with the Netherlands national football team.

== Club career ==
He played over 200 games for Ajax and joined Vitesse in 1922.

== International career ==
Van Dort made his debut for the Netherlands in an April 1920 friendly match against Denmark and obtained a total number of five caps, scoring no goals.
