= 1910–11 Netherlands Football League Championship =

Netherl. Football Championship
- Season: 1910–1911
- Champions: Sparta Rotterdam (2nd title)

The Netherlands Football League Championship 1910–1911 was contested by seventeen teams participating in two divisions. The national champion would be determined by a play-off featuring the winners of the eastern and western football division of the Netherlands. Sparta Rotterdam won this year's championship by beating GVC Wageningen 1-0 and 5–1.

== New entrants ==
Eerste Klasse West:

- VOC
- Bredania/'t Zesde (playing in the eastern division last season)

== Divisions ==
=== Eerste Klasse East ===
Pos	Team	Pld	W	D	L	GF	GA	GD	Pts	Qualification
1	GVC Wageningen	10	7	1	2	22	7	+15	15	Qualified for Championship play-off
2	Quick Nijmegen	10	7	1	2	22	8	+14	15	
3	Vitesse Arnhem	10	5	1	4	10	16	−6	11	
4	RKVV Wilhelmina	10	3	2	5	12	16	−4	8	
5	EFC PW 1885	10	3	1	6	11	15	−4	7	
6	U.D.	10	1	2	7	9	24	−15	4	

Source: rsssf.com

=== Eerste Klasse West ===
Pos	Team	Pld	W	D	L	GF	GA	GD	Pts	Qualification
1	Sparta Rotterdam	20	14	3	3	68	21	+47	31	Qualified for Championship play-off
2	VOC	20	10	8	2	47	27	+20	28	
3	CVV Velocitas	20	12	3	5	47	27	+20	27	
4	HBS Craeyenhout	20	9	5	6	39	34	+5	23	
5	Koninklijke HFC	20	8	6	6	36	34	+2	22	
6	DFC	20	9	2	9	32	39	−7	20	
7	HFC Haarlem	20	6	7	7	34	39	−5	19	
8	HVV Den Haag	20	4	9	7	39	39	0	17	
9	HV & CV Quick	20	5	7	8	32	42	−10	17	
10	USV Hercules	20	2	4	14	20	53	−33	8	Not participating next season.
11	Bredania/'t Zesde	20	2	4	14	13	52	−39	8	Not participating next season.

Source: rsssf.com

=== Championship play-off ===
Team 1	Agg.	Team 2	1st leg	2nd leg
GVC Wageningen	1–6	Sparta Rotterdam	0–1	1–5

Sparta Rotterdam won the championship.
