= Jan de Boer (footballer, born 1898) =

Dutch footballer (1898–1988)

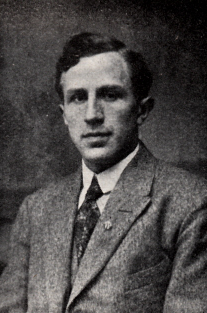

Personal information
- Full name: Jan de Boer Jr.
- Date of birth: 29 August 1898
- Place of birth: Amsterdam, Netherlands
- Date of death: 1 July 1988 (aged 89)
- Place of death: Amsterdam, Netherlands
- Height: 1.79 m (5 ft 10 1/2 in)
- Position: Goalkeeper

Youth career
- 1911–1920: Ajax

Senior career*
Years	Team	Apps	(Gls)
1920–1933	Ajax	195	(0)

International career
1923–1924	Netherlands	5	(0)
- * Club domestic league appearances and goals

Jan de Boer (29 August 1898 – 1 July 1988) was a Dutch association football player, who played as a goalkeeper for Ajax and the Netherlands national team.

== Club career ==
Growing up in Amsterdam, De Boer signed up with local club Ajax in 1911, joining the club's youth ranks at 13 years of age. Nine years later, under coach Jack Reynolds, De Boer was able to replace former first team goalkeeper Jan Smit in goal. He would become the club's first-choice goalkeeper for the next thirteen years until 1933, amassing a total of 195 caps for Ajax, making him a member of the club's illustrious Club van 100 of most capped players in the club's history. He made his first appearance for Ajax on 19 September 1920, in the 4–1 away loss to De Spartaan, while his final match for Ajax was contested on 26 March 1933 in the 4–3 away win over Sparta Rotterdam.

After 1933 De Boer remained active at Ajax, playing as an outfield player for Ajax 6, one of the club's amateur teams playing in the lower leagues of the Netherlands. In 1942 he was made an Honorary member of the club, and from 1963 to 1973 was a member of the club's board of directors.

== International career ==
De Boer received several call-ups for the Dutch national team, but was only capped a total of five times between 1923 and 1924. He was a part of the Dutch Olympic football team at both the 1924 Summer Olympics and the 1928 Summer Olympics but did not make any appearances for the team at either of the games. He was the back-up goalkeeper for the Netherlands national team behind Gejus van der Meulen until his retirement from the national team in 1932.

== Business career ==
Outside of his football career, De Boer was responsible for the Ajax brand of fire extinguishers, which he helped develop that were later marketed and sold worldwide.

== Honours ==
Ajax

Dutch championship (2): 1930–31, 1931–32
