= Guus Dräger =

Dutch footballer (1917–1989)

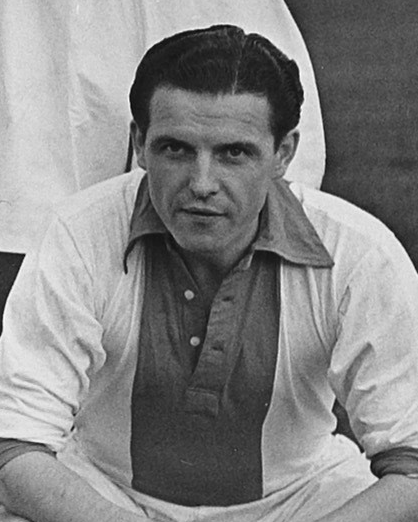
- Guus Dräger, September 1951

Personal information
- Full name: Gustav Karl Dräger
- Date of birth: 14 December 1917
- Place of birth: Amsterdam, Netherlands
- Date of death: May 24, 1989 (aged 71)
- Place of death: Ouderkerk aan de Amstel , Netherlands
- Height: 1.74 m (5 ft 8 1/2 in)
- Position: Right winger

Youth career
- 1923–1936: SDW

Senior career*
Years	Team	Apps	(Gls)
1936–1937	SDW		
1937–1941	DWS		
1941–1951	Ajax	207	(80)
1951–1953	Stormvogels		

International career
1939–1948	Netherlands	13	(5)
- * Club domestic league appearances and goals

Gustav Karl "Guus" Dräger (14 December 1917 – 24 May 1989) was a Dutch association football player, who played as a winger for SDW, DWS, Ajax, IJ.V.V. Stormvogels and for the Netherlands national team.

== Club career ==
Dräger began his football career in the youth ranks of ASC SDW in Amsterdam, playing one season before moving to AFC DWS in 1937 at the age of 19. In 1941 Dräger transferred to AFC Ajax where he played in 207 matches and scoring 80 goals within a decade (1941–1951). He ended his career in 1953 with IJ.V.V. Stormvogels, playing amateur football for EVC from Edam afterwards.

In 1961 he became the manager for BFC from Bussum.

== International career ==
He was also a member of the Netherlands national football team. Between 1939 and 1948 he played in 13 matches, scoring 5 goals for the Dutch national team. He was also part of the Dutch squad for the 1948 Summer Olympics, but he did not play in any matches.
