= Gerrit Fischer =

Dutch footballer

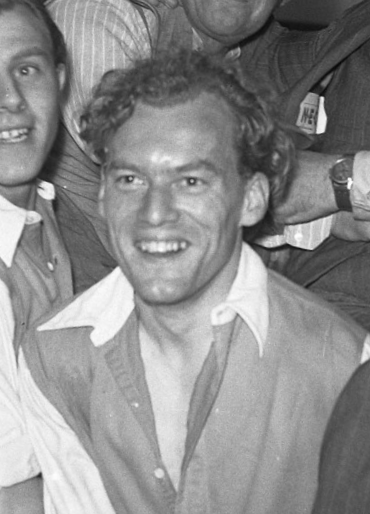

Personal information
- Full name: Gerrit Fischer
- Date of birth: 28 August 1916
- Place of birth: Amsterdam, Netherlands
- Date of death: 22 November 1984 (aged 68)
- Place of death: Amsterdam, Netherlands
- Position: Right winger

Youth career
- 1932–1934: Ajax

Senior career*
Years	Team	Apps	(Gls)
1934–1950	Ajax	240	(97)
- * Club domestic league appearances and goals

Gerrit Fischer (28 August 1916 – 22 November 1984) was a Dutch footballer who played for Ajax as a right winger.

== Club career ==
=== Ajax ===
Fischer was discovered at a school football match at the age of sixteen, by Ajax coach Jack Reynolds, after which he joined the youth ranks of the Amsterdam club. He made his debut for the first team at the age of eighteen in a home match against Xerxes on 16 September 1934. He went on to play for the first team of Ajax for 16 years. Between 1936 and 1938, he had temporarily lost his starting position to Jan Stam, but throughout his career he always remained of great value to the club. The last match of his career was in 1950, a home match against SV Limburgia, which Ajax lost 6–0. In total Fischer played in 240 matches for Ajax, scoring 97 goals. Besides his goal-scoring ability, Fischer played a big role in setting up the goals for the Piet van Reenen who is the club's all-time leading goal scorer with 273 goals. Fischer himself is the club's 16th highest scoring player of all-time for the club.

After his retirement from football, he stayed active behind the scenes at Ajax.

== Honours ==
=== Club ===
AFC Ajax

- National Championship: 1936–37, 1938–39, 1946–47
- Dutch Cup: 1942–43
