= André de Kruijff =

Dutch footballer

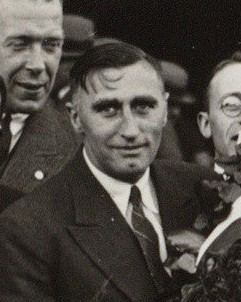
- André de Kruijff in 1931

Personal information
- Full name: Andries Johannes de Kruijff
- Date of birth: 9 April 1895
- Place of birth: Amsterdam, Netherlands
- Date of death: 29 November 1964 (aged 69)
- Place of death: Amstelveen, Netherlands
- Height: 1.80 m (5 ft 11 in)
- Position: Midfielder

Youth career
- 1909–1916: Ajax

Senior career*
Years	Team	Apps	(Gls)
1916–1927	Ajax	95	(3)

International career
1921	Netherlands	1	(0)
- * Club domestic league appearances and goals

Andries Johannes (André) de Kruijff (9 April 1895 – 29 November 1964) was a Dutch footballer. He played in one match for the Netherlands national football team in 1921.

== Personal life ==
André was born in Amsterdam, the son of Dirk Willem de Kruijff and Francisca Henriëtta Maria Borghols. He was married to Johanna Geertruida Smit and had 4 children (Anneke de Kruijff, Rob de Kruijff and the twins Nelleke and Riet de Kruijff.

== Career statistics ==
Club	Season	League		KNVB Cup		Total	
Club	Season	Apps	Goals	Apps	Goals	Apps	Goals
Ajax	1916–17	1	0	2	1	3	1
Ajax	1917–18	3	0	?	?	3	0
Ajax	1919–20	14	0	—		14	0
Ajax	1920–21	22	1	0	0	22	1
Ajax	1921–22	15	0	—		15	0
Ajax	1922–23	17	1	—		17	1
Ajax	1923–24	4	0	—		4	0
Ajax	1924–25	17	1	—		17	1
Ajax	1926–27	2	0	—		2	0
Total		95	3	2	1	97	4

== Sources ==
- Evert Vermeer; Marcelle van Hoof (1999). Ajax 100 Jaar Jubileumboek 1900-2000 (in Dutch). Amsterdam: Luitingh-Sijthoff. ISBN 90-245-3497-6.
