= Piet van der Kuil =

Dutch association football player

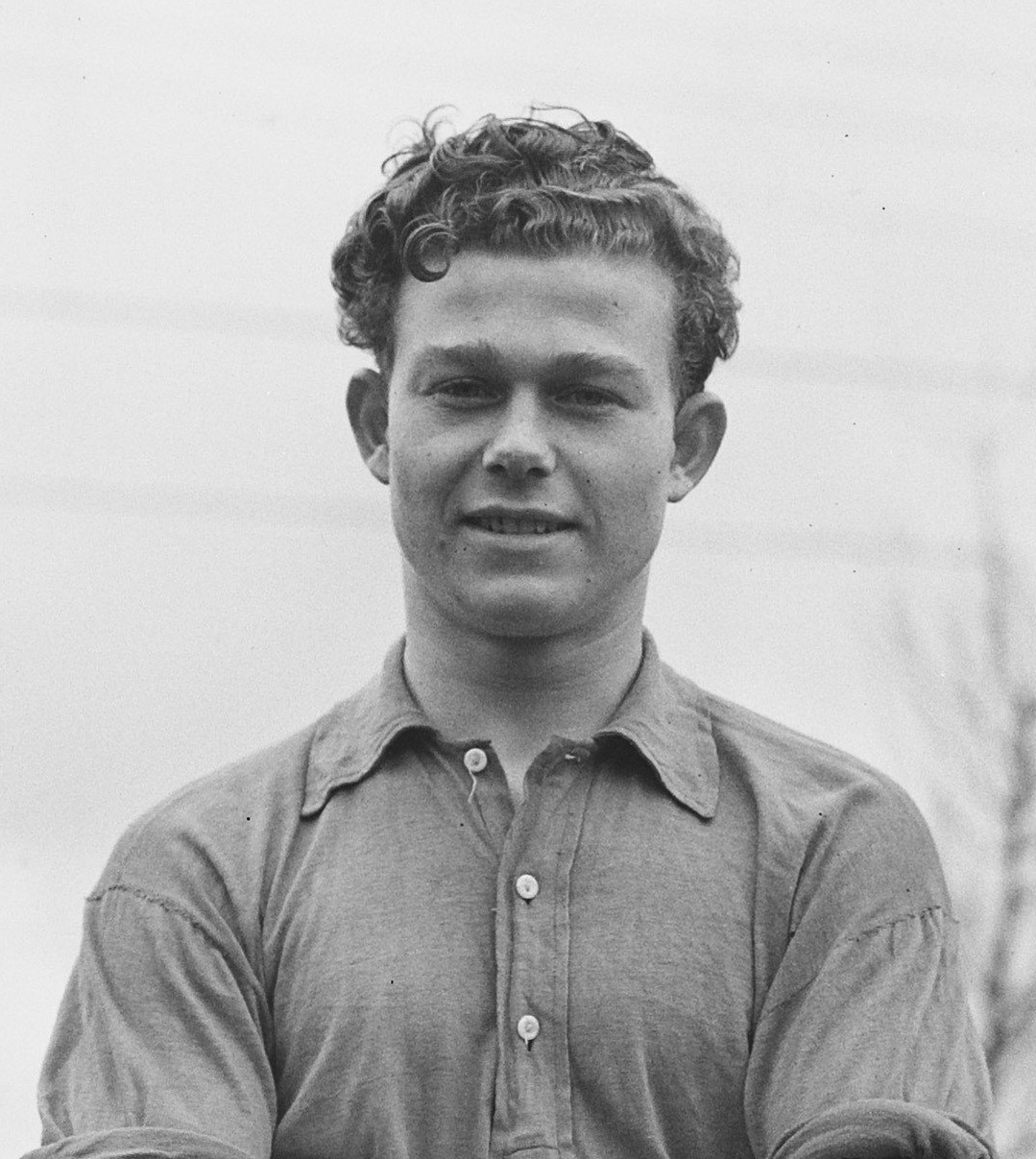

Personal information
- Date of birth: 10 February 1933 (age 93)
- Place of birth: Velsen, Netherlands
- Position: Forward

Senior career*
Years	Team	Apps	(Gls)
1947–1955	VSV		
1955–1959	Ajax	124	(53)
1959–1963	PSV	115	(40)
1963–1964	Blauw-Wit	23	(1)
1964–1966	Telstar	38	(8)

International career
1952–1962	Netherlands	40	(9)
- * Club domestic league appearances and goals

Piet van der Kuil (born 10 February 1933 in Velsen) is a former Dutch footballer and the owner of a football school in Velsen. He was part of the Dutch squad at the 1952 Summer Olympics.

== Honours ==
Ajax

- Eredivisie: 1956–57

PSV

- Eredivisie: 1962–63
