= Theo Brokmann =

Dutch footballer

Theo Brokmann Sr.
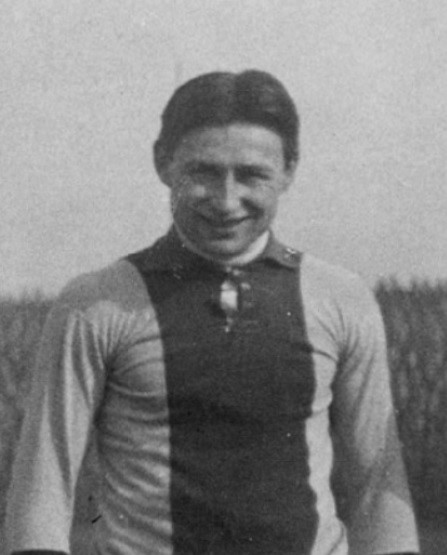

Personal information
- Full name: Theodorus Johannes Franciscus Brokmann
- Date of birth: 19 September 1893
- Place of birth: Amsterdam, Netherlands
- Date of death: 28 August 1956 (aged 62)
- Place of death: Amsterdam, Netherlands
- Height: 1.76 m (5 ft 9 in)
- Position: Forward

Youth career
- V.V. Steeds Voorwaarts

Senior career*
Years	Team	Apps	(Gls)
–1912	Steeds Voorwaarts		
1912–1925	Ajax	175	(78)

International career
1919	Netherlands	1	(1)
- * Club domestic league appearances and goals

Theodorus Johannes Franciscus Brokmann (19 September 1893 – 28 August 1956) was a Dutch footballer who played for Steeds Voorwaarts in the Derde Klasse, and then for Ajax where he played from 1912 to 1925 scoring 78 goals in 175 matches. He also made one appearance for the Netherlands national team where he became the first Ajax player to ever score for the Dutch national team in 1919.

Brokmann was born in Amsterdam, North Holland. He was the father of Theo Brokmann Jr., who also played for Ajax and for the Netherlands national team.

== Club career ==
Brokmann started his career in Amsterdam at Steeds Voorwaarts playing in the Dutch Derde Klasse, before moving to play for Ajax at age 20 in 1912. His debut came a year later, on 19 October 1913 in the club's match against DFC, which Ajax won with a score of 6–1. Brokmann's career with Ajax spanned 11 seasons, with him scoring 78 goals in 175 matches, while helping his club to win the Dutch Championship twice in 1918 and 1919, also winning the Dutch Cup in 1917.

He played his last match for Ajax on 22 February 1925 again in a match against DFC, retiring from football after his Ajax playing career. Brokmann's son, also named Theo, followed his father in playing for Ajax.

== International career ==
Brokmann made his only appearance for the Netherlands national team on 9 June 1919 in a friendly match against Sweden. Two other Ajax players debuted in this match as well, namely Wim Gupffert and Henk Hordijk. Brokmann was marked with a pocketed ball by Gupffert scoring to help secure the 3–1 victory.

=== International goal ===
#	Date	Venue	Opponent	Score	Result	Competition
1.	9 June 1919	Oude Stadion, Amsterdam, Netherlands	Sweden	1–1	3–1	Friendly

== Retirement and death ==
Five years after retiring as a player Brokmann returned to Ajax to work as the club's bus driver, and later from 1930 to 1950 was the Commissioner of the club.

Brockmann died in 1956 in Amsterdam, after a short illness.

== Honours ==
=== Club ===
Ajax

- Dutch Championship: 1917–18, 1918–19
- Dutch Cup: 1916–17
