= Theo Brokmann Jr. =

Dutch footballer

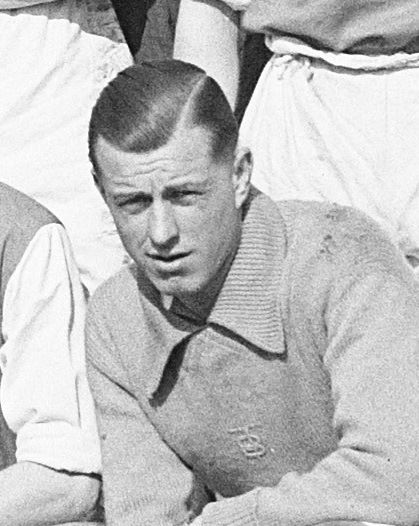

Personal information
- Full name: Theodorus Johannes Franciscus Brokmann
- Date of birth: 3 July 1922
- Place of birth: Amsterdam, The Netherlands
- Date of death: 24 December 2003 (aged 81)
- Place of death: Haarlem, The Netherlands
- Position: Striker

Senior career*
Years	Team	Apps	(Gls)
1939–1951	Ajax	126	(79)
- * Club domestic league appearances and goals

Theodorus Johannes Franciscus Brokmann Jr. (3 July 1922 – 24 December 2003), better known as Theo Brokmann, was a Dutch football player.

== Club career ==
He made his debut for Ajax Amsterdam, after the beginning of World War II. He would be a starting line-up player until 1947 when he was replaced by then 17 year old Rinus Michels. He played 126 matches and scored 79 goals, one more than his father Theo Brokmann Sr. He died in December 2003 at the age of 81.
