= Ajax 5–1 Liverpool =

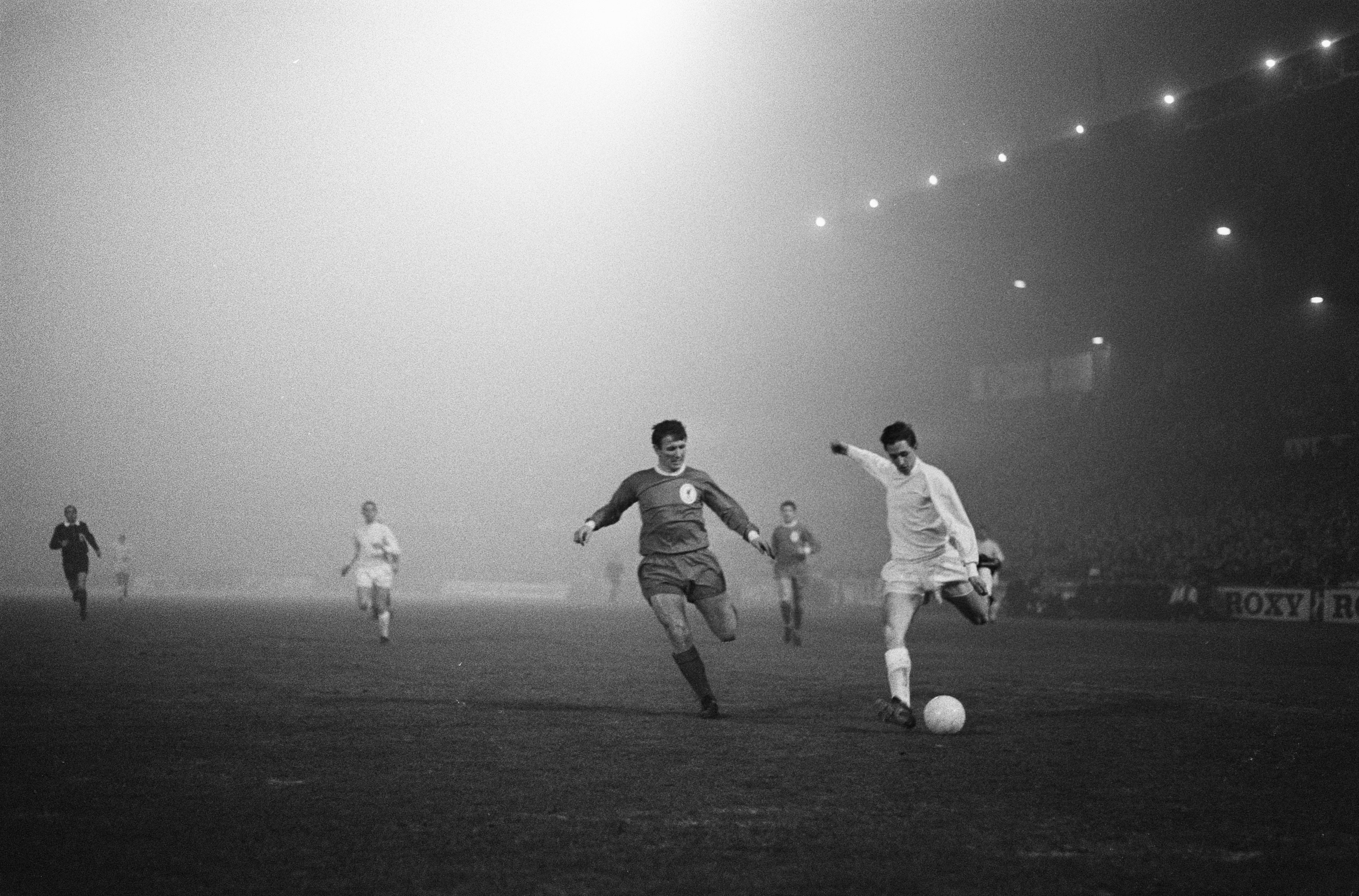
- Johan Cruyff about to strike the ball, with defender Tommy Smith nearby
- Event: 1966–67 European Cup second round first leg
Ajax	Liverpool
(Netherlands)	(England)
5	1
- Date: 7 December 1966
- Venue: Olympic Stadium, Amsterdam
- Referee: Antonio Sbardella (Italy)
- Attendance: 55,722

Ajax 5–1 Liverpool was a football match between Ajax and Liverpool on 7 December 1966 at the Olympic Stadium in Amsterdam, Netherlands. It was the first leg of a second round tie in the 1966–67 European Cup. The match was given the Dutch title De Mistwedstrijd (pronounced [də ˈmɪstˌʋɛt.strɛit]; "The Fog Match") as it was played in dense fog.

Ajax were competing in the European Cup for the third time, they had qualified as winners of the 1965–66 Eredivisie. They were drawn against Turkish team Beşiktaş in the first round, who they beat 4–1 over two-legs. This was Liverpool's second appearance in the European Cup: they had reached the semi-finals during the 1964–65 season, losing to eventual winners Internazionale. Their opponents in the first round were Petrolul Ploiești of Romania, whom they beat 2–0 in a play-off match after the two-leg tie resulted in a 3–3 scoreline.

Watched by a crowd of 55,722, Ajax took the lead in the third minute when Cees de Wolf scored. They extended their lead in the 17th minute courtesy of a Johan Cruyff goal. Two more goals scored by forward Klaas Nuninga meant Ajax had a 4–0 lead at half-time. Ajax further extended their lead in the second half with a goal by Henk Groot. Liverpool only managed a late consolation goal when defender Chris Lawler scored in the 89th minute, and the game ended 5–1 to Ajax. The spectators could not really see much of the match due to the fog's density and at times could only tell by the celebration of the team when a goal was scored.

A 2–2 draw in the second leg meant that Ajax progressed to the quarter-finals courtesy of a 7–3 aggregate victory. They would lose to Czech side Dukla Prague 3–2 over two legs. The match marked the emergence of Ajax in European football, two seasons later they reached the final, but lost 4–1 to Milan. They would go on to win the European Cup three consecutive times in the early 1970s. The match represents Liverpool's record defeat in European competition.

== Background ==
Both teams had qualified for the European Cup by winning their respective national league championships. Ajax won the 1965–66 Eredivisie, finishing seven points ahead of second-placed Feyenoord. Liverpool qualified by winning the 1965–66 Football League First Division, six points ahead of second-placed Leeds United.

Ajax faced Turkish team Beşiktaş in the first round of the European Cup. They won the first leg 2–0 at the Olympic Stadium, courtesy of goals from Piet Keizer and Bennie Muller. The second leg in Turkey finished 2–1 to Ajax, with goals from Keizer and Sjaak Swart. Ajax won the tie 4–1 on aggregate to progress to the second round. Liverpool were drawn against Romanian team Petrolul Ploiești in the first round, and won the first leg at their home ground Anfield, courtesy of goals from Ian St. John and Ian Callaghan. Petrolul Ploiești won the second leg 3–1 in Romania to level the tie at 3–3 after the two matches. The tie would be decided by a play-off match, which Liverpool 2–0 to progress to the second round.

Ajax had little success in European competition prior to their meeting with Liverpool. They had qualified for the European Cup Winners' Cup twice during the 1960–61 and 1961–62 seasons, but did not progress past the first round either time. Liverpool had only participated in European competition during the previous two season, but they had more success than Ajax. Their first season of competition in 1964–65 they reached the semi-finals of the European Cup, losing to eventual winners Internazionale. The following season they reached the final of the European Cup Winners' Cup, however, they lost 2–1 against German team Borussia Dortmund.

Liverpool were among the favourites to win the competition while Ajax were virtually unknown outside of the Netherlands. Liverpool manager Bill Shankly had made a scouting trip to watch Ajax before the match and witnessing them lose to lowly opposition returned confident Liverpool would progress. A few of Liverpool's players, including striker Roger Hunt, were part of England's victorious World Cup campaign in 1966. Ajax were coming out of a poor period, after they had finished in 13th place in the 1964–65 Eredivisie, while the Netherlands national team had yet to make an impression on the international stage. The board of Ajax decided to hire Rinus Michels. He changed the team's formation to a 4–2–4, with an emphasis on passing and possession of the ball. The team showed improvement, winning the Eredivisie in his first full season in charge.

== Match ==
Ajax normally played their home matches at the De Meer Stadion. However, as demand for tickets to watch the match was high, it was switched to the higher-capacity Olympic Stadium. Amsterdam suffered from heavy fog in the 24 hours before the match was due to start, and with the fog not abating before kick-off, it was debated whether to go ahead with the match. One option was to postpone the match, which Liverpool manager Bill Shankly favoured. He was less keen on the match being replayed the next day as Liverpool were scheduled to face Manchester United in the next few days. The referee Antonio Sbardella decided to go ahead with the match, despite visibility reportedly being down to 50 yards (46 m).

=== First half ===
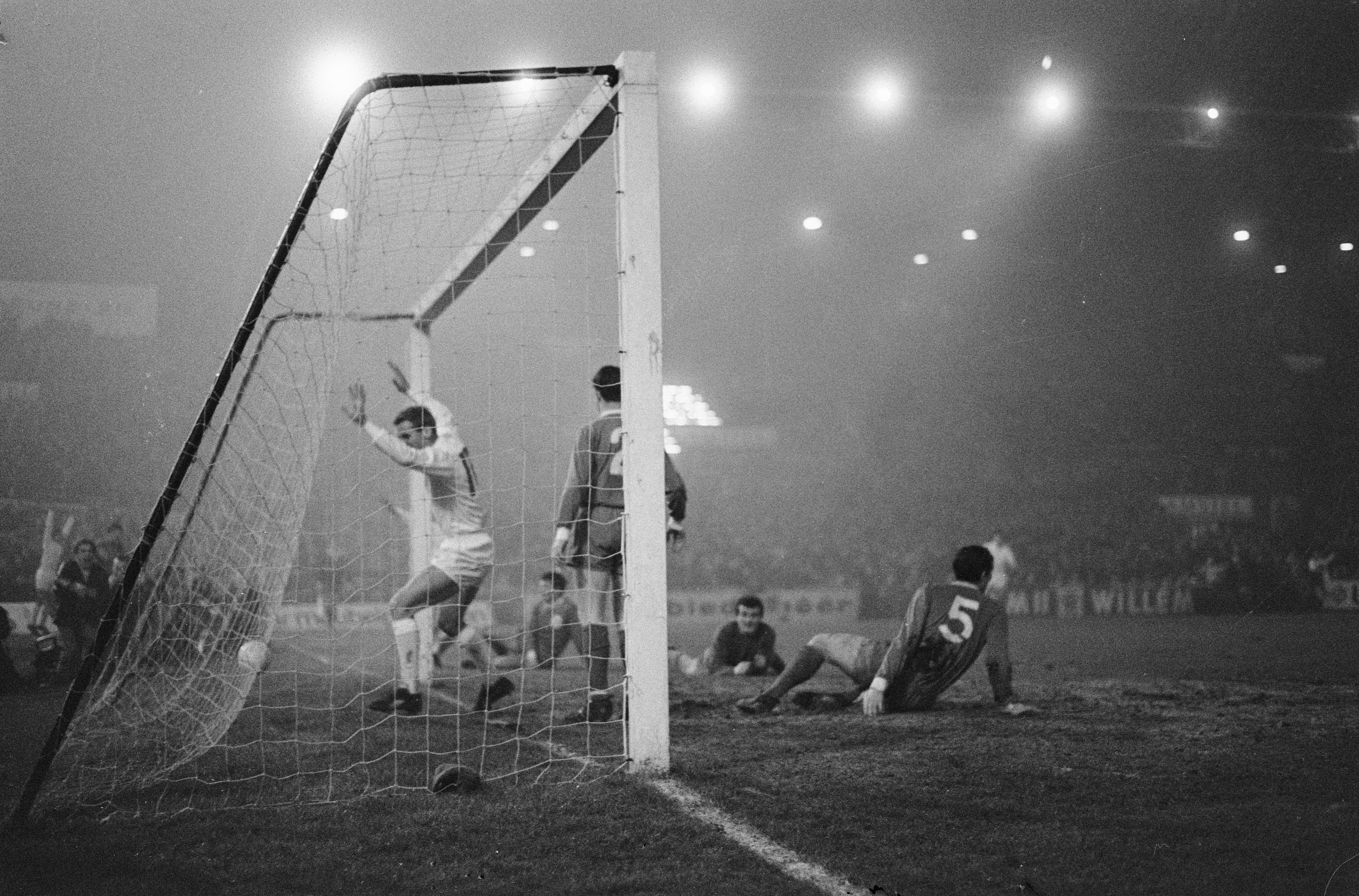
Klaas Nuninga scoring Ajax's fourth goal.

Ajax opened the scoring in the third minute when Cees de Wolf, who was making his debut for Ajax, scored. A throw-in by Cruyff was headed into the air, Liverpool goalkeeper Tommy Lawrence came to collect the ball. Realising he could not reach it, he moved back towards his goal, but de Wolf outjumped defender Chris Lawler to head the ball into the Liverpool goal. The conditions were so poor, that the crowd celebrated in stages. Those closest to the goal celebrated immediately, while those at the other end of the stadium reacted to these celebrations. Liverpool striker Hunt had a chance to score in the 12th minute, but his shot was saved by Ajax goalkeeper Gert Bals. Following the goal Ajax continued to attack, midfielder Sjaak Swart ran past three Liverpool players before passing the ball to Klaas Nuninga, whose shot was saved by Liverpool goalkeeper Lawrence. However, Lawrence dropped the ball near Johan Cruyff, who scored to give Ajax a 2–0 lead.

The conditions were so bad that when Liverpool coach Bob Paisley came onto the pitch to attend to an injured player, Shankly entered as well. He managed to give instructions to his players before he was spotted by the officials and ordered off the field. Ajax player Wim Suurbier was carried off with a damaged ankle midway through the first half. He returned to the pitch, but suffered from a limp. Ajax extended their lead in the 39th minute. Liverpool defender Tommy Smith fouled Cruyff outside the Liverpool penalty area. The subsequent free-kick taken by Frits Soetekouw was not cleared by the Liverpool defence and the ball rebounded to Nuninga, who scored to give Ajax a 3–0 lead. The conditions did not only affect the Liverpool players. Towards the end of the first half, the referee blew his whistle. Swart, assuming that he had signalled half-time began to walk off the pitch, was stopped by a steward who pointed out that the match was still ongoing. He re-entered the pitch, received the ball and crossed the ball for Nuninga, who scored to make it 4–0.

=== Second half ===
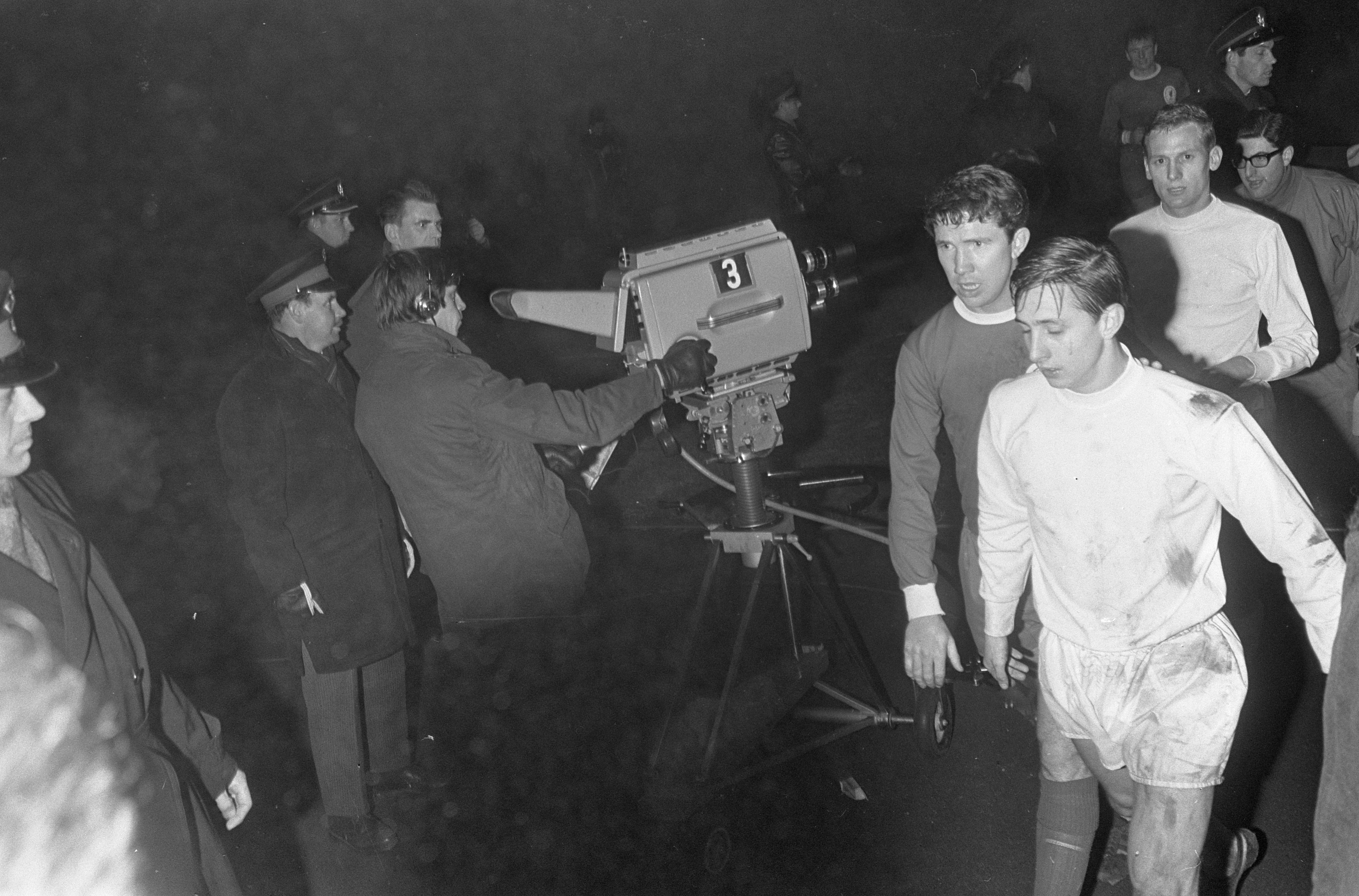
Johan Cruyff, Chris Lawler and Klaas Nuninga heading off the pitch after the final result.Tommy Smith is in the background

Liverpool came out in the second half determined to atone for their first-half performance. They forced Ajax into their own half of the pitch for majority of the second half but were unable to make their advantage count. Smith had a chance to score 25 yards (23 m) from the Ajax goal, but his shot was saved by Bals. Defender Ron Yeats also had a chance to score in the 61st minute, but his header was stopped by Bals. A minute later Smith was cautioned for a foul on Nuninga and Ajax's Bennie Muller was also booked in the 70th minute.

Liverpool had another chance to score in the 73rd minute, but Geoff Strong's shot following a corner went over the crossbar. Ajax extended their lead towards the end of the half when they counter-attacked and scored courtesy of Groot. Liverpool managed to score in the last minute through Lawler, but they were unable to score any further goals and lost the match 5–1.

=== Details ===
7 December 1966
20:15 CET

Ajax (Netherlands)	5–1	(England) Liverpool
De Wolf 3'; Cruyff 17'; Nuninga 38', 42'; Groot 75'	Report	Lawler 89'

Olympic Stadium, Amsterdam
Attendance: 55,722
Referee: Antonio Sbardella (Italy)

Ajax	Liverpool

GK	1	(Netherlands) Gert Bals
RB	2	(Netherlands) Wim Suurbier
CB	3	(Netherlands) Tonny Pronk
CB	4	(Netherlands) Frits Soetekouw (c)
LB	5	(Netherlands) Theo van Duivenbode
RH	6	(Netherlands) Henk Groot
LH	7	(Netherlands) Bennie Muller	(yellow card) 70'
RW	8	(Netherlands) Sjaak Swart
IR	9	(Netherlands) Johan Cruyff
IL	10	(Netherlands) Klaas Nuninga
LW	11	(Netherlands) Cees de Wolf
Manager:
(Netherlands) Rinus Michels

GK	1	(Scotland) Tommy Lawrence
RB	2	(England) Chris Lawler
IL	3	(Scotland) Bobby Graham
CB	4	(England) Tommy Smith	(yellow card) 62'
CB	5	(Scotland) Ron Yeats (c)
LB	6	(Scotland) Willie Stevenson
RW	7	(England) Ian Callaghan
IR	8	(England) Roger Hunt
RH	9	(Scotland) Ian St. John
LH	10	(England) Geoff Strong
LW	11	(England) Peter Thompson
Manager:
(Scotland) Bill Shankly

== Aftermath ==
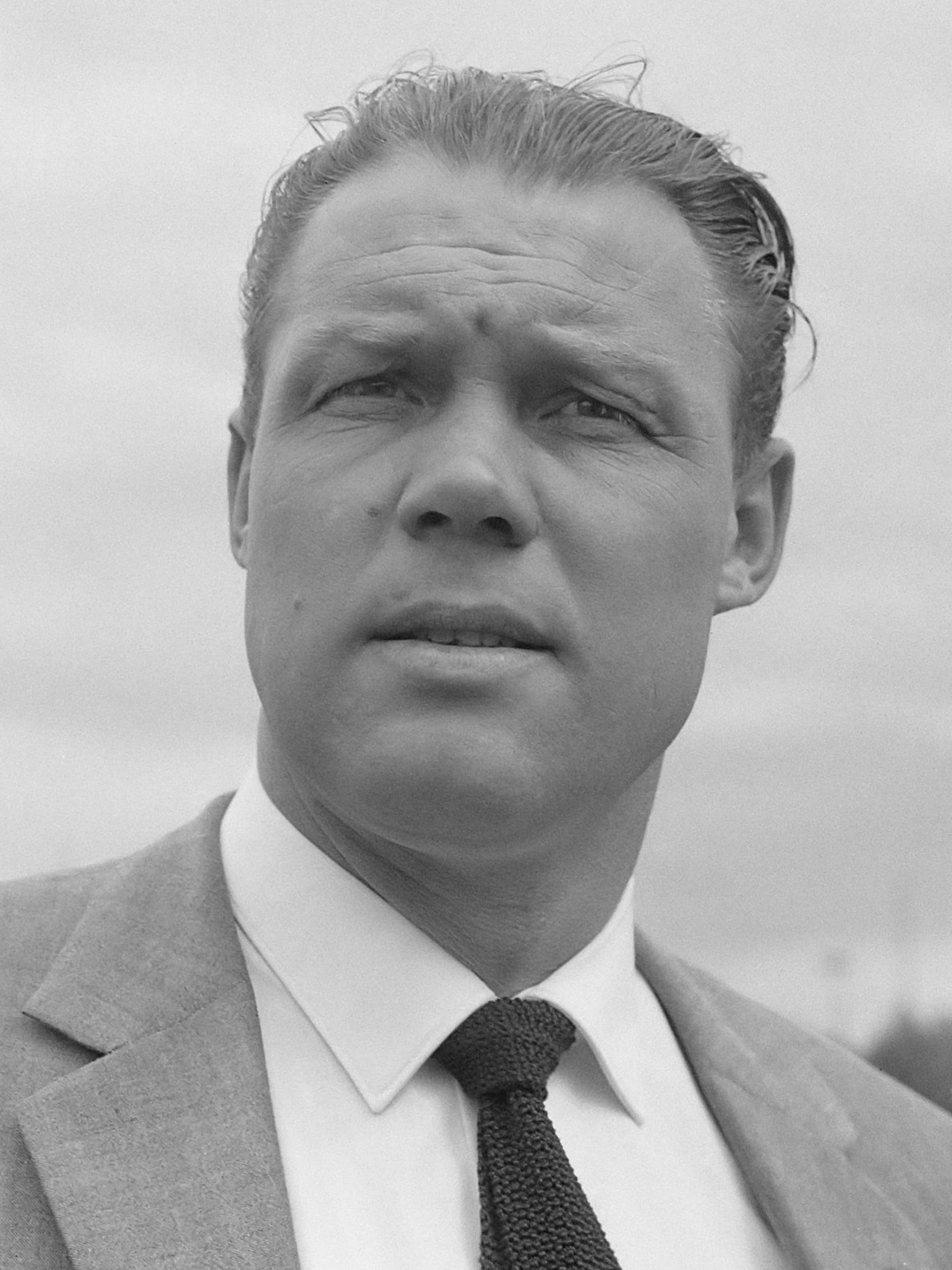
Ajax manager Rinus Michels saw Ajax's victory as evidence that they could compete against Europe's best teams.

Following the first leg, Shankly was adamant that Liverpool would still progress: "This tie is by no means over yet. We will win easily. We will smash in at least seven goals. This was ridiculous. Ajax played defensive football on their own ground. We never play well against defensive teams." Such was the shock at the result that Shankly's claim was taken seriously. The defeat convinced Shankly that adopting Ajax's patient, passing style was the key to success in Europe. The defeat is still Liverpool's record defeat in European competition. Michels was worried that Liverpool might adopt aggressive tactics in the second leg: "Our fear is that Liverpool may try to eliminate us through rough play. They showed some of this rough play in the first leg and they will play even harder in front of their own supporters". He also admitted that his side had some luck in the first leg but was adamant they would progress: "There are not many great players in this Liverpool side, but they are all fighters. I agree we had some luck in Amsterdam, but I am sure we will go through."

Liverpool had early chances in the second leg with midfielder Peter Thompson and defender Geoff Strong hitting the frame of the goal. The first half finished goalless, but Ajax opened the scoring in the 49th minute when Cruyff scored. Liverpool striker Hunt equalised a few minutes later, but Liverpool conceded again when Cruyff scored a second goal. Hunt scored towards the end of the match, but they were unable to beat Ajax and the match finished 2–2. They progressed to the quarter-finals courtesy of a 7–3 aggregate victory. During the early stages of the match, there was a crush on the Spion Kop. As fans struggled to see the match due to a low-hanging haze, people at the back pressed forward for a better view. This resulted in supporters at the front being swept off their feet and spilling onto the pitch. Over 200 people were injured, with 31 taken to hospital.

Michels stated that the victory was proof that Ajax could match teams in Europe: "The Liverpool game was for me an important moment to be acknowledged and recognised internationally. Not only the first game, because that could have been an accident – with the weather conditions etc. No, the performance we achieved in Liverpool under bad circumstances – I've never seen such a hectic situation. We drew that game 2–2 and never really had problems. For me, it was the proof that we were at the international level."

Ajax were drawn against Dukla Prague of Czechoslovakia in the quarter-finals. The first leg finished 1–1 in the Netherlands, but Ajax lost the second leg 2–1 at the Stadion Juliska in Prague. Thus, they lost the tie 3–2 on aggregate. Following the match, Michels decided to reshape his team. He moved defender Ton Pronk into midfield and sold his captain Frits Soetekouw, who had scored an own goal in the second leg, to rivals PSV Eindhoven, signing Velibor Vasović from Partizan as his replacement. The changes had the desired effect as Ajax won the Eredivisie four times between 1966 and 1970. They also reached the final of the 1968–69 European Cup, but lost 4–1 to Italian team Milan. The team's style, known as Total Football, would come to fruition in the 1970s as Ajax won three consecutive European Cups from 1971 to 1973. Total Football was also implemented by the Netherlands national football team, who reached the final of the FIFA World Cup in 1974 and 1978, losing on both occasions.

The teams did not meet again until they were drawn together in the 2020–21 UEFA Champions League group stage. Liverpool won both matches 1–0. The teams were drawn together again in the 2022-23 UEFA Champions League group stage, with Liverpool winning both matches again, 2–1 at Anfield and 3–0 at the Johan Cruyff Arena.
