= AFC Ajax–PSV Eindhoven rivalry =

Dutch football rivalry

De Topper
- Location: Netherlands
- Teams: Ajax; PSV
- First meeting: 12 April 1931; Kampioenscompetitie; Ajax 4–2 PSV
- Latest meeting: 5 September 2026; Eredivisie; Ajax 1–3 PSV

Statistics
- Total meetings: 189
- Most wins: Ajax (83)
- Largest victory: Ajax 5–0 PSV; 1964–65 Eredivisie (22 November 1964); Ajax 5–0 PSV; 2021–22 Eredivisie (24 October 2021)

The rivalry between Ajax and PSV, most commonly known as De Topper (sometimes Dé Topper), is one of the main football rivalries of the Netherlands. It is between Ajax, of Amsterdam and PSV, from Eindhoven (two of the traditional Big Three clubs in the Netherlands), and is highly contested. Although not as charged as De Klassieker, the rivalry between the two sides has increased in intensity over the past four decades.

== Honours ==
As of 5 April 2026

Competition	Ajax	PSV
Eredivisie	36	27
KNVB Cup	20	11
Johan Cruyff Shield (Dutch Super Cup)	9	15
National total	65	53
European Cup/UEFA Champions League	4	1
UEFA Cup/UEFA Europa League	1	1
UEFA Conference League	0	0
European Cup Winners' Cup	1	0
UEFA Super Cup	2 (Note: Ajax also won the 1972 European Super Cup, but is considered unofficial by UEFA; hence, only the 1973 and 1995 cups are included)	0
Intercontinental Cup	2	0
International total	10	2
Grand total	75	55

== Statistics (since 1928) ==
As of 5 September 2026

Competition	Matches	Ajax wins	Draws	PSV wins	Ajax goals	PSV goals
Netherlands Football League Championship play-offs (Kampioenscompetitie; until 1955–56)	8	6	0	2	27	16
Eredivisie (since 1956–57)	141	54	30	57	233	236
Eredivisie promotion/relegation playoffs	2	0	1	1	2	4
KNVB Cup	18	10	3	5	32	21
Johan Cruyff Shield	10	5	0	5	16	21
Tournament friendlies	3	2	0	1	6	6
Friendlies	8	6	1	1	29	13
Total	190	83	35	72	345	317

== Results ==
1920s
Fixture	Season	Date	Result	Competition
Ajax v PSV	1928	2 December 1928	4–4	Friendly

1930s
Fixture	Season	Date	Result	Competition
Ajax v PSV	1930	26 December 1930	10–2	Friendly
Ajax v PSV	1930–31	12 April 1931	4–2	Kampioenscompetitie
PSV v Ajax	1930–31	7 June 1931	2–5	Kampioenscompetitie
Ajax v PSV	1931–32	10 April 1932	3–0	Kampioenscompetitie
PSV v Ajax	1931–32	16 May 1932	1–4	Kampioenscompetitie
Ajax v PSV	1934–35	25 December 1934	3–2	Friendly
PSV v Ajax	1934–35	26 May 1935	4–1	Kampioenscompetitie
Ajax v PSV	1934–35	30 May 1935	2–3	Kampioenscompetitie
PSV v Ajax	1936–37	16 August 1936	2–3	Willem II Jubileum Toernooi (friendly)
PSV v Ajax	1936–37	21 March 1937	2–3	Kampioenscompetitie
Ajax v PSV	1936–37	18 April 1937	5–2	Kampioenscompetitie

1940s
Fixture	Season	Date	Result	Competition
PSV v Ajax	1942	8 November 1942	1–2	Friendly
Ajax v PSV	1947	15 September 1947	1–3	Friendly
Ajax v PSV	1949	6 June 1949	5–1	Friendly

1950s
Fixture	Season	Date	Result	Competition
Ajax v PSV	1952	30 April 1952	2–0	Friendly
PSV v Ajax	1956–57	9 December 1956	2–3	Eredivisie
Ajax v PSV	1956–57	14 April 1957	1–0	Eredivisie
Ajax v PSV	1956–57	30 April 1957	2–0	Friendly
PSV v Ajax	1957–58	8 September 1957	0–5	Eredivisie
Ajax v PSV	1957–58	19 January 1958	1–2	Eredivisie
PSV v Ajax	1958–59	5 October 1958	1–1	Eredivisie
Ajax v PSV	1958–59	8 March 1959	1–0	Eredivisie
PSV v Ajax	1959–60	30 August 1959	1–1	Eredivisie
Ajax v PSV	1959–60	3 January 1960	6–2	Eredivisie
PSV v Ajax	1959–60	29 May 1960	2–0	Eredivisie promotion/relegation playoffs
Ajax v PSV	1959–60	15 June 1960	2–2	Eredivisie promotion/relegation playoffs

1960s
Fixture	Season	Date	Result	Competition
Ajax v PSV	1960–61	4 September 1960	0–0	Eredivisie
PSV v Ajax	1960–61	19 February 1961	1–3	Eredivisie
PSV v Ajax	1961–62	19 November 1961	2–2	Eredivisie
Ajax v PSV	1961–62	15 April 1962	4–5	Eredivisie
Ajax v PSV	1962–63	26 December 1962	1–1	Eredivisie
PSV v Ajax	1962–63	9 June 1963	5–2	Eredivisie
Ajax v PSV	1963–64	3 November 1963	2–0	Eredivisie
PSV v Ajax	1963–64	5 April 1964	2–0	Eredivisie
Ajax v PSV	1964–65	22 November 1964	5–0	Eredivisie
PSV v Ajax	1964–65	11 April 1965	3–0	Eredivisie
Ajax v PSV	1965–66	5 September 1965	2–0	Eredivisie
PSV v Ajax	1965–66	6 March 1966	0–2	Eredivisie
Ajax v PSV	1966–67	9 October 1966	3–1	Eredivisie
PSV v Ajax	1966–67	26 February 1967	2–1	Eredivisie
PSV v Ajax	1967–68	15 October 1967	1–2	Eredivisie
Ajax v PSV	1967–68	17 March 1968	4–0	Eredivisie
PSV v Ajax	1968–69	8 December 1968	0–1	Eredivisie
Ajax v PSV	1968–69	15 May 1969	1–2	Eredivisie
Ajax v PSV	1969–70	5 October 1969	3–0	Eredivisie
PSV v Ajax	1969–70	30 March 1970	1–3	Eredivisie
Ajax v PSV	1969–70	27 May 1970	2–0	KNVB Cup

1970s
Fixture	Season	Date	Result	Competition
Ajax v PSV	1970–71	30 October 1970	1–0	Eredivisie
PSV v Ajax	1970–71	18 April 1971	0–3	Eredivisie
PSV v Ajax	1971–72	25 September 1971	1–1	Eredivisie
Ajax v PSV	1971–72	12 March 1972	4–1	Eredivisie
PSV v Ajax	1972–73	2 September 1972	0–3	Eredivisie
Ajax v PSV	1972–73	10 February 1973	3–1	Eredivisie
Ajax v PSV	1973–74	20 October 1973	1–1	Eredivisie
PSV v Ajax	1973–74	23 March 1974	3–1	Eredivisie
Ajax v PSV	1973–74	3 April 1974	1–2	KNVB Cup
PSV v Ajax	1974–75	15 December 1974	1–1	Eredivisie
Ajax v PSV	1974–75	27 April 1975	2–4	Eredivisie
PSV v Ajax	1975–76	20 September 1975	6–2	Eredivisie
Ajax v PSV	1975–76	27 March 1976	1–3	Eredivisie
Ajax v PSV	1976–77	1 September 1976	1–0	Eredivisie
PSV v Ajax	1976–77	29 January 1977	3–1	Eredivisie
Ajax v PSV	1977–78	4 December 1977	1–4	Eredivisie
PSV v Ajax	1977–78	23 April 1978	2–3	Eredivisie
Ajax v PSV	1978–79	9 September 1978	2–0	Eredivisie
PSV v Ajax	1978–79	17 March 1979	3–1	Eredivisie
Ajax v PSV	1979–80	11 November 1979	4–1	Eredivisie
PSV v Ajax	1979–80	12 April 1980	1–1	Eredivisie
PSV v Ajax	1979–80	16 April 1980	1–2	KNVB Cup
Ajax v PSV	1979–80	29 April 1980	1–1	KNVB Cup

1980s
Fixture	Season	Date	Result	Competition
Ajax v PSV	1980–81	14 September 1980	5–2	Eredivisie
PSV v Ajax	1980–81	7 March 1981	3–1	Eredivisie
PSV v Ajax	1980–81	15 April 1981	2–2	KNVB Cup
Ajax v PSV	1980–81	5 May 1981	2–1	KNVB Cup
PSV v Ajax	1981–82	24 October 1981	3–0	Eredivisie
Ajax v PSV	1981–82	18 April 1982	3–0	Eredivisie
PSV v Ajax	1982–83	9 October 1982	4–0	Eredivisie
Ajax v PSV	1982–83	6 March 1983	3–3	Eredivisie
Ajax v PSV	1982–83	30 March 1983	2–0	KNVB Cup
PSV v Ajax	1982–83	13 April 1983	3–1 (2–3 p)	KNVB Cup
PSV v Ajax	1983–84	5 November 1983	1–0	Eredivisie
Ajax v PSV	1983–84	21 April 1984	1–0	Eredivisie
Ajax v PSV	1984–85	16 December 1984	1–4	Eredivisie
Ajax v PSV	1984–85	13 March 1985	1–1	KNVB Cup
PSV v Ajax	1984–85	19 March 1985	2–0	KNVB Cup
PSV v Ajax	1984–85	2 June 1985	4–0	Eredivisie
Ajax v PSV	1985–86	28 August 1985	2–4	Eredivisie
PSV v Ajax	1985–86	16 March 1986	1–1	Eredivisie
Ajax v PSV	1986–87	31 August 1986	3–0	Eredivisie
PSV v Ajax	1986–87	29 March 1987	1–0	Eredivisie
PSV v Ajax	1987–88	30 August 1987	4–2	Eredivisie
Ajax v PSV	1987–88	7 February 1988	0–1	Eredivisie
Ajax v PSV	1988–89	9 October 1988	2–0	Eredivisie
PSV v Ajax	1988–89	19 March 1989	1–4	Eredivisie
PSV v Ajax	1989–90	10 September 1989	2–0	Eredivisie
Ajax v PSV	1989–90	5 January 1990	2–1	Philips Cup (friendly)
Ajax v PSV	1989–90	18 February 1990	3–2	Eredivisie
PSV v Ajax	1989–90	14 March 1990	2–2 (4–2 p)	KNVB Cup

1990s
Fixture	Season	Date	Result	Competition
Ajax v PSV	1990–91	28 October 1990	3–1	Eredivisie
PSV v Ajax	1990–91	7 April 1991	4–1	Eredivisie
PSV v Ajax	1991–92	20 October 1991	3–2	Eredivisie
Ajax v PSV	1991–92	19 January 1992	1–0	Eredivisie
Ajax v PSV	1991–92	9 February 1992	2–1 (a.e.t.)	KNVB Cup
Ajax v PSV	1992–93	9 August 1992	3–0	Friendly
Ajax v PSV	1992–93	5 September 1992	1–2	Eredivisie
PSV v Ajax	1992–93	14 February 1993	2–1	Eredivisie
Ajax v PSV	1993–94	5 September 1993	2–0	Eredivisie
PSV v Ajax	1993–94	6 February 1994	4–1	Eredivisie
PSV v Ajax	1994–95	23 October 1994	1–4	Eredivisie
Ajax v PSV	1994–95	22 January 1995	1–0	Eredivisie
Ajax v PSV	1995–96	5 November 1995	1–1	Eredivisie
PSV v Ajax	1995–96	8 April 1996	1–1	Eredivisie
Ajax v PSV	1996–97	18 August 1996	0–3	Johan Cruyff Shield
Ajax v PSV	1996–97	22 December 1996	0–2	Eredivisie
PSV v Ajax	1996–97	13 April 1997	2–0	Eredivisie
Ajax v PSV	1997–98	21 December 1997	3–4	Eredivisie
PSV v Ajax	1997–98	15 February 1998	1–1	Eredivisie
Ajax v PSV	1997–98	17 May 1998	5–0	KNVB Cup
Ajax v PSV	1998–99	16 August 1998	0–2	Johan Cruyff Shield
Ajax v PSV	1998–99	15 November 1998	2–2	Eredivisie
PSV v Ajax	1998–99	4 April 1999	3–1	Eredivisie
Ajax v PSV	1999–2000	15 December 1999	1–3	Eredivisie

2000s
Fixture	Season	Date	Result	Competition
PSV v Ajax	1999–2000	10 February 2000	4–0	Eredivisie
PSV v Ajax	2000–01	29 October 2000	1–1	Eredivisie
Ajax v PSV	2000–01	8 April 2001	0–1	Eredivisie
Ajax v PSV	2001–02	25 November 2001	1–3	Eredivisie
PSV v Ajax	2001–02	24 March 2002	1–1	Eredivisie
Ajax v PSV	2001–02	10 April 2002	3–0	KNVB Cup
Ajax v PSV	2002–03	11 August 2002	3–1	Johan Cruyff Shield
Ajax v PSV	2002–03	15 December 2002	2–4	Eredivisie
PSV v Ajax	2002–03	23 March 2003	2–0	Eredivisie
PSV v Ajax	2003–04	26 October 2003	2–2	Eredivisie
Ajax v PSV	2003–04	8 February 2004	2–1	Eredivisie
PSV v Ajax	2004–05	24 October 2004	2–0	Eredivisie
Ajax v PSV	2004–05	20 March 2005	0–4	Eredivisie
PSV v Ajax	2005–06	5 August 2005	1–2	Johan Cruyff Shield
PSV v Ajax	2005–06	23 October 2005	1–0	Eredivisie
Ajax v PSV	2005–06	11 March 2006	0–0	Eredivisie
Ajax v PSV	2005–06	7 May 2006	2–1	KNVB Cup
Ajax v PSV	2006–07	13 August 2006	3–1	Johan Cruyff Shield
Ajax v PSV	2006–07	12 November 2006	0–1	Eredivisie
PSV v Ajax	2006–07	18 March 2007	1–5	Eredivisie
Ajax v PSV	2007–08	11 August 2007	1–0	Johan Cruyff Shield
Ajax v PSV	2007–08	30 January 2008	0–2	Eredivisie
PSV v Ajax	2007–08	19 March 2008	0–0	Eredivisie
Ajax v PSV	2008–09	16 November 2008	4–1	Eredivisie
PSV v Ajax	2008–09	19 April 2009	6–2	Eredivisie
PSV v Ajax	2009–10	16 August 2009	4–3	Eredivisie
Ajax v PSV	2009–10	14 March 2010	4–1	Eredivisie

2010s
Fixture	Season	Date	Result	Competition
Ajax v PSV	2010–11	20 November 2010	0–0	Eredivisie
PSV v Ajax	2010–11	27 February 2011	0–0	Eredivisie
PSV v Ajax	2011–12	18 September 2011	2–2	Eredivisie
Ajax v PSV	2011–12	25 March 2012	2–0	Eredivisie
PSV v Ajax	2012–13	5 August 2012	4–2	Johan Cruyff Shield
Ajax v PSV	2012–13	1 December 2012	3–1	Eredivisie
PSV v Ajax	2012–13	14 April 2013	2–3	Eredivisie
PSV v Ajax	2013–14	22 September 2013	4–0	Eredivisie
Ajax v PSV	2013–14	19 January 2014	1–0	Eredivisie
Ajax v PSV	2014–15	24 August 2014	1–3	Eredivisie
PSV v Ajax	2014–15	1 March 2015	1–3	Eredivisie
Ajax v PSV	2015–16	4 October 2015	1–2	Eredivisie
PSV v Ajax	2015–16	20 March 2016	0–2	Eredivisie
Ajax v PSV	2016–17	18 December 2016	1–1	Eredivisie
PSV v Ajax	2016–17	23 April 2017	1–0	Eredivisie
Ajax v PSV	2017–18	10 December 2017	3–0	Eredivisie
PSV v Ajax	2017–18	15 April 2018	3–0	Eredivisie
PSV v Ajax	2018–19	23 September 2018	3–0	Eredivisie
Ajax v PSV	2018–19	31 March 2019	3–1	Eredivisie
Ajax v PSV	2019–20	27 July 2019	2–0	Johan Cruyff Shield
PSV v Ajax	2019–20	22 September 2019	1–1	Eredivisie

2020s
Fixture	Season	Date	Result	Competition
Ajax v PSV	2019–20	2 February 2020	1–0	Eredivisie
Ajax v PSV	2020–21	10 January 2021	2–2	Eredivisie
Ajax v PSV	2020–21	10 February 2021	2–1	KNVB Cup
PSV v Ajax	2020–21	28 February 2021	1–1	Eredivisie
Ajax v PSV	2021–22	7 August 2021	0–4	Johan Cruyff Shield
Ajax v PSV	2021–22	24 October 2021	5–0	Eredivisie
PSV v Ajax	2021–22	23 January 2022	1–2	Eredivisie
PSV v Ajax	2021–22	17 April 2022	2–1	KNVB Cup
Ajax v PSV	2022–23	30 July 2022	3–5	Johan Cruyff Shield
Ajax v PSV	2022–23	6 November 2022	1–2	Eredivisie
PSV v Ajax	2022–23	23 April 2023	3–0	Eredivisie
Ajax v PSV	2022–23	30 April 2023	1–1 (a.e.t.) (2–3 p)	KNVB Cup
PSV v Ajax	2023–24	29 October 2023	5–2	Eredivisie
Ajax v PSV	2023–24	3 February 2024	1–1	Eredivisie
Ajax v PSV	2024–25	2 November 2024	3–2	Eredivisie
PSV v Ajax	2024–25	30 March 2025	0–2	Eredivisie
PSV v Ajax	2025–26	21 September 2025	2–2	Eredivisie
Ajax v PSV	2025–26	2 May 2026	2–2	Eredivisie
Ajax v PSV	2026–27	5 September 2026	1–3	Eredivisie
PSV v Ajax	2026–27	27 February 2027		Eredivisie

== Transfers ==
=== From Ajax to PSV ===
Name	Nationality	Year	Direct / indirect transfer	Reference
Jan Hassink	Netherlands	1925	Direct transfer	
Piet van der Kuil	Netherlands	1959	Direct transfer	
Frits Soetekouw	Netherlands	1967	Direct transfer	
Ruud Geels	Netherlands	1981	Not a direct transfer	
Arie Haan	Netherlands	1983	Not a direct transfer	
Frank Arnesen	Denmark	1985	Not a direct transfer	
Gerald Vanenburg	Netherlands	1986	Direct transfer	
Ronald Koeman	Netherlands	1986	Direct transfer	
Wim Kieft	Netherlands	1987	Not a direct transfer	
Søren Lerby	Denmark	1987	Not a direct transfer	
Stanley Menzo	Netherlands	1994	Direct transfer	
Marciano Vink	Netherlands	1994	Not a direct transfer	
Jan Wouters	Netherlands	1994	Not a direct transfer	
Wim Jonk	Netherlands	1995	Not a direct transfer	
André Ooijer	Netherlands	1998	Played in Ajax youth academy	
Jason Čulina	Australia	2005	Not a direct transfer	
Michael Reiziger	Netherlands	2005	Not a direct transfer	
Patrick Kluivert	Netherlands	2006	Not a direct transfer	
Kenneth Perez	Denmark	2007	Direct transfer	
Nordin Amrabat	Morocco	2008	Played in Ajax youth academy	
Andy van der Meyde	Netherlands	2010	Not a direct transfer	
Jeremain Lens	Netherlands	2010	Played in Ajax youth academy	
Luciano Narsingh	Netherlands	2012	Played in Ajax youth academy	
Florian Jozefzoon	Netherlands	2013	Not a direct transfer	
Siem de Jong	Netherlands	2016	Not a direct transfer	
Pablo Rosario	Dominican Republic	2017	Played in Ajax youth academy	
Nick Viergever	Netherlands	2018	Direct transfer	
Donyell Malen	Netherlands	2018	Played in Ajax youth academy	
Noa Lang	Netherlands	2023	Not a direct transfer	
Sergiño Dest	United States	2023	Not a direct transfer	

=== From PSV to Ajax ===
Name	Nationality	Year	Direct / indirect transfer	Reference
Gert Bals	Netherlands	1965	Direct transfer	
Peter Hoekstra	Netherlands	1996	Direct transfer	
John Veldman	Netherlands	1996	Not a direct transfer	
Jaap Stam	Netherlands	2006	Not a direct transfer	
Klaas-Jan Huntelaar	Netherlands	2006	Not a direct transfer	
Jürgen Colin	Netherlands	2007	Not a direct transfer	
Dennis Rommedahl	Denmark	2007	Not a direct transfer	
Kenneth Perez	Denmark	2008	Loan transfer	
Ismaïl Aissati	Morocco	2008	Direct transfer	
Rob Wielaert	Netherlands	2009	Not a direct transfer	
André Ooijer	Netherlands	2010	Direct transfer	
Riechedly Bazoer	Netherlands	2012	Played in PSV youth academy	
Siem de Jong	Netherlands	2017	Return from loan transfer	
Zakaria Labyad	Morocco	2018	Not a direct transfer	
Steven Bergwijn	Netherlands	2022	Not a direct transfer	
Mohamed Ihattaren	Netherlands	2022	Not a direct transfer	
Oleksandr Zinchenko	Ukraine	2026	Not a direct transfer	

=== Managers and directors ===
Name	Nationality	Club	Background	Reference
Hans Kraay Sr.	Netherlands	Ajax	Manager 1974–75	
Hans Kraay Sr.	Netherlands	PSV	Manager 1985–87	
Kurt Linder	Germany	Ajax	Manager 1981–82 and 1988	
Kurt Linder	Germany	PSV	Manager 1968–72	
Ronald Koeman	Netherlands	Ajax	Manager 2002–05	
Ronald Koeman	Netherlands	PSV	Manager 2006–07	
Peter Bosz	Netherlands	Ajax	Manager 2016–17	
Peter Bosz	Netherlands	PSV	Manager 2023–present	
Hans Westerhof	Netherlands	Ajax	Interim manager in 2000	
Hans Westerhof	Netherlands	PSV	Manager 1992–93	
Aad de Mos	Netherlands	Ajax	Manager 1981–85	
Aad de Mos	Netherlands	PSV	Manager 1993–94	
Jan Wouters	Netherlands	Ajax	Manager 1999–2000	
Jan Wouters	Netherlands	PSV	Interim manager 2007–08	
Tonny Bruins Slot	Netherlands	Ajax	Assistant manager 1982–88 and 1999–2004; interim manager in 1985 and 2004	
Tonny Bruins Slot	Netherlands	PSV	Assistant manager 2006–07	

== See also ==
- Big Three (Netherlands)
- De Klassieker
