= History of Liverpool F.C. (1959–1985) =

History of an English football club

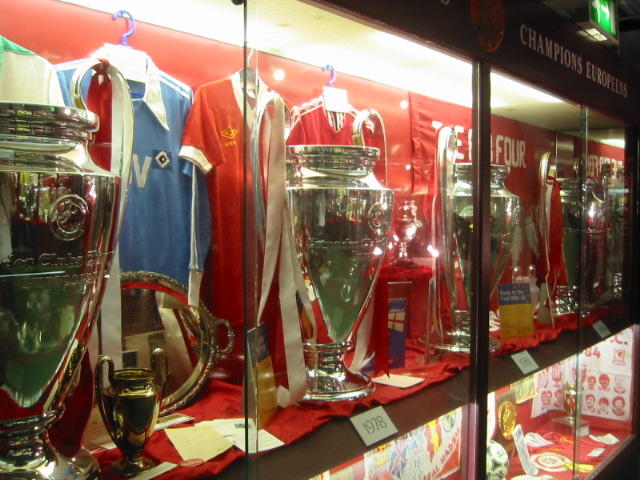
Replicas of the four European Champion Clubs' Cup Liverpool won from 1977 to 1984 on display in the club's museum

The history of Liverpool Football Club from 1959 to 1985 covers the period from the appointment of Bill Shankly as manager of the then-Second Division club, to the Heysel Stadium disaster and its aftermath.

Overhauling the team during his first year at Liverpool, Shankly released 24 players and converted a boot storage room into a meeting place where he and his coaches discussed strategy. The club won the Second Division title in 1961–62 and were promoted to the First Division. Two seasons later, Liverpool won their first League championship since 1946–47, thereby qualifying for participation in European competition for the first time. The following season, Liverpool won their first FA Cup. Further League championships followed in 1965–66 and 1972–73. 1973 saw them win their first European trophy—the UEFA Cup. The following season was Shankly's last, in which the club won the FA Cup once more.

Shankly's assistant Bob Paisley took over in 1974; his first season in charge saw Liverpool finish second, before winning the League championship and UEFA Cup the following season. Three European Cups and four League championships followed before Paisley retired at the end of 1982–83, to be replaced by his assistant, Joe Fagan.

Liverpool won a treble of trophies during Fagan's first season as manager, winning the League championship for the third year in succession, the Football League Cup for the fourth year in succession and a fourth European Cup. The following season, the club was involved in one of the worst disasters to occur at a football stadium. Before the start of the 1985 European Cup Final against Juventus, Liverpool fans breached a fence separating the two groups of supporters, and charged the Juventus fans. The resulting weight of people caused a retaining wall to collapse, killing 39 fans, mostly Italians. The incident became known as the Heysel Stadium disaster and resulted in the expulsion of English clubs from European competition for five years.

== 1959–65: rebuilding ==
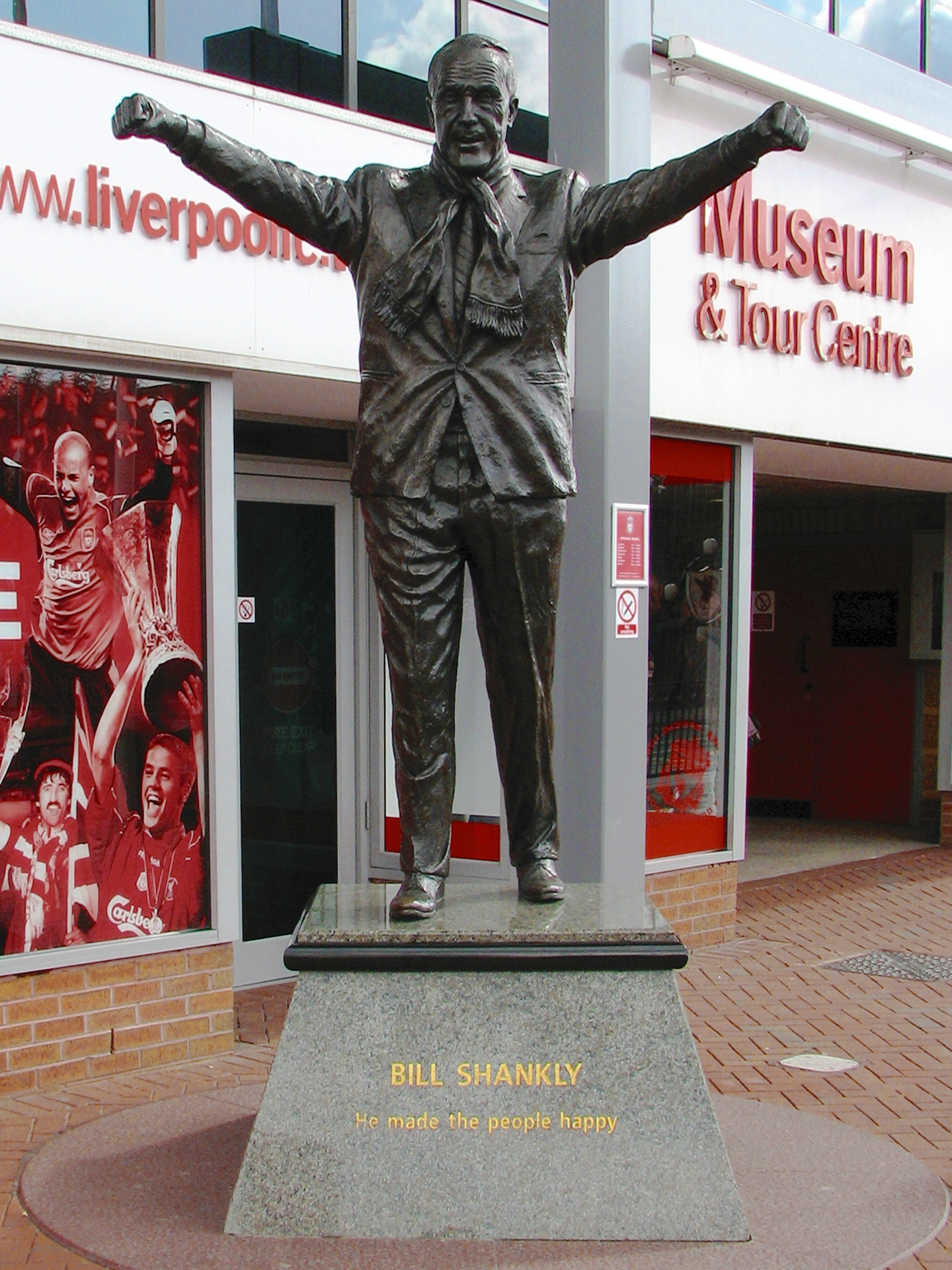
Pictured is a statue of Bill Shankly outside Anfield. Shankly won promotion to the First Division and the club's first league title since 1947.

Huddersfield Town's Bill Shankly was appointed Liverpool manager midway through the 1959–60 season. He was approached by Liverpool chairman T. V. Williams, who asked Shankly if he would like to manage "the best club in the country", to which he replied, "Why, is Matt Busby packing up?". A perceived lack of ambition at Huddersfield Town and the potential at Liverpool led Shankly to accept the offer. When he arrived, the club was in the Second Division, having played at this level since relegation in 1953–54. During his first season in charge, Shankly gave debuts to two players: Ian Callaghan, who would go on to become the club's record appearance maker, and Roger Hunt, the club's future leading goalscorer in the League.

Despite their introduction, Shankly's impact was not immediate, as the club finished the season in third place, outside the promotion spots. Shankly had been musing on which players to keep and which to move on, and he eventually decided that 24 players should be released; by the end of his first season they had all left the club. Shankly retained the existing backroom staff, and converted a boot storage room into a meeting place where he and his coaches could discuss strategy. The Boot Room, as it came to be known, was to be an integral part of the club's future success. Bob Paisley was clear on the significance of the Boot Room: "You got a more wide-ranging discussion in the Boot Room than the boardroom. What went on was kept within those four walls. There was a certain mystique about the place."

The club again finished third the following season, despite a run of 14 games without defeat; 5 defeats in the opening 11 matches had cost Liverpool the chance of promotion. Shareholder John Moores believed the club needed to spend more money on players to be successful and encouraged chairman T. V. Williams to do so. The following season, Shankly signed Ian St John from Motherwell and Ron Yeats from Dundee United. Shankly was confident his signings would be a success, challenging the board of directors to "sack me if they can't play". St John and Yeats helped the club win promotion to the First Division; they won the Second Division with 62 points, and were unbeaten at their home ground Anfield all season. Liverpool were back in the First Division for the first time in eight years in 1962–63. Despite an uneasy start, they were in fifth place by March 1963, after a 13-match unbeaten run. Liverpool's form suffered following their 1–0 loss to Leicester City in the FA Cup semi-final, and a poor run of results including a 7–2 defeat to Tottenham Hotspur saw the club finish the season in eighth place.

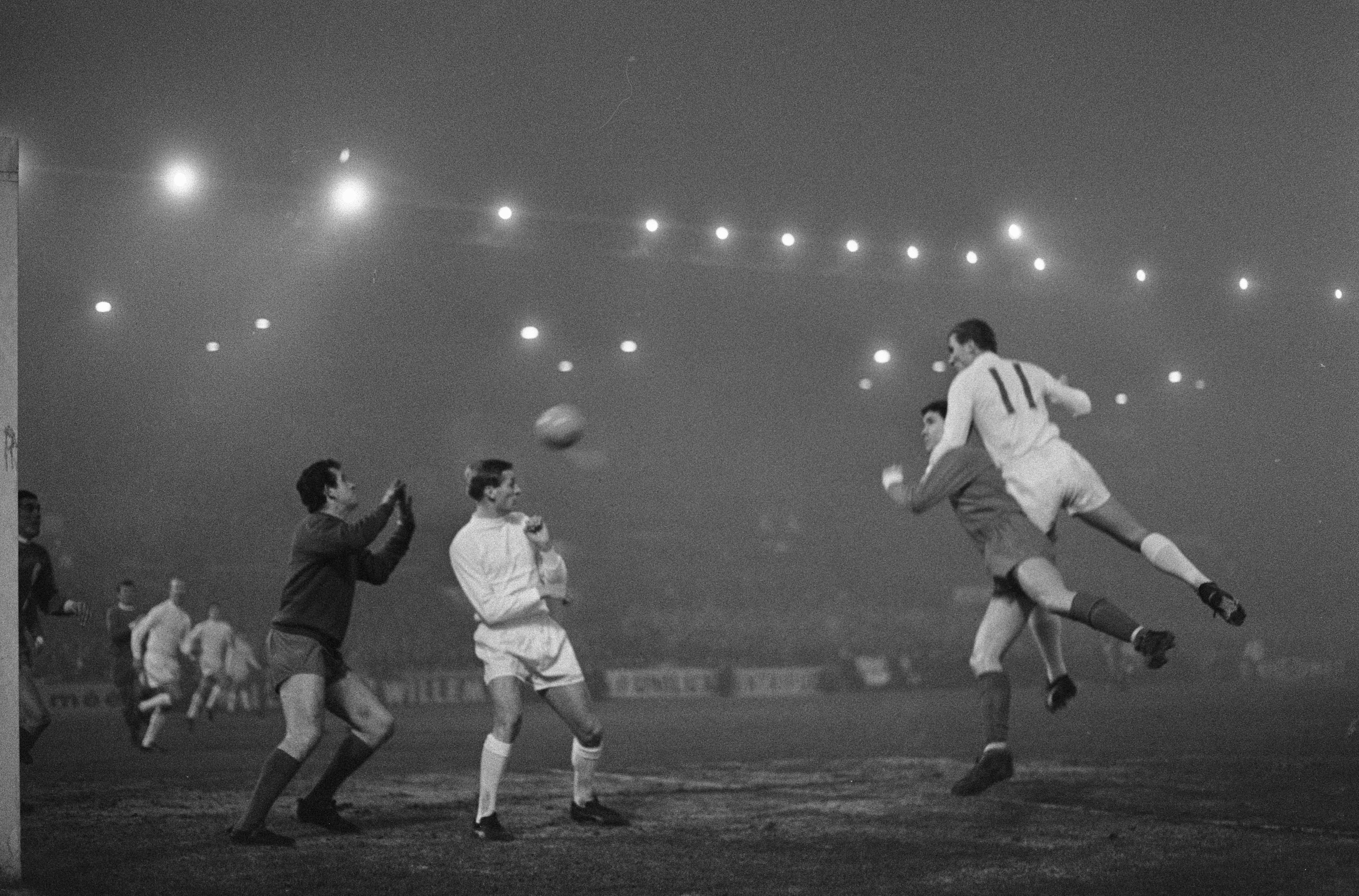
Liverpool playing Ajax of Netherlands in the European Cup, a match they lost 5–1

The following season, Shankly signed Peter Thompson from Preston North End as he could play wide on the right-hand side of midfield. Liverpool started 1963–64 poorly, garnering only nine points from the first nine games. A 2–1 victory over Everton, their first win over their local rivals since 1950, instigated Liverpool's move up the table. They won 47 points from their next 30 games to secure their sixth League championship. Success led to the average attendance at Anfield increasing to more than 50,000. The fans also became more vocal, and it was around this time that the fans on the Kop adopted You'll Never Walk Alone as their anthem.

Liverpool's League championship qualified them to participate in European competition for the first time, in the 1964–65 European Cup. For their second round tie against Belgian team Anderlecht, Shankly decided to change from red shirts, white shorts and socks to an all-red kit. Shankly felt the players would be more intimidating to the opposition as a result. Liverpool reached the semi-final, but were beaten by Italian club Internazionale. The tie was not without controversy; Shankly felt that the referee showed bias towards Internazionale, as he had allowed questionable goals by the Italians to stand. Liverpool's form in the European Cup carried over into the FA Cup, in which they reached the final against Leeds United. The game was goalless for the first 90 minutes, but Liverpool took the lead in extra time, courtesy of a goal by Hunt. Leeds equalised shortly afterwards, but a St John goal secured a 2–1 victory for Liverpool, and their first FA Cup triumph. Liverpool's form in cup competitions did not translate to their performance in the League, as the defence of their championship ended with the club finishing in seventh place.

== 1965–70: stability ==
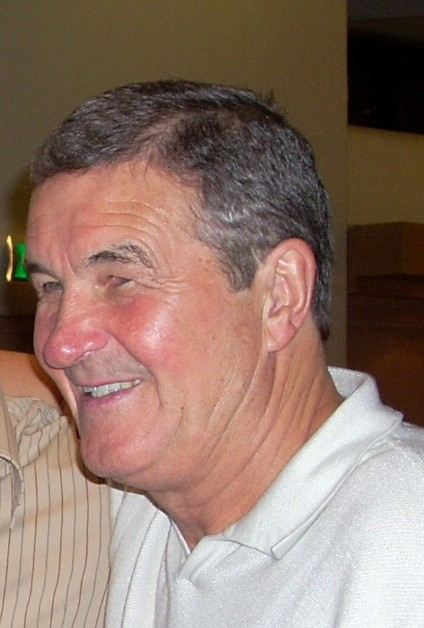
Ron Yeats captained Liverpool from 1961 to 1970.

Victory in the FA Cup meant Liverpool would participate in the European Cup Winners' Cup during 1965–66. They went one stage further than the previous season, as they reached the final, facing German team Borussia Dortmund. The two sides were level at 1–1 at the end of 90 minutes and the match went into extra time. Liverpool were unable to score and conceded a goal to Dortmund, who won the match 2–1. Shankly was unimpressed with his team's performance, stating: "We didn't play well and we gave away two silly goals." Their defence of the FA Cup ended in the third round, after defeat to Chelsea. Their lack of success in cup competitions was offset by regaining the League championship on the last day of April 1966 when they beat Chelsea, courtesy of two goals from Hunt.

The next few seasons were not as successful. A return to the European Cup in 1966–67 saw Liverpool eliminated 7–3 on aggregate by Dutch side Ajax in the second round. The League campaign was equally disappointing, as the team finished the season in fifth place, winning only 2 of their last 11 games. One significant event during the season was the arrival of future captain Emlyn Hughes from Blackpool for a £65,000 fee. The 1967–68 season started well, with Liverpool league leaders through much of September, October and November 1967. An accumulation of matches due to participation in the Inter-Cities Fairs Cup, FA Cup and Football League Cup impacted negatively on Liverpool's League form. They finished the season in third place behind champions Manchester City. The 59 games Liverpool played during the season did not result in success. The furthest the club progressed in any competition was the quarter-final of the FA Cup.

The following season saw an improvement in League form, but there was no reward. Poor performances in the cup competitions meant Liverpool had less fixture congestion than the previous season, but that did not translate into a League championship as they finished in second place, six points behind Leeds United. Shankly's team was beginning to age, and several players had moved on or retired. Gerry Byrne, who had been the club's left back for 12 seasons, retired after making 333 appearances. Shankly now had the task of replacing the players in his squad. He started the process with the purchase of Hughes and then Ray Clemence the season before, but his signings did not always work out. Tony Hateley joined for a club record fee of £96,000 from Chelsea, but injury and poor form meant he was sold to Coventry City after a year. During the 1968–69 season Shankly signed Alun Evans for £100,000 from Wolverhampton Wanderers, a record fee for a teenager at the time. Despite a good start, Evans suffered a series of injuries that cut his career short.

The 1969–70 season was the beginning of a transitional period for Liverpool, as players such as Hunt, St John and Yeats made their last appearances for the club. A sixth-round loss to Watford in the FA Cup convinced Shankly that some of his older players should be moved on. Liverpool nevertheless started the season well, and were unbeaten in their first ten League matches until a 1–0 defeat to Manchester United. They were unable to maintain their early season form and finished in fifth place. Success in the other cup competitions was not forthcoming, as Liverpool exited in the early rounds of the Football League Cup and Inter-Cities Fairs Cup.

== 1970–75: transition ==
Shankly's new squad began to take shape during 1970–71, with many of the young players he had signed playing in the first team. As a result, the average age of the team was 22. Players such as Clemence, Steve Heighway, Alec Lindsay and Larry Lloyd, began to establish themselves in the team. John Toshack was also signed from Cardiff City to replace Hunt. Liverpool were unable to improve upon the previous season's League position, finishing in fifth place, but they had more success in cup competitions. They reached the semi-finals of the Inter-Cities Fairs Cup, but lost to Leeds United over two-legs. Liverpool progressed to the final of the FA Cup, and played Arsenal. Although Liverpool took the lead in extra time after a goalless 90 minutes, Arsenal won 2–1 to complete a League and cup double.

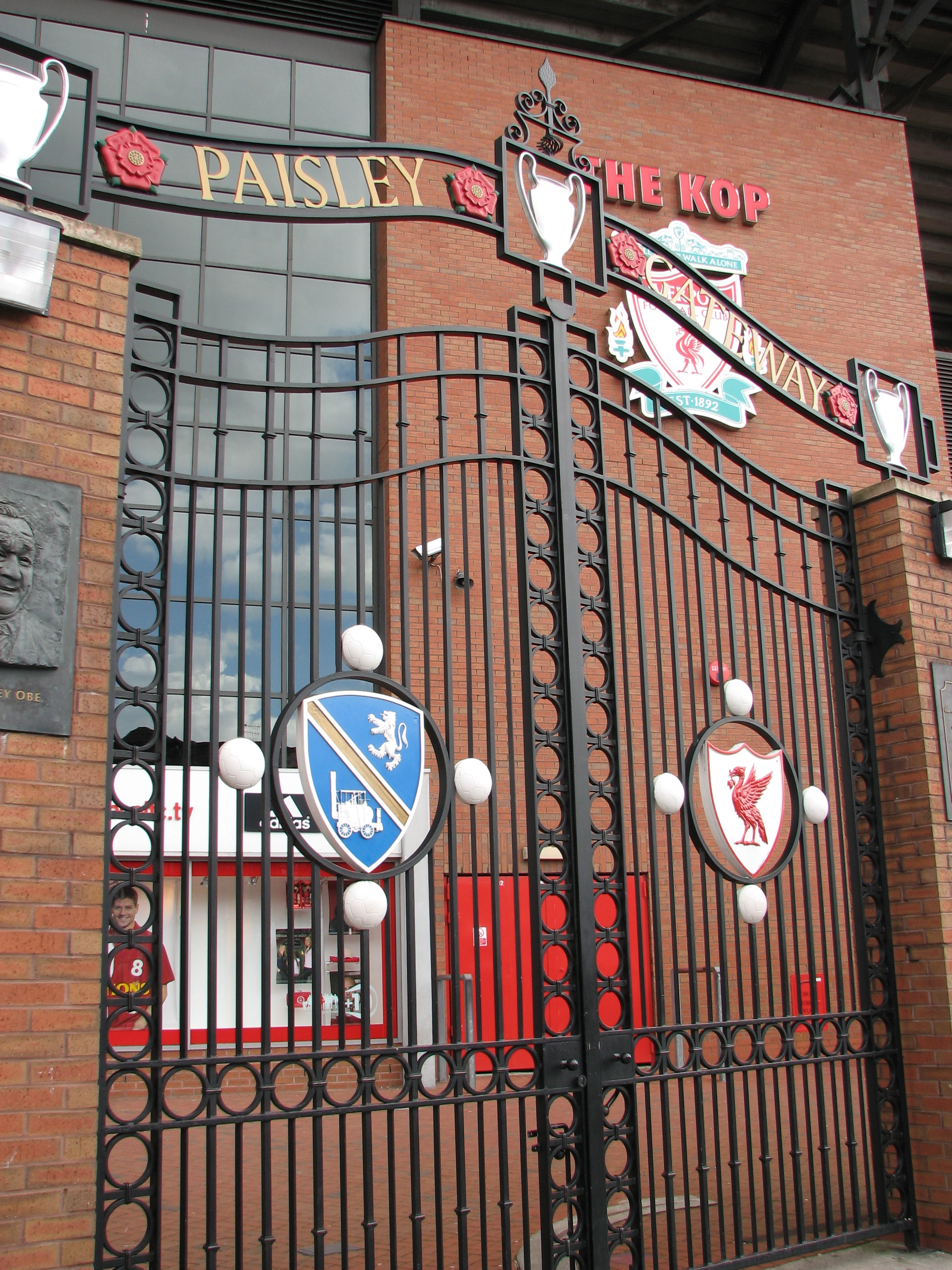
The Paisley Gateway is a tribute to former manager Bob Paisley, who is the most successful manager in the club's history.

Before the final against Arsenal, Shankly signed Kevin Keegan from Scunthorpe United. Keegan became a key player for Liverpool and his impact was immediate, as he scored 12 minutes into his Liverpool debut. The addition of Keegan almost helped Liverpool regain the League championship. They went into the final day of the season a point behind Derby County, who had already finished their campaign, but were unable to secure the victory they needed against Arsenal, finishing in third place. The 1972–73 season was when Shankly's new Liverpool team delivered, winning the League and the club's first European trophy, the UEFA Cup. They started the season well and were top of the League after a 5–0 victory over Sheffield United. They maintained that position throughout the remainder of the season, securing the League championship after a 0–0 draw against Leicester City. It was the club's eighth League title, equalling the record held by Arsenal. Further success followed in the UEFA Cup, as the club reached the final against German team Borussia Mönchengladbach. A 3–0 victory in the first leg and a 2–0 loss in the second leg meant Liverpool won the tie 3–2 on aggregate, claiming their first European trophy. They became the first English team to win the League and a European trophy in the same season.

John Smith became chairman in 1973; his appointment was based around his business experience, with the idea of developing of a more corporate approach to the club's decision making. He believed in continuity and ended the club's policy of changing chairman every three years. The biggest development at Anfield in recent years occurred in 1973, as the old Main Stand was demolished and a new one constructed. The stand was officially opened by the Duke of Kent on 10 March 1973. Their triumph in the League meant Liverpool would compete in the 1973–74 European Cup. They were not as successful as the previous season and were eliminated in the second round by Yugoslav team Red Star Belgrade. Liverpool made a poor start to their League campaign, losing early on to Coventry City and Derby County, as opposed to Leeds United, who were unbeaten in their first 29 games of the season. Liverpool reduced the gap, but a poor end to the season, in which they won only one of their last eight matches, meant they finished second to Leeds. Despite their lack of success in other competitions, Liverpool reached the final of the FA Cup, beating Newcastle United 3–0 to win the cup for the second time. Shankly bought Ray Kennedy from Arsenal at the end of the season, which was his last act as Liverpool manager. He resigned soon afterwards, citing the need for a break, and was replaced by his assistant Bob Paisley.

Shankly continued to turn up at Melwood, the club's training ground, where the players still referred to him as 'boss'. Reluctantly, Paisley asked him to stay away from training, in order to assert his authority as manager. Liverpool started 1974–75 well; they were unbeaten in their first six League matches, and recorded their biggest ever win when they beat Strømsgodset 11–0 in the 1974–75 European Cup Winners' Cup. Liverpool were nevertheless knocked out by Hungarian side Ferencváros on the away goals rule in the next round. The club's participation in domestic cup competitions ended early as well, being eliminated in the fourth round in the FA Cup and Football League Cup. Liverpool's good start to the season in the League was not sustained and they eventually finished in second place. Paisley made some important signings during the course of the season. He signed Phil Neal, Terry McDermott and Jimmy Case, who would become regulars in the successful team that Paisley was to build.

== 1975–81: sustained success ==
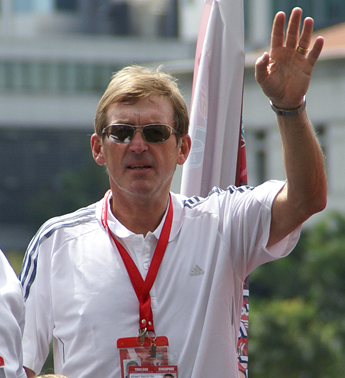
Kenny Dalglish scored the winning goal in the 1978 European Cup Final.

The 1975–76 season did not start well, as Liverpool lost 2–0 to Queens Park Rangers in their first match. Their form had not improved by mid-October 1975, by which time they had won only six of their first twelve matches. Liverpool's form picked up in the second half of the season; a late-season run in which they dropped only one point in nine matches left them a point behind Queens Park Rangers going into their final match. Victory over Wolverhampton Wanderers would secure the League championship as Queens Park Rangers had already finished their league campaign. The match did not start well, and Liverpool were a goal behind at half-time, but won the match 3–1 with three second-half goals to win the League championship. Liverpool were eliminated early from the FA Cup and League Cup but fared better in Europe, progressing to the final of the UEFA Cup. A 4–3 aggregate victory over Belgian team Club Brugge meant the club won the trophy for the second time.

Before the start of 1976–77, Keegan revealed Liverpool's primary aim was to flourish in Europe: "There's a tremendous ambition among all the lads to win the European Cup. We've won everything else in the last five years and there's a feeling that the European Cup is going to be next." Liverpool started the season in good form, losing only 2 of their first 16 games in the League, a run that put them top by September 1976. A blip during the Christmas period, which included a 5–1 defeat to Aston Villa, did not prevent Liverpool from winning their tenth League championship. Liverpool were again successful in Europe, reaching the final of the European Cup for the first time and beating Borussia Mönchengladbach 3–1 to become the champions of Europe. Paisley's team were denied a treble of trophies when they lost the FA Cup final to Manchester United.

Keegan had been sold to German club Hamburg for a £500,000 fee before the start of 1977–78. Paisley signed Kenny Dalglish from Celtic as Keegan's replacement. His impact was immediate, as he scored 20 goals in 42 league games. Dalglish scored the winning goal in Liverpool's 1–0 victory over Club Brugge in the 1978 European Cup Final, as the club retained the trophy, becoming the first British team to do so. Despite their success in Europe, Liverpool were unsuccessful in domestic competitions. They finished seven points behind Nottingham Forest in the League, who were also their opponents in the 1978 Football League Cup Final. After ending 0–0 the match went to a replay, which Nottingham Forest won 1–0.

Liverpool began 1978–79 in contrasting fashion. They were drawn against Nottingham Forest in the first round of the European Cup and were eliminated after a 2–0 aggregate defeat. There was also an early exit from the League Cup, as they lost 1–0 to Sheffield United in the second round. But those setbacks were offset by Liverpool's start in the League; they won their first six games and did not lose until their twelfth—a 1–0 loss to Everton. Their form continued over the season and they won the League, finishing eight points ahead of Nottingham Forest. Their performance in the League broke several records; the 68 points they gained surpassed the 67 earned by Leeds United in 1968–69. The 16 goals conceded was another record.

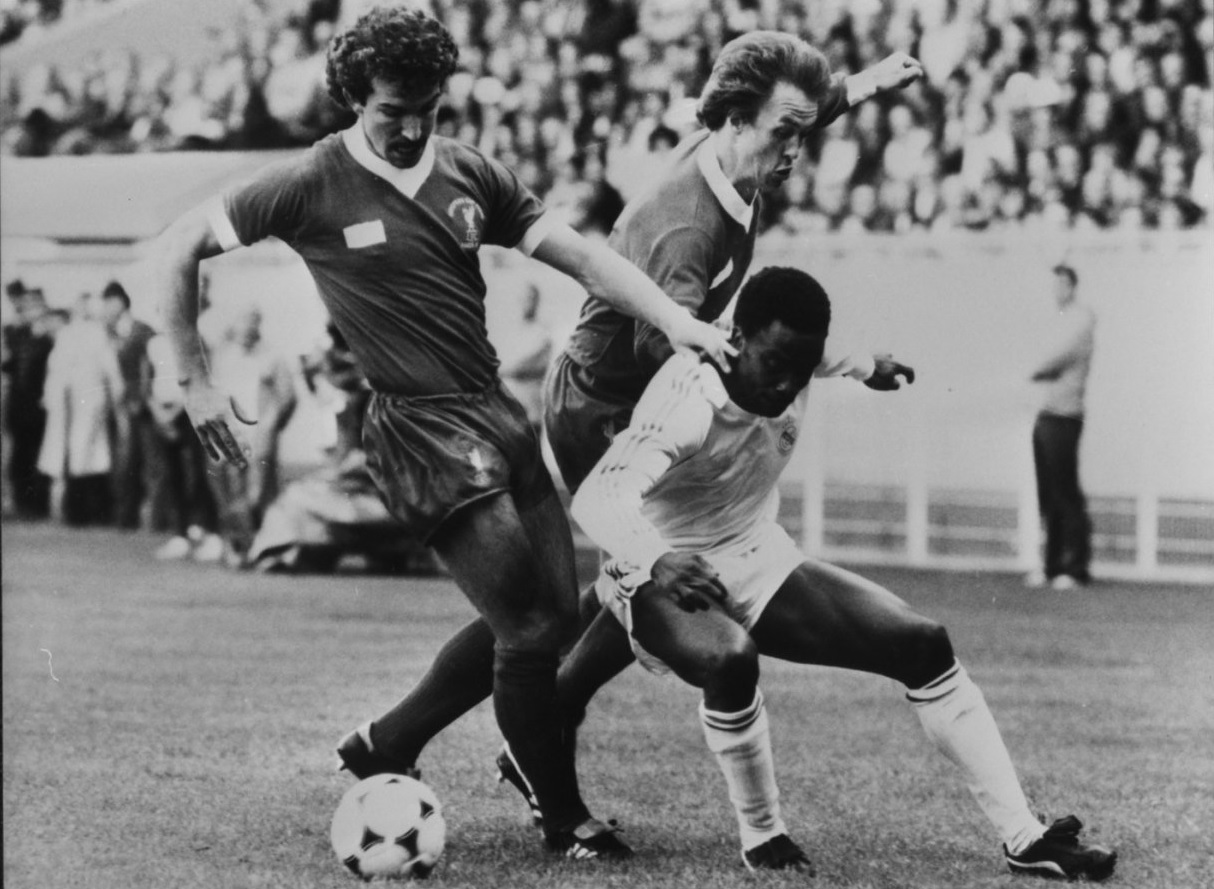
Graeme Souness, Phil Neal and Laurie Cunningham fighting over the ball in the 1981 European Cup final

Liverpool retained the League championship in the following season. Despite early defeats to Southampton and Nottingham Forest, they were top by January 1980 and stayed there for the remainder of the season. A 4–1 victory over Aston Villa in the penultimate game of the season secured the League championship. Key to the club's success was their home form; they were unbeaten at Anfield all season, and only conceded eight goals. Their impressive form in the League did not translate to Europe, as Liverpool were knocked out in the first round of the European Cup by Soviet team Dinamo Tbilisi. They fared better in the FA Cup and League Cup, but were unable to progress past the semi-final stage in either competition. During the season, Liverpool became the first British club to wear the name of a sponsor, Hitachi, on their shirts. Chairman John Smith was clear about the club's need for extra income: "The days are gone when a club like ours can control its destiny on the money coming through the turnstiles."

The 1980–81 season was a contrast to previous seasons as the club struggled in the League, but excelled in cup competitions. Despite losing 8 games, the same as eventual winners Aston Villa, Liverpool drew 17 to finish in fifth place, their worst position for 16 years. Liverpool's form in the cups was much better; an early elimination in the FA Cup withstanding, they reached the finals of the Football League Cup and European Cup. They won the Football League Cup for the first time, beating West Ham United 2–1 in a replay after the final ended in a draw. Real Madrid were Liverpool's opponents in the 1981 European Cup Final, and they won the competition for the third time, courtesy of an Alan Kennedy goal in a 1–0 victory.

== 1981–85: triumph and tragedy ==
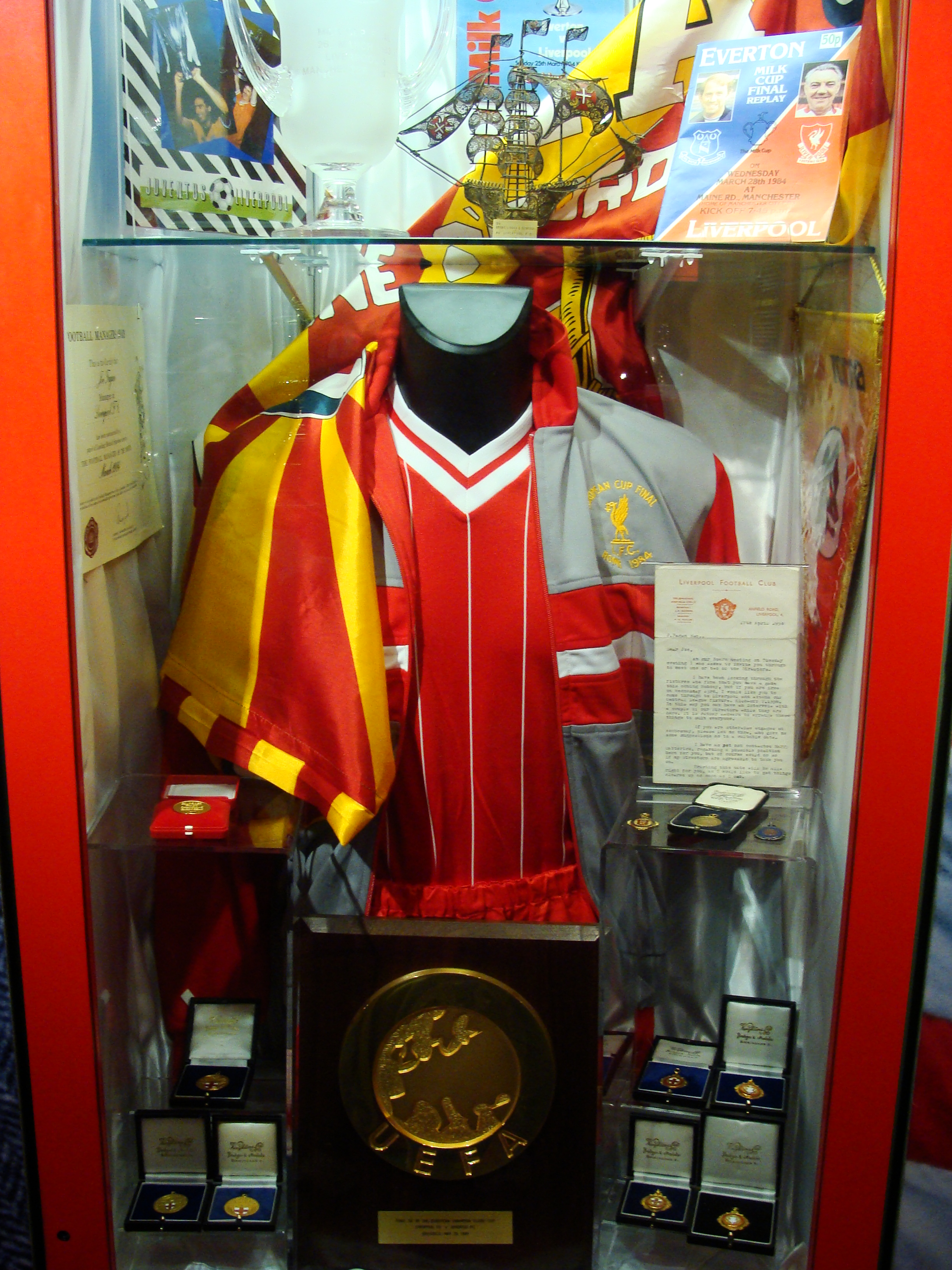
Exhibit of memorabilia from the 1984 European Cup Final on display in the club's museum

Following their fifth-place League finish the previous season, Liverpool were eager to regain the League championship. Their goalkeeper, Clemence, had signed for Tottenham Hotspur, and was replaced by Bruce Grobbelaar. Liverpool did not perform well in their early games, losing their first match and drawing several others. Their poor form continued, and by the end of December 1981 they had won only 6 of 17 games, and were in the bottom half of the League. Their form in the second half of the season improved, and a run of 11 successive wins towards the end of the season meant they won the League with four points more than Ipswich Town. Liverpool retained the League championship in 1982–83, winning the title 11 points ahead of Watford. Liverpool were eliminated from the FA Cup and European Cup in the fifth round and quarter-final respectively, but were successful in the Football League Cup. A 2–1 victory over Manchester United in the final meant Liverpool won the competition for the third year in succession. Before the start of the season, Paisley had announced his intention to retire from management aged 64. Paisley had won six League championships, three European Cups and League Cups during his reign, making him the most successful manager in the club's history. He was replaced by his assistant Joe Fagan.

Liverpool continued their success into 1983–84, as they won three competitions to secure a unique treble. The club began the campaign indifferently, but by November 1983 they were top of the table and stayed there to win the League three points ahead of Southampton. As a result, they equalled the record of three consecutive League championships held by Huddersfield Town and Arsenal. Key to their success was striker Ian Rush, who scored 32 goals over the league campaign, and a further 13 in other competitions. Liverpool again reached the final of the Football League Cup, where they faced Everton. A 0–0 draw in the first match at Wembley Stadium meant that the match was replayed at Maine Road the following week. A Graeme Souness goal secured a 1–0 victory and the club's fourth successive League Cup triumph. Liverpool performed well in Europe, reaching the final of the European Cup. They faced Italian team Roma at their home stadium, the Stadio Olimpico. A 1–1 draw after 90 minutes and extra time meant the match went to a penalty shoot-out, which Liverpool won. Alan Kennedy scored the winning penalty after Grobbelaar had distracted Roma player Francesco Graziani, causing him to miss his own penalty.

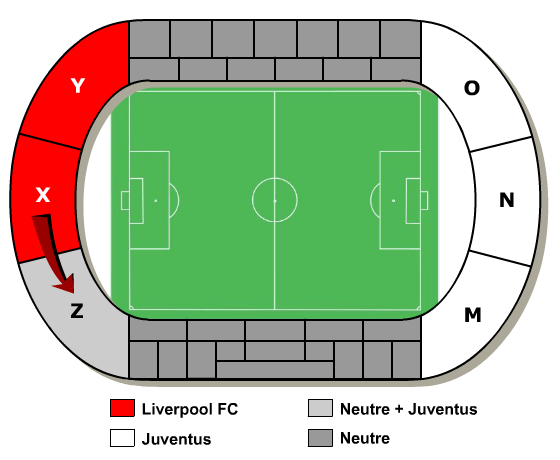
Plan of the Heysel Stadium, showing the section of the stadium where the disaster occurred

Fagan's second season in charge was less successful, as Liverpool failed to win a trophy for the first time in nine years. The defence of their League championship was all but over in October 1984 when Liverpool were in the relegation places. The club's form picked up afterwards, but they were unable to catch Everton and finished 13 points behind in second place. Their defence of the Football League Cup ended in the third round and Fagan's team played no further part in the FA Cup, after defeat to Manchester United at the semi-final. Liverpool did fare better in Europe, reaching their fifth European Cup final. Before the match against Juventus at the Heysel Stadium commenced, Liverpool fans had breached a fence separating the two sets of supporters. As the Juventus fans fled to safety, the accumulation of people against a perimeter wall caused it to collapse, killing 39 fans, most of whom were Italians. The collapse of the wall led to rioting by Juventus fans at the other end of the ground. As a result, the match was delayed by two hours, but was played regardless, as it was feared its abandonment would lead to further violence. Juventus won the final 1–0.

In the aftermath of the match, the blame for the Heysel Stadium disaster was laid on the Liverpool fans. UEFA official Günter Schneider stated, "Only the English fans were responsible. Of that, there is no doubt." As a result, The Football Association withdrew English clubs from European competition, and two days later UEFA banned English clubs for "an indeterminate period of time". A condition was added, stipulating that Liverpool would serve another three-year ban once the ban on English clubs was lifted. Fagan had decided to retire before the match; he felt the team needed rebuilding and he was not the ideal man to do this with his 64th birthday approaching. He was replaced by Dalglish, who became the club's first player-manager.

== Bibliography ==
- Graham, Matthew (1985). Liverpool. London: Hamlyn Publishing Group. ISBN 0-600-50254-6.
- Hale, Steve; Ponting, Ivan (1992). Liverpool in Europe. London: Guinness. ISBN 0-85112-569-7.
- Hopkins, Stephen; Long, Cathy; Williams, John (2001). Passing Rhythms: Liverpool FC and the Transformation of Football. Oxford: Berg. ISBN 1-85973-303-4.
- Inglis, Simon (1983). The Football Grounds of England and Wales. London: Willow. ISBN 0-00-218024-3.
- Kelly, Stephen F. (1988). The Official Illustrated History of Liverpool FC: You'll Never Walk Alone. London: Queen Anne Press. ISBN 0-356-19594-5.
- Liversedge, Stan (1991). Liverpool: The Official Centenary History, 1892–1992. London: Hamlyn Publishing Group. ISBN 0-600-57308-7.
- Pead, Brian (1986). Liverpool: A Complete Record. Derby: Breedon Books. ISBN 0-907969-15-1.
- Shankly, Bill; Roberts, John (1976). Shankly. London: Arthur Barker Ltd. ISBN 0-213-16603-8.
- Williams, John (2010). Reds: Liverpool Football Club – The Biography. Edinburgh: Mainstream Publishing. ISBN 978-1-84596-682-9.
- Wilson, Jonathan; Murray, Scott (2013). The Anatomy of Liverpool: A History in Ten Matches. London: Orion. ISBN 978-1-4091-2692-8.
