= Henning Friise =

Norwegian footballer (born 1963)

Personal information
- Full name: Henning Antonsen Friise
- Date of birth: 3 May 1963 (age 63)
- Position: Goalkeeper

Youth career
- Strømsgodset

Senior career*
Years	Team	Apps	(Gls)
1983–1986	Åssiden		
1987–1993	Mjøndalen		(1)
1994–1996	Stabæk	73	(0)
1998	Vestfossen		

Managerial career
- 1997–1998: Mjøndalen (goalkeeper coach)
- * Club domestic league appearances and goals

Henning Friise (born 3 May 1963) is a Norwegian footballer who played as a goalkeeper. He played two seasons in the highest Norwegian league for Mjøndalen and two for Stabæk—1987, 1992, 1995 and 1996.

== Career ==
The son of a football and bandy player, Henning Friise also practiced both sports at a young age. His father Ole Jonny Friise (1941–2024) played for Strømsgodset IF team that won the 1969 Norwegian Football Cup followed by the double in 1970, as well as eight Norwegian titles in bandy and a silver medal at the 1965 Bandy World Championship.

=== Mjøndalen ===
Friise joined Mjøndalen IF from Åssiden IF ahead of the 1987 season. Roy Amundsen was Mjøndalen's first-choice goalkeeper in the 1987 1. divisjon, but Friise was given the chance for a period, which included 3 league games and a 0–5 loss to Werder Bremen in the 1987–88 UEFA Cup.

In the 1988 Norwegian Football Cup, Friise was credited as the "hero" as Mjøndalen eliminated first-tier team Strømmen. He kept a clean sheet and saved a penalty kick, doing so "miraculously" according to VG.

Following the 1989 Mjøndalen–Strømsgodset derby, Friise received unprecedented praise from the newspaper Fremtiden. The journalist handed out the grade 10 out of 10 for the first time in the newspaper's history, hailing him as a "hero", for "doing the impossible" and showcasing skills of "international standing". Drammens Tidende agreed that Friise was "impossible" to beat in this particular derby match.

In the 1991 Norwegian Football Cup, Friise was again credited as the "hero" as Mjøndalen eliminated Drøbak-Frogn. He both saved and scored a penalty kick during the penalty shootout. Mjøndalen was eventually knocked out of the cup by rivals Strømsgodset, but on the same day as the derby took place, it became final lear that no team could overtake Mjøndalen in the league, thus securing their promotion from the 1991 1. divisjon.

The 1992 Eliteserien campaign became difficult for Mjøndalen. According to Fremtiden, Friise was Mjøndalen's best player and "saviour". He was abandoned by his teammates, the newspaper wrote, "picking out the ball from the back of the net almost incessantly" and becoming "Eliteserien's living bullseye". From the fourteenth round, Mjøndalen started collecting points, with Friise "almost bricking up the goal". In the last round of the season, Friise even scored from the penalty spot. VG named him man of the match as also he saved chances "high and low". It was not enough for Mjøndalen, who ended last on the table and were relegated. According to VG's post-match grading throughout the season, Friise was Mjøndalen's best player in 1992, as well as the seventh best goalkeeper, slightly behind Erik Holtan, but comfortably ahead of the Norwegian international at the time, Frode Grodås. Moreover, Friise's penalty goal was Mjøndalens last Eliteserien goal for decades, until the team finally managed to return in 2015.

=== Stabæk ===
Friise originally retired after the 1993 season, being fed up with football. After rejecting one offer from Stabæk, he decided to sign for the Bærum-based club climbing the football ranks. As Stabæk secured promotion from the 1994 1. divisjon during their first season there, Friise decided to keep playing and get a third spell in Eliteserien.

In the third game of the 1995 Eliteserien, the newly promoted Stabæk recorded their first-ever Eliteserien victory, with Friise keeping a clean sheet.

According to VG, Friise's biggest weakness was his aerial work, whereas he had "excellent" skills as a shotstopper. Some gave him the derogatory nickname "Krise" ("crisis", rhyming with Friise in Norwegian) when he made errors. After a 1995 match attended by Joe Jordan, VG however suggested that Jordan should scout Friise and bring him to Jordan's club at the time, Bristol City.

On occasions such as Stabæk's away match against Tromsø in 1996, Friise was lauded as Stabæk's best player, only letting one deflected shot past him. However, the backlash increased in 1996. VG particularly criticized an error against Moss in May 1996 which cost Stabæk 2 points, with the commentator Truls Dæhli summarizing: "Stabæk? Petter Belsvik scores, Henning Friise concedes. In other words, a draw". Asker og Bærums Budstikke described the finish that ended as a goal as a lompe, referring to a limp potato bread. Against Strømsgodset at home, Friise was met with "lots of negative comments from the home audience", to which he replied: "Harassment is just amusing". He also conceded two very easy goals in the cup against Eik, though Stabæk managed to come out on top with a 3–2 victory. The worst mistake of the year came in the last match, against Vålerenga. Friise fumbled an aerial ball, stating that he was watching the player he would distribute the ball to, instead of the ball itself. Sang Vålerenga's fans, "Friise loves Vålerenga". Friise was not given a new contract ahead of the 1996 season, with Stabæk wanting to strengthen the goalkeeper position.

== Personal life ==
He resided at Åssiden in Drammen, and worked for the Norwegian State Railways (NSB) outside of football. After Mjøndalen's relegation from the 1992 Eliteserien, Friise stated that he wanted a change of clubs, but: "Due to employment in the NSB I depend on moving to a location with a train service".

After retiring as a player, he was a goalkeeper coach of Mjøndalen. He immediately started coaching Anders Rotevatn, who later signed for Stabæk. The next year, Thomas Solvoll transferred to Mjøndalen, also to be coached by Friise. In 1998, Friise also returned as an amateur player for Vestfossen IF.

As the Norwegian State Railways was demerged, Friise became a railroad signaling consultant in the NRC Group, being contracted by Bane NOR and inspecting railroad stretches all over Norway. He took up golf as a hobby. Being married with two children, he later married the singer Marianne Antonsen in 2017, settling in Fredrikstad.
