= List of Strømsgodset Toppfotball players =

This list includes football players who play or played at the Norwegian football club Strømsgodset Toppfotball.

== A ==
- Alexander Aas
- Mohammed Abu
- Abdul-Basit Agouda
- Knut Ahlander
- Pål Henning Albertsen
- Paal Alsaker
- Tor Alsaker-Nøstdahl
- Komlan Amewou
- Odd Amundsen
- Bjørn Andersen
- Eirik Andersen
- Geir Andersen
- Glenn Andersen
- Svein Andersen
- Mattias Andersson
- Per Årseth
- Stefan Aškovski
- Krister Aunan

== B ==
- Dmitriy Barannik
- Håvard Beckstrøm
- André Bergdølmo
- Kent Bergersen
- Jo Inge Berget
- Bismark Boateng
- Marius Boldt
- Svein Brandshaug
- Henrik Bredeli
- Simen Brenne
- Jeb Brovsky

== C ==
- Lars-Gunnar Carlstrand
- Behajdin Celina
- Lee Chapman
- Lars Cramer

== D ==
- Ronny Deila
- Adama Diomandé
- Arne Dokken
- Kenneth Dokken
- Corey Donoghue
- David Driscoll

== E ==
- Espen Edvardsen
- Omar Elabdellaoui
- Erik Eriksen
- Arne Erlandsen
- Eivind Evensen
- Vidar Evensen

== F ==
- Espen Falck
- Samir Fazlagić
- Thomas Finstad
- Jostein Flo
- Iver Fossum
- Francisco Santos
- Ole Friise
- Lars Fuhre

== G ==
- Christer George
- Thomas Gill
- Stefán Gíslason
- Valur Gíslason
- Mathias Gjerstrøm
- Jakob Glesnes
- Lars Granås
- Karanveer Grewal
- Bjørn Gulden
- Anders Gundersen
- Mads Gundersen
- Veigar Gunnarsson
- Göksel Güvenc
- Gestur Arnar Gylfason

== H ==
- Erik Hagen
- Rune Hagen
- Bjørn Halvorsen
- Stian Lind Halvorsen
- Mounir Hamoud
- Florent Hanin
- Glenn Hansen
- Vegard Hansen
- André Hanssen
- David Hanssen
- Tor Henriksen
- Mergim Herequi
- Lars Hjelmeseth
- Magnus Hjulstad
- Jan Erik Holmen
- Robert Holmen
- Jørgen Horn
- Andreas Hoven
- Kristoffer Hoven
- Marius Høibråten
- Tommy Høiland
- Keijo Huusko

== I ==
- Abdisalam Ibrahim
- Sunday Ibrahim
- Kåre Ingebrigtsen

== J ==
- Łukasz Jarosiński
- Aleksandrs Jelisejevs
- Garðar Jóhannsson
- Jim Johansen
- Sondre Johansen
- Stefan Johansen
- Erland Johnsen
- Espen Johnsen
- Bassel Jradi

== K ==
- Einar Kalsæg
- Ola Kamara
- Helge Karlsen
- Kenneth Karlsen
- Flamur Kastrati
- Muhamed Keita
- Morten Kihle
- Jon Knudsen
- Anders Konradsen
- Péter Kovács
- Jan Kristiansen
- Juro Kuvicek
- Enock Kwakwa
- Adam Kwarasey

== L ==
- Kim Larsen
- Akeem Latifu
- Marek Lemsalu
- Øyvind Leonhardsen
- Peter Lindau
- Christopher Lindquist
- Stefan Lindqvist
- Trond Ludvigsen
- Trygve Lunde
- Kjetil Lundebakken

== M ==
- Jan Madsen
- Kim Madsen
- Erik Markegård
- Steffen Martinsen
- Arild Mathisen
- Anders Michelsen
- Petter Moen
- Thomas Moen
- Lars Moldskred
- Jason Morrison

== N ==
- Colin N'Kee
- Divine Naah
- Tokmac Nguen
- David Nielsen
- Fredrik Nordkvelle
- Razak Nuhu
- Alpha Nyan
- Ousmane Nyan
- Kenneth Nysæther
- Vidar Nysæther
- Steffen Nystrøm

== O ==
- Marvin Ogunjimi
- Stian Ohr
- Jørgen Oland
- Egil Olsen
- Finn Olsen
- Frode Olsen
- Inge André Olsen
- Lasse Olsen
- Patrick Olsen
- Thomas Olsen
- Trond Olsen
- Boureima Ouattara
- Faso Martin Ovenstad
- Hans Erik Ødegaard
- Martin Ødegaard
- Thomas Ødegaard

== P ==
- Jonathan Parr
- Johnny Pedersen
- Marcus Pedersen
- Steinar Pedersen
- Espen Pettersen
- Ingar Pettersen
- Steinar Pettersen
- Thorodd Presberg

== R ==
- Sead Ramović
- Hermann Rhoden
- Joel Riddez
- Vidar Riseth
- Petar Rnkovic
- Thomas Røed
- Sverre Rørvik
- Mads Ryghseter

== S ==
- Ivar Sandvik
- Alfred Sankoh
- Lars Sætra
- Morten Sætra
- Pål Skistad
- Sander Solberg
- Thomas Solvoll
- Kristian Sørli
- Thomas Sørum
- Bjørn Stephansen
- Jarl André Storbæk
- Øyvind Storflor
- Lars Strand
- Vegard Strøm
- Lars Stubhaug
- Rune Sunde
- Ole Amund Sveen
- Tamás Szekeres

== T ==
- Marco Tagbajumi
- Ibrahima Thiam
- Borger Thomas
- Inge Thun
- Kristoffer Tokstad
- Óskar Hrafn Þorvaldsson

== V ==
- Gustav Valsvik
- Lars-Christopher Vilsvik

== W ==
- Thomas Wæhler
- Øyvind Wibe
- Bård Wiggen
- Gustav Wikheim
- Fredrik Winsnes
- Per Rune Wølner
