= Ole Jonny Friise =

Norwegian sportsperson (1941–2024)

Personal information
- Born: 3 July 1941 Drammen, Reichskommissariat Norwegen (today Norway)
- Died: 30 October 2024 (aged 83)

Sport
- Sport: Bandy; Football
- Club: Strømsgodset IF
Medal record
Men's bandy
Representing Norway
World Championships
Silver medal – second place	1965 Soviet	Team

Ole Jonny Friise (3 July 1941 – 30 October 2024) was a Norwegian bandy player and football player. His achievements include winning six national titles in bandy with Strømsgodset, and one world championship silver medal with the national team. In football, he won the Norwegian Football Cup with Strømsgodset twice, and the Norwegian League once.

== Career ==
Born in Drammen on 3 July 1941, Riise played bandy and football for the club Strømsgodset during his entire career.

In bandy, he won six national titles with Strømsgodset, in 1962, 1963, 1965, 1967, 1968, and 1969. He made his debut for the Norwegian national team on 22 February 1961, at the 1961 Bandy World Championship, in the match against Sweden, played in Herøya in Porsgrunn. He played a total of 51 matches for the national team, and won a silver medal at the 1965 Bandy World Championship, when he also was team captain.

In football, he won two national titles with Strømsgodset, winning the 1969 Norwegian Football Cup and the 1970 Norwegian Football Cup, as well as winning the top league in 1970.

== Personal life ==
His son Henning Friise became a football goalkeeper and played in Norway's top league, albeit not for Strømsgodset. Through his son, Ole Jonny Friise was also the father-in-law of the singer Marianne Antonsen.

Ole Jonny Friise died on 30 October 2024, at the age of 83.
