= Klaas Nuninga =

Dutch footballer

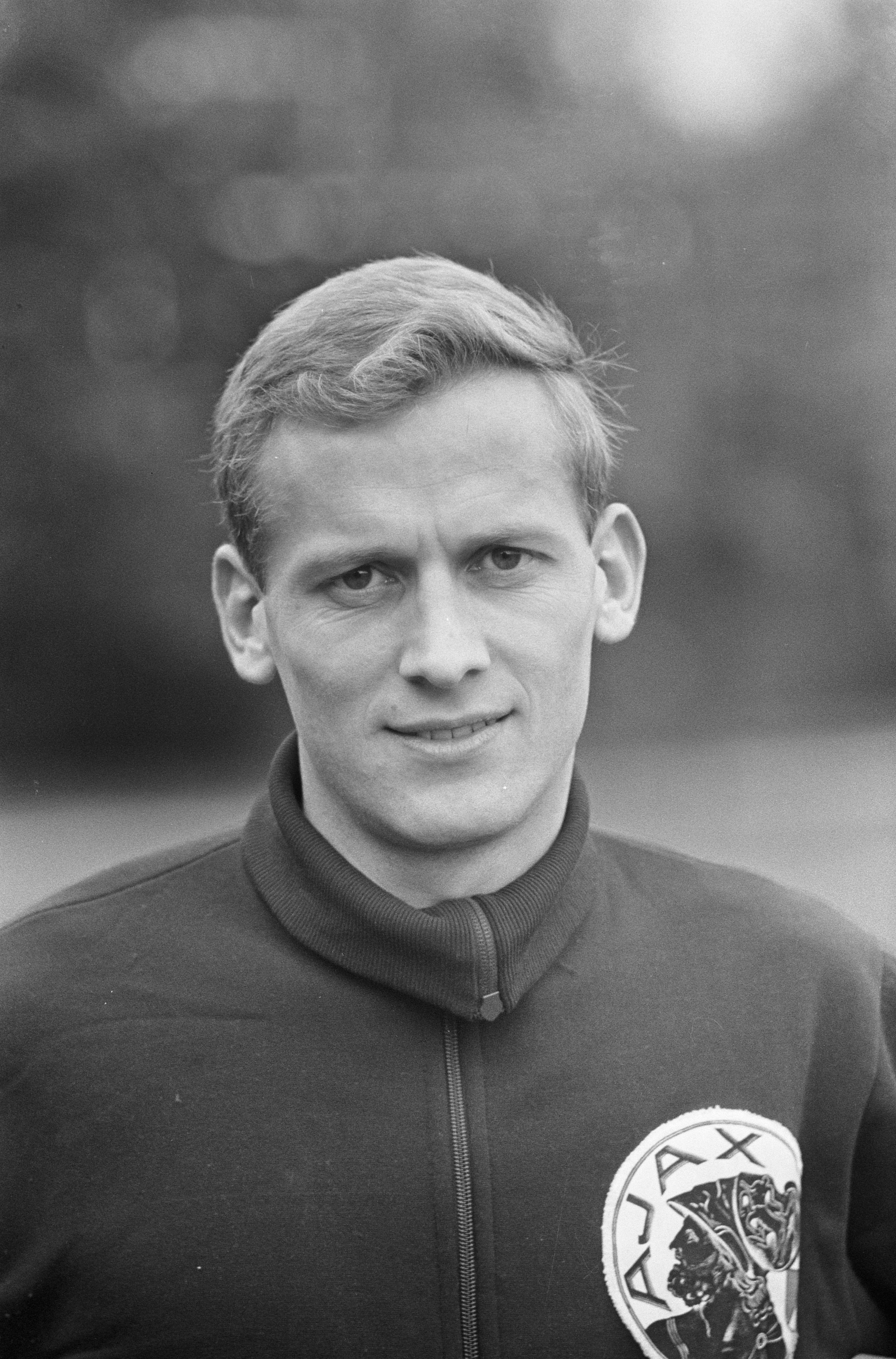
- Nuninga in 1966

Personal information
- Date of birth: 7 November 1940 (age 85)
- Place of birth: Winschoten, Netherlands
- Position: Forward

Youth career
- WVV 1896
- Be Quick 1887

Senior career*
Years	Team	Apps	(Gls)
1961–1964	GVAV-Rapiditas	88	(36)
1964–1969	Ajax	150	(73)
1969–1972	DWS	88	(7)

International career^{‡}
1963–1967	Netherlands	19	(4)
- * Club domestic league appearances and goals as of 28 August 2012 ‡ National team caps and goals as of 28 August 2012

Klaas Nuninga (born 7 November 1940) is a former Dutch international footballer who played for GVAV-Rapiditas, Ajax and DWS during his career.

== Club career ==
=== Early career ===
Nuninga began his career in the youth ranks of WVV 1896 in his home town of Winschoten. It was the same amateur club where Jan Mulder and Arie Haan began their careers. After a move to Be Quick 1887, he was recruited by GVAV-Rapiditas in 1961.

=== GVAV-Rapidistas ===
Starting his professional career in Groningen, with GVAV-Rapiditas, Nuninga played alongside Tonny van Leeuwen and Martin Koeman among others, to make up a pretty competitive side at the time. It was during his playing period in Groningen that Nuninga was called up to play for the Netherlands national team, making a total of 19 appearances.

=== Ajax ===
His talent would not go unnoticed, and in 1964 Nuninga transferred over to Ajax. He participated in the 1968-69 European Cup, as the first choice striker for Ajax, and started in the final, where Ajax would face, and eventually lose to AC Milan (4-1). After this loss, Nuninga was sidelined by then coach Rinus Michels.

=== DWS ===
Remaining in Amsterdam, Nuninga went on to sign with DWS, with whom he would play three more seasons, making 88 appearances, and scoring 7 times before retiring from professional football.

==== Post career ====
After his footballing career, Nuninga delved into business, eventually becoming a member of the board at Ajax, and afterwards the IPO commissioner of Ajax N.V.

In 2005, he stepped down from his position, after a difference in opinion and dispute with then chairman of the board, John Jaakke.

== International career ==
From 1963 to 1967, Nuninga made 19 appearances for the Netherlands national team, scoring a total of 4 goals.

== Career statistics ==
=== International ===
Appearances and goals by national team and year
National team	Year	Apps	Goals
Netherlands	1963	1	1
Netherlands	1964	5	1
Netherlands	1965	1	0
Netherlands	1966	7	2
Netherlands	1967	5	0
Total		19	4

Scores and results list the Netherlands' goal tally first, score column indicates score after each Nuninga goal.

List of international goals scored by Klaas Nuninga
No.	Date	Venue	Opponent	Score	Result	Competition
1	11 September 1963	Olympisch Stadion, Amsterdam, Netherlands	Luxembourg	1–0	1–1	1964 UEFA Euro qualification
2	12 April 1964	Olympisch Stadion, Amsterdam, Netherlands	Austria	1–1	1–1	Friendly
3	23 March 1966	De Kuip, Rotterdam, Netherlands	West Germany	2–3	2–4	Friendly
4	11 May 1966	Hampden Park, Glasgow, Netherlands	Scotland	1–0	3–0	Friendly

== Honours ==
=== Club ===
Ajax

- Eredivisie: 1965–66, 1966–67, 1967–68
- KNVB Cup: 1966–67; runner-up: 1967–68
- European Cup: runner-up 1969
