= Cees de Wolf =

Dutch footballer

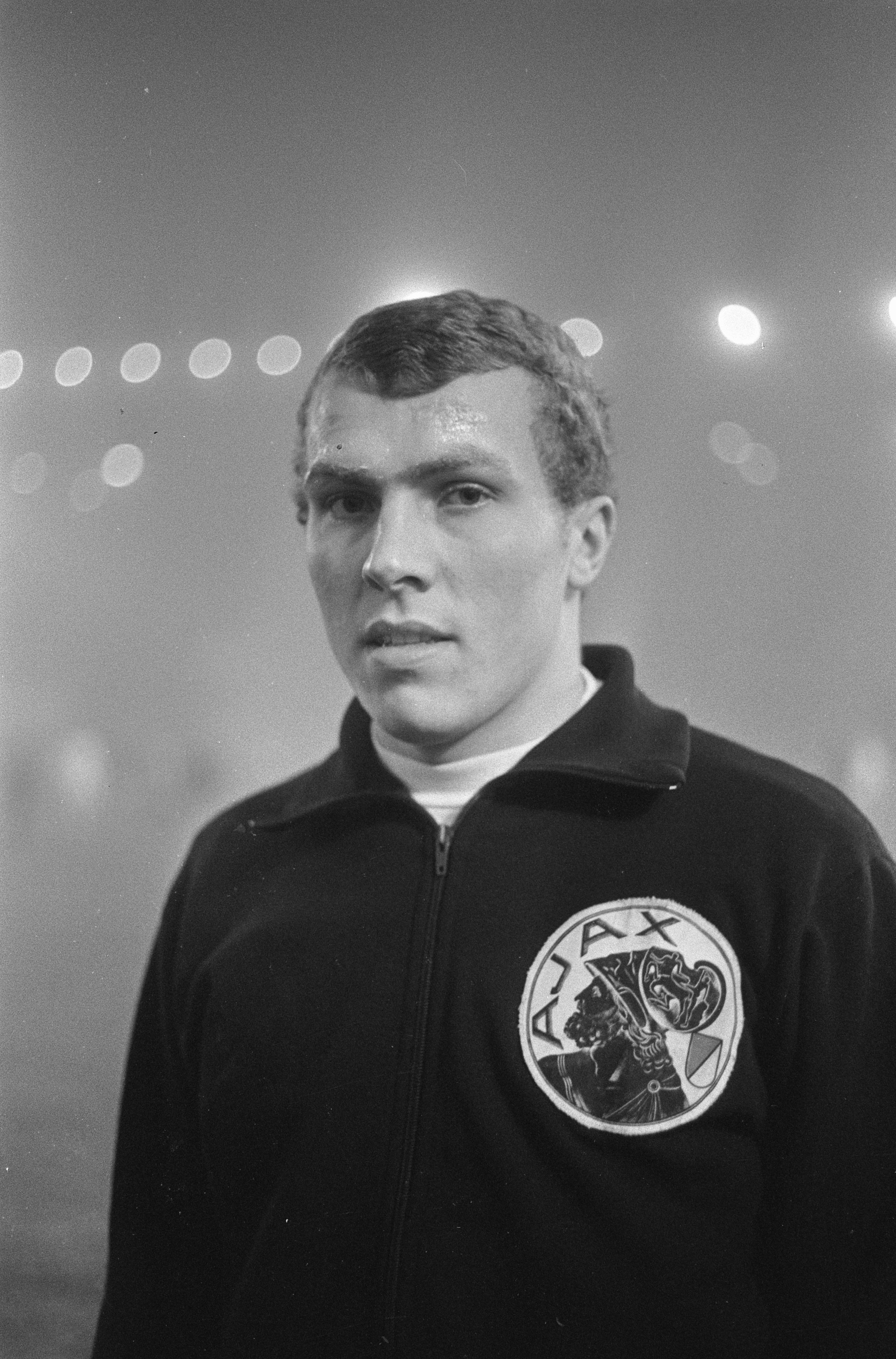
- De Wolf with Ajax in 1966

Personal information
- Date of birth: 17 December 1945
- Place of birth: Purmerend, Netherlands
- Date of death: 21 July 2011 (aged 65)
- Place of death: Purmerend, Netherlands
- Position: Left winger

Senior career*
Years	Team	Apps	(Gls)
1964–1967	Ajax		
1968	Dallas Tornado	9	(3)
1970–1971	Haarlem		
1971–1972	Blauw-Wit		
1972–1975	KV Mechelen		
- * Club domestic league appearances and goals

Cees de Wolf (17 December 1945 – 21 July 2011) was a Dutch professional footballer who played as a left winger.

== Career ==
De Wolf was born in Purmerend. He played in the Netherlands for Ajax, Haarlem and Blauw-Wit, and in Belgium for KV Mechelen. He also played in the North American Soccer League for the Dallas Tornado.
