= Jan Hassink =

Dutch footballer

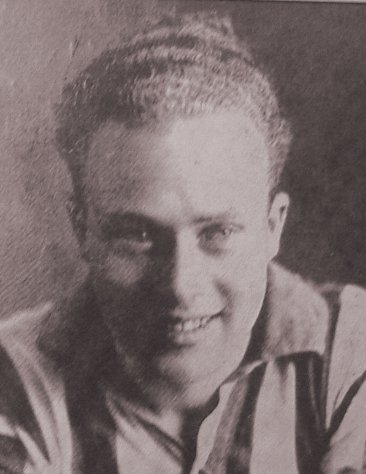

Personal information
- Full name: Jan Hendrik Hassink
- Date of birth: 6 April 1902
- Place of birth: Meppel, Netherlands
- Date of death: 26 July 1927 (aged 25)
- Place of death: Eindhoven, Netherlands
- Height: 1.77 m (5 ft 9 1/2 in)
- Position: Defender

Senior career*
Years	Team	Apps	(Gls)
1923–1925	Ajax	21	(0)
1925–1927	PSV		

International career
1926	Netherlands	2	(0)
- * Club domestic league appearances and goals

Jan Hassink (6 April 1902 – 26 July 1927) was a Dutch footballer. He played in two matches for the Netherlands national football team in 1926.

Hassink played for Ajax before moving to Eindhoven to work in the Philips lightbulb factory. There he joined the company's club PSV. He then became the first ever PSV-player who was to be selected for the national football team.

== Personal life ==
Jan was born in Meppel, the son of Jannes Hassink and Fredrika Andria Bordewijk.

He died in 1927 from injuries sustained in a motorcycle accident.

== Career statistics ==
Club	Season	League		KNVB Cup		Total	
Club	Season	Apps	Goals	Apps	Goals	Apps	Goals
Ajax	1923–24	16	0	—		16	0
Ajax	1924–25	5	0	4	0	9	0
Total		21	0	4	0	25	0

== Sources ==
- Vermeer, Evert; van Hoof, Marcelle (1999). Ajax 100 Jaar Jubileumboek 1900-2000 (in Dutch). Amsterdam: Luitingh-Sijthoff. ISBN 90-245-3497-6.
