= Frits Soetekouw =

Dutch footballer (1938–2019)

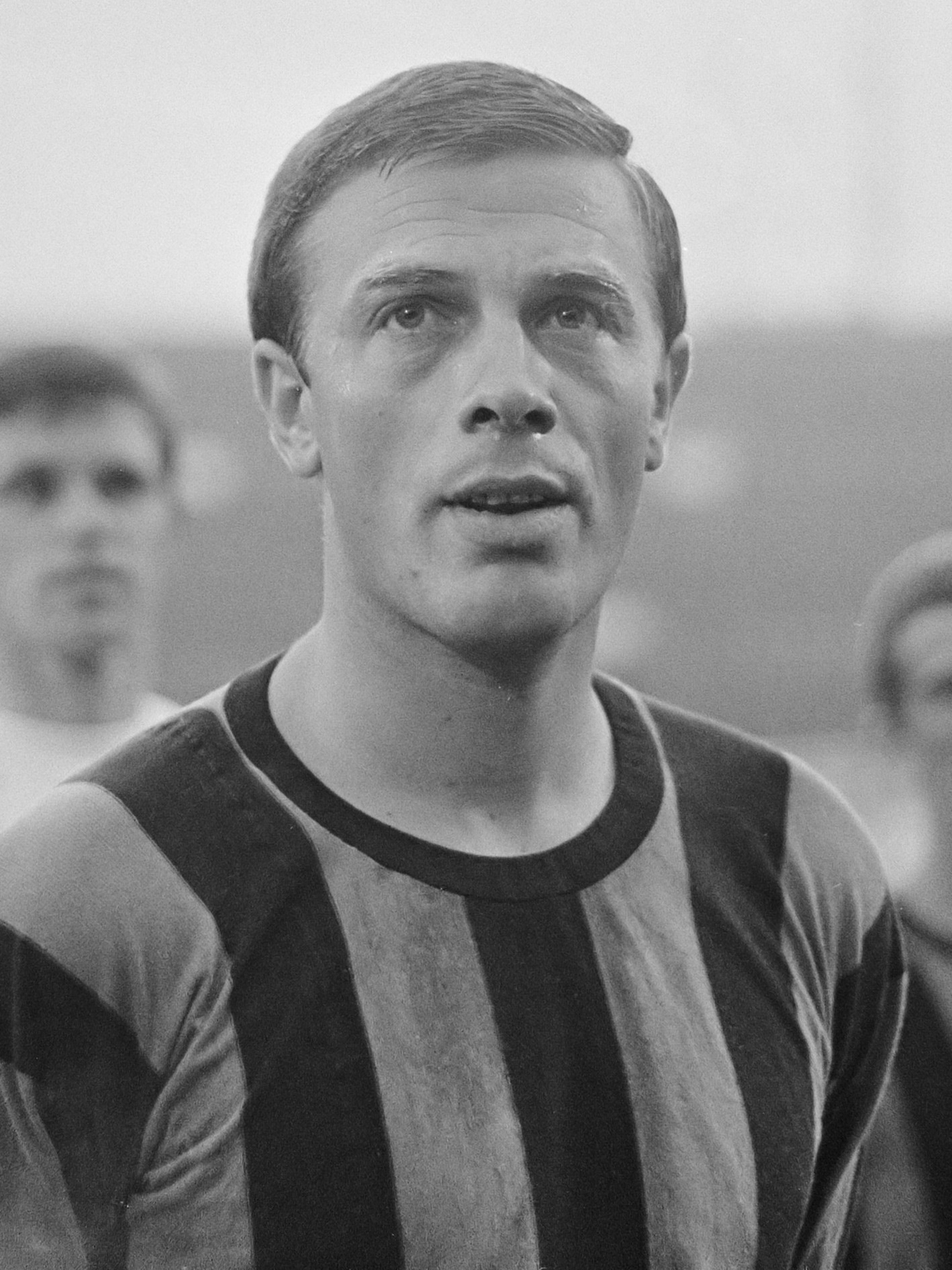
- Soetekouw in 1968

Personal information
- Date of birth: 16 June 1938
- Place of birth: Amsterdam, Netherlands
- Date of death: 3 May 2019 (aged 80)
- Position: Defender

Senior career*
Years	Team	Apps	(Gls)
1961–1963	De Volewijckers	57	(5)
1963–1964	Heracles	13	(0)
1964–1967	Ajax	86	(2)
1967–1968	PSV	32	(0)
1968–1971	DWS	88	(0)
Total		276	(7)

International career
1962	Netherlands	1	(0)
- * Club domestic league appearances and goals

Frits Soetekouw (6 June 1938 – 3 May 2019) was a Dutch footballer who played as a defender.

== Biography ==
Born in Amsterdam, Soetekouw played at club level between 1961 and 1971. He played for De Volewijckers, Heracles, Ajax, PSV and DWS. He briefly captained Ajax, notably in the side's 5–1 win against Liverpool in 1966. He also once appeared for the Netherlands national team in 1962.

Soetekouw died on 3 May 2019, at the age of 80.
