= Anton Pronk =

Dutch footballer (1941–2016)

Tonny Pronk
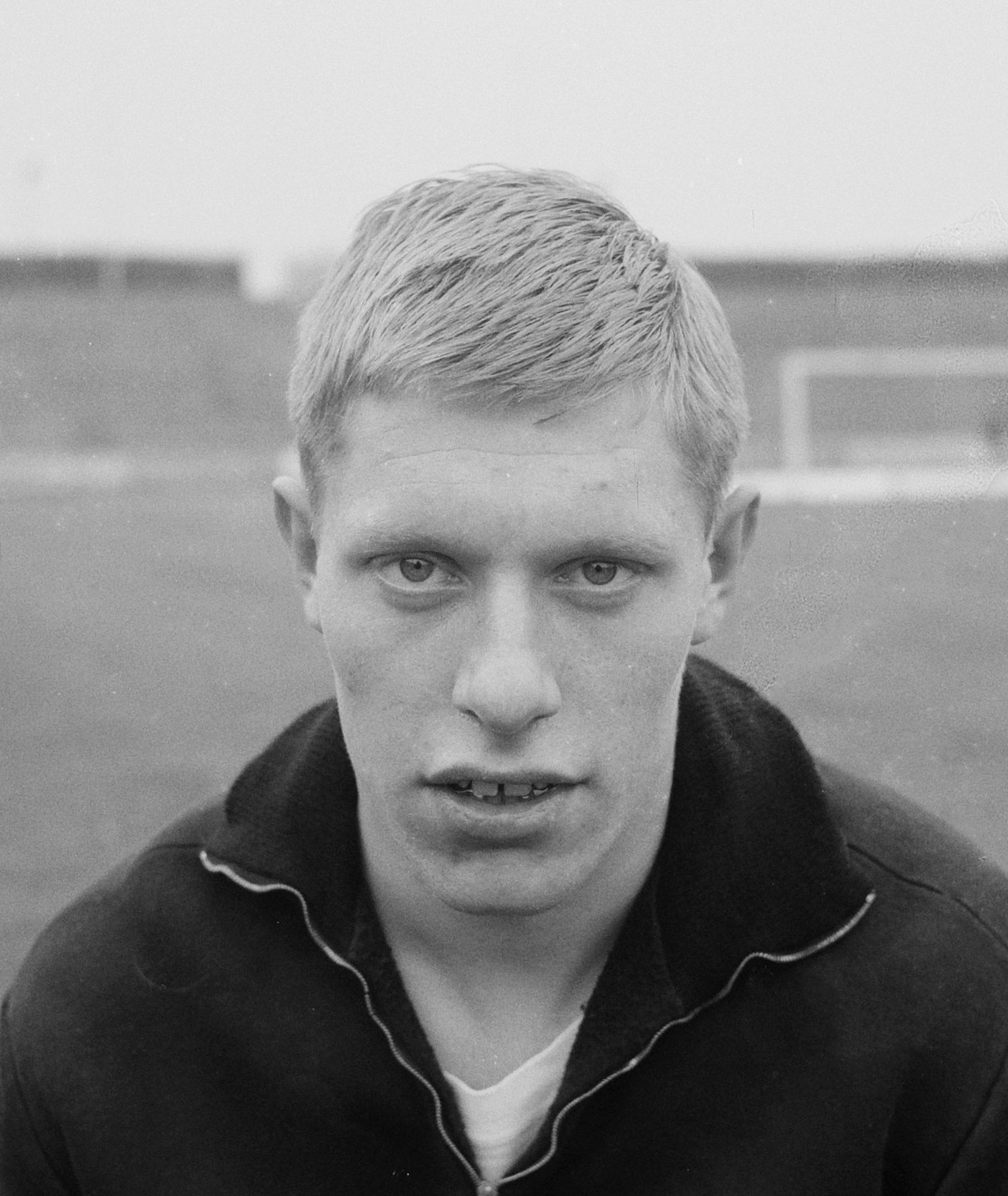
- Anton Pronk in 1961

Personal information
- Full name: Anton Pronk
- Date of birth: 21 April 1941
- Place of birth: Amsterdam, Netherlands
- Date of death: 26 August 2016 (aged 75)
- Place of death: Purmerend, Netherlands
- Position: Defender

Youth career
- 1951–1960: Ajax

Senior career*
Years	Team	Apps	(Gls)
1960–1970	Ajax	337	(8)
1970–1974	FC Utrecht	64	(1)
Total		401	(10)

International career
1961–1969	Netherlands	19	(0)
- * Club domestic league appearances and goals

Anton "Ton" Pronk (21 May 1941 – 26 August 2016) was a Dutch football defender who played for Ajax in the 1960s and for FC Utrecht in the early 1970s.

== Club career ==
Pronk came through the Ajax youth system and made his senior debut for the club on 4 September 1960 against PSV. He played in 337 official matches for them during the 1960s, winning 4 league titles and 3 KNVB Cups. He was on their losing side in the 1969 European Cup Final and was released by Ajax before the club won the Champions's Cup for three successive years in the beginning of the 1970s.

He joined the newly formed FC Utrecht at the end of 1970 and finished his career with them.

== International career ==
He made his debut for the Netherlands in a May 1961 FIFA World Cup qualification match against East Germany and earned a total of 19 caps, scoring no goals. His final international was a May 1969 World Cup qualification against Poland.

== Personal life ==
Pronk married Marjan Meier in 1969. Their son, Robin, used to work as a youth coach for Ajax and FC Utrecht and is currently a coordinator at the academy of Polish club Zagłębie Lubin.

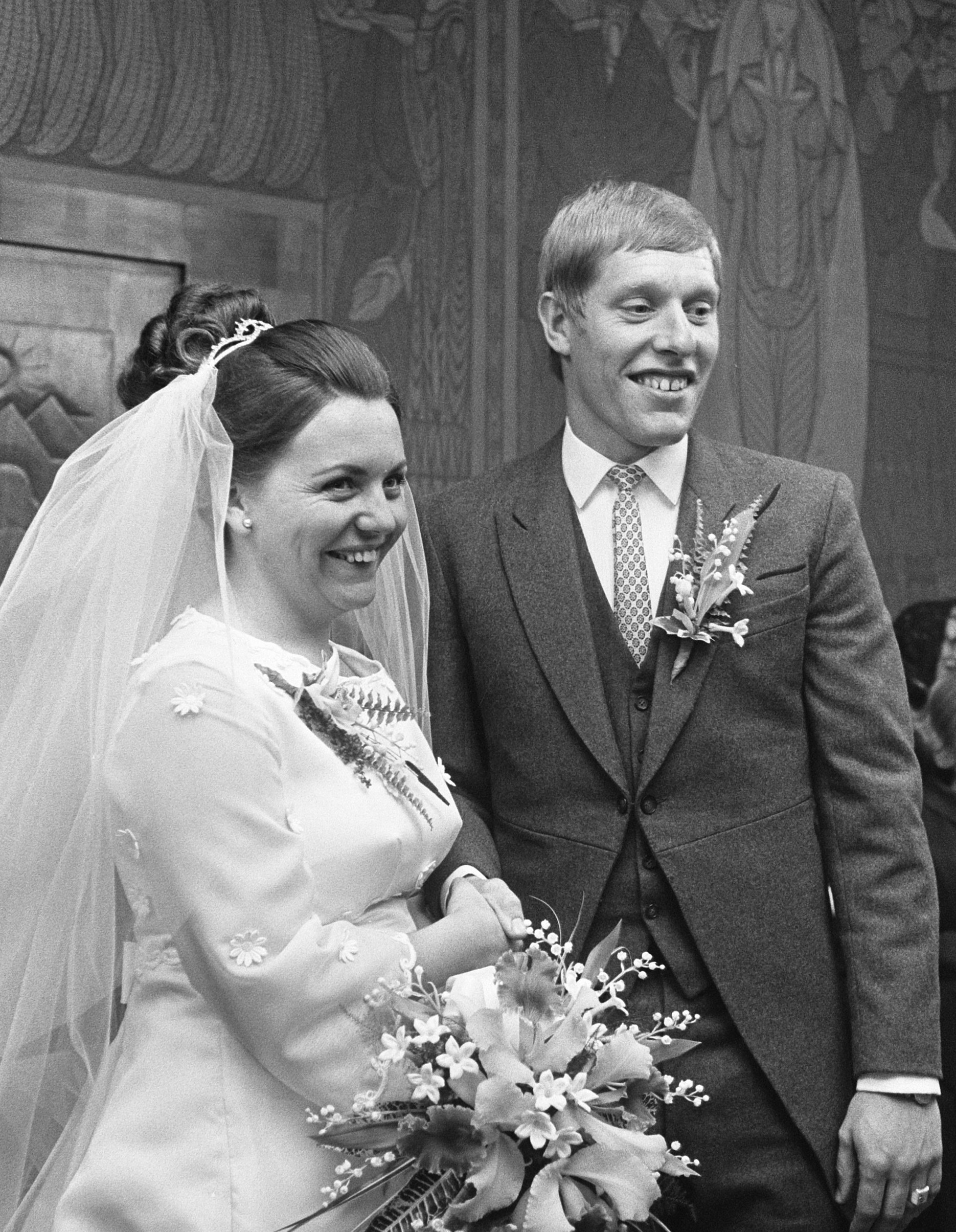
Marjan Meier and Anton Pronk are getting married on 17 November 1969

After retiring as a player, Pronk was appointed as scout at Ajax and Louis van Gaal named him chief scout in 1991 until he retired in 2007. He was honoured by Ajax in 2011 for being member of the club for 60 years and is credited for bringing Jari Litmanen and Zlatan Ibrahimović to the club.

He died of ALS in August 2016 in Purmerend.

== Honours ==
- International Football Cup: 1

1962

- Eredivisie: 4

1966, 1967, 1968, 1970

- KNVB Cup: 3

1961, 1967, 1970
