= Strømsgodset IF =

Norwegian sports club

Strømsgodset
- Full name: Strømsgodset Idrettsforening
- Nickname(s): Godset
- Founded: 10 February 1907; 118 years ago

Strømsgodset IF is a Norwegian multi-sports club from Gulskogen in Drammen. It has sections for association football, handball and bandy, but is best known for the top-level football section known as Strømsgodset Toppfotball, which plays in Eliteserien, the Norwegian top flight.

The club was founded 10 February 1907, but the football team first found success in the late 1960s and early 1970s, winning a league title and three cups. The famous team from the 1960s and 1970s was popularly known as the "Rødgata Boys", after the street most of them lived on. Most of these players were also accomplished bandy players, and Strømsgodset won four national Norwegian Championships in "the winter version of football". Four of the football players collected silver medals in the 1965 Bandy World Championship; Steinar Pettersen, Inge Thun, Thorodd Presberg and Ole Johnny Friise.

== Bandy ==
Strømsgodset has an amateur bandy team for men. The team was promoted in 2014/15, and will play in Norwegian 2nd division in the 2015/16 season. The team was reestablished in 2013, after a 20-year break. They were six times Norwegian Champions before discontinuing.

== Football ==
Strømsgodset IF has a professional football section, Strømsgodset Toppfotball, which has teams in the Norwegian top flight, Eliteserien, as well as reserve teams in the 2nd and 3rd divisions as of 2015. The club also has a youth division with teams from ages 7 and up to 19, and an amateur men's team in the 5th division. The club also has a women's section.

== Handball ==
The section for handball has a senior woman's team in the 3rd division, as well as youth teams for players 11 and up.

== Achievements ==
=== Football ===
- Norwegian top flight:
  - Winners (2): 1970, 2013
  - Runners-up (1): 2012, 2015
- Norwegian Cup: (The Norwegian Championship)
  - Winners (5): 1969, 1970, 1973, 1991, 2010
  - Runners-up (2): 1993, 1997
- 1. divisjon:
  - Winners (1): 2006

== See also ==
- List of Strømsgodset IF players
