= 1969 European Cup final =

- The match programme cover
- Event: 1968–69 European Cup
Ajax	Milan
(Netherlands)	(Italy)
1	4
- Date: 28 May 1969
- Venue: Santiago Bernabéu, Madrid
- Referee: José María Ortiz de Mendíbil (Spain)
- Attendance: 31,782

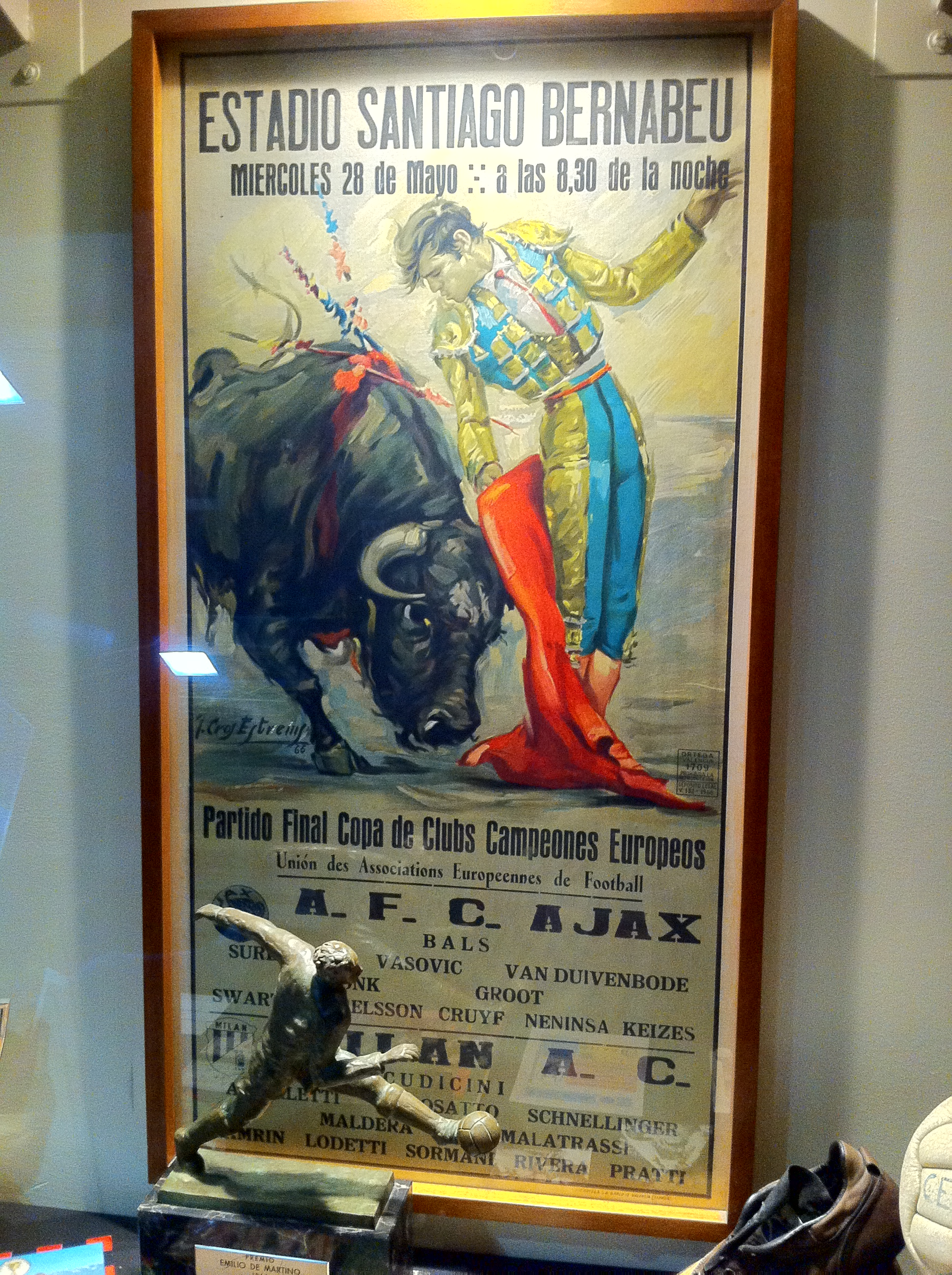
Advertising poster for the game

The 1969 European Cup final was a football match played at the Santiago Bernabéu Stadium in Madrid on 28 May 1969 between Ajax of the Netherlands and AC Milan of Italy, to determine the champions of the 1968–69 European Cup. Ajax made history by becoming the first Dutch side to reach the final, but they were beaten by their Italian opponents 4–1.

As of 2025, Milan's Pierino Prati remains the most recent player to score a hat-trick in a European Cup or Champions League final.

== Route to the final ==
In the quarter-finals, Ajax were deadlocked 4–4 on aggregate against Portuguese side Benfica after two legs, forcing a replay. The Dutch champions won 3–0 in the replay, but it took extra time to do so.

Milan had a bye in the second round due to the withdrawal of a number of Eastern European clubs from the competition. In their semi-final, they knocked out defending European champions Manchester United.

Ajax				Round	Milan				
Opponent	Agg.	1st leg	2nd leg	Play-off		Opponent	Agg.	1st leg	2nd leg
(West Germany) Nürnberg	5–1	1–1 (A)	4–0 (H)		First round	(Sweden) Malmö FF	5–3	1–2 (A)	4–1 (H)
(Turkey) Fenerbahçe	4–0	2–0 (H)	2–0 (A)		Second round	Bye			
(Portugal) Benfica	4–4 (r)	3–1 (A)	1–3 (a.e.t.) (H)	3–0 (a.e.t.)	Quarter-finals	(Scotland) Celtic	1–0	0–0 (H)	1–0 (A)
(Czechoslovakia) Spartak Trnava	3–2	3–0 (H)	0–2 (A)		Semi-finals	(England) Manchester United	2–1	2–0 (H)	0–1 (A)

== Match ==
=== Details ===
28 May 1969
19:30

Ajax (Netherlands)	1–4	(Italy) Milan
Vasović 61' (pen.)	Report	Prati 7', 39', 74'; Sormani 66'

Santiago Bernabéu, Madrid
Attendance: 31,782
Referee: José María Ortiz de Mendíbil (Spain)

Ajax	Milan

GK	1	(Netherlands) Gert Bals
RB	2	(Netherlands) Wim Suurbier	(substituted off) 46'
CB	3	(Netherlands) Barry Hulshoff
CB	4	(Socialist Federal Republic of Yugoslavia) Velibor Vasović (c)
LB	5	(Netherlands) Theo van Duivenbode
RH	6	(Netherlands) Henk Groot	(substituted off) 46'
LH	7	(Netherlands) Ton Pronk
RW	8	(Netherlands) Sjaak Swart
CF	9	(Sweden) Inge Danielsson
CF	10	(Netherlands) Johan Cruyff
LW	11	(Netherlands) Piet Keizer
Substitutes:
FW	12	(Netherlands) Klaas Nuninga	(substituted on) 46'
MF	14	(Netherlands) Bennie Muller	(substituted on) 46'
GK	13	(Netherlands) Heinz Stuy
MF		(Netherlands) Gerrie Mühren
MF		(Netherlands) Ruud Suurendonk
Manager:
(Netherlands) Rinus Michels

GK	1	(Italy) Fabio Cudicini
RB	2	(Italy) Angelo Anquilletti
LB	3	(West Germany) Karl-Heinz Schnellinger
RH	4	(Italy) Roberto Rosato
CH	5	(Italy) Saul Malatrasi
LH	6	(Italy) Giovanni Trapattoni
OR	7	(Sweden) Kurt Hamrin
IR	8	(Italy) Giovanni Lodetti
CF	9	(Italy) Angelo Sormani
IL	10	(Italy) Gianni Rivera (c)
OL	11	(Italy) Pierino Prati
Manager:
(Italy) Nereo Rocco

== See also ==
- 1968–69 AC Milan season
- 1969 European Cup Winners' Cup final
- 1969 Inter-Cities Fairs Cup final
- 1969 Intercontinental Cup
- 1995 UEFA Champions League final – contested by the same teams
- AFC Ajax in international football
- AC Milan in international football
