= Gert Bals =

Dutch footballer

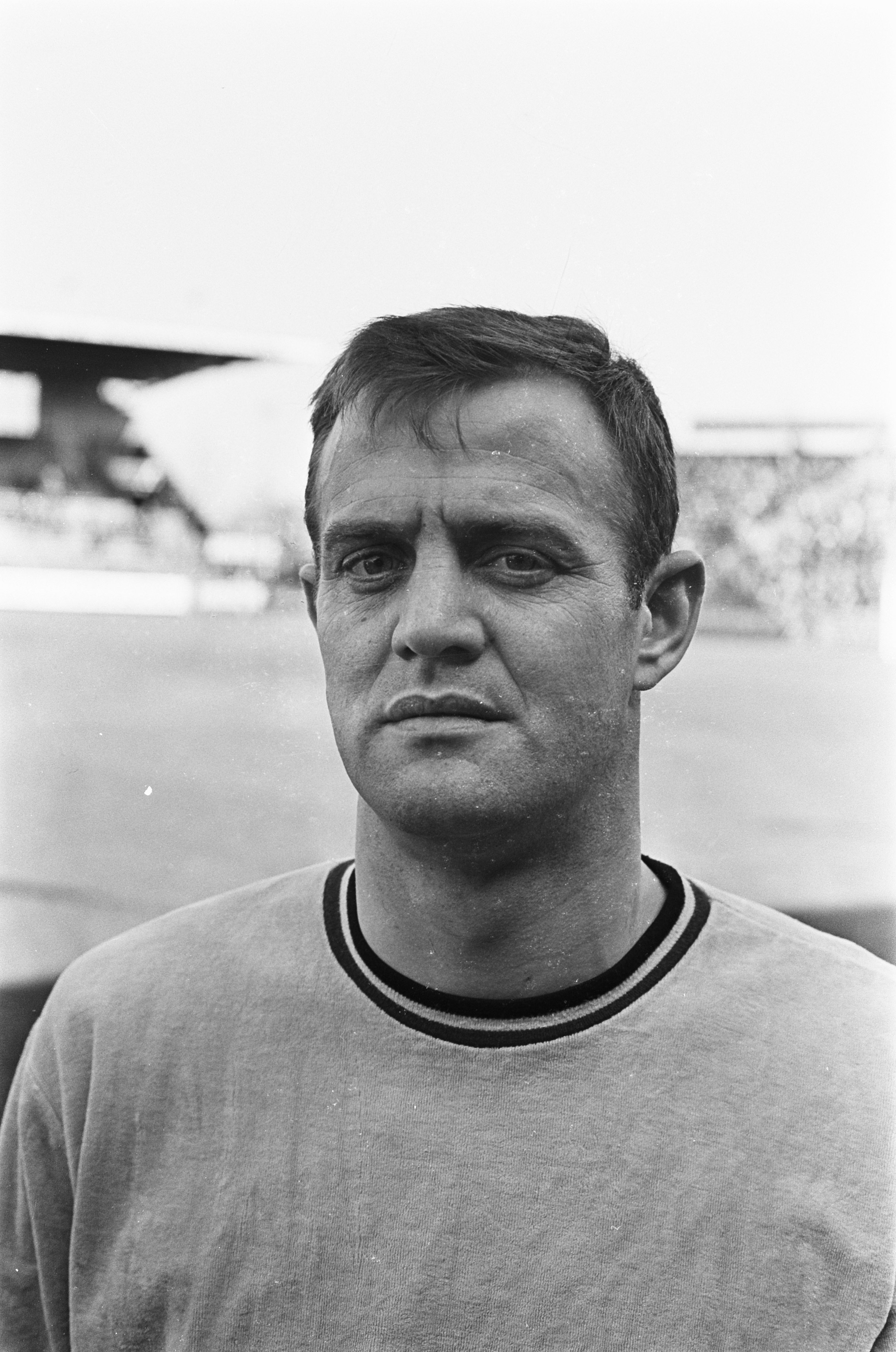
- Bals in 1968

Personal information
- Full name: Gerrit Bals
- Date of birth: 18 October 1936
- Place of birth: Utrecht, Netherlands
- Date of death: 20 May 2016 (aged 79)
- Place of death: Veenendaal, Netherlands
- Position: Goalkeeper

Youth career
- 1947-1955: Velox

Senior career*
Years	Team	Apps	(Gls)
1956–1957	Zeist	25	(0)
1957–1961	't Gooi	117	(0)
1961–1965	PSV	120	(0)
1965–1970	Ajax	162	(0)
1970–1973	Vitesse	84	(0)
Total		508	(0)
- * Club domestic league appearances and goals

Gerrit "Gert" Bals (18 October 1936 – 20 May 2016) was a Dutch footballer who played as a goalkeeper.

Bals became the first Dutch goalkeeper in an UEFA Cup final, when he played for Ajax in the 1969 European Cup Final against Milan.

== Club career ==
Born in Utrecht, Bals played for local side RUC and Velox before joining SV Zeist when they entered at the start of the professional era in Holland. After a spell at 't Gooi, he moved to PSV for whom he would play 120 matches winning the 1963 league title and later Ajax whom he joined for a fee of 72 thousand guilders.

He played 216 official matches for Ajax after making his debut for them in August 1965 and won 4 league titles with the club. He won the Dutch Footballer of the Year Award in 1969.

He finished his career at Vitesse after losing Ajax´ number one jersey to Heinz Stuy in 1970.

== Personal life ==
After retiring as a player, Bals owned a sportshop in Velp and later a tobacco shop in Veenendaal. He died in May 2016.
