= 1986–87 AFC Ajax season =

Dutch football club season

Ajax
1986–87 season
- Chairman: Ton Harmsen
- Head coach: Johan Cruyff
- Stadium: Olympic Stadium; De Meer Stadion
- Eredivisie: 2nd
- KNVB Cup: Winners
- European Cup Winners' Cup: Winners
- Top goalscorer: League: Marco van Basten (31); All: Marco van Basten (44)
- Highest home attendance: 42,000
- Average home league attendance: 12.882
colours	colours

During the 1986–87 Dutch football season, Ajax competed in the Eredivisie, KNVB Cup and the European Cup Winners' Cup.

== Management ==
Position	Staff
Head coach	(Netherlands) Johan Cruyff
Assistant coach	(Netherlands) Bobby Haarms
Fitness coach	(Netherlands) Pim van Dord

== Squad ==
Squad at end of season

Note: Flags indicate national team as defined under FIFA eligibility rules; some limited exceptions apply. Players may hold more than one non-FIFA nationality.

No.	Pos.	Nation	Player
1	GK	NED	Stanley Menzo
2	DF	NED	Danny Blind
4	DF	NED	Frank Verlaat
5	DF	NED	Frank Rijkaard
—	DF	NED	Peter Boeve
11	MF	NED	Aron Winter
7	FW	NED	John van 't Schip
6	MF	NED	Jan Wouters
9	FW	NED	Marco van Basten
—	MF	NED	Arnold Mühren
—	FW	NED	Rob Witschge
3	DF	NED	Sonny Silooy
—	DF	NED	Ronald Spelbos

No.	Pos.	Nation	Player
—	MF	FIN	Petri Tiainen
10	FW	NED	Dennis Bergkamp
—	MF	NED	Arnold Scholten
8	MF	NED	Richard Witschge
—	FW	NED	John Bosman
—	MF	SCO	Ally Dick
—	DF	NED	Desmond Gemert
—	DF	NED	Edo Ophof
—	MF	AUS	Mike Petersen
—	DF	NED	Walter Smak
—	MF	NED	Richard Sneekes
—	GK	NED	Erik de Haan

=== Out on loan ===
Note: Flags indicate national team as defined under FIFA eligibility rules; some limited exceptions apply. Players may hold more than one non-FIFA nationality.

No.	Pos.	Nation	Player
—	GK	NED	Fred Grim (on loan to Cambuur)
—	GK	NED	Hans Galjé (on loan to Utrecht)

== Competitions ==
=== Overall record ===
Competition	First match	Last match	Starting round	Final position	Record							
Competition	First match	Last match	Starting round	Final position	Pld	W	D	L	GF	GA	GD	Win %
Eredivisie	23 September 1986	7 June 1987	Matchday 1	2nd	34	25	3	6	92	30	+62	73.53
KNVB Cup	11 October 1986	5 June 1987	First round	Winners	7	6	1	0	19	6	+13	85.71
European Cup Winners' Cup	17 September 1986	13 May 1987	First round	Winners	9	7	1	1	22	5	+17	77.78
Total					50	38	5	7	133	41	+92	76.00

Source: Competitions

=== Eredivisie ===
Pos	Team	Pld	W	D	L	GF	GA	GD	Pts	Qualification or relegation
1	PSV	34	27	5	2	99	21	+78	59	European Cup
2	Ajax	34	25	3	6	92	30	+62	53	Cup Winners' Cup (Note: Ajax won the Cup Winners' Cup tournament of this year, so two (instead of one) Dutch teams were allowed to participate in next year's edition: cupholders Ajax and the winner of the KNVB Cup. Since Ajax also won the KNVB Cup, finalists FC Den Haag would be the second participants in Cup Winners' Cup next year.)
3	Feyenoord	34	15	12	7	73	43	+30	42	UEFA Cup
4	Roda JC	34	15	9	10	51	45	+6	39	Play-offs UEFA Cup
5	VVV	34	10	17	7	46	45	+1	37	Play-offs UEFA Cup
6	FC Utrecht	34	15	6	13	62	56	+6	36	Play-offs UEFA Cup
7	FC Twente	34	12	12	10	39	44	−5	36	Play-offs UEFA Cup
8	Sparta	34	11	12	11	52	48	+4	34	
9	Fortuna Sittard	34	10	12	12	47	49	−2	32	
10	FC Den Bosch	34	10	12	12	43	52	−9	32	
11	PEC Zwolle	34	10	11	13	61	57	+4	31	
12	HFC Haarlem	34	11	9	14	32	57	−25	31	
13	FC Groningen	34	9	12	13	43	43	0	30	
14	FC Den Haag	34	8	12	14	46	64	−18	28	Cup Winners' Cup
15	AZ	34	7	13	14	31	57	−26	27	
16	Go Ahead Eagles	34	5	13	16	23	48	−25	23	Relegation to Eerste Divisie
17	SC Veendam	34	4	15	15	37	67	−30	23	Relegation to Eerste Divisie
18	Excelsior	34	5	9	20	40	91	−51	19	Relegation to Eerste Divisie

Source: rsssf.com

==== Results summary ====
Overall								Home						Away					
Pld	W	D	L	GF	GA	GD	Pts	W	D	L	GF	GA	GD	W	D	L	GF	GA	GD
34	25	3	6	92	30	+62	78	14	1	2	54	13	+41	11	2	4	38	17	+21

Source: Eredivisie

==== Matches ====
(Note: Match fixtures follow dates played, as opposed to KNVB's original fixture order. Several fixtures were rescheduled.)

24 August 1986 1	Haarlem	0–3	Ajax	Haarlem
CEST (UTC+2)		Report	Rijkaard 56' van Basten 77'; Spelbos 80'; Wouters (yellow card)	Stadium: Haarlem Stadion; Referee: Ignace van Swieten

27 August 1986 2	Ajax	2–3	Den Haag	Amsterdam
CEST (UTC+2)	van Basten 75' (pen.), 82' van 't Schip (yellow card)	Report	Groenendijk 22'; Morley 72' (pen.); Otto 76'; Boere (yellow card)	Stadium: Olympic Stadium; Referee: Egbert Mulder

31 August 1986 3	Ajax	3–0	PSV	Amsterdam
CEST (UTC+2)	Winter 14' van Basten 40', 62'	Report	van der Gijp (yellow card); Gullit (yellow card)	Stadium: Olympic Stadium; Referee: Jan Keizer

3 September 1986 4	Excelsior	0–2	Ajax	Rotterdam
CEST (UTC+2)	Wasiman (yellow card)	Report	Bosman 49'; Rijkaard 51'	Stadium: Stadion Woudestein; Referee: Martin Bannet

7 September 1986 5	Sparta Rotterdam	2–6	Ajax	Rotterdam
CEST (UTC+2)	Lengkeek 38'; Böckling 83'	Report	Bosman 16', 28' van Basten 47', 53', 65'; Rijkaard 88' (yellow card)	Stadium: Sparta Stadion; Referee: Gerard Geurds

14 September 1986 6	Ajax	0–0	Groningen	Amsterdam
CEST (UTC+2)	Silooy (yellow card)	Report		Stadium: De Meer Stadion; Referee: Ignace van Swieten

21 September 1986 7	Ajax	3–2	Go Ahead Eagles	Amsterdam
CEST (UTC+2)	van Basten 2', 14' (pen.) (yellow card); Bosman 74'	Report	Small 17'; Hofstede 22'; Voskamp (yellow card)	Stadium: De Meer Stadion; Referee: Chris van der Laar

24 September 1986 8	Roda JC	1–1	Ajax	Kerkrade
CEST (UTC+2)	Meijer 17'	Report	Wouters 31'	Stadium: Kaalheide; Referee: Ignace van Swieten

28 September 1986 9	Veendam	0–1	Ajax	Veendam
CET (UTC+1)		Report	Rijkaard 41'; Silooy (yellow card)	Stadium: De Langeleegte; Referee: Cees Bakker

5 October 1986 10	Ajax	6–2	Fortuna Sittard	Amsterdam
CET (UTC+1)	van Basten 34'; Bosman 37', 70', 73'; Dick 75'; Mühren 84'	Report	Janssen 54'; Holverda 83'	Stadium: De Meer Stadion; Referee: Jaap van der Niet

19 October 1986 11	Ajax	4–0	VVV	Amsterdam
CET (UTC+1)	Mühren 29'; Witschge 34'; Blind 85', 90'	Report		Stadium: De Meer Stadion; Referee: John Blankenstein

26 October 1986 12	AZ	1–6	Ajax	Alkmaar
CET (UTC+1)	Tiktak 88'	Report	Bosman 10', 28', 54', 62'; Boeve 72' van Basten 90'	Stadium: Alkmaarderhout; Referee: Jan Hobé

29 October 1986 13	Ajax	3–0	Utrecht	Amsterdam
CET (UTC+1)	van Basten 20' van 't Schip 25'; Bosman 44'	Report	Fraser (yellow card) du Chatinier (yellow card) van Loen (yellow card)	Stadium: De Meer Stadion; Referee: Jan Keizer

2 November 1986 14	Feyenoord	2–3	Ajax	Rotterdam
CET (UTC+1)	Been 11'; Barendse 52'; Hoekstra (yellow card)	Report	Witschge 2', 65' van Basten 21'	Stadium: De Kuip; Referee: Henk van Ettekoven

9 November 1986 15	Ajax	3–1	Den Bosch	Amsterdam
CET (UTC+1)	Bosman 14' (yellow card); Wouters 36' van Basten 71'	Report	Gillhaus 48'	Stadium: De Meer Stadion; Referee: John Blankenstein

22 November 1986 16	PEC Zwolle	0–1	Ajax	Zwolle
CET (UTC+1)	Booy (yellow card)	Report	van Basten 78'	Stadium: Oosterenkstadion; Referee: Chris Verhoef

30 November 1986 17	Ajax	4–0	Twente	Amsterdam
CET (UTC+1)	van Basten 8', 46'; Bosman 34', 58'	Report	ten Caat (yellow card)	Stadium: De Meer Stadion; Referee: Martin Bannet

7 December 1986 18	Groningen	0–3	Ajax	Groningen
CET (UTC+1)		Report	Winter 66', 68'; Boeve 86'	Stadium: Stadion Oosterpark; Referee: Gerard Geurds

14 December 1986 19	Ajax	2–0	Roda JC	Amsterdam
CET (UTC+1)	Bosman 50'; Winter 52'	Report	Hanssen (yellow card)	Stadium: De Meer Stadion; Referee: Egbert Mulder

15 February 1987 20	VVV	3–0	Ajax	Venlo
CET (UTC+1)	Valckx 29'; Luhukay 59'; Reynierse 84' (pen.) van 't Schip (yellow card)	Report		Stadium: De Koel; Referee: Ignace van Swieten

20 February 1987 21	Ajax	6–0	Haarlem	Amsterdam
CET (UTC+1)	Mühren 20'; Rijkaard 21'; Spelbos 25' (pen.); Bergkamp 64'; Winter 80'; Blind 86'	Report		Stadium: De Meer Stadion; Referee: Jan Hobé

1 March 1987 22	Den Haag	0–2	Ajax	The Hague
CET (UTC+1)		Report	Bosman 3', 25'; Winter (yellow card)	Stadium: Zuiderpark Stadium; Referee: Henk van Ettekoven

8 March 1987 23	Ajax	3–0	Excelsior	Amsterdam
CET (UTC+1)	Blind 47' van Basten 52'; Winter 81'; Wouters (yellow card)	Report	Latuheru (yellow card); Wasiman (yellow card)	Stadium: De Meer Stadion; Referee: Cees Bakker

21 March 1987 24	Ajax	3–0	Sparta Rotterdam	Amsterdam
CET (UTC+1)	van Basten 6', 82'; Winter 75'	Report	van Stee (yellow card); Diliberto (yellow card)	Stadium: De Meer Stadion; Referee: Jan Keizer

29 March 1987 25	PSV	1–0	Ajax	Eindhoven
CEST (UTC+2)	Gullit 82'; Gerets (yellow card) (yellow-red card)	Report	Blind (yellow card) van 't Schip (yellow card)	Stadium: Philips Stadion; Referee: John Blankenstein

5 April 1987 26	Go Ahead Eagles	1–1	Ajax	Deventer
CEST (UTC+2)	Small 44'	Report	Rijkaard 3'; Witschge (yellow card)	Stadium: De Adelaarshorst; Referee: Gerard Geurds

12 April 1987 27	Ajax	4–0	Veendam	Amsterdam
CEST (UTC+2)	Wouters 19', 31' van Basten 57' (pen.), 65'	Report	de Haan (yellow card)	Stadium: De Meer Stadion; Referee: Jan Hobé

19 April 1987 28	Fortuna Sittard	1–3	Ajax	Sittard
CEST (UTC+2)	Lens 75'; Duut (yellow card)	Report	Bergkamp 43'; Winter 53'; Scholten 60'	Stadium: De Baandert; Referee: Martin Bannet

2 May 1987 29	Ajax	2–0	AZ	Amsterdam
CEST (UTC+2)	Rijkaard 27' van Basten 82'	Report		Stadium: De Meer Stadion; Referee: Gerard Geurds

10 May 1987 30	Utrecht	2–1	Ajax	Utrecht
CEST (UTC+2)	Willaarts 42'; Plomp 46' (pen.)	Report	Bosman 78' (yellow card)	Stadium: Stadion Galgenwaard; Referee: Jan Keizer

17 May 1987 31	Ajax	1–3	Feyenoord	Amsterdam
CEST (UTC+2)	van Basten 80' (pen.)	Report	Hofman 9'; Winter 55' (o.g.); Been 82'; Troost (yellow card); Tahamata (yellow card)	Stadium: Olympic Stadium; Referee: Ignace van Swieten

24 May 1987 32	Den Bosch	1–4	Ajax	's-Hertogenbosch
CEST (UTC+2)	Krüzen 47' van Eck (yellow card) van der Hoorn (yellow card)	Report	van Basten 38', 87' (pen.); Bosman 68', 81'	Stadium: De Vliert; Referee: Egbert Mulder

31 May 1987 33	Ajax	5–2	PEC Zwolle	Amsterdam
CEST (UTC+2)	van Basten 18', 31', 80', 83' (pen.); Bosman 33'	Report	Booy 38', 74'	Stadium: De Meer Stadion; Referee: Wim Egbertzen

8 June 1987 34	Twente	2–1	Ajax	Enschede
CEST (UTC+2)	Groeleken 9', 57'	Report	Bosman 53'	Stadium: Diekman Stadion; Referee: Egbert Mulder

=== KNVB Cup ===
11 October 1986 First round	Elinkwijk	1–4	Ajax	Utrecht
CET (UTC+1)			van Basten 20', 36'; Bosman 34'; Dick 43'	Stadium: Sportpark Elinkwijk; Referee: Jan Dolstra

16 November 1986 Second round	VV Rheden	0–2	Ajax	Rheden
CET (UTC+1)			van Basten 56'; Winter 76'; Rijkaard (yellow card)	Stadium: Sportpark IJsselzicht; Referee: Roelof Luinge

11 March 1987 Round of 16	Sparta Rotterdam	0–0 (a.e.t.) (3 - 4 p)	Ajax	Rotterdam
CET (UTC+1)			Spelbos (yellow card)	Stadium: Sparta Stadion; Referee: Egbert Mulder
	Penalties
	Eger (penalty missed); Olde Riekerink (penalty scored); Steur (penalty scored); Ellerman (penalty scored); Böckling (penalty missed) de Kant (penalty missed); Lengkeek (penalty missed)		Mühren (penalty missed); Bosman (penalty scored); Spelbos (penalty missed); Rijkaard (penalty scored); Blind (penalty scored); Silooy (penalty missed); Wouters (penalty scored)

1 April 1987 Quarter-finals	Ajax	2–0	Vitesse Arnhem	Amsterdam
CEST (UTC+2)	Bosman 9' (yellow card) van Basten 75'			Stadium: De Meer Stadion; Referee: Jaap van der Niet

5 May 1987 Semi-finals	Ajax	0–0	Groningen	Amsterdam
CEST (UTC+2)				Stadium: De Meer Stadion; Referee: John Blankenstein

19 May 1987 Semi-finals Replay	Groningen	0–3	Ajax	Groningen
CEST (UTC+2)			van Basten 68'; Verlaat 75'; Bosman 81' van 't Schip (yellow card)	Stadium: Stadion Oosterpark; Referee: Henk van Ettekoven

5 June 1987 Final	Den Haag	2–4 (a.e.t.)	Ajax	The Hague
CEST (UTC+2)	Boere 43'; Morley 66'		Bosman 11', 83' van Basten 104', 106'	Stadium: Zuiderpark Stadium; Referee: Ignace van Swieten

=== European Cup Winners' Cup ===
==== First round ====
17 September 1986 First leg	Bursaspor (Turkey)	0–2	(Netherlands) Ajax	Bursa Atatürk Stadium, Bursa
16:00 CEST		Report	Bosman 73' van Basten 86'	Attendance: 6,500; Referee: Pavel Kuznetsov (Soviet Union)

1 October 1986 Second leg	Ajax (Netherlands)	5–0 (7–0 agg.)	(Turkey) Bursaspor	De Meer Stadion, Amsterdam
20:15 CET	Bosman 17', 21', 34', 89' van Basten 24'	Report		Attendance: 18,044; Referee: Ildefonso Urizar Azpitarte (Spain)

==== Second round ====
22 October 1986 First leg	Ajax (Netherlands)	4–0	(Greece) Olympiacos	De Meer Stadion, Amsterdam
20:15 CET	Bosman 6'; Rijkaard 44' van Basten 52'; Mühren 83'	Report		Attendance: 21,981; Referee: Siegfried Kirschen (East Germany)

5 November 1986 Second leg	Olympiacos (Greece)	1–1 (1–5 agg.)	(Netherlands) Ajax	Olympic Stadium, Athens
18:30 CET	Kapouranis 58'	Report	Wouters 90'	Attendance: 21,000; Referee: Ioan Igna (Romania)

==== Quarter-finals ====
14 March 1987 First leg	Malmö (Sweden)	1–0	(Netherlands) Ajax	Malmö Stadion, Malmö
19:00 CET	Persson 43' (pen.)	Report		Attendance: 20,186; Referee: George Smith (Scotland)

18 March 1987 Second leg	Ajax (Netherlands)	3–1 (3–2 agg.)	(Sweden) Malmö	De Meer Stadion, Amsterdam
20:15 CET	van Basten 23', 72'; Winter 61'	Report	Lindman 81'	Attendance: 24,775; Referee: Dieter Pauly (West Germany)

==== Semi-finals ====
8 April 1987 First leg	Real Zaragoza (Spain)	2–3	(Netherlands) Ajax	La Romareda, Zaragoza
20:00 CEST	Sosa 13'; Señor 71' (pen.)	Report	Witschge 16'; Bosman 47', 55'	Attendance: 35,000; Referee: Zoran Petrović (Yugoslavia)

22 April 1987 Second leg	Ajax (Netherlands)	3–0 (6–2 agg.)	(Spain) Real Zaragoza	Olympic Stadium, Amsterdam
20:15 CEST	van 't Schip 17'; Witschge 72'; Rijkaard 90'	Report		Attendance: 47,916; Referee: Franz Wöhrer (Austria)

==== Final ====
13 May 1987 Final	Ajax (Netherlands)	1–0	(East Germany) 1. FC Lokomotive Leipzig	Olympic Stadium, Athens
20:15 CEST	van Basten 20'	Report		Attendance: 35,000; Referee: Luigi Agnolin (Italy)

== Statistics ==
=== Appearances and goals ===
As of 8 June 1987

No.	Pos	Nat	Player	Total		Eredivisie		KNVB Cup		Cup Winners' Cup	
No.	Pos	Nat	Player	Apps	Goals	Apps	Goals	Apps	Goals	Apps	Goals
1	GK	(Netherlands) NED	Menzo	50	0	34	0	7	0	9	0
2	DF	(Netherlands) NED	Blind	41	4	28+1	4	5	0	7	0
3	DF	(Netherlands) NED	Verlaat	5	1	2+1	0	1	1	1	0
4	DF	(Netherlands) NED	Rijkaard	50	9	34	7	7	0	9	2
5	DF	(Netherlands) NED	Boeve	34	2	12+10	2	2+3	0	3+4	0
6	MF	(Netherlands) NED	Winter	42	10	18+10	8	4+1	1	5+4	1
7	FW	(Netherlands) NED	van 't Schip	49	2	33	1	7	0	9	1
8	MF	(Netherlands) NED	Wouters	48	5	32	4	7	0	9	1
9	FW	(Netherlands) NED	van Basten	43	44	26+1	31	7	7	9	6
10	MF	(Netherlands) NED	Mühren	37	4	24	3	5	0	8	1
11	FW	(Netherlands) NED	Witschge	38	5	23+6	3	3	0	6	2
12	DF	(Netherlands) NED	Silooy	50	0	31+3	0	7	0	9	0
13	DF	(Netherlands) NED	Spelbos	32	2	22	2	4	0	6	0
14	MF	(Finland) FIN	Tiainen	5	0	2+3	0	0	0	0	0
15	FW	(Netherlands) NED	Bergkamp	23	2	7+7	2	1+4	0	1+3	0
16	MF	(Netherlands) NED	Scholten	23	1	11+7	1	0+2	0	1+2	0
—	MF	(Netherlands) NED	Witschge	6	0	0+2	0	3+1	0	0	0
—	FW	(Netherlands) NED	Bosman	47	36	27+6	23	6+1	5	6+1	8
—	MF	(Scotland) SCO	Dick	10	2	3+4	1	1	1	1+1	0
—	DF	(Netherlands) NED	Gemert	2	0	2	0	0	0	0	0
—	DF	(Netherlands) NED	Ophof	3	0	3	0	0	0	0	0
—	MF	(Australia) AUS	Petersen	1	0	0+1	0	0	0	0	0
—	DF	(Netherlands) NED	Smak	1	0	0+1	0	0	0	0	0
—	MF	(Netherlands) NED	Sneekes	1	0	0+1	0	0	0	0	0
