= Club van 100 (AFC Ajax) =

The official Club van 100 of Ajax Amsterdam

Club van 100 (English: Club of 100) is an unofficial club of football players who have appeared in one hundred or more official matches for AFC Ajax.

== Club van 100 ==
AFC Ajax has an unofficial Club of 100, consisting of players who have played one hundred or more official matches in the first team. The club currently has a total of 185 members with Josip Šutalo and Mika Godts being the latest additions. The record for official appearances is held by Sjaak Swart, who appeared in 603 matches for Ajax 1; Swart is hence dubbed Mister Ajax.

== Members list ==
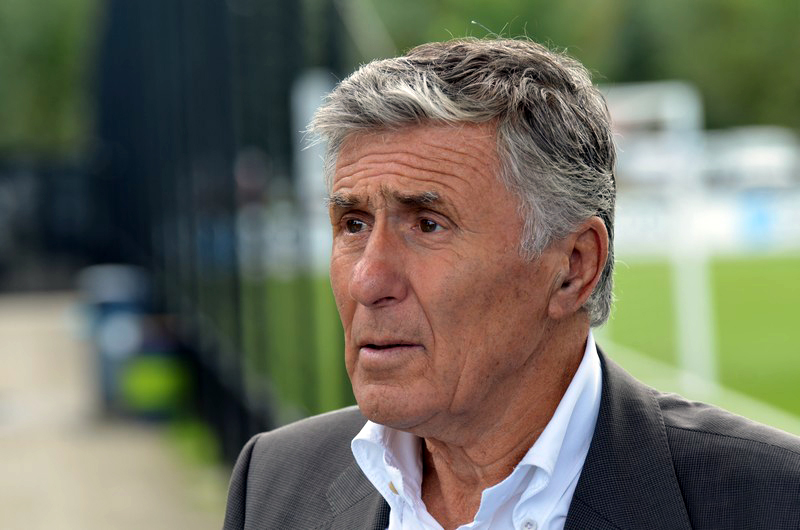
Sjaak Swart made the most official match appearances for Ajax

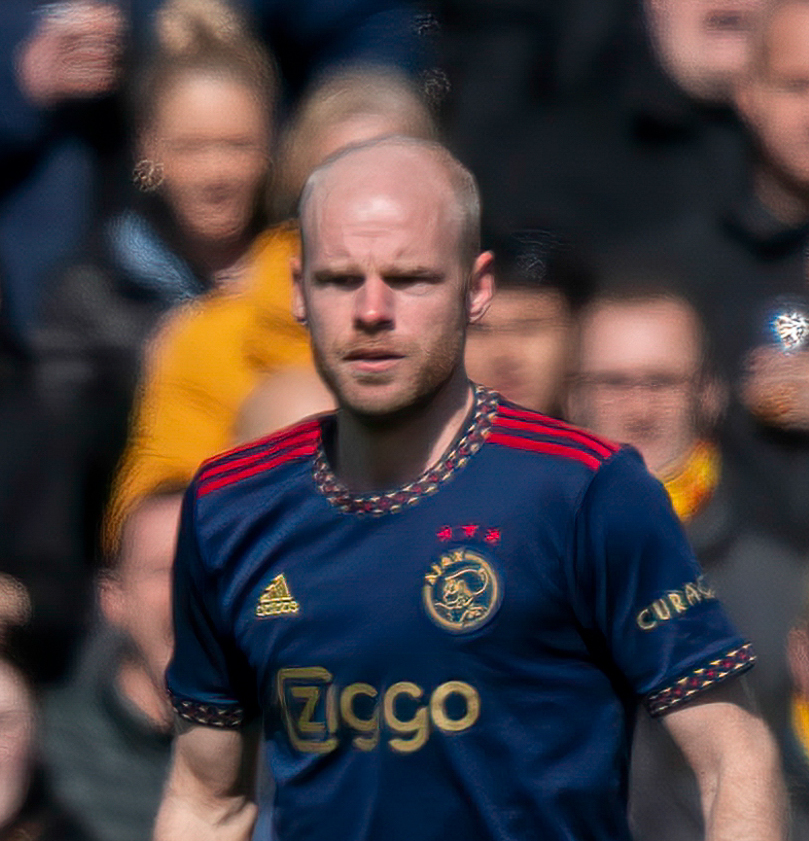
Davy Klaassen is the current active member with the most appearances

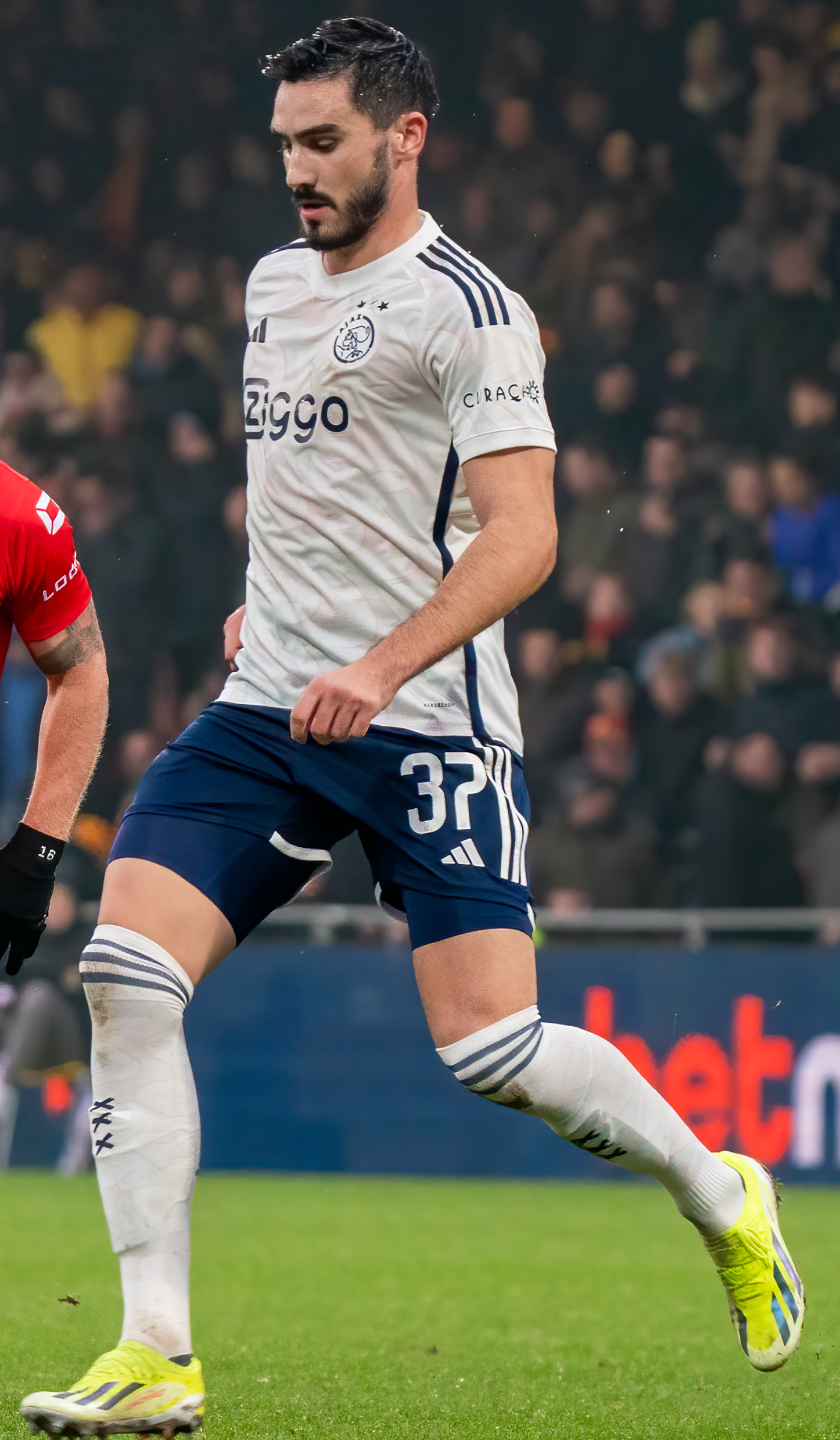
Josip Šutalo one of the two most recent players to join the Club of 100

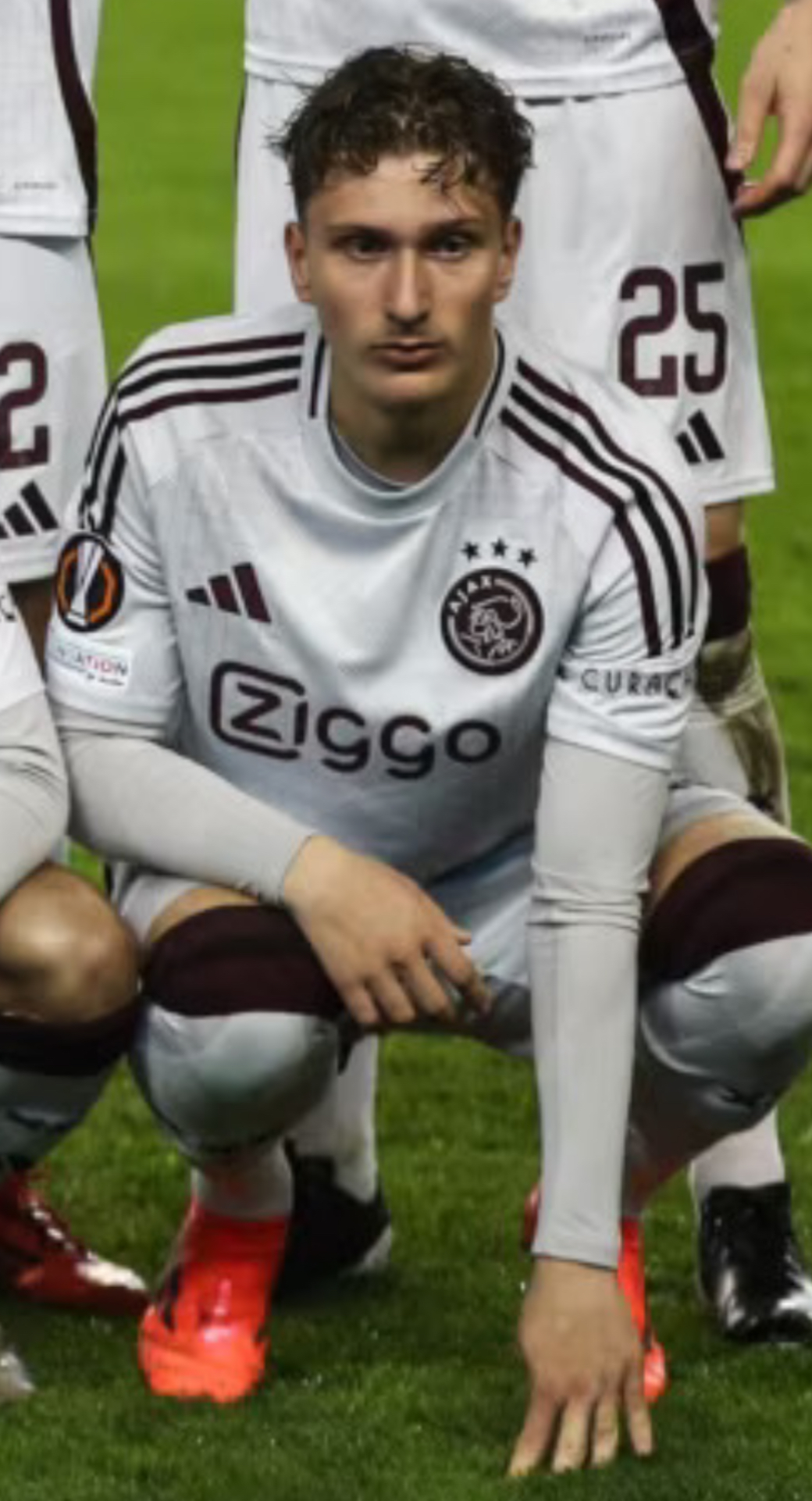
Mika Godts one of the two most recent players to join the Club of 100

Still active players are highlighted

The table below is a list of the Club van 100 members, sorted by total appearances.

| No. | Player | Nationality | Total | From | Till |
|---|---|---|---|---|---|
| 1 | Sjaak Swart | Netherlands | 603 | 1956 | 1973 |
| 2 | Wim Suurbier | Netherlands | 509 | 1964 | 1977 |
| 3 | Danny Blind | Netherlands | 493 | 1986 | 1999 |
| 4 | Piet Keizer | Netherlands | 489 | 1961 | 1974 |
| 5 | Ruud Krol | Netherlands | 457 | 1968 | 1980 |
| 6 | Frank de Boer | Netherlands | 434 | 1988 | 1999 |
| 7 | Bennie Muller | Netherlands | 425 | 1958 | 1970 |
| 8 | Davy Klaassen | Netherlands | 393 | 2011 | present |
| 9 | Barry Hulshoff | Netherlands | 386 | 1966 | 1977 |
| 10 | Johan Cruijff | Netherlands | 369 | 1964 | 1983 |
| 11 | Piet Schrijvers | Netherlands | 356 | 1974 | 1983 |
| 12 | Dick Schoenaker | Netherlands | 348 | 1976 | 1985 |
| 13 | John van 't Schip | Netherlands | 347 | 1981 | 1992 |
| 14 | Sonny Silooy | Netherlands | 343 | 1981 | 1996 |
| 15 | Ger van Mourik | Netherlands | 342 | 1950 | 1963 |
| 16 | Frank Rijkaard | Netherlands | 337 | 1980 | 1995 |
| 17 | Ton Pronk | Netherlands | 335 | 1960 | 1970 |
| 18 | Daley Blind | Netherlands | 333 | 2009 | 2023 |
| 19 | Gé van Dijk | Netherlands | 325 | 1943 | 1957 |
| 20 | Stanley Menzo | Netherlands | 321 | 1984 | 1994 |
| 21 | Edwin van der Sar | Netherlands | 313 | 1991 | 1999 |
| 22 | Maarten Stekelenburg | Netherlands | 311 | 2002 | 2023 |
| 23 | Gerrit Keizer | Netherlands | 310 | 1929 | 1948 |
| 24 | Wim Anderiesen, Sr. | Netherlands | 309 | 1925 | 1940 |
| 25 | Ronald de Boer | Netherlands | 306 | 1987 | 1999 |
| 26 | Henk Groot | Netherlands | 302 | 1959 | 1969 |
| 27 | Aron Winter | Netherlands | 302 | 1986 | 2003 |
| 28 | Gerrie Mühren | Netherlands | 300 | 1968 | 1976 |
| 29 | Peter Boeve | Netherlands | 296 | 1979 | 1987 |
| 30 | Lasse Schöne | Denmark | 287 | 2012 | 2019 |
| 31 | Richard Witschge | Netherlands | 286 | 1986 | 2003 |
| 32 | Siem de Jong | Netherlands | 277 | 2007 | 2020 |
| 33 | Søren Lerby | Denmark | 269 | 1976 | 1983 |
| 34 | Wim Volkers | Netherlands | 266 | 1923 | 1936 |
| 35 | Piet Ouderland | Netherlands | 261 | 1955 | 1964 |
| 36 | Rinus Michels | Netherlands | 258 | 1946 | 1958 |
| 37 | Klaas-Jan Huntelaar | Netherlands | 257 | 2005 | 2021 |
| 38 | Jari Litmanen | Finland | 255 | 1992 | 2004 |
| 39 | Urby Emanuelson | Netherlands | 255 | 2005 | 2010 |
| 40 | Jan Potharst | Netherlands | 247 | 1939 | 1952 |
| 41 | Joël Veltman | Netherlands | 246 | 2012 | 2020 |
| 42 | Gerrit Fischer | Netherlands | 245 | 1934 | 1950 |
| 43 | Piet van Reenen | Netherlands | 242 | 1929 | 1942 |
| 44 | Dušan Tadić | Serbia | 241 | 2018 | 2023 |
| 45 | Dennis Bergkamp | Netherlands | 237 | 1986 | 1993 |
| 46 | Joop Pelser | Netherlands | 235 | 1911 | 1924 |
| 47 | Henk Hordijk | Netherlands | 233 | 1917 | 1927 |
| 48 | Fons Pelser | Netherlands | 228 | 1911 | 1926 |
| 49 | Tscheu La Ling | Netherlands | 222 | 1975 | 1982 |
| 50 | Theo Brokmann | Netherlands | 221 | 1913 | 1924 |
| 51 | Jan Vertonghen | Belgium | 220 | 2006 | 2012 |
| 52 | Arnold Mühren | Netherlands | 218 | 1971 | 1989 |
| 53 | John Heitinga | Netherlands | 218 | 2001 | 2015 |
| 54 | Gert Bals | Netherlands | 216 | 1965 | 1970 |
| 55 | André Onana | Cameroon | 214 | 2016 | 2022 |
| 56 | Frank Arnesen | Denmark | 213 | 1976 | 1981 |
| 57 | Bertus Hoogerman | Netherlands | 212 | 1956 | 1965 |
| 58 | Jan van Diepenbeek | Netherlands | 211 | 1929 | 1938 |
| 59 | Gerald Vanenburg | Netherlands | 209 | 1981 | 1986 |
| 60 | Guus Dräger | Netherlands | 207 | 1941 | 1951 |
| 61 | Jan Schubert | Netherlands | 206 | 1931 | 1943 |
| 62 | Velibor Vasović | Serbia | 204 | 1966 | 1971 |
| 63 | Tomáš Galásek | Czech Republic | 202 | 2000 | 2006 |
| 64 | Frans Couton | Netherlands | 200 | 1917 | 1927 |
| 65 | Joop Stoffelen | Netherlands | 200 | 1940 | 1950 |
| 66 | Stefan Pettersson | Sweden | 197 | 1988 | 1994 |
| 67 | Jan de Boer | Netherlands | 196 | 1920 | 1933 |
| 68 | Henk Blomvliet | Netherlands | 195 | 1932 | 1947 |
| 69 | Jan Wouters | Netherlands | 194 | 1986 | 1991 |
| 70 | Heinz Stuy | Netherlands | 193 | 1968 | 1976 |
| 71 | Edo Ophof | Netherlands | 193 | 1980 | 1988 |
| 72 | Gregory van der Wiel | Netherlands | 191 | 2007 | 2012 |
| 73 | Werner Schaaphok | Germany | 191 | 1959 | 1965 |
| 74 | Marc Overmars | Netherlands | 191 | 1992 | 1997 |
| 75 | Horst Blankenburg | Germany | 188 | 1970 | 1975 |
| 76 | Klaas Nuninga | Netherlands | 186 | 1964 | 1969 |
| 77 | Toby Alderweireld | Belgium | 186 | 2008 | 2013 |
| 78 | Co Prins | Netherlands | 184 | 1959 | 1966 |
| 79 | Edgar Davids | Netherlands | 183 | 1991 | 2008 |
| 80 | Kenneth Taylor | Netherlands | 185 | 2019 | 2025 |
| 81 | Arie Haan | Netherlands | 180 | 1968 | 1975 |
| 82 | Wesley Sneijder | Netherlands | 180 | 2003 | 2007 |
| 83 | David Neres | Brazil | 180 | 2017 | 2022 |
| 84 | Dolf van Kol | Netherlands | 177 | 1924 | 1930 |
| 85 | Jan de Natris | Netherlands | 175 | 1917 | 1929 |
| 86 | Donny van de Beek | Netherlands | 175 | 2015 | 2020 |
| 87 | Steven Berghuis | Netherlands | 174 | 2021 | present |
| 88 | Pim van Dord | Netherlands | 173 | 1973 | 1980 |
| 89 | Klaas Bakker | Netherlands | 172 | 1951 | 1957 |
| 90 | Marco van Basten | Netherlands | 172 | 1982 | 1986 |
| 91 | Johan Neeskens | Netherlands | 171 | 1970 | 1974 |
| 92 | Theo van Duivenbode | Netherlands | 170 | 1964 | 1969 |
| 93 | Nicolás Tagliafico | Argentina | 169 | 2018 | 2022 |
| 94 | Joop Martens | Netherlands | 167 | 1920 | 1932 |
| 95 | Wim Anderiesen Jr. | Netherlands | 166 | 1951 | 1961 |
| 96 | Ruud Geels | Netherlands | 166 | 1974 | 1978 |
| 97 | Hakim Ziyech | Morocco | 165 | 2016 | 2020 |
| 98 | John Bosman | Netherlands | 164 | 1983 | 1988 |
| 99 | Ricardo van Rhijn | Netherlands | 163 | 2008 | 2016 |
| 100 | Brian Brobbey | Netherlands | 163 | 2018 | 2025 |
| 101 | Christian Eriksen | Denmark | 162 | 2010 | 2013 |
| 102 | Erwin van Wijngaarden | Netherlands | 159 | 1932 | 1949 |
| 103 | Luis Suárez | Uruguay | 159 | 2007 | 2010 |
| 104 | Miralem Sulejmani | Serbia | 158 | 2008 | 2013 |
| 105 | Wamberto | Brazil | 156 | 1998 | 2003 |
| 106 | Maxwell | Brazil | 156 | 2001 | 2005 |
| 107 | Rafael van der Vaart | Netherlands | 156 | 2000 | 2005 |
| 108 | Eddy Pieters Graafland | Netherlands | 155 | 1953 | 1958 |
| 109 | Bryan Roy | Netherlands | 155 | 1987 | 1993 |
| 110 | Devyne Rensch | Netherlands | 155 | 2020 | 2025 |
| 111 | Piet van Deijck | Netherlands | 154 | 1927 | 1937 |
| 112 | Arnold Scholten | Netherlands | 153 | 1986 | 1997 |
| 113 | Cees Groot | Netherlands | 152 | 1959 | 1964 |
| 114 | Vurnon Anita | Curaçao | 152 | 2006 | 2012 |
| 115 | Jan van Dort | Netherlands | 150 | 1913 | 1922 |
| 116 | Ko Loois | Netherlands | 150 | 1933 | 1947 |
| 117 | Bob ten Have | Netherlands | 149 | 1923 | 1938 |
| 118 | Simon Tahamata | Netherlands | 149 | 1976 | 1980 |
| 119 | Eyong Enoh | Cameroon | 149 | 2008 | 2014 |
| 120 | Edson Álvarez | Mexico | 147 | 2019 | 2023 |
| 121 | Hatem Trabelsi | Tunisia | 145 | 2001 | 2006 |
| 122 | Thomas Vermaelen | Belgium | 143 | 2005 | 2009 |
| 123 | Jasper Cillessen | Netherlands | 143 | 2011 | 2016 |
| 124 | Cristian Chivu | Romania | 142 | 1999 | 2003 |
| 125 | Ryan Babel | Netherlands | 142 | 2003 | 2020 |
| 126 | Marciano Vink | Netherlands | 140 | 1988 | 1993 |
| 127 | Henk Mulders | Netherlands | 139 | 1929 | 1936 |
| 128 | Kenneth Vermeer | Netherlands | 139 | 2006 | 2014 |
| 129 | Noussair Mazraoui | Morocco | 137 | 2018 | 2022 |
| 130 | Jany van der Veen | Netherlands | 135 | 1939 | 1948 |
| 131 | Henk Anderiesen | Netherlands | 133 | 1925 | 1932 |
| 132 | Steven Pienaar | South Africa | 133 | 2001 | 2006 |
| 133 | Nigel de Jong | Netherlands | 133 | 2002 | 2006 |
| 134 | Theo Brokmann Jr. | Netherlands | 131 | 1939 | 1951 |
| 135 | Piet van der Kuil | Netherlands | 131 | 1955 | 1959 |
| 136 | Wim Gupffert | Netherlands | 130 | 1915 | 1921 |
| 137 | Cor Geelhuijzen | Netherlands | 130 | 1954 | 1960 |
| 138 | Piet Strijbosch | Netherlands | 128 | 1928 | 1935 |
| 139 | Eddy Hamel | United States | 126 | 1922 | 1930 |
| 140 | Ronald Spelbos | Netherlands | 126 | 1984 | 1988 |
| 141 | Wim Jonk | Netherlands | 126 | 1988 | 1993 |
| 142 | Shota Arveladze | Georgia | 125 | 1997 | 2001 |
| 143 | Fred Grim | Netherlands | 125 | 1995 | 2002 |
| 144 | Johnny Rep | Netherlands | 124 | 1971 | 1975 |
| 145 | Rob Witschge | Netherlands | 122 | 1985 | 1989 |
| 146 | Finidi George | Nigeria | 122 | 1993 | 1996 |
| 147 | Andy van der Meijde | Netherlands | 122 | 2000 | 2003 |
| 148 | Thulani Serero | South Africa | 121 | 2011 | 2017 |
| 149 | Jurriën Timber | Netherlands | 120 | 2020 | 2023 |
| 150 | Nick Viergever | Netherlands | 119 | 2014 | 2018 |
| 151 | Kasper Dolberg | Denmark | 119 | 2016 | 2019 |
| 152 | Lisandro Martínez | Argentina | 120 | 2019 | 2022 |
| 153 | Peet Petersen | Netherlands | 118 | 1960 | 1965 |
| 154 | Gabri | Spain | 118 | 2006 | 2010 |
| 155 | Frits Terwee | Netherlands | 117 | 1911 | 1919 |
| 156 | Dick van Dijk | Netherlands | 117 | 1969 | 1972 |
| 157 | Wim Kieft | Netherlands | 117 | 1979 | 1983 |
| 158 | Matthijs de Ligt | Netherlands | 117 | 2016 | 2019 |
| 159 | Johnny Dusbaba | Netherlands | 116 | 1974 | 1977 |
| 160 | Ronald Koeman | Netherlands | 114 | 1983 | 1986 |
| 161 | Michel Kreek | Netherlands | 114 | 1989 | 1994 |
| 162 | Viktor Fischer | Denmark | 111 | 2012 | 2016 |
| 163 | Jorrel Hato | Netherlands | 111 | 2022 | 2025 |
| 164 | Zlatan Ibrahimović | Sweden | 110 | 2001 | 2004 |
| 165 | Zdeněk Grygera | Czech Republic | 110 | 2003 | 2007 |
| 166 | Loek den Edel | Netherlands | 109 | 1954 | 1958 |
| 167 | Hans Erkens | Netherlands | 107 | 1976 | 1979 |
| 168 | Hedwiges Maduro | Netherlands | 107 | 2004 | 2008 |
| 169 | Guus van Ham | Netherlands | 106 | 1957 | 1962 |
| 170 | Kolbeinn Sigþórsson | Iceland | 106 | 2011 | 2015 |
| 171 | Niklas Moisander | Finland | 105 | 2012 | 2015 |
| 172 | Henk Elzer | Netherlands | 104 | 1951 | 1957 |
| 173 | Anton Gaaei | Denmark | 104 | 2023 | present |
| 174 | Josip Šutalo | Croatia | 104 | 2023 | present |
| 175 | Mika Godts | Belgium | 104 | 2023 | present |
| 176 | Jesper Olsen | Denmark | 103 | 1981 | 1984 |
| 177 | Ryan Gravenberch | Netherlands | 103 | 2018 | 2022 |
| 178 | Tijani Babangida | Nigeria | 102 | 1996 | 2000 |
| 179 | Gerrit Krist | Netherlands | 100 | 1947 | 1954 |
| 180 | Henk Twelker | Netherlands | 100 | 1925 | 1932 |
| 181 | Patrick Kluivert | Netherlands | 100 | 1994 | 1997 |
| 182 | Nourdin Boukhari | Morocco | 100 | 2002 | 2006 |
| 183 | Anwar El Ghazi | Netherlands | 100 | 2014 | 2017 |
| 184 | Amin Younes | Germany | 100 | 2015 | 2018 |
| 185 | Remko Pasveer | Netherlands | 100 | 2021 | 2026 |

This list is accurate as of last match played on April 4, 2026, AFC Ajax - FC Twente.

== Nationalities ==
Nationalities in the club van 100
| Netherlands | 137 |
| Denmark | 8 |
| Belgium | 4 |
| Brazil | 3 |
| Germany | 3 |
| Morocco | 3 |
| Serbia | 3 |
| Argentina | 2 |
| Cameroon | 2 |
| Czech Republic | 2 |
| Finland | 2 |
| Nigeria | 2 |
| South Africa | 2 |
| Sweden | 2 |
| Croatia | 1 |
| Curaçao | 1 |
| Georgia | 1 |
| Iceland | 1 |
| Mexico | 1 |
| Romania | 1 |
| Spain | 1 |
| Tunisia | 1 |
| United States | 1 |
| Uruguay | 1 |

== Total caps of current squad ==
| No. | Player | Nationality | Total |
|---|---|---|---|
| 130 | Devyne Rensch | Netherlands | 130 |
| 146 | Brian Brobbey | Netherlands | 119 |
| 154 | Steven Berghuis | Netherlands | 117 |
| 159 | Kenneth Taylor | Netherlands | 113 |
| - | Steven Bergwijn | Netherlands | 76 |
| - | Jorrel Hato | Netherlands | 61 |
| - | Remko Pasveer | Netherlands | 50 |
| - | Benjamin Tahirović | Bosnia and Herzegovina | 37 |
| - | Kristian Hlynsson | Iceland | 36 |
| - | Chuba Akpom | England | 35 |
| - | Anton Gaaei | Denmark | 33 |
| - | Carlos Forbs | Portugal | 32 |
| - | Gerónimo Rulli | Argentina | 32 |
| - | Josip Šutalo | Croatia | 32 |
| - | Diant Ramaj | Germany | 31 |
| - | Branco van den Boomen | Netherlands | 29 |
| - | Borna Sosa | Croatia | 24 |
| - | Mika Godts | Belgium | 20 |
| - | Sivert Mannsverk | Norway | 16 |
| - | Silvano Vos | Netherlands | 16 |
| - | Jay Gorter | Netherlands | 15 |
| - | Tristan Gooijer | Netherlands | 13 |
| - | Ahmetcan Kaplan | Turkey | 13 |
| - | Jordan Henderson | England | 12 |
| - | Ar'jany Martha | Curaçao | 12 |
| - | Julian Rijkhoff | Netherlands | 10 |
| - | Jakov Medić | Croatia | 9 |
| - | Gastón Ávila | Argentina | 8 |
| - | Amourricho van Axel Dongen | Netherlands | 8 |
| - | Jaydon Banel | Netherlands | 6 |
| - | Kian Fitz-Jim | Netherlands | 6 |
| - | Olivier Aertssen | Netherlands | 1 |
| - | Charlie Setford | England | 0 |

This list is accurate as of last match played on 19 May 2024, SBV Vitesse - AFC Ajax.

== See also ==
- List of AFC Ajax players
- List of AFC Ajax records and statistics
