= Piet Ouderland =

Dutch footballer and basketball player

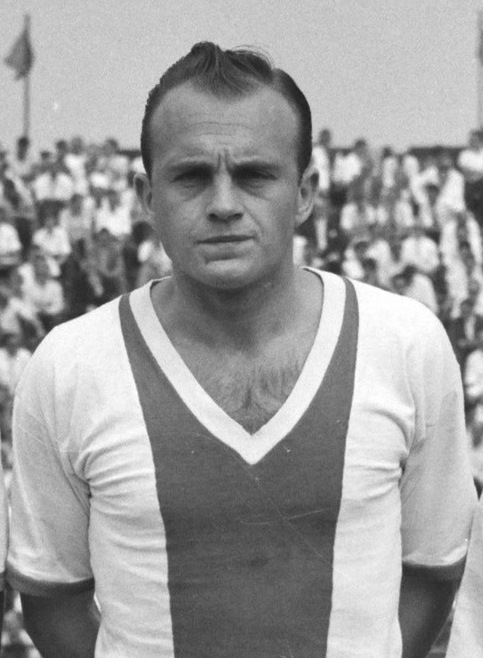
- Ouderland in August 1959

Personal information
- Full name: Pieter Ouderland
- Date of birth: 17 March 1933
- Place of birth: Amsterdam, Netherlands
- Date of death: 3 September 2017 (aged 84)
- Place of death: Amsterdam, Netherlands
- Positions: Forward; defender

Senior career*
Years	Team	Apps	(Gls)
1950–1955	OVVO Amsterdam	?	(?)
1955–1964	Ajax	220	(20)
1964–1967	FC Zaanstreek	?	(?)
1967–1968	AZ '67	30	(5)
1968–1969	ZFC	?	(?)

International career
1962–1963	Netherlands	7	(0)

Managerial career
- 1969–1971: AZ '67 (assistant)
- 1971–1976: AFC
- * Club domestic league appearances and goals

Piet Ouderland (17 March 1933 – 3 September 2017) was a Dutch footballer and basketball player. As a footballer, he played as a striker for Ajax, AZ Alkmaar and the Netherlands national team. For Ajax, he made 261 total appearances with the club between 1955 and 1964, becoming a member of Club van 100. He also made seven appearances with the national team in 1962 and 1963. As a basketball player, he also played for the national team, making him the first Dutchman to play for the national sides of football and basketball.
