= Jan Wouters =

Dutch footballer and manager (born 1960)

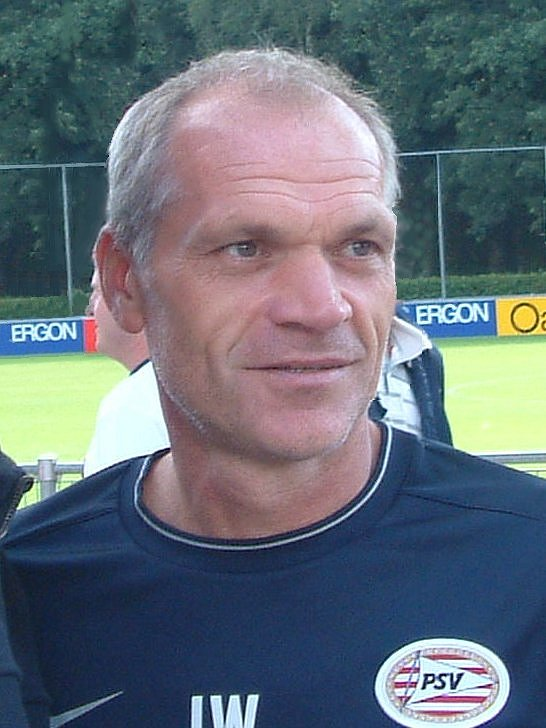

Personal information
- Full name: Jan Jacobus Wouters
- Date of birth: 17 July 1960 (age 66)
- Place of birth: Utrecht, Netherlands
- Height: 1.75 m (5 ft 9 in)
- Position: Defensive midfielder

Senior career*
Years	Team	Apps	(Gls)
1980–1986	Utrecht	166	(21)
1986–1991	Ajax	151	(22)
1991–1993	Bayern Munich	66	(6)
1993–1996	PSV	52	(5)
Total		435	(54)

International career
1982–1994	Netherlands	70	(4)

Managerial career
- 1996–1997: Utrecht (assistant)
- 1997: Utrecht (caretaker)
- 1997–1998: Ajax (youth)
- 1998–2000: Ajax
- 2001–2006: Rangers (assistant)
- 2006–2007: PSV (assistant)
- 2007: PSV (caretaker)
- 2008–2009: PSV (assistant)
- 2009–2011: Utrecht (assistant)
- 2011–2014: Utrecht
- 2015: Kasımpaşa (caretaker)
- 2015–2018: Feyenoord (assistant)
- 2021: Fortuna Sittard (assistant)
- 2022-present: Ajax youth (assistant)
Medal record
Representing Netherlands
UEFA European Championship
Winner	1988 West Germany
Bronze medal – third place	1992 Sweden
- * Club domestic league appearances and goals

Jan Jacobus Wouters (Dutch pronunciation: [jɑn jaːkoːbʏs ˈʋʌutərs]; born 17 July 1960) is a Dutch professional football coach and former player. He played as a defensive midfielder and was Dutch Footballer of the Year in 1990.

== Playing career ==
Wouters played for Utrecht, Ajax, Bayern Munich and PSV.

He made his professional debut in the Eredivisie for Utrecht in October 1980. With Utrecht, he won the KNVB Cup in 1985, the first ever for the club. He was transferred to Ajax in the summer of 1986, led by manager Johan Cruyff at the time. His transfer was initially mocked by teammate Marco van Basten, but Wouters quickly found his way in the team. Eventually he won one Eredivisie title, one KNVB Cup, and one Cup Winners' Cup during his five years playing in Amsterdam. In November 1991, Wouters left Ajax for Bayern Munich. He switched to PSV in December 1993 and played his last professional match in May 1996, whilst also winning the third KNVB Cup of his career that season.

== International career ==
Wouters was a Netherlands international team member (70 caps, four goals) and was hugely influential in 1988 when the Netherlands won the European Football Championship.

Wouters participated in four tournaments as player of the Dutch national team: UEFA Euro 1988, 1990 FIFA World Cup, UEFA Euro 1992, and 1994 FIFA World Cup. He played his final match in the Dutch team during the quarter finals of the 1994 World Cup against later winners Brazil on 9 July 1994.

== Managerial career ==
After he ended his career as a player, Wouters' first job was being assistent manager to Ronald Spelbos at Utrecht in 1996. After one season at Utrecht, Wouters moved to Ajax to become the manager of the second team and landed his first job as head coach after the sacking of coach Morten Olsen in December 1998. Wouters himself was sacked by Ajax in March 2000.

He was a coach of Scottish Premier League club Rangers under Dick Advocaat and then Alex McLeish, starting in July 2001. He left Rangers at the end of the 2005–06 season, along with McLeish and Andy Watson.

== Clash with Paul Gascoigne ==
Wouters is infamous to England supporters after elbowing Paul Gascoigne and fracturing his cheekbone during a World Cup qualifier in 1993 at Wembley Stadium. Gascoigne was forced to wear a "Phantom of the Opera"-style facemask to protect his fractured cheekbone until his injury healed. The following day, the Daily Mirror labelled Wouters a "Dutch thug". The match was drawn 2–2 and damaged England's hopes of qualifying for the 1994 World Cup finals in the United States, despite England leading the match 2–0.

== In popular culture ==
Wouters was repeatedly referenced in a Saturday Night Live sketch on 4 February 2023 featuring James Austin Johnson and Devon Walker as British rappers Milly Pounds and Shirty.

== Career statistics ==
=== Club ===
Appearances and goals by club, season and competition
Club	Season	League			National Cup		Other		Continental		Total	
Club	Season	Division	Apps	Goals	Apps	Goals	Apps	Goals	Apps	Goals	Apps	Goals
Utrecht	1980–81	Eredivisie	19	1	2	0	—		—		21	1
Utrecht	1981–82	Eredivisie	31	4	8	2	—		2 (Note: Appearances in UEFA Cup)	0	41	6
Utrecht	1982–83	Eredivisie	27	6	1	0	—		1	0	29	6
Utrecht	1983–84	Eredivisie	31	4	2	1	—		—		33	5
Utrecht	1984–85	Eredivisie	25	1	6	1	—		—		31	2
Utrecht	1985–86	Eredivisie	33	5	1	0	—		2 (Note: Appearances in UEFA Cup Winners' Cup)	0	36	5
Utrecht	Total		166	21	20	4	—		5	0	191	25
Ajax	1986–87	Eredivisie	32	4	7	0	—		9	1	48	5
Ajax	1987–88	Eredivisie	28	4	1	0	2 (Note: Appearances in UEFA Super Cup)	0	7	0	38	4
Ajax	1988–89	Eredivisie	22	0	4	0	—		1	0	27	0
Ajax	1989–90	Eredivisie	28	7	4	1	—		2	1	34	9
Ajax	1990–91	Eredivisie	30	5	2	1	—		— (Note: Ajax suspended for playing European football as a result of the iron rod incident in the previous season)		32	6
Ajax	1991–92	Eredivisie	11	2	—		—		4	0	15	2
Ajax	Total		151	22	18	2	2	0	23	2	194	26
Bayern Munich	1991–92	Bundesliga	17	1	—		—		—		17	1
Bayern Munich	1992–93	Bundesliga	33	4	2	0	—		—		35	4
Bayern Munich	1993–94	Bundesliga	16	1	4	1	—		4	0	24	2
Bayern Munich	Total		66	6	6	1	—		4	0	76	7
PSV	1993–94	Eredivisie	10	1	1	0	—		—		11	1
PSV	1994–95	Eredivisie	22	1	1	0	—		2	0	25	1
PSV	1995–96	Eredivisie	20	3	4	0	—		3	0	27	3
PSV	Total		52	5	6	0	—		5	0	63	5
Career total			435	54	50	7	2	0	37	2	524	63

=== International ===
Appearances and goals by national team and year
National team	Year	Apps	Goals
Netherlands	1982	1	0
Netherlands	1983	0	0
Netherlands	1984	0	0
Netherlands	1985	0	0
Netherlands	1986	7	0
Netherlands	1987	3	0
Netherlands	1988	10	1
Netherlands	1989	5	2
Netherlands	1990	11	0
Netherlands	1991	6	0
Netherlands	1992	13	1
Netherlands	1993	7	0
Netherlands	1994	7	0
Total		70	4

Scores and results list the Netherlands' goal tally first, score column indicates score after each Wouters goal.

List of international goals scored by Jan Wouters
No.	Date	Venue	Opponent	Score	Result	Competition
1	24 May 1988	De Kuip, Rotterdam, Netherlands	Bulgaria	1–0	1–2	Friendly
2	4 January 1989	Ramat Gan Stadium, Tel Aviv, Israel	Israel	1–0	2–0	Friendly
3	6 September 1989	Olympisch Stadion, Amsterdam, Netherlands	Denmark	2–0	2–2	Friendly
4	25 March 1992	De Meer Stadion, Amsterdam, Netherlands	Yugoslavia	2–0	2–0	Friendly

== Honours ==
Utrecht

- KNVB Cup: 1984–85

Ajax

- Eredivisie: 1989–90
- KNVB Cup: 1986–87
- UEFA Cup Winners' Cup: 1986–87, runner-up 1987–88

PSV

- KNVB Cup: 1995–96

Netherlands

- UEFA European Championship: 1988

Individual

- Dutch Footballer of the Year: 1989–90
- UEFA European Championship Team of the Tournament: 1988
- kicker Bundesliga Team of the Season: 1992–93

== See also ==
- Big Three (Netherlands)
