= Wim Anderiesen Jr. =

Dutch association football player

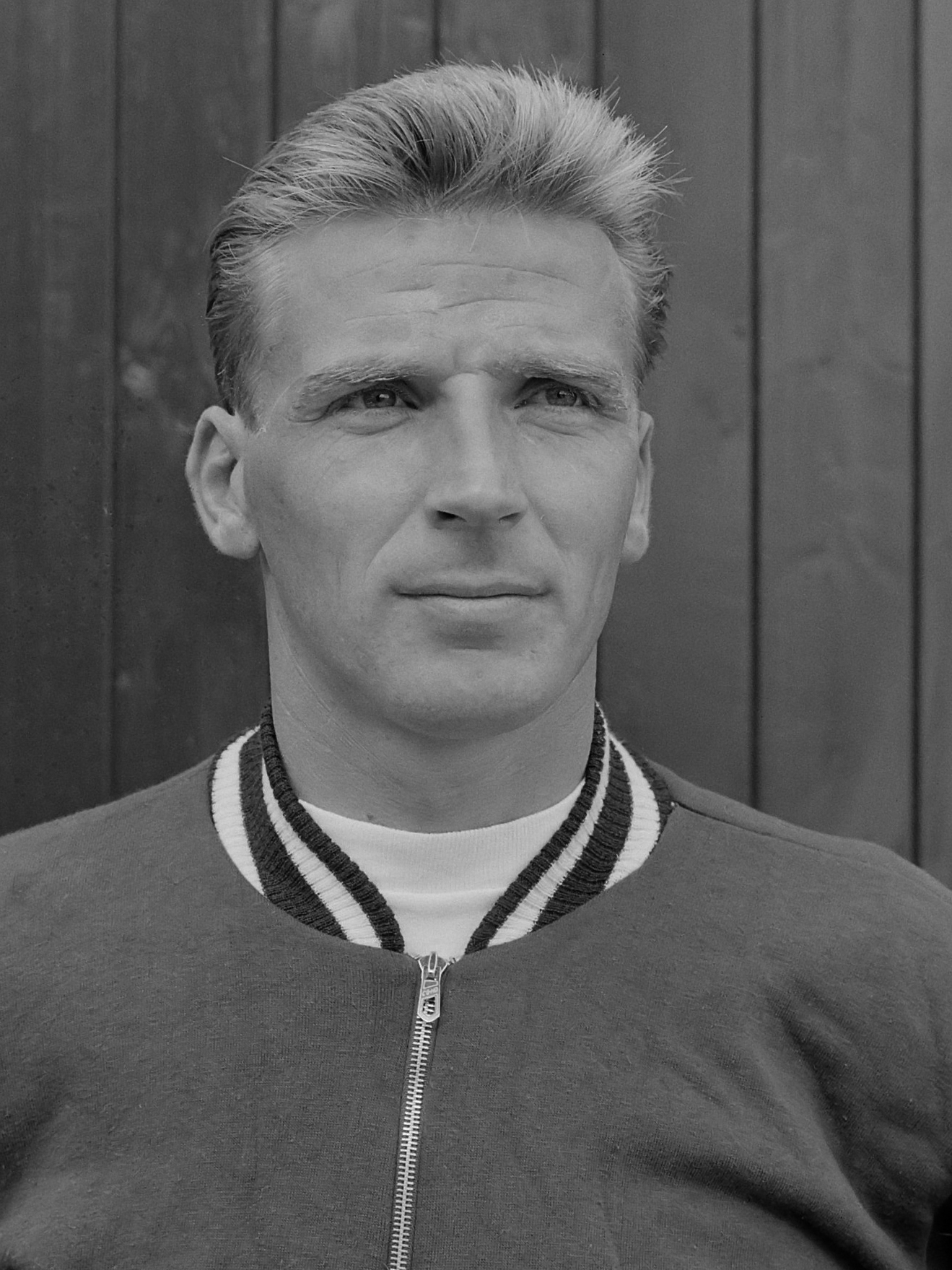
- Anderiesen in August 1964

Personal information
- Full name: Gerardus Willem Anderiesen Jr.
- Date of birth: 2 September 1931
- Place of birth: Amsterdam, Netherlands
- Date of death: 27 January 2017 (aged 85)
- Place of death: Heerhugowaard, Netherlands
- Position: Defender

Senior career*
Years	Team	Apps	(Gls)
1951–1961	Ajax	177	(1)
1961–1965	SHS Holland Sport	119	(4)
Total		296	(5)
- * Club domestic league appearances and goals

Gerardus Willem "Wim" Anderiesen Jr. (2 September 1931 – 27 January 2017) was a Dutch footballer. He played as a defender at club level from the early-1950s to the mid-1960s. He played for Ajax from 1951 to 1961, making 177 appearances for the side. He later capped for Holland Sport.

== Club career ==
Born in Amsterdam, he was the son and namesake of Wim Anderiesen (1903–1944).

Anderiesen played 10 years for Ajax, playing 177 official matches in their senior team (ranking 81st in the club's Club van 100) and winning two league titles with them. He later played a few seasons for SHS and Holland Sport.

== Personal life ==
In May 1945, Anderiesen was shot in the back during the Dam Square shooting in Amsterdam, when German soldiers fired at a crowd who were celebrating the German capitulation after World War II.

Anderiesen was one of the founding members of the Dutch players' union.

His father Wim Anderiesen also played for Ajax and earned 46 caps for the Netherlands national football team.

Wim Anderiesen Jr. died on 27 January 2017 in Heerhugowaard at the age of 85.
