= Fons Pelser =

Dutch footballer (1893–1974)

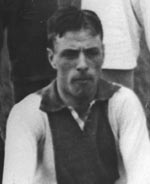
- Pelser wearing the Ajax kit

Personal information
- Full name: Alphonsius Johannes Maria Pelser
- Date of birth: 28 December 1893
- Place of birth: Nieuwer-Amstel, Netherlands
- Date of death: 2 July 1974 (aged 80)
- Place of death: Bussum, Netherlands
- Height: 1.73 m (5 ft 8 in)
- Position: Right back

Youth career
- 1908–1913: Ajax

Senior career*
Years	Team	Apps	(Gls)
1913–1926	Ajax	192	(12)

International career
1921–1922	Netherlands	6	(0)
- * Club domestic league appearances and goals

Alphonsius Johannes Maria Pelser, known as Fons Pelser, (28 December 1893 – 2 July 1974) was a Dutch footballer.

== Career ==
Pelser played for Ajax as a right back, making his senior debut in 1913. He also appeared for the Dutch national side on six occasions.

Pelser suddenly retired from football in 1926, leaving Ajax Football Club until being appointed a Member of Merit in 1938.

== Personal life ==
Fons was born in Nieuwer-Amstel, the son of Johannes Arnoldus Pelser and Hendrika Maria Slief. He was married to Adriana Petronella Maria Schaap.

His brothers Jan, Adriaan and Joop were also all footballers for Ajax, as was his nephew Harry. Fons was the youngest of the four brothers.
