= Wim Anderiesen =

Dutch footballer (1903–1944)

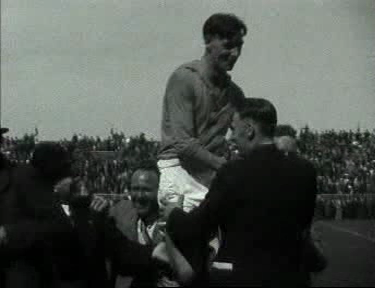

Personal information
- Full name: Willem Gerardus Anderiesen
- Date of birth: 27 November 1903
- Place of birth: Amsterdam, Netherlands
- Date of death: 18 July 1944 (aged 40)
- Place of death: Amsterdam, Netherlands
- Height: 1.79 m (5 ft 10 1/2 in)
- Position: Midfielder

Youth career
- AVVB Romein
- 1922–1923: 't Gooi

Senior career*
Years	Team	Apps	(Gls)
1923–1925	't Gooi		
1925–1940	Ajax	309	(20)

International career
1926–1939	Netherlands	46	(0)
- * Club domestic league appearances and goals

Willem Gerardus "Wim" Anderiesen (27 November 1903 – 18 July 1944) was a Dutch footballer.

== Club career ==
Born in Amsterdam, he played for Romein and 't Gooi before being admitted to Ajax, where he would play from 1925 to 1940, winning five national titles.

== International career ==
He also earned 46 caps for the Netherlands national football team, and participated in the 1934 and 1938 World Cups.

== Personal life ==
He was married to Trijntje Huizinga and had three children.

Aside from football, he was employed as typographer, police officer and doorman.

He died in 1944 from pneumonia. His son, Wim Anderiesen Jr., also played for Ajax in the 1950s and died in January 2017, aged 85.
