= René Hofman =

Dutch footballer

Personal information
- Full name: René Hofman
- Date of birth: 8 March 1961 (age 65)
- Place of birth: Heerlen, Netherlands
- Position: Winger

Youth career
- KEV
- Roda JC

Senior career*
| Years | Team | Apps | (Gls) |
| 1979–1986 | Roda JC | 184 | (43) |
| 1986–1989 | Feyenoord | 97 | (31) |
| 1989–1992 | Roda JC | 93 | (16) |
| 1992–1994 | Fortuna Sittard | 26 | (7) |
| Total | | 400 | (97) |

International career^{‡}
| 1981–1986 | Netherlands U21 | 6 | (0) |
| 1982 | Netherlands | 1 | (0) |
- * Club domestic league appearances and goals as of 9 June 2007 ‡ National team caps and goals as of 9 June 2007

René Hofman (born 8 March 1961) is a Dutch retired footballer who played as a winger. Hofman made his professional debut at Roda JC and also played for Feyenoord and Fortuna Sittard. He was capped once for the Netherlands national team.

He started playing football at local amateur side KEV.

== International career ==
Hofman played 6 games for the Netherlands national under-21 football team and once for the Olympic team.

== Personal life ==
Hofman lives in Voerendaal.

== Honours ==
- First match: 2 March 1980 : Roda JC - Sparta Rotterdam, 2-2
