= Rob Witschge =

Dutch footballer (born 1966)

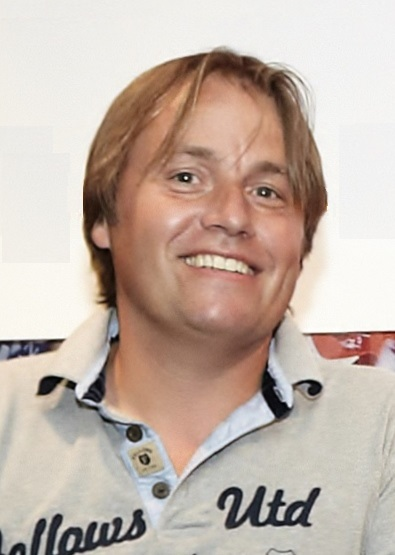
- Witschge in 2012

Personal information
- Full name: Robert Witschge
- Date of birth: 22 August 1966 (age 60)
- Place of birth: Amsterdam, Netherlands
- Height: 1.81 m (5 ft 11 in)
- Position: Midfielder

Youth career
- SDW
- Ajax

Senior career*
Years	Team	Apps	(Gls)
1985–1989	Ajax	92	(13)
1989–1990	Saint-Étienne	51	(11)
1991–1996	Feyenoord	160	(25)
1996–1997	Utrecht	29	(1)
1998–1999	Ittihad		
Total		332	(50)

International career
1989–1995	Netherlands	30	(3)

Managerial career
- 2001–2002: Haarlem (assistant)
- 2002–2004: ADO'20
- 2004–2008: Netherlands (assistant)
- 2008–2009: Ajax (assistant)
- * Club domestic league appearances and goals

Robert Witschge (born 22 August 1966) is a Dutch former professional footballer who played as a midfielder.

He spent most of his 14-year professional career with Feyenoord, but started out at Ajax, amassing Eredivisie totals of 281 matches and 39 goals.

Witschge represented the Netherlands national team in the 1994 World Cup and Euro 1992.

== Club career ==
Born in Amsterdam, North Holland, Witschge started his professional career with local Ajax, being an undisputed starter at the age of 20 and a crucial element of the team that won the 1986–87 European Cup Winners' Cup. During three seasons, he shared teams with his sibling Richard.

Witschge joined French club Saint-Étienne in July 1989 but, unsettled, returned home in January 1991 with Feyenoord. He helped the Rotterdam side win four Dutch Cups, one Supercup and the 1992–93 Eredivisie.

After one weak final year with Feyenoord – 13 appearances, no goals – the 30-year-old moved to Utrecht, retiring in 1999 after one season with Saudi Arabia's Ittihad. In 2001, Witschge took up coaching, being named assistant of Marco van Basten and John van 't Schip at the national team in 2004; he rejoined the pair at Ajax four years later, again as assistant.

== International career ==
Witschge made his debut for the Netherlands on 4 January 1989 in a friendly against Israel (2–0 away win), going on to win 30 caps (three goals) and represent the nation at UEFA Euro 1992 and the 1994 FIFA World Cup.

== Personal life ==
Witschge's younger brother, Richard, is also a former footballer and a midfielder.

Rob is related to Dutch actor Cor Witschge (1925-1991); Rob's grandfather was a cousin of Cor.

== Career statistics ==
=== International ===
Appearances and goals by national team and year
National team	Year	Apps	Goals
Netherlands	1989	3	0
Netherlands	1990	0	0
Netherlands	1991	0	0
Netherlands	1992	12	1
Netherlands	1993	3	2
Netherlands	1994	11	0
Netherlands	1995	1	0
Total		30	3

Scores and results list Netherlands' goal tally first, score column indicates score after each Witschge goal.

List of international goals scored by Rob Witschge
No.	Date	Venue	Opponent	Score	Result	Competition
1	18 June 1992	Nya Ullevi, Gothenburg, Sweden	Germany	2–0	3–1	UEFA Euro 1992
2	24 February 1993	Stadion Galgenwaard, Utrecht, Netherlands	Turkey	2–1	3–1	1994 FIFA World Cup qualification
3	24 February 1993	Stadion Galgenwaard, Utrecht, Netherlands	Turkey	3–1	3–1	1994 FIFA World Cup qualification

== Honours ==
Ajax

- KNVB Cup: 1985-86, 1986-87
- UEFA Cup Winners' Cup: 1986-87; runner-up: 1987-88

Feyenoord

- Eredivisie: 1992-93
- KNVB Cup: 1990-91, 1991-92, 1993-94, 1994-95
- Dutch Super Cup (in 1996 rebranded as Johan Cruyff Shield): 1991; runner-up: 1992, 1993, 1994, 1995
