= André Wasiman =

Dutch footballer (born 1962)

Personal information
- Date of birth: 11 April 1962 (age 64)
- Place of birth: Paramaribo, Suriname
- Height: 1.70 m (5 ft 7 in)
- Position: Midfielder

Senior career*
| Years | Team | Apps | (Gls) |
| 1980–1990 | Excelsior (Note: Only match statistics available from top-flight Eredivisie appearances.) | 117 | (7) |
| 1990–1992 | FC Eindhoven | | |
| 1992–1995 | FC Volendam | 82 | (20) |
| 1995–1997 | Dordrecht '90 | 4 | (0) |
- * Club domestic league appearances and goals

André Wasiman (born 11 April 1962) is a Dutch former professional footballer who played as a midfielder.

== Career ==
Wasiman was a product of the Excelsior youth academy, and was promoted to the first team in 1980. He made his debut as a starter under manager Hans Dorjee in a 2–1 loss in the Eredivisie to AZ '67 on 30 August 1980. He scored his first professional goal on 23 November 1980, equalizing against Roda JC in a 1–1 away draw at Gemeentelijk Sportpark Kaalheide.

In 1990, Wasiman moved to FC Eindhoven in the second-tier Eerste Divisie, scoring a brace in one of his first games against his former club Excelsior in a 4–1 win for Eindhoven.

Wasiman joined FC Volendam in 1992, where he enjoyed the most success in his career. In 1995, Volendam reached the final of the KNVB Cup for the second time in their history, facing Feyenoord. Volendam lost the match 2–1 after conceding goals by Gaston Taument and Michael Obiku, as Wasiman scored the sole goal for the club.

Between 1995 and 1997, Wasiman played in the Eerste Divisie for Dordrecht '90 before retiring from football.

== After football ==
Wasiman remained involved in the football world after his retirement, becoming a football agent. He has most famously represented Royston Drenthe, before being dismissed during the latter's transfer to Real Madrid. Instead Drenthe hired Sigi Lens, whom he deemed more experienced.

== Personal life ==
Wasiman's younger brother, Steve Wasiman, was also a professional footballer who played for Excelsior and Feyenoord.

Wasiman was part of the Colourful 11 (in Dutch Kleurrijk Elftal), a group of Surinamese men's footballers playing professionally in the Netherlands and organized as an exhibition team by Dutch Surinamese social worker Sonny Hasnoe who worked with underprivileged children in disadvantaged neighbourhoods in Amsterdam. Because Wasiman had club duties with Excelsior, he missed Surinam Airways Flight 764 which crashed during approach to Paramaribo-Zanderij, killing 176 of the 187 on board.
