= John van 't Schip =

Dutch football manager (born 1963)

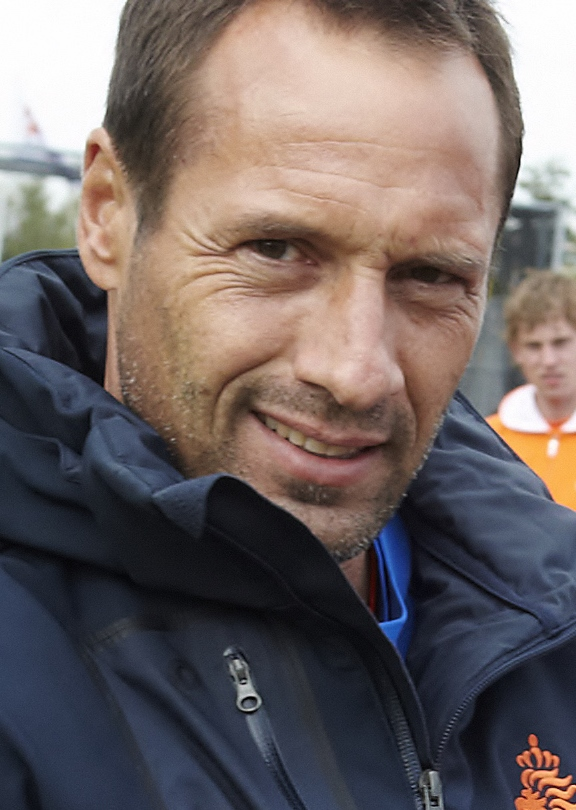
- Van 't Schip in 2012

Personal information
- Full name: Johannes Nicolaas van 't Schip
- Date of birth: 30 December 1963 (age 62)
- Place of birth: Fort St. John, Canada
- Height: 1.82 m (6 ft 0 in)
- Position: Winger

Youth career
- 1972–1976: NFC Amstelveen
- 1976–1981: Ajax

Senior career*
Years	Team	Apps	(Gls)
1981–1992	Ajax	273	(29)
1992–1996	Genoa	107	(11)
Total		380	(40)

International career
1986–1995	Netherlands	41	(2)

Managerial career
- 1997–2000: Ajax Youth
- 2001–2002: Twente
- 2002–2004: Jong Ajax
- 2009: Ajax (caretaker)
- 2010–2012: Melbourne Heart
- 2012–2013: Guadalajara
- 2013–2017: Melbourne City
- 2017–2018: PEC Zwolle
- 2019–2021: Greece
- 2023–2024: Ajax
- 2025: Armenia
- 2026: Kazakhstan
Medal record
Men's football
Representing Netherlands
UEFA European Championship
Winner	1988
Third place	1992
- * Club domestic league appearances and goals

Johannes Nicolaas "John" van 't Schip (Dutch pronunciation: [ˈdʑɔɱ vɑn ət ˈsxɪp]; born 30 December 1963) is Dutch football manager and former player who played as a winger.

Born in Canada, he played for the Netherlands national team for nine years. He spent his club career with Ajax, where they won four Eredivisie titles, a UEFA Cup and a European Cup Winners Cup, as well as Genoa. He was also a member of the Dutch side which won the 1988 European Championships.

Van 't Schip started his managerial career at the Ajax Youth Academy, and his first senior managerial gig was with Twente. He previously was the manager of PEC Zwolle in his native Netherlands and Melbourne City in Australia among others. He managed Greece from 2019 to 2021. He was then appointed as the interim manager of Ajax in 2023 until 2024. A year later he was appointed as the new manager of Armenia.

== Early life ==
Van 't Schip was born in Fort St. John, British Columbia, and was raised in Powell River, British Columbia, where he grew up playing youth football in the small community before his family moved back to the Netherlands in 1972.

== Club career ==
Van 't Schip began his football journey at NFC where he played for four years. He then began his professional career at Ajax in its youth academy. Debuting for the first team on the sixth of December 1981 in a 4–1 win against Haarlem, he spent the next eleven seasons with the club. During this period, he won the Eredivisie in 1982, 1983, 1985 and 1990, as well as the KNVB Beker in 1983, 1986 and 1987. He also helped Ajax win the 1987 European Cup Winners' Cup and the 1992 UEFA Cup. After Ajax's UEFA Cup victory, he was transferred to Italian team Genoa, where he played four seasons before ending his career. He helped the club to lift the 1996 Anglo-Italian Cup.

== International career ==
On the international level, Van 't Schip, a member of the Dutch squad at the 1983 FIFA World Youth Championship, was capped 41 times and scored two goals for the Dutch national team. His debut came against Scotland in April 1986, and his final match was a Euro qualifying match against Belarus in June 1995. Van 't Schip featured in the victorious Euro 1988 squad, as well as 1990 FIFA World Cup and Euro 1992 tournaments.

== Coaching career ==
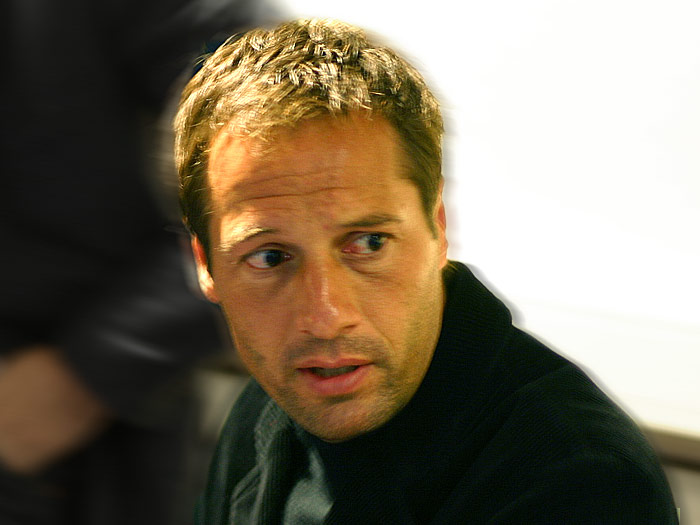
Van 't Schip in 2006

After retiring, Van 't Schip became a youth coach for Ajax and manager for Twente. From August 2004 he assisted Marco van Basten in coaching the Dutch national team, until Van Basten left the position of head coach following Euro 2008. Van 't Schip followed Van Basten to Ajax, becoming assistant coach with Rob Witschge, for the 2008–09 season. On 6 May 2009, after Marco van Basten's resignation, he was named as the interim head coach of Ajax, and coached the club till the end of the season.

=== Melbourne Heart ===
He was signed by Australian A-League club Melbourne Heart on 12 October 2009, to be their inaugural coach for the 2010–11 season. On 1 February 2012, Van 't Schip announced that he would be leaving the Melbourne Heart at the end of the 2011–12 season, citing personal reasons for his decision. Van't Schip took Heart to their first finals appearance in their second season. Van 't Schip had a major role in the development of Melbourne Heart.

=== Guadalajara ===
In April 2012, Guadalajara announced, through its Twitter account, that Van 't Schip would be the new coach of the club. Van 't Schip was recommended by his fellow countryman Johan Cruyff, who was working at that moment on a project with the club. Van 't Schip's first competitive game was against Toluca, in which the Chivas lost 2–1.

Van 't Schip was relieved of his duties as coach of Chivas a few days before the start of the Clausura 2013 Season. He was replaced by former Chivas coach Benjamin Galindo.

=== Return to Melbourne City ===
On 30 December 2013, following 17 winless games by Melbourne Heart and the early termination of John Aloisi's contract, Melbourne Heart re-appointed Van 't Schip as head coach until the end of the season.

On 19 March 2014, after eleven matches coaching the club, including a seven-match unbeaten run, Van 't Schip signed a three-year contract with the club (who would be renamed Melbourne City in June 2014), through to the end of the 2016–17 season.

On 3 January 2017, Van 't Schip resigned as Melbourne City manager to return to the Netherlands to help care for his terminally ill father.

=== Greece ===
In July 2019, he was hired as coach of Greece. On 26 November 2021, Van 't Schip resigned.

=== Return to Ajax ===
On 30 October 2023, van 't Schip was appointed as head coach of Ajax until the end of the 2023–24 season.

=== Armenia ===
On 17 February 2025, he was appointed head coach of the Armenia. On 6 August 2025, after 4 games without a win, his contract with the national team was terminated by mutual consent.

=== Kazakhstan ===
On 7 August 2026, van 't Schip was announced as the new manager for Kazakhstan.

== Personal life ==
In addition to his native Dutch, Van 't Schip can also speak English, Spanish and Italian. His mother-in-law is Dutch singer and actress Willeke Alberti.

Van 't Schip was married to Daniëlle Oonk, who passed away on October 10, 2023, she was the daughter of musician Joop Oonk and vocalist Willeke Alberti. His son Davey (October 16, 1990) plays in Australië in the Victorian Premier League for Pascoe Vale FC.

== Career statistics ==
=== International ===
Appearances and goals by national team and year
National team	Year	Apps	Goals
Netherlands	1986	5	1
Netherlands	1987	8	1
Netherlands	1988	4	0
Netherlands	1989	4	0
Netherlands	1990	6	0
Netherlands	1991	4	0
Netherlands	1992	9	0
Netherlands	1993	0	0
Netherlands	1994	0	0
Netherlands	1995	1	0
Total		41	2

Scores and results list the Netherlands' goal tally first, score column indicates score after each Van 't Schip goal.

List of international goals scored by Johan van 't Schip
No.	Date	Venue	Opponent	Score	Result	Competition
1	14 May 1986	Dortmund, West-Germany	West Germany	1–2	1–3	Friendly
2	28 October 1987	Rotterdam, Netherlands	Cyprus	5–0	8–0	UEFA Euro 1988 qualification

== Coaching record ==
As of match played 16 November 2026

Team	From	To	Record				
Team	From	To	G	W	D	L	Win %
Twente	1 July 2001	10 July 2002	40	13	12	15	32.50
Ajax (interim)	6 May 2009	30 June 2009	1	1	0	0	100.00
Melbourne Heart	1 May 2009	5 April 2012	58	17	21	20	29.31
Guadalajara	1 July 2012	3 January 2013	23	8	6	9	34.78
Melbourne Heart / Melbourne City	14 August 2013	3 January 2017	96	43	22	31	44.79
PEC Zwolle	1 July 2017	19 December 2018	57	21	11	25	36.84
Greece	31 July 2019	31 December 2021	26	11	9	6	42.31
Ajax	30 October 2023	19 May 2024	34	16	11	7	47.06
Armenia	17 February 2025	6 August 2025	4	0	1	3	0.00
Kazakhstan	7 August 2026	17 November 2026	6	0	3	3	0.00
Total			345	130	96	119	37.68

- 1.Includes League, Liguilla, Copa MX and CONCACAF Champions League.

== Honours ==
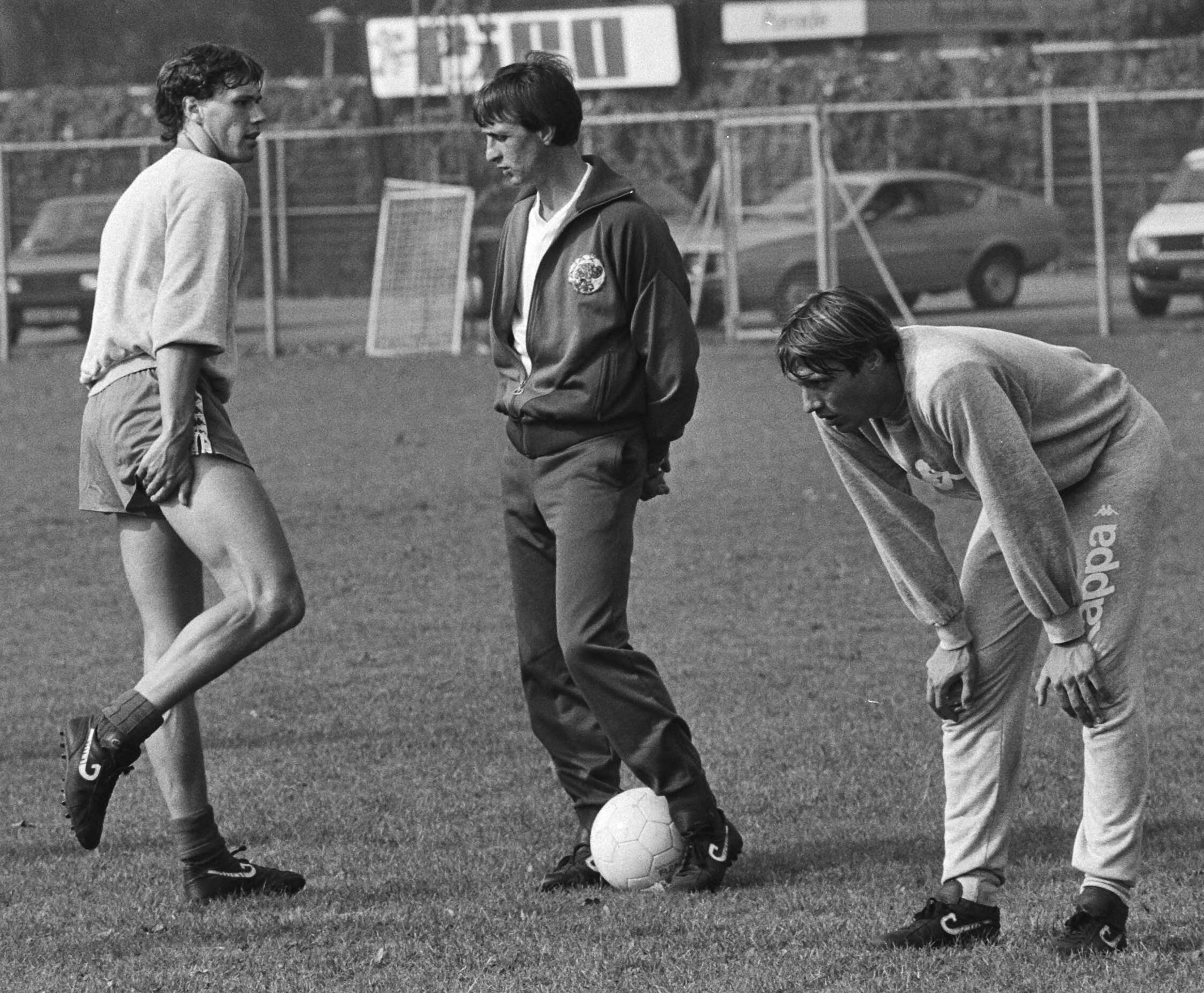
Van 't Schip (right) with Marco van Basten and Johan Cruyff at Ajax in 1985.

=== Player ===
==== Club ====
Ajax

- Eredivisie: 1981–82, 1982–83, 1984–85, 1989–90

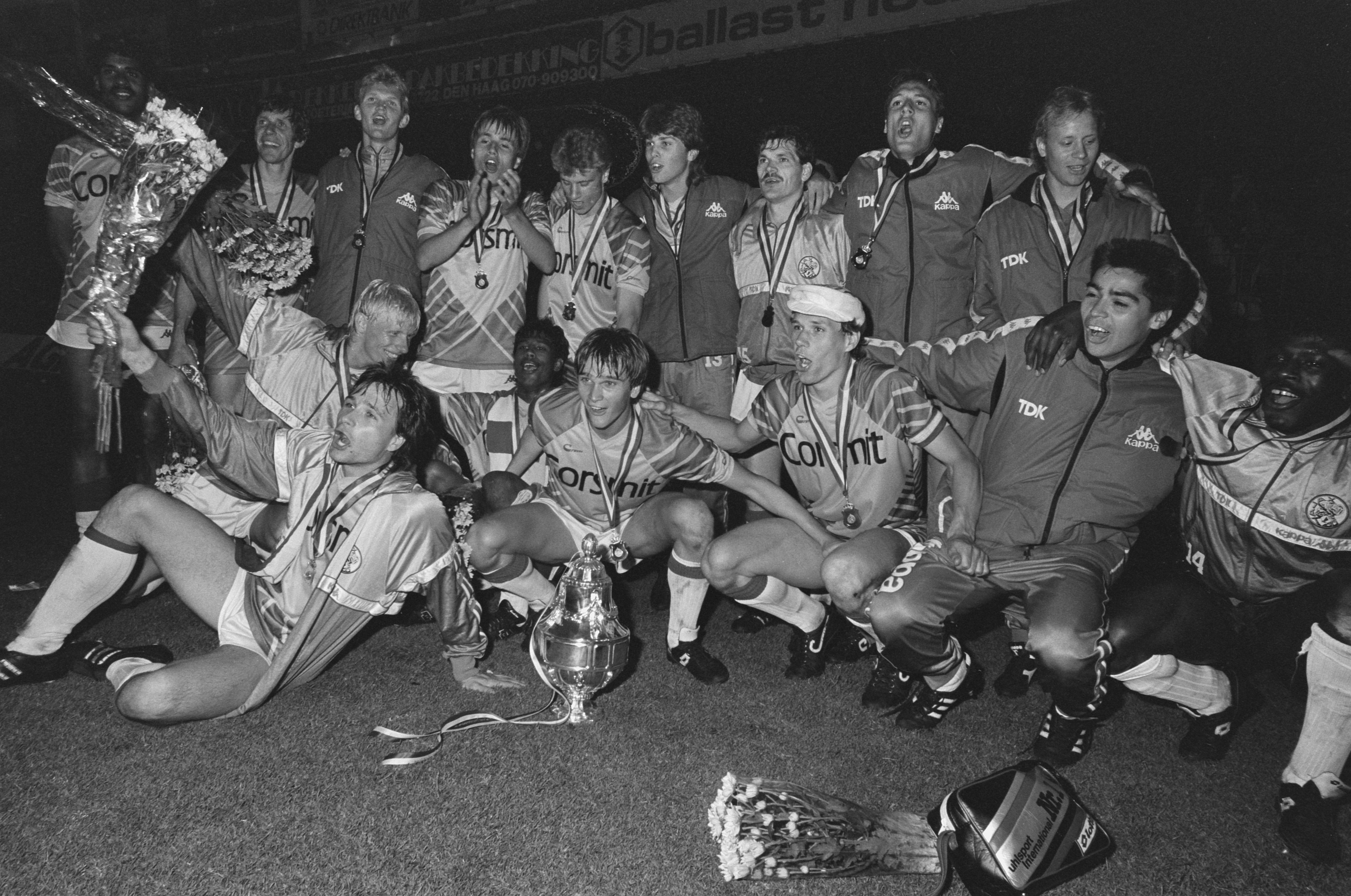
Van 't Schip (top, second from right) with Ajax teammates celebrating victory in the 1986–87 KNVB Cup.

- KNVB Cup: 1982–83, 1985–86, 1986–87
- UEFA Cup: 1991–92
- European Cup Winners' Cup: 1986–87

Genoa

- Anglo-Italian Cup: 1995–96

==== International ====
Netherlands

- UEFA European Championship: 1988

=== Manager ===
Melbourne City

- FFA Cup: 2016
