= Joop Pelser =

Dutch footballer (1892–1974)

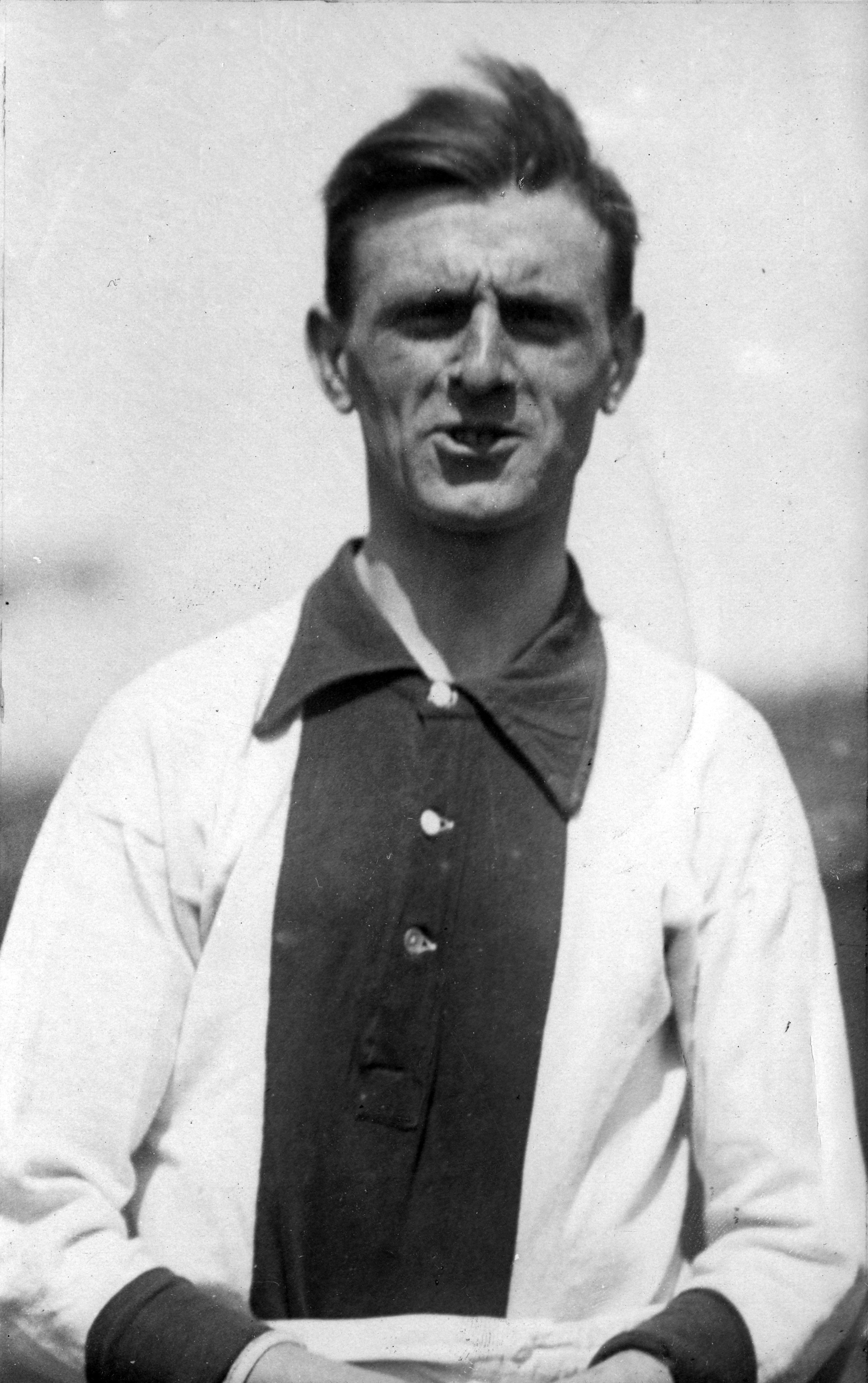
- Pelser in 1919

Personal information
- Full name: Jozef Joannes Leonardus Pelser
- Date of birth: 17 March 1892
- Place of birth: Nieuwer-Amstel, Netherlands
- Date of death: 27 July 1974 (aged 82)
- Place of death: Amsterdam, Netherlands
- Height: 1.78 m (5 ft 10 in)

Youth career
- 1908–1911: Ajax

Senior career*
Years	Team	Apps	(Gls)
1911–1924	Ajax	194	(3)
- * Club domestic league appearances and goals

Joop Pelser (17 March 1892 – 27 July 1974) was a Dutch footballer who played for Ajax.

His brothers Jan, Adriaan and Fons were also all footballers for Ajax, as was his son Harry. Another son, also named Jan, joined the Waffen-SS during World War II, and Pelser, his wife, and three sons all joined the Nationaal-Socialistische Beweging.
