= Joop Böckling =

Dutch footballer (born 1955)

Personal information
- Date of birth: 3 November 1955 (age 70)
- Place of birth: Amsterdam, Netherlands
- Position: Forward

Team information
- Current team: RCH (head coach)

Youth career
- De Eland/SDC

Senior career*
Years	Team	Apps	(Gls)
1977–1985	Haarlem	182	(63)
1985–1986	Volendam	33	(20)
1986–1987	Sparta	43	(14)
1987–1988	Volendam	17	(8)
1988–1990	Eindhoven	47	(7)
Total		322	(112)

Managerial career
- 2025-: RCH
- * Club domestic league appearances and goals

Joop Böckling (born 3 November 1955, in Amsterdam) is a Dutch retired footballer who played as a forward.

== Club career ==
He played the large part of his career for Haarlem for whom he scored a then record-equaling fastest goal of the Eredivisie after only 10 seconds in October 1981 against MVV. He also played in the 1982–83 UEFA Cup match away at Moscow Spartak which became known as the Luzhniki disaster.(Report) In 2007, he played in a remembrance game with former Haarlem players against former Spartak players.

He later played for Volendam, Sparta and Eindhoven.

== Managerial career ==
Böckling coached several amateur sides such as Hellas Sport, HFC Haarlem, Velsen, De Germaan, Ripperda, SIZO Hillegom, ROHDA'76 Bodegraven and SV Vogelenzang In May 2025 he was appointed manager of RCH after four years at HBC and three years as an assistant coach at Haarlem-Kennemerland FC.

== Personal life ==
After retiring as a player, Böckling worked as a sales representative for sports brands Umbro and Diadora and later started his own marketing bureau. He has two children from his first marriage.
