= Edo Ophof =

Dutch footballer and sports executive

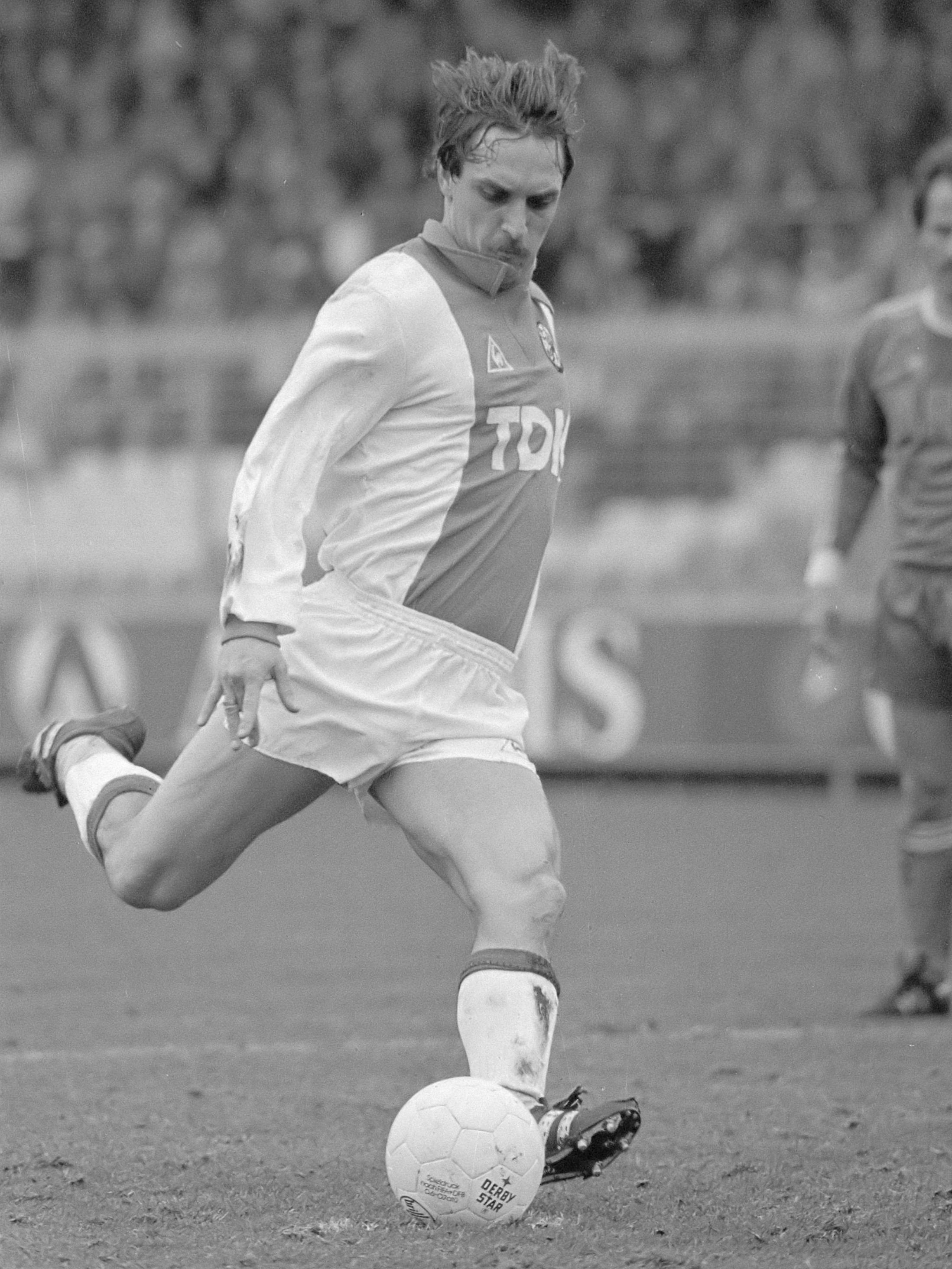
- Edo Ophof in 1983

Personal information
- Full name: Edo Ophof
- Date of birth: 21 May 1959 (age 67)
- Place of birth: Rhenen, Utrecht, Netherlands
- Height: 1.75 m (5 ft 9 in)
- Positions: Defender; midfielder

Team information
- Current team: Ajax (Supervisory Board)

Senior career*
Years	Team	Apps	(Gls)
1976–1980	NEC	65	(5)
1980–1988	Ajax	158	(16)
1988–1989	AZ	32	(8)
1989–1990	Utrecht	14	(0)

International career
1981–1985	Netherlands	15	(2)
- * Club domestic league appearances and goals

Edo Ophof (born 21 May 1959) is a Dutch former professional footballer and current sports executive who serves on the Supervisory Board of AFC Ajax. During his playing career, he operated primarily as a defender and midfielder, most notably for Ajax and the Netherlands national team.

== Playing career ==
Ophof began his professional career with NEC Nijmegen in 1976. After four seasons, he transferred to Ajax in 1980. Operating as a versatile right-sided defender and defensive midfielder, he became a regular fixture in the Ajax squad throughout the 1980s. During his eight-year spell in Amsterdam, he made 158 league appearances and scored 16 goals.

At Ajax, he played alongside—and later under the management of—Johan Cruyff, establishing a reputation as a loyal and hard-working squad player. With the club, Ophof won three Eredivisie titles, three KNVB Cups, and the 1986–87 European Cup Winners' Cup.

Following injuries toward the end of his time at Ajax, Ophof initially stepped away from professional football to work as a marketing and PR manager for the sports brand Lotto. However, he was convinced to return to the pitch by manager Hans Eijkenbroek, joining AZ Alkmaar in 1988. At AZ, Ophof was deployed almost exclusively as a central midfielder, scoring 8 goals in 32 appearances. He spent his final professional year with FC Utrecht, officially retiring in 1990. Across his domestic career, he recorded 277 official appearances and 25 goals.

At the international level, Ophof earned 15 caps and scored two goals for the Netherlands national football team between 1981 and 1985. He made his official debut for the Oranje in a 1–0 home victory against France.

== Executive career ==
Following his retirement from playing, Ophof transitioned into business and sports management. He held international management positions at Lotto Benelux and served as the CEO of Technische Metaal Industrie. He later returned to professional football, serving as the Technical Director of his former club, NEC Nijmegen, in the early 2010s.

He subsequently worked as an independent sports management consultant and held a position on the Ajax association board (Bestuursraad). As one of the nine members of the board, Ophof helped manage the association's 73% majority shareholding in the club's publicly traded NV, tasked with safeguarding the club's footballing culture.

On 20 January 2026, Ophof was nominated to join the Supervisory Board (Raad van Commissarissen) of AFC Ajax. His appointment was formally approved by shareholders during an Extraordinary General Meeting on 9 March 2026. He succeeded former teammate Danny Blind as the board's technical football commissioner. In this capacity, Ophof is responsible for overseeing the club's football operations and the technical policy executed by the newly appointed Technical Director, Jordi Cruyff. Dutch media highlighted the historical dynamic of the appointment, noting that Ophof, who had served as a player under Johan Cruyff, was now tasked with supervising the executive work of Cruyff's son.

== Honours ==
Ajax

- Eredivisie: 1981–82, 1982–83, 1984–85
- KNVB Cup: 1982–83, 1985–86, 1986–87
- UEFA Cup Winners' Cup: 1986–87
