= Jan Schubert =

Dutch footballer

Personal information
- Date of birth: 7 March 1910
- Date of death: 20 December 1960 (aged 50)

International career
Years	Team	Apps	(Gls)
1939	Netherlands	2	(0)

Jan Schubert (7 March 1910 – 20 December 1960) was a Dutch footballer. He played in two matches for the Netherlands national football team in 1939.

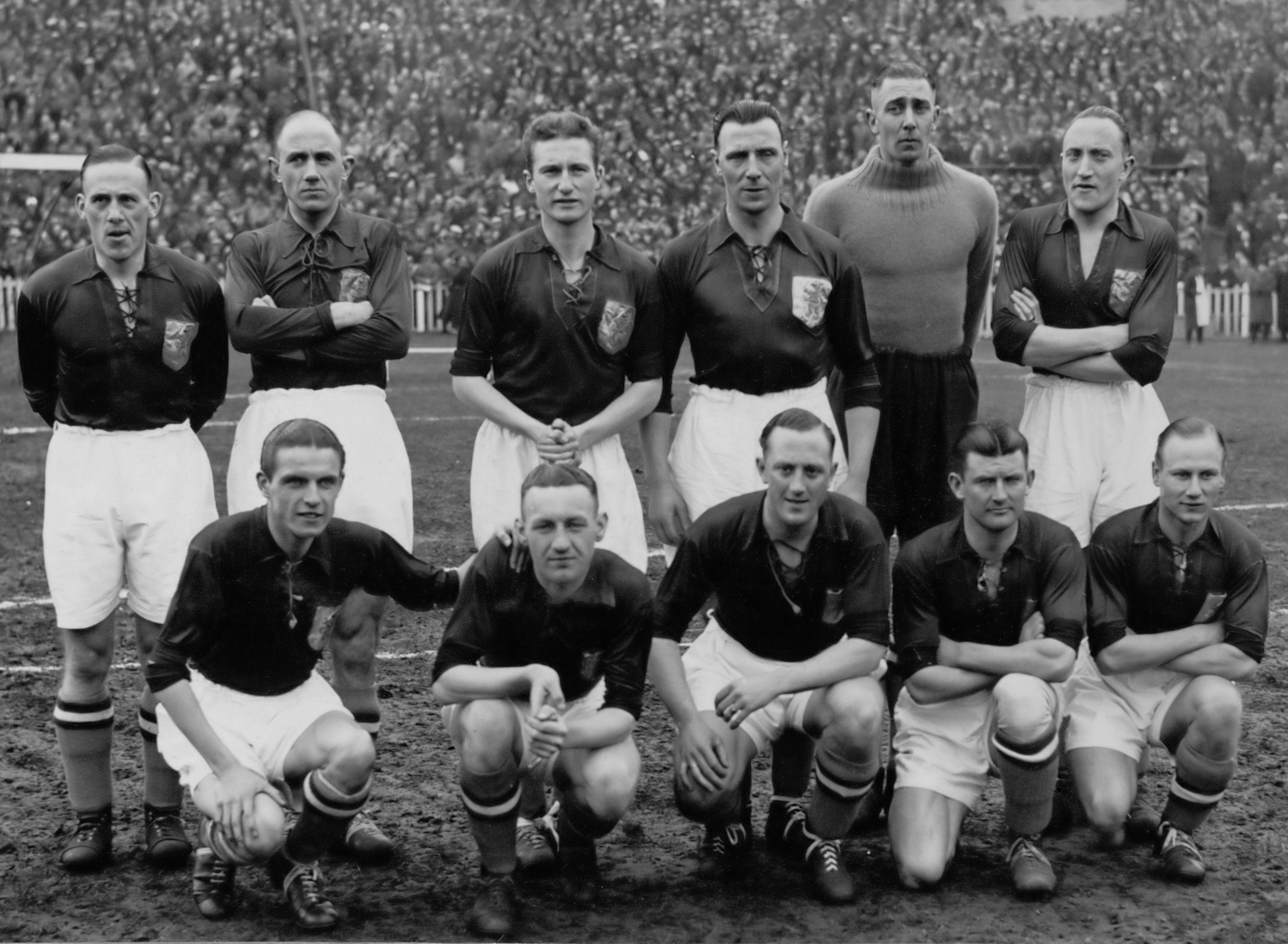
Dutch national team 1939
