= Peter Boeve =

Dutch footballer and coach (born 1957)

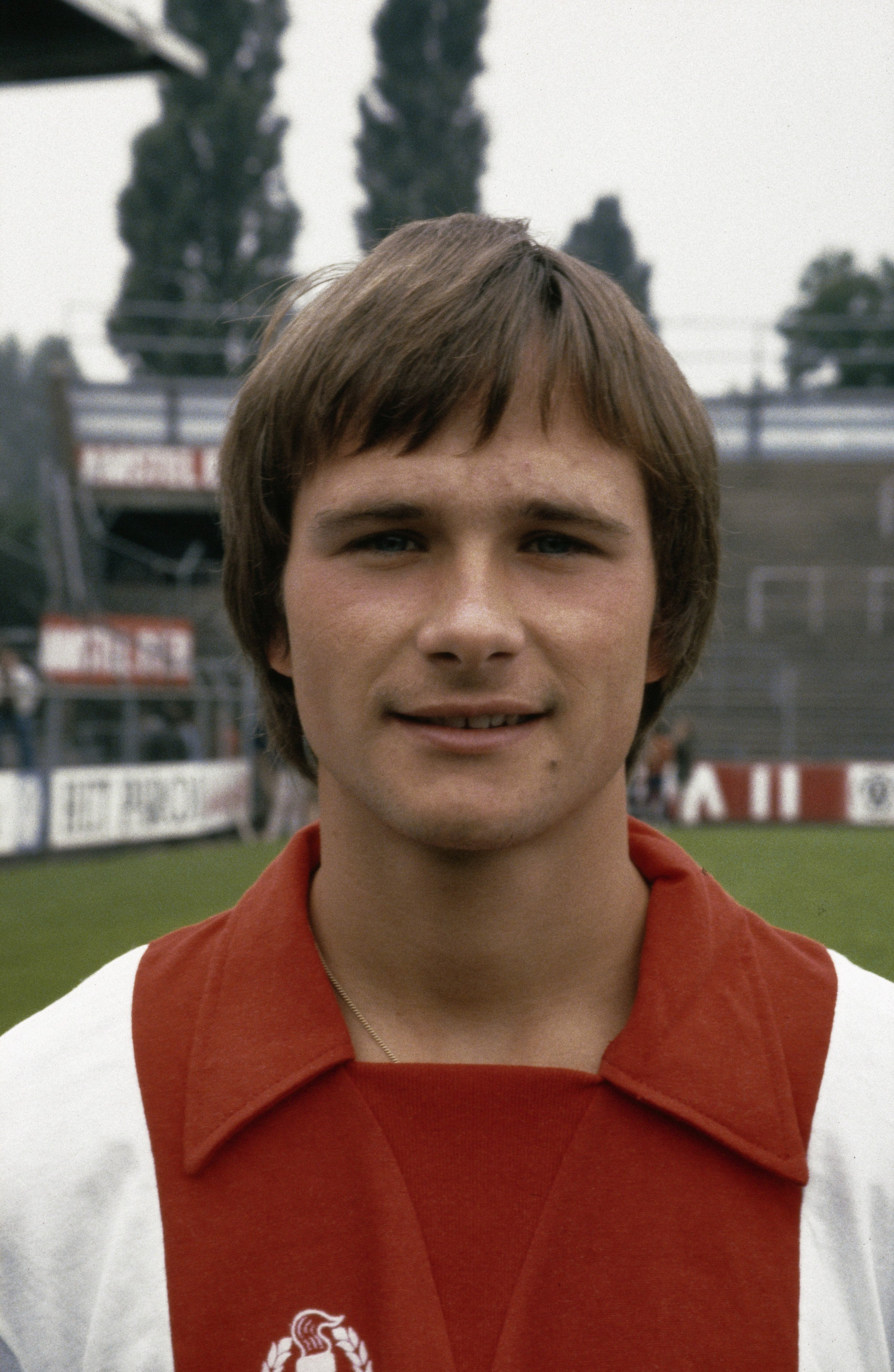
- Peter Boeve in 1979

Personal information
- Date of birth: 14 March 1957 (age 69)
- Place of birth: Staverden, Netherlands
- Position: Left back

Youth career
- SV Prins Bernhard Uddel

Senior career*
Years	Team	Apps	(Gls)
1975–1979	Vitesse	35	(2)
1979–1988	Ajax	228	(14)
1988	Beerschot	13	(0)
Total		276	(16)

International career
1978-1981	Netherlands U-21	4	(0)
1982–1986	Netherlands	16	(0)

Managerial career
- 1993–1994: Geinoord
- 1994–1995: DOVO
- 1995–1997: DVS '33
- 1997–1998: RKC
- 1999–2000: Willem II (assistant)
- 2000–2001: Ajax (assistant)
- 2002–2003: FC Zwolle
- 2004–2006: HSC '21
- 2006–2007: Be Quick '28
- 2007–2009: FC Omniworld
- 2011–2012: Zulte Waregem (assistant)
- 2013–2015: Trenčín (assistant)
- 2015–2017: CSV Apeldoorn
- * Club domestic league appearances and goals

Peter Boeve (born 14 March 1957) is a Dutch retired footballer who played for Ajax, Vitesse, Beerschot and the Netherlands national team.

During his career, while playing for Ajax, he was four times champion of Netherlands, three time Netherlands' Cup winner and a winner of European Cup Winners' Cup.

== Playing career ==
=== Club ===
Marauding left back Boeve grew up in Uddel and started his career at Vitesse and left them for Dutch giants Ajax in 1979. The Ajax defense had much to contend with in terms of injuries. The defender was especially quick and constructive and very strong offensively. This fitted well in the game system that Ajax played, where supporters could push the attack. Boeve would retain his place as an emerging left-wingback and played as many as 296 official matches for the club, 228 games of them in the league. On 10 February 1980 Boeve scored Ajax's 2000th league goal since the introduction of the Eredivisie in season 1956/1957 (although it is claimed by some sources that Charles Bonsink was). Boeve scored 0-2 in the match Ajax-Haarlem (1-3 final score). Ajax with Boeve were four times champion (1979/80, 1981/82, 1982/83 and 1984/1985), four times runners up (1980/81, 1985/86, 1986/87 and 1987/88) and once third (1983/84). At Ajax Boeve was five times a KNVB Cup finalist (1979/80, 1980/81, 1982/83, 1985/86 and 1986/87, the last three seasons emerging as the cup winners). Ajax reached the 1979/80 European Cup semi-final (goal difference +23 (31-8)), and in 1986/87, won the European Cup Winners' Cup. On 16 September 1987 Boeve got injured in a match against the Irish team Dundalk. In an unfortunate collision with an opponent he broke a rib and punctured a lung, but he played on. He would never return to the first team. After several matches in the second team, he decided to move to Belgian club Beerschot VAC. Boeve was considered one of the best left backs of his generation (in a constructive and offensive way).

=== International ===
Boeve played 4 games for the Netherlands national under-21 football team and made his senior debut for the Netherlands in a May 1982 friendly match against England and earned a total number of 16 caps for his country without scoring any goal. His final international was a May 1986 friendly match against West Germany.

== Managerial career ==
After retiring as a footballer Boeve became active as a manager. Initially at amateur clubs Geinoord, DOVO and DVS '33, then he switched to professional football. As head coach, he joined RKC Waalwijk in 1997. After just over one year, he was discharged and went to work as an assistant to successful head coach Co Adriaanse at Willem II. He followed Adriaanse when the latter moved to Ajax, but Boeve rejected different jobs at the club after Adriaanse was dismissed. Boeve signed as coach of FC Zwolle in 2002. He was sacked by Zwolle in September 2003 after 'losing the dressing room' according to the club's directors. As of July 1, 2007 Boeve was again active in professional football as the new coach of FC Omniworld Almere after managing amateur sides HSC'21 and Be Quick '28. Here he was discharged on January 28, 2009 due to disappointing results. As of the 2011/12 season he was assistant to head coach Darije Kalezic at the Belgian SV Zulte Waregem, only to leave the club in January 2012 after Kalezic was sacked a month earlier. In September 2013 he became assistant at AS Trenčín.

Boeve is in charge of CSV Apeldoorn since the 2015/16 season.

== Sidelines ==
On 14 December 2010, Boeve was voted in Ajax' Members Council after Johan Cruijff and Keje Molenaar called for more former Ajax players in the committee.

== Personal life ==
Boeve lives in Uddel and has been married to Hanneke Volkers since 1983. They have three sons. His father, Peter Boeve Sr., started the Alpuro company in 1963 and made a fortune in calve-breeding, making 462nd in the Dutch 500 Rich list in 2000.

== Honours ==
Ajax

- KNVB Cup

1983, 1986 and 1987

- European Cup Winners' Cup

1987
