= Ronald Spelbos =

Dutch footballer and manager

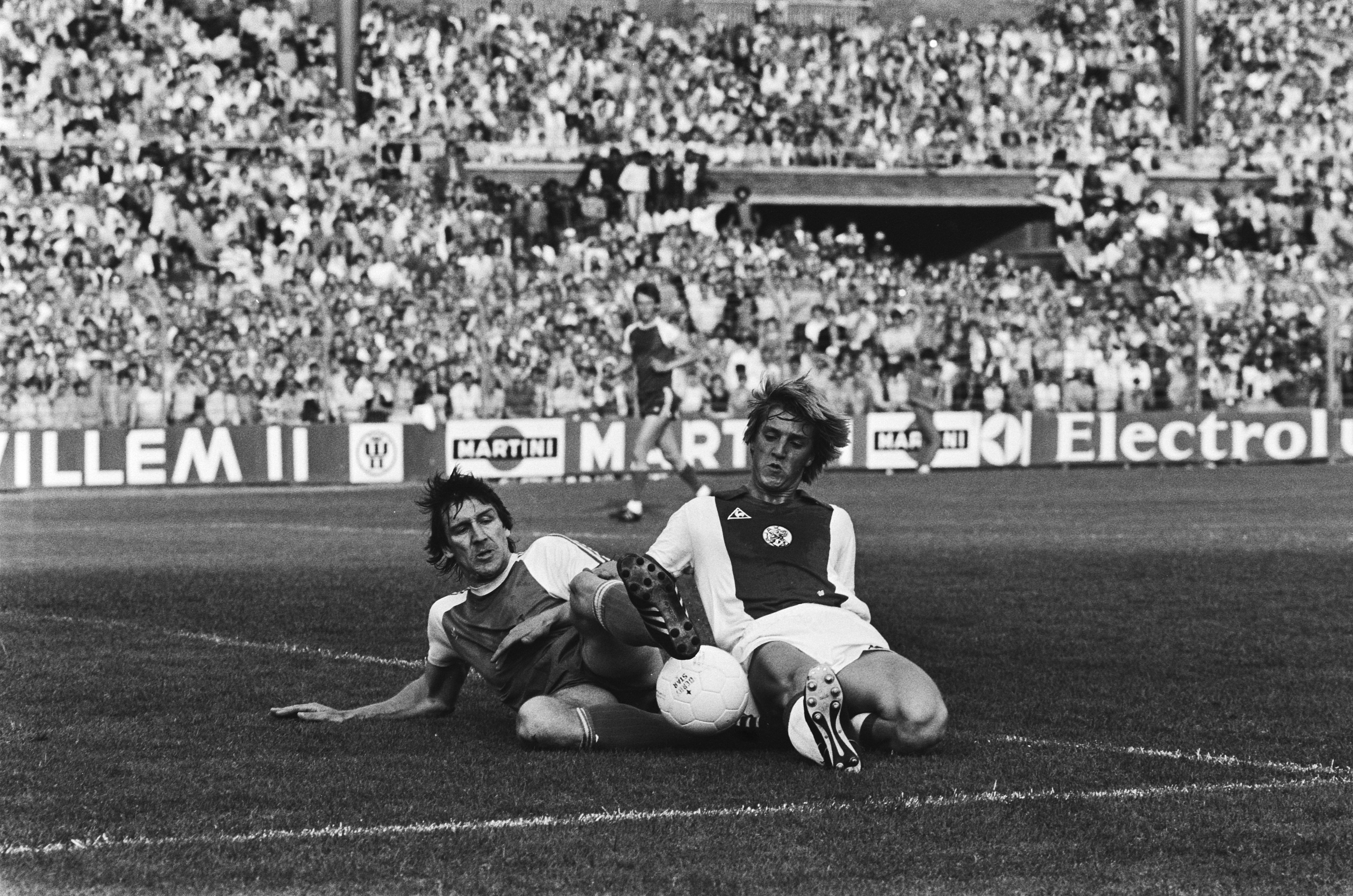
- 15-5-1982 Nr. 1 against nr. 3 of the table: Ajax-AZ'67 3-2. Spelbos (left, AZ'67) and Wim Kieft (Ajax).

Personal information
- Date of birth: 8 July 1954 (age 72)
- Place of birth: Utrecht, Netherlands
- Position: Central defender

Youth career
- 1971–1974: HVC Amersfoort

Senior career*
Years	Team	Apps	(Gls)
1974–1982	AZ	241	(10)
1982–1984	Club Brugge	62	(11)
1984–1988	Ajax	95	(19)

International career
1980–1987	Netherlands	21	(1)

Managerial career
- 1992–1995: NAC Breda
- 1995: Vitesse Arnhem
- 1996–1997: FC Utrecht
- 1998–1999: NAC Breda
- * Club domestic league appearances and goals

Ronald Spelbos (born 8 July 1954 in Utrecht) is a Dutch former football player and manager. He played central defense. He earned 21 caps for the Netherlands, scoring a goal in his last international, against Cyprus on 28 October 1987 in an 8-0 win that was later annulled because of crowd violence. He was a candidate to be selected for the Dutch team in the 1988 European Championships, but suffered a knee injury which ended his career.

== Honours ==
- Eredivisie
  - Winners (2): 1981 & 1985
- KNVB Cup
  - Winners (5): 1978, 1981, 1982, 1986 & 1987
- UEFA Cup Winners' Cup
  - Winners (1): 1987
