= 1986–87 KNVB Cup =

Tournament details
- Country: Netherlands
- Teams: 64

Final positions
- Champions: Ajax
- Runners-up: FC Den Haag

Tournament statistics
- Top goal scorer: Marco Van Basten (7)

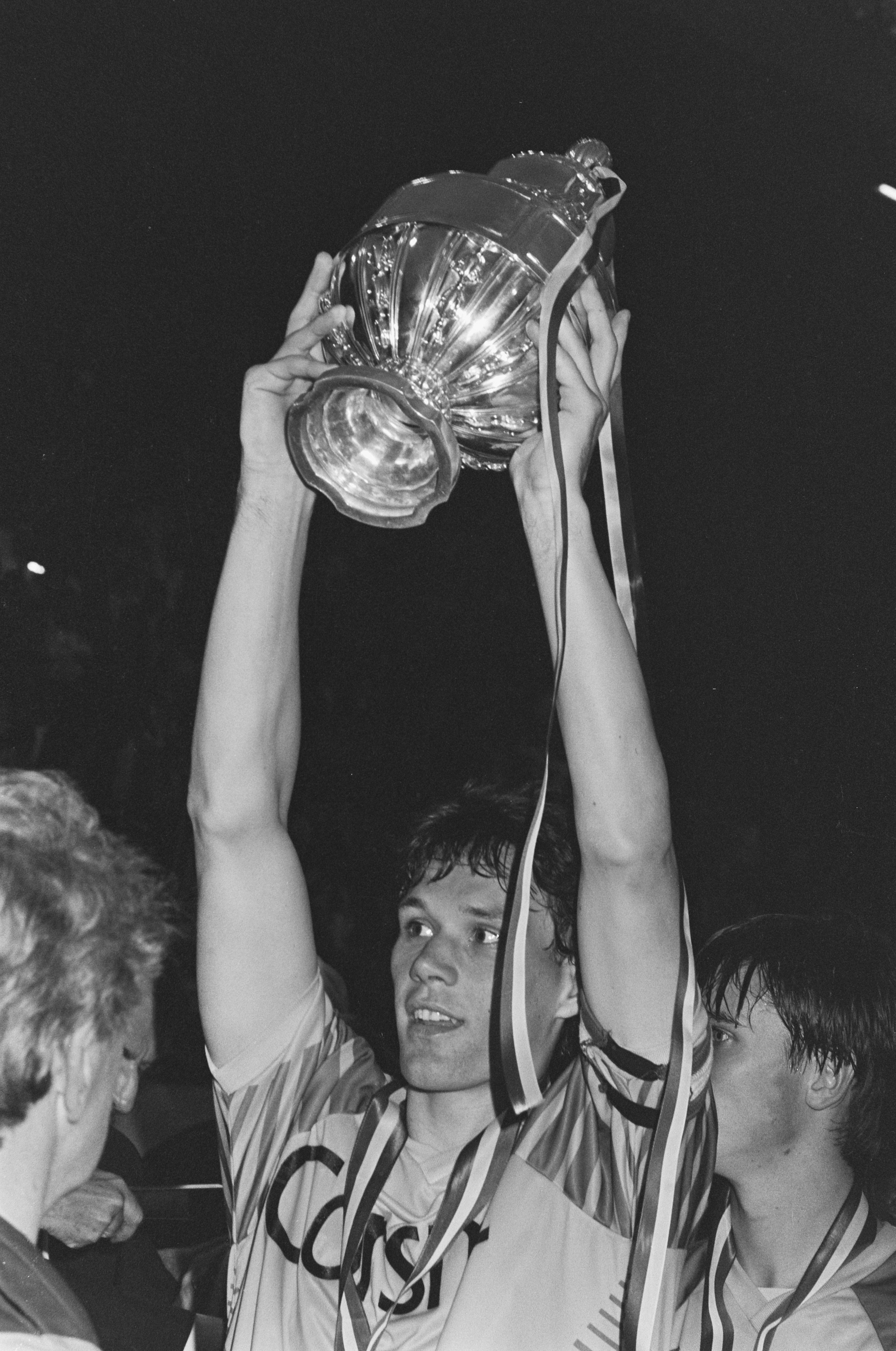
Marco Van Basten of Ajax with the KNVB cup trophy

The 1986-87 KNVB Cup was the 69th edition of the Dutch national football annual knockout tournament for the KNVB Cup. 46 teams contested, beginning on 11 October 1986 and ending at the final on 5 June 1987.

Ajax beat FC Den Haag 4–2 and won the cup for the eleventh time.

== Teams ==
- All 18 participants of the Eredivisie 1986-87
- All 19 participants of the Eerste Divisie 1986-87
- 26 teams from lower (amateur) leagues
- One youth team

== First round ==
The matches of the first round were played on 11-12 October 1986.

Home team	Result	Away team
VV Heerjansdam _{A}	0–2	FC Den Bosch _{E}
Kozakken Boys _{A}	1–2 (aet)	SC Veendam _{E}
VV Noordwijk _{A}	3–1	Telstar _{1}
Quick Boys _{A}	0–3	SVV _{1}
VV Rheden _{A}	2–2 (p: 6–5)	Helmond Sport _{1}
SC Cambuur _{1}	1–6	FC Den Haag _{E}
sc Heerenveen _{1}	2–4	FC Volendam _{1}
VV Sittard _{A}	0–2	Feyenoord _{E}
RKSV Sparta '25 _{A}	0–5	FC Twente _{E}
Young Sparta	2–1	Roda JC _{E}
SC Enschede _{A}	1–0	NAC Breda _{1}
TOP Oss _{A}	0–4	PSV _{E}
De Treffers _{A}	1–3	Vitesse Arnhem _{1}
GVV Unitas _{A}	1–2	De Graafschap _{1}
VC Vlissingen _{A}	1–4	VVV _{E}
IJsselmeervogels _{A}	1–2	SC Heracles _{1}

Home team	Result	Away team
Achilles'29 _{A}	2–1	RBC _{1}
ACV _{A}	2–2 (p: 4-3)	FC Wageningen _{1}
AFC _{A}	2–5	RKC Waalwijk _{1}
AZS _{A}	0–1	MVV _{1}
BVV Barendrecht _{A}	0–7	PEC Zwolle _{E}
VV Bennekom _{A}	0–4	Excelsior _{E}
DETO _{A}	1–2	HFC Haarlem _{E}
DS '79 _{1}	3–2	Go Ahead Eagles _{E}
VV DWV _{A}	3–0	NEC _{1}
FC Eindhoven _{1}	1–2	FC Groningen _{E}
USV Elinkwijk _{A}	1–4	Ajax _{E}
FC Emmen _{1}	1–4 (aet)	AZ _{E}
Enter Vooruit _{A}	1–6	Sparta _{E}
Flevo Boys _{A}	0–2	Fortuna Sittard _{E}
VV Geldrop/AEK _{A}	3–2	Willem II _{1}
GVVV _{A}	0–5	FC Utrecht _{E}

_{E} Eredivisie; _{1} Eerste Divisie; _{A} Amateur teams

== Second round ==
The matches of the second round were played on November 15 and 16, 1986.

Home team	Result	Away team
PSV	6–1	RKC Waalwijk
VV Rheden	0–2	Ajax
Heracles Almelo	1–3	Feyenoord
Sparta	3–0	AZ
Young Sparta	1–2	FC Utrecht
SV Enschede	1–7	FC Den Haag
SVV	1–7	FC Twente
Vitesse Arnhem	2–1	FC Volendam

Home team	Result	Away team
Achilles'29	1–5	VVV
ACV	1–2	FC Den Bosch
VV DWV	1–3	Fortuna Sittard
Excelsior	3–2	SC Veendam
FC Groningen	3–1	MVV
De Graafschap	2–1	HFC Haarlem
VV Noordwijk	1–2	VV Geldrop/AEK
PEC Zwolle	2–3 (aet)	DS '79

== Round of 16 ==
The matches of the round of 16 were played on March 10 and 11, 1987.

Home team	Result	Away team
Feyenoord	1–2 (aet)	FC Den Haag (on Feb. 22)
DS '79	2–1	FC Utrecht
Excelsior	1–0	FC Twente
FC Den Bosch	2–2 (p: 4–2)	PSV
Sparta Rotterdam	0–0 (p: 3–4)	Ajax
Vitesse Arnhem	1–1 (p: 4–3)	De Graafschap
VVV	1–2	Fortuna Sittard
FC Groningen	4–2	VV Geldrop/AEK (on Mar. 24)

== Quarter finals ==
The quarter finals were played between March 29 and April 1, 1987. Instead of extra time, a replay was played if necessary.

Home team	Result	Away team
Ajax	2–0	Vitesse Arnhem
DS '79	0–0	FC Den Bosch
FC Den Haag	3–1	Excelsior
Fortuna Sittard	1–2	FC Groningen

=== Replay ===
The replay was played on April 15, 1987.

Home team	Result	Away team
FC Den Bosch	3–1	DS '79

== Semi-finals ==
The semi-finals were played on May 5, 1987. Instead of extra time, a replay was played if necessary.

Home team	Result	Away team
Ajax	0–0	FC Groningen
FC Den Bosch	0–3	FC Den Haag

=== Replay ===
The replay was played on May 19, 1987.

Home team	Result	Away team
FC Groningen	0–3	Ajax

== Final ==
5 June 1987

Den Haag	2–4 (a.e.t.)	Ajax
Boere 43'; Morley 66'		Bosman 11', 83'; Van Basten 104', 106'

Zuiderpark Stadion, The Hague
Attendance: 8,600
Referee: Ignace van Swieten

Ajax had won the Cup Winners' Cup tournament this year, therefore the Netherlands were allowed to send two teams to next year's edition of 1987–88. This way, finalists FC Den Haag also qualified.
