= 2003–04 Sparta Rotterdam season =

Sparta Rotterdam
2003–2004 season
- Manager: Mike Snoei
- Eerste Divisie: 3rd place
- KNVB Cup: Semifinals
- Top goalscorer: League: Ricky van den Bergh (17); All: Ricky van den Bergh (22)
Home colours	Away colours

In 2003–2004, Sparta Rotterdam, a club founded in 1888, played its second season in the Dutch Second League. In the 2001–2002 season, the team relegated for the first time in history by ending up in 17th place in the Eredivisie, and fourth in the play-offs for promotion and relegation ("nacompetitie"). Former Sparta defender Mike Snoei was the successor of Chris Dekker as Sparta's manager.

== Matches ==
Win Tie Loss

=== Eerste Divisie ===
2003-08-16	Sparta	6–1	De Graafschap	Rotterdam
	Van den Bergh 1', 59', 61'; Koevermans 14'; Levchenko 20' (pen.); De Fauw 82'		Hertog 38' (pen.)	Stadium: Het Kasteel

2003-08-22	FC Den Bosch	2–0	Sparta	Den Bosch
	Michels 11'; Van de Laak 51'			Stadium: De Vliert

2003-08-29	Sparta	2–0	Cambuur Leeuwarden	Rotterdam
	Mendes da Silva 33'; Van den Bergh 63'			Stadium: Het Kasteel

2003-09-01	BV Veendam	0–5	Sparta	Veendam
			Bechan 6', 74'; Rimkus 20'; Van den Bergh 21'; Koevermans 52'	Stadium: De Langeleegte

2003-09-05	Sparta	3–0	HFC Haarlem	Rotterdam
	Van den Bergh 16'; Koevermans 53' (pen.), 66'			Stadium: Het Kasteel

2003-09-12	MVV Maastricht	0–3	Sparta	Maastricht
			De Fauw 33'; Nascimento 70', 80'	Stadium: De Geusselt

2003-09-19	Go Ahead Eagles	2–3	Sparta	Deventer
	Yildirim 87'; Zijm 88'		Bechan 72'; Mustapha 81'; Broers 89'	Stadium: Adelaarshorst

2003-09-26	Sparta	1–2	FC Dordrecht	Rotterdam
	Koevermans 15'		Rimkus 17' (o.g.); Onyeike 74'	Stadium: Het Kasteel

2003-10-03	Fortuna Sittard	1–1	Sparta	Sittard
	Van der Hoeven 62'		Levchenko 69'	Stadium: Wagner & Partners

2003-10-17	FC Emmen	1–1	Sparta	Emmen
	Berger 66'		Koevermans 7'	Stadium: Univé Stadion

2003-10-21	Sparta	0–3	Helmond Sport	Rotterdam
			Aelbrecht 30'; Linssen 36', 70'	Stadium: Het Kasteel

2003-10-21	Sparta	3–2	VVV-Venlo	Rotterdam
	Mendes da Silva 8'; Koevermans 33'; Van den Bergh 45'		Leemans 23'; Van Galen 69'	Stadium: Het Kasteel

2003-10-31	AGOVV Apeldoorn	1–2	Sparta	Apeldoorn
	Lopes Monteiro 34'		De Fauw 45'; Van den Bergh 73'	Stadium: Berg & Bos

2003-11-09	Sparta	4–1	Telstar	Rotterdam
	Levchenko 25' (pen.), 74'; Koevermans 52'; Mustapha 67'		Kantelberg 48'	Stadium: Het Kasteel

2003-11-14	TOP Oss	0–4	Sparta	Oss
			Koevermans 6', 30'; Mustapha 17'; Broers 42'	Stadium: TOP Oss Stadion

2003-11-21	Sparta	1–2	Heracles Almelo	Rotterdam
	Schenkel 39'		Rose 26'; Hoogeveen 85'	Stadium: Het Kasteel

2003-11-28	SBV Excelsior	1–0	Sparta	Rotterdam
	Buijs 30'			Stadium: Stadion Woudestein

2003-12-05	Sparta	4–1	FC Eindhoven	Rotterdam
	Van den Bergh 32', 42'; Levchenko 34'; Broers 72'		Ayaz 53'	Stadium: Het Kasteel

2003-12-19	Cambuur Leeuwarden	1–2	Sparta	Leeuwarden
	Siberie 61'		Broers 25'; De Fauw 29'	Stadium: Cambuur Stadion

2004-01-30	Sparta	3–1	BV Veendam	Rotterdam
	Bechan 11'; Van den Bergh 67'; De Nooijer 90'		Hamming 87'	Stadium: Het Kasteel

2004-02-06	De Graafschap	1–0	Sparta	Doetinchem
	Schenkel 23' (o.g.)			Stadium: De Vijverberg

2004-02-13	Sparta	2–2	FC Den Bosch	Rotterdam
	Schenkel 41' (pen.); De Fauw 75'		Burg 38'; Schut 88'	Stadium: Het Kasteel

2004-02-20	HFC Haarlem	4–3	Sparta	Haarlem
	Ten Heuvel 39'; Verweij 49'; Mulders 69'; Van Metelen 88'		Schenkel 71' (pen.); Van den Bergh 78'; De Nooijer 90'	Stadium: Haarlem Stadion

2004-02-27	Sparta	1–0	MVV Maastricht	Rotterdam
	Schenkel 2'			Stadium: Het Kasteel

2004-03-05	Sparta	2–1	Go Ahead Eagles	Rotterdam
	Schenkel 11'; Levchenko 67'		De Zeeuw 75'	Stadium: Het Kasteel

2004-03-12	FC Dordrecht	0–0	Sparta	Dordrecht
				Stadium: GN Bouw Stadion

2004-03-22	Helmond Sport	0–2	Sparta	Helmond
			Koevermans 19'; Bechan 69'	Stadium: De Braak

2004-03-26	Sparta	4–1	AGOVV Apeldoorn	Rotterdam
	Koevermans 14', 32', 63'; Van den Bergh 66'		Huntelaar 70'	Stadium: Het Kasteel

2004-04-02	Telstar	1–1	Sparta	Velsen
	Lettinga 77'		Koevermans 44'	Stadium: Schoonenberg Stadion

2004-04-05	Sparta	1–0	Fortuna Sittard	Rotterdam
	Mendes da Silva 43'			Stadium: Het Kasteel

2004-04-09	Sparta	3–4	FC Emmen	Rotterdam
	Van den Bergh 4'; Levchenko 6'; Mustapha 84'		Schenkel 40' (o.g.); Wessels 53'; Derksen 64'; Berger 76' (pen.)	Stadium: Het Kasteel

2004-04-12	VVV-Venlo	5–2	Sparta	Venlo
	Hofstede 8', 31'; Van Loenhout 45' (pen.); Jacobs 55'; Jans 57'		Mendes da Silva 7'; De Fauw 72'	Stadium: De Koel

2004-04-16	Sparta	0–0	TOP Oss	Rotterdam
				Stadium: Het Kasteel

2004-04-23	Heracles Almelo	0–1	Sparta	Almelo
			Levchenko 8'	Stadium: Polman Stadion

2004-04-29	Sparta	3–2	SBV Excelsior	Rotterdam
	Van Dieren 1' (o.g.); Broers 49'; Van den Bergh 73'		El Hamdaoui 40'; Van Dieren 83'	Stadium: Het Kasteel

2004-05-07	FC Eindhoven	0–3	Sparta	Eindhoven
			Van den Bergh 5', 40'; Bechan 59'	Stadium: Jan Louwers Stadion

=== Nacompetitie ===
2004-05-19	Sparta	1–3	Vitesse Arnhem	Rotterdam
	Levchenko 20'		Hofs 34', 90'; Rink 70'	Stadium: Het Kasteel

2004-05-22	Helmond Sport	2–2	Sparta	Helmond
	Schulp 4', 52'		Koevermans 41'; Bechan 72'	Stadium: Stadion De Braak

2004-05-25	VVV-Venlo	0–2	Sparta	Venlo
			Van den Bergh 46'; Willems 62'	Stadium: De Koel

2004-05-28	Sparta	1–1	VVV-Venlo	Rotterdam
	Koevermans 9'		Van Bergen 90'	Stadium: Het Kasteel

2004-05-31	Sparta	2–2	Helmond Sport	Rotterdam
	Van den Bergh 41', 61'		Oomens 52'; Van Bakel 85'	Stadium: Het Kasteel

2004-06-03	Vitesse Arnhem	2–0	Sparta	Arnhem
	Mbamba 64'; Van Vossen 70'			Stadium: Gelredome

=== Amstel Cup ===
2003-08-12	Westlandia	0–4	Sparta	Naaldwijk
			Koevermans 1', 27'; Broers 17'; Bechan 70'	Stadium: De Hoge Bomen

2003-09-23	Sparta	2–1	De Graafschap	Rotterdam
	Mendes da Silva 2'; Bechan 54'		Ten Heuvel 74'	Stadium: Het Kasteel

2003-10-28	SBV Excelsior	1–2	Sparta	Rotterdam
	Breuer 88' (pen.)		Van den Bergh 25'; Nascimento 80'	Stadium: Woudestein

2003-12-16	Sparta	2–0	RBC Roosendaal	Rotterdam
	Levchenko 11'; Bechan 65'			Stadium: Het Kasteel

2004-02-03	Sparta	0–0 [aet] 3–2 [pen]	NEC Nijmegen	Rotterdam
	De Fauw (penalty missed); Levchenko (penalty scored); Van den Bergh (penalty scored); Schenkel (penalty scored)		(penalty scored) Schuurman; (penalty scored) Simr; (penalty missed) De Freitas; (penalty scored) Heije; (penalty missed) Wielaert	Stadium: Het Kasteel

2004-03-16	Sparta	3–3 [aet] 3–4 [pen]	FC Utrecht	Rotterdam
	Koevermans 61', 64'; Van den Bergh 97' Levchenko (penalty missed); De Fauw (penalty scored); Mendes da Silva (penalty scored); De Nooijer (penalty scored); Van den Bergh (penalty missed); Van Bueren (penalty missed)		De Groot 10'; Van den Bergh 78'; Broerse 104' (penalty scored) Zuidam; (penalty missed) Broerse; (penalty missed) Van den Bergh; (penalty scored) Kruys; (penalty scored) Van de Haar; (penalty scored) Calabro	Stadium: Het Kasteel

== Players ==
No.	Pos	Nat	Player	Total		Eerste Divisie		Nacompetitie		Amstel Cup	
No.	Pos	Nat	Player	Apps	Goals	Apps	Goals	Apps	Goals	Apps	Goals
	GK	(Netherlands) NED	Frank Kooiman	47	0	36	0	6	0	5	0
	GK	(Belgium) BEL	Brian Vandenbussche	1	0	1	0	0	0	0	0
	DF	(Netherlands) NED	Frank Broers	37	5	28	5	5	0	4	0
	DF	(Belgium) BEL	Davy De Fauw	45	6	33	6	6	0	6	0
	DF	(Netherlands) NED	Martin van Leeuwen	15	0	14	0	0	0	1	0
	DF	(Portugal) POR	David Nascimento	43	3	36	2	1	0	6	1
	DF	(Netherlands) NED	Lorenzo Rimkus	39	1	29	1	5	0	5	0
	DF	(Netherlands) NED	Danny Schenkel	41	5	30	5	6	0	5	0
	DF	(Netherlands) NED	Jayson Trommel	3	0	3	0	0	0	0	0
	DF	(Netherlands) NED	Menno Willems	20	1	11	0	6	1	3	0
	MF	(Netherlands) NED	Kiran Bechan	44	10	32	6	6	1	6	3
	MF	(Netherlands) NED	Ricky van den Bergh	42	22	31	17	5	3	6	2
	MF	(Netherlands) NED	Elbekay Bouchiba	7	0	6	0	0	0	1	0
	MF	(Netherlands) NED	Edwin van Bueren	32	0	24	0	3	0	5	0
	MF	(Netherlands) NED	David Mendes da Silva	45	5	36	4	4	0	5	1
	MF	(Netherlands) NED	Iderlindo Moreno Freire	1	0	1	0	0	0	0	0
	MF	(Ukraine) UKR	Evgeniy Levchenko	45	11	34	8	5	1	6	2
	MF	(Netherlands) NED	Sebastiaan Pot	4	0	2	0	2	0	0	0
	FW	(Netherlands) NED	Rachid Bouaouzan	3	0	1	0	2	0	0	0
	FW	(Netherlands Antilles) ANT	Kenneth Cicilia	4	0	3	0	0	0	1	0
	FW	(Netherlands) NED	Dennis de Nooijer	24	2	17	2	5	0	2	0
	FW	(Netherlands) NED	Moussa Kalisse	11	0	10	0	0	0	1	0
	FW	(Netherlands) NED	Danny Koevermans	30	21	20	15	6	2	4	4
	FW	(Netherlands) NED	Riga Mustapha	41	4	32	4	6	0	3	0
	FW	(Netherlands) NED	Michael Renfurm	15	0	12	0	0	0	3	0

== See also ==
- 2003–04 in Dutch football
