= 2004–05 Sparta Rotterdam season =

Sparta Rotterdam
2004–2005 season
- Manager: Mike Snoei; Adri van Tiggelen
- Eerste Divisie: 2nd place
- KNVB Cup: Second round
- Top goalscorer: League: Danny Koevermans (24); All: Danny Koevermans (30)

The 2004–2005 Sparta Rotterdam season saw the club play in the Dutch Second League for a third year running.

== Matches ==
Win Tie Loss

=== Eerste Divisie ===
13 August 2004	Helmond Sport	2–2	Sparta	Helmond
	Van Dijk 8'; Stinga 74'		Koevermans 1'; Van den Bergh 48'	Stadium: De Braak

27 August 2004	SBV Excelsior	2–3	Sparta	Rotterdam
	El Hamdaoui 51'; Kolk 65'		Koevermans 15'; Mustapha 24', 73'	Stadium: Stadion Woudestein

3 September 2004	Sparta	0–0	FC Emmen	Rotterdam
				Stadium: Het Kasteel

10 September 2004	HFC Haarlem	1–2	Sparta	Haarlem
	Schenkel 19' (o.g.)		Koevermans 47' (pen.); Schenkel 68'	Stadium: Haarlem Stadion

19 September 2004	Sparta	1–2	FC Volendam	Rotterdam
	Wijker 26' (o.g.)		Smit 40'; Kwakman 67'	Stadium: Het Kasteel

24 September 2004	MVV Maastricht	1–1	Sparta	Maastricht
	Bryssinck 79'		Koevermans 64'	Stadium: De Geusselt

1 October 2004	Sparta	1–1	FC Zwolle	Rotterdam
				Stadium: Het Kasteel

8 October 2004	TOP Oss	1–2	Sparta	Oss
				Stadium: TOP Oss Stadion

15 October 2004	Sparta	4–1	Cambuur Leeuwarden	Rotterdam
				Stadium: Het Kasteel

24 October 2004	Sparta	3–5	FC Dordrecht	Rotterdam
				Stadium: Het Kasteel

29 October 2004	BV Veendam	0–3	Sparta	Veendam
				Stadium: De Langeleegte

5 November 2004	FC Eindhoven	1–7	Sparta	Eindhoven
				Stadium: Jan Louwers Stadion

12 November 2004	Sparta	3–0	VVV-Venlo	Rotterdam
				Stadium: Het Kasteel

19 November 2004	Sparta	3–0	Telstar	Rotterdam
				Stadium: Het Kasteel

26 November 2004	AGOVV Apeldoorn	1–1	Sparta	Apeldoorn
				Stadium: Berg & Bos

3 December 2004	Sparta	4–3	Fortuna Sittard	Rotterdam
				Stadium: Het Kasteel

10 December 2004	Heracles Almelo	0–4	Sparta	Almelo
				Stadium: Polman Stadion

17 December 2004	Sparta	2–2	Go Ahead Eagles	Rotterdam
				Stadium: Het Kasteel

28 January 2005	Sparta	3–1	Helmond Sport	Rotterdam
				Stadium: Het Kasteel

13 February 2005	Sparta	1–1	SBV Excelsior	Rotterdam
				Stadium: Het Kasteel

18 February 2005	FC Emmen	0–5	Sparta	Emmen
				Stadium: Univé Stadion

25 February 2005	Sparta	5–0	TOP Oss	Rotterdam
				Stadium: Het Kasteel

4 March 2005	Cambuur Leeuwarden	0–1	Sparta	Leeuwarden
				Stadium: Cambuur Stadion

11 March 2005	Sparta	6–1	HFC Haarlem	Rotterdam
				Stadium: Het Kasteel

14 March 2005	FC Volendam	1–4	Sparta	Volendam
				Stadium: Kras Stadion

18 March 2005	Sparta	1–1	MVV Maastricht	Rotterdam
				Stadium: Het Kasteel

25 March 2005	FC Zwolle	0–1	Sparta	Zwolle
				Stadium: Oosterenkstadion

1 April 2005	Sparta	5–1	FC Eindhoven	Rotterdam
				Stadium: Het Kasteel

8 April 2005	VVV-Venlo	1–0	Sparta	Venlo
				Stadium: De Koel

11 April 2005	Telstar	3–3	Sparta	Velsen
				Stadium: Schoonenberg Stadion

15 April 2005	Sparta	3–1	AGOVV Apeldoorn	Rotterdam
				Stadium: Het Kasteel

22 April 2005	FC Dordrecht	0–4	Sparta	Dordrecht
				Stadium: GN Bouw Stadion

29 April 2005	Sparta	0–0	BV Veendam	Rotterdam
				Stadium: Het Kasteel

6 May 2005	Fortuna Sittard	3–0	Sparta	Sittard
				Stadium: Wagner & Partners

13 May 2005	Sparta	0–0	Heracles Almelo	Rotterdam
				Stadium: Het Kasteel

20 May 2005	Go Ahead Eagles	2–5	Sparta	Deventer
				Stadium: Adelaarshorst

=== Nacompetitie ===
25 May 2005	Sparta	0–1	Helmond Sport	Rotterdam
			Cvetkov 72'	Stadium: Het Kasteel

28 May 2005	FC Zwolle	1–4	Sparta	Zwolle
	Hooiveld 35'		Koevermans 8', 55'; Mustapha 71', 88'	Stadium: Oosterenkstadion

31 May 2005	De Graafschap	1–3	Sparta	Doetinchem
	Bot 78'		De Fauw 18'; Mustapha 29'; Koevermans 90'	Stadium: De Vijverberg

3 June 2005	Sparta	1–0	De Graafschap	Rotterdam
	Kinet 14'			Stadium: Het Kasteel

6 June 2005	Sparta	3–1	FC Zwolle	Rotterdam
	Van den Bergh 50', 72', 86'		Esajas 36'	Stadium: Het Kasteel

9 June 2005	Helmond Sport	1–2	Sparta	Helmond
	Wau 59'		Mustapha 73'; Bouaouzan 90'	Stadium: Stadion De Braak

=== Amstel Cup ===
7 August 2004	Sparta	7–0	TOP	Rotterdam
	Levchenko 2', 34'; Koevermans 20', 77', 83'; Van den Bergh 34'; Schenkel 86'			Stadium: Het Kasteel

23 September 2003	Willem II	2–0	Sparta	Tilburg
	Reuser 71'; Quinn 73'			Stadium: Willem II Stadion

== Players ==
No.	Pos	Nat	Player	Total		Eerste Divisie		Nacompetitie		Amstel Cup	
No.	Pos	Nat	Player	Apps	Goals	Apps	Goals	Apps	Goals	Apps	Goals
	GK	(Netherlands) NED	Frank Kooiman	44	0	36	0	6	0	2	0
	DF	(Netherlands) NED	Marco de Borst	2	0	2	0	0	0	0	0
	DF	(Netherlands) NED	Frank Broers	39	2	31	2	6	0	2	0
	DF	(Netherlands) NED	Marciano Bruma	28	1	23	1	3	0	2	0
	DF	(Belgium) BEL	Davy De Fauw	43	5	35	4	6	1	2	0
	DF	(Netherlands) NED	Wouter Gudde	28	0	24	0	4	0	0	0
	DF	(Netherlands) NED	Ramon van Haaren	21	0	17	0	4	0	0	0
	DF	(Portugal) POR	David Nascimento	2	0	1	0	0	0	1	0
	DF	(Netherlands) NED	Lorenzo Rimkus	20	0	14	0	5	0	1	0
	DF	(Netherlands) NED	Danny Schenkel	40	6	32	5	6	0	2	1
	DF	(Netherlands) NED	Menno Willems	28	0	21	0	5	0	2	0
	MF	(Netherlands) NED	Ricky van den Bergh	36	26	32	22	3	3	1	1
	MF	(Netherlands) NED	Edwin van Bueren	31	0	24	0	6	0	1	0
	MF	(Netherlands) NED	Roel de Graaff	6	0	5	0	0	0	1	0
	MF	(Belgium) BEL	Christophe Kinet	14	2	12	1	2	1	0	0
	MF	(Ukraine) UKR	Evgeniy Levchenko	42	5	35	3	5	0	2	2
	MF	(Netherlands) NED	Jan Michels	34	1	29	1	3	0	2	0
	MF	(Netherlands) NED	Sebastiaan Pot	0	0	0	0	0	0	0	0
	FW	(Netherlands) NED	Rachid Bouaouzan	17	2	10	1	6	1	1	0
	FW	(Portugal) POR	Bruno Corte Real	1	0	1	0	0	0	0	0
	FW	(Netherlands) NED	Moussa Kalisse	32	6	30	6	1	0	1	0
	FW	(Netherlands) NED	Danny Koevermans	37	30	29	24	6	3	2	3
	FW	(Netherlands) NED	Riga Mustapha	44	26	36	22	6	4	2	0
	FW	(Netherlands) NED	Kerem Yilmaz	2	0	1	0	0	0	1	0

== See also ==
- 2004–05 in Dutch football
