= 2005–06 Sparta Rotterdam season =

Sparta Rotterdam
2005–2006 season
- Manager: (Netherlands) Wiljan Vloet
- Eredivisie: 14th place
- KNVB Cup: Second round
- Top goalscorer: League: (Netherlands) Jason Oost (8); All: (Netherlands) Jason Oost (11)

The 2005–2006 season saw Sparta Rotterdam returning in the Eredivisie, after the association football club from Rotterdam competed for three years in the Eerste Divisie. The team gained promotion in the previous season by winning the play-offs for promotion and relegation ("nacompetitie").

== Matches ==
Win Tie Loss

=== Eredivisie ===
2005-08-12	AZ Alkmaar	3–0	Sparta	Alkmaar
				Stadium: Alkmaarderhout

2005-08-21	Sparta	1–3	Feyenoord	Rotterdam
				Stadium: Het Kasteel

2005-08-27	Sparta	1–0	NAC Breda	Rotterdam
				Stadium: Het Kasteel

2005-09-11	FC Groningen	1–0	Sparta	Groningen
				Stadium: Oosterpark

2005-09-17	RBC Roosendaal	1–1	Sparta	Roosendaal
				Stadium: RBC Stadion

2005-09-25	Sparta	2–0	Heracles Almelo	Rotterdam
				Stadium: Het Kasteel

2005-10-02	Sparta	1–2	Ajax	Rotterdam
				Stadium: Het Kasteel

2005-10-14	Willem II	0–0	Sparta	Tilburg
				Stadium: Willem II Stadion

2005-10-22	Sparta	2–3	Roda JC	Rotterdam
				Stadium: Het Kasteel

2005-10-30	NEC Nijmegen	0–0	Sparta	Nijmegen
				Stadium: De Goffert

2005-11-05	PSV	3–0	Sparta	Eindhoven
				Stadium: Philips Stadion

2005-11-20	Sparta	1–2	SC Heerenveen	Rotterdam
				Stadium: Het Kasteel

2005-11-30	FC Twente	1–0	Sparta	Enschede
				Stadium: Diekman Stadion

2005-12-04	Sparta	2–3	ADO Den Haag	Rotterdam
				Stadium: Het Kasteel

2005-12-11	RKC Waalwijk	3–2	Sparta	Waalwijk
				Stadium: Mandemakers Stadion

2005-12-16	Sparta	1–0	Vitesse	Rotterdam
				Stadium: Het Kasteel

2005-12-26	FC Utrecht	1–1	Sparta	Utrecht
				Stadium: Galgenwaard

2006-01-15	Sparta	0–1	PSV	Rotterdam
				Stadium: Het Kasteel

2006-01-18	Sparta	1–3	NEC Nijmegen	Rotterdam
				Stadium: Het Kasteel

2006-01-21	SC Heerenveen	0–0	Sparta	Heerenveen
				Stadium: Abe Lenstra Stadion

2006-01-28	Sparta	1–0	FC Twente	Rotterdam
				Stadium: Het Kasteel

2006-02-04	NAC Breda	0–0	Sparta	Breda
				Stadium: Rat Verlegh Stadion

2006-02-07	Sparta	1–0	FC Groningen	Rotterdam
				Stadium: Het Kasteel

2006-02-10	Sparta	0–1	AZ Alkmaar	Rotterdam
				Stadium: Het Kasteel

2006-02-19	Feyenoord	4–0	Sparta	Rotterdam
				Stadium: De Kuip

2006-02-25	Sparta	3–2	Willem II	Rotterdam
				Stadium: Het Kasteel

2006-03-05	Ajax	6–0	Sparta	Amsterdam
				Stadium: Amsterdam Arena

2006-03-11	Roda JC	1–1	Sparta	Kerkrade
				Stadium: Parkstad Limburg Stadion

2006-03-19	Sparta	0–1	FC Utrecht	Rotterdam
				Stadium: Het Kasteel

2006-03-24	Vitesse	3–1	Sparta	Arnhem
				Stadium: Gelredome

2006-04-01	Heracles Almelo	1–0	Sparta	Almelo
				Stadium: Polman Stadion

2006-04-08	Sparta	5–0	RBC Roosendaal	Rotterdam
				Stadium: Het Kasteel

2006-04-12	Sparta	3–2	RKC Waalwijk	Rotterdam
				Stadium: Het Kasteel

2006-04-16	ADO Den Haag	0–2	Sparta	The Hague
				Stadium: Zuiderpark

=== Amstel Cup ===
2005-08-09	RKSV Schijndel	0–5	Sparta	Schijndel
			Van den Bergh 20', 40'; Oost 54', 56' (pen.), 80' (pen.)	Attendance: 1,300; Referee: Koopman

2005-09-21	FC Groningen	2–1	Sparta	Groningen
	Cornelisse 12'; Florén 50'		Rose 88'	Stadium: Oosterpark Stadion; Attendance: 6,000; Referee: Van Hulten

== Players ==
No.	Pos	Nat	Player	Total		Eredivisie		Amstel Cup	
No.	Pos	Nat	Player	Apps	Goals	Apps	Goals	Apps	Goals
	GK	(Netherlands) NED	Frank Kooiman	0	0	0	0	0	0
	GK	(Netherlands) NED	René Ponk	36	0	34	0	2	0
	DF	(Netherlands) NED	Marciano Bruma	6	0	5	0	1	0
	DF	(Belgium) BEL	Davy De Fauw	34	3	32	3	2	0
	DF	(Netherlands) NED	Wouter Gudde	26	1	26	1	0	0
	DF	(Bosnia and Herzegovina) BIH	Nebojša Gudelj	33	1	31	1	2	0
	DF	(Netherlands) NED	Steve Olfers	21	0	19	0	2	0
	DF	(Netherlands) NED	Sebastiaan Pot	0	0	0	0	0	0
	DF	(Netherlands) NED	Nathan Rutjes	1	0	1	0	0	0
	DF	(Netherlands) NED	Danny Schenkel	16	0	16	0	0	0
	DF	(Netherlands) NED	Kerem Yilmaz	3	0	3	0	0	0
	DF	(Netherlands) NED	Tom Zoontjes	18	0	16	0	2	0
	MF	(Netherlands) NED	Marco de Borst	0	0	0	0	0	0
	MF	(Netherlands) NED	Edwin van Bueren	20	0	18	0	2	0
	MF	(Netherlands) NED	Roel de Graaff	0	0	0	0	0	0
	MF	(Nigeria) NGA	Sani Kaita	10	0	10	0	0	0
	MF	(Netherlands) NED	Menno Kans	0	0	0	0	0	0
	MF	(Belgium) BEL	Christophe Kinet	3	0	2	0	1	0
	MF	(Netherlands) NED	Jan Michels	22	0	21	0	1	0
	MF	(Ghana) GHA	Anthony Obodai	28	1	28	1	0	0
	MF	(Netherlands) NED	Sjaak Polak	30	2	28	2	2	0
	FW	(Netherlands) NED	Istvan Bakx	8	1	2	0	6	1
	FW	(Netherlands) NED	Ricky van den Bergh	25	8	23	6	2	2
	FW	(Netherlands) NED	Rachid Bouaouzan	32	1	30	1	2	0
	FW	(Bulgaria) BUL	Ivan Cvetkov	29	5	27	5	2	0
	FW	(Netherlands) NED	Marvin Emnes	10	1	10	1	0	0
	FW	(Netherlands) NED	Jason Oost	32	11	30	8	2	3
	FW	(Netherlands) NED	Yuri Rose	34	6	32	5	2	1
	FW	(Belgium) BEL	Dieter Van Tornhout	13	1	13	1	0	0
	FW	(Netherlands) NED	Marvin Wijks	1	0	1	0	0	0

== See also ==
- 2005–06 in Dutch football
