= 2004–05 Eerste Divisie =

49th season of the second-tier football league in Netherlands

Eerste Divisie
- Season: 2004–05
- Champions: Heracles Almelo
- Promoted: Heracles Almelo; Sparta Rotterdam

The 2004–05 season of the Eerste Divisie began in August 2004 and ended in April 2005. The title was won by Heracles Almelo.

== Promoted teams ==
The following teams were promoted to the Eredivisie at the end of the season:

- Heracles Almelo (champion)
- Sparta Rotterdam (promoted through playoffs)

== New teams ==
These teams were relegated from the Eredivisie at the start of the season:

- FC Volendam (17th position, relegated through playoffs)
- FC Zwolle (18th position)

== League standings ==
Pos	Team	Pld	W	D	L	GF	GA	GD	Pts	Promotion or qualification
1	Heracles Almelo	36	23	6	7	67	34	+33	75	Champion, promoted to the Eredivisie
2	Sparta Rotterdam	36	21	11	4	93	39	+54	74	Promoted to the Eredivisie following play-offs
3	VVV-Venlo	36	18	8	10	56	36	+20	62	Qualified for the play-offs
4	FC Zwolle	36	17	10	9	66	50	+16	61	Qualified for the play-offs
5	FC Volendam	36	18	7	11	52	38	+14	61	Qualified for the play-offs
6	Helmond Sport	36	16	9	11	61	44	+17	57	Qualified for the play-offs
7	Stormvogels Telstar	36	15	11	10	58	46	+12	56	Qualified for the play-offs
8	FC Dordrecht	36	15	8	13	46	51	−5	53	
9	Cambuur Leeuwarden	36	13	8	15	44	54	−10	47	
10	AGOVV Apeldoorn	36	15	1	20	55	60	−5	46	
11	BV Veendam	36	11	12	13	47	56	−9	45	
12	Excelsior Rotterdam	36	12	8	16	56	59	−3	44	
13	HFC Haarlem	36	11	9	16	47	56	−9	42	
14	MVV	36	9	12	15	40	46	−6	39	
15	FC Eindhoven	36	10	9	17	60	80	−20	39	
16	TOP Oss	36	10	9	17	41	66	−25	39	
17	Go Ahead Eagles	36	9	11	16	40	60	−20	35 (Note: Deducted 3 points for financial mismanagement)	
18	FC Emmen	36	7	9	20	38	71	−33	30	
19	Fortuna Sittard	36	8	10	18	46	67	−21	28 (Note: Deducted 6 points for financial mismanagement)	

Source: rsssf.com

== Playoff standings ==
Group A
Pos	Team	Pld	W	D	L	GF	GA	GD	Pts	Promotion
1	RBC Roosendaal	6	3	2	1	9	3	+6	11	Promoted to the Eredivisie
2	FC Volendam	6	2	3	1	11	9	+2	9	
3	Stormvogels Telstar	6	2	2	2	9	10	−1	8	
4	VVV-Venlo	6	1	1	4	6	13	−7	4	

Group B
Pos	Team	Pld	W	D	L	GF	GA	GD	Pts	Promotion
1	Sparta Rotterdam	6	5	0	1	13	5	+8	15	Promoted to the Eredivisie
2	Helmond Sport	6	2	3	1	11	6	+5	9	
3	De Graafschap	6	2	2	2	11	10	+1	8	
4	FC Zwolle	6	0	1	5	6	20	−14	1	

== Top scorers ==
Goals	Player	Team
24	(Netherlands) Danny Koevermans	Sparta Rotterdam
22	(Netherlands) Ricky van den Bergh	Sparta Rotterdam
22	(Netherlands) Riga Mustapha	Sparta Rotterdam
19	(Bulgaria) Ivan Cvetkov	Helmond Sport
18	(Netherlands) Dirk Jan Derksen	Fortuna Sittard
16	(Netherlands) Ronald Hamming	BV Veendam
15	(Netherlands) Bernard Hofstede	VVV-Venlo
15	(Netherlands Antilles) Leon Kantelberg	Stormvogels Telstar
13	(Netherlands) Ruud Berger	FC Zwolle
13	(Netherlands) Santinho Lopes Monteiro	AGOVV Apeldoorn
13	(Netherlands) Ibad Muhamadu	MVV
13	(Netherlands) Gert-Jan Tamerus	Heracles Almelo

== Attendances ==
#	Club	Average
1	Sparta	5,751
2	Heracles	5,709
3	VVV	4,540
4	Cambuur	4,149
5	MVV	3,937
6	Zwolle	3,849
7	Emmen	3,721
8	Fortuna	3,340
9	Veendam	2,944
10	Helmond	2,923
11	Volendam	2,824
12	Go Ahead	2,743
13	AGOVV	1,965
14	Haarlem	1,934
15	Dordrecht	1,919
16	Eindhoven	1,624
17	Excelsior	1,568
18	Telstar	1,548
19	Oss	1,544

== See also ==
- 2004–05 Eredivisie
- 2004–05 KNVB Cup
- 2004–05 Sparta Rotterdam season
