= Iderlindo Moreno Freire =

Dutch footballer (born 1985)

Personal information
- Date of birth: 13 February 1985 (age 41)
- Place of birth: Rotterdam, Netherlands
- Height: 1.78 m (5 ft 10 in)
- Position: Defensive midfielder

Youth career
- Neptunus
- Sparta Rotterdam

Senior career*
Years	Team	Apps	(Gls)
2003–2009	Sparta Rotterdam	30	(2)
2009	Penafiel	3	(0)
2010	Dordrecht	5	(0)
2011	RBC Roosendaal	4	(0)
2012–2013	Kozakken Boys	1	(0)
2013	Santa Clara	1	(0)
Total		44	(2)

International career
2003	Netherlands U18	1	(0)
- * Club domestic league appearances and goals

Iderlindo Moreno Freire (born 13 February 1985) is a Dutch former professional footballer who played as a defensive midfielder.

== Club career ==
Moreno Freire came through the youth system of Sparta Rotterdam, having begun his career at local side Neptunus in Rotterdam before joining Sparta as an under-13 player. With Sparta's under-15s he won a league title and earned selection for the Netherlands under-18 and under-19 national teams.

He made his professional first-team debut for Sparta on 26 March 2004 in a home match against AGOVV in the Eerste Divisie, replacing Edwin van Bueren in the 77th minute. He was told that he could leave as a free agent in March 2005, but eventually stayed on an amateur contract. He did not feature again for the senior side until the 2006–07 campaign in the Eredivisie, but after the winter break of that season he established himself in the team and earned a contract extension through 1 July 2009.

In the 2007–08 season, Moreno Freire became a regular starter as a defensive midfielder under head coach Foeke Booy. He later lost his place in the squad, and Sparta chose not to renew his expiring contract.

In August 2009, he signed for Portuguese club Penafiel. His opportunities there were limited during a period marked by the club's relegation and financial difficulties, and he returned to the Netherlands in the winter break to join Dordrecht. In the summer of 2010 he moved to RBC Roosendaal, where he remained until the conclusion of the 2011–12 season. During his spell at RBC he suffered a fractured leg; the recovery was prolonged due to an initially undiagnosed fluid build-up in the bone, but he returned to full fitness late in 2012.

After leaving RBC, and unable to secure another professional contract, Moreno Freire joined Kozakken Boys of the then-third-tier Topklasse for the 2012–13 season. His final club was Portuguese side Santa Clara, where he had a brief spell in early 2013.

== International career ==
Moreno Freire made one appearance for the Netherlands under-18 side, starting in a 3–0 friendly win against Belgium U18 in Valkenswaard on 16 April 2003.

== Personal life ==
Moreno Freire is of Cape Verdean descent. He is a cousin of former professional footballer David Mendes da Silva.

== Career statistics ==
Appearances and goals by club, season and competition
Club	Season	League			National cup (Note: Includes KNVB Cup)		League cup (Note: Includes Taça da Liga)		Total	
Club	Season	Division	Apps	Goals	Apps	Goals	Apps	Goals	Apps	Goals
Sparta Rotterdam	2003–04	Eerste Divisie	1	0	0	0	—		1	0
Sparta Rotterdam	2004–05	Eerste Divisie	0	0	0	0	—		0	0
Sparta Rotterdam	2005–06	Eredivisie	0	0	0	0	—		0	0
Sparta Rotterdam	2006–07	Eredivisie	14	2	0	0	—		14	2
Sparta Rotterdam	2007–08	Eredivisie	12	0	0	0	—		12	0
Sparta Rotterdam	2008–09	Eredivisie	3	0	0	0	—		3	0
Sparta Rotterdam	Total		30	2	0	0	0	0	30	2
Penafiel	2009–10	Liga de Honra	3	0	0	0	1	0	4	0
Dordrecht	2009–10	Eerste Divisie	5	0	0	0	—		5	0
RBC Roosendaal	2010–11	Eerste Divisie	4	0	0	0	—		4	0
Kozakken Boys	2012–13	Saturday Topklasse	1	0	1	0	—		2	0
Santa Clara	2012–13	Segunda Liga	1	0	0	0	0	0	1	0
Career total			44	2	1	0	1	0	46	2
