= 2004–05 in Dutch football =

The 2004-05 season in Dutch football saw PSV winning the double under the guidance of manager Guus Hiddink. Since PSV won the title in the Eredivisie, the losing KNVB Cup finalist, Willem II, earned the right to play in the UEFA Cup.

== Johan Cruijff-schaal ==
August 8, 2004

Ajax	2–4	Utrecht
Pienaar 51'; Sneijder 81'		Schut 72'; Somers 87', 90'; Douglas 90+1'

Amsterdam Arena, Amsterdam
Attendance: 33,500
Referee: Dick van Egmond

== Eredivisie ==
See Eredivisie 2004-05

=== Awards ===
==== Dutch Footballer of the Year ====
- 2004–05 — Mark van Bommel (PSV)

==== Dutch Golden Shoe Winner ====
- 2004 — Maxwell (Ajax)
- 2005 — Mark van Bommel (PSV)

== Eerste Divisie ==
See Eerste Divisie 2004–05

== KNVB Cup ==
Quarter-finals
March 2
Willem II	3
FC Den Bosch	0
March 2
ADO Den Haag	0
Ajax	2
March 3
Feyenoord	4
NAC Breda	0
March 3
PSV	6
TOP Oss	1

Semi-finals
April 21
Willem II	1
Ajax	0
April 20
Feyenoord	1 (2)
PSV	1 (4)

Final
May 29 – Rotterdam
PSV	4
Willem II	0

== See also ==
- Sparta Rotterdam season 2004–05
