= Laurent Castellana =

Belgian footballer (born 1987)

Personal information
- Full name: Laurent Castellana
- Date of birth: 17 January 1987 (age 39)
- Place of birth: Liège, Belgium
- Height: 1.85 m (6 ft 1 in)
- Position: Centre-back

Team information
- Current team: RUFC Ransartoise

Youth career
- Standard Liège

Senior career*
Years	Team	Apps	(Gls)
2005–2012	MVV	162	(2)
2013	Etar 1924	10	(1)
2013–2014	Charleroi Fleurus	30	(2)
2014–2019	Châtelet	49+	(2+)
2019–2021	Olympic Charleroi	24	(0)
2021–	RUFC Ransartoise		
- * Club domestic league appearances and goals

Laurent Castellana (born 17 January 1987) is a Belgian footballer who plays as a centre-back for RUFC Ransartoise.

== Career ==
Castellana began his career in the youth system of Standard Liège. In 2005, he signed his first professional contract with Dutch second‐tier club MVV Maastricht in the Eerste Divisie. He made his professional league debut on 23 September 2005 in a 2–0 home win over VVV-Venlo, coming on as an 87th‐minute substitute for Tom van Bergen.

After seven years with MVV, Castellana joined Bulgarian club Etar 1924 in January 2013. He scored his first goal for the club on 10 April, opening the scoring in a 6–1 defeat against Litex in an A PFG match. He left the club at the end of the season.

In July 2013, Castellana returned to Belgium, signing for Charleroi Fleurus. A season later, he moved to Châtelet, where he played for five years.

Ahead of the 2019–20 season, Castellana joined Olympic Charleroi. In June 2019, he moved to RUFC Ransartoise.
