= Marvin Emnes =

Dutch footballer (born 1988)

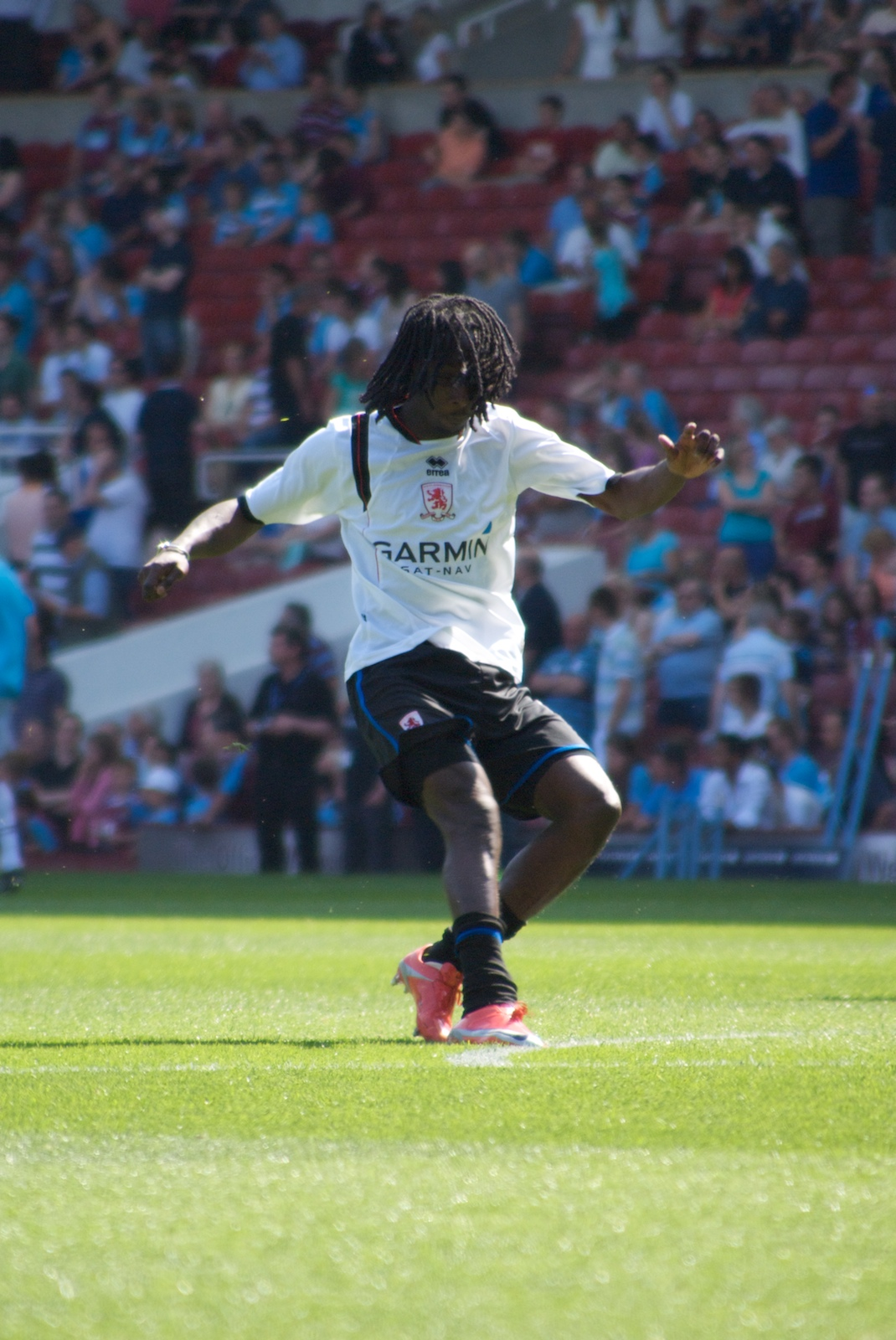
- Emnes playing for Middlesbrough in 2009

Personal information
- Full name: Marvin Renato Emnes
- Date of birth: 27 May 1988 (age 38)
- Place of birth: Rotterdam, Netherlands
- Height: 5 ft 11 in (1.80 m)
- Positions: Striker; winger

Youth career
- 1997–2005: Sparta Rotterdam

Senior career*
Years	Team	Apps	(Gls)
2005–2008	Sparta Rotterdam	55	(9)
2008–2014	Middlesbrough	141	(24)
2010	→ Swansea City (loan)	4	(2)
2014	→ Swansea City (loan)	7	(1)
2014–2017	Swansea City	19	(0)
2016–2017	→ Blackburn Rovers (loan)	19	(3)
2017	→ Blackburn Rovers (loan)	16	(1)
2017–2018	Akhisarspor	7	(0)
2018	Vancouver Whitecaps	0	(0)
2021	Ravenna	3	(0)

International career
2003	Netherlands U16	1	(0)
2005	Netherlands U17	14	(4)
2006–2007	Netherlands U19	7	(1)
2008–2009	Netherlands U20	2	(2)
2008–2009	Netherlands U21	3	(0)
- * Club domestic league appearances and goals as of 15 May 2021

Marvin Renato Emnes (born 27 May 1988) is a Dutch professional footballer who plays as a striker or winger.

== Early life ==
Born in Rotterdam, Emnes was a sprinter as a youth. Emnes played football for amateur side Xerxes before he joined the Sparta youth academy in 1997. In October 2004, Emnes signed his first professional contract with the club.

== Club career ==
=== Sparta Rotterdam ===
Emnes made his debut for Sparta Rotterdam in the 2005–06 season, which came on 11 December 2005, coming on as a late substitute, in a 3–2 loss against RKC Waalwijk. Amid to the first team, he helped Jong Sparta Rotterdam win the reserve first division B after beating Jong FC Dordrecht. Emnes scored his first goal for the club, in a 5–0 win against RBC Roosendaal on 8 April 2006. At the end of the 2005–06 season, he made ten appearances and scoring once in all competitions.

At the start of the 2006–07 season, Emnes soon received more playing time at Sparta Rotterdam, mostly coming from the substitute bench. However, during a match against Willem II on 29 October 2006, he suffered ankle injury that kept him out for two months. It was not until on 15 December 2006, Emnes returned to the starting line–up, starting a match and played 45 minutes before being substituted at half time, in a 3–0 loss against NAC Breda. Following his return from injury, he spent the rest of the season in and out of the first team, as well as, playing for Jong Sparta Rotterdam. At the end of the 2006–07 season, Emnes made sixteen appearances in all competitions.

At the start of the 2007–08 season, Emnes' playing time continued mostly coming from the substitute bench, but soon started in a number of matches. It was not until on 15 February 2008 when Emnes scored his first goal of the season, in a 6–2 loss against AFC Ajax. This was followed up by scoring against FC Utrecht. Emnes then scored twice in two consecutive matches against Roda JC and NEC Nijmegen, which was then followed up by scoring against Feyenoord. His goal against Feynoord would later earn him a cult status among Sparta Rotterdam's supporters. He later scored his eighth goal of the season against SC Heerenveen on 13 April 2008, resulting 4–2 win against Sparta Rotterdam and helping the side avoid relegation. For his performance as a result of scoring eight goals in twenty–nine appearances in all competitions, Emnes was declared Sparta Fans' Player of the Year.

Following this, Emnes was linked a move away from Sparta Rotterdam, with top Netherlands clubs, such as, Feyenoord, AFC Ajax and SC Heerenveen were interested in signing him. It came after when he intended not to renew his contract with the club.

=== Middlesbrough ===
On 4 July 2008, Emnes signed a four-year contract with then-Premier League team Middlesbrough for a transfer fee of €4 million (£3.2 million). Upon joining the club, Manager Gareth Southgate said: "He can play anywhere along the front line, so he has versatility to go with pace, energy and technical skills."

His début came in the League Cup against Yeovil Town on 27 August, getting on the score sheet in the process. It was not until on 25 October 2008 when Emnes made his league debut for the club, coming on as a late substitute, in a 1–1 draw against Blackburn Rovers. However, his first team opportunities at the club became limited, due to strong competitions in the forward position and as a result, Emnes had his playing time restricted, mostly coming on from the substitute bench. On 24 January 2009, he scored the winning goal for Middlesbrough in the 83rd minute against Wolverhampton Wanderers in the FA Cup, with the score finishing 2–1. He made his first Premier League start on 11 May as part of a 3–1 away defeat to Newcastle United. His next start with Middlesbrough was against Aston Villa, in which he produced a man of the match performance. He was also given the "Player of the Weekend" award after two successful starts. The last game of the season against West Ham United, however, saw them lose 2–1, resulting in their relegation to the Championship in eleven years.

Ahead of the 2009–10 season, Emnes was expected to earn a starting place in the first team by both the club's manager Gareth Southgate and assistant manager Steve Agnew. He made his first appearance of the season, starting a match before being substituted after playing 65 minutes, in a 0–0 draw against Sheffield United in the opening game of the season. He scored his first league goal for Middlesbrough in a match against Swansea City on 15 August 2009. Since the start of the 2009–10 season, Emnes became a first team regular, forming a striking partnership with Leroy Lita. He played a role when he set up two goals in a 3–1 win against Ipswich Town on 12 September 2009, followed up by setting up another goal, in a 3–1 win against Sheffield Wednesday. However, Emnes soon found himself placed on the substitute bench once again and his playing time restricted, mostly coming on from the substitute bench, as well as, his own injury concern.

Following the end of the 2009–10 season, Emnes went on trial with German club Fortuna Düsseldorf. Emnes did not sign for Düsseldorf, but he instead mainly sat on the bench throughout Gordon Strachan's reign in charge. After his loan spell at Swansea City came to an end, Emnes made his first Middlesbrough's appearance of the season, coming on as a 59th-minute substitute, in a 1–0 loss against Millwall on 20 November 2010. He regained his first team place under the management of Tony Mowbray and continued his partnership with Leroy Lita and Scott McDonald. Emnes assisted three goals in three matches between 11 December 2010 and 28 December 2010 against Cardiff City, Doncaster Rovers and Preston North End. It was not until on 12 February 2011 when he scored his first goal for Middlesbrough in almost two years, in a 4–2 loss against Swansea City. Between the date from 5 February 2011 and 19 February 2011, Emnes was sidelined on two occasions. Emnes scored two goals in two matches between 2 April 2011 and 9 April 2011 against Leicester City and Sheffield United. However, his violent conduct against Sheffield United, which he did not get sent–off by the referee, resulted in him serving a three match suspension. After serving a three match suspension, Emnes returned to the starting line–up against Hull City on 23 April 2011 and set up two goals for Scott McDonald, who scored a hat–trick, in a 4–2 win,

Ahead of the 2011–12 season, Emnes and strike partner Leroy Lita were linked with a transfer to Swansea City for a combined fee of £4 million, a move which Lita made. At the start of the previous season, Emnes had not been assigned a squad number by former manager Gordon Strachan but much improved displays under Mowbray were rewarded when in August 2011, Emnes signed a three-year contract extension with Middlesbrough. Shortly after signing a contract extension with the club, he spoke out his target of scoring goals ahead of the new season. Emnes scored in the opening match of the 2011–12 season, in a 2–2 draw with Portsmouth, which followed up three days later by scoring his first hat-trick in English football in Middlesbrough's 3–0 victory over Walsall in the League Cup first round. Four days later, Emnes scored the only goal in a 1–0 victory over Leeds United on 13 August 2011. Emnes scored the third goal in a 3–1 victory over Barnsley on 16 August 2011. He rounded off an impressive first month back as a Middlesbrough first team player, by scoring his team's goal in a 1–1 draw with Coventry on 27 August 2011, which was his seventh goal in seven matches for the 2011/12 season. His start to the 2011–12 season was rewarded with Emnes winning the Championship Player of the Month award for August. Emnes scored the only goal in an away victory at Crystal Palace on 17 September 2011, a win which put Middlesbrough top of the Championship table. He scored against Derby County in a 2–0 win which was his ninth goal of the season and scored his 10th goal in all competitions away against Doncaster Rovers a week later. After suffering an injury, it was not until on 7 January 2012 when his 11th goal of the season came in the FA Cup third round in the 1–0 victory over Shrewsbury. Emnes scored his first goal since November with a goal against Nottingham Forest on 14 February 2012 and then went on to score twice in the match against Millwall, the week after. He later scored three more goals later in the 2011–12 season, adding his tally to eighteen, making him the club's top scorer. Throughout the 2011–12 season, Emnes continued to be in a first team regular for the side, forming a partnership with McDonald and Bartholomew Ogbeche.

Emnes began the 2012–13 season by scoring his team's first goal in a 2–1 victory over Bury in the first round of the League Cup. However, he missed two matches due to a foot injury and rumours, regarding his future at Middlesbrough. It was not until on 28 August 2012 when Emnes returned to the starting line–up and played 59 minutes, in a 2–0 win against Gillingham in the second round of the League Cup. In a follow–up match, he scored his first league goal of the season, in a 3–1 loss against Millwall. After being sidelined on two separate occasions between mid–September and early–October, Emnes scored two goals in two matches between 6 October 2012 and 20 October 2012 against Watford and Brighton & Hove Albion. However, during a 2–1 win against Bolton Wanderers on 29 October 2012, he suffered a hamstring injury in the 22nd minute and was substituted, leading him to be sidelined for a week. It was not until on 9 November 2012 when Emnes returned to the starting line–up, starting a match and played 73 minutes, in a 3–1 win against Sheffield Wednesday. A month later on 15 December 2012 when he scored his first goal in two months, as well as, setting up a goal, in a 2–1 win against Wolverhampton Wanderers. Following this, his goal scoring form soon dropped and found his playing time restricted, mostly coming on from the substitute bench. In addition, Emnes found himself out of the starting line–up. As a result, his performance was criticised by the club's supporters. Despite this, Emnes score his first goal in four months, in a 2–2 draw against Charlton Athletic on 27 April 2013.

At the start of the 2013–14 season, Emnes regained his first team place, appearing in the starting line–up for the side. However, following a 2–1 loss against Accrington Stanley in the first round of the League Cup, he was booed by the club's supporters, which led Manager Tony Mowbray defending him. But he was able to make amends, scoring his first goal of the season, in a 1–1 draw against Blackpool on 17 August 2013. However, in mid–September, Emnes suffered a groin injury. After missing out three matches, he made his return to the starting line–up, setting up the club's third goal of the game, in a 4–1 win against Yeovil Town on 5 October 2013. Following his return, Emnes continued to feature in the first team, mostly coming on as a substitute for the remaining matches for the next three months until his departure.

=== Swansea City ===
Emnes joined Swansea City on a month-long loan on 18 October 2010. On 23 October 2010, Emnes scored his second league goal in English football, finding the net during his Swansea debut against Leicester City after coming on as a half-time substitute for Stephen Dobbie. On 7 November, Emnes scored a second goal for Swansea in the 156th South Wales derby, a strike which turned out to be enough to see off local rivals Cardiff City in a 1–0 win for the Swans. Despite expressing interest in extending his loan spell, Emnes returned to his parent club after the end of month-long loan spell.

Four years later, Emnes returned to Swansea City for another loan spell. On 31 January 2014, he signed on loan for Premier League side Swansea City until the end of the season. Emnes made his first appearance for the club in four years, starting the match before being substituted at half–time, in a 3–0 win against rivals' Cardiff City on 8 February 2014. He then played in both legs of the UEFA Europa League Round of 32 against Napoli, losing 3–1 on aggregate and resulting in Swansea City's elimination from the tournament. Emnes later played a role for Swansea City's two consecutive wins between 19 April 2014 and 26 April 2014, setting up two goals for Wilfried Bony. Emnes scored his first Premier League goal on his return to Swansea on 11 May 2014 in a 3–1 away win over Sunderland.

Ahead of the 2014–15 season, Emnes signed permanently with the club in July 2014 for an undisclosed fee, signing a three-year contract. However, at the start of the season, he suffered an injury that kept him out throughout August. Emnes' first game after signing for the club on a permanent basis came on 20 September 2014, coming on as a late substitute, in a 1–0 loss against Southampton. Three days later on 23 September 2014, Emnes scored his first competitive goal for Swansea, on his return, in a 3–0 home win over Everton in the League Cup. A month later on 26 October 2014, he scored his second goal for the club, in a 2–1 away loss against Liverpool. However, Emnes found himself behind the pecking order in the striker position and placed on the substitute bench, as well as, his own injury concern. Despite this, he does appear in the starting line–up when the club lose their players, due to injuries.

At the start of the 2015–16 season, Emnes scored his first goal in his first appearance, which came in the first round of the League Cup, in a 3–0 win against York City. However, his first team opportunities continued to be limited, as he found himself placed on the substitute bench and used as a cover once again. It was not until on 28 December 2015 when Emnes made his first league appearance of the season, making a start and played for 56 minutes before being substituted, in a 0–0 draw against Crystal Palace. At the end of the 2015–16 season, he made four appearances and scored once in all competitions. He was one of eight players released by Swansea at the end of the 2016–17 season.

==== Blackburn Rovers (loan) ====
After making one appearance for Swansea City in the 2016–17 season, it was announced on 31 August 2016 that Emnes signed a loan for Football League Championship side Blackburn Rovers until 15 January 2017.

Emnes made his Blackburn Rovers debut on 10 September 2016, coming on as a 77th-minute substitute, in a 1–1 draw against Queens Park Rangers. He scored his first goal for the club in a 2–1 loss against Leeds United on 13 September 2016. Emnes then scored the two goals in the next two matches against Rotherham United and Derby County. However, during a 1–0 loss against Sheffield Wednesday on 27 September 2016, Emnes had a goal wrongly disallowed when "Danny Graham was adjudged to have been in an offside position." After the match, the officials made an apology to the club. Having initially started out on the substitute bench, he quickly found himself in the starting line–up in the striker position for the side. His performance was praised by Manager Owen Coyle. However, during a 2–1 loss against Aston Villa on 5 November 2016, Emnes suffered a hamstring injury that kept him out for weeks. It was not until on 26 November 2016 when he returned from injury, coming on as a 62nd-minute substitute, in a 1–0 win against Newcastle United. Despite facing criticism for his lack of goals and can go missing in matches, Emnes continued to be involved in the first team until his loan spell at Blackburn Rovers ended on 15 January 2017.

After returning to Swansea in early January 2017, he re-signed on loan for Blackburn a few weeks later. Emnes' first game after signing for the club on loan for the second time came on 4 February 2017 against Queens Park Rangers and set up a goal for Sam Gallagher to score the winning goal, in a 1–0 win. Since re–joining the club, he found his first team appearances harder to come by, used mainly as a substitute once again. It was not until on 4 March 2017 when Emnes scored his fourth goal for the club, in a 1–0 win against Wigan Athletic. His goal against Wigan Athletic earned him shortlisted for the Sky Bet Championship Goal of the Month award for March. He then assisted two goals for Craig Conway in two matches between 14 March 2017 and 18 March 2017 against Fulham and Preston North End. In the last game of the season against Brentford, he assisted Conway for the third time this season, as Blackburn Rovers won 3–1 but other results went against them and they were relegated to League One. At the end of the 2016–17 season, Emnes went on to make thirty–seven appearances and scoring four times in all competitions.

=== Akhisar Belediyespor ===
In summer 2017, Emnes left England to sign a three-year contract with Turkish side Akhisar Belediyespor.

Emnes made his Akhisar Belediyespor debut, coming on as a 59th-minute substitute, in a 2–0 loss against Akhisar Belediyespor on 23 September 2017. A month later on 24 October 2017, he set up two goals for Ioan Hora, who scored a hat–trick, in a 6–0 win against Erzincanspor in the fourth round of Türkiye Kupası. However, Emnes was plagued by injuries throughout his time at Akhisar Belediyespor and never played again. It was announced on 16 April 2018 that he had left the club by mutual consent. Emnes reflected his time at Akhisar Belediyespor, saying: "Akhisarspor says I have a contract, but I say I don't have a contract. It is a vague situation. But what I can say is that things are not on paper. If you sign a contract somewhere, you have to deal with rules. In this case it has not happened in many ways from the club side. But things have happened why I don't go back to that club." He later stated he was even threatened in his own house by four men to sign the contract. In the end he fled the country.

=== Vancouver Whitecaps FC ===
On 6 September 2018, Emnes joined Major League Soccer side Vancouver Whitecaps FC after receiving offers from clubs in China, England, the United States, and Italy. Emnes was released by Vancouver at the end of their 2018 season, without making an appearance for the club.

=== Ravenna ===
On 31 March 2021, more than three years after he last played a competitive game, he signed with Italian third-tier Serie C club Ravenna until the end of the 2020–21 season, with the club last in the standings at the time with 7 games remaining in the season. The club was relegated to amateur fourth-tier Serie D at the end of the season, making Emnes a free agent.

== International career ==
Born in the Netherlands, Emnes is of Surinamese descent. After previously represented Netherlands U16 in 2003, Emnes was part of the Netherlands under-17 squad that reached third place at the 2005 FIFA U-17 World Championship two years later. He scored two goals in the tournament.

In March 2006, Emnes was called up to the Netherlands U19 squad for the first time. He made his only Netherlands U19 debut, which came against France U19 on 29 March 2006. Two months later, Emnes was called up to the U21 squad for the Toulon Tournament, where they finished as runner up. In May 2008, he was considered to be included in the squad for the 2008 Summer Olympics in Beijing, but did not make the final cut.

Emnes also made three appearances for the Netherlands under-21 side between 2007 and 2009.

== Personal life ==
Born in Rotterdam, Netherlands, Emnes grew up in Snellemanplein. Like his father, he grew up supporting AFC Ajax. Emnes has a daughter.

In August 2013, Emnes was fined £265 and given six penalty points after being caught speeding, even before passing his driving test.

== Career statistics ==
As of 8 May 2017

Club	Season	League			FA Cup		League Cup		Other		Total	
Club	Season	Division	Apps	Goals	Apps	Goals	Apps	Goals	Apps	Goals	Apps	Goals
Sparta Rotterdam	2005–06	Eredivisie	10	1	—		—		—		10	1
Sparta Rotterdam	2006–07	Eredivisie	16	0	—		—		—		16	0
Sparta Rotterdam	2007–08	Eredivisie	29	8	—		—		—		29	8
Sparta Rotterdam	Total		55	9	—		—		—		55	9
Middlesbrough	2008–09	Premier League	15	0	4	1	2	1	0	0	21	2
Middlesbrough	2009–10	Championship	16	1	1	0	1	0	0	0	18	1
Middlesbrough	2010–11	Championship	23	3	0	0	0	0	0	0	23	3
Middlesbrough	2011–12	Championship	42	14	3	1	3	3	0	0	48	18
Middlesbrough	2012–13	Championship	24	5	1	0	3	1	0	0	28	6
Middlesbrough	2013–14	Championship	21	1	1	0	1	0	0	0	23	1
Middlesbrough	Total		141	24	10	2	10	5	0	0	161	31
Swansea City (loan)	2010–11	Championship	4	2	0	0	1	0	0	0	5	2
Swansea City (loan)	2013–14	Premier League	7	1	0	0	0	0	2	0	9	1
Swansea City	2014–15	Premier League	17	0	1	0	2	2	0	0	20	2
Swansea City	2015–16	Premier League	2	0	1	0	1	1	0	0	4	1
Swansea City	2016–17	Premier League	0	0	—		—		1	0	1	0
Swansea City	Total		30	3	2	0	4	3	3	0	39	6
Blackburn Rovers (loan)	2016–17	Championship	35	4	1	0	1	0	0	0	37	4
Career total			261	39	13	2	15	8	3	0	292	50
