= 2005–06 Eredivisie =

50th season of the Eredivisie

Eredivisie
- Season: 2005–06
- Dates: 12 August 2005 – 16 April 2006
- Champions: PSV (19th title)
- Promoted: Heracles Almelo; Sparta Rotterdam
- Relegated: RBC Roosendaal
- Champions League: PSV; Ajax
- UEFA Cup: FC Groningen; AZ; Feyenoord sc Heerenveen
- Intertoto Cup: FC Twente
- Top goalscorer: (Netherlands) Klaas-Jan Huntelaar (33 goals)

Locations of the 2005–06 Eredivisie teams
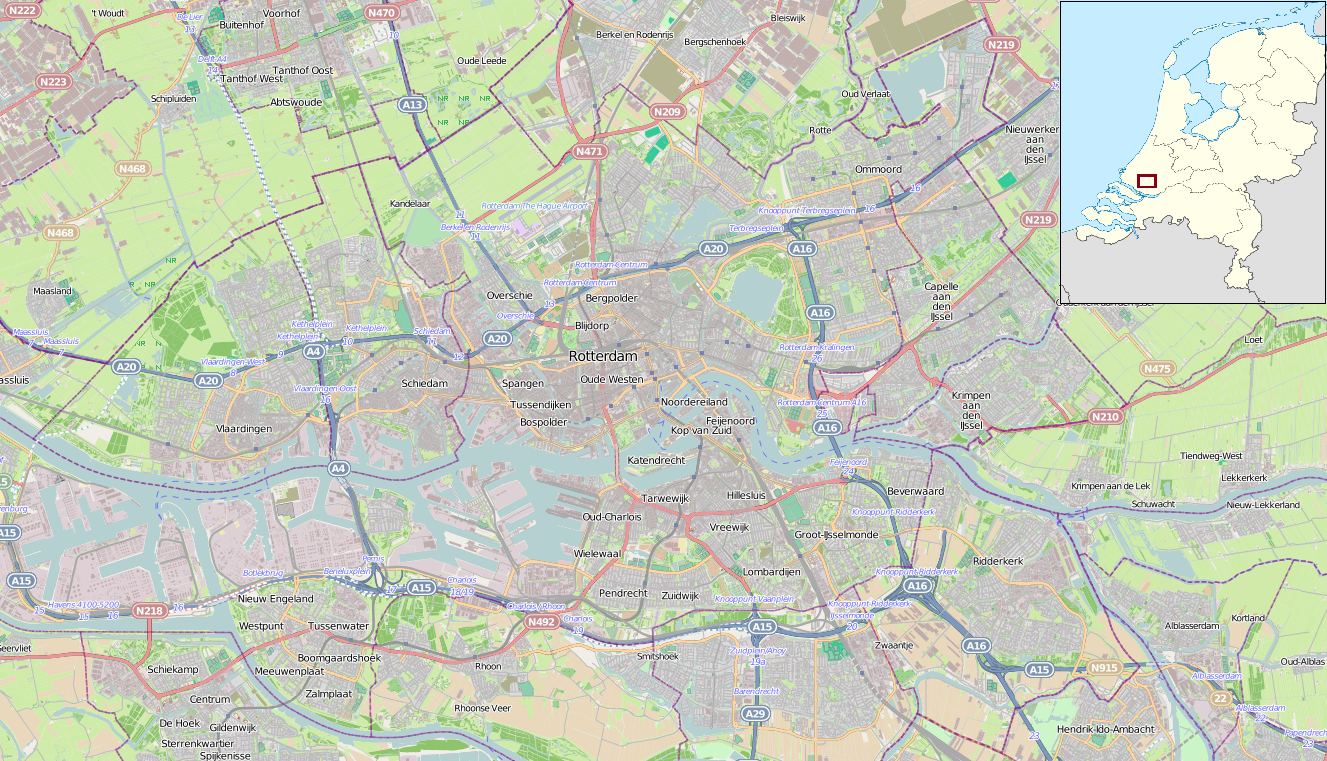
Rotterdam Eredivisie football clubs

The 2005–06 season of the Eredivisie began in August 2005 and ended in May 2006. PSV Eindhoven became champion on April 9, 2006. The season was overshadowed by the death of FC Utrecht player David di Tommaso.

== Promoted teams ==
These teams were promoted from the Eerste Divisie at the start of the season:

- Heracles Almelo (First Division champion)
- Sparta Rotterdam (playoffs)

== Relegated teams ==
These team was relegated to the Eerste Divisie at the end of the season:

- RBC Roosendaal

== League table ==
Pos	Team	Pld	W	D	L	GF	GA	GD	Pts	Qualification or relegation
1	PSV (C)	34	26	6	2	71	23	+48	84	Qualification to Champions League group stage
2	AZ	34	23	5	6	78	32	+46	74	Qualification to Champions League third qualifying round playoff
3	Feyenoord	34	21	8	5	79	34	+45	71	Qualification to Champions League third qualifying round playoff
4	Ajax (Note: Ajax won the 2005–06 KNVB Cup)	34	18	6	10	66	41	+25	60	Qualification to Champions League third qualifying round playoff
5	Groningen	34	16	8	10	46	43	+3	56	Qualification to Champions League third qualifying round playoff
6	Utrecht	34	16	7	11	48	44	+4	55	Qualification to Europa League first round playoff
7	Heerenveen	34	14	8	12	63	58	+5	50	Qualification to Europa League first round playoff
8	Roda JC	34	15	5	14	57	54	+3	50	Qualification to Europa League first round playoff
9	Twente	34	13	8	13	44	36	+8	47	Qualification to Europa League first round playoff
10	NEC	34	13	8	13	43	43	0	47	Qualification to Intertoto Cup third round playoff
11	Vitesse	34	13	5	16	52	54	−2	44	Qualification to Intertoto Cup third round playoff
12	RKC	34	11	6	17	48	58	−10	39	Qualification to Intertoto Cup third round playoff
13	Heracles	34	11	6	17	35	58	−23	39	Qualification to Intertoto Cup third round playoff
14	Sparta	34	10	7	17	34	50	−16	37	
15	ADO	34	10	5	19	36	62	−26	35	
16	NAC	34	8	9	17	45	66	−21	33	Qualification to relegation play-offs
17	Willem II	34	7	7	20	45	66	−21	28	Qualification to relegation play-offs
18	RBC (R)	34	1	6	27	22	90	−68	9	Relegation to Eerste Divisie

Rules for classification: 1) points; 2) goal difference; 3) number of goals scored.
(C) Champions; (R) Relegated

== Results ==
Home \ Away	ADO	AJX	AZ	FEY	GRO	HEE	HER	NAC	NEC	PSV	RBC	RKC	RJC	SPA	TWE	UTR	VIT	WIL
ADO Den Haag		1–2	0–2	2–1	2–1	1–0	0–0	0–3	0–1	0–2	3–0	2–1	1–1	0–2	0–0	2–3	2–0	1–1
Ajax	2–2		1–0	1–2	3–2	0–0	0–0	3–2	1–1	0–0	6–0	4–1	4–1	6–0	2–0	1–4	2–1	1–0
AZ	3–1	4–2		1–0	1–1	2–1	2–2	3–2	3–2	1–2	7–0	3–0	2–0	3–0	0–0	2–3	1–0	5–1
Feyenoord	0–2	3–2	2–0		4–1	5–1	7–1	2–0	3–0	1–0	2–0	1–1	0–0	4–0	4–2	3–0	0–0	6–1
Groningen	3–1	3–2	0–0	1–1		2–0	0–0	3–2	3–0	1–0	1–0	1–0	1–0	0–1	1–0	2–1	2–1	2–0
Heerenveen	3–0	4–2	2–4	1–1	4–0		1–0	2–1	2–1	2–3	2–0	2–1	5–4	0–0	3–1	1–1	4–1	3–3
Heracles	1–3	1–3	0–2	0–4	2–1	1–1		4–2	0–2	1–1	3–0	1–1	0–1	1–0	0–4	1–1	3–1	1–0
NAC Breda	4–1	0–2	2–1	3–3	2–2	0–3	2–1		2–1	2–6	2–1	1–2	0–4	0–0	1–1	0–1	2–2	1–0
N.E.C.	5–0	1–0	0–2	1–2	2–2	4–1	2–0	1–1		0–2	3–1	1–3	0–3	0–0	0–3	0–0	1–0	2–0
PSV Eindhoven	3–0	1–0	3–0	1–1	1–1	4–1	1–0	3–0	1–0		2–0	2–0	3–2	3–0	1–1	1–0	2–1	4–1
RBC Roosendaal	1–2	0–2	0–5	2–2	1–2	0–2	1–2	1–2	2–0	1–2		1–1	0–2	1–1	1–1	1–2	0–3	1–1
RKC Waalwijk	3–0	2–4	0–1	2–1	2–1	2–2	0–2	4–1	1–3	4–4	1–1		2–0	3–2	2–3	2–3	0–1	1–0
Roda JC	3–1	2–1	1–4	2–3	1–3	2–1	2–1	3–3	0–1	0–3	5–1	1–0		1–1	2–0	2–1	3–2	0–2
Sparta Rotterdam	2–3	1–2	0–1	1–3	1–0	1–2	2–0	1–0	1–3	0–1	5–0	3–2	2–3		1–0	0–1	1–0	3–2
Twente	2–0	2–3	1–3	1–3	1–1	1–2	2–0	1–0	0–1	0–1	4–1	2–0	1–0	1–0		3–0	0–1	3–1
Utrecht	1–1	1–0	1–2	3–1	0–2	2–0	1–0	2–2	1–1	1–2	4–1	3–1	2–1	1–1	1–3		1–1	1–4
Vitesse Arnhem	3–1	0–2	0–5	0–1	2–0	2–2	0–1	2–1	1–1	1–3	5–1	4–2	1–3	3–1	1–2	1–0		2–1
Willem II	1–0	0–2	1–3	1–3	5–0	4–3	1–2	2–0	2–2	0–3	3–1	1–2	2–2	0–0	0–0	0–1	3–4	

Source: vi.nl (in Dutch)
Legend: Blue = home team win; Yellow = draw; Red = away team win.

== Topscorers ==
Pos.	Player	Club	Goals
1.	(Netherlands) Klaas-Jan Huntelaar	Heerenveen / Ajax	33
2.	(Georgia (country)) Shota Arveladze	AZ	22
2.	(Netherlands) Dirk Kuyt	Feyenoord	22
4.	(Peru) Jefferson Farfán	PSV Eindhoven	21
5.	(Ivory Coast) Salomon Kalou	Feyenoord	15

== Awards ==
=== Dutch Footballer of the Year ===
- 2005 / 2006 — Dirk Kuyt (Feyenoord Rotterdam)

=== Dutch Golden Shoe Winner ===
- 2005 — Mark van Bommel (PSV Eindhoven)

== The 2005-06 Eredivisie play-offs ==
Prior to finishing on 4th place in the regular season, Ajax had already reached the KNVB Cup final. In this final, they faced and defeated Eredivisie champions PSV. Ajax would have qualified for the UEFA Cup via the cup even if they had lost the final. This had consequences for the play-off schedule. Games F and H were not played. The teams ranked 2 to 5 instead played for one Champions League qualifier ticket and three UEFA Cup tickets. The fourth and final UEFA Cup ticket went to the winner of matches C, D and G, between the teams who finished from 6th to 9th place in the regular season. The loser of match G played the winner of a play-off between positions 10 to 13 of the regular league for a place in the UEFA Intertoto Cup. All rounds were played in two legs, one home match and one away match, with away goals as the first tiebreaker.

=== For UEFA competitions ===
For one Champions League ticket and three UEFA Cup tickets

Matches A and B
5	Groningen (advances on aggregate)	4
2	AZ	3
4	Ajax (advances on aggregate)	7
3	Feyenoord	2

Match E
A	Groningen	2
B	Ajax (advances on aggregate)	3

For one UEFA Cup ticket and possibly one Intertoto Cup ticket

Matches C and D
9	Twente (advances on aggregate)	5
6	Utrecht	1
8	Roda JC	0
7	Heerenveen (advances on aggregate)	1

Match G
C	Twente	0
D	Heerenveen (advances on aggregate)	6

For possibly one Intertoto Cup ticket

Matches H and I
13	Heracles	3
10	NEC (advances on aggregate)	4
12	RKC	4
11	Vitesse (advances on aggregate)	6

Match J
I	Vitesse (advances on aggregate)	2
H	NEC	1

For the Intertoto Cup ticket

Match K
G	Twente (advances on aggregate)	3
J	Vitesse	1

Overview

European Competition	Qualified Team(s)
Champions League third qualifying round	AFC Ajax
UEFA Cup	FC Groningen; AZ; Feyenoord sc Heerenveen
Intertoto Cup third round	FC Twente

=== For promotion and relegation ===
For two Eredivisie tickets
Round 1

Team 1	Agg.	Team 2	1st leg	2nd leg
FC Zwolle	4–2	HFC Haarlem	1–1	3–1
TOP Oss	5–0	AGOVV	3–0	2–0

Round 2 (best of 3)

Team 1	Pts	Team 2	1st leg	2nd leg	3rd leg
TOP Oss	2-5	NAC	0–0	2–2	1–3 (aet)
De Graafschap	4–1	VVV	1–1	4–2	Not played
Helmond Sport	3–6	FC Volendam	0–1	3–2	1–2 (aet)
FC Zwolle	0–6	Willem II	2–4	2–6	Not played

Round 3 (best of 3)

Team 1	Pts	Team 2	1st leg	2nd leg	3rd leg
De Graafschap	0-6	Willem II	0–1	1–2	Not played
FC Volendam	1–4	NAC	1–2	0–0	Not played

NAC Breda and Willem II remained in the Eredivisie.

== Attendances ==
No.	Club	Average	Change	Highest
1	AFC Ajax	47,281	-2,7%	50,150
2	Feyenoord	39,824	4,0%	45,000
3	PSV	33,082	4,4%	34,700
4	sc Heerenveen	20,453	10,9%	21,000
5	FC Utrecht	19,546	-0,3%	24,500
6	SBV Vitesse	19,501	3,7%	24,400
7	FC Groningen	15,594	30,3%	20,000
8	NAC Breda	14,525	15,7%	16,385
9	FC Twente	13,101	-0,1%	13,900
10	Roda JC	13,006	2,3%	16,200
11	Willem II	12,123	-3,0%	14,100
12	NEC	11,900	0,9%	12,500
13	Sparta Rotterdam	8,954	55,7%	11,000
14	AZ	8,426	1,9%	8,747
15	Heracles Almelo	8,324	45,8%	8,800
16	ADO Den Haag	6,808	7,0%	10,150
17	RKC Waalwijk	5,695	-2,0%	7,400
18	RBC Roosendaal	4,344	-10,3%	5,000

== See also ==
- 2005–06 Eerste Divisie
- 2005–06 KNVB Cup
- 2005–06 Sparta Rotterdam season
