= Berry Hoogeveen =

Dutch footballer (born 1978)

Personal information
- Date of birth: 22 August 1978 (age 48)
- Place of birth: Emmen, Netherlands
- Position: Midfielder

Senior career*
Years	Team	Apps	(Gls)
1998–2001	Emmen	64	(7)
2001–2004	Heracles	90	(7)
2004–2006	Veendam	54	(5)
2006–2007	Cambuur	31	(5)
2007–2010	WKE		
2010–2012	HHC		
2012–2017	DZOH		
Total		239	(24)
- * Club domestic league appearances and goals

Berry Hoogeveen (born 22 August 1978) is a Dutch retired footballer who played as a midfielder.

== Career ==
Hoogeveen played in the Eerste Divisie for FC Emmen, Heracles Almelo, SC Veendam and SC Cambuur between 1998 and 2007.

After the 2006–07 season, Hoogeveen moved to the lower tiers of Dutch football, playing on amateur contracts with WKE, HHC Hardenberg and DZOH, before retiring from football altogether in 2017.
