= Danny Koevermans =

Dutch footballer (born 1978)

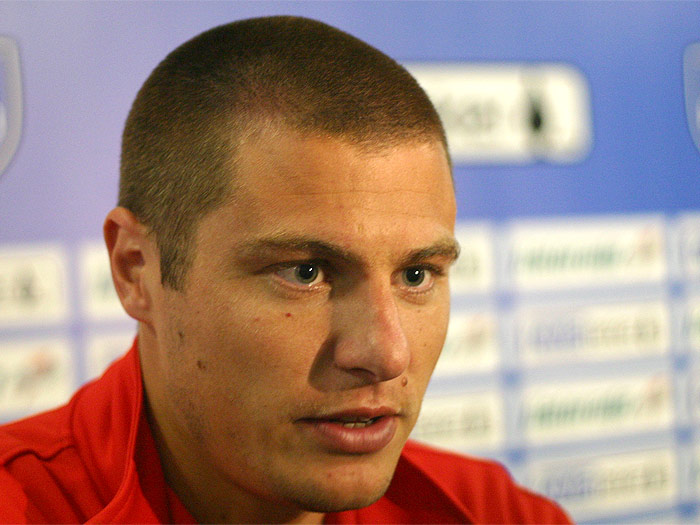
- Koevermans in 2007

Personal information
- Date of birth: 1 November 1978 (age 47)
- Place of birth: Schiedam, Netherlands
- Height: 1.91 m (6 ft 3 in)
- Position: Forward

Senior career*
Years	Team	Apps	(Gls)
2000–2005	Sparta Rotterdam	110	(71)
2005–2007	AZ	52	(31)
2007–2011	PSV	93	(34)
2011–2013	Toronto FC	30	(17)
2014	FC Utrecht	3	(0)
Total		287	(153)

International career
2007	Netherlands	4	(1)

Managerial career
- 2014–2015: FC Utrecht (assistant manager)
- 2015–2016: Sparta Rotterdam (assistant manager)
- 2019–2021: PSV (women) (assistant manager)
- * Club domestic league appearances and goals

Danny Koevermans (born 1 November 1978) is a Dutch former professional footballer who played as a forward.

== Club career ==
=== Early career ===
Born in Schiedam, Koevermans began his career with the amateurs of Excelsior'20, then went to Sparta Rotterdam, playing there for five seasons.

=== AZ ===
In 2005, Koevermans switched to AZ, where he started as a second-choice centre forward, although he bagged numerous goals. His breakthrough came in the 2006–07 season, being one of Eredivisie's top scorers with 22, and reaching the Netherlands national football team, aged 28.

He rejected a contract offer from AZ to extend his tenure at the club and his manager Louis van Gaal informed him that he would not be a first-team regular from then on with this resulting in his pushing for a move to another club.

=== PSV Eindhoven ===
Late August 2007 Koevermans joined PSV Eindhoven for a fee of €6 million where he received the number 10 jersey, last worn by Ivorian striker Arouna Koné, who was sold to Sevilla FC.

=== Toronto FC ===
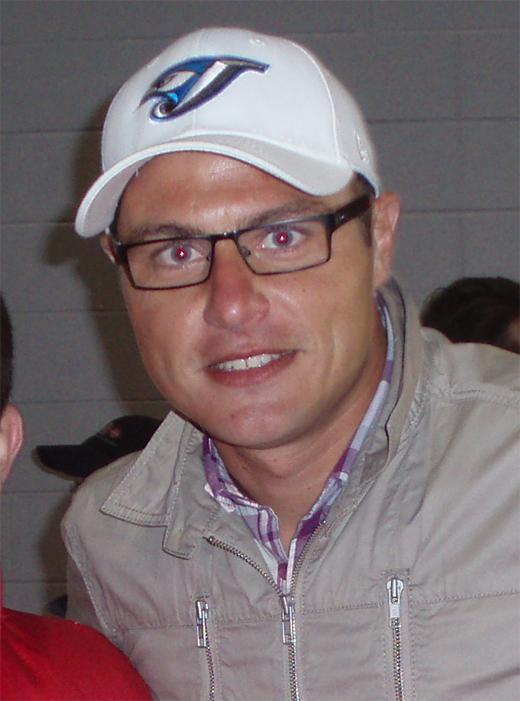
Koevermans in 2012

On 29 June 2011, it was announced the Koevermans had reached an agreement to join Major League Soccer team Toronto FC (TFC) as a designated player. The signing of former German International Torsten Frings was announced at the same press conference. Koevermans made his debut for Toronto in a 1–0 home defeat to FC Dallas on 20 July 2011. He scored his first goal for Toronto on a cross from Ryan Johnson three days later against Sporting Kansas City in a 4–2 away loss. He was awarded MLS Player of the week for his two-goal performance against Colorado Rapids on 17 September, leading Toronto to a 2–1 home victory over the reigning league champions.

After failing to score in the first six games of the 2012 season Koevermans scored his first goal against Montreal Impact on 7 April, the game finished in a 2–1 away loss for Toronto.

Perhaps Koevermans most memorable act during his time with TFC was after their ninth straight loss at the start of the 2012 season, when he said the club was "setting a record as the worst team in the world," and Koevermans reiterated the sentiment at the next training session when he said "name me one team in the whole world that is 0-9."

In mid-2012, Koevermans was in fine scoring form but suffered a season-ending ACL injury in mid-July against New England Revolution. Following his injury Toronto was forced to bring in designated player Eric Hassli as a replacement. Koevermans made his return from injury nearly a year later on 1 June 2013 as a second half sub for Jeremy Brockie in a 1–1 against Philadelphia Union.

=== FC Utrecht ===
On 31 January 2014, it was announced that Koevermans had signed a deal until the summer of 2014 with FC Utrecht. On 20 March 2014, Koevermans announced his retirement from football due to a persevering calf injury.

== International career ==
Koevermans made his international debut for the Netherlands in a Euro 2008 qualifier against Slovenia on 28 March 2007. He scored his first international goal on 17 November 2007 against Luxembourg.

== Style of play ==
A forward, Koevermans was a physical player who was adapted in the air and a lethal poacher in front of the goal. In addition to goal scoring, he was known for his offensive movement and "runs" off the ball, which "always [attracted] the attention of defenders".

== Career statistics ==
=== Club ===
Appearances and goals by club, season and competition
Club	Season	League			National cup (Note: Includes KNVB Cup, Canadian Championship)		League cup (Note: Includes MLS Playoffs)		Continental		Other		Total	
Club	Season	Division	Apps	Goals	Apps	Goals	Apps	Goals	Apps	Goals	Apps	Goals	Apps	Goals
Sparta Rotterdam	2000–01	Eredivisie	4	0	1	0	—		—				5	0
Sparta Rotterdam	2001–02	Eredivisie	23	7	1	1	—		—				24	8
Sparta Rotterdam	2002–03	Eerste Divisie	34	25	2	2	—		—				36	27
Sparta Rotterdam	2003–04	Eerste Divisie	20	15	2	4	—		—		6 (Note: Appearances in relegation play-offs)	2	28	21
Sparta Rotterdam	2004–05	Eerste Divisie	29	24	1	3	—		—		6	3	36	30
Sparta Rotterdam	Total		110	71	7	10	0	0	0	0	12	5	129	86
AZ	2005–06	Eredivisie	21	9	2	1	—		5	2	2 (Note: Appearances in play-offs for UEFA Champions League)	1	30	13
AZ	2006–07	Eredivisie	31	22	2	2	—		10	4	4	0	47	28
AZ	Total		52	31	4	3	0	0	15	6	6	1	77	41
PSV Eindhoven	2007–08	Eredivisie	29	14	1	1	—		11	1			41	16
PSV Eindhoven	2008–09	Eredivisie	28	8	1	0	—		6	4			35	12
PSV Eindhoven	2009–10	Eredivisie	22	11	3	1	—		7	1			32	13
PSV Eindhoven	2010–11	Eredivisie	14	1	3	4	—		3	0			20	5
PSV Eindhoven	Total		93	34	8	6	0	0	27	6			128	46
Toronto FC	2011	MLS	10	8	0	0	—		7	2	—		17	10
Toronto FC	2012	MLS	16	9	1	0	0	0	3	0	—		20	9
Toronto FC	2013	MLS	4	0	0	0	0	0	0	0	—		3	0
Toronto FC	Total		30	17	1	0	0	0	10	2	—		40	19
FC Utrecht	2013–14	Eredivisie	3	0	0	0	—		—				3	0
Career total			288	153	20	19	0	0	52	14	18	6	377	192

=== International ===
Scores and results list the Netherlands' goal tally first, score column indicates score after each Koevermans goal.

List of international goals scored by Danny Koevermans
No.	Date	Venue	Opponent	Score	Result	Competition
1	17 November 2007	De Kuip, Rotterdam, Netherlands	Luxembourg	1–0	1–0	Euro 2008 qualifying

== Honours ==
PSV Eindhoven

- Eredivisie: 2007–08
- Johan Cruijff Shield: 2008

Toronto FC

- Canadian Championship: 2012
