= Jason Oost =

Dutch former professional footballer (born 1982)

Personal information
- Full name: Jason Oost
- Date of birth: 10 October 1982 (age 44)
- Place of birth: The Hague, Netherlands
- Height: 1.86 m (6 ft 1 in)
- Position: Striker

Youth career
- SVV
- SCO '63
- 1993–2002: Feyenoord

Senior career*
Years	Team	Apps	(Gls)
2002–2005	RKC Waalwijk	84	(12)
2005–2007	Sparta Rotterdam	58	(8)
2007–2008	VVV-Venlo	31	(6)
2008–2009	De Graafschap	30	(5)
2009–2011	KVSK United	55	(10)
2011–2012	Excelsior	21	(1)
2012–2016	Almere City	115	(19)
2016–2017	Quick Boys	17	(5)
Total		411	(66)
- * Club domestic league appearances and goals

Jason Oost (born 10 October 1982) is a Dutch former professional footballer who played as a striker.

== Club career ==
Born in The Hague, Oost started his career with Feyenoord's youth teams. He signed his first professional contract with RKC Waalwijk in 2002 after rejecting a move on loan to Excelsior Rotterdam. At Waalwijk he played 84 matches in three seasons and scored 12 goals. In 2005, he moved to Sparta Rotterdam, where he became the club's top goalscorer in the 2005–06 season with 8 goals. He rejected a new contract at Sparta citing the lack of first team football as he was constantly used as a substitute.

On 2 August 2007, Oost signed a contract for two years with VVV-Venlo.

He joined De Graafschap in 2008, but when it was clear that the club relegated to the Jupiler League, Oost dissolved his contract with De Graafschap. As a free agent, Oost was on trial with N.E.C. but failed to impress, and left without getting a contract. Oost then signed a contract with Belgian second division side, KVSK United.

In July 2016, it was announced that Oost would retire from professional footballer, ending a 14-year career at the age of 33. He scored 51 goals in 339 Dutch league matches. He played another season at semi-professional level with Quick Boys afterwards.

== International career ==
Oost was born in the Netherlands, and is of Indonesian descent. He was called up to represent the Indonesia national football team in 2009, but declined the offer because he did not want to give up his Dutch passport.

== Coaching career ==
In May 2017, Oost ended his footballing career and began focusing on coaching. In the 2017–18 season he worked as an assistant coach at Jong Almere City FC and was responsible for Almere City U17.

== Private life ==
He is the son of Jeffrey Oost, the manager of the Feyenoord C1 youth team.
