= Evgeniy Levchenko =

Ukrainian footballer

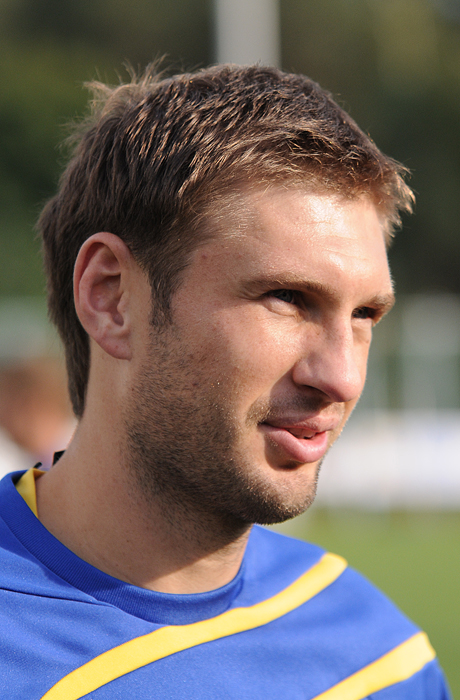
- Levchenko in 2009

Personal information
- Full name: Evgeniy Viktorovych Levchenko
- Date of birth: 2 January 1978 (age 48)
- Place of birth: Kostiantynivka, Ukrainian SSR
- Height: 1.88 m (6 ft 2 in)
- Position: Midfielder

Senior career*
Years	Team	Apps	(Gls)
1993–1994	Metalurh Kostiantynivka	6	(0)
1994–1995	Shakhtar-2 Donetsk	15	(0)
1996	CSKA-d Moscow	4	(1)
1996–2003	Vitesse	27	(1)
1997–1998	→ Helmond Sport (loan)	15	(4)
1998–2000	→ Cambuur (loan)	42	(2)
2003–2005	Sparta Rotterdam	70	(11)
2005–2009	Groningen	90	(17)
2009–2010	Saturn Moscow Oblast	7	(0)
2010–2011	Willem II	19	(3)
2011–2012	Adelaide United	10	(0)
Total		305	(39)

International career^{‡}
2002–2009	Ukraine	8	(0)
- * Club domestic league appearances and goals as of 30 January 2012 ‡ National team caps and goals as of 31 July 2011

Evgeniy Viktorovych Levchenko, also spelled Yevhen Levchenko (Ukrainian: Євген Вікторович Левченко; born 2 January 1978) is a retired Ukrainian footballer. He was the main participant of the Russian version of the show The Bachelor-Kholostyak on the Russian TV channel TNT.

== Club career ==
Yevhen started out his football career in 1993 at local club Metalurh Kostiantynivka. The following year he was transferred to Shakhtar Donetsk, one of the best football clubs in Ukraine. Two seasons later, in 1996, Levchenko moved to a Russian club CSKA Moskva, from where he progressed to Vitesse Arnhem, and finally Helmond Sport. In 1998, Yevhen joined Cambuur Leeuwarden, where he played for two years. He played for Vitesse Arnhem again from the year 2000 until 2003, when he switched to Sparta Rotterdam.

In 2005, Levchenko was transferred to another Dutch club, FC Groningen. He left FC Groningen at the end of the 2008–09 season on a free transfer, on 30 July 2009 FC Saturn Moscow Oblast signed the Ukrainian national player, he comes on a free transfer from FC Groningen of the Netherlands and signed a contract for 1.5 years. In 2010, Levchenko signed with Willem II on a free transfer. In 2011, Levchenko signed with A-League club Adelaide United on a 1-year deal. He scored his first goal for the club during an Asian Champions League playoff against Persipura Jayapura of Indonesia on 16 February 2012. On 25 March 2012, it was announced the club and player had mutually agreed to the termination of his contract.

On 30 January 2014 he announced his retirement from professional football in order to pursue a degree in marketing. On 1 July 2019 he became the president of the Dutch trade union for professional footballers.

== International career ==
In 2001 Levchenko has been called up to Ukraine national team, he was announced as a part of the squad for 2002 World Cup qualification. He made his debut for Ukraine in a qualification game against Norway and has been capped a total of 8 times.

== Personal life ==
In 2001 he became a naturalized Dutch citizen.

== See also ==
- Sparta Rotterdam season 2003–04

== Bibliography ==
- Koppe, Iris Lev, publishing house De Bezige Bij, (Dutch language), October 2015, ISBN 9789400404915
