= Kiran Bechan =

Dutch footballer (born 1982)

Personal information
- Full name: Winand Kiran Madhankumar Bechan
- Date of birth: 12 September 1982 (age 44)
- Place of birth: Amsterdam, Netherlands
- Height: 1.71 m (5 ft 7 in)
- Position: Midfielder

Youth career
- SV Amstelland United
- 1995–2000: Ajax

Senior career*
Years	Team	Apps	(Gls)
2000–2004	Ajax	1	(0)
2003–2004	→ Sparta (loan)	48	(9)
2005–2006	Groningen	18	(0)
2006–2007	→ Den Bosch (loan)	37	(9)
2007–2008	Hércules	9	(1)
2008–2009	Emmen	24	(3)
2009–2010	Ermis Aradippou	6	(0)
2010–2011	Muaither	15	(8)
2011	Atyrau	24	(1)
Total		182	(31)
- * Club domestic league appearances and goals

Winand Kiran Madhankumar Bechan (born 12 September 1982), simply known as Kiran Bechan, is a Dutch former professional footballer who played as a midfielder.

== Career ==
Bechan was a product of the Ajax football academy, which he joined at under-13 level, and made his senior debut as a starter on 1 April 2001 against NEC under head coach Co Adriaanse. He did not make the grade at Ajax and was loaned to Sparta in January 2003, only to be recalled by Ajax and sold to FC Groningen in November 2004. He was then sent on loan to FC Den Bosch in summer 2006, and in summer 2007 Bechan was released by Groningen and moved abroad to join Spanish side Hércules Alicante. There, his contract was eventually cancelled by mutual consent. He then returned to the Netherlands to play for Eerste Divisie club Emmen.

He tried his luck abroad once more when he joined Ermis Aradippou of Cyprus and he had a season at Muaither in Qatar. He then played for Kazakh side Atyrau, where he was joined by fellow Dutch player Sylvano Comvalius. Bechan received an offer in January 2012 from Macedonian club Vardar, but due to the lack of financial guarantees, he was unable to reach an agreement with the club. He then went on trial with Fujian Smart Hero in China alongside Comvalius, but during practice with the team he suffered a torn meniscus, keeping him sidelined for months. In April 2012, Major League Soccer club San Jose Earthquakes showed interest, but due to a knee injury, he was unable to travel to the United States for a medical examination. In December 2012, Bechan announced his retirement from football at age 30.

== Personal life ==
Bechan is Indo-Surinamese. After retiring from professional football, he moved to Almere, where he plays futsal at amateur level.
