= Leon Kantelberg =

Dutch footballer (born 1978)

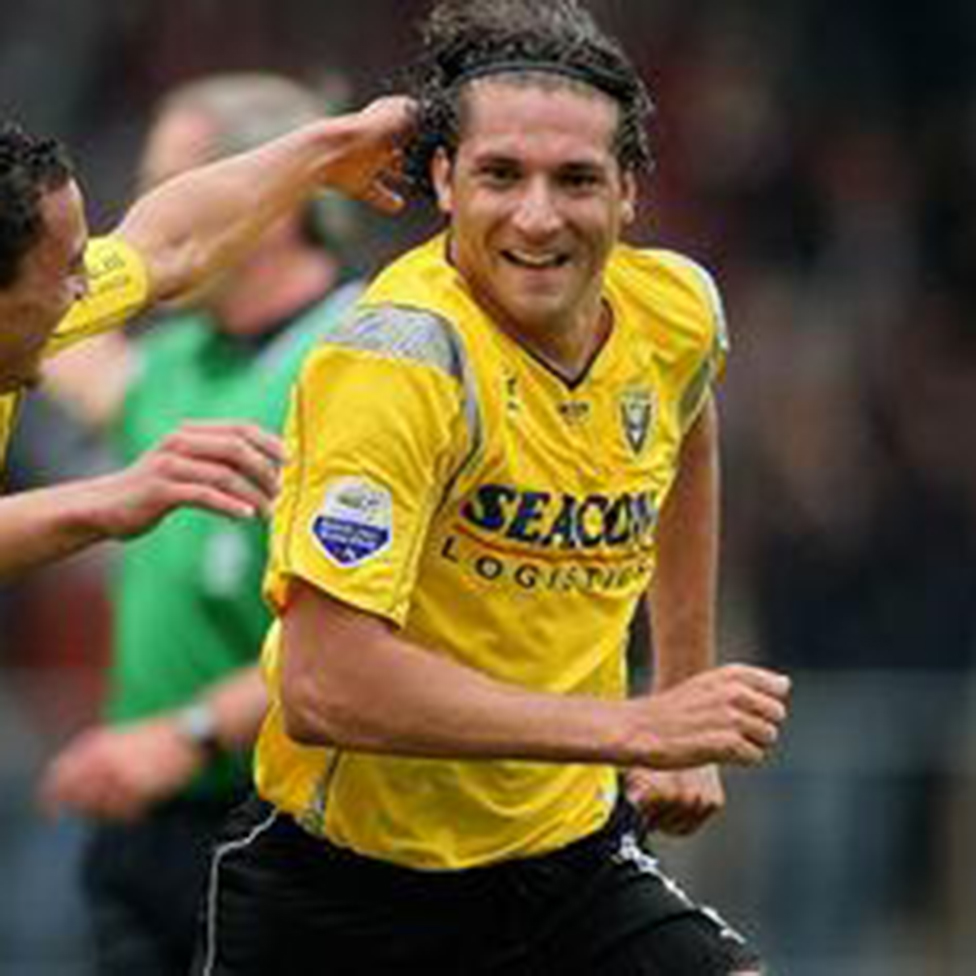
- Kantelberb with VVV-Venlo

Personal information
- Full name: Leonardus Fransiscus Emanuel Kantelberg
- Date of birth: 15 July 1978 (age 48)
- Place of birth: Eindhoven, Netherlands
- Height: 1.83 m (6 ft 0 in)
- Position: Midfielder

Senior career*
Years	Team	Apps	(Gls)
1997–1998	Helmond Sport	34	(5)
1998–1999	Utrecht	1	(0)
1999–2000	Groningen	8	(0)
2000–2003	Helmond Sport	69	(14)
2003–2005	Stormvogels Telstar	70	(22)
2005–2009	VVV-Venlo	105	(17)
2009–2012	FC Eindhoven	73	(15)
Total		360	(73)

International career
2004–2008	Netherlands Antilles	4	(0)
- * Club domestic league appearances and goals

Leonardus "Leon" Fransiscus Emanuel Kantelberg (born 15 July 1978) is a Dutch former professional footballer who played as a midfielder.

== Career ==
Kantelberg was born in Eindhoven, Netherlands. He had a trial with Valletta FC in June 2009. Before joining Valletta on trial he used to play for Eredivisie team VVV-Venlo.

Kantelberg appeared for the Netherlands Antilles national team in qualifying matches for the 2006 and 2010 FIFA World Cup.
