= Santinho Lopes Monteiro =

Cape Verdean-Dutch footballer

Personal information
- Full name: Santinho Lopes Monteiro
- Date of birth: 16 February 1978 (age 48)
- Place of birth: Rotterdam, Netherlands
- Position: Midfielder

Senior career*
Years	Team	Apps	(Gls)
1998–1999	RKC Waalwijk	1	(0)
1998–1999	→ RBC Roosendaal (loan)	15	(0)
1999–2001	Excelsior	23	(0)
2001–2007	AGOVV Apeldoorn		
2017–	Racing FC Union Luxembourg		
- * Club domestic league appearances and goals

Santinho Lopes Monteiro (born 16 February 1978 in Rotterdam, Netherlands) is a former professional footballer who holds both Dutch and Cape Verdean nationality.

== Football career ==
In the 1998/1999 season, Lopes Monteiro made his professional debut for RKC Waalwijk, appearing in the match on 20 September 1998 against SC Heerenveen.when he came on as a substitute in the 73rd minute for Adilson Ben David dos Santos. During that same season, he was loaned to RBC, for which he played 15 matches.

In 1999, Lopes Monteiro signed with Excelsior, appearing in 23 matches over two seasons. In 2001, he joined AGOVV, which was at the time still an amateur club. When AGOVV returned to professional football in 2003, he became a regular first-team player.

He concluded his professional football career in 2007 at AGOVV Apeldoorn.

As of 2017, Lopes Monteiro resides in Luxembourg, where he continues to play amateur football for Racing FC Union Luxembourg.
