= Davy De fauw =

Belgian footballer

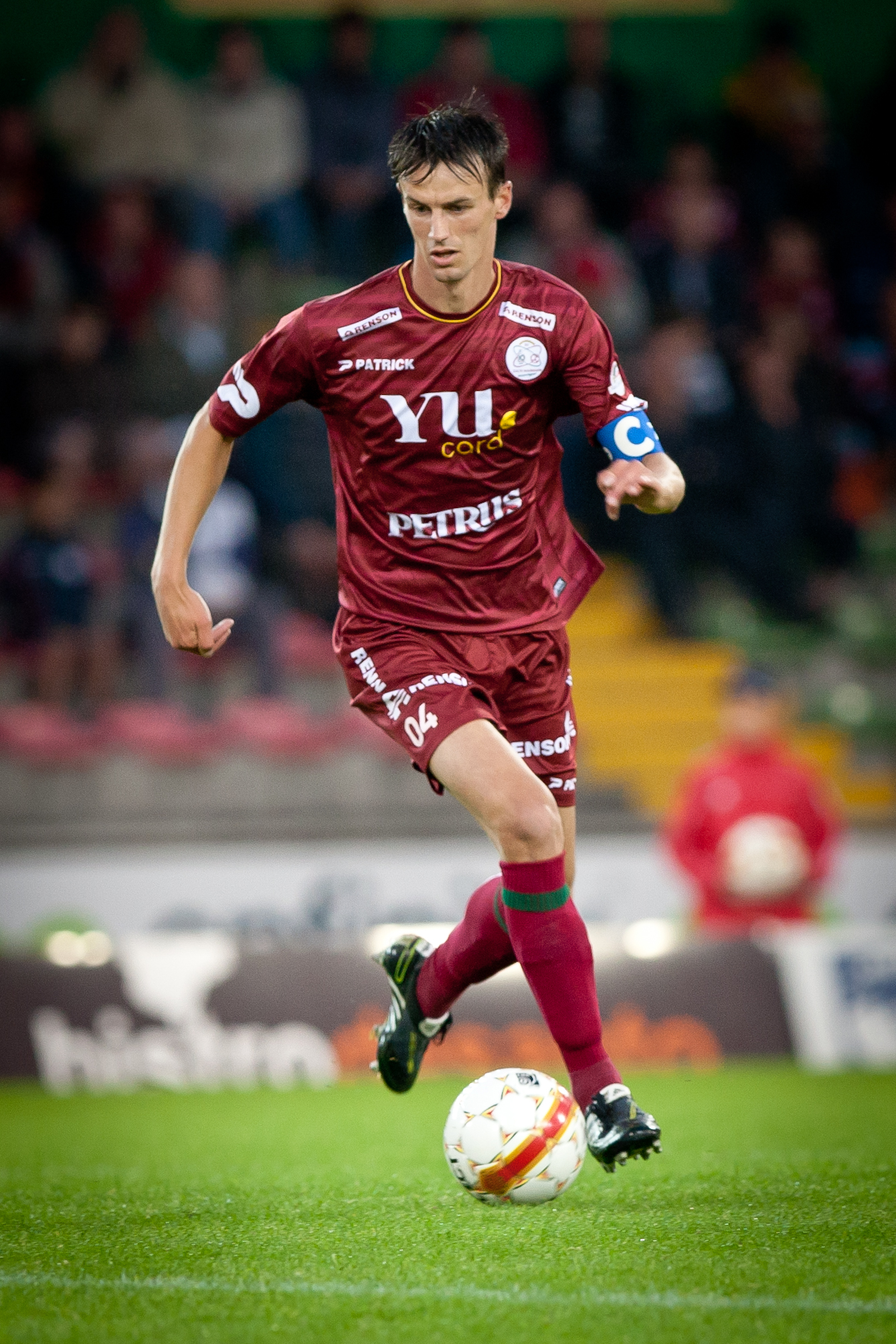
- De fauw with Zulte Waregem in 2011

Personal information
- Date of birth: 8 July 1981 (age 45)
- Place of birth: Maria-Aalter, Belgium
- Height: 1.85 m (6 ft 1 in)
- Position: Right-back

Senior career*
Years	Team	Apps	(Gls)
2000–2002	Club Brugge	0	(0)
2001–2002	→ Sparta Rotterdam (loan)	7	(0)
2002–2006	Sparta Rotterdam	133	(15)
2006–2011	Roda JC	168	(10)
2011–2014	Zulte Waregem	112	(7)
2014–2016	Club Brugge	38	(1)
2016–2020	Zulte Waregem	129	(17)
Total		587	(50)

Managerial career
- 2020–2022: Zulte Waregem (assistant)
- * Club domestic league appearances and goals

Davy De fauw (born 8 July 1981) is a Belgian former professional footballer who played as a right-back.

== Career ==
De fauw played for Club Brugge from age five until he was brought to Dutch club Sparta Rotterdam by then manager Frank Rijkaard. In the 2001–02 season, he made his professional debut for Sparta. On 16 March 2002 in the 0–4 away loss to Willem II in the Eredivisie, De fauw came on as a substitute for the injured David Mendes da Silva after 16 minutes.

In January 2006, De fauw signed for Roda JC, joining the club from 30 June 2006. There he quickly became a permanent starter in defense and made more than 180 appearances in the Eredivisie.

De fauw returned to his native Belgium in the 2011–12 season, signing for Zulte Waregem. There, he was immediately appointed team captain after the departure of Ludwin Van Nieuwenhuyze. At the start of the 2013–14 season, De fauw had to give up his captaincy to Thorgan Hazard. This was met with much anger from a section of the club's supporters and led to Hazard handing the captain's armband back less than 24 hours after receiving it.

On 20 June 2014, it was announced that De fauw had signed for Club Brugge for €200,000; thus returning to where he had started his career.

For the 2016–17 season, De fauw returned to Zulte Waregem.

=== Coaching career ===
In April 2020, De fauw announced his retirement from football. He became assistant coach of Zulte Waregem alongside Timmy Simons, a former teammate of his at Brugge.

== Personal life ==
Unusually, De fauw's family name is written with a lowercase "f". When asked about this, De fauw said: "I hail from Maria-Aalter. My dad always said that the person in the town hall may have been a little drunk and therefore wrote the family name with a small f. That's how it happened".

== Honours ==
Club Brugge

- Belgian Cup: 2014–15
- Belgian Pro League: 2015–16
