= Frank Broers =

Dutch footballer (born 1977)

Personal information
- Full name: Frank Broers
- Date of birth: August 29, 1977 (age 49)
- Place of birth: Alkmaar, Netherlands
- Position: Defender

Youth career
- TSC Oosterhout

Senior career*
Years	Team	Apps	(Gls)
1997–2001	NAC	47	(6)
2001–2003	Emmen	57	(1)
2003–2005	Sparta	59	(7)
2005–2007	VVV	46	(2)
2007–2008	Emmen	21	(0)
2008–2009	Go Ahead Eagles	12	(1)
2009–2010	Kozakken Boys		
- * Club domestic league appearances and goals as of 5 August 2009 ‡ National team caps and goals as of 9 July 2007

Frank Broers (born August 29, 1977) is a Dutch retired football defender.

== Club career ==
He made his debut in Dutch professional football on March 14, 1998 for NAC in a competition match against FC Twente (1-0). He later played for FC Emmen before joining Sparta in 2003. After being demoted to the reserves by then manager Wiljan Vloet, Broers left Sparta for VVV and he returned to Emmen in 2007. When he couldn't agree terms with Emmen for a new contract he left for Go Ahead Eagles in summer 2008.

He retired when he left amateur side Kozakken Boys in January 2011.

== Later years ==
He was named physical coach and assistant to the NAC U-21 manager in summer 2013.
