= Ruud Berger =

Dutch footballer (born 1980)

Personal information
- Full name: Rudy Johan Berger
- Date of birth: 18 February 1980 (age 46)
- Place of birth: Utrecht, Netherlands
- Height: 1.88 m (6 ft 2 in)
- Position: Midfielder

Senior career*
Years	Team	Apps	(Gls)
1998–2002	FC Utrecht	26	(0)
2001–2002	→ Cambuur (loan)	25	(2)
2002–2004	Emmen	65	(16)
2004–2005	FC Zwolle	38	(17)
2005–2010	RKC Waalwijk	96	(18)
Total		250	(53)
- * Club domestic league appearances and goals

Rudy Johan "Ruud" Berger (born 18 February 1980) is a Dutch former professional footballer who played as a midfielder. (Note: Ruud Berger at WorldFootball.net)

== Career ==
Born in Utrecht, Berger came through the FC Utrecht youth system before making his senior debut in the 1998–99 season. He was loaned to Cambuur in 2001. After two seasons at Emmen he moved to FC Zwolle in 2004.

In August 2005 he joined Eredivisie club RKC Waalwijk, but a knee injury sustained in pre-season forced him to make his debut a few months later. In summer 2010, Berger decided to quit football, citing a loss of motivation and pleasure.

== Personal life ==
His father Han Berger has coached various clubs in the Netherlands.
