= David Mendes da Silva =

Dutch footballer (born 1982)

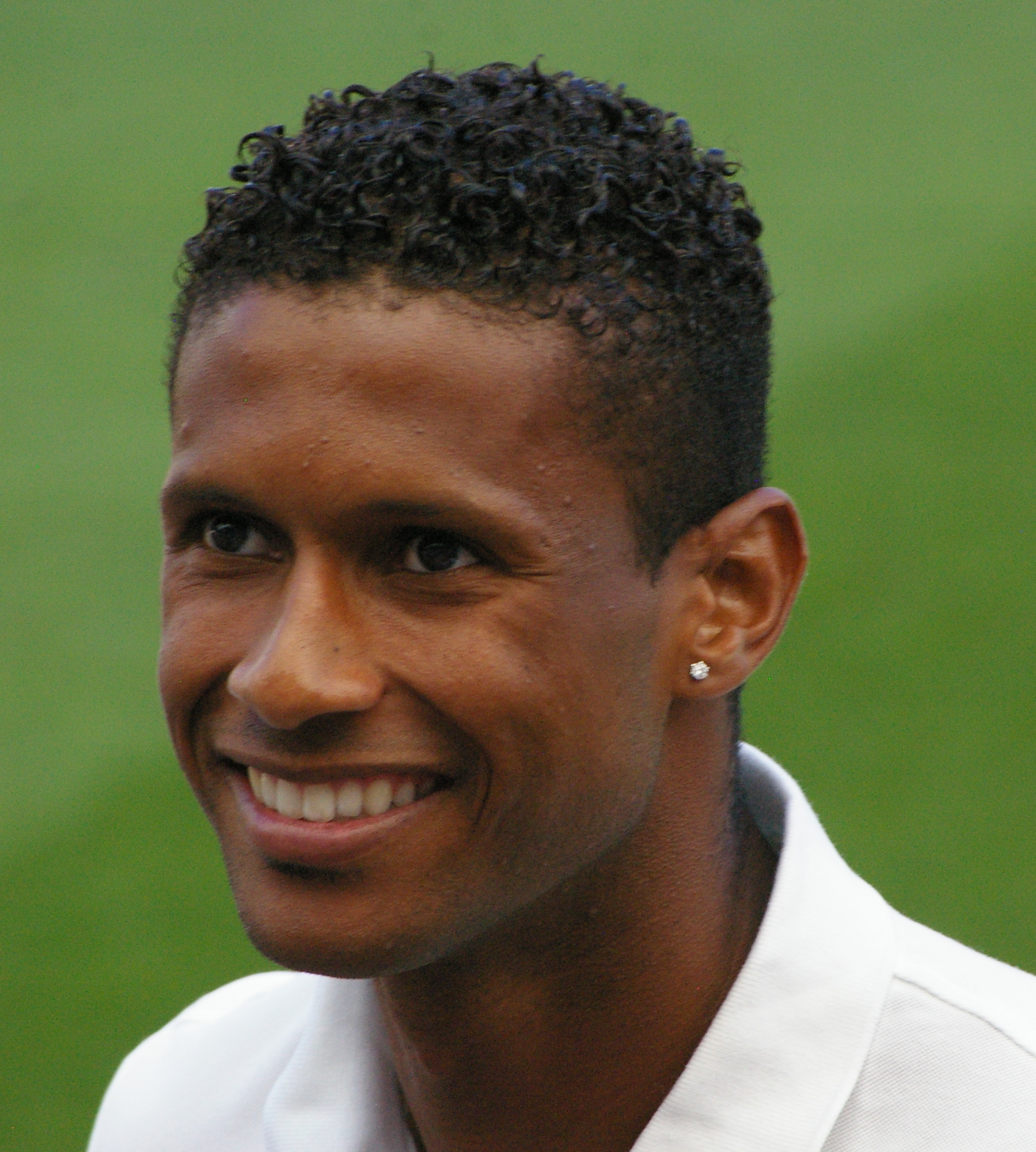
- Mendes da Silva with Red Bull Salzburg in 2012

Personal information
- Full name: Davide Miquel Mendes da Silva Gonçalves
- Date of birth: 4 August 1982 (age 44)
- Place of birth: Rotterdam, Netherlands
- Height: 1.86 m (6 ft 1 in)
- Position: Defensive midfielder

Youth career
- Activitas
- Sparta Rotterdam

Senior career*
Years	Team	Apps	(Gls)
1999–2004	Sparta Rotterdam	117	(8)
2003	→ Ajax (loan)	0	(0)
2004–2006	NAC Breda	56	(5)
2006–2010	AZ	109	(9)
2010–2013	Red Bull Salzburg	43	(4)
2013–2015	Panathinaikos	38	(0)
2016–2017	Sparta Rotterdam	9	(0)
Total		363	(26)

International career
2007–2009	Netherlands	7	(0)

Managerial career
- 2015–2016: Panathinaikos (assistant)
- * Club domestic league appearances and goals

David Miquel Mendes da Silva Gonçalves (Dutch pronunciation: [daːˈvit ˌmɛndəz daː ˈsɪlvaː]; (Note: In isolation, Mendes is pronounced [ˈmɛndəs].) born 4 August 1982) is a Dutch former professional footballer. During his career, he played for Red Bull Salzburg, AZ, Sparta Rotterdam, Ajax, Panathinaikos and NAC Breda. He was a versatile player who could play all over midfield and in defence, and was known for his dribbling technique as well as his tackling.

In 2023, Mendes da Silva was sentenced to seven years in prison for charges related to drug trafficking large amounts of cocaine, selling cocaine, and for bribing a shipping clerk for €100,000.

== Club career ==
Born in Rotterdam, Mendes da Silva started his career at hometown club Sparta Rotterdam, graduating through their youth system, signing a professional contract in 1999 and departing in 2004; he spent some time on loan at Ajax in 2003 without making any official appearances. The next stop in his career was NAC Breda, where he made 56 appearances, scoring five goals, across two seasons.

In 2006, he was signed by AZ Alkmaar on a five-year deal. He was a regular at AZ for four seasons which included a Dutch title triumph in 2008–09, making 119 appearances and scoring 11 goals in all competitions.

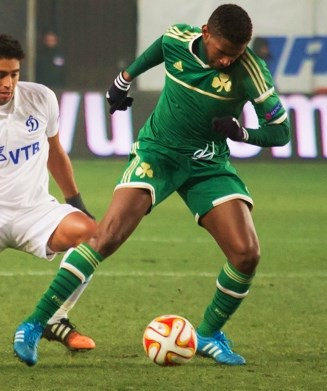
Mendes da Silva playing for Panathinaikos in 2014

In 2010 he transferred for an undisclosed fee to Red Bull Salzburg, whose coach Huub Stevens had identified Mendes da Silva as a major transfer target; he signed a three-year contract with the Austrian side. He had previously worked with Stevens' assistant Ton Lokhoff during his spell at NAC Breda.

On 20 October 2009, Mendes da Silva scored a 93rd-minute equaliser against Arsenal in the UEFA Champions League to give his team somewhat of a historic result. He stayed with Red Bull until February 2013.

On 4 July 2013, Mendes da Silva signed for Greek club Panathinaikos, managed by former Roda JC and Ajax triker Giannis Anastasiou, on a three-year deal for an undisclosed fee. With his new team he won the Greek Cup in the 2013–14 season against PAOK with a 4–1 scoreline, and after finishing first in the Super League playoffs Panathinaikos played in the third and playoff rounds of the UEFA Champions League, where they were defeated and dropped into the group stage of the 2014–15 UEFA Europa League.

== International career ==
He having played for the Dutch U-20s team at the 2001 FIFA World Youth Championship (losing to Egypt in the quarter-finals), Mendes da Silva made his full international debut for the Netherlands on 7 February 2007. In total he earned seven caps, with his last appearance for the Oranje in 2009, coming on in the 84th minute of a 0–0 draw with Australia.

== Personal life ==
Mendes da Silva is of Cape Verdean descent. His cousin, Iderlindo Moreno Freire, was also a professional footballer.

=== Arrest and conviction ===
In August 2022, Mendes da Silva was arrested as part of a Dutch investigation into large-scale drug trafficking. In July 2023, he was convicted of directly importing 179 kilograms of cocaine, preparing the import of more than 1,300 kilograms of cocaine, selling cocaine, and bribing a shipping clerk €100,000 to obtain information on container locations. He was sentenced to seven years in prison.

== Honours ==
AZ

- Eredivisie: 2008–09
- Johan Cruijff Schaal: 2009

Red Bull Salzburg

- Tipp 3 Bundesliga: 2011–12
- ÖFB-Cup: 2011–12

Panathinaikos

- Greek Cup: 2014

== See also ==
- Quincy Promes – another Dutch professional footballer involved with cocaine smuggling
