= Stadion De Braak =

Former football stadium in Helmond, Netherlands

Coordinates: 51°29′11″N 5°40′48″E

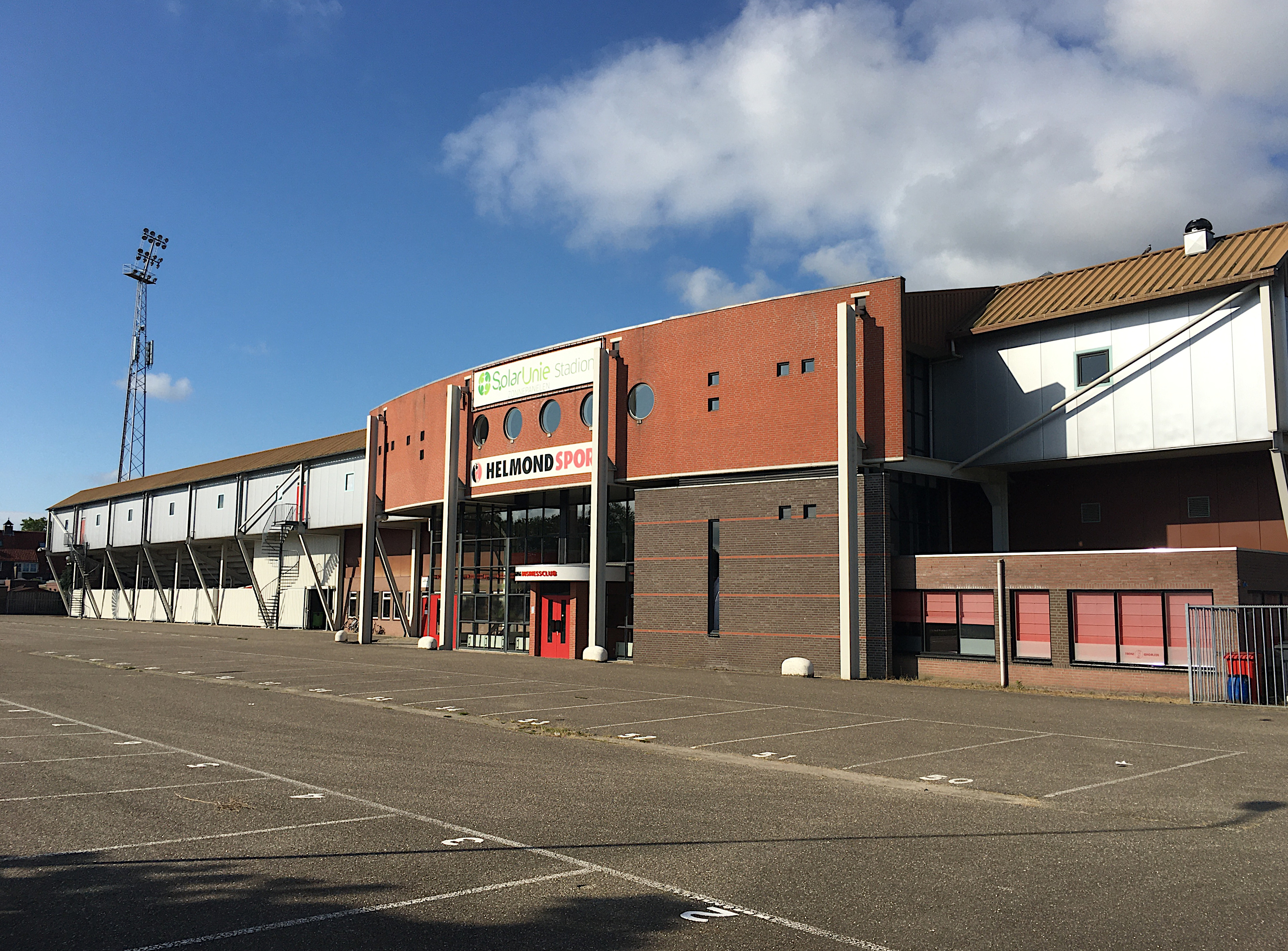
- Interactive map of Stadion De Braak
- Former names: Stadion De Braak (1916–2025); Lavans Stadion (2010–2018); SolarUnie Stadion (2018–2022); GS Staalwerken Stadion (2022–2025)
- Location: Helmond, Netherlands
- Capacity: 4,200
- Surface: grass
- Field size: 105 × 68 m

Construction
- Groundbreaking: 1916
- Opened: 1916
- Renovated: 1994, 1997, 2000
- Closed: 25 February 2025
- Demolished: March 2025

Tenants
- Helmondia '55 (1916–1967); Helmond Sport (1967–2025)

Stadion De Braak (Dutch pronunciation: [ˈstaːdijɔn də ˈbraːk]) was a football stadium in Helmond, Netherlands, which was the home of Helmond Sport and its predecessor Helmondia '55 between 1916 and February 2025.

The stadium was located between the Pronto district in Helmond-Oost and the Wilma district in Helmond-Noord.

== History ==
Throughout its existence, the stadium underwent several renovations. By the time of its closure in 2025, it had a capacity of 4,200 spectators, including 400 seats allocated for visiting supporters. The stadium featured three stands: one on each long side and one behind a short side. The opposite short side was adjacent to residential housing. Until the early 1990s, this side included an uncovered standing terrace, which was later demolished. Some residents of the houses behind the goal were known to watch matches from their sheds.

=== Renovations ===
In 1994, a new east stand was constructed, incorporating the business club along with skyboxes and sponsor facilities spanning the entire length of the stand. A new west stand followed in 1997, replacing the previous structure, which consisted of three separate stands. This redevelopment also included facilities for the press and invited guests, as well as a new supporters' clubhouse beneath the stand. However, the clubhouse was destroyed by fire shortly after completion and had to be rebuilt.

The north stand was renovated and completed in 2000, replacing a former standing terrace with seated areas. In 2007, fences inside the stadium were removed as part of further modernisation efforts.

=== New stadium ===
Following several proposals, construction of a new stadium for Helmond Sport began in 2023. Named Campus De Braak, the new facility was built adjacent to the old stadium, Stadion De Braak. In addition to hosting Helmond Sport matches, the complex includes a sports hall, a physiotherapy practice, amateur club SV De Braak, and a vocational college. The new stadium was officially inaugurated on 7 March 2025, when Helmond Sport played its first match at the venue.

== Major events ==
Due to inadequate facilities at their own sports complex in Deurne, SV Deurne hosted their KNVB Cup match against Feyenoord at the stadium on 15 January 2008. Feyenoord won 4–0, and the stadium was sold out for the occasion.

On 27 September 2018, Feyenoord returned to the stadium, this time for a KNVB Cup match against VV Gemert. For safety reasons, Gemert opted to play at the stadium rather than their own ground. Feyenoord once again won 4–0.
