= Tom van Bergen =

Dutch footballer (born 1981)

Personal information
- Date of birth: 9 September 1981 (age 45)
- Place of birth: Blerick, Netherlands
- Height: 1.82 m (6 ft 0 in)
- Positions: Defender; midfielder

Youth career
- VVV

Senior career*
Years	Team	Apps	(Gls)
2001–2004	VVV	46	(1)
2005–2007	MVV	42	(5)
2007	Al Riffa		
2007–2013	Venray		
2013	RKSV Wittenhorst		
2014	ASV Süchteln	15	(0)
2014–2016	Union Nettetal	55	(12)
2016–2017	SV Straelen	22	(1)
- * Club domestic league appearances and goals

Tom van Bergen (born 9 September 1981) is a Dutch former professional footballer who played as a defender or midfielder.

== Career ==
Van Bergen started his career with Dutch second tier side VVV-Venlo, where he made 46 league appearances and scored 1 goal. On 19 April 2002, van Bergen debuted for VVV-Venlo during a 2–1 win over SC Cambuur. On 16 April 2004, he scored his first goal for VVV-Venlo during a 4–2 win over Go Ahead Eagles. In 2007, van Bergen signed for Al Riffa in Bahrain. After that, he signed for Dutch sixth-tier club SV Venray. In 2016, he signed for Union Nettetal in the German sixth tier.
