= Edwin van Bueren =

Dutch footballer

Personal information
- Date of birth: 4 April 1980 (age 46)
- Place of birth: Schiedam, Netherlands
- Height: 1.79 m (5 ft 10 in)
- Position: Midfielder

Youth career
- SVV/SMC

Senior career*
Years	Team	Apps	(Gls)
2002–2010	Sparta	154	(3)
2010–2011	Leonidas		
2012–2015	Zwaluwen Vlaardingen		
- * Club domestic league appearances and goals as of 18 May 2008

Edwin van Bueren (Dutch pronunciation: [ˈɛtʋɪɱ vɑm ˈbyːrə(n)]; born 4 April 1980) is a Dutch retired footballer who played professionally for Sparta Rotterdam.

== Club career ==
Van Bueren is a midfielder who was born in Schiedam and made his debut in professional football, being part of the Sparta Rotterdam squad in the 2002–03 season after joining them from amateurs SVV/SMC. After his release in summer 2010, van Bueren played for amateur clubs Leonidas and Zwaluwen Vlaardingen. In February 2015, Zwaluwen announced the release of van Bueren.

== Personal life ==
Nicknamed De Glazenwasser (The Window Cleaner) due to his former profession, van Bueren moved to Belgium to live with his partner Nathalie and their daughter in Peer. He also has a son and a daughter out of an earlier relationship.

== See also ==
- Sparta Rotterdam season 2002–03
- Sparta Rotterdam season 2003–04
