= Frank Kooiman =

Dutch association football player

Personal information
- Full name: Frank Kooiman
- Date of birth: 13 January 1970 (age 56)
- Place of birth: Vlaardingen, Netherlands
- Height: 1.84 m (6 ft 1/2 in)
- Position: Goalkeeper

Senior career*
Years	Team	Apps	(Gls)
1993–1996	Sparta Rotterdam	12	(0)
1996–1998	VVV-Venlo	67	(0)
1998–1999	FC Utrecht	33	(0)
1999–2002	Sparta Rotterdam	85	(0)
2002	PSV Eindhoven	2	(0)
2002–2006	Sparta Rotterdam	90	(0)
2006–2007	FC Dordrecht	33	(0)
- * Club domestic league appearances and goals as of 5 August 2009 ‡ National team caps and goals as of 9 July 2007

Frank Kooiman (born 13 January 1970) is a Dutch former football goalkeeper. He made his debut in Dutch professional football on 25 September 1994 for Sparta Rotterdam, replacing Edward Metgod in a game against Vitesse Arnhem.
