= Danny Schenkel =

Dutch footballer (born 1978)

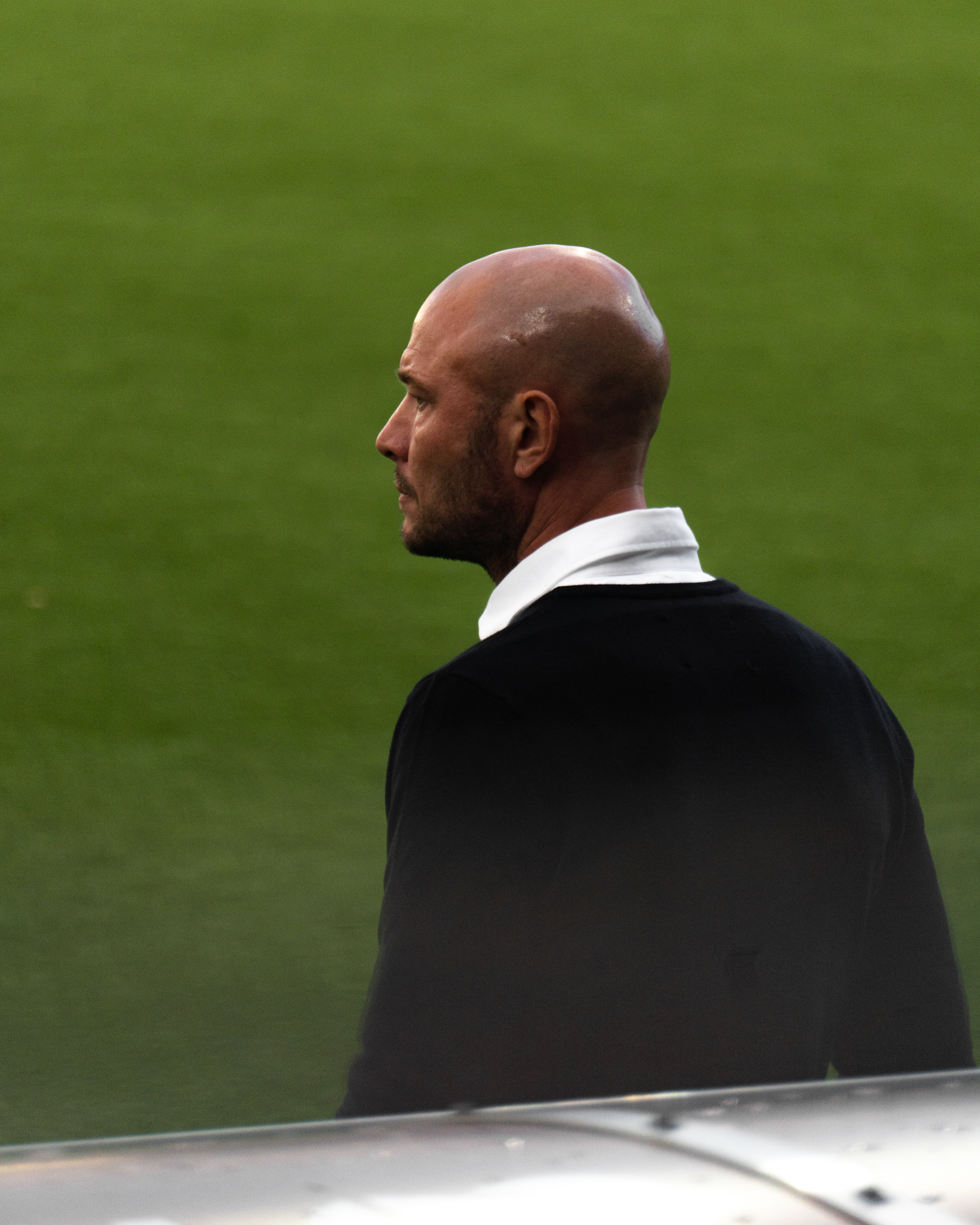

Personal information
- Date of birth: 1 April 1978 (age 48)
- Place of birth: Amsterdam, Netherlands
- Height: 1.93 m (6 ft 4 in)
- Position: Defender

Senior career*
Years	Team	Apps	(Gls)
1999–2002	Telstar	87	(3)
2002–2008	Sparta Rotterdam	150	(13)
2008–2010	Willem II	34	(0)
2010–2011	AEK Larnaca	28	(1)
2011–2012	Telstar	24	(1)
Total		323	(18)

Managerial career
- 2019–2022: Ajax Women
- * Club domestic league appearances and goals

Danny Schenkel (born 1 April 1978) is a Dutch former footballer and current manager.

== Playing career ==
Born in Amsterdam, Schenkel made his debut in professional football with the Telstar squad in the 1999–2000 season before joining Sparta Rotterdam in 2002. A tall and tough central defender, he had been a regular starter for them, scoring several mostly headed goals but also received the occasional red card.

For the 2008–09 season, he joined Willem II.

== Management career ==
In 2019 Schenkel became the coach of the Ajax women He wom the Dutch cup in 2022.

== Honours ==
=== Manager ===
Ajax

- KNVB Women's Cup 2021-2022
