= Sparta Stadion Het Kasteel =

Football stadium

Coordinates: 51°55′10″N 4°26′01″E

Sparta Stadion
- Het Kasteel
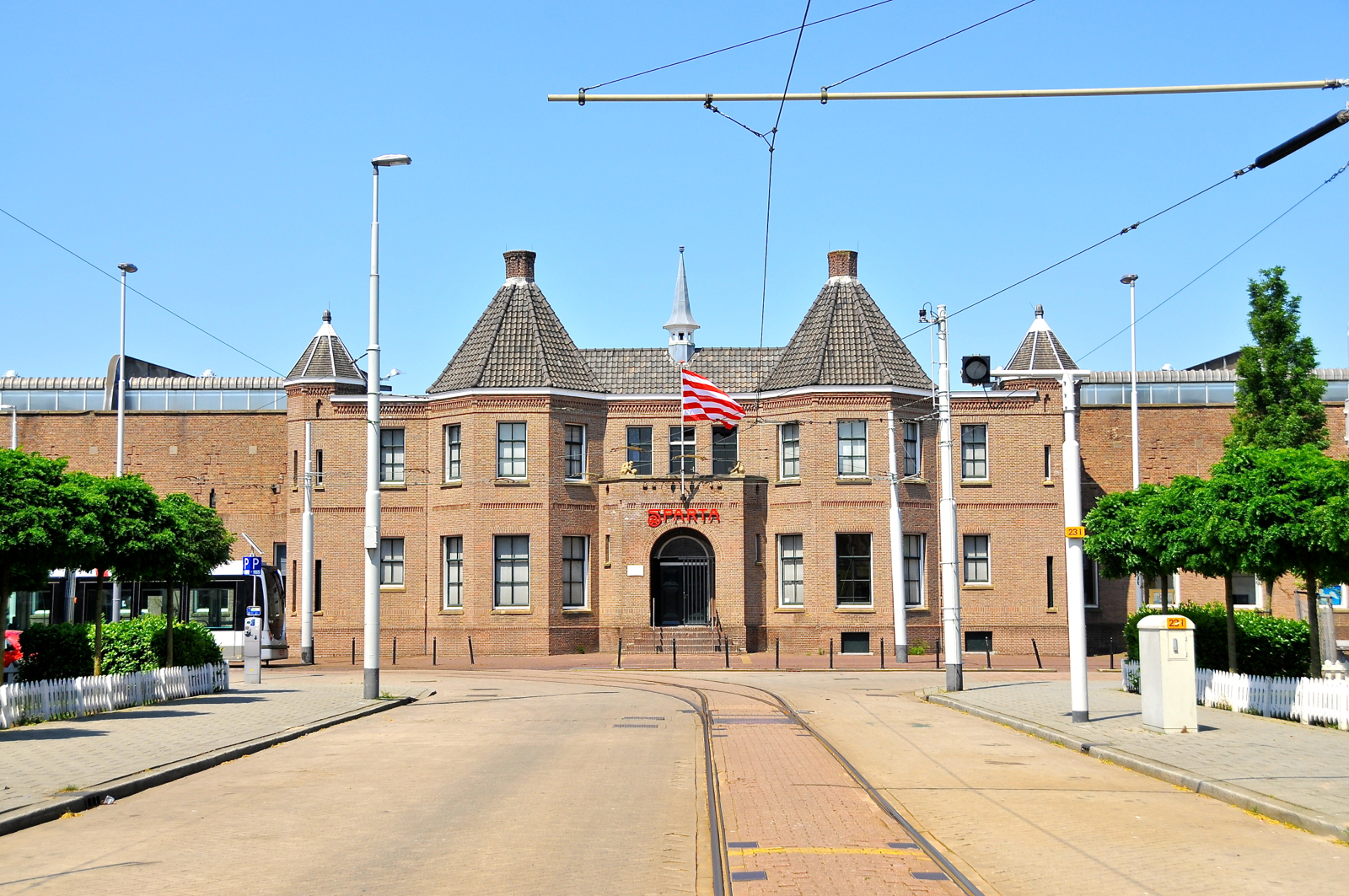
- Interactive map of Sparta Stadion
- Full name: Sparta Stadion
- Location: Rotterdam, Netherlands
- Capacity: 11,026

Construction
- Opened: 1916
- Renovated: 1999
- Architects: J.H. de Roos and W.F. Overeynder (1916); Zwarts & Jansma (1999)

Tenant
- Sparta Rotterdam

The Sparta Stadion, nicknamed Het Kasteel (Dutch pronunciation: [ət kɑsˈteːl]; "The Castle"), is a football stadium in Rotterdam, Netherlands. It is the home ground of Sparta Rotterdam. It has a capacity of 11,026.

== History and layout ==
The stadium is located in the neighbourhood of Spangen, where it was built in 1916 as Stadion Spangen based on a plan of the architects J.H. de Roos and W.F. Overeynder. The name "Het Kasteel" (The Castle) is derived from the small building with two towers which backs onto the south-facing Kasteel stand, which looks similar to a castle. This building is the only remainder of the original 1916 design. The castle building originally sat behind one of the goals, but ever since the pitch was rotated in 1999 it has sat along the south-eastern sideline.

A famous incident took place at het Kasteel in November 1970, when Feyenoord goalkeeper Eddy Treijtel took a goalkick and shot a passing seagull down from the air. The stuffed bird has been on display in the museum at Feyenoord's De Kuip stadion and not in Sparta's museum much to the annoyance of some prominent Sparta supporters.

=== 1928 Olympic Games ===
For the 1928 Summer Olympics in neighboring Amsterdam, the venue hosted two football games. The first was on 5 June when host nation Netherlands defeated Belgium 3-1 while the second was three days later when the Dutch team tied Chile 2–2.

Through the years, the stands of "Stadion Sparta" were often renovated and extended, but the most radical renovation took place in 1998 and 1999: the stadium was completely rebuilt according to a plan of the architects Zwarts & Jansma. During the renovation, the pitch was turned 90 degrees. At the same time, it was renamed ENECO-stadion, after its main sponsor. That name was soon replaced by the present Het Kasteel ("The Castle"), which had already been the popular nickname for the stadium ever since it was built.

The Castle was bought in November 2004 by businessman Hans van Heelsbergen, the manager of the textile company Hans Textiel and also the chairman of Sparta Rotterdam. Van Heelsbergen opened in this building a Sparta museum (and an outlet of Hans Textiel).

=== Tonny van Ede Stand ===
The Tonny van Ede stand is on the north side of the ground and stands along the length of the pitch, opposite the Kasteel Stand. The most expensive tickets are to be found here. It houses the changing rooms as well as the corporate boxes, the ticket office and the boardroom. The players' tunnel runs from the centre of this stand onto the pitch between the two dugouts. The stand was named after one of Sparta's most famous sons, Tonny van Ede, in 2010.

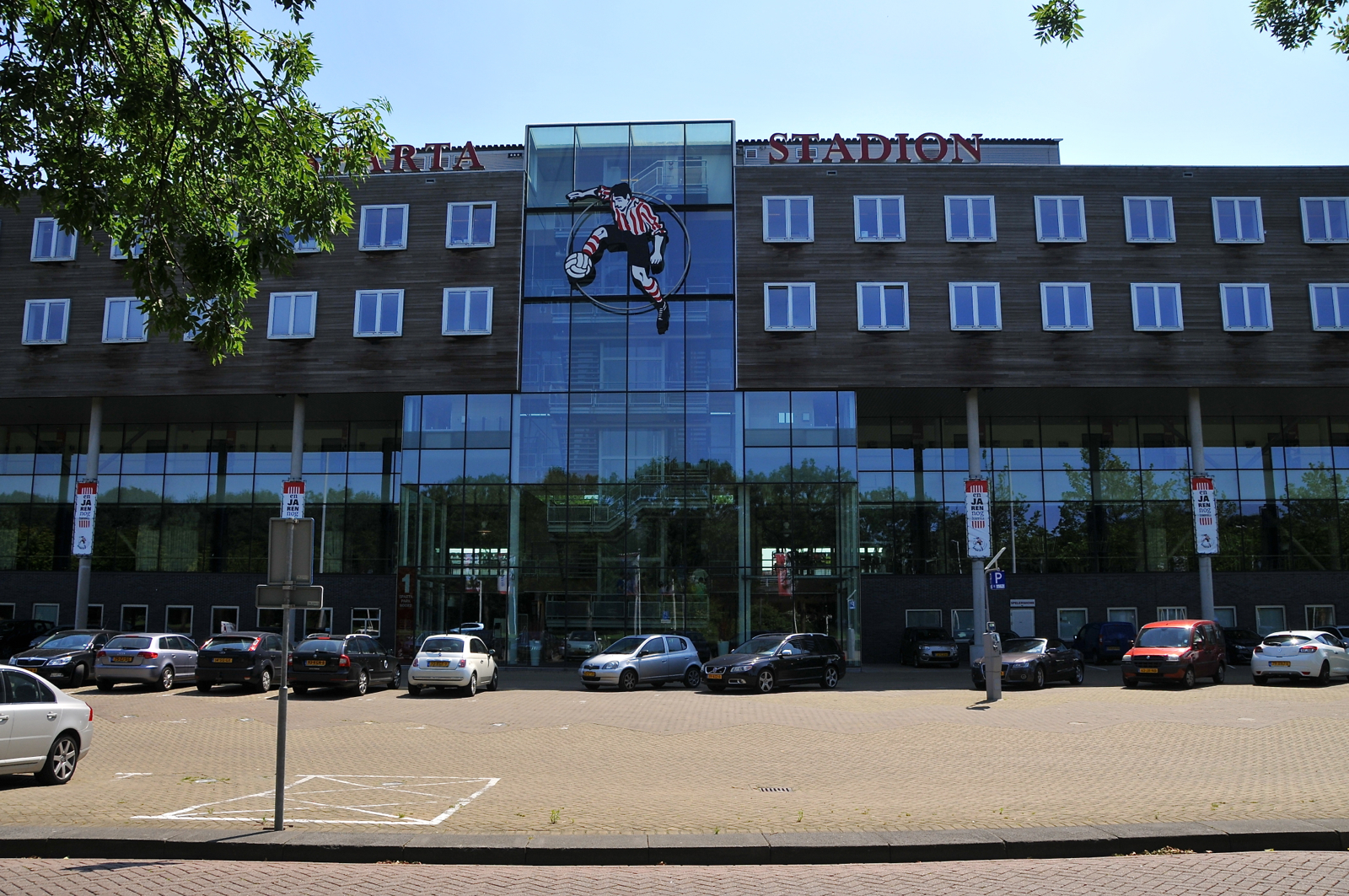
Main entrance at Tonny van Ede stand.

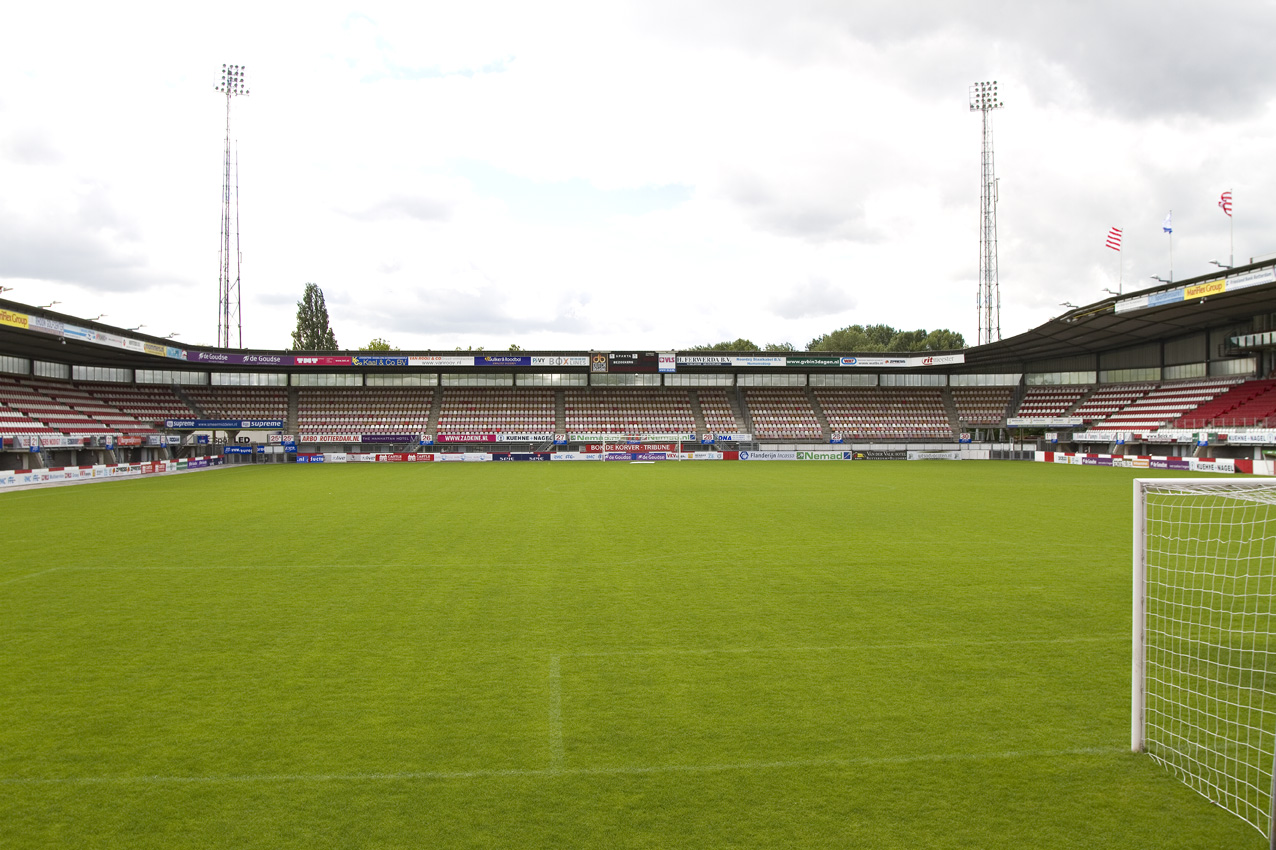
The interior of the stadium.

=== Denis Neville Stand ===
The lowest priced tickets for home fans are to be found in the Denis Neville Stand. This is at the east end of the ground behind one of the goals. It houses the more vocal supporters of the club and is usually the first stand to sell-out. The stand was named in honour of one of Sparta's most successful managers, Denis Neville.

=== Bok de Korver Stand ===
Opposite the Denis Neville Stand, the Bok de Korver Stand is assigned as the family stand but also houses the away fans. Formerly known as the West Stand, it was named after Sparta legend Bok de Korver.

=== Kasteel Stand ===
Attached to the historic Kasteel building, the Kasteel Stand is on the south end of the ground and the club shop is based here as well as the Sparta Museum.

== See also ==
- List of football stadiums in the Netherlands
- Lists of stadiums
