= Ricky van den Bergh =

Dutch footballer

Personal information
- Full name: Richard van den Bergh
- Date of birth: 17 November 1980 (age 45)
- Place of birth: The Hague, Netherlands
- Height: 1.76 m (5 ft 9 in)
- Positions: Winger; attacking midfielder; forward

Youth career
- 1998–1999: VCS
- 1999–2001: LenS
- 2001–2002: Kranenburg

Senior career*
Years	Team	Apps	(Gls)
2002–2006	Sparta	110	(54)
2006–2007	RKC	23	(5)
2007–2009	Heracles	52	(8)
2009–2010	ADO Den Haag	34	(3)
2010–2011	Sparta	13	(2)
2011–2013	Spakenburg	31	(12)
- * Club domestic league appearances and goals as of 16 March 2014 (UTC)

Richard van den Bergh (Dutch pronunciation: [ˈriɕɑrt ˈrɪki vɑn də(m) ˈbɛr(ə)x]; born 17 November 1980 in The Hague) is a Dutch former footballer.

== Club career ==
He previously played for Sparta Rotterdam (2002–2006), for whom he scored 54 goals in four seasons as well as RKC Waalwijk and Heracles Almelo.

=== ADO Den Haag ===
The hot-headed midfielder played for ADO Den Haag since the summer of 2009 in the Dutch highest league, Eredivisie. Van den Bergh is infamous for hitting the bar from free kicks. In his last season at Heracles Almelo, he hit the bar six times, after the first nine matches at ADO Den Haag he had already got three hits. On 5 April 2010 in the game against Ajax Amsterdam played since the 75 minute between the final whistle as goalkeeper, who replaced Barry Ditewig who was shown the red card in the 74th minute.

=== Sparta Rotterdam ===
On 8 December 2010 it was announced that Van den Bergh's contract with ADO Den Haag was terminated, because of a disagreement about his number of matches. On 14 December 2010 he signed with Sparta Rotterdam until the end of the season.
