= Monteiro (surname) =

Monteiro is an occupational Portuguese surname meaning 'hunter'. It is also found in former Portuguese colonies such as Brazil and Mangalore, India. Notable people with the surname include:

== People with the surname ==
=== A – D ===
- Aaron Monteiro (born 1997), American football player
- Adolfo Casais Monteiro (1908–1972), Portuguese essayist, poet and writer
- Alberto Monteiro (known as Fialho; 1928–2015), Portuguese footballer
- Aldo Geraldo Manuel Monteiro (known as Kadú; born 1994), Angolan footballer
- Alex Monteiro de Lima (known simply as Alex; born 1988), Brazilian footballer
- Allan Monteiro (1922–?), Pakistani boxer
- Allan Monteiro Dias (born 1988), Brazilian professional footballer
- Amarilson Monteiro (known as Xolote; born 1989), Cape Verdean professional footballer
- Ana Monteiro (born 1993), Portuguese swimmer
- Ananias Eloi Castro Monteiro (known simply as Ananias, 1989–2016), Brazilian footballer
- André Monteiro (known as Ukra; born 1988), Portuguese footballer who plays for S.C. Olhanense
- Antonio Monteiro (mathematician) (1907–1980), Portuguese mathematician
- António Augusto Carvalho Monteiro (1848–1920), Brazilian-Portuguese businessman, bibliophile, entomologist and Freemason
- Antônio Augusto Monteiro de Barros (1790–1841), Brazilian politician
- António da Silva Monteiro, 1st Count of Silva Monteiro (1822–1885), Portuguese nobleman
- António Isaac Monteiro, the foreign minister of Guinea-Bissau 2005–2007
- António Mascarenhas Monteiro (1944–2016), the President of Cape Verde (1991–2001)
- António Monteiro (politician) (born 1944), Portuguese politician
- António Monteiro (canoeist) (born 1972), Portuguese sprint canoeist
- Antônio Monteiro (actor) (born 1956), Brazilian actor, director and writer
- Antonio Monteiro (mathematician) (1907–1980), mathematician born in Portuguese Angola
- Antônio Monteiro Dutra (born 1973), Brazilian left back
- Antonio Pedro Monteiro Lima (born 1948), the Permanent Representative to the United Nations for Cape Verde since 2007
- Antônio Roberto Monteiro Simões, Brazilian-born linguist interested in the phonetics and phonology of the Romance languages
- António Wesllem de Sousa Monteiro (known as Wesllem; born 1985), Portuguese footballer
- Anjali Monteiro, documentary filmmaker, media educator and researcher who lives in Mumbai
- Armando Monteiro (politician) (born 1952), Brazilian politician and lawyer
- Armando Monteiro Filho (1925–2018), Brazilian businessman, engineer and politician
- Armindo Monteiro (1896–1955), Portuguese university professor, businessman, diplomat and politician
- Beatriz Monteiro (actress) (born 1999), Portuguese actress
- Bernardino de Sousa Monteiro (1865–1930), Brazilian politician
- Beto Monteiro (born 1975), Brazilian racing driver
- Bruno António Monteiro Magalhães (born 1982), Portuguese professional footballer
- Bruno Monteiro (born 1984), Portuguese footballer who currently plays for Vitória FC
- Caio Monteiro (known as Caio Monteiro; born 1997), Brazilian footballer
- Caralisa Monteiro, Indian singer
- Casimiro Monteiro (1920–1993), Portuguese PIDE agent
- Carlos Monteiro (runner) (born 1965), Portuguese long-distance runner
- Charles Monteiro (born 1994), São Toméan footballer
- Chico Monteiro (1918–1990), Indian Roman Catholic Bishop of Goa
- Cláudia Monteiro, Brazilian professional tennis player
- Cléber Monteiro (born 1980), Brazilian footballer currently playing for C.D. Nacional
- Cristina Lopes da Silva Monteiro Duarte (born 1962), Capeverdean politician
- Daniel Feitosa de Araújo Monteiro (born 1992), Brazilian futsal player
- Danilo Monteiro Martins (born 1998), Brazilian professional basketball
- Darci Miguel Monteiro (known simply as Darci; 1968–2018), Brazilian professional footballer
- Dário Monteiro (born 1977), Mozambican footballer who plays for Supersport United FC
- Danielson Gomes Monteiro (born 1986), Romanian football player
- Darci Miguel Monteiro (born 1968), retired Brazilian professional footballer
- Diogo Filipe Monteiro Pinto Leite (born 1999), Portuguese professional footballer
- Dóris Monteiro (1934–2023), Brazilian singer and actress

=== E – H ===
- Éder Monteiro Fernandes (known simply as Éder; born 1983), Brazilian professional footballer
- Edivaldo Monteiro (born 1976), Portuguese hurdler
- Eduardo Monteiro (born 1966), Brazilian concert pianist, university professor and piano teacher
- Elton Monteiro (born 1994), Portuguese footballer of Cape Verdean descent
- Elvis Manuel Monteiro Macedo (known simply as Babanco; born 1985), Cape Verdean professional footballer
- Ernest Steven Monteiro (1904–1989), physician in preventive medicine and Singapore's ambassador to Cambodia
- Eurídice Monteiro, Cape Verdean politician and Secretary of State for Higher Education from 2021 to 2025
- Felipe Augusto de Almeida Monteiro (known simply as Felipe; born 1989), Brazilian professional footballer
- Felipe Monteiro Diogo (known as Sodinha; born 1988), Brazilian professional footballer
- Fernando Monteiro de Castro Soromenho (1910–1968), Portuguese journalist and writer
- Fernando Monteiro do Amaral (1925–2009), Portuguese politician and parliamentary
- Firmino Monteiro (1855–1888), Afro-Brazilian painter
- Flavia Monteiro Colgan (born 1977), Brazilian-American Democratic strategist
- Francisco Caetano Monteiro de Assis (also known as Kikas; born 1981), Angolan football player
- Francisco Monteiro (1926–2002), Hong Kong swimmer
- Francisca Maria Monteiro e Silva Vaz (known as Zinha Vaz; born 1952), Bissau-Guinean women's rights activist and politician
- Gabriel Monteiro Vasconcelos (born 1996), Brazilian footballer
- Gabryel Monteiro de Andrade (known as Gabryel the Destroyer; born 1999), Brazilian footballer
- Gerson Monteiro (born 1973), Angolan professional basketball player
- Gilson Monteiro Varela da Silva (known simply as Gilson; born 1990), Cape Verdean football player
- Hélder Prista Monteiro (1922–1994), Portuguese playwright and writer
- Hugo Monteiro (born 1985), Portuguese professional footballer
- Ivan Monteiro (born 1960), Brazilian electronic engineer
- Júnior Monteiro (born 1991), Cape Verdean professional footballer
- Giselli Monteiro (born 1988), Brazilian model and Bollywood actress
- Henrique Monteiro Correia da Silva (known as Henrique Paço d'Arcos; 1878–1935), Portuguese statesman, navy officer and colonial administrator
- Hugo Monteiro (born 1985), Portuguese footballer, who currently plays for Gil Vicente F.C.

=== I – L ===
- Inês Monteiro (born 1980), Portuguese athlete who competes in middle and long-distance track running
- Isabel Monteiro, the London-based, singer-songwriter and bassist with three-piece alternative band Drugstore
- Ivi Monteiro (born 1984), Brazilian butterfly and freestyle swimmer
- Jamiro Monteiro (commonly known as Jamiro; born 1993), Cape Verdean professional footballer
- Jerônimo de Sousa Monteiro (1870–1933), Brazilian politician
- Jeremy Monteiro (born 1960), Singaporean jazz musician
- Jerson Monteiro (born 1985), professional soccer player
- João César Monteiro, Portuguese film director, actor, writer and film critic
- João Monteiro, Portuguese table tennis player
- Joceline Monteiro (born 1990), Portuguese runner
- Joel de Oliveira Monteiro (1904–1990), Brazilian football player
- Johnson Monteiro Pinto Macaba (born 1978), Angolan football striker, who plays for Chengdu Blades in the China League One
- Johnny Monteiro (born 1938), Hong Kong field hockey player
- Jorge Fernandes Monteiro (known as Jotamont; 1912–1998), Cape Verdean musician and composer
- Jorge Monteiro (born 1988), known as Monteiro, Portuguese footballer
- José Luís Monteiro (1848–1942), Portuguese architect
- José Hipólito Monteiro (born 1939), Portuguese geologist and oceanographer
- José Monteiro (footballer) (born 1982), Guinea-Bissauan footballer
- José Monteiro (athlete), Portuguese Paralympian athlete
- José Monteiro (volleyball) (born 1991), Portuguese male volleyball player
- José Pedro Monteiro (born 1959), Portuguese windsurfer
- José Sabino Chagas Monteiro (born 1996), known as Sabino, Brazilian footballer
- Leonardo Sierra Monteiro (born 1987), Brazilian actor, engineer and entrepreneur
- Kelvin Monteiro Medina (born 1994), Cape Verdean professional footballer
- Lucas Monteiro (born 2001), Swiss footballer
- Luís de Matos Monteiro da Fonseca (born 1944), Cape Verdean diplomat and civil servant
- Luís de Sttau Monteiro (1926–1993), Portuguese writer, novelist and playwright
- Luís Monteiro (swimmer) (born 1983), Portuguese former swimmer
- Luis Pedro Barros Barny Monteiro (born 1966), known as Barny, Portuguese footballer
- Luiza Monteiro, Brazilian jiu-jitsu (BJJ) competitor
- Lumen Monteiro (born 1952), Indian Roman Catholic bishop
- Lurdes Monteiro (born 1984), Angolan handball player

=== M – Q ===
- Manuel Monteiro (born 1962), Portuguese jurist, professor and former politician
- Manuel Monteiro de Castro (born 1938), secretary of the Congregation for Bishops appointed by Pope Benedict XVI in 2009
- Manuel Rui Alves Monteiro (born 1941), Angolan writer of poetry, novels, theater plays, and short stories
- Marco Monteiro (born 1966), Brazilian gymnast
- Marcos Felipe de Freitas Monteiro (known simply as Marcos Felipe; born 1996), Brazilian professional footballer
- Maria do Céu Monteiro, President of the Supreme Court of Guinea-Bissau and also of the ECOWAS Court since 2012
- Maria Monteiro Jardin, former Angolan minister for fisheries
- Marilyn J. Monteiro, psychologist specialized in the spectrum of autism disorder
- Miguel Monteiro, (born 1980), Portuguese footballer currently playing with Valencia CF
- Monteiro Lobato (1882–1948), one of Brazil's most influential writers, mostly for his children's books
- Monteiro da Costa (born 1928), Portuguese footballer
- Noah Monteiro (born 2009), Portuguese racing driver
- Nélson Monteiro de Souza (known simply as Nélson Monteiro; 1904–?), Brazilian basketball player
- Nicholas Monteiro (born 2005), Brazilian racing driver
- Nuno Miguel Monteiro Rocha (born 1992), Cape Verdean professional footballer
- Otávio Edmilson da Silva Monteiro (also known as Otávio or Otavinho; born 1995), Brazilian professional footballer
- Osvaldo Monteiro (born 1963), Brazilian football manager and former player
- Paulo Monteiro (artist) (born 1961), Brazilian artist
- Paulo Monteiro (footballer, born 1985), Portuguese footballer
- Pedro Aurélio de Góis Monteiro (born 1889), Brazilian general and politician
- Pedro Miguel Cardoso Monteiro (known as Pelé; born 1978), Cape Verdean footballer
- Pedro Monteiro (footballer) (born 1994), Portuguese footballer
- Pedro Monteiro (swimmer) (born 1975), butterfly swimmer from Brazil

=== R – U ===
- Rafael Monteiro Alves da Silva( known as Rafael Silva; born 1984), Brazilian footballer
- Rafael Pires Monteiro (known simply as Rafael; born 1989), Brazilian footballer
- Raimundo Monteiro (born 1957), Brazilian politician
- Regilson Saboya Monteiro Júnior (known as Juninho Cearense; born 1980), Brazilian footballer
- Ricardo José Vaz Alves Monteiro (born 1983), Portuguese footballer who plays for Rio Ave FC
- Roberto Monteiro (also known as Roberto Batata; 1949–1976), Brazilian association football forward
- Roberto Leal Monteiro, Home Affairs Minister of Angola
- Ronaldo Monteiro (born 1998), Bolivian football player
- Rose Monteiro (née Bassett) (1840–1898), English plant collector and naturalist
- Rubenilson Monteiro Ferreira (born 1972), Brazilian football player
- Rudy Monteiro (born 1996), Cape Verdean footballer
- Rui Monteiro (footballer, born 1977), retired Dutch football striker
- Rui Manuel Monteiro Silva (born 1977), Portuguese track and field athlete and coach
- Rui Monteiro (footballer, born 1977), Cape Verdean retired professional football player
- Rui Monteiro (footballer, born 1991), Portuguese footballer
- Ruth Monteiro, Bissau-Guinean lawyer
- Sanny Monteiro (born 1989), Dutch professional footballer
- Santinho Lopes Monteiro (born 1979), Cape Verdean-Dutch football player
- Sergio Monteiro (born 1974), Brazilian pianist
- Sergio Manuel Monteiro Semedo (born 1988), Cape Verdean professional footballer
- Sonal Monteiro, Indian film actress
- Tariq Monteiro (born 2000), British drill rapper and convicted murderer.
- Telma Monteiro (born 1985), Portuguese judoka from the city of Almada
- Thales Monteiro (1925–1993), Brazilian basketball player
- Tiago Monteiro (born 1976), racing driver who drove for Jordan, Midland and Spyker MF1 Racing Formula One teams
- Tiago Miguel Monteiro de Almeida (born 1990), Cape Verdean professional footballer
- Thiago Monteiro (tennis) (born 1994), Brazilian tennis player
- Tomás Antônio Maciel Monteiro, 1st Baron of Itamaracá (1780–1847), Brazilian politician and magistrate
- Valéria Monteiro (born 1965), Brazilian journalist, model, actress, and television presenter

=== V – Z ===
- Vandré Sagrilo Monteiro (born 1979), Brazilian footballer
- Vicente do Rego Monteiro (1899–1970), Brazilian painter
- Wallyson Ricardo Maciel Monteiro (born 1988), Brazilian footballer
- Wanderley Santos Monteiro Júnior (also known as Wanderley; born 1988), Brazilian footballer
- Wania Monteiro (born 1986), Cape Verdean rhythmic gymnast
- Wellington Monteiro (born 1978), defensive midfielder player from Brazil

== See also ==
- Montero (name)
