= José Monteiro =

José Monteiro may refer to:

- José Monteiro (athlete), Portuguese Paralympic athlete
- José Monteiro (footballer) (born 1982), Guinea-Bissauan footballer
- José Monteiro (volleyball) (born 1991), Portuguese volleyball player
- José Filomeno Monteiro (1955–2025), Cape Verde diplomat and politician
- José Hipólito Monteiro (born 1939), Portuguese marine geologist
- José Luís Monteiro (1848–1942), Portuguese architect
- José Pedro Monteiro (born 1959), Portuguese Olympic windsurfer
