= Chinesas dos Bichos =

Two Chinese folk healers involved in controversy in Portugal

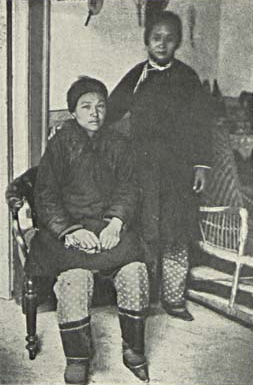
Ajus and Joé, photographed by Joshua Benoliel in 1911

"Chinesas dos Bichos" (Note: At the time, the standard spelling would be Chinezas dos Bichos.) (literally, "The Chinese Women of the Worms") was the name by which two folk healers from Shanghai, called Ajus and Joé, became known after being the protagonists of tremendous controversy in Portugal, in late 1911.

== History ==
Ajus and Joé established themselves in Hotel Algarve in Rua da Padaria (Bakery Street), in the lower district of Lisbon, in November 1911. There, they started seeing ophthalmic patients that they treated, by all accounts, "by extracting maggots, like the ones found inside fruits, from their eyes". The putative treatment the Chinese women offered consisted of, after applying a few drops of a certain liquid, massaging the patients' foreheads with "two little wooden sticks", after which they extracted "worms" from the patients' eyes (later on, it was verified following a microscopic examination, that these "worms" were housefly larvae – that the civil government authorities claimed were put there by the Chinese women themselves, by sleight of hand).

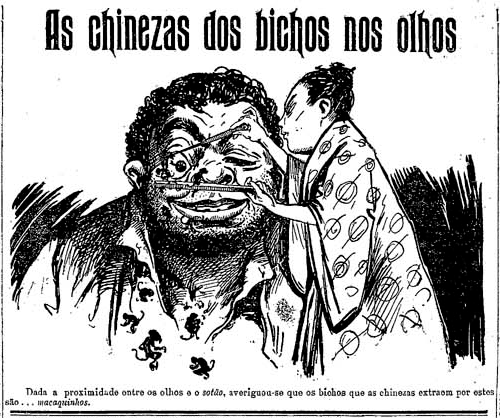
A cartoon depicting the Chinese women extracting creatures from Zé Povinho's eyes (A Capital, 20 November 1911)

Several people attested having regained their vision after being treated by the "miraculous Chinese women", and these testimonies drag crowds to the Chinese women, in hopes they would heal their eye afflictions. Meanwhile, the authorities intervened: the civil governor of Lisbon, Eusébio Leão (himself a physician by training), forbids the healers from seeing patients, alleging unauthorized practice of medicine. When confronted with favourable patients' testimony he says, in an interview to the newspaper A Capital, that it is all a matter of gullibility and the power of suggestion, and alerts to the unsanitary nature of the healers' procedures: "I feel a great commiseration for all those unfortunate people who, in their eagerness for a cure or even any degree of recovery, risk everything, make the greatest sacrifices, and believe in the miracles with which creatures of no scruples try to take advantage of them; but the duty of all of us, who are aware of the ignoble exploitation, is to defend them even against themselves, avoiding not only said exploitation but the dangers it entails."

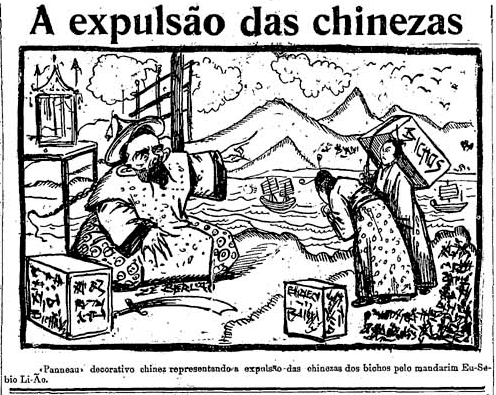
"Decorative "panneau" from China depicting the expulsion of the Chinesas dos Bichos by the Mandarin Eu-Sé-bio Li-Ão" (A Capital, 25 November 1911)

This generated a great protest movement, with several people petitioning the President, Parliament, the Ministry of the Interior and the civil government to uphold the rights of the Chinese women. As all this was to no avail, and the healers were still forbidden to see patients, popular discontent grew and, in the morning hours of 25 November, the police stormed Hotel Algarve to escort the Chinese women out of the country: they were taken to Vila Franca de Xira, where they were put in a 2nd class carriage of the train to Badajoz, Spain, under escort by four guards.

Following this move, the popular protests become more violent and take up the streets. On 26 November, a commission composed of António Bellá, Constantino Mendes, Gaspar da Silva, Manuel Augusto Ferreira, Júlio Cruz, José da Veiga, Armando Almeida, and José Candeias, organises a public rally against the deportation of the Chinesas dos Bichos, by the Anjos Church. Impassioned speeches were made: about it being a "protest against all those who just want to make money, no matter the results", crying for "justice to be made, and respect for the foreigners", that "the Constitution was flouted when the police entered the home of respected citizens", that ophthalmologists had colluded to get rid of the Chinese women, and attacking Eusébio Leão "as a physician, as civil governor, and chiefly as a Republican". The crowd then gathered at the Rotunda, where further speeches were made; from there, they marched down Avenida da Liberdade towards the seat of the Civil Government, in the Chiado neighbourhood. As Eusébio Leão was not there, the crowd split: one part went to the main offices of the newspaper A Lucta where they demonstrated against Brito Camacho, a member of Parliament who had dismissed the case as "a simple matter for the police" (due to the proximity of the residence of President Arriaga – at the time, Horta Seca Palace – infantry and cavalry units of the National Republican Guard had to secure the building), the others filled Rossio Square, where "improvised speakers inflamed passersby, going from the Chinese women to current politics, and were met with applause and hurrays". António Machado Santos, the hero of the Republican Revolution just one year prior, tried to calm down the crowd, but was forced to take refuge in a shop, under gun fire, and only managed to leave in an automobile after the National Republican Guard arrived.

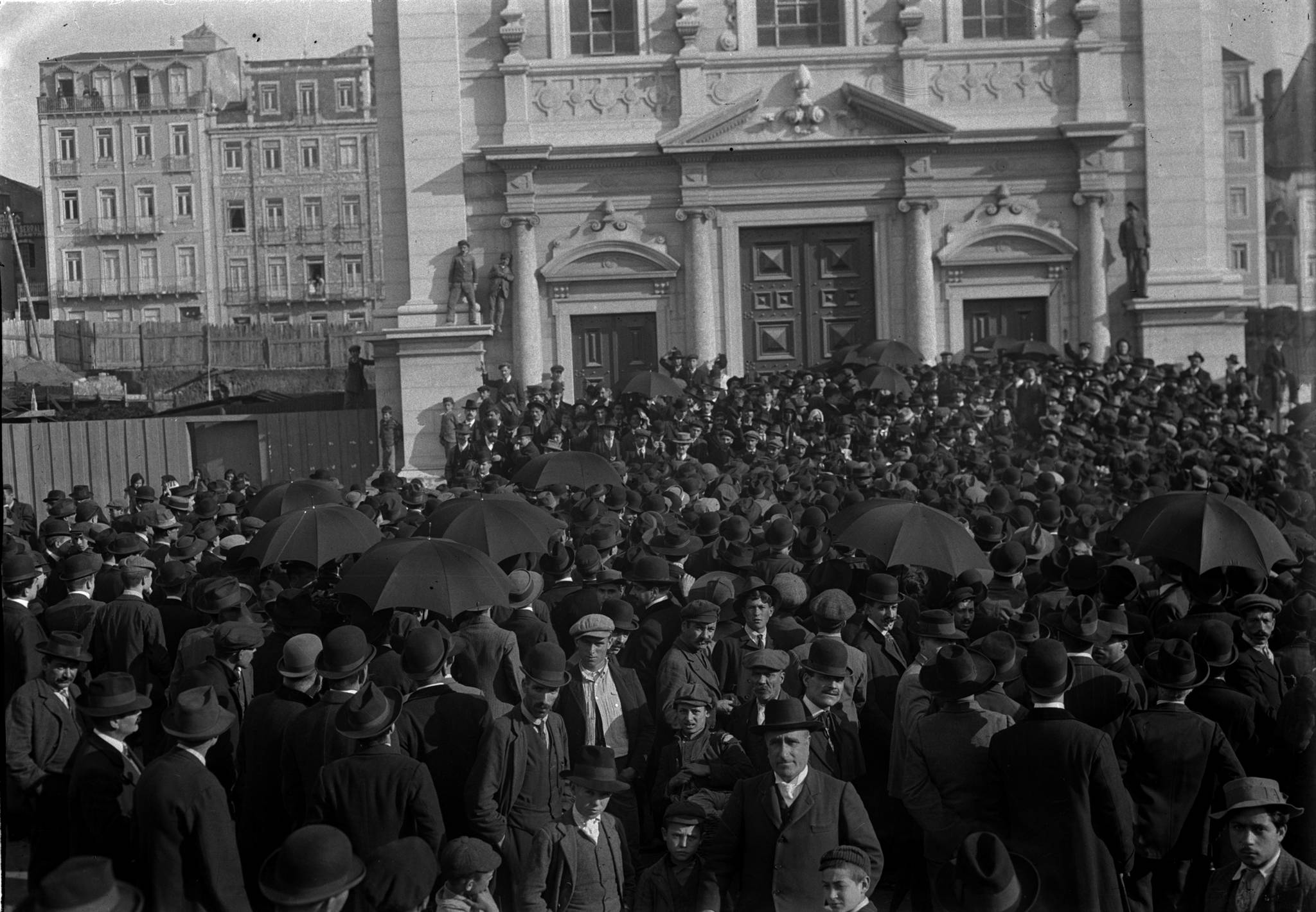
Crowd in front of the Anjos Church, on 26 November 1911

The exchange of fire between the Guard and the crowd produced 46 injured, 1 casualty (milliner José da Costa, aged 20, who died on the morning of 27 November in São José Hospital after being shot twice on the chest), and several arrests.

The following day, 27 November 1911, the incidents were discussed at length in Parliament: Machado Santos, who had been one of those assaulted, attributed the disturbances of the public order to "troublemakers and professional hecklers", as did António Granjo. Others saw in the events a symptom of the people's disenchantment with the new Republican regime, as belief and support of quackery was very much at odds with the positivist and secularist values that it espoused.
