= Montero =

Montero may refer to:

- Montero (name), a list of people with the name

== Music ==
- Montero Lamar Hill (born 1999), known as Lil Nas X, American rapper and singer-songwriter
  - Montero (album), a 2021 album by Lil Nas X
  - "Montero (Call Me by Your Name)", a 2021 song by Lil Nas X

== Places ==
- Montero, Bolivia, a city and a municipality in Santa Cruz, Bolivia
- Montero District, one of ten districts of Ayabaca, Peru
- Montero Hoyos, a town in Santa Cruz, Bolivia

== Vehicles ==
- Mitsubishi Montero, a 1981–2021 Japanese full-size SUV
- Mitsubishi Montero iO, a 1998–2014 Japanese mini SUV
- Mitsubishi Montero Sport, a 1996–present Japanese mid-size SUV
- BAP Montero (FM-53), a frigate of the Peruvian Navy

== Other uses ==
- Montero Cap, a Spanish hat once used by hunters

== See also ==
- Monteros, a town in Argentina
- Monteiro (disambiguation)
- Mantero, an Argentinian term for a hawker
