= Rui Monteiro =

Rui Monteiro may refer to:

- Rui Monteiro (footballer, born 1977), Cape Verdean footballer
- Rui Monteiro (footballer, born 1991), Portuguese footballer
