= Rafael da Silva =

Rafael da Silva may refer to:

== Footballers ==
- Rafael Silva (footballer, born 1984), Brazilian football defender
- Rafael (footballer, born 1990), full name Rafael Pereira da Silva, Brazilian football right-back, playing for Botafogo
- Rafael Silva (footballer, born 1990), Brazilian football forward, playing for Madura United
- Rafael Silva (footballer, born 1992), Brazilian football forward, playing for Wuhan Zall
- Rafael Silva (footballer, born 1995), Brazilian football forward, playing for Vila Nova
- Rafael Silva (footballer, born 1999), Brazilian football midfielder
- Rafael Silva (footballer, born 2003), Brazilian football centre-back, playing for Sporting CP and known as Rafael Pontelo

== Others ==
- Rafael Silva (cyclist) (born 1990), Portuguese cyclist
- Rafael Silva (fighter), Brazilian MMA fighter
- Rafael Silva (judoka), Brazilian judoka
- Rafael Silva Lastra (1894–1988), Chilean politician
- Rafael L. Silva, Brazilian-American actor
