= La Voz Argentina season 2 =

La Voz Argentina
- Season 2
- Hosted by: Marley; Candelaria Molfese (Digital host)
- Coaches: Axel; Soledad Pastorutti; Tini Stoessel; Ricardo Montaner
- Winner: Braulio Assanelli
- Runner-up: Lucas Belbruno

Release
- Original network: Telefe
- Original release: 1 October – 16 December 2018

Season chronology
- ← Previous; Season 1 Next → Season 3

The second season of La Voz... Argentina premiered on 1 October 2018, on Telefe. Marley reprised his role as the host of the show, while actress Candelaria Molfese became the digital host.

Auditions for the show took place from May to July in the cities of Buenos Aires, Córdoba, Rosario, Mendoza, Mar del Plata, Salta and Corrientes. Unlike the previous season, online auditions were not accepted.

This was the second Latin American version in The Voice franchise, after the Mexican version, La Voz... México.

== Coaches and presenters ==
Series 2 judges

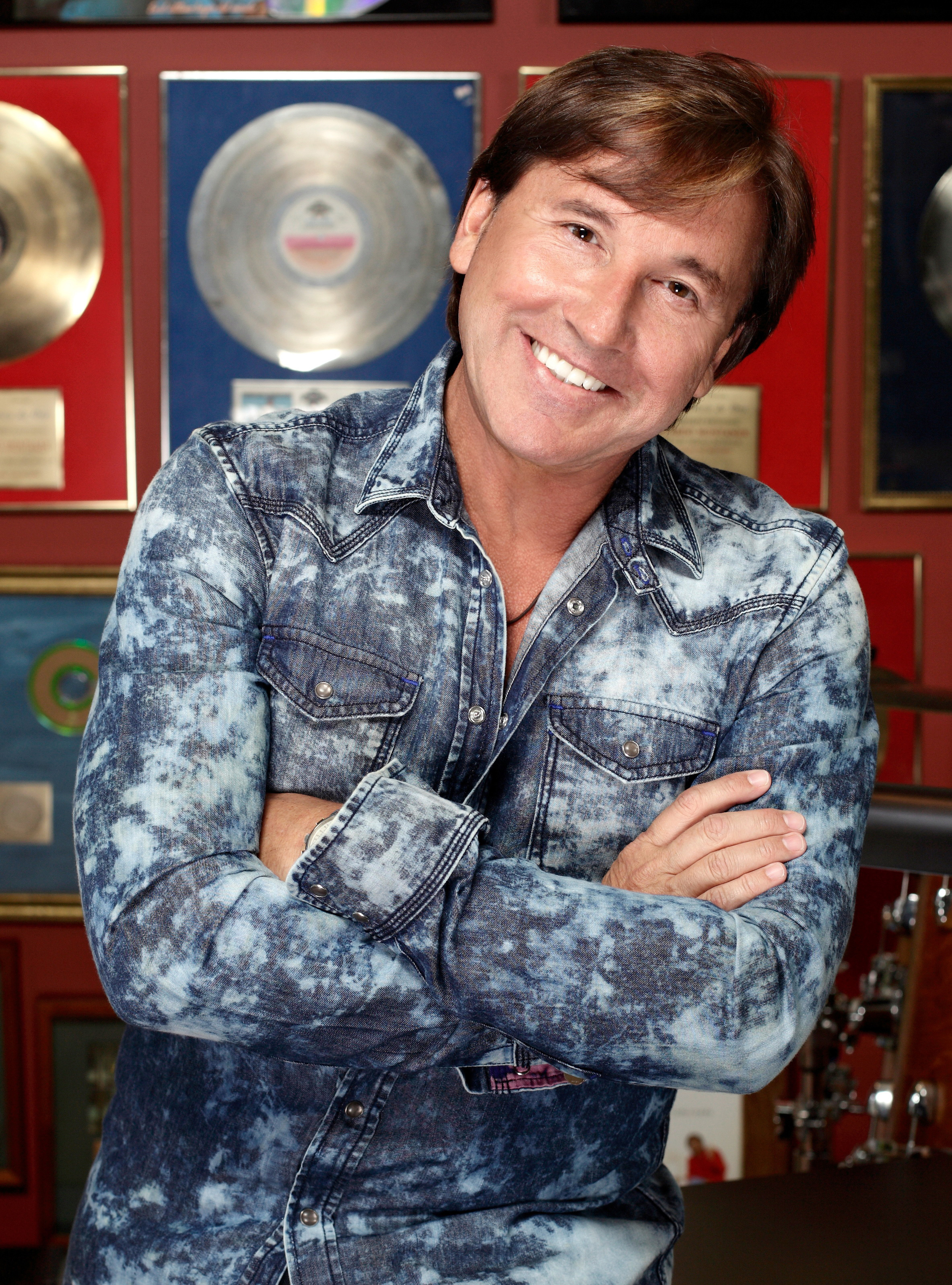
Montaner

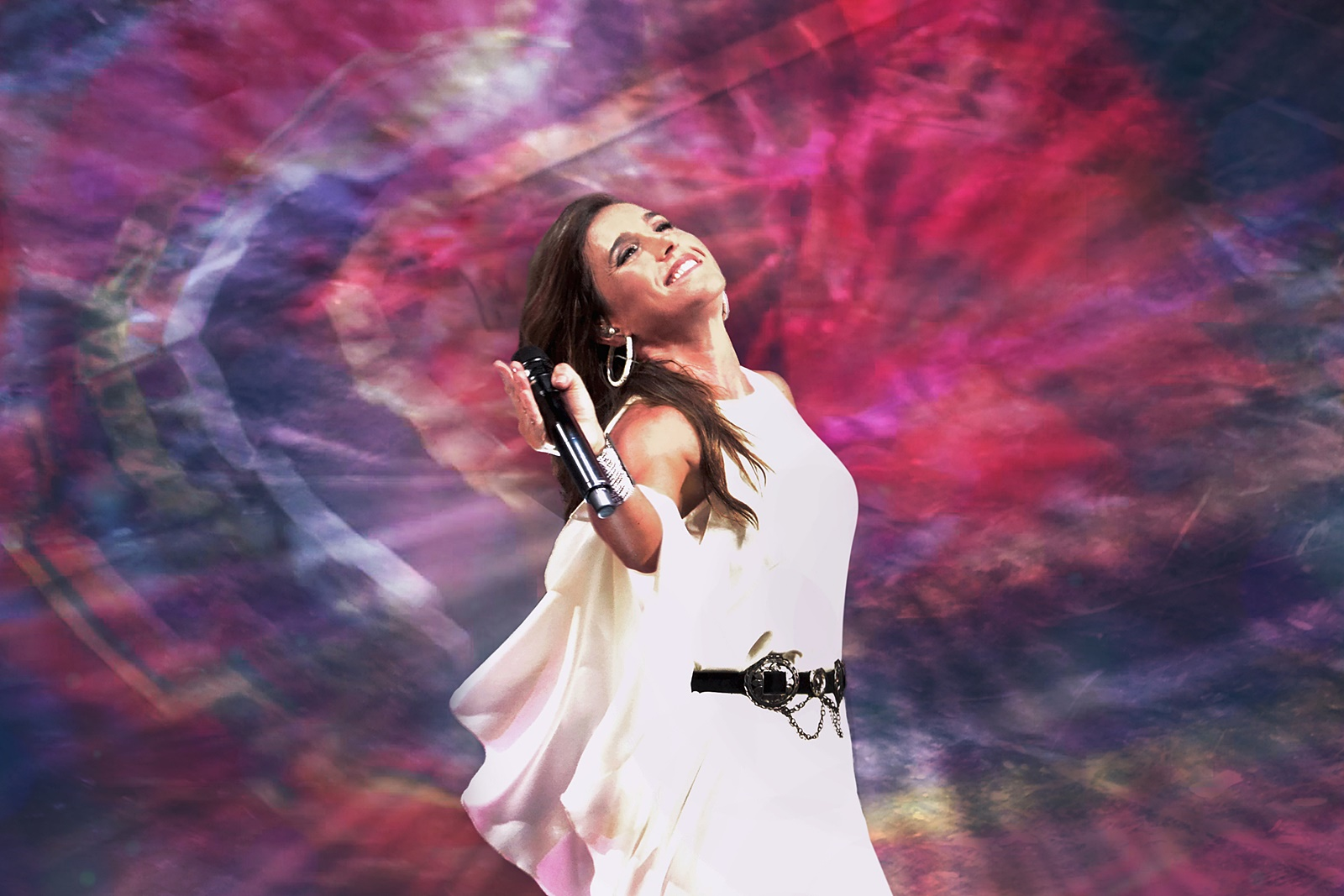
Soledad Pastorutti

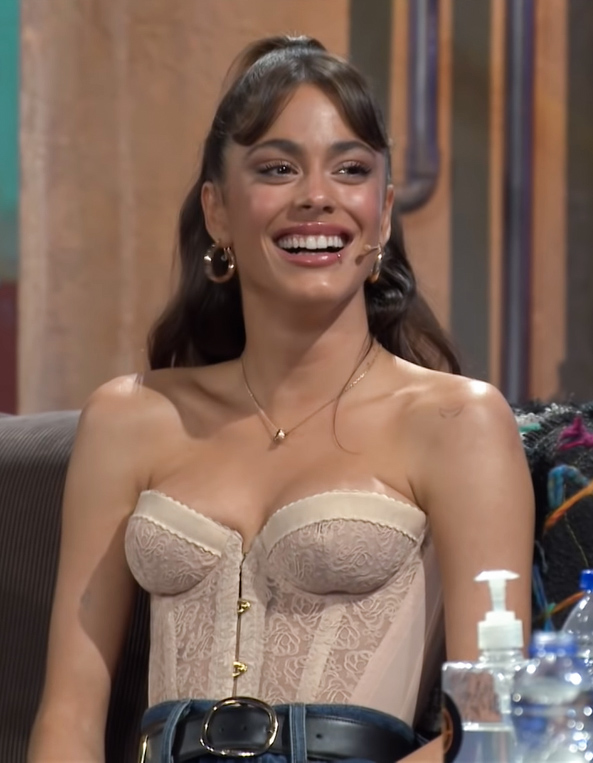
Tini Stoessel

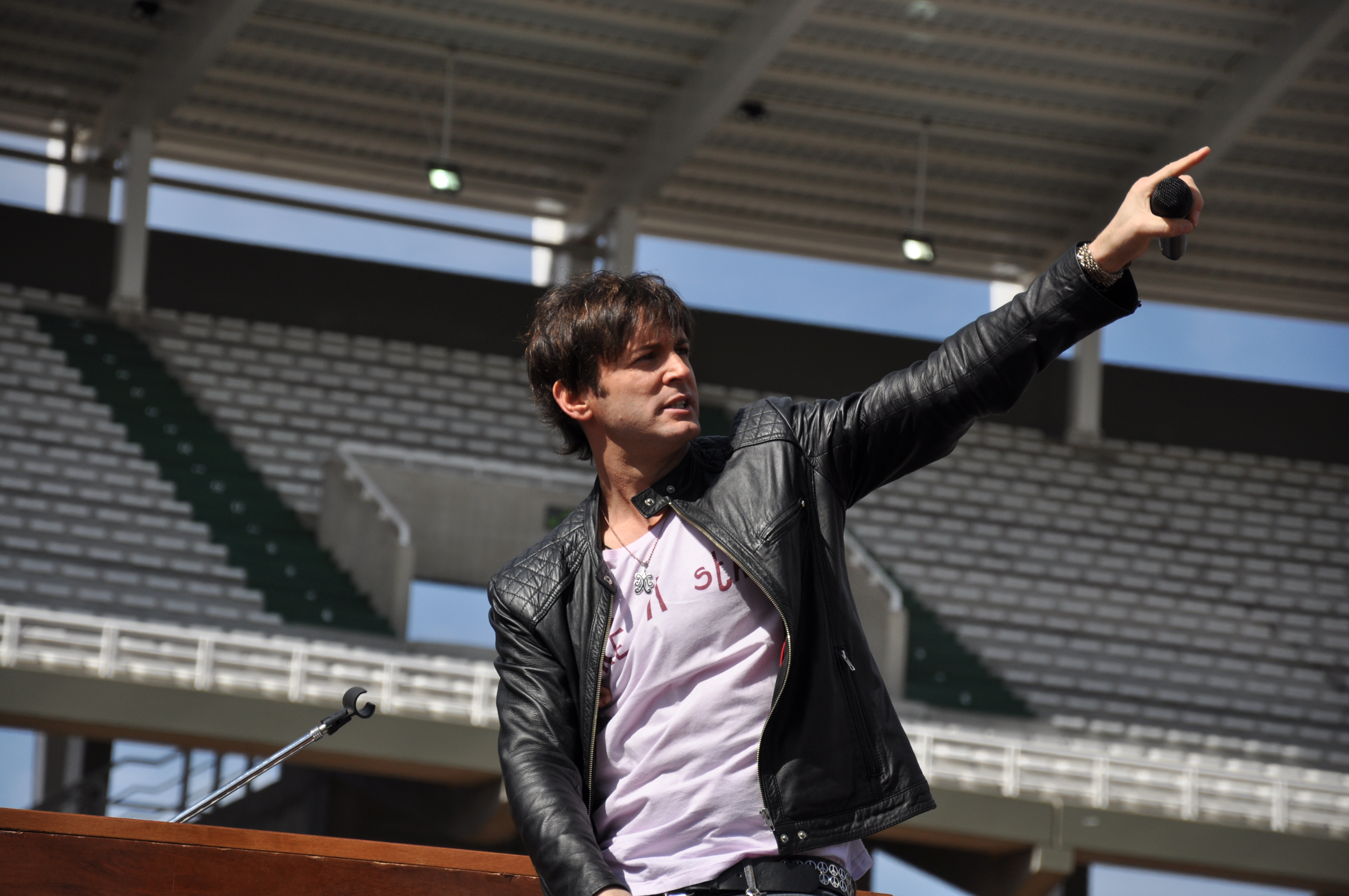
Axel

As in the previous season, that took place in 2012, Marley became the host of the show. This season introduced actress and singer Candelaria Molfese as the digital host of the show. This is the second time that Marley hosts a singing competition, after hosting the Argentine version of Operación Triunfo, for 4 seasons.

There was a lot of speculation about the coaches for the new season. Returning coaches from the first season were the Latin pop singer Axel and folk singer Soledad Pastorutti. New coaches were confirmed to be pop singer Tini Stoessel and Venezuelan-Argentine singer and songwriter Ricardo Montaner.

== Teams ==
Color key

- Winner
- Runner-up
- Third place
- Fourth place
- Eliminated in the Live shows
- Eliminated in the Playoffs
- Eliminated in the Knockouts
- Stolen in the Battle rounds
- Eliminated in the Battles

Coaches	Top 80 artists				
Ricardo Montaner					
Ricardo Montaner	Braulio Assanelli	Mario Virulón	**Pablo Carrasco**	Irvin Escobar Díaz	Lucas Catsoulieris
Ricardo Montaner	Paula Torres	Tomás Maldonado	Yanina Galeasi	~~Darío Lazarte~~	~~Juan Pablo Nieves~~
Ricardo Montaner	~~Manuela Bas~~	Adalí Montero	Guadalupe Espeja	Abigail Acosta	Alejo Duenas
Ricardo Montaner	Diego Marquez	Gianfranco Nanni	Isaias Dodds	Jacinta Travaglini	Lucía Capua
Ricardo Montaner	Lucía Spaccasassi	María Victoria Silva			
Soledad Pastorutti					
Soledad Pastorutti	Lucas Belbruno	Darío Lazarte	**Dúo Salteño**	Sofía Morales	Agostina Rosales
Soledad Pastorutti	Agustín Vega	Alejandro Escobar	Natalia Lara	~~Aymara Aybar~~	~~Jonathan Bisotto~~
Soledad Pastorutti	Esther Carpintero	Diego Iturbide	Juan Martínez Pott	Agustín Juárez	Celeste Dondero
Soledad Pastorutti	Diego Aramburu	Dúo Mamonde	Giovanna Nicola	Javier Lara	Jimena Díaz
Soledad Pastorutti	Victoria Arcay	Victoria Goldaracena			
Tini Stoessel					
Tini Stoessel	Juliana Gallipolitti	Isabel Aladro	Juan Pablo Nieves	Agustín Iturbide	Lucas Dominguez
Tini Stoessel	Manuela Bas	Sebastián Pérez	**Sofía Casadey**	~~Lucas Catsoulieris~~	Camila Molina
Tini Stoessel	Emmanuel Francia	Karen Paz	Sofía Agüero Petros	Bahía Larcamon	Felipe Andant
Tini Stoessel	Marcelo Ponce	Mathias Cuadro	Melisa Morales	Nahuel Bolotín	Natalia Belén
Tini Stoessel	Sol Giordano	Valentina Madanes			
Axel					
Axel	Amorina Alday	Federico Gómez	Pedro Culiandro	**Jorge Jofre**	Aymara Aybar
Axel	Eugenia Stuk	Jonatan Bisotto	Silvina Zanollo	~~Lucas Belbruno~~	~~Tomás Maldonado~~
Axel	Mariano Amante	Lucila Ruiu	Anastasia Amarante	Camila Canziani	Delfina Sanda
Axel	Juan Pedro Albanesi	Lúa Castro	Matias Flores	Pablo Díaz	Rodrigo Herrera
Axel	Magdalena Soria	Victoria López			
Note: Italicized names are stolen artists (names struck through within former teams). Bolded names are artists who received the Coach Comeback and advanced to the Playoffs.

== Blind auditions ==
Color key

✔	Coach hit his/her "I WANT YOU" button
	Artist defaulted to this coach's team
	Artist elected to join this coach's team
	Artist eliminated with no coach pressing his or her "I WANT YOU" button

Blind auditions results
Episode	Order	Artist	Age	Hometown	Song	Coach's and artist's choices			
Episode	Order	Artist	Age	Hometown	Song	Montaner	Soledad	Tini	Axel
Episode 1 (Monday, 1 October 2018)
Episode 1 (Monday, 1 October 2018)	1	Federico Gómez	23	Lomas de Zamora, Buenos Aires	"When I Was Your Man "	✔	✔	✔	✔
Episode 1 (Monday, 1 October 2018)	2	Mario Virulón	23	San Rafael, Mendoza	"Motivos"	✔	—	—	—
Episode 1 (Monday, 1 October 2018)	3	Natalia Lara	42	Tres Arroyos, Buenos Aires	"Melodía de arrabal"	✔	✔	✔	✔
Episode 1 (Monday, 1 October 2018)	4	Juan Teisaire	21	Pilar, Buenos Aires	"I Want to Break Free"	—	—	—	—
Episode 1 (Monday, 1 October 2018)	5	Pablo Carrasco	48	Pergamino, Buenos Aires	"Still Loving You"	✔	✔	✔	✔
Episode 1 (Monday, 1 October 2018)	6	María Eugenia Mambrin	22	Corrientes, Corrientes	"Tus ganas de querer"	—	—	—	—
Episode 1 (Monday, 1 October 2018)	7	Isabel Aladro	18	CABA, Buenos Aires	"I Want You Back"	—	✔	✔	—
Episode 2 (Tuesday, 2 October 2018)
Episode 2 (Tuesday, 2 October 2018)	1	Braulio Assanelli	22	Canelones, Uruguay	"Tanto"	✔	✔	✔	✔
Episode 2 (Tuesday, 2 October 2018)	2	Aymara Aybar	25	Cafayate, Salta	"Piel canela"	—	✔	✔	✔
Episode 2 (Tuesday, 2 October 2018)	3	Barbara Iribias	23	Resistencia, Chaco	"I'd Rather Go Blind"	—	—	—	—
Episode 2 (Tuesday, 2 October 2018)	4	Lucas Catsoulieris	27	Benavidez, Buenos Aires	"Just the Way You Are"	✔	—	✔	—
Episode 2 (Tuesday, 2 October 2018)	5	Daniel & Leonardo Vilchez	32	San Martín, Mendoza	"No saber de ti"	—	—	—	—
Episode 2 (Tuesday, 2 October 2018)	6	Valentina Madanes	18	CABA, Buenos Aires	"Love on the Brain"	—	—	✔	—
Episode 2 (Tuesday, 2 October 2018)	7	Pedro Culiandro	21	Corrientes, Corrientes	"Oración del remanso"	✔	✔	✔	✔
Episode 3 (Wednesday, 3 October 2018)
Episode 3 (Wednesday, 3 October 2018)	1	Hermanos Mamonde	21 & 27	Córdoba, Córdoba	"Camino y piedra"	—	✔	—	✔
Episode 3 (Wednesday, 3 October 2018)	2	Agustín Iturbide	19	Sierra de los Padres, Buenos Aires	"Perfect"	✔	✔	✔	✔
Episode 3 (Wednesday, 3 October 2018)	3	Mercedes Rumi	22	Carmen de Areco, Buenos Aires	"Je veux"	—	—	—	—
Episode 3 (Wednesday, 3 October 2018)	4	Agustín Vega	32	CABA, Buenos Aires	"You Make Me Feel So Young"	—	✔	—	—
Episode 3 (Wednesday, 3 October 2018)	5	David Pla	26	Salta, Salta	"El Rey"	—	—	—	—
Episode 3 (Wednesday, 3 October 2018)	6	Anastasia Amarante	22	Villa Allende, Córdoba	"Don't Speak"	✔	—	—	✔
Episode 3 (Wednesday, 3 October 2018)	7	Darío Lazarte	33	Villa María, Córdoba	"Mi historia entre tus dedos"	✔	✔	—	—
Episode 4 (Thursday, 4 October 2018)
Episode 4 (Thursday, 4 October 2018)	1	Tomás Maldonado	19	San Fernando, Buenos Aires	"Friends"	✔	✔	—	✔
Episode 4 (Thursday, 4 October 2018)	2	Bahía Larcamon	18	Bariloche, Río Negro	"Todo se transforma"	✔	✔	✔	✔
Episode 4 (Thursday, 4 October 2018)	3	Igor Sansovic	34	Split, Croacia	"Bailar pegados"	—	—	—	—
Episode 4 (Thursday, 4 October 2018)	4	Rodrigo Herrera	39	Las Heras, Mendoza	"Before You Accuse Me"	—	—	—	✔
Episode 4 (Thursday, 4 October 2018)	5	Andrea Deleón	30	Montevideo, Uruguay	"Oh! Darling"	—	—	—	—
Episode 4 (Thursday, 4 October 2018)	6	Abigail Acosta	22	Pérez Millán, Buenos Aires	"Oye"	✔	✔	—	—
Episode 4 (Thursday, 4 October 2018)	7	Jonathan Bisotto	N/A	Río Cuarto, Córdoba	"Luna cautiva"	—	✔	—	—
Episode 5 (Monday, 8 October 2018)
Episode 5 (Monday, 8 October 2018)	1	Diego Márquez	N/A	Venado Tuerto, Santa Fe	"O Tú o Ninguna "	✔	—	—	—
Episode 5 (Monday, 8 October 2018)	2	Luz Purita	20	Mataderos, Buenos Aires	"Run to You"	—	—	—	—
Episode 5 (Monday, 8 October 2018)	3	Sofía Morales	20	San Miguel, Corrientes	"Zamba del laurel"	✔	✔	—	—
Episode 5 (Monday, 8 October 2018)	4	Agustín Aballay	31	San Luis, San Luis	"Persiana americana"	—	—	—	—
Episode 5 (Monday, 8 October 2018)	5	Marcelo Ponce	34	Rosario, Santa Fe	"Solamente tú"	✔	—	✔	—
Episode 5 (Monday, 8 October 2018)	6	Julián Esión Kaplan	20	Versalles, Buenos Aires	"Thinking Out Loud"	—	—	—	—
Episode 5 (Monday, 8 October 2018)	7	Silvina Zanollo	29	Chivilcoy, Buenos Aires	"Welcome to the Jungle"	✔	✔	✔	✔
Episode 6 (Tuesday, 9 October 2018)
Episode 6 (Tuesday, 9 October 2018)	1	Esther Carpintero	N/A	Extremadura, Spain	"Ay, pena, penita, pena"	—	✔	—	✔
Episode 6 (Tuesday, 9 October 2018)	2	Alexis Tomé	N/A	Rosario, Santa Fe	"Rolling in the Deep"	—	—	—	—
Episode 6 (Tuesday, 9 October 2018)	3	Melisa Morales	N/A	Tres Arroyos, Buenos Aires	"Paisaje"	—	✔	✔	—
Episode 6 (Tuesday, 9 October 2018)	4	Julieta & Lara Gelmini	21	San Isidro, Buenos Aires	"Can't Buy Me Love"	—	—	—	—
Episode 6 (Tuesday, 9 October 2018)	5	Irvin Díaz Escobar	18	Caracas, Venezuela	"When I Was Your Man"	✔	✔	✔	✔
Episode 6 (Tuesday, 9 October 2018)	6	María Inés González	28	Versalles, Buenos Aires	"Sin miedo"	—	—	—	—
Episode 6 (Tuesday, 9 October 2018)	7	Diego Iturbide	40	Sierra de los Padres, Buenos Aires	"Easy"	—	✔	—	✔
Episode 7 (Wednesday, 10 October 2018)
Episode 7 (Wednesday, 10 October 2018)	1	Jimena Díaz	28	Ranchillos, Tucumán	"Así no te amará jamás"	—	✔	✔	✔
Episode 7 (Wednesday, 10 October 2018)	2	Cecilio Casis	34	Mar del Plata, Buenos Aires	"Crimen"	—	—	—	—
Episode 7 (Wednesday, 10 October 2018)	3	Julieta Chaves	19	Vicente López, Buenos Aires	"Valerie"	—	—	—	—
Episode 7 (Wednesday, 10 October 2018)	4	Alejo Dueñas	21	CABA, Buenos Aires	"Wake Me Up"	✔	—	—	—
Episode 7 (Wednesday, 10 October 2018)	5	Mercedes Giménez	N/A	Santa Fe, Santa Fe	"Como la cigarra"	—	—	—	—
Episode 7 (Wednesday, 10 October 2018)	6	Yanina Galeasi	29	Córdoba, Córdoba	"Sin ti"	✔	—	—	—
Episode 7 (Wednesday, 10 October 2018)	7	Mariano Amante	31	Villa del Parque, Buenos Aires	"They Don't Care About Us"	—	✔	—	✔
Episode 8 (Thursday, 11 October 2018)
Episode 8 (Thursday, 11 October 2018)	1	Isaias Dodds	30	Mar del Plata, Buenos Aires	"Ángel"	✔	—	—	—
Episode 8 (Thursday, 11 October 2018)	2	Armand Jr. Gallegos	26	Villa Carlos Paz, Córdoba	"Riptide"	—	—	—	—
Episode 8 (Thursday, 11 October 2018)	3	Dúo Salteño	24 & 26	Vicente López, Buenos Aires	"Libre y solterito"	✔	✔	—	✔
Episode 8 (Thursday, 11 October 2018)	4	Jennifer Suarez	N/A	Montevideo, Uruguay	"I Wanna Dance with Somebody"	—	—	—	—
Episode 8 (Thursday, 11 October 2018)	5	Sofía Casadey	18	Rosario, Santa Fe	"My Immortal"	—	—	✔	—
Episode 8 (Thursday, 11 October 2018)	6	Eugenio Imfeld	25	Sáenz Peña, Chaco	"No hay nadie más"	—	—	—	—
Episode 8 (Thursday, 11 October 2018)	7	Mathias Cuadro	24	Montevideo, Uruguay	"Kilómetros"	✔	✔	✔	—
Episode 9 (Monday, 15 October 2018)
Episode 9 (Monday, 15 October 2018)	1	Maximiliano Mercado	22	La Rioja, La Rioja	"Hoy Tengo Ganas de Ti"	—	—	—	—
Episode 9 (Monday, 15 October 2018)	2	Natalia Belén	23	Tigre, Buenos Aires	"Someone like You"	—	—	✔	—
Episode 9 (Monday, 15 October 2018)	3	Florencia Miranda	24	Del Viso, Buenos Aires	"En cambio no"	—	—	—	—
Episode 9 (Monday, 15 October 2018)	4	Paula Torres	N/A	Córdoba, Córdoba	"I Will Always Love You"	✔	✔	✔	✔
Episode 9 (Monday, 15 October 2018)	5	Luciano Sagua	35	San Juan, San Juan	"Penumbras"	—	—	—	—
Episode 9 (Monday, 15 October 2018)	6	Javier Lara	34	Ezeiza, Buenos Aires	"Unchained Melody"	—	✔	—	—
Episode 9 (Monday, 15 October 2018)	7	Jorge Jofre	50	San Rafael, Mendoza	"Spaghetti del rock"	—	—	—	✔
Episode 10 (Tuesday, 16 October 2018)
Episode 10 (Tuesday, 16 October 2018)	1	Felipe Andant	27	GBA, Buenos Aires	"Sé que ya no volverás"	—	—	✔	—
Episode 10 (Tuesday, 16 October 2018)	2	Luna Mendez	18	Castelar, Buenos Aires	"Eleanor Rigby"	—	—	—	—
Episode 10 (Tuesday, 16 October 2018)	3	Diego Aramburu	39	La Plata, Buenos Aires	"Todo mi amor"	—	✔	—	—
Episode 10 (Tuesday, 16 October 2018)	4	Isaac Colmenares	22	Caracas, Venezuela	"Can't Help Falling in Love"	—	—	—	—
Episode 10 (Tuesday, 16 October 2018)	5	Camila Canziani	20	Centenario, Neuquén	"Listen"	✔	✔	✔	✔
Episode 10 (Tuesday, 16 October 2018)	6	Santiago Klein	25	Frías, Santiago del Estero	"Seguir viviendo sin tu amor"	—	—	—	—
Episode 10 (Tuesday, 16 October 2018)	7	Adalí Montero	36	Lima, Perú	"Me va a extrañar"	✔	✔	—	✔
Episode 11 (Wednesday, 17 October 2018)
Episode 11 (Wednesday, 17 October 2018)	1	Pablo Díaz	25	Córdoba, Córdoba	"Nada Es Para Siempre"	—	—	—	✔
Episode 11 (Wednesday, 17 October 2018)	2	Sofía Arce	N/A	Mendoza, Mendoza	"Lovefool"	—	—	—	—
Episode 11 (Wednesday, 17 October 2018)	3	Eduardo Espinoza	39	La Plata, Buenos Aires	"El deseo de oír tu voz"	—	—	—	—
Episode 11 (Wednesday, 17 October 2018)	4	Victoria Goldaracena	24	Trelew, Chubut	"Call me"	—	✔	—	—
Episode 11 (Wednesday, 17 October 2018)	5	Iván Caporaletti	28	Venado Tuerto, Santa Fe	"Ojalá que no puedas"	—	—	—	—
Episode 11 (Wednesday, 17 October 2018)	6	Gianfranco Nanni	27	Santa Fe, Santa Fe	"Te vi venir"	✔	✔	—	✔
Episode 11 (Wednesday, 17 October 2018)	7	Juliana Gallipolitti	18	Corrientes, Corrientes	"If I Ain't Got You"	✔	—	✔	✔
Episode 12 (Thursday, 18 October 2018)
Episode 12 (Thursday, 18 October 2018)	1	Alejandro Martin	N/A	GBA, Buenos Aires	"Con los años"	—	—	—	—
Episode 12 (Thursday, 18 October 2018)	2	Lucía Capua	19	Pilar, Buenos Aires	"Algo contigo"	✔	—	—	—
Episode 12 (Thursday, 18 October 2018)	3	Serafín Jaima	18	San Genaro, Santa Fe	"Somebody to Love"	—	—	—	—
Episode 12 (Thursday, 18 October 2018)	4	Nahuel Bolotín	18	CABA, Buenos Aires	"One Night Only"	✔	✔	✔	—
Episode 12 (Thursday, 18 October 2018)	5	Camila Cabanelas	20	CABA, Buenos Aires	"Perdón, perdón"	—	—	—	—
Episode 12 (Thursday, 18 October 2018)	6	Amorina Alday	19	General Conesa, Buenos Aires	"Corazon mentiroso"	—	—	✔	✔
Episode 12 (Thursday, 18 October 2018)	7	Matias Flores	18	San Vicente, Buenos Aires	"If I Ain't Got You"	—	✔	✔	✔
Episode 13 (Monday, 22 October 2018)
Episode 13 (Monday, 22 October 2018)	1	Tamara Prieto	26	Mar del Plata, Buenos Aires	"Vivir así es morir de amor"	—	—	—	—
Episode 13 (Monday, 22 October 2018)	2	Alejandro Escobar	N/A	Muñiz, Buenos Aires	"Cielito Lindo"	—	✔	✔	✔
Episode 13 (Monday, 22 October 2018)	3	Daniel Muñoz	34	CABA, Buenos Aires	"Azul"	—	—	—	—
Episode 13 (Monday, 22 October 2018)	4	Lucas Domínguez	22	CABA, Buenos Aires	"The Way You Make Me Feel"	✔	✔	✔	—
Episode 13 (Monday, 22 October 2018)	5	Saiana de la Cruz	27	Montevideo, Uruguay	"Ayer"	—	—	—	—
Episode 13 (Monday, 22 October 2018)	6	Juan Pedro Albanesi	24	La Plata, Buenos Aires	"Enter Sandman"	—	✔	—	✔
Episode 14 (Tuesday, 23 October 2018)
Episode 14 (Tuesday, 23 October 2018)	1	Victoria López	23	CABA, Buenos Aires	"Como dos extraños"	—	—	—	✔
Episode 14 (Tuesday, 23 October 2018)	2	Cinthia Aristegui	N/A	Miramar, Buenos Aires	"La extraña dama"	—	—	—	—
Episode 14 (Tuesday, 23 October 2018)	3	Luziano Acosta	30	San Miguel de Tucumán, Tucumán	"Culpable o no"	—	—	—	—
Episode 14 (Tuesday, 23 October 2018)	4	Manuela Bas	22	CABA, Buenos Aires	"A Natural Woman"	✔	—	—	—
Episode 14 (Tuesday, 23 October 2018)	5	Roberto Araya	53	Formosa, Formosa	"Dulce Daniela"	—	—	—	—
Episode 14 (Tuesday, 23 October 2018)	6	Jacinta Travaglini	25	San Isidro, Buenos Aires	"Beautiful"	✔	—	—	—
Episode 14 (Tuesday, 23 October 2018)	7	Emmanuel Francia	25	Rosario, Santa Fe	"Me niego a perderte"	✔	—	✔	—
Episode 15 (Wednesday, 24 October 2018)
Episode 15 (Wednesday, 24 October 2018)	1	Agustín Juárez	18	San Miguel, Buenos Aires	"Con vos en el recuerdo"	—	✔	—	—
Episode 15 (Wednesday, 24 October 2018)	2	Nicolás Delgado	N/A	Zárate, Buenos Aires	"Mía"	—	—	—	—
Episode 15 (Wednesday, 24 October 2018)	3	Lucia Spaccasassi	30	Bahía Blanca, Buenos Aires	"The Way You Look Tonight"	✔	—	—	—
Episode 15 (Wednesday, 24 October 2018)	4	Patricio De Luca	34	Flores, Buenos Aires	"Amor con hielo"	—	—	—	—
Episode 15 (Wednesday, 24 October 2018)	5	Camila Molina	19	Chamical, La Rioja	"Once mil"	—	—	✔	—
Episode 15 (Wednesday, 24 October 2018)	6	Pablo Fava	25	GBA, Buenos Aires	"Hasta el final"	—	—	—	—
Episode 15 (Wednesday, 24 October 2018)	7	Celeste Dondero	23	San Martín, Buenos Aires	"Bad Romance"	—	✔	✔	✔
Episode 16 (Thursday, 25 October 2018)
Episode 16 (Thursday, 25 October 2018)	1	Fabrizio Panetta	23	Rosario, Santa Fe	"Me dediqué a perderte"	—	—	—	—
Episode 16 (Thursday, 25 October 2018)	2	Magdalena Soria	N/A	Metán, Salta	"Equivocada"	—	—	✔	✔
Episode 16 (Thursday, 25 October 2018)	3	Damián Cabrera	27	Campana, Buenos Aires	"El pastor"	—	—	—	—
Episode 16 (Thursday, 25 October 2018)	4	Lucas Belbruno	29	Monte Cristo, Córdoba	"Zamba para olvidar"	—	—	—	✔
Episode 16 (Thursday, 25 October 2018)	5	Johan Ruiz	25	La Plata, Buenos Aires	"Tú sin mí"	—	—	—	—
Episode 16 (Thursday, 25 October 2018)	6	Agostina Rosales	25	Santa Ana, Córdoba	"I Put a Spell on You"	✔	✔	✔	✔
Episode 17 (Monday, 29 October 2018)
Episode 17 (Monday, 29 October 2018)	1	Karen Paz	23	Villa Martelli, Buenos Aires	"Feeling Good"	—	✔	✔	—
Episode 17 (Monday, 29 October 2018)	2	Mario & Sebastián Duarte	N/A	Chajarí, Entre Ríos	"Déjame que me vaya"	—	—	—	—
Episode 17 (Monday, 29 October 2018)	3	Sebastián Pérez	30	Salta, Salta	"Cryin'"	—	—	✔	—
Episode 17 (Monday, 29 October 2018)	4	Dede Frantzita	N/A	Los Cayos, Haiti	"Yo quiero"	—	—	—	—
Episode 17 (Monday, 29 October 2018)	5	Delfina Sanda	19	CABA, Buenos Aires	"Aire"	✔	—	✔	✔
Episode 17 (Monday, 29 October 2018)	6	Franco Boffa	26	Rufino, Santa Fe	"Thinking Out Loud"	—	—	—	—
Episode 17 (Monday, 29 October 2018)	7	María Victoria Silva	24	Maracaibo, Venezuela	"Perdón, perdón"	✔	—	—	✔
Episode 18 (Tuesday, 30 October 2018)
Episode 18 (Tuesday, 30 October 2018)	1	Matías Álvarez	26	Mar del Plata, Buenos Aires	"Dígale"	—	—	—	—
Episode 18 (Tuesday, 30 October 2018)	2	Giovanna Nicola	18	Rosario, Santa Fe	"Think of Me"	—	✔	—	—
Episode 18 (Tuesday, 30 October 2018)	3	Gonzalo Gagliesi	22	Rosario, Santa Fe	"Me enamoré de ti"	—	—	—	—
Episode 18 (Tuesday, 30 October 2018)	4	Guadalupe Espeja	26	Belén de Escobar, Buenos Aires	"Yo quiero"	✔	—	—	—
Episode 18 (Tuesday, 30 October 2018)	5	Germán Contreras	21	Mendoza, Mendoza	"Solamente tú"	—	—	—	—
Episode 18 (Tuesday, 30 October 2018)	6	Inés Cricco Varela	19	San Isidro, Buenos Aires	"Rehab"	—	—	—	—
Episode 18 (Tuesday, 30 October 2018)	7	Lúa Castro	29	Rivadavia, Mendoza	"Fuego y pasión"	✔	✔	✔	✔
Episode 19 (Wednesday, 31 October 2018)
Episode 19 (Wednesday, 31 October 2018)	1	María Florencia Bario	24	Córdoba, Córdoba	"Come Together"	—	—	—	—
Episode 19 (Wednesday, 31 October 2018)	2	Victoria Arcay	18	Ituzaingó, Buenos Aires	"Te dejo en libertad"	—	✔	—	—
Episode 19 (Wednesday, 31 October 2018)	3	Martín Redondo	27	La Plata, Buenos Aires	"Me haces bien"	—	—	—	—
Episode 19 (Wednesday, 31 October 2018)	4	Sol Giordano	19	Villa María, Córdoba	"Billie Jean"	—	—	✔	—
Episode 19 (Wednesday, 31 October 2018)	5	Ezequiel Videla	37	Mar del Plata, Buenos Aires	"Bicho de ciudad"	—	—	—	—
Episode 19 (Wednesday, 31 October 2018)	6	Lara Eugenio	19	Lomas de Zamora, Buenos Aires	"Stone Cold"	—	—	—	—
Episode 19 (Wednesday, 31 October 2018)	7	Eugenia Stuk	21	Córdoba, Córdoba	"Historia de un Amor"	—	✔	—	✔
Episode 20 (Thursday, 1 November 2018)
Episode 20 (Thursday, 1 November 2018)	1	María Agostina Arnold	25	Santo Tomé, Santa Fe	"Fallin'"	—	—	—	—
Episode 20 (Thursday, 1 November 2018)	2	Lucila Ruiu	18	Victoria, Buenos Aires	"Lost Stars"	—	✔	—	✔
Episode 20 (Thursday, 1 November 2018)	3	Celeste Barreiro	N/A	Marcos Paz, Buenos Aires	"Con la misma moneda"	—	—	—	Team full
Episode 20 (Thursday, 1 November 2018)	4	Juan Martín Pott	19	Montevideo, Uruguay	"She Will Be Loved"	—	✔	—	Team full
Episode 20 (Thursday, 1 November 2018)	5	Sofía Agüero Petros	29	CABA, Buenos Aires	"Libre soy"	—	Team full	✔	Team full
Episode 20 (Thursday, 1 November 2018)	6	Juan Pablo Nieves	20	San Juan del Cesar, Colombia	"I Got You (I Feel Good)"	✔	Team full	Team full	Team full

== The Battles ==
The Battle Rounds started on 2 November. Season two's advisors include: Mau y Ricky for Team Montaner, Kany García for Team Sole, Cali y El Dandee for Team Tini, and Becky G for Team Axel. Contestants who win their battle or are stolen by another coach will advance to the Knockout rounds.

Color key:

Artist won the Battle and advanced to the Knockouts
Artist lost the Battle and was originally eliminated but received the Coach Comeback and advanced to the Playoffs
Artist lost the Battle and was eliminated

Episode & Date	Coach	Order	Winner	Song	Loser
Episode 22 (Monday, 5 November 2018)	Axel	1	Silvina Zanollo	"You Give Love a Bad Name"	Juan Pedro Albanesi
Episode 22 (Monday, 5 November 2018)	Tini Stoessel	2	Lucas Catsoulieris	"Lloran Las Rosas"	Mathías Cuadro
Episode 22 (Monday, 5 November 2018)	Soledad	3	Sofía Morales	"Perfume de carnaval"	Agustín Juárez
Episode 22 (Monday, 5 November 2018)	Tini Stoessel	4	Juliana Gallipolitti	"Ahora te puedes marchar"	Valentina Madanes
Episode 22 (Monday, 5 November 2018)	Ricardo Montaner	5	Paula Torres	"Alone"	Pablo Carrasco
Episode 23 (Tuesday, 6 November 2018)	Soledad	1	Esther Carpintero	"Como Tu Mujer"	Jimena Díaz
Episode 23 (Tuesday, 6 November 2018)	Axel	2	Mariano Amante	"Estaca zero"	Lúa Castro
Episode 23 (Tuesday, 6 November 2018)	Soledad	3	Jonatan Bisotto	"La noche sin ti"	Dúo Mamonde
Episode 23 (Tuesday, 6 November 2018)	Ricardo Montaner	4	Braulio Assanelli	"Y si fuera ella"	Diego Márquez
Episode 23 (Tuesday, 6 November 2018)	Tini	5	Karen Paz	"Take Me to Church"	Sofía Casadey
Episode 24 (Wednesday, 7 November 2018)	Soledad	1	Aymara Aybar	"Corazón contento"	Dúo Salteño
Episode 24 (Wednesday, 7 November 2018)	Axel	2	Lucila Ruiu	"Limón y sal"	Delfina Sanda
Episode 24 (Wednesday, 7 November 2018)	Tini Stoessel	3	Isabel Aladro	"Hello"	Natalia Belén
Episode 24 (Wednesday, 7 November 2018)	Ricardo Montaner	4	Irvin Díaz Escobar	"Vente Pa' Ca"	Alejo Dueñas
Episode 24 (Wednesday, 7 November 2018)	Axel	5	Pedro Culiandro	"La arenosa"	Pablo Díaz
Episode 25 (Thursday, 8 November 2018)	Ricardo Montaner	1	Darío Lazarte	"Cuando nadie me ve"	Abigail Acosta
Episode 25 (Thursday, 8 November 2018)	Soledad	2	Alejandro Escobar	"Cuando acaba el placer"	Victoria Arcay
Episode 25 (Thursday, 8 November 2018)	Ricardo Montaner	3	Mario Virulón	"Corazón hambriento"	Lucía Capua
Episode 25 (Thursday, 8 November 2018)	Tini Stoessel	4	Agustín Iturbide	"Sunday Morning"	Felipe Andant
Episode 25 (Thursday, 8 November 2018)	Axel	5	Lucas Belbruno	"Que nadie sepa mi sufrir"	Victoria Acosta
Episode 26 (Friday, 9 November 2018)	Soledad	1	Diego Iturbide	"I Was Made for Lovin' You"	Victoria Goldaracena
Episode 26 (Friday, 9 November 2018)	Axel	2	Eugenia Stuk	"No te quiero nada"	Matías Flores
Episode 26 (Friday, 9 November 2018)	Soledad	3	Agustina Rosales	"Ya no hay forma de pedir perdón"	Diego Aramburu
Episode 26 (Friday, 9 November 2018)	Ricardo Montaner	4	Yanina Galeasi	"La Gloria de Dios"	Isaias Dodds
Episode 26 (Friday, 9 November 2018)	Tini Stoessel	5	Sofía Agüero Petros	"Bang Bang"	Nahuel Bolotín
Episode 27 (Monday, 12 November 2018)	Soledad	1	Agustín Vega	"Fly Me to the Moon"	Celeste Dondero
Episode 27 (Monday, 12 November 2018)	Ricardo Montaner	2	Adalí Montero	"Sola otra vez"	Gianfranco Nanni
Episode 27 (Monday, 12 November 2018)	Tini Stoessel	3	Camila Molina	"Tanto amor"	Bahía Larcamón
Episode 27 (Monday, 12 November 2018)	Ricardo Montaner	4	Juan Pablo Nieves	"All That Jazz"	Lucía Spaccasassi
Episode 27 (Monday, 12 November 2018)	Axel	5	Federico Gómez	"Just Give Me a Reason"	Anastasia Amarante
Episode 28 (Tuesday, 13 November 2018)	Axel	1	Tomás Maldonado	"We Don't Talk Anymore"	Magdalena Soria
Episode 28 (Tuesday, 13 November 2018)	Tini Stoessel	2	Sebastián Pérez	"Asignatura Pendiente"	Marcelo Ponce
Episode 28 (Tuesday, 13 November 2018)	Ricardo Montaner	3	Guadalupe Espeja	"Por Amarte Así"	María Victoria Silva
Episode 28 (Tuesday, 13 November 2018)	Soledad	4	Natalia Lara	"El día que me quieras"	Javier Lara
Episode 28 (Tuesday, 13 November 2018)	Axel	5	Amorina Alday	"Princesa"	Camila Canziani
Episode 29 (Wednesday, 14 November 2018)	Ricardo Montaner	1	Manuela Bas	"I Gotta Feeling"	Jacinta Travaglini
Episode 29 (Wednesday, 14 November 2018)	Tini	2	Emmanuel Francia	"Consejo de amor"	Melisa Morales
Episode 29 (Wednesday, 14 November 2018)	Soledad	3	Juan Martínez Pott	"You Must Love Me"	Giovanna Nicola
Episode 29 (Wednesday, 14 November 2018)	Axel	4	Jorge Jofre	"Yo vengo a ofrecer mi corazón"	Rodrigo Herrera
Episode 29 (Wednesday, 14 November 2018)	Tini Stoessel	5	Lucas Domínguez	"Treasure"	Sol Giordano

== The Knockouts ==
The Knockouts round started on 15 November. The coaches can each steal two losing artist from another team. Carlos Vives is the advisor to contestants from all teams in this round. After this round, each coach got the chance to bring an eliminated contestant back into the competition. The top 32 contestants then moved on to the Playoffs.

Color key:

Artist won the Knockout and advanced to the Live Playoffs
Artist lost the Knockout but was stolen by another coach and advanced to the Playoffs
Artist lost the Battle and was originally eliminated but received the Coach Comeback and advanced to the Playoffs
Artist lost the Knockout and was eliminated

Episodes	Coach	Order	Song	Artists		Song	'Steal' result			
Episodes	Coach	Order	Song	Winner(s)	Loser	Song	Ricardo	Soledad	Tini	Axel
Episode 30 (Thursday, 15 November 2018)	Tini Stoessel	1	"The Show Must Go On"	Sebastián Perez	Karen Paz	"No One"	—	—	—N/a	—
Episode 30 (Thursday, 15 November 2018)	Axel	2	"Zamba de amor en vuelo"	Amorina Alday	Lucila Ruiu	"Tu nombre"	—	—	—	—N/a
Episode 30 (Thursday, 15 November 2018)	Ricardo Montaner	3	"Dígale"	Mario Virulón	Darío Lazarte	"Uno por uno"	—N/a	✔	✔	—
Episode 31 (Friday, 16 November 2018)	Tini Stoessel	1	"No Me Doy por Vencido"	Juliana Gallipoliti	Camila Molina	"Tú"	—	—	—N/a	—
Episode 31 (Friday, 16 November 2018)	Soledad	2	"Yo soy tu amigo fiel"	Agustín Vega	Juan Martinez Pott	"Recuérdame"	—	—N/a	—	—
Episode 31 (Friday, 16 November 2018)	Axel	3	"Inevitable"	Silvina Zanollo	Jorge Jofre	"Campanas en la noche"	—	—	—	—N/a
Episode 32 (Monday, 19 November 2018)	Axel	1	"Creo en ti"	Federico Gómez	Mariano Amante	"Sin cadenas"	—	—	—	—N/a
Episode 32 (Monday, 19 November 2018)	Soledad	2	"Quién Como Tú"	Sofía Morales	Jonatan Bisotto	"Si No Te Hubieras Ido"	—	—N/a	—	✔
Episode 32 (Monday, 19 November 2018)	Ricardo Montaner	3	"Pero Me Acuerdo de Ti"	Yanina Galeassi	Guadalupe Espeja	"Una canción diferente"	—N/a	—	—	—
Episode 33 (Tuesday, 20 November 2018)	Tini Stoessel	1	"Ya me enteré"	Agustín Iturbide	Emmanuel Francia	"Aléjate de mí"	—	—	—N/a	—
Episode 33 (Tuesday, 20 November 2018)	Ricardo Montaner	2	"Será"	Braulio Assanelli	Adalí Montero	"Gata bajo la lluvia"	—N/a	—	—	—
Episode 33 (Tuesday, 20 November 2018)	Soledad	3	"O capito que ti amo"	Agostina Rosales	Aymara Aybar	"La Vie en rose"	—	—N/a	✔	✔
Episode 34 (Wednesday, 21 November 2018)	Tini Stoessel	1	"Halo"	Isabel Aladro	Lucas Catsoulieris	"I'm Not the Only One"	✔	—	—N/a	Team full
Episode 34 (Wednesday, 21 November 2018)	Axel	2	"Y Hubo Alguien"	Pedro Ríos	Lucas Belbruno	"Bésame"	—	✔	—	Team full
Episode 35 (Thursday, 22 November 2018)	Axel	1	"Almost Is Never Enough"	Eugenia Stuk	Tomás Maldonado	"Sign of the Times"	✔	Team full	—	Team full
Episode 35 (Thursday, 22 November 2018)	Soledad	2	"Rata de dos patas"	Natalia Lara	Esther Carpintero	"Puro teatro"	Team full	Team full	—	Team full
Episode 35 (Thursday, 22 November 2018)	Ricardo Montaner	3	"Fruta Fresca"	Irvin Díaz Escobar	Juan Pablo Nieves	"La Gota Fría"	Team full	Team full	✔	Team full
Episode 36 (Friday, 23 November 2018)	Tini Stoessel	1	"Versace on the Floor"	Lucas Domínguez	Sofía Agüero Petros	"Diamonds"	Team full	Team full	—N/a	Team full
Episode 36 (Friday, 23 November 2018)	Soledad	2	"Vencedores vencidos"	Alejandro Escobar	Diego Iturbide	"El revelde"	Team full	Team full	—	Team full
Episode 36 (Friday, 23 November 2018)	Ricardo Montaner	3	"The Greatest Love of All"	Paula Torres	Manuela Bas	"Can't Take My Eyes Off You"	Team full	Team full	✔	Team full

== The Playoffs ==
The Playoffs comprised episodes 37 to 40. The top thirty-two artists perform, with two artists from each team advancing based on their coach's own decision. The remaining contestants face the public vote and two other advance.

Color key:

Artist was selected by their coach to advance to the Top 16
Artist received the Public's vote and advanced to the Top 16
Artist was eliminated

Episode	Coach	Order	Artist	Song	Result
Episode 37 (Monday, 26 November 2018)	Ricardo Montaner	1	Tomás Maldonado	"Darte un Beso"	Eliminated
Episode 37 (Monday, 26 November 2018)	Ricardo Montaner	2	Yanina Galeasi	"Imaginame Sin Ti"	Eliminated
Episode 37 (Monday, 26 November 2018)	Ricardo Montaner	3	Mario Virulón	"Volver"	Public's vote (31.674%)
Episode 37 (Monday, 26 November 2018)	Ricardo Montaner	4	Lucas Catsoulieris	"A Puro Dolor"	Eliminated
Episode 37 (Monday, 26 November 2018)	Ricardo Montaner	5	Braulio Assanelli	"La quiero a morir"	Ricardo's choice
Episode 37 (Monday, 26 November 2018)	Ricardo Montaner	6	Paula Torres	"The Power of Love"	Eliminated
Episode 37 (Monday, 26 November 2018)	Ricardo Montaner	7	Irvin Díaz Escobar	"Mientes"	Ricardo's choice
Episode 37 (Monday, 26 November 2018)	Ricardo Montaner	8	Pablo Carrasco	"Carrie"	Public's vote (32.02%)
Episode 38 (Tue, 27 November 2018)	Soledad	1	Agustín Vega	"Haven't Met You Yet"	Eliminated
Episode 38 (Tue, 27 November 2018)	Soledad	2	Natalia Lara	"Afiches"	Eliminated
Episode 38 (Tue, 27 November 2018)	Soledad	3	Alejandro Escobar	"Tengo Todo Excepto a Ti"	Eliminated
Episode 38 (Tue, 27 November 2018)	Soledad	4	Sofía Morales	"A la abuela Emilia"	Soledad's choice
Episode 38 (Tue, 27 November 2018)	Soledad	5	Juan Pablo & Mauro	"Mi vida ven a bailar"	Public's vote (13.976%)
Episode 38 (Tue, 27 November 2018)	Soledad	6	Darío Lazarte	"¿Y cómo es él?"	Soledad's choice
Episode 38 (Tue, 27 November 2018)	Soledad	7	Agostina Rosales	"Man! I Feel Like a Woman!"	Eliminated
Episode 38 (Tue, 27 November 2018)	Soledad	8	Lucas Belbruno	"Aleluya"	Public's vote (46.489%)
Episode 39 (Wed, 28 November 2018)	Axel	1	Eugenia Stuk	"¡Corre!"	Eliminated
Episode 39 (Wed, 28 November 2018)	Axel	2	Jonatan Bisotto	"Chacarera de las piedras"	Eliminated
Episode 39 (Wed, 28 November 2018)	Axel	3	Amorina Alday	"Por lo que yo te quiero"	Axel's choice
Episode 39 (Wed, 28 November 2018)	Axel	4	Federico Gómez	"No Podrás"	Axel's choice
Episode 39 (Wed, 28 November 2018)	Axel	5	Aymara Aybar	"Hasta la Raíz"	Eliminated
Episode 39 (Wed, 28 November 2018)	Axel	6	Pedro Culiandro	"Que ganas de no verte nunca más"	Public's vote (42.828%)
Episode 39 (Wed, 28 November 2018)	Axel	7	Silvina Zanollo	"Tengo"	Eliminated
Episode 39 (Wed, 28 November 2018)	Axel	8	Jorge Jofre	"Tumbas de gloria"	Public's vote (21.439%)
Episode 40 (Thurs, 29 November 2018)	Tini Stoessel	1	Lucas Domínguez	"A partir de hoy"	Eliminated
Episode 40 (Thurs, 29 November 2018)	Tini Stoessel	2	Manuela Bas	"You Know I'm No Good"	Eliminated
Episode 40 (Thurs, 29 November 2018)	Tini Stoessel	3	Sebastián Pérez	"Entrégate"	Eliminated
Episode 40 (Thurs, 29 November 2018)	Tini Stoessel	4	Sofía Casadey	"Chandelier"	Eliminated
Episode 40 (Thurs, 29 November 2018)	Tini Stoessel	5	Juan Pablo Nieves	"Vivir mi vida"	Public's vote (36.40%)
Episode 40 (Thurs, 29 November 2018)	Tini Stoessel	6	Juliana Gallipolitti	"Falsas Esperanzas"	Tini's choice
Episode 40 (Thurs, 29 November 2018)	Tini Stoessel	7	Agustín Iturbide	"Sorry"	Public's vote (19.63%)
Episode 40 (Thurs, 29 November 2018)	Tini Stoessel	8	Isabel Aladro	"Nos veremos otra vez"	Tini's choice

== Live shows ==
Color key:

Artist was saved by the Public's votes
Artist was eliminated

=== Round 1: Top 16 (3–7 December) ===
This season, the live show voting mechanism has changed. Every night, a different team performs. At the end of each live show, voting lines get opened for 24 hours. At the beginning of the following night's live show, the results are announced and one artist is eliminated. At the end of every round, each coach will have one less artist in his/her team which means that every team will be represented by one artist in the final.

Episode	Coach	Order	Artist	Song	Result
Episode 42 (Monday, 3 December 2018)	Axel	1	Federico Gómez	"Si tú no estás aqui"	Public's vote (22.530%)
Episode 42 (Monday, 3 December 2018)	Axel	2	Jorge Jofre	"Un pacto"	Eliminated (21.445%)
Episode 42 (Monday, 3 December 2018)	Axel	3	Pedro Ríos	"Enero"	Public's vote (26.611%)
Episode 42 (Monday, 3 December 2018)	Axel	4	Amorina Alday	"No te creas tan importante"	Public's vote (29.414%)
Episode 43 (Tuesday, 4 December 2018)	Soledad	1	Dúo Salteño	"Entra en mi vida"	Public's vote (13.757%)
Episode 43 (Tuesday, 4 December 2018)	Soledad	2	Sofía Morales	"La Bikina"	Eliminated (13.325%)
Episode 43 (Tuesday, 4 December 2018)	Soledad	3	Darío Lazarte	"Realmente no estoy tan solo"	Public's vote (35.259%)
Episode 43 (Tuesday, 4 December 2018)	Soledad	4	Lucas Belbruno	"Pasional"	Public's vote (37.659%)
Episode 44 (Wednesday, 5 December 2018)	Tini Stoessel	1	Juan Pablo Nieves	"Happy"	Public's vote (20.501%)
Episode 44 (Wednesday, 5 December 2018)	Tini Stoessel	2	Agustín Iturbide	"Disparo al Corazón"	Eliminated (12.075%)
Episode 44 (Wednesday, 5 December 2018)	Tini Stoessel	3	Isabel Aladro	"The Climb"	Public's vote (34.292%)
Episode 44 (Wednesday, 5 December 2018)	Tini Stoessel	4	Juliana Gallipolitti	"Fighter"	Public's vote (33.132%)
Episode 45 (Thursday, 6 December 2018)	Ricardo Montaner	1	Irvin Díaz Escobar	"No importa la distancia"	Eliminated (3.292%)
Episode 45 (Thursday, 6 December 2018)	Ricardo Montaner	2	Braulio Assanelli	"Vivo por ella"	Public's vote (69.363%)
Episode 45 (Thursday, 6 December 2018)	Ricardo Montaner	3	Pablo Carrasco	"The Final Countdown"	Public's vote (9.195%)
Episode 45 (Thursday, 6 December 2018)	Ricardo Montaner	4	Mario Virulón	"Vuélveme a Querer"	Public's vote (18.150%)

Non-competition performances
Order	Performer	Song
42.1	The four coaches: Ricardo Montaner, Soledad, Tini Stoessel & Axel	"De Música Ligera"

=== Quarterfinals: Top 12 (7, 10, 11 & 12December ) ===
The 8 artists who survive this week will participate in a live concert that will take place in Teatro Gran Rex, on 19 December.

In episode 46, Soledad could not attend the show. She was replaced by actress and singer Natalia Oreiro.

Episode	Coach	Order	Artist	Song	Result
Episode 46 (Friday, 7 December 2018)	Axel	1	Pedro Ríos	"Yo soy aquél"	Eliminated (29.98%)
Episode 46 (Friday, 7 December 2018)	Axel	2	Federico Gómez	"Quédate"	Public's vote (38.05%)
Episode 46 (Friday, 7 December 2018)	Axel	3	Amorina Alday	"Por Debajo de la Mesa"	Public's vote (31.96%)
Episode 47 (Monday, 10 December 2018)	Soledad	1	Dúo Salteño	"Hoy"	Eliminated (16.37%)
Episode 47 (Monday, 10 December 2018)	Soledad	2	Darío Lazarte	"Corazón Partío"	Public's vote (34.89%)
Episode 47 (Monday, 10 December 2018)	Soledad	3	Lucas Belbruno	"América"	Public's vote (48.74%)
Episode 48 (Tuesday, 11 December 2018)	Tini Stoessel	1	Juan Pablo Nieves	"El cantante"	Eliminated (30.204%)
Episode 48 (Tuesday, 11 December 2018)	Tini Stoessel	2	Isabel Aladro	"El tiempo es veloz"	Public's vote (33.714%)
Episode 48 (Tuesday, 11 December 2018)	Tini Stoessel	3	Juliana Gallipolitti	"Amor prohibido"	Public's vote (36.082%)
Episode 49 (Wednesday, 12 December 2018)	Ricardo Montaner	1	Pablo Carrasco	"Déjame llorar"	Eliminated (14.457%)
Episode 49 (Wednesday, 12 December 2018)	Ricardo Montaner	2	Braulio Assanelli	"No Vaya a Ser"	Public's vote (62.623%)
Episode 49 (Wednesday, 12 December 2018)	Ricardo Montaner	3	Mario Virulón	"Volverás"	Public's vote (22.920%)

Non-competition performances
Order	Performer	Song
46.1	Axel & his team (Amorina Alday, Federico Gómez & Pedro Ríos)	"Balderrama"
47.1	Ricardo Montaner & Evaluna Montaner	"Me va a extrañar"
47.2	Soledad & her team (Darío Lazarte, Dúo Salteño & Lucas Belbruno)	"3 AM"
48.1	Axel & Soledad	"No es no"
48.2	Tini & her team (Isabel Aladro, Juan Pablo Nieves & Juliana Gallipolitti)	"Me siento mucho mejor"
49.1	Tini & Cali y El Dandee	"Por que te vas"
49.2	Ricardo & his team (Braulio Assanelli, Mario Virulón & Pablo Carrasco)	"Nostalgias"

=== Semifinals: Top 8 (13 & 14 December) ===
In episode 50 Tini Stoessel could not attend the show. She was replaced by Spanish singer Pablo Alborán. Also In episode 51, Axel could not attend the show. He was replaced by singer Geronimo Rauch.

Episode	Coach	Order	Artist	Song	Result
Episode 50 (Thursday, 13 December 2018)	Axel	1	Federico Gómez	"Mientes tan bien"	Eliminated (49.446%)
Episode 50 (Thursday, 13 December 2018)	Axel	2	Amorina Alday	"Me vas a extrañar"	Public's vote (50.554%)
Episode 50 (Thursday, 13 December 2018)	Soledad	3	Lucas Belbruno	"La llave"	Public's vote (64.416%)
Episode 50 (Thursday, 13 December 2018)	Soledad	4	Darío Lazarte	"El mundo"	Eliminated (35.584%)
Episode 51 (Friday, 14 December 2018)	Tini Stoessel	1	Juliana Gallipolitti	"Million Reasons"	Public's vote (55.342%)
Episode 51 (Friday, 14 December 2018)	Tini Stoessel	2	Isabel Aladro	"Celebration"	Eliminated (44.658%)
Episode 51 (Friday, 14 December 2018)	Ricardo Montaner	3	Mario Virulón	"El aprendiz"	Eliminated (43.737%)
Episode 51 (Friday, 14 December 2018)	Ricardo Montaner	4	Braulio Assanelli	"Amiga Mía"	Public's vote (56.263%)

Non-competition performances
Order	Performer	Song
50.1	Pablo Alborán	"Prometo"
50.2	Team Axel (Amorina Alday & Federico Gómez)	"Échame la Culpa"
50.3	Team Soledad (Darío Lazarte & Lucas Belbruno)	"Historia de taxi"
51.1	Team Tini (Isabel Aladro & Juliana Gallipolitti)	"Wrecking Ball"
51.2	Team Ricardo (Braulio Assanelli & Mario Virulón)	"Tú decidiste dejarme"

=== Finale: Top 4 (16 December) ===
Coach	Artist	Order	Solo Song	Order	Duet Song (with Coach)	Result
Soledad	Lucas Belbruno	1	"Seré"	9	"Vivir es hoy"	Runner-up
Axel	Amorina Alday	6	"Como la Flor"	2	"Te voy a amar"	Third Place
Tini Stoessel	Juliana Gallipolitti	7	"I Say a Little Prayer"	3	"Quiero volver"	Fourth Place
Ricardo Montaner	Braulio Assanelli	4	"Hoy Tengo Ganas de Ti"	8	"Tan Enamorados"	Winner

Non-competition performances
Order	Performer	Song
52.1	The Final 4 (Amorina Alday, Braulio Assanelli, Juliana Gallipolitti & Lucas Belbruno)	"Un poco loco"

== Elimination chart ==
=== Overall ===
Color key
Artist's info

- Team Ricardo
- Team Soledad
- Team Tini
- Team Axel

Result details

- Winner
- Runner-up
- Third place
- Fourth place
- Eliminated

Live Show Results per week
Artists	Round 1	Quarterfinals	Semifinals	Finale
Braulio Assanelli	Safe	Safe	Safe	Winner
Lucas Belbruno	Safe	Safe	Safe	Runner-up
Amorina Alday	Safe	Safe	Safe	3rd place
Juliana Gallipolitti	Safe	Safe	Safe	4th place
Darío Lazarte	Safe	Safe	Eliminated	Eliminated (Semifinals)
Isabel Aladro	Safe	Safe	Eliminated	Eliminated (Semifinals)
Federico Gómez	Safe	Safe	Eliminated	Eliminated (Semifinals)
Mario Virulón	Safe	Safe	Eliminated	Eliminated (Semifinals)
Dúo Salteño	Safe	Eliminated	Eliminated (Quarterfinals)	
Juan Pablo Nieves	Safe	Eliminated	Eliminated (Quarterfinals)	
Pablo Carrasco	Safe	Eliminated	Eliminated (Quarterfinals)	
Pedro Ríos	Safe	Eliminated	Eliminated (Quarterfinals)	
Agustín Iturbide	Eliminated	Eliminated (Round 1)		
Irvin Díaz Escobar	Eliminated	Eliminated (Round 1)		
Jorge Jofre	Eliminated	Eliminated (Round 1)		
Sofía Morales	Eliminated	Eliminated (Round 1)		

=== Teams ===
Color key
Artist's info

- Team Ricardo
- Team Soledad
- Team Tini
- Team Axel

Results details

- Winner
- Runner-up
- Third place
- Fourth place
- Eliminated

Artist	Round 1	Quarterfinals	Semifinals	Finale
Braulio Assanelli	Advanced	Advanced	Advanced	Winner
Mario Virulón	Advanced	Advanced	Eliminated	
Pablo Carrasco	Advanced	Eliminated		
Irvin Díaz Escobar	Eliminated			
Lucas Belbruno	Advanced	Advanced	Advanced	Runner-up
Darío Lazarte	Advanced	Advanced	Eliminated	
Dúo Salteño	Advanced	Eliminated		
Sofía Morales	Eliminated			
Juliana Gallipolitti	Advanced	Advanced	Advanced	Fourth Place
Isabel Aladro	Advanced	Advanced	Eliminated	
Juan Pablo Nieves	Advanced	Eliminated		
Agustín Iturbide	Eliminated			
Amorina Alday	Advanced	Advanced	Advanced	Third Place
Federico Gómez	Advanced	Advanced	Eliminated	
Pedro Ríos	Advanced	Eliminated		
Jorge Jofre	Eliminated			
