= Monteiro (disambiguation) =

Monteiro is a municipality in Paraíba, Brazil.

Monteiro may also refer to:

== Animals ==
- Monteiro's bushshrike
- Monteiro's hornbill
- Monteiro's storm petrel

== Places ==
- Gabriel Monteiro, a municipality in São Paulo
- Jerônimo Monteiro, a municipality in Espírito Santo
- Monteiro Lobato, São Paulo, a municipality in São Paulo

== Other uses ==
- Monteiro (surname)

== See also ==
- Montero (name), the Spanish version of this surname
