= Montero (name) =

Montero is a Spanish surname meaning the occupational name for a beater or other assistant at a hunt, from an agent derivative of monte, which, as well as meaning 'mountain', 'hill'. Notable people with the surname include:

- Adalí Montero (born 1982), Peruvian singer-songwriter
- Amaia Montero (born 1976), Spanish singer-songwriter
- Carlos Caridad Montero (born 1967), Venezuelan film director
- Edgardo Abdala Montero (born 1978), Palestinian-Chilean footballer
- Elehuris Montero (born 1998), Dominican baseball player
- Enrique Montero (born 1954), Spanish footballer
- Fredy Montero (born 1987), Colombian soccer player
- Gabriela Montero (born 1970), Venezuelan-American classical piano virtuoso
- Irene Montero (born 1988), Spanish politician and psychologist
- Jefferson Montero (born 1989), Ecuadorian footballer
- Jesús Montero (1989–2025), Venezuelan baseball player
- Juan Esteban Montero (1879–1948), Chilean president (1931–1932)
- Juan Manuel Montero Vázquez (1947–2012), Spanish military physician and Surgeon General
- Keider Montero (born 2000), Venezuelan baseball player
- Leonardo Montero, Argentine TV host
- Mayra Montero (born 1952), Cuban-Puerto Rican writer
- Miguel Montero (born 1983), Venezuelan-American baseball player
- Miguel Montero (tango singer) (1922–1975), Argentine tango singer
- Pablo Montero (born 1974), Mexican singer and actor
- Paolo Montero (born 1971), Uruguayan footballer
- Pilar Montero (1921–2012), American bar and restaurant owner
- Rafael Montero (disambiguation), several people
- Ricardo Montero (referee) (born 1979), Costa Rican football referee
- Ricardo Montero (cyclist) (1902–1974), Spanish racing cyclist
- Rosa Montero (born 1951), Spanish writer

Fictional characters with the surname include:

- Elena Montero de la Vega, a character from The Mask of Zorro and The Legend of Zorro, portrayed by Catherine Zeta-Jones

Montero can also be used as a given name. Notable people with the given name include:

- Montero Lamar Hill (born 1999), American rapper and singer-songwriter, known as Lil Nas X

== See also ==
- Monteiro (surname), the Portuguese version of this surname
