= Charles Monteiro =

São Toméan footballer

Personal information
- Full name: Charles Pereira Mendes Monteiro
- Date of birth: 25 May 1994 (age 32)
- Place of birth: São Tomé, São Tomé and Príncipe
- Height: 1.80 m (5 ft 11 in)
- Position: Left back

Team information
- Current team: Vilafranquense

Youth career
- 2010–2013: Sacavenense

Senior career*
Years	Team	Apps	(Gls)
2013–	Vilafranquense	70	(3)

International career^{‡}
2016–	São Tomé and Príncipe	1	(0)
- * Club domestic league appearances and goals as of 22 May 2016 ‡ National team caps and goals as of 4 June 2016

Charles Pereira Mendes Monteiro (born 25 May 1994) is a São Toméan footballer who plays for Portuguese club Vilafranquense as a left back.

== Club career ==
Born in São Tomé, Monteiro made his senior debuts in 2013 with Vilafranquense in the Lisbon FA Honour Division.

== International career ==
Monteiro made his debut for São Tomé and Príncipe on 4 June 2016 in a 2017 Africa Cup of Nations qualification 1-2 loss against Cape Verde.
