= Hugo Monteiro =

Portuguese footballer

Personal information
- Full name: Hugo Rogério Ferreira Monteiro
- Date of birth: 9 May 1985 (age 41)
- Place of birth: Porto, Portugal
- Height: 1.76 m (5 ft 9 in)
- Position: Winger

Youth career
- 1993–1995: Porto
- 1996–1997: Francos
- 1998–1999: Candal
- 1999–2004: Boavista

Senior career*
| Years | Team | Apps | (Gls) |
| 2004–2008 | Boavista | 27 | (0) |
| 2004 | → Paredes (loan) | 15 | (1) |
| 2005 | → União Lamas (loan) | 17 | (4) |
| 2008–2009 | Gil Vicente | 20 | (4) |
| 2009–2010 | Gondomar | 26 | (4) |
| 2010–2016 | Arouca | 63 | (4) |
| 2015 | → Leixões (loan) | 11 | (1) |
| 2016 | → Anadia (loan) | 9 | (1) |
| Total | | 188 | (19) |

International career
| 2000 | Portugal U16 | 1 | (0) |
| 2001–2002 | Portugal U17 | 8 | (1) |
| 2002–2003 | Portugal U18 | 4 | (0) |
| 2003–2004 | Portugal U19 | 8 | (2) |
| 2004–2005 | Portugal U20 | 4 | (0) |
- * Club domestic league appearances and goals

Hugo Rogério Ferreira Monteiro (born 9 May 1985 in Porto; Portuguese pronunciation: [ˈuɡu mõˈtɐjɾu]) is a Portuguese retired professional footballer who played as a winger.

== Club career ==
A product of local Boavista FC's youth system, Monteiro made his first-team debut during 2003–04, playing six minutes in a 2–1 home win against C.S. Marítimo for his only Primeira Liga appearance of the season. He split the following campaign between two teams, U.S.C. Paredes and C.F. União de Lamas, both in the third division and in both cases on loan.

Upon his return to the Porto-based club, Monteiro made only a further 26 league appearances for the Axadrezados (chequereds) in three seasons combined, 16 of those coming in 2006–07. In the summer of 2008, following Boavista's top flight relegation, he was sold to another side in the second level, Gil Vicente FC.

In 2010, after one season in division three with Gondomar SC, Monteiro returned to the second tier with F.C. Arouca, appearing in just seven matches in his first year as the team managed to retain their newly acquired status.
