= Adalí Montero =

Peruvian singer-songwriter (born 1982)

- Born: Adalí Montero Ulfe; 5 May 1982 (age 44); Lima, Peru
- Genres: Blues, rock, funk
- Occupation: Singer-songwriter
- Instrument: Voice
- Years active: 1999–present
- Label: Independent
- Website: adalimontero.com

Adalí Montero Ulfe (b. 6 May 1982) is a Peruvian singer-songwriter. For over 15 years, she has sung in the genres of blues, rock, funk. Montero began her career after Gerardo Manuel and joined the band El Humo. She has performed with Jean Paul Strauss, Jaime Cuadra, Pochi Marambio, El Ego, Los Dickens, Julio Andrade, Chaqueta Piaggio, Manuel Miranda, Cristina Valentina, and Sylvia Falcón, among others. Montero would also lead a short-lived stint in TV as a vocal coach and appearing on the Mexican comedy show Parodiando.

== Biography ==
Adalí Montero Ulfe began her career when she met Gerardo Manuel at a Karaoke club and impressed him with her cover of Piece of My Heart and she joined his band, El Humo, from 1999 to 2002. Montero, along with Shantal Onetto, Gisela Ponce de León and Gachi Rivero, performed in the Rocío Tovar musical play Feisbuk (Facebook), a parody of modern adolescent romance.

In 2011, she officially debuted as a musician with the release of her album Volver after two years of work.

Montero was one of the Academy Staff for the Peruvian version of Operación Triunfo.

In 2016, Montero found herself the victim of groping by two men in the backseat of a taxi in the La Victoria district of Lima, Peru.
