= Darci (footballer, born 1968) =

Brazilian footballer (1968–2018)

Darci Miguel Monteiro
Personal information
- Date of birth: 26 September 1968
- Place of birth: Volta Redonda, Brazil
- Date of death: 3 January 2018 (aged 49)
- Place of death: Rio de Janeiro, Brazil
- Height: 1.79 m (5 ft 10 in)
- Position: Striker

Senior career*
Years	Team	Apps	(Gls)
1993	Volta Redonda		
1994	Os Belenenses	2	(0)
1994	Volta Redonda		
1994–1995	Os Belenenses	17	(1)
1996	Rochester Raging Rhinos	11	(2)
1997–1998	Felgueiras	15	(1)
1999	Olaria		
1999	Al-Ittihad		
2000–2001	Antalyaspor	7	(0)
2001	Fluminense		
2002	Fortaleza		
2002–2003	Widzew Łódź	21	(0)
2004	Olaria		
2004	Sabah		
2004	Paranoá		
2005	Paniliakos	9	(0)
2006	Rayyan		(1)
2006	Aragua		
- * Club domestic league appearances and goals

Darci Miguel Monteiro (26 September 1968 – 3 January 2018), also known as Darci, was a Brazilian professional footballer who played as a striker for several clubs in Brazil, Europe, and Asia, including Fluminense, CF Os Belenenses, Antalyaspor, and Widzew Łódź.
