= A Capital =

Newspaper in Lisbon, Portugal, between 1968 and 2005

- Type: Daily newspaper
- Founded: 1 February 1968
- Ceased publication: 30 July 2005
- Political alignment: Populist
- Headquarters: Lisbon

A Capital (meaning The Capital [City] in English) was a Portuguese afternoon newspaper published in Lisbon, Portugal, between 1968 and 2005.

== History and profile ==
A Capital was first published on 21 February 1968. The paper was established as a result of the editorial conflicts in the daily newspaper Diário Popular.

A Capital had a populist stance. Before the Carnation Revolution the paper was owned by different companies, including the Banco Espírito e Comercial de Lisboa, CUF, Tabaqueira and Sorel. The paper was nationalized following the revolution. A Capital was purchased by Prensa Ibérica in 2001.

A Capital ceased publication on 30 July 2005.
