= Antônio Roberto Monteiro Simões =

Portuguese and Spanish linguist

Antônio Roberto Monteiro Simões is a Brazilian-born linguist. His research focuses on the phonetics and phonology of Romance languages. Simões is a professor of Spanish and Portuguese linguistics at the University of Kansas, where he teaches Hispanic linguistics. He has authored books, textbooks and articles contrasting the Portuguese and Spanish languages.

== Career ==
Simões earned a B.A. at Central College, after withdrawing from the Universidade Federal do Espírito Santo, Vitória, Brazil. He earned his Ph.D. at the University of Texas at Austin in 1987. Prior to coming to Austin, Simões studied at the University of Provence, in Aix-en-Provence, France; and the University of North Carolina at Chapel Hill.

== Research ==
Simões studies speech models and foreign language learning models, especially in relation to phonetics and phonology. Simões work on modeling is a continuation of his Ph.D. thesis; an adaptation of the late Dennis Klatt's 1976 pioneering model to predict duration in connected speech.

== Selected works ==
=== Books ===
- Pois não : Brazilian Portuguese course for Spanish speakers, with basic reference grammar. Austin: University of Texas Press. 2008. ISBN 978-0-292-71781-7.
- Teschner, Richard and Antônio R.M. Simões 2007. Brazilian Portuguese Pronunciation. Baltimore, Maryland: LivroText. (ISBN 0942566939; ISBN 9780942566932) http://lbr.uwpress.org/content/45/1/214.citation; https://www.amazon.ca/Pronouncing-Brazilian-Portuguese-Richard-Teschner/dp/0942566939
- Simões, Antônio R.M.; Ana Maria Carvalho, Lyris Wiedemann (eds.) (2004). Português para falantes de espanhol: Artigos selecionados escritos em português e inglês. Campinas, Spain: Pontes. ISBN 978-85-7113-201-6.
- Simões, A.R.M. 1992. Com licença! Brazilian Portuguese for Spanish speakers. Austin, TX: University of Texas Press and Institute of Latin American Studies (Second reprint 1997). (ISBN 978-0-292-77677-7; ISBN 978-0-292-71142-6)
- Dale A. Koike and Antônio R.M. Simões, eds. 1989. Negotiating for meaning: papers on foreign language teaching and testing. Austin, TX: Department of Foreign Language Education Studies.

=== Articles ===
- Simões, A.R.M. 2006. Clitic Attachment in Brazilian Portuguese, in Hispania, vol. 89, no. 2, 380-389. dialnet.unirioja.es/servlet/articulo?codigo=1977683
- Simões, A.R.M. and E.C. Papanastasiou, 2002. Evaluating the usefulness and properties of a subjective assessment of Brazilian Portuguese. In Hispania, 85.3:618-28, September 2002. https://www.jstor.org/stable/4141151
- Simões, A.R.M. 1996. Duration as an element of lexical stress in Spanish discourse: An acoustical analysis. Hispanic Linguistics, vol. 8/2, 352-368. sequence of article published in 1992, “The phonetics of discourse: strong syllable positions in Mexican Spanish and Brazilian Portuguese.” In Proceedings of the workshop on prosody in natural speech.
- Simões, A.R.M. 1996. Assessing the contribution of instructional technology in the teaching of pronunciation. Proceedings of the Fourth International Conference on Spoken Language Processing, Philadelphia, PA, University of Delaware and Alfred I. duPont Institute, III, 843-46. https://ieeexplore.ieee.org/xpls/abs_all.jsp?arnumber=607891&tag=1
- Simões, A.R.M. 1996. Phonetics in Second Language Acquisition: an acoustic study of fluency in adult learners of Spanish. In Hispania, 1, 79:825-33.
- Simões, A.R.M. 1992. The phonetics of discourse: strong syllable positions in Mexican Spanish and Brazilian Portuguese. In Proceedings of the workshop on prosody in natural speech. Philadelphia: Institute for Research in Cognitive Sciences.
- Simões, A.R.M. 1991. Modeling shortening and lengthening in connected speech. In 1990 Mid-America linguistic conference papers, Frances Ingemann, editor. Lawrence, KS: Department of Linguistics, University of Kansas, 355-62.
- Simões, A.R.M. 1991. Towards a phonetics of discourse. In Cadernos de estudos lingüísticos—IEL. Campinas, Brazil: UNICAMP, 21, 59-78. (amplified version of article published in 1991, Modeling shortening and lengthening in connected speech. 1990 Mid-America Linguistic Conference Paper)
- Simões, A.R.M. and Orlando R. Kelm 1991. O processo de aquisição das vogais semi-abertas "é, ó" do português (brasileiro) como língua estrangeira. In Hispania, 74, 3, 654-65.

=== Book reviews ===
- Simões, A.R.M. 2011. Review of Leow, Ronald P., Héctor Campos, and Donna Lardière (Eds.). Little Words: Their History, Phonology, Syntax, Semantics, Pragmatics, and Acquisition. Washington, DC: Georgetown University Press, 2009. 246 pages. In Modern Language Association. http://onlinelibrary.wiley.com/doi/10.1111/j.1540-4781.2011.01212_3.x/abstract
- Simões, A.R.M. 2011. Review of Português para falantes de espanhol – Ensino e Aquisição, Portuguese for Spanish Speakers – Teaching and Acquisition, Lyris Wiedemann and Matilde V.R. Scaramucci, organizers/editors, Campinas, São Paulo: Pontes Editores, 2008. In Hispania.
