= Gerardo Manuel =

- Born: Gerardo Manuel Rojas Rodó; August 18, 1946; Lima, Peru
- Died: July 4, 2020 (aged 73) Lima, Peru
- Genres: Rock, Garage rock
- Occupations: Musician, TV host
- Instruments: Vocals, saxophone, drums
- Years active: 1963–2014

Gerardo Manuel Rojas Rodó (18 August 1946 – 4 July 2020), known as Gerardo Manuel, was a Peruvian rock musician and TV host. He was a member of bands like Los Shain's and Gerardo Manuel y el Humo.

He is also known for his TV show Disco Club. This program played music videos in Peru during the 1970s and 1980s.

== Biography ==
=== Early life ===
He was born in the district of Breña in Lima in 1946. His mother was a singer and his father was in the navy. He started to listen to classical music as a child. Later, his family moved to Ica. He studied at the San Luis Gónzaga school and played the saxophone.

=== Music career ===
In Ica, he worked on a radio show called Surf Beat 63. He started a band called Los Doltons with friends. He played the saxophone and drums. The band played twist music.

In 1964, he returned to Lima. He studied at the National University of San Marcos. He joined the band Los Doltons again in Lima, but later he left the group.

In 1965, he joined the band Los Shain's and was the singer. The band recorded four albums between 1965 and 1968. He also appeared in a Mexican movie called Las sicodélicas.

After Los Shain's ended in 1968, he formed a new group called The (St. Thomas) Pepper Smelter. Later, in 1970, he created the band Gerardo Manuel y El Humo. He recorded albums with the label Iempsa and El Virrey.

=== Television career ===
In June 1978, he started a TV show called Disco Club on TV Perú (channel 7). The show broadcast music videos. It became a daily show in November 1978.

The show was very popular. On 8 December 1980, the show had high ratings when he did a special about John Lennon after his murder. Some sources say Disco Club was one of the first music video shows in the world, before MTV. The program aired on open television until 1995.

=== Later years and death ===
In 2010, he had a stroke. He recovered but was diagnosed with Parkinson's disease. In 2011, the Ministry of Culture gave him an award for his work in Peruvian culture.

Gerardo Manuel died in Lima on 4 July 2020 due to complications from Parkinson's disease.

== Discography ==
With Los Shain's

- El ritmo de los Shain's (1965)
- Segundo volumen (1967)
- Docena tres (1968)
- Instrumental's (1968)

With The (St. Thomas) Pepper Smelter

- Soul & Pepper (1969)

With Gerardo Manuel y el Humo

- Apocallypsis (1970)
- Machu Picchu 2000 (1971)
- ¿Quién es el mayor? (1973)
