= Igreja dos Anjos =

Church in Lisbon, Portugal

Church of Our Lady of the Angels
- Igreja de Nossa Senhora dos Anjos
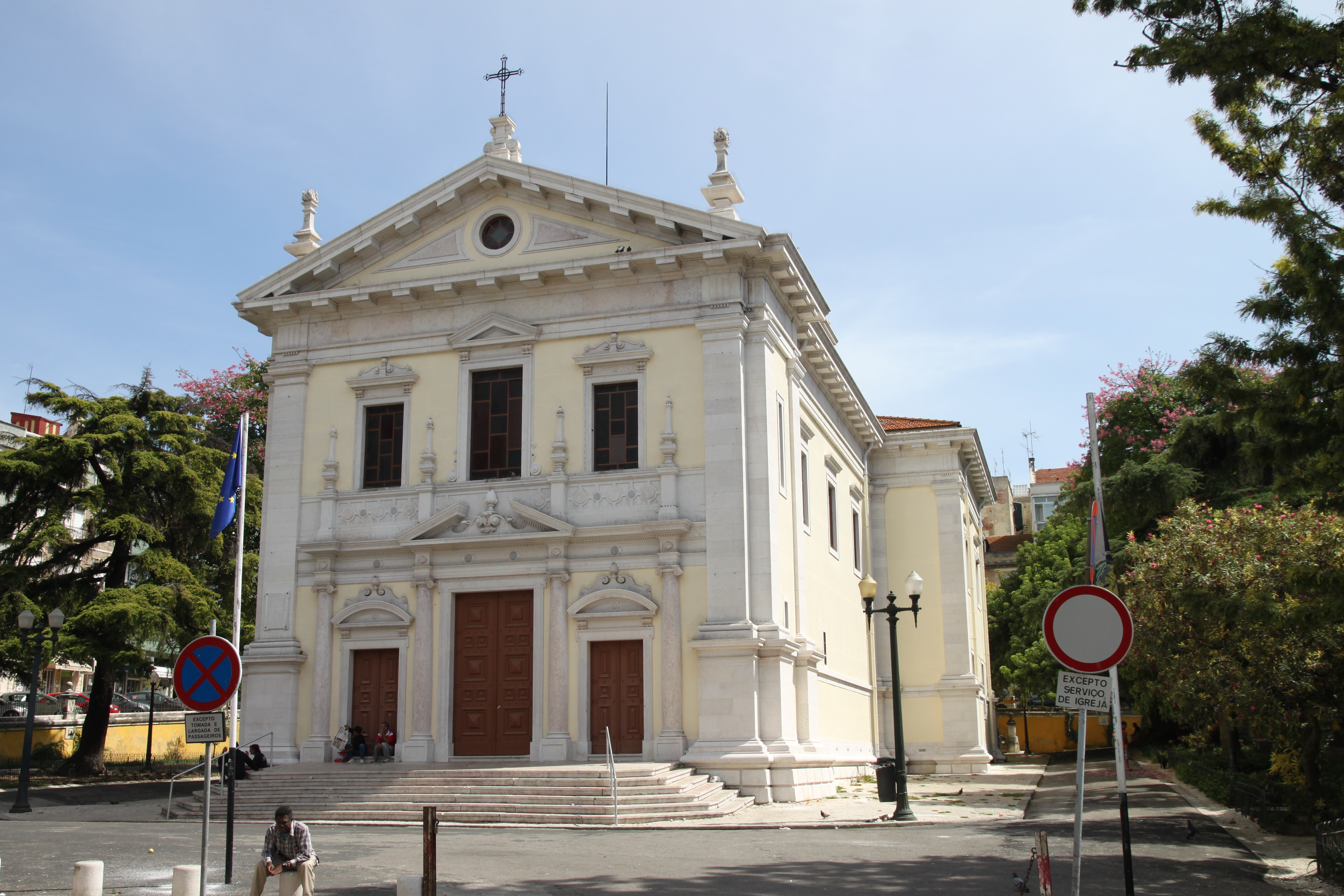
- Main façade of Anjos Church, seen from Avenida Almirante Reis

- Location on a map of Lisbon

Religion
- Affiliation: Roman Catholic
- Rite: Latin Rite
- Patron: Our Lady of the Angels
- Status: Parish church

Location
- Location: Avenida Almirante Reis, 1170-286 Lisboa
- Interactive map of Church of Our Lady of the Angels
- Administration: Patriarchate of Lisbon
- Coordinates: 38°43′28.21″N 9°8′4.27″W

Architecture
- Architect: José Luis Monteiro
- Style: Baroque, Neoclassical
- Established: c. 1563 (original church)
- Groundbreaking: 18 February 1889 (current church)
- Completed: 1911 (current church)
- Demolished: 1908 (original church)
- Portuguese National Monument
- Official name: Igreja Paroquial de Nossa Senhora dos Anjos
- Designated: Property of Public Interest (Imóvel de Interesse Público); 6 March 1996
- Reference no.: PT031106060191

The Church of Our Lady of the Angels (Portuguese: Igreja de Nossa Senhora dos Anjos), more commonly known simply as Igreja dos Anjos [iˈɣɾɐʒɐ ðuz ˈɐ̃ʒuʃ], is a Roman Catholic parish church located in Lisbon, Portugal.

== History ==
The parish of Anjos was created by Cardinal Henry of Portugal, splitting the territory from that of the large Santa Justa parish. The seat of the newly created parish was a small chapel (ermida) under the invocation of Our Lady of Angels — this small chapel was later enlarged in the 17th century, during the reign of King Philip III of Portugal.

From 1579 up to the 1820s, when it ceased due to the lack of means, the church had collegiate status; the college of canons consisted of 11 chaplains who maintained the daily office of worship.

The original church was demolished in 1908 in order to make way for a major thoroughfare, Avenida D. Amélia (named after Queen Amélie of Orléans; renamed Avenida Almirante Reis shortly after the 5 October 1910 revolution, honouring one of the Republican revolutionaries). The church was rebuilt on the western side of the avenue, by architect José Luis Monteiro: Monteiro respected the proportions of the original church, but gave it a more pronounced Neoclassical façade. The 17th- and 18th-century Baroque interiors of the original church were fully preserved and transferred to the new one, and can still be observed today; some of the paintings are even older, both a panel by Mannerist painter Diogo Teixeira depicting Saint Irene healing the wounds of Saint Sebastian, and a rare painting of Saint Anthony of Lisbon (in the sacristy) date back to the 16th century.
