= Rafael Montero =

Rafael Montero may refer to:

- Rafael Montero (baseball) (born 1990), Dominican baseball pitcher
- Rafael Montero (film director) (born 1953), Mexican film director
- Rafael Montero (cyclist) (1913–1962), Chilean cyclist
