= José Hipólito Monteiro =

Portuguese geologist and oceanographer

José Hipólito da Costa Monteiro (Lisbon, Portugal, 18 February 1939), is a geologist and oceanographer who excelled as a Portuguese pioneer of marine geology. J. H. Monteiro main fields of scientific research were sedimentology dynamics of the continental shelf and coastal records, maritime geological maps. Other scientific interests including Environmental marine geology, application of autonomous underwater vehicles, deep-sea polymetallic sandstones and the Law of the Sea.

== Biography ==
J. H. Monteiro graduated at the Scripps Institution of Oceanography in 1966, after graduating in Geological Sciences at the University of Lisbon. Having returned to Portugal, he began his professional career as a research geologist for the Portuguese Navy. Since 1971, he worked for the Portuguese Geological Survey first as petroleum division geologist, and then in Applied Geology and Marine Geology. There over a decade, from 1987 and 1997 he headed the Marine Geology Department. From 2003/2004 he was Vice Chairman of ECORD (European Consortium for Ocean Research Drilling). He also taught Environmental and Marine Geology at the Universities of Aveiro, Évora and the New University of Lisbon.
