= Rui Monteiro (footballer, born 1991) =

Portuguese footballer

Personal information
- Full name: Rui Nuno Paulo Monteiro
- Date of birth: 6 January 1991 (age 35)
- Place of birth: Sintra, Portugal
- Height: 1.81 m (5 ft 11 in)
- Position: Midfielder

Youth career
- 1999–2000: Mucifalense
- 2000–2005: Benfica
- 2005–2006: Sporting Lourel
- 2006–2010: Belenenses

Senior career*
Years	Team	Apps	(Gls)
2010–2011	Casa Pia	19	(1)
2011–2013	Marítimo B	22	(1)
2013–2017	Sintrense	120	(34)
2017	Torreense	9	(1)
2018–2019	Lusitanos Saint-Maur	25	(2)
- * Club domestic league appearances and goals as of 10 November 2019

Rui Nuno Paulo Monteiro (born 6 January 1991) is a Portuguese professional footballer who plays as a midfielder.

== Club career ==
Monteiro was born in Sintra, Lisbon District. He all but spent his senior career in Portugal in the third division, where he represented Casa Pia AC, S.U. Sintrense and S.C.U. Torreense.

The exception to this was in the 2012–13 season, when Monteiro appeared in five matches for C.S. Marítimo's reserve team in the Segunda Liga. He made his debut in the competition on 22 August 2012, playing the entire 1–0 away loss against U.D. Oliveirense.

In the 2018 January transfer window, Monteiro signed with French Championnat National 2 club US Lusitanos Saint-Maur.
