= José Luís Monteiro =

Portuguese architect

José Luis Monteiro
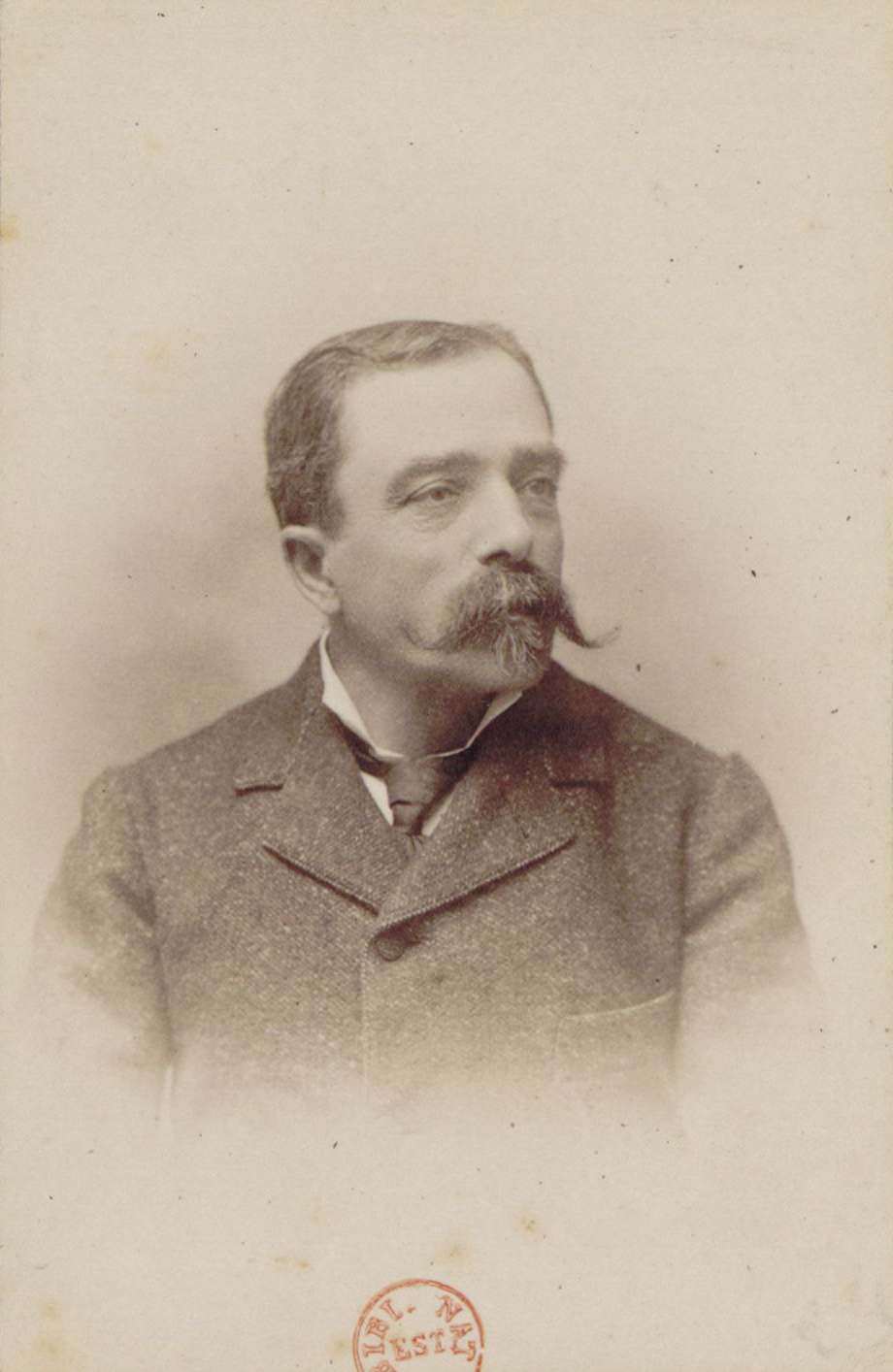
- Born: 25 October 1848; Lisbon, Portugal
- Died: 27 January 1942 (aged 93); Campo de Ourique, Portugal
- Occupation: Architect

José Luis Monteiro (1848–1942) was a Portuguese architect. His work is considered among the most influential within late 19th century architecture.

== Life ==
José Luis Monteiro was born in Lisbon, Portugal on 25 October 1848. At age 12, Monteiro enrolled in the Royal Academy of Fine Arts in Lisbon. In 1873 he moved to Paris to attend the École nationale supérieure des Beaux-Arts in Paris, completing his degree under the mentorship of Jean Louis-Pascal in 1879.

In 1880, Monteiro returned to Portugal where he assumed a role as chief architect for the Lisbon City Council, in addition to a teaching position at the city's Royal Academy of Fine Arts, where he originally trained. In 1901 he was awarded the Legion of Honor.

Monteiro died on 27 January 1942 in Campo de Ourique, Portugal.

== Work ==
Monteiro utilized a number of different architectural styles including Neoclassicism and French Second Empire. He is most well known for his revolutionary use of metal in the interior Rossio Railway Station; the building contained one of the first iron vaults in the nation.

=== Notable projects ===
- Hôtel de Ville (reconstruction), Paris, 1874
- Rossio Railway Station, Lisbon, 1886
- Liceu Nacional Passos Manuel, Lisbon, 1881
- Hotel Avenida Palace, Lisbon, 1890
- Igreja dos Anjos, Lisbon, 1908
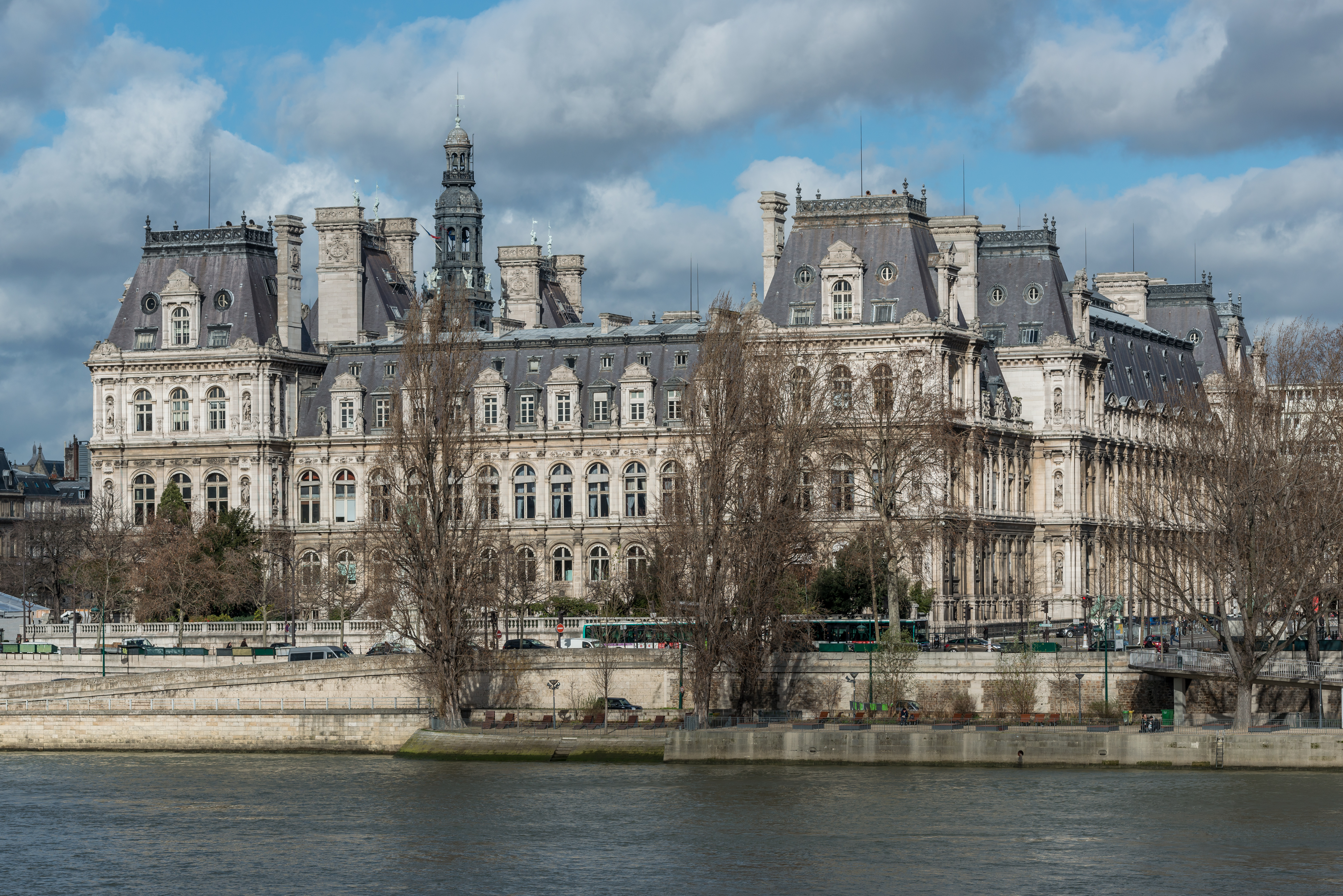
Hôtel de Ville, Paris, 1874

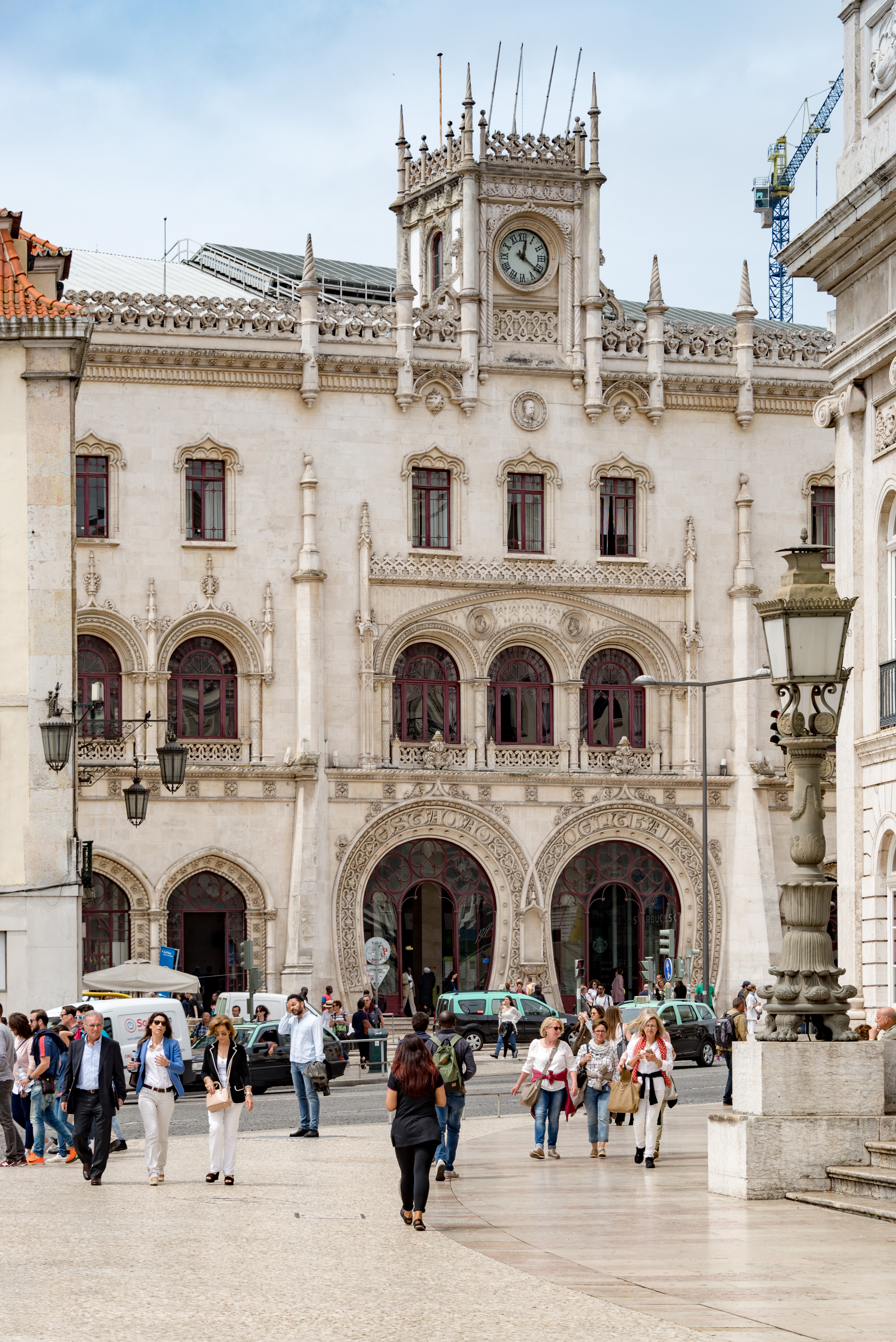
Estação Rossio, Lisbon, 1886

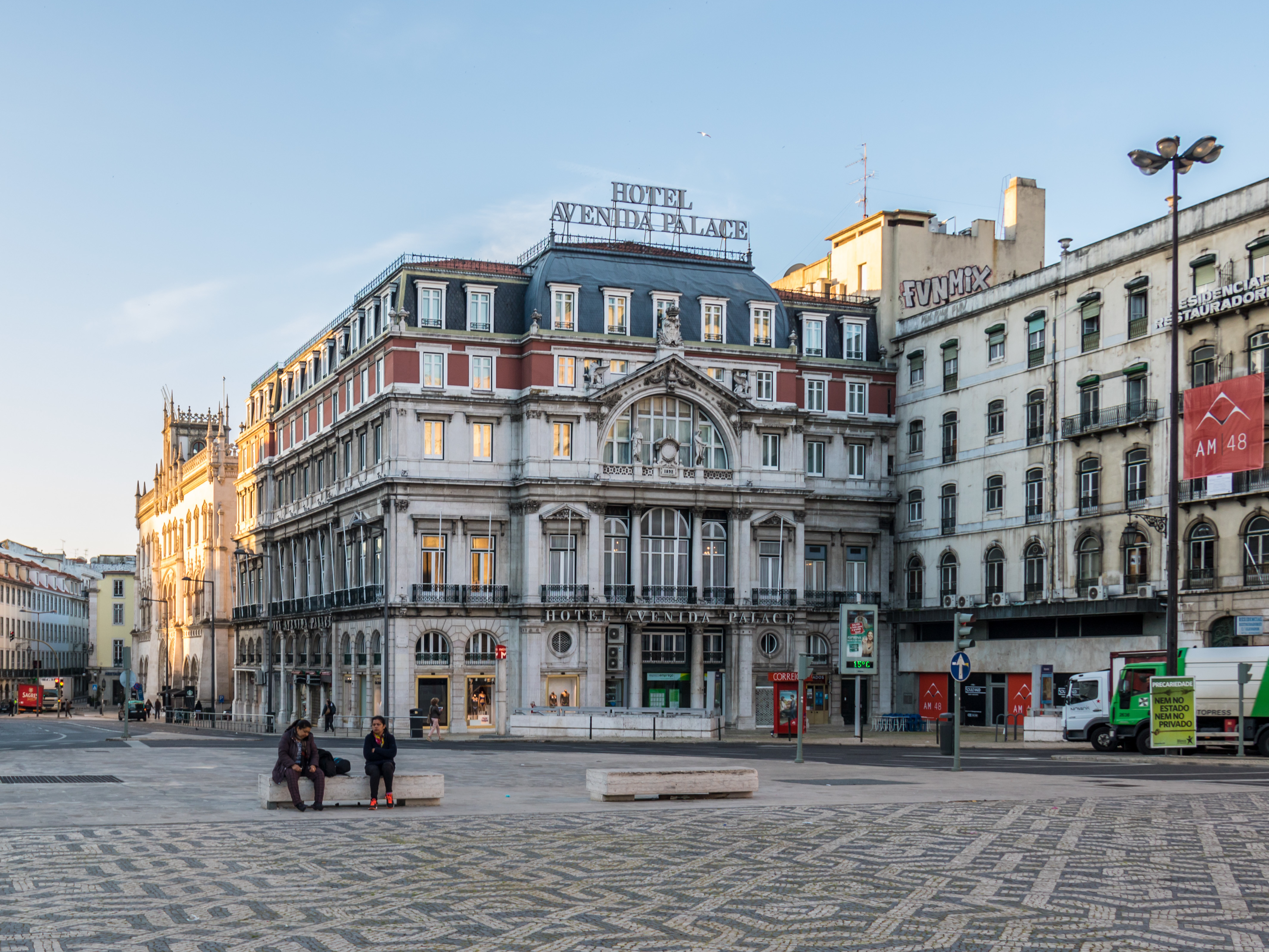
Hotel Avenida Palace, Lisbon, 1890

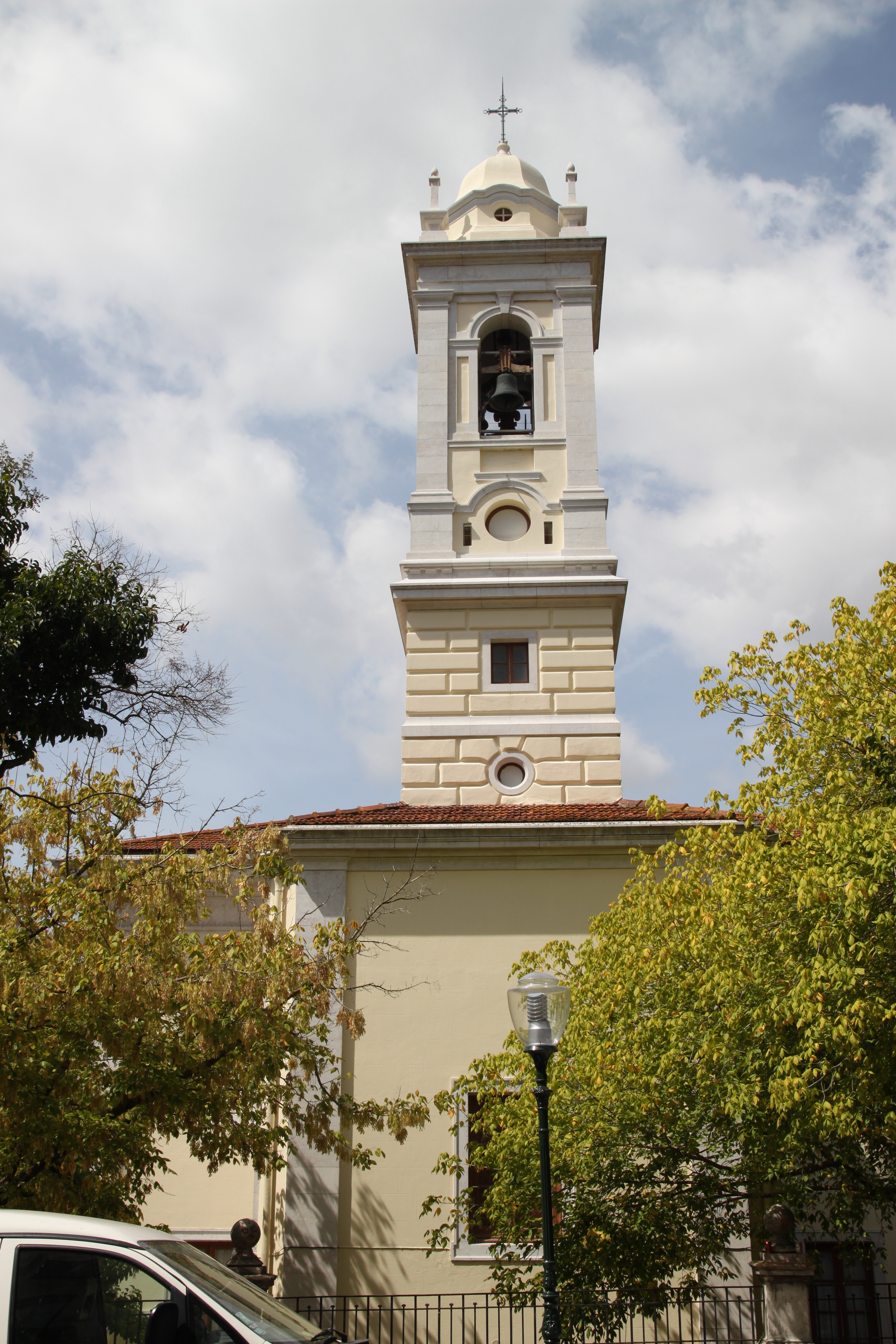
Igreja dos Anjos, Lisbon, 1908
