= Rafael Silva (footballer, born 1984) =

Brazilian footballer

Personal information
- Full name: Rafael Monteiro Alves da Silva
- Date of birth: 25 January 1984 (age 42)
- Place of birth: Presidente Prudente, Brazil
- Height: 1.81 m (5 ft 11 1/2 in)
- Position: Defender

Senior career*
Years	Team	Apps	(Gls)
2007–2008	Olímpia		
2008	→ Rio Preto (loan)		
2008	Juventus		
2009	América–SP		
2009	Guaratinguetá		
2010	São Bernardo		
2010	→ Gama (loan)		
2011	Comercial		
2011	Marília		
2012	União Barbarense		
2012	São Bento		
2013	União Barbarense		
2013	São Bento		
2014	Nacional–MG		
2015	São José		
- * Club domestic league appearances and goals as of 2 March 2017

Rafael Monteiro Alves da Silva (born January 25, 1984, in Presidente Prudente), known as Rafael Silva, is a Brazilian footballer who plays as defender.

== Career statistics ==
As of 2 March 2017

Club	Season	League			State League		Cup		Conmebol		Other		Total	
Club	Season	Division	Apps	Goals	Apps	Goals	Apps	Goals	Apps	Goals	Apps	Goals	Apps	Goals
Rio Preto	2008	Paulista	—		6	0	—		—		—		6	0
Juventus	2008	Paulista	—		—		—		—		8 (Note: All appearance(s) in Copa Paulista)	0	8	0
América–SP	2009	Paulista A2	—		17	1	—		—		—		17	1
Guaratinguetá	2009	Série C	12	0	—		—		—		—		12	0
São Bernardo	2010	Paulista A2	—		21	1	—		—		—		21	1
Gama	2010	Série C	4	0	—		—		—		—		4	0
Comercial	2011	Paulista A2	—		7	0	—		—		—		7	0
Marília	2011	Série C	1	1	—		—		—		—		1	1
União Barbarense	2012	Paulista A2	—		20	0	—		—		—		20	0
São Bento	2013	Paulista A3	—		—		—		—		7	0	7	0
União Barbarense	2013	Paulista	—		16	0	—		—		—		16	0
São Bento	2012	Paulista A3	—		—		—		—		14	0	14	0
Nacional–MG	2014	Mineiro	—		10	0	—		—		—		10	0
União Barbarense	2015	Paulista A3	—		15	4	—		—		—		15	4
Career total			17	1	112	6	0	0	0	0	29	0	158	7
