= Njeim =

Njeim, also spelled Noujaim is a Lebanese Maronite Christian surname meaning "small star". The family originated in Jaj before migrating to the Kisrawan region in the 15th century. They settled in Bkerke or Ghosta before moving to Kfertay, from there they expanded to Sahel Alma, Duris and Rachiine. Notable people with the surname include:

- Chirine Njeim (born 1984), Lebanese alpine skier and long-distance runner
- Fares D. Noujaim, Lebanese-American banker
- Jean Njeim (1915–1971), Lebanese Army general
- Jehane Noujaim, (born c. 1980), Egyptian-American documentary film director
- Guy-Paul Noujaim, (born 1935), Lebanese Maronite Catholic eparch and emeritus Auxiliary Bishop
- Nadine Wilson Njeim (born 1988), Lebanese beauty queen
- Nadine Nassib Njeim (born 1984), Lebanese actress
- Selim Noujaim, American politician from Connecticut
- Ziad Noujeim (born 1958), Lebanese journalist and oral surgeon

== See also ==
- Najm
- Noujaim
