= Ulrich Landvreugd =

Dutch football manager (born 1971)

Personal information
- Date of birth: 7 November 1971 (age 54)
- Place of birth: Amsterdam, Netherlands
- Position: Midfielder

Youth career
- Ajax

Senior career*
Years	Team	Apps	(Gls)
1992–1994	SC Cambuur		
1995	Ipswich Town	0	(0)
1996–2005	AFC		
2005–2006	AFC '34		

International career
1986	Netherlands U15	1	(0)

Managerial career
- 2003–2004: AFC U19
- 2004–2008: SC Voorland
- 2008–2010: ASV De Dijk
- 2010–2012: SVW '27
- 2012: Blauw-Wit Amsterdam
- 2014: Barnet (joint)
- 2014–2017: Eemdijk
- 2017–2018: Hooglanderveen
- 2018–2022: AFC
- 2024: Telstar (caretaker)
- 2024–2026: Den Bosch
- * Club domestic league appearances and goals

Ulrich Landvreugd (born 7 November 1971) is a Dutch professional football manager and former player who was most recently the head coach of Eerste Divisie club FC Den Bosch.

== Playing career ==
Landvreugd began his career in the youth academy at Ajax before joining SC Cambuur in 1992 and then Ipswich Town three years later, though he only played for the reserves there. At the age of 24, he suffered a knee injury that curtailed his professional career. He later played in amateur football for Amsterdamsche FC, ASV De Dijk and AFC '34.

== Coaching career ==
Landvreugd managed ASV De Dijk, SC Voorland, SVW '27 and Blauw-Wit Amsterdam in Dutch amateur football. In October 2012, he joined Barnet as assistant manager to Edgar Davids. After the departure of Davids in January 2014, Landvreugd and first-team coach Dick Schreuder were appointed as joint managers on 23 January. The duo lost their jobs to Martin Allen on 19 March after four straight losses, and returned to a first team coaching role. He left Barnet on 16 April 2014.

Landvreugd subsequently took charge of Eemdijk from Bunschoten-Spakenburg, who competed in the Saturday Hoofdklasse B, and remained at the club until 2017. That year, he was appointed head coach of Hooglanderveen, competing in the Sunday Tweede Klasse.

In July 2018, he was appointed head coach of AFC, a club playing in the Tweede Divisie. In his first season, he led the team to the league title. In January 2021, Landvreugd was admitted to the UEFA Pro Licence course by the KNVB, and as part of the program, he undertook an internship as assistant coach at Telstar. That same month, AFC announced that Landvreugd had extended his contract through mid-2022. He completed his UEFA Pro diploma in July 2022.

For the 2022–23 and 2023–24 seasons, Landvreugd served as assistant coach at Telstar, competing in the Eerste Divisie. Following the departure of head coach Mike Snoei, he was promoted to interim head coach alongside Anthony Correia for the remainder of the 2023–24 campaign.

On 30 April 2024, Landvreugd was announced as the new assistant coach to David Nascimento at FC Den Bosch, with the appointment taking effect on 1 July 2024. Following Nascimento's dismissal on 11 November, Landvreugd was promoted to head coach. He led Den Bosch to the promotion play-offs during his first season in charge, where they were eliminated in the semi-finals by his former club, Telstar. On 9 May 2025, Landvreugd's contract with Den Bosch was extended into the 2025–26 season. Landvreugd left Den Bosch at the end of the 2025-26 season by mutual consent.
