= Najm =

Name list

Najm (Arabic: نجم) or Najam (also Negm, IPA: [neɡm] in Egyptian dialect/pronunciation) is an Arabic word meaning Star. It, Najm, is a direct Qurʾanic name for boys and girls that means “star”, “luminary”, “source of inspiration”. The word Najm is mentioned four times in the Qurʾān, and is also the name of chapter 53 of the Qurʾān: Surat an-An-Najm. Najm (or Negm, more common in Egypt) is also an Arab family name.

== People ==
=== Najm ===
- Najm Afandi (1893–1975), Indian Urdu poet
- Najm Hamad Al Ahmad (born 1969), Syrian jurist and politician
- Najm Allal (born 1966), Western Saharan singer, guitarist and writer of lyrics in Spanish
- Najm Hosain Syed (born 1936), Pakistani writer in Punjabi

=== Nagem ===
- Nagem Hatab, Iraqi who died in US custody

=== Najam ===
- Najam Sethi (born 1948), Pakistani journalist, editor, and media personality
- Najam Sheraz (born 1969), Pakistani pop singer, songwriter, and peace activist

=== Najem ===
- Najem Wali (born 1956), Iraqi-German author

=== Nadjim ===
- Nadjim Abdou (born 1984), aka as Jimmy Abdou, Comoros-French footballer, playing in England

=== Najmul ===
- Najmul Hasan (born 1984), Bangladeshi qari (Qur'an reciter)
- Najmul Millat (1863–1938), Indian faqīh (Islamic jurist)

== Surname ==
=== Najm ===
- Abolqasem Najm (1892–1981), Iranian politician, cabinet minister, and diplomat
- Faheem Najm (born 1984), American singer better known as T-Pain
- Kamaran Najm (born 1987), Iraqi photojournalist
- Mohammed Najm (1943–2016), Libyan military officer and political figure

=== Najem ===
- Mohamed Ag Najem, Tuareg rebel leader against government of Mali

=== Najam ===
- Adil Najam, Pakistani-American academic

=== Negm ===
- Ahmed Fouad Negm (1929–2013), Egyptian vernacular poet
- Nawara Negm (born 1973), Egyptian journalist, blogger and human rights activist

== Places ==
- Najmabad (disambiguation), several places
- Najm, Iran, village in Iran
- Shurab-e Najm-e Soheyli, village in Iran
- Najim Jihad, housing compound outside Jalalabad, Afghanistan, where Osama bin Laden lived
- Qal'at Najm, castle in Syria

== Sports ==
- Nedjm Chabab Magra, or NC Magra, Algerian football club
- Najm de Marrakech, Moroccan football club

== Other ==
- An-Najm, (The Star), the 53rd sura of the Qur'an
- Najm is an arabized variant of the Atari 65XE computer sold in the Arab world

== See also ==
- Najim
- Njeim
- Najima (disambiguation)
- Najma (disambiguation)
