= Najim =

Najim is an Arabic given name and a surname meaning "star". It may refer to:

== People ==
=== Given name ===
- Najim (singer), Algerian singer
- Najim Arshad (born 1986), Indian singer
- Najim Haddouchi (born 1997), Dutch footballer
- Najim Haidary (born 1999), Afghan footballer
- Najim Abdullah al-Jubouri, Iraqi Major General and governor
- Najim Laachraoui (1991–2016), Belgian-Moroccan terrorist
- Najim al-Radwan (born 1972), Saudi Arabian weightlifter
- Najim Abdallah Zahwen Al Ujayli, Iraqi general

=== Middle name ===
- Daham Najim Bashir (born 1979), Qatari athlete
- Mohanad Najim Aleqabi (born 1979), Iraqi journalist

=== Surname ===
- Abderahim Najim (born 1954), Moroccan Olympic boxer
- Ali Najim (born 1989), Kuwaiti radio personality
- Daham Najim Bashir (born 1979), Kenyan-born Qatari runner
- Haidar Najim (born 1967), Iraqi footballer
- Harvey Najim (born 1940), American businessman
- M. M. M. Najim, a Vice Chancellor of the South Eastern University of Sri Lanka
- Mohammed Najim, Iraqi footballer
- Samir Abdul Aziz al-Najim (born c. 1937), Iraqi politician

== See also ==
- Najim Jihad, housing compound
- Najm
- Njeim
- Najima (disambiguation)
