= 1985–86 KNVB Cup =

Tournament details
- Country: Netherlands
- Teams: 64

Final positions
- Champions: Ajax
- Runners-up: RBC

Tournament statistics
- Top goal scorer: Guus van der Borgt (7)

The 1985–86 KNVB Cup was the 68th edition of the Dutch national football annual knockout tournament for the KNVB Cup. 46 teams contested, beginning on 9 October 1985 and ending at the final on 28 May 1986, at De Meer Stadion in Amsterdam.

Ajax beating RBC 3–0.

== Teams ==
- All 18 participants of the Eredivisie 1985-86
- All 19 participants of the Eerste Divisie 1985-86
- 27 teams from lower (amateur) leagues

== First round ==
9. 12, 1 and 30 October 1985
Ajax _{E}	3–0	Sparta _{E}
ASWH _{A}	2–1	FC Emmen _{1}
AVW'66_{A}	1–3	NEC _{E}
De Bataven_{A}	0–2	VVOG _{A}
DETO_{A}	2–8	HFC Haarlem _{E}
DHC_{A}	0–1	FC Twente _{E}
VV Drachten _{A}	1–6	FC Volendam _{1}
HFC EDO _{A}	3–3	Kozakken Boys_{A}
EHC Hoensbroek _{A}	2–7	NAC _{1}
FC Eindhoven _{1}	0–1	RBC _{1}
Excelsior _{E}	1–3	FC Den Haag _{1}
FC Groningen _{E}	5–1	FC Den Bosch _{E}
FC Utrecht _{E}	3–1	Helmond Sport _{1}
Feyenoord _{E}	4–0	MVV _{E}
Fortuna Sittard _{E}	3–0	FC Wageningen _{1}
Go Ahead Eagles _{E}	1–1	SC Veendam _{1}
GVVV _{A}	3–1	HSV Hoek_{A}
SV Marken _{A}	3–1	VV Rheden _{A}
VV Oostkapelle _{A}	3–2	BSV Limburgia _{A}
VV Papendrecht _{A}	2–1	DWV Amsterdam _{A}
RCH Heemstede _{A}	3–2	Willem II _{1}
ROHDA Raalte _{A}	4–1	Spijkenisse _{A}
Rood Wit St.Willebrord _{A}	0–2	SC Heracles _{E}
SC Cambuur _{1}	1–2	DS '79 _{1}
Sportclub Enschede _{A}	1–1	sc Heerenveen _{1}
SVV _{1}	3–2	Roda JC _{E}
Telstar _{1}	1–0	RKC _{1}
SV Urk _{A}	1–4	AZ'67 _{E}
Vitesse Arnhem _{1}	0–3	PSV _{E}
RKVV Voerendaal _{A}	0–0	De Graafschap _{1}
VVV _{E}	0–5	PEC Zwolle _{1}
Wilhelmina'08_{A}	0–1	SV Spakenburg _{A}

_{E} Eredivisie; _{1} Eerste Divisie; _{A} Amateur teams

=== Replays ===
October 30 and November 2, 1985
De Graafschap	4–1	RKVV Voerendaal
Kozakken Boys	(p) 0-0	HFC EDO
sc Heerenveen	2–1	Sportclub Enschede
SC Veendam	(p) 0-0	Go Ahead Eagles

== Second round ==
November 23 and 24, 1985; March 11 and February 9, 1986
AZ'67	0–0	FC Groningen
FC Twente	2–3	NEC
FC Utrecht	0–4	Ajax
Feyenoord	4–1	PSV
Fortuna Sittard	3–0	ASWH Hendrik I.Ambacht
Kozakken Boys Werkendam	0–2	PEC Zwolle
SV Marken	3–1	SC Heracles
NAC Breda	2–0	SVV
VV Oostkapelle	2–2	Telstar
RBC	3–2	DS '79
ROHDA Raalte	1–0	GVVV Veenendaal
sc Heerenveen	1–1	RCH Heemstede
SC Veendam	1–1	De Graafschap
SV Spakenburg	1–1	FC Den Haag
FC Volendam	0–2	VV Papendrecht
VVOG Harderwijk	2–2	HFC Haarlem

=== Replays ===
December 18, 1985; January 18, February 8 and 9, 1986
FC Den Haag	2–0	SV Spakenburg
FC Groningen	2–0 (aet)	AZ'67
De Graafschap	2–1	SC Veendam
HFC Haarlem	4–1	VVOG Harderwijk
RCH Heemstede	2–1 (aet)	sc Heerenveen
Telstar	2–0	VV Oostkapelle

== Third round ==
March 8, 18 and 19, 1986
FC Den Haag	4–2	NAC Breda
FC Groningen	3–0	VV Papendrecht
Fortuna Sittard	2–1	Feyenoord
HFC Haarlem	0–0	PEC Zwolle
NEC	1–0	De Graafschap
RBC	1–1	Telstar
RCH Heemstede	1–3	Ajax
ROHDA Raalte	1–3	SV Marken

=== Replays ===
April 9, 1986
PEC Zwolle	0–1	HFC Haarlem
Telstar	0–0 (p)	RBC

== From quarterfinals to final ==
Quarter-finals
22 March
NEC	2
Fortuna Sittard	1
23 March
Ajax	1
FC Groningen	0
22 March
HFC Haarlem	0
RBC	1
23 March
SV Marken	0
FC Den Haag	1

Semi-finals
7 May
NEC	1
Ajax	3
8 May
RBC	2
FC Den Haag	1

Final
28 May
Ajax	3
RBC	0

== Final ==
=== Match details ===
28 May 1986

Ajax	3–0	RBC
Bosman 46', 80'; Silooy 67'	Report

De Meer, Amsterdam
Attendance: 25,000
Referee: John Blankenstein

GK	(Netherlands) Stanley Menzo
RB	(Netherlands) Sonny Silooy
CB	(Netherlands) Ronald Koeman
CB	(Netherlands) Ronald Spelbos
LB	(Netherlands) Peter Boeve
RM	(Netherlands) Gerald Vanenburg	(substituted off) 46'
CM	(Netherlands) Frank Rijkaard
LM	(Netherlands) Arnold Mühren
RM	(Netherlands) John van 't Schip
CF	(Netherlands) Marco van Basten (c)
LF	(Netherlands) Rob de Wit
Substitutes:
FW	(Netherlands) John Bosman	(substituted on) 46'
Manager:
(Netherlands) Johan Cruijff

GK	(Netherlands) Frank Brugel (c)
RB	(Netherlands) Peter Pijpers
CB	(Netherlands) Ruud Brood
CB	(Netherlands) Mario Molenaar
LB	(Netherlands) Tommie Kerstens
RM	(Netherlands) Albert Jurgens
CM	(Netherlands) Wim van der Steene	(substituted off) 51'
LM	(Netherlands) Gerry Jumelet
RF	(Netherlands) Clemens Bastiaansen
CF	(Netherlands) Gerrie Voets
LF	(Netherlands) Dirk van der Laan
Substitutes:
FW	(Netherlands) Arie Romijn	(substituted on) 51'
Manager:
(Netherlands) Hans Verèl

Match rules

- 90 minutes.
- 30 minutes of extra-time if necessary.
- Penalty shoot-out if scores still level.
- Maximum of two substitutions.

Ajax would play in the Cup Winners' Cup.
