= Nol de Ruiter =

Dutch footballer and coach (1940–2025)

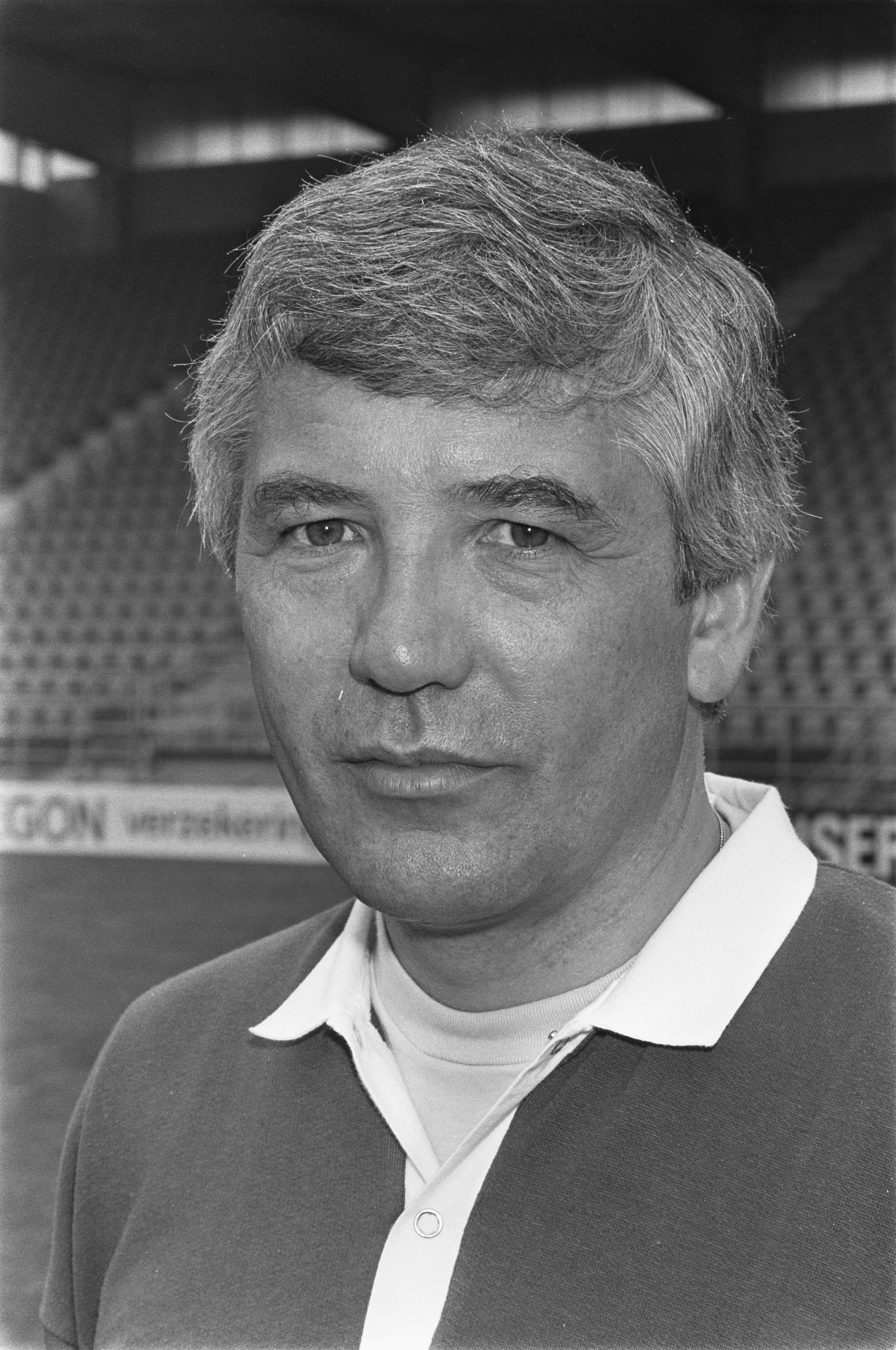
- De Ruiter in 1984

Personal information
- Date of birth: 6 April 1940
- Place of birth: Utrecht, Netherlands
- Date of death: 21 May 2025 (aged 85)
- Place of death: Houten, Netherlands
- Position: Defender

Senior career*
| Years | Team | Apps | (Gls) |
| 1960–1963 | DOS | 36 | (1) |
| 1963–1964 | USV Elinkwijk | | (0) |
| 1964–1965 | Velox | | (0) |
| Total | | | (1) |

Managerial career
- 1974–1976: FC Den Bosch
- 1976–1980: SC Cambuur
- 1980–1982: FC Wageningen
- 1982–1983: SVV
- 1983–1984: BV Veendam
- 1984–1987: FC Utrecht
- 1990: Netherlands
- 1992–1994: ADO Den Haag
- 1994–1995: Egypt
- 1995–1996: FC Utrecht
- 1997: FC Utrecht
- * Club domestic league appearances and goals

Nol de Ruiter (6 April 1940 – 21 May 2025) was a Dutch football coach and player, who played as a defender.

== Playing career ==
Born in Utrecht, De Ruiter played football for local sides DOS, Velox and USV Elinkwijk. The three clubs merged in 1970 to form the professional FC Utrecht. He played as a defender.

== Coaching career ==
After retiring as a player, De Ruiter began his coaching career as an assistant to Jan Remmers at N.E.C.. He later succeeded Remmers at the helm at FC Den Bosch and managed a number of other Dutch club sides including Cambuur, FC Wageningen, Veendam, FC Utrecht and ADO Den Haag. As manager he led Utrecht to victory in the 1984–85 KNVB Cup. De Ruiter also managed the national sides of the Netherlands and Egypt. He was assistant to manager Rinus Michels when the Oranje won their first and only major championship the UEFA Euro 1988 in West Germany.

== Personal life ==
De Ruiter was married to Nel and his son-in-law Foeke Booy is a football manager and former player who married his daughter Wendy.

=== Death ===
De Ruiter died on 21 May 2025, at the age of 85.
