= Hans Verèl =

Dutch footballer (1953–2019)

Personal information
- Date of birth: 21 April 1953
- Place of birth: Rotterdam, Netherlands
- Date of death: 9 November 2019 (aged 66)
- Place of death: Tilburg, Netherlands
- Position: Defender

Youth career
- Sparta

Senior career*
Years	Team	Apps	(Gls)
1972–1976	Sparta	1	(0)
1976–1977	SVV		
1977–1978	Den Bosch	5	(0)

Managerial career
- 1978–1980: Den Bosch (Assistant)
- 1980–1984: Den Bosch
- 1984–1987: RBC
- 1987–1990: NAC
- 1990–1991: Dordrecht'90
- 1991–1992: SVV/Dordrecht'90
- 1993: RKC
- 1995–1996: Pakhtakor Tashkent
- 1996–2001: Willem II (Assistant)
- 2000: Willem II (Caretaker)
- 2001: Fortuna Sittard
- * Club domestic league appearances and goals

Hans Verèl (21 April 1953 – 9 November 2019) was a football defender and midfielder from the Netherlands, who played for Sparta Rotterdam, SVV and FC Den Bosch.

== Playing career ==
Verèl made his debut for Sparta on 20 May 1973 against Den Bosch, but only managed to play one league game for the club. In 1976 he left for SVV.

== Managerial career ==
A persistent injury ended his career while playing for Den Bosch in 1978, and he became an assistant coach at the club. In 1982 he became head coach alongside general manager Ad Zonderland and they won promotion with Den Bosch to the Eredivisie in 1983. He later coached RBC Roosendaal, with whom he reached the 1985–86 KNVB Cup Final, NAC Breda, (SVV/)Dordrecht'90, RKC Waalwijk, FC Pakhtakor Tashkent (Uzbekistan), Willem II Tilburg and Fortuna Sittard. He also worked as an assistant to Jimmy Calderwood, Co Adriaanse and Hans Westerhof at Willem II and experienced the club's biggest success in qualification for the 1999–2000 UEFA Champions League.

== Personal life ==
Verèl retired as a coach after his dismissal in Sittard and was director at a swimming centre in Roosendaal until 2015. He died in November 2019 after a long illness.
