= Wiljan Vloet =

Dutch football manager (born 1962)

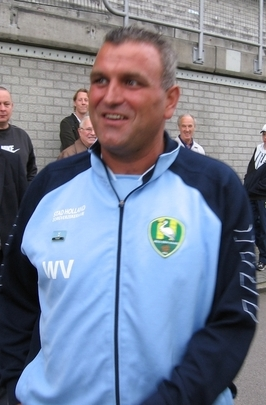
- Vloet with ADO Den Haag in 2007

Personal information
- Date of birth: 10 September 1962 (age 64)
- Place of birth: Schijndel, Netherlands
- Position: Midfielder

Youth career
- RKSV Schijndel

Senior career*
Years	Team	Apps	(Gls)
–1979	RKSV Schijndel	182	(69)
1979–1982	VV Heerenveen	94	(12)
1982–1983	RKSV Schijndel	33	(12)
1983–1984	Dijka Steenwijk	24	(4)

Managerial career
- 1984–1985: SV Heusden
- 1985–1987: Dijka Steenwijk
- 1987–1989: Cuijk
- 1989–1993: Sparta '25
- 1993–1999: OJC Rosmalen
- 2001–2002: Den Bosch
- 2002–2005: Roda JC
- 2005–2007: Sparta Rotterdam
- 2007–2008: ADO Den Haag
- 2009–2011: NEC
- 2014: Niki Volos
- 2016–2017: Den Bosch
- * Club domestic league appearances and goals

Wiljan Vloet (born 10 September 1962) is a Dutch football manager, executive and former player. He serves as the sporting director of FC Den Bosch.

== Playing career ==
As a footballer, Vloet never played for a professional club. He started his career at hometown club RKSV Schijndel from Brabant, with whom he reached the Eerste Klasse. In 1979, he moved to Friesland at the age of 16, where he went to study at the CIOS, a vocational education centered around physical education. He went to play for VV Heerenveen in Friesland after being considered unfit for the professional branch of the club, SC Heerenveen, after a trial. Vloet played with VV Heerenveen in the Derde Klasse of amateur football. Vloet would, however, begin coaching at SC Heerenveen, where he took care of one of the under-15 team. In 1982, he returned to Brabant and started playing for RKSV Schijndel again. After a year, however, he decided to return to Friesland to coach at VV Akkrum, located close to Heerenveen, and to play at Dijka Steenwijk, where coaching legend Foppe de Haan became his head coach.

== Managerial career ==
Vloet started working as coach in 1979, when he took charge of the youth team of amateurs VV Heerenveen while still playing there. In 1984, he took his first head coaching job, at amateurs SV Heusden. In 1999, after six seasons in charge of Hoofdklasse club OJC Rosmalen, he was appointed by Den Bosch as youth coach; in 2001 he received head coaching duties at the same club, being however unable to save it from relegation to the Eerste Divisie. He successively moved to Roda JC, where he stayed in charge from 2002 to 2005. He then moved to Sparta Rotterdam and was replaced at the end of the 2006–07 season by Gert Aandewiel, who came over from HFC Haarlem. Vloet then signed with ADO Den Haag, who he guided back to the Eredivisie in the spring of 2008. He then worked as youth coach of PSV until November 2009, when he was appointed head coach of Eredivisie club NEC. After two seasons in charge of the Nijmegen club, he left in June 2011 to accept a move back at Sparta Rotterdam, this time as technical director for the club.

Vloet signed a three-year deal with Greek club Niki Volos in June 2014, who had just been promoted to the Super League at the time. After losing the first three consecutive league matches to Olympiacos, Atromitos and PAOK, the club dismissed him three months after his arrival.

On 10 February 2016, Den Bosch announced Vloet would succeed René van Eck as manager of the club, thereby starting his second term at the club. In March 2017, he was promoted to the position of director of football within the club. In that role he became responsible for the entire youth academy and the club's scouting apparatus. He signed a contract for an indefinite period. He was succeeded at the head coach position by Wil Boessen.

== Electoral history ==
Electoral history of Wiljan Vloet
Year	Body	Party	Pos.	Votes	Result		Ref.
Year	Body	Party	Pos.	Votes	Party seats	Individual	Ref.
2021	House of Representatives	Christian Democratic Appeal	71/76 (Note: Participated as lijstduwer in the electoral district Rotterdam and Dordrecht.)	17	15	Lost	
