= Kees Zwamborn =

Dutch footballer (born 1952)

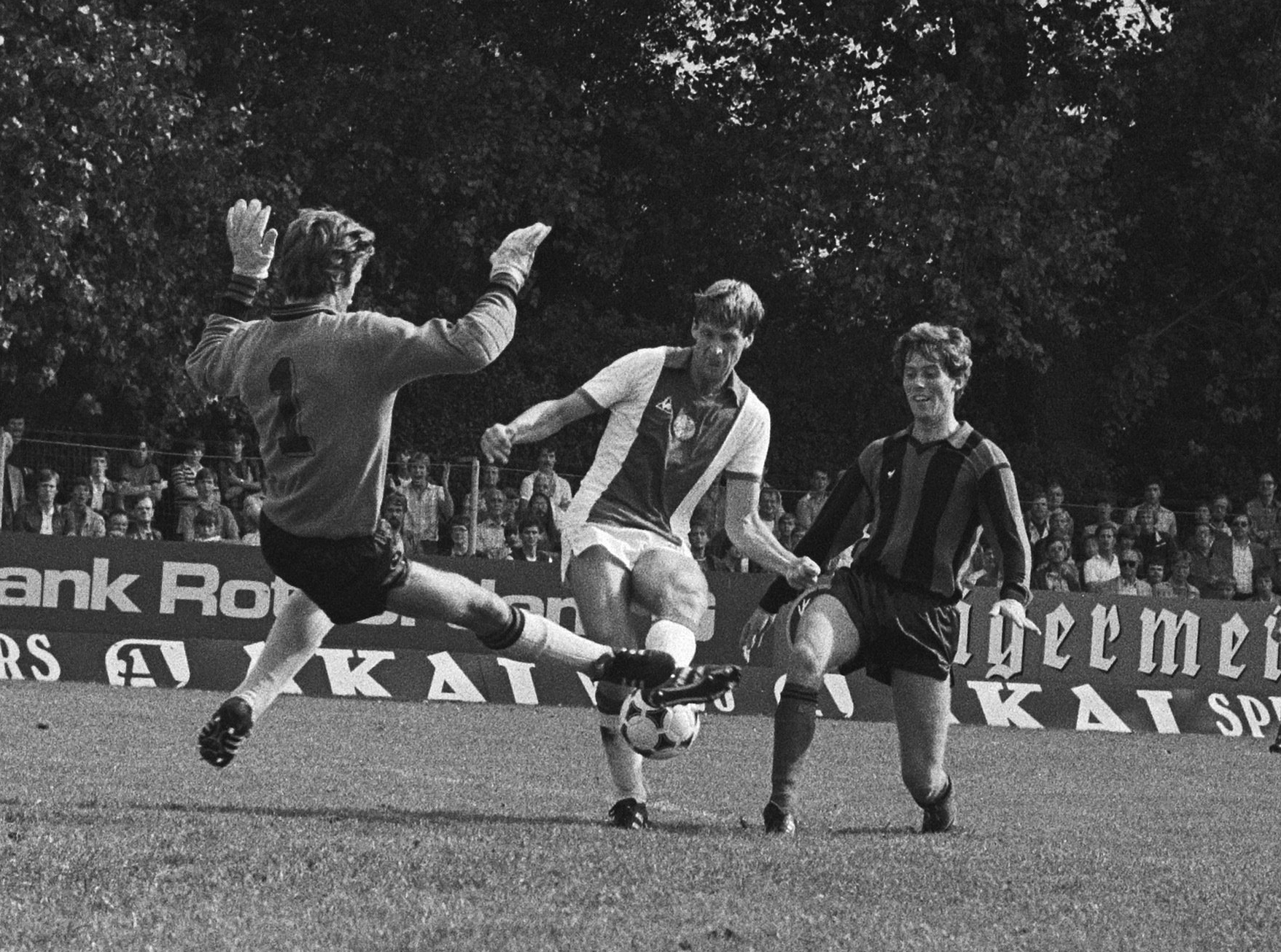
- Zwamborn (centre) in 1980

Personal information
- Date of birth: 28 March 1952 (age 74)
- Place of birth: Alblasserdam, Netherlands
- Position: Midfielder

Senior career*
Years	Team	Apps	(Gls)
1975–1978	FC Vlaardingen '74		
1978–1981	Ajax	73	(3)
1981–1983	MSV Duisburg	48	(1)
1983–1985	NAC Breda		

Managerial career
- 1996–1998: Den Bosch
- 1999–2000: NAC Breda
- 2005–2006: Willem II Tilburg
- 2010: Suriname
- * Club domestic league appearances and goals

Kees Zwamborn (born 28 March 1952) is a Dutch former professional footballer who played as a defender.

Zwamborn was born in Alblasserdam, South Holland. From 1978 to 1985, he played both in the Eredivisie and Eerste divisie as well as in the Bundesliga and NAC Breda. After his playing career he was employed in managing roles by Feyenoord Rotterdam, FC Den Bosch, NAC Breda, Willem II Tilburg, an academy director at Sunderland A.F.C. between 2003 and 2004 and Ajax. In 2010, he became the manager of the Suriname national team.
