= FC Den Bosch =

Association football club in the Netherlands

- Full name: Football Club Den Bosch
- Nickname: De Blauwwitte Draken (The Blue White Dragons)
- Founded: 18 August 1965; 61 years ago
- Ground: de Vliert, 's-Hertogenbosch
- Capacity: 6,936
- Owner(s): Eric Li Ying, Eddie Tao and two 'angel investors (Bridge Football Group), together (53%); BV Forza FC Den Bosch (47%); Stichting Behoud Betaald Voetbal ’s-Hertogenbosch (Golden Share)
- Chairman: Jesper Gudde (technical manager)
- Head coach: Bart Schreuder
- League: Eerste Divisie
- 2025–26: Eerste Divisie, 9th of 20
- Website: www.fcdenbosch.nl
| Home colours | Away colours | Third colours |

FC Den Bosch (Dutch pronunciation: [ɛfˈseː dɛmˈbɔs]) is a professional football club from 's-Hertogenbosch, the Netherlands. They currently compete in the Eerste Divisie.

They were founded 18 August 1965, as FC Den Bosch/BVV. They are the successor of BVV (1906) and Wilhelmina (1890). Their stadium is called 'De Vliert', an 6,500 all-seater. Ruud van Nistelrooy started his professional career at this club. In 2005 they finished bottom of the Eredivisie and were relegated to the Eerste Divisie.

== History ==
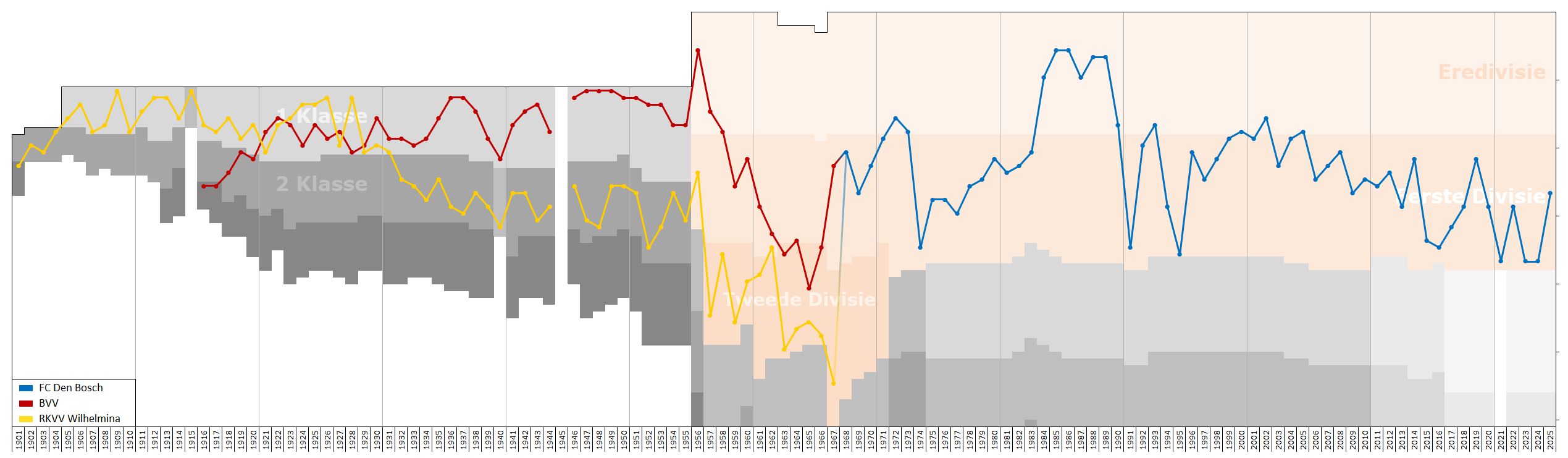
Historical chart of league performance

The club were founded on 18 August 1965 as the successor to BVV, who were formed in 1906 and Dutch champions in 1948. They were champions of the 1965–66 Tweede Divisie B., They merged with Wilhelmina (1890) on 10 May 1967 to form F.C. Den Bosch '67, before being crowned champions of 1970–71 Eerste Divisie to secure promotion to the Eredivise for the first time in their history. Their first season in the Eredivisie, the 1971–72 season saw Den Bosch struggle with relegation all season, but they would eventually finish 16th, three points above the relegation zone, following a late-season upturn in form. Despite this the club lasted just two seasons in the Eredivise as they finished bottom of the 1972–73 Eredivisie and were relegated to the Eerste Divisie.

Den Bosch struggled following their return to the Eerste Divisie, failing to finish in the top half until the 1977–78 season. However, come the turn of the decade, Den Bosch were consistently challenging for promotion, with the club competing in the promotion play-off for the 1980–81 season, only to lose out to De Graafschap. However, they would win the promotion play-offs for the 1982–83 season, marking their return to the Eredivisie. The club's first season return in the Eredivisie saw them finish 10th in the Eredivisie, before the next two seasons saw 6th-place finishes for the club, with the latter seeing Den Bosch finish just 3 points off the UEFA Cup qualification places. This success did not last though as they were relegated to the Eerste Divisie in the 1989–90 season, shortly after the club was renamed B.V.V. Den Bosch in 1988.

The club saw promotions to the Eredivisie in the 1991–92, 1998–99, 2000–01 and the 2003–04 seasons (the latter three as champions), only to be relegated to the Eerste Divisie each time. The club also returned its name to FC Den Bosch in 1992. In the ten years following their relegation to the Eerste Divisie, they competed in the promotion play-offs on six occasions bit failed to get promoted on any of them.

In the summer of 2018, after years of financial problems and bad performances in Eerste Divisie a Georgian businessman Kakhi Jordania, decided to invest in the club with intent to purchase. His ownership group was allowed to start making changes in the management, while they were awaiting the approval of KNVB. The club had a best season in years. The team finished as winter champions in Eerste Divisie, but could not continue their good form after the winter break. Den Bosch still managed to qualify for the promotion playoffs, where they lost to Go Ahead Eagles. After a year of due diligence, KNVB decided not to grant the new ownership group the right to purchase the club.

In November 2019, Den Bosch supporters racially abused SBV Excelsior player Ahmad Mendes Moreira in a match against the club, with Moreira having allegedly been called a 'negro and cotton-picker' prior to the match being halted after 30 minutes. Following the match, Moreira was labelled as a "pathetic little man" by Den Bosch's manager and the club originally stated that Moreira mistook 'crow sounds' for racist abuse, before later apologising for that statement. A few days after the match Den Bosch's manager apologised to Moreira. The "pathetic little man" label was about the way Moreira celebrated his goal and had nothing to do with racism. Moreira accepted these words. Following the incident and criticism from Netherlands internationals Memphis Depay and Georginio Wijnaldum, it was announced that players in the Dutch top two divisions would not play during the first minute of the following weekend's games in protest against racism in Dutch football as a result of the incident. In response to the incident, Den Bosch banned a number of supporters from attending games in January 2020. It was the first time a professional match in the Netherlands had to be halted as a result of racism.

In September 2021, a group of American investors including Paul Conway of Pacific Media Group, Randy Frankel of Partners Path Capital, Chien Lee of NewCity Capital and Krishen Sud acquired 53% of FC Den Bosch.

On April 10, 2024, the club announced that American investors had sold 53% of FC Den Bosch to Eric Li Ying, Eddie Tao, and two other investors. The club also expressed its gratitude to Chien Lee, acknowledging his exceptional commitment and significant contributions in supporting and funding the club through a challenging financial period and helping to establish a new ownership structure.

=== Club names ===
- FC Den Bosch/BVV (1965–1967)
- FC Den Bosch '67 (1967–1988)
- BVV Den Bosch (1988–1992)
- FC Den Bosch (1992–present)

== Players ==
=== Current squad ===
As of 9 October 2026

Note: Flags indicate national team as defined under FIFA eligibility rules; some limited exceptions apply. Players may hold more than one non-FIFA nationality.

| No. | Pos. | Nation | Player |
|---|---|---|---|
| 1 | GK | NED | Pepijn van de Merbel |
| 2 | DF | SDN | Sheddy Barglan |
| 3 | DF | NED | Stan Maas |
| 4 | DF | NED | Jasper van Heertum |
| 7 | FW | NED | Genrich Sillé |
| 8 | FW | CGO | Kévin Monzialo |
| 9 | FW | SWE | Sebastian Karlsson Grach |
| 10 | MF | USA | Devon De Corte |
| 11 | FW | USA | Jack de Vries |
| 15 | DF | NED | Reda Akmum |
| 16 | MF | CHN | Bohao Wang (on loan from Shaanxi Union) |
| 17 | FW | CUW | Emian-Johar Semedo |

| No. | Pos. | Nation | Player |
|---|---|---|---|
| 18 | MF | NED | Hessel Eikelboom |
| 19 | FW | NED | Rafi Wolters |
| 21 | GK | NED | Finn Murre |
| 22 | DF | CPV | Jeffry Fortes (captain) |
| 25 | DF | NED | Silvan Bröker |
| 27 | FW | NED | Lorenzo Hoffman |
| 31 | GK | NED | Tjemme Bijlsma |
| 33 | DF | NED | Mees Laros |
| 35 | MF | NED | Boris van Schuppen |
| 40 | MF | MAR | Ilias Boumassaoudi |
| 41 | DF | NED | Kai de Rooij |

== Former players ==
=== National team players ===
The following players received caps national teams in international football during their tenure with FC Den Bosch:

- Afghanistan
  - (Afghanistan) Najim Haidary (2019–2022)
  Barbados
  - (Barbados) Ryan Trotman (2021)
  Canada
  - (Canada) Frank Sturing (2021)
  Curaçao
  - (Curaçao) Jurich Carolina (2019)
  - (Curaçao) Kevin Felida (2021–2022; 2025–2026)
  - (Curaçao) Shuremy Felomina (2012)
- Estonia
  - (Estonia) Rauno Sappinen (2018–2019)
  - (Estonia) Markus Soomets (2025)
  Finland
  - (Finland) Niki Mäenpää (2008–2009)
  - (Finland) Leo Väisänen (2018–2020)
  Iraq
  - (Iraq) Osama Rashid (2011)
  Liberia
  - (Liberia) Christopher Wreh (2000)
- Lithuania
  - (Lithuania) Vykintas Slivka (2015–2016)
  Netherlands
  - (Netherlands) Hendrie Krüzen (1987–1988)
  Sint Maarten
  - (Sint Maarten) T-Shawn Illidge (2023–2025)
  Somalia
  - (Somalia) Abdulsamed Abdullahi (2019)
  Sudan
  - (Sudan) Sheddy Barglan (2023–present)

Years in brackets indicate careerspan with caps at FC Den Bosch.

=== National team players by Confederation ===
Member associations are listed in order of most to least amount of current and former FC Den Bosch players represented Internationally

Total national team players by confederation
| Confederation | Total | (Nation) Association |
|---|---|---|
| AFC | 2 | Afghanistan (1), Iraq (1) |
| CAF | 3 | Liberia (1), Somalia (1), Sudan (1) |
| CONCACAF | 6 | Curaçao (3), Barbados (1), Canada (1), Sint Maarten (1) |
| CONMEBOL | 0 | |
| OFC | 0 | |
| UEFA | 5 | Estonia (2), Finland (2), Lithuania (1), Netherlands (1) |

== Players in international tournaments ==
The following is a list of FC Den Bosch players who have competed in international tournaments, including the FIFA World Cup, UEFA European Championship, CONCACAF Gold Cup and the Africa Cup of Nations. To this date no FC Den Bosch players have participated in the AFC Asian Cup, Copa América, or the OFC Nations Cup while playing for FC Den Bosch.

| Cup | Players |
|---|---|
| (Germany) UEFA Euro 1988 | (Netherlands) Hendrie Krüzen |
| (United States) 2021 CONCACAF Gold Cup | (Canada) Frank Sturing |
| (Morocco) 2025 Africa Cup of Nations | (Sudan) Sheddy Barglan |
| (Canada) (Mexico) (United States) 2026 FIFA World Cup | (Curaçao) Kevin Felida |

== Honours ==
- Eredivisie/Dutch Champions
  - Winners: 1947–48 (as BVV)
- Eerste Divisie
  - Winners: 1970–71, 1998–99, 2000–01, 2003–04
  - Promoted: 1982–83, 1991–92
- Tweede Divisie
  - Winners: 1965–66
  - Promoted: 1962–63
- KNVB Cup
  - Runners-up: 1990–91

Below is a table with FC Den Bosch's domestic results since the introduction of professional football in 1956.

Domestic Results since 1956
| Domestic league | League result | Qualification to | KNVB Cup season | Cup result |
|---|---|---|---|---|
| 2025–26 Eerste Divisie | 9th | promotion/relegation play-offs: no promotion | 2025–26 | round of 16 |
| 2024–25 Eerste Divisie | 9th | promotion/relegation play-offs: no promotion | 2024–25 | first round |
| 2023–24 Eerste Divisie | 19th | – | 2023–24 | first round |
| 2022–23 Eerste Divisie | 19th | – | 2022–23 | second round |
| 2021–22 Eerste Divisie | 11th | – | 2021–22 | first round |
| 2020–21 Eerste Divisie | 19th | – | 2020–21 | first round |
| 2019–20 Eerste Divisie | 11th | – | 2019–20 | first round |
| 2018–19 Eerste Divisie | 4th | promotion/relegation play-offs: no promotion | 2018–19 | first round |
| 2017–18 Eerste Divisie | 11th | – | 2017–18 | second round |
| 2016–17 Eerste Divisie | 14th | – | 2016–17 | first round |
| 2015–16 Eerste Divisie | 17th | – | 2015–16 | quarter-finals |
| 2014–15 Eerste Divisie | 16th | – | 2014–15 | second round |
| 2013–14 Eerste Divisie | 4th | promotion/relegation play-offs: no promotion | 2013–14 | second round |
| 2012–13 Eerste Divisie | 11th | – | 2012–13 | quarter-final |
| 2011–12 Eerste Divisie | 6th | promotion/relegation play-offs: no promotion | 2011–12 | third round |
| 2010–11 Eerste Divisie | 8th | promotion/relegation play-offs: no promotion | 2010–11 | third round |
| 2009–10 Eerste Divisie | 7th | promotion/relegation play-offs: no promotion | 2009–10 | third round |
| 2008–09 Eerste Divisie | 9th | – | 2008–09 | third round |
| 2007–08 Eerste Divisie | 3rd | promotion/relegation play-offs: no promotion | 2007–08 | round of 16 |
| 2006–07 Eerste Divisie | 5th | promotion/relegation play-offs: no promotion | 2006–07 | third round |
| 2005–06 Eerste Divisie | 7th | – | 2005–06 | first round |
| 2004–05 Eredivisie | 18th | Eerste Divisie (relegation) | 2004–05 | quarter-final |
| 2003–04 Eerste Divisie | 1st | Eredivisie (promotion) | 2003–04 | third round |
| 2002–03 Eerste Divisie | 5th | promotion/relegation play-offs: no promotion | 2002–03 | group stage |
| 2001–02 Eredivisie | 16th | Eerste Divisie (losing prom./releg. play-offs) | 2001–02 | round of 16 |
| 2000–01 Eerste Divisie | 1st | Eredivisie (promotion) | 2000–01 | round of 16 |
| 1999–2000 Eredivisie | 18th | Eerste Divisie (relegation) | 1999–2000 | second round |
| 1998–99 Eerste Divisie | 1st | Eredivisie (promotion) | 1998–99 | second round |
| 1997–98 Eerste Divisie | 4th | – | 1997–98 | round of 16 |
| 1996–97 Eerste Divisie | 7th | – | 1996–97 | group stage |
| 1995–96 Eerste Divisie | 3rd | promotion/relegation play-offs: no promotion | 1995–96 | second round |
| 1994–95 Eerste Divisie | 18th | – | 1994–95 | second round |
| 1993–94 Eerste Divisie | 11th | – | 1993–94 | round of 16 |
| 1992–93 Eredivisie | 17th | Eerste Divisie (losing prom./releg. play-offs) | 1992–93 | semi-final |
| 1991–92 Eerste Divisie | 2nd | Eredivisie (winning prom./releg. play-offs) | 1991–92 | third round |
| 1990–91 Eerste Divisie | 17th | – | 1990–91 | final |
| 1989–90 Eredivisie | 17th | Eerste Divisie (relegation) | 1989–90 | round of 16 |
| 1988–89 Eredivisie | 7th | – | 1988–89 | second round |
| 1987–88 Eredivisie | 7th | – | 1987–88 | round of 16 |
| 1986–87 Eredivisie | 10th | – | 1986–87 | quarter-final |
| 1985–86 Eredivisie | 6th | – | 1985–86 | first round |
| 1984–85 Eredivisie | 6th | – | 1984–85 | quarter-final |
| 1983–84 Eredivisie | 10th | – | 1983–84 | first round |
| 1982–83 Eerste Divisie | 3rd | Eredivisie (winning promotion competition) | 1982–83 | first round |
| 1981–82 Eerste Divisie | 5th | – | 1981–82 | round of 16 |
| 1980–81 Eerste Divisie | 6th | promotion competition: no promotion | 1980–81 | second round |
| 1979–80 Eerste Divisie | 4th | – | 1979–80 | second round |
| 1978–79 Eerste Divisie | 7th | – | 1978–79 | round of 16 |
| 1977–78 Eerste Divisie | 8th | – | 1977–78 | first round |
| 1976–77 Eerste Divisie | 12th | – | 1976–77 | second round |
| 1975–76 Eerste Divisie | 10th | – | 1975–76 | second round |
| 1974–75 Eerste Divisie | 10th | – | 1974–75 | first round |
| 1973–74 Eerste Divisie | 17th | – | 1973–74 | quarter-final |
| 1972–73 Eredivisie | 18th | Eerste Divisie (relegation) | 1972–73 | second round |
| 1971–72 Eredivisie | 16th | – | 1971–72 | first round |
| 1970–71 Eerste Divisie | 1st | Eredivisie (promotion) | 1970–71 | first round |
| 1969–70 Eerste Divisie | 5th | – | 1969–70 | second round |
| 1968–69 Eerste Divisie | 9th | – | 1968–69 | first round |
| 1967–68 Eerste Divisie | 3rd | – | 1967–68 | group stage |
| 1966–67 Eerste Divisie; 1966–67 Tweede Divisie (as Wilhelmina) | 5th 17th | – merged into existing FC Den Bosch | 1966–67 | round of 16 did not participate |
| 1965–66 Tweede Divisie (and as Wilhelmina) | 1st (group B); 14th (group B) | Eerste Divisie (promotion) – | 1965–66 | round of 16 group stage |
| 1964–65 Tweede Divisie (as BVV and Wilhelmina) | 7th (group B); 12th (group B) | – | 1964–65 | first round |
| 1963–64 Eerste Divisie (as BVV); 1963–64 Tweede Divisie (as Wilhelmina) | 16th 13th (group B) | Tweede Divisie (relegation) – | 1963–64 | first round quarter-final |
| 1962–63 Tweede Divisie (as BVV and Wilhelmina) | 2nd (group B); 15th (group B) | Eerste Divisie (winning promotion play-off) – | 1962–63 | first round |
| 1961–62 Eerste Divisie (as BVV and Wilhelmina) | 15th (group A); 17th (group B) | Tweede Divisie (relegation) | 1961–62 | ? |
| 1960–61 Eerste Divisie (as BVV); 1960–61 Tweede Divisie (as Wilhelmina) | 11th (group A); 3rd (group A) | – Eerste Divisie (winning promotion play-off) | 1960–61 | ? |
| 1959–60 Eerste Divisie (as BVV); 1959–60 Tweede Divisie (as Wilhelmina) | 4th (group A); 6th (group A) | – | not held | not held |
| 1958–59 Eerste Divisie (as BVV); 1958–59 Tweede Divisie (as Wilhelmina) | 8th (group A); 12th (group A) | – | 1958–59 | ? |
| 1957–58 Eredivisie (as BVV); 1957–58 Tweede Divisie (as Wilhelmina) | 18th 2nd (group A) | Eerste Divisie (relegation) – | 1957–58 | ? |
| 1956–57 Eredivisie (as BVV); 1956–57 Tweede Divisie (as Wilhelmina) | 15th 11th (group B) | – | 1956–57 | ? |

== Club staff ==
| Position | Name |
|---|---|
| Head coach | Bart Schreuder |
| Assistant coach | William van Overbeek; Fouzi Mesaoudi |
| Goalkeeping coach | Colin van der Meijden |
| Teammanager | Pieter Tuns |
| Video analyst | Jop Zweekhorst |
| Technical manager | Jesper Gudde |

== Managerial history ==
- (Netherlands) Ben Tap (1965–70)
- (Netherlands) Jan Remmers (1970–74)
- (Netherlands) Nol de Ruiter (1974–76)
- (Netherlands) Ad Zonderland (1976–78)
- (Netherlands) Rinus Gosens (1979–80)
- (Netherlands) Ad Zonderland (1980)
- (Netherlands) Hans Verèl (1981–84)
- (Netherlands) Rinus Israel (1984–86)
- (Netherlands) Theo de Jong (1986–89)
- (Netherlands) Rinus Israel (1989–90)
- (Netherlands) Hans van der Pluijm (1990–95)
- (Netherlands) Chris Dekker (1995–96)
- (Netherlands) Kees Zwamborn (1996–98)
- (Netherlands) Martin Koopman (1998–00)
- (Netherlands) Mark Wotte (2000)
- (Netherlands) André Wetzel and Jan van Grinsven (2000) (a.i.)
- (Netherlands) Jan Poortvliet (2000–01)
- (Netherlands) Wiljan Vloet (2001–02)
- (Netherlands) Gert Kruys (2002–04)
- (Netherlands) Henk Wisman (2004–05)
- (Netherlands) J. van Grinsven, F. van der Hoorn and W. van der Horst (2005) (a.i.)
- (Netherlands) Theo Bos (2005–09)
- (Netherlands) J. van Grinsven, F. van der Hoorn and W. van der Horst (2009) (a.i.)
- (Belgium) Marc Brys (2009–10)
- (Netherlands) Alfons Groenendijk (2010–12)
- (Netherlands) Jan Poortvliet (2012–13)
- (Netherlands) Ruud Kaiser (2013–15)
- (Netherlands) René van Eck (2015–16)
- (Netherlands) Wiljan Vloet (2016–17)
- (Netherlands) Wil Boessen (2017–19)
- (Netherlands) Erik van der Ven (2019–21)
- (Netherlands) William van Overbeek and Paul Verhaegh (2021) (a.i.)
- (Netherlands) Jack de Gier (2021–23)
- (Poland) Tomasz Kaczmarek (2023–2024)
- (Netherlands) William van Overbeek (2024) (a.i.)
- (Portugal) David Nascimento (2024)
- (Netherlands) Ulrich Landvreugd (2024) (a.i.)
- (Netherlands) Ulrich Landvreugd (2024–2026)
- (Netherlands) Bart Schreuder (2026–

== Statistics ==
| SEASON | CLUB TOP SCORER | GOALS | DIVISION | ATTENDANCE | RANK | MANAGER |
|---|---|---|---|---|---|---|
| 1965–66 | Frans Olde Riekerink | 17 | Tweede Divisie | 6.640 | 1 | Ben Tap |
| 1966–67 | Frans Olde Riekerink | 14 | Eerste Divisie | 6.895 | 5 | Ben Tap |
| 1967–68 | Ben Tinus | 17 | Eerste Divisie | 7.670 | 3 | Ben Tap |
| 1968–69 | Eef Mulders | 9 | Eerste Divisie | 5.350 | 9 | Ben Tap |
| 1969–70 | Eef Mulders | 10 | Eerste Divisie | 3.810 | 5 | Ben Tap |
| 1970–71 | Leo Ouwens | 11 | Eerste Divisie | 8.400 | 1 | Jan Remmers |
| 1971–72 | Ilja Mitić | 9 | Eredivisie | 11.870 | 16 | Jan Remmers |
| 1972–73 | Dick Beek | 5 | Eredivisie | 8.645 | 18 | Jan Remmers |
| 1973–74 | Dick Beek | 6 | Eerste Divisie | 2.895 | 17 | Jan Remmers |
| 1974–75 | Jos Peltzer | 10 | Eerste Divisie | 3.085 | 10 | Nol de Ruiter |
| 1975–76 | Jos Peltzer | 10 | Eerste Divisie | 2.210 | 10 | Nol de Ruiter |
| 1976–77 | Jan Peters | 18 | Eerste Divisie | 2.415 | 12 | Ad Zonderland |
| 1977–78 | Jan Peters | 19 | Eerste Divisie | 3.517 | 8 | Ad Zonderland |
| 1978–79 | Bert Nijdam | 9 | Eerste Divisie | 3.700 | 7 | Rinus Gosens |
| 1979–80 | Arie Romijn | 16 | Eerste Divisie | 4.700 | 4 | Rinus Gosens / Ad Zonderland ao |
| 1980–81 | Arie Romijn | 10 | Eerste Divisie | 2.355 | 6 | Ad Zonderland ao / Hans Verèl |
| 1981–82 | Arie Romijn | 16 | Eerste Divisie | 2.870 | 5 | Hans Verèl |
| 1982–83 | Wim van der Horst | 17 | Eerste Divisie | 2.788 | 3 | Hans Verèl |
| 1983–84 | Wim van der Horst | 14 | Eredivisie | 7.154 | 10 | Hans Verèl |
| 1984–85 | Peter van der Waart | 12 | Eredivisie | 5.406 | 6 | Rinus Israël |
| 1985–86 | Hans Gillhaus | 16 | Eredivisie | 6.367 | 6 | Rinus Israël |
| 1986–87 | Hans Gillhaus | 17 | Eredivisie | 5.309 | 10 | Theo de Jong |
| 1987–88 | Hendrie Krüzen | 12 | Eredivisie | 3.938 | 7 | Theo de Jong |
| 1988–89 | Mart van Duren | 15 | Eredivisie | 3.803 | 7 | Theo de Jong |
| 1989–90 | Peter Barendse | 7 | Eredivisie | 3.521 | 17 | Rinus Israël |
| 1990–91 | Jack de Gier | 23 | Eerste Divisie | 1.334 | 17 | Rinus Israël / Hans van der Pluym |
| 1991–92 | Geert Brusselers | 13 | Eerste Divisie | 2.007 | 2 | Hans van der Pluym |
| 1992–93 | Dirk Jan Derksen | 10 | Eerste Divisie | 3.231 | 19 | Hans van der Pluym |
| 1993–94 | Stefan Jansen | 14 | Eerste Divisie | 1.626 | 11 | Hans van der Pluym |
| 1994–95 | Orpheo Keizerweerd | 7 | Eerste Divisie | 1.198 | 18 | Hans van der Pluym |
| 1995–96 | Anthony Lurling | 19 | Eerste Divisie | 2.735 | 3 | Chris Dekker |
| 1996–97 | Ruud van Nistelrooy | 12 | Eerste Divisie | 2.034 | 7 | Kees Zwamborn |
| 1997–98 | Thijs Waterink | 14 | Eerste Divisie | 2.405 | 4 | Kees Zwamborn |
| 1998–99 | Harry van der Laan | 30 | Eerste Divisie | 3.245 | 1 | Kees Zwamborn / Martin Koopman |
| 1999–00 | Henk Vos | 11 | Eredivisie | 4.240 | 18 | Martin Koopman / Mark Wotte |
| 2000–01 | Bart Van Den Eede | 23 | Eerste Divisie | 3.330 | 1 | Mark Wotte / André Wetzel, Jan van Grinsven & Wiljan Vloet ao / Jan Poortvliet |
| 2001–02 | Bart Van Den Eede | 14 | Eredivisie | 5.190 | 16 | Wiljan Vloet |
| 2002–03 | Stefan Jansen | 20 | Eerste Divisie | 3.919 | 5 | Gert Kruys |
| 2003–04 | Stefan Jansen | 25 | Eerste Divisie | 3.701 | 1 | Gert Kruys |
| 2004–05 | Koen van de Laak | 6 | Eredivisie | 5.790 | 18 | Henk Wisman / Jan van Grinsven, Fred van der Hoorn & Wim van der Horst ao |
| 2005–06 | Berry Powel | 19 | Eerste Divisie | 3.388 | 7 | Theo Bos |
| 2006–07 | Frank Demouge | 12 | Eerste Divisie | 3.800 | 5 | Theo Bos |
| 2007–08 | Koen van der Biezen | 18 | Eerste Divisie | 4.000 | 3 | Theo Bos |
| 2008–09 | Adnan Barakat | 13 | Eerste Divisie | 3.900 | 9 | Theo Bos / Jan van Grinsven, Fred van der Hoorn & Arnold Scholten ao |
| 2009–10 | Fabio Caracciolo | 19 | Eerste Divisie | 4.000 | 7 | Marc Brys |
| 2010–11 | John Verhoek | 10 | Eerste Divisie | 4.150 | 8 | Alfons Groenendijk |
| 2011–12 | Tom van Weert | 15 | Eerste Divisie | 4.050 | 6 | Alfons Groenendijk |
| 2012–13 | Tom van Weert | 17 | Eerste Divisie | 3.950 | 11 | Jan Poortvliet |
| 2013–14 | Erik Quekel | 19 | Eerste Divisie | 3.750 | 4 | Ruud Kaiser |
| 2014–15 | Anthony Lurling / Barry Maguire / Alexander Mols | 6 | Eerste Divisie | 3.250 | 16 | Ruud Kaiser / René van Eck |
| 2015–16 | Arda Havar / Furhgill Zeldenrust | 8 | Eerste Divisie | 3.000 | 17 | René van Eck / Wiljan Vloet |
| 2016–17 | Romero Regales | 8 | Eerste Divisie | 2.850 | 14 | Wiljan Vloet |
| 2017–18 | Niek Vossebelt | 15 | Eerste Divisie | 2.790 | 11 | Wil Boessen |
| 2018–19 | Stefano Beltrame | 14 | Eerste Divisie | 3.790 | 4 | Wil Boessen / Erik van der Ven & Paul Beekmans ao |
| 2019–20 | Rúben Rodrigues | 12 | Eerste Divisie | 2.941 | 12 | Erik van der Ven |
| 2020–21 | Jizz Hornkamp | 20 | Eerste Divisie | | 19 | Erik van der Ven / William van Overbeek / Jack de Gier |
| 2021–22 | Roy Kuijpers | 9 | Eerste Divisie | 3.337 | 11 | Jack de Gier |
| 2022–23 | Joey Konings | 10 | Eerste Divisie | 4.164 | 19 | Jack de Gier / Tomasz Kaczmarek |
| 2023–24 | Kacper Kostorz | 16 | Eerste Divisie | 4.865 | 19 | Tomasz Kaczmarek / William van Overbeek ao |
| 2024–25 | Byron Burgering | 10 | Eerste Divisie | 5.772 | 9 | David Nascimento / Ulrich Landvreugd |
| 2025–26 | Kévin Monzialo | 16 | Eerste Divisie | 5.518 | 9 | Ulrich Landvreugd |

== See also ==
- Dutch football league teams
