= Jan van Grinsven =

Dutch footballer and manager

Personal information
- Date of birth: 27 February 1960 (age 66)
- Place of birth: Den Dungen, Netherlands
- Height: 6 ft 1 in (1.85 m)
- Position: Goalkeeper

Senior career*
Years	Team	Apps	(Gls)
1981–1992	FC Den Bosch	311	(1)
1992–1995	MVV	69	(0)
1995–1999	FC Den Bosch	104	(0)
Total		484	(1)

Managerial career
- 2005–: FC Den Bosch (Assistant)
- * Club domestic league appearances and goals

Jan van Grinsven (born 27 February 1960 in Den Dungen, North Brabant) is a Dutch retired football goalkeeper, who played for FC Den Bosch (1981–1992 and 1995–1999) and MVV Maastricht (1992–1995) and scored one goal in his career. He retired in 1999, having played 484 games in Dutch professional football, and soon afterwards became an assistant coach who worked for FC Den Bosch.

Nicknamed De Sliert van de Vliert due to his lanky frame, van Grinsven was the goalkeeper who conceded Marco van Basten's spectacular overhead kick in November 1986. He also scored an iconic injury-time equaliser in a game against Roda JC in the 1985-86 season.

He was once called-up for the Netherlands national football team in 1986, but remained on the bench.
