= Gert Kruys =

Dutch footballer (born 1961)

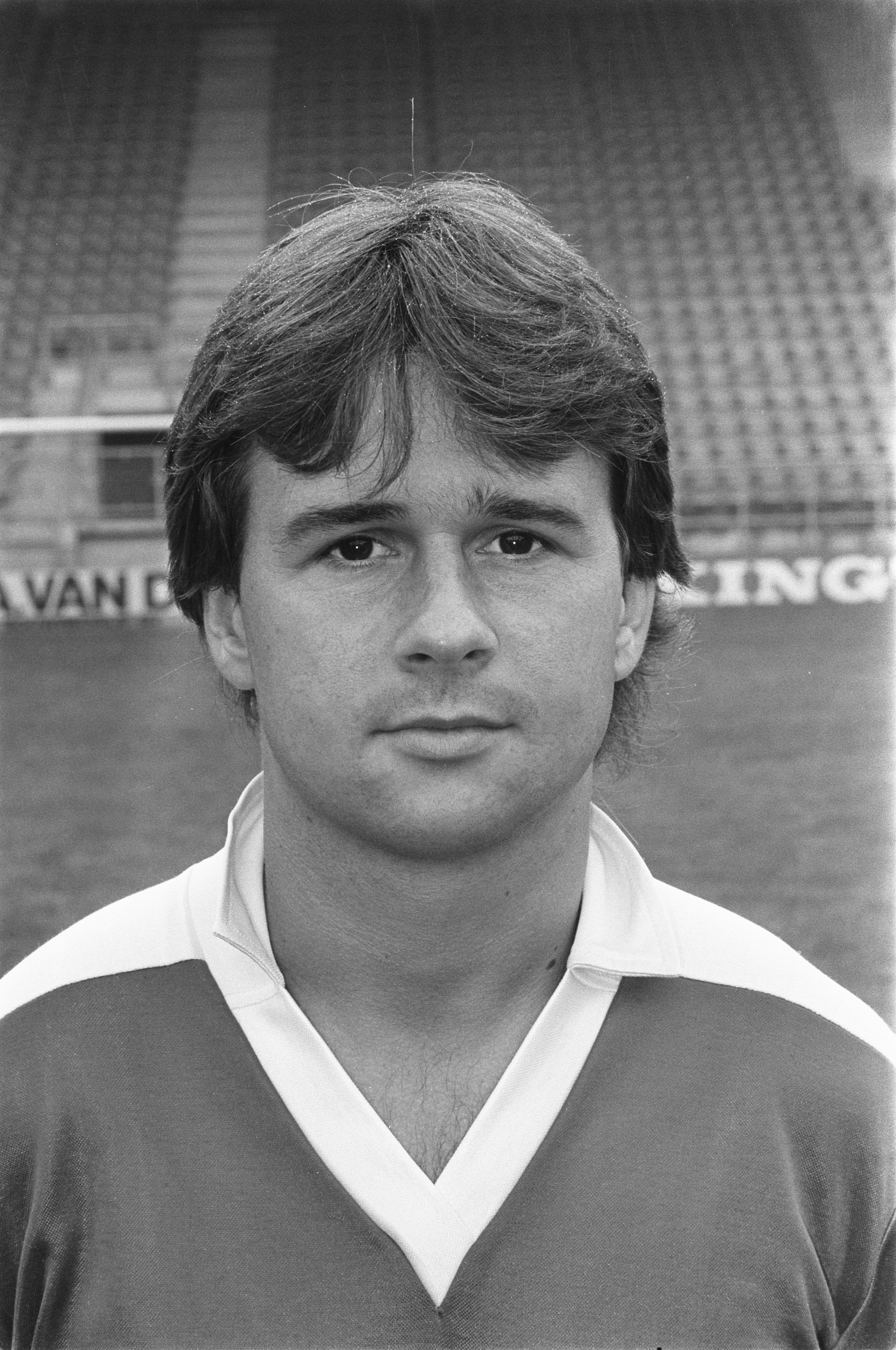
- Kruys in 1984

Personal information
- Date of birth: 8 May 1961 (age 65)
- Place of birth: Utrecht, Netherlands
- Position: Midfielder

Team information
- Current team: Montfoort SV '19 (Manager)

Senior career*
Years	Team	Apps	(Gls)
1978–1986	FC Utrecht	144	(20)
1986–1987	RKC Waalwijk	16	(2)
1987–1988	FC Utrecht	25	(2)
Total		185	(24)

Managerial career
- 1998–2002: Cambuur
- 2002–2004: FC Den Bosch
- 2004–2005: De Graafschap
- 2006–2010: FC Dordrecht
- 2010–2012: FC Volendam
- 2013: FC Dordrecht
- 2013–2014: IJsselmeervogels
- 2014: Sparta Rotterdam
- 2016–2019: DOVO
- 2020: IJsselmeervogels
- 2020–2021: DHSC
- 2022: De Treffers (caretaker)
- 2022–2024: Montvoort SV '19
- 2024–2025: VVOG
- * Club domestic league appearances and goals

Gert Kruys (born 8 May 1961) is a Dutch football manager and former player.

== Career ==
Kruys played his entire career for FC Utrecht (1978–1988), except for one short spell at RKC Waalwijk (1987). He retired in 1988, and soon afterwards became a coach who worked for AGOVV Apeldoorn, Cambuur Leeuwarden, FC Den Bosch, De Graafschap, FC Dordrecht and FC Volendam. After being coach of Topklasse side IJsselmeervogels, Kruys returned in professional football by becoming coach of Sparta Rotterdam on 1 January 2014. However, he was sacked on 29 November 2014.

== Personal life ==
His son, Rick Kruys, was also a professional footballer.
