= Jan Poortvliet =

Dutch footballer and manager (born 1955)

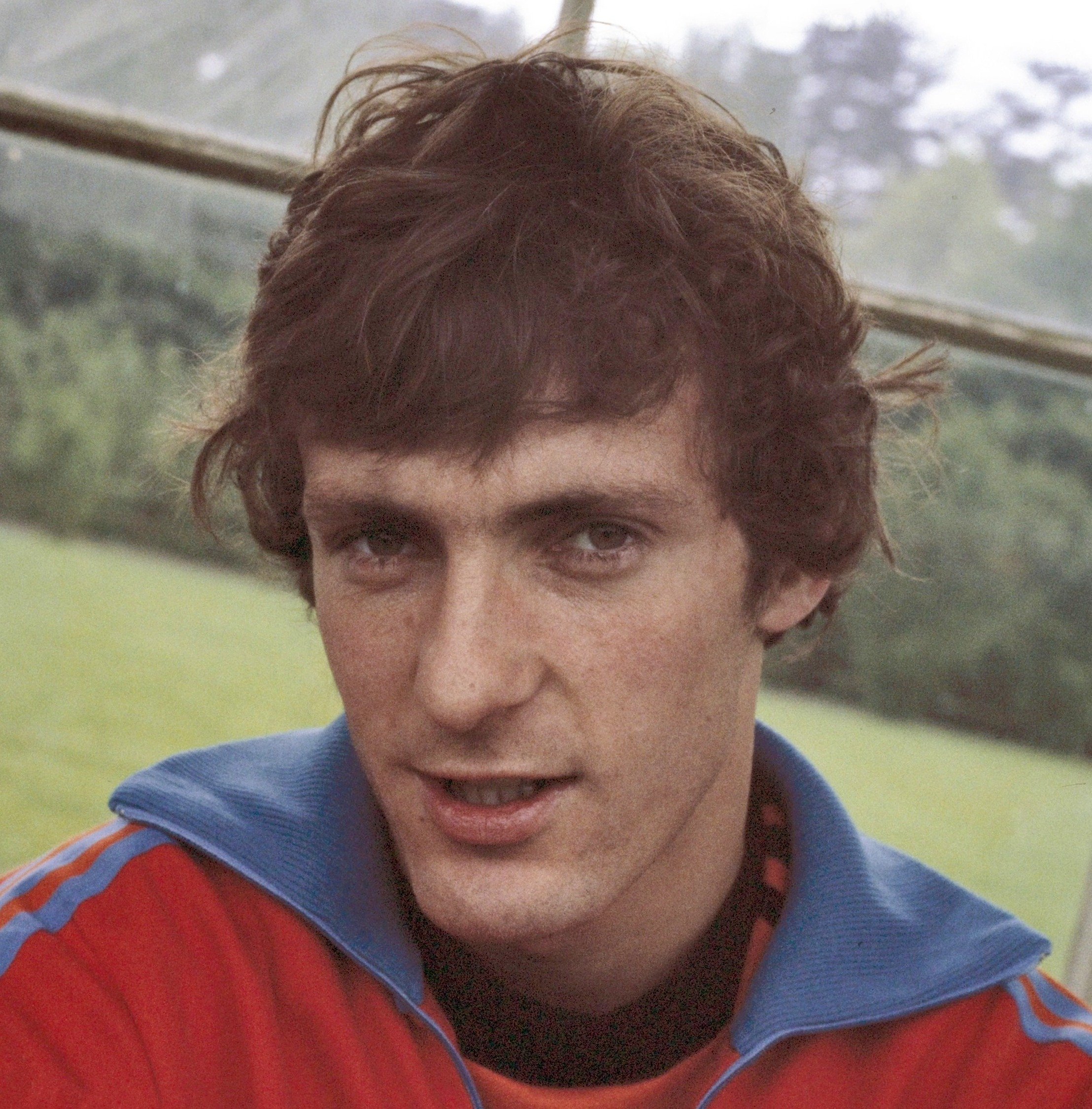
- Poortvliet in 1978

Personal information
- Date of birth: 21 September 1955 (age 71)
- Place of birth: Arnemuiden, Netherlands
- Height: 5 ft 11 in (1.80 m)
- Position: Defender

Team information
- Current team: FC Eindhoven (head coach)

Youth career
- 1963–1972: VV Arnemuiden
- 1972–1974: PSV

Senior career*
Years	Team	Apps	(Gls)
1974–1983	PSV	264	(41)
1983–1984	Roda JC	20	(1)
1984–1987	Nîmes	97	(15)
1987–1988	Royal Antwerp	34	(7)
1988–1989	Cannes	36	(3)
1989–1990	Eendracht Aalst	20	(3)
1990–1992	VCV Zeeland	60	(4)
Total		531	(74)

International career
1978–1982	Netherlands	19	(1)

Managerial career
- 1996–1997: RBC Roosendaal
- 2000–2001: Den Bosch
- 2002–2005: Telstar
- 2007–2008: Helmond Sport
- 2008–2009: Southampton
- 2009–2010: FC Eindhoven
- 2010–2012: Telstar
- 2012–2013: Den Bosch
- 2014–2015: Goes
- 2016: Qingdao Red Lions
- 2018–2021: RKSV Nuenen
- 2021–2024: FC Eindhoven (U18)
- 2024–2025: FC Eindhoven (U21)
- 2025–: FC Eindhoven
Medal record
Representing Netherlands
FIFA World Cup
Runner-up	1978 Argentina
- * Club domestic league appearances and goals

Jan Poortvliet (Dutch pronunciation: [ˈjɑm ˈpoːrtflit]; born 21 September 1955) is a Dutch professional football coach and former player who is the head coach of Eerste Divisie club FC Eindhoven. As a player he spent most of his career with PSV, with whom he won three Eredivisie titles and the 1977–78 UEFA Cup, and he was a member of the Netherlands team that finished as runners-up at the 1978 FIFA World Cup. After later spells in France and Belgium he retired in 1992 and turned to coaching, managing clubs including Den Bosch, Telstar and the English club Southampton, before settling into a long association with FC Eindhoven.

== Early life ==
Poortvliet was born on 21 September 1955 in Arnemuiden, Zeeland, the eldest of seven children; his father, Klaas, had been a prolific amateur forward in the town. He began playing for the local club VV Arnemuiden at the age of seven and worked as an apprentice carpenter. Spotted as a centre-back at a KNVB trial for 16- and 17-year-olds in Zeist, he signed for PSV in 1972 and joined the reserve team.

== Club career ==
=== PSV ===
Poortvliet made his competitive debut for PSV in 1975, scoring in a 5–1 win away to local rivals Eindhoven. Under coach Kees Rijvers he became a regular in a successful side, winning three Eredivisie titles and the KNVB Cup. The peak of his career came in 1977–78, when PSV won the UEFA Cup, beating Bastia of France 3–0 in the final after a goalless first leg; in the semi-final against Barcelona, Rijvers credited Poortvliet with marking Johan Cruyff out of the tie. He lost his regular place during the 1983–84 season and left PSV in November 1983.

=== Later clubs ===
Poortvliet joined Roda JC in November 1983, scoring once in his only season in Limburg. He then spent several years abroad, playing for Nîmes in France from 1984, followed by Royal Antwerp in Belgium, AS Cannes back in France, and the Belgian club Eendracht Aalst. He ended his playing career in his native Zeeland with VC Vlissingen, which played two seasons as a professional club—the only one the province has had—competing as VCV Zeeland in its second season before the venture folded in 1992.

== International career ==
Poortvliet made his debut for the Netherlands on 20 May 1978 in a 1–0 win over Austria, and was selected for the 1978 FIFA World Cup in Argentina, where the Dutch reached the final and lost 3–1 after extra time to the hosts. He also appeared at UEFA Euro 1980 and won 19 caps in all, scoring once, against Belgium in 1979.

== Managerial career ==
=== Early management ===
Poortvliet began coaching in professional football with RBC Roosendaal in 1996–97. The most successful spell of his managerial career came at FC Den Bosch, whom he led to the Eerste Divisie title and promotion to the Eredivisie in 2000–01. From December 2002 to June 2005 he worked at Telstar, then a satellite club of AZ, which also paid his salary, and after spells in amateur football he was appointed head coach of Helmond Sport for the 2007–08 season.

=== Southampton ===
On 29 May 2008, Poortvliet was announced as head coach of English Championship club Southampton, replacing Nigel Pearson, with Mark Wotte taking over the academy. He was the club's tenth head coach in ten years and its first from outside the United Kingdom. The appointment was complicated by his existing contract at Helmond Sport, which had not given him permission to negotiate; after his initial offer of compensation was rejected, a KNVB arbitration panel ruled that he could take the role on payment of £60,000 to Helmond, which he did.

After an opening defeat to Cardiff City, Poortvliet recorded his first win three days later, beating Exeter City 3–1 in the League Cup; his first league win followed at Derby County in August 2008. Following a run of one win in 14 home games, he resigned on 23 January 2009, with Wotte taking over.

=== Return to the Netherlands ===
On 15 June 2009, Poortvliet was appointed manager of Eerste Divisie club FC Eindhoven, leading the side to the promotion/relegation play-offs. In June 2010 he took over at Telstar, whose costs were then underwritten by AZ, remaining until June 2012, when he returned to FC Den Bosch for a season. He subsequently managed the amateur club VV Goes, had a spell with Qingdao Red Lions in China in 2016, and coached the amateur side RKSV Nuenen.

=== Return to Eindhoven ===
Poortvliet returned to FC Eindhoven's staff in 2021, coaching the club's under-18 team and, from 2024, its under-21 side. In late October 2025, after head coach Maurice Verberne suffered a broken leg, the 70-year-old Poortvliet stepped up as the club's first-team head coach; when Eindhoven decided in February 2026 not to renew Verberne's contract, Poortvliet remained in charge for the rest of the season. In April 2026 he signed a one-year contract extension, keeping him as head coach until mid-2027, with the club citing his role in integrating young players.

== Personal life ==
Poortvliet is the uncle of the footballer Jan Paul van Hecke. Alongside his coaching he has worked as a parcel courier in the Eindhoven area.

== Career statistics ==
=== International ===
Appearances and goals by national team and year
National team	Year	Apps	Goals
Netherlands	1978	10	0
Netherlands	1979	5	1
Netherlands	1980	1	0
Netherlands	1981	2	0
Netherlands	1982	1	0
Total		19	1

Scores and results list the Netherlands' goal tally first, score column indicates score after each Poortvliet goal.

List of international goals scored by Jan Poortvliet
No.	Date	Venue	Opponent	Score	Result	Competition
1	26 September 1979	De Kuip, Rotterdam, Netherlands	Belgium	1–0	1–0	Friendly

== Honours ==
PSV

- Eredivisie: 1974–75, 1975–76, 1977–78
- KNVB Cup: 1975–76
- UEFA Cup: 1977–78

Netherlands

- FIFA World Cup runner-up: 1978
