= Sheddy Barglan =

Sudanese footballer

Personal information
- Full name: Sheddy Ezzeldin Daldom Hamad Barglan
- Date of birth: 3 October 2002 (age 24)
- Place of birth: Lelystad, Netherlands
- Height: 1.78 m (5 ft 10 in)
- Position: Midfielder

Team information
- Current team: Den Bosch
- Number: 2

Youth career
- –2013: Blauw Geel
- 2017–2023: Den Bosch

Senior career*
Years	Team	Apps	(Gls)
2023–	Den Bosch	59	(2)

International career^{‡}
2023–	Sudan	7	(0)
- * Club domestic league appearances and goals as of 15 August 2026 ‡ National team caps and goals as of 19:23, 3 January 2026 (UTC)

Sheddy Ezzeldin Daldom Hamad Barglan (Arabic: شيدي عز الدين دلدوم حمد برجلان; born 3 October 2002) is a professional footballer who plays as a midfielder for Eerste Divisie club Den Bosch. Born in the Netherlands, he plays for the Sudan national team.

== Club career ==
Barglan was born in Lelystad, Netherlands but moved to Veghel at age three. As a youth he played for local club Blauw Geel '38 until 2013 when he was spotted by FC Den Bosch and signed by the club. He signed his first professional contract for Den Bosch in 2024 after over ten years in the academy. He made his league debut for the club on 10 February of that year, coming on as a substitute against Jong Ajax. In September 2024, it was announced that the club and player had signed a contract extension through 2027 with a club option for an addition season after the player had attracted significant interest from other clubs.

== International career ==
Barglan was born in the Netherlands to a father from Sudan and a half-Sudanese mother. He was first called up to the Sudan national team for a training camp in Saudi Arabia in 2022, shortly after joining FC Den Bosch. He made his senior international debut for the nation on 15 October 2023 in a friendly against Tanzania.

=== International career statistics ===
As of match played 3 January 2026

National team	Year	Apps	Goals
Sudan	2023	2	0
Sudan	2024	1	0
Sudan	2025	1	0
Sudan	2026	1	0
Total		3	1
