= Najim Haidary =

Afghan footballer

Personal information
- Full name: Abdul Najim Haidary
- Date of birth: 26 December 1999 (age 26)
- Place of birth: Amsterdam, Netherlands
- Height: 1.85 m (6 ft 1 in)
- Positions: Centre back; left back

Team information
- Current team: SteDoCo

Youth career
- –2018: Excelsior

Senior career*
Years	Team	Apps	(Gls)
2018–2019	Barendrecht	3	(0)
2019–2022	Den Bosch	0	(0)
2022	ASWH	15	(0)
2022–2023	ENAD	2	(0)
2023	Ariana FC		
2023	Unitas	8	(0)
2024–2026	Capelle		
2026–	SteDoCo		

International career^{‡}
2019–	Afghanistan	14	(0)
- * Club domestic league appearances and goals as of 16 November 2024 ‡ National team caps and goals as of 21 September 2026

Abdul Najim Haidary (Dari: عبدالنجم حیدری; born 26 December 1999) is a footballer who plays as a centre back for SteDoCo. Born in Amsteram and raised in Capelle aan den IJssel, the Netherlands, he represents the Afghanistan national team.

== Club career ==
Having progressed through the academy of Excelsior, Haidary joined Tweede Divisie side BVV Barendrecht in 2018, going on to make his debut for the club later the same year. After three appearances, he joined Eerste Divisie side FC Den Bosch in 2019, but during his time with the club he suffered a serious knee injury which side-lined him for eight months, and he was unable to make his debut.

In February 2022, he returned to the Tweede Divisie with ASWH. However, despite making fifteen appearances, he could not help prevent the club being relegated to the Derde Divisie. Ahead of the 2022–23 season, in August 2022, he moved to Cyprus, joining Cypriot Third Division side ENAD.

After only two appearances for ENAD, Haidary moved to Sweden, joining Ettan Fotboll side Ariana.

In summer 2026, Haidary joined SteDoCo from fellow amateur side Capelle.

== International career ==
Haidary was eligible to represent both Afghanistan and the Netherlands at international level, and during his time in the academy of Excelsior Rotterdam, his coach, Marinus Barendregt, was in contact with then-manager of the Afghanistan national football team, Anoush Dastgir, informing Dastgir that Haidary was a player in the team with Afghan roots.

In December 2018, having made his debut in the Tweede Divisie for Barendrecht, but still mostly featuring for their second team, Haidary received a call-up to the Afghanistan national football team for a training camp. The following year, he made his international debut in a 1–1 friendly draw with Tajikistan, and by October of the same year, he had already featured in two 2022 FIFA World Cup qualification games.

Following his call-up in November 2021, he stated that he was proud to represent Afghanistan, and that he played for the country, not for the Taliban, who had taken control of the nation earlier in the year, forcing the national team to play their home games in other countries.

== Personal life ==
Though he was born in Amsterdam, Haidary's parents live in Afghanistan, and in August 2021, following the 2021 Taliban offensive, he stated that the situation was "very scary" and that he feared for his family.

== Career statistics ==
=== Club ===
As of 15 September 2023.

Appearances and goals by club, season and competition
Club	Season	League			Cup		Other		Total	
Club	Season	Division	Apps	Goals	Apps	Goals	Apps	Goals	Apps	Goals
BVV Barendrecht	2018–19	Tweede Divisie	3	0	0	0	0	0	3	0
FC Den Bosch	2019–20	Eerste Divisie	0	0	0	0	0	0	0	0
FC Den Bosch	2020–21	Eerste Divisie	0	0	0	0	0	0	0	0
FC Den Bosch	2021–22	Eerste Divisie	0	0	0	0	0	0	0	0
FC Den Bosch	Total		0	0	0	0	0	0	0	0
ASWH	2021–22	Tweede Divisie	15	0	0	0	0	0	15	0
ENAD	2022–23	Cypriot Third Division	2	0	0	0	0	0	2	0
Ariana	2023	Ettan Fotboll	0	0	0	0	0	0	0	0
Career total			20	0	0	0	0	0	20	0

=== International ===
As of matches played 17 October 2023.

Appearances and goals by national team and year
National team	Year	Apps	Goals
Afghanistan	2019	4	0
Afghanistan	2020	–	
Afghanistan	2021	2	0
Afghanistan	2022	2	0
Afghanistan	2023	2	0
Total		8	0
