= Ziad Noujeim =

Lebanese journalist

Dr. Ziad Eva Fouad Noujeim (or Ziad Njeim, Arabic: زياد نجيم, born on 2 November 1958) is a Lebanese oral surgeon and journalist, who worked as lead anchor at TV stations such as MTV, LBC, OTV, Al Hurra and MashreqTV. He hosted the political show Istifta (استفتاء) which resulted in the closure of the MTV channel, then he moved to Alhurra TV, where he broadcast the program sa'aa horra (ساعة حرة).

== Biography ==
He was born on 2 November 1958 in the town of Douris in Baalbek, Lebanon, to a Maronite Christian family.

In the mid-80's, he began his media career when he was discovered by the television director Simon Asmar, and presented many entertainment programs.

In 1986, he started hosting the "Iftah Ya Simsim" (افتح يا سمسم) program on LBC, and he became famous in "Al Shater Ye'ki" (الشاطر يحكي) on MTV.

Then he hosted the political talk show "Istifta'" (استفتاء "Referendum") on MTV, which one of its episodes resulted in the closure of the channel by court order in 2002, with charges against the station and Ziad himself.

Then he moved in 2003 to Alhurra TV channel, where he broadcast the program "sa'aa horra" (ساعة حرة, "Free Hour"), which dealt with taboo topics in the Arab world like incest and same-sex marriage.

== Television ==
- 1986 Iftah Ya Simsim (افتح يا سمسم)
- 1989 El Dounia Doulab (الدنيا دولاب)
- 1993 Ana el Chaab (أنا الشعب)
- 1994 Al Chater ye'ki (الشاطر يحكي)
- 2002 Istifta (استفتاء) (MTV)
- 2003 Dounia (دنيا)
- 2004 Sa'aa Hurra (ساعة حرة) (AlHurra)
- 2009 Masa el Hurrieh (مساء الحرية)
- 2012 Mouhami Al Shitan (محامي الشيطان) (OTV)

== Radio ==
He worked for the first time in the radio in 2013 with the program "Astraji" on Sawt El Ghad, then moved in January 2014 to OTV to present the same program on TV.

== Dentistry ==
Ziad is also an oral surgeon, lecturer and research department chairperson at the Lebanese University and Dental School in Beirut, and editor-in-chief of the Journal of the Lebanese Dental Association. He also obtained the European Board of Oral Surgery diploma, which is the highest scientific certificate awarded within European societies for oral surgery.
