= Stefan Jansen =

Dutch footballer (born 1972)

Personal information
- Date of birth: July 4, 1972 (age 54)
- Place of birth: Veghel, Netherlands
- Height: 1.78 m (5 ft 10 in)
- Position: Striker

Senior career*
| Years | Team | Apps | (Gls) |
| 1990–1993 | Roda JC | 44 | (8) |
| 1993–1994 | Den Bosch | 39 | (19) |
| 1995–1996 | Cambuur | 54 | (8) |
| 1996–1997 | Salernitana | 16 | (1) |
| 1997 | Ischia Isolaverde | 0 | (0) |
| 1998 | Cambuur | 3 | (0) |
| 1998–2001 | TOP Oss | 69 | (43) |
| 2001–2002 | NEC | 22 | (2) |
| 2002–2004 | Den Bosch | 66 | (45) |
| 2004–2005 | Bregenz | 22 | (11) |
| 2005–2007 | Zwolle | 44 | (4) |
- * Club domestic league appearances and goals

Stefan Jansen (born 4 July 1972) is a Dutch former professional footballer who played as a forward

He started his professional career in the 1990-1991 season for Roda JC. Later on he played for FC Den Bosch, Cambuur Leeuwarden, Salernitana, Ischia Isolaverde, TOP Oss, NEC Nijmegen, Den Bosch again, SW Bregenz and FC Zwolle.

== Honours ==
Den Bosch

- Eerste Divisie: 2003–04
