= 2000–01 Eerste Divisie =

45th season of the second-tier football league in Netherlands

Eerste Divisie
- Season: 2000–01
- Champions: FC Den Bosch
- Promoted: FC Den Bosch
- Goals: 1,018
- Average goals/game: 3.32

The Dutch Eerste Divisie in the 2000–01 season was contested by 18 teams. FC Den Bosch won the championship.

== New entrants ==
Relegated from the 1999–2000 Eredivisie

- Cambuur Leeuwarden
- FC Den Bosch
- MVV

== League standings ==
Pos	Team	Pld	W	D	L	GF	GA	GD	Pts	Promotion or qualification
1	FC Den Bosch	34	23	6	5	64	25	+39	75	Promotion to Eredivisie
2	Excelsior	34	20	6	8	89	63	+26	66	Play-offs
3	FC Zwolle	34	18	10	6	73	41	+32	64	Play-offs
4	Cambuur Leeuwarden	34	15	9	10	55	52	+3	54	Play-offs
5	FC Volendam	34	16	5	13	58	48	+10	53	Play-offs
6	Go Ahead Eagles	34	16	5	13	62	63	−1	53	Play-offs
7	Telstar	34	15	8	11	47	48	−1	53	Play-offs
8	Helmond Sport	34	13	9	12	69	50	+19	48	
9	FC Eindhoven	34	12	9	13	58	57	+1	45	
10	TOP Oss	34	14	3	17	59	67	−8	45	
11	FC Emmen	34	11	8	15	53	64	−11	41	
12	Dordrecht '90	34	10	10	14	58	59	−1	40	
13	MVV	34	12	4	18	47	58	−11	40	
14	BV Veendam	34	11	6	17	54	69	−15	39	
15	Heracles Almelo	34	10	9	15	38	56	−18	39	
16	ADO Den Haag	34	9	9	16	51	71	−20	36	
17	HFC Haarlem	34	8	10	16	46	64	−18	34	
18	VVV-Venlo	34	8	4	22	37	63	−26	28	

== Promotion/relegation play-offs ==
In the promotion/relegation competition, eight entrants (six from this league and two from the Eredivisie) entered in two groups. The group winners were promoted to the Eredivisie.

Group 1
Pos	Team	Pld	W	D	L	GF	GA	GD	Pts	Qualification
1	Fortuna Sittard	6	3	1	2	9	6	+3	10	Remain in Eredivisie
2	FC Zwolle	6	2	3	1	6	4	+2	9	
3	FC Volendam	6	3	0	3	6	4	+2	9	
4	Telstar	6	1	2	3	7	10	−3	5	

Group 2
Pos	Team	Pld	W	D	L	GF	GA	GD	Pts	Qualification
1	Sparta Rotterdam	6	4	1	1	14	8	+6	13	Remain in Eredivisie
2	Cambuur Leeuwarden	6	3	0	3	11	13	−2	9	
3	Excelsior	6	2	1	3	14	14	0	7	
4	Go Ahead Eagles	6	1	2	3	9	13	−4	5	

Source: rsssf.com

== Attendances ==
#	Club	Average
1	Cambuur	5,062
2	Heracles	4,672
3	Emmen	4,587
4	Zwolle	4,276
5	Veendam	4,028
6	Go Ahead	3,574
7	Den Bosch	3,333
8	MVV	2,762
9	Volendam	2,397
10	Eindhoven	2,342
11	Helmond	2,309
12	ADO	2,133
13	Oss	2,087
14	Telstar	1,875
15	Excelsior	1,794
16	VVV	1,780
17	Haarlem	1,522
18	Dordrecht	1,476

== See also ==
- 2000–01 Eredivisie
- 2000–01 KNVB Cup
