= Noujaim =

Noujaim is a Lebanese Maronite Christian surname meaning "small star". Notable people with the surname include:

- Fares D. Noujaim, Lebanese-American banker
- Guy-Paul Noujaim, (born 1935), Lebanese Maronite Catholic eparch and Emeritus Auxiliary Bishop
- Jehane Noujaim, (born c. 1980), Egyptian-American documentary film director
- George N. Noujaim, American politician from Connecticut, served on the Board of Aldermen 2011-2013 and then 2017 onward, Real Estate Broker, Insurance professional, philanthropist, community leader
- Selim Noujaim, American politician from Connecticut
