= Hendrie Krüzen =

Dutch footballer

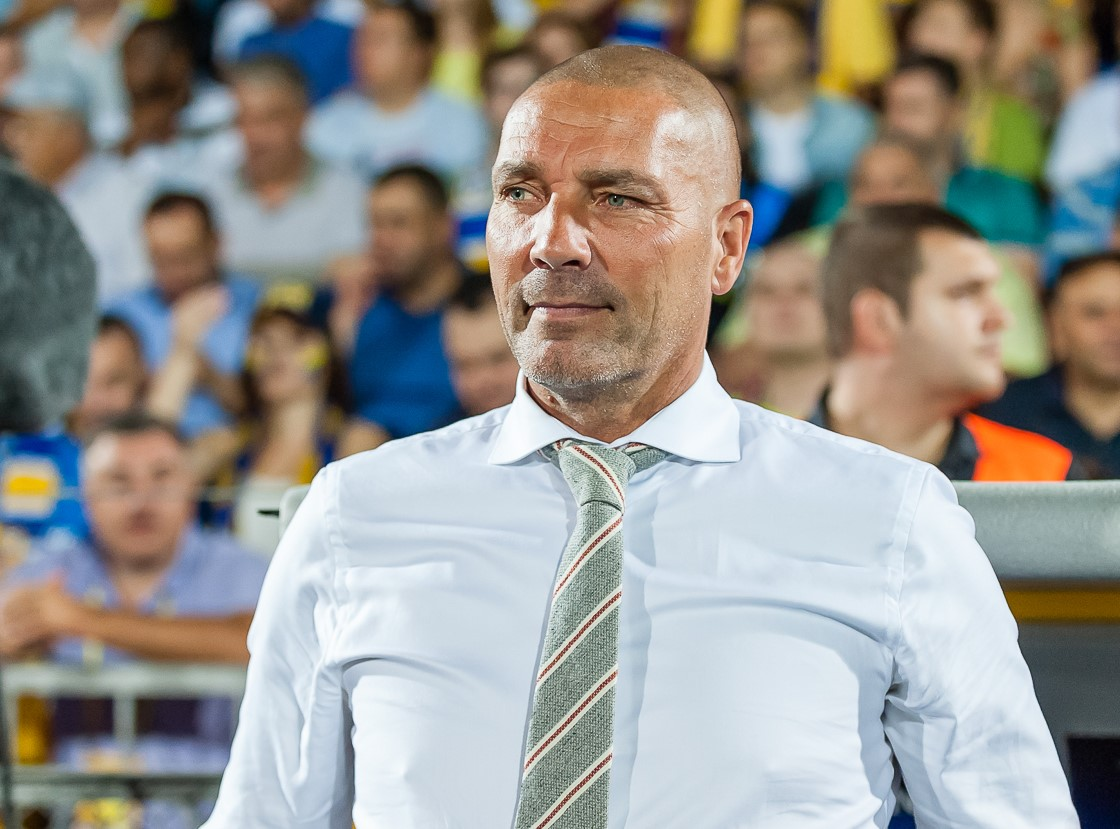
- Krüzen in 2016

Personal information
- Full name: Hendrik Krüzen
- Date of birth: 24 November 1964 (age 61)
- Place of birth: Almelo, Netherlands
- Position: Midfielder

Team information
- Current team: Heracles (assistant manager)

Youth career
- La Première
- Heracles

Senior career*
| Years | Team | Apps | (Gls) |
| 1980–1986 | Heracles | 152 | (25) |
| 1986–1988 | Den Bosch | 67 | (22) |
| 1988–1989 | PSV | 8 | (2) |
| 1989 | → Den Bosch (loan) | 16 | (2) |
| 1989–1991 | Kortrijk | 56 | (15) |
| 1991–1992 | FC Liège | 25 | (3) |
| 1992–1994 | Waregem | 60 | (30) |
| 1994–1995 | Heracles | 46 | (23) |
| 1996 | AZ | 20 | (5) |
| 1997–2000 | Go Ahead Eagles | 106 | (20) |
| 2000–2002 | AGOVV | | |

International career
| 1987–1989 | Netherlands | 5 | (0) |

Managerial career
- 2002–2013: Heracles (assistant)
- 2013–2015: Vitesse (assistant)
- 2015–2016: Heracles (assistant)
- 2016: Maccabi Tel Aviv (assistant)
- 2016–2017: Ajax (assistant)
- 2017: Dortmund (assistant)
- 2018: Netherlands U21 (assistant)
- 2018–2021: Leverkusen (assistant)
- 2021–2022: Lyon (assistant)
- 2022–: Heracles (assistant)
Medal record
Representing Netherlands
UEFA European Championship
| Winner | 1988 West Germany |
- * Club domestic league appearances and goals

Hendrik "Hendrie" Krüzen (born 24 November 1964) is a Dutch former professional footballer who played as a midfielder. He is the assistant manager of Heracles Almelo.

== Club career ==
Krüzen was born in Almelo, Overijssel. He made his senior debuts at only 16, with hometown's Heracles Almelo. After two solid years with FC Den Bosch, scoring in double figures, he signed with Eredivisie giants PSV Eindhoven, appearing rarely as the club won the double in the 1988–89 season, and also being loaned to his previous team.

Krüzen spent the following five years in neighbouring Belgium, representing K.V. Kortrijk, R.F.C. de Liège and K.S.V. Waregem. After the latter's relegation from the top flight, he returned to his country, joining first professional club Heracles, and moving to AZ Alkmaar in January 1996.

In 2002, after a spell in the Dutch second level with Go Ahead Eagles and two years in amateur football, Krüzen retired from football after 20 professional seasons, with totals of 556 games and 148 goals. Immediately afterwards, he returned to his first team, acting as assistant coach for several years.

== International career ==
Krüzen made his debut for the Netherlands on 16 December 1987, in a UEFA Euro 1988 qualifier against Greece (3–0 away win). He was eventually selected by manager Rinus Michels for the final tournament in West Germany, being an unused member as the Dutch national team won the finals. Krüzen earned five caps in total.

== Career statistics ==
=== international ===
Appearances and goals by national team and year
| National team | Year | Apps | Goals |
|---|---|---|---|
| Netherlands | 1987 | 1 | 0 |
| Netherlands | 1988 | 3 | 0 |
| Netherlands | 1989 | 1 | 0 |
| Total | | 5 | 0 |

=== Managerial statistics ===
As of 16 July 2026

Managerial record by team and tenure
| Team | Nat | From | Until | Record | | | | | | | |
| Team | Nat | From | Until | P | W | D | L | GF | GA | GD | Win % |
|---|---|---|---|---|---|---|---|---|---|---|---|
| Heracles (Interim) | (Netherlands) | 25 December 2007 | 31 December 2007 | 2 | 1 | 0 | 1 | 5 | 5 | +0 | 50.00 |
| Heracles (Interim) | (Netherlands) | 13 December 2023 | 20 December 2023 | 1 | 0 | 0 | 1 | 0 | 4 | −4 | 0.00 |
| Heracles (Interim) | (Netherlands) | 27 October 2025 | 30 November 2025 | 5 | 4 | 1 | 0 | 38 | 14 | +24 | 80.00 |
| Total | | | | 8 | 5 | 1 | 2 | 43 | 23 | +20 | 62.50 |

== Honours ==
=== Player ===
Heracles

- Eerste Divisie: 1984-85, 1994-95

PSV

- Eredivisie: 1988-89
- KNVB Cup: 1988-89

Netherlands

- UEFA European Football Championship: 1988

=== Manager ===
Individual

- Eredivisie Manager of the Month: November 2025
