= David Nascimento =

Cape Verdean-Portuguese football coach and former player

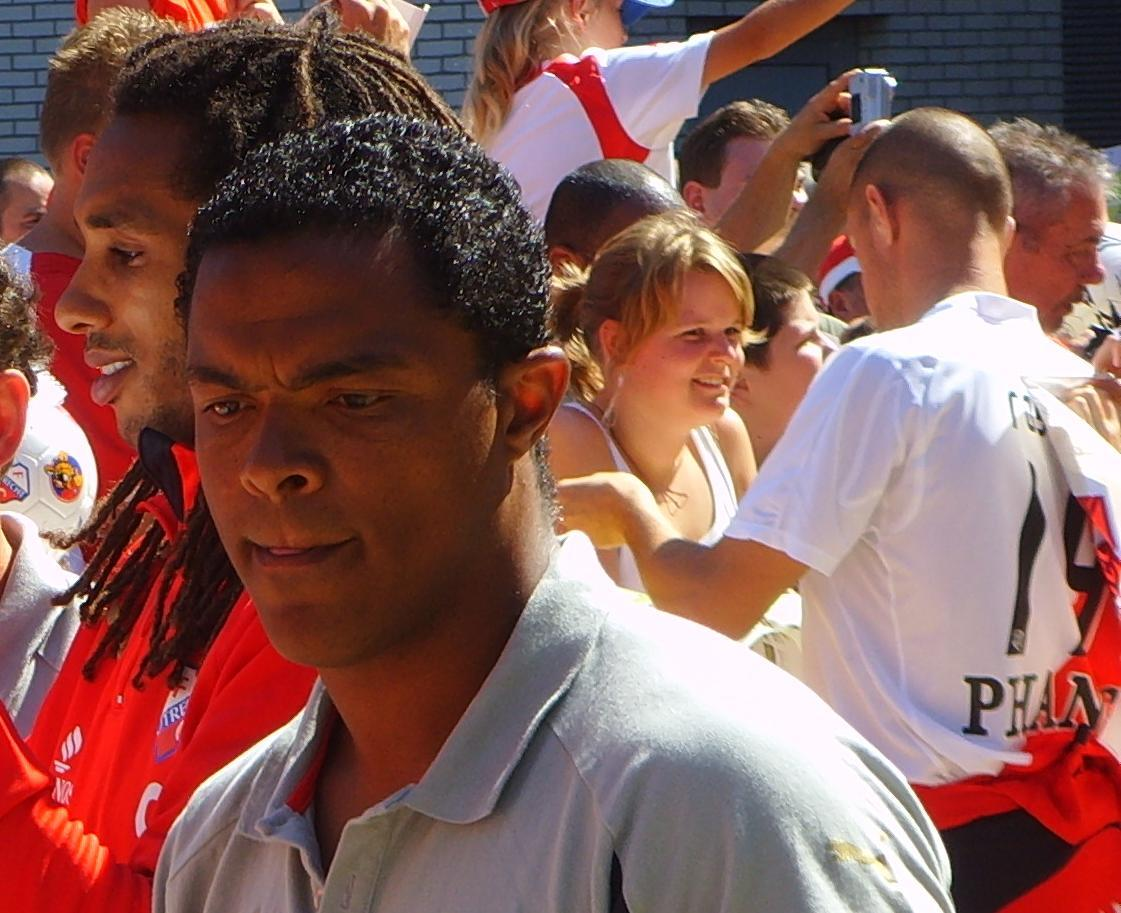
- Nascimento in 2007

Personal information
- Full name: David de Sousa Nascimento
- Date of birth: 16 March 1966 (age 60)
- Place of birth: São Vicente, Cape Verde
- Height: 1.85 m (6 ft 1 in)
- Position: Centre-back

Team information
- Current team: Indonesia U17 (head coach)

Youth career
- Amora

Senior career*
Years	Team	Apps	(Gls)
1983–1985	Amora		
1985–1987	Vitória de Setúbal		
1987–1989	Barreirense		
1989–1990	Vitória de Guimarães		
1990–1991	Benfica e Castelo Branco		
1991–1992	RKC Waalwijk	16	(1)
1992–1994	Roda JC	55	(0)
1994–1998	FC Utrecht	123	(5)
1998–2002	RKC Waalwijk	106	(4)
2002–2003	RBC Roosendaal	25	(1)
2003–2005	Sparta Rotterdam	37	(2)

Managerial career
- 2005: Sparta Rotterdam (caretaker)
- 2006–2009: Jong Utrecht
- 2010–2011: Sparta Nijkerk
- 2016: Malta U19
- 2018–2020: FC Eindhoven
- 2021–2024: Jordan Women
- 2024: FC Den Bosch
- 2025–2026: Jordan Women
- 2026–: Indonesia U17
- * Club domestic league appearances and goals

David de Sousa Nascimento (born 16 March 1966), or simply Nascimento, is a Portuguese football manager and former executive and player who played as a defender. He is currently head coach of the Indonesia national under-17 team.

Born in São Vicente, Cape Verde, he had a long career as a player in both Portugal and the Netherlands, having played over 500 matches. Afterwards, he also worked in various managerial positions in the Netherlands, Mexico and South Africa.

== Playing career ==
Nascimento started his career in Portugal. He turned professional at the age of 17 representing Vitória de Setúbal and Vitória de Guimarães a few years later. In the 1991–92 season, he decided to join Dutch Eredivisie club RKC Waalwijk. He stayed there one season, before moving on to Roda JC, during which period he was called up for the Portugal national team. In 1994, he moved to Utrecht, where he played four seasons and grew into a key player. In the 1998–99 season – after Nascimento lost his place in the Utrecht starting line-up under head coach Mark Wotte – manager Martin Jol facilitated his return to RKC, where he was made team captain. Three seasons later, he signed with RBC Roosendaal where he would stay for one season before joining Sparta Rotterdam. There, he decided to retire from playing at the age of 38 having played over 500 official matches.

== Managerial career ==
Having ended his career as professional player, Nascimento started the 2004–05 season as coach of Sparta Rotterdam under-15 team. With this team he won the Nike Tournament and therefore qualified to compete against other European Tournament winners such as Sporting CP, Manchester United and Juventus. At the end of this season, Nascimento and Adri van Tiggelen took over from Sparta first-team coach Mike Snoei and were asked to lead Sparta to promotion to the Eredivisie. Sparta won all their play-off matches resulting in a promotion to the highest level. The next season, Nascimento was an understudy to coach Louis van Gaal at AZ. In the 2006–07 season, Nascimento became coach of the FC Utrecht under-18 team, which finished in second place in the national competition for under-18 teams. Also he was appointed first-team assistant by manager Foeke Booy, a position in which he stayed until the end of 2008. In 2009, Nascimento received the highest coaching diploma, the UEFA Pro License.

On 22 October 2010, Nascimento was appointed new head coach of fourth-tier Topklasse club Sparta Nijkerk, succeeding the dismissed Raymond Schuurman. In the 2011–12 season, he became head of youth development for South African club Mamelodi Sundowns. From June 2012 to February 2013, Nascimento was assistant to John van 't Schip at Mexican club Guadalajara. He shortly coached the Malta national under-19 team during the 2016 UEFA European Under-19 Championship qualifiers.

On 22 January 2018, Nascimento was appointed head coach of FC Eindhoven as successor to Wilfred van Leeuwen. He signed a contract until the end of the 2017–18 season with an option to extend. He was succeeded by Ernie Brandts in July 2019.

In October 2021, Nascimento was appointed head coach of the Jordan women's national team.

On 30 April 2024, Nascimento was appointed as new head coach of FC Den Bosch, starting on 1 July 2024.

== Executive career ==
On 7 May 2014, Cypriot side APOEL appointed Nascimento as the club's new technical director. On 27 August 2014, his contract with APOEL was terminated by mutual consent.
