= Ad Zonderland =

Dutch football manager (1940–2007)

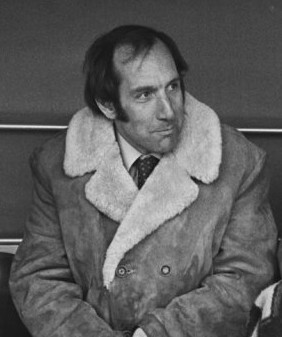
- Zonderland in 1976

Personal information
- Date of birth: 2 October 1940
- Place of birth: Haarlem, Netherlands
- Date of death: 15 August 2007 (aged 66)
- Place of death: Borne, Netherlands

Managerial career
- Years: Team
- 1964–1967: JOS
- 1967–1971: De Graafschap
- 1971–1976: Feyenoord (assistant)
- 1973: Feyenoord (interim)
- 1976: Feyenoord (interim)
- 1976–1978: FC Den Bosch
- 1980–1981: FC Den Bosch

Ad Zonderland (2 October 1940 – 15 August 2007) was a Dutch football manager and football administrator. He worked for several Dutch football clubs, most notably Feyenoord (as assistant and interim manager) and Ajax (as coordinator of their Ghana and South Africa academies).

== Managerial career ==
Zonderland started his managerial career with JOS and then moved to De Graafschap, where he became first team manager in 1967. Here, he would become known for "discovering" Guus Hiddink as a player, convincing him to switch from youth coach to professional footballer. He also led the club to promotion to the Eerste Divisie by winning the Tweede Divisie in the 1968–69 season. In 1971, he was contracted by Feyenoord as assistant manager. On two occasions, he acted as interim manager: in 1973, after Ernst Happel left the club, and in 1976, when Antoni Brzeżańczyk departed.

Zonderland then became manager of Eerste Divisie club FC Den Bosch, a post he fulfilled for two seasons between 1976 and 1978. He subsequently became general director, a position he would hold for nine years aside from a temporary return as manager from 1980 to 1981.

== Later career ==
In 1990, Zonderland was hired as director of Heracles Almelo. Between 1992 and 1995, he served FC Utrecht in the same capacity. Subsequently, Zonderland was appointed by Ajax to coordinate their new football academy in Ghana. As such, he appeared in the 2000 documentary Ajax: Hark the Herald Angel Sings. After four years in Ghana, in 2002, Zonderland was appointed "director of the coaches" at Ajax Cape Town in South Africa.

Zonderland died in Borne on 15 August 2007, aged 66, of a terminal illness.

== Managerial honours ==
De Graafschap

- Tweede Divisie winners: 1968–69
