= Mark Wotte =

Dutch football manager (born 1960)

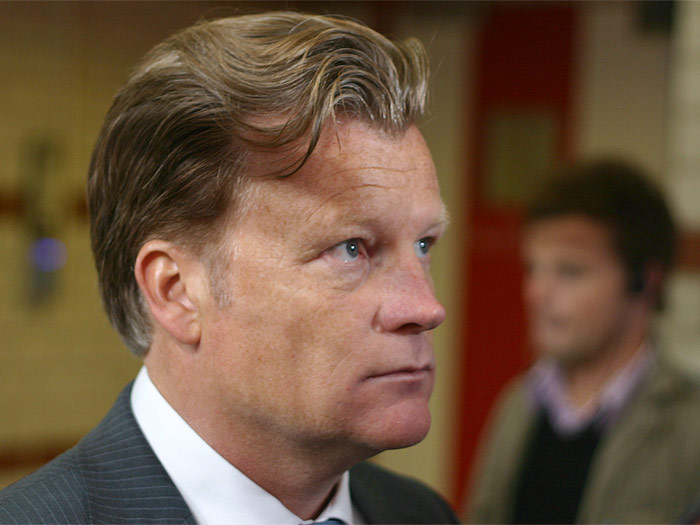
- Wotte in 2007

Personal information
- Full name: Mark Christian Wotte
- Date of birth: 16 December 1960 (age 65)
- Place of birth: Enschede, Netherlands
- Position: Defender

Youth career
- Sportclub Enschede
- FC Twente

Senior career*
Years	Team	Apps	(Gls)
1980–1981	FC Vlaardingen	33	(4)
1981–1982	Feyenoord	4	(0)
1982–1983	FC Den Haag	32	(1)
1983–1986	SVV	69	(3)
Total		138	(8)

Managerial career
- 1983–1988: VV Rijswijk
- 1992: ADO Den Haag
- 1994–1996: FC Lisse
- 1996–1998: ADO Den Haag
- 1998–2000: Utrecht
- 2000–2000: Den Bosch
- 2000–2002: Netherlands U19+U-21
- 2002–2004: Willem II Tilburg
- 2006: Ismaily
- 2006–2007: RKC Waalwijk
- 2007–2008: Al Ahli
- 2009: Southampton
- 2010: Universitatea Craiova
- 2010–2011: Ismaily
- 2011–2014: Scottish FA (performance director)
- 2015–2020: Moroccan FA (under-23 coach)
- 2020: Al Wahda
- 2022–2023: Syria U23
- * Club domestic league appearances and goals

Mark Christian Wotte (born 16 December 1960) is a Dutch football manager and former player. Wotte has managed teams in the Netherlands, Egypt, Qatar, England and Romania, and has also worked for the Scottish Football Association.

== Playing career ==
Wotte played for Sportclub Enschede and FC Twente Academy, The Netherlands U.17's, and 1st Team Football for Feyenoord, FC Vlaardingen, FC Den Haag and SVV in his native Netherlands. Injuries ended his career in 1986.

== Coaching and managerial career ==
In 1996, Wotte was named manager of ADO Den Haag, where he stayed for two seasons, before signing for Utrecht (1997–2000). He later worked for Den Bosch, Willem II, the Royal Dutch Football Association, Feyenoord (technical director), and Ismaily in Egypt. He left Ismaily on 16 December 2006 due to family reasons, to return to the Netherlands to coach RKC Waalwijk before moving to Qatar to manage Al Ahli.

=== Southampton ===
Having initially been linked with Southampton in 2005, Wotte joined the club as part of the new management team in 2008, with particular responsibility for the development of Southampton's youth squad. He was appointed manager on 23 January 2009, replacing Jan Poortvliet. Southampton drew 2–2 against Norwich City in his first game in charge.

Defeats against Sheffield United and Bristol City left the Saints in relegation trouble. Wins against Preston North End, Cardiff City and Ipswich Town gave Southampton hope, but the club went into administration, due to financial problems. Unable to steer them to safety, Southampton were relegated to League One, where they would start with the 10 point deduction at the start of the following season. Wotte left the club after it was taken over by Markus Liebherr in the summer of 2009.

=== Universitatea Craiova ===
Wotte signed a one-and-a-half-year contract with Romania's Liga I team Universitatea Craiova on 7 January 2010. He led the team on a good run, which contained victories against Rapid București, Vaslui, Poli Iași, Brașov and Astra Ploiești. However, after losing two home games, he was suspended on 10 May 2010 for 30 days, despite saving the team from relegation, being four points clear above the relegation zone. Following the suspension, Wotte got in a conflict with the Craiova's owner and left the club. In 2015 the CAS of FIFA decided the dismissal was injustice.

=== Ismaily ===
Wotte returned to Egyptian club Ismaily in June 2010. He coached his first competitive game on 18 July, in a game against Algerian side JS Kabylie in the 2010 CAF Champions League. After the public uproar in Egypt early 2011 causing temporarily postponing of The Egyptian League Wotte stayed until April managing the team before returning to the Netherlands.

=== Scottish FA ===
Wotte was named as the first Performance Director and Technical Director of National Teams of the Scottish Football Association (SFA) on 23 June 2011. Wotte left the SFA in October 2014, having implemented most of the recommendations of a review conducted by Henry McLeish.

=== Morocco FA ===
On 1 December 2015, Wotte joined the Royal Moroccan Football Federation. He worked as the football federation's National Youth Teams Coach. He signed a four-year contract until 2020. He was responsible for players born 1997-1998 and 1999 with teams U20 and the Olympic Team U23.

In July 2017, he won for the first time since 2001 the football tournament at the 2017 Francophone Games in Abidjan by beating the home country CIV in the Final with the Morocco U20 team. In 2018 he won also gold medals with Morocco U15/16 in Algeria and Tunesia.

=== Al Wahda ===
In July 2020, Wotte signed a contract with Abu Dhabi side, Al Wahda, however due to the UAEFA postponing the Pro-League competition and after one training match, he was dismissed in September of the same year.
