= Arie Romijn =

Dutch footballer and coach

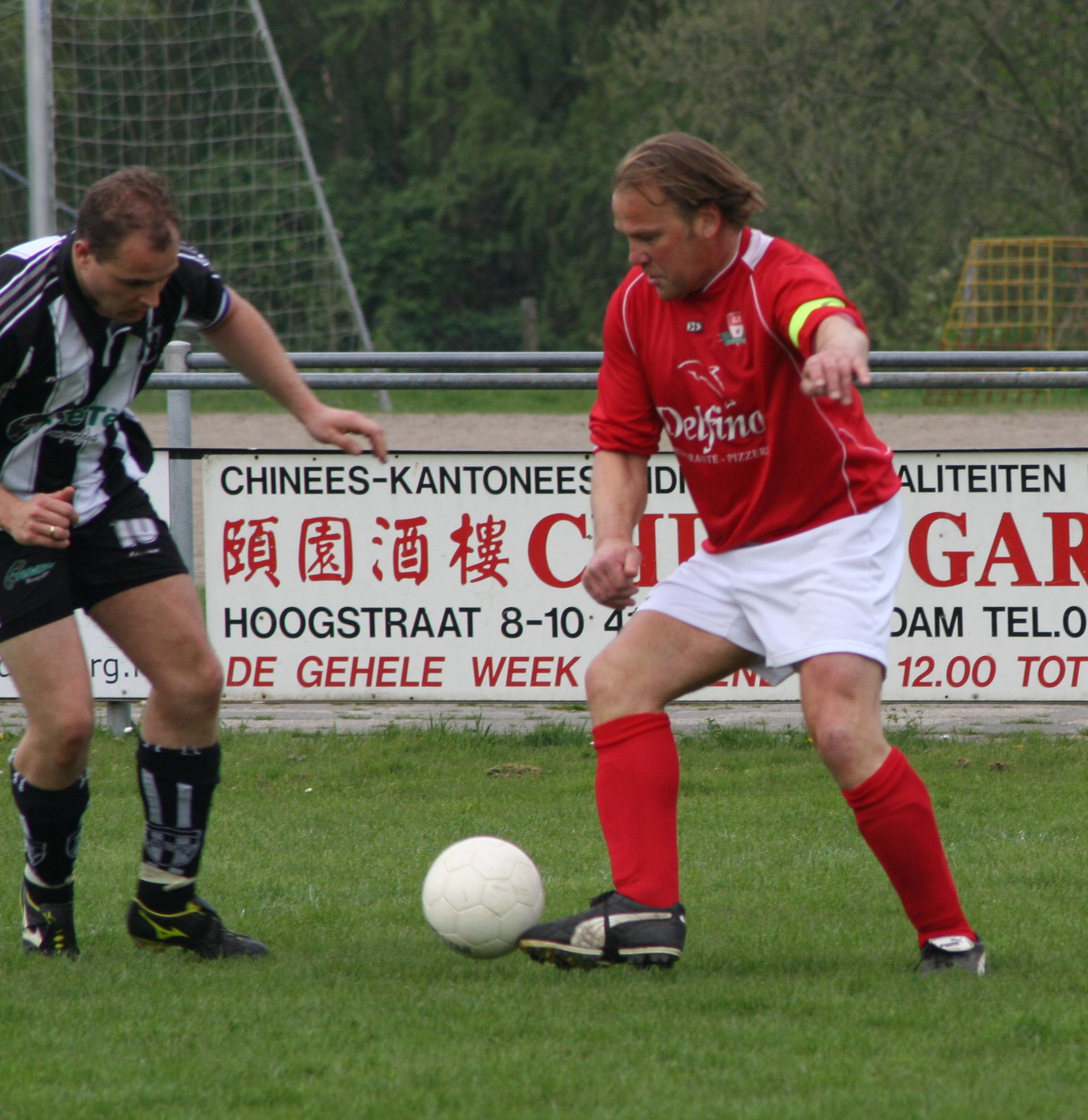
- Arie Romijn (right) in 2011, playing for GJS

Personal information
- Place of birth: Gorinchem, Netherlands

Arie Romijn (born 4 December 1958 in Gorinchem, Netherlands) is a former Dutch professional footballer, and a coach of amateur soccer squads. His position was forward.

== Football career ==
Romijn played in the youth of SVW Gorinchem, where his father was a forward before him. He also played one year in GVV Unitas, went back and made it into SVW's first squad at the age of 15. He was then scouted by Feyenoord.

In 1978 Romijn made his debut in Feyenoord's first squad and continued the season on loan in FC Groningen. He transferred to FC Den Bosch, for which, during three years, he was the club's top scorer. Next came SBV Vitesse, a second run at FC Den Bosch, and RBC Roosendaal. Before RBC and after his professional career, Romijn played for SVW Gorinchem, GVV Unitas, and finally in GJS Gorinchem until 2014 (by then already in the 5th squad).

Romijn managed DVV Fluks (1988–1990), VV Sliedrecht (1990–1993), SVW Gorinchem (1993–1994), VV Papendrecht (1994–1997), ASWH (1997–1998), and GJS Gorinchem (1998–1999).

Season	Club	League	Caps	Goals
1978/79	(Netherlands) Feyenoord	Eredivisie	1	0
1978/79	(Netherlands) FC Groningen (loan)	Eerste Divisie	30	3
1979/80	(Netherlands) FC Den Bosch	Eerste Divisie	35	16
1980/81	(Netherlands) FC Den Bosch	Eerste Divisie	30	10
1981/82	(Netherlands) FC Den Bosch	Eerste Divisie	34	17
1982/83	(Netherlands) SBV Vitesse (loan)	Eerste Divisie	22	7
1983/84	(Netherlands) FC Den Bosch	Eredivisie	11	3
1984/85	(Netherlands) SVW Gorinchem	Tweede Klasse		
1985/86	(Netherlands) RBC Roosendaal	Eerste Divisie	25	3
1986/87	(Netherlands) GVV Unitas	Hoofdklasse		
1987/88	(Netherlands) GVV Unitas	Eerste Klasse		
1988/89	(Netherlands) GVV Unitas	Hoofdklasse		
