= Najima =

Najima is the feminine version of the Arabic name Najim. It may refer to:

== Given name ==
- Najima Rhozali (born 1960), Moroccan politician

== Places ==
- Najima Castle, a hilltop castle in Fukuoka City, Fukuoka Prefecture, Japan
- Najima Station, a railway station in Higashi-ku, Fukuoka, Japan
- Najafabad, Zarandieh, a village in Hakimabad Rural District, Zarandieh County, Markazi Province, Iran

== See also ==
- Najma (disambiguation)
- Najim (disambiguation)
