= Sawt El Ghad =

Radio station in Lebanon

Sawt el-Ghad (Arabic: صوت الغد) is a Lebanese radio station established in September 1997, that is affiliated with the Free Patriotic Movement, broadcasting entertainment and informative programs in Lebanon, Syria, Jordan, Bahrain and Australia, Canada and the US. It offers educational and informative programs, with Alain Jeday, Rima Njeim and Dj Fox among the RJ’s.

The Free Patriotic Movement also runs another radio station Sawt El Mada, which is specialized in news broadcasting.

== Background ==
Founded in 1997, it extended its distribution to Syria in 1999, on the internet in 2000, and to Jordan in 2005. Since 2006, the station has been run and funded by the Free Patriotic Movement .

Former Minister Suleiman Franjieh is the station's majority shareholder, and the owner of the station is Wadih Abou Jawde (وديع أبو جودة).

== Frequencies ==
- Lebanon: 96.7 MHz & 97.1 MHz
- Syria: 99.9 MHz
- Jordan: 101.5 MHz
- Australia: 1620 AM
- Bahrain: 94.8 MHz
