= Jan Remmers =

Dutch football coach (1922–2013)

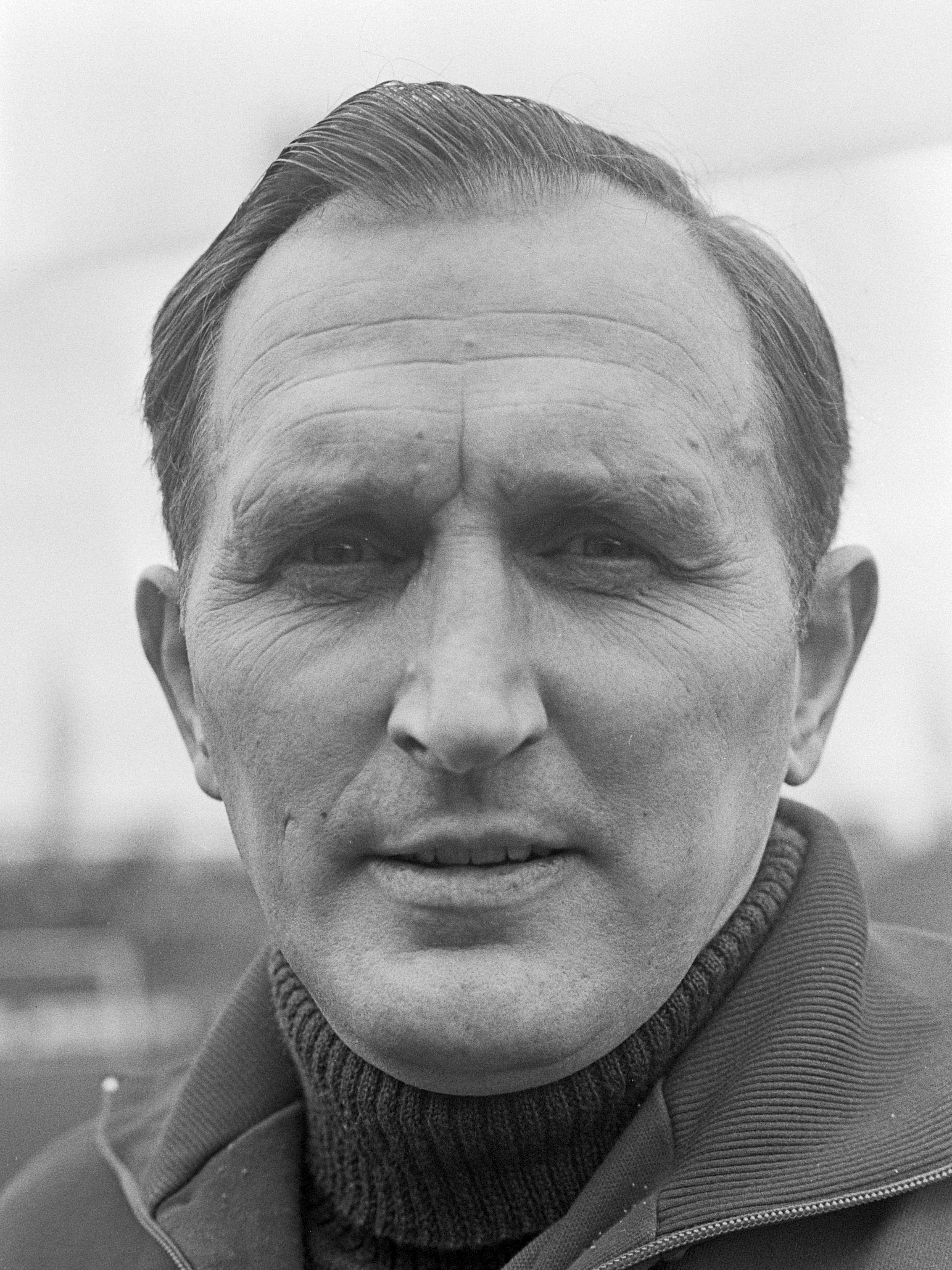
- Remmers in 1971

Personal information
- Full name: Johannes Antonius Josephus Remmers
- Date of birth: 30 September 1922
- Place of birth: 's-Hertogenbosch, Netherlands
- Date of death: 3 April 2013 (aged 90)
- Place of death: 's-Hertogenbosch, Netherlands
- Position: Defender

Senior career*
Years	Team	Apps	(Gls)
–1958	BVV		

Managerial career
- 1960–1961: VV Baronie
- 1961–1970: N.E.C. Nijmegen
- 1970–1974: FC Den Bosch
- 1974–1980: RKC Waalwijk
- 1980–1981: VV Geldrop
- * Club domestic league appearances and goals

Jan Remmers (30 September 1922 – 3 April 2013) was a Dutch football coach and former player. He coached N.E.C. Nijmegen, FC Den Bosch and RKC Waalwijk, among others.

== Career ==
Remmers played as a right-half for BVV until 1958, appearing in the Eredivisie and in international competitions. In the 1947–48 season, he won the national championship with the club.

Remmers worked for N.E.C. Nijmegen for nine years, from 1961 to 1970. In 1964, N.E.C. won the Dutch third division. Three years later, in the 1966–67 season, N.E.C. won promotion to the Eredivisie. In 1969 they participated in the Intertoto Cup.

Remmers then coached FC Den Bosch from 1970 to 1974 and RKC Waalwijk. Den Bosch won the Eerste Divisie in the 1970–71 season, and promoted to the Eredivisie.

== Death ==
Remmers died on 3 April 2013, at the age of 90.
