= René van Eck =

Dutch footballer and manager

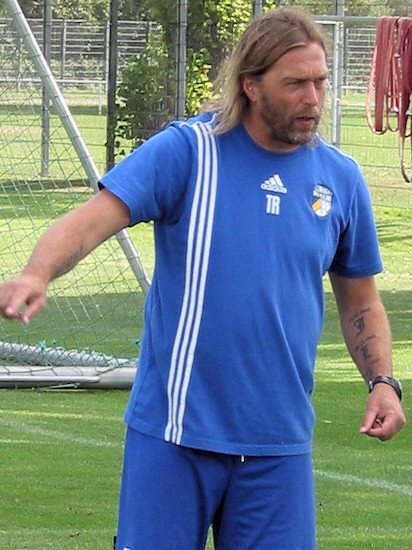
- Van Eck training Carl Zeiss Jena in 2009

Personal information
- Date of birth: 18 February 1966 (age 60)
- Place of birth: Rotterdam, Netherlands
- Height: 1.84 m (6 ft 0 in)
- Position: Defender

Team information
- Current team: Dordrecht (asst manager)

Youth career
- 1984–1988: Excelsior

Senior career*
| Years | Team | Apps | (Gls) |
| 1983–1986 | Excelsior | 50 | (0) |
| 1986–1990 | FC Den Bosch | 127 | (1) |
| 1990–1998 | Luzern | 240 | (6) |
| 1998–2000 | FC Nürnberg | 38 | (0) |
| 2000–2001 | Winterthur | 21 | (1) |
| 2001–2002 | Kriens | 31 | (0) |
| Total | | 507 | (8) |

Managerial career
- 2002–2003: Luzern (assistant)
- 2003–2006: Luzern
- 2006: Inter Turku
- 2006–2007: FC Wohlen
- 2007–2008: FC Thun
- 2008–2009: Carl Zeiss Jena
- 2009–2010: Carl Zeiss Jena
- 2010–2012: FC Nürnberg (U19)
- 2012–2013: Alemannia Aachen
- 2014–2015: Excelsior (U19)
- 2015–2016: FC Den Bosch
- 2016: FC Muri
- 2017: Wacker Nordhausen
- 2017: FC Muri
- 2017–2018: FC Zürich (U16)
- 2018–2019: FC Zürich (assistant)
- 2020: Feyenoord (academy)
- 2020–2021: Grasshoppers (U18)
- 2021: Feyenoord (U18)
- 2021–2022: SC Kriens
- 2022: Deinze (assistant)
- 2023: Capelle
- 2023: FC Cosmos Koblenz
- 2024-2025: Capelle
- 2025-: Dordrecht (asst.)
- * Club domestic league appearances and goals

René van Eck (born 18 February 1966) is a Dutch retired footballer and current assistant to manager Dirk Kuyt at FC Dordrecht.

== Playing career ==
=== Club ===
Van Eck started his professional career at local side Excelsior Rotterdam before moving to FC Den Bosch aged 20. The long-haired defender played four seasons at Den Bosch, then moved abroad to join FC Luzern where he would spend eight seasons and become captain of the team.

He was a hard and physical defender, moving in December 1998 from FC Luzern to 1. FC Nürnberg. He played with Nürnberg sixteen games the Bundesliga. After Nürnberg's relegation he played one season in the 2. Bundesliga with 22 games. Afterwards, Van Eck moved back to Switzerland and signed a contract with FC Winterthur. After half a year he moved to league rival SC Kriens.

== Coaching career ==
His coaching career began for Van Eck as assistant manager of FC Luzern; in 2003 he was named as the new manager. His greatest success was the promotion to the Swiss Super League, among others with 31 games without defeat. Differences with the club management led him to leave Luzern and joining the Finnish club Inter Turku. With this club he stayed in the league. From June 2007 to May 2008 he managed FC Thun and was relegated from the AXPO Super League to the Challenge League, and on 23 May 2008 fired in Thun.

Since 2007, van Eck holds the UEFA Pro Coach Licence. He signed a coaching contract with FC Carl Zeiss Jena on 28 September 2008, until the end of the season, then on 5 February 2009 extended his contract to 30 June 2011. He was fired from his coaching job with Carl Zeiss Jena on 24 March 2009. On 29 May 2009, it was announced that he would return to Carl Zeiss Jena because his not cancelled contract ran until 30 June 2011. Later he was named as the new head coach of Carl Zeiss Jena, returning after 67 days. On 1 June 2010, he canceled his contract with Carl Zeiss Jena and left the club. During his time at Carl Zeiss Jena, "players were asked to toughen up by learning fighting techniques."

On 5 February 2015, FC Den Bosch announced that Rene van Eck would lead the first team for the rest of the 2014–15 season. This would have Rene van Eck returning in the Vliert after 24 years. He was removed from his job as a manager on 6 February 2016, after the 3–2 loss in the cup at home against VVSB.

He returned to Switzerland to take the reins at FC Muri in May 2016 and took over again in April 2017 after a spell at German side Wacker Nordhausen. Unable to save them from relegation to the 2. Liga Interregional, he left the club again at the end of the season and was instead appointed manager of FC Zürich's U16s. On 21 February 2018, Van Eck was promoted to the first team staff as assistant coach of newly hired manager Ludovic Magnin. At the end of May 2019, Van Eck announced his departure from Zürich.

In the first half of 2020, Van Eck worked at the academy of Feyenoord, before returning to Switzerland ahead of the 2020-21 season, where he was appointed U-18 manager of Grasshopper Club Zürich. However, he returned to Feyenoord in August 2021, in a similar position as at Grasshoppers. Van Eck was at Feyenoord for a few months, before being appointed manager of SC Kriens in November 2021. In April 2022, the club confirmed that Van Eck would leave the club at the end of the season. He ended the season at Kriens with 20 defeats, 1 draw and only 2 victories.

Ahead of the 2020-21 season, Van Eck was appointed assistant coach of Takahisa Shiraishi at K.M.S.K. Deinze in Belgium. From January 2023, until the end of the season, Van Eck was in charge of VV Capelle. Ahed of the 2023-24 season, he took the reins at German club FC Cosmos Koblenz.

== Personal life ==
His brother Jos also played professional football in the Netherlands.
