= 2018–19 Tweede Divisie =

Tweede Divisie
- Season: 2018–19
- Champions: AFC
- Promoted: No team promoted.
- Relegated: Jong Almere City; Barendrecht; FC Lienden; VVSB

The 2018–19 Tweede Divisie season is the third edition of the Dutch third tier since on hiatus from 1970-71 season and the 18th edition using Tweede Divisie name. Thirteen teams competed from the last season along with one relegated team from the Eerste Divisie and four promoted teams from the Derde Divisie.

At an extraordinary KNVB federation meeting on 2 October 2017, representatives of the amateur and professional football reached an agreement about the route to be taken to renew the football pyramid. Part of this agreement was that no promotion/relegation will take place between the Eerste and Tweede Divisie for the current season.

At another extraordinary KNVB federation meeting on 7 June 2018, an agreement was reached about the number of reserves teams allowed in each division as of season 2019–20. For the Tweede Divisie it will be 2 teams. Since there are currently 3 reserve teams (Jong Almere, Jong Sparta and Jong Vitesse) in the Tweede Divisie, the reserve team which ends lowest of the three will relegate to the Derde Divisie. In case a reserve team becomes champion in one of the Derde Divisies, the second best reserve team in the Tweede divisie will relegate as well.

On 18 December 2018 FC Lienden withdrew from the competition due to financial difficulties. On 6 January 2019 FC Lienden succeeded in making a restart with the help of their manager Hans van de Haar. The club found a new sponsor and will start working together with two football academies to complement the first team for the second half of the season.

== Teams ==
Location of teams in the Tweede Divisie 2018-19

Club	City	2017–18 season
AFC	Amsterdam	12th
Barendrecht	Barendrecht	4th
Excelsior Maassluis	Maassluis	7th
GVVV	Veenendaal	6th
HHC Hardenberg	Hardenberg	3rd
Koninklijke HFC	Haarlem	10th
IJsselmeervogels	Spakenburg	9th
Jong Almere City	Almere	(D3) Promotion playoff winner
Jong Sparta	Rotterdam	11th
Jong Vitesse	Arnhem	(D3) Sun, 1st
Katwijk	Katwijk	1st
Kozakken Boys	Werkendam	2nd
Lienden	Lienden	14th
Rijnsburgse Boys	Rijnsburg	5th
Scheveningen	Scheveningen	(D3) Promotion playoff winner
SV Spakenburg	Spakenburg	(D3) Sat, 1st
De Treffers	Groesbeek	13th
VVSB	Noordwijkerhout	8th

== Standings ==
Pos	Team	Pld	W	D	L	GF	GA	GD	Pts	Promotion, qualification or relegation
1	AFC (C)	34	22	5	7	85	43	+42	71	Champion
2	Excelsior Maassluis	34	19	6	9	69	38	+31	63	
3	IJsselmeervogels	34	19	6	9	70	52	+18	63	
4	Koninklijke HFC	34	18	7	9	62	37	+25	61	
5	Katwijk	34	15	10	9	51	39	+12	55	
6	HHC Hardenberg	34	16	6	12	68	54	+14	54	
7	Kozakken Boys	34	16	6	12	59	49	+10	54	
8	Jong Vitesse	34	15	8	11	62	46	+16	53	
9	SV Spakenburg	34	16	4	14	55	52	+3	52	
10	GVVV	34	14	7	13	61	64	−3	49	
11	De Treffers	34	14	6	14	47	48	−1	48	
12	Jong Sparta	34	13	8	13	59	54	+5	47	
13	Rijnsburgse Boys	34	14	5	15	77	79	−2	47	
14	Scheveningen	34	12	7	15	59	65	−6	43	
15	VVSB (R)	34	8	6	20	57	82	−25	30	Qualification to relegation play-offs
16	Jong Almere City (R)	34	8	4	22	46	69	−23	28	Relegation to Derde Divisie
17	Lienden (R)	34	7	5	22	42	95	−53	26	Qualification to relegation play-offs
18	Barendrecht (R)	34	5	4	25	29	92	−63	19	Relegation to Derde Divisie

Updated to match(es) played on 25 May 2019. Source: Soccerway
Rules for classification: 1) points; 2) goal difference; 3) number of goals scored
(C) Champions; (R) Relegated

== Attendances ==
#	Club	Average
1	IJsselmeervogels	1,829
2	Spakenburg	1,710
3	Katwijk	1,196
4	Rijnsburgse Boys	1,171
5	HHC	1,000
6	GVVV	986
7	Kozakken Boys	871
8	VVSB	853
9	De Treffers	693
10	SVV	679
11	Excelsior Maassluis	674
12	Barendrecht	490
13	HFC	476
14	AFC	471
15	Lienden	460
16	Jong Vitesse	271
17	Jong Sparta	192
18	Jong Almere City	186
