= Fares D. Noujaim =

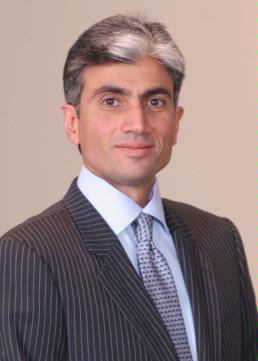
- Noujaim in January 2008 at Guggenheim Partners
- Education: Pace University
- Occupation: Investment Banker
- Spouse: Mirna Noujaim

Fares Noujaim (Arabic: فارس نجيم) is a Lebanese-American banker who joined Guggenheim Partners in September 2014. He was appointed Co-Chairman of Guggenheim Securities, the investment banking and capital markets division of Guggenheim Partners in 2024. Previously, Noujaim was Executive Vice Chairman of Global Corporate & Investment Banking at Bank of America Merrill Lynch.

Noujaim was also a member of the Global Corporate & Investment Banking Leadership team and had served as Global Head of Sovereign Wealth Funds, after previously serving as President of Merrill Lynch Middle East & North Africa.

== Career ==
Prior to joining Merrill Lynch in June 2008, Noujaim was vice chairman of the board of directors of Bear, Stearns & Co. Inc. and was a member of Bear Stearns' President's Advisory Committee, having previously served as the committee's chairman. While at Bear Stearns, Noujaim led banking teams providing capital markets and strategic advisory services to key domestic and international investment banking clients, including a broad range of global corporate enterprises and sovereign governments. He was Global Head of the firm's Capital Markets Group from 1992 to 1997.

In 2008, he was appointed as the president for Merrill Lynch's Middle East and North Africa subsidiary, a position that was created specifically for him and resided in Dubai for two years.

Over the course of his career, Noujaim has advised on announced M&A transactions in excess of $1 trillion and has facilitated financings totaling in approximately $1 trillion. Noujaim began his career with Goldman Sachs in 1985 and has served on the board of International College as well as The National Council of Economic Education.
