= 2002–03 Sparta Rotterdam season =

Sparta Rotterdam
2002–03 season
- Manager: Dolf Roks; Chris Dekker
- Eerste Divisie: 8th
- KNVB Cup: Second round
- Top goalscorer: League: Danny Koevermans (25); All: Danny Koevermans (27)
- Average home league attendance: 4,218
Home colours	Away colours

The 2002–03 Sparta Rotterdam season was the first football) year in which the in 1888 formed club from Rotterdam had to play in the Eerste Divisie. In the previous season, the team had been relegated for the first time in history by ending up in 17th place in the Eredivisie, and fourth in the play-offs for promotion and relegation ("nacompetitie").

Manager Dolf Roks was the successor of Frank Rijkaard. During the winter break he was fired, on 22 January 2003, and replaced by Chris Dekker, who assumed office on 7 February 2003.

== Matches ==
Win Tie Loss

=== Eerste Divisie ===
2002-08-16	FC Emmen	3–0	Sparta	Emmen
	De Groot 30'; De Vries 84'; Oosting 90'			Stadium: Univé Stadion; Attendance: 5,118; Referee: Sterk

2002-08-30	FC Volendam	3–2	Sparta	Volendam
	Buys 41'; Ouhsaine 75'; Henar 86'		Koevermans 7', 45'	Stadium: Kras Stadion; Attendance: 2,145; Referee: Van Dongen

2002-09-08	Sparta	4–0	Fortuna Sittard	Rotterdam
	Mendes da Silva 16', 34'; Conteh 59'; Koevermans 65'			Stadium: Het Kasteel; Attendance: 4,518; Referee: Van Egmond

2002-09-13	Sparta	1–0	MVV Maastricht	Rotterdam
	Van den Bergh 17'			Stadium: Het Kasteel; Attendance: 4,235; Referee: Van Beek

2002-09-20	ADO Den Haag	3–1	Sparta	The Hague
	Stroeve 39', 50'; Van der Laan 78' (pen.)		Koevermans 87'	Stadium: Zuiderpark; Attendance: 5,421; Referee: Koopman

2002-09-27	Sparta	1–1	Go Ahead Eagles	Rotterdam
	Van den Bergh 24'		Dibi 77' (pen.)	Stadium: Het Kasteel; Attendance: 4,678; Referee: Schenkels

2002-10-04	Sparta	5–2	BV Veendam	Rotterdam
	Conteh 2', 33'; Koevermans 28', 45'; Van den Bergh 86'		Weerman 4', 55'	Stadium: Het Kasteel; Attendance: 4,043; Referee: Buiting

2002-10-18	Telstar	1–4	Sparta	IJmuiden
	Tol 65'		Conteh 53', 55'; Koevermans 60', 90'	Stadium: Sportpark Schoonenberg; Attendance: 1,810; Referee: Oskam

2002-10-25	HFC Haarlem	1–1	Sparta	Haarlem
	Ketting 76'		Koevermans 5' (pen.)	Stadium: Haarlem Stadion; Attendance: 1,637; Referee: Van Dongen

2002-11-01	Sparta	2–3	Heracles Almelo	Rotterdam
	Koevermans 8', 77'		Stegeman 49'; Sluijter 52'; Kocks 82'	Stadium: Het Kasteel; Attendance: 5,448; Referee: Van Dijk

2002-11-08	VVV-Venlo	2–4	Sparta	Venlo
	Jacobs 5'; Hofstede 58'		Koevermans 20'; Van den Bergh 52', 65', 84'	Stadium: De Koel; Attendance: 2,200; Referee: Van der Hilst

2002-11-15	Sparta	2–4	Cambuur	Rotterdam
	Conteh 41'; Koevermans 64' (pen.)		Lord 20', 40', 75'; Bruin 65'	Stadium: Het Kasteel; Attendance: 4,681; Referee: Wiedemeijer

2002-11-22	FC Den Bosch	2–1	Sparta	Den Bosch
	Jansen 45', 64'		Koevermans 65' (pen.)	Stadium: De Vliert; Attendance: 6,738; Referee: Vink

2002-11-29	Sparta	2–4	TOP Oss	Rotterdam
	Koevermans 3', 64'		Guijt 38', 42'; Dijkhuizen 45'; Onyeike 87'	Stadium: Het Kasteel; Attendance: 5,423; Referee: Koopman

2002-12-06	Sparta	0–5	Helmond Sport	Rotterdam
			Van Dijk 9', 80'; Hendriksen 22'; Heesakkers 27'; Aelbrecht 75'	Stadium: Het Kasteel; Attendance: 3,818; Referee: Smit

2002-12-13	FC Eindhoven	2–0	Sparta	Eindhoven
	Thijssens 8'; Van de Langenberg 90'			Stadium: Jan Louwers Stadion; Attendance: 1,946; Referee: Langkamp

2002-12-20	FC Dordrecht	0–0	Sparta	Dordrecht
				Stadium: GN Bouw Stadion; Attendance: 2,500; Referee: Haverkort

2003-02-04	Sparta	1–0	FC Emmen	Rotterdam
	Koevermans 21'			Stadium: Het Kasteel; Attendance: 3,352; Referee: Langkamp

2003-02-07	Fortuna Sittard	1–1	Sparta	Sittard
	Daemen 54'		Van Bueren 29'	Stadium: Wagner & Partners; Attendance: 3,515; Referee: Vink

2003-02-16	Sparta	1–2	ADO Den Haag	Rotterdam
			Stroeve 64'; Castelen 69'	Stadium: Het Kasteel; Attendance: 4,234; Referee: Wegereef

2003-02-21	MVV Maastricht	2–1	Sparta	Maastricht
	Liobardi 27'; Wau 61'		Koevermans 68'	Stadium: De Geusselt; Attendance: 2,100; Referee: Van der Hilst

2003-02-28	Sparta	0–4	FC Volendam	Rotterdam
			Faria 24', 39'; Ouhsaine 24'; Smit 90'	Stadium: Het Kasteel; Attendance: 4,000; Referee: Blom

2003-03-07	Go Ahead Eagles	1–2	Sparta	Deventer
	Leferink 89'		Van den Bergh 69', 84'	Stadium: De Adelaarshorst; Attendance: 3,900; Referee: Van Dongen

2003-03-14	BV Veendam	1–2	Sparta	Veendam
	Weerman 39'		Hosé 10', 64'	Stadium: De Langeleegte; Attendance: 3,250; Referee: Van Beek

2003-03-23	Sparta	1–1	Telstar	Rotterdam
	Hosé 28'		De Lange 39' (pen.)	Stadium: Het Kasteel; Attendance: 3,973; Referee: Schenkels

2003-04-06	Sparta	4–1	HFC Haarlem	Rotterdam
	Koevermans 70', 78', 86'; Bechan 90'		Tamerus 50'	Stadium: Het Kasteel; Attendance: 5,090; Referee: Olde Olthof

2003-04-11	Heracles Almelo	1–3	Sparta	Almelo
	Platvoet 54'		Hosé 2', 22'; Koevermans 46'	Stadium: Polman Stadion; Attendance: 5,500; Referee: Wiedemeijer

2003-04-18	Sparta	1–3	VVV-Venlo	Rotterdam
	De Fauw 28'		Van Galen 25'; Eberle 71'; Jacons 90'	Stadium: Het Kasteel; Attendance: 4,197; Referee: Kuipers

2003-04-25	Cambuur	1–1	Sparta	Leeuwarden
	Bischop 1'		Hosé 36'	Stadium: Cambuur Stadion; Attendance: 3,300; Referee: Luinge

2003-05-04	Sparta	3–4	FC Den Bosch	Rotterdam
	Koevermans 2', 87' (pen.); De Fauw 27'		Jansen 29', 32', 75', 78' (pen.)	Stadium: Het Kasteel; Attendance: 3,788; Referee: Koopman

2003-05-09	TOP Oss	1–2	Sparta	Oss
	Van den Berg 64'		Bechan 63'; Koevermans 69'	Stadium: TOP Oss Stadion; Attendance: 3,383; Referee: Vink

2003-05-16	Sparta	3–0	FC Dordrecht	Rotterdam
	Bechan 29'; Van Bueren 86'; Van den Bergh 62'			Stadium: Het Kasteel; Attendance: 3,880; Referee: Buiting

2003-05-23	Sparta	3–1	FC Eindhoven	Rotterdam
	Hosé 7'; Cicilia 36'; Sanou 85'		Jusić 32'	Stadium: Het Kasteel; Attendance: 2,361; Referee: Van Dongen

2003-05-30	Helmond Sport	2–1	Sparta	Helmond
	Van Dijk 25'; Heesakkers 25'		Cicilia 44'	Stadium: Stadion De Braak; Attendance: 3,295; Referee: Luijten

=== Amstel Cup ===
2002-08-10	HFC Haarlem	1–2	Sparta	Haarlem
	Supusepa		Bouchiba 43', 54'	Stadium: Haarlem Stadion; Attendance: 1,000; Referee: Wegereef

2002-08-20	Zwart Wit '28	1–3	Sparta	Rotterdam
	Brown 87'		Van den Bergh 7', 63' (pen.); Sanou 86'	Stadium: Sportpark De Vaan; Attendance: 600; Referee: Oskam

2002-08-27	TONEGIDO	0–3	Sparta	Voorburg
			Van den Bergh 54', 60'; Koevermans 82'	Stadium: Sportpark 't Loo; Attendance: 1,000; Referee: Vink

2002-11-05	RKSV Schijndel	2–3	Sparta	Schijndel
	Hastenberg 18'; Schaap 90'		Koevermans 3'; Van Kapel 61' (o.g.); Bouchiba 70'	Stadium: Zuideinderpark; Attendance: 750; Referee: Blom

2002-12-03	SBV Excelsior	4–2	Sparta	Rotterdam
	Lopes 16'; Mtiliga 64'; Boutahar 84'; El Hamdaoui 90'		Sanou 67'; Cicilia 89'	Stadium: Stadion Woudestein; Attendance: 3,158; Referee: Jol

== Players ==
No.	Pos	Nat	Player	Total		Eerste Divisie		Amstel Cup	
No.	Pos	Nat	Player	Apps	Goals	Apps	Goals	Apps	Goals
	GK	(Netherlands) NED	Frank Kooiman	23	0	18	0	5	0
	GK	(Netherlands) NED	Victor Kros	9	0	9	0	0	0
	GK	(Belgium) BEL	Brian Vandenbussche	8	0	8	0	0	0
	DF	(Netherlands) NED	Dwight Eli	24	0	21	0	3	0
	DF	(Belgium) BEL	Davy De Fauw	38	2	33	2	5	0
	DF	(Brazil) BRA	Marilia	7	0	5	0	2	0
	DF	(Netherlands) NED	Danny Schenkel	19	0	18	0	1	0
	DF	(Netherlands) NED	Jayson Trommel	29	0	24	0	5	0
	DF	(Netherlands) NED	Geoffrey Verweij	8	0	5	0	3	0
	DF	(Argentina) ARG	Juan Manuel Martínez	13	0	12	0	1	0
	DF	(Netherlands) NED	Martin van Leeuwen	30	0	26	0	4	0
	MF	(Netherlands) NED	Elbekay Bouchiba	13	3	10	0	3	3
	MF	(Netherlands) NED	Kiran Bechan	16	3	16	3	0	0
	MF	(Netherlands) NED	Edwin van Bueren	17	2	17	2	0	0
	MF	(Netherlands) NED	David Mendes da Silva	21	2	17	2	4	0
	MF	(Netherlands) NED	Lorenzo Rimkus	24	0	20	0	4	0
	MF	(Netherlands) NED	Ricky van den Bergh	28	13	24	9	4	4
	MF	(Morocco) MAR	Fouzi Mesaoudi	6	0	5	0	1	0
	MF	(Morocco) MAR	Omar Zaroual	2	0	2	0	0	0
	FW	(Netherlands) NED	Regi Blinker	10	0	8	0	2	0
	FW	(Netherlands Antilles) ANT	Kenneth Cicilia	23	3	19	2	4	1
	FW	(Denmark) DEN	Denni Conteh	14	6	13	6	1	0
	FW	(Netherlands) NED	Kwamé Cruden	1	0	0	0	1	0
	FW	(Netherlands) NED	Danny Koevermans	39	27	34	25	5	2
	FW	(Netherlands) NED	Rui Almeida Monteiro	30	0	28	0	2	0
	FW	(Burkina Faso) BFA	Ousmane Sanou	21	3	18	1	3	2
	FW	(Netherlands) NED	Brutil Hosé	16	8	16	8	0	0
	FW	(Netherlands) NED	Carlos Fortes	19	0	18	0	1	0

== See also ==
- 2002–03 in Dutch football
