= 2001–02 Sparta Rotterdam season =

Sparta Rotterdam
2001–02 season
- Chairman: (Netherlands) Charles van der Steene
- Manager: (Netherlands) Frank Rijkaard
- Eredivisie: 17th place
- Nacompetitie: Fourth place (→ relegated)
- KNVB Cup: First round
- Top goalscorer: League: (Morocco) Nourdin Boukhari (7) (Netherlands) Danny Koevermans (7); All: (Morocco) Nourdin Boukhari (12)
- Average home league attendance: 7,660
Home colours	Away colours

The 2001–2002 Sparta Rotterdam season was the football year in The Netherlands in which the club from Rotterdam was relegated for the first time in its history to the Eerste Divisie. The team had to play in the play-offs for promotion and relegation ("nacompetitie") after having finished in 17th place in the Eredivisie.

== Matches ==
Win Tie Loss

=== Eredivisie ===
2001-08-19	Feyenoord	5 – 0	Sparta	Rotterdam
	Tomasson 11', 87', 90'; Emerton 23'; Bosvelt 55'			Stadium: De Kuip; Attendance: 43,396; Referee: Bossen

2001-08-22	Sparta	3 – 1	FC Utrecht	Rotterdam
	Boukhari 30', 45', 89'		Tanghe 85'	Stadium: Het Kasteel; Attendance: 5,000; Referee: Braamhaar

2001-08-25	AZ Alkmaar	3 – 0	Sparta	Alkmaar
	Nelisse 3' (pen.); Huiberts 58', 72'			Stadium: Alkmaarderhout; Attendance: 6,057; Referee: Haverkort

2001-09-09	Sparta	0 – 0	RKC Waalwijk	Rotterdam
				Stadium: Het Kasteel; Attendance: 6,300; Referee: Oskam

2001-09-15	Vitesse	1 – 1	Sparta	Arnhem
	Kreek 21'		Koevermans 83'	Stadium: Gelredome; Attendance: 23,500; Referee: Temmink

2001-09-23	Ajax	3 – 0	Sparta	Amsterdam
	Van der Vaart 11'; Mido 17', 25'			Stadium: Amsterdam Arena; Attendance: 32,388; Referee: Van Dijk

2001-09-30	Sparta	1 – 1	FC Twente	Rotterdam
	Marbus 60'		Van der Laan 7'	Stadium: Het Kasteel; Attendance: 7,436; Referee: Schenkels

2001-10-07	Sparta	1 – 1	FC Den Bosch	Rotterdam
	Boukhari 90' (pen.)		Mghizrat 12'	Stadium: Het Kasteel; Attendance: 6,340; Referee: Vink

2001-10-13	Fortuna Sittard	3 – 4	Sparta	Sittard
	Gerritsen 9'; Cramb 26', 90'		Marbus 22'; Boukhari 55' (pen.); Koevermans 59'; Blinker 86'	Stadium: De Baandert; Attendance: 6,500; Referee: Van Egmond

2001-10-20	Sparta	0 – 3	Roda JC	Rotterdam
			Anastasiou 44', 81'; Soetaers 57'	Stadium: Het Kasteel; Attendance: 6,895; Referee: Haverkort

2001-10-30	Sparta	2 – 3	NAC Breda	Rotterdam
	Koevermans 45'; Zijm 90'		Stewart 13', 23'; Sergio 56'	Stadium: Het Kasteel; Attendance: 6,913; Referee: Braamhaar

2001-11-03	Sparta	2 – 1	PSV	Rotterdam
	Winter 17'; Koevermans 63'		Kežman 8'	Stadium: Het Kasteel; Attendance: 7,992; Referee: Van Dijk

2001-11-16	SC Heerenveen	3 – 0	Sparta	Heerenveen
	Zijm 31' (o.g.); Allbäck 42'; Denneboom 55'			Stadium: Abe Lenstra Stadion; Attendance: 14,200; Referee: Bossen

2001-11-24	De Graafschap	3 – 0	Sparta	Doetinchem
	Meerdink 11'; Van Vossen 70'; Valeev 88'			Stadium: De Vijverberg; Attendance: 11,000; Referee: Schenkels

2001-11-28	Sparta	3 – 2	Willem II	Rotterdam
	Koevermans 26', 48', 57'		Shoukov 8', 11'	Stadium: Het Kasteel; Attendance: 6,106; Referee: De Graaf

2001-12-02	Sparta	0 – 0	NEC	Rotterdam
				Stadium: Het Kasteel; Attendance: 9,000; Referee: Kooman

2001-12-09	FC Groningen	0 – 0	Sparta	Groningen
				Stadium: Oosterpark Stadion; Attendance: 12,550; Referee: Jol

2001-12-16	RKC Waalwijk	1 – 1	Sparta	Waalwijk
	Hoogendorp 58'		Boukhari 11'	Stadium: Mandemakers Stadion; Attendance: 6,550; Referee: Jol

2002-01-25	Sparta	1 – 4	SC Heerenveen	Rotterdam
	Van der Meer 74'		Marilia 7' (o.g.); De Nooijer 76'; Lurling 85'; Nurmela 89'	Stadium: Het Kasteel; Attendance: 8,286; Referee: Bossen

2002-02-01	NEC Nijmegen	1 – 1	Sparta	Nijmegen
	De Nooijer 65'		Mendes da Silva 33'	Stadium: De Goffert; Attendance: 9,500; Referee: Luinge

2002-02-06	NAC Breda	2 – 2	Sparta	Breda
	Bobson 12'; Salmon 71'		Sanou 34'; Conteh 90' (pen.)	Stadium: Fujifilm Stadion; Attendance: 11,589; Referee: Sterk

2002-02-09	Sparta	1 – 3	De Graafschap	Rotterdam
	Sanou 21'		Van Vossen 53', 73'; Smit 75'	Stadium: Het Kasteel; Attendance: 7,853; Referee: Vink

2002-02-15	FC Den Bosch	1 – 1	Sparta	Den Bosch
	Mghizrat 78'		Boukhari 37'	Stadium: ECCO Stadion; Attendance: 4,997; Referee: Koopman

2002-02-20	Sparta	0 – 4	AZ Alkmaar	Rotterdam
			Perez 3'; Huiberts 16'; Nelisse 51'; Wolters 87'	Stadium: Het Kasteel; Attendance: 7,481; Referee: Buiting

2002-03-03	Sparta	0 – 0	Fortuna Sittard	Rotterdam
				Stadium: Het Kasteel; Attendance: 8,103; Referee: Braamhaar

2002-03-08	FC Utrecht	4 – 2	Sparta	Utrecht
	Kuyt 25'; Marilia 26' (o.g.); Gluščević 65'; Nieuwenburg 73' (o.g.)		Vreven 26' (o.g.); Langerak 58'	Stadium: Stadion Galgenwaard; Attendance: 13,000; Referee: Temmink

2002-03-16	Willem II	4 – 0	Sparta	Tilburg
	Landzaat 2', 16' (pen.), 45' (pen.); Bombarda 7'			Stadium: Willem II Stadion; Attendance: 13,400; Referee: Haverkort

2002-03-24	Sparta	0 – 5	Feyenoord	Rotterdam
			Emerton 6'; Tomasson 17'; Van Hooijdonk 45'; Leonardo 49'; Bosvelt 63'	Stadium: Het Kasteel; Attendance: 10,570; Referee: Bossen

2002-03-30	Roda JC	3 – 0	Sparta	Kerkrade
	Kros 4' (o.g.); Vicelich 32'; Van Dessel 82'			Stadium: Parkstad Limburg; Attendance: 14,500; Referee: Wegereef

2002-04-05	FC Twente	2 – 0	Sparta	Enschede
	Cairo 12'; Van De Paar 45'			Stadium: Arke Stadion; Attendance: 13,250; Referee: Van Egmond

2002-04-14	Sparta	0 – 4	Ajax	Rotterdam
			Mido 33', 66', 73'; Zlatan Ibrahimović 78'	Stadium: Het Kasteel; Attendance: 9,427; Referee: Van Dijk

2002-04-20	Sparta	0 – 1	Vitesse	Rotterdam
			Sikora 16'	Stadium: Het Kasteel; Attendance: 7,926; Referee: Temmink

2002-04-28	PSV	3 – 0	Sparta	Eindhoven
	Vennegoor of Hesselink 30'; Van Bommel 45'; Ramzi 52'			Stadium: Philips Stadion; Attendance: 33,000; Referee: Braamhaar

2002-05-05	Sparta	0 – 0	FC Groningen	Rotterdam
				Stadium: Het Kasteel; Attendance: 7,164; Referee: Jol

=== Final Table ===
Position	Team	Points	Played	Won	Drawn	Lost	For	Against	Difference
1	Ajax Amsterdam	73	34	22	7	5	73	34	+39
2	PSV Eindhoven	68	34	20	8	6	77	32	+45
3	Feyenoord Rotterdam	64	34	19	7	8	68	29	+39
4	SC Heerenveen	60	34	17	9	8	57	27	+30
5	Vitesse Arnhem	60	34	16	12	6	45	34	+12
6	NAC Breda	54	34	15	9	10	55	52	+3
7	FC Utrecht	51	34	14	9	11	60	51	+9
8	RKC Waalwijk	48	34	14	6	14	49	44	+5
9	NEC Nijmegen	45	34	13	6	15	38	59	-21
10	AZ Alkmaar	43	34	12	7	15	43	45	-2
11	Willem II Tilburg	43	34	10	13	11	54	61	-7
12	FC Twente	42	34	10	12	12	41	41	0
13	Roda JC	41	34	11	8	15	33	45	-12
14	De Graafschap	37	34	10	7	17	43	55	-12
15	FC Groningen	37	34	10	7	17	40	59	-19
16	FC Den Bosch	33	34	8	9	17	40	55	-15
17	Sparta Rotterdam	24	34	4	12	18	26	75	-49
18	Fortuna Sittard	17	34	3	8	23	27	71	-44

=== Nacompetitie ===
2002-05-08	ADO Den Haag	3 – 3	Sparta	The Hague
	Hofstede 21', 37', 83'		Koevermans 20'; Marilia 40'; Boukhari 67'	Stadium: Zuiderpark; Attendance: 6,211; Referee: Luinge

2002-05-13	Sparta	1 – 0	Excelsior	Rotterdam
	Sanou 69'			Stadium: Het Kasteel; Attendance: 9,425; Referee: Van Egmond

2002-05-16	FC Volendam	1 – 3	Sparta	Volendam
	Rose 90'		Cicilia 52'; Koevermans 57'; Bartele 66' (o.g.)	Stadium: Kras Stadion; Attendance: 2,817; Referee: Van Hulten

2002-05-19	Sparta	1 – 3	FC Volendam	Rotterdam
	Boukhari 20' (pen.)		Buys 3', 79'; Fung a Wing 27'	Stadium: Het Kasteel; Attendance: 7,638; Referee: Jol

2002-05-22	Excelsior	2 – 1	Sparta	Rotterdam
	Olfers 3', 23'		Sanou 67'	Stadium: Stadion Woudestein; Attendance: 3,456; Referee: Bossen

2002-05-26	Sparta	1 – 3	ADO Den Haag	Rotterdam
	De Fauw 75'		Van Eijkeren 45'; Hofstede 48'; Petrov 52'	Stadium: Het Kasteel; Attendance: 4,820; Referee: Haverkort

=== Amstel Cup ===
2001-08-04	Sparta	3 – 1	FC Kranenburg	Rotterdam
	Koevermans 49'; Boukhari 57' (pen.); Langerak 90'		Van den Bergh 60'	Stadium: Het Kasteel; Attendance: 1,730; Referee: Bossen

2001-08-12	Scheveningen	0 – 4	Sparta	Scheveningen
			Boukhari 33' (pen.), 61'; Langerak 49', 73'	Stadium: Sportpark Houtrust; Attendance: 1,100; Referee: Langkamp

2001-08-15	Sparta	0 – 1	ADO Den Haag	Rotterdam
			Castelen 43'	Stadium: Het Kasteel; Attendance: 1,518; Referee: Van Egmond

2001-10-03	De Graafschap	2 – 1 [aet]	Sparta	Doetinchem
	Meerdink 17'; Schulp 102' (gg)		Marbus 30'	Stadium: De Vijverberg; Attendance: 5,000; Referee: Wegereef

== Players ==
No.	Pos	Nat	Player	Total		Eredivisie		Nacompetitie		Amstel Cup	
No.	Pos	Nat	Player	Apps	Goals	Apps	Goals	Apps	Goals	Apps	Goals
	GK	(Netherlands) NED	Frank Kooiman	36	0	26	0	6	0	4	0
	GK	(Netherlands) NED	Victor Kros	8	0	7	0	1	0	0	0
	GK	(Belgium) BEL	Brian Vandenbussche	4	0	4	0	0	0	0	0
	DF	(Morocco) MAR	Houssin Bezzai	12	0	9	0	0	0	3	0
	DF	(Netherlands) NED	Maurits van Dalen	0	0	0	0	0	0	0	0
	DF	(Netherlands) NED	Dwight Eli	8	0	2	0	6	0	0	0
	DF	(Netherlands) NED	Richard Elzinga	13	0	9	0	0	0	4	0
	DF	(Belgium) BEL	Davy De Fauw	13	1	7	0	6	1	0	0
	DF	(Netherlands) NED	Steve Goossen	29	0	23	0	4	0	2	0
	DF	(Brazil) BRA	Marilia	19	1	14	0	5	1	0	0
	DF	(Netherlands) NED	Dave van der Meer	32	1	27	1	3	0	2	0
	DF	(Netherlands) NED	Romeo Pengel	1	0	1	0	0	0	0	0
	DF	(Netherlands) NED	Tom Sier	8	0	6	0	0	0	2	0
	DF	(Netherlands) NED	Jayson Trommel	17	0	12	0	4	0	1	0
	MF	(Netherlands) NED	Elbekay Bouchiba	38	0	29	0	6	0	3	0
	MF	(Netherlands) NED	Silvan Inia	12	0	11	0	0	0	1	0
	MF	(Netherlands) NED	Michel Langerak	26	4	20	1	2	0	4	3
	MF	(Netherlands) NED	David Mendes da Silva	36	1	27	1	6	0	3	0
	MF	(Denmark) DEN	Anders Nielsen	20	0	17	0	0	0	3	0
	MF	(Netherlands) NED	John Nieuwenburg	8	0	8	0	0	0	0	0
	MF	(Netherlands) NED	Lorenzo Rimkus	8	0	5	0	3	0	0	0
	MF	(Netherlands) NED	Aron Winter	40	1	32	1	4	0	4	0
	MF	(Netherlands) NED	Sieme Zijm	33	1	29	1	1	0	3	0
	FW	(Netherlands) NED	Regi Blinker	28	1	22	1	2	0	4	0
	FW	(Morocco) MAR	Nourdin Boukhari	37	12	28	7	5	2	4	3
	FW	(Netherlands Antilles) ANT	Kenneth Cicilia	5	1	2	0	3	1	0	0
	FW	(Denmark) DEN	Denni Conteh	14	1	13	1	1	0	0	0
	FW	(Netherlands) NED	Danny Koevermans	31	10	23	7	6	2	2	1
	FW	(Netherlands) NED	Bram Marbus	20	3	17	2	0	0	3	1
	FW	(Netherlands) NED	Murat Mazlum	1	0	1	0	0	0	0	0
	FW	(Netherlands) NED	Rui Almeida Monteiro	2	0	2	0	0	0	0	0
	FW	(Burkina Faso) BFA	Ousmane Sanou	22	4	16	2	6	2	0	0

== See also ==
- 2001–02 in Dutch football
