= Ali Elkhattabi =

Dutch-Moroccan footballer

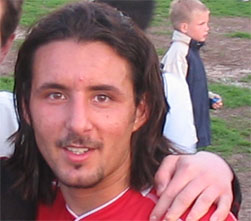
- Elkhattabi with AZ in 2005

Personal information
- Date of birth: 17 January 1977 (age 49)
- Place of birth: Schiedam, Netherlands
- Height: 1.70 m (5 ft 7 in)
- Position: Striker

Youth career
- 1985–1988: vv SVDPW
- 1988–1990: SVV
- 1990–1995: Sparta

Senior career*
Years	Team	Apps	(Gls)
1995–1996	Sparta	9	(1)
1996–1998	Heerenveen	41	(12)
1999–2001	Sparta	75	(36)
2001–2005	AZ	94	(31)
2005–2006	→ RBC (loan)	19	(1)
Total		238	(81)

International career
1997–2005	Morocco	10	(1)
- * Club domestic league appearances and goals

Ali Elkhattabi (Arabic: علي الخطّابي; born 17 January 1977) is a former professional footballer. Born in the Netherlands, Elkhattabi gained 10 caps for Morocco, making his debut in 1997.

== Club career ==
Elkhattabi began his professional career in the 1995–96 season with Sparta Rotterdam. After one season, he moved to Heerenveen. He proved to be an efficient goalscorer in his first matches at the club, spawning interest from several top clubs in the Netherlands. Three years later, Elkhattabi would, however, return to Sparta, where he scored 36 goals in 75 matches, striking up a partnership in attack with Bram Marbus. His final season – 2000–01 – proved his most successful, finishing second in the Eredivisie Golden Boot with 21 goals in 33 appearances, only behind Mateja Kežman. He was then signed by AZ. He stayed there for four years, before joining RBC Roosendaal on loan in 2005 after being rumored to Braga, Stoke City and Leeds United. Elkhattabi retired in September 2006, as he was not able to find a new club after his loan with RBC had expired.

Elkhattabi has a fear of flying, a condition which severely limited his ability to play in away matches in European competitions and to travel with the national team.

== International career ==
His international debut came against Togo in November 1997, and he was included in Morocco's 1998 World Cup squad.

== Retirement ==
Elkhattabi has worked as a real estate agent since his retirement from football. He has since also worked as a players' agent.
