= Sieme Zijm =

Dutch footballer

Personal information
- Full name: Sieme Peder Zijm
- Date of birth: January 25, 1978 (age 48)
- Place of birth: Den Helder, Netherlands
- Height: 1.86 m (6 ft 1 in)
- Positions: Left back; midfielder

Team information
- Current team: Feyenoord (youth coach)

Youth career
- ZDH
- HRC Den Helder
- Texelse Boys

Senior career*
Years	Team	Apps	(Gls)
1995–1998	AZ	10	(1)
1997–1999	FC Zwolle	32	(4)
1999–2002	Sparta	79	(4)
2002–2005	Go Ahead Eagles	93	(3)
2005–2007	Excelsior	70	(0)
2007–2008	Dordrecht	11	(0)
2008–2009	Emmen	23	(0)

Managerial career
- 2019-2020: Westlandia
- 2020-2021: SV Den Hoorn
- 2021-2023: PSV (Academy)
- 2024: VFC
- 2025: Barendrecht (Academy)
- 2025-: Feyenoord (Academy)
- * Club domestic league appearances and goals as of 2009-08-02

Sieme Zijm (born 25 January 1978) is a former Dutch footballer who last played for FC Emmen. His former clubs are Go Ahead Eagles, FC Zwolle, Sparta Rotterdam, Excelsior Rotterdam and FC Dordrecht.

As a manager, he was in charge at amateur clubs Westlandia, SV Den Hoorn, VFC Vlaardingen and Barendrecht.

== See also ==
- Sparta Rotterdam season 2001–02
