= Jusic =

Jusic, Jusić, or Jušić is a Serbo-Croatian surname. Notable people with the surname include:

- Adela Jušić (born 1982), contemporary visual artist from Bosnia and Herzegovina
- Đelo Jusić (1939–2019), Croatian-Bosniak composer, arranger, conductor and guitarist
- Hana Jušić (born 1983), Croatian film director and screenwriter
- Ibrica Jusić (born 1944), Croatian-Bosniak chanson, folk, pop and sevdalinka singer-songwriter, musician
- Zyad Jusić (born 1980), Yugoslav-born Dutch professional footballer
