= Carlos Fortes =

Carlos Fortes may refer to:

- Carlos Fortes (footballer, born 1974), Dutch footballer
- Carlos Fortes (footballer, born 1994), Cape Verdean footballer
