= Bram Marbus =

Dutch footballer

Personal information
- Full name: Abraham Alexander Marbus
- Date of birth: 16 April 1972 (age 54)
- Place of birth: Noordwijk, Netherlands
- Height: 1.94 m (6 ft 4 in)
- Position: Striker

Youth career
- VV Noordwijk

Senior career*
Years	Team	Apps	(Gls)
1992–1995	Excelsior	99	(18)
1995–1997	Cambuur	48	(10)
1997–1999	Go Ahead Eagles	56	(17)
1999–2002	Sparta Rotterdam	73	(13)
2002–2005	Go Ahead Eagles	86	(27)
2005–2007	VV Noordwijk		
- * Club domestic league appearances and goals

Abraham Alexander "Bram" Marbus (born 16 April 1972) is a Dutch former professional footballer who played as a striker. His brother Cees also played professional football for Go Ahead Eagles, among others.

== Career ==
Born in Noordwijk, Marbus began playing in the youth department of VV Noordwijk alongside players such as Edwin van der Sar, almost reaching the top tier for under-19 teams. After a serious car accident in May 1991, in which Marbus suffered a broken spine, among others, his football career seemed to over before it even started. A successful surgery followed, however, and a season later he was signed by Excelsior. Strong in the air, Marbus excelled as a striker in the second-tier Eerste Divisie, and would make his debut with Sparta Rotterdam in the Eredivisie during the 1999–2000 season, after stints at Cambuur and Go Ahead Eagles in the Eerste Divisie. At Sparta, he was part of a team which beat Ajax 3–0, and where Marbus scored one of the goals, as well as a 1–2 away win against Feyenoord in De Kuip. After three seasons, he eventually left the club in 2002, after new head coach Frank Rijkaard preferred other players in attack, including Houssin Bezzai, Murat Mazlum and Kenneth Cicilia.

Marbus retired from professional football in 2005 as part of Go Ahead Eagles, where he played alongside his brother Cees. He then returned to VV Noordwijk. This would however prove unsuccessful. Due to a chronic inflammation of his toes, his performances in the first team were often limited to late substitutions.

== Retirement ==
After his football career, Marbus began working as a real estate agent at Van der Meer Makelaardij.

In February 2009, Marbus suffered a cardiac arrest which he survived. He had an implantable cardioverter-defibrillator (ICD) implemented afterwards.

He has a wife, Marcella, and two sons, Ruben and Levi.
