= Fouzi Mesaoudi =

Dutch association football player

Personal information
- Date of birth: 27 May 1981 (age 45)
- Place of birth: Alphen aan den Rijn, Netherlands
- Position: Midfielder

Senior career*
Years	Team	Apps	(Gls)
-2003	Sparta Rotterdam	5	(0)
2003-2005	HFC Haarlem	28	(0)
	Chelsea F.C.	0	(0)
2005/2006	Falkirk F.C.	0	(0)
- AVV Alphen
- Koninklijke Wuustwezel Football Club
- KFC Brasschaat
- * Club domestic league appearances and goals

Fouzi Mesaoudi (born 27 May 1981 in the Netherlands) is a Dutch retired footballer.

== Career ==
After playing for Sparta Rotterdam in the Dutch second division, Mesaoudi signed for Chelsea, one of the most successful teams in England, but never made an appearance for them.

In 2005/06, he signed for Scottish club Falkirk after missing a transfer to Tottenham Hotspur in England, but again failed to make an appearance.

Due to injury, Mesaoudi eventually returned to the Netherlands, where he played amateur football.
