= Brutil Hosé =

Dutch footballer (born 1979)

Personal information
- Full name: Brutil Fridarius Hosé
- Date of birth: 9 October 1979 (age 47)
- Place of birth: Willemstad, Netherlands Antilles
- Height: 1.82 m (5 ft 11 1/2 in)
- Position: Forward

Youth career
- HRC Den Helder
- Jong Colombia

Senior career*
Years	Team	Apps	(Gls)
1998–2003	Ajax	17	(3)
2000–2001	→ De Graafschap (loan)	3	(0)
2001–2002	→ Haarlem (loan)	8	(2)
2002–2003	→ Sparta (loan)	16	(8)
2003–2004	Dordrecht	17	(3)
2004	Poseidón Néon Póron	9	(0)
2005	Al-Wakrah		
2006	Sarawak FA		
2006–2009	Haaglandia		
2009–2012	Leonidas		
2012–2013	Haaglandia	2	(0)
Total		72	(16)

International career
1995	Netherlands U17	3	(2)
1997	Netherlands U18	4	(0)
1997-1998	Netherlands U19	6	(7)
2000	Netherlands U21	2	(0)
2004	Netherlands Antilles	4	(2)
- * Club domestic league appearances and goals

Brutil Fridarius Hosé (born 9 October 1979) is a Dutch retired footballer who played as a forward.

== Club career ==
Hosé was born in Willemstad, Curaçao, Netherlands Antilles. When his mother passed away when he was 12, he moved to Den Helder with his siblings. Having arrived at Ajax at age 18, he appeared very rarely for the first team of the Eredivisie powerhouse during his five-year spell. His top division debut occurred on 15 November 1998, as he came on as a substitute for Benni McCarthy for the second half of an eventual 2–2 home draw against PSV Eindhoven. Deemed a huge talent, he never lived up to expectations.

Hosé also represented De Graafschap, Haarlem, Sparta Rotterdam – all loans from the Amsterdam club – Dordrecht, Poseidón Néon Póron (Greece), Al-Wakrah (Qatar), Sarawak (Malaysia Super League) and Haaglandia, retiring from professional football in 2009 at the age of only 29. He then joined amateur side Leonidas.

== International career ==
Hosé played 2 games for the Netherlands national under-21 football team and 4 for the U18s. In 2004, he was called up by and eventually played for the Netherlands Antilles national football team.

== Personal life ==
Hosé had five children, but lost his son Gilliamy aged 13 in 2016.
