= Chris Dekker =

Dutch footballer and manager

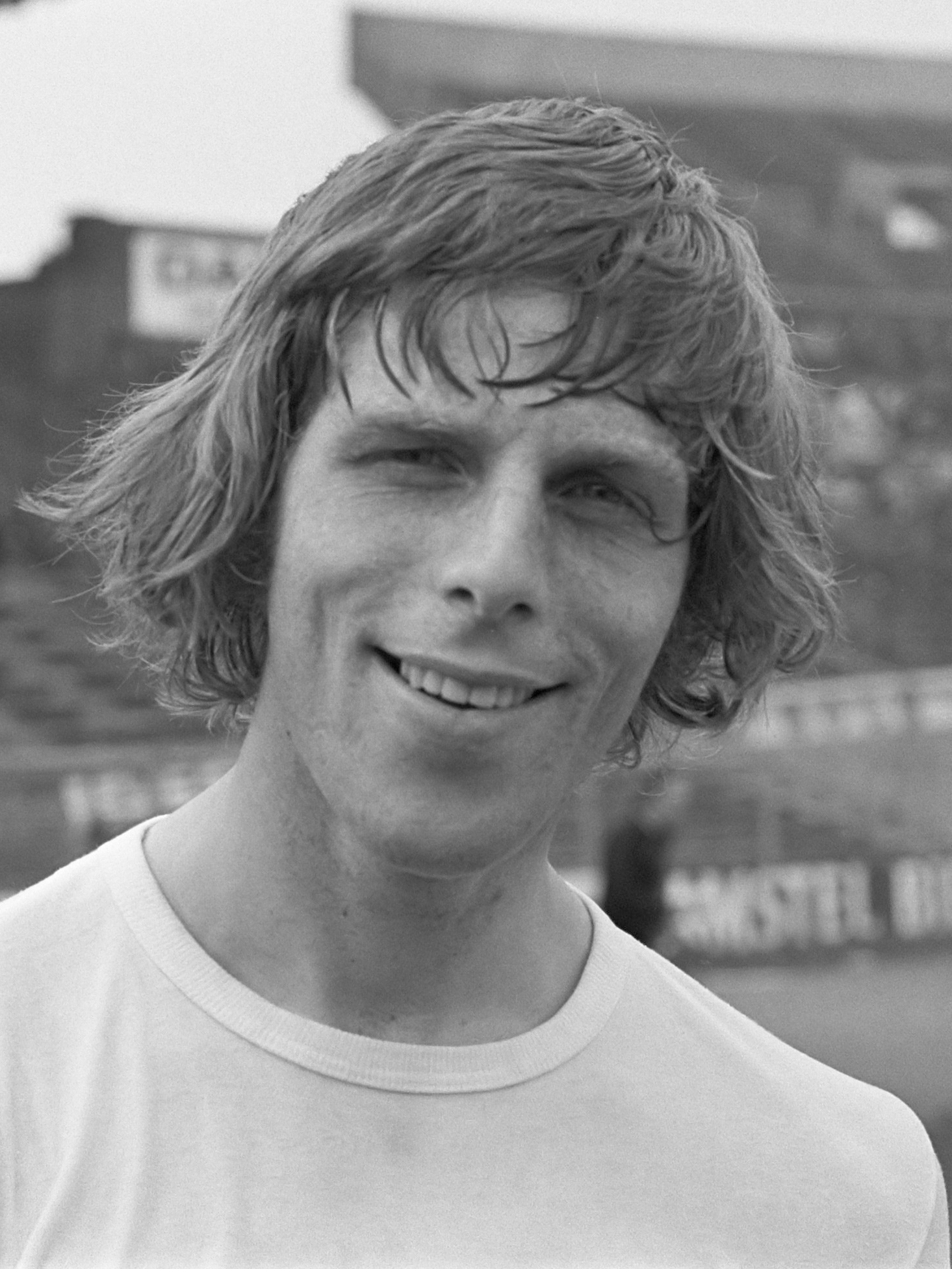
- Dekker in 1973

Personal information
- Full name: Chris Dekker
- Date of birth: 6 December 1945 (age 80)
- Place of birth: Westzaan, Netherlands
- Position: Defender

Youth career
- KFC
- ZVV Zaandijk

Senior career*
Years	Team	Apps	(Gls)
1965–1967	FC Zaanstreek	14	(0)
1967–1970	AZ'67	97	(9)
1970–1971	NEC	29	(2)
1971–1972	DWS	28	(3)
1972–1974	FC Amsterdam	64	(6)
1975–1977	MVV	77	(12)
1977–1981	Charleroi	108	(7)
1981	→ Seiko (loan)	17	(3)
1981–1982	Sparta	30	(1)
1982–1985	Fortuna Sittard	78	(2)
Total		542	(45)

International career
1974	Netherlands	1	(0)

Managerial career
- 1991–1992: FC Eindhoven
- 1992–1994: Fortuna Sittard
- 1995: Al-Jazira
- 1995–1996: FC Den Bosch
- 2000–2001: Qatar U-17
- 2002–2003: RBC
- 2003: Sparta
- 2004–2006: Fortuna Sittard
- 2011–2014: KFC
- * Club domestic league appearances and goals

Chris Dekker (born 6 December 1945 in Westzaan, North Holland) is a retired football defender and midfielder from the Netherlands.

== Playing career ==
=== Club ===
He played in AZ'67's first ever squad after the merger between his club FC Zaanstreek and Alkmaar '54 and also played for NEC, DWS and FC Amsterdam, before moving to Belgium to play for Charleroi (1977–1981). When he returned to Holland in 1981 he signed for Sparta Rotterdam and ended his career at Fortuna Sittard (1982–1985). He also played for Seiko Sports Association in Hong Kong in the early 80s.

=== International ===
He earned one cap for the Netherlands national football team, when he replaced Johan Neeskens on 27 March 1974 in a friendly against Austria. He only played 15 minutes for the Oranje.

== Managerial career ==
Dekker played his last match on 10 March 1985, and became a football manager, who coached Fortuna Sittard, FC Eindhoven, United Arab Emirates outfit Al-Jazira, FC Den Bosch, Qatar U-17, RBC, Sparta Rotterdam and Fortuna Sittard once again. He also was Academy boss at Feyenoord.

His most recent job was coach at his former youth club KFC.

== See also ==
- Sparta Rotterdam season 2002–03
