= Mustafa Amhaouch =

Dutch politician (born 1970)

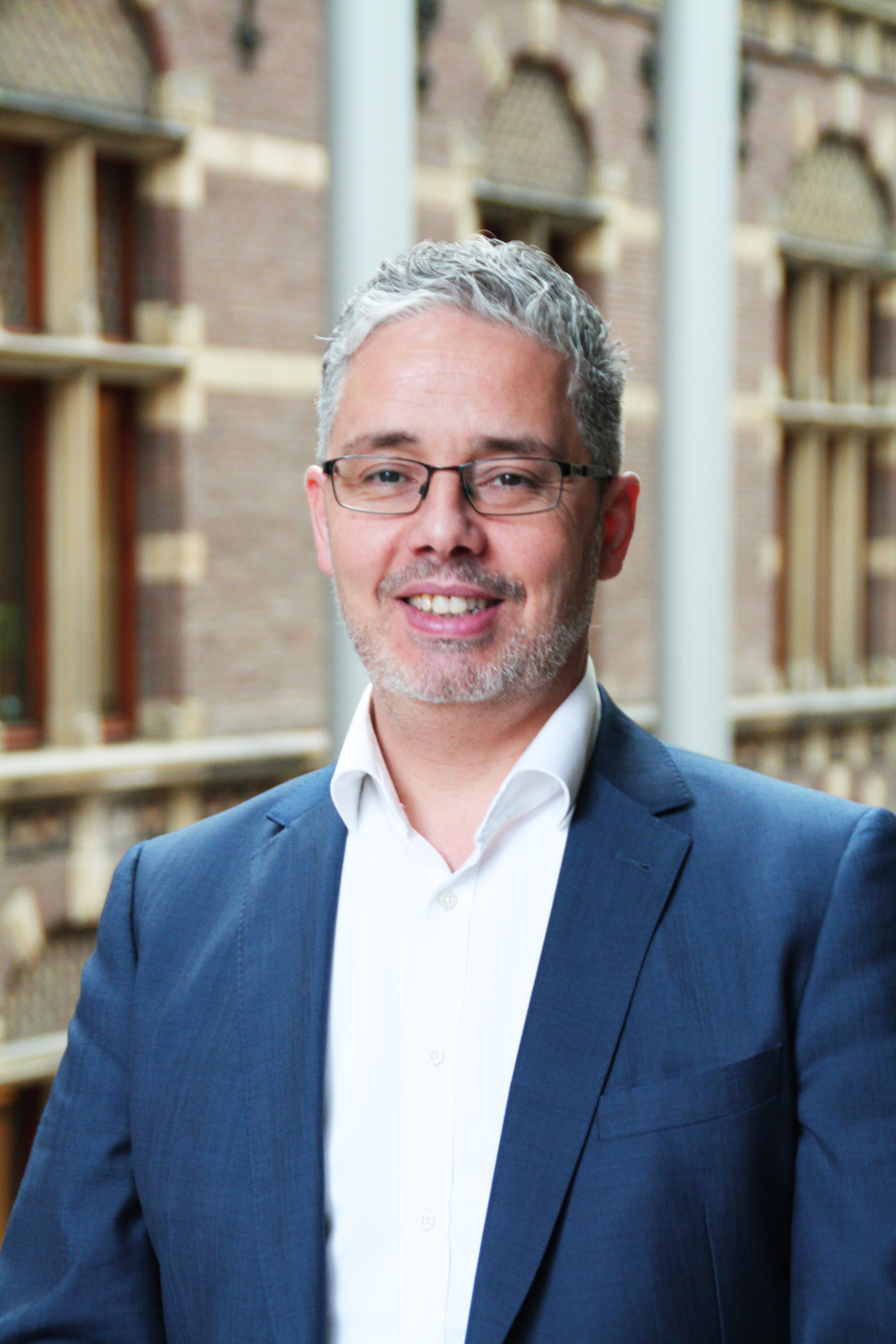
- Amhaouch in 2017

Member of the House of Representatives
- In office 12 January 2016 – 5 December 2023

Personal details
- Born: 27 June 1970 (age 56) Panningen, Netherlands
- Party: Christian Democratic Appeal
- Education: Fontys University of Applied Sciences
- Occupation: Engineer, politician

Mustafa Amhaouch (born 27 June 1970) is a Dutch engineer and former politician who served as a member of the House of Representatives for the Christian Democratic Appeal (CDA) from 2016 to 2023. Previously he served as a municipal councillor in Helden from 1997 to 2006.

== Career ==
Amhaouch was born on 27 June 1970 in Panningen, Limburg. His parents had immigrated from Morocco seven years before. Amhaouch received his primary education in Helden, afterwards he attended the lower technical school in Panningen from 1985 to 1988. The three subsequent years he attended the middle technical school in Venlo. He studied control theory at the Fontys University of Applied Sciences in Venlo from 1991 to 1995.

After finishing his education Amhaouch worked for Philips Medical Systems for a year. He then became an engineer and later manager at ASML, where he worked from 1996 to 2016, when he became a member of the House of Representatives.

Amhaouch was a member of the municipal council of Helden for the Christian Democratic Appeal (CDA) between March 1997 and March 2007, serving as CDA group leader between 2004 and 2006. In the 2010 general election Amhaouch occupied position 41 on the CDA list and was not elected. In the 2012 general election he occupied position 16 and was again not elected.

On 12 January 2016 Amhaouch joined the House of Representatives when he replaced Peter Oskam, who had been appointed mayor of Capelle aan den IJssel. He was the first CDA member of the House of Representatives of Moroccan descent, and the first Muslim since 2012. As a parliamentarian he focused on matters related to internal affairs, Kingdom relations, technology and ICT. He declined to run for reelection in 2023.

Amhaouch was made a member of the Order of Orange-Nassau on 27 April 2007 and a knight on 5 December 2023.

On 1 March 2025, he was made director of the Battery Competence Cluster, an organisation that facilitates public-private collaboration on battery technology, aimed at strengthening the Dutch position in the international battery value chain.

== Political positions ==
On being a Muslim in the Christian Democratic Appeal, Amhaouch said in 2020: "It's not surprising at all that a Muslim would vote for the CDA. I also stand for socially conservative values. The family as the cornerstone of society." He added: "When it comes to ethical issues, Muslims actually share the same views as Protestants and Catholics. The CDA is also a broad-based people's party for everyone".

== Decorations ==
Honours
Ribbon bar	Honour	Country	Date	Comment
	Knight of the Order of Orange-Nassau	Netherlands	5 December 2023	Member (2007)

== Electoral history ==
Electoral history of Mustafa Amhaouch
Year	Body	Party	Pos.	Votes	Result		Ref.
Year	Body	Party	Pos.	Votes	Party seats	Individual	Ref.
2021	House of Representatives	Christian Democratic Appeal	15	3,060	15	Won	
