= Jayson Trommel =

Dutch footballer (born 1982)

Personal information
- Full name: Jayson Trommel
- Date of birth: 21 August 1982 (age 44)
- Place of birth: Rotterdam, Netherlands
- Height: 1.88 m (6 ft 2 in)
- Position: Defender

Youth career
- Spijkenisse
- Sparta Rotterdam

Senior career*
Years	Team	Apps	(Gls)
2001–2004	Sparta Rotterdam	39	(5)
2004–2005	Kozakken Boys		
2005–2006	KVSK United	15	(0)
2006–2008	Cambuur	22	(2)
2008–2009	Leonidas		
2009–2011	VVSB	32	(3)
2011–2012	XerxesDZB		
2012–2014	ARC		
- * Club domestic league appearances and goals

Jayson Trommel (born 21 August 1982) is a Dutch former professional footballer who played as a defender.

== Career ==
Prior to joining the Sparta Rotterdam youth academy, Trommel played for local club VV Spijkenisse. He made his professional debut on 15 September 2001 in the Eredivisie match against Vitesse, coming on as a substitute for Tom Sier. A promising talent, Trommel received a lot of playing time under head coach Frank Rijkaard, as well as his successor Dolf Roks. He became a reserve player under Mike Snoei.

Trommel eventually played for the first team for three years, after which he did not see his contract renewed. He did not find a new professional club and therefore moved to Hoofdklasse club Kozakken Boys as the transfer window had now closed. A year later, he registered with DOTO before joining Belgian club KVSK United in July 2005 a month later. There, he signed a contract for a year with an option for a second year, but he eventually opted not to renew for a second season. The clause in the contract stated that upon promotion, the one-year commitment would automatically end. The club lost out on promotion on the last day of play and Trommel had already made his preparations for a return to Rotterdam, while he was under contract for another year.

A free agent, Trommel trained with Dordrecht while he tried to secure a contract. As a 23-year-old, Trommel eventually found his new club in Cambuur, where he signed an amateur contract on 15 August 2006 in the hope of earning a professional deal. He signed a professional contract with the club during the winter break.

Trommel would play for lower league clubs Leonidas, VVSB, XerxesDZB and ARC, before retiring from football in June 2014.
