= Max de Ligt =

Dutch footballer (born 2004)

Personal information
- Date of birth: 20 July 2004 (age 22)
- Place of birth: Utrecht, Netherlands
- Height: 1.89 m (6 ft 2 in)
- Position: Centre-back

Team information
- Current team: Sparta Rotterdam

Youth career
- Feyenoord Academy
- 2015–2022: FC Utrecht
- 2022–: Sparta Rotterdam

Senior career*
Years	Team	Apps	(Gls)
2023–	Jong Sparta Rotterdam	75	(3)
2024–	Sparta Rotterdam	0	(0)
- * Club domestic league appearances and goals as of 23 March 2026

Max de Ligt (born 20 July 2004) is a Dutch professional footballer who plays as a centre-back for Sparta Rotterdam, where he also represents Jong Sparta Rotterdam.

== Club career ==
=== Youth career ===
De Ligt began his football development in the youth academy of Feyenoord. In 2015, he joined the youth setup of FC Utrecht, where he played for several youth teams before moving to the academy of Sparta Rotterdam in 2022.

=== Senior career ===
From the 2022–23 season onwards, De Ligt became part of Jong Sparta Rotterdam, the reserve side competing in the Tweede Divisie. He quickly established himself as a regular starter in defence.

On 5 April 2024, De Ligt signed his first professional contract with Sparta Rotterdam until mid-2026, with an option for an additional year, which was later activated.

On 18 December 2024, De Ligt made his first-team debut for Sparta Rotterdam in a KNVB Cup match against Go Ahead Eagles. He came on during extra time, as Sparta were eventually eliminated after a penalty shoot-out.
