= Wim Meutstege =

Dutch footballer

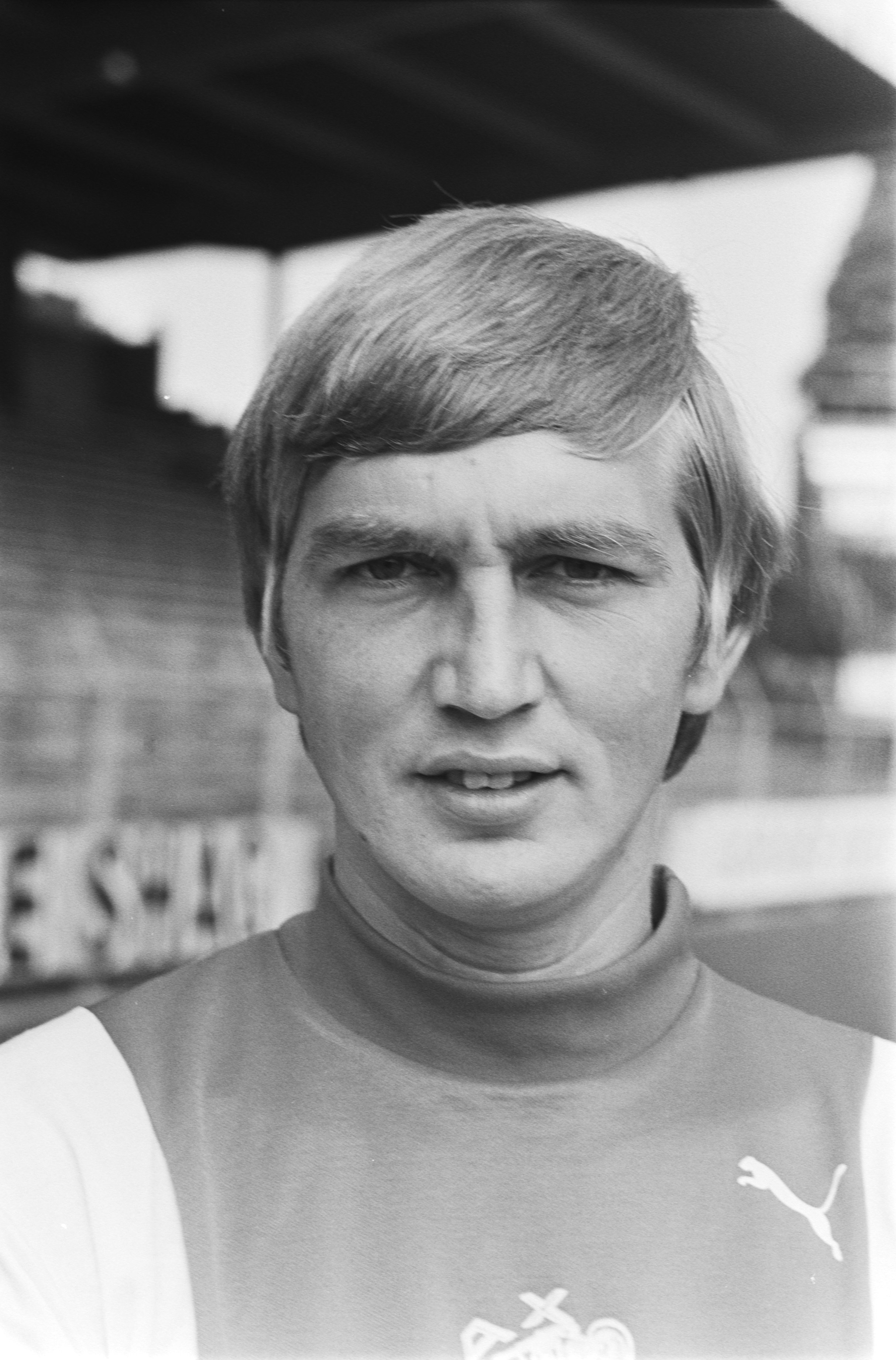

Personal information
- Full name: Willem Jan Meutstege
- Date of birth: 28 July 1952 (age 74)
- Place of birth: Lochem, Gelderland, Netherlands
- Position: Defender

Senior career*
Years	Team	Apps	(Gls)
1970–1971	Go Ahead Eagles		
1971–1973	Excelsior Rotterdam		
1973–1977	Sparta Rotterdam		
1977–1980	Ajax		

International career
1976	Netherlands	1	(0)
Medal record
Representing Netherlands
UEFA European Championship
Third place	1976 Yugoslavia
- * Club domestic league appearances and goals

Wim Meutstege (Dutch pronunciation: [ʋɪˈmøːtsteːɣə]; born 28 July 1952) is a Dutch former footballer who played as a defender.

== Career ==
During his club career he played for Go Ahead Eagles, Excelsior Rotterdam, Sparta Rotterdam and AFC Ajax. He earned 1 cap for the Netherlands national football team, and was included in their squad for the 1976 UEFA European Football Championship.
