= Michel Langerak =

Dutch footballer

Personal information
- Date of birth: 8 July 1968 (age 58)
- Place of birth: Dordrecht, Netherlands
- Position: Midfielder

Team information
- Current team: Kozakken Boys (assistant)

Youth career
- –1985: DVV Fluks
- 1985–1987: DS '79

Senior career*
Years	Team	Apps	(Gls)
1987–1995	Dordrecht	217	(55)
1991	→ VVV (loan)	10	(2)
1995–1997	NEC	55	(9)
1997–1999	AZ	62	(29)
1999–2002	Sparta Rotterdam	76	(8)
2002–2006	Deltasport		
2006–2007	Lienden		

Managerial career
- 2003–2005: Sparta Rotterdam (youth)
- 2005–2006: TOP Oss (youth)
- 2006–2007: De Zwerver
- 2007–2010: LRC Leerdam
- 2010–2013: Kozakken Boys
- 2013–2015: ASWH
- 2016–2018: Sliedrecht
- 2018–2019: Kozakken Boys
- 2019–: Kozakken Boys (assistant)
- * Club domestic league appearances and goals

Michel Langerak (born 8 July 1968) is a Dutch professional football manager and former player who is currently the assistant coach at Kozakken Boys.

== Playing career ==
Langerak played professionally from 1987 to 2003. He started his career with DS '79, which had changed its name from 1990–91 to Dordrecht '90. He made his debut as a professional football player on 13 December 1987 in a 1–2 loss to Sparta, when he came on as a substitute for Kees Koudstaal at halftime.

In 1991, Langerak was sent on a six-month loan deal VVV. He returned to Dordrecht, which had merged with SVV to form SVV/Dordrecht '90, which from 12 September 1992 was again called Dordrecht '90. In 1996, Langerak moved to NEC where he would play for a year and a half. After this, he played for AZ (1997–99) and ended his professional career at Sparta Rotterdam (1999–02).

Langerak played as an attacking midfielder. He made a total of 420 appearances in professional football and scored 103 goals. After retiring from professional football, he began playing in the amateur Hoofdklasse, first with Deltasport and since FC Lienden.

== Managerial career ==
Lanegerak started coaching for the youth teams of Sparta Rotterdam (2003–2005) and TOP Oss (2005–2006). Next he became the head coach of De Zwerver (2006–07), LRC Leerdam (2007–10), Kozakken Boys (2010–13), ASWH (2013–15), VV Sliedrecht (2016–18), and once more of Kozakken Boys (2018–19). Alongside, he works at the Oudehoven Lyceum in Gorinchem.
