= 2002–03 Eerste Divisie =

47th season of the second-tier football league in Netherlands

Eerste Divisie
- Season: 2002–03
- Champions: ADO Den Haag
- Promoted: ADO Den Haag; FC Volendam
- Goals: 946
- Average goals/game: 3.09

The Dutch Eerste Divisie in the 2002–03 season was contested by 18 teams. ADO Den Haag won the championship.

== Promoted teams ==
These teams were promoted to the Eredivisie

- ADO Den Haag — Eerste Divisie champions
- FC Volendam — playoff winners

== New entrants ==
Relegated from the 2001–02 Eredivisie

- FC Den Bosch
- Fortuna Sittard
- Sparta Rotterdam

== League standings ==
Pos	Team	Pld	W	D	L	GF	GA	GD	Pts	Promotion or qualification
1	ADO Den Haag	34	26	5	3	74	20	+54	83	Champion, promoted to the Eredivisie
2	FC Emmen	34	23	6	5	66	33	+33	75	Qualified for play-offs
3	Helmond Sport	34	19	7	8	72	44	+28	64	Qualified for play-offs
4	Heracles Almelo	34	18	6	10	78	52	+26	60	Qualified for play-offs
5	FC Den Bosch	34	18	6	10	62	38	+24	60	Qualified for play-offs
6	FC Volendam	34	18	6	10	61	44	+17	60	Promoted to the Eredivisie following play-offs
7	Go Ahead Eagles	34	17	7	10	74	55	+19	58	Qualified for play-offs
8	Sparta Rotterdam	34	13	6	15	60	62	−2	45	
9	TOP Oss	34	13	5	16	48	68	−20	44	
10	FC Eindhoven	34	11	8	15	41	49	−8	41	
11	Cambuur Leeuwarden	34	12	4	18	54	77	−23	40	
12	Stormvogels/Telstar	34	11	5	18	37	45	−8	38	
13	VVV-Venlo	34	10	7	17	42	60	−18	37	
14	HFC Haarlem	34	9	8	17	31	63	−32	35	
15	Fortuna Sittard	34	8	8	18	43	53	−10	32	
16	MVV	34	8	8	18	35	53	−18	32	
17	Veendam	34	8	8	18	37	66	−29	32	
18	FC Dordrecht	34	6	6	22	31	64	−33	24	

Source: rsssf.com

== Playoff standings ==
Group A
Pos	Team	Pld	W	D	L	GF	GA	GD	Pts
1	FC Zwolle	6	4	2	0	12	5	+7	14
2	Helmond Sport	6	3	1	2	9	10	−1	10
3	FC Den Bosch	6	2	1	3	7	10	−3	7
4	Go Ahead Eagles	6	1	0	5	9	12	−3	3

Source: rsssf.com

Group B
Pos	Team	Pld	W	D	L	GF	GA	GD	Pts
1	FC Volendam	6	4	0	2	12	7	+5	12
2	FC Emmen	6	3	0	3	6	6	0	9
3	Excelsior	6	3	0	3	8	9	−1	9
4	Heracles Almelo	6	2	0	4	6	10	−4	6

Source: rsssf.com

== Attendances ==
#	Club	Average
1	ADO	5,572
2	Heracles	5,038
3	Emmen	4,734
4	Sparta	4,289
5	Cambuur	4,231
6	Den Bosch	3,919
7	Go Ahead	3,542
8	Fortuna	3,435
9	Veendam	3,298
10	MVV	2,669
11	Helmond	2,513
12	VVV	2,357
13	Oss	2,155
14	Volendam	2,110
15	Eindhoven	1,771
16	Telstar	1,655
17	Dordrecht	1,540
18	Haarlem	1,441

== See also ==
- 2002–03 Eredivisie
- 2002–03 KNVB Cup
- 2002–03 Sparta Rotterdam season
