= John Nieuwenburg =

Dutch footballer (born 1978)

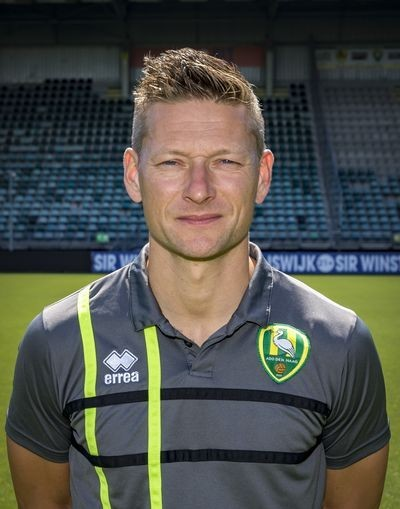

Personal information
- Date of birth: 24 December 1978 (age 47)
- Place of birth: Netherlands
- Position: Defender

Senior career*
Years	Team	Apps	(Gls)
1996–1999	Sparta	73	(2)
1999–2001	Ajax	24	(0)
2000–2002	→ Sparta (loan)	27	(0)
2004–2006	FC Dordrecht	50	(0)
2006–2008	Helmond Sport	62	(5)
2008–2010	Haarlem	41	(1)
2010–2015	Scheveningen		
- * Club domestic league appearances and goals

John Nieuwenburg (born 24 December 1978) is a Dutch former footballer who played as a defender.

== Early life ==
Nieuwenburg started his career with Dutch side Sparta . He debuted for the club at the age of seventeen.

== Career ==
In 1999, Nieuwenburg signed for Dutch side Ajax. In 2000, he returned to Dutch side Sparta on loan. He suffered a knee injury while playing for the club. In 2004, he signed for Dutch side FC Dordrecht. In 2006, he signed for Dutch side Helmond Sport. In 2008, he signed for Dutch side Haarlem. In 2010, he signed for Dutch side Scheveningen.

== Personal life ==
Nieuwenburg was born in 1992 in the Netherlands. After retiring from professional football, he worked as a physiotherapist.
