= Houssin Bezzai =

Dutch-Moroccan footballer

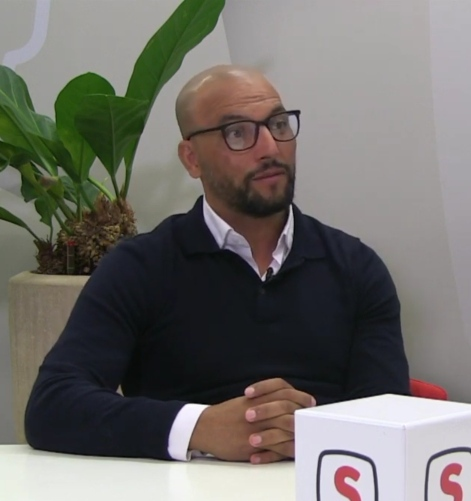

Personal information
- Date of birth: 4 November 1978 (age 47)
- Place of birth: El Aioun Sidi Mellouk, Morocco
- Position: Defender

Senior career*
Years	Team	Apps	(Gls)
1999–2002	Sparta Rotterdam	49	(0)
2002–2005	TOP Oss	83	(4)
2005-2006	Haarlem	33	(2)
2006–2011	Ter Leede		
2011–2012	Quick Boys		
2012–2013	Ter Leede		
2013-2016	Leidsche Boys		

International career
1997	Morocco U20		
Medal record
Representing Morocco
Africa U-20 Cup of Nations
Winner	Morocco 1997	U-20 Team
- * Club domestic league appearances and goals

Houssin Bezzai (Arabic: حسين بزاي; born 4 November 1978) is a former professional footballer. He played for Sparta Rotterdam, TOP Oss and Haarlem.

== Playing career ==
Bezzai came to the Netherlands at a young age, and made his debut in professional football on 7 November 1999 as part of Sparta Rotterdam in a 1–2 home loss to Ajax in the Eredivisie. He came on as a substitute for Steve Goossen in the 31st minute. He played his last professional game on 14 April 2006 as part of HFC Haarlem, when he was replaced by Ray Fränkel after 86 minutes in the 1–3 loss to PEC Zwolle. After his retirement from professional football in August 2006, Bezzai joined the amateur club Ter Leede.

Bezzai was a Moroccan youth international and won the 1997 African Youth Championship.

== Retirement ==
After his football career, Bezzai founded Sport United together with a partner. The company focuses, among other things, on the organisation of events and career counseling for athletes. Within the company, vulnerable youths are also guided through work and education. At the end of 2010, this work culminated in Fruit & Go – a smoothie / sandwich bar in Leiden, which was founded together with fellow former professional footballer Tim de Cler. That company merged into the Leids Inzet Collectief, a secondment company for youths with an occupational disability. Since March 2020, Bezzai has also been program manager for racism and discrimination at the Royal Dutch Football Association (KNVB).

== Honours ==
=== International ===
Morocco U20

- Africa U-20 Cup of Nations: 1997
