= Bonner Strassenbahn ROSWINDIS =

Type and origin
- Power type: Steam
- Builder: Hohenzollern
- Serial number: 1122
- Build date: 1898
- Rebuilder: ZVTM
- Rebuild date: 1914
- Number rebuilt: 3
Specifications
Career
- Withdrawn: 1935
- Scrapped: 1937

Bonner Strassenbahn ROSWINDIS was a steam locomotive built by Hohenzollern in 1898. It was originally built for the Bonner Strassenbahn. It was bought for the construction of the MBS Nijmegen-Venlo line by C.P. Stuy (Nijmegen, Netherlands) in 1914.

In 1915 the locomotive was thoroughly repaired in the VMH workshops (Helden, Netherlands) and rented to the ZVTM, who gave it #3. The locomotive was sold to the VMH in 1917. It was renumbered #5 by the VMH. Before entering into service in 1919, it was once again thoroughly repaired. When the VMH was absorbed into the LTM in 1923, the locomotive was renumbered #17.

The cabin of the locomotive was later extended by the LTM to increase the very small room between the boiler and the front and rear walls of the cabin. The new front and rear of the locomotive were extended outside of the frame. At the same time, additional water storage was added between frame and axles.

The name Venlo was added to the locomotive by the LTM at some point in time. This name plate was taken from VMH locomotive #1. The MBS purchased all former VMH lines and equipment of the LTM in 1929. This locomotive retained #17 at that time. It was taken out of service in 1935, and sold for scrap in 1937.
