= De Zwerver =

Dutch football club

Kinderdijkse Voetbalvereniging "De Zwerver" (official name) is an association football club from Kinderdijk, Netherlands. It was founded on 12 June 1933 and plays in a red-black kit at Sportpark De Schans. Since 1919, its first squad plays in the Saturday Tweede Klasse West II (2019/20). The tiny village team was initially known for the relative strength of its men's squad and, more recently, for the success of its women's squad.

== History ==
Since De Zwerver's foundation, the team has played for five periods in the Eerste Klasse. The last time ended in 2014. The women's squad starred that very season as it played in the national KNVB cup. In the final table of 2019–20 the women's first squad led the next two teams, VV Groot-Ammers and VV Sliedrecht, by 4 points, while having played one game less. Nevertheless, it wasn't entitled to a Vierde Klasse championship or to promotion due to the COVID-19 pandemic in the Netherlands.

== Associated people ==
- Michel Langerak received his first break at managing any first squad at De Zwerver, in the season of 2006–07.
- Gerrie Slagboom played in the De Zwerver youth, one season (1983–84) in its first squad, from where he continued 1984 through 1993 in professional football, both in the Eredivisie and Eerste Divisie.
