= Rui Monteiro (footballer, born 1977) =

Cape Verdean footballer

Personal information
- Full name: Rui Almeida Monteiro
- Date of birth: 15 June 1977 (age 49)
- Place of birth: Praia, Cape Verde
- Position: Winger

Senior career*
Years	Team	Apps	(Gls)
1998–2000	FC Dordrecht	56	(5)
2000–2003	Sparta	60	(0)
2003	Portimonense	27	(0)
2004–2006	FC Dordrecht	67	(4)
2006–2009	Leonidas		

International career
2003–2005	Cape Verde	7	(0)
- * Club domestic league appearances and goals

Rui Almeida Monteiro (born 15 June 1977) is a Cape Verdean retired professional football player.

== Club career ==
Born in Cape Verde, he made his debut in professional football on 22 August 1998 for FC Dordrecht in a game against HFC Haarlem replacing Giovanni Franken in the 83rd minute.

He played in the Eredivisie for Sparta, but was released by the club after the 2002/03 season. He signed for Portuguese side Portimonense, only to return to Dordrecht in summer 2004. He was released by them in 2006 and later played for amateur sides Leonidas, Zwaluwen and ZBC'97.

== See also ==
- Sparta Rotterdam season 2001–02
- Sparta Rotterdam season 2002–03
