= Cees Marbus =

Dutch association footballer

Personal information
- Date of birth: 14 December 1968 (age 57)
- Place of birth: Noordwijk, Netherlands
- Height: 1.95 m (6 ft 5 in)
- Position: Defender

Youth career
- VV Noordwijk
- Quick Boys
- VV Noordwijk

Senior career*
Years	Team	Apps	(Gls)
1989–1996	Go Ahead Eagles	115	(5)
1996–1998	Volendam	25	(1)
1998–2000	Go Ahead Eagles	52	(2)
Total		192	(8)
- * Club domestic league appearances and goals

Cees Marbus (born 14 December 1968) is a Dutch former professional footballer who played as a defender. His brother Bram also played professional football.

== Career ==
Marbus grew up in Noordwijk and played youth football for local club VV Noordwijk alongside his brother, Bram, as well as future Manchester United and Netherlands international goalkeeper Edwin van der Sar. Marbus had a short stint with Quick Boys from Katwijk aan Zee, before returning to VV Noordwijk after two years, as he failed to break through to the first team. In his teenage years, he left Noordwijk for Deventer to study at the Van Hall Larenstein. In addition, he practiced twice a week with the Go Ahead Eagles team.

In the summer of 1989, Go Ahead Eagles decided to offer Marbus a contract under head coach Fritz Korbach. He made his debut in a game against RBC where he covered future international striker Pierre van Hooijdonk. In 1992, the team won promotion to the Eredivisie through the play-offs. In the season opener against Cambuur, he made his debut at the highest level. A week later he scored his first top tier goal in a match against Ajax. Nevertheless, Ajax won the match 3–1 thanks to two goals from Dennis Bergkamp and one from Stefan Pettersson. Marbus formed the heart of the defense for four seasons together with Mark Schenning and eventually reached 99 appearances in the Eredivisie, in which he scored four goals.

In January 1997, Marbus signed a three-and-a-half-year contract with Volendam, where he was brought in to succeed club legend Robert Molenaar who had left for Leeds United. At Volendam, he played under head coach Hans van der Zee, who had previously been coach at Quick Boys where Marbus had failed to make the team. Marbus had been signed by Volendam, after Elroy Kromheer from PEC Zwolle and Marco Gentile from MVV had been considered too expensive. He played 25 games for the club through a year and a half.

In 1998, Marbus returned to Go Ahead Eagles, who had suffered relegation to the Eerste Divisie six months after his departure. He played 42 matches with the club before retiring from football in 2000.

== Retirement ==
Marbus has worked as assistant coach for Derde Klasse club SV Colmschate '33.
