= Jamal Dibi =

Dutch Moroccan footballer (born 1979)

Personal information
- Date of birth: 5 December 1979 (age 46)
- Place of birth: Vlissingen, Netherlands
- Height: 1.78 m (5 ft 10 in)
- Position: Striker

Youth career
- VC Vlissingen
- –1998: DWS Amsterdam

Senior career*
Years	Team	Apps	(Gls)
1998–1999	Telstar	29	(9)
1999–2004	AZ	45	(6)
1999–2000	→ Telstar (loan)	33	(8)
2002–2003	→ Go Ahead Eagles (loan)	13	(3)
2004	→ Stormvogels Telstar (loan)	7	(0)
2004–2005	Haarlem	7	(1)
2005–2006	Umm Salal		
2006–2007	Omniworld	17	(8)
2007	Moghreb Tétouan		
2007–2008	Al Ahli		
2008	Omniworld	8	(2)
2009	DPMM		
2009–2010	Rijnvogels	15	(12)
2010	Lisse	2	(0)
2010–2011	Al-Mesaimeer		
2011	Katwijk		
2011–2014	Chabab	50	(19)
2014	New Radiant		
2014–2015	EDO	13	(5)
2015–2018	Zeeburgia		
- * Club domestic league appearances and goals

Jamal Dibi (born 5 December 1979) is a Dutch-Moroccan retired footballer who played as a forward. He currently operates as a FIFA-licensed football agent out of the Amsterdam area.

== Career ==
In 2003, Dibi signed for AZ but left them in 2004 for Stormvogels Telstar after having been loaned out to Go Ahead Eagles. After stints at several clubs, he joined Omniworld in September 2006.

During a holiday in Qatar, Dutch manager Mark Wotte invited him to train with his club Al Ahli and Dibi quickly signed professional terms with the club. After one and a half year he returned to Omniworld, only to move abroad again for a short spell in Brunei with DPMM.

In 2011, he signed for Katwijk and a couple of months later for Chabab.

Back in 2013, Dibi had a trial with Indonesian side Persijap Jepara. However, he cut back on the deal six days later, citing familial reasons.

Contacted by a Singaporean agent in 2014, Dibi sealed a move to perpetual Maldivian Premier League title contenders New Radiant, with the option of a contract extension. In his first few games there, the Dutch forward recorded one goal and four assists, losing his first match to rivals Maziya S&RC 1-0. On the level of play in the island nation, the Vlissingen native stated that he was surprised by how physical it was.

== External link ==
- Jamal Dibi at Ererat (in Dutch)
