= International Lyrics Server =

The International Lyrics Server was a Swiss website from February 1997 to January 1999, set up by Pascal de Vries to host crowdsourced song lyrics at the site lyrics.ch. By the time it was closed, it hosted over 100,000 songs and received a million pageviews per day.

Pascal de Vries said that he did not intend to commercialize the service, but accepted advertising for the stated purpose of helping to cover the costs of running the system. Some music industry companies claimed that he was profiting from their intellectual property; on January 14, 1999, Swiss police seized equipment from his apartment and the service's web host in response to a criminal copyright violation complaint filed on behalf of eight music publishing companies including PolyGram and EMI, and the site closed.
