= Reginald Faria =

Dutch footballer

Personal information
- Full name: Marcel Erwin Reginald Faria
- Date of birth: 19 November 1981 (age 44)
- Place of birth: Amsterdam, Netherlands
- Position: Striker

Youth career
- Ajax
- AZ
- ADO Den Haag

Senior career*
Years	Team	Apps	(Gls)
2001–2004	Volendam	74	(13)
2005	→ Haarlem (loan)	6	(2)
2005–2007	TOP Oss	62	(13)
2007–2010	Omniworld	72	(12)
2010–2011	Sektzia Ness Ziona	3	(0)
2011	Huizen		
2013–2016	SC Feyenoord		
- * Club domestic league appearances and goals

Reginald Faria (born November 1981) is a Dutch retired footballer who played for Dutch Eredivisie Club FC Volendam during 2003-2004 season.

== Club career ==
Faria made his professional debut for Eerste Divisie outfit Volendam on 19 August 2001 against FC Emmen and had spells at Haarlem, TOP Oss and Omniworld before moving abroad to play for Israeli second tier club Sektzia Ness Ziona.

He left the club in February 2011 claiming they owed him salary and joined Dutch amateurs Huizen, only to leave them two months later after falling out with their manager. He finished his career at amateur side SC Feyenoord in 2016.
