= Marilia (footballer) =

Brazilian footballer (born 1975)

Personal information
- Full name: Reginaldo de Santana
- Date of birth: July 22, 1975 (age 51)
- Place of birth: Umuarama, Brazil
- Height: 1.80 m (5 ft 11 in)
- Position: Centre-back

Senior career*
| Years | Team | Apps | (Gls) |
| 1996–2003 | Sparta Rotterdam | 149 | (5) |
| 2003–2004 | Aurora FC | | |
| 2004–2006 | Clube 15 de Novembro | | |
| 2006 | VVV-Venlo | 7 | (1) |
| 2007 | Sport Club Ulbra | | |
| 2007–2008 | SER Caxias do Sul | | |
| 2009 | Criciúma | | |
| 2009 | Veranópolis | | |
| 2009 | Concórdia | | |
| 2010 | Veranópolis | | |
| 2011 | Penapolense | | |
- * Club domestic league appearances and goals

Reginaldo de Santana (born 22 July 1975), commonly known as Marilia, is a Brazilian former professional footballer who played as a centre-back.

== Club career ==
Marillia made his debut in Dutch professional football on 24 August 1996 for Sparta Rotterdam in a game against NAC Breda. He signed a six-month contract with Sport Club Ulbra in January 2007. on August 16, 2007, he left for SER Caxias do Sul.

In December 2008, he signed a one-year contract with Criciúma. In January 2009, he left for Veranópolis and in July for Concórdia.
