= Peter Hofstede =

Dutch footballer

Personal information
- Date of birth: January 28, 1967 (age 59)
- Place of birth: Oosterbeek, Gelderland
- Position: Striker

Team information
- Current team: Telstar (Techn.manager)

Youth career
- OVC'85 (Oosterbeek)

Senior career*
| Years | Team | Apps | (Gls) |
| 1990–1992 | De Graafschap | 66 | (35) |
| 1992–1994 | Roda JC | 66 | (28) |
| 1994–1997 | Utrecht | 57 | (13) |
| 1997–1999 | Helmond Sport | 51 | (30) |
| 1999–2001 | Emmen | 66 | (31) |
| 2001–2004 | ADO Den Haag | 77 | (23) |
| Total | | 383 | (160) |
- * Club domestic league appearances and goals

Peter Hofstede (born January 28, 1967, in Oosterbeek, Gelderland) is a retired football striker from the Netherlands, who made his professional debut in the 1990-1991 season for De Graafschap. Later on he played for Roda JC, FC Utrecht, Helmond Sport, FC Emmen, and ADO Den Haag.

He finished his career at amateur side FC Lienden while working as a scout for ADO Den Haag.

== Post-playing career ==
After retiring as a player, Hofstede became a technical director or manager and worked in that position for ADO Den Haag and De Graafschap. He was appointed at Telstar in 2023 and is regarded as the architect of the successful team that won promotion to the Eredivisie after 47 years in the second tier.

Hofstede was named as one of several victims in a fraudulent case regarding a former Roda JC youth player who pretended to be Hofstede and scammed clubs and player agents.
