= Jan Smit (footballer) =

Dutch footballer

Personal information
- Date of birth: 27 February 1983 (age 43)
- Place of birth: Purmerend, Netherlands
- Position: Forward

Senior career*
Years	Team	Apps	(Gls)
2002–2006	Volendam	25	(3)
- * Club domestic league appearances and goals

Jan Smit (born 27 February 1983) is a Dutch former professional footballer who played as a forward for Volendam.
