= Victor Kros =

Dutch footballer

Personal information
- Full name: Victor Kros
- Date of birth: 11 September 1981 (age 45)
- Place of birth: Rotterdam, Netherlands
- Position: Goalkeeper

Senior career*
| Years | Team | Apps | (Gls) |
| 2001–2003 | Sparta Rotterdam | 16 | (0) |
- * Club domestic league appearances and goals as of 5 August 2009 ‡ National team caps and goals as of 9 July 2007

Victor Kros (born 11 September 1981) is a Dutch former football goalkeeper. He made his debut in Dutch professional football on 20 January 2002 for Sparta Rotterdam, replacing Frank Kooiman in a game against AZ Alkmaar.
