= Denni Conteh =

Danish footballer and manager (born 1975)

Personal information
- Full name: Denni Aluseny Conteh
- Date of birth: 14 August 1975 (age 51)
- Place of birth: Copenhagen, Denmark
- Height: 1.80 m (5 ft 11 in)
- Positions: Winger; striker

Youth career
- B93
- Boldklubben Frem
- 1993–1994: Lyngby BK

Senior career*
Years	Team	Apps	(Gls)
1994–1995	Lyngby FC	12	(4)
1996	Ølstykke		
1996–1997	Hvidovre IF	14	(4)
1997–2000	RC Strasbourg	45	(4)
2000	→Viborg FF (loan)	10	(2)
2000–2002	Herfølge BK	28	(10)
2002–2003	Sparta Rotterdam	26	(7)
2003–2004	FC Nordsjælland	24	(6)
2004–2006	Odense BK	6	(0)
2006	→Molde (loan)	5	(0)
2006	Akademisk Boldklub	8	(3)
2007	Boldklubben Frem	7	(1)
2007	KÍ Klaksvík		
2008	Slagelse B&I	19	(3)

International career
1993	Denmark U19	2	(0)

Managerial career
- 2010–2013: Ballerup-Skovlunde Fodbold (women)
- * Club domestic league appearances and goals

Denni Aluseny Conteh (born 14 August 1975) is a Danish former journeyman football player of Sierra-Leonean descent and current coach.

He was from 2010 until October 2013 manager of the Danish female elite team of Ballerup-Skovlunde Fodbold.
