= Steve Goossen =

Dutch footballer

Personal information
- Date of birth: 12 November 1968 (age 57)
- Place of birth: Goirle, Netherlands
- Position: Defender

Senior career*
Years	Team	Apps	(Gls)
1989–1996	Lierse	183	(2)
1996–1999	Vitesse	71	(0)
1999–2002	Sparta	73	(0)
Total		327	(2)
- * Club domestic league appearances and goals

Steve Goossen (born 12 November 1968) is a Dutch former professional footballer who played as a defender.

== Career ==
Goossen was born in Goirle, North Brabant, but spent a large part of his childhood in Suriname. Goossen eventually left for Belgian club Lierse, where he made his breakthrough as a senior player.

At the age of 21, the centre back made his debut in professional football for Lierse. Within a year, Goossen had become a starter. He played for the Belgian club for seven seasons. Before the start of the 1996–97 season, Goossen signed with Eredivisie club Vitesse. Goossen eventually made 71 appearances for Vitesse, alternating as left back and central defender. Due to the arrival of Pieter Collen, Vitesse decided not to renew his contract in 1999, and he eventually left for Sparta Rotterdam. After Sparta's relegation in the 2001–02 season, Goossen decided to retire from professional football, citing a lack of motivation. He played one more season at amateur level for Deltasport in the Hoofdklasse.
