= Carlos Fortes (footballer, born 1974) =

Dutch footballer

Personal information
- Full name: Carlos Fortes
- Date of birth: 27 April 1974 (age 52)
- Place of birth: Rotterdam, Netherlands
- Position: Winger

Senior career*
Years	Team	Apps	(Gls)
1992–1997	Sparta	102	(9)
1997–2002	Vitesse	66	(0)
2002–2003	Sparta	18	(0)
Total		186	(9)
- * Club domestic league appearances and goals as of 5 August 2009 ‡ National team caps and goals as of 9 July 2007

Carlos Fortes (born 27 April 1974) is a Dutch retired football forward. He made his debut in Dutch professional football on 31 May 1993 for Sparta Rotterdam, replacing Gerald Sandel in a league game against Roda JC (2-4).

Fortes also played for Vitesse, where he was kicked out of a European game against SC Braga, but he returned to Sparta as an amateur after his contract with the Arnhem club was not renewed. He retired in 2003, after persisting injuries.
