= Marc Eberle =

German footballer (born 1980)

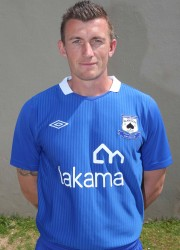
- Eberle in 2011

Personal information
- Date of birth: 3 June 1980 (age 46)
- Place of birth: Aachen, West Germany
- Height: 1.83 m (6 ft 0 in)
- Position: Defender

Team information
- Current team: G team Kerkrade west

Senior career*
Years	Team	Apps	(Gls)
2000	Roda JC	0	(0)
2000–2002	Patro Eisden MM	45	(1)
2002–2003	→ VVV-Venlo (loan)	22	(1)
2003–2005	Patro Eisden MM	58	(3)
2005–2006	KVV Heusden-Zolder	20	(0)
2006	Dessel	4	(0)
2006–2007	Lierse	6	(0)
2007–2009	KVSK United	76	(1)
2009–2010	Aris Limassol	24	(0)
2010–2011	Mpumalanga Black Aces	20	(0)
2011–2012	MVV Maastricht	11	(0)
2012–2013	EVV	14	(0)
2013–2014	EHC Hoensbroek		
- * Club domestic league appearances and goals

Marc Eberle (born 3 June 1980) is a German former professional footballer who played as a defender.
