= Harvey Bischop =

Dutch retired professional footballer

Personal information
- Date of birth: 8 July 1982 (age 44)
- Place of birth: The Hague, Netherlands
- Position: Leftback

Senior career*
| Years | Team | Apps | (Gls) |
| 2002–2004 | Cambuur | 32 | (4) |
| 2004–2007 | FC Zwolle | 59 | (0) |
| 2007–2008 | Dessel Sport | | |
- * Club domestic league appearances and goals as of 12 October 2016

Harvey Bischop (born 8 July 1982 in The Hague) is a Dutch retired professional footballer who works as physiotherapist at Cambuur.

== Club career ==
Bischop played for Eerste Divisie clubs Cambuur and FC Zwolle during the 2002-2007 football seasons. He also had a spell in Belgium with Dessel Sport.

He later played for amateur sides Sneek Zwart Wit, Be Quick '28 and Harkemase Boys.

He joined Drachtster Boys in 2014, while operating his own physiotherapy business in Leeuwarden.
