= Dolf Roks =

Dutch footballer and manager

Personal information
- Full name: Dolf Roks
- Date of birth: 21 November 1962 (age 63)
- Place of birth: Zierikzee, Netherlands

Senior career*
Years	Team	Apps	(Gls)
1968–1978	SV Duiveland		
1978–1981	VV Zierikzee		

Managerial career
- 1986–1995: Sparta Rotterdam (youth coach)
- 1996–1999: Sparta Rotterdam (assistant)
- 1999–2001: Sparta Rotterdam (head coach)
- 2001: Sparta Rotterdam (assistant)
- 2001–2003: Sparta Rotterdam (technical manager)
- 2003–2005: VV Kloetinge (head coach)
- 2005–2006: RBC Roosendaal (head coach)
- * Club domestic league appearances and goals

Dolf Roks (born 21 November 1962 in Zierikzee) is a former amateur football player from the Netherlands. As a football coach he had a long time spell with Sparta Rotterdam, before being fired on 22 January 2003.

== See also ==
- 2002–03 Sparta Rotterdam season
