= Lionel Lord =

Dutch footballer

Personal information
- Full name: Lionel Godfried Lord
- Date of birth: November 3, 1980 (age 45)
- Place of birth: Middelburg, Netherlands
- Position: Forward

Senior career*
Years	Team	Apps	(Gls)
1999–2003	SC Heerenveen		
2002–2003	SC Cambuur-Leeuwarden		
2003–2004	FC Dordrecht		
2004–2005	Sportfreunde Siegen		
2005–2006	Fortuna Sittard		
2006–2008	KV Oostende		
2008–2010	Eendracht Aalst		
- * Club domestic league appearances and goals

Lionel Godfried Lord (born November 3, 1980, in Middelburg) is a Dutch of Suriname descent football striker who last played for Eendracht Aalst in Belgium.
