= Paul Weerman =

Dutch footballer

Personal information
- Date of birth: 21 January 1977 (age 49)
- Place of birth: Emmen, Drenthe, Netherlands
- Height: 1.95 m (6 ft 5 in)
- Position: Forward

Senior career*
Years	Team	Apps	(Gls)
2000–2002	FC Emmen	34	(15)
2002–2005	BV Veendam	71	(21)
2005–2006	Preußen Münster	15	(4)
2006–2007	First Vienna FC	17	(4)
2006–2007	FC Emmen	9	(1)
2007–2008	SV Meppen	23	(6)
2008–2011	WKE '16		

Managerial career
- 2014–2016: WKE '16
- 2019–2022: VV Staphorst
- * Club domestic league appearances and goals

Paul Weerman (born 21 January 1977) is a Dutch football manager and former player. A forward, he was top scorer of the Eerste Divisie for FC Emmen, scoring 14 goals in the 2001–02 season. Weerman had short spells in Germany with Preußen Münster and SV Meppen and with First Vienna FC in Austria. He is the son of former handball player Harry Weerman.
