= Ben Haverkort =

Dutch footballer and referee

- Born: 27 October 1961 (age 64); Amsterdam
Association football career
- Position: Midfielder
Youth career
- Amstelland
- 1977-1979: Zeeburgia
- 1979-1981: Ajax
Senior career*
Years	Team	Apps	(Gls)
1981-1985	Telstar	88	(15)
1985-1989	Cambuur	96	(12)
1989-1995	Emmen	170	(10)
Total		354	(37)
International career
1979–1980	Netherlands U19	10	(0)
- * Club domestic league appearances and goals
Refereeing career
Domestic
Years	League	Role
1999–2011	Eredivisie	Referee
International
Years	League	Role
2002–2006	FIFA listed	Referee

Bernardus Hermanus "Ben" Haverkort (born 27 October 1961) is a Dutch retired football player and referee. He played professional football in the Dutch second division before taking up refereeing, officiating in the Dutch first division and international football.

== Playing career ==
After playing youth football for FC Amstelland, Zeeburgia and Ajax, Haverkort spent time at Eerste Divisie teams Telstar, SC Cambuur and Emmen. He also played 10 matches for the Netherlands national under-19 football team.

== Refereeing career ==
After retiring from playing Haverkort took up refereeing in 1995 getting to national league level in 1999. Haverkort earned a place on the FIFA International Referees List beginning in 2002, serving as a fourth official in Euro 2004 qualifiers and 2006 World Cup qualifiers.

Haverkort retired from refereeing in 2011 to take up a management role for FC Groningen. He worked as a commercial director for Emmen between 2017 and 2023. He was named commercial director of nautic event DelfSail in March 2023.
