= Ousmane Sanou =

Burkinabé footballer

Personal information
- Date of birth: 11 March 1978 (age 48)
- Place of birth: Bobo Dioulasso, Upper Volta
- Height: 1.78 m (5 ft 10 in)
- Position: Striker

Senior career*
Years	Team	Apps	(Gls)
1995–1996	RC Bobo Dioulasso		
1996–2001	Willem II	105	(15)
2001–2003	Sparta Rotterdam	34	(3)
2003–2004	FC Eindhoven	26	(7)
2004–2005	Kozakken Boys	?	(?)
2005–2006	Turnhout	10	(1)
2006–2008	K. Berchem Sport	51	(21)
2008–2009	TOP Oss	12	(2)
2009–2010	VV UNA		
2010–2011	V.C. Herentals		
Total		238	(49)

International career
1995–2002	Burkina Faso	21	(4)
- * Club domestic league appearances and goals

Ousmane Sanou (born 11 March 1978) is a Burkinabé former professional footballer who played as a striker.

== Club career ==
Sanou was born in Bobo Dioulasso, Upper Volta. He made his debut in professional football for Willem II, on 28 August 1996 replacing Geoffrey Prommayon in the second half against RKC Waalwijk.

== International career ==
He was part of the Burkina Faso national team's 2000 African Nations Cup team which finished bottom of group C in the first round of competition, thus failing to secure qualification for the quarter-finals.
