= Peter Oskam =

Dutch politician, judge and football referee

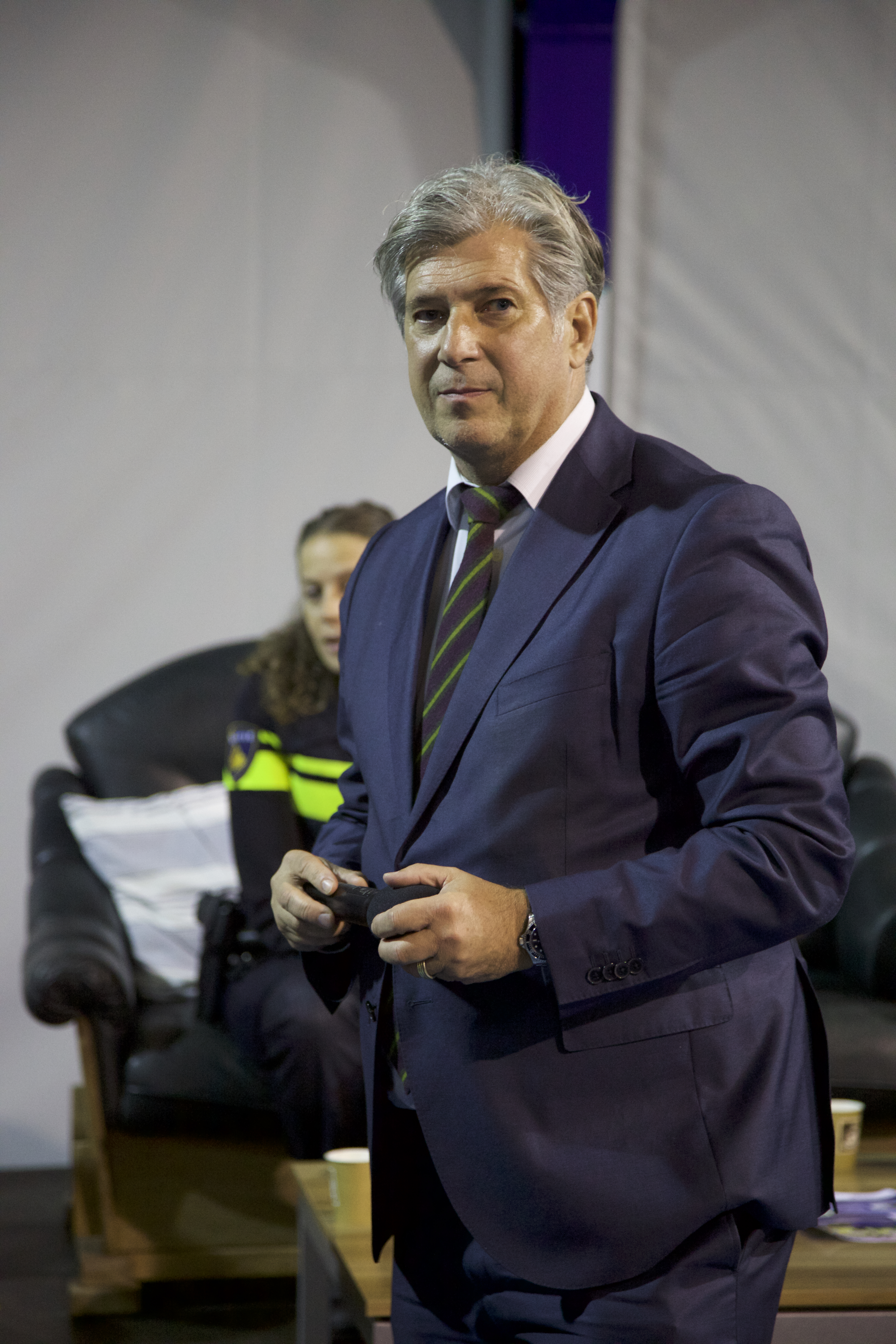

Peter Oskam (born 5 January 1960 in The Hague) is a Dutch politician and former football referee and judge. As a member of the Christian Democratic Appeal (CDA) he was an MP between 20 September 2012 and 4 January 2016.

As a referee he refereed 64 football games in the Eredivisie (Honorary Division) between 1998 and 2004. Oskam also officiated in UEFA Euro 2004 qualification, serving as fourth official for the qualifying match between the Faroe Islands and Germany. As a judge he was vice president of the court of Rotterdam and Amsterdam.

In November 2015 it was announced Oskam would leave the House of Representatives to become mayor of Capelle aan den IJssel per January 2016. He was sworn in as mayor on 4 January. He was replaced in the House by Mustafa Amhaouch.

Oskam is married, has four children, and lives in Rijswijk.
