= Zyad Jusić =

Bosnian-Dutch footballer

Personal information
- Date of birth: 29 February 1980 (age 46)
- Place of birth: Ljubovija, SFR Yugoslavia
- Position: Striker

Youth career
- 1998–2000: PSV

Senior career*
Years	Team	Apps	(Gls)
2000–2003	FC Eindhoven	66	(12)
2003	Dessel Sport		
- KFC Lille
2004–2006	Turnhout		
2006–2007	Capellen		
2007–2008	Verbroedering Geel		
2008–2009	KFC Lille		
2009–2012	KESK Leopoldsburg		
- * Club domestic league appearances and goals

Zyad Jusić (born 29 February 1980) is a Bosnian-Dutch former professional footballer who played as a striker.

== Early and personal life ==
Jusić was born in Ljubovija, then a part of SFR Yugoslavia, and he holds dual Bosnian-Dutch citizenship.

== Club career ==
After beginning as a youth player with PSV, Jusić began his senior career with FC Eindhoven, scoring 12 goals in 66 games over three seasons. Jusić later played in Belgium for a number of teams including Dessel, KFC Lille, Turnhout, Capellen and Geel.
