= Kenneth Cicilia =

Curaçao footballer

Personal information
- Full name: Kenneth Cicilia
- Date of birth: 26 December 1981 (age 44)
- Place of birth: Willemstad, Curaçao, Netherlands Antilles
- Position: Midfielder

Team information
- Current team: Brabantia

Youth career
- 1998–2000: PSV Eindhoven

Senior career*
Years	Team	Apps	(Gls)
2001–2004	Sparta Rotterdam	23	(2)
2004–2005	FC Haarlem	14	(0)
2005–2007	TOP Oss	37	(1)
2007–2010	KV Turnhout	35	(2)

International career^{‡}
2002–2004	Netherlands Antilles	3	(0)
2011	Curaçao	2	(0)
- * Club domestic league appearances and goals as of 17 July 2009 ‡ National team caps and goals as of 1 December 2009

Kenneth Cicilia (born 26 December 1981) is a Curaçao football player.

== Club career ==
Cicilia came through the youth ranks at PSV Eindhoven and started his professional played at Sparta Rotterdam in the Dutch Eredivisie. He later played for FC Haarlem and TOP Oss in the Dutch Eerste Divisie as well as a couple of seasons for KV Turnhout in Belgium.

He returned to amateur football in the Netherlands to play for VV UNA and Dijkse Boys. In June 2012 he moved to Brabantia.
