= Sparta Rotterdam =

Dutch association football club

- Full name: Sparta Rotterdam
- Nicknames: De Kasteelheren (The Castle Lords); De Rood-Witte Gladiatoren (The Red-White Gladiators)
- Founded: 1 April 1888; 138 years ago
- Stadium: Sparta Stadion
- Capacity: 11,026
- Chairman: Leo Ruijs
- Head coach: Rogier Meijer
- League: Eredivisie
- 2025–26: Eredivisie, 10th of 18
- Website: www.sparta-rotterdam.nl
Home colours	Away colours

Sparta Rotterdam (Dutch pronunciation: [ˈspɑrtaː ˌrɔtərˈdɑm]) is a Dutch professional football club based in Rotterdam. Established on 1 April 1888, Sparta Rotterdam is the oldest professional football team in the Netherlands.

Sparta currently competes in the Eredivisie, the top flight of Dutch professional football, which they have won six times, having earned promotion from the Eerste Divisie in 2018–19. The club is one of three professional football clubs from Rotterdam, the others being Excelsior (est. 1902) and Feyenoord (est. 1908).

== History ==
=== Origins ===
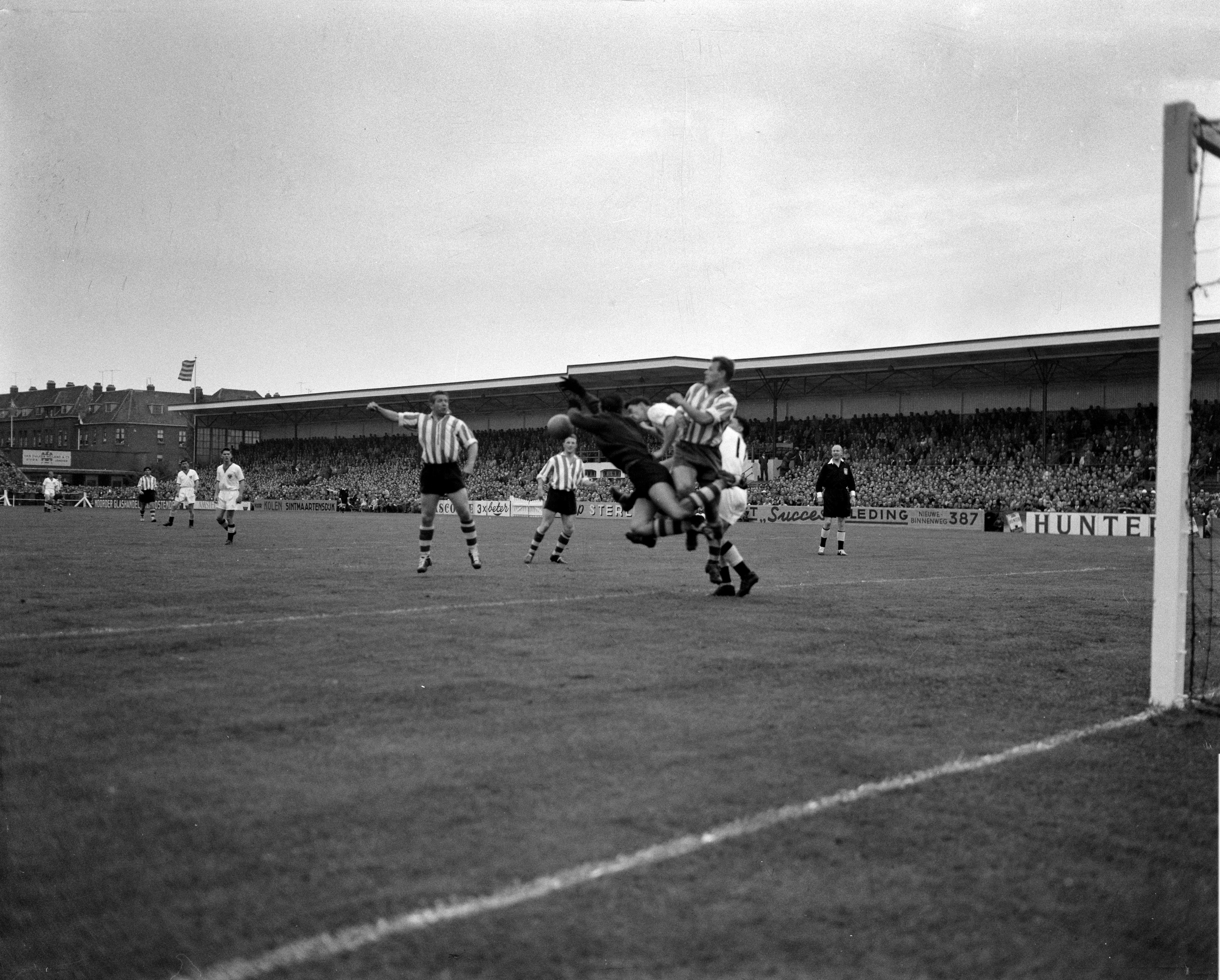
Sparta Rotterdam vs Blackpool F.C., August 1957

On the Easter Sunday of 1 April 1888, eight students from Rotterdam founded a cricket club called Rotterdamsche Cricket & Football Club Sparta. It was established in the garden of the house of the first treasurer, Hartevelt Hoos Oostvestple, a building located on the 11 in Rotterdam. The club was founded by eight students between the ages of 13 and 16. Five of them were students of the then HBS at the Van Alkemadeplein, and the remaining three were students of the Gymnasium Erasmianum on the Coolvest, the name of the Coolsingel before it changed in 1888. All the founders came from wealthy families in Rotterdam, because at the time, it was only the high and middle classes who had the time and money to practice sports, such as cricket. All the founders, along with the other early members of Sparta, lived in the Stadsdriehoek, Cool, Rubroek or Crooswijk neighborhoods of Rotterdam, which had become a fast-growing port city of the Netherlands in the second half of the 19th century.

Sparta initially started as a cricket club, with the Dutch newspaper NRC of May 1888 already reporting a victory for Sparta over Achilles by 45 runs. However, when the boys were given a suitable ball, they also engaged in the sport of football, which had recently come over from the United Kingdom. The young Sparta members began playing this sport in the terrain that was located on the Noordereiland, west of the Burgmeester Hoffmanplein, and in July 1888, a football branch of the club was thus established. In the Netherlands, it was Sparta who introduced the goal with a crossbar and nets. Before them, only a rope was stretched between the posts.

=== First matches ===
The members of Sparta only played matches against each other in the first year. These matches were played in various compositions between the 35-hour lesson week and the subsequent 20-hour working week at the Delftse Poort, usually on the square in front of the church of the Grote or Sint-Laurenskerk.

In 1888 there was not yet an umbrella organization for football, so there were no organized competitions. Therefore, the clubs had to invite or challenge each other, which resulted in a lot of mutual challenges between the existing clubs. The first football challenge that Sparta received dates back to 28 December 1888, more than 38 weeks after the foundation date, but the game, scheduled for 30 December 1888, was not played due to the unplayability of the opponent's field. From April 1889, the training and matches began to take place on a site designated by the alderman to the west of De Heuvel in Rotterdam. In the same period, the club also got its first clubhouse on the Delfshavensedijk.

=== Federal football ===
In March 1890, Sparta joined the Dutch Football and Athletics Association (Nederlandse Atletiek en Voetbal Bond, NVAB), founded by Pim Mulier on 8 December 1889, the predecessor of today's KNVB, and they played their first real match later that year. In 1892 Sparta disbanded the cricket branch. On 18 December 1892, Sparta defeated the Amersfoortsche FC (AFC Quick 1890) with what still is a record result for a Dutch league match: 17–0. The right winger Freek Kampschreur scored 9 of the 17 goals and is still the shared record holder for the most goals in a single Dutch league match. The next home match against Go Ahead from Wageningen is an important one as both teams have a shot at winning the 2nd division championship, and thus it attracted 1500 spectators. Sparta lost 2–4, which still is their only loss in the 2nd division, but then won the away game (0–2) in February, thus finishing the season with the same amount of points, and since there were no tie-breakers at the time, both teams were promoted to the highest league of Dutch football on 23 April 1893.

Earlier that same year, on 18 March 1893, Sparta was the first Dutch club to play a match against a foreign opponent, Harwich & Parkeston F.C. of England, whose football was much more developed, and they showed their clear superiority with a resounding 8–0 victory. When another match against an English team, Felixstowe FC, was scheduled for 5 February 1894, the NVAB, in order to avert another humiliation to Sparta, forced them to field a team that included a few non-Spartan players, and the plan worked as the game ended in a 1–1 draw. On the following day, 6 February, Felixstowe FC played another match, this time against a Dutch squad with the best players of the Netherlands, which fielded only two players from Sparta, Weinthal and Freek Kampschreur. They did no better than the Sparta squad as they lost 0–1, but this game is now considered to be the first unofficial match of the Netherlands national team.

In August 1893, Sparta debuted a new field on the Binnenweg which had a real fence and some seats. The players could even dress up and wash in a nearby house, but because it was continuously flooded, Sparta received permission from the municipality to move to the Schuttersveld in Crooswijk. There, they remained undefeated from January 1894 until the end of the season as they finished in fourth. Sparta then founded the Rotterdam Football Association in 1894.

=== Innovations ===
Sparta introduced women's football in late 1896 by trying to organize a competition between a women's team from Sparta and the English Ladies Football Club from London. However, no permission for this match was given by the Dutch Football Association, which forbids it from happening.

Sparta also showed itself to be an innovator in other areas during this period. Over the years, Sparta introduced in the Netherlands, among other things: the header, a goal with a crossbar and nets, and brightly colored shirts. That red and white outfit was copied in 1899 during a visit by the Sparta board to Sunderland in England. Apart from being an innovator, Sparta was also known as a club that was sometimes difficult to deal with. For instance, in March 1897, Sparta temporarily withdrew from the Dutch league because of the alleged continuous dubious arbitration of Sparta matches, but especially due to turmoil at a match in Amsterdam against the apparently rather arrogant RAP, in which the referee did not act against the verbal abuse of the RAP players. Sparta's remaining two matches were awarded to their opponents (5–0) and the club was fined 10 Dutch coins, but despite this, it still finished fourth.

In 1899 the board of Sparta visited a match of Sunderland. Impressed with the red-and-white jersey of the English club, the board decided that Sunderland's colours (red-white striped jersey, black shorts) would henceforth be the colours of Sparta. The first Sparta shirts were purchased second-hand Sunderland shirts. Today, the signature red and white shirt is combined with black trousers and red and white striped stockings.

=== First golden age ===
From 1900 Sparta played a pioneering role in the organization of Dutch football because, at the time, the board of the Dutch Football Association consisted largely of Spartans, and in 1901, Sparta began to organize competitions for the Zilveren Bal, the most important cup tournament at the time.

In 1905, Sparta initiated and organized the first home match of the Netherlands national team, against Belgium. The match, won 4–0 by the Netherlands, was a rematch of a game two weeks prior, when the Netherlands beat Belgium 4–1 in Antwerp, Belgium. The match took place in what had been the Sparta stadium for about ten years at the time, the Schuttersveld in Crooswijk, and the Dutch squad was coached by former Sparta player Cees van Hasselt.

From 1893 onwards, the football players of Sparta built up a reputation as "the eternal number 2" because, in its first fifteen years in the top division of Dutch football, Sparta reached second or third place six times. This changed in 1909, as Sparta won the national championship in that year as well as in 1911, 1912, 1913, and 1915; while the Silver Ball was won in 1910 and 1913, and the NBLO Cup in 1909, 1910, and 1911. During this period, Sparta hired a coach for the first time, the Englishman Edgar Chadwick, which undoubtedly contributed to the success. Star players Bok de Korver, Huug de Groot, and Cas Ruffelse also played a pivotal role in helping Sparta dominate the nation during these years.

On 15 October 1916, Sparta moved for the last time, this time to Sparta's new stadium, Het Kasteel (The Castle), in the Spangen area of west Rotterdam. The move was largely privately funded by a group of 27 residents of Rotterdam. Following the English example, the Sparta stadium became the center of the later-built residential area and was soon known as Het Kasteel because of its facade with two turrets. The stadium was renovated in 1999 and is still Sparta's stadium.

In 1918, Prince Hendrik was the first member of the Royal House to pay an official visit to a Sparta match. In the years that followed, Queen Wilhelmina, Princess Juliana, and Prince Bernhard also visited the stadium, among other things to attend the annual Blood Transfusion Competition, a charity initiative that earned Sparta a high award from the Dutch Red Cross on its golden jubilee.

=== Recent years ===
Until the 2002–03 season, Sparta had always played at the highest level, but after they appointed the former international player Frank Rijkaard as a manager they were relegated from the top-level Eredivisie in 2002. That made Rijkaard resign from his position. Sparta returned to the Eredivisie for the 2005–06 season. They were relegated again in 2010. On 20 August 2010, they equalled Ajax's and Heracles Almelo's Dutch league record win when they defeated Almere City 12–1 with Johan Voskamp scoring an Eerste Divisie record 8 goals on his debut.

After six years in the Eerste Divisie, Sparta again won promotion to the Eredivisie in April 2016 after a 3–1 win over Jong Ajax won them an unassailable lead over second placed VVV-Venlo. However, they were relegated for the third time in their history in May 2018 after they were beaten 1–3 on aggregate by FC Emmen in the promotion/relegation play-offs. The result proved to be a historical one since Emmen won their first ever promotion to the Eredivisie.

Sparta has won six national titles (1909, 1911, 1912, 1913, 1915 and 1959) and three national cups (1958, 1962 and 1966).

== Meuse/Scheldt Cup ==
The best footballers of Rotterdam and Antwerp contested a yearly match between 1909 and 1959 for the Meuse- and Scheldt Cup (Maas- en Schelde Beker). It was agreed to play the game at stadium Het Kasteel in Rotterdam and at the Bosuilstadion in Antwerp. The cup was provided in 1909 by Kees van Hasselt from Rotterdam and P. Havenith from Antwerp.

== Youth program ==
The Sparta Jeugdopleiding (English: Sparta Youth Academy) is a four-star certified youth academy and amongst the strongest in the nation, having won the national academy of the year award on several occasions. Several International footballers have progressed through the ranks of the academy, including Danny Blind, Danny Koevermans, David Mendes da Silva, Ed de Goey, Winston Bogarde, Memphis Depay, Henk Fräser, Jan van Beveren, Georginio Wijnaldum, Anwar El Ghazi, Jetro Willems, John de Wolf, Kevin Strootman, Rick van Drongelen and Nick Viergever, Marten de Roon amongst others.

== Honours ==
=== National ===
- Netherlands Football League Championship / Eredivisie: 6
  - 1908–09, 1910–11, 1911–12, 1912–13, 1914–15, 1958–59
- Eerste Divisie: 1
  - 2015–16
- KNVB Cup: 3
  - 1957–58, 1961–62, 1965–66

=== Others ===
- Rotterdam Easter Tournament
  - Runners-up (2): 1934, 1948

== Domestic results ==
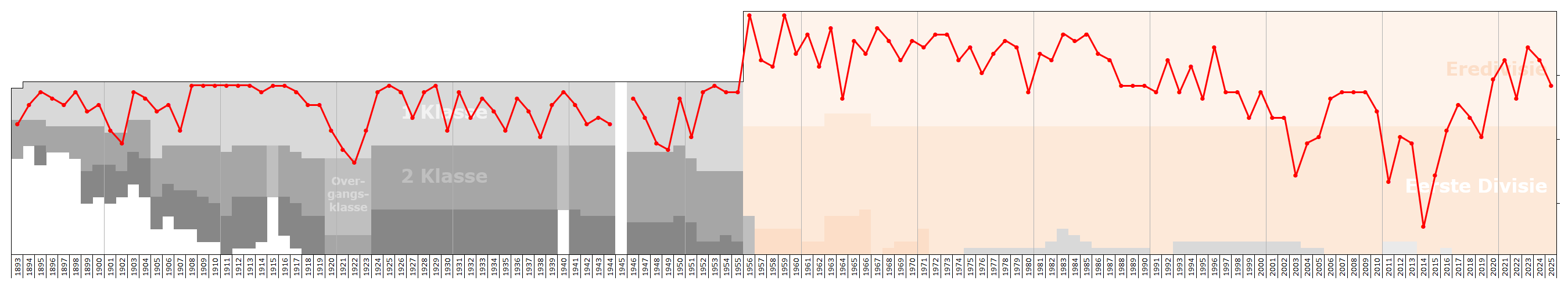
Historical chart of league performance

Below is a table with Sparta Rotterdam's domestic results since the introduction of the Eredivisie in 1956.

Domestic Results since 1956
Domestic league	League result	Qualification to	KNVB Cup season	Cup result
2024–25 Eredivisie	12th		2024–25	second round
2023–24 Eredivisie	8th	European competition play-offs: no European competition	2023–24	second round
2022–23 Eredivisie	6th	European competition play-offs: no European competition	2022–23	second round
2021–22 Eredivisie	14th		2021–22	second round
2020–21 Eredivisie	8th	European competition play-offs: no European competition	2020–21	first round
2019–20 Eredivisie	11th		2019–20	second round
2018–19 Eerste Divisie	second	Eredivisie (winning promotion/releg. play-offs)	2018–19	first round
2017–18 Eredivisie	17th	Eerste Divisie (losing promo./releg. play-offs)	2017–18	first round
2016–17 Eredivisie	15th		2016–17	semi-final
2015–16 Eerste Divisie	1st	Eredivisie	2015–16	third round
2014–15 Eerste Divisie	8th	-	2014–15	third round
2013–14 Eerste Divisie	16th	promotion/relegation play-offs: no promotion	2013–14	second round
2012–13 Eerste Divisie	3rd	promotion/relegation play-offs: no promotion	2012–13	third round
2011–12 Eerste Divisie	2nd	promotion/relegation play-offs: no promotion	2011–12	round of 16
2010–11 Eerste Divisie	9th	-	2010–11	third round
2009–10 Eredivisie	16th	Eerste Divisie (losing promo./releg. play-offs)	2009–10	quarter-final
2008–09 Eredivisie	13th	-	2008–09	round of 16
2007–08 Eredivisie	13th	-	2007–08	third round
2006–07 Eredivisie	13th	(after losing IC-play-offs)	2006–07	round of 16
2005–06 Eredivisie	14th	-	2005–06	second round
2004–05 Eerste Divisie	2nd	Eredivisie (winning promotion/releg. play-offs)	2004–05	second round
2003–04 Eerste Divisie	3rd	promotion/relegation play-offs: no promotion	2003–04	semi-final
2002–03 Eerste Divisie	8th	-	2002–03	third round
2001–02 Eredivisie	17th	Eerste Divisie (losing promo./releg. play-offs)	2001–02	second round
2000–01 Eredivisie	17th	(surviving promotion/relegation play-offs)	2000–01	third round
1999–2000 Eredivisie	13th	-	1999-2000	second round
1998–99 Eredivisie	17th	(surviving promotion/relegation play-offs)	1998-99	second round
1997–98 Eredivisie	13th	-	1997-98	second round
1996–97 Eredivisie	13th	-	1996-97	second round
1995–96 Eredivisie	6th	-	1995-96	final
1994–95 Eredivisie	14th	-	1994-95	round of 16
1993–94 Eredivisie	9th	-	1993-94	third round
1992–93 Eredivisie	13th	-	1992-93	round of 16
1991–92 Eredivisie	8th	-	1991-92	semi-final
1990–91 Eredivisie	13th	-	1990-91	round of 16
1989–90 Eredivisie	12th	-	1989-90	first round
1988–89 Eredivisie	12th	-	1988-89	round of 16
1987–88 Eredivisie	12th	-	1987-88	first round
1986–87 Eredivisie	8th	-	1986-87	round of 16
1985–86 Eredivisie	7th	-	1985-86	first round
1984–85 Eredivisie	4th	UEFA Cup	1984-85	quarter-final
1983–84 Eredivisie	5th	-	1983-84	round of 16
1982–83 Eredivisie	4th	UEFA Cup	1982-83	second round
1981–82 Eredivisie	8th	-	1981-82	semi-final
1980–81 Eredivisie	7th	-	1980-81	second round
1979–80 Eredivisie	13th	-	1979-80	semi-final
1978–79 Eredivisie	6th	-	1978-79	quarter-final
1977–78 Eredivisie	5th	-	1977-78	semi-final
1976–77 Eredivisie	7th	-	1976-77	second round
1975–76 Eredivisie	10th	-	1975-76	second round
1974–75 Eredivisie	6th	-	1974-75	quarter-final
1973–74 Eredivisie	8th	-	1973-74	round of 16
1972–73 Eredivisie	4th	-	1972-73	semi-final
1971–72 Eredivisie	4th	-	1971-72	quarter-final
1970–71 Eredivisie	6th	Cup Winners' Cup	1970-71	final
1969–70 Eredivisie	5th	Inter-Cities Fairs Cup	1969-70	second round
1968–69 Eredivisie	8th	-	1968-69	semi-final
1967–68 Eredivisie	5th	-	1967-68	quarter-final
1966–67 Eredivisie	3rd	-	1966-67	round of 16
1965–66 Eredivisie	7th	Cup Winners' Cup	1965-66	winners
1964–65 Eredivisie	5th	-	1964-65	first round
1963–64 Eredivisie	14th	-	1963-64	round of 16
1962–63 Eredivisie	3rd	-	1962-63	third round
1961–62 Eredivisie	9th	Cup Winners' Cup	1961-62	winners
1960–61 Eredivisie	4th	-	1960-61	?
1959–60 Eredivisie	7th	-	not held	not held
1958–59 Eredivisie	1st	European Cup	1958-59	?
1957–58 Eredivisie	9th	-	1957-58	winners
1956–57 Eredivisie	8th	-	1956-57	?

== Sparta in Europe ==
Season	Round	Opponent	Home	Away	Aggregate
1959–60 European Cup	1st round	(Sweden) IFK Göteborg	4–0	1–3	4–4 (Note: Sparta won 3–1 in the replay played in Bremen, Germany.) (3–1 (replay, a.e.t.))
1959–60 European Cup	Quarter finals	(Scotland) Rangers F.C.	2–3	1–0	3–3 (Note: Rangers won 3–2 in the replay played in London, England.) (3–2 (replay, a.e.t.))
1962–63 Cup Winners' Cup	1st round	(Switzerland) FC Lausanne-Sport	4–2	0–3	4–5
1966–67 Cup Winners' Cup	1st round	(Malta) Floriana F.C.	6–0	1–1	7–1
1966–67 Cup Winners' Cup	2nd round	(Switzerland) Servette FC	1–0	0–2	1–2
1970–71 Inter-Cities Fairs Cup	1st round	(Iceland) Íþróttabandalag Akraness	6–0	9–0	15–0
1970–71 Inter-Cities Fairs Cup	2nd round	(Northern Ireland) Coleraine F.C.	2–0	2–1	4–1
1970–71 Inter-Cities Fairs Cup	Quarter final	(Germany) FC Bayern Munich	1–3	1–2	2–5
1971–72 Cup Winners' Cup	1st round	(Bulgaria) PFC Levski Sofia	2–0	1–1	3–1
1971–72 Cup Winners' Cup	2nd round	(Socialist Federal Republic of Yugoslavia) Red Star Belgrade	1–1	1–2	2–3
1983–84 UEFA Cup	1st round	(Northern Ireland) Coleraine F.C.	4–0	1–1	5–1
1983–84 UEFA Cup	2nd round	(East Germany) FC Carl Zeiss Jena	3–2	1–1	4–3
1983–84 UEFA Cup	3rd round	(Soviet Union) FC Spartak Moscow	1–1	0–2	1–3
1985–86 UEFA Cup	1st round	(Germany) Hamburger SV	2–0	0–2	2–2 (4–3 p)
1985–86 UEFA Cup	2nd round	(Germany) Borussia Mönchengladbach	1–1	1–5	2–6

== Current squad ==
As of 10 September 2026

Note: Flags indicate national team as defined under FIFA eligibility rules; some limited exceptions apply. Players may hold more than one non-FIFA nationality.

No.	Pos.	Nation	Player
—	GK	POL	Filip Bednarek
—	GK	NED	Michael Brouwer
—	GK	NED	Pascal Kuiper
—	DF	NED	Bas Kuipers
—	DF	NED	Max de Ligt
—	DF	NED	Lushendry Martes
—	DF	NED	Bruno Martins Indi
—	DF	VEN	Teo Quintero
—	DF	NED	Boyd Reith
—	DF	NED	Nick Verschuren
—	DF	NED	Giannino Vianello
—	DF	NED	Marvin Young

No.	Pos.	Nation	Player
—	MF	NED	Julian Baas
—	MF	NED	Isaac Babadi (on loan from PSV)
—	MF	NED	Robin van Cruijsen
—	MF	NED	Cedric Hatenboer
—	MF	JPN	Shunsuke Mito
—	MF	NOR	Alwande Roaldsøy
—	MF	NED	Jens Toornstra
—	FW	NED	Mitchell van Bergen
—	FW	NED	Joel Ideho
—	FW	MNE	Andrej Kostić (on loan from AC Milan)
—	FW	FIN	Casper Terho
—	FW	NED	Milan Zonneveld

=== Out on loan ===
Note: Flags indicate national team as defined under FIFA eligibility rules; some limited exceptions apply. Players may hold more than one non-FIFA nationality.

No.	Pos.	Nation	Player
—	MF	NED	Younes Jaber el Meftahi (at Volendam until 30 June 2027)
—	MF	NED	Mike Kleijn (at Volendam until 30 June 2027)

No.	Pos.	Nation	Player
—	FW	ISL	Nökkvi Þeyr Þórisson (at Telstar until 30 June 2027)

=== Jong Sparta Rotterdam ===
Jong Sparta Rotterdam is the second team of Sparta Rotterdam, consisting mainly of players who are not yet eligible for a spot in the first team's squad. The team has been competing in the third-tier Tweede Divisie since 2016. Previously, it played in the Beloften Eredivisie.

Note: Flags indicate national team as defined under FIFA eligibility rules; some limited exceptions apply. Players may hold more than one non-FIFA nationality.

No.	Pos.	Nation	Player
—	GK	NED	Duncan Lindhout
—	GK	NED	Rik Suur
—	GK	NED	Thijs Verbaan
—	DF	NED	Joshua Bogerd
—	DF	NED	Timo Borrie
—	DF	NED	Justice Esser
—	DF	NED	Djomar Giersthove
—	DF	NED	Moreno Gompel
—	DF	MAR	Diyae Jermoumi
—	DF	NED	Brent Leerdam
—	MF	NED	Viggo Guit
—	MF	NED	Daniël Hanzen

No.	Pos.	Nation	Player
—	MF	NED	Santi Laguna Burgos
—	MF	NED	Noah Sandvliet
—	MF	NED	Mohamed Oukhattou
—	MF	NED	Liam Oetoehganal
—	FW	ESP	Gustav Arcos Sundqvist
—	FW	NED	Shedrach Ebite
—	FW	NED	Egeron Gorisson
—	FW	NED	Jason Inocencio
—	FW	NED	Luc Nieuwenhuijs
—	FW	NED	Kenji Sallent
—	FW	NED	Marlon Silva Neves

== Former players ==
=== National team players ===
The following players were called up to represent their national teams in international football and received caps during their tenure with Sparta Rotterdam:

- Aruba
  - (Aruba) David Abdul (2008–2011)
  - (Aruba) Gregor Breinburg (2018–2019)
  Australia
  - (Australia) James Holland (2011–2012)
  Austria
  - (Austria) Wilhelm Kreuz (1972–1974)
  Burkina Faso
  - (Burkina Faso) Ousmane Sanou (2001–2003)
  Canada
  - (Canada) Charles-Andreas Brym (2022–2024)
  Cape Verde
  - (Cape Verde) Lorenzo Fonseca (2019–2021)
  - (Cape Verde) Jeffry Fortes (2020–2021)
  - (Cape Verde) Cecílio Lopes (2007–2008)
  - (Cape Verde) Rui Monteiro (2000–2003)
  - (Cape Verde) Ayoni Santos (2025–2026)
  - (Cape Verde) Toni Varela (2011–2013)
  Comoros
  - (Comoros) Saïd Bakari (2023–2026)
  Curaçao
  - (Curaçao) Suently Alberto (2020–2022)
  - (Curaçao) Kenneth Cicilia (2001–2004) (Note: A Curaçao-born footballer, Kenneth Cicilia represented Netherlands Antilles internationally, prior to the countries dissolution in 2010, with Curaçao considered by both UEFA and FIFA as the only inherit successor to the national team of former Netherlands Antilles.)
  - (Curaçao) Bradley Martis (2018–2020) (Note: Born in the Netherlands, Bradley Martis represented Curaçao internationally, before opting to pry his craft for the national team of Aruba. As a Sparta player he was capped by the national team of Curaçao.)
  - (Curaçao) Jeremy de Nooijer (2012–2015)
  - (Curaçao) Rayvien Rosario (2023–2024)
  - (Curaçao) Shurandy Sambo (2025–2026)
  Denmark
  - (Denmark) Jørgen Kristensen (1968–1972)
  - (Denmark) Claus Larsen (1975–1976)
  - (Denmark) Ole Madsen (1965–1968)
  Finland
  - (Finland) Janne Saksela (2017)
  Ghana
  - (Ghana) Anthony Obodai (2003–2005)
  Guinea
  - (Guinea) Mathias Pogba (2016–2017)
- Hungary
  - (Hungary) Krisztián Vermes (2008–2009)
  Iceland
  - (Iceland) Kristian Hlynsson (2025)
  Israel
  - (Israel) Ariel Harush (2019–2020)
  Japan
  - (Japan) **Shunsuke Mito (2024–present)**
  Luxembourg
  - (Luxembourg) Laurent Jans (2021–2022)
  - (Luxembourg) Mica Pinto (2020–2023)
  Morocco
  - (Morocco) Nourdin Boukhari (2000–2002; 2007–2008; 2014)
  - (Morocco) Mourad Mghizrat (1996–1999)
  Netherlands
  - (Netherlands) Luuk Balkestein (1974–1980)
  - (Netherlands) Jan van Beveren (1965–1970)
  - (Netherlands) Danny Blind (1979–1986)
  - (Netherlands) Willem Boerdam (1908–1921)
  - (Netherlands) Rein Boomsma (1895–1907)
  - (Netherlands) Tinus Bosselaar (1953–1954; 1956–1966)
  - (Netherlands) Pim Doesburg (1962–1967; 1970–1980)
  - (Netherlands) Daaf Drok (1939–1944)
  - (Netherlands) Tonny van Ede (1947–1964)
  - (Netherlands) Hans Eijkenbroek (1963–1973)
  - (Netherlands) Jo Eshuijs (1904–1909)
  - (Netherlands) Ok Formenoij (1924–1933)
  - (Netherlands) Huug de Groot (1908–1917)
  - (Netherlands) Herman Jurgens (1903–1908)
  - (Netherlands) Jan Klijnjan (1968–1973)
  - (Netherlands) Bok de Korver (1902–1923)
  - (Netherlands) Wim Landman (1949–1953)
  - (Netherlands) Theo Laseroms (1963–1967)
  - (Netherlands) Wim Meutstege (1973–1977)
  - (Netherlands) Kees van Nieuwenhuizen (1908–1911)
  - (Netherlands) Jan Oosthoek (1924)
  - (Netherlands) Miel Pijs (1967–1969)
  - (Netherlands) Cas Ruffelse (1907–1926)
- **Netherlands** (continued)
  - (Netherlands) Henk Steeman (1919–1922; 1923–1925)
  - (Netherlands) Rinus Terlouw (1948–1958)
  - (Netherlands) John Veldman (1991–1996)
  - (Netherlands) Hans Venneker (1968–1975)
  - (Netherlands) Piet de Vries (1956–1965)
  - (Netherlands) Jaap Weber (1925–1929)
  - (Netherlands) Piet van der Wolk (1908–1921)
  - (Netherlands) Willy van Zwieteren (1921–1933)
  Nigeria
  - (Nigeria) Dele Adeleye (2007–2010)
  - (Nigeria) Sani Kaita (2005–2008)
  - (Nigeria) Christopher Kanu (2002)
  - (Nigeria) Maduka Okoye (2020–2022)
  Northern Ireland
  - (Northern Ireland) Johnny Crossan (1959–1961)
  - (Northern Ireland) Sammy Morgan (1978–1979)
  Republic of Ireland
  - (Republic of Ireland) Peter Fitzgerald (1959–1960)
  Slovenia
  - (Slovenia) Aleksander Šeliga (2009–2011)
- Somalia
  - (Somalia) Abdulsamed Abdullahi (2018–2019)
- South Africa
  - (South Africa) Lars Veldwijk (2018–2020)
  Suriname
  - (Suriname) Ishan Kort (2021–2023)
  - (Suriname) Djevencio van der Kust (2023–2025)
  Syria
  - (Syria) Mohammed Osman (2021–2022)
  Tunisia
  - (Tunisia) Sayfallah Ltaief (2025–2026)
  Trinidad & Tobago
  - (Trinidad and Tobago) Darryl Roberts (2007–2008)
  United States
  - (United States) Gregg Berhalter (1996–1998)
  Venezuela
  - (Venezuela) **Teo Quintero (2024–present)**

- Players in bold actively play for Sparta Rotterdam and for their respective national teams. Years in brackets indicate careerspan with Sparta.

=== National team players by Confederation ===
Member associations are listed in order of most to least amount of current and former Sparta players represented Internationally

Total national team players by confederation
Confederation	Total	(Nation) Association
AFC	3	Australia (1), Japan (1), Syria (1)
CAF	19	Cape Verde (6), Nigeria (4), Morocco (2), Burkina Faso (1), Comoros (1), Ghana (1), Guinea (1), Somalia (1), South Africa (1), Tunisia (1)
CONCACAF	13	Curaçao (6), Aruba (2), Suriname (2), Canada (1), (Trinidad and Tobago) Trinidad & Tobago (1), United States (1)
CONMEBOL	1	Venezuela (1)
OFC	0	
UEFA	45	Netherlands (31), Denmark (3), Luxembourg (2), Northern Ireland (2), Austria (1), Finland (1), Hungary (1), Iceland (1), (Republic of Ireland) Ireland (1), Israel (1), Slovenia (1)

== Players in international tournaments ==
The following is a list of Sparta players who have competed in international tournaments, including the FIFA World Cup, UEFA European Championship, CONCACAF Gold Cup and the Africa Cup of Nations. To this date no Sparta players have participated in the FIFA Confederations Cup, AFC Asian Cup, Copa América or the OFC Nations Cup while playing for Sparta Rotterdam.

Cup	Players
(Socialist Federal Republic of Yugoslavia) UEFA Euro 1976	(Netherlands) Wim Meutstege
(Argentina) 1978 FIFA World Cup	(Netherlands) Pim Doesburg
(Italy) UEFA Euro 1980	(Netherlands) Pim Doesburg
(England) UEFA Euro 1996	(Netherlands) John Veldman
(United States) 1998 CONCACAF Gold Cup	(United States) Gregg Berhalter
(Mali) 2002 Africa Cup of Nations	(Morocco) Nourdin Boukhari
(Egypt) 2006 Africa Cup of Nations	(Nigeria) Sani Kaita
(United States) 2007 CONCACAF Gold Cup	(Trinidad and Tobago) Darryl Roberts
(South Africa) 2010 FIFA World Cup	(Nigeria) Dele Adeleye (Slovenia) Aleksander Šeliga
(South Africa) 2013 Africa Cup of Nations	(Cape Verde) Toni Varela
(Egypt) 2019 Africa Cup of Nations	(South Africa) Lars Veldwijk
(Cameroon) 2021 Africa Cup of Nations	(Nigeria) Maduka Okoye
(Morocco) 2025 Africa Cup of Nations	(Comoros) Saïd Bakari
(Canada) (Mexico) (United States) 2026 FIFA World Cup	(Curaçao) Shurandy Sambo

== Club staff ==
Position	Name
Head coach	(Netherlands) Maurice Steijn
Assistant coach	(Morocco) Nourdin Boukhari
Goalkeeping coach	(Netherlands) Frank Kooiman
Video analyst	(Netherlands) Wesly Lisboa
Chief scout	(Netherlands) Jesper Gudde
Scout	(Netherlands) Bart Latuheru
Club doctor	(Netherlands) Simon Knops
Physiotherapist	(Netherlands) Rogier Hoek (Japan) Kohei Sagara
Team Official	(Netherlands) Ronald Hanstede
Kit Manager	(Netherlands) Ben Wessels
Academy manager	(Netherlands) Jason Oost
Technical director	(Netherlands) Gerard Nijkamp

== Former coaches ==
- Edgar Chadwick (1915)
- Peter Donaghy (1929–30)
- Doug Livingstone (1949)
- Walter Crook (1950)
- Denis Neville (1955–63)
- Bill Thompson (1963–66)
- Wiel Coerver (1966–69)
- Georg Keßler (1970–71)
- Elek Schwartz (1971–72)
- Jimmy Adamson (1976)
- Cor Brom (1976–78)
- Mircea Petescu (1978–80)
- Joop Brand (1980)
- Barry Hughes (1980–83)
- Bert Jacobs (1983–84)
- Theo Vonk (1984–86)
- Barry Hughes (1986–88)
- Rob Baan (1988–90)
- Rob Jacobs (1991–93)
- Han Berger (1993–95)
- Henk van Stee (1995)
- Henk ten Cate (1995–97)
- Hans van der Zee (1997–98)
- Jan Everse (1998–99)
- Dolf Roks (1999–01)
- Willem van Hanegem (2001)
- Frank Rijkaard (2001–02)
- Fritz Korbach (2003)
- Chris Dekker (2003)
- Mike Snoei (2003–05)
- Adri van Tiggelen (interim) (2005)
- Wiljan Vloet (2005–07)
- Gert Aandewiel (2007)
- Adri van Tiggelen (interim) (2007)
- Foeke Booy (2007–09)
- Frans Adelaar (2009–10)
- Aad de Mos (2010)
- Jan Everse (2010–11)
- Jos van Eck (2011)
- Michel Vonk (2011–13)
- Henk ten Cate (interim) (2013)
- Gert Kruys (2014)
- Alex Pastoor (2015–2017)
- Dolf Roks (interim) (2017)
- Dick Advocaat (2018)
- Henk Fraser (2018–2022)
- Maurice Steijn (2022–2023)
- Jeroen Rijsdijk (2023–2024)
- Maurice Steijn (2024–2025)
- Alex Muslic (2025-Present)

== See also ==
- Sparta Rotterdam season 2001–02
- Sparta Rotterdam season 2002–03
- Sparta Rotterdam season 2003–04
