= 2010–11 AFC Ajax season =

Dutch football club season

Ajax
2010–11 season
- Chairman: Uri Coronel
- Manager: Martin Jol (until 6 December 2010); Frank de Boer
- Eredivisie: 1st
- KNVB Cup: Runners-up
- Champions League: Group stage
- Europa League: Round of 16
- Johan Cruyff Shield: Runners-up
- Top goalscorer: League: Mounir El Hamdaoui (13 goals); All: Mounir El Hamdaoui (19 goals)
- Average home league attendance: 47,316
Home colours	Away colours

The 2010–11 season was AFC Ajax in the Eredivisie. They participated in the Champions League and Europa League. The first training of the new season took place on Sunday, 27 June 2010. The traditional AFC Ajax Open Day was held on Friday, 23 July 2010.

== Pre-season ==
In preparation for the new season, Ajax organized a trainings stage in Stubaital, Austria, from 5 to 11 July. During the training camp, friendly matches were played against Al-Ahly and Rapid București, while further practice matches were played against Ajax (amateurs), FC Horst, Porto, Rijnsburgse Boys and Chelsea.

== Player statistics ==
Appearances for competitive matches only

No.	Pos	Nat	Player	Total		Eredivisie		UEFA Champions League UEFA Europa League		KNVB Cup Johan Cruijff-schaal XV	
No.	Pos	Nat	Player	Apps	Goals	Apps	Goals	Apps	Goals	Apps	Goals
1	GK	(Netherlands) NED	Maarten Stekelenburg	44	0	26	0	13	0	5	0
2	DF	(Netherlands) NED	Gregory van der Wiel	52	1	32	1	14	0	6	0
3	DF	(Belgium) BEL	Toby Alderweireld	43	5	26	2	12	3	5	0
4	DF	(Belgium) BEL	Jan Vertonghen	51	8	32	6	13	1	6	1
5	DF	(Netherlands) NED	Vurnon Anita	46	4	27+4	3	9+1	0	3+2	1
6	MF	(Cameroon) CMR	Eyong Enoh	45	1	23+4	1	12+1	0	4+1	0
7	FW	(Serbia) SRB	Miralem Sulejmani	53	13	22+10	8	9+5	2	6+1	3
8	MF	(Denmark) DEN	Christian Eriksen	47	8	21+7	6	6+6	1	5+2	1
9	FW	(Morocco) MAR	Mounir El Hamdaoui	38	19	25+1	13	9+1	3	2	3
10	MF	(Netherlands) NED	Siem de Jong	52	17	31+1	12	12+1	2	7	3
12	GK	(Netherlands) NED	Kenneth Vermeer	7	0	6	0	0	0	1	0
13	DF	(Netherlands) NED	André Ooijer	18	1	8+5	1	2+1	0	1+1	0
15	MF	(Uruguay) URU	Nicolás Lodeiro	0	0	0	0	0	0	0	0
17	DF	(Netherlands) NED	Daley Blind	18	0	8+2	0	4	0	2+2	0
18	MF	(Sweden) SWE	Rasmus Lindgren	26	2	7+8	1	4+4	1	1+2	0
20	MF	(Netherlands) NED	Demy de Zeeuw	47	5	19+8	1	10+3	2	7	2
21	FW	(South Korea) KOR	Suk Hyun-jun	1	0	0	0	0	0	1	0
22	DF	(Uruguay) URU	Bruno Silva	0	0	0	0	0	0	0	0
23	DF	(Spain) ESP	Oleguer	9	1	2+1	1	1+3	0	2	0
27	FW	(Argentina) ARG	Darío Cvitanich	8	0	1+5	0	0+1	0	0+1	0
28	MF	(Netherlands) NED	Roly Bonevacia	2	0	1	0	0	0	1	0
29	DF	(Cameroon) CMR	Timothée Atouba	0	0	0	0	0	0	0	0
30	GK	(Netherlands) NED	Jeroen Verhoeven	6	0	2+1	0	1+1	0	1	0
32	MF	(Denmark) DEN	Nicolai Boilesen	7	0	5+1	0	0	0	1	0
33	FW	(Armenia) ARM	Aras Özbiliz	19	1	3+11	1	0+2	0	0+3	0
36	GK	(Netherlands) NED	Ronald Graafland	0	0	0	0	0	0	0	0
37	FW	(Democratic Republic of the Congo) COD	Jody Lukoki	2	0	0+2	0	0	0	0	0
41	FW	(Netherlands) NED	Lorenzo Ebecilio	24	5	14+2	3	4	0	4	2
42	FW	(Netherlands) NED	Geoffrey Castillion	1	0	0+1	0	0	0	0	0
46	FW	(Netherlands) NED	Florian Jozefzoon	5	1	0+4	0	0	0	1	1
Players sold or loaned out after the start of the season:
11	MF	(Netherlands) NED	Urby Emanuelson	32	2	17+1	1	10	0	3+1	1
16	FW	(Uruguay) URU	Luis Suárez	24	12	13	7	9	4	2	1
19	MF	(Finland) FIN	Teemu Tainio	5	0	1+1	0	0+2	0	0+1	0
22	MF	(Morocco) MAR	Ismaïl Aissati	2	0	1+1	0	0	0	0	0
24	MF	(Netherlands) NED	Marvin Zeegelaar	2	0	0+2	0	0	0	0	0
26	MF	(Netherlands) NED	Jeffrey Sarpong	1	0	0	0	0+1	0	0	0
35	FW	(Egypt) EGY	Mido	6	3	1+4	2	0	0	0+1	1

Updated 15 May 2011

=== 2010–11 selection by nationality ===
Nationality	(Netherlands)	(Belgium)	(Denmark)	(Uruguay)	(Cameroon)	(Morocco)	(Argentina)	(Armenia)	(Serbia)	(South Korea)	(Spain)	(Sweden)	(Democratic Republic of the Congo)	Total Players
Current squad selection	10	2	2	2	1	1	1	1	1	1	1	1	-	24
Youth/reserves squad in AFC Ajax selection	9	-	-	-	1	-	-	-	-	-	-	-	1	11
Players out on loan	4	-	-	-	-	1	-	-	-	-	-	-	-	5

== Team statistics ==
=== Eredivisie standings 2010–11 ===
Standing	Matches played	Wins	Draws	Losses	Points	Goals for	Goals against	Yellow cards (yellow card)	Red cards (red card)
1	34	22	7	5	73	72	30	55	3

==== Points by match day ====
Match day	1	2	3	4	5	6	7	8	9	10	11	12	13	14	15	16	17	18	19	20	21	22	23	24	25	26	27	28	29	30	31	32	33	34	Total
Points	1	3	3	3	3	3	1	0	3	1	3	3	0	0	1	3	1	3	3	0	3	3	1	3	1	3	3	0	3	3	3	3	3	3	73

==== Total points by match day ====
Match day	1	2	3	4	5	6	7	8	9	10	11	12	13	14	15	16	17	18	19	20	21	22	23	24	25	26	27	28	29	30	31	32	33	34	Total
Points	1	4	7	10	13	16	17	17	20	21	24	27	27	27	28	31	32	35	38	38	41	44	45	48	49	52	55	55	58	61	64	67	70	73	73

==== Standing by match day ====
Match day	1	2	3	4	5	6	7	8	9	10	11	12	13	14	15	16	17	18	19	20	21	22	23	24	25	26	27	28	29	30	31	32	33	34	Standing
Standing	7th	3rd	3rd	1st	2nd	1st	1st	1st	2nd	3rd	3rd	3rd	3rd	3rd	3rd	4th	4th	3rd	3rd	3rd	3rd	3rd	3rd	3rd	3rd	3rd	3rd	3rd	3rd	3rd	3rd	2nd	2nd	1st	1st

==== Goals by match day ====
Match day	1	2	3	4	5	6	7	8	9	10	11	12	13	14	15	16	17	18	19	20	21	22	23	24	25	26	27	28	29	30	31	32	33	34	Total
Goals	2	4	3	5	2	2	2	1	3	2	3	4	0	0	0	2	1	1	2	0	3	2	2	1	0	4	3	2	3	2	2	4	2	3	72

=== Statistics for the 2010–11 season ===
- This is an overview of all the statistics for played matches in the 2010–11 season.

	Friendlies	Johan Cruijff Schaal	KNVB Cup	UEFA Champions League	UEFA Europa League	Eredivisie	Total
Matches	12 of 12	1 of 1	6 of 6	10 of 10	4 of 4	34 of 34	67 of 67
Win	8 of 12	0 of 1	5 of 6	3 of 10	2 of 4	22 of 34	40 of 67
Draw	1 of 12	0 of 1	0 of 6	4 of 10	0 of 4	7 of 34	12 of 67
Loss	2 of 12	1 of 1	1 of 6	3 of 10	2 of 4	5 of 34	14 of 67
Home	1 of 2	1 of 1	5 of 5	5 of 5	2 of 2	17 of 17	32 of 32
Away	10 of 10	0 of 0	1 of 1	5 of 5	2 of 2	17 of 17	35 of 35
Yellow cards (yellow card)	5	2	10	19	6	55	97
Red cards (red card)	1	1	0	1	0	3	6
2 x yellow in 1 match (yellow card) (yellow-red card)	0	1	0	0	0	0	1
Number of substitutes used (substituted on) (substituted off)	59	3	15	23	10	87	193
Goals for	48	0	20	13	5	72	157
Goals against	10	1	5	16	4	30	66
Balance	+38	-1	+15	-3	+1	+42	+91
Clean sheets	3	0	3	1	2	15	24
Penalties for	1	0	2	0	0	4	7
Penalties against	1	0	0	3	1	2	7

=== 2010–11 team records ===
Description	Competition	Result
Biggest win	(Netherlands) Friendly match	FC Horst–AFC Ajax ( 1–21 )
Biggest win	(Netherlands) KNVB Cup	AFC Ajax–RKC Waalwijk ( 5–1 )
Biggest win	(European Union) UEFA Champions League	AC Milan–AFC Ajax ( 0–2 )
Biggest win	(European Union) UEFA Europa League	RSC Anderlecht–AFC Ajax ( 0–3 )
Biggest win	(Netherlands) Eredivisie	De Graafschap–AFC Ajax ( 0–5 )
Biggest loss	(Germany) Friendly match	Hamburger SV–AFC Ajax ( 4–2 )
Biggest loss	(Netherlands) KNVB Cup	FC Twente–AFC Ajax ( 3–2 )
Biggest loss	(European Union) UEFA Champions League	AFC Ajax–Real Madrid ( 0–4 )
Biggest loss	(European Union) UEFA Europa League	Spartak Moskva–AFC Ajax ( 3–0 )
Biggest loss	(Netherlands) Eredivisie	FC Utrecht–AFC Ajax ( 3–0 )
Most goals in a match	(Netherlands) Friendly match	FC Horst–AFC Ajax ( 1–21 )
Most goals in a match	(Netherlands) KNVB Cup	AFC Ajax–RKC Waalwijk ( 5–1 )
Most goals in a match	(European Union) UEFA Champions League	PAOK FC–AFC Ajax ( 3–3 )
Most goals in a match	(European Union) UEFA Europa League	RSC Anderlecht–AFC Ajax ( 0–3 )
Most goals in a match	(Netherlands) Eredivisie	AFC Ajax–Vitesse ( 4–2 )

==== Topscorers ====
Friendlies

Nr.	Name	Goal
1.	(Netherlands) Siem de Jong	9
2.	(Serbia) Miralem Sulejmani	7
3.	(South Korea) Suk Hyun-jun	5
4.	(Argentina) Darío Cvitanich	3
5.
5.	(Netherlands) Jeffrey Sarpong	2
5.	(Netherlands) Mitchell Donald	2
5.	(Armenia) Aras Özbiliz	2
5.	(Morocco) Ismaïl Aissati	2
5.	(Croatia) Darko Bodul	2
5.	(Denmark) Christian Eriksen	2
5.	(Uruguay) Luis Suárez	2
5.	(Netherlands) Lorenzo Ebecilio	2
12.
12.	(South Africa) Daylon Claasen	1
12.	(Belgium) Toby Alderweireld	1
12.	(Cameroon) Eyong Enoh	1
12.	(Netherlands) Urby Emanuelson	1
12.	(Netherlands) Johan Kappelhof	1
12.	(Netherlands) Marvin Zeegelaar	1
12.	(Netherlands) Demy de Zeeuw	1
12.	(Netherlands) Vurnon Anita	1
Total		48

Eredivisie

Nr.	Name	Goal
1.	(Morocco) Mounir El Hamdaoui	13
2.	(Netherlands) Siem de Jong	12
3.	(Serbia) Miralem Sulejmani	8
4.	(Uruguay) Luis Suárez	7
5.	(Belgium) Jan Vertonghen	6
5.	(Denmark) Christian Eriksen	6
7.	(Netherlands) Vurnon Anita	3
7.	(Netherlands) Lorenzo Ebecilio	3
9.	(Egypt) Mido	2
9.	(Belgium) Toby Alderweireld	2
11.	(Netherlands) Gregory van der Wiel	1
11.	(Netherlands) Urby Emanuelson	1
11.	(Cameroon) Eyong Enoh	1
11.	(Sweden) Rasmus Lindgren	1
11.	(Netherlands) André Ooijer	1
11.	(Netherlands) Demy de Zeeuw	1
11.	(Spain) Oleguer	1
11.	(Armenia) Aras Özbiliz	1
Own goals	(Netherlands) Rob Penders (NAC Breda)	1
Own goals	(Netherlands) Denny Landzaat (Twente)	1
Total		72

UEFA Champions League

1.	(Uruguay) Luis Suárez	4
2.	(Morocco) Mounir El Hamdaoui	2
2.	(Netherlands) Demy de Zeeuw	2
2.	(Belgium) Toby Alderweireld	2
5.	(Netherlands) Siem de Jong	1
5.	(Sweden) Rasmus Lindgren	1
5.	(Belgium) Jan Vertonghen	1
Total		13

KNVB Cup

1.	(Serbia) Miralem Sulejmani	3
1.	(Morocco) Mounir El Hamdaoui	3
1.	(Netherlands) Siem de Jong	3
4.	(Netherlands) Demy de Zeeuw	2
4.	(Netherlands) Lorenzo Ebecilio	2
6.	(Belgium) Jan Vertonghen	1
6.	(Netherlands) Urby Emanuelson	1
6.	(Netherlands) Florian Jozefzoon	1
6.	(Denmark) Christian Eriksen	1
6.	(Egypt) Mido	1
6.	(Uruguay) Luis Suárez	1
6.	(Netherlands) Vurnon Anita	1
Total		20

UEFA Europa League

#	Name	Goal
1.	(Serbia) Miralem Sulejmani	2
2.	(Morocco) Mounir El Hamdaoui	1
3.	(Denmark) Christian Eriksen	1
4.	(Belgium) Toby Alderweireld	1
Total		5

== Placements ==
	Friendlies	KNVB Cup	UEFA Champions League	UEFA Europa League	Eredivisie
Status	12 played, 8 wins, 2 draws, 2 losses	Runner-up; Lost to: FC Twente	3rd Place in Group G Placement for: UEFA Europa League	Eliminated in Round of 16; Last opponent: Spartak Moscow	Champions; 73 points in 34 matches 30th title

- Maarten Stekelenburg is voted Player of the year by the supporters of AFC Ajax.
- Christian Eriksen is voted Talent of the year by the supporters of AFC Ajax.
- Christian Eriksen is voted Dutch Football Talent of the Year by De Telegraaf and Football International.

== Competitions ==
All times are in CEST

=== Johan Cruyff Shield ===
31 July 2010	FC Twente	1–0	Ajax	Amsterdam
20:00	De Jong 8'		Suárez (yellow card) 10' (red card) 42'	Stadium: Amsterdam Arena; Attendance: 25,000; Referee: Blom

=== Eredivisie ===
8 August 2010 1	FC Groningen	2–2	Ajax	Groningen
14:30	Matavž 72'; Pedersen 86'		El Hamdaoui 50', 61'	Stadium: Euroborg; Attendance: 22,500; Referee: Nijhuis

14 August 2010 2	Ajax	4–2	Vitesse	Amsterdam
18:45	Vertonghen 37'; Van der Wiel 40'; De Jong 47'; Anita 58'		Pröpper 26'; Van Ginkel 43'	Stadium: Amsterdam Arena; Attendance: 47,831; Referee: Kuipers

21 August 2010 3	Ajax	3–0	Roda JC Kerkrade	Amsterdam
20:45	El Hamdaoui 34', 72'; Suárez 52'			Stadium: Amsterdam Arena; Attendance: 47,159; Referee: Wegereef

29 August 2010 4	De Graafschap	0–5	Ajax	Doetinchem
12:30			Suárez 14', 41', 85'; Emanuelson 68'; Eriksen 89'	Stadium: De Vijverberg; Attendance: 12,550; Referee: Haverkort

11 September 2010 5	Ajax	2–0	Willem II	Amsterdam
18:45	Suárez 34' (pen.), 54' (pen.)			Stadium: Amsterdam Arena; Attendance: 47,702; Referee: Makkelie

19 September 2010 6	Feyenoord	1–2	Ajax	Rotterdam
12:30	Bahia 80'		De Jong 40'; El Hamdaoui 56'	Stadium: De Kuip; Attendance: 43,000; Referee: Blom

25 September 2010 7	FC Twente	2–2	Ajax	Enschede
20:45	Janssen 11', 62'		El Hamdaoui 15'; Enoh 68'	Stadium: De Grolsch Veste; Attendance: 24,000; Referee: Vink

3 October 2010 8	Ajax	1–2	FC Utrecht	Amsterdam
12:30	De Jong 90+3'		Van Wolfswinkel 6' (pen.), 15' (pen.)	Stadium: Amsterdam Arena; Attendance: 45,167; Referee: Kuipers

16 October 2010 9	Ajax	3–0	NAC Breda	Amsterdam
18:45	Vertonghen 15'; El Hamdaoui 30'; Suárez 79'			Stadium: Amsterdam Arena; Attendance: 48,370; Referee: Janssen

24 October 2010 10	Excelsior	2–2	Ajax	Rotterdam
12:30	Bovenberg 37'; Wattamaleo 42'		Anita (red card) 27'; El Hamdaoui 46'; Vertonghen 89'	Stadium: Stadion Woudestein; Attendance: 3,540; Referee: Wegereef

27 October 2010 11	Ajax	3–1	SC Heerenveen	Amsterdam
19:00	El Hamdaoui 11', 48'; Anita 84'		Dost 24'	Stadium: Amsterdam Arena; Attendance: 47,612; Referee: Braamhaar

30 October 2010 12	Heracles Almelo	1–4	Ajax	Almelo
19:45	Overtoom 38'		El Hamdaoui 16'; Lindgren 55'; Ooijer 78'; Sulejmani 81'	Stadium: Polman Stadion; Attendance: 8,500; Referee: Bossen

7 November 2010 13	Ajax	0–1	ADO Den Haag	Amsterdam
12:30			Verhoek 44'	Stadium: Amsterdam Arena; Attendance: 43,914; Referee: Nijhuis

14 November 2010 14	AZ	2–0	Ajax	Alkmaar
14:30	Wernbloom 74'; Sigþórsson 77'		Ooijer (red card) 89'	Stadium: AFAS Stadion; Attendance: 16,779; Referee: Vink

20 November 2010 15	Ajax	0–0	PSV	Amsterdam
20:45	Lindgren (red card) 90+2'			Stadium: Amsterdam Arena; Attendance: 50,082; Referee: Kuipers

28 November 2010 16	VVV-Venlo	0–2	Ajax	Venlo
14:30			Mido 62'; Sulejmani 70'	Stadium: De Koel; Attendance: 7,500; Referee: van Hulten

4 December 2010 17	Ajax	1–1	NEC	Amsterdam
19:45	Mido 76'		Nuytinck 78'	Stadium: Amsterdam Arena; Attendance: 22,000; Referee: Janssen

12 December 2010 18	Vitesse	0–1	Ajax	Arnhem
12:30			Eriksen 11'	Stadium: GelreDome; Attendance: 20,860; Referee: van Boekel

19 January 2011 19	Ajax	2–0	Feyenoord	Amsterdam
20:45	Alderweireld 30'; Sulejmani 77' (pen.)			Stadium: Amsterdam Arena; Attendance: 51,322; Referee: Vink

23 January 2011 20	FC Utrecht	3–0	Ajax	Utrecht
12:30	Duplan 22', 24'; Vorstermans 82'			Stadium: Galgenwaard; Attendance: 24,500; Referee: Bossen

30 January 2011 21	NAC Breda	0–3	Ajax	Breda
14:30			De Jong 13'; Penders 68' (o.g.); Sulejmani 90+3'	Stadium: Rat Verlegh Stadion; Attendance: 19,000; Referee: Nijhuis

4 February 2011 22	Ajax	2–0	De Graafschap	Amsterdam
20:45	El Hamdaoui 43'; De Jong 79'			Stadium: Amsterdam Arena; Attendance: 49,137; Referee: Haverkort

13 February 2011 23	Roda JC	2–2	Ajax	Kerkrade
14:30	Junker 41'; Hadouir 82'		Sulejmani 13'; De Jong 34'	Stadium: Parkstad Limburg Stadion; Attendance: 18,936; Referee: van Hulten

20 February 2011 24	Ajax	1–0	VVV-Venlo	Amsterdam
14:30	El Hamdaoui 11'		Leemans (yellow card) 35' (yellow-red card) 74'	Stadium: Amsterdam Arena; Attendance: 51,078; Referee: Wegereef

27 February 2011 25	PSV	0–0	Ajax	Eindhoven
14:30				Stadium: Philips Stadion; Attendance: 34,400; Referee: Braamhaar

6 March 2011 26	Ajax	4–0	AZ	Amsterdam
16:30	De Zeeuw 5'; De Jong 56'; Ebecilio 72'; Anita 89'		Pellè (red card) 73'	Stadium: Amsterdam Arena; Attendance: 48,328; Referee: Blom

13 March 2011 27	Willem II	1–3	Ajax	Tilburg
14:30	Janga 19'; Halilović (red card) 73'		De Jong 47'; Vertonghen 80'; Eriksen 88'	Stadium: Koning Willem II Stadion; Attendance: 13,500; Referee: Janssen

20 March 2011 28	ADO Den Haag	3–2	Ajax	The Hague
12:30	Kubík 31'; Immers 76'; Derijck 87'		Vertonghen 70'; Eriksen 85'	Stadium: Kyocera Stadion; Attendance: 15,000; Referee: Kuipers

3 April 2011 29	Ajax	3–0	Heracles Almelo	Amsterdam
12:30	Oleguer 58'; De Jong 65'; Özbiliz 81'			Stadium: Amsterdam Arena; Attendance: 50,705; Referee: (Belgium) Gumienny

10 April 2011 30	Ajax	2–0	FC Groningen	Amsterdam
14:30	Sulejmani 69'; Vertonghen 72'			Stadium: Amsterdam Arena; Attendance: 50,150; Referee: van Boekel

17 April 2011 31	NEC	1–2	Ajax	Nijmegen
14:30	Schøne 4'		Sulejmani 45+1'; Alderweireld 66'	Stadium: Stadion de Goffert; Attendance: 12,000; Referee: Nijhuis

24 April 2011 32	Ajax	4–1	Excelsior	Amsterdam
14:30	Ebecilio 13', 78'; Eriksen 71'; De Jong 90+2'		Bovenberg 54'	Stadium: Amsterdam Arena; Attendance: 51,185; Referee: Makkelie

1 May 2011 33	SC Heerenveen	1–2	Ajax	Heerenveen
14:30	Väyrynen 19'		Sulejmani 20'; Eriksen 46'	Stadium: Abe Lenstra Stadion; Attendance: 26.100; Referee: Braamhaar

15 May 2011 34	Ajax	3–1	FC Twente	Amsterdam
14:30	De Jong 23', 78'; Landzaat 47' (o.g.)		Janssen 48'	Stadium: Amsterdam Arena; Attendance: 51,738; Referee: Vink

=== KNVB Cup ===
22 September 2010 Third Round	Ajax	5–0	MVV Maastricht	Amsterdam
18:45	El Hamdaoui 13', 47'; Jozefzoon 23'; Vertonghen 44'; Emanuelson 90'			Stadium: Amsterdam Arena; Attendance: 17,363; Referee: Wiedemeijer

11 November 2010 Fourth Round	Ajax	3–0	BV Veendam	Amsterdam
18:45	Mido 60'; Suárez 75'; Eriksen 87'			Stadium: Amsterdam Arena; Attendance: 22,559; Referee: Liesveld

23 December 2010 Fifth Round	Ajax	1–0	AZ	Amsterdam
20:45	Sulejmani 42'		Wernbloom (red card) 72'	Stadium: Amsterdam Arena; Attendance: 29,539; Referee: Bossen

27 January 2011 Quarter-finals	Ajax	4–1	NAC Breda	Amsterdam
20:45	De Jong 18'; Sulejmani 35' (pen.), 83'; Anita 82'		Idabdelhay 8'	Stadium: Amsterdam Arena; Attendance: 22,536; Referee: Makkelie

3 March 2011 Semi-finals	Ajax	5–1	RKC Waalwijk	Amsterdam
20:45	Ebecilio 13'; El Hamdaoui 33'; De Jong 55', 85'; De Zeeuw 58'		Blind 27' (o.g.)	Stadium: Amsterdam Arena; Attendance: 28,157; Referee: Wiedemeijer

8 May 2011 Final	FC Twente	3–2 (a.e.t.)	Ajax	Rotterdam
18:00	Brama 45'; Janssen 56'; Janko 117'		De Zeeuw 19'; Ebecillio 40'	Stadium: De Kuip; Attendance: 45,000; Referee: Blom

=== UEFA Champions League ===
==== Third qualifying round ====
28 July 2010 First leg	Ajax (Netherlands)	1–1	(Greece) PAOK	Amsterdam, Netherlands
20:45	Suárez 13'	Report	Ivić 72'	Stadium: Amsterdam Arena; Attendance: 24,151; Referee: Tony Chapron (France)

4 August 2010 Second leg	PAOK (Greece)	3–3 (4–4a agg.)	(Netherlands) Ajax	Thessaloniki, Greece
20:45	Vieirinha 16'; Salpingidis 56'; Ivić 90+1'	Report	Suárez 48'; De Jong 50'; Lindgren 55'	Stadium: Toumba Stadium; Attendance: 24,109; Referee: Carlos Velasco Carballo (Spain)

==== Play-off round ====
17 August 2010 First leg	Dynamo Kyiv (Ukraine)	1–1	(Netherlands) Ajax	Kyiv, Ukraine
20:45	Garmash (yellow card) 30' (red card) 56'; Husyev 66'	Report	Vertonghen 57'	Stadium: Lobanovsky Dynamo Stadium; Attendance: 16,500; Referee: Massimo Busacca (Switzerland)

25 August 2010 Second leg	Ajax (Netherlands)	2–1 (3–2 agg.)	(Ukraine) Dynamo Kyiv	Amsterdam, Netherlands
20:45	Suárez 43'; El Hamdaoui 75'	Report	Shevchenko 84' (pen.)	Stadium: Amsterdam Arena; Attendance: 50,249; Referee: Alberto Undiano Mallenco (Spain)

==== Group stage ====
Pos	Team	Pld	W	D	L	GF	GA	GD	Pts	Qualification	RMA	MIL	AJX	AUX
1	(Spain) Real Madrid	6	5	1	0	15	2	+13	16	Advance to knockout phase	—	2–0	2–0	4–0
2	(Italy) Milan	6	2	2	2	7	7	0	8	Advance to knockout phase	2–2	—	0–2	2–0
3	(Netherlands) Ajax	6	2	1	3	6	10	−4	7	Transfer to Europa League	0–4	1–1	—	2–1
4	(France) Auxerre	6	1	0	5	3	12	−9	3		0–1	0–2	2–1	—

Source: Soccerway

15 September 2010 1	Real Madrid (Spain)	2–0	(Netherlands) Ajax	Madrid, Spain
20:45	Anita 31' (o.g.); Higuaín 73'	Report		Stadium: Santiago Bernabéu Stadium; Attendance: 69,639; Referee: Damir Skomina (Slovenia)

28 September 2010 2	Ajax (Netherlands)	1–1	(Italy) Milan	Amsterdam, Netherlands
20:45	El Hamdaoui 23'	Report	Ibrahimović 37'	Stadium: Amsterdam Arena; Attendance: 51,276; Referee: Felix Brych (Germany)

19 October 2010 3	Ajax (Netherlands)	2–1	(France) Auxerre	Amsterdam, Netherlands
20:45	De Zeeuw 7'; Suárez 41'; Ooijer (red card) 55'	Report	Birsa 56'; Oliech (yellow card) 81' (red card) 85'; Mignot (red card) 90+2'	Stadium: Amsterdam Arena; Attendance: 51,383; Referee: Olegário Benquerença (Portugal)

3 November 2010 4	Auxerre (France)	2–1	(Netherlands) Ajax	Auxerre, France
20:45	Sammaritano 9'; Langil 84'	Report	Alderweireld 79'	Stadium: Stade de l'Abbé-Deschamps; Attendance: 18,727; Referee: Mark Clattenburg (England)

23 November 2010 5	Ajax (Netherlands)	0–4	(Spain) Real Madrid	Amsterdam, Netherlands
20:45		Report	Benzema 36'; Arbeloa 44'; Ronaldo 70', 81' (pen.); Alonso (yellow card) 68' (yellow-red card) 87'; Ramos (yellow card) 33' (yellow-red card) 90+1'	Stadium: Amsterdam Arena; Attendance: 48,491; Referee: Craig Thomson (Scotland)
Note: Madrid manager José Mourinho was suspended for one match after UEFA found him guilty of instructing Alonso and Ramos to deliberately receive strategic second yellow cards.

8 December 2010 6	Milan (Italy)	0–2	(Netherlands) Ajax	Milan, Italy
20:45		Report	De Zeeuw 57'; Alderweireld 66'	Stadium: San Siro; Attendance: 72,960; Referee: Claus Bo Larsen (Denmark)

=== UEFA Europa League ===
==== Knockout phase ====
===== Round of 32 =====
17 February 2011 First leg	Anderlecht (Belgium)	0–3	(Netherlands) Ajax	Brussels, Belgium
21:05		Report	Alderweireld 32'; Eriksen 59'; El Hamdaoui 68'	Stadium: Constant Vanden Stock Stadium; Attendance: 21,195; Referee: Gianluca Rocchi (Italy)

25 February 2011 Second leg	Ajax (Netherlands)	2–0 (5–0 agg.)	(Belgium) Anderlecht	Amsterdam, Netherlands
21:05	Sulejmani 11', 17'	Report		Stadium: Amsterdam Arena; Attendance: 42,591; Referee: Martin Hansson (Sweden)

===== Round of 16 =====
10 March 2011 First leg	Ajax (Netherlands)	0–1	(Russia) Spartak Moscow	Amsterdam, Netherlands
21:05		Report	Alex 57'	Stadium: Amsterdam Arena; Attendance: 32,841; Referee: Manuel Gräfe (Germany)

17 March 2011 Second leg	Spartak Moscow (Russia)	3–0 (4–0 agg.)	(Netherlands) Ajax	Moscow, Russia
19:00	D. Kombarov 21'; Welliton 30'; Alex 54'	Report		Stadium: Luzhniki Stadium; Attendance: 45,000; Referee: Martin Atkinson (England)

=== Friendlies ===
3 July 2010	Ajax Amateurs (Netherlands)	1–5	(Netherlands) Ajax	Amsterdam, Netherlands
11:00	Meester 85'		Sulejmani 3', 40', 43'; Sarpong 34'; Claasen 66'	Stadium: De Toekomst; Attendance: 314; Referee: Kevin van den Heuvel (Netherlands)

8 July 2010	Al-Ahly (Egypt)	0–1	(Netherlands) Ajax	Kufstein, Austria
18:30			Sulejmani 90+3'	Stadium: Kufstein Arena; Attendance: 150; Referee: Christian Balaj (Romania)

10 July 2010	Rapid București (Romania)	1–1	(Netherlands) Ajax	Wattens, Austria
18:30	Sburlea 68'; Petre (red card) 85'		De Jong 73'; Lindgren (red card) 85'	Stadium: Alpen stadium Attendance: 150; Referee: Markus Freund (Austria)

15 July 2010	FC Horst (Netherlands)	1–21	(Netherlands) Ajax	Ermelo, Netherlands
19:30				Stadium: De Adelaar; Attendance: 4,000; Referee: Maurice de Hond (Netherlands)

18 July 2010	Porto (Portugal)	1–0	(Netherlands) Ajax	Porto, Portugal
19:00	Rodríguez 13'			Stadium: Estádio do Dragão; Attendance: 40,207; Referee: Artur Soares Dias (Portugal)

20 July 2010	Rijnsburgse Boys (Netherlands)	0–7	(Netherlands) Ajax	Rijnsburg, Netherlands
19:00				Stadium: Middelmors; Attendance: 2,500; Referee: Allard Lindhout (Netherlands)

23 July 2010	Ajax (Netherlands)	3–1	(England) Chelsea	Amsterdam, Netherlands
18:00	Bruma 3' (o.g.); De Jong 26'; Suk 90'		Sturridge 25'	Stadium: Amsterdam Arena; Attendance: 21,000; Referee: Bas Nijhuis (Netherlands)

8 January 2011	Hamburger SV (Germany)	4–2	(Netherlands) Ajax	Hamburg, Germany
16:00	Van Nistelrooy 2', 37', 75'; Jarolím 44'		Suárez 60', 61'	Stadium: HSH Nordbank Arena; Attendance: 20,000; Referee: Bo Larsen (Denmark)

15 January 2011	Galatasaray (Turkey)	0–0	(Netherlands) Ajax	Istanbul, Turkey
19:45				Stadium: Türk Telekom Arena

13 April 2011	Ajax (Netherlands)	4–0	(Japan) Shimizu S-Pulse	Amsterdam, Netherlands
20:15	Cvitanich 25', 35', 67'; Ebecilio 70'			Stadium: Amsterdam Arena; Attendance: 20,000; Referee: Jol (Netherlands)

22 May 2011	D.C. United (United States)	1–2	(Netherlands) Ajax	Washington, D.C., United States
23:00	Brettschneider 58'		Sulejmani 10'; Anita 87'	Stadium: RFK Stadium; Attendance: 10,728; Referee: Geiger (United States)

26 May 2011	Portland Timbers (United States)	0–2	(Netherlands) Ajax	Portland, United States
04:00			Ebecilio 18'; De Zeeuw 89'	Stadium: Jeld-Wen Field; Attendance: 18,627; Referee: Ricardo Salazar (United States)

== Transfers for 2010–11 ==
=== Summer transfer window ===
For a list of all Dutch football transfers in the summer window (1 July 2010 to 1 September 2010) please see List of Dutch football transfers summer 2010.

==== Arrivals ====
- The following players moved to Ajax.

	Name	Position	Transfer type	Previous club	Fee
	Return from loan spell				
Substituted on	(Netherlands) Mitchell Donald	Midfielder	16 May 2010	(Netherlands) Willem II	-
Substituted on	(Croatia) Darko Bodul	Forward	18 May 2010	(Netherlands) Sparta Rotterdam	-
Substituted on	(Netherlands) Daley Blind	Defender	30 June 2010	(Netherlands) Groningen	-
Substituted on	(Netherlands) Evander Sno	Midfielder	30 June 2010	(England) Bristol City	-
	Transfer				
Substituted on	(Morocco) Mounir El Hamdaoui	Forward	30 July 2010	(Netherlands) AZ	€5,000,000
	Free Transfer				
Substituted on	(Netherlands) André Ooijer	Defender	9 August 2010	(Netherlands) PSV	-
Substituted on	(Egypt) Mido	Forward	23 August 2010	(England) Middlesbrough	-
Substituted on	(Finland) Teemu Tainio	Midfielder	31 August 2010	(England) Sunderland	-
Substituted on	(Netherlands) Ronald Graafland	Goalkeeper	9 September 2010	(Netherlands) Vitesse	-

==== Departures ====
- The following players moved from Ajax.

	Name	Position	Transfer type	New club	Fee
	Out on loan				
Substituted off	(Netherlands) Sergio Padt	Goalkeeper	1 June 2010	(Netherlands) Go Ahead Eagles	-
Substituted off	(Netherlands) Jan-Arie van der Heijden	Midfielder	30 July 2011	(Netherlands) Willem II	-
Substituted off	(Netherlands) Rob Wielaert	Defender	22 August 2010	(Netherlands) Roda JC	-
Substituted off	(Morocco) Ismaïl Aissati	Midfielder	24 August 2010	(Netherlands) Vitesse	-
	Loan return				
Substituted off	(Brazil) Zé Eduardo	Midfielder	30 June 2010	(Brazil) Cruzeiro	-
Substituted off	(Brazil) Kerlon	Forward	30 June 2010	(Italy) Inter Milan	-
	Transfer				
Substituted off	(Netherlands) Jeffrey Sarpong	Midfielder	23 August 2010	(Spain) Real Sociedad	€200,000
	Free Transfer				
Substituted off	(Spain) Gabri	Midfielder	26 May 2010	(Qatar) Umm-Salal	-
Substituted off	(Sweden) Kennedy Bakircioglü	Forward	6 July 2010	(Spain) Racing Santander	-
Substituted off	(Armenia) Edgar Manucharyan	Forward	10 July 2010	(Armenia) Pyunik	-
Substituted off	(Denmark) Dennis Rommedahl	Forward	11 July 2011	(Greece) Olympiacos	-
Substituted off	(Romania) George Ogăraru	Defender	17 July 2010	(Switzerland) Sion	-
Substituted off	(South Africa) Daylon Claasen	Midfielder	13 August 2010	(Belgium) Lierse	-
Substituted off	(Serbia) Marko Pantelić	Forward	20 August 2010	(Greece) Olympiacos	-
Substituted off	(Netherlands Antilles) Javier Martina	Forward	25 August 2010	(Canada) Toronto FC	-
Substituted off	(Spain) Albert Luque	Forward	1 July 2010	(Spain) Málaga	-

=== Winter transfer window ===
For a list of all Dutch football transfers in the winter window (1 January 2011 to 1 February 2011) please see List of Dutch football transfers winter 2010–11.

==== Arrivals ====
- The following players moved to Ajax.

	Name	Position	Transfer type	Previous club	Fee
	Return from loan spell				
Substituted on	(Argentina) Darío Cvitanich	Forward	1 January 2011	(Mexico) Pachuca	-
Substituted on	(Uruguay) Bruno Silva	Defender	1 January 2011	(Brazil) Internacional	-
	Free Transfer				
Substituted on	(Finland) Henri Toivomäki	Defender	3 January 2011	(Finland) Lahti	-

==== Departures ====
- The following players moved from Ajax.

	Name	Position	Transfer type	New club	Fee
	Out on loan				
Substituted off	(Netherlands) Marvin Zeegelaar	Forward	24 January 2011	(Netherlands) Excelsior	-
	Transfer				
Substituted off	(Netherlands) Urby Emanuelson	Midfielder	23 January 2011	(Italy) Milan	€1,700,000
Substituted off	(Uruguay) Luis Suárez	Forward	28 January 2011	(England) Liverpool	€26,500,000
	Free Transfer				
Substituted off	(Egypt) Mido	Forward	22 January 2011	(Egypt) Zamalek	-
Substituted off	(Croatia) Darko Bodul	Forward	31 January 2011	(Portugal) Nacional	-
Substituted off	(Finland) Teemu Tainio	Midfielder	8 March 2011	(United States) New York Red Bulls	-
