= 2009–10 AFC Ajax season =

Dutch football club season

Ajax
2009–10 season
- Chairman: Uri Coronel
- Manager: Martin Jol
- Eredivisie: 2nd
- KNVB Cup: Winners
- Europa League: Round of 32
- Top goalscorer: League: Luis Suárez (35 goals); All: Luis Suárez (49 goals)
Home colours	Away colours

During the 2009–10 season, AFC Ajax participated in the Eredivisie, the KNVB Cup and the UEFA Europa League. The first training took place on 22 June 2009. The traditional AFC Ajax Open Day was on Wednesday 29 July.

== Pre-season ==
The first training for the 2009–10 season was held on 22 June 2009. In preparation for the new season, Ajax organized a training camp in Amsterdam at the De Toekomst Sportpark. During the pre-season, the squad from manager Martin Jol played friendly matches against Ajax Cape Town, DWV, WKE and SV Huizen before traveling to England to play one against Bristol City and play Southampton for the Ted Bates Trophy. They then returned to Amsterdam to play Atlético Madrid and Benfica in the annual Amsterdam Tournament.

== Player statistics ==
Appearances for competitive matches only

No.	Pos	Nat	Player	Total		Eredivisie		UEFA Europa League		KNBV Cup	
No.	Pos	Nat	Player	Apps	Goals	Apps	Goals	Apps	Goals	Apps	Goals
1	GK	(Netherlands) NED	Maarten Stekelenburg	50	0	33	0	10	0	7	0
2	DF	(Netherlands) NED	Gregory van der Wiel	50	6	34	6	10	0	6	0
3	DF	(Spain) ESP	Oleguer	13	0	6	0	5	0	2	0
4	MF	(Brazil) BRA	Zé Eduardo	0	0	0	0	0	0	0	0
5	DF	(Belgium) BEL	Jan Vertonghen	49	3	32	3	10	0	7	0
6	MF	(Sweden) SWE	Rasmus Lindgren	7	1	6	1	0	0	1	0
7	DF	(Cameroon) CMR	Timothée Atouba	3	0	1	0	2	0	0	0
8	FW	(Netherlands) NED	Urby Emanuelson	48	8	31	5	10	1	7	2
9	FW	(Serbia) SRB	Marko Pantelić	38	21	25	16	7	2	6	3
10	FW	(Serbia) SRB	Miralem Sulejmani	31	3	17	2	10	1	4	0
11	FW	(Morocco) MAR	Ismaïl Aissati	18	5	14	3	2	0	2	2
12	GK	(Netherlands) NED	Kenneth Vermeer	1	0	1	0	0	0	0	0
16	FW	(Uruguay) URU	Luis Suárez	48	49	33	35	9	6	6	8
17	DF	(Netherlands) NED	Rob Wielaert	4	0	3	0	1	0	0	0
18	MF	(Spain) ESP	Gabri	15	0	13	0	1	0	1	0
19	DF	(Belgium) BEL	Toby Alderweireld	45	3	31	2	8	0	6	1
21	MF	(Cameroon) CMR	Eyong Enoh	41	1	27	1	9	0	5	0
22	MF	(Netherlands) NED	Siem de Jong	35	17	22	10	7	1	6	6
23	DF	(Netherlands Antilles) ANT	Vurnon Anita	35	1	26	0	4	0	5	1
28	FW	(Denmark) DEN	Dennis Rommedahl	41	9	28	6	7	2	6	1
30	DF	(Romania) ROU	George Ogăraru	0	0	0	0	0	0	0	0
32	FW	(Brazil) BRA	Kerlon	0	0	0	0	0	0	0	0
34	FW	(Sweden) SWE	Kennedy Bakircioglü	15	5	9	2	3	1	3	2
39	FW	(South Korea) KOR	Suk Hyun-Jun	3	0	3	0	0	0	0	0
40	MF	(Netherlands) NED	Demy de Zeeuw	48	11	32	7	10	1	6	3
41	GK	(Netherlands) NED	Jeroen Verhoeven	0	0	0	0	0	0	0	0
43	FW	(Netherlands) NED	Marvin Zeegelaar	3	0	2	0	1	0	0	0
45	MF	(Uruguay) URU	Nicolás Lodeiro	10	1	8	0	0	0	2	1
51	MF	(Denmark) DEN	Christian Eriksen	21	1	15	0	2	0	4	1
Players sold or loaned out after the start of the season:
15	DF	(Uruguay) URU	Bruno Silva	2	0	0	0	1	0	1	0
20	FW	(Argentina) ARG	Darío Cvitanich	11	4	6	4	3	0	2	0
26	MF	(Netherlands) NED	Jeffrey Sarpong	0	0	0	0	0	0	0	0
27	DF	(Netherlands) NED	Daley Blind	0	0	0	0	0	0	0	0
29	MF	(Netherlands) NED	Mitchell Donald	17	2	14	1	3	1	0	0
31	GK	(Netherlands) NED	Sergio Padt	0	0	0	0	0	0	0	0
33	FW	(Netherlands Antilles) ANT	Javier Martina	0	0	0	0	0	0	0	0
52	MF	(Netherlands) NED	Tom Overtoom	0	0	0	0	0	0	0	0
60	DF	(Netherlands) NED	Timothy van der Meulen	0	0	0	0	0	0	0	0

As of 24 October 2011

=== 2009–10 selection by nationality ===
Nationality	(Netherlands)	(Spain)	(Belgium)	(Brazil)	(Cameroon)	(Denmark)	(Serbia)	(Sweden)	(Netherlands Antilles)	(Morocco)	(Romania)	(South Korea)	(Armenia)	Total Players
Current squad selection	8	2	2	2	2	2	2	2	1	1	1	-	-	27
Youth/reserves squad in AFC Ajax selection	2	-	-	-	-	-	-	-	-	-	-	1	-	3
Players out on loan	7	1	1	-	-	-	-	-	-	1	-	-	1	12

== Team statistics ==
=== Eredivisie standings 2009–10 ===
Standing	Matches played	Wins	Draws	Losses	Points	Goals for	Goals against	Yellow cards (yellow card)	Red cards (red card)
2	34	27	4	3	85	106	20	55	2

==== Points by match day ====
Match day	1	2	3	4	5	6	7	8	9	10	11	12	13	14	15	16	17	18	19	20	21	22	23	24	25	26	27	28	29	30	31	32	33	34	Total
Points	3	3	0	1	3	3	3	3	1	3	3	3	0	3	3	0	3	1	3	1	3	3	3	3	3	3	3	3	3	3	3	3	3	3	85

==== Total points by match day ====
Match day	1	2	3	4	5	6	7	8	9	10	11	12	13	14	15	16	17	18	19	20	21	22	23	24	25	26	27	28	29	30	31	32	33	34	Total
Points	3	6	6	7	10	13	16	19	20	23	26	29	29	32	35	35	38	39	42	43	46	49	52	55	58	61	64	67	70	73	76	79	82	85	85

==== Standing by match day ====
Match day	1	2	3	4	5	6	7	8	9	10	11	12	13	14	15	16	17	18	19	20	21	22	23	24	25	26	27	28	29	30	31	32	33	34	Standing
Standing	2nd	1st	6th	6th	6th	4th	3rd	3rd	3rd	3rd	3rd	3rd	3rd	3rd	3rd	3rd	3rd	3rd	3rd	3rd	3rd	3rd	3rd	3rd	3rd	3rd	3rd	2nd	2nd	2nd	2nd	2nd	2nd	2nd	2nd

==== Goals by match day ====
Match day	1	2	3	4	5	6	7	8	9	10	11	12	13	14	15	16	17	18	19	20	21	22	23	24	25	26	27	28	29	30	31	32	33	34	Total
Goals	2	4	3	0	3	6	4	3	2	4	4	5	0	5	5	2	3	1	1	1	4	3	2	4	4	3	4	5	3	1	7	2	4	4	106

=== Statistics for the 2009–10 season ===
- This is an overview of all the statistics for played matches in the 2009–10 season.

	Friendlies	Ted Bates Trophy	Amsterdam Tournament	Chippie Polar Cup	KNVB Cup	UEFA Europa League	Eredivisie	Total
Matches	8	1	2	2	7	10	34	64
Wins	7	1	0	2	7	4	27	48
Draws	1	0	1	0	0	4	4	10
Losses	0	0	1	0	0	2	3	6
Home	1	0	2	0	2	5	17	27
Away	7	1	0	2	5	5	17	37
Yellow cards (yellow card)	1	0	0	0	11	17	55	84
Red cards (red card)	0	0	0	0	1	0	2	3
2 x yellow in 1 match (yellow card) (yellow-red card)	0	0	0	0	1	0	1	2
Number of substitutes used (substituted on) (substituted off)	61	3	9	0	18	29	89	209
Goals for	49	4	5	3	33	16	106	216
Goals against	5	1	6	0	6	9	20	47
Balance	+44	+3	-1	+3	+27	+7	+86	+169
Clean sheets	4	0	0	2	2	4	20	31
Penalties for	3	1	1	1	0	3	9	18
Penalties against	1	0	0	0	1	0	1	3

=== 2009–10 team records ===
Description	Competition	Result
Biggest win	(Netherlands) Friendly match	HZVV – AFC Ajax ( 0–11 )
Biggest win	(Netherlands) KNVB Cup	WHC – AFC Ajax ( 1–14 )
Biggest win	(European Union) UEFA Europa League	AFC Ajax – Slovan Bratislava ( 5–0 )
Biggest win	(Netherlands) Eredivisie	AFC Ajax – VVV-Venlo ( 7–0 )
Biggest loss	(Netherlands) Friendly match	—
Biggest loss	(Netherlands) KNVB Cup	—
Biggest loss	(European Union) UEFA Europa League	AFC Ajax – Anderlecht ( 1–3 )
Biggest loss	(Netherlands) Eredivisie	Utrecht – AFC Ajax ( 2–0 )
Most goals in a match	(Netherlands) Friendly match	HZVV – AFC Ajax ( 0–11 )
Most goals in a match	(Netherlands) KNVB Cup	WHC – AFC Ajax ( 1–14 )
Most goals in a match	(European Union) UEFA Europa League	AFC Ajax – Slovan Bratislava ( 5–0 )
Most goals in a match	(Netherlands) Eredivisie	AFC Ajax – VVV-Venlo ( 7–0 )

==== Topscorers ====
Friendlies

Nr.	Name	Goal
1.	(Uruguay) Luis Suárez	8
2.	(Argentina) Darío Cvitanich	6
3.	(Croatia) Darko Bodul	5
4.	(Netherlands) Siem de Jong	4
4.	(Morocco) Ismaïl Aissati	4
6.	(Sweden) Kennedy Bakircioglü	3
7.	(Belgium) Jan Vertonghen	2
7.	(Netherlands) Evander Sno	2
7.	(Netherlands) Mitchell Donald	2
7.	(Netherlands) Urby Emanuelson	2
7.	(Denmark) Dennis Rommedahl	2
7.	(Netherlands Antilles) Javier Martina	2
13.	(Netherlands) Gregory van der Wiel	1
13.	(Spain) Oleguer	1
13.	(Sweden) Rasmus Lindgren	1
13.	(Netherlands) Jan-Arie van der Heijden	1
13.	(Netherlands) Marvin Zeegelaar	1
13.	(Serbia) Marko Pantelić	1
13.	(Spain) Albert Luque	1
Total		49

Eredivisie

Nr.	Name	Goal
1.	(Uruguay) Luis Suárez	35
2.	(Serbia) Marko Pantelić	16
3.	(Netherlands) Siem de Jong	10
4.	(Netherlands) Demy de Zeeuw	7
5.	(Netherlands) Gregory van der Wiel	6
5.	(Denmark) Dennis Rommedahl	6
7.	(Netherlands) Urby Emanuelson	5
8.	(Argentina) Darío Cvitanich	4
9.	(Belgium) Jan Vertonghen	3
9.	(Morocco) Ismaïl Aissati	3
11.	(Belgium) Toby Alderweireld	2
11.	(Serbia) Miralem Sulejmani	2
11.	(Sweden) Kennedy Bakircioglü	2
14.	(Sweden) Rasmus Lindgren	1
14.	(Cameroon) Eyong Enoh	1
14.	(Netherlands) Mitchell Donald	1
Total		106

KNVB Cup

Nr.	Name	Goal
1.	(Uruguay) Luis Suárez	8
2.	(Netherlands) Siem de Jong	6
3.	(Netherlands) Demy de Zeeuw	3
3.	(Serbia) Marko Pantelić	3
5.	(Morocco) Ismaïl Aissati	2
5.	(Netherlands) Urby Emanuelson	2
5.	(Sweden) Kennedy Bakircioglü	2
8.	(Belgium) Toby Alderweireld	1
8.	(Netherlands Antilles) Vurnon Anita	1
8.	(Denmark) Christian Eriksen	1
8.	(Uruguay) Nicolás Lodeiro	1
8.	(Denmark) Dennis Rommedahl	1
Total		33

UEFA Europa League

Nr.	Name	Goal
1.	(Uruguay) Luis Suárez	6
2.	(Denmark) Dennis Rommedahl	2
2.	(Serbia) Marko Pantelić	2
4.	(Netherlands) Siem de Jong	1
4.	(Netherlands) Demy de Zeeuw	1
4.	(Netherlands) Mitchell Donald	1
4.	(Netherlands) Urby Emanuelson	1
4.	(Serbia) Miralem Sulejmani	1
4.	(Sweden) Kennedy Bakircioglü	1
Total		16

Amsterdam Tournament

Nr.	Name	Goal
1.	(Denmark) Dennis Rommedahl	2
2.	(Netherlands) Mitchell Donald	1
2.	(Uruguay) Luis Suárez	1
2.	(Argentina) Darío Cvitanich	1
Total		5

Ted Bates Trophy

#	Name	Goal
1.	(Uruguay) Luis Suárez	2
2.	(Belgium) Toby Alderweireld	1
2.	(Netherlands) Marvin Zeegelaar	1
Total		4

Chippie Polar Cup

Nr.	Name	Goal
1.	(Netherlands) Urby Emanuelson	2
2.	(Belgium) Toby Alderweireld	1
Total		3

== Placements ==
	Friendlies	Ted Bates Trophy	Amsterdam Tournament	Chippie Polar Cup	KNVB Cup	UEFA Europa League	Eredivisie
Status	8 played, 7 wins, 1 draw, 0 losses	Winners	2nd place	Winners	Winners; 18th title	Eliminated in Round of 32; Last opponent: Juventus	2nd place 85 points in 34 matches qualified for UEFA Champions League Qualifying rounds

- Luis Suárez finishes as topscorer of the Eredivisie with 35 goals in 34 matches.
- Luis Suárez is voted Player of the year by the supporters of AFC Ajax.
- Toby Alderweireld is voted Talent of the year by the supporters of AFC Ajax.
- Martin Jol is nominated for the Rinus Michels Award 2010 in the category: Best Trainer/Coach in Professional Football.
- Luis Suárez ties the record of Mateja Kežman of most goals in the Eredivisie by a foreigner with 35 goals.
- Luis Suárez is voted Dutch Footballer of the Year by De Telegraaf and Football International.
- Gregory van der Wiel is voted Dutch Football Talent of the Year by De Telegraaf and Football International
- Demy de Zeeuw wins the Bronze boots award.

== Competitions ==
All times are in CEST

=== Eredivisie ===
2 August 2009 1	Groningen	0–2	Ajax	Groningen
14:30		Report	Sulejmani 41'; Rommedahl 72'	Stadium: Euroborg; Attendance: 22,000; Referee: Björn Kuipers

8 August 2009 2	Ajax	4–1	RKC Waalwijk	Amsterdam
18:45	Van der Wiel 10'; Suárez 71' (pen.), 82', 90+1'	Report	De Ceulaer 30'	Stadium: Amsterdam Arena; Attendance: 49,072; Referee: Roelof Luinge

16 August 2009 3	PSV	4–3	Ajax	Eindhoven
12:30	Dzsudzsák 36', 54'; Bakkal 49', 74'	Report	Suárez 2', 38'; Emanuelson 57'	Stadium: Philips Stadion; Attendance: 33,000; Referee: Pieter Vink

23 August 2009 4	Ajax	0–0	Sparta Rotterdam	Amsterdam
14:30		Report		Stadium: Amsterdam Arena; Attendance: 46,128; Referee: Jan Wegereef

30 August 2009 5	Heracles Almelo	0–3	Ajax	Almelo
16:30		Report	Alderweireld 67'; Cvitanich 86'; Aissati 88'	Stadium: Polman Stadion; Attendance: 8,500; Referee: Pol van Boekel

13 September 2009 6	Ajax	6–0	NAC Breda	Amsterdam
14:30	Cvitanich 2', 45', 62'; Vertonghen 18'; Suárez 41'; Bakircioglü 47'	Report		Stadium: Amsterdam Arena; Attendance: 48,127; Referee: Bas Nijhuis

20 September 2009 7	VVV-Venlo	0–4	Ajax	Venlo
14:30		Report	Suárez 3', 68', 70', 90'	Stadium: De Koel; Attendance: 7,000; Referee: Ruud Bossen

27 September 2009 8	Ajax	3–0	ADO Den Haag	Amsterdam
12:30	De Zeeuw 25'; Pantelić 71'; De Jong 89'	Report		Stadium: Amsterdam Arena; Attendance: 44,190; Referee: Paul Allaerts

4 October 2009 9	Roda JC	2–2	Ajax	Kerkrade
12:30	Djoum 24'; Bodor 54'	Report	Suárez 23' (pen.), 66'	Stadium: Parkstad Limburg Stadion; Attendance: 17,500; Referee: Eric Braamhaar

17 October 2009 10	Ajax	4–0	Willem II	Amsterdam
18:45	Enoh 46'; Sulejmani 64'; Pantelić 82'; Suárez 90'	Report		Stadium: Amsterdam Arena; Attendance: 49,900; Referee: Pol van Boekel

25 October 2009 11	AZ	2–4	Ajax	Alkmaar
14:30	El Hamdaoui 28'; Pellè 91'	Report	Emanuelson 56'; Suárez 58', 90+1'; Van der Wiel 64'	Stadium: DSB Stadion; Attendance: 16,867; Referee: Bas Nijhuis

1 November 2009 12	Ajax	5–1	Feyenoord	Amsterdam
12:30	De Zeeuw 41', 81'; Emanuelson 46'; Van der Wiel 57'; Suárez 90+1' (pen.)	Report	Landzaat 74'	Stadium: Amsterdam Arena; Attendance: 51,028; Referee: Kevin Blom

8 November 2009 13	FC Twente	1–0	Ajax	Enschede
16:30	Ruiz 46'	Report		Stadium: De Grolsch Veste; Attendance: 24,000; Referee: Pieter Vink

22 November 2009 14	Ajax	5–1	Heerenveen	Amsterdam
14:30	De Zeeuw 7', 24'; Pantelić 27'; Suárez 34' (pen.); Aissati 39'	Report	Popov 38'	Stadium: Amsterdam Arena; Attendance: 49,598; Referee: Roelof Luinge

29 November 2009 15	Vitesse	1–5	Ajax	Arnhem
12:30	Stevanovic 3'	Report	Pantelić 15', 18', 49'; Bakircioglü 68'; Aissati 72'	Stadium: GelreDome; Attendance: 21,850; Referee: Ruud Bossen

6 December 2009 16	FC Utrecht	2–0	Ajax	Utrecht
12:30	Mulenga 47'; Wuytens 66'	Report		Stadium: Stadion Galgenwaard; Attendance: 24,000; Referee: Bas Nijhuis

11 December 2009 17	Ajax	3–0	N.E.C.	Amsterdam
20:45	Suárez 47'; De Jong 65'; Donald 78'	Report		Stadium: Amsterdam Arena; Attendance: 47,297; Referee: Eric Braamhaar

17 January 2010 18	NAC Breda	1–1	Ajax	Breda
14:30	Cairo 19'	Report	Lindgren 36'	Stadium: Rat Verlegh Stadion; Attendance: 17,750; Referee: Kevin Blom

24 January 2010 19	Ajax	1–0	AZ	Amsterdam
12:30	Van der Wiel 63'	Report		Stadium: Amsterdam Arena; Attendance: 47,770; Referee: Björn Kuipers

31 January 2010 20	Feyenoord	1–1	Ajax	Rotterdam
12:30	Wijnaldum 66'	Report	Pantelić 24'	Stadium: Feyenoord Stadion; Attendance: 47,000; Referee: Pieter Vink

3 February 2010 21	Ajax	4–0	Roda JC	Amsterdam
20:15	Suárez 54' (pen.), 69' (pen.), 78', 85'	Report		Stadium: Amsterdam Arena; Attendance: 46,556; Referee: Bas Nijhuis

7 February 2010 22	Ajax	3–0	FC Twente	Amsterdam
16:30	De Zeeuw 21'; Pantelić 44'; Rommedahl 74'	Report		Stadium: Amsterdam Arena; Attendance: 49,184; Referee: Jan Wegereef

13 February 2010 23	SC Heerenveen	0–2	Ajax	Heerenveen
19:45		Report	Rommedahl 48'; Suárez 89'	Stadium: Abe Lenstra Stadion; Attendance: 26,000; Referee: Ruud Bossen

21 February 2010 24	Ajax	4–0	Vitesse	Amsterdam
14:30	De Jong 17', 57'; Suárez 20'; Verhaegh 26' (o.g.)	Report		Stadium: Amsterdam Arena; Attendance: 47,726; Referee: Jack van Hulten

28 February 2010 25	Ajax	4–0	FC Utrecht	Amsterdam
12:30	Suárez 42', 83'; Van der Wiel 66'; Rommedahl 88'	Report		Stadium: Amsterdam Arena; Attendance: 45,113; Referee: Eric Braamhaar

7 March 2010 26	Sparta Rotterdam	0–3	Ajax	Rotterdam
12:30		Report	De Jong 13'; Van der Wiel 35'; Rommedahl 61'	Stadium: Sparta Stadion Het Kasteel; Attendance: 10,000; Referee: Paul Allaerts

14 March 2010 27	Ajax	4–1	PSV	Amsterdam
16:30	De Jong 27'; Emanuelson 43'; Pantelić 64'; Suárez 89'	Report	Dzsudzsák 82' (pen.)	Stadium: Amsterdam Arena; Attendance: 50,984; Referee: Kevin Blom

21 March 2010 28	RKC Waalwijk	1–5	Ajax	Waalwijk
12:30	Pantelić 27' (o.g.)	Report	De Jong 8'; Suárez 47', 84'; Mulder 64' (o.g.); Rommedahl 86'	Stadium: Mandemakers Stadion; Attendance: 7,500; Referee: Richard Liesveld

28 March 2010 29	Ajax	3–0	FC Groningen	Amsterdam
14:30	Vertonghen 37', 81'; De Jong 66'	Report		Stadium: Amsterdam Arena; Attendance: 47,000; Referee: Ruud Bossen

4 April 2010 30	ADO Den Haag	0–1	Ajax	The Hague
12:30		Report	Alderweireld 92'	Stadium: Kyocera Stadion; Attendance: 13,921; Referee: Jan Wegereef

11 April 2010 31	Ajax	7–0	VVV-Venlo	Amsterdam
14:30	Suárez 4', 9' (pen.), 41'; Pantelić 12', 74', 80'; Emanuelson 37'	Report		Stadium: Amsterdam Arena; Attendance: 51,677; Referee: Danny Makkelie

14 April 2010 32	Willem II	0–2	Ajax	Tilburg
19:00		Report	Suárez 4' (pen.); Pantelić 59'	Stadium: Koning Willem II Stadion; Attendance: 14,500; Referee: Pol van Boekel

18 April 2010 33	Ajax	4–0	Heracles Almelo	Amsterdam
14:30	De Jong 20', 37'; Pantelić 59', 64'	Report		Stadium: Amsterdam Arena; Attendance: 51,554; Referee: Kevin Blom

2 May 2010 34	N.E.C.	1–4	Ajax	Nijmegen
14:30	Ntibazonkiza 87'	Report	Suárez 15', 63'; De Zeeuw 35'; Pantelić 42'	Stadium: Goffertstadion; Attendance: 12,500; Referee: Ruud Bossen

=== KNVB Cup ===
24 September 2009 Second Round	AGOVV	1–2	Ajax	Apeldoorn
20:45	Chadli 77' (pen.)	[[[Category:All articles with unsourced statements]] Report]	Anita 51'; Suart 61' (o.g.)	Stadium: Sportpark Berg & Bos; Attendance: 3.259; Referee: Michel Winter

29 October 2009 Third Round	FC Dordrecht	1–2 (a.e.t.)	Ajax	Dordrecht
20:45	Kalisse 81'		Emanuelson 47', 119'	Stadium: GN Bouw Stadion; Attendance: 4.100; Referee: Richard Liesveld

23 December 2009 Round of 16	WHC	1–14	Ajax	Zwolle
18:30	Stel 44'	Report	Pantelić 18', 24'; Aissati 26', 30'; Suárez 27', 33', 53', 59', 86', 89'; Bosch 60' (o.g.); Bakircioglü 67', 83'; De Zeeuw 85'	Stadium: FC Zwolle Stadion; Referee: Danny Makkelie

27 January 2010 Quarter-finals	Ajax	3 − 2 (a.e.t.)	NEC	Amsterdam
18:30	De Zeeuw 43'; Alderweireld 112'; De Jong 114'	Report	Vleminckx 83'; Van Eijden 93'	Stadium: Amsterdam Arena; Attendance: 17,398; Referee: Richard Liesveld

27 January 2010 Semi-finals	Go Ahead Eagles	0–6	Ajax	Deventer
18:30		Report	De Zeeuw 11'; Pantelić 38'; De Jong 75'; Eriksen 77'; Rommedahl 78'; Lodeiro 85'	Stadium: De Adelaarshorst; Attendance: 6,439; Referee: Jack van Hulten

25 April 2010 Final 1st Leg	Ajax	2–0	Feyenoord	Amsterdam
18:00	De Jong 5', 7'	Report		Stadium: Amsterdam Arena; Attendance: 40,000; Referee: Eric Braamhaar

6 May 2010 Final 2nd Leg	Feyenoord	1–4 (1–6 agg.)	Ajax	Rotterdam
18:00	Tomasson 71'	Report	Suárez 4', 83'; De Jong 64', 77'	Stadium: Feyenoord Stadion; Attendance: 48,000; Referee: Roelof Luinge

=== UEFA Europa League ===
==== Play-off round ====
20 August 2009 First leg	Ajax (Netherlands)	5–0	(Slovakia) Slovan Bratislava	Amsterdam, Netherlands
20:45	Suárez 43', 65', 79', 84'; Donald 91'	Report		Stadium: Amsterdam Arena; Attendance: 20,168; Referee: Mark Clattenburg (England)

27 August 2009 Second leg	Slovan Bratislava (Slovakia)	1–2 (1–7 agg.)	(Netherlands) Ajax	Bratislava, Slovakia
18:30	Sylvestr 46'	Report	De Jong 30'; Bakircioglü 84'	Stadium: Štadión Tehelné pole Attendance: 6,880; Referee: Kostas Kapitanis (Cyprus)

==== Group stage ====
Pos	Team	Pld	W	D	L	GF	GA	GD	Pts	Qualification	AND	AJX	DZ	TIM
1	(Belgium) Anderlecht	6	3	2	1	9	4	+5	11	Advance to knockout phase	—	1–1	0–1	3–1
2	(Netherlands) Ajax	6	3	2	1	8	6	+2	11	Advance to knockout phase	1–3	—	2–1	0–0
3	(Croatia) Dinamo Zagreb (Note: On 29 October 2009, UEFA's Control and Disciplinary Body ruled that Dinamo Zagreb would have to play their next two home matches in the UEFA Europa League behind closed doors due to the actions of their supporters in their match at Timișoara. They also deducted three points from the Croatian club's points tally in Group A. The club appealed, but the appeal was not heard until after the first closed-doors game against Ajax. After the appeal was heard, UEFA replaced the three-point deduction with a €75,000 fine, and a three-year suspended ban from European competition, while the two-match stadium ban remained unchanged.)	6	2	0	4	6	8	−2	6		0–2	0–2	—	1–2
4	(Romania) Timișoara	6	1	2	3	4	9	−5	5		0–0	1–2	0–3	—

Source: Soccerway
Notes:

17 September 2009 1	Ajax (Netherlands)	0–0	(Romania) Politehnica Timișoara	Amsterdam, Netherlands
19:00		Report		Stadium: Amsterdam Arena; Attendance: 25,391; Referee: Alon Yefet (Israel)

1 October 2009 2	Anderlecht (Belgium)	1–1	(Netherlands) Ajax	Brussels, Belgium
20:45	Legear 85'	Report	Rommedahl 72'	Stadium: Constant Vanden Stock Stadium; Attendance: 23,000; Referee: Kristinn Jakobsson (Iceland)

22 October 2009 3	Ajax (Netherlands)	2–1	(Croatia) Dinamo Zagreb	Amsterdam, Netherlands
20:45	Suárez 3' (pen.); Rommedahl 80'	Report	Tomecak 93'	Stadium: Amsterdam Arena; Attendance: 30,700; Referee: Thomas Einwaller (Austria)

5 November 2009 4	Dinamo Zagreb (Croatia)	0–2	(Netherlands) Ajax	Zagreb, Croatia
19:00		Report	Pantelić 13'; De Zeeuw 46'	Stadium: Maksimir Stadion; Referee: Mike Dean (England)

2 December 2009 5	Politehnica Timișoara (Romania)	1–2	(Netherlands) Ajax	Timișoara, Romania
20:45	Goga 2'	Report	Suárez 8'; Pantelić 46'	Stadium: Stadionul Dan Păltinişanu; Attendance: 8,085; Referee: Paolo Tagliavento ((Italy))

17 December 2009 6	Ajax (Netherlands)	1–3	(Belgium) Anderlecht	Amsterdam, Netherlands
19:00	Emanuelson 77'	Report	Lukaku 13', 22'; Legear 43'	Stadium: Amsterdam Arena; Attendance: 36,156; Referee: Cüneyt Çakır (Turkey)

==== Knockout phase ====
===== Round of 32 =====
18 February 2010 First leg	Ajax (Netherlands)	1–2	(Italy) Juventus	Amsterdam, Netherlands
19:00	Sulejmani 16'	Report	Amauri 31', 58'	Stadium: Amsterdam Arena; Attendance: 51,675; Referee: Ivan Bebek (Croatia)

25 February 2010 Second leg	Juventus (Italy)	0–0 (2–1 agg.)	(Netherlands) Ajax	Turin, Italy
21:05		Report		Stadium: Stadio Grande Torino; Attendance: 20,000; Referee: Laurent Duhamel (France)

=== Ted Bates Trophy ===
18 July 2009	Southampton (England)	1–4	(Netherlands) Ajax	Southampton, England
16:00	Mills 15'	Report	Suárez 28' (pen.), 48'; Alderweireld 81'; Zeegelaar 88'	Stadium: St. Mary's Stadium; Attendance: 24,000; Referee: Lee Robert

=== Amsterdam Tournament ===
24 July 2009	Ajax (Netherlands)	3–3	(Spain) Atlético Madrid	Amsterdam
21:15	Cvitanich 8'; Rommedahl 70'; Suárez 90' (pen.)	Report	Simão 29'; Agüero 41'; Rodríguez 76'	Stadium: Amsterdam Arena; Attendance: 20,450; Referee: Eric Braamhaar

24 July 2009	Ajax (Netherlands)	2–3	(Portugal) Benfica	Amsterdam
21:15	Donald 45'; Rommedahl 78'	Report	Aissati 9' (o.g.); Di María 31'; David Luiz 55'	Stadium: Amsterdam Arena; Attendance: 18,160; Referee: Pieter Vink

Final standings of the FWS Amsterdam Tournament 2009

Team	Pld	W	D	L	GF	Pts
(Portugal) Benfica	2	2	0	0	5	11
(Netherlands) Ajax	2	0	1	1	5	6
(England) Sunderland	2	1	0	1	2	5
(Spain) Atlético Madrid	2	0	1	3	3	4

=== Chippie Polar Cup ===
21 May 2010	Hubentut Fortuna (Netherlands Antilles)	0–3	(Netherlands) Ajax	Brievengat, Curaçao
21:05		Report	Emanuelson; Alderweireld	Stadium: Ergilio Hato Stadion; Attendance: - Referee: -

23 May 2010	N.E.C. (Netherlands)	0–0 (a.e.t.) (3–4 p)	(Netherlands) Ajax	Brievengat, Curaçao
15:00		Report		Stadium: Ergilio Hato Stadion; Attendance: - Referee: -

Final standings of the Chippie Polar Cup 2010

Team	Pld	W	D	L	GF	GA	Pts
(Netherlands) Ajax	2	2	0	0	7	0	6
(Netherlands) N.E.C.	2	1	0	1	7	4	3
(Netherlands Antilles) Hubentut Fortuna	2	1	0	1	2	3	3
(Netherlands Antilles) Dutch Caribbean Stars	2	0	0	1	1	6	0

=== Friendlies ===
27 June 2009	DWV (Netherlands)	1–10	(Netherlands) Ajax	Amsterdam, Netherlands
15:30	Abercrombie 41'	Report	Aissati 20', 86'; Zeegelaar 25'; Donald 51'; Martina 57', 93'; Sno 65'; Bodul 76' (pen.); De Jong 87', 90'	Stadium: Sportpark Elzenhagen; Attendance: 4,000; Referee: Wesley O'Niel

4 July 2009	Ajax (Netherlands)	3–2	(South Africa) Ajax Cape Town	Amsterdam, Netherlands
16:30	Cvitanich 20'; De Jong 49'; Bodul 57'	Report	Vilakazi 74', 85' (pen.)	Stadium: Sportpark De Toekomst; Attendance: 3,750; Referee: Ruud Bossen

7 July 2009	WKE (Netherlands)	1–7	(Netherlands) Ajax	Emmen, Netherlands
19:30	Fik 83'	Report	Bakircioglü 10', 41'; Cvitanich 12', 30', 33' (pen.); Van der Heijden 62'; Bodul 90'	Stadium: Sportpark Grote Geert; Attendance: 4,000; Referee: Ben Haverkort

9 July 2009	HZVV (Netherlands)	0–11	(Netherlands) Ajax	Hoogeveen, Netherlands
19:30		Report	Suárez 8', 20', 59', 74'; Aissati 42', 54'; Bodul 53'; Vertonghen 69', 85'; Van der Wiel 73'; Lindgren 76'	Stadium: Bentinckspark; Attendance: 4,850; Referee: Ben Haverkort

11 July 2009	SV Huizen (Netherlands)	0–6	(Netherlands) Ajax	Huizen, Netherlands
16:15		Report	Cvitanich 7', 53'; Bakircioglü 32'; De Jong 62'; Sno 85'; Bodul 90'	Stadium: De Wolfskamer; Attendance: 4,000; Referee: ?

15 July 2009	Bristol City (England)	0–4	(Netherlands) Ajax	Bristol, England
18.30		Report	Suárez 25'; Emanuelson 35'; Luque 81'; Rommedahl 83'	Stadium: Ashton Gate; Attendance: 10,933; Referee: Stuart Atwell

9 January 2010	Ajax Amateurs (Netherlands)	0–7	(Netherlands) Ajax	Ferreiras, Portugal
16:30		Report	Rommedahl 12'; Donald 15'; Suárez 24' (pen.), 88'; Oleguer 55'; Emanuelson 59'; Pantelić 65'	Stadium: Estádio da Nora; Referee: Wim Bronsvoort

12 January 2010	FC Groningen (Netherlands)	1–1	(Netherlands) Ajax	Alcantarilha, Portugal
16:30	Matavž 14'	Report	Suárez 56'	Stadium: Amendoeira Sportsclub; Attendance: 200; Referee: Gerrit Fikkert

== Transfers for 2009–10 ==
=== Summer transfer window ===
For a list of all Dutch football transfers in the summer window (1 July 2009 to 1 September 2009) please see List of Dutch football transfers summer 2009.

==== Arrivals ====
- The following players moved to AFC Ajax.

	Name	Position	Transfer type	Previous club	Fee
	Return from loan spell				
Substituted on	(Romania) George Ogăraru	Defender	30 June 2009	(Romania) Steaua București	-
Substituted on	(Denmark) Dennis Rommedahl	Forward	30 June 2009	(Netherlands) N.E.C.	-
	Loan				
Substituted on	(Brazil) Zé Eduardo	Midfielder	30 June 2009	(Brazil) Cruzeiro	-
Substituted on	(Brazil) Kerlon	Midfielder	30 June 2009	(Italy) Internazionale	-
	Transfer				
Substituted on	(Netherlands) Jeroen Verhoeven	Goalkeeper	9 July 2009	(Netherlands) FC Volendam	€300,000
Substituted on	(Netherlands) Demy de Zeeuw	Midfielder	25 July 2009	(Netherlands) AZ	€6,5 million
	Free Transfer				
Substituted on	(Cameroon) Timothée Atouba	Midfielder	7 July 2009	(Germany) Hamburger SV	-
Substituted on	(Serbia) Marko Pantelić	Forward	30 August 2009	(Germany) Hertha BSC	-

==== Departures ====
- The following players moved from AFC Ajax.

	Name	Position	Transfer type	New club	Fee
	Out on loan				
Substituted off	(Netherlands) Evander Sno	Midfielder	14 July 2009	(England) Bristol City	-
Substituted off	(Spain) Albert Luque	Forward	30 July 2009	(Spain) Málaga CF	-
Substituted off	(Armenia) Edgar Manucharyan	Forward	6 August 2009	(Netherlands) HFC Haarlem	-
Substituted off	(Croatia) Darko Bodul	Forward	31 August 2009	(Netherlands) Sparta Rotterdam	-
Substituted off	(Netherlands) Jan-Arie van der Heijden	Midfielder	31 August 2009	(Netherlands) Willem II	-
	Transfer				
Substituted off	(Belgium) Thomas Vermaelen	Defender	19 June 2009	(England) Arsenal	€12 million
	Free Transfer				
Substituted off	(Netherlands) Dennis Gentenaar	Goalkeeper	8 June 2009	(Netherlands) VVV-Venlo	-
Substituted off	(Netherlands) Donovan Slijngard	Defender	17 June 2009	(Netherlands) Sparta Rotterdam	-
Substituted off	(Netherlands) Robbert Schilder	Defender	24 June 2009	(Netherlands) NAC Breda	-
Substituted off	(Brazil) Leonardo	Forward	31 August 2009	(Netherlands) NAC Breda	-

==== Winter transfer window ====
For a list of all Dutch football transfers in the winter window (1 January 2010 to 1 February 2010) please see List of Dutch football transfers winter 2009–10.

===== Arrivals =====
- The following players moved to AFC Ajax.

	Name	Position	Transfer type	Previous club	Fee
	Transfer				
Substituted on	(Uruguay) Nicolás Lodeiro	Midfielder	22 January 2010	(Uruguay) Nacional	€4 million
	Free Transfer				
Substituted on	(South Korea) Suk Hyun-Jun	Forward	1 January 2010	(South Korea) Yongin Citizen	–

===== Departures =====
- The following players moved from AFC Ajax.

	Name	Position	Transfer type	New club	Fee
	Out on loan				
Substituted off	(Argentina) Darío Cvitanich	Forward	1 January 2010	(Mexico) Pachuca	-
Substituted off	(Netherlands) Jeffrey Sarpong	Forward	1 January 2010	(Netherlands) N.E.C.	-
Substituted off	(Netherlands) Daley Blind	Defender	5 January 2010	(Netherlands) FC Groningen	-
Substituted off	(Netherlands) Timothy van der Meulen	Defender	15 January 2010	(Netherlands) HFC Haarlem	-
Substituted off	(Netherlands) Tom Overtoom	Midfielder	22 January 2010	(Netherlands) HFC Haarlem	-
Substituted off	(Netherlands Antilles) Javier Martina	Forward	25 January 2010	(Netherlands) HFC Haarlem	-
Substituted off	(Netherlands) Sergio Padt	Goalkeeper	25 January 2010	(Netherlands) HFC Haarlem	-
Substituted off	(Netherlands) Mitchell Donald	Midfielder	29 January 2010	(Netherlands) Willem II	-
Substituted off	(Armenia) Edgar Manucharyan	Forward	1 February 2010	(Netherlands) AGOVV	-
Substituted off	(Uruguay) Bruno Silva	Defender	1 February 2010	(Brazil) Internacional	-
