= Gregory van der Wiel =

Dutch footballer (born 1988)

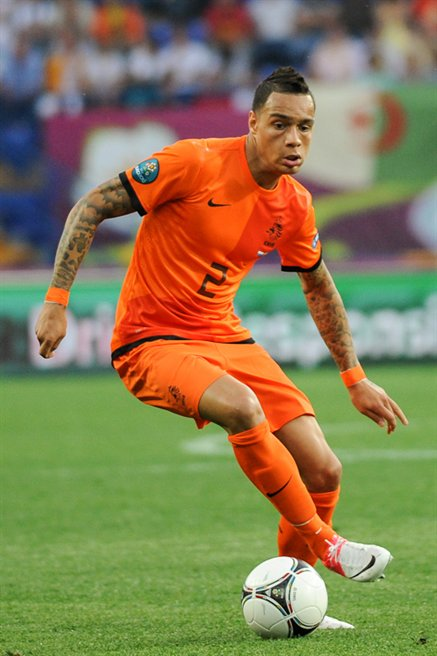
- Van der Wiel playing for the Netherlands at UEFA Euro 2012

Personal information
- Full name: Gregory Kurtley van der Wiel
- Date of birth: 3 February 1988 (age 38)
- Place of birth: Amsterdam, Netherlands
- Height: 1.83 m (6 ft 0 in)
- Position: Right-back

Youth career
- DCG
- 1996–2002: Ajax
- 2002–2005: Haarlem
- 2005–2007: Ajax

Senior career*
Years	Team	Apps	(Gls)
2007–2012	Ajax	130	(12)
2012–2016	Paris Saint-Germain	89	(4)
2016–2017	Fenerbahçe	11	(0)
2017–2018	Cagliari	5	(0)
2018–2019	Toronto FC	27	(0)
Total		262	(16)

International career
2007	Netherlands U19	1	(0)
2008–2009	Netherlands U21	5	(0)
2009–2015	Netherlands	46	(0)
Medal record
Men's football
Representing Netherlands
FIFA World Cup
Runner-up	2010 South Africa
- * Club domestic league appearances and goals

Gregory Kurtley van der Wiel (born 3 February 1988) is a Dutch former professional footballer who played as a right-back.

Born in Amsterdam, Van der Wiel is a product of the AFC Ajax youth system. In 2010, he was awarded the Johan Cruyff Award for "Young Player of the Year" in the Netherlands. He also played for Paris Saint-Germain, Fenerbahçe, Cagliari and Toronto FC.

Van der Wiel made his debut for the Netherlands national team in February 2009 and participated in the Netherlands' runners-up performance at the 2010 FIFA World Cup in South Africa. Dutch teammate John Heitinga has labelled him the spiritual successor of Michael Reiziger for the Netherlands.

== Club career ==
=== Ajax ===
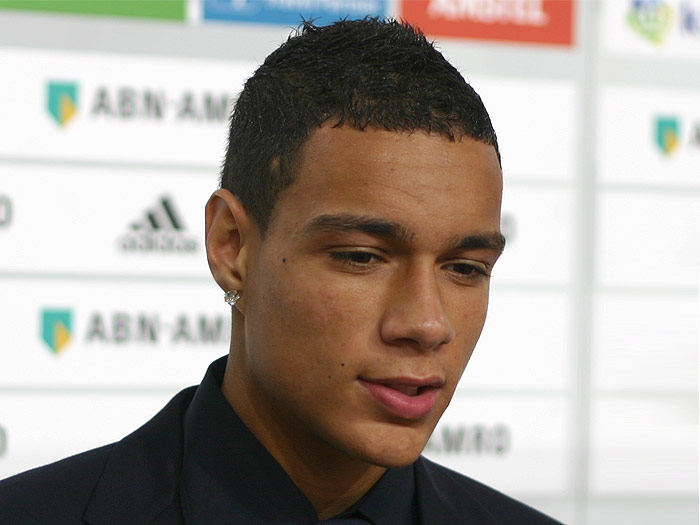
Van der Wiel in 2007

Van der Wiel started his playing career at RKSV DCG in Amsterdam. At age seven, the young defender was scouted by AFC Ajax and brought to the Ajax Academy at "De Toekomst". In 2002, Ajax sent the player away to HFC Haarlem due to the player having a "mentality problem". Talking about his period at Haarlem, Van der Wiel has said, "When I was there I realized how spoiled I was. At Ajax everything was always well organized. We received a new kit every season and were picked up with minivans and brought to the club. At Haarlem I arrived in a totally different world. The accommodation was much worse, we played in five-year-old outfits, and had to find our own way to the trainings. The atmosphere was better though, much more relaxed than at Ajax. The period at Haarlem was good for my social development. It was a wake-up call for me." In 2005, Ajax approached him once again and brought him back to the academy. His second stint at the club proved to be a much more successful experience, resulting in him signing his first professional contract, effectively starting from July 2006. Following the departure of youth captain Donovan Slijngard, Van der Wiel was made captain of Jong Ajax.

Van der Wiel made his professional debut for Ajax on 11 March 2007 in a 4–1 away win against Twente, coming on as a substitute for Jaap Stam. He would play three more matches that season. At the end of the 2006–07 season, Van der Wiel signed a four–year contract with the club, keeping him until 2011.

At the start of the 2007–08 season, Van der Wiel participated in the 1–0 victory over PSV in the battle for the Johan Cruyff Shield, resulting in winning his first career trophy. In a 1–0 win over Dinamo Zagreb in the first round of the UEFA Cup on 20 September 2007, his performance was praised by manager Henk ten Cate. A knee injury kept him out for most of the 2007–08 season.

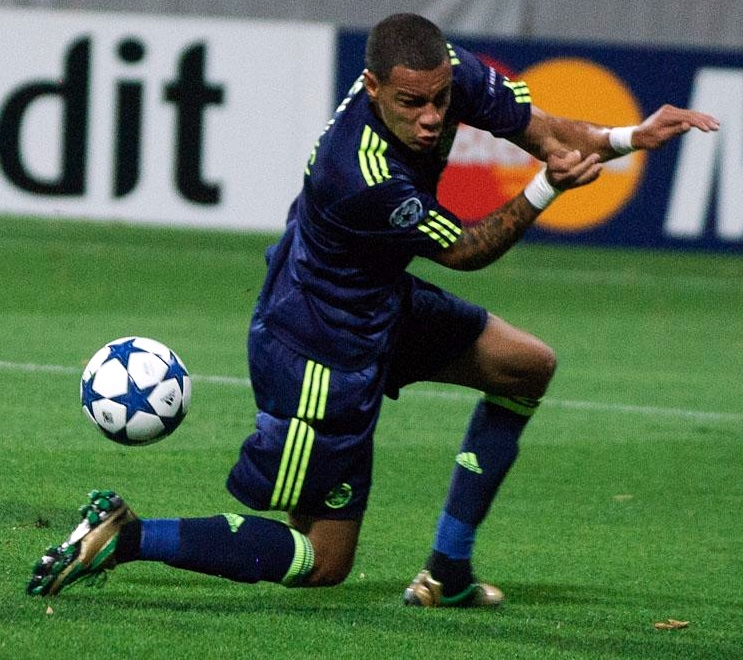
Van der Wiel playing for Ajax in the Champions League campaign in August 2010

In the 2008–09 season, Van der Wiel managed to recovered from the knee injury ahead of the new season and hoped to succeed John Heitinga, who departed for La Liga side Atlético Madrid over the summer. After returning from injury, Van der Wiel regained his first place at the club, playing in the right-back position. At one point, he played in the midfield position due to midfielder crisis. His performances resulted in him signing a contract extension with the club on 28 January 2009, lasting until 2013. He then scored his first goal for the club on 1 March 2009 in a 2–0 win over Utrecht. For his performance in the 2008–09 season, he was awarded AFC Ajax's Talent of the Year.

Ahead of the 2009–10 season, Van der Wiel switched shirt number from 15 to 2. His performance attracted interests from Premier League side Manchester City. On 24 January 2010, he scored his fourth goal of the season in a 1–0 win over AZ. He, once again, helped the club keep six clean sheets between 3 February 2010 and 7 March 2010. Van der Wiel played as a right–back in both legs of the 2009–10 KNVBCup final, as the club beat Feyenoord 4–2 to win the tournament. For his performances during the season, he was awarded the Johan Cruijff Award for "Young Player of the Year."

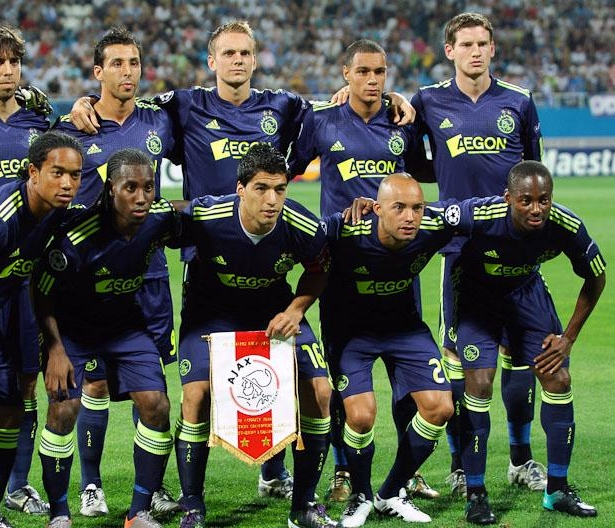
Van der Wiel (second from top right) with Ajax teammates in 2010

Following the 2010 World Cup, Van der Wiel was in talks to transfer to Louis van Gaal's Bayern Munich. However, Ajax was not able to agree to a deal. The 2010–11 season was another successful season for Van der Wiel, as he maintained his first-team position under new manager Frank de Boer. Despite some setbacks, Van der Wiel continued to regain his first team place at right-back. After being linked with a move to Manchester City and Barcelona in the January transfer window, he ended the transfer speculation by declaring his intention to stay at the club. In the final of the KNVB Cup against FC Twente, he started the match in the right–back and played 91 minutes before being substituted, as the club lost 3–2.

During the 2011–12 season, Van der Wiel suffered a groin injury on two occasions, which affected his season. He returned to training after two months sidelined.

Ahead of the 2012–13 season, Van der Wiel continued to be linked a move away from Ajax, and he made it clear he was not keen on signing a new contract with Ajax in January 2012. He missed the Johan Cruyff Shield, After a 5–0 win over NAC Breda on 25 August 2012, in what was his last appearance for Ajax, Van der Wiel hinted at his departure from the club. His departure became imminent after Ajax agreed to sell Van der Wiel to French Ligue 1 club Paris Saint-Germain.

=== Paris Saint-Germain ===
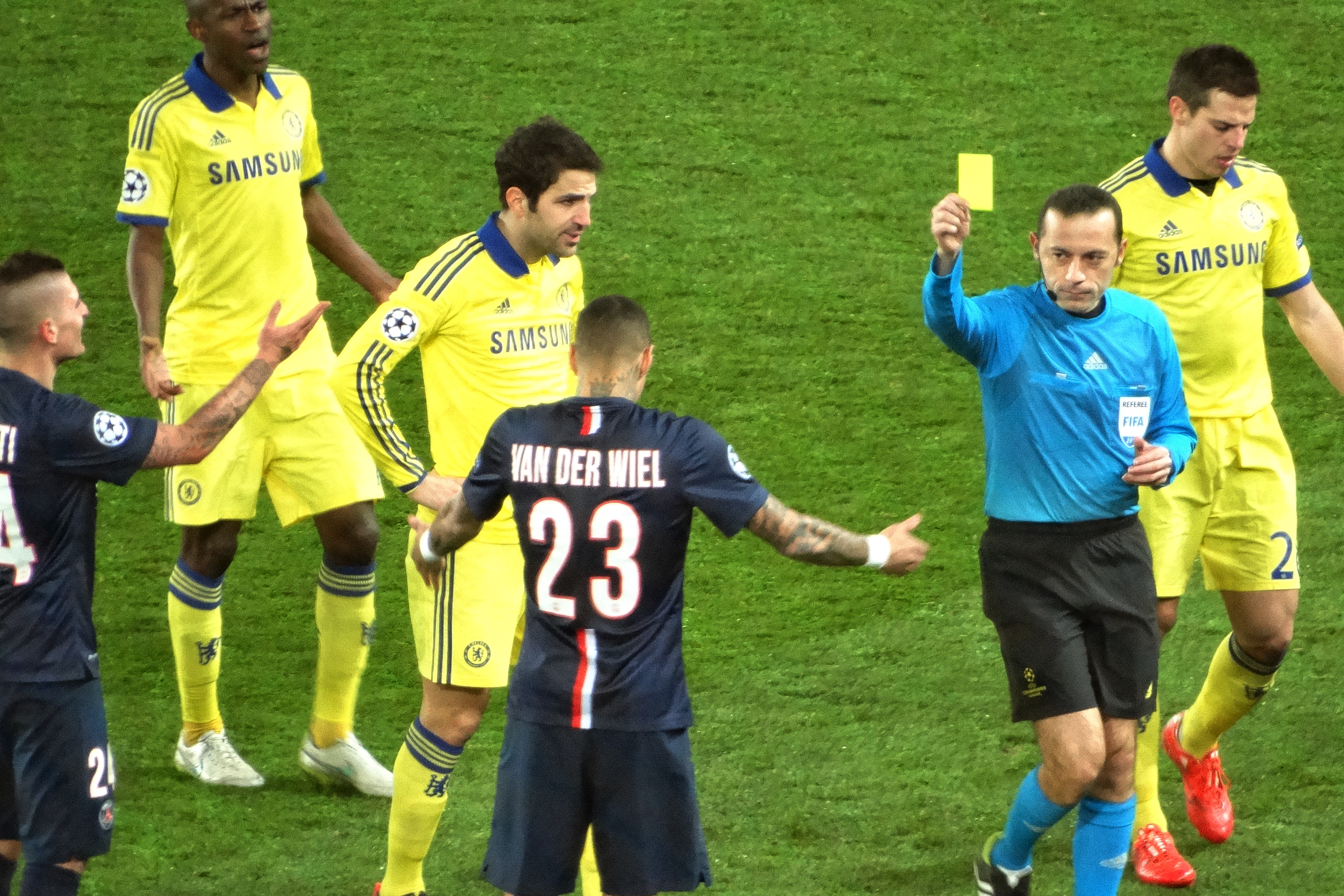
Van der Wiel booked during a 1–1 draw against Chelsea in the UEFA Champions League match

Van der Wiel moved to Paris Saint-Germain on 1 September 2012 for a reported €6 million transfer fee. The move was confirmed two days later, when he was issued the number 23 shirt and signed a four-year contract lasting until 2016.

Van der Wiel made his PSG debut on 22 September 2012 in an away match against Bastia, a 0–4 victory; Van der Wiel played the full 90 minutes at right-back. For the most part of his debut season in France, Van der Wiel would come off the substitutes' bench for PSG captain Christophe Jallet, the team's first-choice right-back. Van der Wiel made his European debut for Paris in the 2012–13 UEFA Champions League match against Porto, a 1–0 away loss, with Van der Wiel being substituted off for Jallet in the 66th minute. Van der Wiel scored his first PSG goal in the 0–4 away win against Toulouse, the final goal of the match. On 12 May 2013, PSG became champions of France, winning the 2013–14 Ligue 1 title in a 1–0 victory against Lyon at home, marking the club's third ever national championship. Van der Wiel remained on the substitutes' bench for the duration of the title-winning fixture.

At the start of the 2013–14 season, Van der Wiel was linked a move away from the club, as Italian Serie A club Internazionale were interested in signing him. Although a transfer never materialized, he remained at the club and found himself in competition with Christophe Jallet at right-back. As a result, Van der Wiel and Jallet often rotated in the position. Towards the end of the season, he suffered injuries on two occasions. He earned first-team status at PSG and saw him included in the L'Equipe Team of the Year for 2013.

At the start of the 2014–15 season, Van der Wiel played the entire match in the Trophée des Champions, a 2–0 PSG win over Guingamp. After Christophe Jallet's transfer to Lyon, Van der Wiel continued to feature at right-back, although he faced a new competition from new signings Serge Aurier and Jordan Ikoko, which often forced him to the substitutes' bench. By season's end, Van der Wiel helped PSG win the domestic treble: Ligue 1, Coupe de France and the Coupe de la Ligue.

In the 2015–16 season, Van der Wiel regularly found himself on the substitutes' bench, behind Serge Aurier and Marquinhos at right-back. He also faced with his own injury concerns in the first half of the season. For the third time, he helped the club win the domestic Treble: Ligue 1, Coupe de France and the Coupe de la Ligue.

On 15 May 2016, it was officially announced Van der Wiel would be leaving PSG at the end season after his contract expired. This was announced after he acknowledged it would be difficult to stay at the club.

=== Fenerbahçe ===
After leaving Paris Saint-Germain, Van der Wiel signed for Turkish team Fenerbahçe, signing a three-year contract with an option to extend for an additional year. Upon joining the club, he was joined up by compatriot Robin van Persie.

Van der Wiel made his official debut for Fenerbahçe on 27 July 2016 in the third qualifying round of UEFA Champions League, where he set up a goal for Emmanuel Emenike in a 2–1 home win over Monaco. However, in the second-leg, the club was eliminated from the competition following a 3–1 away defeat. He then made his Fenerbahçe debut on 21 August 2016 in the opening match of the 2016–17 Süper Lig season, where he started the entire match in a 1–0 loss to İstanbul Başakşehir. His lack of first-team opportunities at the club led manager Dick Advocaat to be keen on selling him in January, although a transfer was never agreed and he remained at the club until the end of the season. For Fenerbahçe, Van der Wiel made 12 league appearances and 17 across all competitions. This was due to injuries and suspension throughout the 2016–17 season.

=== Cagliari ===
After only one season with Fenerbahçe, on 25 August 2017, Van der Wiel joined Italian club Cagliari. In so doing, he became the first Dutchman to ever sign for the club. He was issued the number 2 shirt by the Sardinian side. He made his debut in a 3–2 home loss to Genoa on 15 October, having missed the first six matches of the season through injury. However, after returning from injury, he still struggled to earn playing time during the first half of the season, making only six appearances across all competitions.

=== Toronto FC ===
On 1 February 2018, Van der Wiel signed with Major League Soccer (MLS) club Toronto FC. Upon joining the club, he was issued the number 9 shirt during an introductory press conference.

He made his club debut on 3 March in the opening match of the MLS season, a 2–0 home defeat to Columbus Crew. Despite suffering from setbacks that saw him on the sidelines, Van der Wiel established himself in the starting eleven for the side. He then played in both legs of 2018 CONCACAF Champions League Final against Chivas Guadalajara, as Toronto eventually lost the final 4–2 in a penalty shoot-out after the series was tied 3–3 on aggregate. During the season, Van der Wiel played in several different positions for the side, such as centre-back, left-back, and right-midfield. But most of the season, he played in the right-back position. During a preseason training session in Los Angeles on 23 January 2019, Van der Wiel was dismissed after an altercation with coach Greg Vanney. On 22 March 2019, he was released by the club by mutual consent.

On 6 August 2020, Van der Wiel began training with Eredivisie club RKC Waalwijk. Shortly after, he reiterated that he wanted to continue playing football, having been a free agent for a year. As a result, Van der Wiel spent months on a trial with the club.

== International career ==
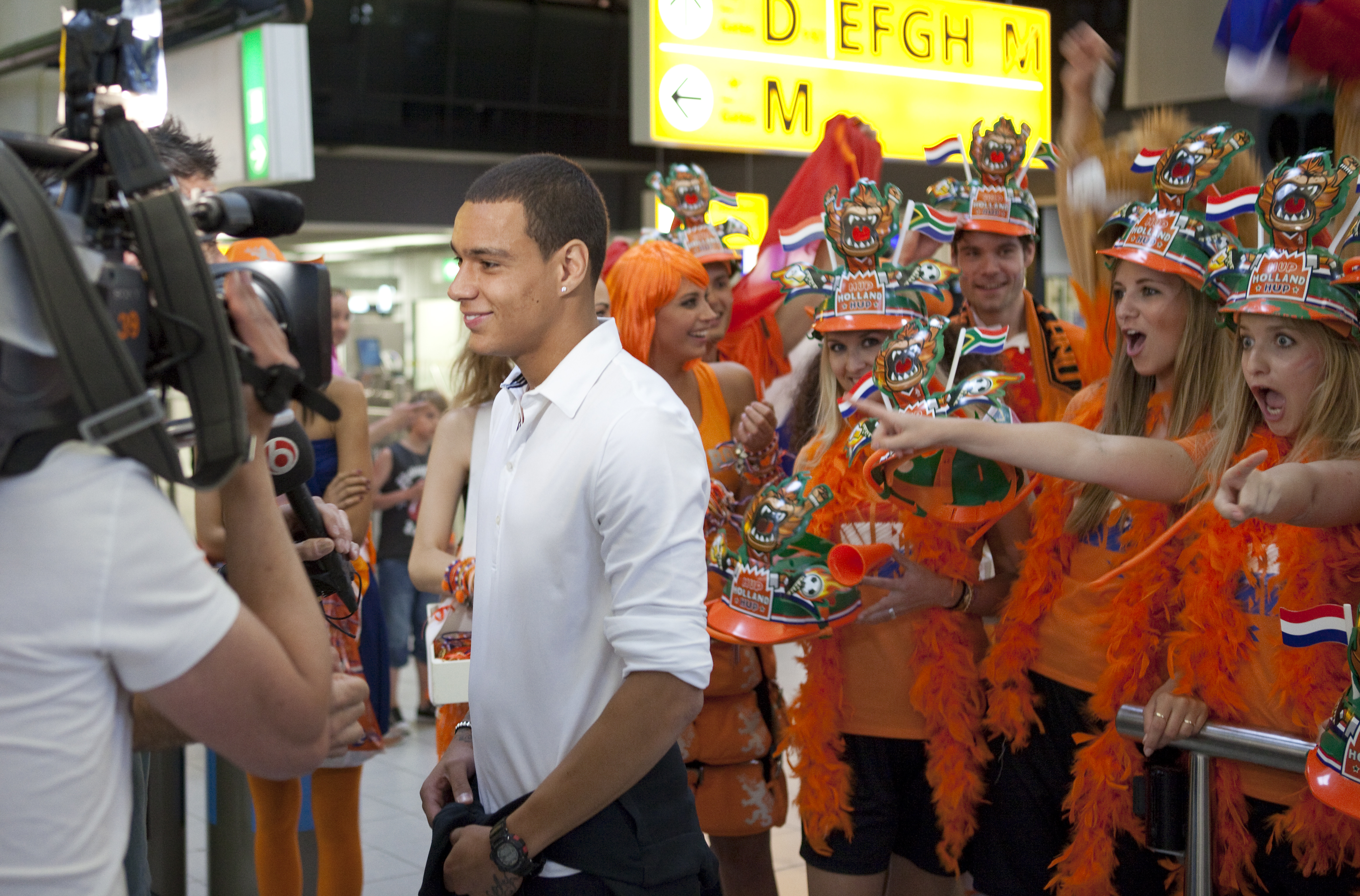
Van der Wiel with Dutch fans

=== Youth career ===
After previously representing the Netherlands under-19 national team, Van der Wiel has been capped at the under-21 level and participated at the 2007 Toulon Tournament.

Although he recovered from the knee injury, Van der Wiel did not make the final Dutch squad for the Olympic Games in Beijing, following which he was disappointed and critical of manager Foppe de Haan's decision. Later in 2008, Van der Wiel featured two more times for the under-21 side.

In November 2008, Van der Wiel was initially included in the Netherlands' B-team squad for their match against the Sweden national under-21 team. However, he was replaced by Rens van Eijden due to a groin injury sustained during training.

=== Senior career ===
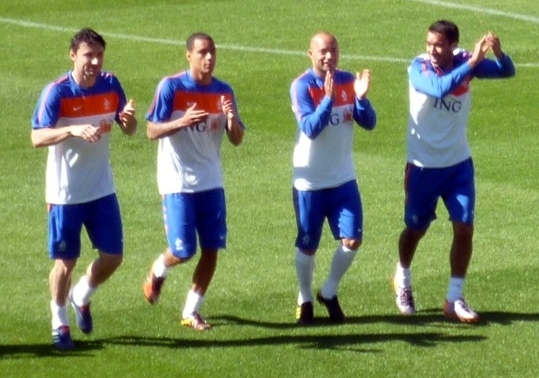
Van der Wiel (second from left) with (from left to right) Mark van Bommel, Demy de Zeeuw and Giovanni van Bronckhorst

On 6 February 2009, Van der Wiel was called up by the senior Dutch team for the first time. He then made his senior debut on 11 February as a substitute for former Ajax teammate John Heitinga in the friendly match against Tunisia. He made his first competitive debut on 28 March 2009 as a starter in a 3–0 2010 FIFA World Cup qualification victory over Scotland. He again played the entire match for the 4–0 World Cup qualification victory over Macedonia on 1 April 2009.

==== Twitter incident ====
In October 2009, Van der Wiel became embroiled in a controversy after he was unable to travel with the Dutch squad to Australia for a friendly match due to a concussion sustained while playing for Ajax. However, Van der Wiel later attended a Lil Wayne concert and posted a picture of himself with the rapper on his Twitter page. Several prominent figures in Dutch football criticised the player for his actions, including Dutch coach Bert van Marwijk, who said, "It's rather strange that he was able to go to a concert, given that he told me that he was not allowed to fly by the Ajax medical staff." Ajax manager Martin Jol defended the player, saying the incident was blown out of proportion by the media and that it should not be seen as a lack of respect on the part of the player for the Netherlands national team. Van Marwijk has since forgiven Van der Wiel for the incident, saying, "[H]e should not expect that this incident will have consequences for his place in the team."

==== 2010 World Cup ====
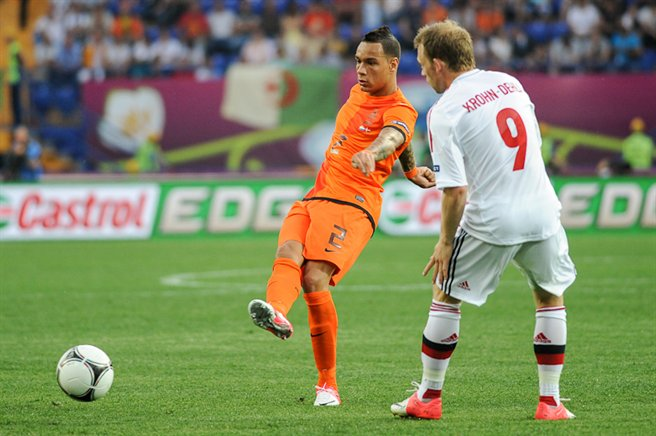
Van der Wiel and Michael Krohn-Dehli at Euro 2012

Van der Wiel was actively involved in the Netherlands' 2010 World Cup qualification campaign, having competed with John Heitinga for the starting right-back position. After the Netherlands secured qualification to the tournament proper, Van der Wiel was named to the 23-man squad by manager Bert van Marwijk. He previously aimed for his goal to make a selection for the World Cup squad prior to that.

The player was in the starting line-up for their first two matches in the competition, 2–0 victory over Denmark and 1–0 victory over Japan. After missing two matches, Van der Wiel returned to the starting lineup for the match against Slovakia in the round of 16 on 28 June 2010. After the match, Van der Wiel said that although he was concerned at receiving a second yellow card, he was unhappy with his performance, describing it as his "least match so far".

Van der Wiel also started in the quarter-final against Brazil, which saw the Dutch win 2–1 to send them through to the semi-final for the first time since the 1998 World Cup. However, he was once again suspended for the semi-final after he was booked for the second time in the tournament. After the match, he acknowledged his fault in receiving the yellow card.

Van der Wiel returned to the squad for the final against Spain, where he started and played all 120 minutes of the match as the Dutch lost following a late goal by Andrés Iniesta in extra time. In total, Van der Wiel made four appearances during the World Cup campaign. At the end of 2010, Van der Wiel said about the World Cup: "The final was so beautiful, the stadium was very big and you only saw flashes of the cameras in the audience." I feel honored to have played the final. As a young boy, it is of course beautiful. Previously, it was a dream, now I have experienced it myself."

==== Euro 2012 ====
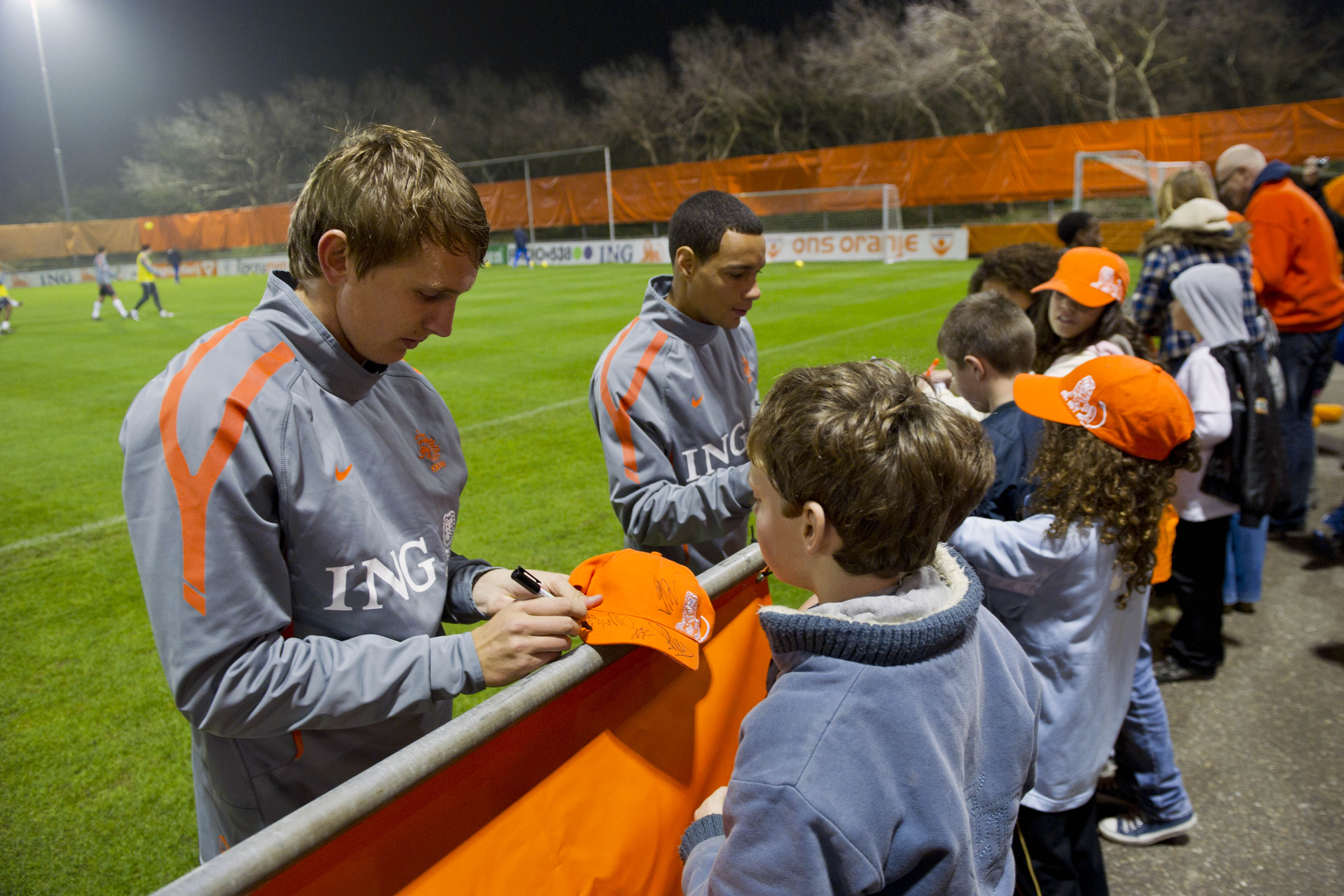
Van der Wiel signing autographs along with Luuk de Jong while on international duty

Van der Wiel was Bert van Marwijk's first-choice right-back for the Netherlands' UEFA Euro 2012 qualifying Group E matches. He started the Oranje's qualifying campaign well when he set up a Ruud van Nistelrooy goal against San Marino, the Netherlands' fifth goal in a 5–0 win on matchday 1. Van der Wiel also set-up two goals for Robin van Persie and Ibrahim Afellay to help the Netherlands defeat Hungary on 25 March 2011. He then made his 25th international appearance on 2 September 2011 in an 11–0 win over San Marino.

In late May 2012, Van der Wiel was named to Van Marwijk's 23-man squad for the final tournament, held in Poland and Ukraine. However, at Euro 2012, Van der Wiel was widely criticized for his performances, notably a back-pass against Portugal in the first-half which presented Hélder Postiga with a clear sight of goal, though Postiga missed the opportunity.

=== Later Netherlands career ===
Following the arrival of new Dutch team manager Louis van Gaal after Euro 2012, Van der Wiel was rarely featured for the remainder of 2012, despite his determination to fight for his place in the squad. One year later, in November 2013, he was recalled for the first time and played his first match since Euro 2012, starting and playing the entire match at right-back in a 0–0 draw against Colombia on 19 November 2013. However, due to an injury sustained at Paris Saint-Germain towards the end of the 2013–14 season, Van der Wiel was omitted from the 23-man Dutch squad for the 2014 FIFA World Cup in Brazil. In response from the World Cup, Van der Wiel said it didn't work out, due to his ongoing injuries.

== Playing style ==
A versatile defender, Van der Wiel usually played as an attacking right-back or wing-back and is known for his speedy runs down the flank, as well as his defensive skills, ability on the ball and distribution. He is also capable of playing as a wide midfielder on either flank, or even as a centre-back.

== Personal life ==
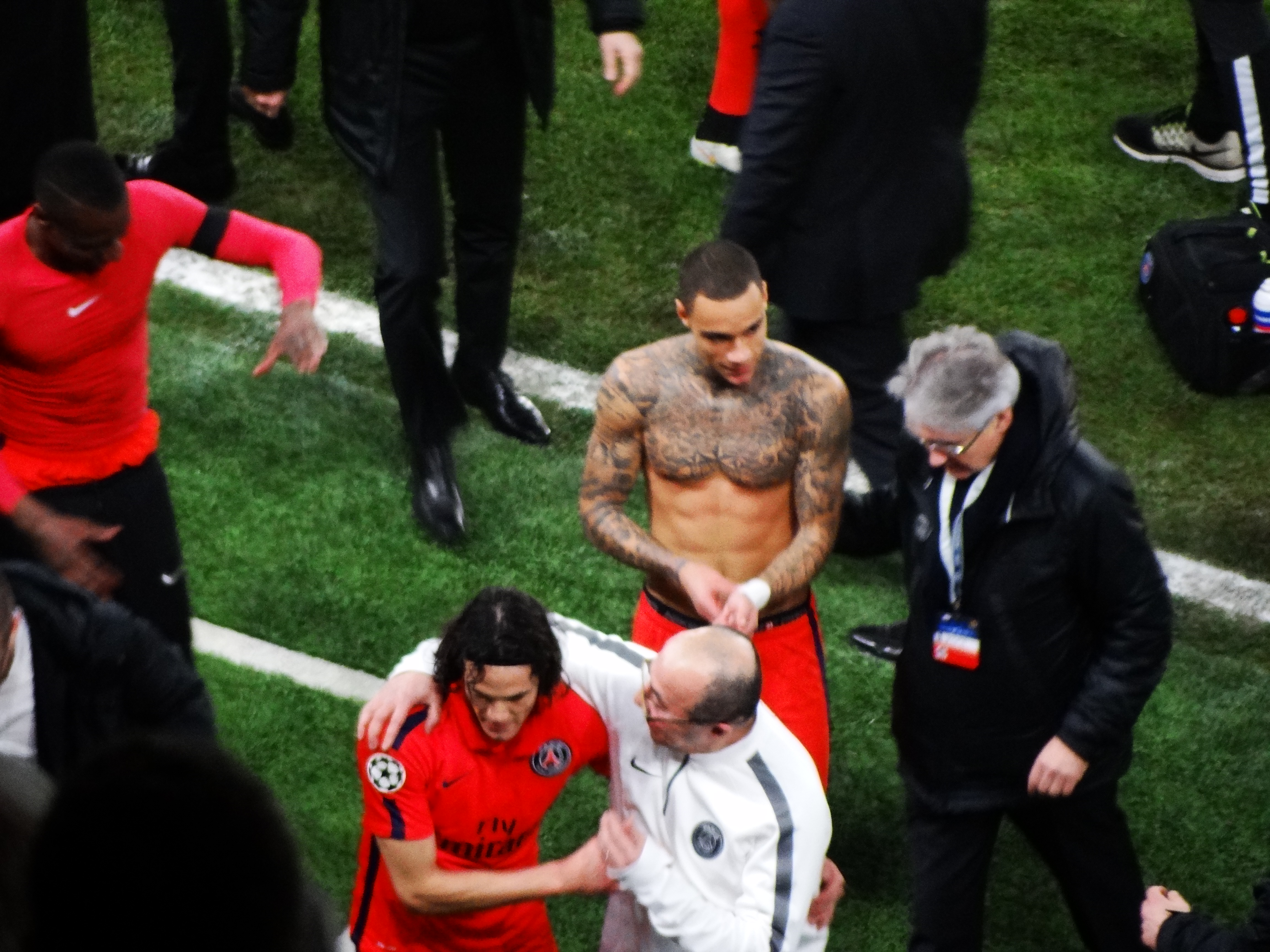
Van der Wiel and his tattoos while playing for Paris Saint-Germain

Born in Amsterdam, Van der Wiel has a Dutch-Antillean father from Curaçao and a Dutch mother. He has three younger sisters: Layla, Ambar and Hind. When asked about his religion, he said, "I believe in God, but do not believe in faith. I keep my superstition for myself." Van der Wiel is friends with footballers Hurşut Meriç, having grown up together in Amsterdam, and Jan-Arie van der Heijden, having known each other at their early careers at Ajax.

Van der Wiel has numerous tattoos of which he said, "[I] have two quotes (pronouns), my mother's name, my father's initials, the first letters of the names of my sisters, some decorations and my own name, that was my first tattoo. My parents thought eighteen was a good age for my first tattoo.. But they would rather not see me get a tattoo. Nowadays you see children getting tattooed at an earlier age. I think eighteen is a good age myself." He has also said hip hop is his culture.

In November 2009, Van der Wiel donated money to help Dutch club HFC Haarlem in its financial difficulties. However, his efforts were ultimately unsuccessful as the club declared bankruptcy on 25 January 2010. Later in 2010, the Johan Cruyff Foundation dedicated a "Cruyff Court" in Van der Wiel's name. Van der Wiel had the court built in the Sapaté district in Curaçao—where his family is from—which was officially opened on 15 June 2011.

In August 2015, Van der Wiel was a victim of a robbery after thieves broke into his apartment and stole his luxury watches. In May 2017, he also revealed he was a victim of a scam by businessman Ümit Akbulut after Van der Wiel gave him $4.5 million. Upon joining Toronto FC, Van der Wiel reflected on the incident: "I met somebody there, influential, and I wanted to invest some money, like I'm still doing to this day. I like to do things on the side of football to be smart about my money, but it was not a smart move. I trusted somebody and in the end, I never saw my money back."

Van der Wiel lived with his then girlfriend, Belgian model Rose Bertram in Los Angeles. Their daughter, Naleya Rose, was born on 24 February 2018 in Toronto.

In November 2020, Van der Wiel spoke about mental health, having been dealing with panic attacks and feelings of anxiety for over a year.

== Career statistics ==
=== Club ===
Appearances and goals by club, season and competition
Club	Season	League			National Cup		Continental		Other		Total	
Club	Season	Division	Apps	Goals	Apps	Goals	Apps	Goals	Apps	Goals	Apps	Goals
Ajax	2006–07	Eredivisie	4	0	0	0	0	0	1 (Note: Appearance in Eredivisie European play-offs)	0	5	0
Ajax	2007–08	Eredivisie	6	0	2	0	2 (Note: Appearances in UEFA Cup)	0	1 (Note: Appearance in Johan Cruyff Shield)	0	11	0
Ajax	2008–09	Eredivisie	32	2	2	0	9	0	—		43	2
Ajax	2009–10	Eredivisie	34	6	6	0	10 (Note: Appearances in UEFA Europa League)	0	—		50	6
Ajax	2010–11	Eredivisie	32	1	5	0	14 (Note: Ten appearances in UEFA Champions League, four appearances in UEFA Europa League)	0	1	0	52	1
Ajax	2011–12	Eredivisie	19	2	1	0	6 (Note: Appearances in UEFA Champions League)	1	1	0	27	3
Ajax	2012–13	Eredivisie	3	1	0	0	0	0	—		3	1
Ajax	Total		130	12	16	0	41	1	4	0	191	13
Paris Saint-Germain	2012–13	Ligue 1	22	1	2	0	5	0	—		29	1
Paris Saint-Germain	2013–14	Ligue 1	25	0	2	0	6	0	2 (Note: Appearances in Coupe de la Ligue)	0	35	0
Paris Saint-Germain	2014–15	Ligue 1	25	1	5	0	10	0	1 (Note: Appearance in Trophée des Champions)	0	41	1
Paris Saint-Germain	2015–16	Ligue 1	17	2	2	0	6	0	2	0	27	2
Paris Saint-Germain	Total		89	4	11	0	27	0	5	0	132	4
Fenerbahçe	2016–17	Süper Lig	11	0	1	0	5 (Note: Two appearances in UEFA Champions League, three appearances in UEFA Europa League)	0	—		17	0
Cagliari	2017–18	Serie A	5	0	1	0	—		—		6	0
Toronto FC	2018	MLS	27	0	0	0	6 (Note: Appearances in CONCACAF Champions League)	0	1 (Note: Appearance in Campeones Cup)	0	34	0
Career total			262	16	29	0	79	1	10	0	380	17

=== International ===
Appearances and goals by national team and year
National team	Year	Apps	Goals
Netherlands	2009	8	0
Netherlands	2010	12	0
Netherlands	2011	9	0
Netherlands	2012	6	0
Netherlands	2013	1	0
Netherlands	2014	5	0
Netherlands	2015	5	0
Total		46	0

== Honours ==
Ajax

- Eredivisie: 2010–11, 2011–12
- KNVB Cup: 2006–07, 2009–10
- Johan Cruyff Shield: 2007

Paris Saint-Germain

- Ligue 1: 2012–13, 2013–14, 2014–15, 2015–16
- Coupe de France: 2014–15, 2015–16
- Coupe de la Ligue: 2013–14, 2014–15, 2015–16
- Trophée des Champions: 2013, 2014, 2015

Toronto FC

- Canadian Championship: 2018
- CONCACAF Champions League runner-up: 2018

Netherlands

- FIFA World Cup runner-up: 2010

Individual

- Johan Cruyff Trophy: 2009–10
- Ajax Talent of the Year (Marco van Basten Award): 2008–09
