= Marvin Zeegelaar =

Dutch footballer (born 1990)

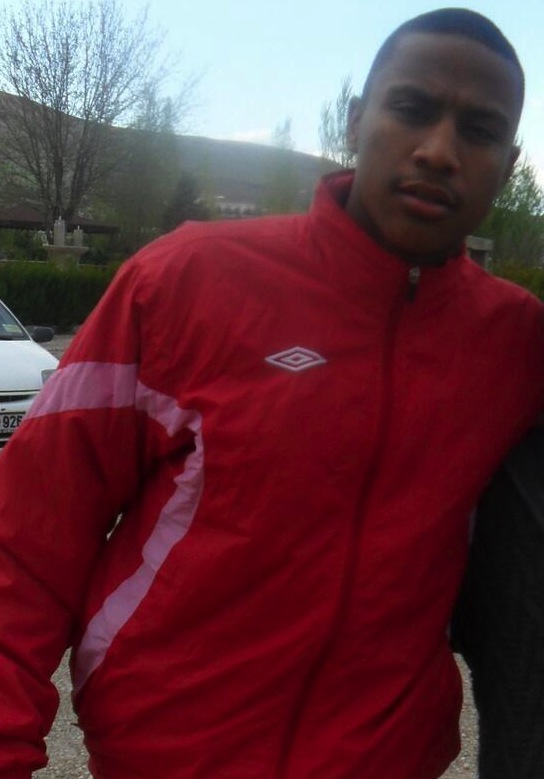
- Zeegelaar in 2013

Personal information
- Full name: Marvin Romeo Kwasie Zeegelaar
- Date of birth: 12 August 1990 (age 36)
- Place of birth: Amsterdam, Netherlands
- Height: 1.86 m (6 ft 1 in)
- Positions: Left-back; midfielder

Youth career
- Real Sranang
- Zeeburgia
- OSV
- 2002–2006: Volendam
- 2006–2009: Ajax

Senior career*
Years	Team	Apps	(Gls)
2009–2011	Ajax	4	(0)
2011	→ Excelsior (loan)	12	(0)
2011–2012	Espanyol B	5	(0)
2012–2014	Elazığspor	34	(0)
2013	→ Blackpool (loan)	2	(0)
2014–2015	Rio Ave	37	(4)
2016–2017	Sporting CP	31	(0)
2017–2020	Watford	12	(0)
2019	→ Udinese (loan)	12	(0)
2020–2022	Udinese	51	(1)
2023	Udinese	7	(1)
Total		207	(6)
- * Club domestic league appearances and goals

Marvin Romeo Kwasie Zeegelaar (born 12 August 1990) is a Dutch former professional footballer who played as a left-back or a left midfielder.

== Club career ==
=== Early years ===
Born in Amsterdam of Surinamese descent, Zeegelaar finished his youth career with local AFC Ajax. He made his competitive debut on 12 November 2008, coming on as a substitute for Siem de Jong in a 1–0 away loss against FC Volendam in the third round of the KNVB Cup.

In the 2011 January transfer window, Zeegelaar was loaned to fellow Eredivisie club Excelsior Rotterdam, appearing regularly and helping his team avoid relegation in the playoffs. In the summer, he signed a four-year contract with RCD Espanyol in Spain, being assigned to the B reserves.

Zeegelaar joined Süper Lig side Elazığspor in 2012. In September of the following year, he moved to Blackpool of the English Championship on loan.

=== Portugal ===
In the summer of 2014, Zeegelaar signed a two-year contract with Rio Ave F.C. from the Portuguese Primeira Liga. He made his debut in the competition on 21 September, playing the second half of the 1–2 home defeat to F.C. Arouca. He finished his first season with 25 matches and one goal, helping to a final tenth position.

With only six months to go before he became a free agent, Rio Ave accepted Sporting CP's bid of €400.000 in November 2015, and Zeegelaar penned a three-and-a-half-year deal which became effective in the following transfer window. In his only full season, he made 26 appearances in all competitions to help to a final third position, battling for position with Brazilian Jefferson.

=== Watford ===
On 31 August 2017, Watford signed Zeegelaar on a four-year contract. He made his Premier League debut on 19 November, playing the full 90 minutes in a 2–0 home win over West Ham United.

=== Udinese ===
Zeegelaar joined Italian Serie A team Udinese Calcio on 10 January 2019, on a five-month loan. One year later, he agreed to a permanent deal running until 30 June 2022.

On 7 March 2023, after being without a club for half a year, Zeegelaar returned to the Stadio Friuli on a deal until the end of the campaign.

== International career ==
In November 2016, 26-year-old Zeegelaar received his first call-up to the senior Netherlands squad, for matches against Belgium and Luxembourg.

== Career statistics ==
Appearances and goals by club, season and competition
Club	Season	League			National cup		League cup		Other		Total	
Club	Season	Division	Apps	Goals	Apps	Goals	Apps	Goals	Apps	Goals	Apps	Goals
Ajax	2008–09	Eredivisie	0	0	1	0	—		0	0	1	0
Ajax	2009–10	Eredivisie	2	0	0	0	—		1 (Note: Appearance in UEFA Europa League)	0	3	0
Ajax	2010–11	Eredivisie	2	0	0	0	—		0	0	2	0
Ajax	Total		4	0	1	0	—		1	0	6	0
Excelsior (loan)	2010–11	Eredivisie	12	0	0	0	—		4 (Note: Appearances in Eredivisie relegation play-offs)	0	16	0
Espanyol B	2011–12	Tercera División	5	0	0	0	—		0	0	5	0
Elazığspor	2012–13	Süper Lig	19	0	2	0	—		0	0	21	0
Elazığspor	2013–14	Süper Lig	15	0	3	0	—		0	0	18	0
Elazığspor	Total		34	0	5	0	—		0	0	39	0
Blackpool (loan)	2013–14	Championship	2	0	0	0	0	0	0	0	2	0
Rio Ave	2014–15	Primeira Liga	25	1	5	0	6	0	0	0	36	1
Rio Ave	2015–16	Primeira Liga	12	3	2	0	1	0	0	0	15	3
Rio Ave	Total		37	4	7	0	7	0	0	0	51	4
Sporting CP	2015–16	Primeira Liga	11	0	0	0	2	1	0	0	13	1
Sporting CP	2016–17	Primeira Liga	20	0	1	0	0	0	5 (Note: Appearances in UEFA Champions League)	0	26	0
Sporting CP	Total		31	0	1	0	2	1	5	0	39	1
Watford	2017–18	Premier League	12	0	0	0	0	0	—		12	0
Udinese	2018–19	Serie A	12	0	0	0	—		—		12	0
Udinese	2019–20	Serie A	13	0	0	0	—		—		13	0
Udinese	2020–21	Serie A	24	1	1	0	—		—		25	1
Udinese	2021–22	Serie A	14	0	2	0	—		—		16	0
Udinese	2022–23	Serie A	7	1	0	0	—		—		7	1
Udinese	Total		70	2	3	0	—		—		73	2
Career total			207	6	17	0	9	1	10	0	243	7
