= Siem de Jong =

Dutch footballer (born 1989)

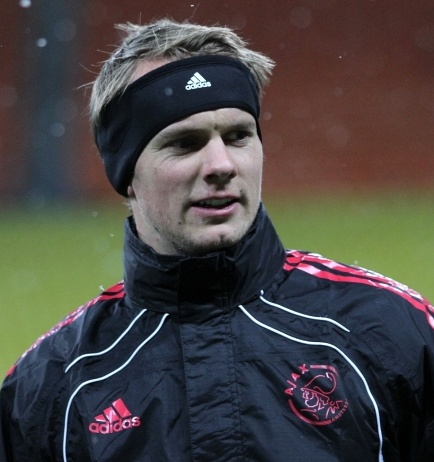
- De Jong with Ajax in 2011

Personal information
- Full name: Siem Stefan de Jong
- Date of birth: 28 January 1989 (age 37)
- Place of birth: Aigle, Switzerland
- Height: 1.85 m (6 ft 1 in)
- Positions: Attacking midfielder; striker

Youth career
- DZC '68
- 2001–2005: De Graafschap
- 2005–2007: Ajax

Senior career*
Years	Team	Apps	(Gls)
2007–2014	Ajax	168	(57)
2014–2017	Newcastle United	22	(1)
2016–2017	→ PSV (loan)	19	(6)
2017–2020	Ajax	25	(4)
2018–2019	→ Sydney FC (loan)	17	(4)
2020	FC Cincinnati	15	(0)
2020–2022	Heerenveen	46	(4)
2022–2023	De Graafschap	26	(5)
Total		342	(83)

International career
2006	Netherlands U17	1	(0)
2007	Netherlands U19	6	(2)
2007–2010	Netherlands U21	12	(4)
2008–2009	Netherlands B	3	(1)
2010–2013	Netherlands	6	(2)
- * Club domestic league appearances and goals

Siem Stefan de Jong (Dutch pronunciation: [ˈsim də ˈjɔŋ]; born 28 January 1989) is a former professional footballer who played as an attacking midfielder or striker. Born in Switzerland, he played for the Netherlands national team.

Playing in the youth academies of De Graafschap and Ajax, he made his professional debut for the Amsterdam-based side and would go on to become the club's captain as they won a club-record four consecutive Eredivisie titles from 2011 to 2014.

Following a three-year spell with Premier League side Newcastle United and a loan spell with PSV Eindhoven, De Jong returned to Ajax in 2017.

His younger brother Luuk de Jong is also a professional football player, currently playing for Porto.

== Early life ==
De Jong was born in Aigle, Switzerland to Dutch parents who played professional volleyball in Switzerland and moved back to the Netherlands when De Jong was six.

== Club career ==
=== Early career ===
De Jong began his football career at the Doetinchem amateur club DZC'68 and was scouted by De Graafschap, when he was 12. He grew up in Doetinchem and graduated from the same school (het Rietveld Lyceum) as Guus Hiddink, Paul Bosvelt and Klaas-Jan Huntelaar, which grants him immediate university access (he has considered studying economics). He played with De Graafschap until 2005, when he was picked up by the Ajax youth academy.

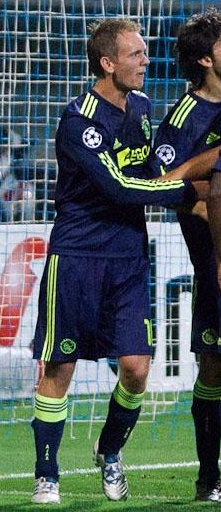
Siem de Jong in action for Ajax

=== Ajax ===
De Jong made his first team debut coming on as a substitute on 26 September 2007 against Kozakken Boys. His Eredivisie debut was also as a substitute, away at Sparta Rotterdam, where he scored an injury-time equaliser. In 2007–08, he was one of the youngest players and the only player under age 20 to play more than 20 games. On 16 January, just before turning 19, he extended his contract with Ajax to June 2013. He picked up an injury against Willem II, missing two months. This made him miss all the games from 16 March onward, including matches against PSV, Twente and Heerenveen. He recovered from this injury in early April, returning fit for the match against De Graafschap. Although he did not start that game, he was substituted on in the 81st minute for Edgar Davids.

During the beginning of the 2009–10, De Jong was often used as an impact substitute and only started in UEFA Europa League games. He eventually earned his place in the starting XI. In January, he scored the winner in the last few minutes of extra time to send Ajax through to the semifinals of the KNVB Cup. On 21 February, he scored a brace against Vitesse in a 4–0 win to keep Ajax's push for UEFA Champions League qualification alive.

On 15 May 2011, De Jong played in the title-decider game against Twente and helped Ajax win its first—and 30th overall—Eredivisie title since 2004 by scoring two goals, sealing the 3–1 victory.

In the 2011–12 season, De Jong often found himself playing as a striker due to several injuries to the natural strikers on the Ajax roster. On 11 April 2012, he scored a hat-trick as Ajax defeated ten-man Heerenveen 5−0 in the 29th league game of the season and moved three points clear of second-placed AZ in the Eredivisie table. De Jong scored both goals against VVV Venlo on 2 May 2012, helping Ajax retain the Eredivisie title.

In the summer of 2012, following the departure of teammate and captain Jan Vertonghen to Tottenham Hotspur, De Jong was appointed as the new Ajax captain. He was in fine form in the 2012–13 Champions League, scoring once at home to English Champions Manchester City and scored twice away from home in the same fixture on 6 November 2012. On 17 March 2013, De Jong netted a brace in a 2–3 defeat of AZ at the AFAS Stadion in Alkmaar.

On 27 July 2013, De Jong scored a goal in the 107th minute as Ajax defeated AZ by a score of 3–2 in the 2013 Johan Cruyff Shield. He scored a goal in either half as Ajax defeated NEC 3−0 on 10 November in the 13th round of Eredivisie play.

=== Newcastle United ===
On 1 July 2014, De Jong signed a six-year deal with Newcastle United for a fee believed to be around £6 million. Following his signing for the club, De Jong was named as a vice-captain by manager Alan Pardew. He made his competitive debut as a 70th-minute substitute in a Premier League match against Aston Villa on 23 August 2014. He injured his right thigh during training in early September, ruling him out for "a number of months".

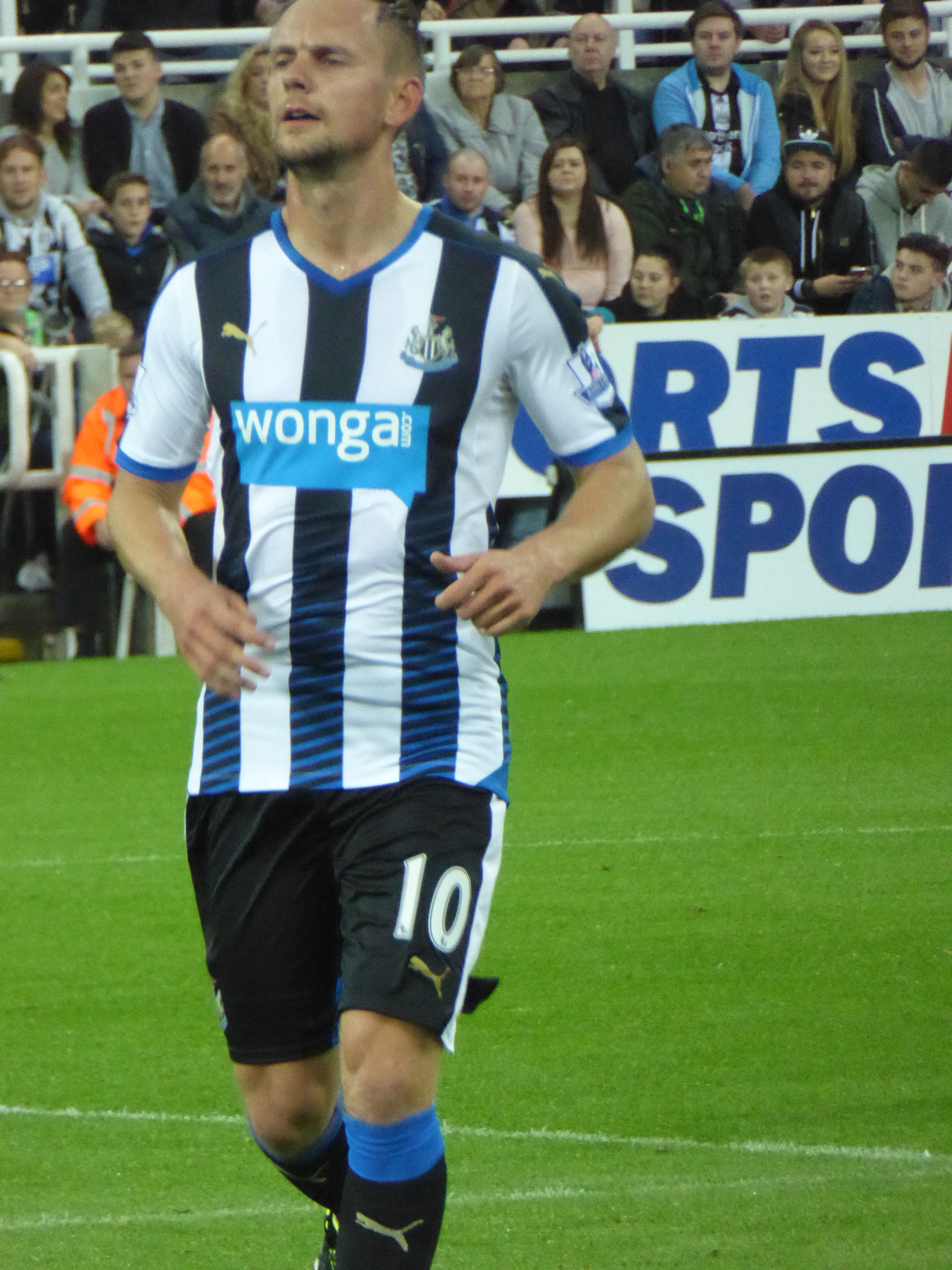
De Jong in 2015

De Jong was due to make his return to the Newcastle first team in February 2015, but he was sidelined for a further eight weeks due to a collapsed lung, a condition he had previously experienced while at Ajax. Upon his return to the team, De Jong scored his first Newcastle goal in a 3–2 loss against Swansea City on 25 April 2015. De Jong started for the club in a 4–1 victory in the League Cup at Northampton Town, scoring Newcastle's second goal, his second for the club.

In January 2016, De Jong was sidelined for two weeks in a freak accident in which one of his contact lenses was pushed into his eye, threatening his sight.

==== PSV (loan) ====
On 22 August 2016, Newcastle confirmed that De Jong had moved to PSV on a season-long loan.

On 11 December, he scored his first goal for PSV against Go Ahead Eagles four minutes after coming off the substitutes' bench in the 64th minute. The goal helped PSV close to within three points of Feyenoord and Ajax, which were joint top of the Eredivisie table.

Asked about his longer-term future, De Jong said that it would be ideal if Newcastle "are promoted first and then I return to play in the Premier League", which eventually proved successful on 25 April 2017 after beating Preston 4–1.

=== Return to Ajax ===
On 28 August 2017, it was announced that de Jong would return to Ajax, signing a three-year contract with the Amsterdam club.

==== Sydney FC (loan) ====
On 23 August 2018, de Jong joined A-League side Sydney FC on a season-long loan deal. He was part of the team that won the 2019 A-League Grand Final.

=== FC Cincinnati ===
de Jong joined MLS side FC Cincinnati on 20 February 2020. He was released by Cincinnati at the end of their 2020 season.

=== SC Heerenveen ===
On 4 December 2020, de Jong returned to the Netherlands with Eredivisie side SC Heerenveen.

=== De Graafschap ===
On 16 June 2022, de Jong signed a one-year contract with De Graafschap with an option for an additional year. The move meant a return to his boyhood club.

On 18 May 2023, he announced his intention to retire after the final match of the season the following day.

== International career ==
=== Netherlands under-19 ===
De Jong made his international debut at the under-19 level in May 2007 against Czech Republic and capped six times. He played three games there, but the Netherlands did not qualify for the UEFA U-19 Championship. In the next qualifying campaign, he was more successful, playing three games and scoring in two of them. He scored in the qualifying campaign for the 2008 UEFA European Under-19 Championship once in his debut game in 83rd minute against Georgia (2–0 win). He started the second game but did not score. In the final game, against Norway, he scored in the 15th minute of an eventual 3–1 loss.

=== Netherlands under-21 ===
On 12 November 2007, De Jong was called up to the Netherlands under-21 squad by Foppe de Haan for the game against Macedonia. Because of his injury in March, he missed the qualifying game against Estonia and was replaced by Jonathan de Guzmán. After recovering from his injury in April, De Haan recalled him but De Jong failed to make the final squad for the 2008 Olympics. De Jong played three more games for the under-21 team, but they failed to qualify for the 2009 European Championships.

De Jong was recalled for the 2011 UEFA U21 Championship qualifiers and scored the opening goal against Liechtenstein in a 3–0 win.

=== Netherlands senior team ===
On 11 August 2010, De Jong made his debut for the senior side in its 1–1 draw with Ukraine in a friendly match, playing the first 62 minutes. Having been named in the provisional squads for the UEFA Euro 2012 by manager Bert van Marwijk, De Jong missed out when the final 23-man squad was announced on 26 May 2012. He scored his first two goals for the Netherlands under Louis van Gaal in a friendly encounter against Indonesia at the Gelora Bung Karno Stadium, Jakarta on 7 June 2013. Coming on as a half-time substitute for Wesley Sneijder, De Jong scored the Dutch's first two goals, with both goals having been assisted by Ruben Schaken leading to a 3–0 win.

== Post-playing career ==
Following his retirement from professional football in May 2023, De Jong transitioned into the administrative and technical side of the sport. In January 2024, he entered a specialized traineeship program at AFC Ajax alongside former teammates Daniel de Ridder, Ricardo van Rhijn, and Kelly Zeeman. The program was designed to integrate former players into the club's organizational structure, allowing them to gain experience across various departments including marketing, facilities, and technical management.

In March 2024, it was confirmed that De Jong had taken on a more focused role within the technical heart of the club, providing support to technical director Jordi Cruijff. In this capacity, De Jong assists with scouting operations and serves as an internal technical manager, acting as a bridge between the board and the football staff. His responsibilities include providing technical analysis and supporting the management of the first-team squad and the Ajax Youth Academy.

== Personal life ==
Siem de Jong's younger brother Luuk played formerly for Newcastle in 2014. Siem linked up again with his brother at PSV in 2016.

== Career statistics ==
=== Club ===
Appearances and goals by club, season and competition
Club	Season	League			National cup (Note: Netherlands – KNVB Cup, England – FA Cup, Australia — FFA Cup)		League cup (Note: Includes League Cup)		Continental		Other		Total	
Club	Season	Division	Apps	Goals	Apps	Goals	Apps	Goals	Apps	Goals	Apps	Goals	Apps	Goals
Ajax	2007–08	Eredivisie	22	2	3	0	—		0	0	2 (Note: Appearances in Eredivisie playoffs)	0	27	2
Ajax	2008–09	Eredivisie	10	1	2	0	—		4 (Note: Appearances in UEFA Cup)	0	0	0	16	1
Ajax	2009–10	Eredivisie	22	10	5	6	—		7 (Note: Appearances in UEFA Europa League)	1	0	0	33	17
Ajax	2010–11	Eredivisie	32	12	6	3	—		13 (Note: Nine appearances, one goal in UEFA Champions League, four appearances in Europa League)	1	1 (Note: Appearance in Johan Cruyff Shield)	0	52	16
Ajax	2011–12	Eredivisie	29	13	3	3	—		6 (Note: Four appearances, one goal in Champions League, two appearances in Europa League)	1	1	0	39	17
Ajax	2012–13	Eredivisie	34	12 (Note: Worldfootball.net mistakenly attributes Eriksen's goal against Feyenoord on 20 January 2013 to de Jong.)	4	1	—		8 (Note: Six appearances, three goals in Champions League, two appearances in Europa League)	3	1	0	47	16
Ajax	2013–14	Eredivisie	19	7	2	1	—		6 (Note: Four appearances in Champions League, two in Europa League)	0	1	1	28	9
Ajax	Total		168	57	25	14	0	0	44	6	6	1	243	78
Newcastle United	2014–15	Premier League	4	1	0	0	1	0	—		—		5	1
Newcastle United	2015–16	Premier League	18	0	1	0	2	1	—		—		21	1
Newcastle United	2016–17	Championship	0	0	0	0	0	0	—		—		0	0
Newcastle United	Total		22	1	1	0	3	1	0	0	0	0	26	2
Jong PSV (loan)	2016–17	Eerste Divisie	2	1	0	0	—		—		—		2	1
PSV Eindhoven (loan)	2016–17	Eredivisie	19	6	1	0	—		3 (Note: Appearances in Champions League)	0	—		23	6
Jong Ajax	2017–18	Eerste Divisie	1	1	0	0	—		—		—		1	1
Ajax	2017–18	Eredivisie	21	4	3	3	—		0	0	0	0	24	7
Ajax	2019–20	Eredivisie	4	0	1	3	—		4	0	0	0	9	3
Ajax	Total		25	4	4	6	0	0	4	0	0	0	33	10
Sydney FC (loan)	2018–19	A-League	17	4	2	1	—		2 (Note: Appearances in AFC Champions League)	1	—		21	6
FC Cincinnati	2020	Major League Soccer	15	0	—		—		—		1 (Note: Appearance in MLS is Back Tournament Round of 16)	0	16	0
Heerenveen	2020–21	Eredivisie	19	4	3	1	—		—		—		22	5
Heerenveen	2021–22	Eredivisie	27	0	3	1	—		—		—		30	1
Heerenveen	Total		46	4	6	2	0	0	0	0	0	0	52	6
De Graafschap	2022–23	Eerste Divisie	26	5	2	1	—		—		—		28	6
Career total			341	83	41	24	3	1	53	7	7	1	445	116

=== International ===
Appearances and goals by national team and year
National team	Year	Apps	Goals
Netherlands	2010	1	0
Netherlands	2011	0	0
Netherlands	2012	0	0
Netherlands	2013	5	2
Total		6	2

Scores and results list Netherlands goal tally first, score column indicates score after each de Jong goal.

List of international goals scored by Siem de Jong
No.	Date	Venue	Opponent	Score	Result	Competition
1	7 June 2013	Gelora Bung Karno Stadium, Jakarta, Indonesia	Indonesia	1–0	3–0	Friendly
2	7 June 2013	Gelora Bung Karno Stadium, Jakarta, Indonesia	Indonesia	2–0	3–0	Friendly

== Honours ==
Ajax

- Eredivisie: 2010–11, 2011–12, 2012–13, 2013–14
- KNVB Cup: 2009–10
- Johan Cruyff Shield: 2013

Sydney FC

- A-League: 2018–19

Individual

- AFC Ajax Talent of the Future: 2007
- Dutch Eredivisie Fair Play Award: 2013
