= Timothy van der Meulen =

Dutch footballer (born 1990)

Personal information
- Date of birth: 2 March 1990 (age 36)
- Place of birth: Amsterdam, Netherlands
- Height: 1.88 m (6 ft 2 in)
- Position: Centre back

Youth career
- 1997–1998: CTO'70
- 1998–2003: Almere
- 2003–2006: Omniworld
- 2006–2009: Ajax

Senior career*
Years	Team	Apps	(Gls)
2009–2010	Ajax	0	(0)
2010	→ Haarlem (loan)	1	(0)
2011	Dundee United	7	(0)
2011–2012	Bayern Munich II	31	(8)
2012–2014	De Graafschap	34	(2)
2015–2016	Almere City	0	(0)
2017	FC Homburg	1	(0)
2017–2018	FC Lisse	2	(0)

International career
2006–2007	Netherlands U17	9	(1)
- * Club domestic league appearances and goals

Timothy van der Meulen (born 2 March 1990) is a Dutch former professional footballer who played as a centre back. He previously played on loan from Ajax for HFC Haarlem in the Eerste Divisie and joined Dundee United on a short-term deal in January 2011. He represented the Netherlands U17 national team at the 2007 UEFA European Under-17 Championship.

== Club career ==
Van der Meulen was born in Amsterdam. In early 2010, he was sent out on loan to Eerste Divisie side HFC Haarlem to gain more experience. He made his debut on 22 January 2010 in a 3–0 away loss to SBV Excelsior. It would turn out to be his only match for Haarlem because the club soon afterward went into bankruptcy, meaning he had to return to Ajax for the remainder of the 2009–10 season. He joined Scottish Premier League club Dundee United on a short-term deal after a successful trial. He joined Bayern Munich II in July 2011 and ended his first season as joint top scorer (with Saër Sène), scoring eight goals.

In 2012, he moved on a free transfer to De Graafschap. On 1 February 2014, his contract got dissolved.

In 2017, Van der Meulen joined FC Homburg. He only made one appearance for the club, before leaving at the end of the season.

After joining FC Lisse ahead of the 2017–18 season, Van der Meulen made just three appearances across all competitions before leaving the club at the end of the season.

== International career ==
Van der Meulen represented the Netherlands U-17 team at the 2007 UEFA European Under-17 Championship. Van der Meulen was in the starting line-up for all three group games against Belgium, Iceland, and England, but the team failed to qualify for the second round.

== Career statistics ==
As of 2 February 2014

Appearances and goals by club, season and competition
Club	Season	League			National cup (Note: Includes KNVB Cup, Scottish Cup, DFB-Pokal.)		League cup (Note: Includes Scottish League Cup.)		Continental		Total	
Club	Season	Division	Apps	Goals	Apps	Goals	Apps	Goals	Apps	Goals	Apps	Goals
HFC Haarlem (loan)	2009–10	Eerste Divisie	1	0							1	0
Dundee United	2010–11	Scottish Premier League	7	0	0	0	0	0			7	0
Bayern Munich II	2011–12	Regionalliga Süd	31	8							31	8
De Graafschap	2012–13	Eerste Divisie	23	1	1	0	4	1			28	2
De Graafschap	2013–14	Eerste Divisie	7	0	0	0					7	0
Career total			69	9	0	0	0	0	0	0	74	10
