= RKSV DCG =

Dutch football club

Coordinates: 52°22′11″N 4°48′1″E

DCG
- Full name: Rooms Katholieke Sport Vereniging Door Combinatie Groot
- Nickname: De Boekaniers
- Founded: 6 November 1920; 104 years ago
- Ground: Sportpark Ookmeer, Amsterdam, Netherlands
- League: Vierde Klasse Saturday (2012–13); Derde Klasse Sunday (2012–13)
- Website: http://www.rksv-dcg.nl/
Home colours

Rooms Katholieke Sport Vereniging Door Combinatie Groot (RKSV DCG) is a Dutch association football club from Amsterdam.

== History ==
DCG was established through the 11 September 1945 merger of DOSS (founded 6 November 1920), Constantius (27 February 1921 in the St. Johannes Bergmans patronaat) and Gezellen Vier (founded 9 April 1929 in de parochie van De Liefde, Da Costakade). This DCG was rebranded to Door Combinatie Groot. In 1968 the club achieved its biggest success when their Sunday amateur team won the national amateur championship of the Netherlands.

== Honours ==
- Overall Sunday championship
  - Champions: 1968
- District Cup West I
  - Winners: 1992
