= Ronald Graafland =

Dutch footballer

Personal information
- Full name: Ronald Graafland
- Date of birth: April 30, 1979 (age 47)
- Place of birth: Rotterdam, Netherlands
- Height: 1.90 m (6 ft 3 in)
- Position: Goalkeeper

Senior career*
Years	Team	Apps	(Gls)
1998–2000	Feyenoord	0	(0)
2000–2008	Excelsior	86	(0)
2008–2010	Vitesse	0	(0)
2010–2011	Ajax	0	(0)
2011–2015	Feyenoord	1	(0)
Total		87	(0)

International career
1996–1997	Netherlands U18	2	(0)
1997	Netherlands U19	2	(0)
2000	Netherlands U21	2	(0)
- * Club domestic league appearances and goals as of 24 May 2015 (UTC)

Ronald Graafland (Dutch pronunciation: [ˈroːnɑlt ˈxraːflɑnt]; (Note: In isolation, Graafland is pronounced [ˈɣraːflɑnt].) born 30 April 1979 in Rotterdam) is a Dutch retired footballer who played for hometown club DCV, Feyenoord, Excelsior, Vitesse and Ajax.

He was appointed goalkeeper coach at Excelsior in 2016.

== International career ==
Graafland was capped twice by the Netherlands national under-21 football team and also played 2 games for the U19s.

== Personal life ==
Graafland grew up in Krimpen aan den IJssel, where his parents ran a snackbar and Graafland also worked twice a week before joining Ajax. A documentary about his career highlighted the brain contusion he sustained in a game against FC Dordrecht when teammate Raphaël Supusepa accidentally kicked his head.

== Honours ==
=== Club ===
Feyenoord

- Eredivisie (1): 1998–99
