= Soccer (1991 video game) =

1991 video game

Soccer Football International
- Japanese cover art
- Developer(s): Tose
- Publisher(s): JP: Tonkin House; EU: Bandai
- Platform(s): Game Boy
- Release: JP: June 7, 1991; EU: 1991
- Genre(s): Traditional soccer simulation
- Mode(s): Single-player; Multiplayer

Soccer (サッカー) (known in Europe as Football International) is a football video game with top-down perspective, developed by Tose for the Game Boy handheld, which was released in 1991.

== Gameplay ==
Screenshot showing the Soccer top-down perspective and team selection.

The game consists of exhibition games (test match) and tournament games (world cup). In World Cup mode, one plays until one beats all other seven teams.

Eight national teams are represented in the game:

- Brazil
- England (the United Kingdom flag is incorrectly displayed)
- France
- Germany
- Italy
- Japan
- Spain
- United States

== See also ==
- Sports Collection
