= 2008–09 AFC Ajax season =

Dutch football club season

Ajax
2008–09 season
- Chairman: Uri Coronel
- Manager: Marco van Basten (until 6 May 2009); John van 't Schip (interim)
- Eredivisie: 3rd
- KNVB Cup: Third Round
- UEFA Cup: Round of 16
- Top goalscorer: League: Luis Suárez (22 goals); All: Luis Suárez (28 goals)
Home colours	Away colours

During the 2008–09 season AFC Ajax participated in the Eredivisie, the KNVB Cup and the UEFA Cup. The first training took place on Monday July 14, 2008. The traditional AFC Ajax Open Day was on Tuesday August 5, 2008, followed by a testimonial match for the retired former Ajax defender Jaap Stam.

== Pre-season ==
The first training for the 2008–09 season was held on July 14, 2008. In preparation for the new season Ajax organized a training camp in De Lutte, Netherlands at the De Thij Sportpark. During the pre-season, the squad from manager Marco van Basten played friendly matches against VV Noordwijk, CVV Germanicus and Excelsior '31 before traveling to the United Kingdom to play against Cardiff City and Sunderland, then traveling to Spain to play Real Murcia. They then returned to Amsterdam to play Arsenal and Internazionale in the annual Amsterdam Tournament.

== Player statistics ==
Appearances for competitive matches only

No.	Pos	Nat	Player	Total		Eredivisie		UEFA Cup		KNVB Cup	
No.	Pos	Nat	Player	Apps	Goals	Apps	Goals	Apps	Goals	Apps	Goals
1	GK	(Netherlands) NED	Maarten Stekelenburg	15	0	12	0	2	0	1	0
2	DF	(Uruguay) URU	Bruno Silva	13	0	5+3	0	3+1	0	1	0
3	DF	(Spain) ESP	Oleguer	37	1	26+1	1	9	0	1	0
4	DF	(Belgium) BEL	Thomas Vermaelen	41	5	31	4	8	1	2	0
5	DF	(Belgium) BEL	Jan Vertonghen	35	5	23+3	4	7	1	2	0
6	MF	(Sweden) SWE	Rasmus Lindgren	32	2	15+7	2	6+2	0	1+1	0
7	DF	(Sweden) SWE	Kennedy Bakircioglü	12	2	5+3	1	2+1	1	1	0
8	DF	(Netherlands) NED	Urby Emanuelson	42	4	31+1	4	9	0	1	0
10	FW	(Serbia) SRB	Miralem Sulejmani	34	10	23+4	8	7	2	0	0
11	FW	(Morocco) MAR	Ismaïl Aissati	11	1	8+1	1	2	0	0	0
12	GK	(Netherlands) NED	Kenneth Vermeer	31	0	22	0	8	0	1	0
15	DF	(Netherlands) NED	Gregory van der Wiel	43	2	31+1	2	8+1	0	2	0
16	FW	(Uruguay) URU	Luis Suárez	43	28	30+1	22	10	5	2	1
17	DF	(Netherlands) NED	Rob Wielaert	16	1	16	1	0	0	0	0
18	MF	(Spain) ESP	Gabri	21	1	12+4	1	3+1	0	1	0
20	FW	(Argentina) ARG	Darío Cvitanich	23	9	14+4	9	2+2	0	0+1	0
21	MF	(Cameroon) CMR	Eyong Enoh	25	2	17+2	1	5	1	1	0
22	MF	(Netherlands) NED	Siem de Jong	16	1	5+5	1	2+2	0	1+1	0
23	FW	(Brazil) BRA	Leonardo	33	4	5+19	2	0+8	2	0+1	0
24	MF	(Netherlands) NED	Jan-Arie van der Heijden	0	0	0	0	0	0	0	0
25	MF	(Netherlands) NED	Evander Sno	15	1	4+6	1	2+2	0	1	0
26	MF	(Netherlands) NED	Jeffrey Sarpong	14	1	6+4	1	2+1	0	1	0
28	MF	(Netherlands Antilles) ANT	Vurnon Anita	21	1	12+4	0	3+2	1	0	0
29	MF	(Netherlands) NED	Mitchell Donald	0	0	0	0	0	0	0	0
30	GK	(Netherlands) NED	Dennis Gentenaar	0	0	0	0	0	0	0	0
31	FW	(Croatia) CRO	Darko Bodul	1	0	0+1	0	0	0	0	0
33	FW	(Netherlands Antilles) ANT	Javier Martina	2	0	1+1	0	0	0	0	0
37	DF	(Netherlands) NED	Robbert Schilder	18	0	7+4	0	3+2	0	0+2	0
38	DF	(Belgium) BEL	Toby Alderweireld	8	0	2+3	0	2+1	0	0	0
39	MF	(Netherlands) NED	Daley Blind	6	0	0+5	0	0+1	0	0	0
43	FW	(Netherlands) NED	Marvin Zeegelaar	1	0	0	0	0	0	1	0
Players sold or loaned out after the start of the season:
9	FW	(Netherlands) NED	Klaas-Jan Huntelaar	15	9	10	6	4	2	1	1
11	FW	(Denmark) DEN	Kenneth Perez	0	0	0	0	0	0	0	0
19	FW	(Denmark) DEN	Dennis Rommedahl	3	0	1+2	0	0	0	0	0
27	MF	(Belgium) BEL	Laurent Delorge	0	0	0	0	0	0	0	0
34	FW	(Netherlands) NED	John Goossens	0	0	0	0	0	0	0	0
36	GK	(South Africa) RSA	Hans Vonk	0	0	0	0	0	0	0	0

As of 31 October 2011

=== 2008-09 selection by nationality ===
Nationality	(Netherlands)	(Belgium)	(Spain)	(Sweden)	(Uruguay)	(Netherlands Antilles)	(Argentina)	(Brazil)	(Cameroon)	(Croatia)	(Morocco)	(Serbia)	(Denmark)	(Romania)	Total Players
Current squad selection	11	2	2	2	2	1	1	1	1	1	1	1	-	-	27
Youth/reserves squad in AFC Ajax selection	3	1	-	-	-	1	-	-	-	-	-	-	-	-	5
Players out on loan	1	-	1	-	-	-	-	-	-	-	-	-	1	1	4

== Team statistics ==
=== Eredivisie standings 2008-09 ===
Standing	Matches played	Wins	Draws	Losses	Points	Goals for	Goals against	Yellow cards (yellow card)	Red cards (red card)
3	34	21	5	8	68	74	41	60	6

==== Points by match day ====
Match day	1	2	3	4	5	6	7	8	9	10	11	12	13	14	15	16	17	18	19	20	21	22	23	24	25	26	27	28	29	30	31	32	33	34	Total
Points	0	3	1	3	0	3	3	3	3	3	3	0	1	3	3	3	3	3	0	0	1	0	3	3	3	1	3	3	3	3	0	1	0	3	68

==== Total points by match day ====
Match day	1	2	3	4	5	6	7	8	9	10	11	12	13	14	15	16	17	18	19	20	21	22	23	24	25	26	27	28	29	30	31	32	33	34	Total
Points	0	3	4	7	7	10	13	16	19	22	25	25	26	29	32	35	38	41	41	41	42	42	45	48	51	52	55	58	61	64	64	65	65	68	68

==== Standing by match day ====
Match day	1	2	3	4	5	6	7	8	9	10	11	12	13	14	15	16	17	18	19	20	21	22	23	24	25	26	27	28	29	30	31	32	33	34	Standing
Standing	12th	9th	12th	6th	10th	9th	5th	5th	2nd	2nd	1st	3rd	2nd	2nd	2nd	2nd	2nd	2nd	2nd	2nd	3rd	3rd	3rd	3rd	3rd	3rd	3rd	3rd	3rd	3rd	3rd	3rd	3rd	3rd	3rd

==== Goals by match day ====
Match day	1	2	3	4	5	6	7	8	9	10	11	12	13	14	15	16	17	18	19	20	21	22	23	24	25	26	27	28	29	30	31	32	33	34	Total
Goals	1	1	2	3	2	1	2	3	2	5	4	0	1	2	3	6	3	4	0	0	2	1	2	2	2	1	3	3	2	7	2	1	0	1	74

=== Statistics for the 2008-09 season ===
- This is an overview of all the statistics for played matches in the 2008-09 season.

	Friendlies	Amsterdam Tournament	KNVB Cup	UEFA Cup	Eredivisie	Total
Matches	7	2	2	10	34	55
Wins	4	0	1	5	21	31
Draws	1	0	0	3	5	9
Losses	2	2	1	2	8	14
Home	0	2	1	5	17	25
Away	7	0	1	5	17	30
Yellow cards (yellow card)	2	2	2	17	60	83
Red cards (red card)	0	0	0	2	6	8
2 x yellow in 1 match (yellow card) (yellow-red card)	0	0	0	1	3	4
Number of substitutes used (substituted on) (substituted off)	47	8	6	27	89	177
Goals for	24	2	2	16	74	118
Goals against	8	4	1	10	41	64
Balance	+16	-2	+1	+6	+33	+54
Clean sheets	3	0	1	4	14	22
Penalties for	2	0	0	2	8	12
Penalties against	0	0	0	0	3	3

=== 2008-09 team records ===
Description	Competition	Result
Biggest win	(Netherlands) Friendly match	Excelsior '31 - AFC Ajax ( 1 - 8 )
Biggest win	(Netherlands) KNVB Cup	AFC Ajax - FC Utrecht ( 2 - 0 )
Biggest win	(European Union) UEFA Cup	FK Borac Čačak - AFC Ajax ( 1 - 4 )
Biggest win	(Netherlands) Eredivisie	AFC Ajax - Willem II ( 7 - 0 )
Biggest loss	(Portugal) Friendly match	VfB Stuttgart - AFC Ajax ( 3 - 2 )
Biggest loss	(Netherlands) KNVB Cup	FC Volendam - AFC Ajax ( 1 - 0 )
Biggest loss	(European Union) UEFA Cup	Olympique de Marseille - AFC Ajax ( 2 - 1 )
Biggest loss	(Netherlands) Eredivisie	PSV - AFC Ajax ( 6 - 2 )
Most goals in a match	(Netherlands) Friendly match	Excelsior '31 - AFC Ajax ( 1 - 8 )
Most goals in a match	(Netherlands) KNVB Cup	AFC Ajax - FC Utrecht ( 2 - 0 )
Most goals in a match	(European Union) UEFA Cup	FK Borac Čačak - AFC Ajax ( 1 - 4 )
Most goals in a match	(Netherlands) Eredivisie	PSV - AFC Ajax ( 6 - 2 )

==== Top scorers ====
Friendlies

Nr.	Name	Goal
1.	(Uruguay) Luis Suárez	5
2.	(Argentina) Darío Cvitanich	4
3.	(Spain) Gabri	3
4.	(Brazil) Leonardo	2
4.	(Denmark) Kenneth Perez	2
6.	(Netherlands) Jeffrey Sarpong	1
6.	(Spain) Albert Luque	1
6.	(Netherlands) Jan-Arie van der Heijden	1
6.	(Sweden) Kennedy Bakircioglü	1
6.	(Netherlands Antilles) Javier Martina	1
6.	(Netherlands) Siem de Jong	1
6.	(Netherlands Antilles) Vurnon Anita	1
6.	(Netherlands) Klaas-Jan Huntelaar	1
Total		24

Eredivisie

Nr.	Name	Goal
1.	(Uruguay) Luis Suárez	22
2.	(Argentina) Darío Cvitanich	9
3.	(Serbia) Miralem Sulejmani	8
4.	(Netherlands) Klaas-Jan Huntelaar	6
5.	(Belgium) Thomas Vermaelen	4
5.	(Belgium) Jan Vertonghen	4
5.	(Netherlands) Urby Emanuelson	4
8.	(Brazil) Leonardo	2
8.	(Sweden) Rasmus Lindgren	2
8.	(Netherlands) Gregory van der Wiel	2
11.	(Netherlands) Jeffrey Sarpong	1
11.	(Spain) Oleguer	1
11.	(Netherlands) Siem de Jong	1
11.	(Netherlands) Evander Sno	1
11.	(Sweden) Kennedy Bakircioglü	1
11.	(Spain) Gabri	1
11.	(Netherlands) Rob Wielaert	1
11.	(Morocco) Ismaïl Aissati	1
11.	(Cameroon) Eyong Enoh	1
Own goals	(Netherlands) Erik Pieters (PSV)	1
Own goals	(Spain) Fernández (N.E.C.)	1
Total		74

KNVB Cup

Nr.	Name	Goal
1.	(Uruguay) Luis Suárez	1
1.	(Netherlands) Klaas-Jan Huntelaar	1
Total		2

UEFA Cup

Nr.	Name	Goal
1.	(Uruguay) Luis Suárez	5
2.	(Netherlands) Klaas-Jan Huntelaar	2
2.	(Serbia) Miralem Sulejmani	2
2.	(Brazil) Leonardo	2
5.	(Netherlands) Jeffrey Sarpong	1
5.	(Belgium) Thomas Vermaelen	1
5.	(Belgium) Jan Vertonghen	1
5.	(Sweden) Kennedy Bakircioglü	1
5.	(Cameroon) Eyong Enoh	1
Total		16

Amsterdam Tournament

Nr.	Name	Goal
1.	(Uruguay) Luis Suárez	1
1.	(Netherlands) Klaas-Jan Huntelaar	1
Total		2

== Placements ==
	Friendlies	Amsterdam Tournament	KNVB Cup	UEFA Cup	Eredivisie
Status	7 played, 4 wins, 1 draw, 2 losses	4th place	Eliminated in Third Round; Last opponent: FC Volendam	Eliminated in Round of 16; Last opponent: Olympique de Marseille	3rd place 68 points in 34 matches qualified for UEFA Europa League Qualifying rounds

- Luis Suárez is voted Player of the year by the supporters of AFC Ajax.
- Gregory van der Wiel is voted Talent of the year by the supporters of AFC Ajax.

== Results ==
All times are in CEST

=== Eredivisie ===
30 August 2008 1	Willem II	2 − 1	Ajax	Tilburg
18:45	Demouge 47'; Akgün 65'	Report	Sulejmani 23'; Sno (red card) 83'	Stadium: Willem II Stadion; Attendance: 14,000; Referee: Pieter Vink

14 September 2008 2	Ajax	1 − 0	Roda JC	Amsterdam
14:30	Vermaelen 54'	Report		Stadium: Amsterdam Arena; Attendance: 47,468; Referee: Roelof Luinge

21 September 2008 3	Feyenoord	2 − 2	Ajax	Rotterdam
12:30	Tomasson 50', 85' (pen.)	Report	Sarpong 38'; Huntelaar 69'	Stadium: Feyenoord Stadion; Attendance: 42,000; Referee: Eric Braamhaar

28 September 2008 4	Ajax	3 − 0	Vitesse	Amsterdam
14:30	Suárez 61'; Vertonghen 76', 82'	Report		Stadium: Amsterdam Arena; Attendance: 47,000; Referee: Reinold Wiedemeier

5 October 2008 5	SC Heerenveen	5 − 2	Ajax	Heerenveen
16:30	Silva 4' (o.g.); Beerens 8'; Sibon 51'; Pranjić 63', 90' (pen.)	Report	Huntelaar 79'; Suárez 81' (pen.); Van der Wiel (yellow card) 19' (yellow-red card) 89'	Stadium: Abe Lenstra Stadion; Attendance: 25,000; Referee: Pieter Vink

18 October 2008 6	Ajax	1 − 0	FC Groningen	Amsterdam
20:45	Oleguer 37'	Report		Stadium: Amsterdam Arena; Attendance: 45,531; Referee: Bas Nijhuis

26 October 2008 7	Ajax	2 − 0	N.E.C.	Amsterdam
14:30	Huntelaar 44'; Suárez 73'	Report		Stadium: Amsterdam Arena; Attendance: 46,000; Referee: Ruud Bossen

29 October 2008 8	Heracles Almelo	1 − 3	Ajax	Almelo
20:00	Wuytens 29'; Van den Bergh (red card)	Report	Suárez 2'; Huntelaar 77', 82'	Stadium: Polman Stadion; Attendance: 8,500; Referee: Richard Liesveld

1 November 2008 9	FC Twente	0 − 2	Ajax	Enschede
18:45		Report	De Jong 40'; Lindgren 91'	Stadium: De Grolsch Veste; Attendance: 24,000; Referee: Roelof Luinge

9 November 2008 10	Ajax	5 − 2	Sparta Rotterdam	Amsterdam
14:30	Huntelaar 16'; Suárez 21'; Sno 42'; Bakircioglü 74'; Leonardo 85'	Report	John 57'; Rose 89'	Stadium: Amsterdam Arena; Attendance: 48,000; Referee: Pol van Boekel

16 November 2008 11	Ajax	4 − 1	PSV	Amsterdam
12:30	Suárez 27'; Sulejmani 74'; Pieters 78' (o.g.); Leonardo 90+1'	Report	Afellay 56'	Stadium: Amsterdam Arena; Attendance: 49,665; Referee: Kevin Blom

23 November 2008 12	AZ	2 − 0	Ajax	Alkmaar
12:30	De Zeeuw 22' (pen.); Ari 51'	Report		Stadium: DSB Stadion; Attendance: 16,000; Referee: Roelof Luinge

30 November 2008 13	Ajax	1 − 1	FC Utrecht	Amsterdam
12:30	Sulejmani 62'	Report	Keller 34'	Stadium: Amsterdam Arena; Attendance: 45,929; Referee: Tom van Sichem

7 December 2008 14	FC Volendam	1 − 2	Ajax	Volendam
14:30	Sheotahul 41'	Report	Suárez 44'; Vertonghen 64'	Stadium: Kras Stadion; Attendance: 6,260; Referee: Dick van Egmond

12 December 2008 15	Ajax	3 − 0	NAC Breda	Amsterdam
20:45	Cvitanich 27'; Suárez 55' (pen.); Lindgren 64'	Report	Kwakman (yellow card) 50' (yellow-red card) 54'	Stadium: Amsterdam Arena; Attendance: 50,541; Referee: Bas Nijhuis

21 December 2008 16	De Graafschap	0 − 6	Ajax	Doetinchem
12:30	Volmer (red card) 35'	Report	Cvitanich 10', 71'; Sulejmani 12'; Suárez 53' (pen.), 62'; Emanuelson 67'	Stadium: De Vijverberg; Attendance: 12,000; Referee: Jan Wegereef

28 December 2008 17	Ajax	3 − 0	ADO Den Haag	Amsterdam
12:30	Cvitanich 7', 18', 57'	Report		Stadium: Amsterdam Arena; Attendance: 47,125; Referee: Eric Braamhaar

18 January 2009 18	N.E.C.	2 − 4	Ajax	Nijmegen
14:30	Zomer 50'; El-Akchaoui 67'	Report	Sulejmani 48', 54'; Cvitanich (yellow card) 3' (yellow-red card) 70'; Fernández 79' (o.g.); Gabri 95'	Stadium: Stadion de Goffert; Attendance: 12,000; Referee: Kevin Blom

25 January 2009 19	FC Groningen	1 − 0	Ajax	Groningen
14:30	Holla 39'	Report	Vertonghen (yellow card) 54' (yellow-red card) 86'	Stadium: Euroborg; Attendance: 22,230; Referee: Jan Wegereef

31 January 2009 20	Ajax	0 − 1	SC Heerenveen	Amsterdam
20:45	Vermaelen (red card) 47'	Report	Pranjić 58'	Stadium: Amsterdam Arena; Attendance: 50,333; Referee: Roelof Luinge

3 February 2009 21	Ajax	2 − 2	Heracles Almelo	Amsterdam
20:15	Sulejmani 70'; Suárez 72' (pen.)	Report	Van de Bergh 12'; Schulmeister 31'	Stadium: Amsterdam Arena; Attendance: 46,355; Referee: Pol van Boekel

8 February 2009 22	Vitesse	4 − 1	Ajax	Arnhem
12:30	Nilsson 7', 44'; Stevanovič 40'; Van Wolfswinkel 68'	Report	Suárez 15'	Stadium: GelreDome; Attendance: 21,775; Referee: Reinold Wiedemeijer

15 February 2009 23	Ajax	2 − 0	Feyenoord	Amsterdam
12:30	Vermaelen 51'; Emanuelson 90+1'	Report	Tiendalli (yellow card) 73' (yellow-red card) 82'	Stadium: Amsterdam Arena; Attendance: 50,136; Referee: Pieter Vink

22 February 2009 24	Ajax	2 − 1	FC Volendam	Amsterdam
16:30	Suárez 29'; Vermaelen 75'	Report	Sheotahul 14'	Stadium: Amsterdam Arena; Attendance: 49,749; Referee: Raymond van Meenen

1 March 2009 25	FC Utrecht	0 − 2	Ajax	Utrecht
12:30		Report	Van der Wiel 8'; Vertonghen 62'	Stadium: Stadion Galgenwaard; Attendance: 23,000; Referee: Roelof Luinge

8 March 2009 26	ADO Den Haag	1 − 1	Ajax	The Hague
12:30	Verhoek 63'	Report	Wielaert 60'	Stadium: ADO Den Haag Stadion; Attendance: 12,000; Referee: Björn Kuipers

15 March 2009 27	Ajax	3 − 0	De Graafschap	Amsterdam
14:30	Suárez 23', 69' (pen.); Cvitanich 41'	Report		Stadium: Amsterdam Arena; Attendance: 49,587; Referee: Ben Haverkor

22 March 2009 28	NAC Breda	0 − 3	Ajax	Breda
14:30		Report	Vermaelen 35'; Van der Wiel 64'; Suárez 86'	Stadium: Rat Verlegh Stadion; Attendance: 17,254; Referee: Pieter Vink

5 April 2009 29	Roda JC	1 − 2	Ajax	Kerkrade
12:30	Cissé 71'	Report	Suárez 2'; Aissati 66'	Stadium: Parkstad Limburg Stadion; Attendance: 17,970; Referee: Johan Verbist

12 April 2009 30	Ajax	7 − 0	Willem II	Amsterdam
16:30	Cvitanich 2', 20'; Enoh 10'; Suárez 35' (pen.), 69', 82' (pen.); Emanuelson 45'	Report	Martha (red card) 81'	Stadium: Amsterdam Arena; Attendance: 51,038; Referee: Reinold Wiedemeijer

19 April 2009 31	PSV	6 − 2	Ajax	Eindhoven
16:30	Méndez 22'; Afellay 31'; Amrabat 40'; Culina 56'; Dzsudzsák 65'; Bakkal 90'	Report	Suárez 44'; Sulejmani 76'	Stadium: Philips Stadion; Attendance: 35,000; Referee: Jan Wegereef

26 April 2009 32	Ajax	1 − 1	AZ	Amsterdam
14:30	Suárez 87' (pen.)	Report	Lens 23'; Schaars (red card) 57'	Stadium: Amsterdam Arena; Attendance: 51,128; Referee: Pieter Vink

3 May 2009 33	Sparta Rotterdam	4 − 0	Ajax	Rotterdam
14:30	Duplan 40'; Rose 45'; John 77'; Adeleye 90'	Report	Oleguer (red card) 76'	Stadium: Sparta-Stadion Het Kasteel; Attendance: 10,894; Referee: Jan Wegereef

10 May 2009 34	Ajax	1 − 0	FC Twente	Amsterdam
14:30	Emanuelson 59'	Report		Stadium: Amsterdam Arena; Attendance: 50,518; Referee: Ruud Bossen

=== KNVB Cup ===
25 October 2008 Second Round	Ajax	2 − 0	FC Utrecht	Amsterdam
20:45	Suárez 70'; Huntelaar 87'	Report	Neşu (yellow card) 27' (yellow-red card) 68'	Stadium: Amsterdam Arena; Attendance: 23,368; Referee: Jan Wegereef

12 November 2008 Third Round	FC Volendam	1 −0 (a.e.t.)	Ajax	Volendam
18:30	Tuijp 111'	Report		Stadium: Kras Stadion; Attendance: 5,224; Referee: Jack van Hulten

=== UEFA Cup ===
==== First round ====
18 September 2008 First leg	Borac Čačak (Serbia)	1 – 4	(Netherlands) Ajax	Belgrade, Serbia
21:00	Milovanović 50'	Report	Sulejmani 13'; Suárez 36'; Huntelaar 71', 86'	Stadium: Stadion FK Crvena Zvezda; Attendance: 5,000; Referee: Stanislav Sukhina (Russia)

2 October 2008 Second leg	Ajax (Netherlands)	2 – 0 (6 – 1 agg.)	(Serbia) Borac Čačak	Amsterdam, Netherlands
20:30	Sarpong 71'; Suárez 90+5'	Report		Stadium: Amsterdam Arena; Attendance: 18,139; Referee: Bernhard Brugger (Austria)

==== Group stage ====
Pos	Team	Pld	W	D	L	GF	GA	GD	Pts	Qualification	HSV	AJA	AST	ZIL	SLA
1	(Germany) Hamburger SV	4	3	0	1	7	3	+4	9	Advance to knockout stage	—	0–1	3–1	—	—
2	(Netherlands) Ajax	4	2	1	1	5	4	+1	7	Advance to knockout stage	—	—	—	1–0	2–2
3	(England) Aston Villa	4	2	0	2	5	6	−1	6	Advance to knockout stage	—	2–1	—	1–2	—
4	(Slovakia) Žilina	4	1	1	2	3	4	−1	4		1–2	—	—	—	0–0
5	(Czech Republic) Slavia Prague	4	0	2	2	2	5	−3	2		0–2	—	0–1	—	—

Source: RSSSF

23 October 2008 1	Aston Villa (England)	2 – 1	(Netherlands) Ajax	Birmingham, England
21:15	Laursen 8'; Barry 45'	Report	Vermaelen 22'	Stadium: Villa Park; Attendance: 32,000; Referee: Thomas Einwaller (Austria)

6 November 2008 2	Ajax (Netherlands)	1 – 0	(Slovakia) Žilina	Amsterdam, Netherlands
20:45	Suárez 42'	Report		Stadium: Amsterdam Arena; Attendance: 24,200; Referee: Douglas McDonald (Scotland)

27 November 2008 3	Hamburg (Germany)	0 – 1	(Netherlands) Ajax	Hamburg, Germany
20:45		Report	Leonardo 78'	Stadium: HSH Nordbank Arena; Attendance: 45,000; Referee: Paolo Tagliavento (Italy)

17 December 2008 4	Ajax (Netherlands)	2 – 2	(Czech Republic) Slavia Praha	Amsterdam, Netherlands
20:45	Vertonghen 3'; Suárez 90+1' (pen.)	Report	Černý 13'; Jarolim 41'	Stadium: Amsterdam Arena; Attendance: 30,000; Referee: Sten Kaldma (Estonia)

==== Final phase ====
===== Round of 32 =====
19 February 2009 First leg	Fiorentina (Italy)	0 – 1	(Netherlands) Ajax	Florence, Italy
20:45		Report	Bakircioglü 60'	Stadium: Stadio Artemio Franchi; Attendance: 19,018; Referee: César Muñiz Fernández (Spain)

26 February 2009 Second leg	Ajax (Netherlands)	1 – 1 (2 – 1 agg.)	(Italy) Fiorentina	Amsterdam
20:45	Leonardo 88'	Report	Gilardino 61'	Stadium: Amsterdam Arena; Attendance: 20,000; Referee: Stefan Johannesson (Sweden)

===== Round of 16 =====
12 March 2009 First leg	Marseille (France)	2 – 1	(Netherlands) Ajax	Marseille, France
20:45	Cheyrou 18'; Niang 32'	Report	Suárez 35' (pen.); Van der Wiel (yellow card) 41' (yellow-red card)	Stadium: Stade Vélodrome; Attendance: 35,000; Referee: Ivan Bebek (Croatia)

18 March 2009 Second leg	Ajax (Netherlands)	2 – 2 (a.e.t.) (3 – 4 agg.)	(France) Marseille	Amsterdam, Netherlands
20:45	Enoh 33'; Sulejmani 74'; Silva (red card) 122'	Report	Niang 33'; Mears 109'	Stadium: Amsterdam Arena; Attendance: 47,650; Referee: Florian Meyer (Germany)

=== Amsterdam Tournament ===
8 August 2008	Ajax (Netherlands)	2 – 3	(England) Arsenal	Amsterdam
21:15	Suárez 34'; Huntelaar 36'	Report	Adebayor 67', 83'; Bendtner 75'	Stadium: Amsterdam Arena; Attendance: 35,000; Referee: Kevin Blom

9 August 2008	Ajax (Netherlands)	0 − 1	(Italy) Internazionale	Amsterdam
21:15			Adriano 5'	Stadium: Amsterdam Arena; Attendance: 40,000; Referee: Eric Braamhaar

Final standings of the LG Amsterdam Tournament 2008

Team	Pld	W	D	L	GF	Pts
(England) Arsenal	2	1	1	0	4	8
(Italy) Internazionale	2	1	1	0	1	5
(Spain) Sevilla FC	2	0	2	0	1	3
(Netherlands) Ajax	2	0	0	2	2	2

=== Friendlies ===
19 July 2008	VV Noordwijk (Netherlands)	2 − 5	(Netherlands) Ajax	Noordwijk, Netherlands
15:00	Ketting 14', 38'	Report	Sarpong 13'; Leonardo 20'; Luque 55'; Suárez 90'; Van der Heijden 90'	Stadium: Sportpark Duinwetering; Attendance: 5,500; Referee: Pieter Vink

22 July 2008	CVV Germanicus (Netherlands)	0 − 7	(Netherlands) Ajax	Coevorden, Netherlands
19:30		Report	Cvitanich 14', 20'; Gabri 45'; Bakircioglü 48'; Martina 60'; Leonardo 80'; De Jong 88'	Stadium: Sportpark De Pampert; Attendance: 5,000; Referee: -

24 July 2008	Excelsior '31 (Netherlands)	1 − 8	(Netherlands) Ajax	Rijssen, Netherlands
19:30	Van der Berg 11'	Report	Suárez 8', 30'; Cvitanich 13'; Gabri 20', 42'; Perez 57' (pen.), 88'; Anita 70'	Stadium: Sportpark Grote Geert; Attendance: 3,500; Referee: Eric Braamhaar

1 August 2008	Cardiff City (Wales)	0 − 0	(Netherlands) Ajax	Cardiff, Wales
20:45		Report		Stadium: Ninian Park; Attendance: 11,400; Referee: Mark Whitby

3 August 2008	Sunderland (England)	0 − 1	(Netherlands) Ajax	Sunderland, England
15:00		Report	Huntelaar 54'	Stadium: Stadium Of Light; Attendance: 19,768; Referee: Mark Halsey

16 August 2008	Real Murcia (Spain)	2 − 1	(Netherlands) Ajax	Murcia, Spain
21.30	Despotovic 52'; Dialiba 84'	Report	Suárez 58'	Stadium: Estadio Nueva Condomina; Attendance: 14.000; Referee: Gregorio Bernabé Garcia

10 January 2009	VfB Stuttgart (Germany)	3 − 2	(Netherlands) Ajax	Ferreiras, Portugal
16:00	Lanig 21'; Schieber 29'; Hitzlsperger 40'	Report	Suárez 22'; Cvitanich 65'	Stadium: Estádio da Nora; Attendance: 300; Referee: Paolo Felipe

== Transfers for 2008-09 ==
=== Summer transfer window ===
For a list of all Dutch football transfers in the summer window (1 July 2008 to 1 September 2008) please see List of Dutch football transfers summer 2008.

==== Arrivals ====
- The following players moved to AFC Ajax.

	Name	Position	Transfer type	Previous club	Fee
	Return from loan spell				
Substituted on	(Netherlands) Kenneth Vermeer	Goalkeeper	30 June 2008	(Netherlands) Willem II	-
	Transfer				
Substituted on	(Argentina) Darío Cvitanich	Midfielder	28 April 2008	(Argentina) Banfield	€6,5 million
Substituted on	(Serbia) Miralem Sulejmani	Forward	4 July 2008	(Netherlands) SC Heerenveen	€16,25 million
Substituted on	(Morocco) Ismaïl Aissati	Midfielder	19 July 2008	(Netherlands) PSV	€4,1 million
Substituted on	(Spain) Oleguer	Defender	29 July 2008	(Spain) FC Barcelona	€3 million
Substituted on	(Netherlands) Evander Sno	Midfielder	21 August 2008	(Scotland) Celtic	€1,5 million
	Free Transfer				
Substituted on	(Croatia) Darko Bodul	Forward	14 June 2008	(Netherlands) SC Heerenveen	-
Substituted on	(Cameroon) Eyong Enoh	Midfielder	31 August 2008	(South Africa) Ajax Cape Town	-
Substituted on	(South Africa) Hans Vonk	Goalkeeper	31 August 2008	(South Africa) Ajax Cape Town	-

==== Departures ====
- The following players moved from AFC Ajax.

	Name	Position	Transfer type	New club	Fee
	Out on loan				
Substituted off	(Netherlands) Donovan Slijngard	Defender	27 July 2008	(Netherlands) Sparta Rotterdam	-
Substituted off	(Romania) George Ogăraru	Defender	30 August 2008	(Romania) Steaua București	-
Substituted off	(Spain) Albert Luque	Forward	31 August 2008	(Spain) Málaga CF	-
	Transfer				
Substituted off	(Netherlands) Rydell Poepon	Forward	30 May 2008	(Netherlands) Sparta Rotterdam	€1 million
Substituted off	(Netherlands) John Heitinga	Defender	15 August 2008	(Spain) Atlético Madrid	€12 million
	Free Transfer				
Substituted off	(Netherlands) Edgar Davids	Midfielder	20 May 2008	—	-
Substituted off	(Netherlands) Marco van Duin	Goalkeeper	21 June 2008	(Netherlands) HFC Haarlem	-
Substituted off	(Netherlands) Erik Heijblok	Goalkeeper	30 June 2008	(Netherlands) De Graafschap	-
Substituted off	(Spain) Ismael Urzaíz	Forward	15 July 2008	—	-
Substituted off	(Netherlands) Jurgen Colin	Defender	20 August 2008	(Spain) Sporting de Gijón	-
Substituted off	(Denmark) Michael Krohn-Dehli	Midfielder	29 August 2008	(Denmark) Brøndby IF	-
Substituted off	(Romania) Nicolae Mitea	Forward	31 August 2008	(Romania) Dinamo București	-
Substituted off	(Ghana) Samuel Kuffour	Defender	1 September 2008	(Ghana) Asante Kotoko	-
Substituted off	(Netherlands) Vito Wormgoor	Defender	2 September 2008	(Netherlands) FC Utrecht	-
Substituted off	(Denmark) Kenneth Perez	Midfielder	4 September 2008	(Netherlands) FC Twente	-

=== Winter transfer window ===
For a list of all Dutch football transfers in the winter window (1 January 2009 to 1 February 2009) please see List of Dutch football transfers winter 2008–09.

==== Arrivals ====
- The following players moved to AFC Ajax.

	Name	Position	Transfer type	Previous club	Fee
	Transfer				
Substituted on	(Netherlands) Rob Wielaert	Defender	22 January 2010	(Netherlands) FC Twente	€3,15 million

==== Departures ====
- The following players moved from AFC Ajax.

	Name	Position	Transfer type	New club	Fee
	Out on loan				
Substituted off	(Denmark) Dennis Rommedahl	Forward	20 January 2009	(Netherlands) N.E.C.	-
	Transfer				
Substituted off	(Netherlands) Klaas-Jan Huntelaar	Forward	1 January 2009	(Spain) Real Madrid	€27 million
Substituted off	(Netherlands) John Goossens	Forward	1 February 2009	(Netherlands) N.E.C.	€900,000
	Free Transfer				
Substituted off	(Belgium) Laurent Delorge	Midfielder	6 January 2008	(Netherlands) Roda JC	-
Substituted off	(South Africa) Hans Vonk	Goalkeeper	20 January 2009	(Netherlands) SC Heerenveen	-
