= 2007–08 AFC Ajax season =

Dutch football club season

AFC Ajax
2007–08 season
- Chairman: John Jaakke
- Manager: Henk ten Cate (until September 2007); Adrie Koster (interim)
- Eredivisie: 2nd
- KNVB Cup: Round of 16
- Champions League: Play-off Round
- UEFA Cup: First round
- Johan Cruyff Shield: Winners
- Top goalscorer: League: Klaas-Jan Huntelaar (33 goals); All: Klaas-Jan Huntelaar (36 goals)
Home colours	Away colours	European home colours

During the 2007–08 season, AFC Ajax participated in the Eredivisie, the KNVB Cup, UEFA Champions League and the UEFA Cup. The first training took place on 5 July 2007. The traditional AFC Ajax Open Day was on 8 August.

== Pre-season ==
The first training for the 2007–08 season was held on 5 July 2007. In preparation for the new season, Ajax organized a training camp in De Lutte at the De Thij Sportpark. During the pre-season, the squad played friendly matches against VVSB, GFC, Quick '20 and Go Ahead Eagles before traveling to Scotland to play against Rangers and Falkirk. They then returned to Amsterdam to play Atlético Madrid and Arsenal in the annual Amsterdam Tournament.

== Player statistics ==
Appearances for competitive matches only

No.	Pos	Nat	Player	Total		Eredivisie		UEFA Cup		KNVB Cup	
No.	Pos	Nat	Player	Apps	Goals	Apps	Goals	Apps	Goals	Apps	Goals
1	GK	(Netherlands) NED	Maarten Stekelenburg	35	0	30	0	4	0	1	0
2	DF	(Netherlands) NED	John Heitinga	39	9	32	7	4	0	3	2
3	DF	(Uruguay) URU	Bruno Silva	12	0	12	0	0	0	0	0
4	DF	(Belgium) BEL	Thomas Vermaelen	20	0	16+2	0	2	0	0	0
5	DF	(Netherlands) NED	Urby Emanuelson	36	3	27+3	3	4	0	2	0
6	DF	(Ghana) GHA	Samuel Kuffour	2	0	0+2	0	0	0	0	0
7	FW	(Sweden) SWE	Kennedy Bakircioglu	22	3	12+6	3	2	0	1+1	0
8	FW	(Spain) ESP	Ismael Urzaíz	7	0	0+3	0	0+3	0	1	0
9	FW	(Netherlands) NED	Klaas-Jan Huntelaar	39	36	33	33	4	2	2	1
10	FW	(Spain) ESP	Albert Luque	19	4	9+6	4	0+1	0	2+1	0
11	FW	(Brazil) BRA	Leonardo	8	2	1+7	2	0	0	0	0
12	GK	(Netherlands) NED	Erik Heijblok	1	0	0	0	0	0	1	0
13	MF	(Netherlands) NED	Edgar Davids	14	0	14	0	0	0	0	0
15	MF	(Belgium) BEL	Laurent Delorge	6	1	2+2	1	1+1	0	0	0
16	FW	(Uruguay) URU	Luis Suárez	40	19	29+4	16	3+1	1	3	2
17	MF	(Belgium) BEL	Jan Vertonghen	34	2	27+3	2	0+1	0	3	0
18	MF	(Spain) ESP	Gabri	32	1	25	1	4	0	3	0
19	FW	(Denmark) DEN	Dennis Rommedahl	36	6	13+16	4	3+1	1	0+3	1
20	FW	(Romania) ROU	George Ogăraru	20	0	14+1	0	1+1	0	3	0
21	FW	(Armenia) ARM	Edgar Manucharyan	0	0	0	0	0	0	0	0
23	MF	(Sweden) SWE	Rasmus Lindgren	11	2	9+2	2	0	0	0	0
#	FW	(Romania) ROU	Nicolae Mitea	0	0	0	0	0	0	0	0
24	MF	(Netherlands) NED	Mitchell Donald	4	0	0+2	0	0	0	1+1	0
25	DF	(Netherlands) NED	Gregory van der Wiel	9	0	4+1	0	2	0	2	0
26	MF	(Netherlands) NED	Jeffrey Sarpong	2	0	0+1	0	0+1	0	0	0
27	MF	(Netherlands Antilles) ANT	Vurnon Anita	0	0	0	0	0	0	0	0
28	MF	(Denmark) DEN	Michael Krohn-Dehli	1	0	0+1	0	0	0	0	0
29	MF	(Denmark) DEN	Kenneth Perez	18	8	14+3	8	0	0	1	0
30	GK	(Netherlands) NED	Dennis Gentenaar	6	0	3+2	0	0	0	1	0
31	DF	(Netherlands) NED	Jurgen Colin	15	0	6+6	0	3	0	0	0
32	GK	(Netherlands) NED	Marco van Duin	0	0	0	0	0	0	0	0
33	FW	(Netherlands Antilles) ANT	Javier Martina	0	0	0	0	0	0	0	0
37	MF	(Netherlands) NED	Jan-Arie van der Heijden	2	0	0+2	0	0	0	0	0
38	MF	(Netherlands) NED	Siem de Jong	25	2	13+9	2	0	0	1+2	0
39	DF	(Netherlands) NED	Vito Wormgoor	0	0	0	0	0	0	0	0
Players sold or loaned out after the start of the season:
3	DF	(Netherlands) NED	Jaap Stam	10	0	6	0	4	0	0	0
6	DF	(Netherlands) NED	Hedwiges Maduro	18	5	11+3	4	2	0	2	1
22	FW	(Netherlands) NED	Robbert Schilder	9	0	3+5	0	0	0	0+1	0

As of 14 November 2011

# Nicolae Mitea was issued shirt number 23 at the beginning of the season, however he sat out the season due to injury and was never issued a new shirt number.

== 2007–08 selection by nationality ==
Nationality	(Netherlands)	(Belgium)	(Denmark)	(Spain)	(Romania)	(Sweden)	(Uruguay)	(Netherlands Antilles)	(Armenia)	(Brazil)	(Ghana)	Total Players
Current squad selection	10	3	3	3	2	2	2	1	1	1	1	29
Youth/reserves squad in AFC Ajax selection	5	-	-	-	-	-	-	1	-	-	-	6
Players out on loan	3	-	-	-	-	-	-	-	-	-	-	3

== Team statistics ==
=== Eredivisie standings ===
Standing	Matches played	Wins	Draws	Losses	Points	Goals for	Goals against	Yellow cards (yellow card)	Red cards (red card)
3	34	20	9	5	69	84	45	60	2

==== Points by match day ====
Match day	1	2	3	4	5	6	7	8	9	10	11	12	13	14	15	16	17	18	19	20	21	22	23	24	25	26	27	28	29	30	31	32	33	34	Total
Points	3	3	1	3	3	3	1	1	3	3	1	3	0	3	0	0	1	1	3	1	3	1	3	0	3	3	3	3	1	0	3	3	3	3	69

==== Total points by match day ====
Match day	1	2	3	4	5	6	7	8	9	10	11	12	13	14	15	16	17	18	19	20	21	22	23	24	25	26	27	28	29	30	31	32	33	34	Total
Points	3	6	7	10	13	16	17	18	21	24	25	28	28	31	31	31	32	33	36	37	40	41	44	44	47	50	53	56	57	57	60	63	66	69	69

==== Standing by match day ====
Match day	1	2	3	4	5	6	7	8	9	10	11	12	13	14	15	16	17	18	19	20	21	22	23	24	25	26	27	28	29	30	31	32	33	34	Standing
Standing	1st	1st	3rd	2nd	1st	1st	2nd	3rd	2nd	1st	1st	1st	2nd	1st	2nd	3rd	3rd	3rd	3rd	2nd	2nd	2nd	2nd	3rd	2nd	2nd	2nd	2nd	2nd	2nd	2nd	2nd	2nd	2nd	2nd

==== Goals by match day ====
Match day	1	2	3	4	5	6	7	8	9	10	11	12	13	14	15	16	17	18	19	20	21	22	23	24	25	26	27	28	29	30	31	32	33	34	Total
Goals	8	4	2	1	3	6	2	0	1	4	2	4	1	3	1	2	2	6	1	2	2	0	3	1	6	3	4	4	0	1	4	4	2	5	84

=== 2007–08 statistics ===
- This is an overview of all the statistics for played matches in the 2007-08 season.

	Friendlies	Amsterdam Tournament	Johan Cruyff Shield	KNVB Cup	UEFA Champions League	UEFA Cup	Dubai Cup	Eredivisie	UEFA Champions League Qualifying Play-offs	Total
Matches	7	2	1	3	2	2	2	34	4	57
Wins	5	1	1	2	0	1	0	20	2	32
Draws	1	0	0	0	0	0	0	9	1	11
Losses	1	1	0	1	2	1	2	5	1	14
Home	0	2	1	1	1	1	0	17	2	25
Away	7	0	0	2	1	1	2	17	2	32
Yellow cards (yellow card)	2	2	2	2	5	4	1	60	9	87
Red cards (red card)	0	1	0	0	0	0	1	2	0	4
2 x yellow in 1 match (yellow card) (yellow-red card)	0	0	0	0	0	0	0	1	0	1
Number of substitutes used (substituted on) (substituted off)	33	3	3	3	9	5	5	95	11	175
Goals for	27	2	1	7	1	3	4	94	6	143
Goals against	3	1	0	6	3	3	6	45	4	81
Balance	+24	+1	+1	+1	-2	+0	-2	+45	+2	+62
Clean sheets	5	1	1	0	0	1	0	7	1	16
Penalties for	1	0	0	0	0	0	0	2	1	7
Penalties against	0	0	0	0	0	0	1	0	1	5

=== 2007-08 team records ===
Description	Competition	Result
Biggest win	(Netherlands) Friendly match	GFC - AFC Ajax ( 0 - 9 )
Biggest win	(Netherlands) KNVB Cup	AFC Ajax - SC Heerenveen ( 3 - 1 )
Biggest win	(European Union) UEFA Champions League	—
Biggest win	(European Union) UEFA Cup	Dinamo Zagreb - AFC Ajax ( 0 - 1 )
Biggest win	(Netherlands) Eredivisie	De Graafschap - AFC Ajax ( 1 - 8 )
Biggest loss	(Scotland) Friendly match	Falkirk F.C. - AFC Ajax ( 2 - 1 )
Biggest loss	(Netherlands) KNVB Cup	NAC Breda - AFC Ajax ( 4 - 2 )
Biggest loss	(European Union) UEFA Champions League	Slavia Praha - AFC Ajax ( 2 - 1 )
Biggest loss	(European Union) UEFA Cup	AFC Ajax - Dinamo Zagreb ( 2 - 3 )
Biggest loss	(Netherlands) Eredivisie	AFC Ajax - NAC Breda ( 1 - 3 )
Most goals in a match	(Netherlands) Friendly match	GFC - AFC Ajax ( 0 - 9 )
Most goals in a match	(Netherlands) KNVB Cup	NAC Breda - AFC Ajax ( 4 - 2 )
Most goals in a match	(European Union) UEFA Champions League	Slavia Praha - AFC Ajax ( 2 - 1 )
Most goals in a match	(European Union) UEFA Cup	AFC Ajax - Dinamo Zagreb ( 2 - 3 )
Most goals in a match	(Netherlands) Eredivisie	De Graafschap - AFC Ajax ( 1 - 8 )

==== Top scorers ====
Friendlies

Nr.	Name	Goal
1.	(Netherlands) Wesley Sneijder	6
2.	(Sweden) Kennedy Bakircioglu	4
3.	(Netherlands) Klaas-Jan Huntelaar	3
3.	(Netherlands) Jeffrey Sarpong	3
5.	(Romania) Nicolae Mitea	2
5.	(Spain) Gabri	2
7.	(South Africa) Thembinkosi Fanteni	1
7.	(Netherlands) Edgar Davids	1
7.	(South Africa) Sameegh Doutie	1
7.	(Netherlands) John Heitinga	1
7.	(Belgium) Laurent Delorge	1
7.	(Netherlands Antilles) Javier Martina	1
7.	(Netherlands) Chakib Tayeb	1
Total		27

Johan Cruyff Schaal

Nr.	Name	Goal
1.	(Spain) Gabri	1
Total		1

Eredivisie

Nr.	Name	Goal
1.	(Netherlands) Klaas-Jan Huntelaar	33
2.	(Uruguay) Luis Suárez	16
3.	(Denmark) Kenneth Perez	8
4.	(Netherlands) John Heitinga	7
5.	(Netherlands) Hedwiges Maduro	4
5.	(Spain) Albert Luque	4
5.	(Denmark) Dennis Rommedahl	4
8.	(Sweden) Kennedy Bakircioglu	3
8.	(Netherlands) Urby Emanuelson	3
10.	(Netherlands) Siem de Jong	2
10.	(Belgium) Jan Vertonghen	2
10.	(Brazil) Leonardo	2
10.	(Sweden) Rasmus Lindgren	2
14.	(Belgium) Laurent Delorge	1
14.	(Spain) Gabri	1
Own goals	(Netherlands) Edson Braafheid (Twente)	1
Own goals	(Brazil) Douglas (Twente)	1
Total		93

KNVB Cup

Nr.	Name	Goal
1.	(Netherlands) John Heitinga	2
1.	(Uruguay) Luis Suárez	2
3.	(Denmark) Dennis Rommedahl	1
3.	(Netherlands) Hedwiges Maduro	1
3.	(Netherlands) Klaas-Jan Huntelaar	1
Total		7

UEFA Champions League

Nr.	Name	Goal
1.	(Uruguay) Luis Suárez	1
Total		1

UEFA Cup

Nr.	Name	Goal
1.	(Netherlands) Klaas-Jan Huntelaar	2
2.	(Denmark) Dennis Rommedahl	1
Total		3

Amsterdam Tournament

Nr.	Name	Goal
1.	(Spain) Gabri	1
1.	(Netherlands) Wesley Sneijder	1
Total		2

Dubai Cup

Nr.	Name	Goal
1.	(Denmark) Kenneth Perez	1
1.	(Netherlands) John Heitinga	1
Total		2

== Placements ==
	Friendlies	Amsterdam Tournament	Dubai Cup	KNVB Cup	UEFA Champions League	UEFA Cup	Eredivisie
Status	7 played, 5 wins, 1 draw, 1 loss	3rd place	4th place	Eliminated in Round of 16; Last opponent: NAC Breda	Eliminated in Play-Off round Last opponent: Slavia Prague	Eliminated in First Round; Last opponent: Dinamo Zagreb	3rd place 69 points in 34 matches qualified for UEFA Cup

- Klaas-Jan Huntelaar finishes as topscorer of the Eredivisie with 33 goals in 34 matches.
- Maarten Stekelenburg is voted Player of the Year by the supporters of AFC Ajax.
- Jan Vertonghen is voted Talent of the Year by the supporters of AFC Ajax.
- John Heitinga is voted Dutch Footballer of the Year by De Telegraaf and Football International.
- Klaas-Jan Huntelaar wins the Bronze boots award.

== Results ==
All times are in CEST

=== Johan Cruyff Shield ===
11 August 2007	Ajax	1–0	PSV	Amsterdam
20:00 CEST	Gabri 43'			Stadium: Amsterdam Arena; Attendance: 47,500; Referee: Ruud Bossen

=== Eredivisie ===
19 August 2007 1	De Graafschap	1−8	Ajax	Doetinchem
12:30	De Groot 72'	Report	Huntelaar 36', 61', 90', 91'; Suárez 42'; Maduro 55', 59'; Bakircioglu 61'	Stadium: De Vijverberg; Attendance: 11.000; Referee: Pieter Vink

26 August 2007 2	Ajax	4−1	Heerenveen	Amsterdam
14:30	Suárez 44', 57'; Vermaelen 45'; Schilder 52'		Sulejmani 27'	Stadium: Amsterdam Arena; Attendance: 48.988; Referee: Dick Jol

2 September 2007 3	Ajax	2−2	Groningen	Amsterdam
14:30	Suárez 33'; Huntelaar 83'		Berg 36', 60'	Stadium: Amsterdam Arena; Attendance: 47,445; Referee: Kevin Blom

15 September 2007 4	Heracles	0−1	Ajax	Almelo
20:00			Huntelaar 76'	Stadium: Polman Stadion; Attendance: 8.500; Referee: Roelof Luinge

23 September 2007 5	AZ	2–3	Ajax	Alkmaar
11:30	De Zeeuw 45'; Dembélé 90+2'		Huntelaar 33'; Suárez 43', 65'	Stadium: AFAS Stadion; Attendance: 16.500; Referee: Pieter Vink

30 September 2007 6	Ajax	6−1	VVV-Venlo	Amsterdam
14:30	Luque 16', 19'; Maduro 27'; Rommedahl 32'; Delorge 77'; Huntelaar 89'	Report	Soltani 4'	Stadium: Amsterdam Arena; Attendance: 49,126; Referee: Tom van Sichem

7 October 2007 7	Sparta Rotterdam	2−2	Ajax	Rotterdam
12:30	Dissels 52'; De Roover 80'		Huntelaar 68'; De Jong 90'	Stadium: Het Kasteel; Attendance: 11,000; Referee: Dick Jol

20 October 2007 8	Ajax	0−0	NEC	Amsterdam
19:30				Stadium: Amsterdam Arena; Attendance: 48,123; Referee: Jack van Hulten

28 October 2007 9	Utrecht	0−1	Ajax	Utrecht
12:30			Huntelaar 68'	Stadium: Stadio Galgenwaard; Attendance: 23.300; Referee: Ben Haverkort

4 November 2007 10	Ajax	4−2	Roda JC	Amsterdam
14:30	Huntelaar 22'; Suárez 42'; Luque 47'; Rommedahl 90'		Lamah 38'; Hadouir 76'	Stadium: Amsterdam Arena; Attendance: 48,621; Referee: Dick Jol

11 November 2007 11	Feyenoord	2–2	Ajax	Rotterdam
12:30	Van Bronckhorst 28'; De Guzmán 74'	Report	Rommedahl 52'; De Jong 67'	Stadium: Stadion Feijenoord; Attendance: 42,500; Referee: Frank de Bleeckere

25 November 2007 12	Ajax	4–1	Vitesse	Amsterdam
14:30	Suárez 17'; Gabri 27'; Luque 44'; Huntelaar 82'		Junker 45'	Stadium: Amsterdam Arena; Attendance: 49,566; Referee: Jan Wegereef

2 December 2007 13	Ajax	1–3	NAC Breda	Amsterdam
14:30	Huntelaar 90'		Vertonghen 25' (o.g.); Amoah 69'; Ammi 88'	Stadium: Amsterdam Arena; Attendance: 47,588; Referee: Kevin Blom

8 December 2007 14	Willem II	2–3	Ajax	Tilburg
19:30	Bobson 6'; Swinkels 75'		Bakircioglu 2'; Suárez 29'; Vertonghen 46'	Stadium: Willem II Stadion; Attendance: 14.044; Referee: Jack van Hulten

23 December 2007 15	Excelsior	2–1	Ajax	Rotterdam
12:30	Piqué 1'; Den Ouden 49'	Report	Maduro 63'	Stadium: Stadion Woudestein; Attendance: 3,500; Referee: Bas Nijhuis

27 December 2007 16	Ajax	2–2	Twente	Amsterdam
20:15	Huntelaar 31'; Braafheid 76' (o.g.)		Huysegems 60'; Nkufo 90'	Stadium: Amsterdam Arena; Attendance: 50,523; Referee: Roelof Luinge

30 December 2007 17	VVV-Venlo	2–2	Ajax	Venlo
12:30	Ofrany 57'; Calabro 88'		Suárez 37'; Huntelaar 77'; Ogăraru (red card) 86'	Stadium: De Koel; Attendance: 6,000; Referee: Björn Kuipers

13 January 2008 18	Ajax	6–1	AZ	Amsterdam
14:30	Vertonghen 23'; Perez 43' (pen.); Huntelaar 61', 89'; Bakircioglu 67'; Leonardo 87'		Ari 5'; De Zeeuw (red card) 42'	Stadium: Amsterdam Arena; Attendance: 50,639; Referee: Roelof Luinge

20 January 2008 19	NEC	1–1	Ajax	Nijmegen
12:30	Lens 16'		Huntelaar 74'	Stadium: Stadion de Goffert; Attendance: 12,400; Referee: Dick Jol

23 January 2008 20	Ajax	2–0	Utrecht	Amsterdam
19:30	Huntelaar 68'; Heitinga 77'		Keller (red card) 71'	Stadium: Amsterdam Arena; Attendance: 45,537; Referee: Pieter Vink

27 January 2008 21	Vitesse	2–2	Ajax	Arnhem
12:30	Junker 8'; Gommans 55'		Emanuelson 46'; Suárez 50'	Stadium: GelreDome; Attendance: 22,700; Referee: Eric Braamhaar

30 January 2008 22	Ajax	0–2	PSV	Amsterdam
20:45	Davids (red card) 90+3'		Dzsudzsák 41'; Bakkal 73'	Stadium: Amsterdam Arena; Attendance: 49.822; Referee: Jan Wegereef

3 February 2008 23	Ajax	3–0	Feyenoord	Amsterdam
12:30	Heitinga 8'; Huntelaar 45', 90+1'			Stadium: Amsterdam Arena; Attendance: 49,893; Referee: Jack van Hulten

10 February 2008 24	Roda JC	2–1	Ajax	Kerkrade
12:30	Lamah 21'; Hadouir 79'		Huntelaar 38'	Stadium: Parkstad Limburg Stadion; Attendance: 17,800; Referee: Serge Gumienny

15 February 2008 25	Ajax	6–2	Sparta Rotterdam	Amsterdam
20:30	Heitinga 14', 39'; Huntelaar 29'; Lindgren 31'; Perez 40', 81'		Roberts 34'; Emnes 82'	Stadium: Amsterdam Arena; Attendance: 49,260; Referee: Bas Nijhuis

24 February 2008 26	NAC Breda	2–3	Ajax	Breda
12:30	Amoah 50'; Penders 58'		Huntelaar 21'; Emanuelson 76'; Heitinga 81'	Stadium: Rat Verlegh Stadion; Attendance: 16,500; Referee: Roelof Luinge

2 March 2008 27	Ajax	4–0	Excelsior	Amsterdam
14:30	Huntelaar 26', 40'; Emanuelson 54'; Leonardo 85'			Stadium: Amsterdam Arena; Attendance: 49,313; Referee: Björn Kuipers

16 March 2008 28	Ajax	4–1	Willem II	Amsterdam
14:30	Huntelaar 29'; Luis Suárez 45', 51', 89'		Demouge 18'	Stadium: Amsterdam Arena; Attendance: 49,918; Referee: Kevin Blom

19 March 2008 29	PSV	0–0	Ajax	Eindhoven
20:45				Stadium: Philips Stadion; Attendance: 35,000; Referee: Eric Braamhaar

23 March 2008 30	Twente	2–1	Ajax	Enschede
14:30	Wilkshire 71'; Elia 92'		Douglas 63' (o.g.)	Stadium: Arke Stadion; Attendance: 13,250; Referee: Jack van Hulten

29 March 2008 31	Heerenveen	2–4	Ajax	Heerenveen
19:30	Sulejmani 59'; Pranjić 91'		Suárez 45'; Perez 55' (pen.); Huntelaar 61', 89'	Stadium: Abe Lenstra Stadion; Attendance: 25,000; Referee: Pieter Vink

6 April 2008 32	Ajax	4–1	De Graafschap	Amsterdam
14:30	Huntelaar 4', 9', 41'; Perez 63'		Tarvajärvi 32'	Stadium: Amsterdam Arena; Attendance: 50,057; Referee: Bas Nijhuis

16 April 2008 33	Groningen	1–2	Ajax	Groningen
19:30	Cahais 45+1'		Lindgren 18'; Suárez 66'	Stadium: Euroborg; Attendance: 19,011; Referee: Eric Braamhaar

20 April 2008 34	Ajax	5–1	Heracles	Amsterdam
14:30	Suárez 4'; Perez 18', 73'; Huntelaar 29'; Heitinga 79'		Klavan 54'	Stadium: Amsterdam Arena; Attendance: 50,139; Referee: Roelof Luinge

=== Play-offs ===
Round 1

1 May 2008 1st Leg	Heerenveen	1–2	Ajax	Heerenveen
14:30	Sibon 71'		Suárez 61'; Heitinga 76'	Stadium: Abe Lenstra Stadion; Attendance: 23,000; Referee: Eric Braamhaar

5 May 2008 2nd Leg	Ajax	3–1 (5 – 2 agg.)	Heerenveen	Amsterdam
20:15	Perez 45' (pen.), 55'; Rommedahl 48'		Bradley (red card) 38'; Pranjić 63'	Stadium: Amsterdam Arena; Attendance: 49,144; Referee: Dick van Egmond

Round 2

10 May 2008 1st Leg	Twente	2–1	Ajax	Emmen
19:40	Nkufo 66' (pen.), 77'		Suárez 44'	Stadium: Univé Stadion; Attendance: 8,000; Referee: Ben Haverkort

18 May 2008 2nd Leg	Ajax	0–0 (1 – 2 agg.)	Twente	Amsterdam
14:30				Stadium: Amsterdam Arena; Attendance: 44,500; Referee: Pieter Vink

=== KNVB Cup ===
26 September 2007 2nd round	Kozakken Boys	1−2 (a.e.t.)	Ajax	Werkendam
20:00	Looijen 88'	Report	Heitinga 26'; Rommedahl 104'	Stadium: Sportpark de Zwaaier; Attendance: 5,000; Referee: Jan Wegereef

31 October 2007 3rd round	Ajax	3−1	Heerenveen	Amsterdam
18:30	Heitinga 7'; Maduro 28'; Huntelaar 67'		Bradley 72'	Stadium: Amsterdam Arena; Attendance: 18,724; Referee: Ruud Bossen

16 January 2008 Round of 16	NAC Breda	4−2	Ajax	Breda
18:30	Elshot 21'; Ammi 67'; Zwaanswijk 70'; Lurling 77'	Report	Suárez 66', 86'	Stadium: Rat Verlegh Stadion; Attendance: 17,000; Referee: Kevin Blom

=== UEFA Champions League ===
==== Third qualifying round ====
15 August 2007 First leg	Ajax (Netherlands)	0–1	(Czech Republic) Slavia Prague	Amsterdam, Netherlands
20:30		Report	Kalivoda 76' (pen.)	Stadium: Amsterdam Arena; Attendance: 30,019; Referee: Florian Meyer (German)

29 August 2007 Second leg	Slavia Prague (Czech Republic)	2–1 (3–1 agg.)	(Netherlands) Ajax	Prague, Czech Republic
20:30	Vicek 22', 86'	Report	Suárez 33'	Stadium: Stadion Evžena Rošického; Attendance: 19,000; Referee: Claus Bo Larsen (Denmark)

=== UEFA Cup ===
First round

20 September 2007 1st Leg	Dinamo Zagreb (Croatia)	0 – 1	(Netherlands) Ajax	Zagreb, Croatia
21:00		Report	Rommedahl 62'	Stadium: Maksimir Stadion; Attendance: 30,000; Referee: Stéphane Lannoy (France)

4 October 2007 2nd Leg	Ajax (Netherlands)	2–3 (a.e.t.) (3–3 agg.)	(Croatia) Dinamo Zagreb	Amsterdam
19:30	Huntelaar 101', 119'	Report	Modrić 33' (pen.); Mandžukić 93', 96'	Stadium: Amsterdam Arena; Attendance: 44,678; Referee: Mark Clattenburg (England)

=== Amsterdam Tournament ===
2 August 2007	Ajax (Netherlands)	2−0	(Spain) Atlético Madrid	Amsterdam
20:45	Gabri 45', (red card) 90'; Sneijder 59'	Report		Stadium: Amsterdam Arena; Attendance: 15,000; Referee: Eric Braamhaar

4 August 2007	Ajax (Netherlands)	0−1	(England) Arsenal	Amsterdam
21:15		Report	Van Persie 86'	Stadium: Amsterdam Arena; Attendance: 30,000; Referee: Kevin Blom

Final standings of the LG Amsterdam Tournament 2007

Team	Pld	W	D	L	GF	Pts
(England) Arsenal	2	2	0	0	3	9
(Spain) Atlético Madrid	2	1	0	1	3	6
(Netherlands) Ajax	2	1	0	1	2	5
(Italy) Lazio	2	0	0	2	2	2

=== Dubai Cup ===
5 January 2008	Internazionale (Italy)	2−2	(Netherlands) Ajax	Dubai, United Arab Emirates
18:00	Cruz 16', 68'	Report	Perez 18'; Heitinga 63' (pen.)	Stadium: Al Wasl Stadium; Attendance: - Referee: Ali Hamad

7 January 2008	VfB Stuttgart (Germany)	1−0	(Netherlands) Ajax	Dubai, United Arab Emirates
15:00	Farnerud 88'	Report	Maduro (red card) 7'	Stadium: Al Wasl Stadium; Attendance: - Referee: -

Final standings of the Mohammed Bin Rashid International Football Championship Dubai 2008

(Netherlands) Ajax	KNVB Cup – 4th place
(Italy) Internazionale	2006–07 Serie A – Runner-up
(Brazil) Internacional	2006 FIFA Club World Cup – Winner
(Germany) VfB Stuttgart	2006–07 Bundesliga – 3rd place

Semi-finals
5 January
(Brazil) Internacional	1
(Germany) VfB Stuttgart	0
5 January
(Italy) Internazionale	2(5)
(Netherlands) Ajax	2(4)

Final
7 January
(Brazil) Internacional	2
(Italy) Internazionale	1
Third place
7 January
(Netherlands) Ajax	0
(Germany) VfB Stuttgart	1

=== Friendlies ===
14 July 2007	VVSB (Netherlands)	0−4	(Netherlands) Ajax	Noordwijkerhout, Netherlands
15:00		Report	Bakircioglu 7', 34'; Fanteni 42'; Mitea 89'	Stadium: Sportpark de Boekhorst; Attendance: 4,000; Referee: Pieter Vink

16 July 2007	GFC (Netherlands)	0−9	(Netherlands) Ajax	Goor, Netherlands
19:30		Report	Huntelaar 12'; Davids 14'; Sneijder 16', 31', 37'; Mitea 25'; Gabri 56', 82'; Doutie 76'	Stadium: Sportpark de Horst; Attendance: 3,000; Referee: Bas Nijhuis

18 July 2007	Quick '20 (Netherlands)	0−8	(Netherlands) Ajax	Oldenzaal, Netherlands
19:30		Report	Sneijder 23', 79', 90'; Sarpong 25', 65', 68'; Bakircioglu 51', 73'	Stadium: Sportpark de Vondersweijde; Attendance: 4,000; Referee: Luuk Hoopman

21 July 2007	Go Ahead Eagles (Netherlands)	0−1	(Netherlands) Ajax	Deventer, Netherlands
16:00		Report	Huntelaar 25'	Stadium: De Adelaarshorst; Attendance: 6,700; Referee: Dick Jol

24 July 2007	Rangers (Scotland)	1−1	(Netherlands) Ajax	Glasgow, Scotland
19:45	Cuéllar 19'	Report	Heitinga 61'	Stadium: Ibrox Stadium; Attendance: 32,770; Referee: Kenneth Clark

28 July 2007	Falkirk (Scotland)	2−1	(Netherlands) Ajax	Falkirk, Scotland
15.00	Craig 65'; Mitchell 88'	Report	Delorge 84'	Stadium: Falkirk Stadium; Attendance: 3,378; Referee: Willie Collum

28 May 2008	DVS '33 (Netherlands)	0−3	(Netherlands) Ajax	Ermelo, Netherlands
19:30		Report	Martina 27'; Tayeb 50'; Sarpong 83'	Stadium: Sportpark DVS; Attendance: 2,500; Referee: Roelof Luinge

== 2007–08 transfers ==
=== Summer transfer window ===
For a list of all Dutch football transfers in the summer window (1 July 2007 to 1 September 2007), please see List of Dutch football transfers summer 2007.

==== Arrivals ====
- The following players moved to AFC Ajax.

	Name	Position	Transfer type	Previous club	Fee
	Return from loan spell				
Substituted on	(Denmark) Michael Krohn-Dehli	Midfielder	15 May 2007	(Netherlands) Sparta Rotterdam	-
Substituted on	(Netherlands) Robbert Schilder	Defender	15 May 2007	(Netherlands) Heracles	-
Substituted on	(Netherlands) Donovan Slijngard	Midfielder	15 May 2007	(Netherlands) Groningen	-
Substituted on	(Belgium) Jan Vertonghen	Midfielder	15 May 2007	(Netherlands) RKC Waalwijk	-
	Transfer				
Substituted on	(Belgium) Laurent Delorge	Midfielder	10 May 2007	(Netherlands) ADO Den Haag	€800,000
Substituted on	(Denmark) Dennis Rommedahl	Forward	20 July 2007	(England) Charlton Athletic	€1,000,000
Substituted on	(Netherlands) Jürgen Colin	Defender	1 August 2007	(England) Norwich City	€100,000
Substituted on	(Uruguay) Luis Suárez	Forward	10 August 2007	(Netherlands) Groningen	€7,500,000
Substituted on	(Spain) Albert Luque	Forward	25 August 2007	(England) Newcastle United	€8,200,000
	Free Transfer				
Substituted on	(Netherlands) Erik Heijblok	Goalkeeper	1 July 2007	(Netherlands) HFC Haarlem	-
Substituted on	(Sweden) Kennedy Bakircioglu	Forward	18 July 2007	(Netherlands) Twente	-
Substituted on	(Spain) Ismael Urzaíz	Forward	19 July 2007	(Spain) Athletic Bilbao	-

==== Departures ====
- The following players moved from AFC Ajax.

	Name	Position	Transfer type	New club	Fee
	Out on loan				
Substituted off	(Netherlands) Rydell Poepon	Forward	30 January 2007	(Netherlands) Willem II	-
Substituted off	(Netherlands) Kenneth Vermeer	Goalkeeper	24 May 2007	(Netherlands) Willem II	-
	Transfer				
Substituted off	(Belgium) Tom De Mul	Forward	9 July 2007	(Spain) Sevilla	€4,500,000
Substituted off	(Denmark) Kenneth Perez	Forward	11 July 2007	(Netherlands) PSV	€1,500,000
Substituted off	(Netherlands) Ryan Babel	Forward	13 July 2007	(England) Liverpool	€11,500,000
Substituted off	(Netherlands) Wesley Sneijder	Midfielder	12 August 2007	(Spain) Real Madrid	€27,000,000
	Free Transfer				
Substituted off	(Czech Republic) Zdeněk Grygera	Defender	4 June 2007	(Italy) Juventus	-
Substituted off	(Ghana) Emmanuel Boakye	Defender	18 June 2007	(Netherlands) Heracles	-
Substituted off	(Netherlands) Michael Timisela	Defender	6 July 2007	(Netherlands) VVV-Venlo	-
Substituted off	(Spain) Roger	Midfielder	7 July 2007	—	-
Substituted off	(Netherlands) Derk Boerrigter	Forward	16 July 2007	(Netherlands) FC Zwolle	-
Substituted off	(Netherlands) Olaf Lindenbergh	Midfielder	31 August 2007	(Netherlands) Sparta Rotterdam	-

=== Winter transfer window ===
For a list of all Dutch football transfers in the winter window (1 January 2008 to 1 February 2008) please see List of Dutch football transfers winter 2007–08.

==== Arrivals ====
- The following players moved to AFC Ajax.

	Name	Position	Transfer type	Previous club	Fee
	Loan				
Substituted on	(Ghana) Samuel Kuffour	Defender	28 January 2008	(Italy) Roma	-
	Transfer				
Substituted on	(Denmark) Kenneth Perez	Forward	1 January 2008	(Netherlands) PSV	€1,250,000
Substituted on	(Uruguay) Bruno Silva	Defender	20 January 2008	(Netherlands) Groningen	€3,750,000
Substituted on	(Sweden) Rasmus Lindgren	Midfielder	28 January 2008	(Netherlands) Groningen	€3,500,000

==== Departures ====
- The following players moved from AFC Ajax.

	Name	Position	Transfer type	New club	Fee
	Out on loan				
Substituted off	(Netherlands) Robbert Schilder	Defender	30 January 2008	(Netherlands) Heracles	-
	Transfer				
Substituted off	(Netherlands) Hedwiges Maduro	Defender	18 January 2008	(Spain) Valencia	€6,500,000
	Free Transfer				
Substituted off	(Netherlands) Jaap Stam	Defender	27 October 2007	—	-
