= Erik Heijblok =

Dutch footballer

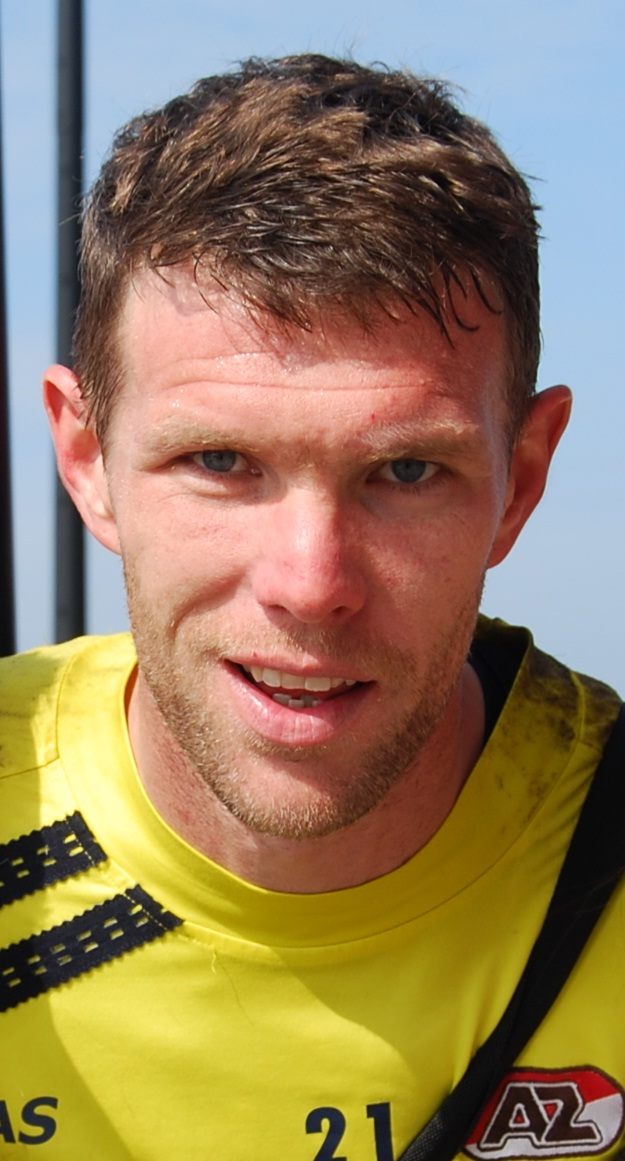
- Heijblok with AZ in 2011

Personal information
- Full name: Erik Willem Heijblok
- Date of birth: 29 May 1977 (age 49)
- Place of birth: Den Oever, Netherlands
- Height: 1.96 m (6 ft 5 in)
- Position: Goalkeeper

Team information
- Current team: Porto (goalkeeper coach)

Youth career
- Wiron
- Hollandia

Senior career*
Years	Team	Apps	(Gls)
2003–2007	Haarlem	126	(0)
2007–2008	Ajax	0	(0)
2008–2009	De Graafschap	34	(0)
2009–2014	AZ	0	(0)
2014	Volendam	2	(0)
Total		162	(0)

Managerial career
- 2015–2022: Ajax–youth (goalkeeper coach)
- 2022–2024: Ajax–U21 (goalkeeper coach)
- 2024–2026: Ajax (goalkeeper coach)
- 2026–: Porto (goalkeeper coach)
- * Club domestic league appearances and goals

Erik Willem Heijblok (born 29 May 1977) is a Dutch retired footballer who played as a goalkeeper.

== Career ==
Hailing from Den Oever, Heijblok started his career at local outfit Wiron, then played for fellow amateur side Hollandia before signing his first professional contract at Haarlem in 2003, where he became their first goalkeeper straight away. In four seasons, he had made 126 appearances for the club, all at the Eerste Divisie level. He then signed for Eredivisie side Ajax, where he became their third goalkeeper behind Maarten Stekelenburg and Dennis Gentenaar for the 2007–08 season.

After Ajax, Heijblok signed for Eredivisie side De Graafschap on 30 June 2008. After one season, he then transferred to 2008–09 Eredivisie champions AZ on 24 June 2009 for two seasons.

He eventually stayed until the summer of 2014, having served the team as a third goalkeeper for five years. He signed a one-year deal with Eerste Divisie side Volendam on 30 June 2014. Shortly after, in September 2014, he announced his retirement from football, citing health-related issues linked to playing on artificial turf.

After retiring as a player, Heijblok became a goalkeeper coach at Ajax. He left them in 2026 for Portuguese giants Porto.

== Honours ==
AZ

- KNVB Cup: 2012–13
