= George Ogăraru =

Romanian footballer and manager (born 1980)

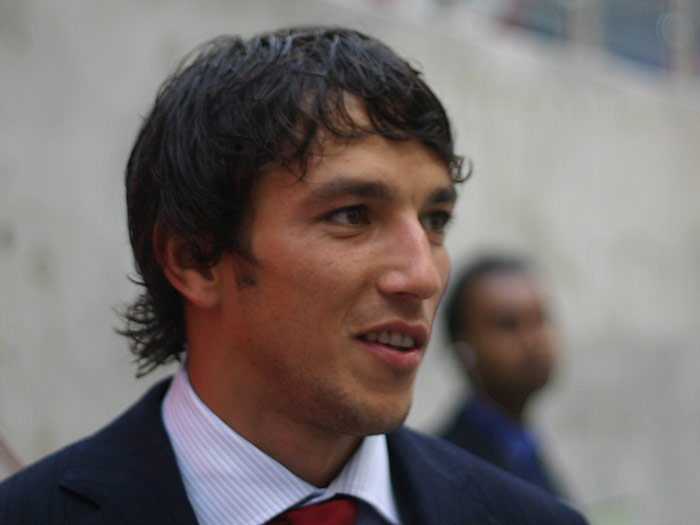
- Ogăraru in 2007

Personal information
- Full name: George Ogăraru
- Date of birth: 3 February 1980 (age 46)
- Place of birth: Bucharest, Romania
- Height: 1.78 m (5 ft 10 in)
- Position: Right-back

Team information
- Current team: CSA Steaua București (technical youth center director)

Youth career
- 1991–1998: Steaua București

Senior career*
Years	Team	Apps	(Gls)
1998–2006	Steaua București	107	(3)
2000–2001	→ CSM Reșița (loan)	25	(1)
2001–2002	→ Oțelul Galați (loan)	20	(1)
2006–2010	Ajax	48	(0)
2008–2009	→ Steaua București (loan)	20	(0)
2010–2012	Sion	31	(2)
Total		251	(7)

International career
1998–1999	Romania U18	2	(0)
1999–2000	Romania U21	5	(0)
2003–2009	Romania	12	(0)

Managerial career
- 2013–2014: Jong Ajax (assistant)
- 2014–2015: Universitatea Cluj
- 2016: Ajax U18
- 2016–2017: Jong Ajax (assistant)
- 2019: Viitorul Constanța (director of scouting)
- 2020–2021: CSA Steaua București (Executive president)
- 2021–: CSA Steaua București (technical youth center director)
- * Club domestic league appearances and goals

George Ogăraru (born 3 February 1980) is a Romanian former professional footballer who played as a right-back, currently technical youth center director at Liga II club CSA Steaua București.

== Club career ==
Ogăraru is one of the players that were promoted by Steaua București's youth club. He started his professional football career playing for Steaua at 18 years old. He debuted in Divizia A on 28 November 1998 in a victory against Olimpia Satu Mare with 3–0. In his first and second seasons at Steaua he was a substitute player and played only 7 games but did not score any goals.

In the 2000–01 season he was loaned at CSM Reșița in Divizia B, where he played in 25 games and scored once.

He was loaned again in 2001–02 season, this time at Oțelul Galați. There he played 20 games and scored a goal.

In 2002 when Mihai Stoica, the president of Oțelul Galați became the general manager of Steaua, he took Ogăraru with him at his first team. Ogăraru became a basic player in Steaua's first eleven and in a few years his value grew very much. On 7 June 2006 Ogararu won the Divizia A championship and also played his last game for Steaua in the win against FC Vaslui with 4–0.

He played for Steaua in UEFA Cup in 30 games but did not score any goal. The best seasons in UEFA Cup were in 2004–2005 when they qualified from the groups and succeeded to eliminate in the next tour Valencia, the ex-winner of UEFA Cup and especially in the season 2005–2006 when they played in the semifinals but they were defeated by Middlesbrough after the away-match in England ended 4–2 for Boro.

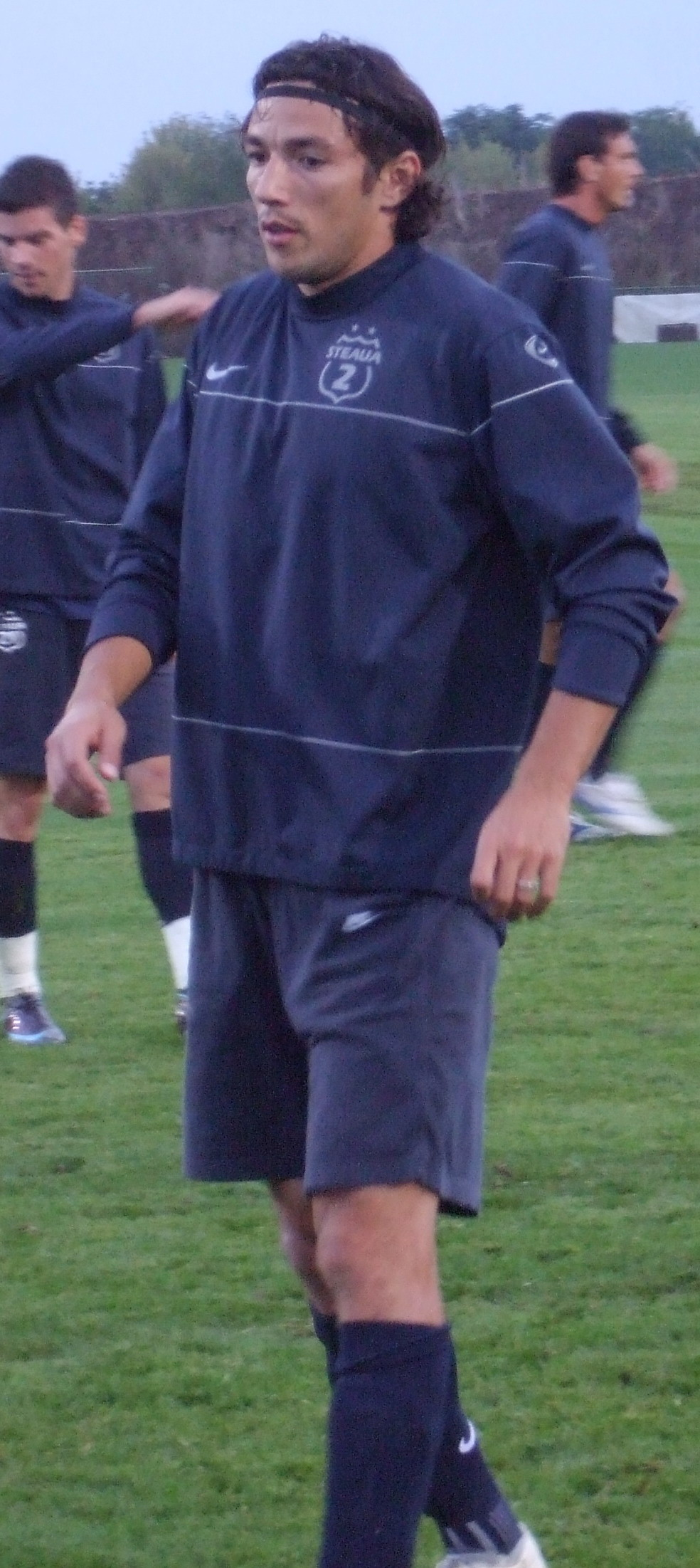
George Ogăraru training at FCSB.

=== Ajax ===
In the summer break of 2006 Ajax signed Ogăraru. He debuted for Ajax in an official game on 20 August 2006 against RKC Waalwijk and his team won, 5–0. On 13 August 2006 Ajax, with Ogăraru on the field from the first minute, won the Dutch Super Cup against PSV Eindhoven with 3–1.

The second trophy won by Ogararu with Ajax was the Dutch Cup.

==== Steaua comeback ====
On 30 August 2008, he was loaned out to Steaua București until June 2009.

=== Sion ===
On 30 June 2010 Sion signed the Romanian right-back from Ajax on a free transfer until 30 June 2012.

=== Seattle Sounders ===
Ogăraru was training with Seattle Sounders FC of Major League Soccer. On 9 September 2012 he was on the Sounders' bench for their reserves match against Chivas USA, then subbed on for fellow trialist Eiður Guðjohnsen to start the second half.

== International career ==
Ogăraru earned his first cap for Romania on 26 March 2005, in a 2–0 loss against the Netherlands. After that match, Victor Pițurcă repeatedly dropped Ogăraru from the squad saying that he had an average performance at Ajax Amsterdam.

He was called up by Pițurcă after two years and six months, on 9 October 2007 against Netherlands, the same team against which he played his last game for Romania.

== Personal life ==
Marius Lăcătuș became the godfather of Ogăraru's second child on 6 January 2007. He is also the godfather of Eric, Ogăraru's first child.

On 16 November 2007, Ogăraru launched his own website, with photos and videos from official matches and training sessions. He also has a blog in which he talks with his fans. The site has two versions, one in English and one in Romanian.

== Career statistics ==
=== Club ===
Appearances and goals by club, season and competition
Club	Season	League			Cup		Continental		Other		Total	
Club	Season	Division	Apps	Goals	Apps	Goals	Apps	Goals	Apps	Goals	Apps	Goals
Steaua București	1998–99	Divizia A	5	0	2	0	–		–		7	0
Steaua București	1999–2000	Divizia A	7	0	0	0	1 (Note: Appearances in UEFA Cup)	0	1 (Note: Appearance in Supercupa României)	0	9	0
Steaua București	2002–03	Divizia A	23	0	2	0	–		–		25	0
Steaua București	2003–04	Divizia A	16	0	2	0	3	0	–		21	0
Steaua București	2004–05	Divizia A	28	2	1	0	12	0	–		41	2
Steaua București	2005–06	Divizia A	28	1	0	0	18 (Note: Four appearances in UEFA Champions League, fourteen appearances in UEFA Cup)	0	1	0	47	1
Steaua București	Total		107	3	7	0	34	0	2	0	150	3
CSM Reșița (loan)	2000–01	Divizia B	25	1	0	0	–		–		25	1
Oțelul Galați (loan)	2001–02	Divizia A	20	1	0	0	–		–		20	1
Ajax	2006–07	Eredivisie	28	0	5	0	6	0	1 (Note: Appearances in Johan Cruyff Shield)	0	40	0
Ajax	2007–08	Eredivisie	16	0	3	0	2	0	1	0	22	0
Ajax	2008–09	Eredivisie	0	0	–		–		–		0	0
Ajax	2009–10	Eredivisie	0	0	1	0	0	0	–		1	0
Ajax	Total		44	0	9	0	8	0	2	0	63	0
Steaua București (loan)	2008–09	Liga I	20	0	0	0	4 (Note: Appearance in UEFA Champions League)	0	–		24	0
Sion	2010–11	Swiss Super League	28	2	3	2	–		–		31	4
Sion	2011–12	Swiss Super League	3	0	0	0	0	0	–		3	0
Sion	Total		31	2	3	2	–		–		34	4
Career total			251	7	19	2	46	0	4	0	320	9

=== International ===
Appearances and goals by national team and year
National team	Year	Apps	Goals
Romania	2003	1	0
Romania	2004	0	0
Romania	2005	1	0
Romania	2006	0	0
Romania	2007	4	0
Romania	2008	5	0
Romania	2009	1	0
Total		12	0

== Managerial statistics ==
As of 28 February 2015

Team	From	To	Record							
Team	From	To	G	W	D	L	GF	GA	GD	Win %
Universitatea Cluj	3 September 2014	1 March 2015	17	4	6	7	19	24	−5	23.53
Total			17	4	6	7	19	24	−5	23.53

== Honours ==
=== Player ===
Steaua București

- Divizia A: 2004–05, 2005–06
- Cupa României: 1998–99
- Supercupa României runner-up: 1999, 2005

Ajax

- KNVB Cup: 2006–07, 2009–10
- Johan Cruyff Shield: 2006, 2007

Sion

- Swiss Cup: 2010–11
