= Marco van Duin =

Dutch footballer

Personal information
- Full name: Marco Rudolf van Duin
- Date of birth: 11 February 1987 (age 39)
- Place of birth: Warmenhuizen, Netherlands
- Height: 1.90 m (6 ft 3 in)
- Position: Goalkeeper

Youth career
- VIOS-W
- Ajax

Senior career*
Years	Team	Apps	(Gls)
2007–2008	Ajax	0	(0)
2008–2010	Haarlem	32	(0)
2010	Volendam	0	(0)
2010–2012	NEC	0	(0)
2012–2013	Sparta	0	(0)
2013–2015	Almere City	52	(0)
2015–2019	NEC	15	(0)
2019–2020	Groningen	0	(0)
Total		99	(0)

International career
2008	Netherlands U20	1	(0)
- * Club domestic league appearances and goals

Marco Rudolf van Duin (Dutch pronunciation: [ˈmɑrkoː ˈrydɔl(ə) fɑn ˈdœyn]; (Note: In isolation, Rudolf and van are pronounced [ˈrydɔl(ə)f] and [vɑn], respectively.) born 11 February 1987) is a Dutch retired footballer who played as a goalkeeper. He had formerly played for Haarlem, FC Volendam, Sparta Rotterdam and Almere City, NEC and FC Groningen.

== Club career ==
Van Duin progressed through the Ajax youth academy, before being promoted to the first team from Jong Ajax in 2007. In the summer of 2008, he joined HFC Haarlem, where he played his first professional game on 17 October 2008 against Excelsior.

After Haarlem's bankruptcy Van Duin moved to FC Volendam on a free transfer on 5 February 2010. In the following summer Van Duin signed a contract with NEC as third goalkeeper. After two seasons he joined Sparta Rotterdam as a free agent. In July 2013 he signed a one-year contract with Almere City. After two seasons at Almere he rejoined his former side NEC.

Van Duin announced his retirement from football after leaving FC Groningen in the spring of 2020. He continues a goalkeeper coach at former club, NEC.

== International career ==
Van Duin played once for the Netherlands national under-20 football team.
