= Bruno Silva (footballer, born 1980) =

Uruguayan footballer

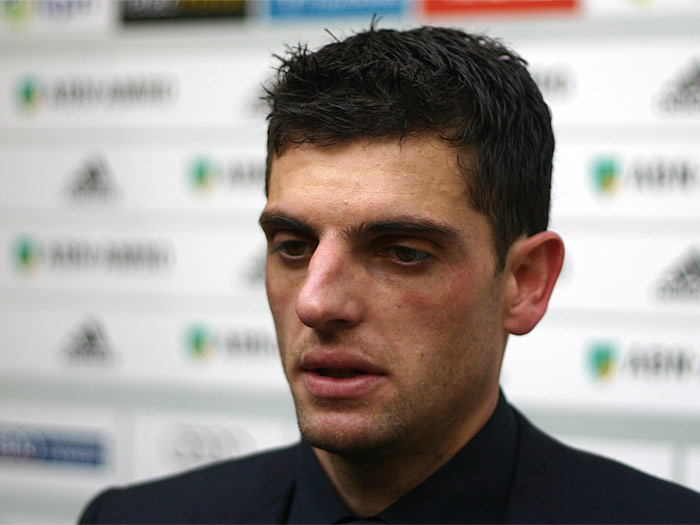

Personal information
- Full name: Bruno Ramón Silva Barone
- Date of birth: 29 March 1980 (age 46)
- Place of birth: Isidoro Noblía, Uruguay
- Height: 1.80 m (5 ft 11 in)
- Position: Right back

Team information
- Current team: Cerro Largo (manager)

Youth career
- 1999–2000: Danubio

Senior career*
Years	Team	Apps	(Gls)
2000–2003	Danubio	83	(4)
2004	Rostov	4	(0)
2004–2005	Danubio	23	(4)
2005–2008	Groningen	67	(2)
2008–2012	Ajax	21	(0)
2010	→ Internacional (loan)	11	(1)
2013–2017	Cerro Largo	76	(9)
Total		285	(20)

International career
2003–2009	Uruguay	17	(0)

Managerial career
- 2021: Atlético Tucumán (assistant)
- 2022: Sol de América (assistant)
- 2024: Cerro Largo
- 2025–2026: Tijuana (assistant)
- 2026–: Cerro Largo
- * Club domestic league appearances and goals

Bruno Ramón Silva Barone (born 29 March 1980) is a Uruguayan football manager and former player who played as a right back. He is the current manager of Cerro Largo.

During his career, he played for Danubio in Uruguay, FC Rostov in Russia, Groningen and Ajax in the Netherlands, as well as Internacional in Brazil, with whom he won the 2010 Copa Libertadores. A severe shoulder injury forced Silva into early retirement.

== Club career ==
=== Early years ===
Silva began playing first-team football for Danubio in Montevideo, Uruguay at the start of the 2000 season. He remained with the club until 2003, then was transferred to FC Rostov to play in the Russian Premier League. He would make only four league appearances for the Russian side before returning to Danubio in his native Uruguay after the season ended. In the second half of the 2004 season, Silva played nine games in which he scored once. In 2005, he made fourteen appearances, in which he scored three goals. In total, Silva's return lasted a season and a half.

=== Groningen ===
Silva left for Europe again ahead of the 2005–06 season to sign a one-year contract with Dutch Eredivisie club Groningen. An emerging right full-back, he made a good impression with the Pride of the North, which resulted in his contract being extended. In the 2006–07 season, Silva became a key player for the club. In the following season, Silva was again an important starter. During the winter transfer period of that season, there were several clubs that showed interest in the Uruguayan. Silva played 68 games in which he scored twice, as Groningen were in third place when he left in January 2008.

=== Ajax ===
==== First spell ====
In January 2008, Ajax showed interest in Silva. As a result, Silva decided to go on strike in order to force a transfer. Eventually, he succeeded and moved to Ajax on 22 January 2008. This caused anger with the Groningen supporters. Groningen-teammates Rasmus Lindgren and Silva's fellow countryman Luis Suárez also leaving Groningen for Ajax added insult to injury. The first time Silva played an away game against Groningen with Ajax, burning toilet paper was thrown at the pitch, and the game was suspended due to fire on the stands. In the second half of the 2007–08 season, Silva made twelve appearances for Ajax.

The following season – 2008–09 – was a difficult season for Silva, as he was surpassed in the starting lineup by the emerging talent Gregory van der Wiel, which meant that he lost his starting job and was often not even part of the matchday squad. In the end, he would still play nine games and score once. In January 2009, both Palermo and Roma showed interest in acquiring Silva from Ajax. However, Ajax did not respond to this, because they at the time had too few defenders in the squad. During the first half of the 2009–10 season, Silva no longer made an impact on the pitch for Ajax.

==== Internacional (loan) ====
In December 2009, Brazilian club Internacional signed Silva on a one-year loan deal effective for the 2010 season. The loan was a success, with Silva helping the club win its second South American Copa Libertadores – Silva's first international club accolade of his career. He made 15 appearances for the club, in which he scored one goal before returning to Ajax.

==== Return ====
Silva's loan ended on 31 December 2010. On 4 January 2011, he returned to the training pitch at Ajax, together with Argentine striker Darío Cvitanich, who had also been on loan during the 2010 season. Silva played in Ajax's winter friendlies under new head coach Frank de Boer, but on 11 January, he was injured during a training session and broke his collarbone. Because of this, Silva had to undergo surgery on his shoulder. On 3 February 2011, it was announced that Silva would be sidelined for about four months and therefore had to miss the rest of the season. However, something went wrong during surgery, and he suffered a life-threatening infection. He was sidelined for the entire 2011–12 season. On 31 March 2012, it was announced that Ajax would enter into talks with Silva about his expiring contract and rehabilitation.

=== Cerro Largo ===
After a long rehabilitation with multiple surgeries, Silva made his return in March 2013 as a player of Cerro Largo from his hometown. In 2014, he became team captain of the club, which suffered relegation from the Primera División to Segunda División that year. He retired after the 2017 season.

== International career ==
On 4 February 2003, Silva made his debut for the Uruguay national team as part of the starting eleven in the Carlsberg Cup in the game against Iran under national coach Gustavo Ferrín. He was also called up for the national side under coach Juan Ramón Carrasco, the successor to Ferrín. After his fourth international on 15 August 2003, in which he led the Celeste as team captain to a 5–2 victory in the final of the LG Peace Cup against the Iraqi national team, Silva was not called up for a longer period. After a game against Turkey on 25 May 2008, he became a regular member of the national team again. He received his last call-up on 9 September 2009 in a 3–1 home win in the 2010 FIFA World Cup qualification against Colombia. He gained a total of 17 international caps in which he did not manage to score.

== Coaching career ==
After retiring, Silva worked as an assistant of former Internacional teammate Pablo Guiñazú at Atlético Tucumán and Sol de América. On 15 December 2023, he was named manager of Cerro Largo for the upcoming season. He resigned from the club on 3 July 2024.

== Career statistics ==
As of 24 October 2011

Club performance			League		Cup		Continental		Total	
Season	Club	League	Apps	Goals	Apps	Goals	Apps	Goals	Apps	Goals
Uruguay			League		Cup		South America		Total	
2003	Danubio	Primera División	39	2	-	-	-	-	39	2
2004	Danubio	Primera División	9	1	-	-	-	-	9	1
Russia			League		Russian Cup		Europe		Total	
2004	FC Rostov	Premier League	4	0	-	-	-	-	4	0
Uruguay			League		Cup		South America		Total	
2005–06	Danubio	Primera División	14	3	-	-	-	-	14	3
Netherlands			League		KNVB Cup		Europe		Total	
2005–06	FC Groningen	Eredivisie	21	1	-	-	-	-	21	1
2006–07	FC Groningen	Eredivisie	29	0	-	-	-	-	29	0
2007–08	FC Groningen	Eredivisie	18	1	-	-	-	-	18	1
2007–08	AFC Ajax	Eredivisie	12	0	-	-	-	-	12	0
2008–09	AFC Ajax	Eredivisie	8	0	-	-	-	-	8	0
2009–10	AFC Ajax	Eredivisie	0	0	-	-	-	-	0	0
Brazil			League		Copa do Brasil		South America		Total	
2010	Internacional (loan)	Série A	2	0	9	1	2	0	13	1
Netherlands			League		KNVB Cup		Europe		Total	
2010–11	AFC Ajax	Eredivisie	-	-	-	-	-	-	-	-
2011–12	AFC Ajax	Eredivisie	-	-	-	-	-	-	-	-
Total	Uruguay		62	6	-	-	-	-	62	6
Total	Brazil		2	0	9	1	2	0	13	1
Total	Russia		4	0	-	-	-	-	4	0
Total	Netherlands		88	2	-	-	-	-	88	2
Career total			156	8	9	1	2	0	167	9

== Honours ==
=== Club ===
Ajax

- Eredivisie: 2010–11, 2011–12
- KNVB Cup: 2009–10

Internacional

- Copa Libertadores: 2010
