= Laurent Delorge =

Belgian footballer

Personal information
- Full name: Laurent Delorge
- Date of birth: 21 July 1979 (age 47)
- Place of birth: Leuven, Belgium
- Height: 1.79 m (5 ft 10 1/2 in)
- Positions: Full back; midfielder

Youth career
- 1986–1987: FC Maleizen
- 1987–1991: Tempo Overijse
- 1991–1996: Racing Jet Wavre

Senior career*
Years	Team	Apps	(Gls)
1996–1998	Racing Jet Wavre	45	(12)
1998	AA Gent	10	(5)
1999–2002	Coventry City	30	(4)
2002–2005	Lierse SK	67	(11)
2005–2006	RSC Anderlecht	12	(0)
2006–2007	ADO Den Haag	28	(5)
2007–2009	Ajax	5	(1)
2009–2013	Roda JC Kerkrade	99	(7)

International career^{‡}
	Belgium U-21	2	(0)
- * Club domestic league appearances and goals as of 25 May 2013 ‡ National team caps and goals as of 6 January 2009

Laurent Delorge (born 21 July 1979) is a Belgian former footballer. He formerly served AA Gent, Coventry City, Lierse SK, RSC Anderlecht, ADO Den Haag, Ajax and Roda JC Kerkrade.

== Career ==
After scoring five goals in ten appearances in his Jupiler League debut season for AA Gent he was transferred to Coventry City who at the time were playing in the FA Premier League.

Delorge signed for Coventry midway through the 1998/99 season, however he didn't make his first appearance for the club until 29 January 2000, when he came on as a substitute in Coventry's defeat to Charlton Athletic in the FA Cup. His next appearance didn't come until 15 September 2001. However, in this game he made an instant impact; coming off the bench to score the winner against Sheffield United with practically his first touch of the game. He fell out with manager Gordon Strachan but was recalled when Roland Nilsson took over. He ultimately failed in his bid to become a first team regular but in 2001/02 he made 28 starts, scoring 4 goals.

When Lierse SK offered him a contract to return to the Jupiler League in his home country he ended his foreign career straight away and soon became one of their key players. Eventually this led to a transfer to RSC Anderlecht for the 2005/06 season.

At Anderlecht he was fired on 17 February 2006 for alleged 'wrongdoing' with former club Lierse SK in conjunction with the match-fixing investigation in Belgian football. Not much later he signed a 3-year contract deal with Dutch Eredivisie side ADO Den Haag. In a disappointing season ADO was unable to remain in the Eredivisie and were relegated to the Eerste Divisie. Delorge however was offered a contract at Ajax and signed a 2-year contract on 10 May 2007.

In his first year in Amsterdam he played four matches, but in his second year he did not play once. In the winter of 2009, Roda JC contracted the disappointed Delorge, who became a first team regular at the Eredivisie club before his retirement in July 2013.

== Statistics ==
Season	Club	Competition	Apps	Goals
1998/99	AA Gent	Jupiler League	10	5
1998/99	Coventry City	FA Premier League	0	0
1999/00	Coventry City	FA Premier League	0	0
2000/01	Coventry City	FA Premier League	0	0
2001/02	Coventry City	Championship	28	4
2002/03	Coventry City	Championship	2	0
2002/03	Lierse SK	Jupiler League	10	2
2003/04	Lierse SK	Jupiler League	30	4
2004/05	Lierse SK	Jupiler League	27	5
2005/06	RSC Anderlecht	Jupiler League	12	0
2006/07	ADO Den Haag	Eredivisie	28	5
2007/08	Ajax	Eredivisie	1	0
2008/09	Ajax	Eredivisie	4	1
	Roda JC	Eredivisie	15	1
2009/10	Roda JC	Eredivisie	24	0
2010/11	Roda JC Kerkrade	Eredivisie	25	4
2011/12	Roda JC Kerkrade	Eredivisie	20	1
2012/13	Roda JC Kerkrade	Eredivisie	15	1
Total			250	33
