= Kenneth Perez =

Danish footballer (born 1974)

Kenneth Pérez
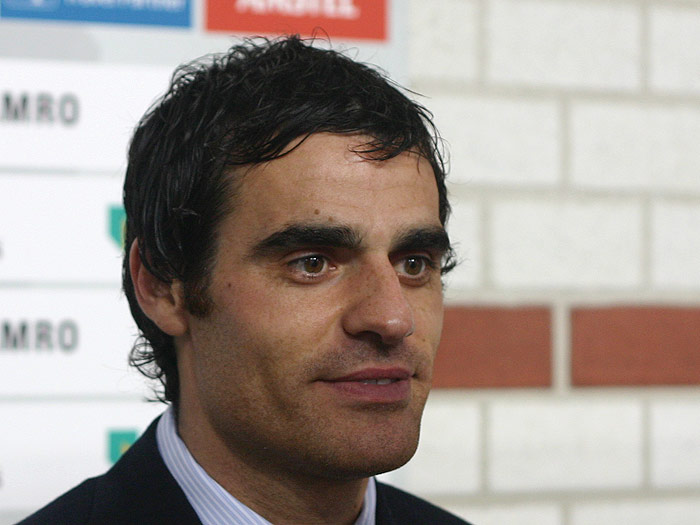

Personal information
- Full name: Kenneth Pérez Dahl Jensen
- Date of birth: 29 August 1974 (age 52)
- Place of birth: Copenhagen, Denmark
- Height: 1.82 m (6 ft 0 in)
- Position: Winger

Senior career*
Years	Team	Apps	(Gls)
1992–1993	Kastrup Boldklub		
1993–1995	Akademisk Boldklub	36	(7)
1995–1997	Copenhagen	30	(3)
1997–2000	MVV Maastricht	47	(16)
2000–2006	AZ	164	(51)
2006–2007	Ajax	27	(12)
2007–2008	PSV	14	(8)
2008	Ajax	16	(7)
2008–2010	Twente	57	(11)
Total		405	(124)

International career
2003–2008	Denmark	24	(2)

Managerial career
- 2011–2014: Ajax (youth)
- * Club domestic league appearances and goals

Kenneth Pérez Dahl Jensen (born 29 August 1974) is a Danish former professional footballer who played as a winger. Perez scored two goals in 24 matches for the Denmark national team from 2003 to 2008, and he was chosen to compete at the 2004 European Championship.

He appears regularly on Dutch television as a pundit for Fox Sports Eredivisie.

== Personal life ==
Kenneth Perez was born on 29 August 1974 in Copenhagen, Denmark, as Kenneth Perez Dahl Jensen. He is married to Britt Perez. They have two sons.

In 1997 his girlfriend Britt moved with him from Denmark to the Netherlands, and a few years later, they married.

Perez's mother is from Las Palmas de Gran Canaria.

== Career ==
Perez started his career for Danish club Akademisk Boldklub, where he reached the 1995 Danish Cup final. The final was lost to F.C. Copenhagen, with whom Perez signed a two-year contract in autumn that year. He played two years for F.C. Copenhagen, and Perez was a part of the team which won the 1997 Danish Cup. With months left of his contract, he moved abroad in August 1997, to play for Dutch Eredivisie side MVV Maastricht. Perez scored goals frequently for MVV, and his dribbling ability was regarded as one of the best in the Eredivisie. With his contract nearing expiry, he looked to leave the club in winter 1999. Dutch clubs Roda JC and AZ wanted to buy Perez, and he eventually penned a 5 1/2-year contract with AZ starting from January 2000.

He made his debut for the Denmark national team under manager Morten Olsen in November 2003. He came on as a substitute to replace Dennis Rommedahl in the 3–2 victory against England. He was selected to represent Denmark at the 2004 European Championship, where he took part in one match, coming on as a substitute.

Often playing on the left winger, Perez was the most technical of AZ's prolific strike force during the 2004–05 season. He was AZ's top goal scorer in that season, as he fired 13 goals past opposition goalkeepers, and was the joint 9th best league goal scorer. The club finished in third place that season, and ended second in the 2005–06 season. After six-and-a-half years at AZ, Perez transferred to rival Eredivisie side Ajax in the summer 2006. He subsequently ended his national team career to focus on playing for Ajax. Since his debut in November 2003, Perez played 19 national team matches, though he was either substituted on or off the pitch, and never played a full national team match.

He won the Dutch Super Cup trophy with Ajax, beating PSV 3–1 in August 2006. In December 2006, Perez admitted having used a racial slur against an assistant referee. He publicly apologized to the assistant referee and received a five-match ban and a €12,500 fine.

In July 2007, Perez signed with Ajax rivals PSV on a two-year deal.

On 31 December 2007, it was announced Perez would make a shock return to Ajax with immediate effect. He signed a one-and-a-half-year deal with an option for another season.

Pressed for an explanation, Jan Reker, the technical director of PSV, responded on 1 January 2008. Reker observed that Perez had requested a transfer back to Amsterdam only after Ajax had failed to lure Ismail Aissati to Amsterdam. According to Reker, Perez cited two reasons for the request: the commute from his home in North Holland to Eindhoven on a daily basis was a burden; and, once PSV coach Ronald Koeman left, interim coach Jan Wouters had limited his playing time.

Perez and Martin van Geel, the technical director of Ajax, subsequently disputed Reker's account. Perez stated that PSV had initiated the transfer by telling Perez, just four months after his arrival from Ajax, that he no longer had a future at the club; and that Ajax, on the other hand, was still looking for a replacement for star midfield player Wesley Sneijder, who had been sold to Real Madrid. Then, with the departure of Henk Ten Cate to Chelsea in September, Perez had a path back to Amsterdam. Van Geel added that Ajax had only wanted to buy Aissati the previous summer and that the failure to acquire Assaiti was not a factor in Perez's transfer.

Perez was relegated to the Ajax reserves in the summer of 2008 by new Ajax head coach Marco van Basten He was released at the end of August. and later on July was transferred to Steve McClaren's FC Twente.

In January 2010, Perez marked himself as the player with the second most assists and goals in Dutch football through the past decade. The only player above him was Dirk Kuyt. On 2 May 2010, Perez won his first Eredivisie title, coincidentally also the first title of his club FC Twente, at the age of 35 years. It was his last match in a FC Twente jersey.

== Career statistics ==
Appearances and goals by club, season and competition
Club	Season	League		
Club	Season	Division	Apps	Goals
Copenhagen	1995–96	Danish Superliga	7	0
Copenhagen	1996–97	Danish Superliga	22	3
Copenhagen	Total		29	3
MVV Maastricht	1997–98	Eredivisie	12	2
MVV Maastricht	1998–99	Eredivisie	22	8
MVV Maastricht	1999–00	Eredivisie	13	6
MVV Maastricht	Total		47	16
AZ Alkmaar	1999–00	Eredivisie	7	1
AZ Alkmaar	2000–01	Eredivisie	7	0
AZ Alkmaar	2001–02	Eredivisie	28	6
AZ Alkmaar	2002–03	Eredivisie	29	11
AZ Alkmaar	2003–04	Eredivisie	32	10
AZ Alkmaar	2004–05	Eredivisie	30	13
AZ Alkmaar	2005–06	Eredivisie	31	10
AZ Alkmaar	Total		164	51
Ajax	2006–07	Eredivisie	27	12
PSV	2007–08	Eredivisie	14	8
Ajax	2007–08	Eredivisie	16	7
Twente	2008–09	Eredivisie	26	6
Twente	2009–10	Eredivisie	31	5
Twente	Total		57	11
Career total			354	108

== Honours ==
Copenhagen

- Danish Cup: 1996–97

Ajax

- Johan Cruijff Schaal: 2006

Twente

- Eredivisie: 2009–10
