= Leonardo (footballer, born 1983) =

Brazilian footballer

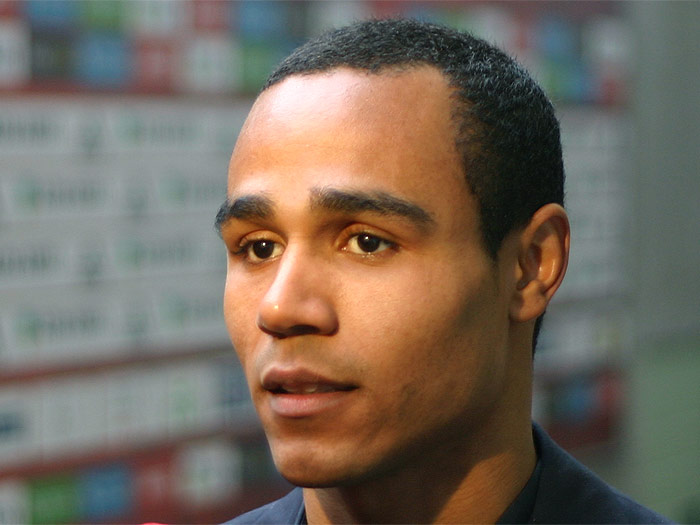
- Leonardo

Personal information
- Full name: Leonardo de Vitor Santiago
- Date of birth: 9 March 1983 (age 43)
- Place of birth: Rio de Janeiro, Brazil
- Height: 1.73 m (5 ft 8 in)
- Position: Winger

Youth career
- Nova Safra
- 1995–2000: Feyenoord

Senior career*
Years	Team	Apps	(Gls)
2000–2005	Feyenoord	53	(4)
2006	NAC Breda	31	(10)
2007–2009	Ajax	39	(5)
2009–2012	NAC Breda	42	(6)
2011–2012	→ Red Bull Salzburg (loan)	30	(4)
2013–2014	Ferencváros	23	(7)
2014	1860 Munich	8	(2)
2015–2016	Newcastle United Jets	20	(1)
2017	FC Eindhoven	8	(1)
Total		254	(40)
- * Club domestic league appearances and goals

Leonardo Vitor Santiago (born 9 March 1983), commonly known as Leonardo, is a Brazilian former professional footballer who played as a winger or playmaker. Leonardo is a former U-20 Brazilian international.

== Career ==
=== Nova Safra ===
Leonardo started at the Nova Safra football school in Rio de Janeiro and was raised in the Jacarezinho neighbourhood, which is also the area where Romário spent his early years. In 1994, at the age of 11 Leonardo's football talent was discovered by Jos de Putter who directed the documentary "Solo, de wet van de favela" about him and another young player, Anselmo, from the slums of Rio de Janeiro. The documentary focuses on how football plays a significant role in getting young people out of the hopeless living conditions that many young inhabitants of the slums live every day.

=== Feyenoord ===
Following the attention the film brought Leonardo, he moved to Rotterdam to play in Feyenoord's youth academy setup at Varkenoord. Leonardo made his debut for Feyenoord on 19 August 2000 in a 2–0 victory over AZ Alkmaar at the age of 17. Leonardo's debut sparked controversy for himself and Feyenoord as FIFA regulations for the status of players under article 19 dictate "international transfers of players are only permitted if the player is over the age of 18" when it comes to non European Union (EU) players. It turned out Leonardo had been misinformed and misrepresented which resulted in a forged Portuguese passport being handed to Leonardo that made Feyenoord believe they could play Leonardo when he was only 17.

Leonardo had to wait until he turned 18 to play in Feyenoord's first team again. He scored his first goal in the match versus SC Heerenveen, which ended in 2–0. His second goal he scored in the away win against arch rivals Ajax.

In his first two seasons at Feyenoord he played 44 matches and scored four goals. He was part of the Feyenoord squad that won the 2001–02 UEFA Cup, playing as a substitute in the final.

=== NAC Breda (first stint) ===
He joined NAC Breda in January 2006 on a 1.5-year deal. He helped NAC Breda to stay in the Eredivisie by scoring 8 goals in 14 matches in the regular season, which made him top goal scorer at the club.

=== Ajax ===
In December 2006 Leonardo agreed with Ajax on a new 2.5-year contract. On 21 January 2007, he played his first Ajax Eredivisie game against FC Utrecht Six weeks later in the game against SC Heerenveen he suffered a heavy injury tearing the anterior cruciate ligament in his right knee, which sidelined him for at least six months.

=== NAC Breda (second stint) ===
2011 he went from NAC Breda to FC Red Bull Salzburg on loan.

=== Ferencváros ===
In February 2013 Leonardo signed a contract with Hungarian top club Ferencváros.

=== 1860 Munich ===
In July 2014 Leonardo was contracted by German 2. Bundesliga club 1860 Munich. While he regularly played at the start of the 2014–15 season under coach Ricardo Moniz and managed to score twice, he was dropped from the squad after Markus von Ahlen took over the coaching position in September. His contract was terminated on his own wish in the end of November 2014.

=== Newcastle United Jets ===
21 August 2015, Leonardo signed for A-League club Newcastle United Jets FC in Australia for the 2015–16 A-League season. 12 September 2015, Leonardo made his debut for the Jets in the 0–0 pre-season draw with the Brisbane Roar at Redland City. Leonardo came on as a second-half substitute with thirty minutes to go in the match for youngster Mitch Cooper in the number ten role. Leonardo made his A-League debut in the opening round match between the Jets and Wellington Phoenix at Westpac Stadium. Leonardo started and played most of the match, being substituted in the 81st minute for striker Labinot Haliti. Newcastle and Leonardo won the match 2–1.

=== FC Eindhoven ===
In March 2017 Leonardo joined FC Eindhoven after receiving a Dutch passport.

== Career statistics ==
Appearances and goals by club, season and competition
Club	Season	League		
Club	Season	Division	Apps	Goals
Feyenoord	2000–01	Eredivisie	23	2
Feyenoord	2001–02	Eredivisie	19	2
Feyenoord	2002–03	Eredivisie	3	0
Feyenoord	2003–04	Eredivisie	3	0
Feyenoord	2004–05	Eredivisie	4	0
Feyenoord	2005–06	Eredivisie	1	0
Feyenoord	Total		53	4
NAC Breda	2005–06	Eredivisie	14	8
NAC Breda	2006–07	Eredivisie	17	2
NAC Breda	Total		31	10
Ajax	2006–07	Eredivisie	7	1
Ajax	2007–08	Eredivisie	8	2
Ajax	2008–09	Eredivisie	24	2
Ajax	Total		39	5
NAC Breda	2009–10	Eredivisie	17	4
NAC Breda	2010–11	Eredivisie	25	2
NAC Breda	Total		42	6
Red Bull Salzburg (loan)	2011–12	Austrian Bundesliga	30	4
Ferencváros	2012–13	Nemzeti Bajnokság I	9	2
Ferencváros	2013–14	Nemzeti Bajnokság I	14	5
Ferencváros	Total		23	7
1860 Munich	2014–15	2. Bundesliga	8	2
Newcastle Jets	2015–16	A-League	20	1
FC Eindhoven	2016–17	Eerste Divisie	8	1
Career total			254	40

== Honours ==
Feyenoord

- UEFA Cup 2002

Ajax

- Dutch Cup 2007
- Dutch Super Cup 2007

Red Bull Salzburg

- Austrian Bundesliga 2011–12
- Austrian Cup: 2012

Ferencváros

- Hungarian League Cup: 2012–13
