= Dennis Gentenaar =

Dutch footballer (born 1975)

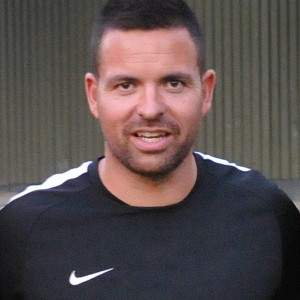

Personal information
- Date of birth: 30 September 1975 (age 51)
- Place of birth: Nijmegen, Netherlands
- Height: 1.80 m (5 ft 11 in)
- Position: Goalkeeper

Youth career
- ZOW
- NEC

Senior career*
Years	Team	Apps	(Gls)
1995–2005	NEC	170	(0)
2005–2006	Borussia Dortmund	10	(0)
2006–2009	Ajax	7	(0)
2009–2012	VVV-Venlo	50	(0)
2012–2013	Almere City	27	(0)
2013–2014	NEC	6	(0)
Total		270	(0)
- * Club domestic league appearances and goals

Dennis Gentenaar (Dutch pronunciation: [ˈdɛnɪs ˈxɛntənaːr]; born 30 September 1975) is a Dutch former professional footballer who played as a goalkeeper. Besides the Netherlands, he has played in Germany. After retiring, he became a goalkeeping coach.

== Playing career ==
Gentenaar was born in Nijmegen. Coming from the amateur side ZOW, he made his professional debut for NEC on 26 November 1995 aged 20, at home against PSV Eindhoven which NEC lost 5–0. Gentenaar made another appearance later that season, but had to wait until 1998 to make his second appearance in professional football. During that season he played seven matches, still as the second goalkeeper for NEC. From the 2000–01 season, things changed for Gentenaar and he became NEC's first goalkeeper. From then on he only missed nine appearances in five seasons; during the last three seasons he did not miss a single match.

He developed into a trustworthy goalkeeper and his performance earned him a transfer to Bundesliga side Borussia Dortmund. A year later he returned to the Eredivisie, to become second goalkeeper behind Maarten Stekelenburg at Ajax, at which time he won the 2007 KNVB Cup, his first career trophy. On 8 June 2009, he left Ajax and signed a two-year contract with VVV-Venlo. In 2012, he signed with Almere City FC for a two-year period. After a year in the First Division he returned to his former club NEC and signed a contract for one year. He ended his professional career in May 2014. After retiring, he played another season with amateur club SV Ouderkerk.

== Coaching career ==
Gentenaar was appointed goalkeeping coach at Israeli Premier League club Maccabi Tel Aviv in January 2021, assisting head coach Patrick van Leeuwen.

He was goalkeeping coach at Ukrainian side Shakhtar Donetsk before being sacked in late 2023 when van Leeuwen departed the club. As of March 2025, Gentenaar was goalkeeping coach at Ukrainian First League club Metalist 1925 Kharkiv.

== Personal life ==
Gentenaar was born in the Netherlands, and is of Indonesian descent through his father.

Gentenaar has a son named Dayen, who also plays as a goalkeeper.

== Career statistics ==
Appearances and goals by club, season and competition
Club	Season	League			Cup		Europe		Other		Total	
Club	Season	Division	Apps	Goals	Apps	Goals	Apps	Goals	Apps	Goals	Apps	Goals
NEC	1995–96	Eredivisie	2	0	1	0	—		1	0	4	0
NEC	1996–97	Eredivisie	0	0	0	0	—		0	0	0	0
NEC	1997–98	Eredivisie	0	0	0	0	—		—		0	0
NEC	1998–99	Eredivisie	7	0	0	0	—		—		7	0
NEC	1999–2000	Eredivisie	0	0	1	0	—		—		1	0
NEC	2000–01	Eredivisie	29	0	5	0	—		—		34	0
NEC	2001–02	Eredivisie	30	0	2	0	—		—		32	0
NEC	2002–03	Eredivisie	34	0	3	0	—		—		37	0
NEC	2003–04	Eredivisie	34	0	2	0	2	0	—		38	0
NEC	2004–05	Eredivisie	34	0	2	0	2	0	—		38	0
NEC	Total		170	0	16	0	4	0	1	0	191	0
Borussia Dortmund	2005–06	Bundesliga	10	0	0	0	0	0	—		10	0
Ajax	2006–07	Eredivisie	2	0	2	0	1	0	0	0	5	0
Ajax	2007–08	Eredivisie	5	0	1	0	1	0	0	0	7	0
Ajax	2008–09	Eredivisie	0	0	0	0	0	0	—		0	0
Ajax	Total		7	0	3	0	2	0	0	0	12	0
VVV-Venlo	2009–10	Eredivisie	2	0	0	0	—		—		2	0
VVV-Venlo	2010–11	Eredivisie	19	0	1	0	—		4	0	23	0
VVV-Venlo	2011–12	Eredivisie	24	0	0	0	—		4	0	28	0
VVV-Venlo	Total		45	0	1	0	—		8	0	54	0
Almere City	2012–13	Eerste Divisie	27	0	0	0	—		—		27	0
NEC	2013–14	Eredivisie	6	0	1	0	—		0	0	7	0
Total			270	0	21	0	6	0	9	0	306	0
