= Urby Emanuelson =

Dutch footballer (born 1986)

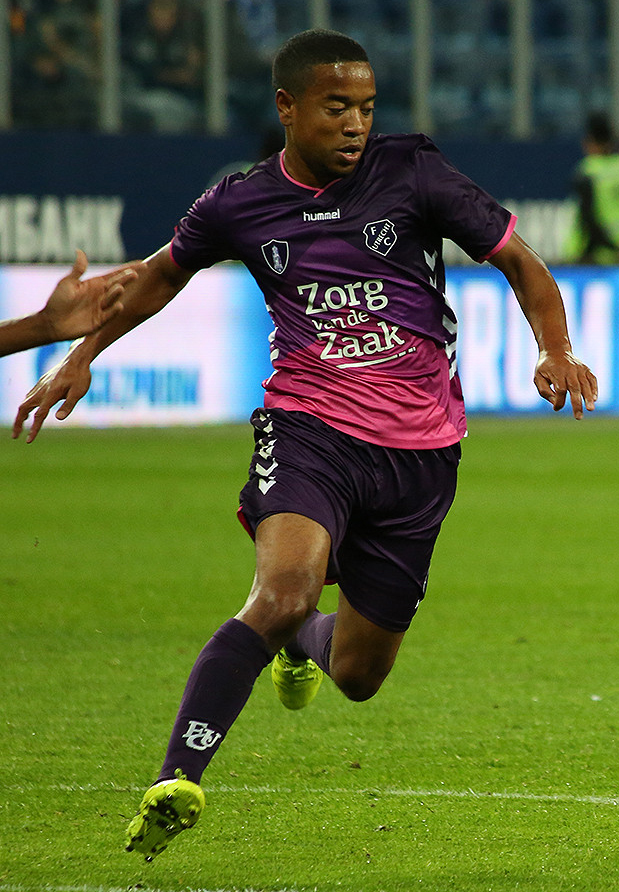
- Emanuelson with Utrecht in 2017

Personal information
- Full name: Urby Vitorrio Diego Emanuelson
- Date of birth: 16 June 1986 (age 40)
- Place of birth: Amsterdam, Netherlands
- Height: 1.76 m (5 ft 9 in)
- Positions: Left back; midfielder; winger

Team information
- Current team: Jong Ajax (assistant)

Youth career
- Voorland
- 1994–2004: Ajax

Senior career*
Years	Team	Apps	(Gls)
2004–2011	Ajax	172	(17)
2011–2014	AC Milan	75	(3)
2013	→ Fulham (loan)	13	(1)
2014–2015	Roma	2	(0)
2015	→ Atalanta (loan)	9	(0)
2016	Hellas Verona	11	(0)
2016–2017	Sheffield Wednesday	1	(0)
2017–2022	Utrecht	78	(4)
Total		361	(25)

International career
2005–2008	Netherlands U21	13	(1)
2006–2012	Netherlands	16	(0)

Managerial career
- 2022–2023: Utrecht (assistant)
- 2023–: Jong Ajax (assistant)
Medal record
Men's football
Representing Netherlands
UEFA European Under-21 Championship
Winner	2006
- * Club domestic league appearances and goals

Urby Vitorrio Diego Emanuelson (born 16 June 1986) is a Dutch former professional footballer. He is the currently assistant trainer of Jong Ajax.

As a product of the Ajax Youth Academy, Emanuelson spent most of his career at Ajax playing as a left wing-back, before being played more as a left midfielder or left winger by manager Martin Jol. As a result, he flourished in his new role on the left wing, frequently making runs and assisting from the flanks while scoring goals himself. After his move to AC Milan, his then-manager Massimiliano Allegri played Emanuelson also as an attacking midfielder, midfielder and right winger.

== Club career ==
=== Ajax ===
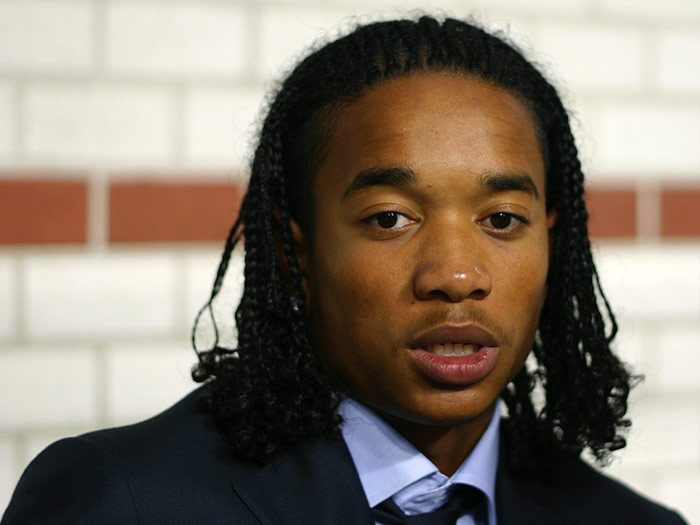
Emanuelson with Ajax in 2006

Emanuelson is a product of Ajax's youth system, joining them from Voorland SC. Having progressed through the club's youth system, he signed his first professional contract, keeping him until 2006. Having been called up to the first team on two occasions, on 24 February 2005 Emanuelson made his Ajax debut, coming on as a 79th-minute substitute, in a 3–1 loss against Auxerre in the second leg of the UEFA Cup Round of 32. He made his debut during the 2004–05 season on 10 April 2005, coming on as a 78th-minute substitute, in a 4–2 home win over AZ Alkmaar. Emanuelson later made three more appearances, adding up his tally to five at the end of the 2004–05 season.

Ahead of the 2005–06 season, Emanuelson was linked a move away from Ajax, as several clubs were interested in signing him on loan, but he ended up staying at the club. Emanuelson made his first appearance of the season, starting in the left–back position against PSV Eindhoven in the Johan Cruyff Shield and helped Ajax win 2–1, winning his first trophy in his career. Since the start of the 2005–06 season, he quickly became first-choice left back and impressed in a number of matches for the club. At times, Emanuelson rotated in playing in the left–midfield position. He then helped Ajax beat Brøndby in both legs, as the club won 5–3 on aggregate. This lasted until Emanuelson was sidelined with an injury that saw him miss four matches for Ajax. On 27 December 2005 he returned to the first team, coming on as a 73rd-minute substitute, in a 3–2 win against FC Groningen. Since returning from the sidelines, Emanuelson appeared in the next eleven matches for the club, mostly playing in the left–back position and rotated in the midfield position on two occasions. On 22 January 2006 he came on as an 82nd-minute substitute and scored his first Ajax goal, which turned out to be the winning goal, in a 3–2 win. Two weeks later on 2 February 2006, Emanuelson scored his second goal for the club, in a 3–0 win against SC Heerenveen in the quarter–finals of the KNVB Beker. By March, however, he suffered a muscle injury that expected him to be sidelined for the rest of the 2005–06 season. Following a transfer speculation reporting that Palermo wanted sign to Emanuelson, he signed a contract extension with Ajax, keeping him until 2011, ending the transfer speculation. On 16 April 2006 Emanuelson returned to the starting line–up in the last game of the season, in a 4–2 win against RKC Waalwijk. He played four times in the newly born Eredivisie play-offs after finishing in the fifth position in the regular competition. In the play-offs, they defeated Feyenoord but lost to FC Groningen in the club's unsuccessful attempt to claim a spot in the Champions League preliminaries for the following season. In the final of the KNVB Cup against PSV Eindhoven, he started in the left–back position with Ajax and helped the side win 2–1. As a result, his efforts resulted in him being named "Amsterdam talent of the year 2006" alongside Thomas Vermaelen. At the end of the 2005–06 season, Emanuelson made forty–one appearances and scoring two times in all competitions.

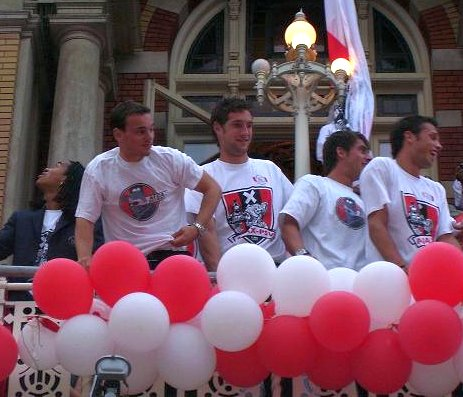
Emanuelson (far left, with Wesley Sneijder, Maarten Stekelenburg, Zdeněk Grygera, and John Heitinga) played for Ajax from 2004 to 2011.

At the start of the 2006–07 season, Emanuelson played the whole game, as Ajax beat PSV Eindhoven 3–1 to win the Johan Cruyff Shield. He quickly regained his first team place, rotating in the left–back position and midfield positions. However, Emanuelson played in both legs of the third round of the UEFA Champions League against Copenhagen, as the club were eliminated following a 4–1 defeat on aggregate. On 14 October 2006 he scored his first goal for Ajax, in a 3–2 win against FC Groningen. This was followed up by helping the club keeping three out of the four consecutive clean sheets, in which Emanuelson played in the left–back position. In a match against Sparta Prague, Emanuelson was sent–off for a second bookable offence, as they drew 0–0. Despite this, he then scored his second goal of the season, in a 6–0 win against Willem II on 3 December 2006. By the end of the year, Emanuelson was nominated for the Golden Boy, but won the 2006's Amsterdam Talent award. He continued to start in the first team until a knee injury sustained during a 4–1 win against Feyenoord on 4 February 2007 saw him sidelined for a month. On 4 March 2007 Emanuelson made a return to the starting line–up, in a 1–0 loss against SC Heerenveen. This was followed up by setting up two goals, in a 4–1 win against FC Twente. In the last game of the season against Willem II, Emanuelson scored his third goal of the season, in a 2–0 win. Once again, he played four times in the newly born Eredivisie play-offs after finishing in the second position in the regular competition. In the play-offs, they defeated Heerenveen and AZ Alkmaar to claim a spot in the Champions League preliminaries for the following season. Emanuelson was featured in the KNVB Cup Final against AZ, playing 120 minutes and finishing 1–1 as Ajax went on to lose 8–7 as a result and win the tournament for the second time in a row. At the end of the 2006–07 season, he went on to make forty–six appearances and scoring three times in all competitions.

At the start of the 2007–08 season, Emanuelson played the whole game, as Ajax beat PSV Eindhoven 1–0 to win the Johan Cruyff Shield with the former won for the third consecutive year. However, he played in four European matches that saw the club eliminated by Slavia Prague and Dinamo Zagreb in the UEFA Champions League and UEFA Cup. Despite this, Emanuelson continued to regain his first team place, playing in the left–back position, though he stated in an interview of his disappointment over lack of cover in the left–back position. This lasted until Emanuelson suffered a knee injury that kept him out for two weeks. On 11 November 2007 he returned to the starting line–up, playing in the centre–midfield position, in a 2–2 draw against Feyenoord. Following his return from injury, Emanuelson continued to regain his first team place, playing in the left–back position. In a match against FC Utrecht on 23 January 2008, he suffered a knee injury that saw him substituted in the 74th minute. Although Manager Adrie Koster confirmed that Emanuelson suffered a bruise of a knee injury, his injury turned out to be not too bad as first thought. In a follow–up match against Vitesse, he scored his first goal of the season, in a 2–2 draw. By February, Emanuelson began primarily played as a left midfielder because of his weak defending abilities and Jan Vertonghen took over the position. The player, himself, publicity said he does not want to return to the left–back position. Emanuelson then scored two goals in two matches between 24 February 2008 and 2 March 2008 against NAC Breda and SBV Excelsior. However, he eventually played in the left–back position against SC Heerenveen in play–offs for the UEFA Champions League spot, as Ajax won 5–2 on aggregate. In a follow–up match against Twente, Emanuelson suffered ankle injury that saw him substituted in the 66th minute, as the club lost 2–1. As a result, Ajax lost their chance to qualify for the UEFA Champions League following a 0–0 draw in the return leg. At the end of the 2007–08 season, he went on to make forty–one appearances and scoring three times in all competitions.

At the start of the 2008–09 season, Emanuelson started in the first three matches, playing once in the centre–midfield position and twice in the left–back position before missing two matches due to illness. He returned to the starting line–up against SC Heerenveen on 5 October 2008, and played the whole game, as Ajax lost 5–2. Emanuelson then contributed five assists for the club by the end of the year. On 21 December 2008 he scored his first goal of the season, in a 6–0 win against De Graafschap. By November, Emanuelson began playing in different midfield positions for Ajax. But at one point, he did play in the left–back position against NEC Nijmegen on 18 January 2009, as the club won 4–2. His second goal of the season came on 15 February 2009, in a 2–0 win against rival, Feyenoord. After missing one match due to a stiff neck Emanuelson sustained during a UEFA Cup third round first leg against Fiorentina and set up the only goal of the game in a 1–0 win, he returned to the starting line–up in the return leg against them and helped the side go through to the next round following a 1–1 draw. By March, Emanuelson then publicly criticised Manager Marco van Basten for his substitution policy after he was substituted five times in the last eight league matches. Emanuelson then scored his third goal of the season, in a 7–0 win against Willem II on 12 April 2009. During a 6–2 loss against PSV Eindhoven in a follow–up, he suffered a suspected ankle injury that saw him substituted in the 38th minute. But Emanuelson was given all clear after the medical team said his injury was not bad as first thought. Despite suffering another injury later in the 2008–09 season, he continued to remain involve in the last remaining matches and scored his fifth goal of the season, in a 1–0 win against FC Twente in the last game of the season. Following this, Emanuelson went on to make forty–two appearances and scoring four times in all competitions.

Ahead of the 2009–10 season, Emanuelson was linked with a move to Bayern Munich to link up with Manager Louis van Gaal but he made it clear that he wanted to stay at Ajax. At the start of the 2009–10 season, Emanuelson continued to regain his first team place, playing in different midfield positions. Having publicly refused to play in the left–back position prior to the start of the season, he eventually played in the position following the fitness of Timothée Atouba. On 16 August 2009 Emanuelson scored his first goal of the season, in a 4–3 loss against PSV Eindhoven. He played in both legs of the UEFA Europa League Play-off round against Slovan Bratislava, as the club won 7–1 on aggregate. However, Emanuelson received a straight red card in the 81st minute for a tackle, in a 2–2 draw against Roda JC on 4 October 2009. After serving a one match suspension, he returned to the starting line–up against AZ Alkmaar on 25 October 2009 and scored his second goal of the season, in a 4–2 win. This was followed by scoring twice against FC Dordrecht and once against Feyenoord. His sixth goal of the season came on 17 December 2009 in the UEFA Europa League match against Anderlecht, as Ajax lost 3–1. On 4 January 2010, his contract talks with the club was broken down. Emanuelson said it would have been a disappointment to leave the club on a free transfer just two months prior to the contract broken down. Amid to the contract, he later scored two more goals later in the 2009–10 season against PSV Eindhoven and VVV-Venlo. In the last game of the season against NEC Nijmegen, Emanuelson set up two goals, as Ajax won 4–1 to finish second place after finishing behind FC Twente, who won the league title. He started in the 2009–10 Dutch Cup final against rivals, Feyenoord, and set up the second goal of the game for Siem de Jong, who scored twice to help the club to make it 2–0 in the first leg. In the return leg, Emanuelson helped Ajax beat Feyenoord, 4–1, winning the KNVB Cup for the third time in his career. Shortly after the end of the match, Emanuelson made it clear to reporters that he wanted to stay at the club following reports of him being linked to PSV Eindhoven. Despite being absent on two more occasions later in the 2009–10 season, Emanuelson went on to make forty–eight appearances and scoring eight times in all competitions, a target he successfully predicted.

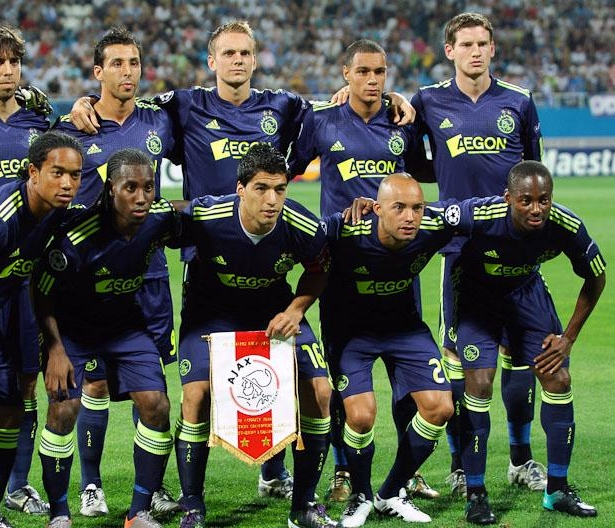
Emanuelson (first from top left) with Ajax teammates in 2010

Emanuelson made his first appearance of the 2010–11 season, starting the whole game, as Ajax lost 1–0 against Twente in the Johan Cruyff Shield. He then helped the club reach the Group-Stage of the Champions League after beating PAOK Salonika and Dynamo Kiev. Shortly after, Emanuelson scored his first goal of the season, in a 5–0 win against De Graafschap. His second goal of the season came on 22 September 2010, in a 5–0 win against MVV Maastricht. Since the start of the 2010–11 season, he continued to regain his first team place, rotating in the left–back position and different midfield positions. As a result, the club began a contract negotiation with Emanuelson over a new contract, though he later stated his guarantee of not staying at the club. However, it was announced on 3 November 2010 that Emanuelson would leave Ajax at the end of the 2010–11 season. He later confirmed the news two days later. Despite announcing his departure and facing his own injury concern along the way, he remain involved in the club's first team until his departure in January. Emanuelson made thirty–two appearances and scoring two times in all competitions.

=== AC Milan ===
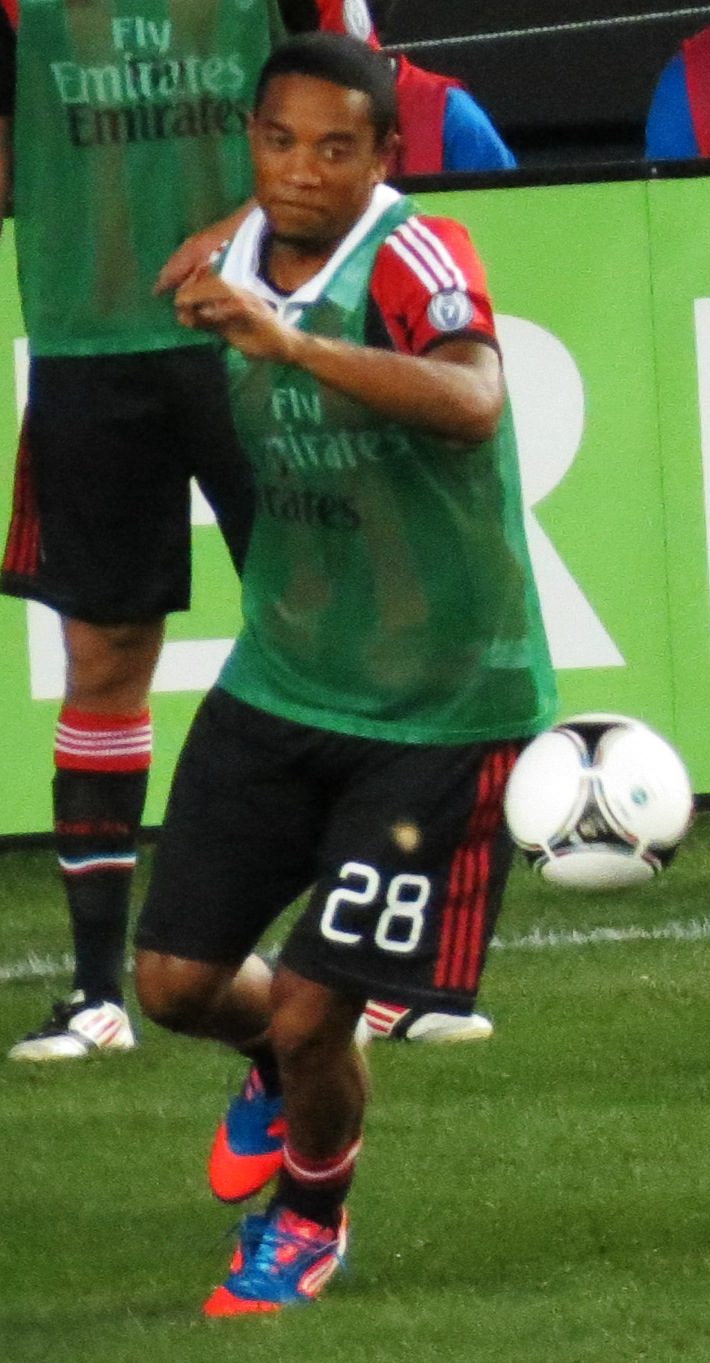
Emanuelson warming up with AC Milan in August 2012

On 23 January 2011, Italian Serie A club AC Milan announced the signing of Emanuelson on a three-and-a-half-year contract for a transfer fee of around €1.7 million. After the 2010–11 season, the fee increased by €750,000, making a total fee of around €2.5 million.

Emanuelson made his debut for the club on 26 January 2011 in a Coppa Italia match against Sampdoria, providing an assist for Alexandre Pato. Milan won the match 2–1. He played his first game in Serie A after entering as a substitute against Catania. However, Emanuelson found himself in and out of the starting line–up, as his mostly playing time came from the substitute bench. Emanuelson scored his first goal for Milan in a Coppa Italia match against Palermo, the equaliser in a 2–2 draw. He helped Milan win their first Scudetto in seven years at the end of the season, acting mostly as a substitute. Emanuelson went on to make eleven appearances and scoring once in all competitions.

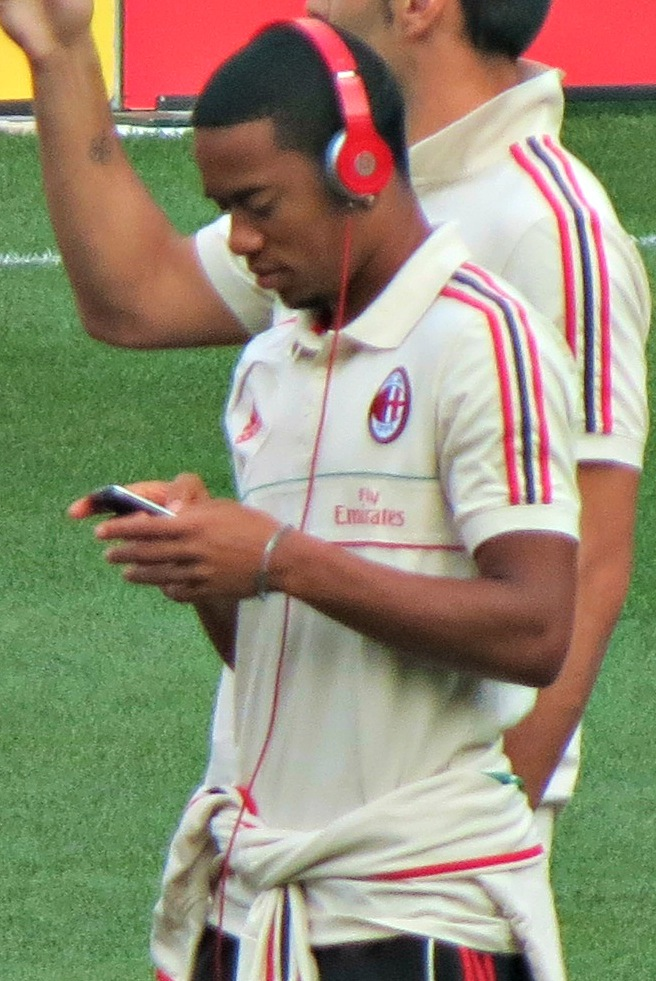
Emanuelson listening to music, as he was about to warm up in August 2012

At the start of the 2011–12 season, Emanuelson played eight minutes after coming on as a substitute, against Inter Milan and helped AC Milan win the 2011 Supercoppa Italiana by beating them 2–1. Since then, he continued to become a first team regular for the club, playing in different midfield positions. Emanuelson then set up AC Milan's only goal of the game, in a 1–0 win against Cesena on 24 September 2011. He then helped AC Milan qualify for the UEFA Champions League knockout stage after drawing 2–2 against Viktoria Plzeň. Emanuelson then played in both legs against Arsenal and helped the club qualify for the next round by winning 4–3 on aggregate. He then scored his first Serie A goal for Milan in an away match against Cesena on 19 February 2012. He scored his second Serie A goal for Milan in an away game against Parma on 17 March 2012. Emanuelson started in every match until he suffered an injury that saw him sidelined for the rest of the 2011–12 season. In his first season at the club, Emanuelson made forty–two appearances and scoring two times in all competitions.

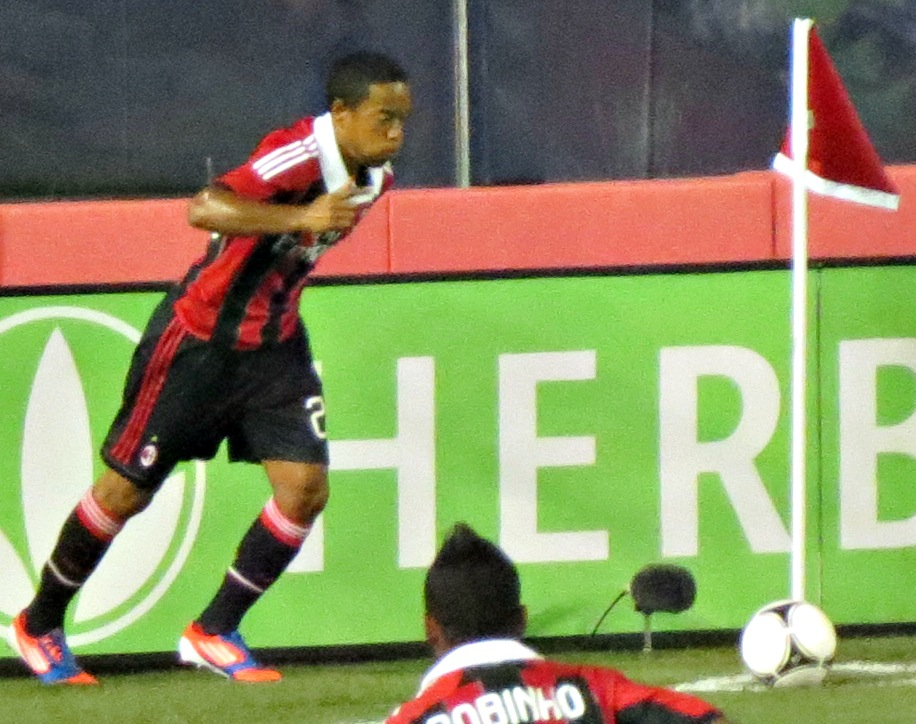
Emanuelson about to take a corner kick during a match in 2012

At the start of the 2012–13 season, Emanuelson continued to be involved in the first team for AC Milan, alternating between a starting and substitute role. On 3 October 2012 he scored his first goal of the season, in a 2–1 win against Zenit Saint Petersburg in the UEFA Champions League match. A month later on 3 November 2012, Emanuelson scored his second goal of the season, as well as, setting up two goals, in a 5–1 win against Chievo. In the Round of 16 of Coppa Italia, he set up two goals for the side, as the club won 3–0 against Reggina. By November, however, Emanuelson began to find himself placed on the substitute bench. By the time he was loaned out, Emanuelson made twenty appearances and scoring two times in all competitions.

At the start of the 2013–14 season, Emanuelson returned to the first team and made his first appearance of the season, playing in the left–back position, in a 1–1 draw against PSV Eindhoven in the first leg of the UEFA Champions League Play–Off Round. Since returning from a loan spell from the previous season, Emanuelson continued to establish himself in the left–back position, though he faced competition from Kévin Constant. At times, Emanuelson appeared three times in a midfield positions for AC Milan. He then contributed three assists for the club, winning all three matches. As the 2013–14 season progressed, competitions increased further between the two that saw both of them alternating the starting line–up and substitute role. Despite suffering injuries on two occasions throughout the 2013–14 season, Emanuelson made thirty–three appearances in all competitions. Following this, he was released by the club upon expiry of his contract.

==== Fulham (loan) ====
Emanuelson signed for English Premier League side Fulham on loan until the end of the 2012–13 season on 31 January 2013.

He made his Fulham debut on 2 February against Manchester United at Craven Cottage, coming on for Giorgos Karagounis. Since making his debut for the club, Emanuelson was involved in a number of matches in the first team, playing in different midfield positions. He scored his first goal for Fulham in a 3–0 win over Swansea City on the final day of the season. Following this, he returned to his parent club, as Manager Martin Jol previously stated that he ruled out of signing him. Reflecting in his time at Fulham, Emanuelson said: "I think I have adapted to English football even though football is completely different here. I was asked to do so. Moving to Fulham and I caught the ball: I always wanted to play in the Premier League."

=== Roma ===
On 11 July 2014, Emanuelson signed a one-year deal with Roma with the option for the club to extend his contract for another two seasons.

However, he found himself placed on the substitute bench, due to the strong competitions in every positions. On 21 September 2014 Emanuelson made his debut for the club, coming on as an 81st-minute substitute, in a 2–0 loss against Cagliari. His second appearance for Roma came on 6 January 2015, again coming on as an 83rd-minute substitute, in a 1–0 win against Udinese. With his first opportunity at Roma limited, he was expected to leave the club in January. By the time Emanuelson was loaned out, he made two appearances for Roma.

It was announced on 21 January 2015 that Emanuelson was loaned out to Atalanta for the rest of the 2014–15 season. He made his debut for the club, coming on as a 67th-minute substitute, in a 2–1 win against Cagliari. Since making his debut for Atalanta, Emanuelson's first team alternated between a starting and a substitute role for the club. In a match against Juventus on 20 February 2015, he set up Atalanta's only goal of the game, as they lost 2–1. For his performance in February, Emanuelson was awarded the club's Player of the Month. Emanuelson then set up two goals in two matches between 19 April 2015 and 26 April 2015 against Roma and Empoli. At the end of the 2014–15 season, he went on to make nine appearances for the club. Following this, Emanuelson returned to his parent club. At the end of June, he was released by Roma following the expiration of his contract.

=== Verona ===
After leaving Roma, Emanuelson went to training at his former clubs, Ajax and AC Milan, in order to maintain his fitness in hopes of joining a new club. On 3 January 2016, Emanuelson joined Hellas Verona on a free transfer.

Four days later after signing for the club on 6 January 2016, he made his Hellas Verona debut, coming on as a 62nd-minute substitute, in a 3–0 loss against Juventus. Since making his debut for the club, Emanuelson found his playing time, mostly coming from the substitute bench. He then helped Verona earn their first win, coming twenty-three games into the season after winning 2–1 against Atalanta on 3 February 2016 at home. Emanuelson then set up the club's equalising goal, having came on as a 79th-minute substitute, in a 1–1 draw against Fiorentina on 13 March 2016. However, Verona was eventually relegated from Serie A. At the end of the 2015–16 season, he went on to make eleven appearances for Verona in all competitions.

=== Sheffield Wednesday ===
After being released by Verona in the summer 2016, Emanuelson joined English Championship side Sheffield Wednesday on 6 September on a free transfer.

However, his start to his Sheffield Wednesday's career suffered a setback when he was plagued with injuries and fitness that affected the whole 2016–17 season. In the last game of the season against Fulham, Emanuelson made his debut, coming on as a 74th-minute substitute, in a 2–1 loss. This turns out to be his only appearance for Sheffield Wednesday, as he was released by the club at the end of the 2016–17 season.

=== FC Utrecht ===
Emanuelson returned to Holland in summer 2017, after signing a one-year contract with FC Utrecht.

Emanuelson made his FC Utrecht debut, coming on as an 80th-minute substitute, in a 0–0 draw against Valletta in the first leg of the UEFA Europa League Second Round. In the return leg, he played four minutes after coming on as a substitute to help the club win 3–1 to go through to the next round. Emanuelson then played four times in the UEFA Europa League Qualifying Stage, where FC Utrecht reached the play–off round, only to lose against Zenit Saint Petersburg following a 2–1 loss on aggregate. Emanuelson made his league debut for the club and set up the second goal of the game, in a 3–0 win against ADO Den Haag in the opening game of the season. Since making his debut for FC Utrecht, he quickly became a first team regular, playing in different midfield positions and left–back position. By the second half of the season, Emanuelson soon lost his first team place following the new arrival of Manager Jean-Paul de Jong. It was announced on 20 March 2018 that he signed a contract extension with the club. In a match against Willem II on 31 March 2018, he set up two goals for the side, in a 3–2 loss. In the Play–Off Round, Emanuelson played three times as the club were unsuccessful of earning a spot in the UEFA Europa League following a 5–3 aggregate defeat to Vitesse. At the end of the 2017–18 season, he went on to make thirty–eight appearances in all competitions.

At the start of the 2018–19 season, Emanuelson signed a contract extension with Utrecht, keeping him until 2020. He started out well, appearing in the first five league matches of the season and even scored his first goal for FC Utrecht, in a 1–1 draw against Fortuna Sittard on 1 September 2018. However, in a follow–up match against FC Emmen on 16 September 2018, Emanuelson was sent–off for a professional foul, just before half time, as the club lost 2–1. After serving a one math suspension, he returned to the starting line–up against FC Groningen on 30 September 2018, as FC Utrecht drew 1–1. Since returning from suspension, Emanuelson continued to remain involved in the first team for the club. He then scored his second goal for FC Utrecht, in a 2–1 win against AZ Alkmaar on 20 October 2018. On 9 December 2018 Emanuelson scored his third goal for the club, in a 3–1 win against Heracles Almelo. After the match, his performance was praised by Manager Dick Advocaat. He captained FC Utrecht for the first time against AZ Alkmaar on 19 January 2019, as the club lost 3–0. Two weeks later on 3 February 2019 against PEC Zwolle, Emanuelson set up FC Utrecht's second goal of the game before being sent–off in the 71st minute for a professional foul, in a 4–3 loss. After being sidelined throughout February, he then scored his fourth goal of the season, in a 3–2 win against Feyenoord on 31 March 2019. Despite being further sidelined towards the end of the 2018–19 season, Emanuelson played once in the play-offs for the UEFA Europa League spot, as the club went on qualify for European football following a 3–1 win against Vitesse on aggregate. At the end of the 2018–19 season, he went on to make twenty–seven appearances and scoring four times in all competitions.

At the start of the 2019–20 season, Emanuelson played in both legs of the UEFA Europa League Second Round match against HŠK Zrinjski Mostar, as FC Utrecht lost 3–1 on aggregate. However, he found his playing time, mostly coming from the substitute bench. In a 3–0 win against PSV Eindhoven on 19 October 2019, Emanuelson set up FC Utrecht's third goal of the game, having came on as a 75th-minute substitute. He later contributed three more assists for the club. With his first team opportunities limited, Emanuelson was linked a move to Major League Soccer side Atlanta United to link up with his former Manager, Frank de Boer, but the move was broken down. Following this, he soon received playing time, playing in the centre–back position. However, the 2019–20 Eredivisie and the KNVB Cup, which FC Utrecht reached the KNVB Cup Final, were halted in the Netherlands on 12 March due to the pandemic, which the season was eventually cancelled. At the end of the 2019–20 season, Emanuelson made eighteen appearances in all competitions.

Following this, the club began negotiation with a new contract to keep Emanuelson. By July, his contract with FC Utrecht expired, making him a free agent. By September, he re–joined the club on a semi–pro contract. Emanuelson made his first appearance of the 2020–21 season, coming on as a 70th-minute substitute, in a 3–1 win against RKC Waalwijk on 27 September 2020.

== International career ==
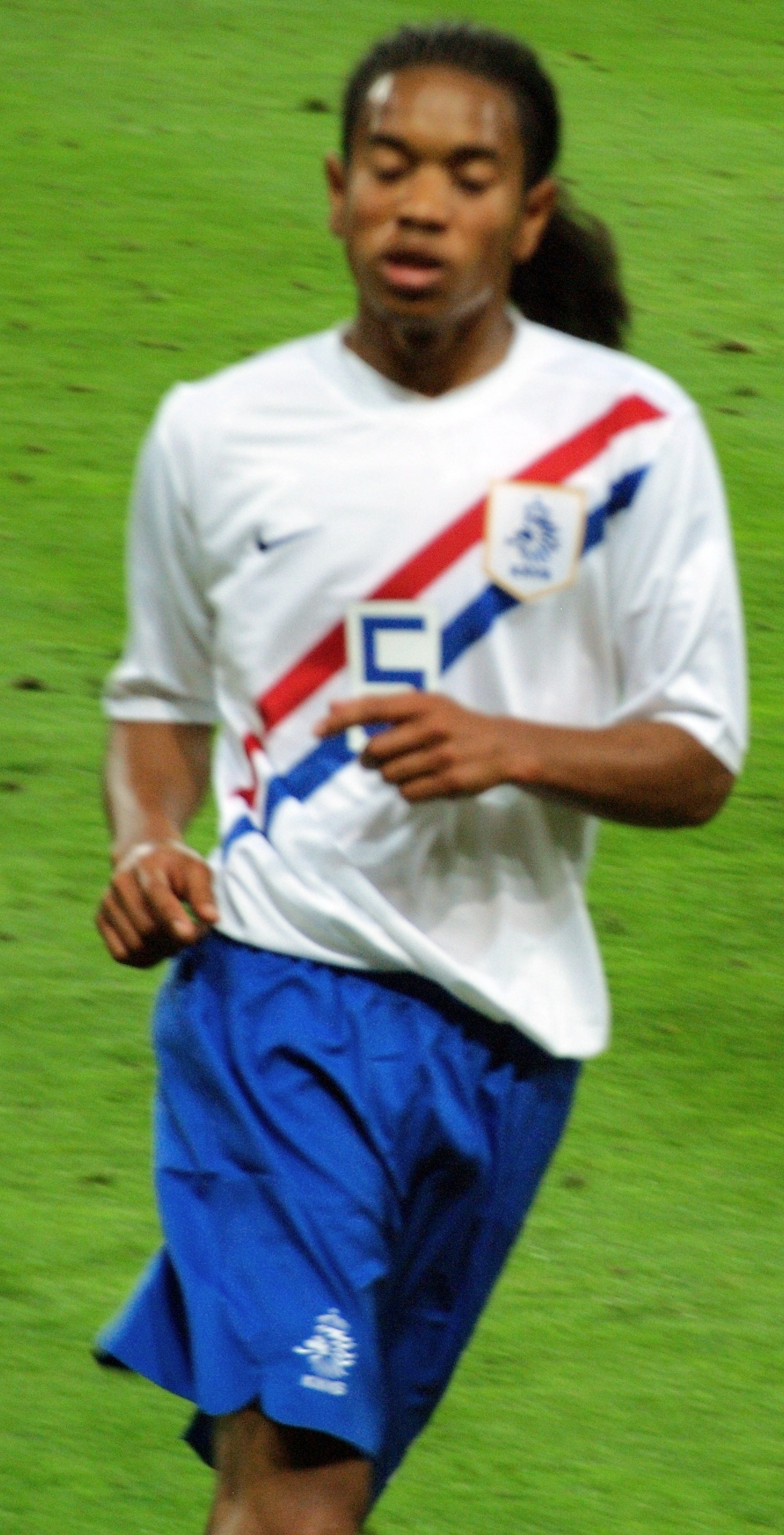
Emanuelson in action for the Netherlands

=== Youth career ===
Emanuelson represented Netherlands up to the U21 levels.

Emanuelson was a member of the Dutch squad playing at the FIFA U-20 World Cup in 2005, held in Netherlands. The Dutch were eliminated in the quarter-final against Nigeria.

In August 2005, Emanuelson was called up to the Netherlands U21 squad for the first time. He made his the national side's U21 debut on 17 August 2005 against Belgium U21, as they won 2–1. On 17 May 2006 Emanuelson scored his first Netherlands U21 goal, in a 2–2 draw against Germany U21. After being dropped from the senior team squad for the FIFA World Cup, he was called up to the U21 squad once again for the 2006's UEFA European Under-21 Championship in Portugal. Emanuelson went on to be a member of the Dutch squad that won the tournament and was named in the UEFA Team of the Tournament as a left back. Two years later, he was called up to the U21 squad for the first time. Emmanuel appeared two times, coming against Norway U21 and Switzerland U21. He went on to make eight appearances and scoring once for the U21 side.

Two years later, Emanuelson was selected by Foppe de Haan to be in the squad for the 2008 Olympic Games in Beijing, China. He played four times at the major tournament in the 2008 Summer Olympics where the team was eliminated in the quarter-finals by eventual winners Argentina. In March 2009, Emanuelson was called up to be in the Netherlands B squad. He went on to make two appearances for the B team.

=== Senior career ===
In September 2005, Manager Marco van Basten called up to the Netherlands team for the first time as part of the preliminary selection but did not make the cut. After being called up to the senior national team two more times, he was called up once more in August 2006. On 16 August 2006, Emanuelson made his debut for the Netherlands senior team in a friendly match against the Republic of Ireland, as they won 4–0. He made three more appearances for the national side by the end of the year.

The following year, Emanuelson helped Netherlands’ defence kept two consecutive clean sheets between 24 March 2007 and 28 March 2007 against Romania and Slovenia. In a match against Albania on 12 September 2007, he set up a goal for Ruud van Nistelrooy to score the only goal of the game, winning 1–0. Emanuelson then played the last 13 minutes of the game against Luxembourg on 17 November 2007, as the national side won 1–0 to qualify for the UEFA Euro 2008. Despite playing for the Netherlands occasionally during the qualifiers for UEFA Euro 2008, he was not selected in the final squad that would participate in the tournament itself.

Although Emanuelson hasn't been called up to the national team for two years, he hope his performance would earn him a spot in the World Cup. However, he never made the cut. On 28 July 2010 Emanuelson was called up to the Netherlands squad for the first time in two years. He made his first appearances in two years, starting the whole game, in a 1–1 draw against Ukraine on 11 August 2010. His next appearances for the national side came on 29 March 2011 against Hungary, coming on as a 64th-minute substitute, in a 3–2 win.

On 24 February 2012 Emanuelson was called to the Netherlands squad. His next appearance came five days later against England, coming on as a 76th-minute substitute, in a 3–2. He later made two more appearances by the end of the year.

== Career statistics ==
=== Club ===
Appearances and goals by club, season and competition
Club	Season	League			Cup		Continental		Other		Total	
Club	Season	Division	Apps	Goals	Apps	Goals	Apps	Goals	Apps	Goals	Apps	Goals
Ajax	2004–05	Eredivisie	3	0	1	0	1	0	0	0	5	0
Ajax	2005–06	Eredivisie	26	1	2	1	8	0	5	0	41	2
Ajax	2006–07	Eredivisie	31	3	4	0	6	0	5	0	46	3
Ajax	2007–08	Eredivisie	31	3	2	0	4	0	4	0	41	3
Ajax	2008–09	Eredivisie	32	4	1	0	9	0	–		42	4
Ajax	2009–10	Eredivisie	31	5	7	2	10	1	–		48	8
Ajax	2010–11	Eredivisie	18	1	3	1	10	0	1	0	32	2
Ajax	Total		172	17	20	4	48	1	15	0	255	22
AC Milan	2010–11	Serie A	9	0	2	1	0	0	–		11	1
AC Milan	2011–12	Serie A	30	2	4	0	7	0	1	0	42	2
AC Milan	2012–13	Serie A	12	1	2	0	6	1	–		20	2
AC Milan	2013–14	Serie A	24	0	1	0	8	0	–		33	0
AC Milan	Total		75	3	9	1	21	1	1	0	106	5
Fulham (loan)	2012–13	Premier League	13	1	0	0	–		–		13	1
Roma	2014–15	Serie A	2	0	0	0	0	0	–		2	0
Atalanta (loan)	2014–15	Serie A	9	0	0	0	0	0	–		9	0
Hellas Verona	2015–16	Serie A	11	0	0	0	0	0	–		11	0
Sheffield Wednesday	2016–17	Championship	1	0	0	0	0	0	–		1	0
Utrecht	2017–18	Eredivisie	28	0	2	0	6	0	3	0	39	0
Utrecht	2018–19	Eredivisie	24	4	2	0	0	0	1	0	27	4
Utrecht	2019–20	Eredivisie	13	0	3	0	2	0	–		18	0
Utrecht	2020–21	Eredivisie	13	0	0	0	–		–		13	0
Utrecht	Total		78	4	7	0	8	0	4	0	97	4
Career total			361	25	36	5	77	2	20	0	494	32

=== International ===
As of 2 November 2019

Netherlands
Year	Apps	Goals
2006	4	0
2007	6	0
2008	1	0
2009	0	0
2010	2	0
2011	1	0
2012	3	0
Total	17	0

== Personal life ==
Emanuelson comes from a football-playing family. His father Errol Emanuelson was a professional footballer who played for S.V. Robinhood in Suriname and Sint-Niklaas in Belgium before settling in Amsterdam. His older brother Julian Emanuelson, also a product of the Ajax Youth Academy, played professionally for HFC Haarlem, and for Lustenau in Austria. His sister Sharifa Emanuelson, a former basketball player, and his cousin Roché Emanuelson has played for various clubs in the SVB Hoofdklasse and for the Suriname national team. His maternal cousin is Hertha BSC midfielder Jean-Paul Boëtius. He is the second cousin of Dutch international athlete Shaquille Emanuelson. Emanuelson said he grew up idolising Clarence Seedorf and played together with him against England on 15 November 2006, describing it as "great to play with."

Emanuelson was in a long–term relationship with his girlfriend, Vanity, and together, they have two children. However, the couple ended their relationship in 2011.

== Honours ==
Ajax

- Eredivisie: 2010-11
- KNVB Cup: 2005–06, 2006–07, 2009–10
- Johan Cruyff Shield: 2005, 2006, 2007

AC Milan

- Serie A: 2010–11
- Supercoppa Italiana: 2011

Netherlands U21

- UEFA U-21 Championship: 2006

Individual

- AFC Ajax Talent of the Year: 2006 (joint)
