= Julian Emanuelson =

Footballer (born 1977)

Personal information
- Date of birth: 2 June 1977 (age 49)
- Place of birth: Paramaribo, Suriname
- Position: Midfielder

Youth career
- 1985–1995: Ajax

Senior career*
Years	Team	Apps	(Gls)
1996–1999	Haarlem	30	(2)
1999–2000	USV Holland		
2000	→ Lustenau 07 (loan)		
2001–2004	Lisse		
2004–2005	Türkiyemspor		
2006–2008	Voorland		
2008–2009	De Dijk		

International career
1993–1994	Netherlands U18	4	(0)
- * Club domestic league appearances and goals

Julian Emanuelson (born 2 June 1977) is a former professional footballer. A product of the Ajax Youth Academy, he spent most of his career playing as a midfielder for Dutch club Haarlem. He also played for Holland Sport, FC Lisse, FC Türkiyemspor in the Netherlands, and for FC Lustenau 07 in Austria. Born in Suriname, he represented the Netherlands U18 national team internationally.

== Club career ==
Born in Paramaribo, Suriname, Emanuelson immigrated to the Netherlands with his family where he progressed through the ranks of the Ajax Youth Academy. Having played for the clubs' third team Ajax Zaterdag in 1995, he was unable to break into the first team, and transferred to nearby Haarlem in 1996, playing in the Eerste Divisie, the 2nd tier of professional football in the Netherlands. In 1999 Emanuelson transferred to Utrecht amateur side Holland from where he spent a six month loan spell in Austria playing for Dutch manager Eric Orie's FC Lustenau 07. Returning to the Netherlands, he joined FC Lisse, playing in the Topklasse before joining FC Türkiyemspor in Amsterdam. He later played for Voorland and De Dijk.

== International career ==
Emanuelson made four appearances for the Netherlands U18 national team.

== Personal life ==
Emanuelson comes from a football playing family. His father Errol Emanuelson was a professional footballer who played for S.V. Robinhood in Suriname and Sint-Niklaas in Belgium. His younger brother Urby Emanuelson, also a product of the Ajax Youth Academy, played professionally for Ajax, Milan, Fulham, Roma and Atalanta as well as the Netherlands national team. While his cousin Jean-Paul Boëtius has played for Feyenoord and for the Netherlands national team as well, his paternal cousin Roché Emanuelson played for the Suriname national team, having played for various clubs in the SVB Hoofdklasse.
