= Errol Emanuelson =

Surinamese footballer

Personal information
- Full name: Errol Rudolph Emmanuelson
- Date of birth: April 16, 1953 (age 73)
- Place of birth: Paramaribo, Suriname
- Position: Forward

Youth career
- 1967–1970: Santos
- 1970–1975: Tuna

Senior career*
Years	Team	Apps	(Gls)
1975–1980	Robinhood	?	(?)
1979–1980	→ Sint-Niklaas (loan)	?	(?)

International career^{‡}
1975	Suriname Olympic	?	(?)
1976–1978	Suriname	2	(3)
- * Club domestic league appearances and goals as of December 15, 2015 ‡ National team caps and goals as of December 15, 2015

Errol 'Emau' Rudolph Emanuelson (born April 16, 1953) is a retired Surinamese footballer who played as a forward for SV Robinhood in the Hoofdklasse, and for the Suriname national team. He also spent a loan spell in Belgium playing for Sint-Niklaas.

== Career ==
Emanuelson began his career in Nieuw Nickerie, Suriname, in the youth ranks of Santos at age 14. In 1970, he moved to Paramaribo to play in the youth teams of Tuna with whom he won the youth championship. In 1975, he made the move to SV Robinhood where he played as a forward forming the attack of Robinhood together with Rinaldo Entingh and Roy George. In 1976, he made a name for himself in a friendly fixture against Dutch club Ajax while Robinhood were on a tour of the Netherlands. He helped Robinhood to win three national titles in 1975, 1976 and 1979, and was the league top scorer for three consecutive seasons in 1976, 1977 and 1978. He also helped Robinhood to placement in the CONCACAF Champions' Cup finals, where they would finish as runners-up twice, conceding to C.D. Águila from El Salvador in 1976 and Mexican side Club América in 1977. On 30 July 1979 Robinhood were granted permission by the SVB to loan Emanuelson to Belgian side Sint-Niklaas where he played for one season.

== International career ==
Emanuelson made his first appearance for the Suriname national team in 1971 playing in the Kingdom Games. In 1975, he was part of the Suriname Olympic football team playing in the preliminary rounds failing to qualify for the games. In 1978, he helped Suriname to win the CFU Championship hosted in Trinidad and Tobago scoring three goals against the Netherlands Antilles in the 2nd round of the tournament.

== Personal life ==
After his football career he moved to Amsterdam with his family. He is the father of three children. former Dutch International Urby Emanuelson, former professional footballer Julian Emanuelson, and their sister Sharifa Emanuelson, a former basketball player. Both of his Sons are products of the Ajax Youth Academy. His nephew, former Suriname International Roché Emanuelson also plays professionally in Paramaribo, having won the Surinamese Footballer of the Year award in 2000.

== Career statistics ==
=== International goals ===
Scores and results list Suriname' goal tally first.

Goal	Date	Venue	Opponent	Score	Result	Competition
1.	30 September 1978	Trinidad Stadium, Willemstad, Netherlands Antilles	Netherlands Antilles	1–0	2–0	CFU Championship
2.	13 October 1978	André Kamperveen, Paramaribo, Suriname	Netherlands Antilles	1–0	3–0	CFU Championship
3.	13 October 1978	André Kamperveen, Paramaribo, Suriname	Netherlands Antilles	3–0	3–0	CFU Championship

== Honors ==
=== Club ===
S.V. Robinhood

- SVB Hoofdklasse (3): 1975, 1976, 1979
- CONCACAF Champions' Cup Runners-up (2): 1976, 1977

=== International ===
Suriname

- CFU Championship (1): 1978

=== Individual ===
- SVB Hoofdklasse Top Goalscorer (3): 1976, 1977, 1978
