= Lucas Ramos =

Lucas Ramos may refer to:

- Lucas Ramos (footballer, born 1995), Lucas Ramos de Oliveira, Brazilian football midfielder
- Lucas Ramos (footballer, born 2001), Lucas de Ramos Silveira, Brazilian football midfielder
- Lucas Ramos (politician) (born 1986), Brazilian politician
- Lucas Ramos Roggia, Brazilian football forward
