= 2006 KNVB Cup final =

- Event: 2005–06 KNVB Cup
Ajax	PSV
2	1
- Date: 7 May 2006
- Venue: De Kuip, Rotterdam
- Referee: Pieter Vink
- Attendance: 30,770

The 2006 KNVB Cup final was a football match between Ajax and PSV on 7 May 2006 at De Kuip, Rotterdam. It was the final match of the 2005–06 KNVB Cup competition. Ajax won 2–1, both of their goals being scored by Klaas-Jan Huntelaar. Michael Lamey scored for PSV.

== Route to the final ==
Ajax		Round	PSV	
Opponent	Result		Opponent	Result
FC Eindhoven	6–1 (A)	Round of 16	FC Twente	3–0 (H)
Heerenveen	3–0 (A)	Quarter-finals	FC Groningen	3–2 (A)
Roda JC	4–1 (a.e.t.) (H)	Semi-finals	AZ	2–0 (a.e.t.) (H)

== Match ==
=== Details ===
7 May 2006
18:00 CEST

Ajax	2–1	PSV
Huntelaar 48', 90'	Report	Lamey 53'

De Kuip, Rotterdam
Attendance: 30,770
Referee: Pieter Vink

Ajax	PSV

GK	1	(Netherlands) Maarten Stekelenburg
RB	31	(Ghana) Emmanuel Boakye
CB	4	(Netherlands) John Heitinga
CB	15	(Belgium) Thomas Vermaelen	(yellow card) 53'
LB	19	(Netherlands) Urby Emanuelson
CM	6	(Czech Republic) Tomáš Galásek (c)	(yellow card) 42' (yellow-red card) 64'
CM	28	(Morocco) Nourdin Boukhari
AM	18	(Netherlands) Wesley Sneijder	(yellow card) 88'
RW	9	(Greece) Angelos Charisteas		(substituted off) 65'
CF	25	(Netherlands) Klaas-Jan Huntelaar	(yellow card) 83'
LW	24	(Sweden) Markus Rosenberg		(substituted off) 46'
Substitutes:
GK	12	(South Africa) Hans Vonk
DF	22	(Spain) Juanfran
MF	8	(Netherlands) Hedwiges Maduro		(substituted on) 65'
MF	10	(South Africa) Steven Pienaar
MF	21	(Netherlands) Olaf Lindenbergh
FW	11	(Netherlands) Ryan Babel		(substituted on) 46'
FW	29	(Romania) Nicolae Mitea
Manager:
(Netherlands) Danny Blind

GK	1	(Brazil) Gomes
RB	19	(Netherlands) Michael Lamey	(yellow card) 53' (yellow-red card) 70'
CB	2	(Netherlands) André Ooijer
CB	18	(Ghana) Eric Addo
LB	5	(England) Michael Ball	(yellow card) 36'
CM	20	(Netherlands) Ibrahim Afellay		(substituted off) 59'
CM	6	(Belgium) Timmy Simons
CM	8	(Netherlands) Phillip Cocu (c)
RW	17	(Peru) Jefferson Farfán
CF	9	(Netherlands) Jan Vennegoor of Hesselink
LW	11	(United States) DaMarcus Beasley
Substitutes:
DF	16	(Netherlands) Theo Lucius
MF	15	(Australia) Jason Culina
MF	37	(Netherlands) Ismaïl Aissati
FW	10	(Ivory Coast) Arouna Koné		(substituted on) 59'
FW	35	(Netherlands) Gerald Sibon
Manager:
(Netherlands) Guus Hiddink

Match rules

- 90 minutes.
- 30 minutes of extra-time if necessary.
- Penalty shoot-out if scores still level.
- Maximum of three substitutions.
