= Michael Ball (footballer) =

English footballer

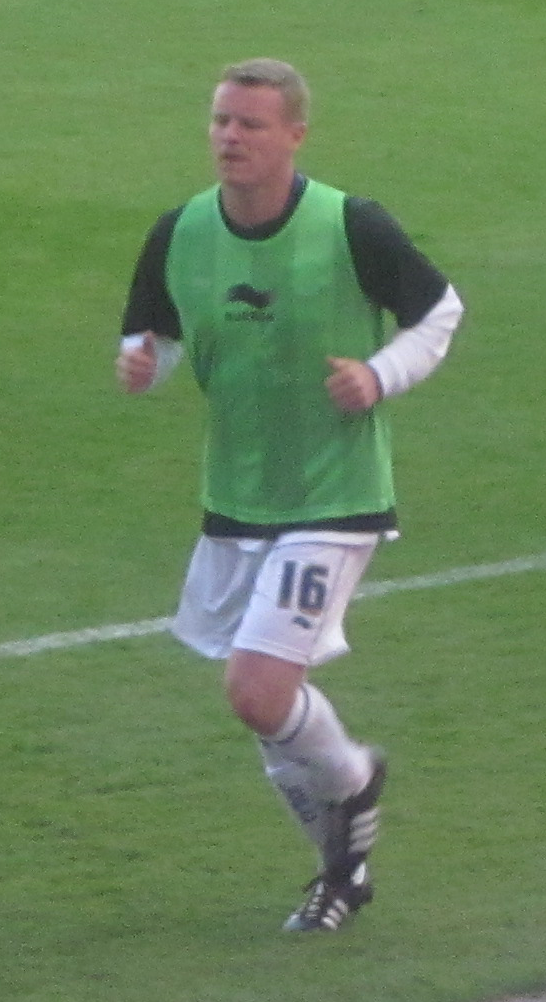
- Ball warming up for Leicester City in 2011

Personal information
- Full name: Michael John Ball
- Date of birth: 2 October 1979 (age 47)
- Place of birth: Liverpool, England
- Height: 5 ft 10 in (1.78 m)
- Position: Left back

Senior career*
Years	Team	Apps	(Gls)
1996–2001	Everton	121	(8)
2001–2005	Rangers	55	(1)
2005–2007	PSV Eindhoven	11	(2)
2007–2009	Manchester City	48	(0)
2011–2012	Leicester City	0	(0)
Total		235	(11)

International career
2001	England	1	(0)
- * Club domestic league appearances and goals

Michael John Ball (born 2 October 1979) is an English former professional footballer who played as a left back.

Ball started his professional career at Everton, making his debut as a 17-year-old in 1997. He was capped by the England national team in 2001. Ball joined Rangers in the 2001 close season in a £6.5 million transfer. In the 2004–05 season, Ball won Scottish Premier League and Scottish League Cup medals with Rangers.

Before the start of the 2005–06 season, Ball was signed by PSV Eindhoven. He spent one and a half seasons with the club, winning the Dutch Eredivisie. Ball was sold to Manchester City in 2007. After two years without a club, he signed for Leicester City in 2011.

== Club career ==
=== Everton (1996–2001) ===
Ball was born in Liverpool, Merseyside. As a schoolboy he was part of the Liverpool youth system, playing alongside Michael Owen and Steven Gerrard. From 1994 to 1996 he attended The Football Association's National School at Lilleshall, before joining Everton. He played his first senior match in April 1997 as a substitute against Tottenham Hotspur, and made his first start a week later at West Ham United. Ball developed into an impressive player equally adept at both centre back and his main position, left back. His solid performances for Everton led to an England national team call-up to Sven-Göran Eriksson's first England squad for a friendly against Spain in February 2001. Ball was named as a substitute, and made his debut when he replaced Chris Powell at half-time.

=== Rangers (2001–2005) ===
In 2001, he was allowed to leave Everton, primarily due to the club's financial problems. Although he had offers from Premier League clubs, he opted for a lucrative deal with Scottish Premier League (SPL) club Rangers and moved to Glasgow in a £6.5 million deal. His first Old Firm match ended in controversy when he swore at Rangers manager Dick Advocaat after being substituted, resulting in a £10,000 fine. He scored his first Rangers goal in the UEFA Cup against Dynamo Moscow. In December 2001, after his eleventh Rangers appearance, he suffered medial ligament damage which kept him sidelined for 18 months, including the entire 2002–03 season. Upon his return to fitness he regained his place in the team, becoming a first-team regular in the 2003–04 season, scoring his first league goal against Dundee. He also won the Player of the Month award in his first month back.

Ball's transfer to Rangers included instalments payable after fixed numbers of appearances. As Ball approached 60 appearances Rangers became reluctant to play him, as doing so would trigger a £500,000 payment to Everton. As a result, Ball played only four matches in the first four months of the 2004–05 season. The scenario was eventually resolved in December 2004 when negotiations involving the player and the two clubs reached an undisclosed agreement. With the contractual wrangling resolved, Ball returned to the first team, and won a Scottish League Cup medal and an SPL medal as Rangers won the 2004–05 title.

=== PSV Eindhoven (2005–2007) ===
In the 2005 close season, Rangers wished to remove the higher earners from their wage bill, so Ball moved to Dutch Eredivisie club PSV Eindhoven for a fee of £500,000, signing a two-year contract. Ball struggled with injury and fitness issues during his time in the Netherlands. However, he went on to win the Eredivisie title and also reached the final of the KNVB Cup in 2006, losing 1–0 to Ajax in Rotterdam.

=== Manchester City (2007–2009) ===
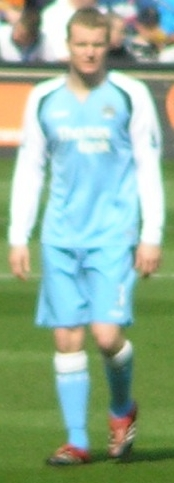
Ball playing for Manchester City in 2007

He joined Manchester City on 31 January 2007 after impressing on a week-long trial, on a six-month contract for a nominal fee. He made his debut ten days later against Portsmouth, and scored his first goal for the club in an FA Cup fifth-round match against Preston North End on 18 February. He was often used as third-choice captain, when either captain Richard Dunne or vice-captain Micah Richards were unavailable. On 5 May 2007, in a 1–0 home defeat to Manchester United, he stamped on Cristiano Ronaldo's stomach. This was missed by the referee, and he was subsequently banned for three matches.

On 24 August 2008, Ball was given the captain's armband in the 46th minute after stand in captain Richards was knocked out in a challenge with a teammate and substituted during a game against West Ham United. City went on to score three goals and win the game 3–0.

At the end of January 2009 Ball had a knee operation on his left patella tendon, which kept him out of action for nine months. On 1 July 2009, he was released by Manchester City when his contract expired.

=== Free agent ===
In January 2010, Ball was reported to be training with Wigan Athletic and to be regaining match fitness. However, no contract was offered. Subsequently, in September 2010, Ball was reported as training with Blackpool, but again no contract was offered.

=== Leicester City (2011–2012) ===
Ball was on trial with Leicester City in July 2011, travelling on their pre-season tour of Sweden and Austria. He signed a one-year contract on 8 August 2011, after featuring in six pre-season friendlies. Ball made his competitive debut in a 4–1 win over Rotherham in the League Cup first round on 9 August 2011. Ball made three appearances for Leicester, all in the League Cup, and left the club on 24 January 2012 after his contract was terminated by mutual consent.

== International career ==
In February 2001, he made his only appearance for England in a friendly against Spain, coming on as a half-time substitute for Chris Powell.

== Career statistics ==
Club performance			League		Cup		League Cup		Continental		Total	
Season	Club	League	Apps	Goals	Apps	Goals	Apps	Goals	Apps	Goals	Apps	Goals
England			League		FA Cup		League Cup		Europe		Total	
1996–97	Everton	Premier League	5	0							5	0
1997–98	Everton	Premier League	25	1	1	0	2	0			28	1
1998–99	Everton	Premier League	37	3	3	0	4	0			44	3
1999–00	Everton	Premier League	25	1	2	0	2	0			29	1
2000–01	Everton	Premier League	29	3	2	0	2	0			33	3
Scotland			League		Scottish Cup		League Cup		Europe		Total	
2001–02	Rangers	Scottish Premier League	8	0			1	0	2	1	11	1
2002–03	Rangers	Scottish Premier League	0	0								
2003–04	Rangers	Scottish Premier League	32	1	2	0	1	0	8	0	43	1
2004–05	Rangers	Scottish Premier League	14	0			2	0	2	0	18	0
2005–06	Rangers	Scottish Premier League	2	0					2	0	4	0
Netherlands			League		KNVB Cup		League Cup		Europe		Total	
2005–06	PSV Eindhoven	Eredivisie	11	0	1	0					12	0
2006–07	PSV Eindhoven	Eredivisie	0	0								
England			League		FA Cup		League Cup		Europe		Total	
2006–07	Manchester City	Premier League	12	0	2	1					14	1
2007–08	Manchester City	Premier League	28	0	3	0	4	0			35	0
2008–09	Manchester City	Premier League	8	0	1	0	1	0	4	0	14	0
2011–12	Leicester City	Championship	0	0	0	0	3	0	-	-	3	0
Total	England		169	8	14	1	18	0			201	9
Total	Scotland		56	1	2	0	4	0	14	1	76	2
Total	Netherlands		11	0	1	0					12	0
Career total			236	9	17	1	22	0	14	1	289	11

== Honours ==
Rangers

- Scottish Premier League: 2004–05
- Scottish League Cup: 2004–05

PSV Eindhoven

- Eredivisie: 2005–06
