= Roché Emanuelson =

Surinamese footballer

Personal information
- Full name: Roché Emanuelson
- Date of birth: April 5, 1982 (age 44)
- Place of birth: Paramaribo, Suriname
- Position: Defender

Team information
- Current team: Boma Star

Senior career*
Years	Team	Apps	(Gls)
1999–2000	Transvaal	?	(?)
2002–2004	Robinhood	?	(?)
2004–2007	Royal '95	?	(?)
2007–2008	Robinhood	?	(?)
2009–2014	Leo Victor	?	(?)
2015–2016	Boma Star	?	(?)
2016–	Leo Victor	?	(?)

International career^{‡}
2004–2010	Suriname	12	(4)
- * Club domestic league appearances and goals as of December 16, 2015 ‡ National team caps and goals as of December 16, 2015

Roché Emanuelson (born April 5, 1982) is a Surinamese footballer who plays as a defender for Boma Star in the Hoofdklasse, and for the Suriname national team. He has also played for SV Transvaal, SV Robinhood, Royal '95 and SV Leo Victor in the past.

He also plays futsal, having played for Styx Kuldipsingh, and for Telesur in the SZVB Hoofdklasse and for the national futsal team.

== Career ==
Emanuelson began his career in Paramaribo, Suriname. In 1999, he made his debut in the Hoofdklasse playing for SV Transvaal, helping his side to the national championship, winning the Surinamese Footballer of the Year award by the end of the season. The following season, however, no competition was held in Suriname. In 2002, he signed with SV Robinhood, the former club of his heralded Uncle Errol Emanuelson. After two seasons, Emanuelson transferred once more, this time to Royal '95, only to return to Robinhood after three seasons. In 2009 Emanuelson signed with SV Leo Victor whom he helped to win the Surinamese Cup in 2014, having also played in the CFU Club Championship. The following season saw Emanuelson join his fifth club in the league when he signed with Boma Star.

== International career ==
Emanuelson plays for the Suriname national team. He has played in FIFA World Cup qualification matches, as well as the CFU Championship. In 2010, he helped Suriname to win the ABCS Tournament, scoring once in the final against Curaçao, in a 2–2 draw which was decided on penalties.

== Personal life ==
Emanuelson is the nephew of former Suriname International football star Errol Emanuelson. His cousins are Dutch International footballer Urby Emanuelson, and former professional footballer Julian Emanuelson both brothers, and their sister Sharifa Emanuelson, a former basketball player in the Netherlands.

== Career statistics ==
=== International goals ===
Scores and results list Suriname' goal tally first.

Goal	Date	Venue	Opponent	Score	Result	Competition
1.	30 October 2009	André Kamperveen Stadion, Paramaribo, Suriname	French Guiana	1–0	4–0	Friendly
2.	31 October 2010	Ergilio Hato Stadium, Willemstad, Curaçao	Curaçao	2–0	2–2	ABCS Tournament
3.	10 November 2010	Antigua Recreation Ground, St. John's, Antigua and Barbuda	Antigua and Barbuda	1–1	1–2	2010 Caribbean Cup qualification
4.	14 November 2010	Antigua Recreation Ground, St. John's, Antigua and Barbuda	Dominica	4–0	5–0	2010 Caribbean Cup qualification

== Honors ==
=== Club ===
S.V. Transvaal

- SVB Hoofdklasse: 1999–2000

S.V. Leo Victor

- Surinamese Cup: 2014

=== International ===
Suriname

- ABCS Tournament: 2010

=== Individual ===
- Surinamese Footballer of the Year: 2000
