= Lucas Roggia =

Brazilian footballer

Personal information
- Full name: Lucas Ramos Roggia
- Date of birth: 21 January 1991 (age 35)
- Place of birth: Santa Maria, Rio Grande do Sul, Brazil
- Height: 1.77 m (5 ft 9 1/2 in)
- Position: Forward

Team information
- Current team: Juventude

Youth career
- 2007–2009: Internacional

Senior career*
Years	Team	Apps	(Gls)
2011–2013	Internacional		
2012	→ Milan (loan)	0	(0)
2014	Internacional-B		
2014–2015	Beira-Mar		
2015–	Juventude		
- * Club domestic league appearances and goals as of 2019

Lucas Ramos Roggia (born 21 January 1991) is a Brazilian professional footballer who plays as a forward for Juventude.

== Club career ==
Roggia started his professional career with Internacional of Porto Alegre, making up a total two appearances in the Brasileirão and four in the Campeonato Gaúcho. In January 2012, he joined Italian Serie A side Milan on a loan deal. He made no appearances for the first team, instead playing for the Primavera (under-20) squad, before returning to Internacional in July, at the end of the loan spell.

== Statistics ==
As of 1 July 2012.

Team	Season	Domestic League		Domestic Cup		Continental Competition^{1}		Other Tournaments^{2}		Total	
Team	Season	Apps	Goals	Apps	Goals	Apps	Goals	Apps	Goals	Apps	Goals
Internacional	2010	0	0	0	0	0	0	1	0	1	0
Internacional	2011	2	0	0	0	0	0	2	0	4	0
Internacional	2012	0	0	0	0	0	0	1	0	1	0
Milan	2012	0	0	0	0	0	0	–		0	0
Internacional	2012	0	0	0	0	0	0	0	0	0	0
Internacional	Total	2	0	0	0	0	0	4	0	6	0
Career Total		2	0	0	0	0	0	4	0	6	0

^{1}Continental competitions include the Copa Libertadores and the UEFA Champions League.
^{2}Other tournaments include the Campeonato Gaúcho.

== Personal life ==
In addition to his Brazilian citizenship, Roggia also holds an Italian passport.
