= Sint-Niklase SK =

Association football club

Koninklijke Sint-Niklase Sportkring Excelsior was a Belgian football club from the town of Sint-Niklaas that merged with KSC Lokeren in 2000, establishing K.S.C. Lokeren Oost-Vlaanderen.

It was created in 1920 as F.C. Beerschot but the name changed a year later to V.V. Beerschot Sint-Niklaas. The club then registered to the Belgian FA as Sint-Niklaassche S.K. in 1922 and received the matricule n°221. Right after World War II, Sint-Niklaassche qualified for the first division but only stayed at that level for two seasons. Following the relegation, the name changed to Sint-Niklaasse S.K. and then to K. Sint-Niklase S.K. in 1974.

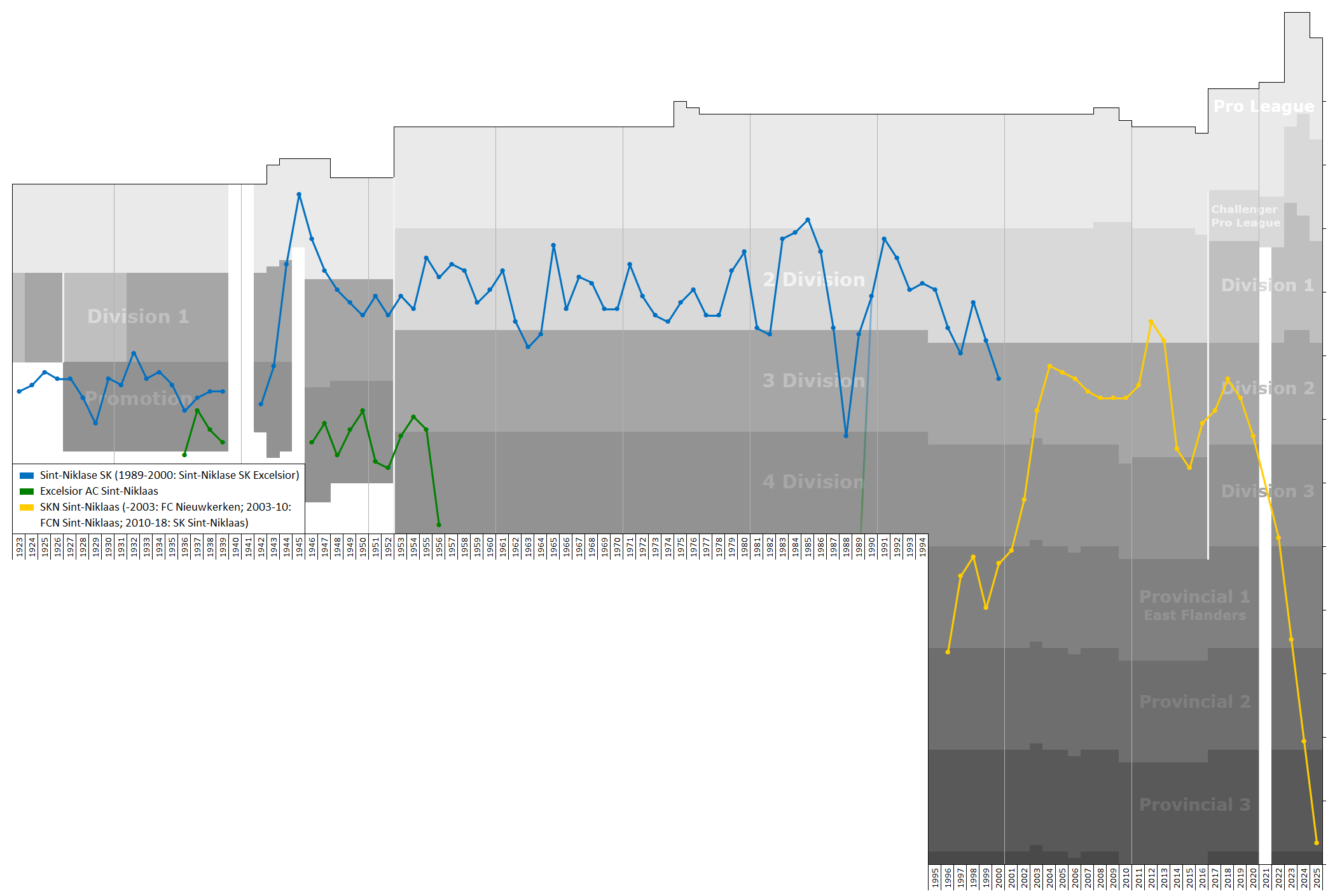
Historical chart of Sint-Niklase SK league performance

In 1984, Sint-Niklase won the Second Division championship and earned promotion to the First Division, but was relegated back in the next season. In 1989, the club merged with Royal Excelsior AC Sint-Niklaas (registration number 239) and continued as K. Sint-Niklase SK Excelsior. In 2000, after the merger with KSC Lokeren, matricule 221 was dissolved.
