= 2006–07 AFC Ajax season =

Dutch football club season

Ajax
2006–07 season
- Chairman: John Jaakke
- Manager: Henk ten Cate
- Eredivisie: 2nd
- KNVB Cup: Winners
- Champions League: Play-off round
- UEFA Cup: Round of 32
- Johan Cruyff Shield: Winners
- Top goalscorer: League: Klaas-Jan Huntelaar (21 goals); All: Klaas-Jan Huntelaar (35 goals)
| Home colours | Away colours | European home colours |

During the 2006–07 season AFC Ajax participated in the Eredivisie, the KNVB Cup, UEFA Champions League and the UEFA Cup. The first training took place on Saturday, 8 July 2006. The traditional AFC Ajax Open Day was on Wednesday, 8 August 2006, followed by a testimonial match for the retired former Ajax striker Dennis Bergkamp.

== Pre-season ==
The first training for the 2006–07 season was held on July 8, 2006. In preparation for the new season Ajax organized a training camp in De Lutte, Netherlands at the De Thij Sportpark. During the pre-season, the squad from manager Henk ten Cate played friendly matches against JOS Watergraafsmeer, ABS, SV de Lutte, HHC Hardenberg, VV Bennekom, SV Spakenburg and FC Emmen before traveling to Germany to play against Borussia Dortmund. They then returned to Amsterdam to play Internazionale and Manchester United in the annual Amsterdam Tournament.

== Player statistics ==
Appearances for competitive matches only

| No. | Pos | Nat | Player | Total | | Eredivisie | | UEFA Cup | | KNVB Cup | |
| No. | Pos | Nat | Player | Apps | Goals | Apps | Goals | Apps | Goals | Apps | Goals |
|---|---|---|---|---|---|---|---|---|---|---|---|
| 1 | GK | (Netherlands) NED | Maarten Stekelenburg | 43 | 0 | 32 | 0 | 7 | 0 | 4 | 0 |
| 2 | DF | (Netherlands) NED | John Heitinga | 44 | 8 | 32 | 6 | 7 | 1 | 3+2 | 1 |
| 3 | DF | (Netherlands) NED | Jaap Stam | 36 | 2 | 25 | 1 | 7 | 0 | 4 | 1 |
| 4 | DF | (Belgium) BEL | Thomas Vermaelen | 33 | 0 | 16+7 | 0 | 4+1 | 0 | 5 | 0 |
| 5 | DF | (Netherlands) NED | Urby Emanuelson | 39 | 3 | 30+1 | 3 | 4 | 0 | 3+1 | 0 |
| 6 | MF | (Netherlands) NED | Hedwiges Maduro | 24 | 2 | 9+6 | 0 | 5 | 1 | 3+1 | 1 |
| 8 | FW | (Netherlands) NED | Ryan Babel | 36 | 7 | 25+2 | 5 | 3+2 | 2 | 2+2 | 0 |
| 9 | FW | (Netherlands) NED | Klaas-Jan Huntelaar | 45 | 32 | 31+1 | 21 | 7 | 7 | 5+1 | 4 |
| 10 | FW | (Netherlands) NED | Wesley Sneijder | 41 | 20 | 30 | 18 | 7 | 1 | 4 | 1 |
| 11 | FW | (Denmark) DEN | Kenneth Perez | 38 | 15 | 10+17 | 12 | 4+1 | 0 | 3+3 | 3 |
| 12 | GK | (Netherlands) NED | Kenneth Vermeer | 1 | 0 | 0 | 0 | 0+1 | 0 | 0 | 0 |
| 13 | MF | (Netherlands) NED | Edgar Davids | 14 | 1 | 11 | 1 | 0 | 0 | 3 | 0 |
| 14 | MF | (Spain) ESP | Roger | 17 | 2 | 7+4 | 1 | 4 | 1 | 1+1 | 0 |
| 15 | MF | (Netherlands) NED | Olaf Lindenbergh | 19 | 0 | 5+7 | 0 | 2+2 | 0 | 3 | 0 |
| 16 | FW | (Belgium) BEL | Tom De Mul | 38 | 4 | 23+5 | 4 | 2+5 | 0 | 2+1 | 0 |
| 18 | MF | (Spain) ESP | Gabri | 40 | 6 | 31 | 5 | 6 | 0 | 3 | 1 |
| 19 | FW | (Denmark) DEN | Dennis Rommedahl | 0 | 0 | 0 | 0 | 0 | 0 | 0 | 0 |
| 20 | DF | (Romania) ROU | George Ogăraru | 33 | 6 | 18+10 | 5+1 | 0 | 0 | 5 | 0 |
| 21 | FW | (Romania) ROU | Nicolae Mitea | 12 | 3 | 1+7 | 2 | 0+1 | 0 | 0+3 | 1 |
| 22 | DF | (Czech Republic) CZE | Zdeněk Grygera | 31 | 4 | 21+1 | 3 | 5 | 1 | 4 | 0 |
| 23 | DF | (Brazil) BRA | Leonardo | 11 | 3 | 4+3 | 1 | 1+1 | 1 | 2 | 1 |
| 24 | MF | (Netherlands) NED | John Goossens | 0 | 0 | 0 | 0 | 0 | 0 | 0 | 0 |
| 25 | MF | (Netherlands) NED | Jeffrey Sarpong | 1 | 0 | 0 | 0 | 0 | 0 | 0+1 | 0 |
| 26 | FW | (Armenia) ARM | Edgar Manucharyan | 8 | 1 | 0+5 | 0 | 2 | 1 | 1 | 0 |
| 30 | GK | (Netherlands) NED | Dennis Gentenaar | 5 | 0 | 2 | 0 | 1 | 0 | 2 | 0 |
| 32 | GK | (Netherlands) NED | Marco van Duin | 0 | 0 | 0 | 0 | 0 | 0 | 0 | 0 |
| 33 | FW | (Netherlands Antilles) ANT | Vurnon Anita | 2 | 0 | 1 | 0 | 0+1 | 0 | 0 | 0 |
| 34 | DF | (Netherlands) NED | Vito Wormgoor | 0 | 0 | 0 | 0 | 0 | 0 | 0 | 0 |
| 35 | DF | (Netherlands) NED | Gregory van der Wiel | 4 | 0 | 3+1 | 0 | 0 | 0 | 0 | 0 |
| 36 | MF | (Netherlands) NED | Mitchell Donald | 1 | 0 | 0 | 0 | 1 | 0 | 0 | 0 |
| 38 | DF | (Belgium) BEL | Toby Alderweireld | 0 | 0 | 0 | 0 | 0 | 0 | 0 | 0 |
| 39 | MF | (Netherlands Antilles) ANT | Javier Martina | 0 | 0 | 0 | 0 | 0 | 0 | 0 | 0 |
| 56 | MF | (Netherlands) NED | Dionitio Liesdek | 0 | 0 | 0 | 0 | 0 | 0 | 0 | 0 |
| 62 | DF | (Netherlands) NED | Michael Timisela | 0 | 0 | 0 | 0 | 0 | 0 | 0 | 0 |
| 67 | DF | (Netherlands) NED | Murat Yıldırım | 0 | 0 | 0 | 0 | 0 | 0 | 0 | 0 |
Players sold or loaned out after the start of the season:
| 7 | FW | (Argentina) ARG | Mauro Rosales | 19 | 1 | 6+6 | 1 | 3+1 | 0 | 3 | 0 |
| 17 | FW | (Denmark) DEN | Michael Krohn-Dehli | 3 | 0 | 0+3 | 0 | 0 | 0 | 0 | 0 |
| 19 | FW | (Sweden) SWE | Markus Rosenberg | 13 | 5 | 9 | 0 | 3 | 3 | 1 | 2 |
| 27 | FW | (Greece) GRE | Angelos Charisteas | 1 | 0 | 0+1 | 0 | 0 | 0 | 0 | 0 |
| 28 | DF | (Belgium) BEL | Jan Vertonghen | 5 | 0 | 1+2 | 0 | 0+2 | 0 | 0 | 0 |
| 29 | FW | (Netherlands) NED | Rydell Poepon | 0 | 0 | 0 | 0 | 0 | 0 | 0 | 0 |
| 31 | MF | (Belgium) BEL | Stanley Aborah | 0 | 0 | 0 | 0 | 0 | 0 | 0 | 0 |
| 33 | FW | (Netherlands) NED | Derk Boerrigter | 0 | 0 | 0 | 0 | 0 | 0 | 0 | 0 |
| 37 | MF | (Netherlands) NED | Donovan Slijngard | 0 | 0 | 0 | 0 | 0 | 0 | 0 | 0 |

As of 14 November 2011

== Team statistics ==
=== 2006–07 Eredivisie standings ===
| Standing | Matches played | Wins | Draws | Losses | Points | Goals for | Goals against | Yellow cards (yellow card) | Red cards (red card) |
|---|---|---|---|---|---|---|---|---|---|
| 2 | 34 | 23 | 6 | 5 | 75 | 84 | 34 | 60 | 4 |

==== Points by match day ====
| Match day | 1 | 2 | 3 | 4 | 5 | 6 | 7 | 8 | 9 | 10 | 11 | 12 | 13 | 14 | 15 | 16 | 17 | 18 | 19 | 20 | 21 | 22 | 23 | 24 | 25 | 26 | 27 | 28 | 29 | 30 | 31 | 32 | 33 | 34 | Total |
|---|---|---|---|---|---|---|---|---|---|---|---|---|---|---|---|---|---|---|---|---|---|---|---|---|---|---|---|---|---|---|---|---|---|---|---|
| Points | 3 | 3 | 3 | 0 | 3 | 3 | 3 | 3 | 3 | 3 | 3 | 0 | 1 | 0 | 3 | 1 | 3 | 0 | 3 | 1 | 3 | 3 | 3 | 3 | 1 | 1 | 0 | 3 | 3 | 3 | 1 | 3 | 3 | 3 | 75 |

==== Total points by match day ====
| Match day | 1 | 2 | 3 | 4 | 5 | 6 | 7 | 8 | 9 | 10 | 11 | 12 | 13 | 14 | 15 | 16 | 17 | 18 | 19 | 20 | 21 | 22 | 23 | 24 | 25 | 26 | 27 | 28 | 29 | 30 | 31 | 32 | 33 | 34 | Total |
|---|---|---|---|---|---|---|---|---|---|---|---|---|---|---|---|---|---|---|---|---|---|---|---|---|---|---|---|---|---|---|---|---|---|---|---|
| Points | 3 | 6 | 9 | 9 | 12 | 15 | 18 | 21 | 24 | 27 | 30 | 30 | 31 | 31 | 34 | 35 | 38 | 38 | 41 | 42 | 45 | 48 | 51 | 54 | 55 | 56 | 56 | 59 | 62 | 65 | 66 | 69 | 72 | 75 | 75 |

==== Standing by match day ====
| Match day | 1 | 2 | 3 | 4 | 5 | 6 | 7 | 8 | 9 | 10 | 11 | 12 | 13 | 14 | 15 | 16 | 17 | 18 | 19 | 20 | 21 | 22 | 23 | 24 | 25 | 26 | 27 | 28 | 29 | 30 | 31 | 32 | 33 | 34 | Standing |
|---|---|---|---|---|---|---|---|---|---|---|---|---|---|---|---|---|---|---|---|---|---|---|---|---|---|---|---|---|---|---|---|---|---|---|---|
| Standing | 2nd | 3rd | 2nd | 5th | 2nd | 1st | 1st | 1st | 1st | 1st | 1st | 2nd | 2nd | 3rd | 3rd | 3rd | 3rd | 3rd | 2nd | 2nd | 2nd | 2nd | 2nd | 2nd | 2nd | 2nd | 4th | 3rd | 2nd | 2nd | 3rd | 3rd | 2nd | 2nd | 2nd |

==== Goals by match day ====
| Match day | 1 | 2 | 3 | 4 | 5 | 6 | 7 | 8 | 9 | 10 | 11 | 12 | 13 | 14 | 15 | 16 | 17 | 18 | 19 | 20 | 21 | 22 | 23 | 24 | 25 | 26 | 27 | 28 | 29 | 30 | 31 | 32 | 33 | 34 | Total |
|---|---|---|---|---|---|---|---|---|---|---|---|---|---|---|---|---|---|---|---|---|---|---|---|---|---|---|---|---|---|---|---|---|---|---|---|
| Goals | 5 | 2 | 3 | 0 | 2 | 3 | 3 | 4 | 2 | 2 | 3 | 0 | 1 | 0 | 6 | 2 | 3 | 2 | 2 | 2 | 2 | 3 | 4 | 2 | 2 | 1 | 0 | 4 | 5 | 3 | 2 | 2 | 5 | 2 | 84 |

=== Statistics for the 2006–07 season ===
- This is an overview of all the statistics for played matches in the 2006–07 season.

| | Friendlies | Amsterdam Tournament | Johan Cruijff Schaal | KNVB Cup | UEFA Champions League | UEFA Cup | Eredivisie | UEFA Champions League Qualifying Play-offs | Total |
|---|---|---|---|---|---|---|---|---|---|
| Matches | 9 | 2 | 1 | 6 | 2 | 8 | 34 | 4 | 66 |
| Wins | 6 | 0 | 1 | 6 | 1 | 5 | 23 | 2 | 44 |
| Draws | 0 | 1 | 0 | 0 | 0 | 1 | 6 | 0 | 8 |
| Losses | 3 | 1 | 0 | 0 | 1 | 2 | 5 | 2 | 14 |
| Home | 0 | 2 | 0 | 3 | 1 | 4 | 17 | 2 | 29 |
| Away | 9 | 0 | 1 | 3 | 1 | 4 | 17 | 2 | 37 |
| Yellow cards (yellow card) | 3 | 5 | 1 | 5 | 6 | 19 | 60 | 8 | 107 |
| Red cards (red card) | 0 | 0 | 0 | 1 | 0 | 0 | 2 | 0 | 3 |
| 2 x yellow in 1 match (yellow card) (yellow-red card) | 0 | 0 | 0 | 0 | 0 | 2 | 2 | 0 | 4 |
| Number of substitutes used (substituted on) (substituted off) | 50 | 7 | 3 | 15 | 5 | 21 | 98 | 10 | 119 |
| Goals for | 56 | 1 | 3 | 17 | 2 | 18 | 84 | 8 | 189 |
| Goals against | 9 | 2 | 1 | 4 | 3 | 9 | 34 | 3 | 65 |
| Balance | +24 | -1 | +2 | +13 | -1 | +9 | +50 | +5 | +124 |
| Clean sheets | 5 | 0 | 0 | 3 | 0 | 1 | 12 | 2 | 23 |
| Penalties for | 2 | 0 | 0 | 0 | 0 | 0 | 4 | 0 | 6 |
| Penalties against | 1 | 0 | 0 | 0 | 0 | 0 | 4 | 0 | 5 |

=== 2006–07 team records ===
| Description | Competition | Result |
|---|---|---|
| Biggest win | (Netherlands) Friendly match | SV de Lutte – AFC Ajax ( 0–18 ) |
| Biggest win | (Netherlands) KNVB Cup | AFC Ajax – HFC Haarlem ( 4–0 ) |
| Biggest win | (European Union) UEFA Champions League | F.C. København – AFC Ajax ( 1–2 ) |
| Biggest win | (European Union) UEFA Cup | AFC Ajax – IK Start ( 4–0 ) |
| Biggest win | (Netherlands) Eredivisie | AFC Ajax – Willem II ( 6–0 ) |
| Biggest loss | (South Africa) Friendly match | Ajax Cape Town – AFC Ajax ( 3–1 ) |
| Biggest loss | (Netherlands) KNVB Cup | — |
| Biggest loss | (European Union) UEFA Champions League | AFC Ajax – F.C. København ( 0–2 ) |
| Biggest loss | (European Union) UEFA Cup | SV Werder Bremen – AFC Ajax ( 3–0 ) |
| Biggest loss | (Netherlands) Eredivisie | AFC Ajax – NAC Breda ( 1–3 ) |
| Most goals in a match | (Netherlands) Friendly match | SV de Lutte – AFC Ajax ( 0–18 ) |
| Most goals in a match | (Netherlands) KNVB Cup | Jong RKC – AFC Ajax ( 2–5 ) |
| Most goals in a match | (European Union) UEFA Champions League | F.C. København – AFC Ajax ( 1–2 ) |
| Most goals in a match | (European Union) UEFA Cup | IK Start – AFC Ajax ( 2–5 ) |
| Most goals in a match | (Netherlands) Eredivisie | AFC Ajax – Sparta Rotterdam ( 5–2 ) |

==== Top scorers ====
Friendlies

| Nr. | Name | Goal |
|---|---|---|
| 1. | (Netherlands) Klaas-Jan Huntelaar | 11 |
| 2. | (Greece) Angelos Charisteas | 9 |
| 3. | (Romania) Nicolae Mitea | 5 |
| 3. | (Netherlands) Rydell Poepon | 5 |
| 3. | (Argentina) Mauro Rosales | 5 |
| 6. | (Netherlands) Robbert Schilder | 4 |
| 7. | (Denmark) Kenneth Perez | 3 |
| 7. | (Netherlands) Jeffrey Sarpong | 3 |
| 7. | (Belgium) Tom De Mul | 3 |
| 10. | (Armenia) Edgar Manucharyan | 2 |
| 11. | (Netherlands) Olaf Lindenbergh | 1 |
| 11. | (Netherlands) Jaap Stam | 1 |
| 11. | (Netherlands) Wesley Sneijder | 1 |
| 11. | (Belgium) Thomas Vermaelen | 1 |
| 11. | (Belgium) Jan Vertonghen | 1 |
| 11. | (Netherlands) Ryan Babel | 1 |
| Total | | 56 |

Johan Cruijff Schaal

| Nr. | Name | Goal |
|---|---|---|
| 1. | (Argentina) Mauro Rosales | 1 |
| 1. | (Denmark) Kenneth Perez | 1 |
| 1. | (Netherlands) Wesley Sneijder | 1 |
| Total | | 3 |

Eredivisie

| Nr. | Name | Goal |
|---|---|---|
| 1. | (Netherlands) Klaas-Jan Huntelaar | 21 |
| 2. | (Netherlands) Wesley Sneijder | 18 |
| 3. | (Denmark) Kenneth Perez | 11 |
| 4. | (Netherlands) John Heitinga | 6 |
| 5. | (Netherlands) Ryan Babel | 5 |
| 5. | (Spain) Gabri | 5 |
| 7. | (Belgium) Tom De Mul | 3 |
| 8. | (Netherlands) Urby Emanuelson | 3 |
| 8. | (Czech Republic) Zdeněk Grygera | 3 |
| 10. | (Romania) Nicolae Mitea | 2 |
| 11. | (Argentina) Mauro Rosales | 1 |
| 11. | (Spain) Roger | 1 |
| 11. | (Netherlands) Jaap Stam | 1 |
| 11. | (Brazil) Leonardo | 1 |
| 11. | (Netherlands) Edgar Davids | 1 |
| Own goals | (Netherlands) Ryan Donk (AZ) | 1 |
| Total | | 83 |

KNVB Cup

| Nr. | Name | Goal |
|---|---|---|
| 1. | (Netherlands) Klaas-Jan Huntelaar | 4 |
| 2. | (Denmark) Kenneth Perez | 3 |
| 3. | (Sweden) Markus Rosenberg | 2 |
| 4. | (Netherlands) Hedwiges Maduro | 1 |
| 4. | (Netherlands) Jaap Stam | 1 |
| 4. | (Brazil) Leonardo | 1 |
| 4. | (Netherlands) John Heitinga | 1 |
| 4. | (Netherlands) Wesley Sneijder | 1 |
| 4. | (Spain) Gabri | 1 |
| 4. | (Romania) Nicolae Mitea | 1 |
| Own goals | (Suriname) Ray Fränkel (HFC Haarlem) | 1 |
| Total | | 17 |

UEFA Champions League

| Nr. | Name | Goal |
|---|---|---|
| 1. | (Netherlands) Klaas-Jan Huntelaar | 2 |
| Total | | 2 |

UEFA Cup

| Nr. | Name | Goal |
|---|---|---|
| 1. | (Netherlands) Klaas-Jan Huntelaar | 7 |
| 2. | (Sweden) Markus Rosenberg | 3 |
| 3. | (Netherlands) Ryan Babel | 2 |
| 4. | (Netherlands) Wesley Sneijder | 1 |
| 4. | (Spain) Gabri | 1 |
| 4. | (Czech Republic) Zdeněk Grygera | 1 |
| 4. | (Armenia) Edgar Manucharyan | 1 |
| 4. | (Netherlands) John Heitinga | 1 |
| 4. | (Brazil) Leonardo | 1 |
| Total | | 18 |

Amsterdam Tournament

| Nr. | Name | Goal |
|---|---|---|
| 1. | (Netherlands) Wesley Sneijder | 1 |
| Total | | 1 |

== Placements ==
| | Friendlies | Amsterdam Tournament | KNVB Cup | UEFA Champions League | UEFA Cup | Eredivisie |
|---|---|---|---|---|---|---|
| Status | 9 played, 6 wins, 0 draws, 3 losses | 4th place | Winners; Last opponent: AZ | Eliminated in Play-Off round Last opponent: Copenhagen | Eliminated in Round of 32; Last opponent: Werder Bremen | 2nd place 75 points in 34 matches qualified for UEFA Champions League Qualifying rounds |

- Wesley Sneijder is voted Player of the year by the supporters of AFC Ajax.
- Ryan Babel is voted Talent of the year by the supporters of AFC Ajax.

== Results ==
All times are in CEST

=== Johan Cruijff Schaal ===
| 13 August 2006 | PSV | 1–3 | Ajax | Amsterdam |
| 18:00 CET | Cocu 49' | | Rosales 7'; Perez 69'; Sneijder 82' | Stadium: Amsterdam Arena; Attendance: 35,000; Referee: René Temmink |

=== Eredivisie ===
| 20 August 2006 1 | Ajax | 5–0 | RKC Waalwijk | Amsterdam |
| 13:30 | Babel 33'; Sneijder 44', 69'; Heitinga 52'; Rosales 89' | Report | | Stadium: Amsterdam Arena; Attendance: 46.688; Referee: Reinold Wiedemeijer |

| 27 August 2006 2 | NAC Breda | 1–2 | Ajax | Breda |
| 13:30 | De Graaf 63' | Report | Sneijder 73', 84' | Stadium: Rat Verlegh Stadion; Attendance: 15.432; Referee: Jan Wegereef |

| 10 September 2006 3 | Ajax | 3–0 | Vitesse | Amsterdam |
| 13:30 | Huntelaar 32', 55'; Roger 46' | Report | Knol (red card) | Stadium: Amsterdam Arena; Attendance: 46.001; Referee: René Temmink |

| 17 September 2006 4 | Roda JC | 2–0 | Ajax | Kerkrade |
| 11:30 | De Fauw 9'; Oper 65' | Report | | Stadium: Parkstad Limburg; Attendance: 15.000; Referee: Frank de Bleeckere |

| 24 September 2006 5 | Ajax | 2–0 | N.E.C. | Amsterdam |
| 13:30 | Perez 60', 82' | Report | | Stadium: Amsterdam Arena; Attendance: 46.081; Referee: Bas Nijhuis |

| 1 October 2006 6 | FC Utrecht | 2–3 | Ajax | Utrecht |
| 11:30 | Van Dijk 80' (pen.), (yellow card) 84' (yellow-red card); Fortuné 85' | Report | Gabri 7'; Heitinga 45'; Perez 87' | Stadium: Stadion Galgenwaard; Attendance: 24.000; Referee: Dick van Egmond |

| 14 October 2006 7 | Ajax | 3–2 | Groningen | Amsterdam |
| 18:30 | Babel 51', 74'; Emanuelson 80' | Report | Levchenko 56' (pen.); Suárez 60' | Stadium: Amsterdam Arena; Attendance: 49.782; Referee: Eric Braamhaar |

| 22 October 2006 8 | Feyenoord | 0–4 | Ajax | Rotterdam |
| 11:30 | Van Hooijdonk (red card); Pardo (yellow card) 85' (yellow-red card) | Report | Huntelaar 12', 38'; Perez 50' (pen.), 62' | Stadium: Feyenoord Stadion; Attendance: 45.000; Referee: René Temmink |

| 25 October 2006 9 | Ajax | 2–0 | ADO Den Haag | Amsterdam |
| 19:30 | Gabri 30'; Sneijder 32' | Report | | Stadium: Amsterdam Arena; Attendance: 45.757; Referee: Jan Wegereef |

| 28 October 2006 10 | SC Heerenveen | 0–2 | Ajax | Heerenveen |
| 18:30 | | Report | De Mul 17'; Sneijder 76' | Stadium: Abe Lenstra Stadion; Attendance: 26.000; Referee: Kevin Blom |

| 5 November 2006 11 | Heracles Almelo | 0–3 | Ajax | Almelo |
| 13:30 | | Report | Perez 39', 82' (pen.); Heitinga (red card); Sneijder 87' | Stadium: Polman Stadion; Attendance: 8.500; Referee: Björn Kuipers |

| 12 November 2006 12 | Ajax | 0–1 | PSV | Amsterdam |
| 11:30 | | Report | Simons 63'; Méndez (yellow card) 71' (yellow-red card) | Stadium: Amsterdam Arena; Attendance: 50.496; Referee: Jan Wegereef |

| 19 November 2006 13 | Ajax | 1–1 | FC Twente | Amsterdam |
| 13:30 | Sneijder 48' | Report | Engelaar 8' | Stadium: Amsterdam Arena; Attendance: 49.364; Referee: Kevin Blom |

| 26 November 2006 14 | Sparta Rotterdam | 3–0 | Ajax | Rotterdam |
| 11:30 | Rose 35'; Polak 60' (pen.); Medunjanin 84' | Report | | Stadium: Het Kasteel; Attendance: 10.500; Referee: Ruud Bossen |

| 3 December 2006 15 | Ajax | 6–0 | Willem II | Amsterdam |
| 13:30 | Grygera 4'; Emanuelson 10'; Mitea 19'; Huntelaar 23', 45'; De Mul 78' | Report | Valencia (yellow card) 80' (yellow-red card) | Stadium: Amsterdam Arena; Attendance: 46.695; Referee: René Temmink |

| 10 December 2006 16 | Ajax | 2–2 | AZ | Amsterdam |
| 11:30 | Heitinga 35'; Huntelaar 75' | Report | Arveladze 51'; Mendes da Silva 57' | Stadium: Amsterdam Arena; Attendance: 50.649; Referee: Eric Braamhaar |

| 17 December 2006 17 | Excelsior | 1–3 | Ajax | Rotterdam |
| 11:30 | Van Nieuwstadt (yellow card) 36' (yellow-red card); Zijm (yellow card) 53' (yellow-red card); Piqué 90' | Report | Huntelaar 24', 48', 74' | Stadium: Stadion Woudestein; Attendance: 3.500; Referee: Bas Nijhuis |

| 24 December 2006 18 | Vitesse | 4–2 | Ajax | Arnhem |
| 11:30 | Lazović 49'; Junker 51'; Benson 89'; Hersi 90' | Report | Grygera 4'; De Mul 35'; Gabri (yellow card) 70' (yellow-red card) | Stadium: GelreDome; Attendance: 24.450; Referee: Pieter Vink |

| 27 December 2006 19 | Ajax | 2–0 | Roda JC | Amsterdam |
| 19:15 | Sneijder 15'; Grygera 41' | Report | | Stadium: Amsterdam Arena; Attendance: 50.334; Referee: Kevin Blom |

| 30 December 2006 20 | N.E.C. | 2–2 | Ajax | Nijmegen |
| 19:30 | Denneboom 76'; Wisgerhof 78' | Report | Perez 62'; Gabri 80' | Stadium: Stadion de Goffert; Attendance: 12.500; Referee: Roelof Luinge |

| 21 January 2007 21 | Ajax | 2–0 | FC Utrecht | Amsterdam |
| 12:30 | Heitinga 11'; Sneijder 21' | Report | | Stadium: Amsterdam Arena; Attendance: 44.740; Referee: Ruud Bossen |

| 28 January 2007 22 | Groningen | 2–3 | Ajax | Groningen |
| 13:30 | Levchenko 20' (pen.); Suárez 40' | Report | Stam 53'; Heitinga 82'; Leonardo 90' | Stadium: Euroborg; Attendance: 19.500; Referee: Jan Wegereef |

| 4 February 2007 23 | Ajax | 4–1 | Feyenoord | Amsterdam |
| 11:30 | Sneijder 20', 32', 87'; De Mul 34' | Report | Charisteas 42' | Stadium: Amsterdam Arena; Attendance: 50.490; Referee: Dick van Egmond |

| 11 February 2007 24 | ADO Den Haag | 1–2 | Ajax | The Hague |
| 12:30 | Kolk 20' | Report | Heitinga 58'; Huntelaar 70' | Stadium: Zuiderpark Stadion; Attendance: 8.276; Referee: Eric Braamhaar |

| 18 February 2007 25 | Ajax | 2–2 | Excelsior | Amsterdam |
| 13:30 | Davids 19'; Huntelaar 38' | Report | Slory 25'; Rojer 30' | Stadium: Amsterdam Arena; Attendance: 47.905; Referee: Pol van Boekel |

| 25 February 2007 26 | AZ | 1–1 | Ajax | Alkmaar |
| 11:30 | Martens 79' | Report | Davids (yellow card) 45' (yellow-red card); Perez 65' | Stadium: DSB Stadion; Attendance: 16.000; Referee: Jan Wegereef |

| 4 March 2007 27 | Ajax | 0–1 | SC Heerenveen | Amsterdam |
| 13:30 | | Report | Nilsson 18' | Stadium: Amsterdam Arena; Attendance: 50.174; Referee: Pieter Vink |

| 11 March 2007 28 | FC Twente | 1–4 | Ajax | Enschede |
| 13:30 | Nkufo 7' | Report | Huntelaar 21', 30', 75'; Babel 45' | Stadium: Arke Stadion; Attendance: 13.250; Referee: Frank de Bleeckere |

| 18 March 2007 29 | PSV | 1–5 | Ajax | Eindhoven |
| 13:30 | Kluivert 68' | Report | Huntelaar 17', 72'; Sneijder 44'; Gabri 73'; Perez 89' | Stadium: Philips Stadion; Attendance: 33.000; Referee: Eric Braamhaar |

| 1 April 2007 30 | Ajax | 3–0 | Heracles Almelo | Amsterdam |
| 13:30 | Sneijder 11'; Huntelaar 50', 52' | Report | | Stadium: Amsterdam Arena; Attendance: 50.109; Referee: Ben Haverkort |

| 8 April 2007 31 | RKC Waalwijk | 2–2 | Ajax | Waalwijk |
| 13:30 | Vertonghen 10'; Berger 71'; Sektioui (yellow card) 89' (yellow-red card) | Report | Gabri 9'; Sneijder 21' | Stadium: Mandemakers Stadion; Attendance: 7.500; Referee: Dick Jol |

| 13 April 2007 32 | Ajax | 2–0 | NAC Breda | Amsterdam |
| 19:30 | Perez 18' (pen.); Babel 64' | Report | | Stadium: Amsterdam Arena; Attendance: 49.737; Referee: Kevin Blom |

| 22 April 2007 33 | Ajax | 5–2 | Sparta Rotterdam | Amsterdam |
| 13:30 | Sneijder 9', 17'; Huntelaar 21'; Perez 76' (pen.); Mitea 82' | Report | Bouaouzan 37'; Moreno 47' | Stadium: Amsterdam Arena; Attendance: 50.364; Referee: Pieter Vink |

| 29 April 2007 34 | Willem II | 0–2 | Ajax | Tilburg |
| 13:30 | | | Emanuelson 19'; Huntelaar 69' | Stadium: Koning Willem II Stadion; Attendance: 14.000; Referee: Ben Haverkort |

=== Play-offs ===
Round 1

| 9 May 2007 1st Leg | SC Heerenveen | 1–0 | Ajax | Heerenveen |
| 19:00 | Nilsson 18' | Report | | Stadium: Abe Lenstra Stadion; Attendance: 23.500; Referee: Jack van Hulten |

| 13 May 2007 2nd Leg | Ajax | 4–0 (4–1 agg.) | SC Heerenveen | Amsterdam |
| 13:30 | Huntelaar 22', 61'; Babel 23'; Perez 86' | Report | Vandenbussche (yellow card) 59' (red card) | Stadium: Amsterdam Arena; Attendance: 29,241; Referee: Ruud Bossen |

Round 2

| 20 May 2007 1st Leg | AZ | 2–1 | Ajax | Alkmaar |
| 11:30 | Cziommer 2'; Arveladze 90' | Report | Sneijder 14' | Stadium: DSB Stadion; Attendance: 15.993; Referee: Roelof Luinge |

| 27 May 2007 2nd Leg | Ajax | 3–0 (4–2 agg.) | AZ | Amsterdam |
| 13:30 | Heitinga 55'; Donk 58' (o.g.); Gabri 90' | Report | | Stadium: Amsterdam Arena; Attendance: 50.201; Referee: Pieter Vink |

=== KNVB Cup ===
| 20 September 2006 2nd round | Jong RKC | 2–5 | Ajax | Waalwijk |
| 19:45 | Vink 2' (pen.); Fung-a-Wing 65' | Report | Rosenberg 21', 85'; Maduro 29'; Perez 48'; Huntelaar 57' | Stadium: Mandemakers Stadion; Attendance: 2.000; Referee: Pol van Boekel |

| 9 November 2006 3rd round | Ajax | 2–0 | ADO Den Haag | Amsterdam |
| 18:30 | Stam 8'; Huntelaar 65' | Report | | Stadium: Amsterdam Arena; Attendance: 7.909; Referee: Jack van Hulten |

| 24 January 2007 Round of 16 | Ajax | 4–0 | HFC Haarlem | Amsterdam |
| 18:30 | Fränkel 8' (o.g.); Leonardo 34'; Perez 40', 90' | | | Stadium: Amsterdam Arena; Attendance: 23.100; Referee: Bjorn Kuipers |

| 28 February 2007 Quarterfinals | Willem II | 0–2 | Ajax | Tilburg |
| 19:45 | | | Huntelaar 15'; Heitinga 81' | Stadium: Willem II Stadion; Attendance: 11.000; Referee: Dick van Egmond |

| 18 April 2007 Semifinals | Ajax | 3–1 | RKC Waalwijk | Amsterdam |
| 19:45 | Sneijder 12'; Gabri 66'; Mitea 88' | | Heitinga 32' (o.g.) | Stadium: Amsterdam Arena; Attendance: 34.600; Referee: Ruud Bossen |

| 6 May 2007 Final | AZ | 1–1 (8–9 p) | Ajax | Rotterdam |
| 19:45 | Dembélé 4'} | | Huntelaar 51'; Gabri (red card) | Stadium: Feyenoord Stadion; Attendance: 42.200; Referee: Dick van Egmond |

=== UEFA Champions League ===
Play-Off round

| 9 August 2006 1st Leg | FC København (Denmark) | 1–2 | (Netherlands) Ajax | Copenhagen, Denmark |
| 20:30 | Hangeland 47' | | Huntelaar 37', 84' | Stadium: Parken; Attendance: 40.000; Referee: Manuel Enrique Mejuto González (Spain) |

| 23 August 2006 2nd Leg | Ajax (Netherlands) | 0–2 (2–3 agg.) | (Denmark) FC København | Amsterdam |
| 20:30 | | | Silberbauer 59'; Vermaelen 77' (o.g.) | Stadium: Amsterdam Arena; Attendance: 35.600; Referee: Herbert Fandel (Germany) |

=== UEFA Cup ===
First round

| 14 September 2006 1st Leg | IK Start (Norway) | 2–5 | (Netherlands) Ajax | Lillestrøm, Norway |
| 17:15 | Johnsen 28'; Fevang 56' | Report | Huntelaar 18', 87'; Rosenberg 43'; Sneijder 63'; Roger 67' | Stadium: Åråsen Stadion; Attendance: 1.840; Referee: Grzegorz Gilewski (Poland) |

| 28 September 2006 2nd Leg | Ajax (Netherlands) | 4–0 (9–2 agg.) | (Norway) IK Start | Amsterdam |
| 19:45 | Rosenberg 6', 26'; Grygera 43'; Babel 68' | Report | | Stadium: Amsterdam Arena; Attendance: 23.500; Referee: Darko Ceferin (Slovenia) |

==== Group stage ====
| Pos | Team | Pld | W | D | L | GF | GA | GD | Pts | Qualification | ESP | AJX | ZWA | PRA | AUS |
|---|---|---|---|---|---|---|---|---|---|---|---|---|---|---|---|
| 1 | (Spain) Espanyol | 4 | 4 | 0 | 0 | 11 | 2 | +9 | 12 | Advance to knockout stage | — | — | 6–2 | — | 1–0 |
| 2 | (Netherlands) Ajax | 4 | 2 | 1 | 1 | 6 | 2 | +4 | 7 | Advance to knockout stage | 0–2 | — | — | — | 3–0 |
| 3 | (Belgium) Zulte Waregem | 4 | 2 | 0 | 2 | 9 | 11 | −2 | 6 | Advance to knockout stage | — | 0–3 | — | 3–1 | — |
| 4 | (Czech Republic) Sparta Prague | 4 | 1 | 1 | 2 | 2 | 5 | −3 | 4 | | 0–2 | 0–0 | — | — | — |
| 5 | Austria Wien | 4 | 0 | 0 | 4 | 1 | 9 | −8 | 0 | | — | — | 1–4 | 0–1 | — |

| 2 November 2006 1 | Ajax (Netherlands) | 3–0 | Austria Wien | Amsterdam |
| 19:45 | Huntelaar 35', 68'; Manucharyan 65' | Report | | Stadium: Amsterdam Arena; Attendance: 32,285; Referee: Sorin Corpodean (Romania) |

| 23 November 2006 2 | Sparta Praha (Czech Republic) | 0–0 | (Netherlands) Ajax | Prague, Czech Republic |
| 17:30 | | Report | | Stadium: Juliska; Attendance: 12.230; Referee: Hervé Piccirillo (France) |

| 30 November 2006 3 | Ajax (Netherlands) | 0–2 | (Spain) Espanyol | Amsterdam |
| 20:45 | | Report | Pandiani 36'; Coro 78' | Stadium: Amsterdam Arena; Attendance: 41,248; Referee: Paolo Bertini (Italy) |

| 13 December 2006 4 | Zulte Waregem (Belgium) | 0–3 | (Netherlands) Ajax | Gent, Belgium |
| 19:45 | | Report | Huntelaar 4', 56'; Heitinga 83' | Stadium: Jules Ottenstadion; Attendance: 11.603; Referee: Edo Trivkovic (Croatia) |

==== Final phase ====
===== Round of 32 =====
| 14 February 2007 1st Leg | Werder Bremen (Germany) | 3–0 | (Netherlands) Ajax | Bremen, Germany |
| 19:30 | Mertesacker 48'; Naldo 54'; Frings 71' | | | Stadium: Weserstadion; Attendance: 38.146; Referee: Paulo Baptista (Portugal) |

| 22 February 2007 2nd Leg | Ajax (Netherlands) | 3–1 (3–4 agg.) | (Germany) Werder Bremen | Amsterdam |
| 20:00 | Leonardo 3'; Huntelaar 60'; Babel 74' | | Almeida 13' | Stadium: Amsterdam Arena; Attendance: 35.000; Referee: Howard Webb (England) |

=== Amsterdam Tournament ===
| 4 August 2006 | AFC Ajax (Netherlands) | 1–1 | (Italy) Internazionale | Amsterdam |
| 21:15 | Sneijder 87' | Report | Solari 19' | Stadium: Amsterdam Arena; Attendance: 22,000; Referee: Jan Wegereef |

| 5 August 2006 | AFC Ajax (Netherlands) | 0–1 | (England) Manchester United | Amsterdam |
| 21:15 | | Report | Giggs 77' | Stadium: Amsterdam Arena; Attendance: 44,000; Referee: Pieter Vink |

Final standings of the LG Amsterdam Tournament 2006

| Team | Pld | W | D | L | GF | Pts |
|---|---|---|---|---|---|---|
| (England) Manchester United | 2 | 2 | 0 | 0 | 4 | 10 |
| (Italy) Internazionale | 2 | 1 | 1 | 0 | 4 | 8 |
| (Portugal) Porto | 2 | 0 | 0 | 2 | 3 | 3 |
| (Netherlands) Ajax | 2 | 0 | 1 | 1 | 1 | 2 |

=== Friendlies ===
| 8 July 2006 | JOS Watergraafsmeer (Netherlands) | 1–5 | (Netherlands) Ajax | Amsterdam, Netherlands |
| 15:00 | Blankendaal 71' | Report | Mitea 10', 77'; Huntelaar 25'; Poepon 69'; Charisteas 74' | Stadium: Sportpark Drie Burg; Attendance: - Referee: - |

| 11 July 2006 | ABS (Netherlands) | 0–11 | (Netherlands) Ajax | Bathmen, Netherlands |
| 19:30 | | Report | Huntelaar 9' (pen.), 17', 20'; Rosales 53', 56'; Charisteas 68', 73', 81'; Mitea 83'; Lindenbergh 84'; Sarpong 88' | Stadium: Sportpark de Looënk; Attendance: - Referee: René Temmink |

| 12 July 2006 | SV de Lutte (Netherlands) | 0–18 | (Netherlands) Ajax | Oldenzaal, Netherlands |
| 19:30 | | Report | Perez 8', 11', 15'; Poepon 18', 42', 45'; De Mul 32'; Schilder 35', 62'; Charisteas 52', 55', 78', 87'; Manucharyan 54'; Mitea 57', 90'; Sarpong 59'; Rosales 72' | Stadium: Sportpark de Vondersweijde; Attendance: 4,000; Referee: Luuk Hoopman |

| 13 July 2006 | HHC Hardenberg (Netherlands) | 0–4 | (Netherlands) Ajax | Hardenberg, Netherlands |
| 19:30 | | Report | Manucharyan 14'; Huntelaar 37' (pen.), 51', 66' | Stadium: De Adelaarshorst; Attendance: 4,500; Referee: - |

| 15 July 2006 | VV Bennekom (Netherlands) | 0–8 | (Netherlands) Ajax | Bennekom, Netherlands |
| 15:00 | | Report | De Mul 7'; Stam 25'; Charisteas 34'; Rosales 55'; Poepon 62'; Huntelaar 78', 80'; Sarpong 90' | Stadium: Sportpark Eikelhof; Attendance: 4,500; Referee: Dennis van Aken |

| 18 July 2006 | SV Spakenburg (Netherlands) | 3–2 | (Netherlands) Ajax | Spakenburg, Netherlands |
| 19:30 | Van Metelen 31'; De Harder 37'; Aksit 84' | Report | De Mul 58'; Schilder 94' | Stadium: Sportpark de Westmaat; Attendance: 5.979; Referee: Lex Stofkooper |

| 25 July 2006 | FC Emmen (Netherlands) | 0–6 | (Netherlands) Ajax | Veenoord, Netherlands |
| 19:30 | | Report | Rosales 5'; Sneijder 15'; Vermaelen 37'; Schilder 45'; Vertonghen 66'; Huntelaar 87' | Stadium: Sportpark Veenoord; Attendance: 6,000; Referee: Ben Haverkort |

| 29 July 2006 | Borussia Dortmund (Germany) | 2–1 | (Netherlands) Ajax | Lüdenscheid, Germany |
| 14:00 | Kringe 71'; Kruska 80' (pen.) | Report | Huntelaar 31' | Stadium: Nattenbergstadion; Attendance: 10,334; Referee: Philipp Metzger |

| 14 January 2007 | Ajax Cape Town (South Africa) | 3–1 | (Netherlands) Ajax | Cape Town, South Africa |
| 15:00 | Scott 47', 50'; Paulse 51' | Report | Babel 15' | Stadium: Athlone Stadium; Attendance: - Referee: - |

== Transfers for 2006–07 ==
=== Summer transfer window ===
For a list of all Dutch football transfers in the summer window (1 July 2006 to 1 September 2006) please see List of Dutch football transfers summer 2006.

==== Arrivals ====
- The following players moved to AFC Ajax.

| | Name | Position | Transfer type | Previous club | Fee |
| | Return from loan spell | | | | |
|---|---|---|---|---|---|
| Substituted on | (Belgium) Stanley Aborah | Midfielder | 1 July 2006 | (Netherlands) FC Den Bosch | - |
| | Transfer | | | | |
| Substituted on | (Romania) George Ogăraru | Defender | 23 May 2006 | (Romania) Steaua București | €3.3 million |
| Substituted on | (Denmark) Kenneth Perez | Defender | 1 July 2006 | (Netherlands) AZ | €3 million |
| Substituted on | (Netherlands) Jaap Stam | Defender | 12 July 2006 | (Italy) Milan | €3 million |
| | Free Transfer | | | | |
| Substituted on | (Denmark) Michael Krohn-Dehli | Midfielder | 1 July 2006 | (Netherlands) RKC Waalwijk | - |
| Substituted on | (Netherlands) Dennis Gentenaar | Goalkeeper | 1 July 2006 | (Germany) Borussia Dortmund | - |
| Substituted on | (Spain) Gabri | Midfielder | 6 June 2006 | (Spain) Barcelona | - |
| Substituted on | (Spain) Roger | Midfielder | 12 August 2006 | (Spain) Villarreal | - |

==== Departures ====
- The following players moved from AFC Ajax.

| | Name | Position | Transfer type | New club | Fee |
| | Out on loan | | | | |
|---|---|---|---|---|---|
| Substituted off | (Netherlands) Victor Sikora | Midfielder | 1 July 2006 | (Netherlands) NAC Breda | - |
| Substituted off | (Netherlands) Robbert Schilder | Midfielder | 7 August 2006 | (Netherlands) Heracles Almelo | - |
| Substituted off | (Ghana) Emmanuel Boakye | Defender | 10 August 2006 | (Netherlands) Heracles Almelo | - |
| Substituted off | (Netherlands) Tom Kalkhuis | Forward | 31 August 2006 | (Netherlands) FC Omniworld | - |
| | Loan return | | | | |
| Substituted off | (Spain) Juanfran | Defender | 1 July 2006 | (Turkey) Beşiktaş | - |
| | Transfer | | | | |
| Substituted off | (Sweden) Rasmus Lindgren | Midfielder | 1 March 2006 | (Netherlands) Groningen | €300,000 |
| Substituted off | (Belgium) Gideon De Graaf | Forward | 1 July 2006 | (Belgium) Mechelen | €2.8 million |
| Substituted off | (Greece) Angelos Charisteas | Forward | 31 August 2006 | (Netherlands) Feyenoord | €2.6 million |
| | Free Transfer | | | | |
| Substituted off | (Morocco) Nourdin Boukhari | Midfielder | 15 May 2006 | (France) FC Nantes | - |
| Substituted off | (Czech Republic) Tomáš Galásek | Defender | 1 July 2006 | (Germany) 1. FC Nürnberg | - |
| Substituted off | (South Africa) Steven Pienaar | Midfielder | 1 July 2006 | (Germany) Borussia Dortmund | - |
| Substituted off | (South Africa) Hans Vonk | Goalkeeper | 1 July 2006 | (South Africa) Ajax Cape Town | - |
| Substituted off | (Greece) Ioannis Anastasiou | Forward | 1 July 2006 | (Netherlands) Sparta Rotterdam | - |
| Substituted off | (Tunisia) Hatem Trabelsi | Defender | 10 August 2006 | (England) Manchester City | - |

=== Winter transfer window ===
For a list of all Dutch football transfers in the winter window (1 January 2007 to 1 February 2007) please see List of Dutch football transfers winter 2006–07.

==== Arrivals ====
- The following players moved to AFC Ajax.

| | Name | Position | Transfer type | Previous club | Fee |
| | Transfer | | | | |
|---|---|---|---|---|---|
| Substituted on | (Brazil) Leonardo | Forward | 19 December 2006 | (Netherlands) NAC Breda | €660,000 |
| | Free Transfer | | | | |
| Substituted on | (Netherlands) Edgar Davids | Midfielder | 30 January 2006 | (England) Tottenham Hotspur | - |

==== Departures ====
- The following players moved from AFC Ajax.

| | Name | Position | Transfer type | New club | Fee |
| | Out on loan | | | | |
|---|---|---|---|---|---|
| Substituted off | (Netherlands) Derk Boerrigter | Forward | 30 January 2007 | (Netherlands) HFC Haarlem | - |
| Substituted off | (Denmark) Michael Krohn-Dehli | Midfielder | 31 January 2007 | (Netherlands) Sparta Rotterdam | - |
| Substituted off | (Belgium) Jan Vertonghen | Defender | 31 January 2007 | (Netherlands) RKC Waalwijk | - |
| Substituted off | (Netherlands) Rydell Poepon | Forward | 31 January 2007 | (Netherlands) Willem II | - |
| Substituted off | (Netherlands) Donovan Slijngard | Midfielder | 31 January 2007 | (Netherlands) Groningen | - |
| | Transfer | | | | |
| Substituted off | (Sweden) Markus Rosenberg | Forward | 27 January 2007 | (Germany) Werder Bremen | €3.3 million |
| Substituted off | (Argentina) Mauro Rosales | Forward | 31 January 2007 | (Argentina) River Plate | €1.8 million |
| | Free Transfer | | | | |
| Substituted off | (Belgium) Stanley Aborah | Midfielder | 6 January 2007 | (Belgium) FCV Dender | - |
