= 2006 Johan Cruyff Shield =

Johan Cruijff Schaal XI
Ajax	PSV Eindhoven
3	1
- Date: 13 August 2006
- Venue: Amsterdam Arena, Amsterdam
- Referee: René Temmink
- Attendance: 35,000

The eleventh edition of the Johan Cruyff Shield (Dutch: Johan Cruijff Schaal) was held on 13 August 2006 between 2005–06 Eredivisie champions PSV Eindhoven and 2005–06 KNVB Cup winners Ajax. Ajax won the match 3–1.

== Match details ==
13 August 2006

Ajax	3–1	PSV Eindhoven
Rosales 7'; Perez 69'; Sneijder 82'	Report	Cocu 48'

Amsterdam Arena, Amsterdam
Attendance: 35,000
Referee: René Temmink

Ajax	PSV Eindhoven

GK	1	(Netherlands) Maarten Stekelenburg
RB	20	(Romania) George Ogăraru		(substituted off) 46'
CB	3	(Netherlands) Jaap Stam (c)
CB	4	(Belgium) Thomas Vermaelen
LB	5	(Netherlands) Urby Emanuelson
CM	18	(Spain) Gabri
CM	24	(Netherlands) Robbert Schilder		(substituted off) 46'
AM	10	(Netherlands) Wesley Sneijder
RW	7	(Argentina) Mauro Rosales
CF	19	(Sweden) Markus Rosenberg
LW	8	(Netherlands) Ryan Babel		(substituted off) 68'
Substitutes:
GK	30	(Netherlands) Dennis Gentenaar
DF	2	(Netherlands) John Heitinga		(substituted in) 46'
DF	22	(Czech Republic) Zdeněk Grygera
MF	15	(Netherlands) Olaf Lindenbergh
MF	6	(Netherlands) Hedwiges Maduro	(yellow card) 73'	(substituted in) 46'
FW	11	(Denmark) Kenneth Perez		(substituted in) 68'
FW	16	(Belgium) Tom De Mul
Manager:
(Netherlands) Henk ten Cate

GK	21	(Netherlands) Oscar Moens
RB	19	(Netherlands) Michael Lamey
CB	4	(Brazil) Alex
CB	6	(Belgium) Timmy Simons	(yellow card) 45'
LB	23	(Mexico) Carlos Salcido
DM	8	(Netherlands) Phillip Cocu (c)	(yellow card) 51'	(substituted off) 78'
CM	7	(Finland) Mika Väyrynen		(substituted off) 70'
CM	16	(Netherlands) Ismaïl Aissati		(substituted off) 82'
RW	17	(Peru) Jefferson Farfán
CF	9	(Netherlands) Jan Vennegoor of Hesselink
LW	10	(Ivory Coast) Arouna Koné
Substitutes:
MF	22	(Hungary) Csaba Fehér		(substituted in) 70'
MF	18	(Ghana) Eric Addo		(substituted in) 78'
MF	24	(United States) Lee Nguyen		(substituted in) 82'
Manager:
(Netherlands) Ronald Koeman
