= 2007 Johan Cruyff Shield =

Johan Cruijff Schaal XII
Ajax	PSV Eindhoven
1	0
- Date: 11 August 2007
- Venue: Amsterdam Arena, Amsterdam
- Man of the Match: Gabri (Ajax)
- Referee: Ruud Bossen
- Attendance: 45,000

The twelfth edition of the Johan Cruyff Shield (Dutch: Johan Cruijff Schaal) was held on 11 August 2007 between 2006–07 Eredivisie champions PSV Eindhoven and 2006–07 KNVB Cup winners Ajax. Ajax won the match 1–0.

== Match details ==
11 August 2007

Ajax	1–0	PSV Eindhoven
Gabri 43'	Report

Amsterdam Arena, Amsterdam
Attendance: 45,000
Referee: Ruud Bossen

Ajax	PSV Eindhoven

GK	1	(Netherlands) Maarten Stekelenburg
RB	2	(Netherlands) John Heitinga	(yellow card) 83'
CB	3	(Netherlands) Jaap Stam (c)		(substituted off) 46'
CB	31	(Netherlands) Jürgen Colin
LB	4	(Belgium) Thomas Vermaelen
DM	18	(Spain) Gabri
RM	20	(Romania) George Ogăraru		(substituted off) 25'
CM	5	(Netherlands) Urby Emanuelson
LM	7	(Sweden) Kennedy Bakırcıoğlu		(substituted off) 81'
SS	19	(Denmark) Dennis Rommedahl
CF	9	(Netherlands) Klaas-Jan Huntelaar
Substitutes:
GK	30	(Netherlands) Dennis Gentenaar
DF	25	(Netherlands) Gregory van der Wiel		(substituted on) 25'
MF	6	(Netherlands) Hedwiges Maduro		(substituted on) 81'
MF	24	(Netherlands) Mitchell Donald	(yellow card) 77'	(substituted on) 46'
MF	26	(Netherlands) Jeffrey Sarpong
MF	27	(Netherlands) Vurnon Anita
MF	34	(Netherlands) John Goossens
Manager:
(Netherlands) Henk ten Cate

GK	1	(Brazil) Heurelho Gomes
RB	2	(Netherlands) Jan Kromkamp		(substituted off) 46'
CB	18	(Ghana) Eric Addo
CB	3	(Mexico) Carlos Salcido
LB	5	(Netherlands) Mike Zonneveld
DM	6	(Belgium) Timmy Simons (c)
RM	16	(Netherlands) Ismaïl Aissati	(yellow card) 83'
CM	28	(Netherlands) Otman Bakkal
CM	20	(Netherlands) Ibrahim Afellay
LM	8	(Ecuador) Édison Méndez		(substituted off) 59'
CF	19	(Brazil) Jonathan Reis		(substituted off) 73'
Substitutes:
GK	21	(Netherlands) Bas Roorda
DF	4	(Portugal) Manuel da Costa
DF	13	(Brazil) Alcides		(substituted on) 46'
MF	15	(Australia) Jason Culina		(substituted on) 59'
MF	25	(Netherlands) John de Jong
MF	26	(Netherlands) Tommie van der Leegte
FW	29	(Netherlands) Género Zeefuik		(substituted on) 73'
Manager:
(Netherlands) Ronald Koeman

Match officials:

- Assistant referees:
  - Adriaan Inia
  - Hans Olde Olthof
- Fourth official:
  - Pol van Boekel

Man of the Match:

- Gabri (Ajax)
