= Thomas Vermaelen =

Belgian footballer (born 1985)

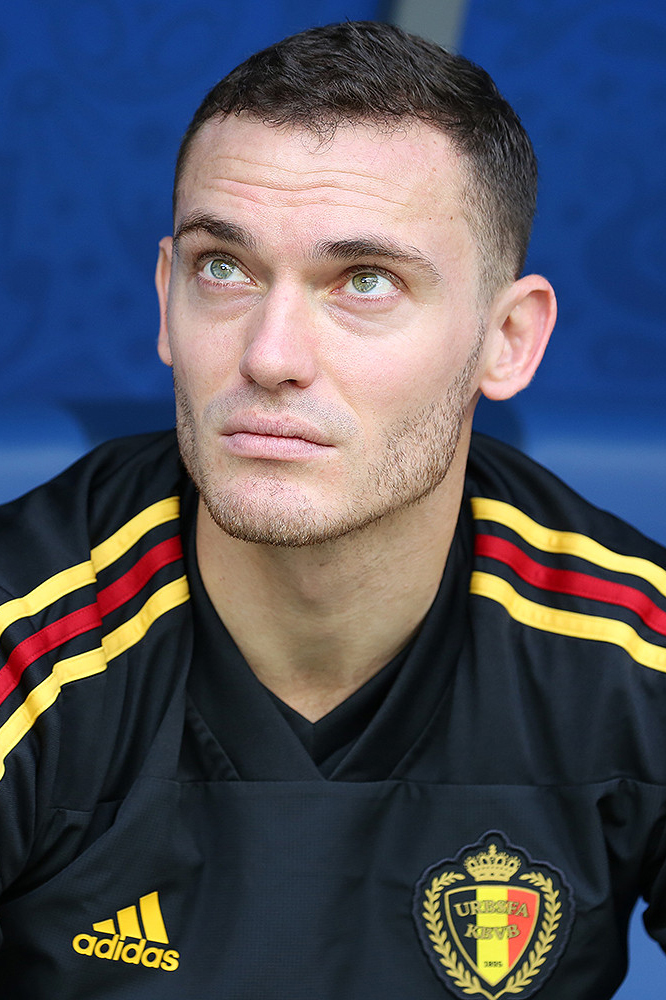
- Vermaelen with Belgium at the 2018 FIFA World Cup

Personal information
- Full name: Thomas Vermaelen
- Date of birth: 14 November 1985 (age 41)
- Place of birth: Kapellen, Belgium
- Height: 1.83 m (6 ft 0 in)
- Positions: Centre-back; left-back

Youth career
- 1991–1999: Germinal Ekeren
- 1999–2000: Germinal Beerschot
- 2000–2003: Ajax

Senior career*
Years	Team	Apps	(Gls)
2003–2009	Ajax	97	(7)
2003–2005	→ RKC Waalwijk (loan)	13	(2)
2009–2014	Arsenal	110	(13)
2014–2019	Barcelona	34	(1)
2016–2017	→ Roma (loan)	9	(0)
2019–2021	Vissel Kobe	45	(1)
Total		308	(24)

International career
2002–2003	Belgium U18	5	(0)
2003–2004	Belgium U19	7	(0)
2004–2007	Belgium U21	12	(1)
2006–2021	Belgium	85	(2)

Managerial career
- 2022: Belgium (assistant)
Medal record
Men's football
Representing Belgium
FIFA World Cup
Third place	2018 Russia
- * Club domestic league appearances and goals

Thomas Vermaelen (Dutch pronunciation: [ˈtoːmɑs fərˈmaːlə(n)]; born 14 November 1985) is a Belgian former professional footballer who played as a defender. Being left-footed, he usually played as a left-sided centre-back and could play at left-back as well. His key attributes included aerial ability, leadership skills, and his quickness with the ball at his feet. He was also known for his goalscoring ability as a defender.

Vermaelen joined the Ajax youth academy in 2000 and won the 2003–04 Eredivisie title in his first season with the club. He had a loan spell with RKC Waalwijk before rejoining Ajax and winning the KNVB Cup and Johan Cruyff Shield. After Klaas-Jan Huntelaar's departure in 2009, he served as club captain for the remainder of the season. He joined Arsenal in 2009 and was included in the PFA Premier League Team of the Year for that season. Following Robin van Persie's transfer to Manchester United in August 2012, he was named club captain but found first team opportunities limited due to the success of Arsenal's new first-choice defensive partnership of Per Mertesacker and Laurent Koscielny. In August 2014, he completed a £15 million transfer to Barcelona in La Liga. In 2019, he joined Vissel Kobe before retiring in 2021.

Vermaelen made his international debut for Belgium in 2006, and took part at the 2008 Olympics, where Belgium came fourth, as well as the FIFA World Cup in 2014 and 2018 (where Belgium came third), and the UEFA European Championship in 2016 and 2021.

== Club career ==
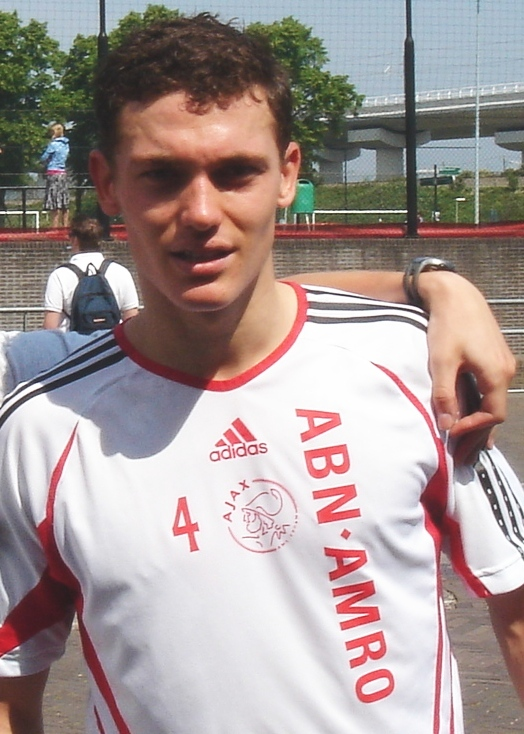
Vermaelen with Ajax from 2000 to 2009

=== Early career ===
Born in Kapellen, Belgium, Vermaelen started his youth career in his home country with Germinal Ekeren, which later became Germinal Beerschot after a merger.

=== Ajax ===
Vermaelen joined the academy of Dutch club Ajax. He made his professional debut on 15 February 2004 in a 0–2 away win over FC Volendam.

His breakthrough came when he returned to Ajax and won the KNVB Cup. Performances that season resulted in a call-up to the Belgium national football team. Ajax won the Johan Cruyff Shield and another KNVB Cup the following season and in 2007, they won the Johan Cruyff Shield for the second consecutive time. He forged a partnership with fellow academy graduate John Heitinga and later Jan Vertonghen when Heitinga left for Atlético Madrid in Spain. Following the departure of Klaas-Jan Huntelaar in mid-season, Vermaelen served as captain of Ajax for the remainder of the 2008–09 season, where he mostly played as a left-back.

=== Arsenal ===
==== 2009–10 season ====
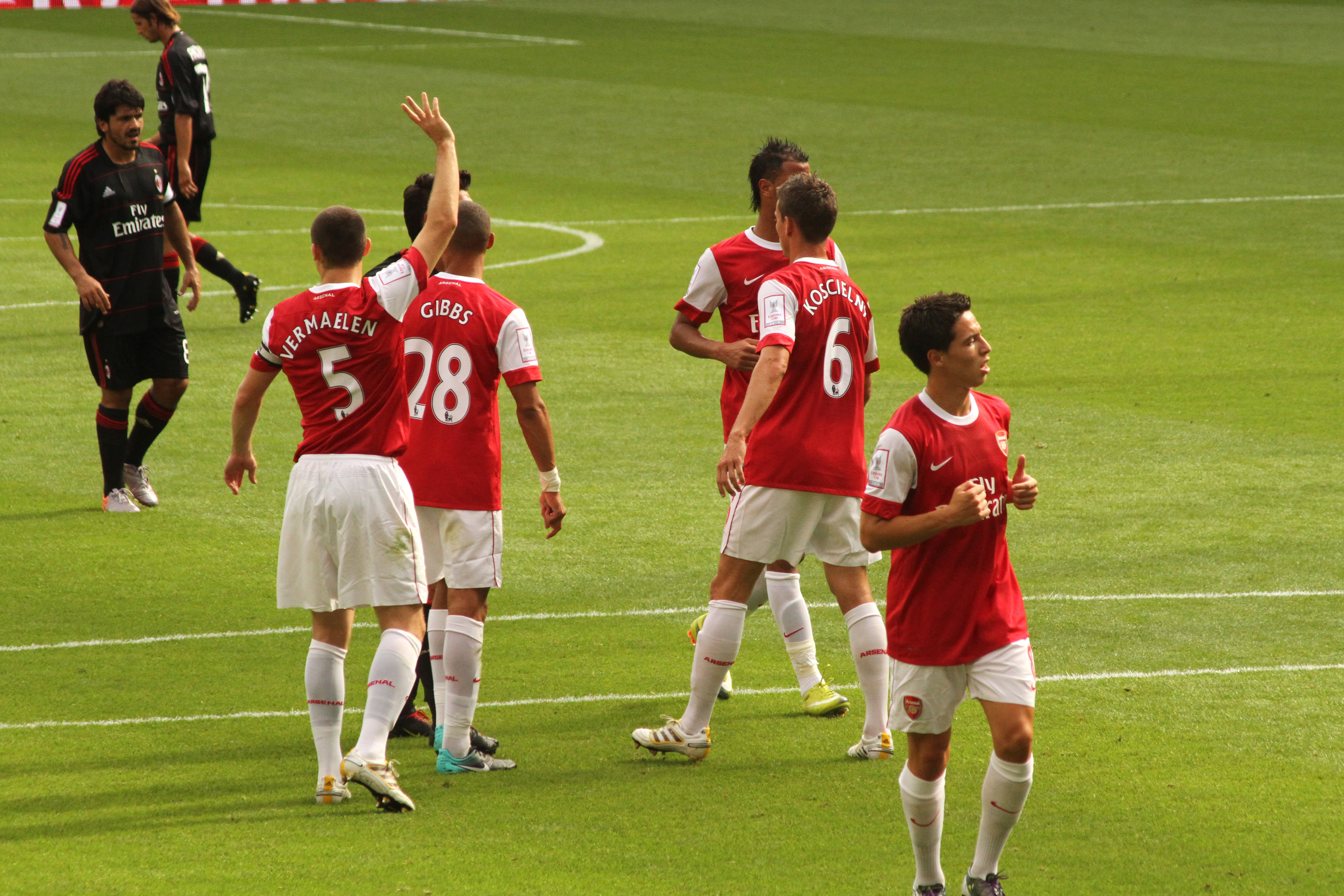
Vermaelen (left) with Arsenal in 2010

Vermaelen joined Arsenal from Ajax for an initial fee of €10 million (rising to €12 million) on 19 June 2009, signing a four-year contract. After Kolo Touré surrendered the number 5 jersey to him upon joining Manchester City, Vermaelen, with William Gallas, formed Arsenal's central defence pairing. Vermaelen made his Premier League debut on 15 August 2009 in a 1–6 away win against Everton, and scored in the 37th minute. He became the 84th Arsenal player to score in their debut. He then scored a brace against Wigan Athletic in a 4–0 victory.

Arsenal fans voted him as their Player of the Month twice in a row on Arsenal.com, and affectionately nicknamed him the "Verminator". However, he scored an own goal in a home match against Chelsea when a cross came in from Ashley Cole. The match finished 0–3 to Chelsea at the Emirates Stadium.

Vermaelen became notable for being a goal-scoring defender during the first half of Arsenal's 2009–10 season. In recognition of his contributions, he was nominated for the Belgian Sportsman of the year award and was also included in the PFA Team of the Season. Vermaelen finished the season with 45 games and eight goals in all competitions under his belt.

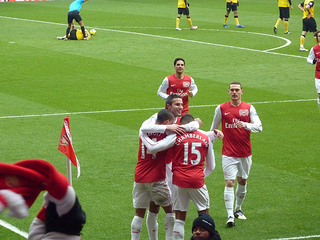
Vermaelen and teammates after Alex Oxlade-Chamberlain scores

==== 2010–11 season ====
In the pre-season of the 2010–11 season, Vermaelen captained Arsenal in an Emirates Cup match against Milan with regular captain Cesc Fàbregas and vice-captains Manuel Almunia and Robin van Persie not in the squad. Vermaelen started all of the first three Arsenal matches of the season before suffering an Achilles tendon injury on international duty with Belgium.

He had a new injury setback when manager Arsène Wenger reported that the Achilles tendon problem would keep him out of action for an unforeseeable time. On 17 March 2011, Wenger confirmed that Vermaelen would miss the remainder of the season with a new injury setback, but on 26 April, Vermaelen played 90 minutes in his first competitive game after eight months in a reserves game against Manchester United at Old Trafford on 28 April. On 8 May, he was included in Arsenal's 18-man squad travelling to Stoke City at the Britannia Stadium. However, Vermaelen was an unused substitute, but on 15 May, he finally returned in Arsenal's 2–1 defeat to Aston Villa and played the full 90 minutes.

==== 2011–12 season ====
Following Cesc Fàbregas' transfer to Barcelona in August 2011, Vermaelen was named vice-captain of Arsenal, with Robin van Persie named captain. On 6 September 2011, Vermaelen had treatment on his Achilles tendon which ruled him out for six weeks. On 18 October 2011, he signed a contract extension to keep him at the club for an additional four years. He made his long-awaited return against Bolton Wanderers in the fourth round of the League Cup, where he captained the side to a 2–1 victory at the Emirates Stadium. He suffered a suspected calf injury in the 84th minute, but to Arsenal's relief, he stated in the post-match interview it was just a cramp. On 1 November, Vermaelen started his first UEFA Champions League game in three months against Marseille and played a key role in helping keep a clean sheet for the Gunners in which the game ended 0–0.

Vermaelen scored Arsenal's second goal in their 3–0 win over West Bromwich Albion on 5 November. He also featured in the 1–1 draw with Fulham on 26 November, when he scored a 65th minute own-goal but salvaged a point with an 82nd-minute equaliser for Arsenal. On 3 December, Vermaelen scored the second goal against Wigan to win the match 4–0. On 12 March 2012, Vermaelen scored the winner in the 95th minute against Newcastle United. He had run the entire length of the pitch to score a half-volley from Theo Walcott's cross. In the following game, he converted a Robin van Persie corner, heading home Arsenal's only goal in a 0–1 victory over Everton at Goodison Park. On 16 April 2012, he headed home a Tomáš Rosický cross against Wigan to reduce the deficit to 1–2, with Wigan having taken a two-goal lead at the Emirates. However, the scoreline finished the same. Manager Arsène Wenger has called him a defensive rock and his partnership with Laurent Koscielny is strong, enabling Arsenal to build from the back.

==== 2012–13 season ====
In August 2012, Vermaelen was announced as Arsenal's new captain, replacing Robin van Persie upon his departure to Manchester United.

On 11 December 2012, Vermaelen missed the deciding penalty kick in Arsenal's shoot-out defeat against League Two side Bradford City in the League Cup, his shot striking the post. Vermaelen had scored Arsenal's equalising goal within normal time of the same match. However, consistently poor performances followed for Vermaelen, most notably against Manchester City and Liverpool.

Vermaelen's performances forced Arsène Wenger to drop him for the pivotal Champions League game against Bayern Munich at the Allianz Arena. Arsenal won 0–2, although it was not enough to progress to the next round through aggregate, but they were the first team to prevent Bayern from scoring that season, thanks to an assured performance from the defence and reserve goalkeeper Łukasz Fabiański. Per Mertesacker and Laurent Koscielny continued to partner each other at centre-back for the following games, until the former's red card against West Brom at The Hawthorns on 6 April 2013 gave Vermaelen a chance to reestablish himself in the team. Arsenal held on for a 1–2 win. Due to Mertesacker's suspension, Vermaelen partnered Koscielny for the game against Norwich City on 13 April, with Arsenal winning 3–1.

==== 2013–14 season ====
On 17 May 2014, Vermaelen won his only trophy with Arsenal as an unused substitute in the team's 3–2 win over Hull City in the 2014 FA Cup Final.

=== Barcelona ===
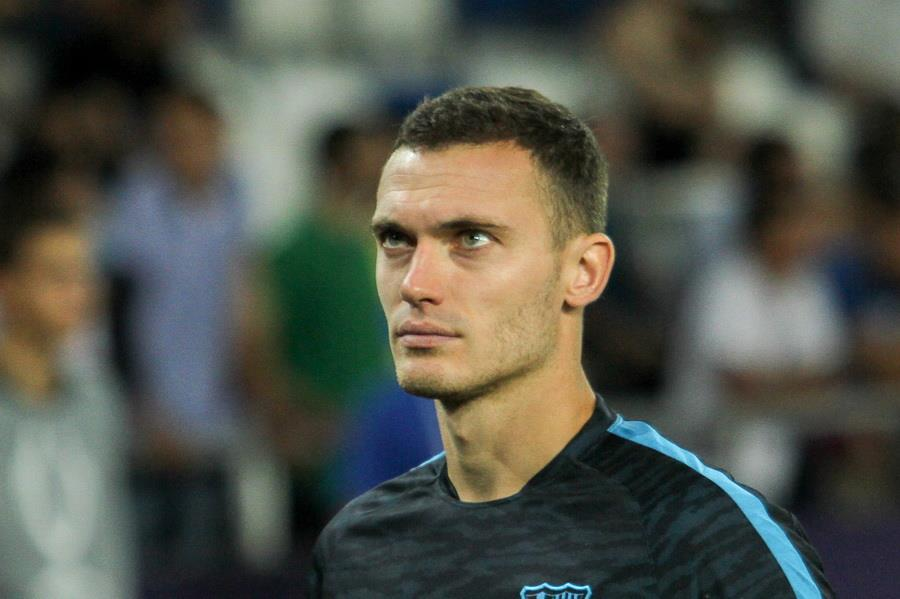
Vermaelen with Barcelona in 2015

On 9 August 2014, Arsenal accepted a £15 million offer from Barcelona for Vermaelen. The next day, he completed his move after signing a five-year contract. Vermaelen was plagued with injuries since his transfer; he was thought to be ready for Barcelona's game against APOEL in the Champions League, but was taken out of the squad. He underwent surgery on 2 December 2014 for a recurring hamstring injury, and was expected back in four-to-six months. After being an unused substitute in a 2–0 win over Real Sociedad two weeks earlier, Vermaelen started on his debut for Barcelona on 23 May 2015 in the final La Liga match of the season against Deportivo de La Coruña in which he played for 63 minutes before being substituted for Douglas in a 2–2 draw at the Camp Nou.

In the second game of his second season on 29 August 2015, Vermaelen scored his first goal for Barcelona, finishing from a cross to win a home match against Málaga. He was praised by manager Luis Enrique afterwards. Vermaelen was an 81st-minute substitute for Javier Mascherano on 20 December as Barcelona won the 2015 FIFA Club World Cup Final against River Plate in Japan.

==== Loan to Roma ====
On 8 August 2016, Roma loaned Vermaelen from Barcelona on a one-year deal with an option to purchase. On 18 August 2016, Vermaelen made his debut for the Rome club in a UEFA Champions League qualification play-off against FC Porto and was sent off for two yellow card offences after only 41 minutes.

During his time at the club, Vermaelen played only 607 minutes due to injury and returned to Barcelona at the end of the season.

==== Return to Barcelona ====
On 26 November 2017, Vermaelen was selected to start in Barcelona's 1–1 draw with Valencia at the Mestalla Stadium, covering for the suspended Gerard Piqué. He retained his place in central defence for seven of the next eight fixtures, before picking up an injury, including Barça's 3–0 win at the Santiago Bernabéu Stadium against rivals Real Madrid.

=== Vissel Kobe ===
On 27 July 2019, Vermaelen signed a two-and-a-half-year contract with J1 League side Vissel Kobe. At the club, he rejoined former Barcelona teammates Andrés Iniesta and Sergi Samper, and former Arsenal teammate Lukas Podolski. On 1 January 2020, Vermaelen won his first trophy in Japan, starting in Vissel Kobe's 2–0 victory over Kashima Antlers in the final of the 2019 Emperor's Cup.

On 8 February 2020, Vermaelen was one of nine consecutive players to miss their spot-kick in the penalty-shootout of the Japanese Super Cup; his teammate Hotaru Yamaguchi eventually won the match for the cup winners with a successful penalty. On 15 May, he scored his first goal for the club in a 1–1 draw against Cerezo Osaka.

On 21 January 2022, the Royal Belgian Football Association announced Vermaelen's retirement as a player, adding that he would be joining the Belgium national team as an assistant coach ahead of the 2022 FIFA World Cup.

== International career ==
A former youth international, Vermaelen had participated in the U-19 Championships and the 2007 U-21 European Championships. He made his senior debut for Belgium at age 20 against Luxembourg in March 2006. On 8 October 2009, he was named Belgium captain prior to the games against Turkey and Estonia in the 2010 World Cup qualifiers, but could not prevent the Belgians from finishing fourth in their group. He was recalled to squad for 14 November friendly against Hungary and scored his first goal for his country by tapping in an Eden Hazard cross.

On 13 May 2014, Vermaelen was named in Belgium's squad for the 2014 World Cup. After spending Belgium's first match of the tournament, a 2–1 win against Algeria, on the substitutes' bench, Vermaelen was chosen to start in the second match against Russia, replacing former Ajax teammate Jan Vertonghen at left-back. However, after 31 minutes, Vermaelen was taken off with an injury and replaced by Vertonghen.

He also made the squads for UEFA Euro 2016, the 2018 FIFA World Cup and UEFA Euro 2021.

== Personal life ==
In 2012, Vermaelen began dating English glamour model and TV presenter Polly Parsons. The couple have two sons, Raff and Ace. The couple married in June 2017.

== Career statistics ==
=== Club ===
Appearances and goals by club, season and competition
Club	Season	League			National cup (Note: Includes KNVB Cup, FA Cup, Copa del Rey, Emperor's Cup.)		League cup (Note: Includes Football League Cup, J.League Cup.)		Continental		Other		Total	
Club	Season	Division	Apps	Goals	Apps	Goals	Apps	Goals	Apps	Goals	Apps	Goals	Apps	Goals
Ajax	2003–04	Eredivisie	1	0	0	0	—		0	0	—		1	0
Ajax	2005–06	Eredivisie	24	3	4	1	—		5 (Note: Appearances in UEFA Champions League)	0	0	0	33	4
Ajax	2006–07	Eredivisie	23	0	5	0	—		7 (Note: Two appearances in UEFA Champions League, five appearances in UEFA Cup)	0	1 (Note: Appearance in Johan Cruyff Shield)	0	36	0
Ajax	2007–08	Eredivisie	18	0	0	0	—		3 (Note: Two appearances in UEFA Champions League, one appearance in UEFA Cup)	0	1	0	21	0
Ajax	2008–09	Eredivisie	31	4	2	0	—		8 (Note: Appearances in UEFA Cup)	1	—		42	5
Ajax	Total		97	7	11	1	—		23	1	2	0	133	9
Waalwijk (loan)	2004–05	Eredivisie	13	2	1	0	—		—		—		14	2
Arsenal	2009–10	Premier League	33	7	1	0	0	0	11	1	—		45	8
Arsenal	2010–11	Premier League	5	0	0	0	0	0	0	0	—		5	0
Arsenal	2011–12	Premier League	29	6	2	0	2	0	7	0	—		40	6
Arsenal	2012–13	Premier League	29	0	2	0	1	1	7	0	—		39	1
Arsenal	2013–14	Premier League	14	0	3	0	2	0	2	0	—		21	0
Arsenal	Total		110	13	8	0	5	1	27	1	—		150	15
Barcelona	2014–15	La Liga	1	0	0	0	—		0	0	—		1	0
Barcelona	2015–16	La Liga	10	1	5	0	—		3	0	2 (Note: One appearance in Supercopa de España, one appearance in FIFA Club World Cup)	0	20	1
Barcelona	2017–18	La Liga	14	0	5	0	—		1	0	0	0	20	0
Barcelona	2018–19	La Liga	9	0	1	0	—		2	0	0	0	12	0
Barcelona	Total		34	1	10	0	—		6	0	3	0	53	1
Roma (loan)	2016–17	Serie A	9	0	0	0	—		3 (Note: One appearance in UEFA Champions League, two appearances in UEFA Europa League)	0	—		12	0
Vissel Kobe	2019	J1 League	8	0	4	0	0	0	—		—		12	0
Vissel Kobe	2020	J1 League	14	0	0	0	0	0	7 (Note: Appearances in AFC Champions League)	0	1 (Note: Appearance in Japanese Super Cup)	0	22	0
Vissel Kobe	2021	J1 League	23	1	1	0	0	0	—		—		24	1
Vissel Kobe	Total		45	1	5	0	0	0	7	0	1	0	58	1
Career total			308	24	36	1	5	1	66	2	5	0	420	28

=== International ===
Appearances and goals by national team and year
National team	Year	Apps	Goals
Belgium	2006	6	0
Belgium	2007	5	0
Belgium	2008	5	0
Belgium	2009	11	1
Belgium	2010	4	0
Belgium	2011	2	0
Belgium	2012	7	0
Belgium	2013	6	0
Belgium	2014	3	0
Belgium	2015	2	0
Belgium	2016	8	0
Belgium	2017	6	0
Belgium	2018	6	0
Belgium	2019	7	1
Belgium	2020	0	0
Belgium	2021	7	0
Total		85	2

Belgium score listed first, score column indicates score after each Vermaelen goal

List of international goals scored by Thomas Vermaelen
No.	Date	Venue	Opponent	Score	Result	Competition
1	14 November 2009	Jules Ottenstadion, Ghent, Belgium	Hungary	2–0	3–0	Friendly
2	9 September 2019	Hampden Park, Glasgow, Scotland	Scotland	2–0	4–0	UEFA Euro 2020 qualifying

== Honours ==
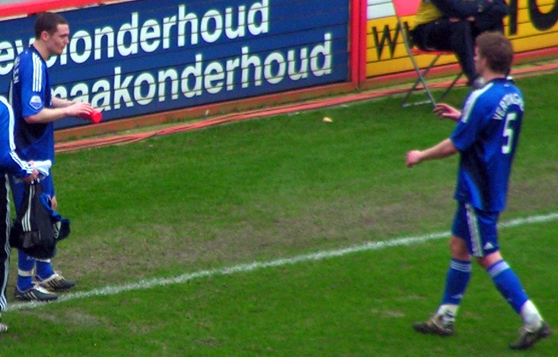
Vermaelen (left) with Jan Vertonghen at Ajax

Ajax

- Eredivisie: 2003–04
- KNVB Cup: 2005–06, 2006–07
- Johan Cruyff Shield: 2006, 2007

Arsenal

- FA Cup: 2013–14

Barcelona

- La Liga: 2014–15, 2015–16, 2017–18, 2018–19
- Copa del Rey: 2015–16, 2017–18
- FIFA Club World Cup: 2015

Vissel Kobe

- Emperor's Cup: 2019
- Japanese Super Cup: 2020

Belgium

- FIFA World Cup third place: 2018

Individual

- AFC Ajax Talent of the Year: 2006
- AFC Ajax Club of 100: 2009
- Best Belgian Player Abroad: 2009
- PFA Premier League Team of the Year: 2009–10
