= Eric Addo =

Ghanaian footballer

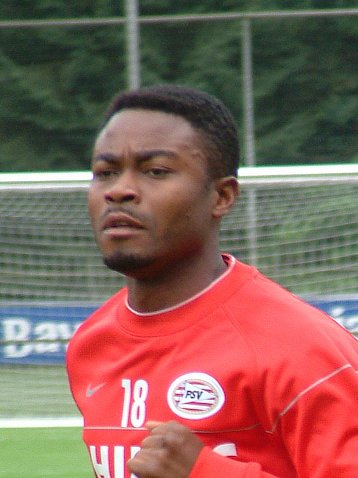
- Addo with PSV Eindhoven in 2008

Personal information
- Full name: Eric Pappoe Addo
- Date of birth: 12 November 1978 (age 47)
- Place of birth: Accra, Ghana
- Height: 1.83 m (6 ft 0 in)
- Position: Centre-back

Senior career*
Years	Team	Apps	(Gls)
1995–1996	Noble Harrics		
1996–1999	Club Brugge	65	(5)
1999–2009	PSV	82	(3)
2003	→ Roda JC (loan)	27	(0)
2009	→ Roda JC (loan)	6	(1)
2009–2011	Roda JC	25	(0)
2012	Eindhoven	4	(0)
Total		209	(9)

International career
1998–2010	Ghana	45	(0)
- * Club domestic league appearances and goals

Eric Pappoe Addo (born 12 November 1978) is a Ghanaian former professional footballer who played as a defender. After retiring, Addo worked as a coach at PSV.

Addo held potential because of his strength, pace and poise and ability to play central defender as well as defensive midfielder. However, his career was cut short by knee injuries.

== Club career ==
=== Club Brugge ===
Born in the Ghanaian capital Accra, Addo began his European career brightly at Club Brugge in 1996 and over three seasons at the Jan Breydelstadion made 65 appearances, scoring five goals. At Brugges, he was viewed as a potential superstar on the European stage after bursting into the first team ranks and helping them to win the Belgian Championship. He was voted the 1997–98 Young Belgian Footballer of the Year by Belgian journalists and Ghana Player of the Year the same season. He also won the Belgian Ebony Shoe award for being the best African player (or player with African roots) in the Belgian league. The jury was composed of the league clubs' coaches, the Belgium national team coach, sports journalists and an honorary jury.

=== PSV Eindhoven ===
Addo joined PSV Eindhoven during summer 1999 on a five-year contract, although he spent most of his first three years injured or as a substitute.

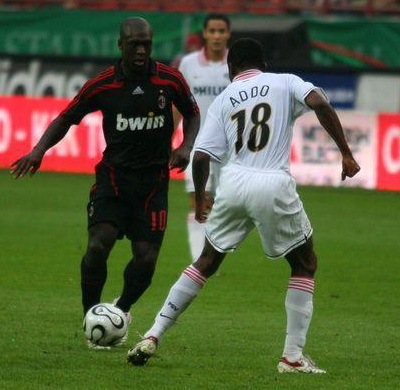
Addo playing PSV against Seedorf of Milan in a friendly game on 3 August 2007 at the Lokomotiv Stadium, Moscow.

He played just 24 times during this period, going out on loan at Roda JC for two years – before finally becoming a regular, as PSV retained their Eredivisie title in 2006. "I'm hoping now to show at Roda what I can do," Addo told Dutch magazine Voetbal International. "When I moved to PSV there was a lot of pressure and obviously it got worst when I was injured. They paid a lot of money for me. I still need to show the supporters what I am capable of and the move to Roda is the solution for me."

A 1–0 away loss at Anfield against Liverpool F.C. in the quarterfinal second leg of the 2006–07 UEFA Champions League was his last game for PSV in the competition. PSV lost 4–0 on aggregate to the 2005 UEFA Champions League winners, after losing 3–0 at home.

On 29 April 2007, Addo won his fifth Eredivisie Championship with PSV in 2006–07, with a 5–1 win on the final day home against Vitesse Arnhem. Pre-match, PSV, Ajax and AZ Alkmaar were tied on 72 points. PSV coach Ronald Koeman started Alex and Addo at the heart of defence in the decider.

==== Contract extension ====
On 3 April 2007, Addo told BBC Sport that "I will not extend my contract with PSV because things are not improving here for me. The African Cup of Nations is getting close and if I have to stay I should be guaranteed more playing time to be fit for the tournament in Ghana." He added, "The club understands my situation and they have agreed to allow me to leave at the end of the season."

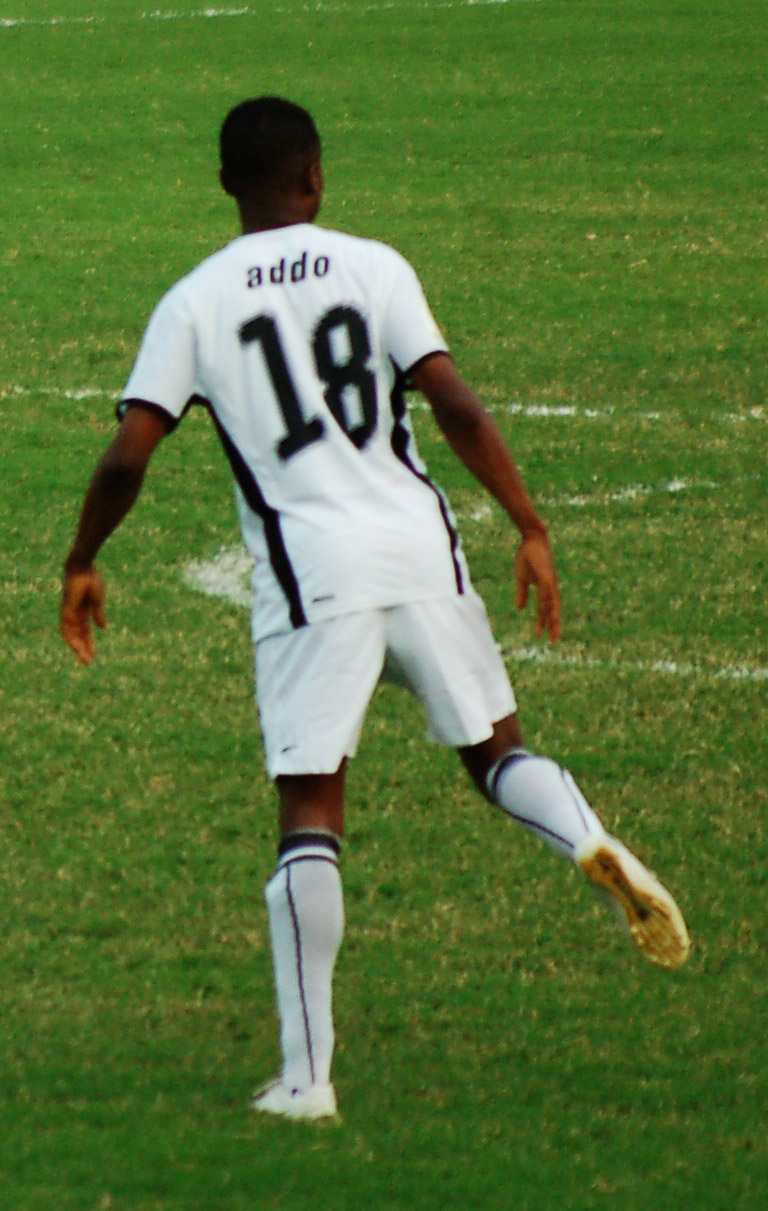
Addo warms up at the African Cup of Nations 2008.

On 22 April 2007, Addo was linked with a move to Galatasaray S.K. in the Dutch media. He was also linked with FC Twente, whose manager Fred Rutten knows Addo from his time at PSV. However, on 22 May 2007, Addo changed his mind and signed a new contract extension with PSV.

On 26 October 2007, Addo was charged with 'committing an act of gross unsporting conduct' and received a four match ban from UEFA for spitting at Fenerbahçe player Semih Şentürk during an ill-tempered Champions League match on 23 October. PSV later claimed that he was provoked by the striker who elbowed him moments before the incident occurred; this explanation was rejected by the association.

== International career ==
Addo was given the chance to represent his adopted country, Belgium, in the 1998 FIFA World Cup, but instead opted to play for his homeland. However, after playing in the 1998 African Cup of Nations, he spent six years in the international wilderness.

He was a member of the Ghanaian squad at the 2006 FIFA World Cup finals, playing in all four of Ghana's games including the exit to Brazil in the second round. His last game for Ghana was against Mexico in an international friendly in London, UK on 26 March 2008.

== Coaching career ==
After retiring and acquiring his UEFA Coaching license, Addo was appointed by PSV to serve as the assistant coach to their U-21 side.

== Personal life ==
His brother Ransford is also a former professional footballer.

Eric Addo attended St Anthony's Preparatory School at South Odorkor in Ghana; even at this early developmental stage, he showed great ability when playing soccer with his peers and student in grades ahead of him.

== Honours ==
=== Club ===
Club Brugge

- Belgian First Division: 1997–98
- Belgian Supercup: 1996, 1998

PSV Eindhoven

- Eredivisie: 1999–2000, 2000–01, 2004–05, 2005–06, 2006–07, 2007–08
- KNVB Cup: 2004–05. Runner-up: 2005–06
- Johan Cruijff Schaal: 2000, 2001, 2008. Runner-up: 2005, 2006

=== International ===
Ghana

- Africa Cup of Nations bronze medal: 2008
- Africa Cup of Nations silver medal: 2010

=== Individual ===
- Belgian Young Footballer of the Year: 1997–98
- Belgian Ebony Shoe: 1998
- Ghana Footballer of the Year Award: 1998
