= Olaf Lindenbergh =

Dutch footballer (born 1974)

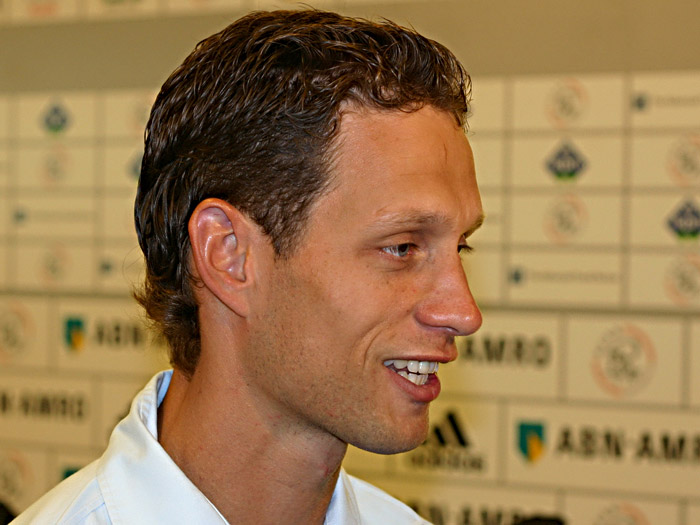
- Lindenbergh in 2006

Personal information
- Date of birth: 6 February 1974 (age 52)
- Place of birth: Purmerend, Netherlands
- Height: 1.79 m (5 ft 10 in)
- Position: Defensive midfielder

Youth career
- 1982–1986: ZOB
- 1986–1990: Ajax
- 1990–1994: De Graafschap

Senior career*
Years	Team	Apps	(Gls)
1994–1999	De Graafschap	159	(6)
2000–2005	AZ	135	(6)
2005–2007	Ajax	30	(0)
2007–2008	Sparta Rotterdam	18	(0)
2008–2009	Purmersteijn	25	(6)
2009–2010	AGOVV	33	(1)
2010–2012	Volendam	62	(1)
2012–2016	De Dijk		
2018	OFC	6	(0)
Total		468+	(20+)

International career
1994	Netherlands U21	1	(0)

Managerial career
- 2011–2012: Jong Volendam
- 2016–2018: De Dijk (assistant)
- 2018–2019: OFC (assistant)
- * Club domestic league appearances and goals

Olaf Lindenbergh (born 6 February 1974) is a Dutch former professional footballer who played as a defensive midfielder. Over an 18-year professional career, he spent the majority of his playing years in the Eredivisie with De Graafschap, AZ, and Ajax.

Following his retirement from professional football in 2012, Lindenbergh remained active in the sport as a coach and amateur player, with involvement in clubs such as De Dijk and various veterans' teams.

== Club career ==
Lindenbergh was born in Purmerend, North Holland. He began playing football at the age of eight with local club ZOB, before joining the youth academy of Ajax at age 12. He later moved to De Graafschap, where he progressed through the ranks and made his professional debut. He made his senior debut on 12 November 1994 in a 1–0 victory over VVV, during the 1994–95 Eerste Divisie season. Lindenbergh became a key figure in the squad and helped De Graafschap achieve promotion to the Eredivisie. He featured in 30 league matches during the 1995–96 Eredivisie campaign, and went on to make 159 appearances in all competitions for the club, scoring six goals.

In 1999, he signed with AZ Alkmaar. Lindenbergh quickly established himself as a regular starter, although his involvement decreased in his second season. By 2001, he had re-established his place in the first team. He was a central figure in AZ's notable run to the UEFA Cup semi-finals in 2005, where they were eliminated by Sporting CP. His performances that season attracted interest from Ajax, and he joined the Amsterdam club at the conclusion of the 2004–05 campaign.

Lindenbergh made his Ajax debut in a 2–0 league win over Willem II in 2005. He made 18 Eredivisie appearances in his first season and featured in the UEFA Champions League group stage. Ajax won the KNVB Cup that year. Under new manager Henk ten Cate, however, his playing time declined, with only 12 league appearances in the 2006–07 season. Although he remained involved in cup fixtures—helping Ajax retain the KNVB Cup—he fell out of favour and was eventually deemed surplus to requirements. Lindenbergh left the club in 2007 to join Sparta Rotterdam.

In the 2008–09 season, Lindenbergh played amateur football with Purmersteijn while also competing in the top tier of Dutch futsal, earning selection to the national futsal team. In August 2009, he returned to professional football, signing a one-year contract with AGOVV following a successful trial. The following year, he joined Volendam, where he combined playing duties with a coaching internship for the club's under-13 youth team.

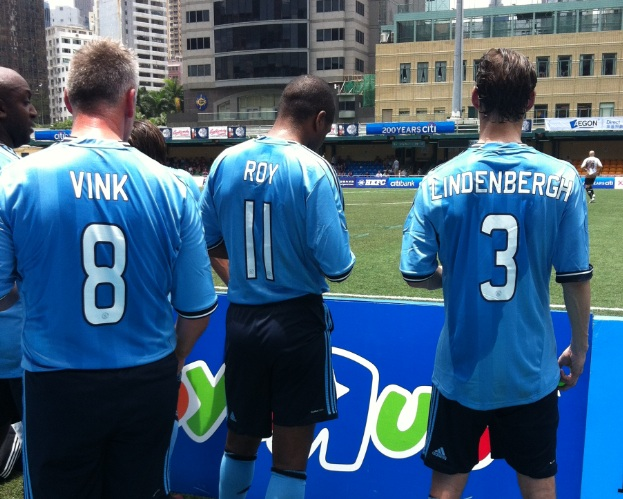
Vink Roy and Linderbergh for "Ajax Legend" in HK7 soccer 2012

== International career ==
While at De Graafschap, Lindenbergh was called up into the Netherlands under-21 national team squad. He made his only appearance for the team on 15 November 1994, replacing Arjan Ebbinge in the 80th minute of a 2–2 draw against Czech Republic U21.

== Coaching and later career ==
In 2012, Lindenbergh joined amateur side ASV De Dijk, competing in the Vierde Klasse. Following his retirement from playing in 2016, he remained with the club as an assistant coach. In January 2018, he came out of retirement to serve as playing assistant coach for OFC Oostzaan.

In the years following his retirement, Lindenbergh remained involved in football through various coaching and ambassadorial roles. He worked intermittently with the Ajax Academy and participated in matches with Lucky Ajax, the club's official team of former players, as well as with FC De Rebellen, a team of ex-professionals active in charity and exhibition matches. He also contributed occasionally to ZaanPro, a football school run by former professional player Miel Mans.
