= Gabri (footballer, born 1979) =

Spanish football manager

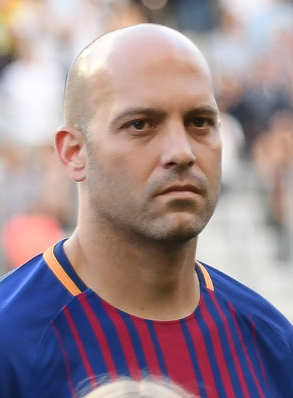
- Gabri in 2018

Personal information
- Full name: Gabriel Francisco García de la Torre
- Date of birth: 10 February 1979 (age 47)
- Place of birth: Sallent, Spain
- Height: 1.75 m (5 ft 9 in)
- Position: Midfielder

Youth career
- 1985–1991: Sallent
- 1991–1993: Sabadell
- 1993–1997: Barcelona

Senior career*
Years	Team	Apps	(Gls)
1997–2000	Barcelona B	67	(9)
1999–2006	Barcelona	129	(7)
2006–2010	Ajax	86	(7)
2010–2011	Umm Salal	13	(3)
2011	Sion II	2	(1)
2011	Sion	5	(0)
2012–2014	Lausanne-Sport	28	(1)
Total		330	(28)

International career
1994–1995	Spain U16	8	(2)
1996–1998	Spain U18	10	(1)
1999	Spain U20	7	(3)
1999–2001	Spain U21	17	(0)
2000	Spain U23	6	(3)
2003–2004	Spain	3	(0)
2000–2006	Catalonia	4	(0)

Managerial career
- 2014–2015: Barcelona B (assistant)
- 2015–2017: Barcelona (youth)
- 2017–2018: Sion
- 2018–2020: Andorra
- 2021: Olot
- 2021–2022: Lleida Esportiu
- 2022: Sabadell
- 2023: Nantong Zhiyun
- 2023–2024: Guangxi Pingguo Haliao
- 2024–2026: Atlètic Lleida
Medal record
Representing Spain
Men's Football
Silver medal – second place	2000 Sydney	Team competition
FIFA World Youth Championship
Winner	1999 Nigeria
- * Club domestic league appearances and goals

Gabriel Francisco García de la Torre (born 10 February 1979), known as Gabri, is a Spanish former professional footballer, currently a manager. Mainly a midfielder who could play in the right or the middle, he could also appear as an attacking right-back.

He spent seven years of his 17-year senior career with Barcelona (13 counting youth teams), winning four major titles but almost exclusively as a backup, totalling 194 games and 13 goals. He also played four seasons with Ajax.

Gabri represented Spain at Euro 2004. He later managed in the Spanish lower divisions.

== Club career ==
=== Barcelona ===
Born in Sallent, Barcelona, Catalonia, Gabri started his professional career at FC Barcelona's reserves, where he made his first appearances in the 1997–98 season whilst they competed in the Segunda División B. He scored four goals in 28 games en route to promotion, including once in a 5–0 home win against Real Madrid Castilla in the playoffs.

Gabri was promoted to the main squad for the 1999–2000 campaign, making his debut on 8 August in the first leg of the Supercopa de España as a 77th-minute substitute for Phillip Cocu in the 1–0 loss at Valencia CF (4–3 aggregate defeat). Two weeks later, on his La Liga bow, he came off the bench in a 2–0 victory over Real Zaragoza at the Camp Nou in the season opener. On 27 October, he played a full match for the first time and scored his first goal in a 5–0 home defeat of AIK Fotboll in the first group stage of the UEFA Champions League; he totalled a career-best six goals in this first season, including three more against Hertha BSC and AC Sparta Prague in the next part of the competition.

Over the next three years, Gabri was a regular. He featured less in the 2004–05 and 2005–06 seasons in which he won his only Barcelona honours under Frank Rijkaard (two leagues, one Supercup and the 2005–06 UEFA Champions League). On 23 September 2004 he suffered a severe anterior cruciate ligament injury with a prognosis of six months in a 4–1 home win over Zaragoza. While he did not even make the bench for the 2006 Champions League final which his team won against Arsenal, he scored to open a 3–1 home victory against SV Werder Bremen in the group phase on 22 November. In his final appearance for the club on 13 May 2006, he was sent off in added time for arguing with the assistant referee.

=== Ajax ===
Gabri's contract at Barcelona was not renewed, and he joined AFC Ajax on a free transfer on 6 June 2006, alongside former teammate Roger García. There, he immediately won the Johan Cruyff Shield in a 3–1 defeat of PSV Eindhoven in August, and was also a key element in a side that lost the Eredivisie on the last matchday, to the same opposition.

In May 2007, Gabri won the KNVB Cup on penalties against AZ Alkmaar, in a match where he received a red card in the 79th minute. In August, Ajax successfully defended their Supercup title by beating PSV again, with him as the only goalscorer in the match.

=== Later career ===
On 27 May 2010, after a last poor individual season with Ajax – only 13 matches, even though the Amsterdam side finished in second place – the 31-year-old Gabri signed for Qatar Stars League club Umm Salal SC. On 4 July of the following year he moved countries again, joining FC Sion in Switzerland.

On 25 July 2012, having taken almost no part in the Super League campaign, Gabri changed teams but stayed in the country, agreeing to a contract at FC Lausanne-Sport.

== International career ==
Gabri was a key element in Spain's squad at the 1999 FIFA World Youth Championship, scoring three goals to become World Champion of the category. He was also a member of the national team at the 2000 Summer Olympics in Sydney.

After making his full debut on 30 April 2003 in a friendly with Ecuador, Gabri went on to represent the nation at UEFA Euro 2004 in Portugal, not leaving the bench in an eventual group-stage exit.

== Coaching career ==
Gabri retired from playing at the age of 35, and immediately returned to Barcelona as assistant to their reserves. In July 2015, as part of a reshuffle by incoming director José Segura, he changed roles within the club, becoming the coach of the Juvenil A.

On 24 October 2017, Gabri was appointed manager at Sion until June 2019, succeeding Paolo Tramezzani. His debut in senior management came five days later in a 5–1 defeat at BSC Young Boys. He won once and lost six times in eight games as the team dropped from seventh to bottom tenth, before being replaced by Maurizio Jacobacci on 7 February.

At the end of December 2018, Gabri signed with FC Andorra with former Barcelona teammate Albert Jorquera as his assistant, following Gerard Piqué's acquisition of the principality-based club in Catalan regional football. They won the Primera Catalana in his first season, achieving a double promotion after buying the place of economically troubled CF Reus Deportiu. On 24 February 2020, after three consecutive losses and seven matches without a win, he was dismissed.

Remaining in the third tier, Gabri managed UE Olot from January to April 2021, leaving by mutual consent. On 1 June that year, he signed for Lleida Esportiu for the next three seasons; he stayed for only one year in the Segunda Federación, in which the side lost in the first round of the playoffs after a goalless draw with seeded Sestao River Club.

Gabri replaced Pedro Munitis at the helm of CE Sabadell FC of Primera Federación in July 2022. The team had a sharp drop in budget and mostly relied on youth, with him fielding 27 players in 17 games, losing nine; he was dismissed on 19 December while lying two points inside the relegation zone.

On 16 June 2023, Gabri was appointed manager at Chinese Super League's Nantong Zhiyun F.C. for the remainder of the season. He resigned on 25 September, subsequently signing for Guangxi Pingguo Haliao F.C. also in the country but in League One.

== Managerial statistics ==
As of 17 January 2026

Managerial record by team and tenure
Team	From	To	Record								Ref
Team	From	To	G	W	D	L	GF	GA	GD	Win %	Ref
Sion	25 October 2017	5 February 2018	8	1	1	6	12	22	−10	12.50	
FC Andorra	30 December 2018	25 February 2020	46	24	15	7	69	38	+31	52.17	
Olot	26 January 2021	25 April 2021	12	4	1	7	11	14	−3	33.33	
Lleida Esportiu	1 June 2021	22 May 2022	38	17	9	12	42	39	+3	44.74	
Sabadell	12 July 2022	19 December 2022	17	5	3	9	18	26	−8	29.41	
Nantong Zhiyun	16 June 2023	25 September 2023	17	3	7	7	18	24	−6	17.65	
Guangxi Pingguo Haliao	5 December 2023	2 April 2024	4	2	1	1	4	2	+2	50.00	
Atlètic Lleida	8 July 2024	20 January 2026	60	22	21	17	96	72	+24	36.67	
Total			202	78	58	66	270	237	+33	38.61	—

== Honours ==
Barcelona

- La Liga: 2004–05, 2005–06
- Supercopa de España: 2005
- UEFA Champions League: 2005–06

Ajax

- KNVB Cup: 2006–07, 2009–10
- Johan Cruyff Shield: 2006, 2007

Spain U20

- FIFA World Youth Championship: 1999

Spain U23

- Summer Olympics silver medal: 2000
