= Mauro Rosales =

Argentine footballer (born 1981)

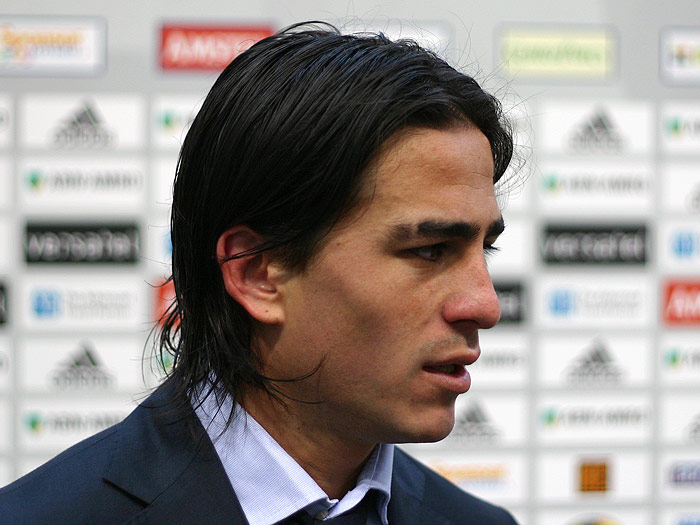

Personal information
- Full name: Mauro Damián Rosales
- Date of birth: 24 February 1981 (age 45)
- Place of birth: Villa María, Argentina
- Height: 1.73 m (5 ft 8 in)
- Position: Attacking midfielder

Senior career*
Years	Team	Apps	(Gls)
1999–2004	Newell's Old Boys	119	(30)
2004–2007	Ajax	63	(6)
2007–2010	River Plate	64	(4)
2011–2013	Seattle Sounders FC	86	(12)
2014	Chivas USA	21	(0)
2014–2015	Vancouver Whitecaps FC	35	(1)
2016	FC Dallas	23	(2)
2017	Vancouver Whitecaps FC	7	(0)
2019	Alumni	2	(1)
Total		420	(56)

International career
2001	Argentina U20	5	(0)
2004	Argentina Olympic	6	(1)
2004	Argentina	10	(1)
Medal record
Representing Argentina
Men's Football
Gold medal – first place	2004 Athens	Team competition
- * Club domestic league appearances and goals

Mauro Damián Rosales (born 24 February 1981) is an Argentine former professional footballer who played as an attacking midfielder. Best known for his pace and crossing ability, he won a gold medal with Argentina at the 2004 Summer Olympics.

== Club career ==
Rosales began his career with Newell's Old Boys. His play with Newell's attracted the interest of top European clubs and in 2004 he joined Dutch top side Ajax. While with Ajax Rosales appeared in 63 league matches scoring 6 goals. In 2007 Rosales left Ajax returning to Argentina to play for River Plate for a fee of 1.8 million euros. He was part of the squad that won the Clausura 2008 tournament, the club's first title in four years.

In January 2011 it was reported that he would be joining Querétaro F.C. of Mexico's Primera División. However, he was not signed by the Mexican club. In late February 2011 he went on trial with Seattle Sounders FC of Major League Soccer in the United States. On 18 March 2011, following a successful trial, the club officially signed Rosales. During Rosales' first season with Seattle, he scored 5 goals in 26 appearances. Additionally, he assisted on 13 goals which was third overall in the league. His 13 assists also set a club record for number of assists by a single player in a single season. Rosales won the MLS Newcomer of the Year Award for the 2011 Major League Soccer season and was subsequently signed to a new, multi-year deal on 13 December 2011. In his three years with the club Rosales tallied 12 goals and 34 assists in league play. He also helped the club in capturing the 2011 Lamar Hunt U.S. Open Cup.

Rosales was traded to Chivas USA in exchange for Tristan Bowen on 11 December 2013.

Rosales was traded to Vancouver Whitecaps FC in exchange for Nigel Reo-Coker on 21 August 2014. At the end of the 2014 season, Rosales opted out of the MLS re-entry draft for the next season later signing with the club for an additional year. The following year the Whitecaps did not offer a contract to Rosales and he was made eligible for the MLS reentry draft. He started in 29 of the 35 games he played for the club scoring one goal and assisting in six other in 2321 minutes of regular season play and an additional 91 minutes in two games in the post-season.

On 16 February 2016, Rosales was traded to FC Dallas in exchange for Blas Pérez.

== International career ==
Rosales was part of the Argentina U20 national team that won the 2001 FIFA World Youth Championship and the gold medal-winning Argentina national team at the 2004 Summer Olympics. Also in 2004, he was part of the Argentina squad that finished runners-up in that year's Copa America.

== Personal life ==
Rosales earned his U.S. green card in March 2012. This status qualifies him as a domestic player for MLS roster purposes.

== Career statistics ==
#	Date	Venue	Opponent	Score	Result	Competition
1	4 September 2004	Estadio Monumental "U", Lima, Peru	Peru	0–1	1–3	2006 FIFA World Cup qualification

== Honours ==
Ajax

- KNVB Cup: 2005–06, 2006–07
- Johan Cruijff Shield: 2005, 2006

River Plate

- Primera División: Clausura 2008

Seattle Sounders FC

- Lamar Hunt U.S. Open Cup: 2011

Vancouver Whitecaps FC

- Canadian Championship: 2015

FC Dallas

- Lamar Hunt U.S. Open Cup: 2016
- Supporters' Shield: 2016

Argentina U20

- FIFA U-20 World Cup: 2001

Argentina U23

- Summer Olympic Games: 2004

Argentina

- Copa América runner-up: 2004

Individual

- MLS Newcomer of the Year: 2011

Sporting positions
Preceded by Kasey Keller	Seattle Sounders FC captain 2012–2013	Succeeded by Brad Evans
