= Henk ten Cate =

Dutch football manager (born 1954)

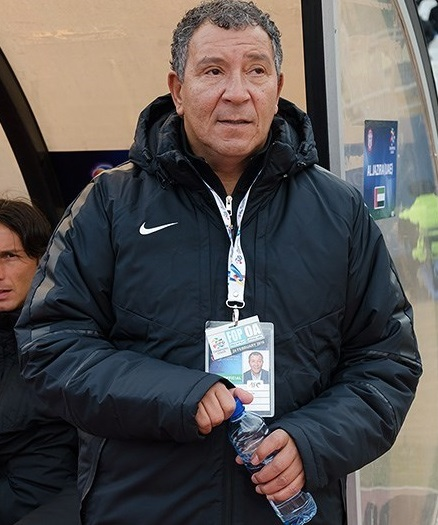
- Cate with Al Jazira in 2016

Personal information
- Full name: Hendrik Willem ten Cate
- Date of birth: 9 December 1954 (age 71)
- Place of birth: Amsterdam, Netherlands
- Height: 1.75 m (5 ft 9 in)
- Position: Left winger

Youth career
- Ajax
- –1973: De Volewijckers
- 1973–1975: Vitesse

Senior career*
Years	Team	Apps	(Gls)
1975–1977	Vitesse	3	(0)
1977–1979	VV Rheden		
1979–1985	Go Ahead Eagles	139	(21)
1980	→ Edmonton Drillers (loan)	21	(5)
1981–1982	→ Telstar (loan)	30	(7)
1985–1986	Heracles	19	(1)
Total		212	(34)

Managerial career
- 1986–1990: Go Ahead Eagles (assistant)
- 1990: Go Ahead Eagles
- 1990–1992: Heracles
- 1992–1993: VV Rheden
- 1993–1995: Go Ahead Eagles
- 1995–1997: Sparta
- 1997–1998: Vitesse
- 1998–1999: KFC Uerdingen
- 1999–2000: MTK Budapest
- 2000–2003: NAC
- 2003–2006: Barcelona (assistant)
- 2006–2007: Ajax
- 2007–2008: Chelsea (assistant)
- 2008–2009: Panathinaikos
- 2010: Al-Ahli
- 2010–2011: Umm Salal
- 2012–2013: Shandong Luneng
- 2013: Sparta
- 2015–2018: Al-Jazira
- 2018–2019: Al-Wahda
- 2019–2020: Al-Ittihad
- 2021: Al-Wahda
- 2023: Suriname (assistant)
- 2025–2026: Suriname
- * Club domestic league appearances and goals

Hendrik Willem ten Cate (born 9 December 1954) is a Dutch football coach and former player.

During the 2005–06 season, he was assistant to Frank Rijkaard at Barcelona as the club won the UEFA Champions League and La Liga. He later managed Ajax until October 2007, winning three trophies with the Dutch club.

Henk Tenk joined Chelsea on 11 October 2007 as assistant manager, but stepped down after the 2008 UEFA Champions League Final defeat on 29 May 2008, five days after manager Avram Grant left the club.

== Playing career ==
Ten Cate started his football career at amateur side FC Rheden before signing his first professional contract at Go Ahead Eagles. He made his Eredivisie debut in the 1979–80 season and earned himself 27 appearances throughout the season in which he scored four goals. These performances earned him a transfer to NASL side Edmonton Drillers in Canada.

After the North American season he returned to Go Ahead Eagles and continued his Eredivisie campaign. He became however unsure of his position and was sent on loan to Eerste Divisie side Telstar where he was one of their key players. After the season at Telstar he returned to Deventer and became a first team regular for Go Ahead Eagles again for three more seasons. In 1985, he switched to Heracles, where he ended his professional career as a player.

== Managerial career ==
After his playing career, Ten Cate became an assistant manager of Fritz Korbach at Go Ahead Eagles, playing in the Eerste Divisie. When Korbach moved to Heerenveen in February 1990, Ten Cate took over as a manager. He managed to lead them to a play-off place at the end of the season, but Heerenveen were promoted to the Eredivisie on goal difference.

Ten Cate left Go Ahead Eagles and returned to one of the other teams he was active at during his playing career, Heracles where he became the assistant of manager Henk van Brussel. When Van Brussel was unable to finish the season due to health problems, in November 1990 Ten Cate became the first team manager and led Heracles until 1992, when he was told his contract would not be extended. He moved to the club where his football career started, amateur side FC Rheden, and managed them for one year.

In 1993, Go Ahead Eagles appointed Ten Cate yet again as their manager, this time to replace Jan Versleijen who left the club to manage De Graafschap. In his first year, he did well, but when Go Ahead Eagles was at the bottom of the Eerste Divisie during the winter break of the 1994–95 season, he was fired. Eredivisie side Sparta Rotterdam offered him a contract and he led the team to a sixth position in the Eredivisie in 1996; they also reached the final of the KNVB Cup that year, which they lost 5-2 to PSV Eindhoven.

In the 1997–98 winter break, Ten Cate switched to manage Vitesse, which he led to their best Eredivisie ranking in their history, third place, with records in both the number of points won, as well as the number of goals scored. After a disappointing start in the following season, he left Vitesse and led KFC Uerdingen 05 until March 1999 without success. In the 1999–00 season, he managed Hungarian side MTK Hungária to win the Hungarian Cup and a runners-up place in the PNB League. He returned to the Netherlands and became manager of NAC which he led until 2003 earning them a spot in the UEFA Cup for the 2003–04 season.

In June 2003, Ajax offered him the chance to be their next manager, however, he decided to join Frank Rijkaard at Barcelona, and became his assistant manager because Frank Rijkaard had the lack of experience as a top manager at that time. Thus, Frank Rijkaard believed that Ten Cate was able to compensate for his weak points as a manager. Rijkaard explained: "I was a motivator, Henk [ten Cate] was a strategist for the team". Indeed, Ten Cate was responsible for strategies and tactics of Barcelona during its training sessions. Together, they managed Barça to a Champions League trophy and two La Liga titles. In 2006, he replaced Danny Blind as a manager at Ajax, where he won the Johan Cruijff-schaal in 2006 and 2007 and the KNVB Cup in 2007. Ajax finished equal on points with PSV Eindhoven in the Eredivisie in 2006, only to be denied the championship by a single goal in goal difference.

=== Chelsea ===
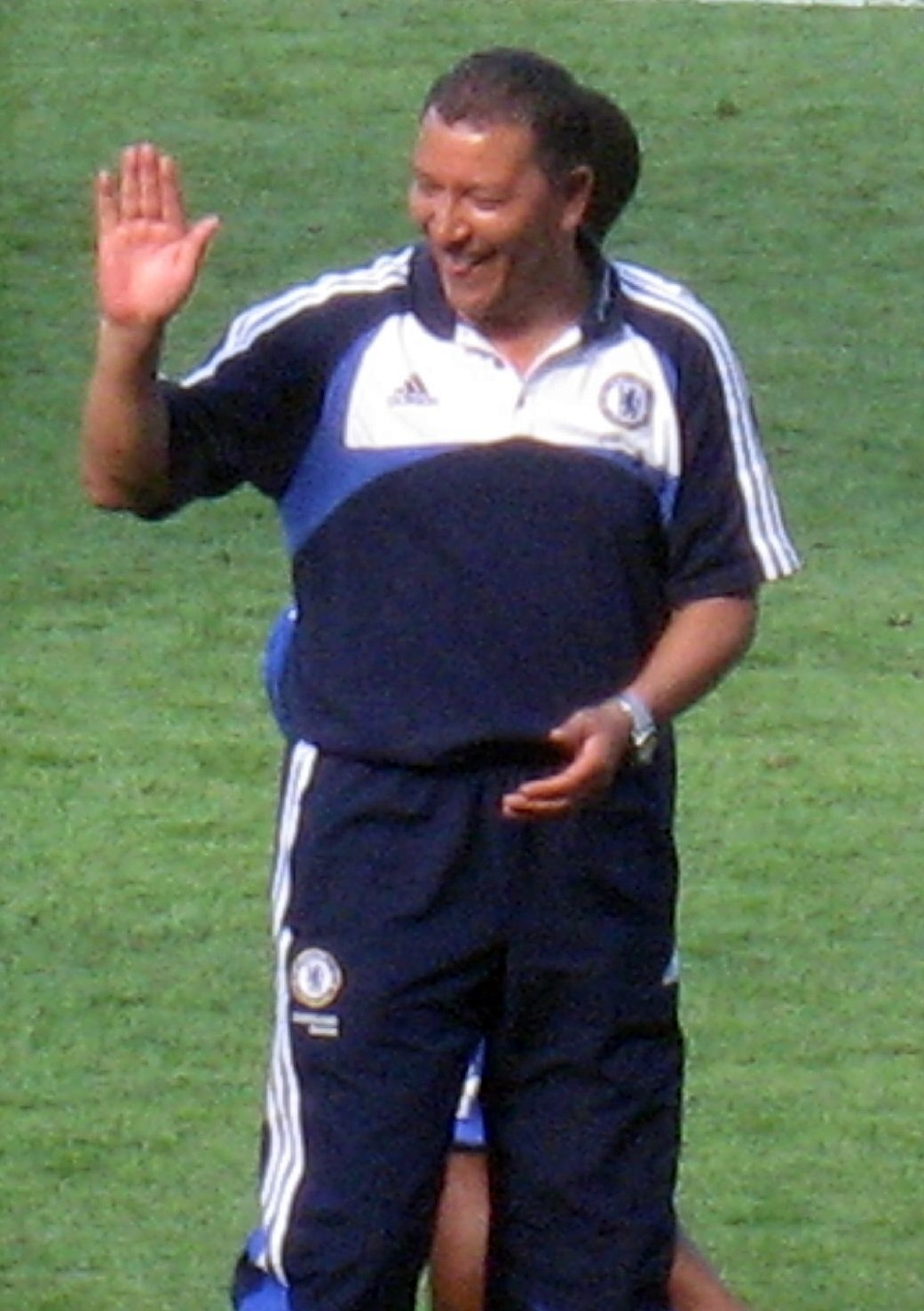
Ten Cate with Chelsea.

In early October 2007, Ten Cate was strongly linked to taking over as assistant manager to Avram Grant at Chelsea, because the owner, Russian billionaire Roman Abramovich, had a high opinion of Ten Cate as a great tactician. On 8 October 2007, Ajax announced on their website that they had reached an agreement with Chelsea about Ten Cate's immediate move to the London side, noting also that the deal was still to be finalized. Ten Cate officially joined Chelsea on 11 October 2007 as assistant first team coach.

Following the 2008 UEFA Champions League Final, Ten Cate expressed his disappointment with Didier Drogba for his sending-off (if Drogba had not been sent off, he would have taken the fifth penalty). Drogba's expulsion led to John Terry taking Chelsea's fifth penalty, which he failed to convert, as he slipped on the rain-soaked turf. Had he scored, Chelsea would have secured their first Champions League title.

Ten Cate was sacked from his role at Chelsea on 29 May 2008, two days after being told the sacking of Avram Grant would not affect his position.

=== Panathinaikos ===
On 13 June 2008, Ten Cate signed a two-year deal with a Greek Super League team, Panathinaikos. Ten Cate gave the following statement on his appointment:

"Panathinaikos' history, ambition and attitude towards football in general match those of the greatest football clubs in Europe. "I've been used to working at the highest level and that's why I consider this a great challenge."

Ten Cate's Panathinaikos managed to qualify for the last 16 phase of UEFA Champions' League in the 2008–2009 season, where Panathinaikos were eliminated by Villarreal. However, they won the European Cup play-Offs, winning the second seed for the next year's Champions League play-offs. In his first year to the club, Ten Cate built Panathinaikos to play an attacking style of play based on possession in 4–2–3–1 and 4–3–2–1 formations, and they scored the most goals in the league.

The Panathinaikos board kept Ten Cate in his position for a second year, in which the club managed to achieve its best start in the league since 1996, with nine wins and two draws in eleven matches. However, the club's financial situation was seriously affected by the Greek government-debt crisis, and it was revealed that they had £4million worth of unpaid wages for Ten Cate. Ten Cate resigned as manager on 8 December 2009.

=== Middle East and Asia ===
On 6 February 2010, it was announced that Ten Cate signed a six-month contract with the UAE champions Al-Ahli. Only one month later, he quit Al-Ahli, after a 5–0 defeat against Al-Sadd.

In April 2010, Umm Salal hired him as a replacement of Gerard Gili. Ten Cate worked as a manager of Umm Salal until February 2011.

On 5 January 2012, Ten Cate became the manager of Shandong Luneng Taishan in China. However, as Shandong Luneng Taishan spent most of the season struggling at the edge of relegation, ten Cate resigned on 6 September.

On 4 April 2013, he shortly replaced the sacked Michel Vonk as manager of Sparta Rotterdam on a contract running until the end of the season. He returned to the Middle East in December 2015 after signing for UAE club Al Jazira, with whom he won the domestic league title in his second (and first full) season.

In April 2017, he was reportedly offered the job of managing of the Dutch national team, only for him to back out, after it appeared the Dutch FA suddenly preferred to give the job to Dick Advocaat. At the same time, Ten Cate was subject to a legal investigation into certain business interests.

He left Al Jazira in May 2018.

On 4 November 2019, ten Cate was announced as Al-Ittihad's manager. He signed a contract which is due to keep him at Al-Ittihad until the end of the 2019–20 season, but with a possibility to extend the contract at the end of the season. However, he was dismissed on 11 February 2020, after a defeat against Damac.

In March 2021, ten Cate returned to Abu Dhabi to manage Al Wahda again. He was sacked in October, after a disappointing start to the season.

== Career statistics ==
Appearances and goals by club, season and competition
Club	Season	League		
Club	Season	Division	Apps	Goals
Go Ahead Eagles	1979–80	Eredivisie	27	4
Go Ahead Eagles	1980–81	Eredivisie	19	3
Go Ahead Eagles	1981–82	Eredivisie	1	0
Go Ahead Eagles	1982–83	Eredivisie	31	10
Go Ahead Eagles	1983–84	Eredivisie	24	2
Go Ahead Eagles	1984–85	Eredivisie	30	2
Go Ahead Eagles	Total		132	21
Edmonton Drillers (loan)	1980	North American Soccer League	21	5
Telstar (loan)	1981–82	Eerste Divisie	30	7
Heracles	1985–86	Eredivisie	19	1
Career total			202	34

== Managerial statistics ==
As of 5 January 2024

Managerial record by team and tenure
Team	Nat	From	To	Record				
Team	Nat	From	To	G	W	D	L	Win %
Go Ahead Eagles	(Netherlands)	1 July 1993	27 January 1995	55	12	14	29	21.82
Sparta Rotterdam	(Netherlands)	1 July 1995	11 January 1997	61	24	14	23	39.34
Vitesse	(Netherlands)	12 January 1997	30 June 1998	55	30	12	13	54.55
Uerdingen	(Germany)	30 September 1998	28 March 1999	17	3	5	9	17.65
MTK Budapest	(Hungary)	1 July 1999	30 June 2000	40	22	11	7	55.00
NAC	(Netherlands)	1 July 2000	30 June 2003	116	50	34	32	43.10
Ajax	(Netherlands)	1 July 2006	8 October 2007	68	45	10	13	66.18
Panathinaikos	(Greece)	1 June 2008	7 December 2009	75	45	17	13	60.00
Al-Ahli Dubai	(United Arab Emirates)	6 February 2010	11 March 2010	6	1	2	3	16.67
Umm Salal	(Qatar)	12 April 2010	6 February 2011	26	11	6	9	42.31
Shandong Luneng	(China)	1 January 2012	6 September 2012	27	8	10	9	29.63
Sparta Rotterdam	(Netherlands)	7 April 2013	30 June 2013	8	2	5	1	25.00
Al Jazira	(United Arab Emirates)	31 December 2015	15 May 2018	111	52	21	38	46.85
Al Wahda	(United Arab Emirates)	7 December 2018	30 June 2019	23	15	2	6	65.22
Al-Ittihad	(Saudi Arabia)	15 November 2019	30 June 2020	13	4	5	4	30.77
Al Wahda	(United Arab Emirates)	13 March 2021	25 October 2021	22	9	9	4	40.91
Total				723	333	177	213	46.06

== Honours ==
=== Manager ===
MTK Budapest

- Magyar Kupa: 1999–2000

Ajax

- KNVB Cup: 2006–07
- Johan Cruijff Shield: 2006, 2007

Al Jazira

- UAE Pro League: 2016–17
