= René Temmink =

Dutch football referee

René Temmink (born 24 June 1960) is a Dutch former football referee. With his 203 cm (6 ft 8 in) he was one of the tallest referees on the football pitches.

== Career ==
Born in Deventer, Overijssel, Temmink started his career as a youth coach with local amateur team Helios in Deventer, while playing football himself. When a referee did not show up Temmink decided to replace him. A KNVB official invited him to become a referee. He started as a youth referee, but advanced to senior matches in his first year. He was promoted to the KNVB eastern district in 1987. In 1990, he reached the C-list and was promoted to the B-list of Dutch football a year later. During the 1993–94 season he made it into the A-list and became an international referee on 1 January 1995.

In the 2001–02 season Temmink was promoted to the FIFA Referee Group 1, recognised as one of the 30 best referees in Europe. On a national level he showed up in more traditional matches like the Klassieker between Feyenoord Rotterdam and Ajax Amsterdam as well as various UEFA Champions League matches. He was also the referee at the 2002 KNVB Cup final between Ajax and FC Utrecht. In the 2003–04 season Temmink led one match in the Ligue 1 in France.

Temmink led his last game of his career on 23 December 2006 between SC Heerenveen and Excelsior Rotterdam. KNVB official Bert van Oostveen awarded him a batch and a document in honour for his contributions to KNVB related tournaments. In total Temmink was part of the KNVB referees for 15 years, with 11 years of international matches. He was the referee in over 400 matches in the Netherlands.

His first match in professional football was a match between FC Emmen and TOP Oss, while his first Eredivisie match was between Sparta Rotterdam and Roda JC. Temmink led 75 matches of the most important international tournaments like the UEFA Champions League, the UEFA Cup and international matches. Among his most notable matches are matches like FC Porto-Celtic FC, Galatasaray SK-FC Barcelona, Chelsea FC-FC Bayern Munich, AS Roma-Real Madrid and FC Barcelona-Panathinaikos. As well as Germany-Denmark, Spain-Brazil, Belarus-Italy and France-Israel. He also led the final between France and Spain at the youth world championships in Egypt, as well as the European Super Cup final in Monaco between CSKA Moscow and Liverpool F.C. in 2005.

Among his favourite stadiums Temmink names Old Trafford and De Kuip. Temmink thinks Pierluigi Collina and Anders Frisk are among the best referees in the world.

As of 1 January 2007 Temmink is part of the technical staff of the KNVB where he will provide his knowledge and experience to the younger generations of football referees in the Netherlands.
