= List of Dutch football transfers summer 2010 =

This is a list of transfers in Dutch football for the 2010 summer transfer window. Only moves featuring an Eredivisie side and/or an Eerste Divisie side are listed.

The summer transfer window will open on July 1, 2010, and will close on September 1. Deals may be signed at any given moment in the season, but the actual transfer may only take place during the transfer window. Unattached players may sign at any moment.

== Eredivisie ==
=== ADO Den Haag ===
In: Note: Flags indicate national team as defined under FIFA eligibility rules; some limited exceptions apply. Players may hold more than one non-FIFA nationality.

No.	Pos.	Nation	Player
12	MF	SLO	Aleksandar Radosavljević (from (Greece) AEL)
14	DF	NED	Ramon Leeuwin (from AGOVV)
16	DF	NED	Christian Supusepa (from Jong Ajax)
19	FW	RUS	Dmitry Bulykin (on loan from (Belgium) Anderlecht)
28	FW	SVK	František Kubík (from (Slovakia) AS Trenčín)
--	DF	NED	Ahmed Ali (from Alphense Boys)

Out: Note: Flags indicate national team as defined under FIFA eligibility rules; some limited exceptions apply. Players may hold more than one non-FIFA nationality.

No.	Pos.	Nation	Player
7	MF	FRA	Karim Soltani (to (Greece) Iraklis)
9	FW	MNE	Bogdan Milic (to (Russia) Krylia Sovetov Samara)
10	MF	NED	Richard Knopper (released)
13	FW	ANT	Raily Ignacio (on loan to FC Dordrecht)
14	MF	NED	Kees Luijckx (to NAC Breda, was on loan from AZ)
16	GK	NED	Barry Ditewig (to Achilles '29)
17	MF	NED	Yuri Cornelisse (released)
19	FW	EST	Andres Oper (released)
20	DF	SVK	Csaba Horváth (to (Poland) Zagłębie Lubin)
23	MF	NED	Mike de Geer (to HSB)
40	MF	NED	Levi Schwiebbe (to AGOVV)
--	DF	NED	Tom Beugelsdijk (on loan to FC Dordrecht)
--	FW	NED	Berry Powel (to (Spain) Gimnàstic, was on loan to De Graafschap)
--	FW	BEL	Fabio Caracciolo (to Fortuna Sittard, was on loan to FC Den Bosch)

=== AFC Ajax ===
In:

Note: Flags indicate national team as defined under FIFA eligibility rules; some limited exceptions apply. Players may hold more than one non-FIFA nationality.

No.	Pos.	Nation	Player
9	FW	MAR	Mounir El Hamdaoui (from AZ Alkmaar)
13	DF	NED	Andre Ooijer (from PSV Eindhoven)
17	DF	NED	Daley Blind (loan return from FC Groningen)
19	MF	FIN	Teemu Tainio (from (England) Sunderland)
25	MF	NED	Mitchell Donald (loan return from Willem II)
31	FW	CRO	Darko Bodul (loan return from Sparta Rotterdam)
--	FW	EGY	Mido (from (England) Middlesbrough F.C.)

Out: Note: Flags indicate national team as defined under FIFA eligibility rules; some limited exceptions apply. Players may hold more than one non-FIFA nationality.

No.	Pos.	Nation	Player
4	MF	BRA	Zé Eduardo (loan return to (Brazil) Maga)
9	FW	SRB	Marko Pantelić (to (Greece) Olympiacos)
17	DF	NED	Rob Wielaert (on loan to Roda JC)
18	MF	ESP	Gabri (to (Qatar) Umm-Salal)
22	MF	MAR	Ismail Aissati (on loan to Vitesse Arnhem)
24	DF	NED	Jan-Arie van der Heijden (on loan to Willem II, was already on loan)
26	MF	NED	Jeffrey Sarpong (to (Spain) Real Sociedad, was on loan to NEC)
28	MF	DEN	Dennis Rommedahl (to (Greece) Olympiacos)
30	DF	ROU	George Ogăraru (to (Switzerland) FC Sion)
31	GK	NED	Sergio Padt (on loan to Go Ahead Eagles)
32	FW	BRA	Kerlon (loan return to (Italy) Internazionale)
33	FW	NED	Javier Martina (released)
34	MF	SWE	Kennedy Bakircioglu (to (Spain) Racing Santander)
--	FW	ARM	Edgar Manucharyan (to (Armenia) FC Pyunik, was on loan to AGOVV)

=== AZ ===
In: Note: Flags indicate national team as defined under FIFA eligibility rules; some limited exceptions apply. Players may hold more than one non-FIFA nationality.

No.	Pos.	Nation	Player
3	DF	NED	Dirk Marcellis (from PSV)
5	DF	NED	Nick Viergever (from Sparta)
7	MF	NED	Erik Falkenburg (from Sparta)
33	DF	NED	Gijs Luirink (loan return from RKC Waalwijk)
34	GK	CRC	Esteban Alvarado (from (Costa Rica) Saprissa)
35	FW	NED	Charlison Benschop (from RKC Waalwijk)
--	FW	DEN	Morten Nielsen (loan return from (Sweden) Landskrona BoIS)

Out: Note: Flags indicate national team as defined under FIFA eligibility rules; some limited exceptions apply. Players may hold more than one non-FIFA nationality.

No.	Pos.	Nation	Player
6	MF	NED	David Mendes da Silva (to (Austria) Salzburg)
7	FW	NED	Jeremain Lens (to PSV)
10	FW	MAR	Mounir El Hamdaoui (to AFC Ajax)
18	FW	BEL	Mousa Dembélé (to (England) Fulham FC)
19	MF	NED	Kees Luyckx (to NAC Breda)
50	DF	NED	Milano Koenders (on loan to NAC, was on loan to Sparta)
--	GK	NED	Boy Waterman (on loan to De Graafschap)
--	GK	NED	Jordy Deckers (to Jong Ajax, was on loan to Telstar)
--	DF	NED	Jeroen Tesselaar (on loan to Telstar, was already on loan)
--	MF	NED	Kemy Agustien (released, was on loan to RKC Waalwijk)
--	MF	NED	Furdjel Narsingh (on loan to Telstar, was already on loan)
--	MF	NED	Gaston Salasiwa (released, was on loan to Telstar)
--	FW	NED	Kevin Brands (on loan to Telstar, was already on loan)
--	FW	NED	Chevello de Rijp (released, was on loan to FC Groningen)

=== Excelsior ===
In: Note: Flags indicate national team as defined under FIFA eligibility rules; some limited exceptions apply. Players may hold more than one non-FIFA nationality.

No.	Pos.	Nation	Player
1	GK	GRE	Kostas Lamprou (on loan from Jong Feyenoord)
3	DF	NED	Miquel Nelom (on loan from Jong Feyenoord, was already on loan)
4	DF	NED	Wouter Gudde (from RKC Waalwijk)
5	DF	NED	Norichio Nieveld (from Feyenoord, was already on loan)
7	FW	NED	Tim Vincken (from Feyenoord, was already on loan)
12	DF	NED	Tobias Waisapy (from Jong Feyenoord, was already on loan)
13	MF	NED	Kevin Wattamaleo (from Jong Feyenoord, was already on loan)
14	MF	NED	Jerson Anes Ribeiro (from Jong Feyenoord, was already on loan)
15	MF	NED	Jordy Clasie (on loan from Jong Feyenoord)
17	FW	BEL	Nayib Lagouireh (on loan from Jong Feyenoord)
18	FW	BEL	Andréa Fileccia (on loan from Jong Feyenoord)
20	MF	NED	Shabir Isoufi (on loan from Jong Feyenoord)
25	GK	NED	Cees Paauwe (from FC Twente)
26	DF	NED	Kaj Ramsteijn (from Jong Feyenoord)
—	DF	NED	Tim Eekman (on loan from Jong Feyenoord)

Out: Note: Flags indicate national team as defined under FIFA eligibility rules; some limited exceptions apply. Players may hold more than one non-FIFA nationality.

No.	Pos.	Nation	Player
1	GK	NED	Arjan van Dijk (to RKC Waalwijk)
3	DF	NED	Ard van Peppen (to RKC Waalwijk)
4	MF	RSA	Kamohelo Mokotjo (loan return to Feyenoord)
5	DF	CZE	Vojtěch Machek (to Helmond Sport, was on loan from Jong Feyenoord)
9	FW	POL	Michal Janota (loan return to Feyenoord)
10	FW	RSA	Kermit Erasmus (loan return to Feyenoord)
11	FW	NED	Peter de Lange (to BVV Barendrecht)
17	DF	NED	Sigourney Bandjar (to RKC Waalwijk)
20	FW	NED	Luis Pedro (loan return to Jong Feyenoord)
--	MF	NED	Levi Risamasu (released)
--	MF	NED	Samir El Moussaoui (released)
--	FW	NED	Mohammed Faouzi (released)
--	FW	NED	Michel van Guldener (to vv Capelle)
--	FW	NED	Mathijs Benard (to Westlandia)

=== Feyenoord ===
In: Note: Flags indicate national team as defined under FIFA eligibility rules; some limited exceptions apply. Players may hold more than one non-FIFA nationality.

No.	Pos.	Nation	Player
7	MF	NED	Ruben Schaken (from VVV-Venlo)
14	MF	NED	Adil Auassar (from VVV-Venlo)
15	MF	RSA	Kamohelo Mokotjo (loan return from Excelsior)
19	DF	DEN	Michael Lumb (on loan from (Russia) Zenit St. Petersburg)
24	FW	RUS	Fyodor Smolov (on loan from (Russia) Dynamo Moscow)

Out: Note: Flags indicate national team as defined under FIFA eligibility rules; some limited exceptions apply. Players may hold more than one non-FIFA nationality.

No.	Pos.	Nation	Player
3	DF	NED	Kevin Hofland (on loan to (Cyprus) AEK Larnaca)
7	MF	NED	Denny Landzaat (to FC Twente)
8	DF	NED	Giovanni van Bronckhorst (retired)
9	FW	NED	Roy Makaay (retired)
15	MF	SRB	Stefan Babović (loan return to (France) FC Nantes)
24	FW	NED	Mitchell Schet (to RKC Waalwijk)
29	FW	RSA	Kermit Erasmus (to (South Africa) SuperSport United, was on loan to Excelsior)
33	MF	NED	Jonathan de Guzmán (to (Spain) Real Mallorca)
–	DF	NED	Norichio Nieveld (to Excelsior, was already on loan)
—	DF	CZE	Vojtěch Machek (to Helmond Sport, was on loan to Excelsior)
—	MF	POL	Michal Janota (to Go Ahead Eagles, was on loan to Excelsior)
—	MF	NED	Jerson Anes Ribeiro (to Excelsior, was already on loan)
—	MF	NED	Kevin Wattamaleo (to Excelsior, was already on loan)
–	FW	NED	Tim Vincken (to SBV Excelsior, was already on loan)
—	FW	NED	Hanne Hagary (to Almere City FC)
—	FW	NED	Jordao Pattinama (to Feyenoord AV)
—	FW	NED	Luís Pedro (to Go Ahead Eagles, was on loan to Excelsior)

=== De Graafschap ===
In: Note: Flags indicate national team as defined under FIFA eligibility rules; some limited exceptions apply. Players may hold more than one non-FIFA nationality.

No.	Pos.	Nation	Player
3	DF	NED	Vito Wormgoor (from FC Utrecht, was already on loan)
4	DF	NED	Jan-Paul Saeijs (from Roda JC)
9	FW	NED	Rydell Poepon (from Sparta Rotterdam)
10	MF	NED	Youssouf Hersi (from (Greece) AEK Athens)
12	GK	NED	Boy Waterman (on loan from AZ)
29	FW	NED	Yuri Rose (from Sparta Rotterdam, was already on loan)

Out: Note: Flags indicate national team as defined under FIFA eligibility rules; some limited exceptions apply. Players may hold more than one non-FIFA nationality.

No.	Pos.	Nation	Player
6	MF	NED	Joep van den Ouweland (to Go Ahead Eagles)
7	MF	NED	Martijn Meerdink (retired)
9	FW	NED	Jhon van Beukering (to Go Ahead Eagles, was on loan from NEC)
10	FW	NED	Berry Powel (loan return to ADO Den Haag)
12	GK	NED	Mustafa Amezrine (released)
16	FW	NED	Abdelhali Chaiat (to AGOVV)
19	DF	NED	Cerezo Fung a Wing (to IJsselmeervogels)
28	MF	NED	Mees Siers (to AGOVV)
31	MF	NED	Roy Terschegget (to GVVV)
--	MF	NED	Marcel van der Sloot (to RBC, was on loan to FC Dordrecht)
—	DF	NED	Sven Spekkink (to Go Ahead Eagles)

=== FC Groningen ===
In: Note: Flags indicate national team as defined under FIFA eligibility rules; some limited exceptions apply. Players may hold more than one non-FIFA nationality.

No.	Pos.	Nation	Player
2	MF	NED	Maikel Kieftenbeld (from Go Ahead Eagles)
3	DF	NED	Jonas Ivens (from (Belgium) KV Mechelen)
10	MF	SRB	Dušan Tadić (from (Serbia) FK Vojvodina)
16	MF	ESP	Gonzalo García (loan return from VVV-Venlo)
19	DF	NED	Shkodran Metaj (loan return from RKC Waalwijk)
21	DF	NED	Jeroen Veldmate (loan return from Helmond Sport)
—	GK	NED	Renze Fij (from Jong FC Twente, was on loan to Go Ahead Eagles)
—	DF	NED	Virgil van Dijk (from FC Groningen)
—	MF	NED	Tim Keurntjes (from De Graafschap)

Out: Note: Flags indicate national team as defined under FIFA eligibility rules; some limited exceptions apply. Players may hold more than one non-FIFA nationality.

No.	Pos.	Nation	Player
2	DF	BEL	Sepp De Roover (to (Belgium) Sporting Lokeren)
3	DF	SLE	Gibril Sankoh (to (Germany) FC Augsburg)
4	DF	NED	Michael Jansen (on loan to Veendam, was on loan to Go Ahead)
6	DF	NED	Mike Zonneveld (loan return to PSV Eindhoven)
9	FW	DEN	Morten Nordstrand (loan return to (Denmark) FCK)
10	MF	SRB	Goran Lovre (to (England) Barnsley)
12	DF	CZE	Ondrej Svejdik (released)
16	FW	NED	Serhat Koç (on loan to SC Cambuur)
17	DF	NED	Theo Lucius (to FC Den Bosch)
18	DF	NED	Daley Blind (loan return to AFC Ajax)
47	FW	NED	Frank Olijve (to FC Zwolle)
49	FW	NED	Pepijn Kluin (to FC Zwolle)

=== SC Heerenveen ===
In: Note: Flags indicate national team as defined under FIFA eligibility rules; some limited exceptions apply. Players may hold more than one non-FIFA nationality.

No.	Pos.	Nation	Player
2	DF	CZE	Milan Kopic (loan return from (Czech Republic) Slavia Prague)
5	DF	MAR	Youssef El-Akchaoui (from NEC)
8	DF	NED	Arnold Kruiswijk (from (Belgium) Anderlecht, was on loan to Roda JC)
12	FW	NED	Bas Dost (from Heracles)
13	FW	NOR	Tarik Elyounoussi (loan return from (Norway) Lillestrøm)
16	GK	DEN	Kevin Stuhr-Ellegaard (from (Denmark) Randers FC)
23	DF	NED	Calvin Jong-a-Pin (loan return from Vitesse Arnhem)
26	GK	NED	René Oosterhof (from FC Zwolle)
40	MF	NED	Rico Wolven (loan return from FC Emmen)
—	MF	ISL	Ingolfur Sigurdsson (from (Iceland) KR Reykjavík)
—	MF	NED	Faysel Shayesteh (from Jong FC Twente)

Out: Note: Flags indicate national team as defined under FIFA eligibility rules; some limited exceptions apply. Players may hold more than one non-FIFA nationality.

No.	Pos.	Nation	Player
3	DF	DEN	Kristian Bak Nielsen (to (Denmark) FC Midtjylland)
5	DF	NED	Michael Dingsdag (to (Switzerland) FC Sion)
12	FW	BRA	Paulo Henrique (to (Brazil) Palmeiras)
19	FW	CPV	Cecilio Lopes (to FC Dordrecht, was on loan to FC Zwolle)
20	DF	MKD	Goran Popov (to (Ukraine) Dynamo Kyiv)
22	DF	NED	Henrico Drost (to RKC Waalwijk, was on loan to VVV-Venlo)
23	MF	ARG	Hernán Losada (loan return to (Belgium) Anderlecht)
24	GK	CZE	Martin Lejsal (loan return to (Czech Republic) Brno)
26	GK	NED	Henk Timmer (released)
31	FW	ISL	Arnór Smárason (to (Denmark) Esbjerg)
30	DF	NED	Bart de Graaf (on loan to FC Emmen, was already on loan)
32	DF	NED	Richard Stolte (on loan to FC Emmen, was already on loan)
34	DF	NED	Johnny de Vries (on loan to FC Emmen, was already on loan)
35	FW	NED	Gerald Sibon (to (Australia) Melbourne Heart FC)
44	MF	POL	Pawel Wojciechowski (to Willem II)
--	GK	NED	Harm Zeinstra (on loan to Emmen, was already on loan)
--	FW	NED	Xander Houtkoop (to Heracles, was on loan to FC Emmen)
--	FW	NED	Michel Poldervaart (to Emmen, was already on loan)
--	MF	MAR	Soufian Akouili (released, was on loan to FC Emmen)
--	DF	NED	Arjen Bergsma (to Harkemase Boys, was on loan to FC Emmen)
--	GK	IRI	Agil Etemadi (to BV Veendam)
--	DF	MAR	Hassan Bai Kamara (released, was on loan to FC Emmen)

=== Heracles Almelo ===
In: Note: Flags indicate national team as defined under FIFA eligibility rules; some limited exceptions apply. Players may hold more than one non-FIFA nationality.

No.	Pos.	Nation	Player
9	FW	SVK	Andrej Rendla (on loan from FC Twente)
12	FW	NED	Glynor Plet (from Telstar)
14	MF	NED	Ben Rienstra (from Jong AZ)
22	GK	NED	Remko Pasveer (loan return from Go Ahead Eagles)
25	GK	NED	Nick Hengelman (from Jong FC Twente/Heracles)
27	FW	NED	Xander Houtkoop (from SC Heerenveen, was on loan to FC Emmen)
30	FW	NED	Anmar Almubaraki (from Jong FC Twente/Heracles)
33	MF	NED	Alexander Bannink (on loan from FC Twente)

Out: Note: Flags indicate national team as defined under FIFA eligibility rules; some limited exceptions apply. Players may hold more than one non-FIFA nationality.

No.	Pos.	Nation	Player
1	GK	GER	Martin Pieckenhagen (to (Germany) FSV Mainz)
7	MF	CAN	Andrew Ornoch (to BV Veendam)
9	FW	CZE	Vojtěch Schulmeister (released)
12	FW	NED	Bas Dost (to SC Heerenveen)
14	MF	GER	Elias Pech (retired)
16	GK	NED	Jörg van Nieuwenhuijzen (to Hoek)
19	FW	FIN	Juha Hakola (to Willem II)
20	FW	NED	Sebastiaan Steur (to SV Spakenburg)
24	DF	CRO	Denis Mangafić (released)
25	GK	NED	Maikel Kampjes (to Quick '20)
27	MF	NED	Dennis Rosink (to Excelsior '31)
30	MF	NED	Qays Shayesteh (to BV Veendam)
33	FW	NED	Paddy John (to RKC Waalwijk)

=== NAC Breda ===
In: Note: Flags indicate national team as defined under FIFA eligibility rules; some limited exceptions apply. Players may hold more than one non-FIFA nationality.

No.	Pos.	Nation	Player
2	DF	NED	Milano Koenders (on loan from AZ Alkmaar)
7	MF	NED	Kees Luyckx (from AZ Alkmaar)
9	FW	MAR	Ali Boussaboun (from (United Arab Emirates) Al Nasr)
17	DF	HUN	Gábor Horváth (on loan from (Hungary) Videoton FC)
19	FW	NED	Fouad Idabdelhay (loan return from RKC Waalwijk)
21	GK	NED	Gino Mommers (from RBC Roosendaal)
22	DF	NED	Jens Janse (form Willem II)
25	MF	NED	Marvin van der Pluijm (from FC Den Bosch)

Out: Note: Flags indicate national team as defined under FIFA eligibility rules; some limited exceptions apply. Players may hold more than one non-FIFA nationality.

No.	Pos.	Nation	Player
2	DF	NED	Kurt Elshot (released)
4	DF	NED	Patrick Zwaanswijk (to (Australia) Central Coast Mariners)
5	DF	NED	Kees Kwakman (to (Germany) FC Augsburg)
7	MF	NED	Edwin de Graaf (to (Scotland) Hibernian)
8	MF	NED	Tommie van der Leegte (retired)
15	FW	NED	Martijn Reuser (released)
20	FW	NED	Ellery Cairo (released)
22	MF	ESP	Enric Vallès Prat (to (England) Birmingham)
24	FW	NED	Rogier Veenstra (to Hoek)
25	GK	NED	Johan Jansen (to Almere City FC)
27	FW	NED	Edinho Pattinama (released)
30	MF	NED	Ali Benomar (released)
32	DF	NED	Tim Hofstede (to FC Den Bosch)
33	DF	NED	Benjamin van Wanrooy (to VV Baronie)
35	GK	NED	Tim Coremans (released)

=== NEC ===
In: Note: Flags indicate national team as defined under FIFA eligibility rules; some limited exceptions apply. Players may hold more than one non-FIFA nationality.

No.	Pos.	Nation	Player
5	DF	FRA	Rémy Amieux (from FC Eindhoven)
6	MF	DEN	Niki Zimling (on loan from (Italy) Udinese)
7	FW	SUR	Leroy George (from FC Utrecht)
11	FW	BEL	Thomas Chatelle (on loan from (Belgium) Anderlecht)
17	MF	BIH	Adnan Secerovic (on loan from Roda JC)
19	DF	NED	Nathaniël Will (from Jong Ajax)
23	GK	NED	Marco van Duin (from FC Volendam)
25	DF	NED	Joost Ebergen (loan return from FC Oss)
--	DF	CZE	Pavel Čmovč (from (Czech Republic) Slavia Prague)

Out: Note: Flags indicate national team as defined under FIFA eligibility rules; some limited exceptions apply. Players may hold more than one non-FIFA nationality.

No.	Pos.	Nation	Player
4	MF	ANG	Dominique Kivuvu (to (Romania) CFR Cluj)
5	DF	MAR	Youssef El Akchaoui (to SC Heerenveen)
6	DF	NED	Patrick Pothuizen (to De Treffers)
7	FW	NED	Rutger Worm (to (Australia) Melbourne Heart).
9	MF	NED	Jeffrey Sarpong (loan return to AFC Ajax)
17	FW	BDI	Saidi Ntibazonkiza (to (Poland) Cracovia)
19	MF	NED	Mitchell Burgzorg (released)
22	DF	NED	Jeroen Heubach (loan return to FC Twente)
23	MF	POL	Arek Radomski (to (Poland) Cracovia)
24	MF	NED	Joey Brock (to RBC Roosendaal)
25	GK	NED	Rein Baart (to (Canada) FC Edmonton)
30	GK	USA	Nicholas Skverer (release)
36	MF	GER	Bastian Weiser (released)
--	DF	CZE	Pavel Čmovč (on loan to BV Veendam)
--	FW	NED	Moestafa El Kabir (to (Sweden) Mjällby AIF)
--	FW	NED	Jhon van Beukering (to Go Ahead, was on loan to De Graafschap)

=== PSV ===
In: Note: Flags indicate national team as defined under FIFA eligibility rules; some limited exceptions apply. Players may hold more than one non-FIFA nationality.

No.	Pos.	Nation	Player
2	DF	BRA	Marcelo (from (Poland) Wisła Kraków)
5	DF	SRB	Jagoš Vuković (from (Serbia) Rad, was already on loan)
6	FW	SWE	Marcus Berg (on loan from (Germany) Hamburger SV)
9	FW	NED	Jeremain Lens (from AZ Alkmaar)
13	MF	CAN	Atiba Hutchinson (from (Denmark) FC Copenhagen)
16	FW	NED	Stef Nijland (loan return from Willem II)
18	DF	NED	Wilfred Bouma (from (England) Aston Villa)
24	MF	SRB	Milos Đorđević (from (Serbia) Radnički)
29	FW	NED	Género Zeefuik (loan return from FC Dordrecht)
30	FW	BRA	Jonathan Reis (free agent)

Out: Note: Flags indicate national team as defined under FIFA eligibility rules; some limited exceptions apply. Players may hold more than one non-FIFA nationality.

No.	Pos.	Nation	Player
3	DF	MEX	Carlos Salcido (to (England) Fulham F.C.)
5	MF	NED	Mike Zonneveld (to (Cyprus) AEL Limassol, was on loan to FC Groningen)
6	MF	BEL	Timmy Simons (to (Germany) 1. FC Nürnberg)
8	FW	NED	Andy van der Meyde (released)
17	FW	PER	Reimond Manco (to (Peru) Juan Aurich, was already on loan)
19	DF	NED	Steve Olfers (to (Azerbaijan) FC Gabala)
21	GK	NED	Bas Roorda (retired)
23	DF	NED	André Ooijer (to AFC Ajax)
24	DF	NED	Dirk Marcellis (to AZ Alkmaar)
39	FW	NED	Nigel Hasselbaink (to (Scotland) Hamilton, was on loan to Go Ahead)

=== Roda JC ===
In: Note: Flags indicate national team as defined under FIFA eligibility rules; some limited exceptions apply. Players may hold more than one non-FIFA nationality.

No.	Pos.	Nation	Player
5	DF	BEL	Jimmy Hempte (from (Belgium) K.V. Kortrijk)
9	FW	DEN	Mads Junker (from Vitesse Arnhem, was already on loan)
11	FW	DEN	Morten Skoubo (on loan from FC Utrecht, was already on loan)
12	DF	NED	Eelco Horsten (from Jong PSV)
14	DF	NED	Rob Wielaert (on loan from Ajax)
16	FW	BEL	Stijn Huysegems (on loan from (Belgium) RC Genk)
21	GK	POL	Mateusz Prus (from (Poland) Zaglebie Sosnowiec)

Out: Note: Flags indicate national team as defined under FIFA eligibility rules; some limited exceptions apply. Players may hold more than one non-FIFA nationality.

No.	Pos.	Nation	Player
1	GK	BEL	Bram Castro (released)
7	MF	NED	Edwin Linssen (to (Cyprus) AEK Larnaca, was on loan to Fortuna)
12	DF	BEL	Kris de Wree (to (Belgium) Lierse SK)
15	DF	NED	Arnold Kruiswijk (to SC Heerenveen, was on loan from (Belgium) Anderlecht)
16	FW	BEL	Jamaïque Vandamme (to (Belgium) RAEC Mons)
17	DF	CAN	Marcel de Jong (to (Germany) FC Augsburg)
20	DF	NED	Jan-Paul Saeijs (De Graafschap)
21	DF	NED	Kjell Knops (to EVV)
23	DF	BIH	Adnan Secerovic (on loan to NEC Nijmegen)
24	FW	NED	Harrie Gommans (released, was on loan to Fortuna Sittard)
30	GK	BEL	Cliff Mardulier (released)

=== FC Twente ===
In: Note: Flags indicate national team as defined under FIFA eligibility rules; some limited exceptions apply. Players may hold more than one non-FIFA nationality.

No.	Pos.	Nation	Player
5	DF	SWE	Rasmus Bengtsson (from (Germany) Hertha BSC)
7	MF	NED	Denny Landzaat (from Feyenoord)
11	FW	SWE	Emir Bajrami (from (Sweden) IF Elfsborg)
13	GK	BUL	Nikolay Mihaylov (from (England) Liverpool F.C., was already on loan)
15	DF	VEN	Roberto Rosales (from (Belgium) AA Gent)
16	GK	NED	Wilko de Vogt (from FC Oss)
20	MF	BEL	Nacer Chadli (from AGOVV)
22	FW	AUT	Marc Janko (from (Austria) Salzburg)
23	DF	BEL	Bart Buysse (from (Belgium) Zulte Waregem)
--	MF	BRA	Bruno Smith (from (Brazil) América)

Out: Note: Flags indicate national team as defined under FIFA eligibility rules; some limited exceptions apply. Players may hold more than one non-FIFA nationality.

No.	Pos.	Nation	Player
2	DF	AUS	David Carney (to (England) Blackpool F.C.)
5	DF	SRB	Slobodan Rajković (on loan to Vitesse Arnhem, was on loan from (England) Chelsea)
7	FW	AZE	Vagif Javadov (on loan to FK Baku)
8	DF	NED	Ronnie Stam (to (England) Wigan Athletic F.C.)
9	FW	SUI	Blaise Nkufo (to (United States) Seattle Sounders F.C.)
10	MF	DEN	Kenneth Perez (retired)
11	FW	AUS	Nikita Rukavytsya (to (Germany) Hertha BSC, was on loan to (Belgium) Roeselare)
15	MF	SVK	Miroslav Stoch (to (Turkey) Fenerbahçe, was on loan from (England) Chelsea)
16	GK	NED	Cees Paauwe (to Excelsior)
17	FW	BRA	Wellington (loan return to (Germany) TSG Hoffenheim)
17	MF	NED	Alexander Bannink (on loan to Heracles)
18	MF	CIV	Cheick Tioté (to (England) Newcastle United)
21	FW	AUT	Marko Arnautović (to (Germany) Werder Bremen, was on loan to (Italy) Inter)
22	DF	NED	Jeroen Heubach (retired)
23	MF	IRQ	Nashat Akram (released)
25	FW	SVK	Andrej Rendla (on loan to Heracles)
28	FW	GHA	Ransford Osei (loan return to (Israel) Maccabi Haifa)
32	FW	NED	Jules Reimerink (to (Germany) Energie Cottbus, was on loan to Go Ahead)
--	GK	NED	Renze Fij (to Jong FC Groningen, was on loan to Go Ahead Eagles)
--	DF	NED	Wout Droste (to Go Ahead Eagles)
--	MF	GER	Theo Vogelsang (on loan to Go Ahead Eagles)
--	MF	AFG	Faysel Shayesteh (to Jong SC Heerenveen)
--	MF	NED	Tjaronn Chery (on loan to FC Emmen, was on loan to RBC)
—	FW	NED	Lesley Nahrwold (released, was on loan to RBC Roosendaal)
--	FW	NED	Patrick Gerritsen (on loan to Go Ahead Eagles, was already on loan)
--	FW	NED	Romano Denneboom (released, was on loan to Sparta Rotterdam)

=== FC Utrecht ===
In: Note: Flags indicate national team as defined under FIFA eligibility rules; some limited exceptions apply. Players may hold more than one non-FIFA nationality.

No.	Pos.	Nation	Player
7	FW	FRA	Edouard Duplan (from Sparta Rotterdam)
10	FW	AUS	Tommy Oar (from (Australia) Brisbane Roar)
12	FW	NED	Frank Demouge (from Willem II)
26	MF	AUS	Michael Zullo (from (Australia) Brisbane Roar)
30	MF	AUS	Adam Sarota (from (Australia) Brisbane Roar)

Out: Note: Flags indicate national team as defined under FIFA eligibility rules; some limited exceptions apply. Players may hold more than one non-FIFA nationality.

No.	Pos.	Nation	Player
5	DF	GHA	Francis Dickoh (to (Scotland) Hibernian F.C.)
6	MF	NED	Gregoor van Dijk (to (Cyprus) AEK Larnaca)
7	FW	FRA	Loïc Loval (to (France) Vannes)
12	FW	BEL	Kevin Vandenbergh (to (Belgium) AS Eupen)
14	FW	DEN	Morten Skoubo (on loan to Roda JC, was already on loan)
23	MF	BEL	Hans Somers (released)
20	FW	NED	Gregory Schaken (released)
21	FW	SUR	Leroy George (to NEC)
25	DF	NED	Vito Wormgoor (to De Graafschap, was already on loan)
26	MF	BEL	Ken van Mierlo (to RBC Roosendaal)
28	GK	NED	André Krul (on loan to Sparta Rotterdam)
34	DF	NED	Jahmill Flu (to RBC Roosendaal)
41	MF	NED	Frank van der Zwan (to Go Ahead Eagles)
50	MF	NED	Rafael Uiterloo (released)
--	DF	NED	Mike van der Kooy (to AGOVV, was on loan to FC Oss)

=== Vitesse ===
In: Note: Flags indicate national team as defined under FIFA eligibility rules; some limited exceptions apply. Players may hold more than one non-FIFA nationality.

No.	Pos.	Nation	Player
1	GK	CRO	Matej Delac (on loan from (England) Chelsea)
6	DF	NED	Frank van der Struijk (loan return from Willem II)
7	MF	MAR	Ismail Aissati (on loan from Ajax)
13	MF	SRB	Nemanja Matić (on loan from (England) Chelsea)
14	DF	SRB	Slobodan Rajković (on loan from (England) Chelsea, was on loan to FC Twente)
16	DF	GEO	Guram Kashia (from (Georgia (country)) Dinamo Tbilisi)
17	DF	NED	Genaro Snijders (loan return from Almere City FC)
18	MF	GHA	Larry Kingston (from (Scotland) Hearts)
19	FW	NOR	Marcus Pedersen (from (Norway) Strømsgodset IF)
20	FW	NED	Nacer Barazite (on loan from (England) Arsenal F.C.)
21	DF	ITA	Luca Caldirola (on loan from (Italy) Internazionale)
27	FW	NED	Julian Jenner (loan return from (Germany) Rot-Weiss Ahlen)

Out: Note: Flags indicate national team as defined under FIFA eligibility rules; some limited exceptions apply. Players may hold more than one non-FIFA nationality.

No.	Pos.	Nation	Player
1	GK	NED	Piet Velthuizen (to (Spain) Hércules CF)
2	DF	NED	Paul Verhaegh (to (Germany) FC Augsburg)
7	MF	BRA	Claudemir (to (Denmark) FC Copenhagen)
10	FW	NED	Santi Kolk (to (Germany) Union Berlin)
15	MF	NED	Serginho Greene (released)
18	MF	BEL	Onur Kaya (to (Belgium) Charleroi SC)
19	FW	NED	Anduele Pryor (released, was on loan to (Belgium) SV Roeselare)
20	DF	NED	Calvin Jong-a-Pin (loan return to SC Heerenveen)
21	GK	NED	Ronald Graafland (released)
23	DF	NED	Jop van der Linden (to Helmond Sport, was on loan to AGOVV)
24	FW	DEN	Mads Junker (to Roda JC)
30	MF	NED	Nicky Hofs (to (Cyprus) AEL Limassol)
36	DF	NED	Giovanni Gravenbeek (to Willem II)

=== VVV Venlo ===
In: Note: Flags indicate national team as defined under FIFA eligibility rules; some limited exceptions apply. Players may hold more than one non-FIFA nationality.

No.	Pos.	Nation	Player
7	MF	NED	Bryan Linssen (from MVV)
8	FW	POR	Jorge Chula (on loan from (Portugal) F.C. Porto)
10	MF	POR	Josué (on loan from (Portugal) F.C. Porto)
19	FW	NED	Rachid Ofrany (loan return from AGOVV Apeldoorn)
21	FW	POR	Diogo Viana (on loan from (Portugal) F.C. Porto, was already on loan)
25	FW	NED	Rick Verbeek (loan return from Helmond Sport)
29	MF	HUN	Balász Tóth (on loan from (Belgium) RC Genk)

Out: Note: Flags indicate national team as defined under FIFA eligibility rules; some limited exceptions apply. Players may hold more than one non-FIFA nationality.

No.	Pos.	Nation	Player
3	DF	NED	Sjors Verdellen (to MVV)
7	MF	NED	Ruben Schaken (to Feyenoord)
8	MF	BEL	Kevin Van Dessel (to (Cyprus) APOP Kinyras)
9	FW	NED	Sandro Calabro (to (Switzerland) FC St. Gallen)
10	MF	ESP	Gonzalo García (loan return to FC Groningen)
18	MF	NED	Adil Auassar (to Feyenoord)
22	GK	GER	Robert Böhm (released)
24	FW	NED	Soufiane Dadda (on loan to Fortuna Sittard)
25	MF	NED	Jasar Takak (released)
26	DF	NED	Henrico Drost (loan return to SC Heerenveen)
30	GK	BEL	Ruud Boffin (loan return to MVV)

=== Willem II ===
In: Note: Flags indicate national team as defined under FIFA eligibility rules; some limited exceptions apply. Players may hold more than one non-FIFA nationality.

No.	Pos.	Nation	Player
2	DF	NED	Giovanni Gravenbeek (from Vitesse)
5	DF	FIN	Veli Lampi (from (Switzerland) FC Zürich)
7	FW	FIN	Juha Hakola (from Heracles)
8	MF	UKR	Evgeniy Levchenko (from (Russia) Saturn Moscow)
9	FW	NED	Maceo Rigters (on loan from Blackburn Rovers)
10	MF	SWE	Andreas Landgren (on loan from (Italy) Udinese)
11	FW	NED	Rowin van Zaanen (from FC Volendam)
14	MF	POL	Pawel Wojciechowski (from SC Heerenveen)
16	MF	NED	Niek Vossebelt (from FC Zwolle)
17	MF	NED	Jan-Arie van der Heijden (on loan from AFC Ajax, was already on loan)
18	MF	NED	Ricardo Ippel (from Jong Willem II)
21	GK	BEL	Davino Verhulst (on loan from RC Genk)
22	FW	NED	Lars Hutten (from Jong PSV)
23	MF	AUT	Andreas Lasnik (from (Germany) Alemannia Aachen)
31	GK	NED	Harmen Kuperus (free agent)
—	DF	SLO	Denis Halilovic (on loan from (Russia) Saturn Moscow)

Out: Note: Flags indicate national team as defined under FIFA eligibility rules; some limited exceptions apply. Players may hold more than one non-FIFA nationality.

No.	Pos.	Nation	Player
1	GK	NED	Maikel Aerts (to (Germany) Hertha BSC)
2	DF	NED	Jens Janse (to NAC Breda)
6	MF	GER	Mehmet Akgün (to (Turkey) Gençlerbirligi)
7	MF	ANT	Boy Deul (to (Germany) FC Bayern Munich II)
8	MF	BEL	Christophe Grégoire (released)
9	FW	NED	Frank Demouge (to FC Utrecht)
10	MF	MAR	Saïd Boutahar (released)
11	FW	BEL	Ratko Vansimpsen (to FC Eindhoven)
14	FW	NED	Sergio Zijler (released)
15	FW	NED	Ronnie Reniers (to FC Den Bosch)
16	DF	NED	Bas van Loon (to VV Baronie)
18	MF	NED	Paul Quasten (released)
21	DF	NED	Daan van Dinter (to FC Den Bosch)
22	DF	SLE	Ibrahim Kargbo (to (Azerbaijan) FK Baku)
23	FW	NED	Sidney Schmeltz (to Almere City FC)
24	MF	NED	Mitchell Donald (loan return to AFC Ajax)
25	DF	NED	Marciano Bruma (to (Poland) Arka Gdynia)
26	GK	NED	Ariën Pietersma (released)
29	FW	NED	Stef Nijland (loan return to PSV Eindhoven)
31	DF	NED	Frank van der Struijk (loan return to Vitesse Arnhem)
--	DF	NED	Virgil van Dijk (to FC Groningen)

== Eerste Divisie ==
=== AGOVV Apeldoorn ===
In: Note: Flags indicate national team as defined under FIFA eligibility rules; some limited exceptions apply. Players may hold more than one non-FIFA nationality.

No.	Pos.	Nation	Player
7	FW	NED	Uğur Yıldırım (from (Turkey) Kasimpasa SK)
9	FW	NED	Michiel Hemmen (from BV Veendam)
11	MF	NED	Julius Wille (from (United States) Dayton Dutch Lions)
13	MF	NED	Levi Schwiebbe (from ADO Den Haag)
14	DF	ANT	Angelo Martha (from FC Den Bosch)
16	FW	BEL	Jasson Conrad (from (Belgium) AS Eupen)
17	FW	NED	Soufiane Laghmouchi (from Jong Vitesse/AGOVV)
18	MF	NED	Mees Siers (from De Graafschap)
19	DF	NED	Mike van der Kooy (from FC Utrecht, was on loan to FC Oss)
20	FW	NED	Ingmar Maayen (from Jong FC Utrecht)
21	GK	NED	Roy Pistoor (from AFC '34)
22	FW	MAR	Abdelhali Chaiat (from De Graafschap)

Out: Note: Flags indicate national team as defined under FIFA eligibility rules; some limited exceptions apply. Players may hold more than one non-FIFA nationality.

No.	Pos.	Nation	Player
2	DF	NED	Ramon Leeuwin (to ADO Den Haag)
3	DF	BEL	Chiró N'Toko (released)
5	DF	NED	Hesdey Suart (to (Poland) Cracovia)
9	FW	NED	Hans van de Haar (to (United States) Dayton Dutch Lions).
10	MF	BEL	Nacer Chadli (to FC Twente)
11	FW	NED	Jeremy Bokila (to (Belgium) Zulte-Waregem)
13	DF	NED	Gaetan Klaassen (released)
14	DF	NED	Koen Garritsen (to De Treffers)
15	MF	NED	Olaf Lindenbergh (to FC Volendam)
16	DF	NED	Jop van der Linden (loan return to Vitesse Arnhem)
17	FW	NED	Rachid Ofrany (loan return to VVV-Venlo)
18	MF	NED	René van Dieren (to Sparta)
19	MF	NED	Henk Baum (to WHC)
20	MF	MAR	Mohammed Benlahcen (released)
22	FW	ARM	Edgar Manucharyan (loan return to Jong Ajax)
24	FW	NED	Wim Bokila (released)
25	DF	BEL	Jeroen Van den Broeck (released)
26	DF	NED	Remon de Vries (to WHC)

=== Almere City FC ===
In: Note: Flags indicate national team as defined under FIFA eligibility rules; some limited exceptions apply. Players may hold more than one non-FIFA nationality.

No.	Pos.	Nation	Player
—	GK	NED	Erwin Friebel (from RBC, was already on loan)
—	GK	NED	Johan Jansen (from NAC Breda)
—	DF	NED	René Osei Kofi (on loan from Jong Ajax)
—	MF	NED	Luciano Dompig (from BV Veendam)
—	FW	NED	Hanne Hagary (from Jong Feyenoord)
—	FW	NED	Jeffrey Dekker (on loan from Jong Ajax)
—	FW	MAR	Karim Fachtali (from FC Oss, was already on loan)
—	FW	NED	Sidney Schmeltz (from Willem II)
—	FW	NED	Christian Gandu (free agent)

Out: Note: Flags indicate national team as defined under FIFA eligibility rules; some limited exceptions apply. Players may hold more than one non-FIFA nationality.

No.	Pos.	Nation	Player
—	GK	NED	Kevin Rijnvis (released)
—	GK	NED	Nick Vervoort (released)
—	DF	NED	Cendrino Misidjan (to FC Oss)
—	DF	SVK	Tomáš Peciar (loan return to (Slovakia) AS Trenčín)
—	DF	NED	Wilco Krimp (released)
—	MF	NED	Sander Duits (to RKC)
—	MF	BEL	Robbie Haemhouts (to Helmond Sport)
—	MF	NED	Mitchell Kappenberg (to HHC Hardenberg)
—	MF	NED	Richard Haklander (to VVA '71, was on loan to FC Oss)
—	MF	NED	Kevin van Essen (released)
—	MF	NED	Miquel Welles (released)
—	FW	ARG	David Depetris (loan return to (Slovakia) AS Trenčín)
—	FW	NED	Genaro Snijders (loan return to Vitesse Arnhem)
—	FW	NED	Reginald Faria (released)
—	FW	NED	Arsenio Snijders (released)
—	FW	NED	Ridouan Tabaouni (released)
—	FW	NED	Chakib Tayeb (released)

=== SC Cambuur ===
In: Note: Flags indicate national team as defined under FIFA eligibility rules; some limited exceptions apply. Players may hold more than one non-FIFA nationality.

No.	Pos.	Nation	Player
15	DF	SVK	Zdenko Kaprálik (from FC Zwolle)
26	FW	NED	Serhat Koç (on loan from FC Groningen)

Out: Note: Flags indicate national team as defined under FIFA eligibility rules; some limited exceptions apply. Players may hold more than one non-FIFA nationality.

No.	Pos.	Nation	Player
7	FW	NED	Jeffrey de Visscher (to FC Emmen)
15	FW	NED	Rence van der Wal (released, was on loan to FC Oss)
16	MF	NED	Dave Huymans (on loan to FC Dordrecht)
17	FW	CMR	Marc Mboua (to (Egypt) Ittihad, was on loan to Fortuna Sittard)
22	GK	NED	Ale Geert de Vries (released)
23	DF	NED	Jos van Nieuwstadt (to Hoek)
26	DF	NED	Ale de Boer (to Harkemase Boys)
29	FW	NED	Ruud ter Heide (to FC Emmen, was already on loan)
30	DF	NED	Geoffrey Meye (to SV Spakenburg)
31	DF	NED	Paul Bergtop (released)
--	DF	NED	Chris de Wagt (to ONS Sneek, was on loan to Emmen)

=== FC Den Bosch ===
In: Note: Flags indicate national team as defined under FIFA eligibility rules; some limited exceptions apply. Players may hold more than one non-FIFA nationality.

No.	Pos.	Nation	Player
3	DF	NED	Daan van Dinter (from Willem II)
5	DF	NED	Tim Hofstede (from NAC Breda)
9	FW	NED	John Verhoek (from FC Dordrecht)
15	FW	NED	Ronnie Reniers (from Willem II)
19	DF	NED	Theo Lucius (from FC Groningen)
20	FW	NED	Istvan Bakx (on loan from (Belgium) RC Genk)

Out: Note: Flags indicate national team as defined under FIFA eligibility rules; some limited exceptions apply. Players may hold more than one non-FIFA nationality.

No.	Pos.	Nation	Player
5	MF	NED	Stef Wijlaars (to (Slovakia) FK Senica)
9	FW	BEL	Fabio Caracciolo (to Fortuna Sittard, was on loan from ADO Den Haag)
11	FW	ANG	Diangi Matusiwa (to (Cyprus) APOP Kinyras)
14	DF	ANT	Angelo Martha (to AGOVV)
19	FW	NED	Abid El Idrissi (released)
20	MF	NED	Marvin van der Pluijm (to NAC Breda)
21	FW	NED	Paul Jans (to (Belgium) FCV Dender)
23	DF	NED	Benny Kerstens (released)
25	FW	NED	Abdenasser El Khayati (to Jong NAC)

=== FC Dordrecht ===
In: Note: Flags indicate national team as defined under FIFA eligibility rules; some limited exceptions apply. Players may hold more than one non-FIFA nationality.

No.	Pos.	Nation	Player
—	DF	NED	Bart van Hintum (from FC Oss)
—	DF	NED	Ridny Cairo (from Jong PSV)
—	DF	NED	Tom Beugelsdijk (on loan from ADO Den Haag)
—	MF	NED	Dave Huymans (on loan from SC Cambuur)
—	MF	TUR	Tayfun Candan (from Jong Ajax)
—	FW	CPV	Cecilio Lopes (from SC Heerenveen, was on loan to FC Zwolle)
—	FW	ANT	Raily Ignacio (on loan from ADO Den Haag)
—	FW	NED	Erik Quekel (from FC Oss)
—	FW	NED	Renaldo Jongebloet (from Jong Ajax)
—	FW	SRB	Vlatko Lazic (from Jong Ajax)

Out: Note: Flags indicate national team as defined under FIFA eligibility rules; some limited exceptions apply. Players may hold more than one non-FIFA nationality.

No.	Pos.	Nation	Player
2	DF	ARU	Reinhard Breinburg (to BVV Barendrecht)
4	DF	NED	Nick Kuijpers (to IJsselmeervogels)
5	DF	NED	Etienne Shew-Atjon (Retired)
7	MF	NED	Marcel van der Sloot (to RBC, was on loan from De Graafschap)
8	MF	BEL	Sven Delanoy (to (Belgium) KV Turnhout)
11	FW	NED	Género Zeefuik (loan return to PSV Eindhoven)
18	FW	NED	Melvin Zaalman (loan return to Jong Sparta Rotterdam)
—	GK	NED	Jordy van der Corput (to ASWH)
—	DF	NED	Iderlindo Moreno Freire (released)
—	MF	NED	Brian Pinas (to RVVH)
—	FW	NED	Eddy Putter (to FC Lienden)
—	FW	NED	Ibad Muhamadu (released)
—	FW	NED	Roel de Graaff (to RBC Roosendaal)
—	DF	NED	Marvin Westerduin (to VV Baronie)

=== FC Eindhoven ===
In: Note: Flags indicate national team as defined under FIFA eligibility rules; some limited exceptions apply. Players may hold more than one non-FIFA nationality.

No.	Pos.	Nation	Player
16	FW	NED	Jelle van Kruijssen (from Jong Willem II)
18	FW	BEL	Ratko Vansimpsen (from Willem II)
19	DF	NED	Sjors Paridaans (on loan from FC Emmen)
20	DF	NED	Rob van der Sluijs (free agent)
22	GK	NED	Laurens van Leuken (from Jong Helmond Sport)

Out: Note: Flags indicate national team as defined under FIFA eligibility rules; some limited exceptions apply. Players may hold more than one non-FIFA nationality.

No.	Pos.	Nation	Player
4	FW	BEL	Prince Asubonteng (released)
5	DF	FRA	Remy Amieux (to NEC Nijmegen)
9	FW	NED	Tim Nelemans (to (Belgium) Dessel Sport)
12	GK	SVK	Maros Ferenc (released)
13	DF	NED	Robin Faber (to (Iceland) Víkingur)
14	FW	BEL	Bart van den Eede (loan return to (Belgium) FCV Dender)
—	DF	NED	Koen Bots (released)
—	FW	NED	Selmo Kurbegovic (on loan to Telstar)
—	FW	NED	Jelle Schijvenaars (to EVV)
—	FW	ANG	Jean Black (to FC Oss)

=== FC Emmen ===
In: Note: Flags indicate national team as defined under FIFA eligibility rules; some limited exceptions apply. Players may hold more than one non-FIFA nationality.

No.	Pos.	Nation	Player
—	GK	NED	Harm Zeinstra (on loan from Jong Heerenveen, was already on loan)
—	GK	NED	Jurjan Wouda (on loan from Jong Heerenveen)
—	DF	NED	Richard Stolte (on loan from SC Heerenveen, was already on loan)
—	DF	NED	Johnny de Vries (on loan from SC Heerenveen, was already on loan)
—	DF	NED	Bart de Groot (on loan from SC Heerenveen, was already on loan)
—	MF	NED	Tjaronn Chery (on loan from FC Twente, was on loan to RBC)
—	MF	NED	Kay Velda (from Jong PSV)
—	MF	NED	Pele van Anholt (on loan from Jong Heerenveen)
—	FW	NED	Michel Poldervaart (from SC Heerenveen, was already on loan)
—	FW	NED	Ruud ter Heide (from SC Cambuur, was already on loan)
—	FW	ANT	Eldridge Rojer (from FC Zwolle)
—	FW	NED	Jeffrey de Visscher (from SC Cambuur)

Out: Note: Flags indicate national team as defined under FIFA eligibility rules; some limited exceptions apply. Players may hold more than one non-FIFA nationality.

No.	Pos.	Nation	Player
2	DF	NED	Timothy Cathalina (to (England) Tranmere Rovers)
3	DF	NED	Arjen Bergsma (loan return to Jong Heerenveen)
5	DF	NED	Sjors Paridaans (on loan to FC Eindhoven)
6	MF	NED	Niek Ripson (to RBC Roosendaal)
10	FW	NED	Roy Stroeve (to HHC Hardenberg)
11	FW	NED	Xander Houtkoop (loan return to Jong Heerenveen)
14	MF	NED	Tim Siekman (to HHC Hardenberg)
15	FW	NED	Wesley Wakker (to HHC Hardenberg)
18	FW	HUN	Tamás German (loan return to (Hungary) Lombard Pápa)
20	MF	ANT	Anton Jongsma (to WKE)
21	DF	BRA	Lázaro (loan return to SC Heerenveen)
22	GK	NED	Bas van Wegen (released)
25	MF	NED	Patrick Lip (to sv Genemuiden)
27	DF	BFA	Rahim Ouedraogo (released)
28	MF	NED	Erwin Buurmeijer (loan return to BV Veendam)
—	DF	NED	Frank Schijff (to HHC Hardenberg)
—	DF	NED	Jannes Wolters (retired)
—	DF	BEL	Joos Valgaeren (retired)
—	DF	MAR	Hassan Bai Kamara (loan return to SC Heerenveen)
—	MF	NED	Rico Wolven (loan return to SC Heerenveen)

=== Fortuna Sittard ===
In: Note: Flags indicate national team as defined under FIFA eligibility rules; some limited exceptions apply. Players may hold more than one non-FIFA nationality.

No.	Pos.	Nation	Player
—	DF	FRA	Philippe Liard (from (Belgium) KV Oostende)
—	MF	NED	Bernard Hofstede (from FC Volendam)
—	FW	BEL	Fabio Caracciolo (from ADO Den Haag, was on loan to FC Den Bosch)
—	MF	BRA	Diogo Sousa (on loan from (Brazil) Botafogo)
—	FW	NED	Soufiane Dadda (on loan from VVV-Venlo)
—	FW	BRA	João (on loan from (Brazil) Botafogo)

Out: Note: Flags indicate national team as defined under FIFA eligibility rules; some limited exceptions apply. Players may hold more than one non-FIFA nationality.

No.	Pos.	Nation	Player
—	GK	NED	Tom Grootaers (released)
—	DF	GER	Nico Vanek (released)
—	DF	BEL	Abdul Öcal (released)
—	DF	BEL	Pieter Nys (loan return to (Belgium) RC Genk)
—	DF	BEL	Sven Verdonck (loan return to (Belgium) RC Genk)
—	MF	NED	Edwin Linssen (loan return to Roda JC)
—	MF	BIH	Dino Peljto (to FC Oss)
—	MF	NED	Angelo Simone (to FC Oss)
—	MF	NED	Charlie van den Ouweland (released)
—	MF	GER	Marcus Rychlik (released)
—	FW	NED	Harrie Gommans (loan return to Roda JC)
—	FW	CMR	Marc Mboua (loan return to SC Cambuur)
—	FW	SWE	Demba Traoré (released)

=== Go Ahead Eagles ===
In: Note: Flags indicate national team as defined under FIFA eligibility rules; some limited exceptions apply. Players may hold more than one non-FIFA nationality.

No.	Pos.	Nation	Player
—	DF	NED	Wout Droste (from FC Twente, was already on loan)
—	FW	NED	Patrick Gerritsen (on loan from FC Twente, was already on loan)
—	GK	NED	Sergio Padt (on loan from Jong Ajax)
—	GK	NED	Rick Hofkamp (from DIO Groningen)
—	DF	NED	Freek Heerkens (from Jong PSV)
—	DF	NED	Sven Spekkink (from Jong De Graafschap)
—	MF	POL	Michal Janota (from Jong Feyenoord)
—	MF	NED	Joep van den Ouweland (from De Graafschap)
—	FW	NED	Jhon van Beukering (from NEC, was on loan to De Graafschap)
—	FW	NED	Gersom Klok (from BV Veendam)
—	FW	NED	Luís Pedro (from Feyenoord, was on loan to Excelsior)
—	FW	NED	Frank van der Zwan (from Jong FC Utrecht)
—	FW	GER	Theo Vogelsang (on loan from Jong FC Twente)

Out: Note: Flags indicate national team as defined under FIFA eligibility rules; some limited exceptions apply. Players may hold more than one non-FIFA nationality.

No.	Pos.	Nation	Player
6	MF	NED	Maikel Kieftenbeld (to FC Groningen)
7	FW	NED	Jules Reimerink (loan return to FC Twente)
10	FW	FIN	Kari Arkivuo (to (Sweden) BK Häcken)
11	FW	TUR	Halil Çolak (to (Turkey) Kasimpasa SK)
13	FW	EST	Sander Post (loan return to (Estonia) Flora Tallinn)
14	MF	NED	Jordy Zuidam (on loan to RBC Roosendaal)
15	DF	NED	Robbert Maruanaya (released)
18	FW	NED	Nigel Hasselbaink (to (Scotland) Hamilton, was on loan from PSV)
22	GK	NED	Remko Pasveer (loan return to Heracles Almelo)
—	GK	NED	Renze Fij (to Jong FC Groningen, was on loan from Jong FC Twente)
—	MF	NED	Ceriel Oosthout (to IJsselmeervogels)
—	FW	NED	Donny de Groot (to RKC Waalwijk)

=== Helmond Sport ===
In: Note: Flags indicate national team as defined under FIFA eligibility rules; some limited exceptions apply. Players may hold more than one non-FIFA nationality.

No.	Pos.	Nation	Player
4	DF	GER	Philipp Haastrup (from MVV)
17	DF	NED	Jop van der Linden (from Vitesse Arnhem, was on loan to AGOVV)
19	DF	CZE	Vojtěch Machek (from Feyenoord, was on loan to Excelsior)
21	MF	BEL	Robbie Haemhouts (from Almere City FC)
23	DF	NED	Deniz Aslan (from Jong Ajax)

Out: Note: Flags indicate national team as defined under FIFA eligibility rules; some limited exceptions apply. Players may hold more than one non-FIFA nationality.

No.	Pos.	Nation	Player
3	DF	NED	René Paardekooper (to VV Gemert)
5	DF	NED	Jeroen Veldmate (loan return to FC Groningen)
11	FW	MAR	Youssef Chida (to Dijkse Boys)
14	DF	BEL	Mike Mampuya (to (Cyprus) Doxa Katokopias)
15	FW	NED	Rick Verbeek (loan return to VVV-Venlo)
16	FW	NED	Vincent Weijl (loan return to (England) Liverpool)
19	DF	NED	Ruud Jansen (to RKSV Nuenen)
23	MF	NED	Mart Van de Gevel (to RKSV Nuenen)
24	MF	NED	Coen Jansen (to RKSV Nuenen)
27	FW	NED	Patrick Philippart (to RKSV Nuenen)
—	DF	NED	Rob van der Sluijs (released)
—	MF	NED	Len Koeman (released)

=== MVV ===
In: Note: Flags indicate national team as defined under FIFA eligibility rules; some limited exceptions apply. Players may hold more than one non-FIFA nationality.

No.	Pos.	Nation	Player
4	DF	NED	Sjors Verdellen (from VVV-Venlo)

Out: Note: Flags indicate national team as defined under FIFA eligibility rules; some limited exceptions apply. Players may hold more than one non-FIFA nationality.

No.	Pos.	Nation	Player
1	GK	TUR	Volkan Ünlü (to (Turkey) Trabzonspor)
2	DF	BEL	Alexandre Bryssinck (to (Belgium) White Star)
3	DF	DEN	Ole Tobiasen (to EHC)
4	DF	GER	Philipp Haastrup (to Helmond Sport)
7	MF	NED	Bryan Linssen (to VVV-Venlo)
9	FW	SWE	Emra Tahirović (loan return to (Switzerland) FC Zürich)
10	FW	FRA	Daniel Gomez (to (Cyprus) Doxa Katokopias)
11	MF	GAM	Ebrima Ebou Sillah (released)
12	GK	BEL	Simon Wagner (to (Belgium) RFC Lüttich)
13	FW	TUR	Güven Cavus (released)
21	DF	NED	Jorrit Ritzen (to EVV)
23	MF	BDI	Faty Papy (loan return to (Turkey) Trabzonspor)
--	GK	BEL	Ruud Boffin (to (England) West Ham United, was on loan to VVV)
—	MF	MAR	Ibrahim Maaroufi (to (Morocco) Wydad Casablanca)
—	MF	BEL	Christian Brüls (to (Belgium) KVC Westerlo)
—	FW	DEN	Sandro Spasojevic (to (Denmark) FC Fyn)
—	MF	BEL	Kerem Zevne (to (Belgium) Antwerp FC)

=== RBC Roosendaal ===
In: Note: Flags indicate national team as defined under FIFA eligibility rules; some limited exceptions apply. Players may hold more than one non-FIFA nationality.

No.	Pos.	Nation	Player
4	DF	BEL	Yannick Lodders (from (Belgium) Anderlecht)
5	MF	NED	Joey Brock (from NEC)
8	MF	BEL	Ken van Mierlo (from FC Utrecht)
10	MF	NED	Marcel van der Sloot (from De Graafschap, was on loan to Dordrecht)
11	MF	NED	Roel de Graaff (from FC Dordrecht)
12	MF	NED	Jordy Zuidam (on loan from Go Ahead Eagles)
15	DF	NED	Jahmill Flu (from FC Utrecht)
16	MF	NED	Niek Ripson (from FC Emmen)
20	DF	NED	Bram Langedijk (from Jong NEC)
24	MF	NED	Charlie van den Ouweland (from Fortuna Sittard)

Out: Note: Flags indicate national team as defined under FIFA eligibility rules; some limited exceptions apply. Players may hold more than one non-FIFA nationality.

No.	Pos.	Nation	Player
5	DF	NED	Sjaak Polak (loan return to BV Veendam)
7	FW	NED	Lesley Nahrwold (loan return to FC Twente)
9	FW	NED	Sjoerd Ars (to FC Zwolle)
11	FW	NED	Tim Peters (to IJsselmeervogels, was on loan to FC Oss)
12	GK	NED	Gino Mommers (to NAC Breda)
15	FW	NED	Patrick Duarte (to Quick Boys)
16	MF	NED	Marc Corman (to V.V. D.E.S.K.)
17	MF	NED	John Schot (to Hoek)
18	MF	BEL	Jordan Remacle (to (Belgium) OH Leuven)
20	MF	NED	Joran Pot (to FC Zwolle)
22	DF	NED	Carlos Ramos (released)
24	MF	BEL	Nicky Hayen (to (Belgium) OH Leuven)
25	MF	NED	Jurgen Gijzen (to VV Baronie)
28	MF	NED	Thomas van den Houten (to R.O.C. de Charleroi-Marchienne)
29	MF	NED	Tjaronn Chery (loan return to FC Twente)
30	MF	BEL	Umut Gündoğan (to FC Brussels)

=== RKC Waalwijk ===
In: Note: Flags indicate national team as defined under FIFA eligibility rules; some limited exceptions apply. Players may hold more than one non-FIFA nationality.

No.	Pos.	Nation	Player
3	DF	NED	Ard van Peppen (from Excelsior)
5	DF	NED	Henrico Drost (from SC Heerenveen, was on loan to VVV-Venlo)
7	FW	NED	Mitchell Schet (from Feyenoord)
8	MF	NED	Aaron Meijers (from FC Volendam)
9	FW	NED	Fred Benson (loan return from (China) Shandong Luneng)
10	FW	NED	Robert Braber (from (Germany) FC Ingolstadt 04)
12	DF	NED	Sigourney Bandjar (from Excelsior)
15	FW	NED	Paddy John (from Heracles)
17	MF	NED	Sander Duits (from Almere City FC)
20	FW	NED	Donny de Groot (from Go Ahead Eagles)
22	GK	NED	Arjan van Dijk (from Excelsior)

Out: Note: Flags indicate national team as defined under FIFA eligibility rules; some limited exceptions apply. Players may hold more than one non-FIFA nationality.

No.	Pos.	Nation	Player
1	GK	NED	Jurgen Wevers (to FC Oss)
2	DF	ANT	Dustley Mulder (to (Bulgaria) Levski Sofia)
3	DF	NED	Wouter Gudde (to Excelsior)
5	DF	NED	Gijs Luirink (loan return to AZ)
7	FW	BEL	Benjamin De Ceulaer (to (Belgium) KSC Lokeren)
8	MF	GHA	Anthony Obodai (to (United States) Houston Dynamo)
9	FW	NED	Charlison Benschop (to AZ)
10	MF	NED	Ruud Berger (retired)
17	FW	NED	Kevin Vink (to Excelsior Maassluis)
19	FW	NED	Fouad Idabdelhay (loan return to NAC Breda)
20	MF	BEL	Alexandre Di Gregorio (to (Belgium) Antwerp)
21	MF	BEL	Gérard Lifondja (released)
24	DF	ANT	Hubertson Pauletta (released)
25	FW	NED	Eddy Vorm (to (Germany) FC Magdeburg)
28	MF	NED	Kemy Agustien (loan return to AZ)
32	MF	NED	Shkodran Metaj (loan return to FC Groningen)

=== Sparta Rotterdam ===
In: Note: Flags indicate national team as defined under FIFA eligibility rules; some limited exceptions apply. Players may hold more than one non-FIFA nationality.

No.	Pos.	Nation	Player
—	GK	NED	André Krul (on loan from FC Utrecht)
—	DF	NED	Ruud Kras (on loan from FC Zwolle)
—	DF	NED	Mohamed Madmar (from Jong AZ)
—	DF	AUS	James Downey (from (Australia) North Queensland Fury)
—	MF	NED	René van Dieren (from AGOVV)
—	MF	NZL	Cory Chettleburgh (from (New Zealand) YoungHeart Manawatu)
—	FW	NED	Iwan Redan (free agent)

Out: Note: Flags indicate national team as defined under FIFA eligibility rules; some limited exceptions apply. Players may hold more than one non-FIFA nationality.

No.	Pos.	Nation	Player
3	DF	NGR	Ayodele Adeleye (to (Ukraine) FC Metalurh Donetsk)
4	MF	NED	Sander van Gessel (to (Canada) FC Edmonton)
6	MF	NED	Edwin van Bueren (to RKSV Leonidas)
8	MF	NED	Arne Slot (to FC Zwolle, was already on loan)
9	FW	NED	Rydell Poepon (to De Graafschap)
10	FW	CRO	Darko Bodul (loan return to AFC Ajax)
11	MF	NED	Charles Dissels (to FC Volendam)
14	FW	NED	Romano Denneboom (released, was on loan from FC Twente)
17	FW	FRA	Edouard Duplan (to FC Utrecht)
19	DF	NED	Milano Koenders (loan return to AZ)
20	MF	NED	Erik Falkenburg (to AZ)
21	GK	NED	Cor Varkevisser (to Telstar)
22	DF	NED	Nick Viergever (to AZ)
37	FW	NED	Mehmet Aldogan (released)
--	FW	NED	Yuri Rose (to De Graafschap, was already on loan)
--	GK	NED	Eric Abdul (released)
--	DF	NED	Jamie Jaliens (released)
--	MF	NED	Jeroen Merk (released)
--	MF	NED	Michael Nolet (released)

=== Telstar ===
In: Note: Flags indicate national team as defined under FIFA eligibility rules; some limited exceptions apply. Players may hold more than one non-FIFA nationality.

No.	Pos.	Nation	Player
1	GK	NED	Cor Varkevisser (from Sparta Rotterdam)
5	DF	NED	Jeroen Tesselaar (on loan from AZ Alkmaar II, was already on loan)
6	MF	NED	Ilias Haddad (on loan from AZ Alkmaar II, was already on loan)
7	FW	NED	Furdjel Narsingh (on loan from AZ Alkmaar II, was already on loan)
9	MF	NED	Kevin Brands (on loan from AZ Alkmaar II, was already on loan)
11	FW	NED	Edwin Gyasi (on loan from AZ Alkmaar II)
12	FW	NED	Johan Plat (from FC Oss)
13	DF	NED	Mike Boelee (on loan from AZ Alkmaar II)
14	MF	NED	Wouter de Vogel (on loan from AZ Alkmaar II)
15	DF	EST	Marek Kaljumäe (on loan from AZ Alkmaar II)
18	DF	NED	Milan Hoek (on loan from AZ Alkmaar II)
19	FW	NED	Selmo Kurbegovic (on loan from FC Eindhoven)
20	FW	SWE	Zlatan Krizanovic (on loan from AZ Alkmaar II)
21	DF	NED	Toine van Huizen (on loan from AZ Alkmaar II)
27	FW	NED	Sergio Parris (from AFC)
30	FW	NED	Melvin Holwijn (from (Germany) FC Carl Zeiss Jena)

Out: Note: Flags indicate national team as defined under FIFA eligibility rules; some limited exceptions apply. Players may hold more than one non-FIFA nationality.

No.	Pos.	Nation	Player
1	GK	NED	Harmen Kuperus (released)
9	FW	NED	Glynor Plet (to Heracles)
11	FW	NED	Erwin Koen (to De Treffers)
14	DF	NED	Koen Stam (to FC Volendam)
15	MF	NED	Gaston Salasiwa (released, was on loan from AZ Alkmaar II)
17	FW	NED	Donny Day (released)
18	DF	NED	Robert Schutz (released)
19	GK	NED	Jordy Deckers (released, was on loan from AZ Alkmaar)
24	FW	NED	Levi Marengo (released)
25	DF	NED	Mettin Copier (released, was on loan from AZ Alkmaar II)
—	MF	SUR	Nicandro Breeveld (to (Romania) Astra Ploiești)

=== BV Veendam ===
In: Note: Flags indicate national team as defined under FIFA eligibility rules; some limited exceptions apply. Players may hold more than one non-FIFA nationality.

No.	Pos.	Nation	Player
12	MF	PHI	Jason de Jong (from (Belgium) K.V. Turnhout)
16	MF	CAN	Andrew Ornoch (from Heracles Almelo)
17	DF	CZE	Pavel Čmovš (on loan from NEC)
18	DF	NED	Michael Jansen (on loan from FC Groningen)
20	MF	CZE	Vašek Svoboda (from Jong Feyenoord)
24	MF	NED	Qays Shayesteh (from Heracles Almelo)
26	GK	IRI	Agil Etemadi (from SC Heerenveen)
33	GK	NED	Ben Meedendorp (from Jong FC Groningen)

Out: Note: Flags indicate national team as defined under FIFA eligibility rules; some limited exceptions apply. Players may hold more than one non-FIFA nationality.

No.	Pos.	Nation	Player
4	DF	NED	Gerard Wiekens (retired)
6	MF	NED	Paul Matthijs (to (Canada) FC Edmonton)
7	FW	NED	Gersom Klok (to Go Ahead Eagles)
9	FW	NED	Michiel Hemmen (to AGOVV)
11	FW	NED	Tjeerd Korf (to Flevo Boys)
14	FW	NED	Joël Bijlow (released)
16	GK	NED	Remco van der Veen (released)
17	GK	NED	Jeroen Lambers (to WKE)
20	MF	NED	Erwin Buurmeijer (to WKE, was on loan to FC Emmen)
25	MF	NED	Luciano Dompig (to Almere City FC)
31	FW	NED	Roy Van Dalen (to ACV)
33	GK	NED	Leon ter Wielen (to FC Zwolle)
--	DF	NED	Sjaak Polak (to SVV Scheveningen, was on loan to RBC Roosendaal)

=== FC Volendam ===
In: Note: Flags indicate national team as defined under FIFA eligibility rules; some limited exceptions apply. Players may hold more than one non-FIFA nationality.

No.	Pos.	Nation	Player
4	DF	NED	Barry Opdam (from (Austria) Salzburg)
8	MF	HUN	László Zsidai (on loan from (Hungary) MTK Budapest)
14	FW	NED	Kees Tol (from RKAV Volendam)
23	MF	NED	Charles Dissels (from Sparta)
27	DF	NED	Koen Stam (from Telstar)
28	MF	NED	Olaf Lindenbergh (from AGOVV)

Out: Note: Flags indicate national team as defined under FIFA eligibility rules; some limited exceptions apply. Players may hold more than one non-FIFA nationality.

No.	Pos.	Nation	Player
—	GK	NED	Marco van Duin (to NEC Nijmegen)
—	DF	NED	Kelvin Maynard (to (Portugal) S.C Olhanense)
—	DF	NED	Aaron Meijers (to RKC Waalwijk)
—	DF	NED	Tim Bakens (to (Switzerland) FC St. Gallen)
—	DF	NED	Wouter Artz (to (Belgium) FCV Dender)
—	MF	NED	Bernard Hofstede (to Fortuna Sittard)
—	MF	NED	Mathieu Boots (to HVV Hollandia)
—	MF	NED	Yannick de Wit (released)
—	FW	NED	Rowin van Zaanen (to Willem II)

=== FC Zwolle ===
In: Note: Flags indicate national team as defined under FIFA eligibility rules; some limited exceptions apply. Players may hold more than one non-FIFA nationality.

No.	Pos.	Nation	Player
—	GK	NED	Leon ter Wielen (from BV Veendam)
—	DF	NED	Joey van den Berg (from Alcides)
—	MF	NED	Arne Slot (from Sparta Rotterdam, was already on loan)
—	MF	NED	Joran Pot (from RBC Roosendaal)
—	MF	NED	Gilian Justiana (from Jong FC Zwolle)
—	MF	NED	Frank Olijve (from FC Groningen)
—	MF	NED	Yanic Wildschut (from Jong Ajax)
—	MF	NED	Jesper Drost (from Jong FC Zwolle)
—	FW	NED	Sjoerd Ars (from RBC Roosendaal)
—	FW	NED	Pepijn Kluin (from Jong FC Groningen)

Out: Note: Flags indicate national team as defined under FIFA eligibility rules; some limited exceptions apply. Players may hold more than one non-FIFA nationality.

No.	Pos.	Nation	Player
2	DF	NED	Dennis van der Wal (released)
4	DF	SVK	Zdenko Kaprálik (to Cambuur)
9	FW	CPV	Cecilio Lopes (to FC Dordrecht, was on loan from SC Heerenveen)
11	FW	ANT	Eldridge Rojer (to FC Emmen)
14	FW	NED	Jeffrey van den Berg (released)
15	DF	ARG	Martin Guarino (released)
16	GK	NED	René Oosterhof (to SC Heerenveen)
19	MF	NED	Thomas Vossebelt (to Willem II)
20	DF	NED	Erik Wisse (to ASWH)
30	GK	NED	Dolf Kerklaan (to ASWH)
—	MF	NED	Cees Keizer (to FC Oss)
—	FW	HUN	Gergő Beliczky (to (Hungary) Vasas)

== See also ==
- Football in the Netherlands
- Transfer window
