= Hofstede (surname) =

Hofstede is a Dutch toponymic surname. A hofstede is a farmhouse with its lands (i.e. a farm). Variant forms are Hofsté, Hofstee and Hofsteede. Notable people with the surname include:

- Albert Hofstede (1940–2016), American politician
- Arthur ter Hofstede (born 1966), Dutch computer scientist
- Bernard Hofstede (born 1980), Dutch football midfielder
- Bregje Hofstede (born 1988), Netherlands journalist
- Cornelis Hofstede de Groot (1863–1930), Dutch art collector, art historian and museum curator
- Geert Hofstede (1928–2020), Dutch organisational psychologist and anthropologist
- Henk Hofstede (born 1951), Dutch pop rock singer and lyricist
- Lennard Hofstede (born 1994), Dutch racing cyclist
- Peter Hofstede (born 1967), Dutch football striker
- Peter Hofstee (born 1962), Dutch physicist and computer scientist
- Petrus Hofstede de Groot (1802–1886), Dutch theologian
- Tim Hofstede (born 1989), Dutch football defender
