= Rene Osei Kofi =

Ghanaian-Dutch footballer

René Osei Kofi
Personal information
- Full name: René Osei Kofi
- Date of birth: 31 December 1991 (age 34)
- Place of birth: Amsterdam, Netherlands
- Height: 1.78 m (5 ft 10 in)
- Position: Defender

Youth career
- Zeeburgia
- 2007–2010: Ajax

Senior career*
Years	Team	Apps	(Gls)
2010	Ajax	0	(0)
2010	→ Almere City (loan)	8	(0)
2011–2012	Comarca de Níjar		
2012–2013	Haaglandia	15	(2)
2013	FK Drita	1	(0)
2013	Aris Limassol	7	(0)
2017	Chorley	0	(0)
2019	TEC	4	(0)
2022	DJK TuS Hordel	13	(9)
2022	Bamber Bridge	0	(0)
- * Club domestic league appearances and goals as of 08:14, 21 September 2020 (UTC)

Rene Osei Kofi (born 31 December 1991) is a Dutch footballer who plays as a defender. He has played for various clubs in the Netherlands, England, Spain, Cyprus and North Macedonia.

== Career ==
As a product of the Ajax Youth Academy, he began his professional career at Almere City in the Dutch Eerste Divisie on a season-long loan for the 2010–2011 season.

On 10 November 2010, his loan spell was brought to an abrupt end following an incident in the Almere City locker room, where Osei Kofi put a gun to the head of teammate Christian Gandu. Two days later his contract with Ajax was canceled with immediate effect as a result.

Osei Kofi then went on trial in England at Birmingham City and Crystal Palace but was not offered a contract. In March 2012 he signed with the Spanish club CD Comarca de Níjar which plays in the Tercera División. In the 2012/13 season he played for Haaglandia in the Topklasse. He finished the season with FK Drita Bogovinje in North Macedonia. In June 2013 he signed for a season with Aris Limassol in Cyprus. Then he was without a club for several years.

In October 2017 he signed for English non-league side Chorley, however was released after making just a single appearance in the FA Cup.

From the 2019/20 season onward, he played for SV TEC in the Tweede Divisie.

In February 2022, Osei Kofi was playing Germany for Westfalenliga side DJK TuS Hordel. In September 2022, he appeared in an FA Cup for Northern Premier League side Bamber Bridge.
