= Jules Reimerink =

Dutch footballer (born 1989)

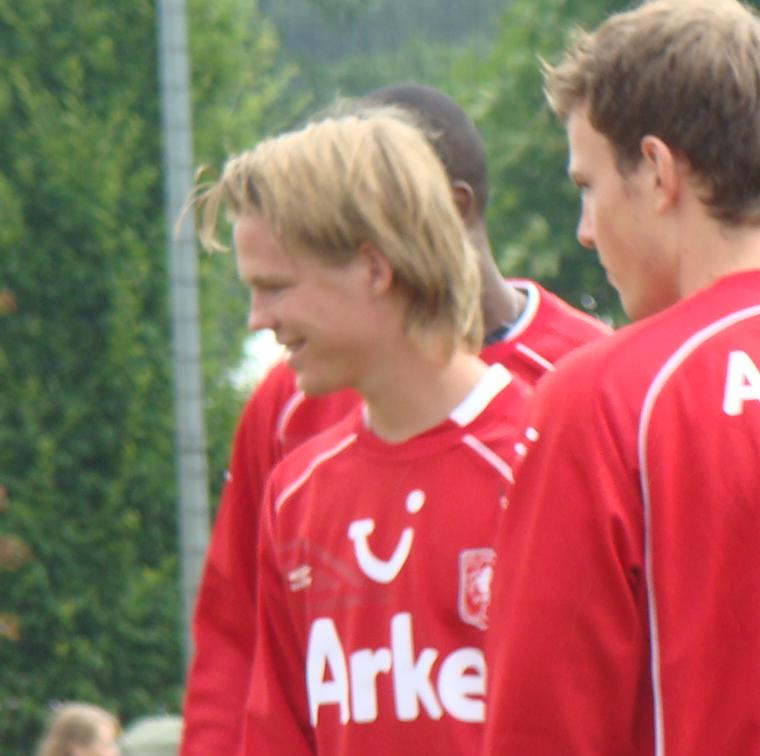
- Reimerink with Twente in 2009

Personal information
- Date of birth: 30 September 1989 (age 37)
- Place of birth: Oldenzaal, Netherlands
- Height: 1.85 m (6 ft 1 in)
- Position: Left winger

Youth career
- –2001: Quick '20
- 2001–2008: Twente

Senior career*
Years	Team	Apps	(Gls)
2008–2010	Twente	0	(0)
2009–2010	→ Go Ahead Eagles (loan)	38	(7)
2010–2012	Energie Cottbus	49	(2)
2012–2014	VVV-Venlo	37	(7)
2014–2015	Go Ahead Eagles	28	(2)
2015–2016	Viktoria Köln	36	(8)
2016–2018	VfL Osnabrück	63	(10)
2018–2020	Sportfreunde Lotte	38	(3)
2020–2021	Quick '20		
2021–2025	TuS Bersenbrück	101	(34)

International career
2007–2009	Netherlands U19	10	(2)

Managerial career
- 2026: TuS Bersenbrück (interim)
- * Club domestic league appearances and goals

Jules Reimerink (born 30 September 1989) is a Dutch former professional footballer. He was a two-footed player who played as a winger, but could also play as a striker.

== Club career ==
=== Twente ===
Born in Oldenzaal, Overijssel, Reimerink began his youth career at hometown team, the amateurs of Quick '20. Because of his great displays for the youth team, he was picked up by top-tier side FC Twente. Between 2001 and 2007, he played for the youth team, joining the reserves in summer 2007. He became top goalscorer of Twente's reserves and also won the cup with the second squad. He was rewarded with a new four-year contract, which he signed, keeping him in Enschede until 2011. It was also announced that he would join Go Ahead Eagles on loan for the next one-and-a-half season.

==== Go Ahead Eagles (loan) ====
On 18 January 2009, Reimerink made his Eerste Divisie debut for the Eagles. He was positioned as right striker in the starting lineup. Go Ahead Eagles, however, were defeated 0–1 by Zwolle through a goal scored by Derk Boerrigter. After having played six matches – five matches in the starting lineup, one as a substitute – he suffered a fracture in his left ankle. This meant that Reimerink was ruled out for four to six weeks In the 2009–10 season, Reimerink stayed on loan at Go Ahead Eagles. This resulted in a strong season for Reimerink, scoring four goals and being chosen as one of the top talents of the Eerste Divisie.

=== Energie Cottbus ===
In 2010, he signed a four-year contract with German club FC Energie Cottbus. In his first year under head coach Claus-Dieter Wollitz, he performed well. After making less appearances in the 2011–12 season under Wollitz's successor Rudi Bommer, his contract, which was still running for two years, was terminated.

=== Return to the Netherlands ===
On 12 July 2012, Reimerink signed a three-year deal with VVV-Venlo. On 19 June 2014, Reimerink signed a one-year deal with his former team Go Ahead Eagles, achieving promotion to the Dutch Eredivisie in his first season there.

=== Return to Germany ===
Although Reimerink had also received offers from more prominent clubs, he moved – also for private reasons – to the fourth-tier Regionalliga West club FC Viktoria Köln ahead of the 2015–16 season. After the season he left the club.

Reimerink had expressed a wish to play in the 3. Liga, and in June 2016, VfL Osnabrück signed him. He received a two-year contract. After two seasons of playing regularly, Reimerink moved to Sportfreunde Lotte on a free transfer, signing a two-year contract on 22 June 2018.

=== Later career ===
After having played in Germany for some years, Reimerink returned to his first youth club Quick '20 from the 2020–21 season, competing in the Derde Divisie.

On 21 March 2021, Reimerink signed with Oberliga Niedersachsen club TuS Bersenbrück. He retired as a player in summer 2025, and became interim manager of TuS Bersenbrück at the end of the 2025–26 season.
