= Cees Paauwe =

Dutch footballer

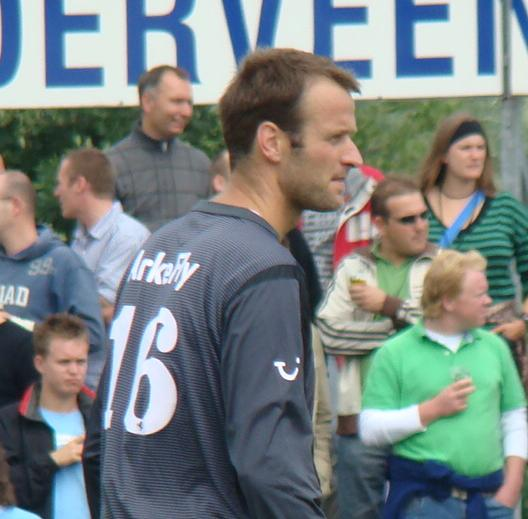
- Paauwe playing for Twente in 2008

Personal information
- Full name: Cees Paauwe
- Date of birth: 3 November 1977 (age 48)
- Place of birth: Dronten, Netherlands
- Height: 1.94 m (6 ft 4 in)
- Position: Goalkeeper

Youth career
- vv Lyra
- 't Harde
- Zwolle
- Twente

Senior career*
Years	Team	Apps	(Gls)
1995–2005	Twente	31	(0)
2000–2002	→ Cambuur (loan)	57	(0)
2005–2006	ADO Den Haag	6	(0)
2006–2010	Twente	2	(0)
2010–2011	Excelsior	24	(0)
2011	Quick '20	0	(0)
2011–2012	N.E.C.	0	(0)
Total		120	(0)
- * Club domestic league appearances and goals

Cees Paauwe (Dutch pronunciation: [keːs ˈpʌu.ə]; born 3 November 1977) is a Dutch former professional footballer who played as a goalkeeper.

== Career ==
Born in Dronten, Netherlands, Paauwe played for Lyra, SV 't Harde and FC Zwolle as a youth. From 1995 to 2000 he played for FC Twente where he made his debut in the Eredivisie in his first year. In the first five seasons with Twente he only played during two matches. In summer 2000 he moved to Eerste Divisie club SC Cambuur where he became first choice. Two years later he returned to FC Twente where he replaced Sander Boschker when the latter was transferred to Ajax Amsterdam. Until then, and also later, Paauwe never saw more than five appearances per Eredivisie season. After Boschker's return in the winter of the 2003–04 season, Paauwe became second choice again.

In 2005, he moved to ADO Den Haag but did not play much due to a knee injury he suffered later that year. His contract with ADO was not extended in 2006 and he returned to FC Twente. In the summer of 2010, he was transferred to SBV Excelsior.

In July 2011, he left the Eredivisie for Quick '20 in the Topklasse, the third tier of football in the Netherlands. But on 30 August 2011, around a month later, he returned to the Eredivisie, joining N.E.C. Nijmegen.

Cees Paauwe is the younger brother of former Feyenoord player Patrick Paauwe.

== Honors ==
Twente

- UEFA Intertoto Cup: 2006
- Dutch Champion: 2010
