= Robert Böhm =

German footballer

Personal information
- Date of birth: 28 March 1988 (age 38)
- Place of birth: Lubliniec, Poland
- Height: 1.85 m (6 ft 1 in)
- Position: Goalkeeper

Youth career
- FC St. Hubert
- 1. FC Viersen
- KFC Uerdingen 05
- Borussia Mönchengladbach
- Schalke 04
- SV Straelen

Senior career*
Years	Team	Apps	(Gls)
2008–2010	VVV-Venlo	3	(0)
2011	MVV	3	(0)
Total		6	(0)
- * Club domestic league appearances and goals

Robert Böhm (born 28 March 1988) is a German former professional footballer who played as a goalkeeper.

== Career ==
Böhm was born in Lubliniec, Poland. He went through his youth playing for various German sides, including the youth departments of KFC Uerdingen 05, Borussia Mönchengladbach and Schalke 04. He was signed by Dutch side VVV-Venlo in 2008, from Niederrheinliga side SV Straelen.

He was released by VVV in 2010, but signed by MVV in March 2011, following a lingering injury by first keeper, Cliff Mardulier.
