= Alexander Bannink =

Dutch footballer (born 1990)

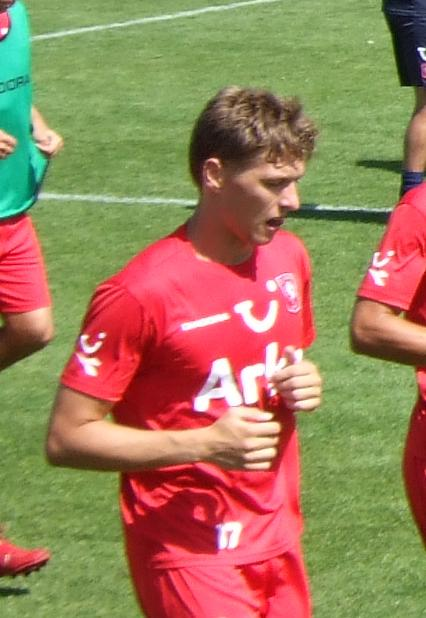
- Bannink in 2010

Personal information
- Date of birth: 20 February 1990 (age 36)
- Place of birth: Oldenzaal, Netherlands
- Height: 1.85 m (6 ft 1 in)
- Position: Midfielder

Youth career
- Quick '20

Senior career*
| Years | Team | Apps | (Gls) |
| 2009–2012 | Twente | 3 | (0) |
| 2010–2011 | → Heracles (loan) | 4 | (0) |
| 2011–2012 | → FC Zwolle (loan) | 18 | (3) |
| 2012–2015 | Emmen | 81 | (27) |
| 2015–2017 | De Graafschap | 29 | (3) |
| 2017 | → Emmen (loan) | 16 | (3) |
| 2017–2019 | Emmen | 60 | (14) |
| 2019–2020 | Go Ahead Eagles | 19 | (2) |
| 2020–2021 | HSC '21 | 5 | (1) |
| 2021–2023 | Gütersloh | 55 | (19) |
| 2023–2025 | TuS Bersenbrück | 17 | (5) |
| Total | | 307 | (77) |
- * Club domestic league appearances and goals

Alexander Bannink (born 20 February 1990) is a Dutch retired footballer who played as a midfielder.

== Career ==
Bannink formerly played for FC Twente, Heracles, FC Zwolle and FC Emmen.

He joined De Graafschap in summer 2015.

He joined Go Ahead Eagles after spending two years with FC Emmen.

== Honours ==
Twente

- Johan Cruijff Schaal: 2010
