= Wout Droste =

Dutch footballer (born 1989)

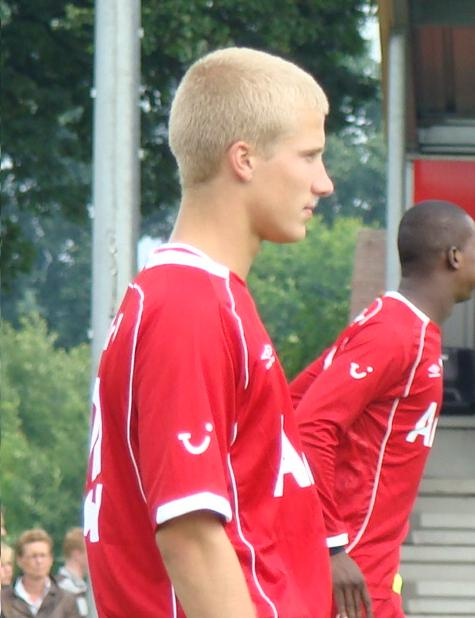
- Droste in 2008

Personal information
- Date of birth: 20 May 1989 (age 37)
- Place of birth: Oldenzaal, Netherlands
- Height: 1.80 m (5 ft 11 in)
- Position: Right back

Youth career
- Quick '20
- Twente

Senior career*
Years	Team	Apps	(Gls)
2008–2011	Go Ahead Eagles	75	(1)
2011–2015	Cambuur	114	(2)
2015–2019	Heracles	73	(0)
2019–2021	Go Ahead Eagles	27	(1)
2021–2022	ÍA	16	(0)
Total		305	(4)
- * Club domestic league appearances and goals

Wout Droste (born 20 May 1989) is a Dutch retired footballer who played as a right back.

== Club career ==
Droste formerly played for hometown amateur club Quick '20 and the FC Twente/Heracles academy. He signed senior terms with Go Ahead Eagles in 2008 and moved to SC Cambuur after three seasons. He joined Heracles in summer 2015. Droste quit football in 2022 after a season in Iceland due to physical issues.

== Honours ==
=== Club ===
Cambuur

- Eerste Divisie : 2012–13
