= Rémi Amieux =

French footballer (born 1986)

Rémy Amieux
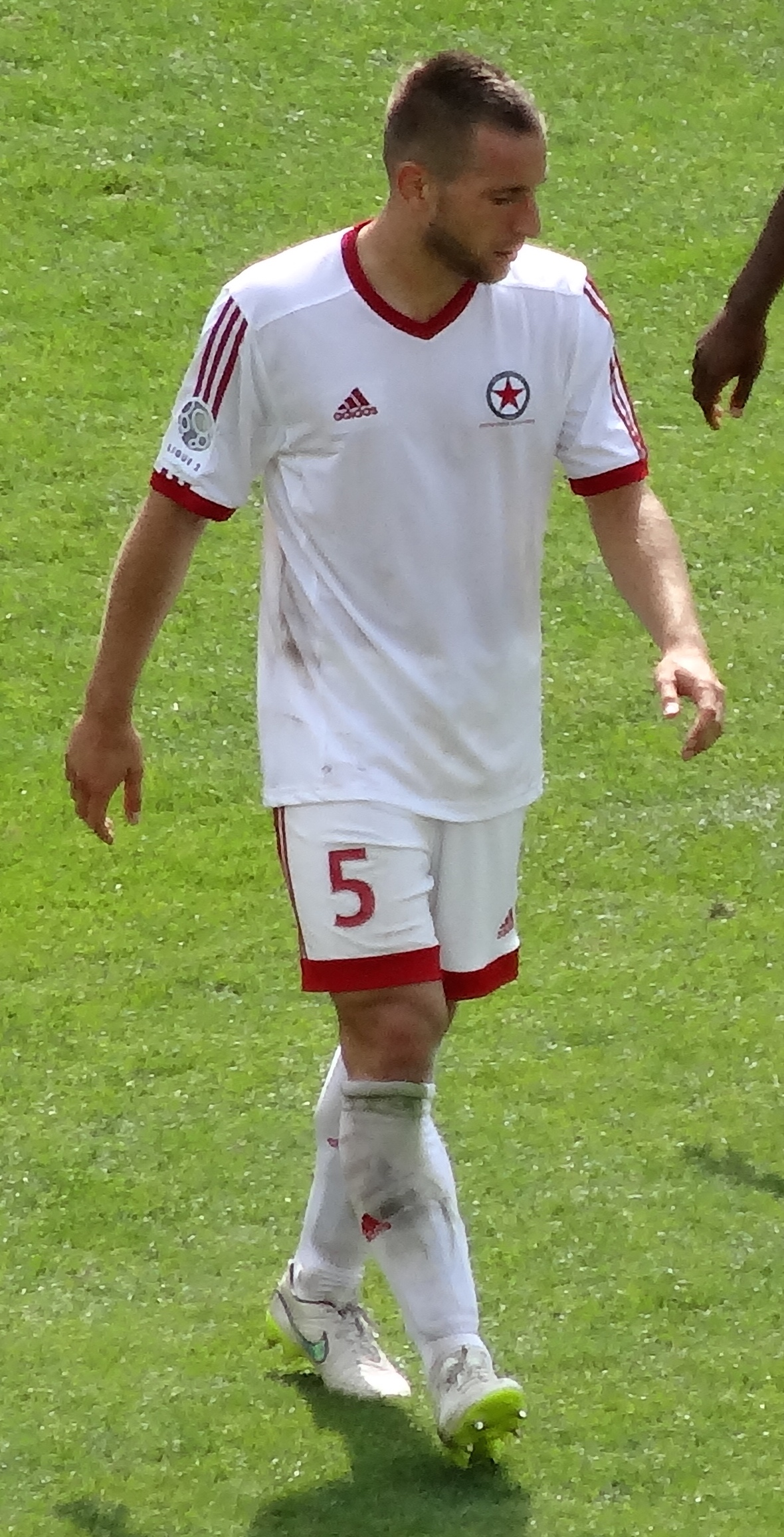
- Amieux in 2015

Personal information
- Full name: Rémy Amieux
- Date of birth: 5 September 1986 (age 40)
- Place of birth: Vienne, France
- Height: 1.73 m (5 ft 8 in)
- Position: Left-back

Senior career*
Years	Team	Apps	(Gls)
2003–2007	Lens B	50	(2)
2007–2008	Grenoble B	18	(0)
2008–2009	Bayonne	19	(2)
2009–2010	Eindhoven	27	(2)
2010–2013	NEC	58	(3)
2013–2014	RKC	34	(2)
2014–2015	NAC	21	(0)
2015–2017	Red Star	25	(0)
2017–2019	Andrézieux	41	(2)
2019–2022	Hauts Lyonnais	2	(0)
Total		295	(13)
- * Club domestic league appearances and goals as of 19:31, 16 November 2019 (UTC)

Rémy Amieux (born 5 September 1986) is a French former footballer who plays as a left-back. He formerly played for Dutch clubs NEC, FC Eindhoven, RKC Waalwijk and NAC Breda.
