= Roy Terschegget =

Dutch footballer (born 1987)

Personal information
- Date of birth: 8 January 1987 (age 39)
- Place of birth: Netherlands
- Position: Midfielder

Team information
- Current team: De Merino's

Senior career*
Years	Team	Apps	(Gls)
–2010	De Graafschap	6	(0)
2010–2019	GVVV	218	(40)
2019–2022	Spakenburg	36	(0)
2022–	De Merino's		
- * Club domestic league appearances and goals

Roy Terschegget (born 8 January 1987) is a Dutch footballer who plays as a midfielder for De Merino's.

== Early life ==
Terschegget was born in 1987 in the Netherlands. He is a native of Veenendaal, Netherlands.

== Career ==
Terschegget started his career with Dutch side De Graafschap. In 2010, he signed for Dutch side GVVV. He was regarded as one of the club's most important players. In 2019, he signed for Dutch side Spakenburg. He was described as "immediately managed to conquer a starting place" while playing for the club. In 2022, he signed for Dutch side De Merino's. He was described as "considered one of the best midfielders in amateur football for years".

== Style of play ==
Terschegget mainly operates as a midfielder. He has received comparisons to Italy international Andrea Pirlo.

== Personal life ==
Terschegget has a daughter. He has a brother.
