= Joost Ebergen =

Dutch footballer

Personal information
- Full name: Joost Ebergen
- Date of birth: 2 June 1990 (age 36)
- Place of birth: Lith, Netherlands
- Height: 1.88 m (6 ft 2 in)
- Position: Defender

Youth career
- SV Litta
- 2001–2009: TOP Oss

Senior career*
Years	Team	Apps	(Gls)
2009–2011	N.E.C.	0	(0)
2009–2010	→ FC Oss	24	(0)
2011–2012	FC Oss	1	(0)
- * Club domestic league appearances and goals as of 14:00, 2 July 2010 (UTC)

Joost Ebergen (born 2 June 1990) is a Dutch retired footballer who currently works as a player agent.

== Club career ==
Ebergen played in the TOP Oss youth system and signed professional terms with N.E.C. in 2009. He was immediately loaned to Eerste Divisie side FC Oss and joined them permanently the next season.

He quit professional football in 2012 to focus on a social career and after playing a few seasons in amateur football, he quit altogether in 2017 due to persisting injuries and to continue his job as a player agent.
