= Ali Benomar =

Dutch footballer (born 1988)

Personal information
- Full name: Ali Benomar
- Date of birth: 9 May 1988 (age 38)
- Place of birth: Rotterdam, Netherlands
- Position: Midfielder

Youth career
- 1997–2000: EDS
- 2000–2004: Spartaan'20
- 2004–2008: NAC

Senior career*
Years	Team	Apps	(Gls)
2008–2010	NAC	1	(0)
- * Club domestic league appearances and goals as of 16:07, 23 December 2009 (UTC)

Ali Benomar (born 9 May 1988) is Dutch retired footballer who played as a midfielder.

== Club career ==
Born in Rotterdam to Moroccan parents, Benomar played professionally for NAC Breda, making his debut against FC Twente in a February 2009 Eredivisie match.

He moved into amateur football to play for IFC Ambacht and joined Nieuwerkerk in summer 2012. He also played for Deltasport, Poortugaal and BVCB Bergschenhoek.
