= Rico Wolven =

Dutch footballer

Personal information
- Full name: Rico Wolven
- Date of birth: 25 March 1990 (age 36)
- Place of birth: Zwartsluis, Netherlands
- Height: 1.85 m (6 ft 1 in)
- Position: Centre back

Team information
- Current team: Spakenburg
- Number: 3

Youth career
- SC Heerenveen

Senior career*
Years	Team	Apps	(Gls)
2009–2011	SC Heerenveen	0	(0)
2009–2010	→ FC Emmen (loan)	0	(0)
2011–2012	SC Veendam	22	(0)
2012–2013	Go Ahead Eagles	5	(0)
2013–	Spakenburg	18	(1)
- * Club domestic league appearances and goals as of 16 March 2014 (UTC)

Rico Wolven (born 25 Maart 1990) is a Dutch professional footballer who plays as a centre back for Spakenburg in the Dutch Topklasse. He formerly played for SC Heerenveen, FC Emmen, SC Veendam and Go Ahead Eagles.
