= Rachid Ofrany =

Dutch-Moroccan footballer

Personal information
- Date of birth: 17 January 1987 (age 39)
- Place of birth: Roermond, Netherlands
- Height: 1.82 m (6 ft 0 in)
- Position: Right winger

Youth career
- Swift'36
- VVV-Venlo

Senior career*
Years	Team	Apps	(Gls)
2006–2011	VVV-Venlo	82	(9)
2009–2010	→ AGOVV (loan)	21	(2)
2011–2012	Fortuna Sittard	1	(0)
Total		104	(11)

International career
2006–2007	Netherlands U20	1	(0)
- * Club domestic league appearances and goals

Rachid Ofrany (born 17 January 1987) is a Dutch-Moroccan former professional footballer who played as a right winger.

== Club career ==
Ofrany started playing football with Swift'36 from his hometown, Roermond. He was admitted to VVV-Venlo's youth team from a young age, and played for all youth teams, until reaching the first team in summer 2006.

In the 2006–07 season, Ofrany made his debut for VVV on 11 August 2006 in the match against FC Eindhoven. The game ended 1–1, with Ofrany playing all 90 minutes. Shortly after the match, he was offered a professional contract with the club with him signing until 2010. VVV promoted to the Eredivisie, and he had a memorable moment in that season. In the 2–2 match against Ajax, he scored a lob from the half-way line in the 57th minute.

On 26 July 2009, it was announced that Ofrany moved to AGOVV on loan. After his return to VVV, he suffered a double fracture in his leg at the end of October 2010. He never fully recovered from this. In 2011, Ofrany left VVV. After a short period at Fortuna Sittard and unsuccessful trials in Thailand, Indonesia and Morocco, Ofrany decided to retire permanently from professional football in 2013.
