= Arjan van Dijk =

Dutch footballer

Personal information
- Full name: Arjan David van Dijk
- Date of birth: 17 January 1987 (age 39)
- Place of birth: Utrecht, Netherlands
- Height: 1.89 m (6 ft 2 1/2 in)
- Position: Goalkeeper

Youth career
- Sporting '70
- 1998–2000: Elinkwijk
- 2000–2008: Feyenoord

Senior career*
Years	Team	Apps	(Gls)
2008–2010	Excelsior	40	(0)
2010–2015	RKC	17	(0)
Total		57	(0)
- * Club domestic league appearances and goals as of 13 May 2015 (UTC)

Arjan van Dijk (born 17 January 1987) is a Dutch retired professional footballer who played as a goalkeeper.

== Club career ==
Born in Utrecht, Van Dijk played for local sides Sporting '70 and Elinkwijk and joined the youth team of Excelsior in 2006, making his senior debut in March 2009 against TOP Oss. He moved to RKC in summer 2010 and won the 2010–11 Eerste Divisie title with them.

In summer 2015, van Dijk moved into amateur football with USV Hercules, only to quit football over a persistent rib injury in January 2016.

== Honours ==
- Eerste Divisie: 1

2010–11
