= Theo Vogelsang =

German footballer

Personal information
- Full name: Theodor Vogelsang
- Date of birth: 23 February 1990 (age 36)
- Place of birth: Omsk, Soviet Union
- Height: 1.83 m (6 ft 0 in)
- Position: Attacking midfielder

Youth career
- –2002: SV Veldhausen
- 2002–2009: FC Twente

Senior career*
Years	Team	Apps	(Gls)
2009–2013	FC Twente	0	(0)
2010–2011	→ Go Ahead (loan)	17	(2)
2013	Kickers Offenbach	5	(0)
2014	PEC Zwolle	0	(0)
2014–2015	SV Meppen	11	(1)
2016–2020	SV Veldhausen	28	(2)
Total		61	(5)
- * Club domestic league appearances and goals

Theo Vogelsang (born 23 February 1990) is a German retired footballer who played as an attacking midfielder. He appeared in the Dutch Eerste Divisie for Go Ahead Eagles and in the 3. Liga for Kickers Offenbach.

== Honours ==
Twente

- Johan Cruijff Schaal: 2011
