= Vojtěch Machek =

Czech footballer (born 1990)

Personal information
- Full name: Vojtěch Machek
- Date of birth: 28 February 1990 (age 36)
- Place of birth: Ostrava, Czechoslovakia
- Position: Midfielder

Team information
- Current team: FK Ostrov

Youth career
- FK Nejdek
- Baník Sokolov
- 2006–2007: Sparta Prague
- 2007–2009: Feyenoord

Senior career*
| Years | Team | Apps | (Gls) |
| 2009–2010 | Feyenoord | 0 | (0) |
| 2009–2010 | → Excelsior (loan) | 9 | (0) |
| 2010–2011 | Helmond Sport | 5 | (0) |
| 2011 | Karlovy Vary | | |
| 2011–2020 | Baník Sokolov | 208 | (3) |
| 2020–2021 | SV Poppenreuth | | |
| 2021– | FK Ostrov | | |
- * Club domestic league appearances and goals as of 23:24, 27 August 2021 (UTC)

Vojtěch Machek (born 28 February 1990) is a Czech professional footballer who plays for FK Ostrov.

== Career ==
Born in Ostrava, Machek began his career in the youth team of Sparta Prague before moving to Feyenoord, and made his professional debut on loan at Excelsior during the 2009–10 season. The defender played during the 2010/2011 season six games for Helmond Sport.

After a spell at German club SV Poppenreuth in the 2020–21 season, Machek returned to the Czech Republic and joined FK Ostrov in the summer 2021.
