= Leon ter Wielen =

Dutch footballer

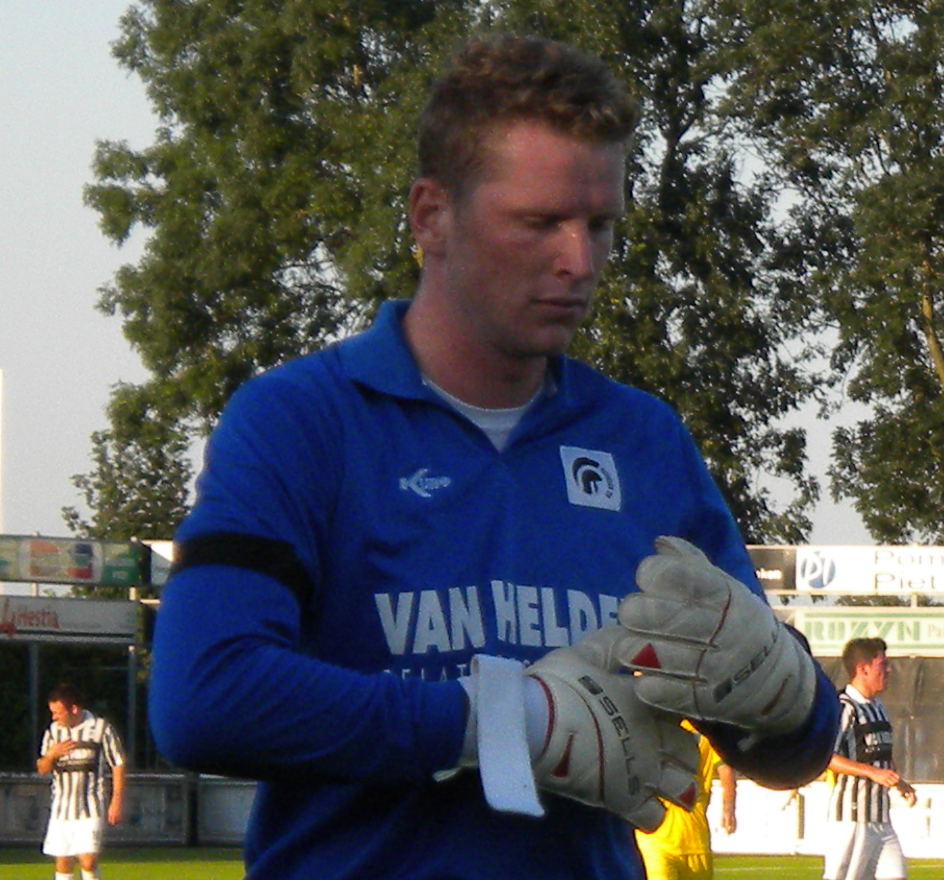

Personal information
- Full name: Leon ter Wielen
- Date of birth: 31 August 1988 (age 38)
- Place of birth: Raalte, Netherlands
- Height: 1.95 m (6 ft 5 in)
- Position: Goalkeeper

Team information
- Current team: SV Spakenburg
- Number: 1

Youth career
- Rohda Raalte
- OZC
- FC Groningen

Senior career*
Years	Team	Apps	(Gls)
2010	BV Veendam	0	(0)
2010–2014	PEC Zwolle	20	(0)
2014–2016	Achilles '29	73	(0)
2016–2017	Fortuna Sittard	10	(0)
2017–	SV Spakenburg	83	(0)
- * Club domestic league appearances and goals as of 1 July 2020

Leon ter Wielen (born 31 August 1988 in Raalte) is a Dutch professional footballer who plays as a goalkeeper for SV Spakenburg in the Dutch Tweede Divisie. He formerly played for BV Veendam and PEC Zwolle.

== Honours ==
=== Club ===
PEC Zwolle

- KNVB Cup (1): 2013–14
- Eerste Divisie (1): 2011–12
