= Rick Verbeek =

Dutch association football player

Personal information
- Full name: Rick Verbeek
- Date of birth: 14 December 1988 (age 37)
- Place of birth: Venlo, Netherlands
- Height: 1.81 m (5 ft 11 in)
- Positions: Attacking midfielder; second striker

Team information
- Current team: IVO Velden

Youth career
- IVO Velden
- VVV-Venlo

Senior career*
Years	Team	Apps	(Gls)
2007–2012	VVV-Venlo	43	(0)
2010	→ Helmond Sport (loan)	13	(0)
2013–2014	De Treffers	28	(13)
2014–2015	EVV	29	(8)
2015–2017	De Treffers	59	(14)
2017–	IVO Velden		
- * Club domestic league appearances and goals as of 11 February 2017

Rick Verbeek (born 14 December 1988 in Venlo) is a Dutch footballer who plays as an attacking midfielder for IVO Velden.

== Career ==
Verbeek was added to the first team of VVV-Venlo before the 2007–08 season. He made his professional debut on 8 August 2008, coming on as a substitute, in a 5–0 win over Go Ahead Eagles. He was loaned to Helmond Sport in January 2010, staying there for the remainder of the season.

Verbeek is the son of the former VVV player, Frank Verbeek.
