= Koen Stam =

Dutch footballer and manager

Personal information
- Date of birth: 27 February 1987 (age 39)
- Place of birth: Schagen, Netherlands
- Position: Defender

Team information
- Current team: VfL Wolfsburg (Head of Methodology)

Youth career
- SRC Schagen
- AZ

Senior career*
Years	Team	Apps	(Gls)
2005–2008	AZ	0	(0)
2006–2007	→ Cambuur (loan)	19	(0)
2007–2008	→ Excelsior (loan)	7	(0)
2008–2010	Telstar	33	(0)
2010–2011	Volendam	0	(0)

Managerial career
- 2018–2020: Jong AZ
- 2020–2021: Feyenoord U21 (assistant manager)
- 2021: Feyenoord (assistant manager)
- 2021–2025: Feyenoord Academy (Head of Methodology)
- 2025–: VfL Wolfsburg (Head of Methodology)
- * Club domestic league appearances and goals

Koen Stam (born 27 February 1987) is a Dutch former professional footballer who played as a central defender. He is the Head of Methodology at VfL Wolfsburg.

== Player career ==
Stam came through the youth ranks of vv SRC from his hometown Schagen, and was signed to the youth department of AZ. He never came further than the reserve team, and was loaned out to Cambuur in the 2006–07 season. He made his professional debut in the Eerste Divisie on 1 September 2006, in an away match against VVV-Venlo, coming on as a substitute for Shutlan Axwijk in the 76th minute. The game ended in a 3–2 defeat for Cambuur.

The following season, Stam was loaned out to Eredivisie side Excelsior. Playing only seven league matches for Excelsior, the loan period was never considered a success. Stam was signed on an amateur-contract by Eerste Divisie side Stormvogels Telstar on 2 September 2008.

== Coaching career ==
On 8 May 2018, Stam signed a two-year contract at AZ to become the new manager of Jong AZ. On 7 February 2020, Stam announced that he would not be renewing his contract at the club, and on 20 August of the same year Feyenoord announced that Stam had signed a one-year contract to become an assistant manager at the club's under-21 team. On 4 February 2020, Stam became the new assistant manager at Feyenoord's main team as replacement for Željko Petrović.

On 26 May 2021, Feyenoord announced that Stam would leave his role as assistant manager to become the new Head of Methodology at the Feyenoord Academy. As part of his new job, he will oversee how players from the Under-13 team through the Under-21 team are trained and developed. In May 2025 he began a similar role at German club VfL Wolfsburg.
