= Jong PEC Zwolle =

PEC Zwolle
- Full name: Prins Hendrik en Ende Desespereert Nimmer Combinatie Zwolle
- Nickname: Blauwvingers (Bluefingers)
- Founded: June 12, 1910 (as PEC); July 1, 1990 (as FC Zwolle)
- Ground: MAC3PARK Stadion; Zwolle
- Capacity: 14,000
- Chairman: (Netherlands) Adriaan Visser
- Manager: (Netherlands) Claus Boekweg
Home colours	Away colours

Jong PEC Zwolle (English: Young PEC Zwolle)is the reserve team of PEC Zwolle. The team has competed in the KNVB Reserve Cup.

The youth system is known for having produced some Dutch internationals like Jaap Stam, Bert Konterman and Henk Timmer.

Most of the players in Jong PEC Zwolle play in the highest youth team. Every week, a few players from the first squad appear in the reserve squad.

== Staff ==
- Head coach: Claus Boekweg
- Team manager: Jaap Stam
- Physio: Arthur Vennik

== Youth team ==
	Player	DOB	Position	Previous club
First youth team (FC Zwolle A1)
(Netherlands)	Wesley Bies	25 January 1991 (age 34)	GK	–
(Netherlands)	Rick Oosterwechel	21 March 1991 (age 34)	GK	–
(Netherlands)	Basil Camara	29 August 1992 (age 33)	DF	–
(Netherlands)	Steven Huizer	19 January 1991 (age 34)	DF	–
(Netherlands)	Simon IJzerman	13 March 1992 (age 33)	DF	–
(Netherlands)	Imre Jansen	20 February 1991 (age 34)	DF	–
(Netherlands)	Stefan Koppers	25 January 1991 (age 34)	DF	–
(Netherlands)	Jordy Bloo	5 December 1991 (age 33)	MF	–
(Netherlands)	Wahe Davtyan	7 February 1991 (age 34)	MF	–
(Netherlands)	Gillian Justiana	5 March 1991 (age 34)	MF	–
(Netherlands)	Jerrie van de Ruitenbeek	24 May 1991 (age 34)	MF	–
(Netherlands)	Niek Vossebelt	8 August 1991 (age 34)	MF	–
(Netherlands)	Yunus Aybek	13 May 1991 (age 34)	FW	–
(Netherlands)	Jesper Drost	11 January 1993 (age 32)	FW	–
(Netherlands)	Mohamed Kifeta	28 August 1991 (age 34)	FW	–
(Netherlands)	Tim Leyte	14 June 1991 (age 34)	FW	–
(Netherlands)	Kevin Olaria	18 March 1991 (age 34)	FW	–
(Netherlands)	Jarno van der Wal	21 August 1992 (age 33)	FW	– Milos Durmic 22-07-1991 MF (age 28)

== See also ==
- PEC Zwolle
