= Joey Brock =

Dutch professional footballer

Personal information
- Full name: Joey Brock
- Date of birth: 20 September 1988 (age 38)
- Place of birth: Arnhem, Netherlands
- Height: 1.73 m (5 ft 8 in)
- Position: Left back

Team information
- Current team: Veluwezoom Velp

Youth career
- Arnhemia
- 2002–2007: Vitesse
- 2007–2008: NEC

Senior career*
Years	Team	Apps	(Gls)
2008–2010	NEC	0	(0)
2010–2011	RBC	28	(0)
2011–2013	FC Den Bosch	39	(0)
2013–2014	Helmond Sport	1	(0)
2014	AFC Arnhem		
2015–2016	VV DUNO		
2016–2017	SV TEC	0	(0)
2020–	Veluwezoom Velp		
- * Club domestic league appearances and goals as of 17 June 2014 (UTC)

Joey Brock (born 20 September 1988 in Arnhem) is a Dutch professional footballer who plays as a leftback. He currently plays for Dutch amateur side Veluwezoom Velp.

== Club career ==
Brock played for NEC and RBC Roosendaal, before moving to FC Den Bosch in 2011.

He joined Helmond Sport as an amateur in 2013 after he was released by Den Bosch, who were looking to offload him after dressing room spats with teammates. In 2016 Brock moved to TEC from fellow amateurs Duno Doorwerth, whom he had joined in February 2015.

After two and a half years without club, Brock returned to the pitch when he joined Dutch amateur club, Veluwezoom Velp, in January 2020.
