= René Oosterhof =

Dutch footballer

Personal information
- Full name: René Oosterhof
- Date of birth: 1 May 1990 (age 36)
- Place of birth: Zwolle, Netherlands
- Height: 1.88 m (6 ft 2 in)
- Position: Goalkeeper

Senior career*
| Years | Team | Apps | (Gls) |
| 2009–2010 | FC Zwolle | 1 | (0) |
| 2010–2012 | SC Heerenveen | 0 | (0) |
| 2012 | → AGOVV Apeldoorn (loan | 4 | (0) |
| 2012–2013 | AGOVV Apeldoorn | 0 | (0) |
- * Club domestic league appearances and goals as of 15:05, 2 February 2012 (UTC)

René Oosterhof (born 1 May 1990) is a Dutch footballer who formerly played for FC Zwolle, SC Heerenveen and AGOVV Apeldoorn.
