= Ronnie Reniers =

Dutch footballer

Personal information
- Full name: Ronnie Reniers
- Date of birth: 8 November 1987 (age 39)
- Place of birth: Tilburg, Netherlands
- Height: 1.79 m (5 ft 10 in)
- Position: Winger

Team information
- Current team: Dessel Sport

Youth career
- Oisterwijk
- Willem II

Senior career*
Years	Team	Apps	(Gls)
2006–2010	Willem II	19	(0)
2010–2012	FC Den Bosch	54	(3)
2012–2014	PEC Zwolle	12	(0)
2014	→ FC Eindhoven (loan)	9	(0)
2014–	Dessel Sport	12	(0)
- * Club domestic league appearances and goals as of 19 June 2014 (UTC)

Ronnie Reniers (born 8 November 1987) is a Dutch footballer who plays as a winger for Dessel Sport. He formerly played for Willem II, FC Den Bosch, PEC Zwolle and FC Eindhoven.

Reniers is a forward who was born in Tilburg and made his debut in professional football, being part of the Willem II squad in the 2006–07 season.
