= Angelo Martha =

Dutch-Curaçaoan footballer (born 1982)

Personal information
- Full name: Angelo Martha
- Date of birth: 29 April 1982 (age 44)
- Place of birth: Amsterdam, Netherlands
- Height: 1.85 m (6 ft 1 in)
- Position: Centre back

Team information
- Current team: SV Spakenburg

Youth career
- Ajax

Senior career*
Years	Team	Apps	(Gls)
2002–2004	Cambuur	19	(1)
2004–2006	MVV	36	(0)
2006–2007	ADO Den Haag	5	(0)
2007–2009	Willem II	3	(0)
2009–2010	Den Bosch	29	(0)
2010–2011	AGOVV	14	(1)
2012–	SV Spakenburg		

International career^{‡}
2008–2011	Netherlands Antilles	4	(0)
2011–	Curaçao	3	(0)
- * Club domestic league appearances and goals as of September 26, 2011 ‡ National team caps and goals as of September 26, 2010

Angelo Martha (born 29 April 1982 in Amsterdam) is a Dutch-Curaçaoan footballer who currently plays for SV Spakenburg in Dutch third division. He is a defender who plays as a centre back.

Martha's career began when he signed a professional contract with Cambuur Leeuwarden, making his first first-team appearance in 2002, at the age of 20. After 2 years with the team from Friesland he joined fellow Eerste Divisie participants MVV Maastricht at the start of the 2004–05 season. He developed himself into a first team regular before moving again in December 2005. He then joined Eredivisie side ADO Den Haag. In the summer of 2007 he went to Willem II, where he did not play any match in two and a half years. Therefore, he went on loan to FC Emmen in January 2009. In the summer of 2009 he went to FC Den Bosch on a free transfer. After one season he left Den Bosch and signed a two-year contract with AGOVV Apeldoorn.

On 11 March 2007 he played his first Eredivisie 2006/2007 match for ADO against Vitesse Arnhem
