= Joep van den Ouweland =

Dutch footballer

Personal information
- Full name: Joep van den Ouweland
- Date of birth: 6 February 1984 (age 42)
- Place of birth: Gilze en Rijen, Netherlands
- Height: 1.72 m (5 ft 8 in)
- Position: Midfielder

Team information
- Current team: Gilze
- Number: 10

Youth career
- Gilze
- Willem II
- 2004: Excelsior
- 2004–2005: Feyenoord

Senior career*
Years	Team	Apps	(Gls)
2005–2010	De Graafschap	149	(6)
2010–2012	Go Ahead Eagles	56	(3)
2012–2017	FC Oss	122	(3)
2017–2018	Achilles Veen		
2018–	Gilze		
- * Club domestic league appearances and goals

Joep van den Ouweland (born 6 February 1984) is a Dutch footballer who plays for Derde Klasse club Gilze.

== Honours ==
De Graafschap

- Eerste Divisie: 2009–10
