= Giovanni Gravenbeek =

Dutch footballer

Personal information
- Full name: Giovanni Gravenbeek
- Date of birth: 11 May 1988 (age 38)
- Place of birth: Utrecht, Netherlands
- Height: 1.73 m (5 ft 8 in)
- Positions: Right-back; right midfielder

Youth career
- JSV Nieuwegein
- Hercules
- Elinkwijk
- RKC
- 2007–2009: Vitesse/AGOVV

Senior career*
Years	Team	Apps	(Gls)
2009–2010	Vitesse	9	(0)
2010–2012	Willem II	32	(0)
2012–2014	PEC Zwolle	45	(1)
2014–2015	NEC	23	(0)
2016	Dordrecht	6	(0)
2017	Rudar Pljevlja	1	(0)
2017–2019	Spakenburg	31	(1)
- * Club domestic league appearances and goals as of 19:27, 4 August 2019 (UTC)

Giovanni Gravenbeek (Dutch pronunciation: [dʑijoːˈvɑni ˈɣraːvə(m)beːk]; born 11 May 1988) is a Dutch retired footballer who played professionally for Vitesse, Willem II, PEC Zwolle, NEC and Dordrecht.

== Career ==
Gravenbeek started playing football at amateur clubs from Nieuwegein and Utrecht, before joining the RKC and Vitesse/AGOVV youth set-ups. He made his professional debut at Vitesse and later moved to Willem II and PEC Zwolle. He was signed by NEC in 2014 and moved to Dordrecht during the 2015-16 winter break.

Gravenbeek had a short spell abroad when he played for Montenegrin side Rudar Pljevlja, but left them within two months to join SV Spakenburg in August 2017. In January 2019 the club announced, that Gravenbeek would leave the club at the end of the season.

== Personal life ==
Born in the Netherlands, Gravenbeek is of Surinamese descent.

== Honours ==
=== Club ===
PEC Zwolle

- KNVB Cup (1): 2013–14

NEC

- Eerste Divisie (1): 2014–15
