= Gersom Klok =

Dutch footballer

Personal information
- Date of birth: 7 October 1990 (age 36)
- Place of birth: Lelystad, Netherlands
- Height: 1.75 m (5 ft 9 in)
- Position: Right back

Team information
- Current team: Hoogeveen
- Number: 21

Youth career
- SV Lelystad '67
- ACV
- Veendam

Senior career*
Years	Team	Apps	(Gls)
2006–2010	Veendam	35	(1)
2010–2011	Go Ahead Eagles	22	(0)
2011–2016	HHC Hardenberg	146	(13)
2016–2019	Emmen	90	(1)
2019–2025	HHC Hardenberg	107	(9)
2025–	Hoogeveen	12	(0)
- * Club domestic league appearances and goals as of 8 November 2025

Gersom Klok (born 7 October 1990) is a Dutch footballer who plays as a right back for Hoogeveen.

== Club career ==
Klok made his professional debut in the Eerste Divisie for SC Veendam in the 2006–07 season.
