= Jahmill Flu =

Dutch footballer (born 1988)

Personal information
- Date of birth: 24 August 1988 (age 38)
- Place of birth: Utrecht, Netherlands
- Position: Left-back

Youth career
- –2001: Elinkwijk
- 2001–2006: PSV

Senior career*
| Years | Team | Apps | (Gls) |
| 2006–2008 | Jong PSV | | |
| 2008–2010 | Jong Utrecht | | |
| 2010–2011 | RBC | 3 | (0) |
| 2011–2013 | Volendam | 2 | (0) |
| 2013 | Ajax Amateurs | | |
| 2013–2014 | Alphense Boys | | |
| 2014–2015 | Magreb '90 | | |
| 2015–2016 | DFS | | |
| 2016–2017 | SV Spero | | |
- * Club domestic league appearances and goals

Jahmill Flu (born 24 August 1988) is a Dutch former professional footballer, who played as a left-back. He subsequently worked in human resources.

== Club career ==
A prospect of the PSV academy, Flu moved to the Utrecht youth academy in 2008.

=== Professional football ===
Flu joined RBC Roosendaal in July 2010, where he made his professional debut in the second-tier Eerste Divisie on 15 April 2011 in a 2–0 loss to Fortuna Sittard. He made three total appearances for RBC.

In the summer of 2011, Flue moved to league rivals of Volendam. In November 2011, Flu tore his achilles tendon in a match against Telstar, sidelining him for six months. Earlier in his career, he had suffered hip and meniscus injuries. Flu returned to practice in April 2012. On 21 December 2012, it was announced that Flu would leave Volendam due to lacking playing time.

=== Amateur football ===
Flu joined the Ajax Amateurs in the Hoofdklasse, before moving to Alphense Boys in March 2013. A year later, in 2014, Flu moved to Magreb '90 playing in the Hoofdklasse.

Flu signed with DFS in May 2015. He joined SV Spero in the Tweede Klasse in 2016. In 2017, he retired due to recurring injuries.
