= Roy Pistoor =

Dutch footballer

Personal information
- Date of birth: 4 March 1990 (age 36)
- Place of birth: Alkmaar, Netherlands
- Height: 1.83 m (6 ft 0 in)
- Position: Goalkeeper

Team information
- Current team: De Dijk (on loan from Almere City)
- Number: 13

Youth career
- ADO '20
- FC Utrecht
- 2009–2010: AFC '34

Senior career*
Years	Team	Apps	(Gls)
2010–2011	AGOVV Apeldoorn	0	(0)
2011–2012	Helmond Sport	0	(0)
2012–2014	FC Volendam	10	(0)
2015–	Almere City	1	(0)
2018–	→ De Dijk (loan)	15	(0)
- * Club domestic league appearances and goals as of 17 May 2018

Roy Pistoor (born 4 March 1990) is a Dutch football player who plays for ASV De Dijk on loan from Almere City FC.

== Club career ==
He made his professional debut in the Eerste Divisie for FC Volendam on 22 October 2012 in a game against Sparta Rotterdam.
