= Soufiane Dadda =

Dutch-Moroccan footballer (born 1990)

Personal information
- Full name: Soufiane Dadda
- Date of birth: 18 June 1990 (age 36)
- Place of birth: Venlo, Netherlands
- Height: 1.73 m (5 ft 8 in)
- Position: Winger

Team information
- Current team: Vitesse '08

Youth career
- VV VOS
- Quick Boys '31
- VVV-Venlo

Senior career*
| Years | Team | Apps | (Gls) |
| 2008–2012 | VVV-Venlo | 33 | (2) |
| 2010 | → Fortuna Sittard (loan) | 12 | (0) |
| 2012–2014 | FC Eindhoven | 20 | (7) |
| 2015 | De Treffers | 20 | (7) |
| 2015–2016 | Vitesse '08 | 10 | (1) |
| 2016–2017 | Rood Wit | | |
| 2017–2019 | Alverna | | |
| 2019–2020 | Germania | | |
| 2020– | Vitesse '08 | | |
- * Club domestic league appearances and goals as of 25 October 2020

Soufiane Dadda (born 18 June 1990) is a Dutch-Moroccan footballer who plays for amateur side Vitesse '08.

== Club career ==
He made his professional debut for VVV-Venlo in August 2008 against Go Ahead Eagles in the Eerste Divisie. He also played for Fortuna Sittard, whom he joined on loan from VVV in 2010, and FC Eindhoven.

He joined amateur side De Treffers in January 2015, and later played for Vitesse '08 and Rood Wit Groesbeek. In 2017, Dadda joined VV Alverna and in 2019 moved to VV Germania in Groesbeek. He returned to Vitesse '08 in mid-2020.
