= Hubertson Pauletta =

Curaçao footballer

Personal information
- Full name: Hubertson Samuel Pauletta
- Date of birth: 3 June 1989 (age 37)
- Place of birth: Willemstad, Netherlands Antilles
- Height: 1.82 m (6 ft 0 in)
- Position: Defender

Youth career
- 2006–2007: ADO Den Haag
- 2007–2008: RKC Waalwijk

Senior career*
Years	Team	Apps	(Gls)
2008–2010	RKC Waalwijk	1	(0)
2011–2012	SC Feyenoord		
2016–2017	SV Lombardijen		

International career
2011	Curaçao	3	(0)
- * Club domestic league appearances and goals

Hubertson Samuel Pauletta (born 3 June 1989) is a Curaçaoan former professional footballer who played as a defender.

== Club career ==
Born in Willemstad, Netherlands Antilles, Pauletta played in the Netherlands for ADO Den Haag, RKC Waalwijk, SC Feyenoord and SV Lombardijen. For RKC Waalwijk, he began training with the first-team in June 2008. He made one league and one Cup appearance. for the club, before being released in summer 2010. He then went on trial with AGOVV in July 2010.

== International career ==
In 2008 Pauletta was called up to the Netherlands Antilles under-20 team, but he pulled out to focus on his club career. He earned three senior international caps for Curaçao in 2011.
