= Romano Denneboom =

Dutch footballer

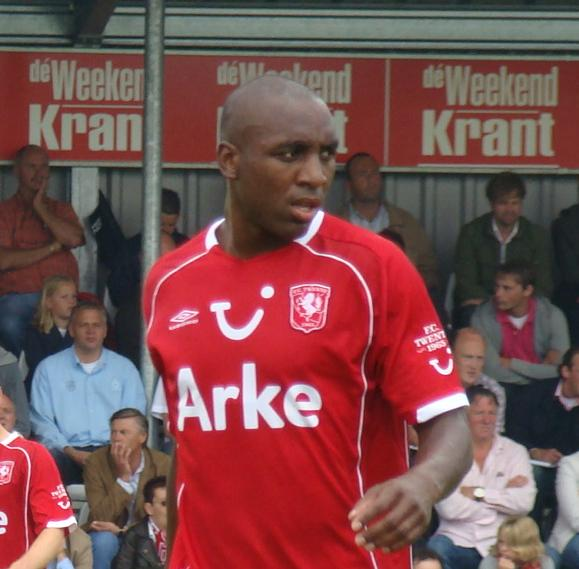
- Denneboom playing for FC Twente

Personal information
- Full name: Romano Joël Denneboom
- Date of birth: 29 January 1981 (age 45)
- Place of birth: Schiedam, Netherlands
- Height: 1.89 m (6 ft 2 in)
- Position: Striker

Youth career
- Hekelingen
- Spijkenisse

Senior career*
Years	Team	Apps	(Gls)
1998–2004	Heerenveen	112	(23)
2003–2004	→ Willem II (loan)	25	(5)
2004–2007	NEC	94	(24)
2007–2010	Twente	59	(9)
2009–2010	→ Sparta (loan)	10	(0)
2011	Arminia Bielefeld	8	(0)
2012	Harkemase Boys	16	(2)
2012–2013	Lienden		
2014–2017	DHC		

International career
2004	Netherlands	1	(0)
- * Club domestic league appearances and goals

Romano Joël Denneboom (born 29 January 1981) is a Dutch retired footballer who played as a striker.

== Club career ==
Born in Schiedam, Denneboom grew up in Spijkenisse and began his career in amateur football with local sides Hekelingen and VV Spijkenisse. After turning professional in 1998 with Heerenveen, Denneboom has also played in the Netherlands for Willem II, NEC, Twente and Sparta Rotterdam. While playing for NEC in July 2004, Denneboom turned down a chance to sign for Scottish team Aberdeen as his wife was due to give birth.

After leaving Twente in the summer of 2010, Denneboom went on trial at Scottish Premier League club Hibernian in August 2010. By September 2010, the potential move to Hibernian stalled over the length of the contract on offer.

On 11 January 2011, Denneboom signed with Arminia Bielefeld until the end of the season. On 16 November 2011, it was reported that he was on trial with Luton Town. Instead he joined Topklasse side Harkemase Boys in January 2012, only to move to Lienden a few months later. He later played for DHC and SC Kruisland, whom he joined after moving to live in Middelburg.

== International career ==
Denneboom made one international appearance for Netherlands national team in a friendly against Liechtenstein on 3 September 2004. During this match he was replaced at half time by Dirk Kuyt, who also made his first international appearance.
