= Hanne Hagary =

Dutch footballer

Personal information
- Date of birth: 27 January 1989 (age 37)
- Place of birth: Rotterdam, Netherlands
- Height: 1.79 m (5 ft 10 in)
- Position: Attacking midfielder

Team information
- Current team: JOS
- Number: 16

Youth career
- 1999–2001: XerxesDZB
- 2002–2008: Feyenoord

Senior career*
Years	Team	Apps	(Gls)
2008–2010	Feyenoord	0	(0)
2008–2009	→ Excelsior (loan)	14	(1)
2010–2011	Almere City	21	(2)
2011–2014	Lisse	79	(18)
2014–2017	IJsselmeervogels	76	(4)
2017–2018	Lisse	27	(0)
2018–	JOS	37	(6)

International career
2003–2004	Netherlands U15	3	(0)
2004–2005	Netherlands U16	5	(0)
2005–2006	Netherlands U17	8	(0)
2007	Netherlands U18	2	(0)
2008–2009	Netherlands U19	4	(0)
- * Club domestic league appearances and goals as of 21 November 2024

Hanne Hagary (born 27 January 1989) is a Dutch footballer who plays as a midfielder for Dutch Vierde Divisie club JOS.

== Club career ==
In his youth, he played for XerxesDZB, an amateur club based in Rotterdam. He later moved to the Feyenoord youth academy. He never managed to break through to Feyenoord's first team, so he was loaned out to Excelsior. In 2010, he signed with Almere City in the Dutch second division. On 16 June 2011, he signed for FC Lisse.

On 1 May 2018, Hagary moved to JOS Watergraafsmeer.

== International career ==
Represented his homeland at U-15, U-16 and U-17 level.
