= Ceriel Oosthout =

Dutch footballer

Personal information
- Full name: Ceriel Oosthout
- Date of birth: 27 September 1984 (age 42)
- Place of birth: Deventer, Netherlands
- Height: 1.90 m (6 ft 3 in)
- Position: Midfielder

Team information
- Current team: FC Hilversum

Youth career
- SV Colmschate ´33
- Go Ahead Eagles

Senior career*
Years	Team	Apps	(Gls)
2003–2010	Go Ahead Eagles	106	(5)
2010–2011	IJsselmeervogels	?	(?)
2011–	FC Hilversum	?	(?)
- * Club domestic league appearances and goals as of 28 May 2011

Ceriel Oosthout (born 27 September 1984 in Deventer) is a Dutch footballer who currently plays for FC Hilversum in the Dutch third division.

== Club career ==
He had a spell at Eerste Divisie side Go Ahead Eagles. His only previous club was SV Colmschate '33, where he played in the youth.
