= Sjors Verdellen =

Dutch footballer

Personal information
- Date of birth: 29 November 1981 (age 44)
- Place of birth: Tegelen, Netherlands
- Height: 1.83 m (6 ft 0 in)
- Position: Centre back

Senior career*
Years	Team	Apps	(Gls)
1999–2010	VVV-Venlo	284	(3)
2010–2014	MVV Maastricht	113	(1)
Total		397	(4)
- * Club domestic league appearances and goals

Sjors Verdellen (born 29 November 1981) is a Dutch former professional footballer who played as a centre back.

== Career ==
Born in Tegelen, Verdellen began his career in 1999 with VVV-Venlo, and later played with MVV Maastricht.
