= Vašek Svoboda =

Czech footballer

Personal information
- Full name: Václav Svoboda
- Date of birth: 12 January 1990 (age 36)
- Place of birth: Mělník, Czechoslovakia
- Position: Striker

Senior career*
Years	Team	Apps	(Gls)
2010–2011	Veendam	5	(0)
- * Club domestic league appearances and goals as of 22 May 2011

Václav Svoboda (born 12 January 1990) is a Czech professional footballer who played in the Dutch Eerste Divisie for Veendam as a forward.
