= Daan van Dinter =

Dutch footballer

Personal information
- Date of birth: 12 January 1989 (age 37)
- Place of birth: Tilburg, Netherlands
- Height: 1.86 m (6 ft 1 in)
- Position: Defender

Youth career
- VOAB
- Willem II

Senior career*
Years	Team	Apps	(Gls)
2007–2010	Willem II	8	(0)
2010–2013	FC Den Bosch	58	(0)
2014–2017	Achilles Veen		
- * Club domestic league appearances and goals as of 3 August 2013 (UTC)

Daan van Dinter (born 12 January 1989) is a Dutch retired footballer.

== Club career ==
He formerly played for Willem II and FC Den Bosch.

He left Achilles Veen for Oisterwijk in summer 2017, and later played for The White Boys.
