= Fabio Caracciolo =

Belgian footballer

Personal information
- Date of birth: 6 September 1984 (age 42)
- Place of birth: Genk, Belgium
- Height: 1.81 m (5 ft 11 in)
- Position: Striker

Youth career
- Zwartberg
- Tongeren
- MVV

Senior career*
Years	Team	Apps	(Gls)
2001–2007	MVV	125	(25)
2007	KVSK United	11	(1)
2007–2008	Eindhoven	38	(20)
2008–2010	ADO Den Haag	13	(1)
2009–2010	→ Den Bosch (loan)	35	(19)
2010–2011	Fortuna Sittard	31	(11)
2011–2012	CS Visé	12	(1)
2012	→ MVV (loan)	15	(4)
2012–2013	Witgoor Sport Dessel		
2013–2014	Spouwen-Mopertingen		
2014	EHC		
2014–2016	Calcio Genk		
2016–2017	KHIH Hoepertingen		
2017	Calcio Genk		
- * Club domestic league appearances and goals

Fabio Caracciolo (born 6 September 1984) is a Belgian former footballer.

Caracciolo made his debut in professional football for Dutch Eerste Divisie side MVV in 2001. In the winter of 2007, he was transferred to the Belgian club KVSK United, but half a year later, at the start of the 2007–08 Eerste Divisie season, Caracciolo moved to FC Eindhoven. He scored 17 goals in 36 matches, earning him a transfer to newly promoted Eredivisie side ADO Den Haag.

== Statistics ==
Season	Club	Country	League	Apps	Goals
2001/02	MVV	Netherlands	Eerste Divisie	2	0
2002/03	MVV	Netherlands	Eerste Divisie	6	0
2003/04	MVV	Netherlands	Eerste Divisie	33	11
2004/05	MVV	Netherlands	Eerste Divisie	30	7
2005/06	MVV	Netherlands	Eerste Divisie	37	5
2006/07	MVV	Netherlands	Eerste Divisie	17	2
2006/07	KVSK United	Belgium	Belgian Second Division	11	1
2007/08	FC Eindhoven	Netherlands	Eerste Divisie	36	17
2008/09	FC Eindhoven	Netherlands	Eerste Divisie	2	3
2008/09	ADO Den Haag	Netherlands	Eredivisie	12	1
Total				179	47

Last update: 27 December 2008
