= Benjamin van Wanrooy =

Dutch footballer

Personal information
- Full name: Benjamin van Wanrooy
- Date of birth: 4 September 1990 (age 36)
- Place of birth: Breda, Netherlands
- Position: Defender

Team information
- Current team: SteDoCo
- Number: 7

Youth career
- 2000–2009: NAC Breda

Senior career*
Years	Team	Apps	(Gls)
2008–2010	NAC Breda	1	(0)
2010–2013	Baronie		
2013–2017	UNA	82	(12)
2017–2018	Zwarte Leeuw		
2018–	SteDoCo	53	(11)
- * Club domestic league appearances and goals as of 16 September 2020

Benjamin van Wanrooy (born 4 September 1990) is a Dutch footballer who plays as a defender for Derde Divisie club SteDoCo.
