= Marcel van der Sloot =

Dutch football manager (born 1980)

Personal information
- Date of birth: 3 June 1980 (age 46)
- Place of birth: Gouda, Netherlands
- Height: 1.91 m (6 ft 3 in)
- Position: Midfielder

Team information
- Current team: Dongen (head coach)

Youth career
- SV Donk
- Jodan Boys
- ONA
- Utrecht

Senior career*
Years	Team	Apps	(Gls)
2001–2003	RBC Roosendaal	10	(0)
2003–2007	TOP Oss	122	(35)
2007–2008	De Graafschap	0	(0)
2008	→ Dordrecht (loan)	13	(2)
2008–2010	Dordrecht	29	(1)
2010	RBC Roosendaal	14	(2)
2011	Dordrecht	14	(2)
2011–2014	FC Oss	93	(23)
Total		295	(65)

Managerial career
- 2017–: TOP Oss (assistant)
- 2018–2021: RKSV Cluzona
- 2022–2023: TOP Oss (caretaker)
- 2023–: Dongen
- * Club domestic league appearances and goals

Marcel van der Sloot (born 3 June 1980) is a Dutch professional football manager and former player who is the current head coach of Vierde Divisie club Dongen.

== Playing career ==
Van der Sloot was born in Gouda and played youth football for SV Donk, Jodan Boys, ONA and Utrecht. He started his senior career with RBC Roosendaal, making his professional debut on 23 February 2002, replacing Winston Bakboord in the 60th minute of a 5–1 away win over Helmond Sport in the Eerste Divisie.

In 2003, Van der Sloot joined TOP Oss. He impressed with TOP during the next four seasons, scoring 35 goals in 122 appearances and earning a transfer to Eredivisie club De Graafschap on 3 April 2007. He signed a three-year contract. Due to several injuries, he never played a game for the club. He was sent on loan to Dordrecht in January 2008, and was later signed on a permanent deal by the club. He became a starter for the club but was also plagued by injuries, suffering an achilles tear in September 2009 which ruled him out for several months. In 2010, Van der Sloot shortly returned to RBC Roosendaal.

Between 2011 and 2014, where Van der Sloot announced his retirement from football, he played for TOP Oss again, becoming the all-time club top goalscorer with 58 goals in 215 appearances.

== Coaching career ==
After retiring as a player, Van der Sloot continued as a scout for TOP Oss between 2014 and 2017. He was appointed assistant coach in June 2017 and combined this function with the role as head coach of lower league club RKSV Cluzona from Wouw. After TOP manager Kristof Aelbrecht was fired in December 2022, Van der Sloot replaced him as caretaker coach.

On 23 December 2022, it was announced that Van der Sloot had been appointed head coach of Derde Divisie club VV Dongen from the 2023–24 season.

On 2 october 2023 NAC Breda appointed Van der Sloot head coach of NAC U18
