= Renze Fij =

Dutch footballer

Personal information
- Full name: Renze Jagger Fij
- Date of birth: 26 September 1992 (age 34)
- Place of birth: Enschede, Netherlands
- Height: 1.87 m (6 ft 2 in)
- Position: Goalkeeper

Youth career
- Victoria '28
- FC Twente

Senior career*
Years	Team	Apps	(Gls)
2009–2010	Go Ahead Eagles	1	(0)
2010–2012	Groningen	0	(0)
2012–2018	Heracles Almelo	1	(0)
2017	→ Dordrecht (loan)	14	(0)
2018	Florø	11	(0)
2019	Nest-Sotra	30	(0)
2020–2023	Sogndal	107	(0)
- * Club domestic league appearances and goals as of 18 November 2023

Renze Fij (born 26 September 1992) is a Dutch retired footballer who played as a goalkeeper.

== Club career ==
He formerly played for Go Ahead Eagles and FC Groningen. During the first half of the 2017–18 season, he played on loan for FC Dordrecht.

On 29 March 2019, he signed for Nest-Sotra on a season-long deal.

On 10 November 2019, he signed for Sogndal on a two-year-long deal.

On 21 November 2023, Sogndal announced that he had played his last match for the club.
