= Tim Hofstede =

Dutch footballer

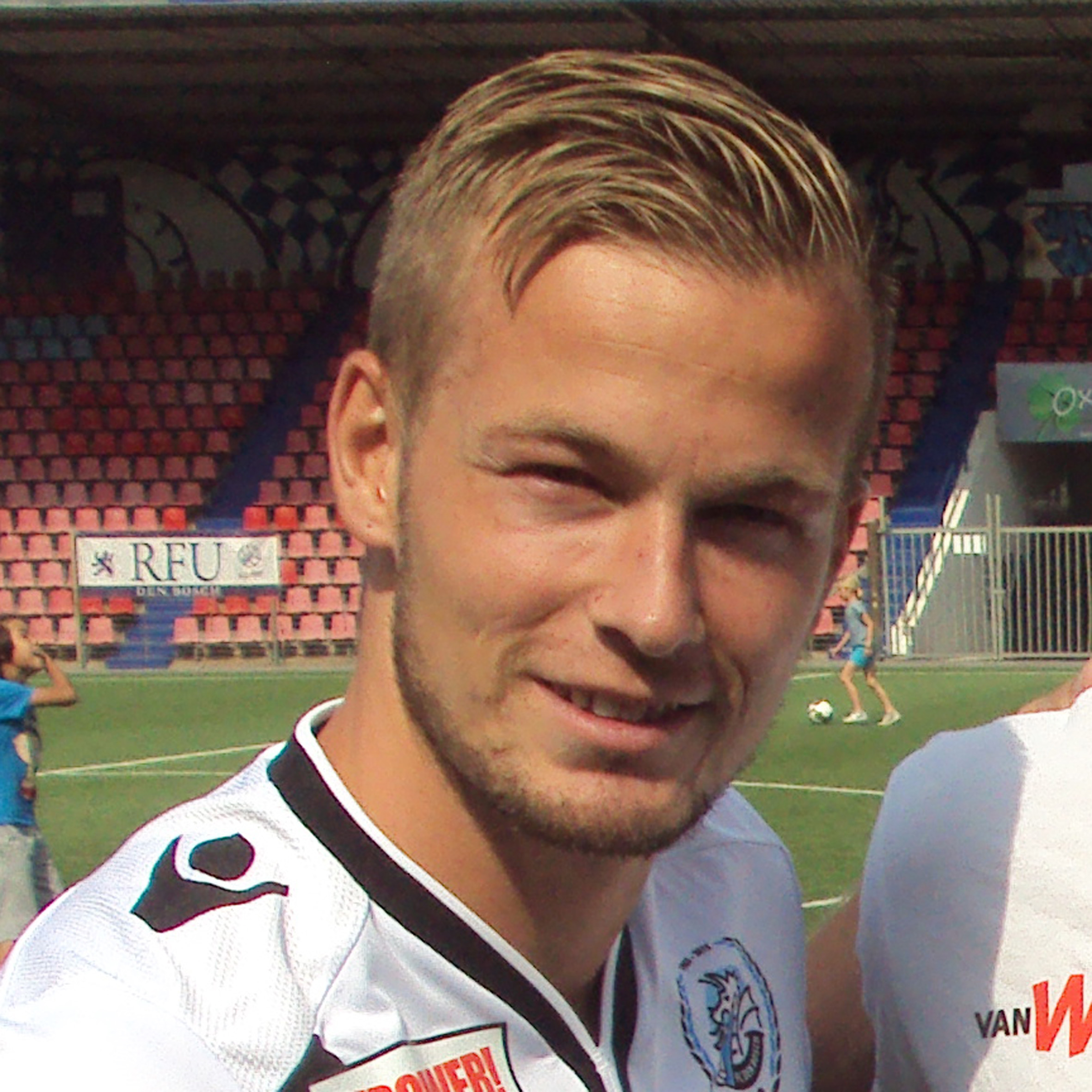
- Hofstede in 2015

Personal information
- Date of birth: 6 September 1989 (age 37)
- Place of birth: Breda, Netherlands
- Height: 1.82 m (6 ft 0 in)
- Position: Centre-back

Youth career
- VV Bavel
- NAC

Senior career*
Years	Team	Apps	(Gls)
2008–2010	NAC	5	(0)
2010–2016	FC Den Bosch	174	(2)
2016–2017	Zwarte Leeuw		
2017–2020	Hoogstraten		
- * Club domestic league appearances and goals

Tim Hofstede (born 6 September 1989) is a Dutch retiredfootballer who played as a centre-back.

Born in a Breda hospital, Hofstede grew up in Bavel and played for the local amateur club. Having started his professional career with NAC, he spent six years with FC Den Bosch. He then moved to Belgium, joining fourth-tier Zwarte Leeuw and later Hoogstraten.
