= Bernard Hofstede =

Dutch footballer (born 1980)

Personal information
- Full name: Bernard Hofstede
- Date of birth: 22 September 1980 (age 46)
- Place of birth: Tegelen, Netherlands
- Height: 1.81 m (5 ft 11 in)
- Positions: Winger; attacking midfielder

Youth career
- VCH
- VVV '03
- PSV

Senior career*
Years	Team	Apps	(Gls)
1999–2005	VVV	174	(58)
2005–2007	Heracles	12	(0)
2007	→ Volendam (loan)	13	(7)
2007–2010	Volendam	87	(18)
2010–2011	Fortuna Sittard	18	(0)
2011–2014	De Treffers	57	(16)
2014–2016	Lutlommel VV		
- * Club domestic league appearances and goals as of 30 May 2013

Bernard Hofstede (born 22 September 1980) is a Dutch retired footballer who played as a midfielder.

== Career ==
Raised in Venlo, Hofstede played for local amateur sides VCH Blerick and VVV '03 before joining the VVV and PSV youth set ups. He made his senior debut for VVV in 1999 against TOP Oss. After a spell at Heracles, he left for Volendam in 2007. After three years he returned to Limburg to play for Fortuna Sittard.

In 2011, Hofstede turned to amateur football when he was snapped up by De Treffers and later had a spell in Belgium with Lutlommel and with Achel VV.

== Personal life ==
Hofstede works as a window cleaner.
