= Christian Gandu =

Congolese footballer

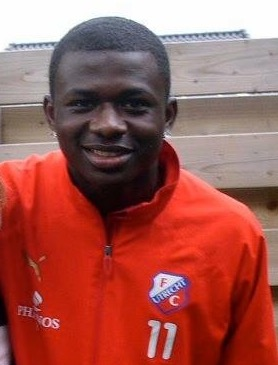

Personal information
- Date of birth: 1 July 1992 (age 34)
- Place of birth: Zaïre
- Position: Winger

Youth career
- KVVA
- 2003–2009: Utrecht
- 2009–2010: Borussia Dortmund
- 2010: Groningen

Senior career*
Years	Team	Apps	(Gls)
2010–2011	Almere City	12	(0)
2011–2013	Elinkwijk		
2013-2014	Zagłębie Sosnowiec		
2014	→ Skra Częstochowa (loan)	6	(0)
2015–2016	Magreb '90	16	(2)
2016–2018	DHSC		
2018–2019	DUNO		
2019–2023	DHSC		
2023–2024	Hilversum		

International career
2006–2007	Netherlands U15	4	(0)
- * Club domestic league appearances and goals as of 10:10, 1 July 2024 (UTC)

Christian Gandu (born 1 July 1992) is a Congolese-Dutch retired footballer who played as a winger.

== Club career ==
Gandu played youth football for Utrecht, Borussia Dortmund and Groningen, before making his professional debut in the 2010–11 Eerste Divisie season for Almere City. At Almere he got caught up in a fight with Rene Kofi Osei, who put a gun against Gandu's head in the club's dressing room.

He later played in Poland and for several amateur sides in the Netherlands.

== International career ==
Gandu played 4 matches for the Netherlands national under-15 football team.

== Personal life ==
Gandu fled his native Zaïre aged nine, ending up in the Netherlands where he started his football career. In December 2015 it was reported Gandu had to be deported from his adopted country after exhausting all legal proceedings. Just before the end of that month, Gandu was handed a definite residence permit.

In summer 2024, Gandu was reported to need a new kidney when both his kidneys only still worked for a few percent. He finally underwent a kidney transplant in February 2026.
