= Cliff Mardulier =

Belgian footballer

Personal information
- Date of birth: 22 September 1982 (age 44)
- Place of birth: Edegem, Belgium
- Height: 1.83 m (6 ft 0 in)
- Position: Goalkeeper

Youth career
- Berchem Sport

Senior career*
Years	Team	Apps	(Gls)
1999–2005	Lierse	56	(0)
2006–2007	Schoten		
2007–2010	Roda JC	0	(0)
2010–2011	MVV	2	(0)

International career
1999–2001	Belgium U18	13	(0)
2000	Belgium U19	1	(0)
2002–2003	Belgium U21	10	(0)
- * Club domestic league appearances and goals

Cliff Mardulier (born 22 September 1982) is a Belgian former professional footballer who played as a goalkeeper.
