= Quick '20 =

Dutch football club

Quick 1920
- Full name: Katholieke Voetbal Vereniging Quick 1920
- Founded: 1920
- Ground: Sportpark Vondersweijde; Oldenzaal
- Capacity: 6,500
- Chairman: Gerald Heskamp
- Manager: René Nijhuis
| Home colours | Away colours |

Quick '20 (short for Katholieke Voetbal Vereniging Quick 1920, Eng.: Catholic Football Club Quick 1920) is a football club from Oldenzaal, Netherlands. The club was founded in 1920.

In the 2019 Club Friendlies, Quick lost 11–2 to Ajax.
