= 2010–11 FC Emmen season =

Dutch football club season

FC Emmen
2010–11 season
- Stadium: De Oude Meerdijk
- Eerste Divisie: 13th
- KNVB Cup: 3rd round
- Top goalscorer: League: Ruud ter Heide (12 goals); All: Ruud ter Heide (12 goals)
- Biggest win: 6-0 (AGOVV (h) 25th week))
- Biggest defeat: 5-0 (Sparta Rotterdam (a) 10th week)
- All statistics correct as of 6 May 2011.

The 2010–11 season marked FC Emmen's 26th consecutive campaign in the Eerste Divisie, the second division of Dutch football. The club ended the league season in 13th place, while their participation in the KNVB Cup came to an end in the third round following a 3–1 defeat against SC Heerenveen.

Ruud ter Heide was FC Emmen's leading goalscorer, netting 12 goals in the Eerste Divisie. Harm Zeinstra recorded the highest number of appearances for the club, featuring in 35 matches across all competitions, including 34 league games and one cup fixture.

== Players ==
=== First-team squad ===
As of 1 March 2011

Note: Flags indicate national team as defined under FIFA eligibility rules; some limited exceptions apply. Players may hold more than one non-FIFA nationality.

| No. | Pos. | Nation | Player |
|---|---|---|---|
| — | MF | CUW | Angelo Zimmerman |
| — | DF | NED | Bart de Groot |
| — | FW | NED | Eldridge Rojer |
| — | MF | NED | Enzo Huntink |
| — | MF | NED | Erik van der Ven |
| — | DF | NED | Guus de Vries |
| — | GK | NED | Harm Zeinstra |
| — | MF | NED | Hans Denissen |
| — | MF | NED | Jeffrey de Visscher |
| — | DF | NED | Johnny de Vries |
| — | MF | NED | Kay Velda |
| — | DF | NED | Kevin Görtz |
| — | MF | BRA | Leonardo |

| No. | Pos. | Nation | Player |
|---|---|---|---|
| — | MF | GER | Marcel Piesche |
| — | FW | NED | Michel Poldervaart |
| — | FW | SUI | Miloš Malenović |
| — | DF | NED | Pele van Anholt |
| — | MF | AFG | Qays Shayesteh |
| — | MF | AUT | Radovan Mitrović |
| — | FW | NED | Randy Wolters |
| — | MF | NED | Richard Stolte |
| — | FW | NED | Ruud ter Heide |
| — | DF | NED | Sander Fischer |
| — | DF | NED | Sjors Paridaans |
| — | FW | NED | Steven de Blok |
| — | MF | SUR | Tjaronn Chery |

== Transfers ==
=== In ===
| Pos. | Player | Transferred from | Fee | Date |
|---|---|---|---|---|
| FW | (Netherlands) Eldridge Rojer | (Netherlands) FC Zwolle | Free | 1 July 2010 |
| MF | (Netherlands) Kay Velda | (Netherlands) Jong PSV | Free | 1 July 2010 |
| MF | (Netherlands) Richard Stolte | (Netherlands) SC Heerenveen | On loan | 1 July 2010 |
| FW | (Netherlands) Jeffrey de Visscher | (Netherlands) SC Cambuur | Free | 1 August 2010 |
| MF | (Afghanistan) Qays Shayesteh | (Netherlands) SC Veendam | Free | 1 August 2010 |
| MF | (Germany) Marcel Piesche | (Germany) SV Vorwärts Nordhorn | Free | 1 September 2010 |
| FW | (Netherlands) Randy Wolters | (Netherlands) Jong FC Utrecht | On loan | 1 January 2011 |
| FW | (Afghanistan) Qays Shayesteh | (Netherlands) SC Veendam | Free | 1 January 2011 |

=== Out ===
| Pos. | Player | Transferred to | Fee | Date |
|---|---|---|---|---|
| DF | (Netherlands) Arjen Bergsma | (Netherlands) SC Heerenveen | End of loan | 30 June 2010 |
| MF | (Netherlands) Erwin Buurmeijer | (Netherlands) BV Veendam | End of loan | 30 June 2010 |
| FW | (Hungary) Tamás Germán | (Hungary) Lombard Pápa Termál FC | End of loan | 30 June 2010 |
| FW | (Curaçao) Anton Jongsma | (Netherlands) WKE '16 | Free | 1 July 2010 |
| DF | (Netherlands) Niek Ripson | (Netherlands) RBC Roosendaal | Free | 1 July 2010 |
| MF | (Netherlands) Patrick Lip | (Netherlands) SC Genemuiden | Free | 1 July 2010 |
| DF | (Burkina Faso) Rahim Ouédraogo | End of career | —N/a | 1 July 2010 |
| MF | (Netherlands) Roy Stroeve | (Netherlands) HHC Hardenberg | Free | 1 July 2010 |
| DF | (Netherlands) Tim Siekman | (Netherlands) HHC Hardenberg | Free | 1 July 2010 |
| DF | (Curaçao) Timothy Cathalina | (England) Tranmere Rovers F.C. | Free | 1 July 2010 |
| FW | (Switzerland) Miloš Malenović | (Netherlands) SC Veendam | On loan | 1 January 2011 |
| FW | (Netherlands) Wesley Wakker | (Netherlands) HHC Hardenberg | Free | 1 July 2010 |
| DF | (Netherlands) Sjors Paridaans | (Netherlands) FC Eindhoven | —N/a | 1 August 2010 |
| FW | (Netherlands) Steven de Blok | (Netherlands) WKE '16 | Free | 28 January 2011 |
| MF | (Germany) Marcel Piesche | End of career | —N/a | 1 March 2011 |

== Competitions ==
=== Overall record ===
| Competition | First match | Last match | Starting round | Final position | Record | | | | | | | |
| Competition | First match | Last match | Starting round | Final position | Pld | W | D | L | GF | GA | GD | Win % |
|---|---|---|---|---|---|---|---|---|---|---|---|---|
| Eerste Divisie | 13 August 2010 | 6 May 2011 | Week 1 | 13th | 34 | 8 | 11 | 15 | 48 | 64 | −16 | 23.53 |
| KNVB Cup | 21 September 2010 | 21 September 2010 | 3rd round | 3rd round | 1 | 0 | 0 | 1 | 1 | 3 | −2 | 0.00 |
| Total | | | | | 35 | 8 | 11 | 16 | 49 | 67 | −18 | 22.86 |

Source: ESPN

=== Eerste Divisie ===
==== Results summary ====
| Overall | | | | | | | | Home | | | | | | Away | | | | | |
| Pld | W | D | L | GF | GA | GD | Pts | W | D | L | GF | GA | GD | W | D | L | GF | GA | GD |
|---|---|---|---|---|---|---|---|---|---|---|---|---|---|---|---|---|---|---|---|
| 34 | 8 | 11 | 15 | 48 | 64 | −16 | 35 | 4 | 6 | 7 | 24 | 31 | −7 | 4 | 5 | 8 | 24 | 33 | −9 |

Last updated: 23 April 2010.
Source: https://www.espn.nl/voetbal/team/scorebord/_/id/3707/competitie/NED.2/season/2010/

==== Results by round ====
| Round | 1 | 2 | 3 | 4 | 5 | 6 | 7 | 8 | 9 | 10 | 11 | 12 | 13 | 14 | 15 | 16 | 17 | 18 | 19 | 20 | 21 | 22 | 23 | 24 | 25 | 26 | 27 | 28 | 29 | 30 | 31 | 32 | 33 | 34 |
|---|---|---|---|---|---|---|---|---|---|---|---|---|---|---|---|---|---|---|---|---|---|---|---|---|---|---|---|---|---|---|---|---|---|---|
| Ground | H | A | H | A | A | H | A | A | H | A | H | A | H | A | H | A | A | H | H | A | A | H | H | A | H | A | H | H | A | H | A | H | A | H |
| Result | L | L | L | D | W | L | D | L | D | L | W | D | D | W | W | D | W | D | W | L | L | D | L | L | W | W | L | L | D | D | L | L | L | D |
| Position | | | | | | | | | | | | | | | | | | | | | | | | | | | | | | | | | | 14 |

Source: https://www.espn.nl/voetbal/team/scorebord/_/id/3707/competitie/NED.2/season/2010/ ESPN
A = Away; H = Home; W = Win; D = Draw; L = Loss

=== Matches ===
==== 1st half ====
| 13 August 2010 1st week | FC Emmen | 0–3 | PEC Zwolle | Emmen |
| 20:00 | | Report | Sjoerd Ars 1' 86' (pen.); Danny Schreurs 33' | Stadium: Unive Stadion |

| 20 August 2010 2nd week | SC Cambuur | 2–1 | FC Emmen | Leeuwarden |
| 20:00 | Nassir Maachi 50'; Reza Ghoochannejhad 78' | Report | Guus de Vries 84' | Stadium: Cambuur Stadion |

| 27 August 2010 3rd week | FC Emmen | 2–3 | MVV Maastricht | Emmen |
| 20:00 | Eldridge Rojer 16'; Tjaronn Chery 29' | Report | Tom Van Hyfte 12'; Malcolm Esajas 19'; Tom Daemen 82' | Stadium: Unive Stadion |

| 3 September 2010 4th week | BV Veendam | 1–1 | FC Emmen | Veendam |
| 20:45 | Andrew Ornoch 15' | Report | Ruud ter Heide 71' (pen.) | Stadium: De Langeleegte |

| 10 September 2010 5th week | Fortuna Sittard | 1–3 | FC Emmen | Sittard |
| 20:00 | Diogo Pinheiro 68' | Report | Jeffrey de Visscher 3'; Hans Denissen 20'; Ruud ter Heide 45+1' | Stadium: Fortuna Stadion |

| 17 September 2010 6th week | FC Emmen | 1–3 | Helmond Sport | Emmen |
| 20:00 | Tjaronn Chery 30' | Report | Marc Höcher 66'; Philipp Haastrup 67'; Bruno Andrade 90+3' | Stadium: Unive Stadion |

| 24 September 2010 7th week | Almere City FC | 1–1 | FC Emmen | Almere |
| 20:00 | Karim Fachtali 69' | Report | Eldridge Rojer 10' | Stadium: Yanmar Stadion |

| 1 October 2010 8th week | FC Den Bosch | 3–1 | FC Emmen | 's-Hertogenbosch |
| 20:00 | Niels Vorthoren 11'; Ronnie Reniers 58'; John Verhoek 79' | Report | Ruud ter Heide 38' | Stadium: De Vliert |

| 15 October 2010 9th week | FC Emmen | 3–3 | SC Telstar | Emmen |
| 20:00 | Ruud ter Heide 24' 74'; Hans Denissen 55' | Report | Benito Olenski 30'; Raymond Fafiani 50'; Johan Plat 90' | Stadium: Unive Stadion |

| 22 October 2010 10th week | Sparta Rotterdam | 5–0 | FC Emmen | Rotterdam |
| 20:00 | Lerin Duarte 43'; Kevin Strootman 54' 90+2'; Johan Voskamp 83'; Joshua John 85' | Report | | Stadium: Het Kasteel |

| 29 October 2010 11th week | FC Emmen | 2–1 | RBC Roosendaal | Emmen |
| 20:00 | Eldridge Rojer 45+2'; Ruud ter Heide 80' | Report | Niek Ripson 77' | Stadium: Unive Stadion |

| 5 November 2010 12th week | AGOVV | 2–2 | FC Emmen | Apeldoorn |
| 20:00 | Michiel Hemmen 62'; Jaime Bruinier 90' | Report | Hans Denissen 70'; Tjaronn Chery 79' | Stadium: Sportpark Berg & Bos |

| 15 November 2010 13th week | FC Emmen | 1–1 | Go Ahead Eagles | Emmen |
| 20:45 | Hans Denissen 26' | Report | Freek Heerkens 86' | Stadium: Unive Stadion |

| 22 November 2010 14th week | FC Volendam | 1–3 | FC Emmen | Volendam |
| 20:45 | Jack Tuyp 62' | Report | Jeffrey de Visscher 10'; Guus de Vries 13'; Henny Schilder 58' (o.g.) | Stadium: Kras Stadion |

| 26 November 2010 15th week | FC Emmen | 2–1 | RKC Waalwijk | Emmen |
| 20:00 | Tjaronn Chery 55'; Eldridge Rojer 75' | Report | Donny de Groot 61' | Stadium: Unive Stadion |

| 10 December 2010 16th week | FC Eindhoven | 1–1 | FC Emmen | Eindhoven |
| 20:00 | Jens van Son 50' | Report | Johnny de Vries 34' | Stadium: Jan Louwers Stadion |

==== 2nd half ====
| 14 January 2011 17th week | PEC Zwolle | 3–4 | FC Emmen | Zwolle |
| 20:00 | Danny Schreurs 10'; Pepijn Kluin 13'; Bram van Polen 26' | Report | Tjaronn Chery 19'; Guus de Vries 38'; Eldridge Rojer 44'; Hans Denissen 90+4' | Stadium: Oosterenkstadion |

| 17 January 2011 18th week | FC Emmen | 2–2 | FC Dordrecht | Emmen |
| 20:00 | Tjaronn Chery 47'; Eldridge Rojer 63' | Report | Bart van Hintum 45+1'; Moussa Kalisse 88' | Stadium: Unive Stadion |

| 21 January 2011 19th week | FC Emmen | 2–1 | Sparta Rotterdam | Emmen |
| 20:00 | Eldridge Rojer 20' 32' | Report | Joey Godee 5' | Stadium: Unive Stadion |

| 31 January 2011 20th week | MVV Maastricht | 1–0 | FC Emmen | Maastricht |
| 20:45 | Malcolm Esajas 6' | Report | | Stadium: De Geusselt |

| 4 February 2011 21st week | Go Ahead Eagles | 1–0 | FC Emmen | Deventer |
| 20:00 | Kevin van Diermen 61' | Report | | Stadium: De Adelaarshorst |

| 11 February 2011 22nd week | FC Emmen | 1–1 | FC Volendam | Emmen |
| 20:00 | Ruud ter Heide 33' | Report | Melvin Platje 69' (pen.) | Stadium: Unive Stadion |

| 14 February 2011 23rd week | FC Emmen | 0–4 | SC Cambuur | Emmen |
| 20:45 | Hans Denissen 21' 61' | Report | Reza Ghoochannejhad 38' 58' 70'; Oğuzhan Türk 67' | Stadium: Unive Stadion |

| 18 February 2011 24th week | RKC Waalwijk | 2–0 | FC Emmen | Waalwijk |
| 20:00 | Derk Boerrigter 10'; Fred Benson 32' (pen.) | Report | | Stadium: Mandemakers Stadion |

| 25 February 2011 25th week | FC Emmen | 6–0 | AGOVV | Emmen |
| 20:00 | Ruud ter Heide 18' 50' 76'; Tjaronn Chery 45' 71'; Eldridge Rojer 54' | Report | | Stadium: Unive Stadion |

| 4 March 2011 26th week | RBC Roosendaal | 1–3 | FC Emmen | Roosendaal |
| 20:00 | Ralf Seuntjens 58' (pen.) | Report | Ruud ter Heide 31' 34'; Tjaronn Chery 47' (pen.) | Stadium: RBC Stadion |

| 11 March 2011 27th week | FC Emmen | 0–1 | BV Veendam | Emmen |
| 20:00 | | Report | Miloš Malenović 88' | Stadium: Unive Stadion |

| 18 March 20011 28th week | FC Emmen | 0–2 | Fortuna Sittard | Emmen |
| 20:00 | | Report | Jerson Ribeiro 16'; Henrik Ojamaa 90+3' | Stadium: Unive Stadion |

| 1 April 2011 29th week | Helmond Sport | 2–2 | FC Emmen | Helmond |
| 20:00 | Marc Höcher 30'; Ilja van Leerdam 82' | Report | Eldridge Rojer 15'; Randy Wolters 86' | Stadium: Lavans Stadion |

| 8 April 20011 30th week | FC Emmen | 0–0 | Almere City FC | Emmen |
| 20:00 | | Report | | Stadium: Unive Stadion |

| 15 April 20011 31st week | SC Telstar | 4–1 | FC Emmen | Velsen-Zuid |
| 20:00 | Harm Zeinstra 7' (o.g.); Ilias Haddad 29'; Wouter de Vogel 32'; Kevin Brands 71' | Report | Guus de Vries 56' | Stadium: Sportpark Schoonenberg |

| 22 April 20011 32nd week | FC Emmen | 0–3 | FC Den Bosch | Emmen |
| 20:00 | | Report | Paco van Moorsel 19' (pen.) 45'; Tom van Weert 78' | Stadium: Unive Stadion |

| 29 April 2011 33rd week | FC Dordrecht | 2–1 | FC Emmen | Dordrecht |
| 20:00 | Santy Hulst 70'; Moussa Kalisse 84' | Report | Ruud ter Heide 86' | Stadium: Stadion Krommedijk |

| 6 May 2011 34th week | FC Emmen | 2–2 | FC Eindhoven | Emmen |
| 20:00 | Ruud ter Heide 23' 76' (pen.) | Report | Ratko van Simpsen 58'; Serhat Koç 90' | Stadium: Unive Stadion |

=== KNVB Cup ===
| 21 September 2010 3rd round | FC Emmen | 1–3 | SC Heerenveen | Emmen |
| 20:45 | Tjaronn Chery 84' | Report | Viktor Elm 69'; Bas Dost 82'; Mika Vayrynen 86' | Stadium: Unive Stadion |

== Statistics ==
=== Scorers ===
| # | Player | Eerste Divisie | KNVB Cup | Total |
|---|---|---|---|---|
| 1 | (Netherlands) Ruud ter Heide | 12 | 0 | 12 |
| 2 | (Netherlands) Eldridge Rojer | 9 | 0 | 9 |
| 2 | (Netherlands) Tjaronn Chery | 8 | 1 | 9 |
| 4 | (Netherlands) Guus de Vries | 4 | 0 | 4 |
| 4 | (Netherlands) Hans Denissen | 4 | 0 | 4 |
| 6 | (Netherlands) Jeffrey de Visscher | 1 | 0 | 1 |
| 6 | (Netherlands) Johnny de Vries | 1 | 0 | 1 |
| 6 | (Netherlands) Randy Wolters | 1 | 0 | 1 |

=== Appearances ===
| # | Player | Eerste Divisie | KNVB | Total |
|---|---|---|---|---|
| 1 | (Netherlands) Harm Zeinstra | 34 | 1 | 35 |
| 2 | (Suriname) Tjaronn Chery | 33 | 1 | 34 |
| 3 | (Netherlands) Hans Denissen | 32 | 1 | 33 |
| 4 | (Curaçao) Angelo Zimmerman | 31 | 1 | 32 |
| 4 | (Netherlands) Eldridge Rojer | 31 | 1 | 32 |
| 6 | (Netherlands) Guus de Vries | 31 | 0 | 31 |
| 7 | (Netherlands) Ruud ter Heide | 28 | 1 | 29 |
| 8 | (Netherlands) Bart de Groot | 27 | 1 | 28 |
| 9 | (Netherlands) Johnny de Vries | 26 | 1 | 27 |
| 10 | (Netherlands) Jeffrey de Visscher | 26 | 0 | 26 |
| 11 | (Netherlands) Sander Fischer | 21 | 0 | 21 |
| 11 | (Netherlands) Richard Stolte | 20 | 1 | 21 |
| 13 | (Netherlands) Kay Velda | 19 | 0 | 19 |
| 13 | (Netherlands) Kevin Görtz | 19 | 0 | 19 |
| 15 | (Germany) Marcel Piesche | 14 | 1 | 15 |
| 16 | (Netherlands) Randy Wolters | 12 | 0 | 12 |
| 16 | (Switzerland) Miloš Malenović | 11 | 1 | 12 |
| 18 | (Netherlands) Michel Poldervaart | 8 | 0 | 8 |
| 19 | (Afghanistan) Qays Shayesteh | 7 | 0 | 7 |
| 19 | (Netherlands) Pele van Anholt | 6 | 1 | 7 |
| 21 | (Brazil) Leonardo | 6 | 0 | 6 |
| 21 | (Austria) Radovan Mitrović | 6 | 0 | 6 |
| 23 | (Netherlands) Steven de Blok | 3 | 1 | 4 |
| 24 | (Netherlands) Erik van der Ven | 3 | 0 | 3 |
| 24 | (Netherlands) Sjors Paridaans | 3 | 0 | 3 |
| 26 | (Netherlands) Enzo Huntink | 1 | 1 | 2 |

=== Clean sheets ===
| # | Player | Eerste Divisie |
|---|---|---|
| 1 | (Netherlands) Harm Zeinstra | 2 |

=== Disciplinary record ===
| # | Player | Eerste Divisie | |
| # | Player | Yellow card | Red card |
|---|---|---|---|
| 1 | (Curaçao) Angelo Zimmerman | 2 | 2 |
| 2 | (Netherlands) Bart de Groot | 8 | 1 |
| 3 | (Netherlands) Guus de Vries | 7 | 1 |
| 4 | (Netherlands) Johnny de Vries | 5 | 1 |
| 4 | (Netherlands) Sander Fischer | 5 | 1 |
| 6 | (Netherlands) Jeffrey de Visscher | 2 | 1 |
| 7 | (Netherlands) Steven de Blok | 0 | 1 |
| 8 | (Netherlands) Kay Velda | 4 | 0 |
| 8 | (Suriname) Tjaronn Chery | 4 | 0 |
| 10 | (Netherlands) Eldridge Rojer | 3 | 0 |
| 10 | (Netherlands) Ruud ter Heide | 3 | 0 |
| 12 | (Netherlands) Kevin Görtz | 2 | 0 |
| 12 | (Netherlands) Randy Wolters | 2 | 0 |
| 14 | (Netherlands) Hans Denissen | 1 | 0 |
| 14 | (Brazil) Leonardo | 1 | 0 |
| 14 | (Germany) Marcel Piesche | 1 | 0 |
| 14 | (Switzerland) Miloš Malenović | 1 | 0 |
| 14 | (Afghanistan) Qays Shayesteh | 1 | 0 |
| 14 | (Austria) Radovan Mitrović | 1 | 0 |
| 14 | (Netherlands) Richard Stolte | 1 | 0 |
| 14 | (Netherlands) Sjors Paridaans | 1 | 0 |
