= 2010–11 FC Volendam season =

FC Volendam
2010–11 season
- Manager: Gert Kruys
- Stadium: Kras Stadion
- Eerste Divisie: 6th
- Promotion play-offs: Round 2
- KNVB Cup: Fifth round
- Top goalscorer: League: Melvin Platje (21); All: Melvin Platje (21)
- Biggest defeat: Zwolle 4–1 Volendam; Dordrecht 4–1 Volendam

The 2010–11 season was FC Volendam's 34th season in history and the second in a row in the second division, Eerste Divisie.

== Pre-season games ==
6 August 2010 Friendly	Volendam	5–0	FC Breukelen
		Report

== Competitions ==
=== Overall record ===
Competition	First match	Last match	Starting round	Final position	Record							
Competition	First match	Last match	Starting round	Final position	Pld	W	D	L	GF	GA	GD	Win %
Eerste Divisie	13 August 2010	6 May 2011	Matchday 1		34	14	9	11	56	50	+6	41.18
Eerste Divisie promotion play-offs	10 May 2011	22 May 2011	Round 1	Round 2	4	2	0	2	6	6	+0	50.00
KNVB Cup	21 September 2010	22 December 2010	Third round	Fifth round	3	2	0	1	4	3	+1	66.67
Total					41	18	9	14	66	59	+7	43.90

Source: Competitions

=== Eerste Divisie ===
==== League table ====
Pos	Team	Pld	W	D	L	GF	GA	GD	Pts	Promotion or relegation
4	Veendam (Note: Deducted 4 points by KNVB for financial irregularities the previous season.)	34	15	12	7	54	44	+10	53	Qualification for promotion play-offs Second Round (Note: Zwolle, Volendam, MVV and RKC qualified as period champions.)
5	Cambuur (Note: Deducted 3 points by KNVB for financial irregularities the previous season.)	34	15	9	10	64	52	+12	51	Qualification for promotion play-offs Second Round
6	Volendam	34	14	9	11	56	50	+6	51	Qualification for promotion play-offs First Round
7	Go Ahead Eagles	34	13	11	10	58	43	+15	50	Qualification for promotion play-offs First Round
8	Den Bosch	34	11	14	9	56	47	+9	47	Qualification for promotion play-offs First Round

Source: Eerste divisie (official site) (in Dutch)
Rules for classification: 1) points; 2) goal difference; 3) number of goals scored.

==== Results by round ====
Round	1	2	3	4	5	6	7	8	9	10	11	12	13	14	15	16	17	18	19	20	21	22	23	24	25	26	27	28	29	30	31	32	33	34
Ground	A	H	H	A	H	H	A	A	H	H	A	H	A	H	A	H	A	A	H	A	A	H	A	H	A	H	H	A	A	H	A	H	A	H
Result	D	W	D	D	W	W	W	D	W	W	W	W	W	L	L	D	D	L	L	W	L	W	D	L	D	L	L	L	L	W	L	W	W	D
Position	4	4	7	8	8	4	2	3	2	2	2	2	2	2	2	2	2	4	4	4	4	3	4	4	4	5	5	6	7	6	7	6	6	6

A = Away; H = Home; W = Win; D = Draw; L = Loss

==== Matches ====
13 August 2010 1	MVV Maastricht	2–2	Volendam	Maastricht
	Voorjans 35'; Van Hyfte 38'		Van der Werff 56'; Tuijp 59'	Stadium: De Geusselt; Attendance: 5,836; Referee: Jochem Kamphuis

20 August 2010 2	Volendam	1–0	Dordrecht	Volendam
	Platje 15'			Stadium: Kras Stadion; Attendance: 3,007; Referee: Kristian Bakkelo

29 August 2010 3	Volendam	1–1	Telstar	Volendam
	Holwijn 70'; Van der Werff (yellow card) 74' (yellow-red card) 90'; Zsidai (red card) 90+1'		Tesselaar (yellow card) 21' (yellow-red card) 90'; Dissels 86' (pen.)	Stadium: Kras Stadion; Attendance: 3,085; Referee: Jack van Hulten

3 September 2010 4	RKC Waalwijk	2–2	Volendam	Waalwijk

12 September 2010 5	Volendam	1–0	Almere City	Volendam
				Stadium: Kras Stadion

17 September 2010 6	Volendam	5–2	AGOVV	Volendam
				Stadium: Kras Stadion

24 September 2010 7	Fortuna Sittard	1–2	Volendam	Sittard

1 October 2010 8	Sparta Rotterdam	1–1	Volendam	Rotterdam

15 October 2010 9	Volendam	2–1	Go Ahead Eagles	Volendam
				Stadium: Kras Stadion

25 October 2010 10	Volendam	3–1	RBC Roosendaal	Volendam
				Stadium: Kras Stadion

1 November 2010 11	Helmond Sport	0–2	Volendam	Helmond

5 November 2010 12	Volendam	2–1	Cambuur	Volendam
				Stadium: Kras Stadion

12 November 2010 13	Den Bosch	0–1	Volendam	's-Hertogenbosch

22 November 2010 14	Volendam	1–3	Emmen	Volendam
				Stadium: Kras Stadion

26 November 2010 15	Zwolle	4–1	Volendam	Zwolle

13 December 2010 16	Volendam	0–0	FC Eindhoven	Volendam
				Stadium: Kras Stadion

14 January 2011 19	Volendam	1–2	MVV Maastricht	Volendam
				Stadium: Kras Stadion

21 January 2011 20	RBC Roosendaal	0–2	Volendam	Roosendaal

24 January 2011 17	BV Veendam	0–0	Volendam	Veendam

30 January 2011 21	Telstar	1–0	Volendam	Velsen-Zuid

6 February 2011 22	Volendam	3–1	Den Bosch	Volendam
				Stadium: Kras Stadion

11 February 2011 23	Emmen	1–1	Volendam	Emmen

14 February 2011 18	Dordrecht	4–1	Volendam	Dordrecht
				Stadium: GN Bouw Stadion

18 February 2011 24	Volendam	0–2	Zwolle	Volendam
				Stadium: Kras Stadion

25 February 2011 25	Cambuur	2–2	Volendam	Leeuwarden

4 March 2011 26	Volendam	0–1	Helmond Sport	Volendam
				Stadium: Kras Stadion

11 March 2011 27	Volendam	3–4	RKC Waalwijk	Volendam
				Stadium: Kras Stadion

18 March 2011 28	Almere City	3–2	Volendam	Almere

1 April 2011 29	AGOVV	2–1	Volendam	Apeldoorn
				Stadium: Sportpark Berg & Bos

8 April 2011 30	Volendam	2–1	Fortuna Sittard	Volendam
				Stadium: Kras Stadion

15 April 2011 31	Go Ahead Eagles	4–3	Volendam	Deventer
	Antonia 24'; Luís Pedro 64', 65', 72'		Tuijp 10', 90'; Platje 72'	Stadium: De Adelaarshorst; Attendance: 5,987; Referee: Jochem Kamphuis

22 April 2011 32	Volendam	3–1	Sparta Rotterdam	Volendam
	Platje 26', 85'; Tuijp 81'		Van den Bergh 68'	Stadium: Kras Stadion; Attendance: 4,459; Referee: Rutger Bekebrede

29 April 2011 33	Eindhoven	0–3	Volendam	Eindhoven
			Platje 41'; Halfhuid 89'; Kramer 90'	Stadium: Jan Louwers Stadion; Attendance: 1,400; Referee: Michel Winter

6 May 2011 34	Volendam	2–2	BV Veendam	Volendam
	Platje 37'; Tuijp 53'		Lambooij 64'; Kolder 90'	Stadium: Kras Stadion; Attendance: 3,446; Referee: Serdar Gözübüyük

==== Promotion play-offs ====
10 May 2011 Round 1 First leg	MVV Maastricht	2–3	Volendam	Maastricht
	Dosunmu 33'; Esajas 87'		Platje 47', 62'; Van Dijk 90'	Stadium: De Geusselt; Attendance: 6,085; Referee: Björn Kuipers

13 May 2011 Round 1 Second leg	Volendam	2–0 (5–2 agg.)	MVV Maastricht	Volendam
	Platje 68', 77'			Stadium: Kras Stadion; Attendance: 2,545; Referee: Tom van Sichem

19 May 2011 Round 2 First leg	Volendam	1–2	VVV-Venlo	Volendam
	Platje 70'		Cullen 42'; Musa 89'	Stadium: Kras Stadion; Attendance: 3,122; Referee: Richard Liesveld

22 May 2011 Round 2 Second leg	VVV-Venlo	2–0 (4–1 agg.)	Volendam	Venlo
	Cullen 6'; Boymans 64'			Stadium: De Koel; Attendance: 5,500; Referee: Danny Makkelie

=== KNVB Cup ===
21 September 2010 Third round	HVV Hollandia	1–2	Volendam	Hoorn
20:00	Boots 73'	Report	Tol 35'; De Lange 44' (pen.)	Stadium: Juliana Sportpark; Referee: Stefan Tulleners

9 November 2010 Fourth round	Dordrecht	1–2	Volendam	Dordrecht
20:00	Kalisse 65'	Report	Zsidai 2'; Schilder 78'	Stadium: GN Bouw Stadion; Referee: Pol van Boekel

22 December 2010 Fifth round	Utrecht	1–0	Volendam	Utrecht
18:45	Maguire 88' (pen.)	Report		Stadium: Stadion Galgenwaard; Referee: Bas Nijhuis
