= List of Dutch football transfers winter 2011–12 =

This is a list of transfers in Dutch football for the 2011 Winter transfer window. Only moves featuring an Eredivisie side and/or an Eerste Divisie side are listed.

The winter transfer window will open on January 1, 2011, and will close on January 31. Deals may be signed at any given moment in the season, but the actual transfer may only take place during the transfer window. Unattached players may sign at any moment.

Date	Name	Moving from	Moving to	Fee
1 September 2011	(Netherlands) Edwin de Graaf	Unattached	(Netherlands) Excelsior Rotterdam	Free
5 September 2011	(Ghana) Matthew Amoah	(Netherlands) NAC Breda	(Turkey) Mersin Idmanyurdu	€500K
8 September 2011	(Austria) Andreas Lasnik	Unattached	(Netherlands) NAC Breda	Free
8 September 2011	(Slovakia) Rok Roj	Unattached	(Netherlands) FC Volendam	Free
23 September 2011^{1}	(Netherlands) Anco Jansen	(Netherlands) SC Veendam	(Netherlands) De Graafschap	Undisclosed
24 September 2011	(Belgium) Stanley Aborah	Unattached	(Netherlands) Vitesse Arnhem	Free
3 October 2011	(Finland) Niki Mäenpää	Unattached	(Netherlands) AZ Alkmaar	Free
28 October 2011	(Hungary) Zoltán Szélesi	(Greece) Olympiacos Volos	(Netherlands) NEC Nijmegen	Free
4 November 2011	(Netherlands) Jan Vennegoor of Hesselink	Unattached	(Netherlands) PSV Eindhoven	Free
17 November 2011^{1}	(North Macedonia) Alexander Stankov	(Netherlands) Roda JC	(Netherlands) FC Oss	Loan
21 November 2011	(Netherlands) Johnny de Vries	(Netherlands) FC Emmen	(Netherlands) SC Heerenveen	Loan return
1 December 2011	(Morocco) Ali Boussaboun	Unattached	(Netherlands) ADO Den Haag	Free
4 December 2011	(Brazil) Jonathan Reis	Unattached	(Netherlands) Vitesse Arnhem	Free
16 December 2011	(Netherlands) Agil Etemadi	(Netherlands) FC Groningen	(Iran) Tractor Sazi F.C.	Undisclosed
19 December 2011^{1}	(Netherlands) Marc Höcher	(Netherlands) ADO Den Haag	(Netherlands) Willem II Tilburg	Loan
20 December 2011	(Belgium) Rheda Djellal	(Netherlands) Excelsior Rotterdam	(Belgium) Anderlecht	Loan return
20 December 2011^{1}	(Netherlands) Bart Schenkeveld	(Netherlands) Feyenoord	(Netherlands) Excelsior Rotterdam	Loan
20 December 2011^{1}	(Netherlands) Elvis Manu	(Netherlands) Feyenoord	(Netherlands) Excelsior Rotterdam	Loan
21 December 2011^{1}	(Netherlands) Diego Biseswar	(Netherlands) Feyenoord	(Turkey) Kayserispor	€200K
21 December 2011^{1}	(Japan) Mike Havenaar	(Japan) Ventforet Kofu	(Netherlands) Vitesse Arnhem	Free
22 December 2011	(Australia) Jason Davidson	Unattached	(Netherlands) Heracles Almelo	Free
22 December 2011^{1}	(Netherlands) Kaye Coppoolse	(Netherlands) De Graafschap	(Netherlands) SC Veendam	Loan
22 December 2011^{1}	(Netherlands) Dammyano Grootfaam	(Netherlands) NEC Nijmegen	(Netherlands) FC Oss	Loan
22 December 2011	(Netherlands) Moussa Kalisse	Unattached	(Netherlands) Excelsior Rotterdam	Free
23 December 2011^{1}	(Netherlands) Rangelo Janga	(Netherlands) Willem II Tilburg	(Netherlands) Excelsior Rotterdam	Loan
23 December 2011	(Spain) Óscar López	Unattached	(Netherlands) Go Ahead Eagles	Free
24 December 2011^{1}	(Netherlands) Shabir Isoufi	(Netherlands) Feyenoord	(Netherlands) FC Dordrecht	Loan
28 December 2011^{1}	(Netherlands) Lars Hutten	(Netherlands) Willem II Tilburg	(Netherlands) BV Veendam	Loan
29 December 2011	(Netherlands) Dennis van der Wal	Unattached	(Netherlands) SC Cambuur	Non-contract
31 December 2011^{1}	(Belgium) Geoffrey Hairemans	(Netherlands) De Graafschap	(Belgium) Lierse SK	Free
2 January 2012	(Belgium) Ziguy Badibanga	(Belgium) Anderlecht	(Netherlands) De Graafschap	Loan
2 January 2012	(Netherlands) Vincent Weijl	(Spain) SD Eibar	(Netherlands) SC Cambuur	Free
2 January 2012	(Netherlands) Hayri Pinarci	(Netherlands) Vitesse Arnhem	(Netherlands) AGOVV	Loan
3 January 2012	(Netherlands) Stanley Tailor	(Cyprus) Omonia Aradippou	(Netherlands) AGOVV	Free
3 January 2012	(Netherlands) Wouter de Vogel	(Netherlands) ADO Den Haag	(Netherlands) FC Dordrecht	Loan
3 January 2012	(Turkey) Suat Usta	Unattached	(Netherlands) Fortuna Sittard	Free
4 January 2012	(Netherlands) Jeffrey Leiwakabessy	(Cyprus) Anorthosis Famagusta	(Netherlands) VVV-Venlo	Free
4 January 2012	(Netherlands) Mart Lieder	(Netherlands) Purmersteijn	(Netherlands) Vitesse Arnhem	Free
4 January 2012	(Netherlands) Diego Karg	(Netherlands) FC Den Bosch	(Netherlands) Telstar	Free
4 January 2012	(Netherlands) Gianluca Nijholt	(Netherlands) FC Utrecht	(Netherlands) Almere City FC	Loan
6 January 2012	(Belgium) Fabio Caracciolo	(Belgium) CS Visé	(Netherlands) MVV Maastricht	Free
6 January 2012	(Netherlands) Ismo Vorstermans	(Netherlands) FC Utrecht	(Netherlands) VVV-Venlo	Loan
7 January 2012	(Nigeria) Ahmed Musa	(Netherlands) VVV-Venlo	(Russia) CSKA Moscow	€5M
7 January 2012	(Sweden) Pontus Wernbloom	(Netherlands) AZ Alkmaar	(Russia) CSKA Moscow	€3M
10 January 2012	(Nigeria) Kenneth Omeruo	(England) Chelsea FC	(Netherlands) ADO Den Haag	Loan
11 January 2012	(Netherlands) Michalis Vakalopoulos	(Netherlands) Vitesse Arnhem	(Netherlands) SC Veendam	Free
11 January 2012	(Morocco) Adnane Tighadouini	(Netherlands) Vitesse Arnhem	(Netherlands) FC Volendam	Loan
13 January 2012	(Ghana) Eric Addo	Unattached	(Netherlands) FC Eindhoven	Non-contract
13 January 2012	(Belgium) Gideon Boateng	(Netherlands) MVV Maastricht	(Belgium) CS Visé	Loan
13 January 2012	(Netherlands) Karim Fachtali	(Netherlands) RKC Waalwijk	(Netherlands) Go Ahead Eagles	Loan
14 January 2012	(Netherlands) Serdar Gokkaya	(Turkey) Batman Petrolspor	(Netherlands) AGOVV	Free
16 January 2012	(Netherlands) Patrick van Aanholt	(England) FC Chelsea	(Netherlands) Vitesse Arnhem	Loan
16 January 2012	(Australia) James Holland	(Netherlands) AZ Alkmaar	Austria Wien	Free
13 January 2012	(Belgium) Jordan Garcia-Calvete	(Belgium) RSC Anderlecht	(Netherlands) De Graafschap	Loan
16 January 2012	(Netherlands) Edwin Gyasi	Unattached	(Netherlands) De Graafschap	Non-contract
16 January 2012	(Netherlands) Joshua John	(Netherlands) Sparta Rotterdam	(Netherlands) FC Twente	Free
16 January 2012	(Portugal) Daniel Fernandes	(Romania) CFR Cluj	(Netherlands) FC Twente	Free
16 January 2012	(Netherlands) Toine van Huizen	(Netherlands) AZ Alkmaar	(Netherlands) Sparta Rotterdam	Free
17 January 2012	(Netherlands) Danny Holla	(Netherlands) FC Groningen	(Netherlands) VVV-Venlo	Loan
20 January 2012	(Netherlands) Steven Berghuis	(Netherlands) FC Twente	(Netherlands) VVV-Venlo	Loan
23 January 2012	(Netherlands) Genaro Snijders	(Netherlands) Vitesse Arnhem	(Netherlands) Willem II Tilburg	Loan
24 January 2012	(Netherlands) Dennis van der Ree	(Netherlands) SC Veendam	(Netherlands) AGOVV	Free
24 January 2012	(Scotland) Kevin Kerr	Unattached	(Netherlands) AGOVV	Non-contract
25 January 2012	(Netherlands) Jasar Takak	Unattached	(Netherlands) SC Cambuur	Free
25 January 2012	(Netherlands) Pim Bouwman	(Netherlands) NAC Breda	(Finland) Inter Turku	Free
25 January 2012	(Netherlands) Istvan Bakx	(Belgium) RC Genk	(Netherlands) Willem II Tilburg	Free
26 January 2012	(Hungary) Krisztián Németh	(Hungary) MTK Budapest	(Netherlands) RKC Waalwijk	Free
27 January 2012	(Netherlands) Ruud van der Rijt	(Netherlands) FC Eindhoven	(Netherlands) Willem II Tilburg	Undisclosed
27 January 2012	(Belgium) Antonio Caramazza	(Netherlands) MVV Maastricht	(Belgium) Verviers F.C.	Free
27 January 2012	(Sweden) Mattias Johansson	(Sweden) Kalmar FF	(Netherlands) AZ Alkmaar	€1.5M
27 January 2012	(Belgium) Nadjim Haroun	(Netherlands) AGOVV	(Belgium) KVK Tienen	Free
28 January 2012	(Netherlands) Michiel Hemmen	(Netherlands) AGOVV	(Belgium) KVC Westerlo	Undisclosed
30 January 2012	(Slovakia) Róbert Mazáň	(Slovakia) AS Trencin	(Netherlands) AGOVV	Loan
30 January 2012	(Slovakia) Lukáš Ďuriška	(Slovakia) AS Trencin	(Netherlands) AGOVV	Loan
30 January 2012	(Slovakia) Karol Mondek	(Slovakia) AS Trencin	(Netherlands) AGOVV	Loan
30 January 2012	(Israel) Gil Vermouth	(Germany) 1. FC Kaiserslautern	(Netherlands) De Graafschap	Loan
31 January 2012	(Netherlands) Sjoerd Overgoor	(Netherlands) De Graafschap	(Netherlands) Go Ahead Eagles	Loan
31 January 2012	(Belgium) Leroy Labylle	(Belgium) Standard Liège	(Netherlands) MVV Maastricht	Loan
31 January 2012	(Austria) Marc Janko	(Netherlands) FC Twente	(Portugal) FC Porto	€3M
31 January 2012	(Netherlands) Glynor Plet	(Netherlands) Heracles Almelo	(Netherlands) FC Twente	€1.5M
31 January 2012	(Netherlands) Ninos Gouriye	(Netherlands) FC Twente	(Netherlands) Heracles Almelo	Free
31 January 2012	(Poland) Ebi Smolarek	(Qatar) Al-Khor Sports Club	(Netherlands) ADO Den Haag	Free
31 January 2012	(Slovakia) Milan Lalkovic	(England) FC Chelsea	(Netherlands) ADO Den Haag	Loan
31 January 2012	(Netherlands) Wesley Verhoek	(Netherlands) ADO Den Haag	(Netherlands) FC Twente	€1.5M
31 January 2012	(Belgium) Jens Podevijn	(Belgium) Eendracht Aalst	(Netherlands) Willem II Tilburg	Undisclosed
31 January 2012	(Spain) Roberto Batres	(Spain) CD Alcoyano	(Netherlands) AGOVV	Free
31 January 2012	(Czech Republic) Vojtech Schulmeister	(Netherlands) Almere City FC	(Netherlands) AGOVV	Loan
31 January 2012	(Netherlands) Rowin van Zaanen	(Netherlands) Willem II Tilburg	(Netherlands) Fortuna Sittard	Loan
31 January 2012	(Netherlands) Danny Schreurs	(Netherlands) Willem II Tilburg	(Netherlands) Fortuna Sittard	Loan
31 January 2012	(Morocco) Youssef El-Akchaoui	(Netherlands) SC Heerenveen	(Netherlands) NAC Breda	Loan
31 January 2012	(Netherlands) Jeffrey Sarpong	(Spain) Real Sociedad	(Netherlands) NAC Breda	Loan
31 January 2012	(Netherlands) Stefano Seedorf	(Italy) Monza	(Netherlands) NAC Breda	Non-contract
31 January 2012	(Morocco) Nourdin Boukhari	(Turkey) Kasimpasa SK	(Netherlands) NAC Breda	Non-contract
31 January 2012	(Netherlands) Cedric van der Gun	Unattached	(Netherlands) FC Utrecht	Free
31 January 2012	(Netherlands) René Oosterhof	(Netherlands) SC Heerenveen	(Netherlands) AGOVV	Loan
31 January 2012	(Turkey) Mehmet Boztepe	(Turkey) Elazigspor	(Netherlands) FC Emmen	Free
31 January 2012	(Netherlands) Renaldo Jongebloet	(Netherlands) FC Dordrecht	(Netherlands) FC Emmen	Loan
31 January 2012	(Netherlands) Arsenio Halfhuid	Unattached	(Netherlands) FC Emmen	Free
31 January 2012	(Turkey) Ismail Oruc	(Netherlands) Haaglandia	(Netherlands) FC Emmen	Free

== Notes ==
1. Transfer will take place on 1 January 2012.
