= 2009–10 FC Volendam season =

FC Volendam
2009–10 season
- Manager: Edward Sturing (until 13 February); Johan Steur (caretaker, from 13 February)
- Stadium: Kras Stadion
- Eerste Divisie: 16th
- KNVB Cup: Round 2
- Top goalscorer: League: Jack Tuijp (16); All: Jack Tuijp (16)
- Biggest win: Volendam 6–0 FC Emmen
- Biggest defeat: BV Veendam 4–0 Volendam; Volendam 2–6 Go Ahead Eagles

The 2009–10 season is the first season of FC Volendam following their relegation from the top flight. Edward Sturing was hired as new manager on 2 June 2009.

== Transfers ==
=== In ===
Pos.	Player	From	Fee	Date	Ref.
MF	(Netherlands) Thijs Sluijter	(Cyprus) Nea Salamis	Free	1 July 2009	
DF	(Netherlands) Wouter Artz	(Belgium) Cercle Brugge	Free	1 July 2009	
FW	(Netherlands) Michiel Kramer	(Netherlands) NAC Breda	Free	1 July 2009	
GK	(Netherlands) Marco van Duin	(Netherlands) HFC Haarlem	Free	1 February 2010	

=== Out ===
Pos.	Player	To	Fee	Date	Ref.
GK	(Netherlands) Jeroen Verhoeven	(Netherlands) Ajax	€300,000	1 July 2009	
DF	(Netherlands) Tim Bakens	(Netherlands) Sparta Rotterdam	Free	1 July 2009	
MF	(Czech Republic) Vít Valenta	(Czech Republic) 1. FC Slovácko	Free	1 July 2009	

== Competitions ==
=== Overall record ===
Competition	First match	Last match	Starting round	Final position	Record							
Competition	First match	Last match	Starting round	Final position	Pld	W	D	L	GF	GA	GD	Win %
Eerste Divisie	7 August 2009	23 April 2010	Matchday 1	16th	36	8	11	17	61	81	−20	22.22
KNVB Cup	22 September 2009		Round 2	Round 2	1	0	0	1	1	2	−1	0.00
Total					37	8	11	18	62	83	−21	21.62

Source: Competitions

=== Eerste Divisie ===
==== League table ====
Pos	Team	Pld	W	D	L	GF	GA	GD	Pts
14	Omniworld	36	11	7	18	40	65	−25	40
15	Emmen	36	10	8	18	51	79	−28	38
16	Volendam	36	8	11	17	61	81	−20	35
17	Fortuna Sittard	36	7	9	20	31	57	−26	30
18	Telstar	36	7	8	21	45	65	−20	29

Source: Eerste divisie (official site) (in Dutch)
Rules for classification: 1) points; 2) goal difference; 3) number of goals scored.

==== Results summary ====
Overall								Home						Away					
Pld	W	D	L	GF	GA	GD	Pts	W	D	L	GF	GA	GD	W	D	L	GF	GA	GD
36	8	11	17	61	81	−20	35	6	6	6	35	31	+4	2	5	11	26	50	−24

Source: Worldfootball

==== Results by round ====
Round	1	2	3	4	5	6	7	8	9	10	11	12	13	14	15	16	17	18	19	20	21	22	23	24	25	26	27	28	29	30	31	32	33	34	35	36	37	38
Ground	H	A	A	H	H	A	H	A	H	A	H	H	A	H	A	A	H	A	H	A	H	H	A	A	H	A	H	H	A	H	A	H	A	A	H	A	H	A
Result	D	L	W	D	L	D	W	L	D	L	W	W	B	L	D	L	L	D	L	W	B	W	L	D	D	D	L	D	L	D	L	W	L	L	L	L	W	L
Position	9	14	9	8	11	13	9	13	13	13	12	9	11	13	12	13	13	14	14	13	13	13	14	14	14	14	14	14	15	15	16	16	16	16	16	16	16	16

Source: Worldfootball
A = Away; H = Home; B = Annulled; W = Win; D = Draw; L = Loss

==== Matches ====
7 August 2009 1	Volendam	1–1	FC Den Bosch	Volendam
	Sluijter 6'		Caracciolo 52'	Stadium: Kras Stadion; Attendance: 4,030; Referee: Jack van Hulten

14 August 2009 2	FC Omniworld	2–1	Volendam	Almere
	Haemhouts 21', 62'		Sheotahul 27'	Stadium: Mitsubishi Forkliftstadion; Attendance: 2,133; Referee: Michel Winter

21 August 2009 3	FC Eindhoven	2–3	Volendam	Eindhoven
	N'Koyi 7', 89'		Platje 27', 66'; Van Zaanen 56'	Stadium: Jan Louwers Stadion; Attendance: 1,750; Referee: Dick van Egmond

24 August 2009 4	Volendam	2–2	SC Cambuur	Volendam
	De Lange 24' (pen.), 63' (pen.)		Hese (red card) 22'; Maachi 65'; Türk 83'	Stadium: Kras Stadion; Attendance: 3,573; Referee: Danny Makkelie

28 August 2009 5	Volendam	0–3	FC Zwolle	Volendam
			Van der Haar 79' (pen.); Rojer 81'; Vossebelt 84'	Stadium: Kras Stadion; Attendance: 3,399; Referee: Jeroen Sanders

4 September 2009 6	SC Telstar	1–1	Volendam	Velsen-Zuid
	Vossebelt (red card) 19'; Olenski 39'		Platje 31'	Stadium: TATA Steel stadion Attendance: 2,285; Referee: Ben Haverkort

11 September 2009 7	Volendam	1–0	SBV Excelsior	Volendam
				Stadium: Kras Stadion

18 September 2009 8	BV Veendam	4–0	Volendam	Veendam
				Stadium: De Langeleegte

25 September 2009 9	Volendam	3–3	FC Dordrecht	Volendam
				Stadium: Kras Stadion

2 October 2009 10	Fortuna Sittard	3–2	Volendam	Sittard

9 October 2009 11	Volendam	1–0	FC Dordrecht	Volendam
				Stadium: Kras Stadion

18 October 2009 12	Volendam	6–0	FC Emmen	Volendam
				Stadium: Kras Stadion

23 October 2009 13	HFC Haarlem	v	Volendam

30 October 2009 14	Volendam	2–6	Go Ahead Eagles	Volendam
				Stadium: Kras Stadion

6 November 2009 15	AGOVV	2–2	Volendam	Apeldoorn
				Stadium: Sportpark Berg & Bos

13 November 2009 16	MVV Maastricht	5–2	Volendam	Maastricht

20 November 2009 17	Volendam	1–2	Helmond Sport	Volendam
				Stadium: Kras Stadion

27 November 2009 18	RBC Roosendaal	2–2	Volendam	Roosendaal

30 November 2009 19	Volendam	0–1	De Graafschap	Volendam
				Stadium: Kras Stadion

4 December 2009 20	FC Emmen	2–4	Volendam	Emmen

13 December 2009 21	Volendam	v	HFC Haarlem	Volendam
				Stadium: Kras Stadion

18 January 2010 22	Volendam	6–2	SC Telstar	Volendam
				Stadium: Kras Stadion

22 January 2010 24	FC Oss	1–1	Volendam	Oss

29 January 2010 25	Volendam	0–0	Fortuna Sittard	Volendam
				Stadium: Kras Stadion

5 February 2010 26	Go Ahead Eagles	0–0	Volendam	Deventer

8 February 2010 22	SBV Excelsior	4–1	Volendam	Rotterdam

12 February 2010 27	Volendam	0–1	AGOVV	Volendam
				Stadium: Kras Stadion

19 February 2010 28	Volendam	2–2	MVV	Volendam
				Stadium: Kras Stadion

26 February 2010 29	Helmond Sport	5–2	Volendam	Helmond
				Stadium: GS Staalwerken Stadion

5 March 2010 30	Volendam	3–3	RBC Roosendaal	Volendam
				Stadium: Kras Stadion

12 March 2010 32	Volendam	4–3	BV Veendam	Volendam
				Stadium: Kras Stadion

19 March 2010 33	De Graafschap	4–1	Volendam	Doetinchem
				Stadium: De Vijverberg

22 March 2010 31	FC Den Bosch	3–0	Volendam	De Vliert
				Stadium: 's-Hertogenbosch

26 March 2010 34	SC Cambuur	3–0	Volendam	Leeuwarden
				Stadium: Cambuur Stadion

2 April 2010 35	Volendam	0–2	FC Eindhoven	Volendam
				Stadium: Kras Stadion

9 April 2010 36	FC Zwolle	4–2	Volendam	Zwolle
				Stadium: MAC³PARK Stadion; Referee: Dick van Egmond

16 April 2010 37	Volendam	3–0	FC Omniworld	Volendam
	Tuijp 38', 71'; Platje 70'			Stadium: Kras Stadion; Referee: Maarten Ketting

23 April 2010 38	FC Dordrecht	3–2	Volendam	Dordrecht
	Verhoek 11'; Zeefuik 14'; Ramos 80'		Platje 59'; Versluis 86' (o.g.)	Stadium: Stadion Krommedijk; Referee: Bart van der Scheer

=== KNVB Cup ===
22 September 2009 Round 2	Volendam	1–2 (a.e.t.)	Sparta Rotterdam	Volendam
20:00	Platje 85'		Falkenburg 62'; Duarte 118'	Stadium: Kras Stadion
