= 2010–11 Eerste Divisie =

55th season of the second-tier football league in Netherlands

Eerste Divisie
- Season: 2010–11
- Champions: RKC Waalwijk
- Promoted: RKC Waalwijk
- Relegated: none

The Eerste Divisie 2010–11 was the 55th season of the Eerste Divisie since its establishment in 1956.

The previous year's winners were De Graafschap, who were replaced by last-placed 2009–10 Eredivisie club RKC Waalwijk. The league featured 18 teams, two fewer than its previous season, following the exclusion of HFC Haarlem from professional football and the relegation of FC Oss to the 2010–11 Topklasse. On May 12, 2010 BV Veendam was declared bankrupt due to financial troubles, with FC Oss consequently expected to be readmitted into Eerste Divisie to replace it; however, the verdict was overturned later in June, and the club was thus allowed to play in the season with a reduced budget.

From this season on, the last-placed team would be relegated to the Topklasse, and replaced by the winner of the newly established third tier.

This season also featured the old Almere-based club FC Omniworld under the new denomination of Almere City FC.

== Teams overview ==
=== Venues ===
Location of teams in the Eerste Divisie 2010-2011

Club	Location	Venue	Capacity
AGOVV Apeldoorn	Apeldoorn	Stadion Berg & Bos	3,250
Almere City FC	Almere	Mitsubishi Forklift Stadion	3,000
Cambuur	Leeuwarden	Cambuur Stadion	10,250
FC Den Bosch	's-Hertogenbosch	De Vliert	9,000
FC Dordrecht	Dordrecht	GN Bouw Stadion	4,100
FC Eindhoven	Eindhoven	Jan Louwers Stadion	4,600
FC Emmen	Emmen	Univé Stadion	8,600
Fortuna Sittard	Sittard	Wagner & Partners Stadion	12,500
Go Ahead Eagles	Deventer	Adelaarshorst	6,700
Helmond Sport	Helmond	Stadion De Braak	4,100
MVV	Maastricht	De Geusselt	11,026
RBC	Roosendaal	RBC Stadion	4,995
RKC	Waalwijk	Mandemakers Stadion	7,500
Sparta Rotterdam	Rotterdam	Het Kasteel	11,026
Telstar	Velsen	TATA Steel Stadion	3,625
BV Veendam	Veendam	De Langeleegte	5,290
FC Volendam	Volendam	Kras Stadion	6,260
FC Zwolle	Zwolle	FC Zwolle Stadion	10,000

== League table ==
Pos	Team	Pld	W	D	L	GF	GA	GD	Pts	Promotion or relegation
1	RKC Waalwijk (C, P)	34	22	7	5	85	40	+45	73	Promotion to the Eredivisie
2	Zwolle (Note: Deducted 1 point by KNVB for financial irregularities the previous season.)	34	20	10	4	69	27	+42	69	Qualification for promotion play-offs Second Round (Note: Zwolle, Volendam, MVV and RKC qualified as period champions.)
3	Helmond Sport	34	17	8	9	61	43	+18	59	Qualification for promotion play-offs Second Round
4	Veendam (Note: Deducted 4 points by KNVB for financial irregularities the previous season.)	34	15	12	7	54	44	+10	53	Qualification for promotion play-offs Second Round
5	Cambuur (Note: Deducted 3 points by KNVB for financial irregularities the previous season.)	34	15	9	10	64	52	+12	51	Qualification for promotion play-offs Second Round
6	Volendam	34	14	9	11	56	50	+6	51	Qualification for promotion play-offs First Round
7	Go Ahead Eagles	34	13	11	10	58	43	+15	50	Qualification for promotion play-offs First Round
8	Den Bosch	34	11	14	9	56	47	+9	47	Qualification for promotion play-offs First Round
9	Sparta Rotterdam	34	12	7	15	71	65	+6	43	
10	MVV (Note: Deducted 8 points by KNVB for financial irregularities the previous season.)	34	14	8	12	44	50	−6	42	Qualification for promotion play-offs First Round
11	Dordrecht	34	12	9	13	52	56	−4	41	
12	Eindhoven	34	10	10	14	41	49	−8	40	
13	Emmen	34	8	11	15	48	64	−16	35	
14	Telstar	34	8	10	16	43	54	−11	34	
15	AGOVV (Note: Deducted 9 points by KNVB for financial irregularities the previous season.)	34	11	7	16	54	77	−23	31	
16	Fortuna Sittard (Note: Deducted 2 points by KNVB for financial irregularities the previous season.)	34	7	7	20	42	70	−28	26	
17	RBC Roosendaal (Note: After the season, RBC Roosendaal were dissolved and restarted in the lower leagues under a new look.) (R, D)	34	7	8	19	38	66	−28	26	Bankrupt, team disbanded after season (Note: Almere City were originally relegated, but after the bankruptcy of RBC Roosendaal it was confirmed that they could keep their place in the Eerste Divisie.)
18	Almere City (Note: Deducted 6 points by KNVB for financial irregularities the previous season.)	34	8	7	19	45	84	−39	25	

Source: Eerste divisie (official site) (in Dutch)
Rules for classification: 1) points; 2) goal difference; 3) number of goals scored.
(C) Champions; (D) Disqualified; (P) Promoted; (R) Relegated

== Results ==
Home \ Away	AGO	ALM	CAM	DBO	DOR	EIN	EMM	FOR	GAE	HEL	MVV	RBC	RKC	SPA	TEL	VEE	VOL	ZWO
AGOVV		3–3	3–3	3–1	0–3	0–3	2–2	3–1	2–2	1–4	2–0	1–0	2–3	0–1	2–3	2–4	2–1	1–5
Almere City	1–6		0–4	1–1	1–2	3–0	1–1	3–0	1–2	4–0	2–4	3–1	1–3	3–1	0–0	0–2	3–2	1–3
Cambuur	0–1	4–0		2–2	3–0	2–1	2–1	2–1	4–3	1–2	2–2	2–0	1–1	3–1	2–1	0–1	2–2	3–3
Den Bosch	2–2	1–0	3–3		0–0	3–1	3–1	1–1	1–1	0–1	3–1	4–0	2–2	3–1	2–0	1–2	0–1	1–1
Dordrecht	4–1	2–4	0–1	3–4		2–2	2–1	3–0	1–1	0–1	1–0	1–1	1–2	2–3	2–2	2–2	4–1	1–2
Eindhoven	0–1	2–0	3–0	3–3	0–1		1–1	3–0	1–1	2–4	0–0	1–0	0–0	0–1	1–0	3–1	0–3	1–2
Emmen	6–0	0–0	0–4	0–3	2–2	2–2		0–2	1–1	1–3	2–3	2–1	2–1	2–1	3–3	0–1	1–1	0–3
Fortuna Sittard	1–2	1–0	2–1	0–4	1–2	2–3	1–3		0–1	3–1	0–0	2–0	1–2	3–1	2–4	3–3	1–2	0–3
Go Ahead Eagles	2–1	2–2	1–2	1–0	8–0	2–1	1–0	3–0		2–0	3–0	2–0	1–3	1–2	1–2	0–0	4–3	1–3
Helmond Sport	1–0	2–4	2–0	2–2	0–1	1–1	2–2	5–2	0–0		1–0	3–1	1–2	5–2	5–1	3–1	0–2	2–2
MVV	1–2	2–1	1–3	1–0	3–1	0–0	1–0	2–1	4–3	1–4		1–1	3–0	3–1	2–1	2–1	2–2	0–2
RBC Roosendaal	2–2	4–2	2–2	2–2	3–2	1–2	1–3	3–1	1–0	2–1	0–2		2–4	3–0	1–1	0–0	0–2	0–1
RKC Waalwijk	4–0	5–0	4–1	0–1	1–2	4–1	2–1	2–3	0–0	1–0	5–0	7–0		1–1	3–0	3–2	2–2	3–1
Sparta Rotterdam	3–3	12–1	1–3	4–0	2–2	3–1	5–0	3–3	1–1	1–1	3–0	4–1	3–4		0–2	4–2	1–1	1–2
Telstar	1–2	2–3	3–0	3–0	1–2	1–2	4–1	1–1	1–1	0–2	1–1	1–3	0–1	0–1		1–1	1–0	0–0
Veendam	1–0	5–1	1–1	1–1	2–1	1–0	1–1	4–1	1–4	0–0	1–0	2–1	3–3	3–1	2–1		0–0	1–0
Volendam	5–2	1–0	2–1	3–1	1–0	0–0	1–3	2–1	2–1	0–1	1–2	3–1	3–4	3–1	1–1	2–2		0–2
Zwolle	4–0	4–0	2–0	0–0	0–0	4–0	3–4	4–1	3–1	1–1	0–0	0–0	0–3	3–1	3–0	2–0	4–1	

Source: Eerste Divisie website
Legend: Blue = home team win; Yellow = draw; Red = away team win.

=== Playoffs ===
Excelsior and VVV-Venlo joined the Eerste Divisie-teams for the playoffs, after finishing 16th and 17th in the Eredivisie.

==== Round 1 ====
Team 1	Agg.	Team 2	1st leg	2nd leg
Volendam	5–2	MVV	3–2	2–0
Go Ahead Eagles	1–3	Den Bosch	0–1	1–2

==== Round 2 ====
Team 1	Agg.	Team 2	1st leg	2nd leg
Volendam	1−4	VVV-Venlo	1−2	0-2
Cambuur	3−3 (p. 6–7)	Zwolle	2−1	1-2
Veendam	3−4	Helmond Sport	3−3	0-1
Den Bosch	4−6	Excelsior	3−3	1-3

==== Round 3 ====
Team 1	Agg.	Team 2	1st leg	2nd leg
Zwolle	3-4	VVV-Venlo	1−2	2-2
Helmond Sport	3–9	Excelsior	1−5	2–4

VVV-Venlo and Excelsior will play in 2011–12 Eredivisie.

== Top goalscorers ==
29 goals

- (Netherlands) Johan Voskamp (Sparta Rotterdam)

27 goals

- (Netherlands) Sjoerd Ars (FC Zwolle)

21 goals

- (Netherlands) Melvin Platje (FC Volendam)

20 goals

- (Netherlands) Donny de Groot (RKC Waalwijk)
- (Netherlands) Michiel Hemmen (AGOVV Apeldoorn)

18 goals

- (Netherlands) Derk Boerrigter (RKC Waalwijk)

17 goals

- (Netherlands) Fred Benson (RKC Waalwijk)

16 goals

- (Netherlands) Koen van der Biezen (Go Ahead Eagles)
- (Netherlands) Danny Schreurs (FC Zwolle)

15 goals

- (Netherlands) Ruud ter Heide (FC Emmen)
- (Netherlands) Marc Höcher (Helmond Sport)

== Attendances ==
#	Club	Average
1	Zwolle	7,878
2	Sparta	7,008
3	Cambuur	6,465
4	MVV	5,289
5	Go Ahead	4,744
6	Den Bosch	4,417
7	RKC	4,197
8	Volendam	3,571
9	Fortuna	3,507
10	Veendam	3,256
11	Helmond	3,021
12	Emmen	2,678
13	AGOVV	2,391
14	RBC	2,164
15	Telstar	2,121
16	Eindhoven	2,113
17	Dordrecht	2,055
18	Almere	1,447

== See also ==
- 2010–11 Eredivisie
- 2010–11 Topklasse
