= Tjaronn Chery =

Surinamese footballer (born 1988)

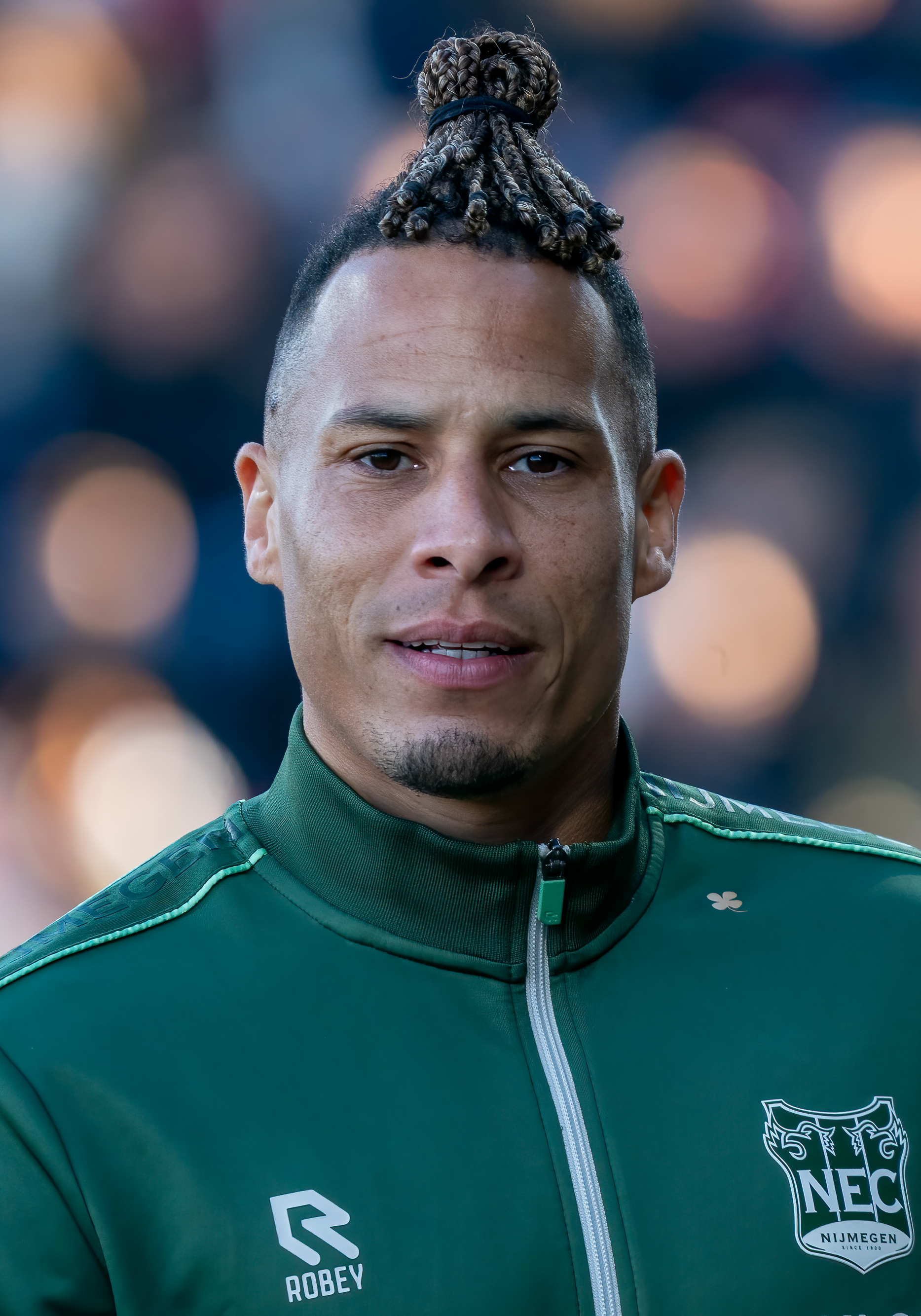
- Chery with NEC in 2024

Personal information
- Full name: Tjaronn Inteff Chefren Chery
- Date of birth: 4 June 1988 (age 38)
- Place of birth: Den Haag, Netherlands
- Height: 1.71 m (5 ft 7 in)
- Position: Attacking midfielder

Team information
- Current team: NEC
- Number: 9

Youth career
- UDI Enschede
- Victoria '28
- 2002–2008: Twente

Senior career*
Years	Team	Apps	(Gls)
2008–2010	Twente	1	(0)
2009	→ Cambuur (loan)	15	(0)
2009–2010	→ RBC (loan)	30	(1)
2010–2011	Emmen	33	(9)
2011–2014	ADO Den Haag	66	(10)
2013–2014	→ Groningen (loan)	35	(10)
2014–2015	Groningen	34	(15)
2015–2017	Queens Park Rangers	61	(14)
2017–2019	Guizhou	27	(1)
2018–2019	→ Kayserispor (loan)	33	(9)
2019–2024	Maccabi Haifa	153	(43)
2024	→ NEC (loan)	15	(5)
2024–2025	Antwerp	40	(14)
2025–	NEC	41	(14)

International career^{‡}
2021–2026	Suriname	10	(1)
- * Club domestic league appearances and goals as of 25 October 2026 ‡ National team caps and goals as of 20:38, 26 March 2026 (UTC)

Tjaronn Inteff Chefren Chery (born 4 June 1988) is a professional footballer who plays as an attacking midfielder for Eredivisie club NEC. Born in the Netherlands, he represents the Suriname national team.

== Early life ==
Chery was born in the Netherlands and is of Surinamese descent. However, when he was three, his father left his wife and they have not seen him since. Because of this, his mother raised him and his two brothers, Ronny and Tjarck, whom Tjaronn considers his heroes.

== Club career ==
=== Twente ===
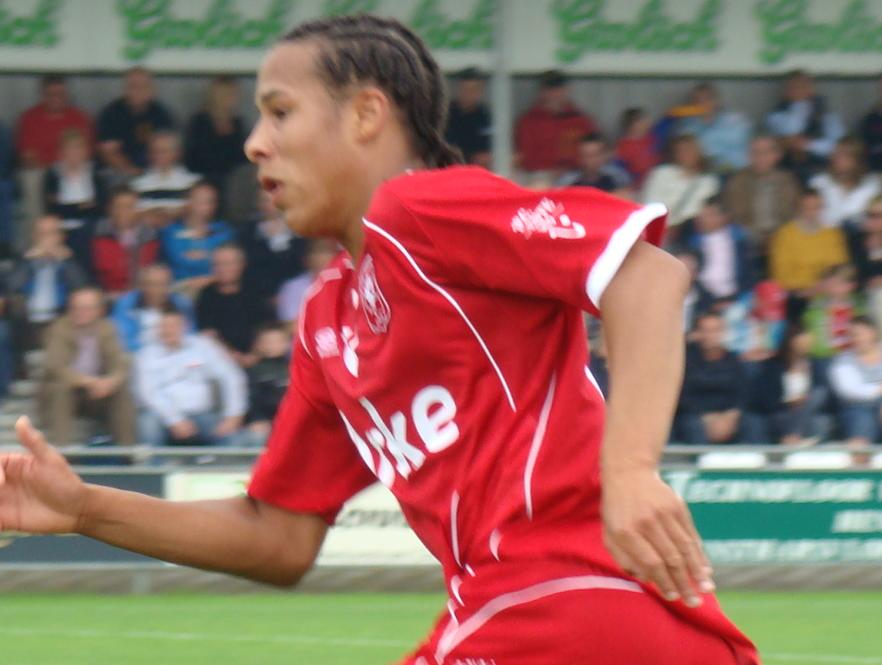
Chery pictured playing in a match whilst at Twente.

Before signing a youth contract with FC Twente, Chery played for amateur side U.D.I. Enschede until he left for Twente when he was fourteen in 2002. A fantastic season with the A-Juniors (highest youth level) culminated in winning the national championship in 2007. That year, he played 21 matches and scored 2 goals. Chery was mainly used as a substitute, playing in the same position as Qays Shayesteh.

On 16 January 2008, first team coach Fred Rutten picked Chery for the main squad. On 5 May 2008, Chery won the national reserves championship, captaining his team to the victory. That meant that he received the winner's plate. For his performance, Chery was rewarded with his first professional contract at Twente, keeping him until 2011.

On 26 October 2008, Chery made his professional debut in the Eredivisie, substituting Marko Arnautović in extra time in the away match against Vitesse. At the time he entered the pitch, the score was 0–2 to Twente which the match also ended. This turns out to be his only appearance for the club. After this, Chery was loaned out to Cambuur for the rest of the 2008–09 season. Chery then made his Cambuur debut on 16 January 2009, where he started and played the whole game, in a 1–0 win over Haarlem. Chery played a role in a match against Eindhoven on 1 May 2009 when he set up two goals, in a 3–1 win. Chery finished the season at Cambuur, making fifteen appearances.

In the 2009–10 season, Chery was loaned out again when he signed for RBC Roosendaal on a season long loan deal. Chery made his RBC Roosendaal debut, in the opening game of the season, where he set up one of the goals, in a 4–0 win over Emmen. Chery established himself in the first team, and scored his first goal on 8 March 2010 in a 1–1 draw against Emmen in their second meeting of the season. Chery went on to finish the season, making thirty–two appearances and scoring once in all competitions. During his time at Twente, Chery said that he suffered from a lot of setbacks; these were the reasons that he struggled to make a breakthrough there.

=== Emmen ===
Chery signed for Emmen on 29 July 2010. Two days later, Chery played his first Emmen match in a friendly match against his former club, Twente, which saw Emmen win 2–1. Chery started in his league debut for Emmen in the opening game of the season, a 3–0 loss against PEC Zwolle. On 27 August 2010, he scored his first Emmen goal, in a 3–2 loss against MVV Maastricht, and scored his second on 17 September in a 3–1 loss against Helmond Sport. Chery then scored two more goals by the end of 2010 and finished the first half of the season with 16 appearances and four league goals.

At the start of 2011, Chery scored two goals in two matches on 14 and 17 January 2011 against Zwolle and Dordrecht. He scored twice, in a 6–0 win over AGOVV on 25 February and scored in the next game, a 3–1 win over RBC Roosendaal. He finished his first season with 34 appearances and ten goals in all competitions, and was voted the club's player of the year.

=== ADO Den Haag ===
Chery's performance at Emmen attracted interests from clubs around Netherlands. Among interested was Eredivisie side ADO Den Haag, who made a bid for him in April. Eventually, Emmen accepted a bid for him and on 6 June 2011, Chery signed for ADO Den Haag for an undisclosed fee and signing a two–year contract, with an option of extending for two years.

Chery made his ADO Den Haag debut in the second round of UEFA Europa League first leg, where he set up one of the goals, in a 3–0 win over Tauras Tauragė. In the second round against them, Chery scored his first ADO Den Haag goal, in a 2–0 win to send them through to the next round. Chery then made his league debut for the club, in the opening game of the season, where he played 56 minutes, in a 0–0 draw against Vitesse. Chery then went on a score four goals in six games in all competitions between 21 September 2011 and 26 October 2011 against Scheveningen, Feyenoord, Roda JC and Vitesse His goal against Roda JC on 16 October 2011 almost broke the record of Koos Waslander's goal for the fastest goal in the game, just one second away. Throughout the 2011–12 season, Chery established himself in the first team and was ever present in the league, playing thirty–four times and scoring two times.

In the 2012–13 season, Chery started the opening game of the season well when he scored his first goal of the season, in a 2–2 draw against Vitesse. Two weeks later, on 25 August 2012, Chery scored twice, in a 4–2 win against VVV-Venlo. By the end of 2012, he scored two more goals before receiving a straight red card on 1 December 2012, in a 2–0 against Twente. After the match, he was suspended for three matches following Chery's refusal to serve a five match ban, initially imposed by the FA. After appealing against his suspension, Chery played against Feyenoord on 16 December 2012, where he set up one of the goals, in a 3–2 loss. As a result, his three match suspension was reduced to two instead. Later in the 2012–13 season, Chery scored three more goals against NAC Breda, Ajax and Heracles. Chery went on to finish the season, making thirty–four appearances and scoring eight times in all competitions

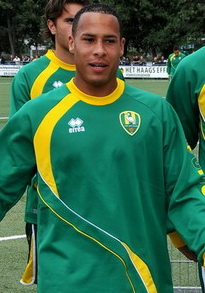
Chery pictured ahead of the club's training at ADO Den Haag.

During and after the 2012–13 season, Chery began to attract interests from clubs abroad and doubted his future at ADO Den Haag. Chances of Chery leaving the club, leading them to keen on selling him, as long as, it involves a transfer fee.

=== Groningen ===
Instead, on 23 July 2013, Chery joined Groningen on a season long loan deal until the end of the 2013–14 season. It came after when Groningen expressed interests signing him. Upon joining the club, Chery was presented and was given a number ten shirt ahead of the new season.

Chery made an immediate impact for Groningen when he scored and set up one of the goals, in a 4–1 win over NEC and was named Team of the Week by Algemeen Dagblad. His second goal came on 25 August 2013, in a 3–3 draw against Go Ahead Eagles and scored one more goal by the end of 2013 against Vitesse on 27 October 2013. He scored his first goal on 16 February 2014 in a 1–0 win over Go Ahead Eagles. Chery later scored later in the 2013–14 season against Cambuur, PSV Eindhoven, Vitesse and AZ (twice). Despite being faced with suspensions and injury, Chery finished the 2013–14 season, making thirty–eight appearances and scoring ten times in all competitions, just finishing second as the club's top scorer behind Richairo Zivkovic by one.

During the 2013–14 season, Chery joined Groningen on a permanent basis, with Emmen earning profit as a result of Chery's transfer. In the summer transfer, Chery almost joined Saudi Arabia side Al-Ahli Saudi, but the move was collapsed and stayed at the club throughout the season. Chery then started the 2014–15 season well when he scored two goals in the two games against Go Ahead Eagles and Heracles. Chery later scored three more goals by the end of 2014 for the side. Between January and April, he scored six times in twelve appearances in all competitions, including a goal against Vitesse in the quarter–finals of KNVB Cup. Chery went on to score against Cambuur, Willem II (twice), Feyenoord and NAC Breda. Chery also scored against Excelsior, as well as, setting up a goal, in a 3–0 in the semi–finals of KNVB Cup and helped the club win the KNVB Cup. It was the club's first major trophy and they qualified for the UEFA Europa League. Chery was ever present for the club in the 2014–15 season and finished the season as the club's top scorer with seventeen goals in forty–two appearances in all competitions. For his performance, Chery was voted the club's Player of the Year for the 2014–15 season.

During his time at Groningen, Chery began to play as a playmaker. With his impressive display at Groningen, Chery's future at the club became uncertain, as continuous interests from Europe increased. Chery was linked with a move to Galatasaray and Seattle Sounders FC, but ruled out a move to America, insisting on remain playing in Europe. In mid-July, Groningen accepted a bid from Queens Park Rangers for Chery and the move was proceed to medical. Following his departure, Chery departed Groningen on good terms, and he was given a farewell sendoff after a Groningen game against Cambuur in February 2016.

=== Queens Park Rangers ===
On 20 July 2015, Chery moved from FC Groningen to Championship side Queens Park Rangers for an undisclosed fee on a three-year deal. Upon joining the club, Chery describe the move as "a dream come true" to play in England and was given a number eight shirt ahead of the season. Prior to the season, Chery was named by Sky Sports as one of the six players to watch.

Chery made his competitive QPR debut in the first game of the 2015–16 Championship season, a 2–0 defeat against Charlton Athletic; he started the game and was replaced by Jay Emmanuel-Thomas in the 71st minute. He scored his first goals for the club when he scored twice against Rotherham United on 22 August 2015, followed up in the next game by scoring a winner against Huddersfield Town. He scored his fourth goal of the season and set up another, in a 4–3 win over Bolton Wanderers on 3 October. Chery then ended four months drought without a goal when he scored in a 3–1 loss against rival's Fulham on 13 February 2016. Chery went on to score six more goals, against Birmingham City, Derby County, Brentford, Middlesbrough and Leeds United. Chery made 41 appearances and scored ten goals, finishing joint top–scorer with Charlie Austin, who left Queens Park Rangers during the season. His performance this season earned him both the Ray Jones Players' Player of the Year and Junior Hoops' Player of the Year awards. He reflected favourably on his first season at the club.

The 2016–17 season saw Chery switching shirt to number ten, with new signing Jordan Cousins taking over number eight shirt. Chery started the season well when he scored three goals in five matches against Leeds United, Cardiff City and Barnsley. His free kick on 10 September 2016 in a 1–1 draw against Blackburn Rovers was nominated for September's Goal of the Month. Chery continued in the first team but lost form, rejected a new contract in late December, and announced his desire to leave in the January transfer window. He made 25 appearances and scored four times in the first half of the season.

=== Guizhou Zhicheng ===
On 13 January 2017, it was reported that Chery had transferred to Chinese Super League newcomers Guizhou, with the transfer being officially completed on 24 January. Ironically, Chery ruled out a move to China two years ago when he turned a down a move to Chinese side Jiangsu. He made his debut for Guizhou on 3 March 2017 in a 1–1 home draw against Liaoning FC.

=== Maccabi Haifa ===
On 8 August 2019, it was reported that Chery had signed a two-year deal with Maccabi Haifa of the Israeli Premier League. Chery was expected to make €420,000 plus bonuses for each of the 2019–20 and 2020–21 seasons.

Chery was one of Maccabi Haifa best players in the 2019-20 season scoring 10 goals and assisting 11. Chery continued to excel in the 2020-21 season, in which Maccabi Haifa won the championship, scoring 12 goals and assisting 5.

==== Loan to NEC ====
On 25 January 2024, Chery returned to Eredivisie and joined NEC on loan.

=== Antwerp ===
On 26 May 2024, Chery was announced as Belgian Pro League club Antwerp's first signing ahead of the 2024–25 season, joining on a two-year contract. He made his competitive debut on 28 July, starting in a 1–0 away victory over Sporting Charleroi on the opening matchday. On 11 August, he scored his first goal for the club, opening the score in a 6–1 home win over Sint-Truiden. Chery enjoyed a strong start to his tenure at Antwerp and was named Belgian Pro League Player of the Month for October, having recorded nine goals and five assists in 14 appearances by that point.

=== Return to NEC ===
On 15 June 2025, NEC announced the return of Chery, who signed a three-year contract with the Nijmegen club at the age of 37. Following the final pre-season friendly on 3 August, head coach Dick Schreuder confirmed him as NEC's new captain, succeeding the injured Bram Nuytinck. Chery made an immediate impact on the opening day of the season, registering a goal and an assist in a 5–0 win over Excelsior.

== International career ==
In May 2015, Chery was called up to the senior Netherlands squad. Two years later, Chery was invited again to train with the national side with then manager Louis van Gaal.

Previously, Chery was eligible to play for Suriname and was called up in late-December, but Groningen rejected the call-up.

Chery was given the green light by the FIFA to become selected for the Suriname national team in October 2020. He debuted with Suriname in a 6–0 win over Aruba on 28 March 2021.

== Personal life ==
In March 2015, Chery was given a leave over personal circumstances. It was later revealed that Chery lost his friend, Rico, and played against Dordrecht on 8 March 2015, in which he was in tears after scoring against them, with a 2–0 win for Groningen.

Chery has a brother, Ron, who is Chery's agent. Chery has two boys, Shane and Chez and a daughter, Jayllin.

== Career statistics ==
As of match played 25 October 2026

Appearances and goals by club, season and competition
Club	Season	League			National cup (Note: Includes KNVB Cup, FA Cup, Chinese FA Cup, Turkish Cup, Israel State Cup, Belgian Cup)		League cup (Note: Includes EFL Cup, Toto Cup)		Continental		Other		Total	
Club	Season	Division	Apps	Goals	Apps	Goals	Apps	Goals	Apps	Goals	Apps	Goals	Apps	Goals
FC Twente	2008–09	Eredivisie	1	0	0	0	—		—		—		1	0
Cambuur (loan)	2008–09	Eerste Divisie	15	0	0	0	—		—		2 (Note: Appearances in Eerste Divisie promotion play-offs)	0	17	0
RBC (loan)	2009–10	Eerste Divisie	30	1	1	0	—		—		—		31	1
FC Emmen	2010–11	Eerste Divisie	33	9	1	1	—		—		—		34	10
ADO Den Haag	2011–12	Eredivisie	34	2	2	2	—		4 (Note: Appearances in UEFA Europa League)	1	–		40	5
ADO Den Haag	2012–13	Eredivisie	32	8	2	0	—		—		—		34	8
ADO Den Haag	Total		66	10	4	2	—		4	1	—		74	13
Groningen	2013–14	Eredivisie	35	10	3	0	—		—		—		38	10
Groningen	2014–15	Eredivisie	34	15	6	2	—		2	0	—		42	17
Groningen	Total		69	25	9	2	—		2	0	—		80	27
QPR	2015–16	Championship	37	10	1	0	1	0	—		—		39	10
QPR	2016–17	Championship	22	4	0	0	3	0	—		—		25	4
QPR	Total		59	14	1	0	4	0	—		—		64	14
Guizhou	2017	Chinese Super League	18	0	1	1	—		—		—		19	1
Guizhou	2018	Chinese Super League	9	1	1	0	—		—		—		10	1
Guizhou	Total		27	1	2	1	—		—		—		29	2
Kayserispor	2018–19	Süper Lig	33	9	4	1	—		—		—		37	10
Maccabi Haifa	2019–20	Israeli Premier League	36	10	3	0	1	0	—		—		40	10
Maccabi Haifa	2020–21	Israeli Premier League	34	12	3	0	4	0	4	2	–		45	14
Maccabi Haifa	2021–22	Israeli Premier League	33	9	4	2	2	0	13 (Note: Two appearances in UEFA Champions League, ten appearances and two goals in UEFA Conference League)	2	1 (Note: Appearance in Israel Super Cup)	0	53	13
Maccabi Haifa	2022–23	Israeli Premier League	33	10	3	0	1	1	11 (Note: Appearances in UEFA Champions League)	4	1	0	49	15
Maccabi Haifa	2023–24	Israeli Premier League	17	5	0	0	1	0	11 (Note: Seven appearances and one goal in UEFA Champions League, one appearance in UEFA Europa League)	2	1	1	30	8
Maccabi Haifa	Total		153	46	13	2	8	1	39	10	3	1	217	60
NEC	2023–24	Eredivisie	15	5	3	1	—		—		—		18	6
Antwerp	2024–25	Belgian Pro League	40	14	5	4	—		—		—		45	18
NEC	2025–26	Eredivisie	33	10	4	0	—		—		—		37	10
NEC	2026–27	Eredivisie	8	4	0	0	—		7 (Note: Four appearances in UEFA Champions League, three appearances and three goals in UEFA Europa League)	3	—		15	7
NEC	Total		41	14	4	0	—		7	3	—		52	18
Career total			562	141	47	14	13	1	52	14	5	1	680	171

== Honours ==
Groningen

- KNVB Cup: 2014–15

Maccabi Haifa

- Israeli Premier League: 2020–21, 2021–22, 2022–23
- Toto Cup: 2021–22
- Israel Super Cup: 2021, 2023

Individual

- Queens Park Rangers Players' Player of the Year: 2015–16
- EFL Cup Top Assist Provider: 2016–17
- Israeli Premier League Best Foreign Player: 2020–21, 2021–22
- Belgian Pro League Player of the Month: October 2024

Sporting positions
Preceded by Neta Lavi	Maccabi Haifa F.C. captain 2023–2024	Succeeded by Lior Refaelov
