= Vakalopoulos =

Vakalopoulos is a Greek surname. Notable people with the name include:

- Apostolos Vakalopoulos (1909–2000), Greek historian
- Michalis Vakalopoulos (born 1990), Dutch-Greek footballer
- Pagonis Vakalopoulos (born 1965), Greek footballer
