= Grootfaam =

Grootfaam is a surname, likely of Dutch origin. Notable people with the surname include:

- Dammyano Grootfaam (born 1991), Dutch former professional footballer
- Jay-Ronne Grootfaam (2000-2019), better known as RS, Dutch drill rapper
- Melvin Grootfaam (born 1990), Dutch footballer
- Orlando Grootfaam (1974-2019), Surinamese professional footballer
