= Thijs Sluijter =

Dutch footballer (born 1980)

Personal information
- Date of birth: 20 February 1980 (age 46)
- Place of birth: Uitgeest, Netherlands
- Position: Winger

Team information
- Current team: SDZ Amsterdam (manager)

Senior career*
Years	Team	Apps	(Gls)
1998–2001	Heerenveen	0	(0)
2001–2006	Heracles Almelo	150	(27)
2006–2007	Litex Lovech	16	(4)
2008	AS Trenčín	13	(1)
2008–2009	Nea Salamis	24	(4)
2009–2012	Volendam	27	(3)
2011–2012	→ Almere City (loan)	39	(9)
2012–2013	Spakenburg	19	(2)
2013–2014	ADO '20	20	(9)

Managerial career
- 2010–2012: De Kennemers (assistant)
- 2010–2012: De Kennemers (reserves manager)
- 2014–2017: ADO '20
- 2017–2018: Oostzaan (assistant)
- 2018–2020: Vitesse '22
- 2020–: SDZ Amsterdam
- * Club domestic league appearances and goals

Thijs Sluijter (born 20 February 1980) is a Dutch former professional footballer who played as a left winger. He is the manager of SDZ Amsterdam.

== Playing career ==
Sluijter started his career with SC Heerenveen. In 2001, he left for Heracles. In June 2006 Sluijter signed with Litex on a free transfer, becoming the first Dutchman to play in the A PFG. Later on he also played for Nea Salamis Famagusta FC in Cyprus, and Slovak football club AS Trencin. He returned to the Netherlands and played for FC Volendam, Almere City and SV Spakenburg, before he signed with ADO '20.

== Coaching career ==
During his time at FC Volendam and Almere City FC, Sluijter worked as a youth coach for the club's alongside his playing career, as well as at AZ Alkmaar. Between 2010 and 2012 he was the manager De Kennemers' reserve team/2nd senior team, with whom he became champion in 2011. He also assisted the first team manager at the club.

Retiring at the end of the 2013–14 season, he immediately became the manager of ADO '20. This was already announced in January 2014.

In March 2017, Sluijter was appointed assistant manager of OFC Oostzaan under his former teammate at Heracles Almelo, Yuri Rose, from the upcoming season. In the last year, Sluijter had also combined his manager role at ADO '20 with a role as forward coach at SC Telstar. In February 2018 it was confirmed, that Sluijter would become the manager of Vitesse '22 from the 2018–19 season.

In January 2020, it was confirmed that Sluijter had been appointed manager of SDZ Amsterdam from the 2020–21 season.

== Honours ==
Heracles Almelo

- Eerste Divisie: 2004–05
