= Richard Stolte =

Dutch footballer

Personal information
- Date of birth: 8 January 1990 (age 36)
- Place of birth: Emmeloord, Netherlands
- Position: Midfielder

Senior career*
Years	Team	Apps	(Gls)
2009–2012	Heerenveen	1	(0)
2010–2011	→ Emmen (loan)	20	(0)
2011–2012	→ Fortuna Sittard (loan)	16	(4)
2012–2015	Excelsior	14	(0)
2016–2018	BVV Barendrecht	29	(1)
Total		80	(5)

International career
2005–2007	Netherlands U17	10	(0)
2008	Netherlands U18	3	(1)
2008	Netherlands U19	2	(0)
- * Club domestic league appearances and goals

Richard Stolte (born 8 January 1990) is a Dutch former professional footballer who played as a midfielder.

== Career ==
Stolte was born in Emmeloord, Netherlands. Before being picked up by the youth academy of SC Heerenveen, Stolte played at Flevo Boys, an amateur club from his home town. In the academy he played as a left winger, both on midfield and in attack. He also received many international call-ups from the various Dutch youth squads.

In 2008, he signed a two-year deal at Heerenveen with an option for two more seasons. The plan was to keep Stolte another year in the academy followed by one season in the reserve squad. In the summer of 2009 FC Emmen was interested in loaning him for a season, but first team manager Trond Sollied kept him at the club. With many injuries in the first team, Stolte made his professional debut in an away match against NEC Nijmegen on 7 August 2009, his only appearance with Frisians that season.

The club activated the option in Stolte's contract, keeping him at the club until the summer of 2012. He was loaned out to FC Emmen during the 2010–11 season. In Drenthe he made 20 appearances in the Eerste Divisie in which he did not score.

In June 2011, Eerste Divisie club Fortuna Sittard announced that they would loan Stolte for one season from Heerenveen.

In the summer of 2012, Stolte definitely left Heerenveen and signed with Excelsior.

In May 2016 it was announced that Stolte, after a long rehabilitation from injury, had joined new Tweede Divisie club BVV Barendrecht.
