= Radovan Mitrović =

Austrian footballer

Personal information
- Full name: Radovan Mitrović
- Date of birth: 25 May 1992 (age 34)
- Place of birth: Wien, Austria
- Height: 1.71 m (5 ft 7 1/2 in)
- Position: Midfielder

Team information
- Current team: SV Wimpassing
- Number: 10

Youth career
- 1. FC Slimmeringer SC
- 2008–2011: SC Heerenveen

Senior career*
Years	Team	Apps	(Gls)
2011	FC Emmen	6	(0)
2011–2013	FC Utrecht	0	(0)
2013–2014	SV Horn	18	(2)
2015	1. Simmeringer	2	(0)
2016–2017	SC Süssenbrunn	12	(2)
2017–2018	Casino Baden	23	(7)
2018–	SV Wimpassing	43	(6)
- * Club domestic league appearances and goals as of 23:47, 16 January 2021 (UTC)

Radovan Mitrović is an Austrian footballer who plays as a midfielder who currently plays for the Austrian club SV Wimpassing. He is of Serbian descent.
