= Harm Zeinstra =

Dutch footballer

Personal information
- Full name: Harm Zeinstra
- Date of birth: 21 July 1989 (age 37)
- Place of birth: Leeuwarden, Netherlands
- Height: 1.92 m (6 ft 4 in)
- Position: Goalkeeper

Youth career
- Cambuur
- Heerenveen

Senior career*
Years	Team	Apps	(Gls)
2009–2012	Heerenveen	0	(0)
2009–2012	→ Emmen (loan)	94	(0)
2012–2013	Emmen	1	(0)
2013–2017	Cambuur	42	(0)
2017–2018	Heracles Almelo	0	(0)
Total		137	(0)
- * Club domestic league appearances and goals

Harm Zeinstra (born 21 July 1989) is a Dutch former professional footballer who played as a goalkeeper.
