= Eldridge Rojer =

Curaçaoan footballer

Personal information
- Full name: Eldridge Rojer
- Date of birth: 13 March 1984 (age 42)
- Place of birth: Willemstad, Netherlands Antilles
- Height: 1.75 m (5 ft 9 in)
- Position: Winger

Youth career
- VV Bargeres
- Emmen
- Vitesse

Senior career*
Years	Team	Apps	(Gls)
2002–2007	Vitesse	82	(3)
2007–2009	Excelsior	20	(4)
2009–2010	Zwolle	37	(12)
2010–2013	Emmen	72	(13)
2013–2014	WKE		
2014–2017	Babberich		
2017–2018	Veluwezoom		
- * Club domestic league appearances and goals as of 21 March 2014 (UTC)

Eldridge Rojer (born 13 March 1984) is a Curaçaoan retired professional footballer who played as a winger.

== Career ==
Rojer started his career with v.v. Bargeres in Emmen, and was later scouted by FC Emmen where he played in their youth teams. Later, he began playing for the youth teams of Vitesse. In 2002, he was picked for the first team squad. He played four seasons in Arnhem, and was seen as an emerging talent, but injuries would hold him back.

In 2007, he signed with Excelsior, where he could count on more playing time. He started well for the club, but suffered a serious knee injury which kept him out for 18 months. Afterwards, media could report that he had worsened the injury after slipping during sexual intercourse with his girlfriend in the shower. This meant that he was out for another six months.

On 17 June 2009, it was announced that Rojer had signed a contract with FC Zwolle. At Zwolle, he tried to return from the injury-plagued period and make return to form. After a good season for Zwolle, scoring 12 goals in 37 matches, he left the club after not renewing his contract.

Rojer signed a two-year contract with FC Emmen in 2010, who picked him up as a free agent. He ended his professional career in 2013.

After leaving Emmen, Rojer had spells at amateur clubs WKE, SV Babberich and SC Veluwezoom while working as a youth coach on the side.
