= Johnny de Vries =

Dutch footballer

Personal information
- Full name: Johnny de Vries
- Date of birth: 20 February 1990 (age 36)
- Place of birth: Appelscha, Netherlands
- Height: 1.79 m (5 ft 10 1/2 in)
- Position: Midfielder

Youth career
- SC Heerenveen

Senior career*
Years	Team	Apps	(Gls)
2010–2012	SC Heerenveen	0	(0)
2010–2012	→ FC Emmen (loan)	38	(1)
2012–2014	SC Cambuur	3	(1)
- * Club domestic league appearances and goals as of 19 July 2014 (UTC)

Johnny de Vries (born 20 February 1990 in Appelscha) is a Dutch professional footballer who plays as a midfielder. He formerly played for FC Emmen, on loan from SC Heerenveen and for SC Cambuur.

== Honours ==
=== Club ===
SC Cambuur

- Eerste Divisie (1): 2012–13
