= Dammyano Grootfaam =

Dutch footballer

Personal information
- Date of birth: 13 May 1991 (age 35)
- Place of birth: Paramaribo, Suriname
- Position: Right winger

Youth career
- SV TOP
- –2006: TOP Oss
- 2006–2009: NEC
- 2009–2010: NEC/FC Oss

Senior career*
Years	Team	Apps	(Gls)
2010–2012	NEC	3	(0)
2012	→ FC Oss (loan)	14	(1)
2013–2024	Real Lunet		
2024-	Advendo		
- * Club domestic league appearances and goals

Dammyano Grootfaam (born 13 May 1991) is a Dutch retired footballer who played as a right winger for Eredivisie club NEC and Eerste Divisie club FC Oss during the 2011–12 season.

He joined Advendo from fellow amateur side Real Lunet in summer 2024.
