= Qays Shayesteh =

Afghan footballer (born 1988)

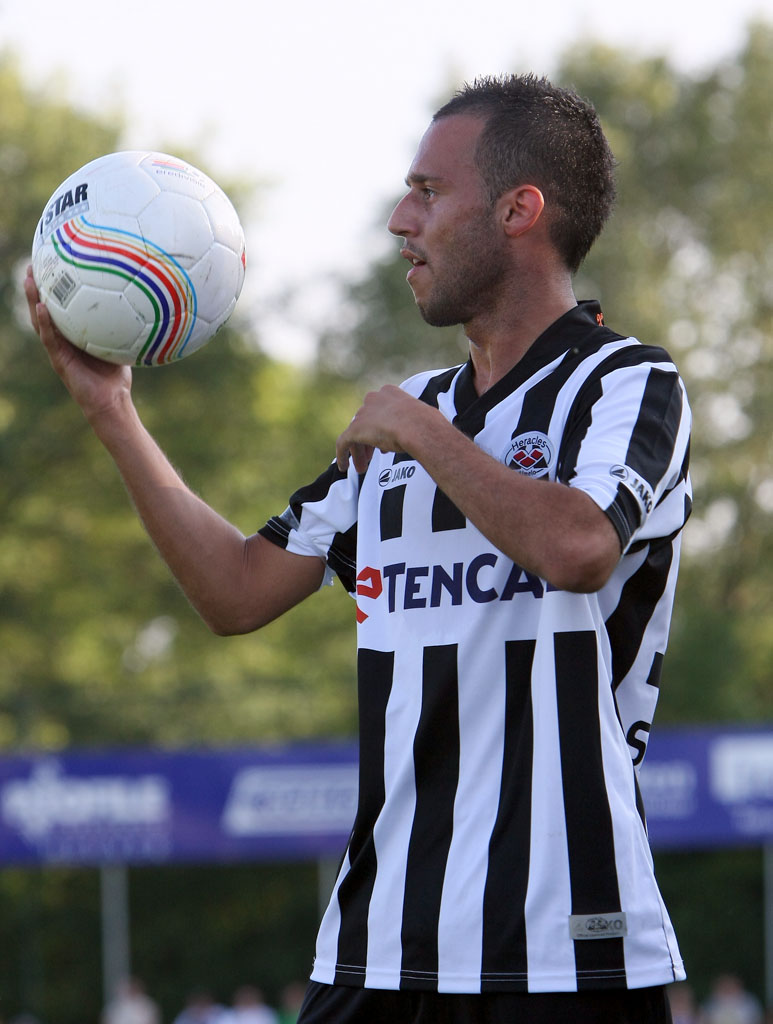
- Shayesteh with Heracles Almelo in 2009

Personal information
- Date of birth: 22 March 1988 (age 38)
- Place of birth: Kabul, Afghanistan
- Height: 1.66 m (5 ft 5 in)
- Position: Midfielder

Team information
- Current team: Tubantia Hengelo

Youth career
- Twente

Senior career*
Years	Team	Apps	(Gls)
2008–2010	Heracles Almelo	7	(0)
2010–2011	Veendam	18	(2)
2011–2012	Emmen	7	(0)
2012–2013	VV Glanerbrug		
2013–2019	DETO		
2019–2021	GVV Eilermark		
2021–	Tubantia Hengelo		

International career
2007	Netherlands U19	3	(0)
2011–2017	Afghanistan	5	(0)
- * Club domestic league appearances and goals as of 13 January

Qays Shayesteh (born 22 March 1988) is an Afghan former professional footballer who plays as a midfielder for Tubantia Hengelo. He has also played for Twente (youth club), Heracles Almelo, Veendam, Emmen, VV Glanerbrug and DETO.

== International career ==
Born in Kabul, Shayesteh is a former youth international for the Netherlands. He represented the Afghanistan national team from 2011 until 2017, making five appearances.
