= Ruud ter Heide =

Dutch footballer

Personal information
- Date of birth: 15 October 1982 (age 44)
- Place of birth: Enschede, Netherlands
- Height: 1.89 m (6 ft 2 in)
- Position: Forward

Youth career
- Eilermark

Senior career*
Years	Team	Apps	(Gls)
2001–2003	Twente	4	(0)
2003–2004	Eintracht Nordhorn	30	(24)
2004–2005	Werder Bremen II	31	(7)
2005–2008	AGOVV	99	(51)
2008–2010	Cambuur	48	(17)
2010	→ Emmen (loan)	16	(12)
2010–2013	Emmen	69	(28)
2012	→ FC Zwolle (loan)	12	(2)
2013-2016	SVZW		
2016-2017	Eilermark		
Total		308	(141)
- * Club domestic league appearances and goals

Ruud ter Heide (born 15 October 1982) is a Dutch retired footballer who played as a forward.

== Career ==
Born in Enschede, Overijssel, Ter Heide started his career with FC Twente. He made five appearances from 2001 until 2003. In the 2003–04 season, he played with German team Eintracht Nordhorn where he made 30 appearances and scored 24 goals. In the 2004–05 season, he moved to SV Werder Bremen where he scored seven goals in 31 appearances. He moved back to the Netherlands with AGOVV in 2005.

In early 2010, he was loaned by Cambuur to FC Emmen for the remainder of the season. He signed a permanent deal with the club on 4 June 2010.

After retiring as a professional, Ter Heide played for amateur sides SVZW and Eilermark from his hometown Glanerbrug where he once started playing football and already was an assistant coach. They suspended him in 2017 after an alleged feud with Eilermark's chairman.

== Personal life ==
In 2008 Ter Heide was suspended by the KNVB for racist comments he made towards Stormvogels Telstar player Geoffrey Meye.

On 5 July 2018, ter Heide was, together with his brother Frank, sentenced to 12 years in prison for stabbing two brothers, wounding one of them fatally.
