= Michalis Vakalopoulos =

Dutch-Greek footballer

Personal information
- Full name: Michalis Vakalopoulos
- Date of birth: 26 June 1990 (age 36)
- Place of birth: Leiderdorp, Netherlands
- Height: 1.87 m (6 ft 1 1/2 in)
- Position: Centre back

Youth career
- 2003-2007;: ADO Den Haag;
- 2007-2009;: PSV Eindhoven;

Senior career*
| Years | Team | Apps | (Gls) |
| 2009-2012; | Vitesse Arnhem | 2 | (0) |
| 2012-2013; | SC Veendam | 40 | (2) |
- * Club domestic league appearances and goals as of 19 August 2012 (UTC)

Michalis Vakalopoulos (born 26 June 1990 in Leiderdorp) is a Dutch-Greek professional footballer who used to play as a defender for PSV Eindhoven, Vitesse Arnhem and for SC Veendam.
