= Wouter de Vogel =

Dutch footballer

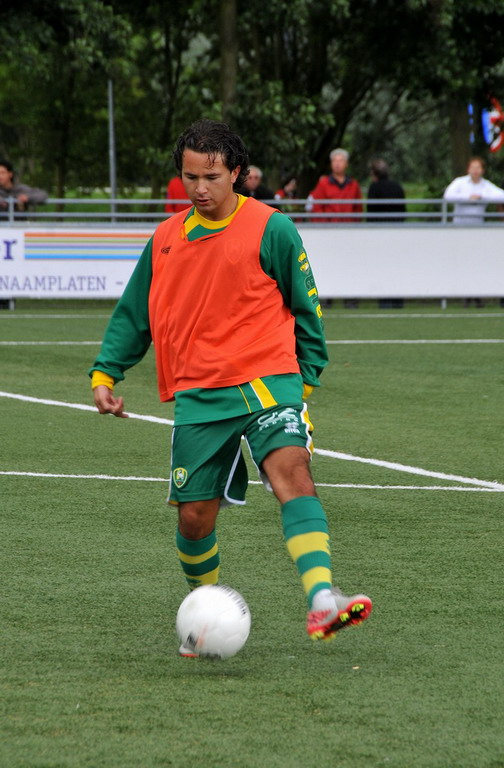
- Wouter de Vogel.

Personal information
- Full name: Wouter de Vogel
- Date of birth: 17 September 1990 (age 36)
- Place of birth: Gouda, Netherlands
- Height: 1.73 m (5 ft 8 in)
- Position: Winger

Youth career
- VV Bodegraven
- Alphense Boys
- Telstar
- AZ

Senior career*
Years	Team	Apps	(Gls)
2010–2011	AZ	0	(0)
2010–2011	→ Telstar (loan)	28	(7)
2011–2013	ADO Den Haag	1	(0)
2012	→ FC Dordrecht (loan)	16	(0)
2012–2013	→ FC Den Bosch (loan)	2	(0)
2013–2014	FC Den Bosch	7	(1)
2014–2015	Telstar	4	(0)
2015–2016	FC Oss	12	(0)
2016–2017	FC Lienden	24	(4)
2017–2018	FC Lienden	27	(4)
- * Club domestic league appearances and goals as of 8 October 2018

Wouter de Vogel (Dutch pronunciation: [ˈʋʌutər də ˈvoːɣəl]; born 17 September 1990) is a Dutch footballer who most recently played as a winger for FC Lienden. He formerly played for AZ, Telstar, ADO Den Haag, FC Dordrecht and FC Den Bosch.
