= Henny Schilder =

Dutch footballer

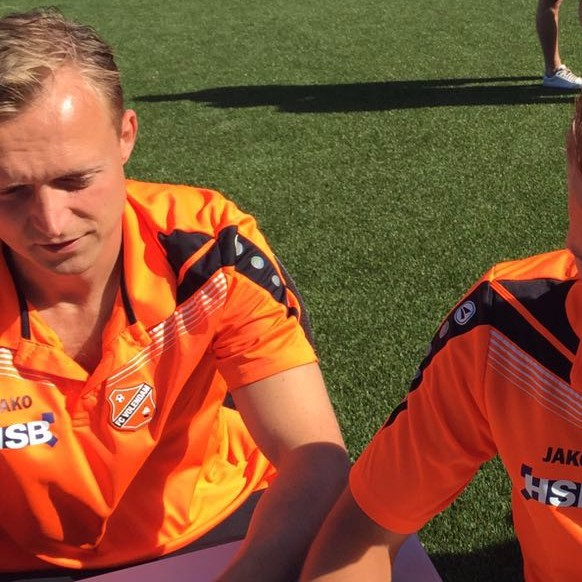

Personal information
- Date of birth: 4 September 1984 (age 42)
- Place of birth: Volendam, Netherlands
- Height: 1.90 m (6 ft 3 in)
- Position: Centre back

Youth career
- RKAV Volendam
- FC Volendam

Senior career*
Years	Team	Apps	(Gls)
2005–2018	FC Volendam	392	(10)
2018–2019	RKAV Volendam	10	(0)
- * Club domestic league appearances and goals

Henny Schilder (born 4 September 1984) is a Dutch former football player who played as a centre back.

== Career ==
Schilder started his career in the youth of RKAV Volendam. He was picked up by FC Volendam, and was added to the first team in the 2005-06 season. He made his professional debut in the Eerste Divisie on 8 September 2006, in the 3–1 lost away-match against FC Eindhoven. He came on as a substitute for Rowin van Zaanen in the 67th minute.
