= Oğuzhan Türk =

Dutch footballer and coach (born 1986)

Personal information
- Date of birth: 17 May 1986 (age 40)
- Place of birth: Kampen, Netherlands
- Height: 1.73 m (5 ft 8 in)
- Position: Midfielder

Team information
- Current team: Şanlıurfaspor (assistant)

Youth career
- –1998: DOS Kampen
- 1998–2005: SC Heerenveen

Senior career*
Years	Team	Apps	(Gls)
2005–2009	SC Heerenveen	0	(0)
2007–2009	→ Go Ahead Eagles (loan)	66	(5)
2009–2012	Cambuur	83	(15)
2012–2014	VVV-Venlo	63	(9)
2014–2015	Gaziantepspor	25	(0)
2016	Adanaspor	7	(0)
2016–2017	Emmen	29	(1)
2017–2019	Şanlıurfaspor	57	(1)
2019–2021	Bodrumspor	52	(4)
Total		382	(35)

International career
2001–2002	Netherlands U16	6	(0)
2002–2003	Netherlands U17	10	(0)
2004	Netherlands U18	1	(0)
2004–2005	Netherlands U19	7	(0)

Managerial career
- 2022–2023: Bodrum (U19 assistant)
- 2024–: Şanlıurfaspor (assistant)
- * Club domestic league appearances and goals

Oğuzhan Türk (born 17 May 1986) is a Dutch former footballer who serves as assistant manager of Şanlıurfaspor.

== Club career ==
Born in Kampen, Overijssel to Turkish parents, Türk started his career in the youth departments of amateur side DOS Kampen, and was later scouted by SC Heerenveen. He failed to break through to the first team, resulting in a loan to Go Ahead Eagles. There, Türk made his professional debut in the 2007–08 Eerste Divisie season for Go Ahead Eagles, in a 6–0 win over FC Emmen on 10 August 2007.

After playing two seasons on loan in Deventer, he was signed by SC Cambuur.

In July 2012, Türk joined VVV-Venlo on a two-year contract. After one season, the team was relegated to the Eerste Divisie. After his contract with VVV-Venlo had expired in June 2014, Türk signed a two-year deal with Gaziantepspor. On 31 December 2015, his contract was terminated by mutual consent. He then signed with Adanaspor on 30 January 2016.

On 15 August 2016, Türk returned to the Netherlands where he signed a one-year contract with FC Emmen. On 12 July 2017, he signed a two-year deal with Şanlıurfaspor. In 2019, he continued his career with Bodrumspor on a two-year deal. He left the club again in July 2021, after his contract expired.

== International career ==
Türk has been capped at Netherlands under-16 level. His first cap as a youth international was on 25 October 2001 in a 2–1 loss to Germany U16 in a Walker Crisp Tournament game at JJB Stadium in Wigan, England, coming on shortly before half-time for Nick van der Horst.

== Coaching career ==
Following his retirement from professional football, Türk began working as a youth coach. In August 2022, he was appointed as an assistant coach for the U19 team at Bodrum, where he remained until the end of the 2022–23 season.

In November 2024, he joined Şanlıurfaspor as the head coach of the club's U15 team. He held that position until April 2025, when he was promoted to the role of assistant coach for the senior team.

== Honours ==
Adanaspor

- TFF First League: 2015–16
