= Paul de Lange =

Dutch footballer

Personal information
- Full name: Paul de Lange
- Date of birth: 4 February 1981 (age 45)
- Place of birth: Beverwijk, Netherlands
- Height: 1.80 m (5 ft 11 in)
- Position: Midfielder

Team information
- Current team: Katwijk
- Number: 8

Youth career
- DEM Beverwijk
- Telstar

Senior career*
Years	Team	Apps	(Gls)
2000–2003	Telstar	125	(8)
2003–2004	SC Heerenveen	27	(1)
2005–2007	RBC Roosendaal	65	(2)
2007–2008	Veria	15	(1)
2008–2013	FC Volendam	92	(14)
2011–2012	→ Almere City (loan)	36	(1)
2013–	Katwijk	52	(0)
- * Club domestic league appearances and goals as of 11 February 2017

Paul de Lange (born 4 February 1981 in Beverwijk) is a Dutch footballer who currently plays as a midfielder for Katwijk in the Dutch Tweede Divisie.

== Career ==
De Lange started his career as a youth soccer player at local amateur club R.K. v.v. DEM Beverwijk, before making the move to the youth department of Telstar. He made his debut in professional football at age 19, on 19 August 2000 in the Eerste Divisie match against Excelsior, coming on as a 90th-minute substitute for Melvin Holwijn. The match ended in a 3–1 win for the White Lions. He was signed by SC Heerenveen in the summer of 2003, making his Eredivisie-debut on 17 August 2003, the opening day of the 2003–04 Eredivisie season, in a 0–1 away victory against FC Volendam. De Lange made a further 27 league appearances in the 2003–04 season, then joined RBC Roosendaal the following season. After three years in Roosendaal, he was picked up by Super League Greece club Veria. After 15 appearances for the Greek side, he was picked up by newly promoted Eredivisie side FC Volendam in May 2008 making 31 league appearances and scoring 5 goals in that season.

In January 2011, De Lange went to Almere City on loan for the rest of the season.
