= Malcolm Esajas =

Dutch footballer (born 1986)

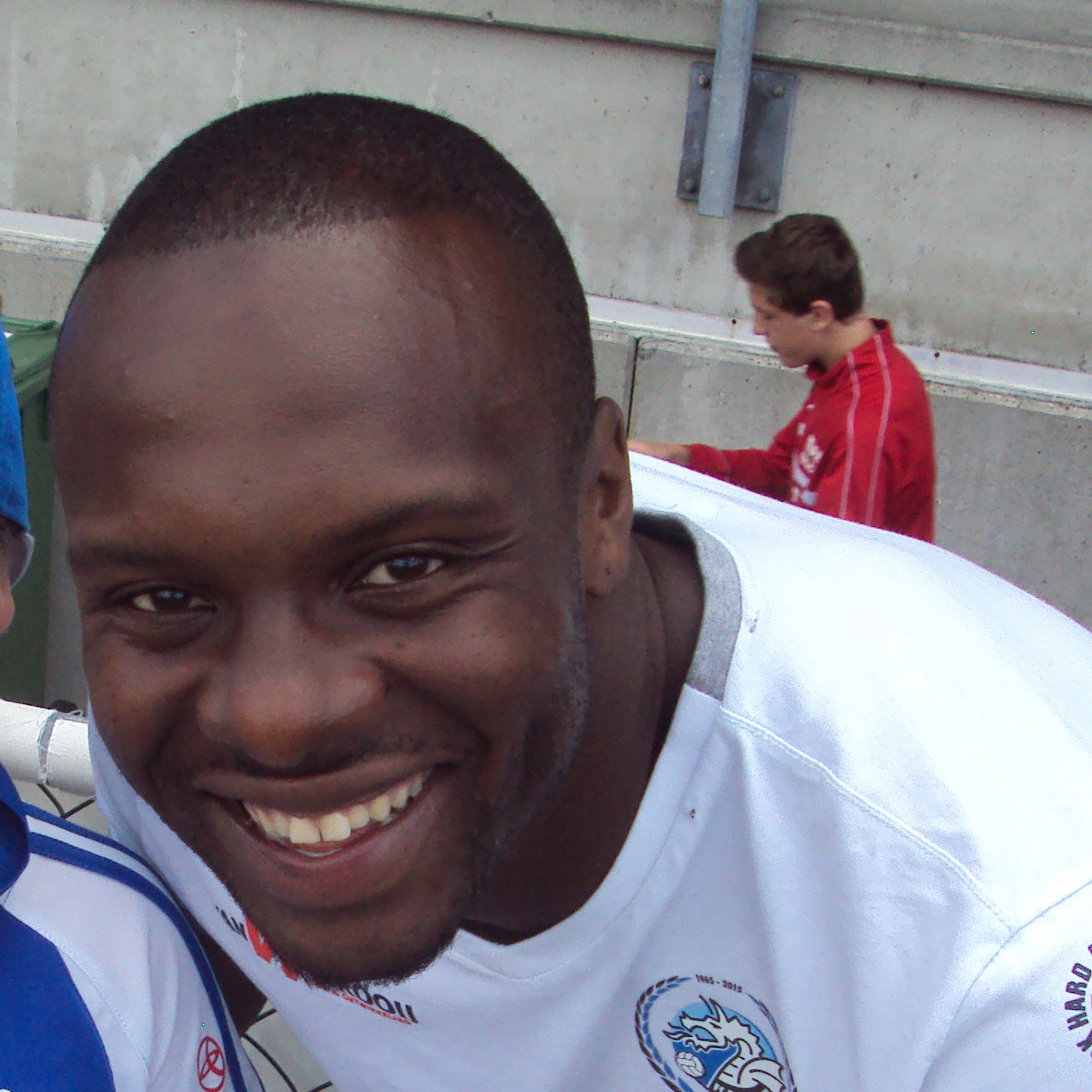
- Esajas with Den Bosch in 2015

Personal information
- Full name: Malcolm Roland Esajas
- Date of birth: 13 July 1986 (age 40)
- Place of birth: Amsterdam, Netherlands
- Height: 1.80 m (5 ft 11 in)
- Position: Winger

Youth career
- ZSGOWMS
- AFC DWS
- 2008–2009: AFC

Senior career*
Years	Team	Apps	(Gls)
2009–2013	MVV	118	(28)
2013–2015	ADO Den Haag	2	(0)
2014–2015	→ RKC Waalwijk (loan)	28	(5)
2015–2016	Den Bosch	26	(2)
2017–2018	AFC	15	(3)
2018–2023	JOS	48	(7)
Total		237	(45)
- * Club domestic league appearances and goals

Malcolm Esajas (born 13 July 1986) is a Dutch former professional footballer who plays as a winger.

== Club career ==
Esajas formerly played for MVV Maastricht and ADO Den Haag, who loaned him to RKC Waalwijk in the 2014-15 season. He joined FC Den Bosch in summer 2015, only to be deemed surplus to requirements a year later.

In summer 2017 Esajas returned to former club AFC after spending a year without a club.
