= De Geusselt =

Stadium in Maastricht, Netherlands

Stadion De Geusselt
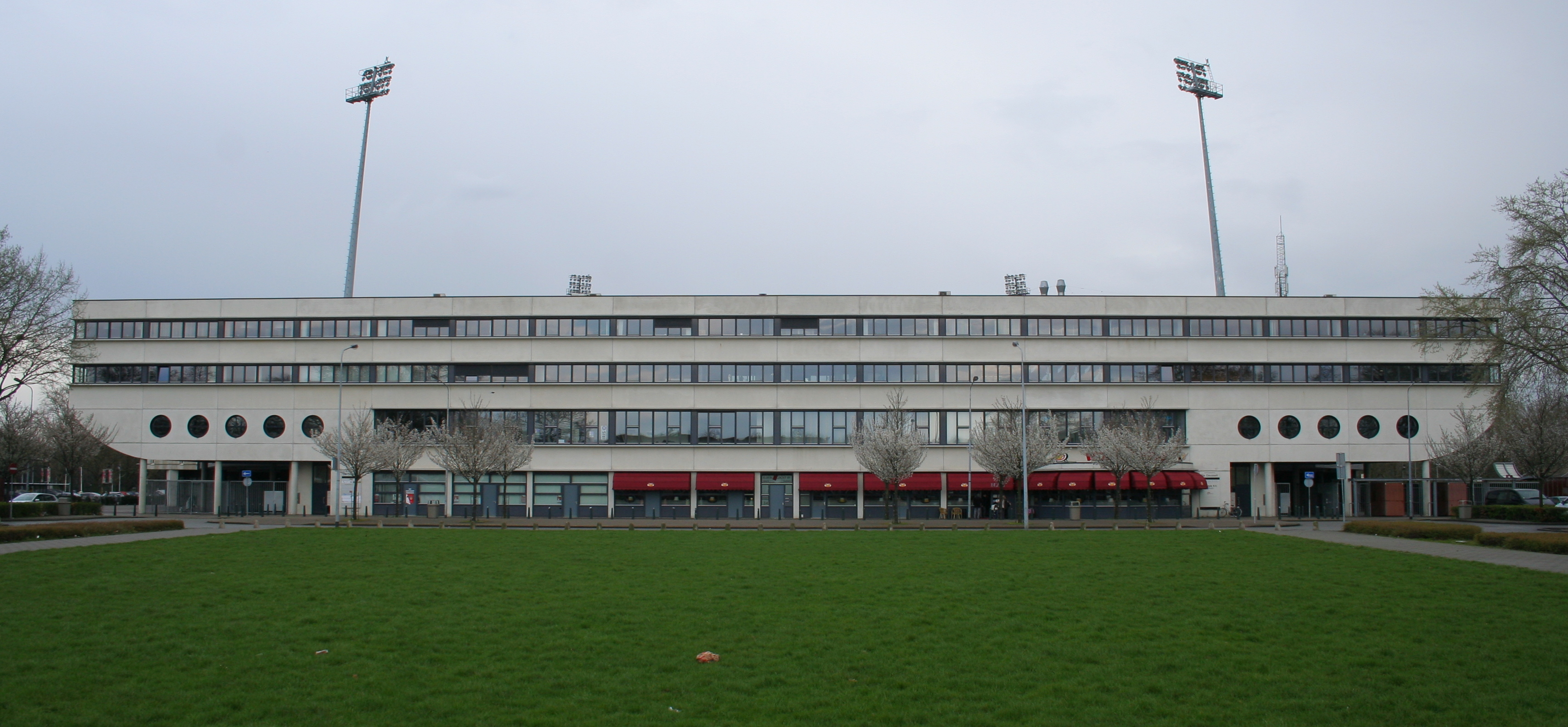
- Interactive map of Stadion De Geusselt
- Location: Maastricht, Netherlands
- Coordinates: 50°51′27″N 5°43′04″E
- Capacity: 10,000
- Surface: Artificial Turf
- Field size: 105 × 68 m

Construction
- Opened: 1961

Tenant
- MVV (1961–present)

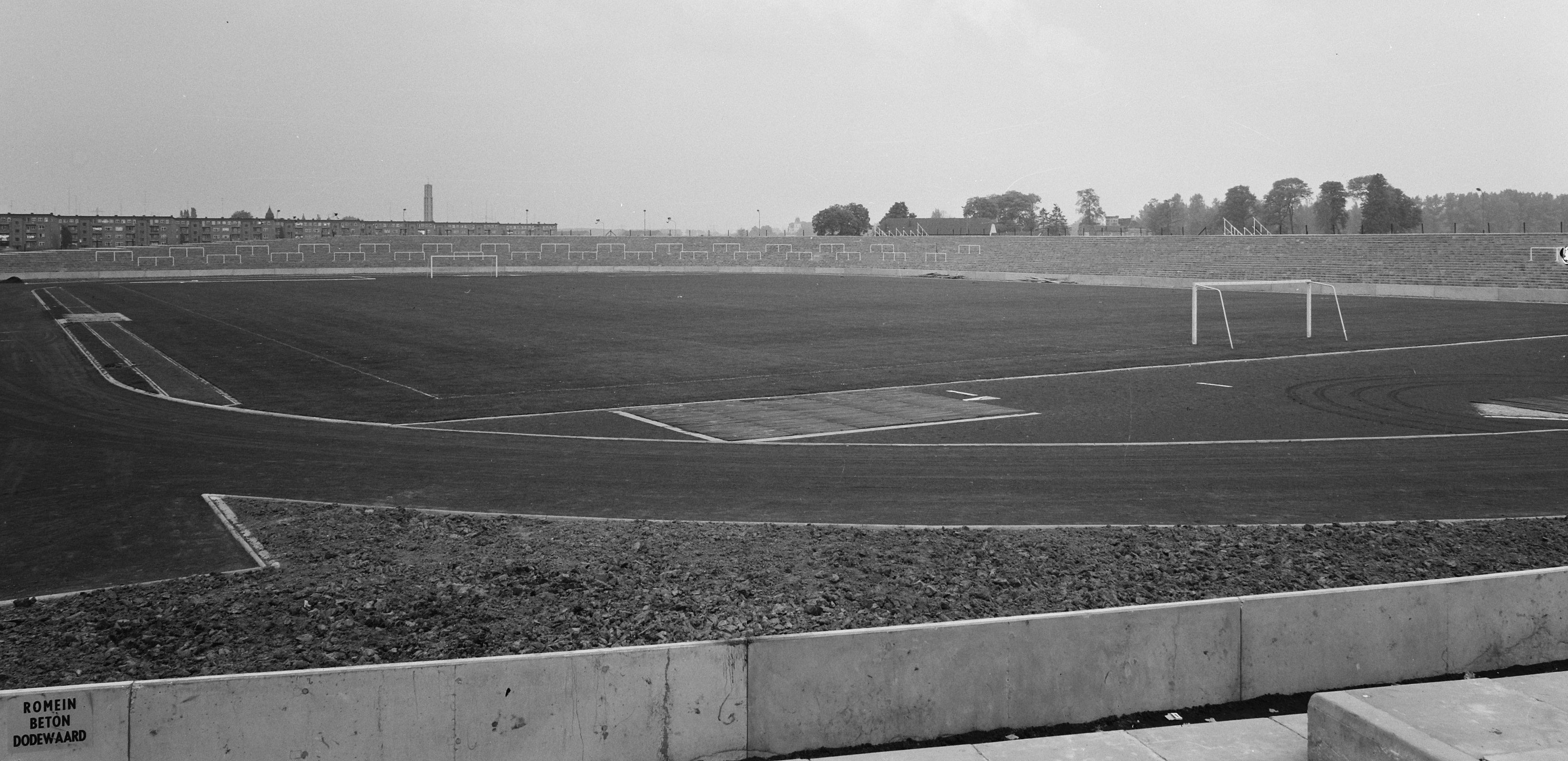
The home of MVV in 1961.

Stadion de Geusselt (Dutch pronunciation: [də ˈɣøːsəlt]) is a multi-use stadium in Maastricht, Netherlands. It is currently used mostly for football matches and is the home stadium of MVV Maastricht. The stadium is able to hold 10,000 people and was built in 1961.

The pitch is artificial turf.

== History ==
The first game played at the stadium was a 2-0 win for MVV Maastricht over Willem II in 1961. It was renovated in 1987.

== See also ==
- List of football stadiums in the Netherlands
- Lists of stadiums
