= Michiel Hemmen =

Dutch footballer

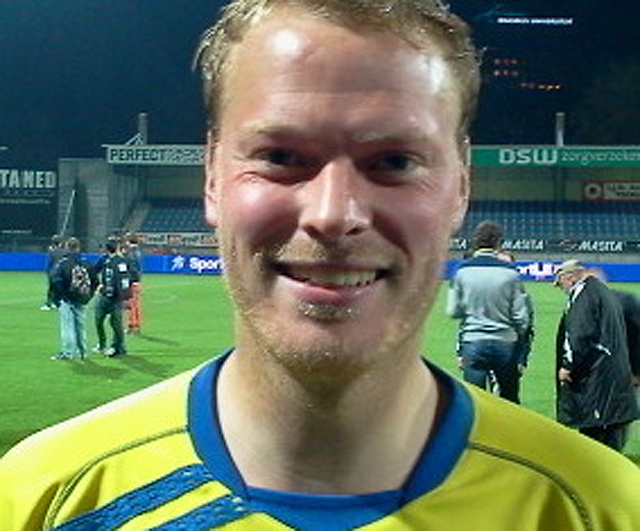

Personal information
- Full name: Michiel Hemmen
- Date of birth: 28 June 1987 (age 39)
- Place of birth: Zaanstad, Netherlands
- Height: 1.93 m (6 ft 4 in)
- Position: Forward

Youth career
- KFC
- Volendam

Senior career*
Years	Team	Apps	(Gls)
2005–2008	Volendam	30	(5)
2008–2010	Veendam	48	(13)
2010–2011	AGOVV	46	(23)
2012	Westerlo	3	(0)
2012–2015	Cambuur	63	(27)
2015	Häcken	7	(2)
2016	Excelsior	4	(0)
2016–2017	Cambuur	10	(0)
2017	Emmen	12	(4)
2018–2019	Lienden	12	(4)
2019–2020	Altona Magic	9	(6)
2020	Rijnsburgse Boys	2	(0)
2021	KFC	6	(2)
Total		252	(86)
- * Club domestic league appearances and goals

Michiel Hemmen (born 28 June 1987) is a Dutch retired footballer who played as a forward. He formerly played for FC Volendam, AGOVV, whom he joined for free after SC Veendam went bankrupt, Westerlo, SC Cambuur, BK Häcken, Excelsior and Altona Magic.

== Career ==
Hemmen made his debut for SC Cambuur on 12 August 2012, on which occasion he scored a goal in the 1st minute. In the 2012–2013 season Hemmen scored 17 goals, with which he made a substantial contribution to the team's championship and promotion to the Dutch Eredivisie. In 2013 Hemmen signed a contract extension with SC Cambuur, that will keep him in Leeuwarden until the summer of 2015. He returned to the club after unsuccessful stints in Sweden and with Excelsior. He had a spell at Emmen in 2017.

Hemmen signed for FC Lienden on 23 September 2018. On 10 February 2019, Hemmen moved to Australian club Altona Magic SC for the 2019 season, the club announced on Facebook.

In June 2020, Hemmen returned to the Netherlands where he signed with Tweede Divisie club Rijnsburgse Boys. After only two appearances for the club, he left in February 2021 to return to his childhood club KFC.

== Personal life ==
Hemmen works as an account manager for SportBase Benelux Business.

== Honours ==
=== Club ===
Cambuur

- Eerste Divisie (1): 2012–13
