= Moussa Kalisse =

Dutch footballer

Personal information
- Full name: Moussa Kalisse
- Date of birth: 18 May 1983 (age 43)
- Place of birth: Bodegraven, Netherlands
- Height: 1.74 m (5 ft 9 in)
- Position: Winger

Youth career
- vv Bodegraven
- ARC
- Sparta Rotterdam

Senior career*
Years	Team	Apps	(Gls)
2003–2005	Sparta Rotterdam	40	(6)
2005–2011	FC Dordrecht	172	(45)
2011	FCM Târgu Mureş	3	(0)
2011–2014	Excelsior	21	(0)
2012–2013	→ FC Dordrecht (loan)	23	(5)
- * Club domestic league appearances and goals as of 18 May 2014 (UTC) ‡ National team caps and goals as of 20:35, 10 October 2009 (UTC)

Moussa Kalisse (born 18 May 1983 in Bodegraven) is a Dutch footballer who plays as a striker. He is currently without a club. He formerly played for Sparta Rotterdam, FC Dordrecht, Excelsior and FCM Târgu Mureş.
