= Melvin Platje =

Dutch footballer (born 1988)

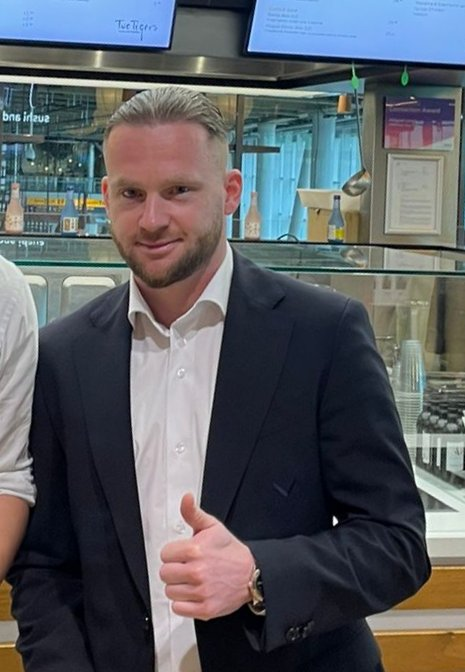

Personal information
- Full name: Antonius Johannes Melvin Platje
- Date of birth: 16 December 1988 (age 37)
- Place of birth: Naarden, Netherlands
- Height: 1.77 m (5 ft 10 in)
- Position: Forward

Team information
- Current team: AFC
- Number: 7

Youth career
- SDO Bussum
- –2005: Omniworld
- 2005–2006: Huizen
- 2006–2007: Volendam

Senior career*
Years	Team	Apps	(Gls)
2007–2011	Volendam	100	(43)
2011–2013	NEC	63	(15)
2013–2014	Neftchi Baku	14	(1)
2014	→ Kalmar (loan)	4	(0)
2014–2015	VVV-Venlo	33	(15)
2015–2016	Brest	12	(1)
2016–2017	Hansa Rostock	25	(1)
2017	Lommel United	8	(2)
2017–2018	Telstar	35	(14)
2018–2022	Bali United	59	(24)
2021	→ De Graafschap (loan)	12	(1)
2022	Bhayangkara	13	(6)
2022–2025	AFC	79	(16)
- * Club domestic league appearances and goals as of 17 December 2025

Melvin Platje (Dutch pronunciation: [ˈmɛlvɪm ˈplɑtɕə]; (Note: In isolation, Melvin is pronounced [ˈmɛlvɪn].) born 16 December 1988) is a former Dutch professional footballer who played as a forward.

== Career ==
=== Early career ===
Before joining FC Volendam, Platje played in the youth departments of FC Omniworld and SV Huizen. He later moved to the FC Volendam youth system, and Platje joined the professional ranks at the club in the summer of 2007. Platje made his first team debut on 24 August 2007, when he came on as a 68th-minute substitute for Jack Tuyp in an Eerste Divisie match against FC Zwolle. In the 2008–09 Eredivisie season, Platje became known as a super sub for coming on as a substitute and scoring many vital goals in the minutes he played. In his last season with Volendam in the Eerste Divisie, Platje recorded 4 appearances and netted 5 goals. During the 2011 summer transfer window, Platje was transferred from Volendam to NEC on a free transfer. He made his debut for the club on 6 August 2011, starting in their draw 2–2 draw with Heerenveen. In his second game for the club, Platje scored a nine-minute second-half brace against Excelsior to give his club a 2–0 win. The win moved NEC up to fifth spot in the Eredivisie league table.

=== Neftchi Baku ===
In July 2013, Platje signed a lucrative one-year contract with Neftchi Baku in the Azerbaijan Premier League, but after failing to make an impact in Azerbaijan, Platje moved to Kalmar on loan for the remainder of his contract.

=== VVV Venlo ===
On 3 September, Platje signed a deal with Dutch Eerste Divisie side VVV-Venlo.

=== Lommel United ===
On 14 February 2017 he joined Belgian Second division club Lommel United till the end of the season.

=== Bali United ===
On 29 June 2018, he joined Indonesian Liga 1 club, Bali United. Platje made his Bali United debut on 11 July 2018 in a Liga 1 match against PSM Makassar in a 2–0 home win. He scored his first league goal on 17 July 2018. It was the first goal in a 0–2 victory against Persija Jakarta in the Liga 1. Platje was chosen as the 2019 Liga 1 best player in September. One of the roles of this special appearance was arguably done by Platje. he was able to get involved in three of the six goals scored by the players of Bali United this September. He scored two goals and one assist for Tridatu Warriors. On 13 August, he scored his first international brace in a temporary score 0–2 over Singapore Premier League club Tampines Rovers, after in the 43rd minute Tampines's player Boris Kopitovic made his goal. Until the first half is over, score 1–2. Until the match is over. Bali United won 3–5 over Tampines Rovers through extra time and qualify for the preliminary round 2 in the 2020 AFC Champions League and will face Melbourne Victory on 21 January 2020.

== Career statistics ==
As of Match played 19 July 2014

Club performance			League		Cup		Continental		Other (Note: Includes other competitive competitions, including the Azerbaijan Supercup.)		Total	
Season	Club	League	Apps	Goals	Apps	Goals	Apps	Goals	Apps	Goals	Apps	Goals
2007–08	Volendam	Eerste Divisie	11	1			-		-		34	8
2008–09	Volendam	Eredivisie	32	7	3	3	-		-		35	10
2009–10	Volendam	Eerste Divisie	24	14	1	1	-		-		25	15
2010–11	Volendam	Eerste Divisie	37	26	3	0	-		-		40	8
2011–12	NEC	Eredivisie	30	6	4	2	-		-		34	8
2012–13	NEC	Eredivisie	33	9	1	0	-		-		34	9
2013–14	Neftchi Baku	APL	14	1	2	0	2	0	1	0	19	1
2014	Kalmar (Loan)	Allsvenskan	4	0	0	0	0	0	-		4	0
Total	Netherlands		163	58	12	6	-	-	-	-	175	64
Total	Azerbaijan		14	1	2	0	2	0	1	0	19	1
Total	Sweden		4	0	0	0	0	0	0	0	4	0
Total			181	59	14	6	2	0	1	0	198	65

== Honours ==
=== Club ===
FC Volendam

- Eerste Divisie: 2007–08

Hansa Rostock

- Mecklenburg-Vorpommern Cup: 2015–16

Bali United

- Liga 1: 2019
