= Danny Schreurs =

Dutch footballer (born 1987)

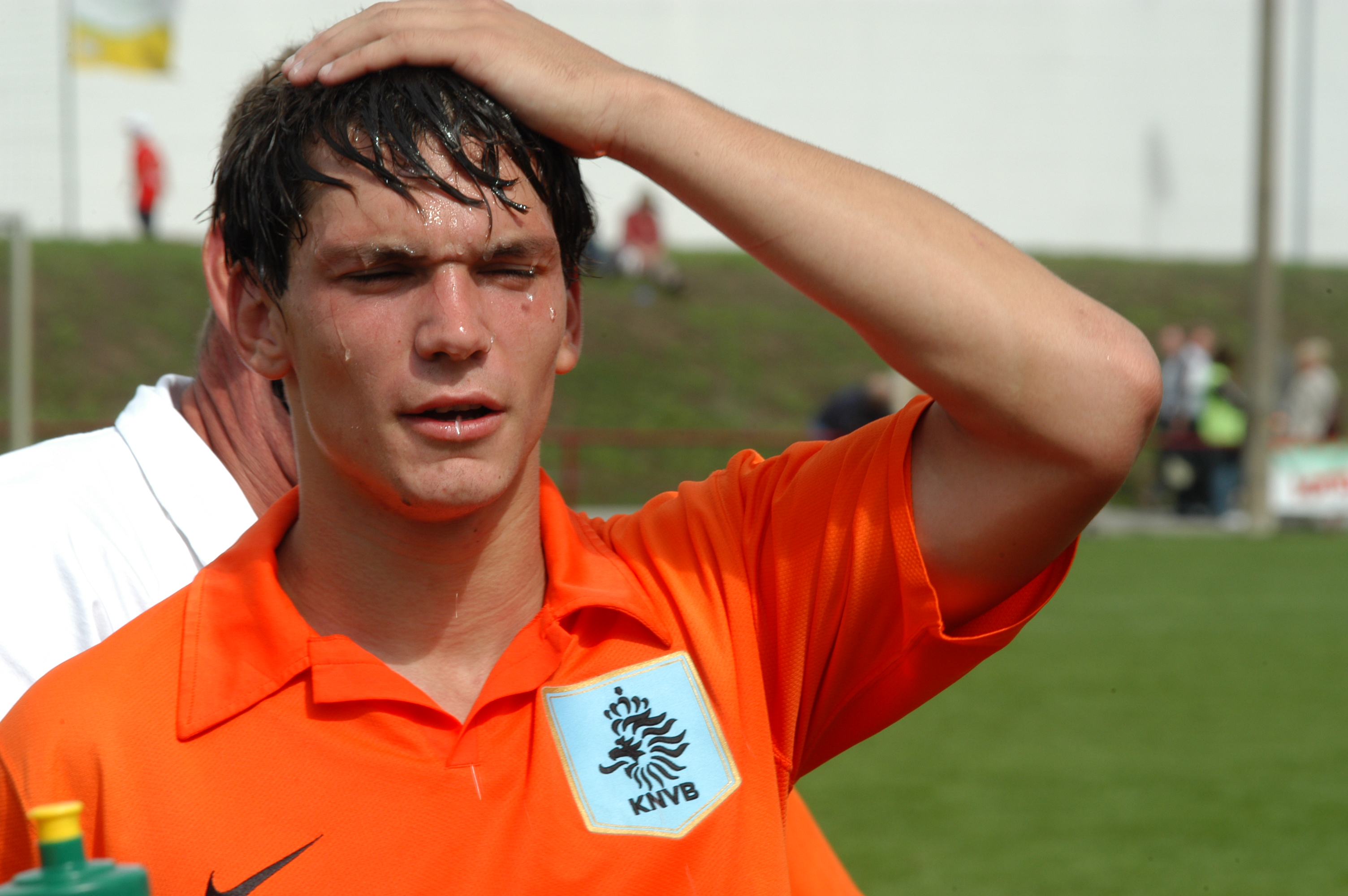
- Schreurs in 2006

Personal information
- Date of birth: 28 August 1987 (age 39)
- Place of birth: Maastricht, Netherlands
- Height: 1.75 m (5 ft 9 in)
- Position: Striker

Youth career
- MVV

Senior career*
Years	Team	Apps	(Gls)
2006–2009	Fortuna Sittard	55	(14)
2009–2011	Zwolle	62	(25)
2011–2012	Willem II	16	(5)
2012	→ Fortuna Sittard (loan)	14	(9)
2012–2014	MVV	48	(16)
2014–2015	Roda JC	18	(4)
2015	Leiknir Reykjavík	7	(0)
2016	Bocholt	17	(4)
2016–2017	Sporting Hasselt	18	(2)
2017–2021	RKSV Heer		
- * Club domestic league appearances and goals

Danny Schreurs (born 28 August 1987) is a Dutch former professional footballer who played as a forward.

== Club career ==
Schreurs started his career in the youth of MVV from his hometown Maastricht, but did not manage to break through to the first team. Afterwards, he was signed by Fortuna Sittard, where he made his professional debut in 2006. There he played together with Ruud Boymans on the two striker positions.

In June 2009, Schreurs signed a two-year contract with FC Zwolle. His first season in Zwolle was successful, scoring 9 goals in 29 league matches.

In June 2011, Schreurs signed a two-year contract with Willem II., 18 June 2011, voetbalprimeur.nl. After only half a year, Schreurs was sent on loan to his former team Fortuna Sittard, where he scored 9 times in 13 matches.

In July 2012, his contract was terminated by Willem II and Schreurs signed with MVV Maastricht. He was released in June 2014.

In August 2014, Schreurs made the remarkable move to MVV's biggest rival Roda JC Kerkrade.

Schreurs signed with Icelandic club Leiknir Reykjavík in July 2015. For the 2016–17 season, Schreurs played for the Sporting Hasselt, playing in the Belgian Third Division, who signed him from Bocholter VV. In 2017, he returned to the Netherlands to play for lower-tier amateur club RKSV Heer. He left the club in 2021, after his son Senn (b. 2012) moved from Roda JC's academy to PSV, which meant that Schreurs could not be present at Heer's team practices.

== Style of play ==
He has by commentators been dubbed as "Messi Schreurs", because of his pace, good ball control and ability to score goals.

== Personal life ==
In 2004, he represented the Dutch ID team (intellectual disability, players with an IQ below 75) at the World Championship, winning the title. In one of the games he scored a record 22 goals.
