= Stadion Krommedijk =

Football stadium in Dordrecht, Netherlands

De Krommedijk Matchoholic Stadion
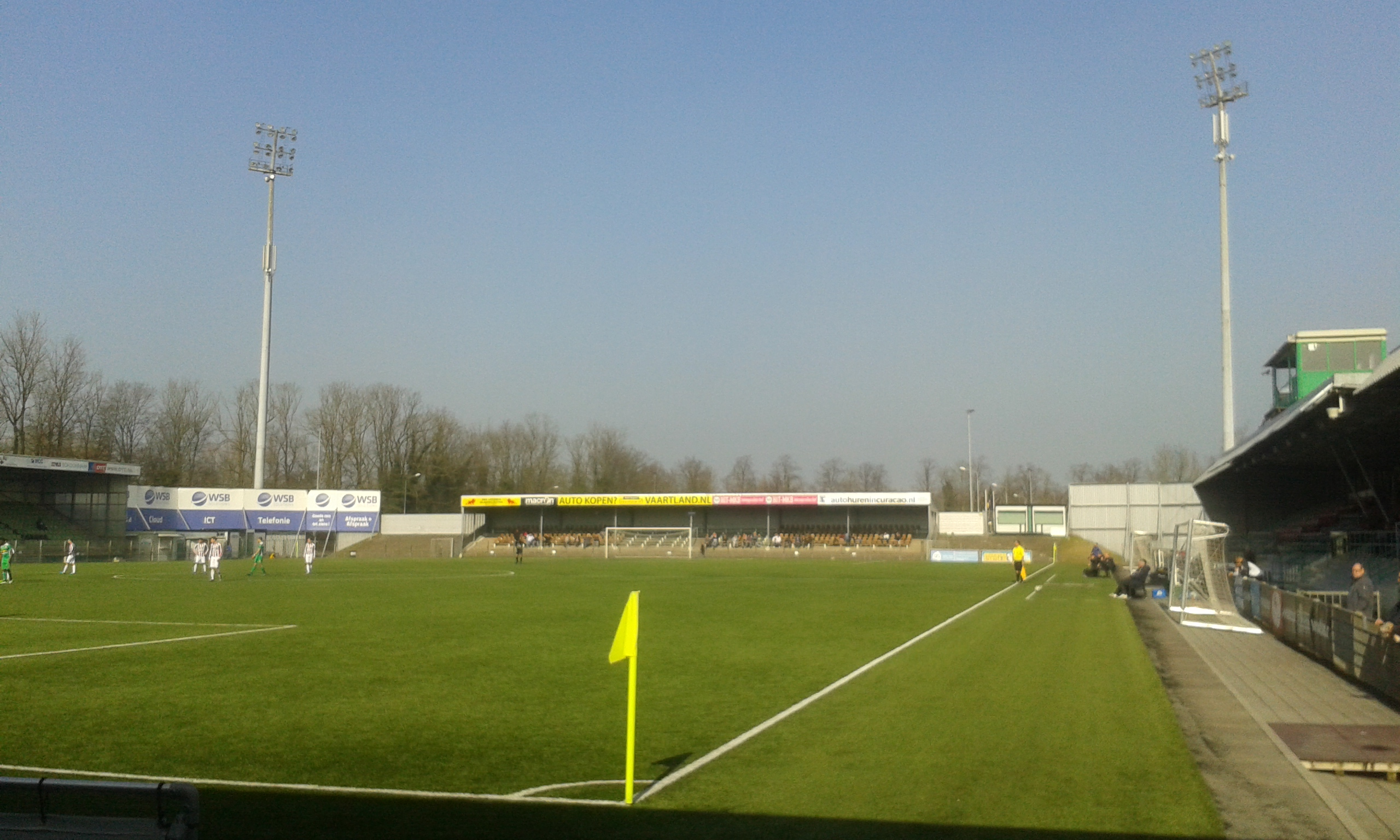
- Inside the stadium
- Interactive map of De Krommedijk; Matchoholic Stadion
- Full name: Matchoholic Stadion
- Former names: De Krommedijk (1948–present); GN Bouw Stadion (1999–2014); Riwal Hoogwerkers Stadion (2014–2022); Matchoholic Stadion (2022–present)
- Location: Dordrecht, South Holland
- Coordinates: 51°48′9″N 4°41′21″E
- Owner: FC Dordrecht
- Capacity: 4,100
- Surface: Natural grass
- Field size: 105 by 68 metres (114.8 yd × 74.4 yd)

Construction
- Opened: 1948
- Renovated: 1983, 1986, 1998

Tenant
- FC Dordrecht (1948–present)

The Stadion Krommedijk (known as the Matchoholic Stadion for sponsorship reasons) is a multi-purpose all-seater stadium in Dordrecht, South Holland, Netherlands. It is currently mostly used for football matches and is the home stadium of FC Dordrecht. The stadium is able to hold 4,100 spectators, and was built in 1948. Formerly the stadium has been known as De Krommedijk [də ˈkrɔmədɛik], GN Bouw Stadion, and Riwal Hoogwerkers Stadion.

== History ==
The stadium in Dordrecht was inaugurated in 1948 as Stadion Krommedijk and the business club of the stadium, which was formerly the clubhouse, was constructed in 1958. Since then, FC Dordrecht – at that time still called D.F.C. – has played in the facility. The rest of the stands followed some years after. In 1983 and 1986, the club won promotion to the Eredivisie. A new stand with terracing was built for the first promotion. Three years later, the stadium was renovated for the top division and a new seating area was built. At that time, the club also became the owner of the stadium.

In 1998, the complete renovation of the stadium was completed. The old stands were demolished and rebuilt. The stadium in Dordrecht opened on 25 September 1998 after three years of planning and construction, and was named GN Bouw Stadion after the Dutch construction company GN Bouw. Before the renovation, the stadium held 9,000 spectators. Today, the stadium offers a capacity of 4,100 seats.

In 2006, FC Dordrecht indicated two possible locations for a new stadium. One along the A16 motorway combined with a Van der Valk hotel, the other near the Merwede Bridge. In the end, neither location became the location for the new stadium, and the location of the greenhouse complex on the provincial road became the possible location. In those plans, the old stadium would have to make way for housing.

In May 2014, the renaming of the stadium was announced. The company Riwal Hoogwerkers BV, who rent and sell lifts, became the main sponsor.
