= 2010–11 ADO Den Haag season =

ADO Den Haag
2010–11 season
- Chairman: Mark van der Kallen
- Manager: John van den Brom
- Ground: Kyocera Stadion (Capacity: 15,000)
- Eredivisie: 7th
- KNVB Cup: Fourth round
- Top goalscorer: League: Bulykin (21); All: Bulykin (22)
Home colours	Away colours

== Players ==
=== Squad information ===
N	Pos.	Nat.	Name	Age	EU	Since	App	Goals	Ends	Transfer fee	Notes
1	GK	(Netherlands)	Coutinho	44	EU	2008	35	0	2012	Free	
2	DF	(Morocco)	Ammi	45	EU	2008	70	0	2011	€400,000	
3	DF	(Germany)	Kum	41	EU	2005	116	3	2012	Youth system	
4	DF	(Belgium)	Derijck	39	EU	2008	71	8	2012	Undisclosed	
5	MF	(Netherlands)	Bosschaart (captain)	46	EU	2007	57	0	2011	Free	
6	MF	(Serbia)	Ranković	48	EU	2005	107	6	2011	€350,000	
7	MF	(Netherlands)	Toornstra	37	EU	2009	50	3	2013	Free	
8	MF	(Netherlands)	Buijs	44	EU	2008	61	9	2011	Undisclosed	
9	MF	(Netherlands)	Immers	40	EU	2007	112	17	2014	Youth system	
11	FW	(Netherlands)	Verhoek	40	EU	2004	156	25	2012	Youth system	
12	MF	(Slovenia)	Radosavljević	47	Non-EU	2010	29	3	2013	Free	
13	ST	(Netherlands)	Ignacio	39	EU	2009	6	0	2011	Youth system	
14	DF	(Netherlands)	Leeuwin	39	EU	2010	27	0	2012	Undisclosed	
15	DF	(Netherlands)	M. Piqué	46	EU	2008	37	0	2011	Free	
16	DF	(Netherlands)	Supusepa	37	EU	2010	3	0	2012	Free	
17	DF	(Netherlands)	v. Hese	37	EU	2008	30	0	2011	Youth system	currently on loan at FC Dordrecht
18	MF	(Netherlands)	Resodihardjo	39	EU	2008	23	1	2011	Free	currently on loan at Almere City FC
19	ST	(Russia)	Bulykin	46	Non-EU	2010	28	19	2011	Undisclosed	on loan from Anderlecht
20	FW	(Netherlands)	Hulst	40	EU	2008	12	1	2011	Free	currently on loan at FC Dordrecht
21	DF	(Netherlands)	L. Piqué	36	EU	2009	11	0	2011	Free	
22	GK	(Netherlands)	Zwinkels	43	EU	2005	71	0	2012	Youth system	
23	GK	(Germany)	Pellatz	40	EU	2010	0	0	2011	Free	currently on loan at Excelsior
24	DF	(Turkey)	Köksal	36	EU	2009	1	0	2011	Youth system	
25	FW	(Netherlands)	Achterberg	36	EU	2010	2	0	2011	Youth system	
26	MF	(Netherlands)	Gielisse	36	EU	2009	3	0	2011	Youth system	
27	GK	(Netherlands)	Brouwer	36	EU	2011	3	1	2012	Free	
28	FW	(Slovakia)	Kubík	37	Non-EU	2010	26	8	2011	Free	on loan from AS Trenčín
29	DF	(Netherlands)	Tillema	37	EU	2008	4	0	2011	Youth system	
30	GK	(Netherlands)	Boks	35	EU	2010	0	0	2011	Youth system	
31	DF	(Netherlands)	Visser	37	EU	2010	18	1	2011	Youth system	
34	DF	(Belgium)	N'Toko	38	EU	2011	4	0	2013	Free	
36	FW	(Netherlands)	Vicento	35	EU	2009	31	4	2012	Youth system	
47	FW	(Netherlands)	Antonia	35	EU	2010	3	0	2011	Free	currently on loan at Go Ahead Eagles

- Last updated: 13 February 2011
- Ordered by starting 11, then appearances, then games started.

== Transfers ==
=== Summer transfer window ===
In: Note: Flags indicate national team as defined under FIFA eligibility rules; some limited exceptions apply. Players may hold more than one non-FIFA nationality.

No.	Pos.	Nation	Player
12	MF	SLO	Aleksandar Radosavljević (from (Greece) Larissa)
14	DF	NED	Ramon Leeuwin (from AGOVV)
16	DF	NED	Christian Supusepa (from Jong Ajax)
19	FW	RUS	Dmitry Bulykin (on loan from (Belgium) Anderlecht)
28	FW	SVK	František Kubík (from (Slovakia) AS Trenčín)

Out: Note: Flags indicate national team as defined under FIFA eligibility rules; some limited exceptions apply. Players may hold more than one non-FIFA nationality.

No.	Pos.	Nation	Player
7	MF	FRA	Karim Soltani (to (Greece) Iraklis)
9	FW	MNE	Bogdan Milić (to (Russia) Krylia Sovetov Samara)
10	MF	NED	Richard Knopper (to (Indonesia) PSM Makassar)
13	FW	ANT	Raily Ignacio (on loan to FC Dordrecht)
14	MF	NED	Kees Luijckx (to NAC Breda, was on loan from AZ)
16	GK	NED	Barry Ditewig (to Achilles '29)
17	MF	NED	Yuri Cornelisse (released)
19	FW	EST	Andres Oper (released)
20	DF	SVK	Csaba Horváth (to (Poland) Zagłębie Lubin)
23	MF	NED	Mike de Geer (to HBS)
40	MF	NED	Levi Schwiebbe (to AGOVV)
--	DF	NED	Tom Beugelsdijk (on loan to FC Dordrecht)
--	FW	NED	Berry Powel (to (Spain) Gimnàstic, was on loan to De Graafschap)
--	FW	BEL	Fabio Caracciolo (to Fortuna Sittard, was on loan to FC Den Bosch)

=== Winter transfer window ===
In: Note: Flags indicate national team as defined under FIFA eligibility rules; some limited exceptions apply. Players may hold more than one non-FIFA nationality.

No.	Pos.	Nation	Player
13	FW	ANT	Raily Ignacio (loan return from FC Dordrecht)
27	FW	NED	Jordy Brouwer (from (England) Liverpool)
34	DF	BEL	Chiró N'Toko (free agent)

Out: Note: Flags indicate national team as defined under FIFA eligibility rules; some limited exceptions apply. Players may hold more than one non-FIFA nationality.

No.	Pos.	Nation	Player
10	MF	NED	Ricky van den Bergh (to Sparta Rotterdam)
17	DF	NED	Kai van Hese (on loan to FC Dordrecht)
18	MF	NED	Leroy Resodihardjo (on loan to Almere City)
20	FW	NED	Santy Hulst (on loan to FC Dordrecht)
23	GK	GER	Nico Pellatz (on loan to Excelsior)
47	FW	NED	Jarchinio Antonia (on loan to Go Ahead Eagles)

== Squad stats ==
				Total			Eredivisie		KNVB Cup	
No.	Pos.	Nat.	Name	Sts	App	Gls	App	Gls	App	Gls
1	GK	(Netherlands)	Coutinho	32	32		30		2	
2	DF	(Morocco)	Ammi	18	20		19		1	
3	DF	(Germany)	Kum	25	27		26		1	
4	DF	(Belgium)	Derijck	32	32	3	30	3	2	
5	MF	(Netherlands)	Bosschaart	19	19		18		1	
6	MF	(Serbia)	Ranković		3		3			
7	MF	(Netherlands)	Toornstra	33	33	3	31	3	2	
8	MF	(Netherlands)	Buijs	6	14	2	14	2		
9	MF	(Netherlands)	Immers	29	29	9	27	7	2	2
11	FW	(Netherlands)	Verhoek	31	31	7	29	7	2	
13	MF	(Slovenia)	Radosavljević	27	28	3	27	3	1	
13	ST	(Netherlands)	Ignacio		1		1			
14	DF	(Netherlands)	Leeuwin	26	29		27		2	
15	DF	(Netherlands)	M. Piqué	13	14		13		1	
16	DF	(Netherlands)	Supusepa	1	3		3			
19	ST	(Russia)	Bulykin	25	29	20	28	19	1	1
21	DF	(Netherlands)	L. Piqué							
22	GK	(Netherlands)	Zwinkels	1	1		1			
24	MF	(Turkey)	Köksal		1		1			
25	FW	(Netherlands)	Achterberg		2		2			
26	MF	(Netherlands)	Gielisse		4		4			
27	ST	(Netherlands)	Brouwer		2		2			
28	FW	(Slovakia)	Kubik	26	26	8	25	8	1	
29	MF	(Netherlands)	Tillema							
30	GK	(Netherlands)	Boks							
31	MF	(Netherlands)	Kevin Visser	3	17	1	17	1		
34	DF	(Belgium)	N'Toko	1	4		4			
36	FW	(Netherlands)	Vicento	5	18	2	17	2	1	

Last updated: 10 February 2011
Ordered by starting 11, then appearances, then games started
0 shown as blank

=== Disciplinary record ===
N	Pos.	Nat.	Name	Yellow card	Second yellow card	Red card	Notes
11	FW	(Netherlands)	Verhoek	7	0	0	
3	MF	(Germany)	Kum	4	1	0	
28	FW	(Slovakia)	Kubík	6	0	0	
4	DF	(Belgium)	Derijck	6	0	0	
14	DF	(Netherlands)	Leeuwin	5	0	0	
36	FW	(Netherlands)	Vicento	2	1	0	
2	DF	(Morocco)	Ammi	3	0	0	
9	MF	(Netherlands)	Immers	3	0	0	
7	MF	(Netherlands)	Toornstra	3	0	0	
5	MF	(Netherlands)	Bosschaart	3	0	0	
12	MF	(Slovenia)	Radosavljević	3	0	0	
1	GK	(Netherlands)	Coutinho	2	0	0	
15	DF	(Netherlands)	M. Piqué	1	0	0	

Last updated: 5 February 2011
Source: Match reports in Competitive matches
Only competitive matches
(yellow card) = Number of bookings; (second yellow card) = Number of sending offs after a second yellow card; (red card) = Number of sending offs by a direct red card.

== Matches ==
=== Competitive ===
==== Eredivisie ====
8 August 2010 1	Vitesse	3–1	ADO Den Haag	Arnhem
14:30	Pluim 46'; Nilsson 57' (pen.), 71' (pen.)		15' Immers	Stadium: GelreDome; Attendance: 13,400; Referee: Reinold Wiedemeijer

15 August 2010 2	ADO Den Haag	1–3	Roda JC	The Hague
14:30	Kubík 4'		9' (pen.) Junker; 12' Delorge; 70' Hempte	Stadium: Kyocera Stadion; Attendance: 9,859; Referee: Tom van Sichem

22 August 2010 3	VVV-Venlo	2–3	ADO Den Haag	Venlo
14:30	Ahahaoui 23'; Boymans 90+2'		2', 61' Bulykin; 89' Verhoek	Stadium: De Koel; Attendance: 7,000; Referee: Bas Nijhuis

29 August 2010 4	ADO Den Haag	2–2	PSV	The Hague
14:30	Derijck 56'; Kubík 81'		8' Afellay; 73' Rodríguez	Stadium: Kyocera Stadion; Attendance: 11,334; Referee: Pol van Boekel

12 September 2010 5	ADO Den Haag	2–2	De Graafschap	The Hague
14:30	Bulykin 11'; Visser 70'		73', 87' Bargas	Stadium: Kyocera Stadion; Attendance: 11,860; Referee: Pieter Vink

18 September 2010 6	Willem II	2–4	ADO Den Haag	Tilburg
20:45	Rigters 5'; Levchenko 52'		38' Radosavljević; 49', 80' Kubík; 90+2' Bulykin	Stadium: Koning Willem II Stadion; Attendance: 10,300; Referee: Björn Kuipers

25 September 2010 7	ADO Den Haag	3–2	Heracles	The Hague
19:45	Immers 29'; Bulykin 44', 70'		17' Plet; 66' Everton	Stadium: Kyocera Stadion; Attendance: 12,000; Referee: Ed Janssen

3 October 2010 8	Heerenveen	0–0	ADO Den Haag	Heerenveen
14:30				Stadium: Abe Lenstra Stadion; Attendance: 25,400; Referee: Tom van Sichem

16 October 2010 9	ADO Den Haag	2–1	Excelsior	The Hague
19:45	Kubík 65'; Bulykin 90'		45' (pen.) Vincken; (red card) 68' Nelom; (red card) 74' Nieveld	Stadium: Kyocera Stadion; Attendance: 14,993; Referee: Reinold Wiedemeijer

24 October 2010 10	Twente	3–2	ADO Den Haag	Enschede
14:30	Janssen 27'; Ruiz 57' (pen.); Janko 70'		44' Bulykin; 54' Kubík	Stadium: De Grolsch Veste; Attendance: 23,800; Referee: Pol van Boekel

27 October 2010 11	Groningen	3–1	ADO Den Haag	Groningen
19:00	Ivens 48'; Granqvist 58'; Van de Laak 89'		12' Immers	Stadium: Euroborg; Attendance: 21,851; Referee: Haverkort

31 October 2010 12	ADO Den Haag	1–0	Utrecht	The Hague
12:30	Immers 45+1'			Stadium: Kyocera Stadion; Attendance: 10,778; Referee: van Hulten

7 November 2010 13	Ajax	0–1	ADO Den Haag	Amsterdam
12:30			44' Verhoek	Stadium: Amsterdam Arena; Attendance: 43,914; Referee: Bas Nijhuis

14 November 2010 14	NEC	1–1	ADO Den Haag	Nijmegen
14:30	Zomer 90'		39' (o.g.) Will	Stadium: Goffertpark; Attendance: 12,400; Referee: Michel Winter

21 November 2010 15	ADO Den Haag	3–0	NAC Breda	The Hague
14:30	Bulykin 5'; Verhoek 50'; Radosavljević 65'			Stadium: Kyocera Stadion; Attendance: 14,500; Referee: Eric Braamhaar

28 November 2010 16	Feyenoord	2–1	ADO Den Haag	Rotterdam
12:30	Radosavljević 47' (o.g.); Castaignos 59'		45+2' Bulykin	Stadium: De Kuip; Attendance: 42,000; Referee: Wiedemeijer

5 December 2010 17	ADO Den Haag	0–2	AZ	The Hague
14:30			40' (pen.) Elm; 51' Martens	Stadium: Kyocera Stadion; Attendance: 12,000; Referee: Nijhuis

11 December 2010 18	Roda JC	1–1	ADO Den Haag	Kerkrade
19:45	Janssen 9'		13' Bulykin	Stadium: Parkstad Limburg Stadion; Attendance: 12,900; Referee: van Hulten

18 December 2010 19	ADO Den Haag	2–1	Willem II	The Hague
20:45	Vossebelt 10' (o.g.); Lampi 52' (o.g.)		51' Biemans	Stadium: Kyocera Stadion; Attendance: 12,000; Referee: Serdar Gözübüyük

21 January 2011 20	ADO Den Haag	3–1	Heerenveen	The Hague
20:45	Buijs 12'; Vicento 53'; Immers 77'		76' Dost	Stadium: Kyocera Stadium; Attendance: 11,000; Referee: Richard Liesveld

30 January 2011 21	Excelsior	1–5	ADO Den Haag	Rotterdam
12:30	Vincken 13'; Bovenberg (red card) 24'		20', 41' Bulykin; 29' Kubík; 52' Toornstra; 65' Verhoek	Stadium: Stadion Woudestijn; Attendance: 2,480; Referee: Tom van Sichem

5 February 2011 22	PSV	0–1	ADO Den Haag	Eindhoven
19:45			90+2' Verhoek	Stadium: Phillips Stadion; Attendance: 33,000; Referee: Pol van Boekel

12 February 2011 23	ADO Den Haag	3–0	VVV-Venlo	The Hague
18:45	Toornstra 53'; Bulykin 63' (pen.), 83'			Stadium: Kyocera Stadion; Attendance: 15,000; Referee: Vink

20 February 2011 24	ADO Den Haag	2–2	Feyenoord	The Hague
12:30	Vicento 81'; Bulykin 85'		30', 38' Castaignos	Stadium: Kyocera Stadion; Attendance: 15,000; Referee: Danny Makkelie

26 February 2011 25	NAC Breda	3–2	ADO Den Haag	Breda
20:45	Schilder 4', 47'; Fehér 61'		25' Verhoek; 34' (o.g.) Horváth; (yellow card) 40' (yellow-red card) 53' Kum	Stadium: Rat Verlegh Stadion; Attendance: 18,700; Referee: Janssen

5 March 2011 26	ADO Den Haag	5–1	NEC	The Hague
19:45	Immers 16'; Bulykin 28' (pen.); Verhoek 49'; Toornstra 52'; Brouwer 90+1'		18' Vleminckx; (red card) 87' Zimling	Stadium: Kyocera Stadion; Attendance: 15,000; Referee: van Sichem

13 March 2011 27	De Graafschap	1–0	ADO Den Haag	Doetinchem
12:30	Poepon 10'			Stadium: De Vijverberg; Attendance: 12,300; Referee: Pol van Boekel

20 March 2011 28	ADO Den Haag	3–2	Ajax	The Hague
12:30	Kubík 31'; Immers 76'; Derijck 87'		70' Vertonghen; 85' Eriksen	Stadium: Kyocera Stadion; Attendance: 15,000; Referee: Kuipers

3 April 2011 29	Utrecht	2–3	ADO Den Haag	Utrecht
12:30	Duplan 33'; Strootman 77'		39', (yellow card) 74' (yellow-red card) 76' Vicento; 63' Radosavljević; 66' Bulykin	Stadium: Stadion Galgenwaard; Attendance: 21,450; Referee: Makkelie

9 April 2011 30	ADO Den Haag	1–0	Vitesse	The Hague
19:45	Buijs 28'			Stadium: Kyocera Stadion; Attendance: 14,700; Referee: van Hulten

16 April 2011 31	AZ	3–1	ADO Den Haag	Alkmaar
20:45	Sigþórsson 44'; Holman 60'; Van der Velden 86'		67' Derijck	Stadium: AFAS Stadion; Attendance: 16,811; Referee: Braamhaar

22 April 2011 32	ADO Den Haag	1–2	Twente	The Hague
20:45	Bulykin 70'		61' Ruiz; 86' De Jong	Stadium: Kyocera Stadion; Attendance: 12,000; Referee: Wegereef

1 May 2011 33	ADO Den Haag	2–4	Groningen	The Hague
14:30	Bulykin 25', 42' (pen.)		13', 52' Andersson; 29' Stenman; 86' Hiariej	Stadium: Kyocera Stadion; Attendance: 14,800; Referee: Vink

==== KNVB Beker ====
21 September 2010 1	Excelsior '31	0–2	ADO Den Haag	Rijssen
20:00			25' Immers; 80' Bulykin	Stadium: Sportpark de Koerbelt; Attendance: 1,700; Referee: Bekebrede

11 November 2010 2	Groningen	1–1 (a.e.t.) (5–4 p)	ADO Den Haag	Groningen
20:45	Ivens 83'		63' Immers	Stadium: Euroborg; Attendance: 16,161; Referee: Blom
	Penalties
	(penalty scored) Granqvist; (penalty scored) Matavž; (penalty missed) Sparv; (penalty scored) Tadić; (penalty scored) Van de Laak; (penalty scored) Bacuna		Coutinho (penalty scored); Toornstra (penalty missed); Immers (penalty scored); Bulykin (penalty scored); Leeuwin (penalty scored); Kubík (penalty missed)
