= List of Dutch football transfers summer 2011 =

This is a list of transfers in Dutch football for the 2011 Summer transfer window. Only moves featuring an Eredivisie side and/or an Eerste Divisie side are listed.

The winter transfer window will open on July 1, 2011, and will close on August 31. Deals may be signed at any given moment in the season, but the actual transfer may only take place during the transfer window. Unattached players may sign at any moment.

Date	Name	Moving from	Moving to	Fee
5 January 2011	(Belgium) Gill Swerts	(Netherlands) AZ Alkmaar	(Netherlands) Feyenoord	Free
10 January 2011	(Hungary) Csaba Fehér	(Netherlands) NAC Breda	(Hungary) Újpest FC	Free
10 January 2011	(Netherlands) Ruud Wellenberg	(Netherlands) SV Epe	(Netherlands) Go Ahead Eagles	Free
29 January 2011	(Netherlands) Martijn Barto	(Netherlands) Harkemase Boys	(Netherlands) SC Cambuur	Free
30 January 2011	(Italy) Graziano Pellè	(Netherlands) AZ Alkmaar	(Italy) Parma F.C.	€1M
9 February 2011	(Netherlands) Mitchell Donald	(Netherlands) AFC Ajax	(Netherlands) Roda JC	Free
9 February 2011	(Netherlands) Willem Janssen	(Netherlands) Roda JC	(Netherlands) FC Twente	Free
14 February 2011	(Netherlands) Marco van der Heide	(Netherlands) Flevo Boys	(Netherlands) SC Cambuur	Free
18 February 2011	(Uruguay) Matías Jones	(Uruguay) Danubio F.C.	(Netherlands) FC Groningen	Undisclosed
22 February 2011	(Netherlands) Jan Kromkamp	(Netherlands) PSV Eindhoven	(Netherlands) Go Ahead Eagles	Free
22 February 2011	(Netherlands) Kevin van Veen	(Netherlands) Helmond Sport	(Netherlands) Dijkse Boys	Free
23 February 2011	(Belgium) Martijn Monteyne	(Belgium) Germinal Beerschot	(Netherlands) Roda JC	Free
27 February 2011	(Netherlands) Erwin Nieuwboer	(Netherlands) Heracles Almelo	(Netherlands) HSC '21	Free
1 March 2011	(Belgium) Davy De Beule	(Belgium) KV Kortrijk	(Netherlands) Roda JC	Free
4 March 2011	(Netherlands) Luc Castaignos	(Netherlands) Feyenoord	(Italy) Inter Milan	€3.5M
14 March 2011	(Netherlands) Marc Höcher	(Netherlands) Helmond Sport	(Netherlands) ADO Den Haag	Free
15 March 2011	(Netherlands) Patrick Gerritsen	(Netherlands) FC Twente	(Netherlands) Go Ahead Eagles	Free
18 March 2011	(Netherlands) Mart Dijkstra	(Netherlands) Harkemase Boys	(Netherlands) SC Cambuur	Free
22 March 2011	(Netherlands) Tim Cornelisse	(Netherlands) FC Utrecht	(Netherlands) FC Twente	Free
23 March 2011	(Sweden) Fredrik Stenman	(Netherlands) FC Groningen	(Belgium) Club Brugge	Free
23 March 2011	(Netherlands) Mark-Jan Fledderus	(Netherlands) Heracles Almelo	(Netherlands) Roda JC	Free
24 March 2011	(Netherlands) Bart van Hintum	(Netherlands) FC Dordrecht	(Netherlands) FC Zwolle	Free
25 March 2011	(Belgium) Björn Vleminckx	(Netherlands) NEC Nijmegen	(Belgium) Club Brugge	€3.3M
25 March 2011	(Netherlands) Bart van Brakel	(Netherlands) FC Eindhoven	(Netherlands) FC Den Bosch	Free
29 March 2011	(Belgium) Sven Kums	(Belgium) KV Kortrijk	(Netherlands) SC Heerenveen	€800K
29 March 2011	(Netherlands) Benjamin van den Broek	(England) Shrewsbury Town	(Netherlands) FC Den Bosch	Free
31 March 2011	(Netherlands) Leon Broekhof	(Netherlands) De Graafschap	(Netherlands) Roda JC	Free
31 March 2011	(Brazil) Éric	(Netherlands) FC Zwolle	(Netherlands) NAC Breda	Free
31 March 2011	(Netherlands) Jordy Buijs	(Netherlands) De Graafschap	(Netherlands) NAC Breda	Free
31 March 2011	(Netherlands) Rochdi Achenteh	(Netherlands) FC Eindhoven	(Netherlands) FC Zwolle	Free
1 April 2011	(Netherlands) Ewald Koster	(Netherlands) SC Veendam	(Netherlands) Harkemase Boys	Free
5 April 2011	(Netherlands) Jarchinio Antonia	(Netherlands) ADO Den Haag	(Netherlands) Go Ahead Eagles	Free
12 April 2011	(Netherlands) Jeffrey van Nuland	(Netherlands) Jong PSV	(Netherlands) Willem II Tilburg	Free
14 April 2011	(Morocco) Khalid Sinouh	(Netherlands) FC Utrecht	(Netherlands) PSV Eindhoven	Free
14 April 2011	(Netherlands) Ibad Muhamadu	(Netherlands) Helmond Sport	(Netherlands) SV Spakenburg	Free
15 April 2011	(Netherlands) Jeffrey Rijsdijk	(Netherlands) FC Groningen	(Netherlands) FC Dordrecht	Free
15 April 2011	(Netherlands) Arnoud van Toor	(Netherlands) AGOVV	(Netherlands) IJsselmeervogels	Free
19 April 2011	(Netherlands) Kevin Hofland	(Netherlands) Feyenoord	(Cyprus) AEK Larnaca	Free
20 April 2011	(Denmark) Michael Silberbauer	(Netherlands) FC Utrecht	(Switzerland) Young Boys Bern	Free
20 April 2011	(Serbia) Vladan Kujovic	(Netherlands) Willem II Tilburg	(Belgium) Club Brugge	Free
21 April 2011	(Netherlands) Darryl Lachman	(Netherlands) FC Groningen	(Netherlands) FC Zwolle	Free
22 April 2011	(Netherlands) Lorenzo Burnet	(Netherlands) Jong Ajax	(Netherlands) FC Groningen	Free
22 April 2011	(Netherlands) Johan Kappelhof	(Netherlands) Jong Ajax	(Netherlands) FC Groningen	Free
22 April 2011	(Netherlands) René van Dieren	(Netherlands) Sparta Rotterdam	(Netherlands) FC Lienden	Free
22 April 2011	(Netherlands) Melvin de Leeuw	(Netherlands) RBC Roosendaal	(Netherlands) SC Cambuur	Free
24 April 2011	(Netherlands) Bernard Hofstede	(Netherlands) Fortuna Sittard	(Netherlands) De Treffers	Free
26 April 2011	(Netherlands) Wouter de Vogel	(Netherlands) AZ Alkmaar	(Netherlands) ADO Den Haag	Free
26 April 2011	(Philippines) Paul Mulders	(Netherlands) AGOVV	(Netherlands) ADO Den Haag	Free
26 April 2011	(Netherlands) Rudy Jansen	(Netherlands) FC Zwolle	(Netherlands) SV Spakenburg	Free
27 April 2011	(Netherlands) Rico Wolven	(Netherlands) Jong Heerenveen	(Netherlands) SC Veendam	Free
29 April 2011	(Netherlands) Bas Sibum	(Netherlands) NEC Nijmegen	(Germany) Alemannia Aachen	Free
5 May 2011	(Netherlands) Ralf Seuntjens	(Netherlands) RBC Roosendaal	(Netherlands) FC Den Bosch	Free
7 May 2011	(Netherlands) Wilmer Kousemaker	(Netherlands) FC Den Bosch	(Netherlands) FC Dordrecht	Free
9 May 2011	(Netherlands) David Abdul	(Netherlands) Sparta Rotterdam	(Netherlands) RVVH	Free
10 May 2011	(Netherlands) Gerry Koning	(Netherlands) SC Heerenveen	(Netherlands) FC Volendam	Free
11 May 2011	(Netherlands) Jeffrey Vlug	(Netherlands) FC Eindhoven	(Netherlands) FC Den Bosch	Free
12 May 2011	(Netherlands) Melvin Platje	(Netherlands) FC Volendam	(Netherlands) NEC Nijmegen	Free
13 May 2011	(Netherlands) Jaime Bruinier	(Netherlands) AGOVV	(Netherlands) Sparta Rotterdam	Free
13 May 2011	(Netherlands) Marien Willemsen	(Netherlands) Almere City FC	(Netherlands) SV Spakenburg	Free
15 May 2011	(Netherlands) René Wessels	(Netherlands) SC Veendam	(Netherlands) SV Meppen	Free
16 May 2011	(Netherlands) Rob Wielaert	(Netherlands) AFC Ajax	(Netherlands) Roda JC	Free
18 May 2011	(Netherlands) Rik Sebens	(Netherlands) De Graafschap	(Netherlands) Achilles '29	Free
18 May 2011	(Netherlands) Pim Gubbels	(Netherlands) Fortuna Sittard	(Netherlands) GSV '26	Free
19 May 2011	(Netherlands) Lorenzo Davids	(Netherlands) NEC Nijmegen	(Germany) FC Augsburg	Free
22 May 2011	(South Africa) Thulani Serero	(South Africa) Ajax CT	(Netherlands) AFC Ajax	€2.5M
23 May 2011	(Netherlands) Theo Janssen	(Netherlands) FC Twente	(Netherlands) AFC Ajax	€3M
24 May 2011	(Netherlands) Lerin Duarte	(Netherlands) Sparta Rotterdam	(Netherlands) Heracles Almelo	Undisclosed
24 May 2011	(Greece) Michael Vakalopoulos	(Netherlands) Vitesse Arnhem	(Netherlands) AGOVV	Loan
24 May 2011	(Netherlands) Just Berends	(Netherlands) Vitesse Arnhem	(Netherlands) AGOVV	Loan
24 May 2011	(Netherlands) Jerry van Ewijk	(Netherlands) Vitesse Arnhem	(Netherlands) AGOVV	Loan
25 May 2011	(Netherlands) Stef Nijland	(Netherlands) PSV Eindhoven	(Netherlands) NEC Nijmegen	Loan
25 May 2011	(Netherlands) Eelco Horsten	(Netherlands) Roda JC	(Netherlands) VV UNA	Free
25 May 2011	(Netherlands) Guyon Fernandez	(Netherlands) Excelsior Rotterdam	(Netherlands) Feyenoord	Free
25 May 2011	(Netherlands) Miquel Nelom	(Netherlands) Excelsior Rotterdam	(Netherlands) Feyenoord	Free
25 May 2011	(Liberia) Dulee Johnson	(Greece) Panetolikos F.C.	(Netherlands) De Graafschap	Free
26 May 2011	(Netherlands) Roly Bonevacia	(Netherlands) AFC Ajax	(Netherlands) NAC Breda	Loan
26 May 2011	(Netherlands) Mitchell te Vrede	(Netherlands) Jong AZ	(Netherlands) Excelsior Rotterdam	Free
26 May 2011	(Netherlands) Mitchell van Gastel	(Netherlands) Sparta Rotterdam	(Netherlands) VV Nieuwenhoorn	Free
26 May 2011	(Netherlands) Joey Brock	(Netherlands) RBC Roosendaal	(Netherlands) FC Den Bosch	Free
27 May 2011	(Netherlands) Joël Tillema	(Netherlands) ADO Den Haag	(Netherlands) SVV Scheveningen	Free
27 May 2011	(Netherlands) Patrick ter Mate	(Netherlands) Jong Vitesse	(Netherlands) Go Ahead Eagles	Free
30 May 2011	(Netherlands) Wilko de Vogt	(Netherlands) FC Twente	(Netherlands) VVV-Venlo	Free
30 May 2011	(Netherlands) Barry Maguire	(Netherlands) FC Utrecht	(Netherlands) VVV-Venlo	Free
30 May 2011	(Netherlands) Norair Mamedov	(Netherlands) Jong FC Groningen	(Netherlands) FC Zwolle	Free
31 May 2011	(Netherlands) Mark Veldmate	(Netherlands) Helmond Sport	(Netherlands) Sparta Rotterdam	Free
31 May 2011	(Netherlands) Jeroen Veldmate	(Netherlands) FC Groningen	(Netherlands) Sparta Rotterdam	Free
31 May 2011	(Brazil) Bruno Andrade	(Netherlands) Helmond Sport	(Belgium) Sint-Truiden	Free
1 June 2011	(Netherlands) Ryan Koolwijk	(Netherlands) Excelsior Rotterdam	(Netherlands) NEC Nijmegen	Free
1 June 2011	(Netherlands) Karim Fachtali	(Netherlands) Almere City FC	(Netherlands) RKC Waalwijk	Free
1 June 2011	(Bosnia and Herzegovina) Esad Razić	(Netherlands) FC Oss	(Germany) Rot-Weiß Oberhausen	Free
3 June 2011	(Netherlands) Michiel van den Berg	(Netherlands) Sparta Rotterdam	(Netherlands) FC 's-Gravenzande	Free
3 June 2011	(Netherlands) Donny de Groot	(Netherlands) RKC Waalwijk	(Netherlands) Willem II Tilburg	Free
3 June 2011	(Netherlands) Martijn van der Laan	(Netherlands) SC Veendam	(Netherlands) SC Cambuur	Free
3 June 2011	(Netherlands) Marco Bizot	(Netherlands) AFC Ajax	(Netherlands) SC Cambuur	Loan
3 June 2011	(Netherlands) Jonathan Vosselman	(Netherlands) Go Ahead Eagles	(Netherlands) SC Cambuur	Free
3 June 2011	(Netherlands) Osama Rashid	(Netherlands) Jong Feyenoord	(Netherlands) FC Den Bosch	Free
4 June 2011	(Netherlands) Giorgio Achterberg	(Netherlands) ADO Den Haag	(Netherlands) FC Dordrecht	Loan
4 June 2011	(Netherlands) Roderick Gielisse	(Netherlands) ADO Den Haag	(Netherlands) FC Dordrecht	Loan
4 June 2011	(Turkey) Serhat Köksal	(Netherlands) ADO Den Haag	(Netherlands) FC Dordrecht	Loan
4 June 2011	(Turkey) Sinan Kaloglu	(Netherlands) Vitesse Arnhem	(Turkey) Karabükspor	Free
4 June 2011	(Belgium) Robbie Haemhouts	(Netherlands) Helmond Sport	(Netherlands) Willem II Tilburg	Free
6 June 2011	(Netherlands) Erik Wegh	(Netherlands) FC Oss	(Netherlands) De Bataven	Free
6 June 2011	(Netherlands) Paul Beekmans	(Netherlands) SC Cambuur	(Australia) Gold Coast United	Free
7 June 2011	(Norway) Pa-Modou Kah	(Netherlands) Roda JC	(Qatar) Al-Khor	Free
7 June 2011	(Netherlands) Tjaronn Chery	(Netherlands) FC Emmen	(Netherlands) ADO Den Haag	Undisclosed.
7 June 2011	(Netherlands) Mike Zonneveld	(Cyprus) AEL Limassol	(Netherlands) NAC Breda	Free
7 June 2011	(Netherlands) Ryan van Dijk	(Netherlands) NEC Nijmegen	(Netherlands) FC Oss	Free
7 June 2011	(Netherlands) Jordy Braam	(Netherlands) Jong NEC	(Netherlands) FC Oss	Free
7 June 2011	(Netherlands) Dennis Janssen	(Netherlands) Jong NEC	(Netherlands) FC Oss	Free
7 June 2011	(Netherlands) Marc Roebbers	(Netherlands) Jong NEC	(Netherlands) FC Oss	Free
7 June 2011	(Netherlands) Dominique Scholten	(Netherlands) FC Oss	(Netherlands) Achilles '29	Free
8 June 2011	(Netherlands) Wesley de Ruiter	(Netherlands) FC Utrecht	(Netherlands) Excelsior Rotterdam	Free
8 June 2011	(Netherlands) Jordy Deckers	(Netherlands) Jong Ajax	(Netherlands) Excelsior Rotterdam	Free
8 June 2011	(Netherlands) Moussa Kalisse	(Netherlands) FC Dordrecht	(Romania) FCM Targu Mureş	Free
9 June 2011	(Netherlands) Michael de Leeuw	(Netherlands) SC Veendam	(Netherlands) De Graafschap	Undisclosed
9 June 2011	(Netherlands) Roel Janssen	(Netherlands) VVV-Venlo	(Netherlands) Fortuna Sittard	Free
9 June 2011	(Slovenia) Aleksander Šeliga	(Netherlands) Sparta Rotterdam	(Slovenia) NK Olimpija	Free
9 June 2011	(Netherlands) Eric Quekel	(Netherlands) FC Dordrecht	(Netherlands) Helmond Sport	Free
9 June 2011	(Netherlands) Theo Lucius	(Netherlands) FC Den Bosch	(Netherlands) FC Eindhoven	Non-contract
10 June 2011	(Netherlands) Samuel Scheimann	(Netherlands) FC Den Bosch	(Netherlands) Excelsior Rotterdam	Free
10 June 2011	(Netherlands) Florian Jozefzoon	(Netherlands) AFC Ajax	(Netherlands) NAC Breda	Loan
10 June 2011	(Netherlands) Niels Vorthoren	(Netherlands) FC Den Bosch	(Netherlands) Excelsior Rotterdam	Free
10 June 2011	(Netherlands) Roland Alberg	(Netherlands) Jong AZ	(Netherlands) Excelsior Rotterdam	Free
10 June 2011	(Netherlands) Dennis Krohne	(Netherlands) Harkemase Boys	(Netherlands) AGOVV	Free
10 June 2011	(Netherlands) Charlie van den Ouweland	Unattached	(Netherlands) FC Oss	Free
11 June 2011	(Netherlands) Gerard Aafjes	(Netherlands) MVV	(Netherlands) FC Zwolle	Free
11 June 2011	(Netherlands) Yannick de Wit	Unattached	(Netherlands) Go Ahead Eagles	Free
12 June 2011	(Hungary) Balázs Dzsudzsák	(Netherlands) PSV Eindhoven	(Russia) Anzhi	€14M
12 June 2011	(Netherlands) Tom Boks	(Netherlands) ADO Den Haag	(Netherlands) SVV Scheveningen	Free
13 June 2011	(Netherlands) Boy Waterman	(Netherlands) AZ Alkmaar	(Germany) Alemannia Aachen	Free
13 June 2011	(Netherlands) Paddy John	(Netherlands) Fortuna Sittard	(Germany) VfL Osnabrück	Free
14 June 2011	(Serbia) Žarko Grabovač	(Netherlands) Fortuna Sittard	(Netherlands) Helmond Sport	Free
15 June 2011	(Netherlands) Marvin Zeegelaar	(Netherlands) AFC Ajax	(Spain) Espanyol	Free
15 June 2011	(Sweden) Andreas Granqvist	(Netherlands) FC Groningen	(Italy) Genoa	€2M
15 June 2011	(Norway) Christian Grindheim	(Netherlands) SC Heerenveen	(Denmark) FC Copenhagen	€750K
15 June 2011	(Netherlands) Mark Otten	(Netherlands) NEC Nijmegen	(Hungary) Ferencvárosi TC	Free
15 June 2011	(Japan) Yoshiaki Takagi	(Japan) Tokyo Verdy	(Netherlands) FC Utrecht	Undisclosed
15 June 2011	(Netherlands) Roy de Ruiter	(Netherlands) AGOVV	(Netherlands) FC Oss	Free
15 June 2011	(Netherlands) Jeffrey Hoogenbosch	(Netherlands) VV Union	(Netherlands) FC Oss	Free
16 June 2011	(Netherlands) Nassir Maachi	(Netherlands) SC Cambuur	(Netherlands) FC Zwolle	Free
17 June 2011	(Netherlands) Tim Receveur	(Netherlands) Jong NAC	(Netherlands) AGOVV	Free
17 June 2011	(Netherlands) Randy Wolters	(Netherlands) Jong Utrecht	(Netherlands) FC Emmen	Free
16 June 2011	(Netherlands) Stijn Schaars	(Netherlands) AZ Alkmaar	(Portugal) Sporting CP	€850K
16 June 2011	(Netherlands) Frank van Kouwen	(Netherlands) VVV-Venlo	(Netherlands) FC Eindhoven	Non-contract
16 June 2011	(Netherlands) Jerge Hoefdraad	(Netherlands) Almere City FC	(Netherlands) Telstar	Free
16 June 2011	(France) Kevin Diaz	(Netherlands) SC Cambuur	(Netherlands) Fortuna Sittard	Free
17 June 2011	(Belgium) Davy De Fauw	(Netherlands) Roda JC	(Belgium) SV Zulte Waregem	Undisclosed
17 June 2011	(Netherlands) Pascal Bosschaart	(Netherlands) ADO Den Haag	(Australia) Sydney FC	Free
17 June 2011	(Belgium) Nayib Lagouireh	(Netherlands) Jong Feyenoord	(Netherlands) Excelsior Rotterdam	Free
17 June 2011	(Netherlands) Erwin Nuytinck	(Netherlands) RBC Roosendaal	(Netherlands) Excelsior Rotterdam	Free
17 June 2011	(Netherlands) Hans Mulder	(Netherlands) RKC Waalwijk	(Netherlands) Willem II Tilburg	Free
17 June 2011	(Netherlands) Martijn Thomassen	(Netherlands) Jong PSV	(Netherlands) AGOVV	Free
17 June 2011	(Belgium) Marc Wagemakers	(Belgium) Sint-Truiden	(Netherlands) Fortuna Sittard	Free
17 June 2011	(Belgium) Fabio Caracciolo	(Netherlands) Fortuna Sittard	(Belgium) CS Visé	Undisclosed
17 June 2011	(Iran) Reza Ghoochannejhad	(Netherlands) SC Cambuur	(Belgium) Sint-Truiden	Undisclosed
17 June 2011	(Netherlands) Danny Guijt	(Netherlands) SC Cambuur	(Netherlands) Willem II Tilburg	Free
18 June 2011	(Netherlands) Richard Stolte	(Netherlands) SC Heerenveen	(Netherlands) Fortuna Sittard	Loan
18 June 2011	(Netherlands) Danny Schreurs	(Netherlands) FC Zwolle	(Netherlands) Willem II Tilburg	Free
18 June 2011	(Netherlands) Kevin Huijsman	(Netherlands) Jong Utrecht	(Netherlands) FC Oss	Free
20 June 2011	(Netherlands) Derk Boerrigter	(Netherlands) RKC Waalwijk	(Netherlands) AFC Ajax	Undisclosed
20 June 2011	(Netherlands) Michael Jansen	(Netherlands) FC Groningen	(Netherlands) Go Ahead Eagles	Free
20 June 2011	(Sweden) Rasmus Lindgren	(Netherlands) AFC Ajax	(Austria) Salzburg	Free
20 June 2011	(Netherlands) Jasper Waalkens	(Netherlands) Willem II Tilburg	(Netherlands) FC Eindhoven	Non-contract
20 June 2011	(Belgium) David Meul	(Netherlands) SC Cambuur	(Netherlands) Willem II Tilburg	Free
21 June 2011	(Netherlands) Gijs Luirink	(Netherlands) AZ Alkmaar	(Netherlands) Sparta Rotterdam	Free
21 June 2011	(Netherlands) Tom Overtoom	(Netherlands) Jong Ajax	(Netherlands) Sparta Rotterdam	Free
21 June 2011	(Netherlands) Jorrit Kunst	(Netherlands) FC Groningen	(Netherlands) FC Emmen	Free
21 June 2011	(Netherlands) Leroy Resodihardjo	(Netherlands) ADO Den Haag	(Netherlands) Almere City FC	Free
21 June 2011	(Netherlands) Gino Felixdaal	(Netherlands) Vitesse Arnhem	(Netherlands) Almere City FC	Free
21 June 2011	(Netherlands) Mitchell Kappenberg	(Netherlands) HHC Hardenberg	(Netherlands) Almere City FC	Free
21 June 2011	(Netherlands) Kevin Jansen	(Netherlands) Jong Feyenoord	(Netherlands) Excelsior Rotterdam	Loan
21 June 2011	(Netherlands) Marley Berkvens	(Netherlands) Jong Feyenoord	(Netherlands) Excelsior Rotterdam	Loan
21 June 2011	(Netherlands) Daan Smith	(Netherlands) Jong Feyenoord	(Netherlands) Excelsior Rotterdam	Loan
21 June 2011	(Netherlands) Tim Eekman	(Netherlands) Jong Feyenoord	(Netherlands) Excelsior Rotterdam	Free
21 June 2011	(Netherlands) Wout Droste	(Netherlands) Go Ahead Eagles	(Netherlands) SC Cambuur	Free
21 June 2011	(Netherlands) Erik Bakker	(Netherlands) FC Zwolle	(Netherlands) SC Cambuur	Undisclosed
21 June 2011	(Denmark) Marc Nygaard	(Germany) SpVgg Unterhaching	(Netherlands) Helmond Sport	Free
22 June 2011	(Mexico) Hector Moreno	(Netherlands) AZ Alkmaar	(Spain) Espanyol	€4M
22 June 2011	(Belgium) Bart Biemans	(Netherlands) Willem II Tilburg	(Netherlands) Roda JC	Free
22 June 2011	(Netherlands) Peter Reekers	(Netherlands) Heracles Almelo	(Netherlands) AGOVV	Free
22 June 2011	(Denmark) Morten Skoubo	(Netherlands) FC Utrecht	(Denmark) Odense Boldklub	Free
22 June 2011	(Netherlands) Kevin Brands	(Netherlands) Jong AZ	(Netherlands) Telstar	Free
22 June 2011	(Turkey) Gurçan Sari	(Turkey) Gençlerbirligi	(Netherlands) Telstar	Free
22 June 2011	(Netherlands) Steef Nieuwendaal	(Netherlands) FC Den Bosch	(Netherlands) Sparta Rotterdam	Free
22 June 2011	(Netherlands) Sidney Schmeltz	(Netherlands) Almere City FC	(Netherlands) Sparta Rotterdam	Free
22 June 2011	(Netherlands) Pepijn Veerman	(Netherlands) RBC Roosendaal	(Netherlands) Helmond Sport	Free
23 June 2011	(Serbia) Aleksandar Rankovic	(Netherlands) ADO Den Haag	(Serbia) Partizan Belgrade	Free
23 June 2011	(Netherlands) Santy Hulst	(Netherlands) ADO Den Haag	(Netherlands) FC Dordrecht	Free
23 June 2011	(Netherlands) Cees Toet	(Netherlands) RBC Roosendaal	(Netherlands) Almere City FC	Free
24 June 2011	(Serbia) Jagos Vukovic	(Netherlands) PSV Eindhoven	(Netherlands) Roda JC	Loan
24 June 2011	(Netherlands) Jeroen Zoet	(Netherlands) PSV Eindhoven	(Netherlands) RKC Waalwijk	Loan
24 June 2011	(Netherlands) Kees Kwakman	(Germany) FC Augsburg	(Netherlands) FC Groningen	Free
24 June 2011	(Sweden) Emil Johansson	(Norway) Molde FK	(Netherlands) FC Groningen	€550K
24 June 2011	(Netherlands) Serhat Koç	(Netherlands) FC Groningen	(Netherlands) FC Eindhoven	Free
24 June 2011	(Netherlands) Joost Ebergen	(Netherlands) NEC Nijmegen	(Netherlands) FC Oss	Free
24 June 2011	(Germany) Benjamin Baltes	(Netherlands) Excelsior Rotterdam	(Germany) Wuppertaler SV	Free
24 June 2011	(Germany) Florian Riedel	(Netherlands) AGOVV	(Germany) VfL Osnabrück	Free
24 June 2011	(Netherlands) Gilian Justiana	(Netherlands) FC Zwolle	(Netherlands) Helmond Sport	Undisclosed
24 June 2011	(Netherlands) Ilja van Leerdam	(Netherlands) Helmond Sport	(Canada) FC Edmonton	Free
24 June 2011	(Netherlands) Bart van Muyen	(Netherlands) FC Dordrecht	(Netherlands) FC Oss	Free
25 June 2011	(Netherlands) Sjoerd Ars	(Netherlands) FC Zwolle	(Bulgaria) Levski Sofia	€300K
25 June 2011	(Spain) Gonzalo García García	(Netherlands) FC Groningen	(Cyprus) AEK Larnaca	Free
25 June 2011	(Netherlands) Luis Pedro	(Netherlands) Go Ahead Eagles	(Netherlands) Heracles Almelo	Undisclosed
25 June 2011	(Netherlands) Marcel van der Sloot	(Netherlands) FC Dordrecht	(Netherlands) FC Oss	Free
26 June 2011	(Brazil) Leonardo	(Netherlands) NAC Breda	(Austria) Salzburg	Loan
26 June 2011	(Netherlands) Randy Rustenberg	(Netherlands) AGOVV	(Netherlands) FC Emmen	Free
26 June 2011	(Netherlands) Harmen Kuperus	(Netherlands) Willem II Tilburg	(Netherlands) FC Emmen	Free
26 June 2011	(Morocco) Brahim Zaari	(Netherlands) FC Den Bosch	(Netherlands) FC Eindhoven	Free
27 June 2011	(Slovakia) Filip Lukšík	(Slovakia) FK Senica	(Netherlands) ADO Den Haag	Undisclosed
27 June 2011	(South Korea) Hyun-Jun Suk	(Netherlands) AFC Ajax	(Netherlands) FC Groningen	Free
27 June 2011	(Netherlands) Ruud Boymans	(Netherlands) VVV-Venlo	(Netherlands) AZ Alkmaar	Undisclosed
27 June 2011	(Netherlands) Xander Houtkoop	(Netherlands) Heracles Almelo	(Netherlands) Go Ahead Eagles	Free
27 June 2011	(Netherlands) Gerald Sibon	(Australia) Melbourne Heart	(Netherlands) SC Heerenveen	Free
27 June 2011	(Netherlands) Dennis Hollart	(Netherlands) Go Ahead Eagles	(Netherlands) Almere City FC	Free
27 June 2011	(Netherlands) Josemar Makiavala	(Netherlands) Jong PSV	(Netherlands) FC Eindhoven	Free
28 June 2011	(Belgium) Mats Rits	(Belgium) Germinal Beerschot	(Netherlands) AFC Ajax	Free
28 June 2011	(Belgium) Dries Mertens	(Netherlands) FC Utrecht	(Netherlands) PSV Eindhoven	€8.5M
28 June 2011	(Netherlands) Kevin Strootman	(Netherlands) FC Utrecht	(Netherlands) PSV Eindhoven	€4.5M
28 June 2011	(Sweden) Philip Haglund	(Netherlands) SC Heerenveen	(Sweden) IFK Göteborg	Undisclosed
28 June 2011	(Netherlands) Danny Menting	(Netherlands) FC Groningen	(Netherlands) SC Veendam	Loan
29 June 2011	(Netherlands) Danny Koevermans	(Netherlands) PSV Eindhoven	(Canada) Toronto FC	Free
29 June 2011	(Netherlands) Tim de Cler	(Netherlands) Feyenoord	(Cyprus) AEK Larnaca	Free
29 June 2011	(Netherlands) Furkan Alakmak	(Netherlands) NEC Nijmegen	(Netherlands) RKC Waalwijk	Free
29 June 2011	(Netherlands) Yanic Wildschut	(Netherlands) FC Zwolle	(Netherlands) VVV-Venlo	Undisclosed
30 June 2011	(Azerbaijan) Vagif Javadov	(Netherlands) FC Twente	(Russia) Volga NN	Free
30 June 2011	(Netherlands) Nick van der Velden	(Netherlands) AZ Alkmaar	(Netherlands) NEC Nijmegen	Free
30 June 2011	(Belgium) Rubin Dantschotter	(Belgium) Cercle Brugge	(Netherlands) Sparta Rotterdam	Loan
30 June 2011	(Netherlands) Cendrino Misidjan	(Netherlands) FC Oss	(Netherlands) Almere City FC	Free
1 July 2011	(Netherlands) Danny Post	(Netherlands) FC Groningen	(Netherlands) FC Dordrecht	Free
1 July 2011	(Netherlands) Collin van Eijk	(Netherlands) Roda JC	(Netherlands) MVV	Free
1 July 2011	(Netherlands) Danny Buijs	(Netherlands) ADO Den Haag	(Scotland) Kilmarnock F.C.	Free
1 July 2011	(Netherlands) Roland Bergkamp	(Netherlands) Excelsior Rotterdam	(England) Brighton & Hove Albion	Free
1 July 2011	(Netherlands) Peter Jungschläger	(Netherlands) De Graafschap	(Australia) Gold Coast United	Free
1 July 2011	(Netherlands) Paul de Lange	(Netherlands) FC Volendam	(Netherlands) Almere City FC	Loan
1 July 2011	(Netherlands) Thijs Sluijter	(Netherlands) FC Volendam	(Netherlands) Almere City FC	Loan
2 July 2011	(Netherlands) Sergio Padt	(Netherlands) AFC Ajax	(Belgium) AA Gent	€300K
2 July 2011	(Netherlands) Harrie Gommans	Unattached	(Netherlands) Fortuna Sittard	Free
4 July 2011	(Netherlands) Georginio Wijnaldum	(Netherlands) Feyenoord	(Netherlands) PSV Eindhoven	€5M
4 July 2011	(Brazil) André Bahia	(Netherlands) Feyenoord	(Turkey) Samsunspor	Undisclosed
4 July 2011	(Germany) Nico Pellatz	(Netherlands) ADO Den Haag	(Netherlands) Sparta Rotterdam	Free
4 July 2011	(Iceland) Kolbeinn Sigþórsson	(Netherlands) AZ Alkmaar	(Netherlands) AFC Ajax	€5M
4 July 2011	(Netherlands) Jerson Ribeiro	(Netherlands) Excelsior Rotterdam	(Netherlands) Almere City FC	Loan
4 July 2011	(Netherlands) Josimar Lima	(Netherlands) Willem II Tilburg	(Netherlands) FC Dordrecht	Free
5 July 2011	(Netherlands) Adnan Alisic	(Netherlands) Excelsior Rotterdam	(Hungary) Debreceni VSC	Free
6 July 2011	(Netherlands) Demy de Zeeuw	(Netherlands) AFC Ajax	(Russia) Spartak Moscow	€6M
6 July 2011	(Netherlands) Alexander Bannink	(Netherlands) FC Twente	(Netherlands) FC Zwolle	Loan
6 July 2011	(Netherlands) Furdjel Narsingh	(Netherlands) Jong AZ	(Netherlands) FC Zwolle	Free
6 July 2011	(Estonia) Marko Meerits	(Estonia) FC Flora	(Netherlands) Vitesse Arnhem	Undisclosed
6 July 2011	(Netherlands) Deniz Aslan	(Netherlands) Helmond Sport	(Turkey) Bursaspor	Free
6 July 2011	(Belgium) Timothy Dreesen	(Belgium) KV Turnhout	(Netherlands) Fortuna Sittard	Free
6 July 2011	(Switzerland) Stephan Keller	(Australia) Sydney FC	(Netherlands) Willem II Tilburg	Free
6 July 2011	(Argentina) Dario Cvitanich	(Netherlands) AFC Ajax	(Argentina) Boca Juniors	Loan
7 July 2011	(Netherlands) Johan Voskamp	(Netherlands) Sparta Rotterdam	(Poland) Śląsk Wrocław	€300K
7 July 2011	(Belgium) Kevin Begois	(Netherlands) VVV-Venlo	(Netherlands) FC Den Bosch	Free
7 July 2011	(Netherlands) Marcel Meeuwis	(Germany) Borussia Mönchengladbach	(Netherlands) VVV-Venlo	Undiscloed
7 July 2011	(Finland) Veli Lampi	(Netherlands) Willem II Tilburg	(Ukraine) Arsenal Kyiv	Free
8 July 2011	(Netherlands) Cuco Martina	(Netherlands) RBC Roosendaal	(Netherlands) RKC Waalwijk	Free
8 July 2011	(Ecuador) Renato Ibarra	(Ecuador) El Nacional	(Netherlands) Vitesse Arnhem	€2M
8 July 2011	(Belgium) Björn Sengier	(Belgium) KVSK United	(Netherlands) Helmond Sport	Free
9 July 2011	(Guinea) Alpha Ibrahim Bah	(Netherlands) MVV	(Netherlands) FC Eindhoven	Free
9 July 2011	(Sweden) Johan Mårtensson	(Sweden) GAIS Göteborg	(Netherlands) FC Utrecht	€1.1M
9 July 2011	(Netherlands) Rogier Molhoek	(Netherlands) Vitesse Arnhem	(Netherlands) VVV-Venlo	Free
9 July 2011	(Netherlands) Cees Paauwe	(Netherlands) Excelsior Rotterdam	(Netherlands) Quick '20	Free
10 July 2011	(Belgium) Tcho Tcho Nzuzu-Makuno	(Belgium) Olympic Charleroi	(Netherlands) Go Ahead Eagles	Free
11 July 2011	(Netherlands) Rihairo Meulens	(Netherlands) Roda JC	(Netherlands) Almere City FC	Free
11 July 2011	(Morocco) Adil Ramzi	(Qatar) Al-Wakrah Sports Club	(Netherlands) Roda JC	Free
11 July 2011	(Argentina) Hugo Bargas	(Netherlands) De Graafschap	(Argentina) All Boys	Free
12 July 2011	(Sweden) Marcus Nilsson	(Sweden) Helsingborgs IF	(Netherlands) FC Utrecht	€1.1M
12 July 2011	(Belgium) Jelle Merckx	(Belgium) Germinal Beerschot	(Netherlands) FC Eindhoven	Non-contract
12 July 2011	(Germany) Sebastian Stachnik	(Germany) Sportfreunde Lotte	(Netherlands) Helmond Sport	Free
12 July 2011	(Netherlands) Fouad Idabdelhay	(Netherlands) NAC Breda	(Germany) VfL Osnabrück	Free
12 July 2011	(Netherlands) Santi Kolk	(Germany) Union Berlin	(Netherlands) NAC Breda	Loan
12 July 2011	(Netherlands) Milano Koenders	(Netherlands) AZ Alkmaar	(Netherlands) NAC Breda	Loan
13 July 2011	(Netherlands) Charles Dissels	(Netherlands) FC Volendam	(Netherlands) SC Cambuur	Free
13 July 2011	(Serbia) Sead Mazreku	(Netherlands) Jong AZ	(Netherlands) Telstar	Loan
13 July 2011	(Belgium) Wouter Scheelen	(Belgium) KVC Westerlo	(Netherlands) Fortuna Sittard	Loan
13 July 2011	(Netherlands) Jelle Wagenaar	(Netherlands) Jong FC Groningen	(Netherlands) SC Veendam	Free
13 July 2011	(Netherlands) Jonathan Opoku	(Netherlands) RKHVV	(Netherlands) SC Veendam	Free
13 July 2011	(Greece) Panagiotis Rampavilas	(Netherlands) Jong Vitesse	(Netherlands) SC Veendam	Free
14 July 2011	(Mexico) Maza	(Netherlands) PSV Eindhoven	(Germany) VfB Stuttgart	€1.8M
14 July 2011	(Netherlands) Danny Schenkel	(Cyprus) AEK Larnaca	(Netherlands) Telstar	Free
14 July 2011	(Netherlands) Daryl van Mieghem	(Netherlands) Ajax	(Netherlands) Heracles Almelo	Free
14 July 2011	(Netherlands) Stephan Veenboer	(Netherlands) Zwaluwen '30	(Netherlands) Telstar	Free
15 July 2011	(Netherlands) Jeroen Tesselaar	(Netherlands) AZ Alkmaar	(Scotland) St Mirren	Free
15 July 2011	(Netherlands) Peter van der Vlag	(Netherlands) SC Veendam	(Netherlands) Go Ahead Eagles	Undisclosed
16 July 2011	(North Macedonia) Xhelil Abdulla	(North Macedonia) FK Skendija	(Netherlands) De Graafschap	Undisclosed
17 July 2011	(Netherlands) Albert van der Haar	(Netherlands) FC Zwolle	(Netherlands) VV Staphorst	Free
17 July 2011	(Brazil) Anderson	(Brazil) Flamengo	(Netherlands) Vitesse Arnhem	€250K
17 July 2011	(Brazil) Alex	(Brazil) Flamengo	(Netherlands) Vitesse Arnhem	€250K
18 July 2011	(Netherlands) Pepijn Kluin	(Netherlands) FC Zwolle	(Netherlands) SC Veendam	Free
18 July 2011	(Netherlands) Nick Kuipers	(Netherlands) IJsselmeervogels	(Netherlands) Telstar	Undisclosed
18 July 2011	(Germany) Sebastian Sumelka	(Germany) 1. FC Magdeburg	(Netherlands) FC Oss	Free
18 July 2011	(Netherlands) Rick Kruys	(Sweden) Malmö FF	(Netherlands) FC Volendam	Loan
18 July 2011	(Sweden) Alexander Gerndt	(Sweden) Helsingborgs IF	(Netherlands) FC Utrecht	€3M
18 July 2011	(Netherlands) Ellery Cairo	(Netherlands) Heracles Almelo	(Netherlands) AGOVV	Free
18 July 2011	(Iran) Agil Etemadi	(Netherlands) SC Veendam	(Netherlands) FC Groningen	Free
18 July 2011	(Netherlands) Leonard Nienhuis	(Netherlands) FC Groningen	(Netherlands) SC Veendam	Loan
19 July 2011	(Netherlands) Casper van Beers	(Netherlands) Willem II Tilburg	(Netherlands) FC Dordrecht	Loan
19 July 2011	(Netherlands) Fred Benson	(Netherlands) RKC Waalwijk	(Poland) Lechia Gdańsk	Free
19 July 2011	(Sweden) Faton Trstena	(Sweden) Helsingsborg IF	(Netherlands) Fortuna Sittard	Undisclosed
19 July 2011	(Syria) Sanharib Malki	(Belgium) KSC Lokeren	(Netherlands) Roda JC	Free
19 July 2011	(Belgium) Anthony Di Lallo	(Netherlands) Fortuna Sittard	(Belgium) KSV Roeselare	Free
20 July 2011	(Slovenia) Mitja Resek	(Slovenia) NK Maribor	(Netherlands) SC Heerenveen	Loan
20 July 2011	(United States) Jozy Altidore	(Spain) Villarreal CF	(Netherlands) AZ Alkmaar	€1.5M
21 July 2011	(Cape Verde) Toni Varela	(Netherlands) RKC Waalwijk	(Netherlands) Sparta Rotterdam	Free
21 July 2011	(Netherlands) Etienne Esajas	(Netherlands) Helmond Sport	(England) Swindon Town F.C.	Free
22 July 2011	(Belgium) Steve De Ridder	(Netherlands) De Graafschap	(England) Southampton F.C.	Undislosed
23 July 2011	(Belgium) Nadjim Haroun	Unattached	(Netherlands) AGOVV	Non-contract
23 July 2011	(Canada) Andrew Ornoch	(Canada) Mississauga Eagles FC	(Netherlands) Telstar	Free
24 July 2011	(Netherlands) Anouar Hadouir	(Netherlands) Roda JC	(Germany) Alemannia Aachen	Free
24 July 2011	(Netherlands) Luciano Dompig	(Netherlands) Almere City FC	(Belgium) Cercle Brugge	Free
24 July 2011	(Netherlands) Danny Hoesen	(England) Fulham F.C.	(Netherlands) Fortuna Sittard	Loan
24 July 2011	(Hungary) Jozsef Piller	(Hungary) Vasas Budapest	(Netherlands) SC Veendam	Free
25 July 2011	(Ukraine) Yevhen Levchenko	(Netherlands) Willem II Tilburg	(Australia) Adelaide United	Free
25 July 2011	(Netherlands) Arjan Christianen	(Netherlands) RBC Roosendaal	(Netherlands) Willem II Tilburg	Free
26 July 2011	(Netherlands) Koen van der Biezen	(Netherlands) Go Ahead Eagles	(Poland) MKS Cracovia	€400K
26 July 2011	(Curaçao) Prince Rajcomar	(Hungary) Zalaegerszegi TE	(Netherlands) MVV	Loan
27 July 2011	(South Africa) Bernard Parker	(Netherlands) FC Twente	(South Africa) Kaizer Chiefs	Free
27 July 2011	(Netherlands) Rick ten Voorde	(Netherlands) NEC Nijmegen	(Netherlands) RKC Waalwijk	Loan
27 July 2011	(Netherlands) Piet Velthuizen	(Spain) Hércules CF	(Netherlands) Vitesse Arnhem	Free
29 July 2011	(Slovakia) Michal Mravec	(United States) Sporting Kansas City	(Netherlands) FC Emmen	Free
29 July 2011	(Netherlands) Elson do Almeida	(Netherlands) Jong Utrecht	(Netherlands) FC Emmen	Free
29 July 2011	(Netherlands) Delano van Crooy	(Netherlands) VVV-Venlo	(Netherlands) FC Zwolle	Free
29 July 2011	(North Macedonia) Antonio Stankov	(Netherlands) Roda JC	(Netherlands) FC Oss	Loan
29 July 2011	(Norway) Erik Midtgarden	(Norway) Odd Grenland	(Netherlands) Vitesse Arnhem	Free
29 July 2011	(Norway) Erik Midtgarden	(Netherlands) Vitesse Arnhem	(Estonia) FC Flora	Loan
30 July 2011	(Netherlands) Jason Oost	(Belgium) KVSK United	(Netherlands) Excelsior Rotterdam	Free
30 July 2011	(Belgium) Thomas De Corte	(Belgium) Royal Antwerp FC	(Netherlands) AGOVV	Free
30 July 2011	(Greece) Michael Vakalopoulos	(Netherlands) AGOVV	(Netherlands) Vitesse Arnhem	Loan Return
30 July 2011	(Finland) Joonas Kolkka	(Netherlands) NAC Breda	(Netherlands) Willem II Tilburg	Free
31 July 2011	(Norway) Abdisalam Ibrahim	(England) Manchester City	(Netherlands) NEC Nijmegen	Loan
1 August 2011	(Morocco) Ahmed Ahahaoui	(Netherlands) VVV-Venlo	(Netherlands) FC Volendam	Free
1 August 2011	(Australia) Andrew Marveggio	(Australia) Adelaide City	(Netherlands) Telstar	Free
1 August 2011	(Australia) Ryan Marveggio	(Australia) Adelaide City	(Netherlands) Telstar	Free
1 August 2011	(Netherlands) Mohamed El Makrini	(Netherlands) FC Den Bosch	(Netherlands) SC Cambuur	Free
1 August 2011	(Netherlands) Lorenzo Piqué	(Netherlands) ADO Den Haag	(Netherlands) FC Volendam	Free
1 August 2011	(Netherlands) Maarten Stekelenburg	(Netherlands) AFC Ajax	(Italy) AS Roma	€6.3M
1 August 2011	(Netherlands) Adil Auassar	(Netherlands) Feyenoord	(Netherlands) RKC Waalwijk	Loan
1 August 2011	(Netherlands) Mitchell Piqué	(Netherlands) ADO Den Haag	(Netherlands) Willem II Tilburg	Free
2 August 2011	(Paraguay) Roberto Fernandez	(Paraguay) Cerro Porteño	(Netherlands) FC Utrecht	Loan
2 August 2011	(Netherlands) Joost Broerse	(Cyprus) APOEL Nicosia	(Netherlands) Excelsior Rotterdam	Free
2 August 2011	(Netherlands) Marnix Kolder	(Netherlands) VVV-Venlo	(Netherlands) Go Ahead Eagles	Free
2 August 2011	(Finland) Niklas Tarvajärvi	(Germany) Karlsruher SC	(Netherlands) Go Ahead Eagles	Free
2 August 2011	(Hungary) Andras Simon	(Netherlands) Excelsior Rotterdam	(Hungary) Győri ETO FC	Free
3 August 2011	(Bosnia and Herzegovina) Adnan Sečerović	(Netherlands) Roda JC	(Netherlands) Fortuna Sittard	Loan
3 August 2011	(Netherlands) Nicky Hofs	(Cyprus) AEL Limassol	(Netherlands) Vitesse Arnhem	Free
3 August 2011	(Belgium) Yves De Winter	(Belgium) KVC Westerlo	(Netherlands) De Graafschap	Undisclosed
3 August 2011	(Netherlands) Shkodran Metaj	(Netherlands) FC Groningen	(Netherlands) FC Emmen	Loan
4 August 2011	(Netherlands) Jeroen Ketting	(Belgium) KVSK United	(Netherlands) FC Zwolle	Free
4 August 2011	(Nigeria) Oluwafemi Ajilore	(Netherlands) FC Groningen	(Denmark) Brøndby IF	Loan
4 August 2011	(Netherlands) Renee Troost	(Netherlands) Almere City FC	(Netherlands) AGOVV	Non-contract
4 August 2011	(Nigeria) Uche Nwofor	(Nigeria) Enugu Rangers	(Netherlands) VVV-Venlo	Undisclosed
5 August 2011	(Netherlands) Geoffrey Castillion	(Netherlands) AFC Ajax	(Netherlands) RKC Waalwijk	Loan
5 August 2011	(Netherlands) Jahmill Flu	(Netherlands) RBC Roosendaal	(Netherlands) FC Volendam	Free
5 August 2011	(Italy) Andrea Mei	(Italy) Inter Milan	(Netherlands) VVV-Venlo	Loan
7 August 2011	(Netherlands) Marijn Sterk	(Netherlands) FC Volendam	(Netherlands) FC Emmen	Free
7 August 2011	(Israel) Dan Roman	(Israel) Hapoel Ramat Gan	(Netherlands) SC Veendam	Free
8 August 2011	(Czech Republic) Vojtech Schulmeister	(Slovakia) FC Nitra	(Netherlands) FC Eindhoven	Free
9 August 2011	(Georgia (country)) Valeri Kazaishvili	(Georgia (country)) Sioni Bolnisi	(Netherlands) Vitesse Arnhem	Undisclosed
10 August 2011	(Netherlands) Michel Vorm	(Netherlands) FC Utrecht	(England) Swansea City	€1.7M
11 August 2011	(Belgium) Alandson Jansen da Silva	(Belgium) AFC Tubize	(Netherlands) AGOVV	Non-contract
11 August 2011	(Netherlands) Rob van Dijk	(Netherlands) Feyenoord	(Netherlands) FC Utrecht	Free
11 August 2011	(Slovakia) Zdenko Kapralik	(Slovakia) Spartak Trnava	(Netherlands) FC Oss	Free
11 August 2011	(Germany) Christopher Bieber	(Germany) Karlsruher SC	(Netherlands) FC Oss	Free
11 August 2011	(Guadeloupe) Matthieu Bemba	(Cyprus) Ermis Aradippou	(Netherlands) FC Emmen	Free
12 August 2011	(Ghana) Kelvin Bossman	(Netherlands) FC Groningen	(Netherlands) Helmond Sport	Free
15 August 2011	(Belgium) Timothy Derijck	(Netherlands) ADO Den Haag	(Netherlands) PSV Eindhoven	€750K
16 August 2011	(Netherlands) Roy Beerens	(Netherlands) SC Heerenveen	(Netherlands) AZ Alkmaar	€1.6M
16 August 2011	(Poland) Przemyslaw Tyton	(Netherlands) Roda JC	(Netherlands) PSV Eindhoven	Loan
17 August 2011	(Poland) Mikolaj Lebedynski	(Poland) Pogon Szczecin	(Netherlands) Roda JC	Loan
17 August 2011	(Netherlands) Evander Sno	(Netherlands) AFC Ajax	(Netherlands) RKC Waalwijk	Free
17 August 2011	(Netherlands) Calvin Jong-a-Pin	(Netherlands) SC Heerenveen	(Japan) Shimizu S-Pulse	Free
17 August 2011	(Netherlands) Dennis van der Ree	(Netherlands) SC Cambuur	(Netherlands) SC Veendam	Non-contract
18 August 2011	(Netherlands) Donny Rijnink	(Netherlands) Almere City FC	(Netherlands) Telstar	Free
18 August 2011	(Netherlands) Jan-Arie van der Heijden	(Netherlands) AFC Ajax	(Netherlands) Vitesse Arnhem	€300K
18 August 2011	(Serbia) Nenad Sreckovic	(Serbia) FK Napredak Kruševac	(Netherlands) De Graafschap	Free
19 August 2011	(Netherlands) Ramon Zomer	(Netherlands) NEC Nijmegen	(Netherlands) SC Heerenveen	€650K
19 August 2011	(Morocco) Ilias Haddad	(Netherlands) AZ Alkmaar	(Scotland) St Mirren	Free
20 August 2011	(Netherlands) Rodney Sneijder	(Netherlands) AFC Ajax	(Netherlands) FC Utrecht	Loan
22 August 2011	(Argentina) Sergio Romero	(Netherlands) AZ Alkmaar	(Italy) Sampdoria	€3.5M
22 August 2011	(Netherlands) Ronald Graafland	(Netherlands) AFC Ajax	(Netherlands) Feyenoord	Free
22 August 2011	(Czech Republic) Tomas Kalas	(England) Chelsea FC	(Netherlands) Vitesse Arnhem	Loan
22 August 2011	(Ghana) Anthony Annan	(Germany) FC Schalke	(Netherlands) Vitesse Arnhem	Loan
23 August 2011	(Hungary) Márton Eppel	(Hungary) MTK Budapest	(Netherlands) NEC Nijmegen	Free
24 August 2011	(Netherlands) Maarten Boddaert	(Netherlands) RBC Roosendaal	(Netherlands) FC Den Bosch	Free
24 August 2011	(Netherlands) Gersom Klok	(Netherlands) Go Ahead Eagles	(Netherlands) HHC Hardenberg	Free
25 August 2011	(Suriname) Touvarno Pinas	(Netherlands) Almere City FC	(Israel) Maccabi Netanya	Free
25 August 2011	(Netherlands) Daan Bovenberg	(Netherlands) Excelsior Rotterdam	(Netherlands) FC Utrecht	Undisclosed
25 August 2011	(Netherlands) Kevin Tano	(Netherlands) FC Volendam	(Netherlands) ADO Den Haag	Free
25 August 2011	(Netherlands) Kevin Tano	(Netherlands) ADO Den Haag	(Netherlands) FC Dordrecht	Loan
26 August 2011	(Netherlands) Iwan Redan	(Netherlands) Almere City FC	(Netherlands) SC Feijenoord	Free
26 August 2011	(England) Mark Redshaw	(Iceland) Fram Reykjavik	(Netherlands) FC Oss	Free
26 August 2011	(Belgium) Vincent Van Trier	(Cyprus) Chalkanoras Idaliou	(Netherlands) FC Oss	Free
26 August 2011	(North Macedonia) Yani Urdinov	(Netherlands) Roda JC	(North Macedonia) Rabotnicki Skopje	Free
27 August 2011	(Netherlands) Jasper Cillessen	(Netherlands) NEC Nijmegen	(Netherlands) AFC Ajax	€3.2M
29 August 2011	(Netherlands) Cees Paauwe	(Netherlands) Excelsior Rotterdam	(Netherlands) NEC Nijmegen	Free
29 August 2011	(Hungary) Gábor Horváth	(Hungary) Videoton FC	(Netherlands) ADO Den Haag	Free
29 August 2011	(Netherlands) John Verhoek	(France) Stade Rennais	(Netherlands) ADO Den Haag	Loan
30 August 2011	(Mexico) Ulises Dávila	(England) Chelsea FC	(Netherlands) Vitesse Arnhem	Loan
30 August 2011	(Netherlands) Rajiv van la Parra	(France) SM Caen	(Netherlands) SC Heerenveen	Free
30 August 2011	(Netherlands) Juanito Sequeira	(Netherlands) FC Dordrecht	(Netherlands) Helmond Sport	Free
30 August 2011	(Netherlands) Bob Schepers	(Netherlands) SC Cambuur	(Netherlands) FC Utrecht	Undisclosed
30 August 2011	(Netherlands) Bob Schepers	(Netherlands) FC Utrecht	(Netherlands) SC Cambuur	Loan
30 August 2011	(Denmark) Kevin Conboy	(Denmark) Esbjerg fB	(Netherlands) NEC Nijmegen	Undisclosed
30 August 2011	(Netherlands) Hans Denissen	(Netherlands) FC Emmen	(Netherlands) Willem II Tilburg	Free
31 August 2011	(Netherlands) André Krul	(Netherlands) FC Utrecht	(Netherlands) AGOVV	Loan
31 August 2011	(Russia) Dmitri Bulykin	(Belgium) RSC Anderlecht	(Netherlands) AFC Ajax	Free
31 August 2011	(Poland) Pawel Kieszek	(Portugal) FC Porto	(Netherlands) Roda JC	Loan
31 August 2011	(Slovenia) Mitja Mörec	(Denmark) Lyngby BK	(Netherlands) ADO Den Haag	Free
31 August 2011	(Netherlands) Tom Beugelsdijk	(Netherlands) ADO Den Haag	(Netherlands) FC Dordrecht	Loan
31 August 2011	(Netherlands) Donny van der Dussen	(Netherlands) ADO Den Haag	(Netherlands) FC Dordrecht	Free
31 August 2011	(Netherlands) Cerilio Cijntje	(Netherlands) Jong Ajax	(Netherlands) Telstar	Free
31 August 2011	(Netherlands) Gerson Sheotahul	(Netherlands) Willem II Tilburg	(Netherlands) Telstar	Loan
31 August 2011	(England) Steven Irwin	(England) Liverpool F.C.	(Netherlands) Telstar	Free
31 August 2011	(Netherlands) Otman Bakkal	(Netherlands) PSV Eindhoven	(Netherlands) Feyenoord	Loan
31 August 2011	(Finland) Juha Hakola	(Netherlands) Willem II Tilburg	(Hungary) Ferencvárosi TC	Free
31 August 2011	(Netherlands) Género Zeefuik	(Netherlands) PSV Eindhoven	(Netherlands) NEC Nijmegen	Loan
31 August 2011	(Netherlands) Jetro Willems	(Netherlands) Sparta Rotterdam	(Netherlands) PSV Eindhoven	Undisclosed
31 August 2011	(Netherlands) Jeremy Bokila	(Belgium) Zulte Waregem	(Netherlands) Sparta Rotterdam	Loan
31 August 2011	(Sweden) John Guidetti	(England) Manchester City	(Netherlands) Feyenoord	Loan
31 August 2011	(Slovenia) Tim Matavz	(Netherlands) FC Groningen	(Netherlands) PSV Eindhoven	€7M
31 August 2011	(Uruguay) David Texeira	(Uruguay) Defensor Sporting	(Netherlands) FC Groningen	€1.45M
31 August 2011	(Sweden) Robin Eriksson	(Netherlands) SC Heerenveen	(Sweden) BK Häcken	Loan
31 August 2011	(Netherlands) Leroy Fer	(Netherlands) Feyenoord	(Netherlands) FC Twente	€5.5
31 August 2011	(Greece) Giorgos Niklitsiotis	(Greece) Olympiacos	(Netherlands) Helmond Sport	Loan
31 August 2011	(Hungary) Krisztián Vadócz	(Spain) Osasuna	(Netherlands) NEC Nijmegen	Free
31 August 2011	(Netherlands) Junior Livramento	(Netherlands) Willem II Tilburg	(Netherlands) AGOVV	Loan
31 August 2011	(Brazil) Alex Titton	(Brazil) Nacional Futebol Clube	(Netherlands) AGOVV	Non-contract
31 August 2011	(Netherlands) Rob van der Sluijs	(Netherlands) FC Eindhoven	(Netherlands) AGOVV	Non-contract
31 August 2011	(Belgium) Mpania Kalenga	(Belgium) R.R.C. Peruwelz	(Netherlands) AGOVV	Non-contract
31 August 2011	(Sweden) Erton Fejzullahu	(Netherlands) NEC Nijmegen	(Sweden) Mjällby AIF	Loan
31 August 2011	(Belgium) Rheda Djellal	(Belgium) RSC Anderlecht	(Netherlands) Excelsior Rotterdam	Loan
31 August 2011	(Estonia) Raio Piiroja	(Norway) Fredrikstad FK	(Netherlands) Vitesse Arnhem	Undisclosed
31 August 2011	(Belgium) Antonio Caramazza	(Belgium) CS Visé	(Netherlands) MVV	Free
31 August 2011	(Morocco) Youness Mokhtar	(Netherlands) PSV Eindhoven	(Netherlands) FC Eindhoven	Loan
31 August 2011	(Greece) Georgios Pitharoulis	(Greece) Panachaiki	(Netherlands) Helmond Sport	Free
31 August 2011	(Hungary) Boldizsár Bodor	(Netherlands) Roda JC	(Greece) OFI	Free
31 August 2011	(Netherlands) Rachid Ofrany	(Netherlands) VVV-Venlo	(Netherlands) Fortuna Sittard	Free
31 August 2011	(Costa Rica) Bryan Ruiz	(Netherlands) FC Twente	(England) Fulham FC	€12M
31 August 2011	(Netherlands) Christiaan Cicek	(Netherlands) Excelsior '31	(Netherlands) FC Zwolle	€23K
31 August 2011	(Turkey) Serhat Köksal	(Netherlands) FC Dordrecht	(Netherlands) ADO Den Haag	Loan return
31 August 2011	(Spain) Jordi López	(Netherlands) Vitesse Arnhem	(Greece) OFI	Free

== See also ==
- Football in the Netherlands
- Transfer window
