= Nuytinck =

Nuytinck is a surname. Notable people with the surname include:

- Bram Nuytinck (born 1990), Dutch footballer
- Cedric Nuytinck (born 1993), Belgian table tennis player
- Erwin Nuytinck (born 1994), Dutch footballer
