= Maikey Houwaart =

Dutch association footballer (born 2006)

Personal information
- Date of birth: 27 January 2006 (age 20)
- Height: 1.82 m (6 ft 0 in)
- Position: Forward

Youth career
- -2013: VELO
- 2013-2023: ADO Den Haag

Senior career*
Years	Team	Apps	(Gls)
2023–2026	ADO Den Haag	8	(0)
2025	→ Excelsior Maassluis (loan)	15	(0)
- * Club domestic league appearances and goals as of 24 April 2026

Maikey Houwaart (born 27 January 2006) is a Dutch professional footballer who plays as a forward.

== Career ==
Houwaart began his career with VELO in Wateringen then moved to ADO Den Haag, turning professional in September 2022 on a contract until 2025. In January 2024, he stopped his carpentry training to join a first-team training camp.

In August 2025, it was announced that he signed a one-year contract extension at ADO Den Haag and would be loaned out to Excelsior Maassluis for the remainder of the season. On 31 December 2025, it was announced that his loan would be terminated early and he would return to ADO Den Haag.

On 30 June 2026 his contract with ADO Den Haag ended, making him a free agent.
