= Cijntje =

Cijntje is a Dutch surname. Notable people with this surname include:

- Angelo Cijntje (born 1980), Curaçaoan footballer
- Cerilio Cijntje (born 1992), Dutch footballer
- Jeremy Cijntje (born 1998), Dutch-Curaçaoan footballer
- Jurrangelo Cijntje (born 2003), Dutch-born Curaçaoan baseball player
- Sherwin Cijntje (born 1964), Curaçaoan baseball player
