= Gino Coutinho =

Dutch footballer (born 1982)

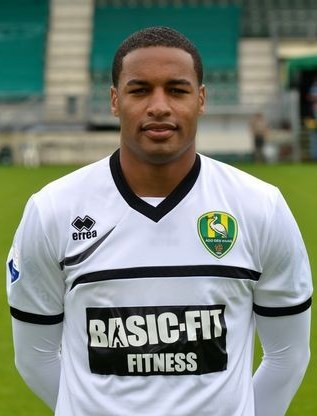

Personal information
- Date of birth: 5 August 1982 (age 44)
- Place of birth: 's-Hertogenbosch, Netherlands
- Height: 1.82 m (6 ft 0 in)
- Position: Goalkeeper

Youth career
- Real Lunet
- PSV

Senior career*
| Years | Team | Apps | (Gls) |
| 2000–2003 | PSV | 4 | (0) |
| 2002–2003 | → Den Bosch (loan) | 0 | (0) |
| 2003–2004 | NAC | 3 | (0) |
| 2004–2006 | Vitesse | 2 | (0) |
| 2006–2008 | Den Bosch | 13 | (0) |
| 2008–2014 | ADO Den Haag | 125 | (0) |
| 2014–2015 | Excelsior | 19 | (0) |
| 2015–2018 | AZ | 11 | (0) |
| 2017–2018 | Jong AZ | 1 | (0) |
| 2018 | NEC | 2 | (0) |
| 2019–2021 | Sparta Nijkerk | 18 | (0) |
| Total | | 198 | (0) |

International career
| 2001 | Netherlands U20 | 5 | (0) |
| 2002–2003 | Netherlands U21 | 4 | (0) |
- * Club domestic league appearances and goals as of 25 June 2018

Gino Coutinho (born 5 August 1982) is a Dutch former footballer, who played as a goalkeeper.

== Club career ==
=== PSV Eindhoven ===
Coutinho played for SV Real Lunet before he was discovered by PSV. In the 2000–01 season, Coutinho played four times for PSV. During the 2001–02 season, Coutinho failed to make an appearance for PSV, so he was loaned out to Den Bosch for the following campaign.

Coutinho has also played for NAC, Vitesse and ADO Den Haag in the Dutch Eredivisie. Only at Den Haag in the 2010/2011 season did he claim a regular place in the starting line-up, mainly because of injury to the first-choice goalkeeper Robert Zwinkels. He left them to join Excelsior in September 2014 and moved to AZ on a free in summer 2015. In 2018, he joined second-tier NEC from AZ.

== International career ==
He was capped by the Netherlands in the 2001 FIFA World Youth Championship in Argentina and played 4 games for the Netherlands national under-21 football team.

== Personal life ==
Coutinho was arrested in 2009 and spent two weeks in prison after over 4,000 cannabis plants were found on his premises. He was sentenced to 240 hours of community service and a six-months suspended prison sentence for cannabis cultivation and money laundering in 2011. Both parties appealed and returned to court.

In December 2012, the District Attorney withdrew the appeal and Coutinho was acquitted of all charges.

== Honours ==
=== Club ===
PSV

- Eredivisie: 2000–01
