= Lorenzo Piqué =

Dutch footballer (born 1990)

Personal information
- Date of birth: 17 September 1990 (age 36)
- Place of birth: Rotterdam, Netherlands
- Height: 1.84 m (6 ft 0 in)
- Position: Centre-back

Team information
- Current team: Kozakken Boys
- Number: 4

Youth career
- Alexandria '66
- Feyenoord

Senior career*
Years	Team	Apps	(Gls)
2009–2011	ADO Den Haag	13	(0)
2011–2012	Volendam	15	(0)
2012	ASWH	0	(0)
2012–2023	TOP Oss	313	(4)
2023–	Kozakken Boys	30	(0)
- * Club domestic league appearances and goals as of 09:46, 2 June 2024 (UTC)

Lorenzo Piqué (born 17 September 1990) is a Dutch professional footballer who plays as a centre-back for Tweede Divisie club Kozakken Boys.

== Club career ==
In his youth, Piqué played for Feyenoord, but never made his debut. He played most of his games for the reserve team, Jong Feyenoord.

In 2009, Piqué was transferred to ADO Den Haag, where he signed a contract until the summer of 2010. Because of the injury of his cousin, Mitchell Piqué, he played many friendly games in the pre-season as left-back. He made his debut in the 3–0 loss to Ajax on 27 September due to an injury of Ahmed Ammi.

In the 2010–11 season, Piqué mainly played in the reserve team of ADO, partly due to depth and competition at the centre back position from the likes of Ramon Leeuwin and Christian Supusepa.

On 1 August 2011, Piqué moved to FC Volendam, where he signed a one-year deal. In September 2012, he initially moved to fifth-tier Hoofdklasse club ASWH, but the Royal Dutch Football Association (KNVB) declared him ineligible to play, which meant that Piqué could only practice until receiving a playing license in the winter break. Therefore, he decided to trial with FC Oss, where he eventually signed a contract on 17 October 2012, until the end of the 2012–13 season.

Piqué left Oss in June 2018, but returned in January 2019 after not finding a new club during the summer transfer window. The club had at that point changed its name to TOP Oss. After the 2019–20 Eerste Divisie season, Piqué had made 221 league appearances for the club, in which he scored four goals.

On 7 October 2022, Piqué, alongside teammate Rick Stuy van den Herik, reached 300 appearances for TOP Oss. On 17 February 2023, he surpassed Raymond Koopman's record to reach a club record of 315 appearances. In May 2023, the club decided not to extend his expiring contract, ending his tenure with TOP Oss. Piqué at his departure held the lone record for TOP Oss with his 327 club appearances.

On 12 July 2023, Piqué signed a two-year contract with a third-tier Tweede Divisie side Kozakken Boys.

== Personal life ==
Born in the Netherlands, Piqué is of Surinamese descent.
