= Bogdan Milić =

Montenegrin footballer

Bogdan Milić Богдан Милић
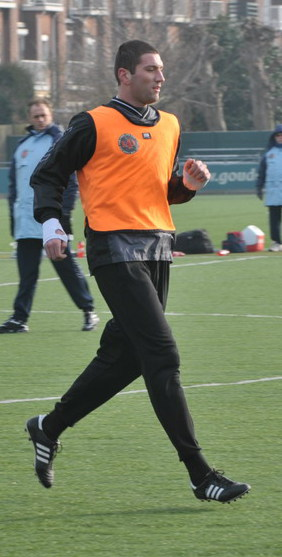

Personal information
- Date of birth: 24 November 1987 (age 38)
- Place of birth: Podgorica, Montenegro
- Height: 2.02 m (6 ft 8 in)
- Position: Striker

Team information
- Current team: Zabjelo
- Number: 99

Youth career
- 2000–2004: Mladost Podgorica

Senior career*
Years	Team	Apps	(Gls)
2004–2008	Budućnost	49	(23)
2008–2010	ADO Den Haag	39	(15)
2010	Krylia Sovetov	0	(0)
2010	Viktoria Plzeň	1	(0)
2011	Spartak Nalchik	15	(10)
2012	Gwangju	36	(15)
2013	Suwon	28	(14)
2014	Rudar Pljevlja	11	(7)
2014–2015	Mladost Podgorica	33	(15)
2015–2016	Osasuna	5	(2)
2016	Terengganu FA	9	(8)
2017	Saipa	9	(5)
2017–2022	Iskra	115	(30)
2022–2023	Andijon	25	(9)
2023–2025	Mladost Donja Gorica	59	(8)
2026—	Zabjelo	5	(1)

International career
- Montenegro U21
- * Club domestic league appearances and goals

Bogdan Milić (Serbian Cyrillic: Богдан Милић, born 24 November 1987) is a Montenegrin footballer who plays as a striker for Zabjelo.

== Club career ==
Born in Titograd, Milić was a FK Mladost Podgorica youth graduate, but made his senior debuts with FK Budućnost Podgorica, aged only 17. After scoring nine goals during the 2007–08 campaign, he moved to Eredivisie club ADO Den Haag. He is part of the Kuči clan.

A big striker, Milić made his Eredivisie debut on 31 August 2008, coming on as a late substitute for Leroy Resodihardjo in a 5–2 away win against Sparta Rotterdam. He scored his first goal for the club roughly a year later, netting the first in a 3–1 win at Vitesse Arnhem.

In June 2010 Milić signed for FC Krylia Sovetov Samara, after impressing on a trial. In August, however, he was released, after being deemed surplus to requirements by new manager's Yuri Gazzaev, and subsequently joined FC Viktoria Plzeň.

In March 2011 Milić moved to PFC Spartak Nalchik, after appearing rarely with Viktoria. After a two-year spell in South Korea with Gwangju FC and Suwon FC he returned to his native country, signing for FK Rudar Pljevlja.

In the 2014 summer Milić returned to his first club Mladost Podgorica, netting a career-best 12 goals during the season. With Mladost he won 2014/2015 Montenegrin Cup. On 30 July 2015 he joined Spanish Segunda División side CA Osasuna.

In a debut for Terengganu F.A Milic scored first goal against Melaka F.A in Malaysia Cup group stage, but their team lost to Melaka F.A 2-1
