= Aleksandar Radosavljević (footballer, born 1979) =

Slovenian footballer (born 1979)

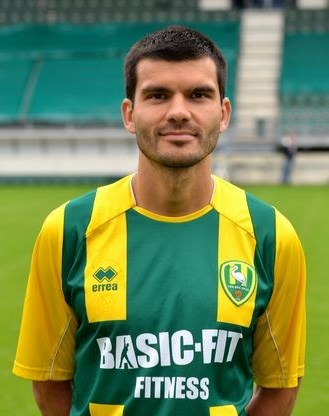
- Radosavljević with ADO Den Haag in 2012

Personal information
- Date of birth: 25 April 1979 (age 47)
- Place of birth: Kranj, SR Slovenia, SFR Yugoslavia
- Height: 1.80 m (5 ft 11 in)
- Positions: Defensive midfielder; defender

Youth career
- Triglav Kranj

Senior career*
Years	Team	Apps	(Gls)
1998–1999	Triglav Kranj	31	(1)
1999–2002	Celje	82	(21)
2002–2007	Shinnik Yaroslavl	70	(0)
2003–2004	→ Mura (loan)	23	(7)
2007–2009	Tom Tomsk	60	(4)
2010	AEL	7	(0)
2010–2013	ADO Den Haag	53	(4)
2012–2013	→ VVV-Venlo (loan)	27	(1)
2013	Olimpija Ljubljana	8	(0)
Total		361	(38)

International career
1997	Slovenia U18	2	(0)
1998	Slovenia U20	2	(0)
1999–2001	Slovenia U21	15	(3)
2002–2013	Slovenia	39	(1)
2003	Slovenia B	1	(0)

Managerial career
- 2019: Slovenia U17
- 2019–2021: Slovenia U15/U16
- 2021–2022: Slovenia U17
- 2022–2023: Slovenia U16
- 2023: Slovenia U17
- 2023–2024: Koper
- * Club domestic league appearances and goals

Aleksandar Radosavljević (born 25 April 1979) is a Slovenian football coach and former player who played as a midfielder.

Radosavljević was a member of the Slovenia national team, and represented the nation at the 2010 FIFA World Cup.

== Club career ==
In August 2010, Radosavljević was signed by Dutch Eredivisie team ADO Den Haag. In summer 2011, he signed a contract until the 2012–13 season. He was loaned to VVV-Venlo, and released after the 2012–13 season.

== Career statistics ==
=== International ===
Scores and results list Slovenia's goal tally first, score column indicates score after each Radosavljević goal.

List of international goals scored by Aleksandar Radosavljević
No.	Date	Venue	Opponent	Score	Result	Competition
1	12 August 2009	Ljudski vrt, Maribor, Slovenia	San Marino	2–0	5–0	2010 FIFA World Cup qualification
