= SV VELO =

Dutch omnisports club

Coordinates: 52°1′53.91″N 4°16′26.8″E

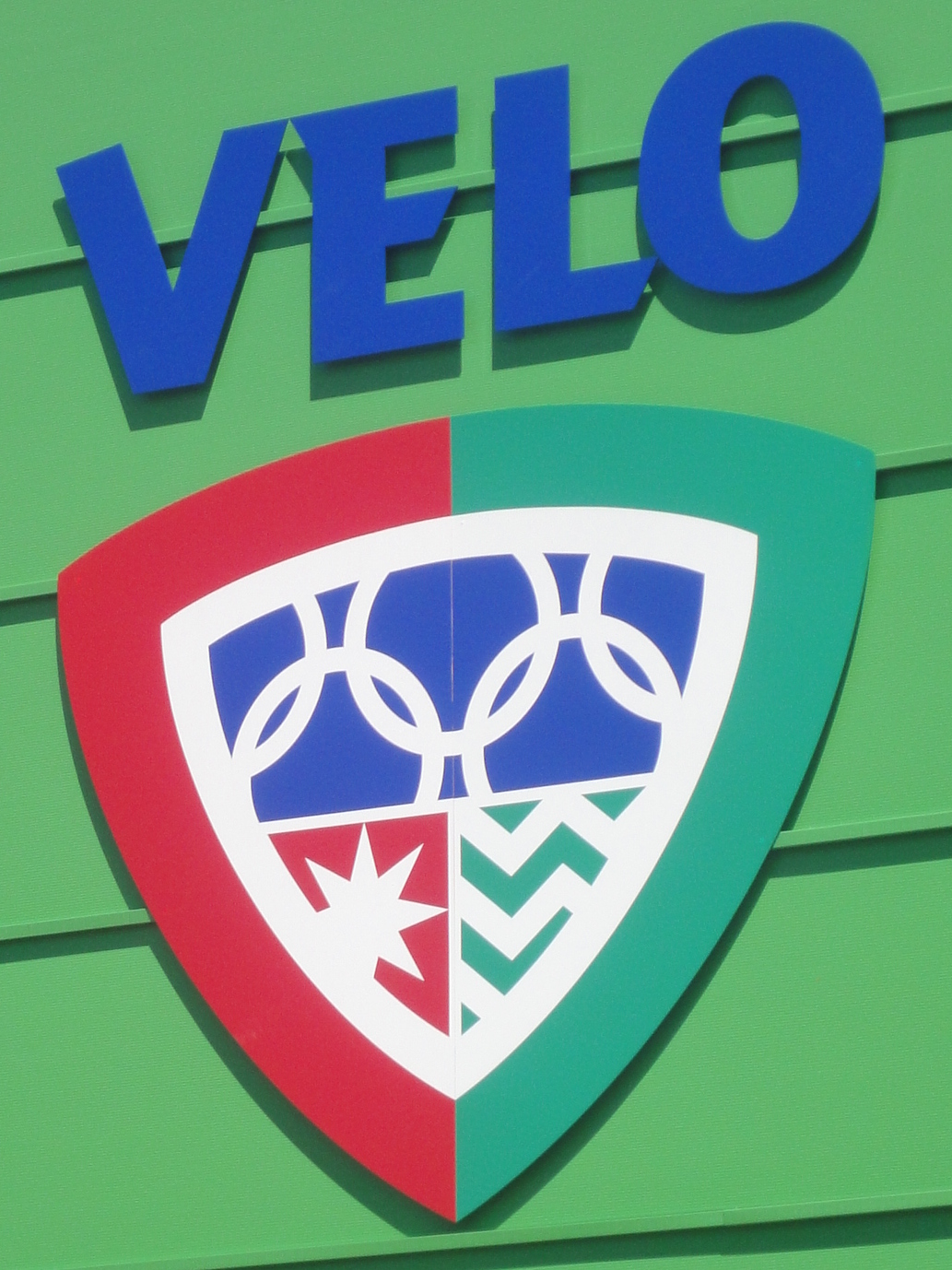
- Full name: Sportvereniging Verdedig en Loop Op
- Founded: July 14, 1930; 95 years ago

SV VELO (short for Sportvereniging Verdedig en Loop Op) is an omnisports club from Wateringen, Netherlands. It has branches for handball, badminton, volleyball, football, checkers, boules, road cycling, and martial arts. The first squad football plays in the Eerste Klasse. The badminton division is a leading badminton club in Europe.

== History ==
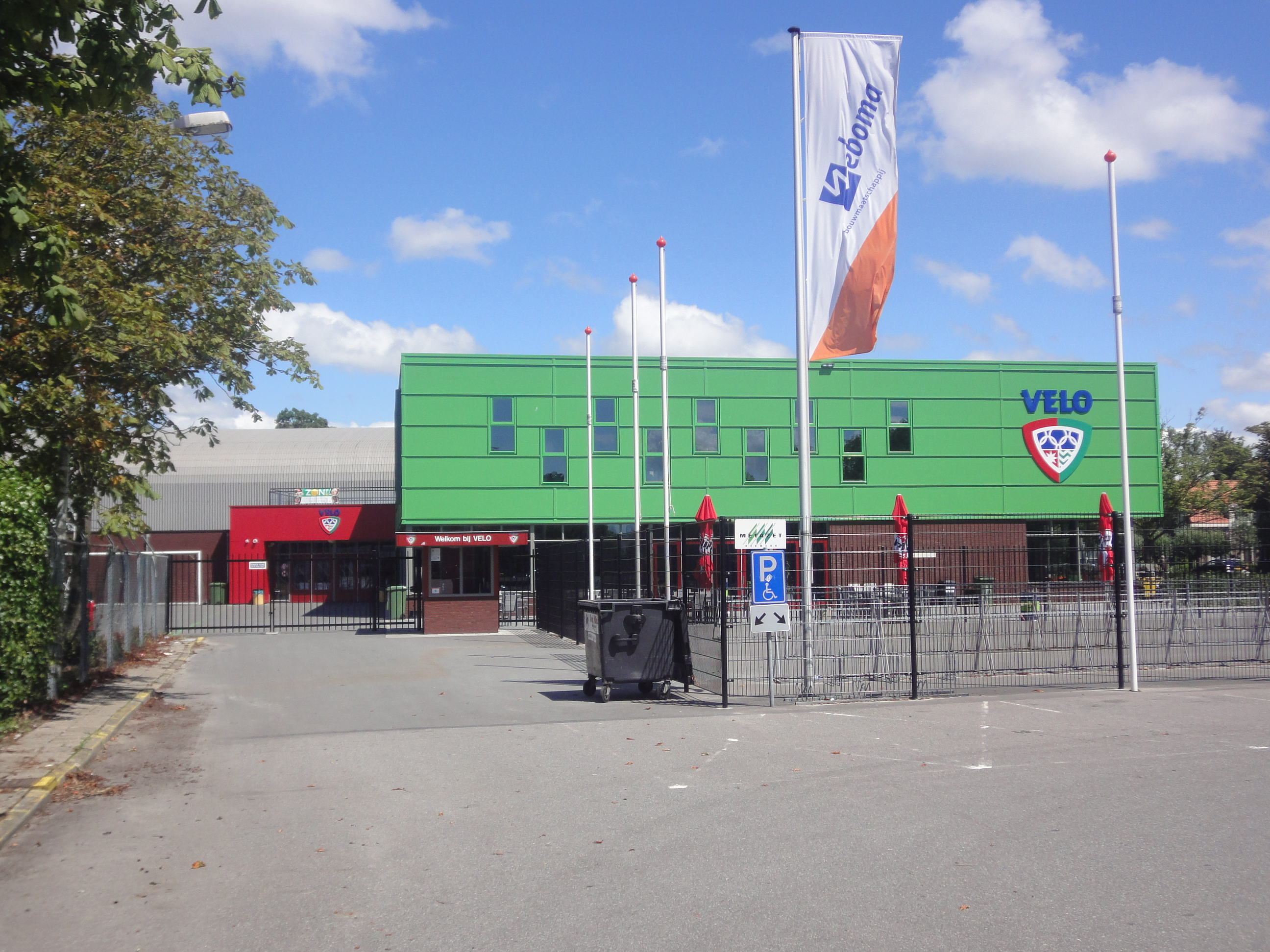
VELO club building

SV VELO was founded on 14 July 1930 as a football club. In 1949, the handball branch was added. In 1960, martial arts was started, in 1966 badminton, in 1972 volleyball, and in 1974 road cycling. In 1991, a boules branch was founded. In 2014, VELO badminton became for the tenth time national champions in badminton.

== Notable players ==
- Mia Audina – badminton
- Rachel van Cutsen – badminton
- Jeroen van Dijk – badminton
- Astrid van der Knaap – badminton
- Rune Massing – badminton
- Jim Middelburg – badminton
- Dicky Palyama – badminton
- Alex Vlaar – badminton
- Robert Zwinkels – goalkeeper ADO Den Haag

== Externe link ==
- Official website
