= Raily Ignacio =

Curaçaoan footballer (born 1987)

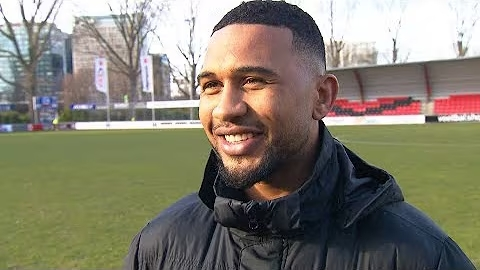

Personal information
- Date of birth: 4 June 1987 (age 39)
- Place of birth: The Hague, Netherlands
- Height: 1.80 m (5 ft 11 in)
- Position: Forward

Youth career
- Oranjeplein

Senior career*
Years	Team	Apps	(Gls)
2007–2008	HMSH		
2008–2009	Westlandia	5	(0)
2009–2011	ADO Den Haag	5	(0)
2010	→ Dordrecht (loan)	8	(1)
2011–2013	Spakenburg	51	(21)
2013–2016	Rijnsburgse Boys	76	(65)
2016–2017	Kozakken Boys	39	(20)
2018–2023	AFC	154	(97)
2024–2025	Kozakken Boys	46	(26)
2025	Scheveningen	16	(11)
2026	IJsselmeervogels	16	(4)
Total		416	(245)
- * Club domestic league appearances and goals as of 22:37, 11 December 2025 (UTC)

Raily Ignacio (born 4 June 1987) is a Curaçaoan retired footballer who played as a forward.

== Career ==
=== Club ===
He played previously for ADO Den Haag in the Dutch Eredivisie and joined in summer 2011 to SV Spakenburg. He later played for several amateur clubs, including AFC for whom he scored a stunning 99 goals in 160 games, and Kozakken Boys.

In January 2026, Ignacio left Scheveningen for fellow amateur side IJsselmeervogels, only to rerire at the end of the season.

=== International ===
Ignacio was a Curaçaoan substitute in two 2014 FIFA World Cup qualification (CONCACAF) qualifier matches against Antigua and Barbuda on 2 and 6 September against Haiti.
