= Pepijn Veerman =

Dutch footballer (born 1992)

Personal information
- Date of birth: 6 March 1992 (age 34)
- Place of birth: Roosendaal, Netherlands
- Height: 1.88 m (6 ft 2 in)
- Position: Striker

Youth career
- RSC Alliance
- RKVV Roosendaal
- RBC Roosendaal

Senior career*
Years	Team	Apps	(Gls)
2010–2011	RBC Roosendaal	24	(2)
2011–2013	Helmond Sport	16	(1)
2013–2018	AFC		
2018–2019	Swift		
- * Club domestic league appearances and goals

Pepijn Veerman (born 6 March 1992) is a Dutch former professional footballer who played as a striker. He formerly played for RBC Roosendaal and Helmond Sport.

== Career ==
Veerman played in the youth departments of RSC Alliance and RKVV Roosendaal before joining the youth academy of RBC Roosendaal. He made his professional debut on 3 September 2010 in the away match against MVV and played a total of 24 matches in which he scored two goals until the club's bankruptcy in June 2011.

On 21 June 2011, Veerman signed a two-year contract with Helmond Sport. He made his debut for the club on the first matchday of the domestic season as a starter in a 3–1 loss to TOP Oss. Due to a series of injuries in the 2012–13 season, he was increasingly sidelined and his contract was not extended.

Veerman retired from professional football in 2013, but continued playing at lower level for AFC while studying political science at the University of Amsterdam. Between 2018 and 2019, he played for Hoofdklasse club Swift.

== After football ==
Following his retirement from professional football, Veerman has worked in public affairs.
