= Joel Tillema =

Dutch footballer (born 1989)

Personal information
- Date of birth: 5 September 1989 (age 37)
- Place of birth: The Hague, Netherlands
- Height: 1.79 m (5 ft 10 in)
- Position: Attacking midfielder

Team information
- Current team: AFC
- Number: 22

Youth career
- Haaglandia
- SV Loosduinen
- RVC Rijswijk
- Ajax
- –2008: ADO Den Haag

Senior career*
Years	Team	Apps	(Gls)
2008–2011	ADO Den Haag	4	(0)
2011–2014	Scheveningen	57	(7)
2014–2015	Spakenburg	24	(2)
2015–2020	Rijnsburgse Boys	139	(65)
2020–	AFC	62	(14)
- * Club domestic league appearances and goals as of 23 October 2024

Joel Tillema (born 5 September 1989) is a Dutch footballer who plays as an attacking midfielder for AFC.

== Career ==
Tillema started playing football at amateur club in his hometown of The Hague before moving to RVC Rijswijk, where he was noticed by talent scouts of Ajax. He ended up in the youth academy of the Amsterdam-based club, but after some time returned to his hometown to play in the youth academy of ADO Den Haag. He made his professional debut on 24 October 2008 as a starter in the 3–1 away match against Heracles Almelo after Ahmed Ammi was forced on the sideline after falling out injured in the warm-up. In the end, Tillema made no more than four appearances in three seasons for ADO Den Haag.

In the summer of 2011, Tillema left for Hoofdklasse club SVV Scheveningen, after which Tillema would also play for SV Spakenburg and Rijnsburgse Boys. In December 2019, it was announced that Tillema would join AFC for the 2020–21 season.
