= Rik Sebens =

Dutch footballer

Personal information
- Date of birth: 21 May 1988 (age 38)
- Place of birth: Leiden, Netherlands
- Position: Attacking midfielder

Senior career*
Years	Team	Apps	(Gls)
2007–2011	De Graafschap	18	(1)
2011–2013	Achilles '29		
- * Club domestic league appearances and goals

Rik Sebens (born 21 May 1988) is a Dutch former professional footballer who played for De Graafschap and Achilles '29.

== Career ==
Sebens began his career with De Graafschap, and extended his contract with the club in June 2010. He scored 1 goal in 18 league games for the club. He later played with Achilles '29.
