= Donny Rijnink =

Dutch footballer (born 1990)

Personal information
- Full name: Donny Rijnink
- Date of birth: 14 April 1990 (age 36)
- Place of birth: Amsterdam, Netherlands
- Height: 1.97 m (6 ft 5 1/2 in)
- Position: Defender

Team information
- Current team: ADO '20
- Number: 23

Youth career
- FCO
- FC Omniworld

Senior career*
Years	Team	Apps	(Gls)
2009–2011	Almere City	30	(1)
2011–2013	Telstar	27	(1)
2013–2015	Katwijk		
2015–2016	Ajax Zaterdag		
2016–	ADO '20		
- * Club domestic league appearances and goals as of 17 March 2014 (UTC)

Donny Rijnink (born 14 April 1990 in Amsterdam) is a Dutch professional footballer who currently plays as a defender for ADO '20 in the Dutch Derde Divisie. He formerly played for Almere City and Telstar.
