= Charlton Vicento =

Curaçaoan footballer

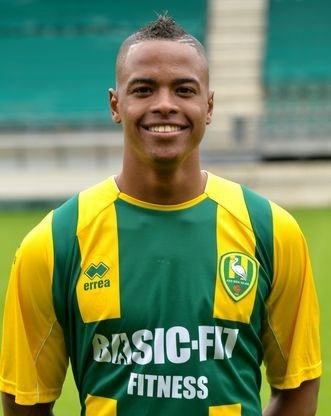

Personal information
- Full name: Charlton Juan Vicento
- Date of birth: 19 January 1991 (age 35)
- Place of birth: Zoetermeer, Netherlands
- Height: 1.81 m (5 ft 11 in)
- Position: Left winger

Team information
- Current team: Victory Boys

Youth career
- RVC Rijswijk
- ADO Den Haag

Senior career*
Years	Team	Apps	(Gls)
2009–2013	ADO Den Haag	90	(15)
2013–2014	PAS Giannina	5	(0)
2014–2015	Willem II	23	(1)
2015–2018	Helmond Sport	34	(3)
2018–2020	Kozakken Boys	39	(10)
2020–2021	SteDoCo	11	(5)
2021–2022	VV Oosterhout		
2025–	Victory Boys		

International career
2009	Netherlands U19	11	(3)
2010	Netherlands U20	2	(0)
2011	Netherlands U21	1	(0)
2014–2018	Curaçao	7	(1)
- * Club domestic league appearances and goals as of 26 January 2026

Charlton Juan Vicento (born 19 January 1991) is a professional footballer who plays as a winger for Victory Boys. Born in Netherlands, he represented for the Curaçao national team

== Club career ==
Vicento made his Eredivisie debut for ADO Den Haag on 15 August 2009, starting in a match against FC Twente at the Den Haag Stadion. His first goal came on 24 October 2009, in a match against Sparta Rotterdam. Vicento made a total of 14 appearances in the Eredivisie for the 2009–10 season, scoring one goal.

== International career ==
=== Youth ===
Vicento represented the Netherlands U-19 team in the qualification rounds for the 2010 UEFA European Under-19 Football Championship. On 14 November 2009, Vicento scored his first goal for the U-19 Oranje in a qualification match against Cyprus.

=== Senior ===
On 30 September 2014, Vicento received his first call ups to the Curaçao national team ahead of the second round of the 2014 Caribbean Cup qualifying series against Martinique, Guadeloupe and St. Vincent and the Grenadines contested on the island of Guadeloupe from 8 to 12 October 2014. He made his first appearance against Martinique on 8 October, scoring the equalizer in the closing minutes of the game.

==== Senior goals ====
Score and Result list Curaçao's goals tally first

No.	Date	Venue	Opponent	Score	Result	Competition	Ref.
1.	1 April 2015	Blakes Estate Stadium, Look Out, Montserrat	Montserrat	2–2	2–2	2018 FIFA World Cup qualification	
2.	6 June 2015	Ergilio Hato Stadium, Willemstad, Curaçao	Trinidad and Tobago	1–0	1–0	Friendly	

== Controversy ==
In March 2011, a video on YouTube showed what appeared to be Vicento bringing a Nazi salute to a celebrating crowd after ADO Den Haag defeated Ajax. Unlike head coach John van den Brom and teammate Lex Immers, Vicento received no penalties for his involvement in the controversial celebration.

== Honours ==
=== Club ===
Willem II

- Eerste Divisie: 2013–14
