= Kai van Hese =

Dutch footballer

- van Hese training with ADO Den Haag in 2009

Personal information
- Date of birth: 16 June 1989 (age 37)
- Place of birth: The Hague, Netherlands
- Position: Left back

Youth career
- Quick
- ADO Den Haag

Senior career*
Years	Team	Apps	(Gls)
2008–2011	ADO Den Haag	26	(0)
2011	→ FC Dordrecht (loan)	11	(0)
2011–2012	Quick		
2012–2014	Noordwijk	31	(3)
2014–2022	Quick		

International career
2009	Netherlands U20	1	(0)
- * Club domestic league appearances and goals

Kai van Hese (born 15 June 1989) is a Dutch retired footballer who played as a left back.

== Club career ==
Van Hese played in the Eredivisie for ADO Den Haag and was loaned to FC Dordrecht in 2011. Bulgarian side Ludogorets was reported to be interested but he returned to childhood club Quick. In 2012, van Hese joined Noordwijk. He rejoined Quick again two years later and went on to play over 200 official games for the club.

== International career ==
Van Hese was capped once by the Netherlands national under-20 football team
