= Wesley Verhoek =

Dutch footballer

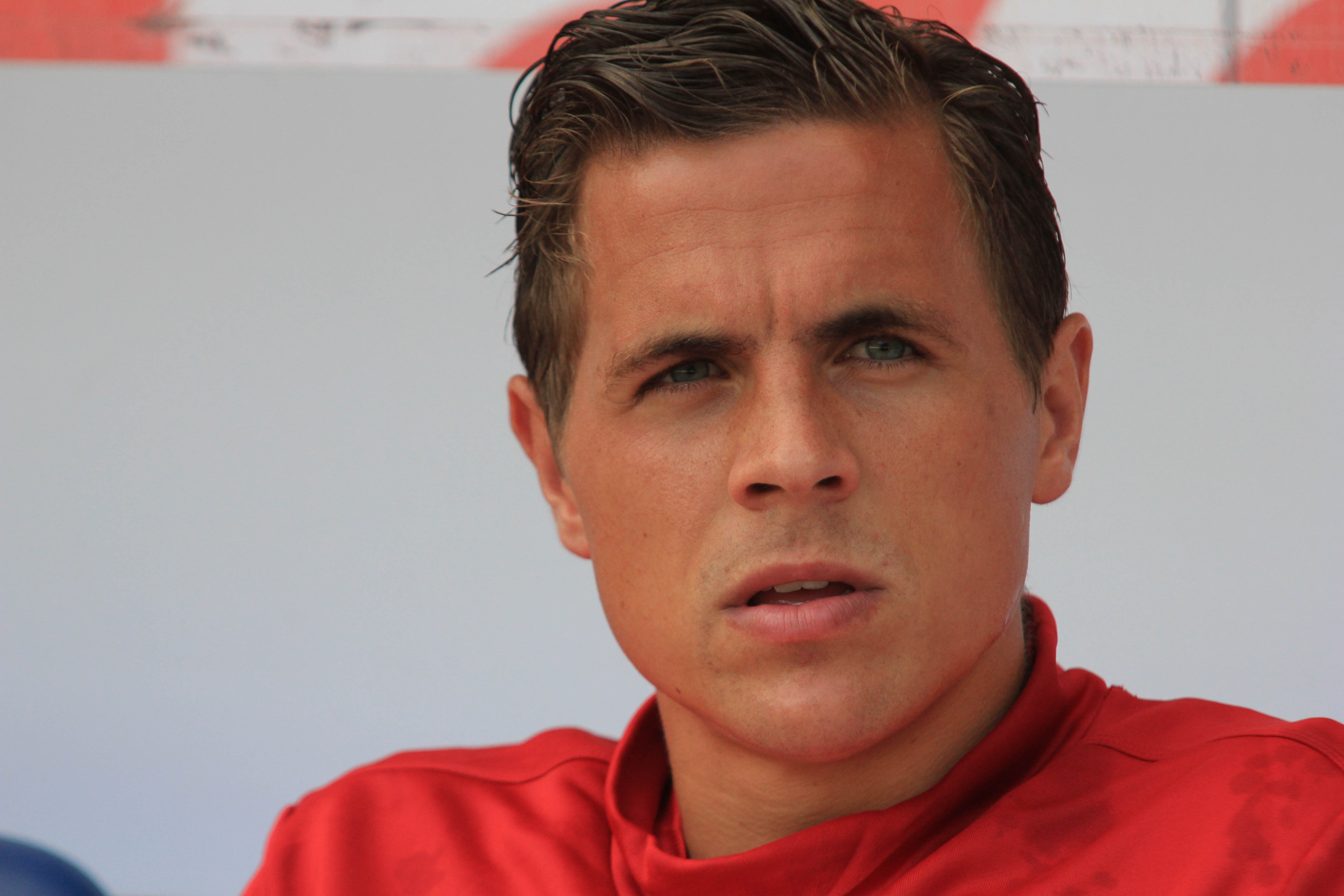
- Verhoek with Twente in July 2012

Personal information
- Full name: Wesley Verhoek
- Date of birth: 25 September 1986 (age 40)
- Place of birth: Leidschendam, Netherlands
- Height: 1.87 m (6 ft 2 in)
- Position: Winger

Youth career
- VUC
- ADO Den Haag

Senior career*
Years	Team	Apps	(Gls)
2004–2012	ADO Den Haag	172	(27)
2012	Twente	11	(1)
2012–2015	Feyenoord	31	(1)
2015	→ Go Ahead Eagles (loan)	15	(2)
2015	Pune City	6	(0)
2017–2018	DHC		
Total		235	(31)
- * Club domestic league appearances and goals

Wesley Verhoek (Dutch pronunciation: [ˈʋɛsli vərˈɦuk]; born 25 September 1986) is a Dutch former professional footballer. He was known as a striker who can also play as a winger on either side of the pitch.

He spent most of his professional career at ADO Den Haag at different positions in attack. His younger brother John is also a professional footballer and Wesley played alongside his brother in the last four months of his ADO career, when the latter was loaned out by Stade Rennes to the Hague football club. After 8 years at ADO, Verhoek transferred to FC Twente in the 2012 winter transfer window, but was traded 7 months later to Feyenoord for Jerson Cabral, who went in the opposite direction.

== Career ==
=== ADO Den Haag ===
Born in Leidschendam, Verhoek's career began when he signed a professional contract with ADO Den Haag, after the winter break in 2004–05 he played his first match in the first team of ADO Den Haag. Verhoek also played for the Dutch youth squad. In August 2011, ADO Den Haag and Nottingham Forest had agreed a fee reported to be £2.5 million for Verhoek to join Forest; however Verhoek he pulled out of the deal, reportedly due to home sickness. Verhoek denied this was the case.

=== Twente ===
At the end of the transfer window in January 2012, Verhoek left ADO Den Haag to sign for FC Twente until July 2014. His time at Twente was not a big success, so he moved to Feyenoord on 31 August 2012.

=== Feyenoord ===
Verhoek joined Feyenoord from Twente on the last day of the 2012 summer transfer window. As part of the deal Jerson Cabral moved to FC Twente.

=== Go Ahead Eagles ===
Early 2015, during the January transfer window, Verhoek agreed to a loan move and joined Go Ahead Eagles for the rest of the season.

=== Pune City and Delft ===
In September 2015, Verhoek joined Indian Super League side FC Pune City.

In October 2017, after returning to the Netherlands he joined amateur side DHC Delft.

== Personal life ==
Following his retirement as a player Verhoek had a fruit and vegetables shop.

== Career statistics ==
As of 26 January 2015

Appearances and goals by club, season and competition
Club	Season	League			Cup		International		Total	
Club	Season	Division	Apps	Goals	Apps	Goals	Apps	Goals	Apps	Goals
ADO Den Haag	2004–05	Eredivisie	9	1	2	0	0	0	11	1
ADO Den Haag	2005–06	Eredivisie	19	1	3	0	0	0	22	1
ADO Den Haag	2006–07	Eredivisie	20	1	2	0	0	0	22	1
ADO Den Haag	2007–08	Eerste Divisie	29	7	1	1	0	0	30	8
ADO Den Haag	2008–09	Eredivisie	17	1	1	1	0	0	18	2
ADO Den Haag	2009–10	Eredivisie	32	7	1	0	0	0	33	7
ADO Den Haag	2010–11	Eredivisie	35	8	2	0	0	0	37	8
ADO Den Haag	2011–12	Eredivisie	14	2	0	0	4	0	18	2
ADO Den Haag	Total		175	28	12	2	4	0	191	30
Twente	2011–12	Eredivisie	9	1	0	0	0	0	9	1
Twente	2012–13	Eredivisie	3	0	0	0	6	0	9	0
Twente	Total		12	1	0	0	6	0	18	1
Feyenoord	2012–13	Eredivisie	25	1	3	0	0	0	28	1
Feyenoord	2013–14	Eredivisie	6	0	1	0	1	0	8	0
Feyenoord	2014–15	Eredivisie	0	0	0	0	1	0	1	0
Feyenoord	Total		31	1	4	0	2	0	37	1
Go Ahead Eagles	2014–15	Eredivisie	1	0	0	0	0	0	1	0
Career total			219	30	16	2	12	0	247	32
