= Ryan van Dijk =

Dutch footballer (born 1990)

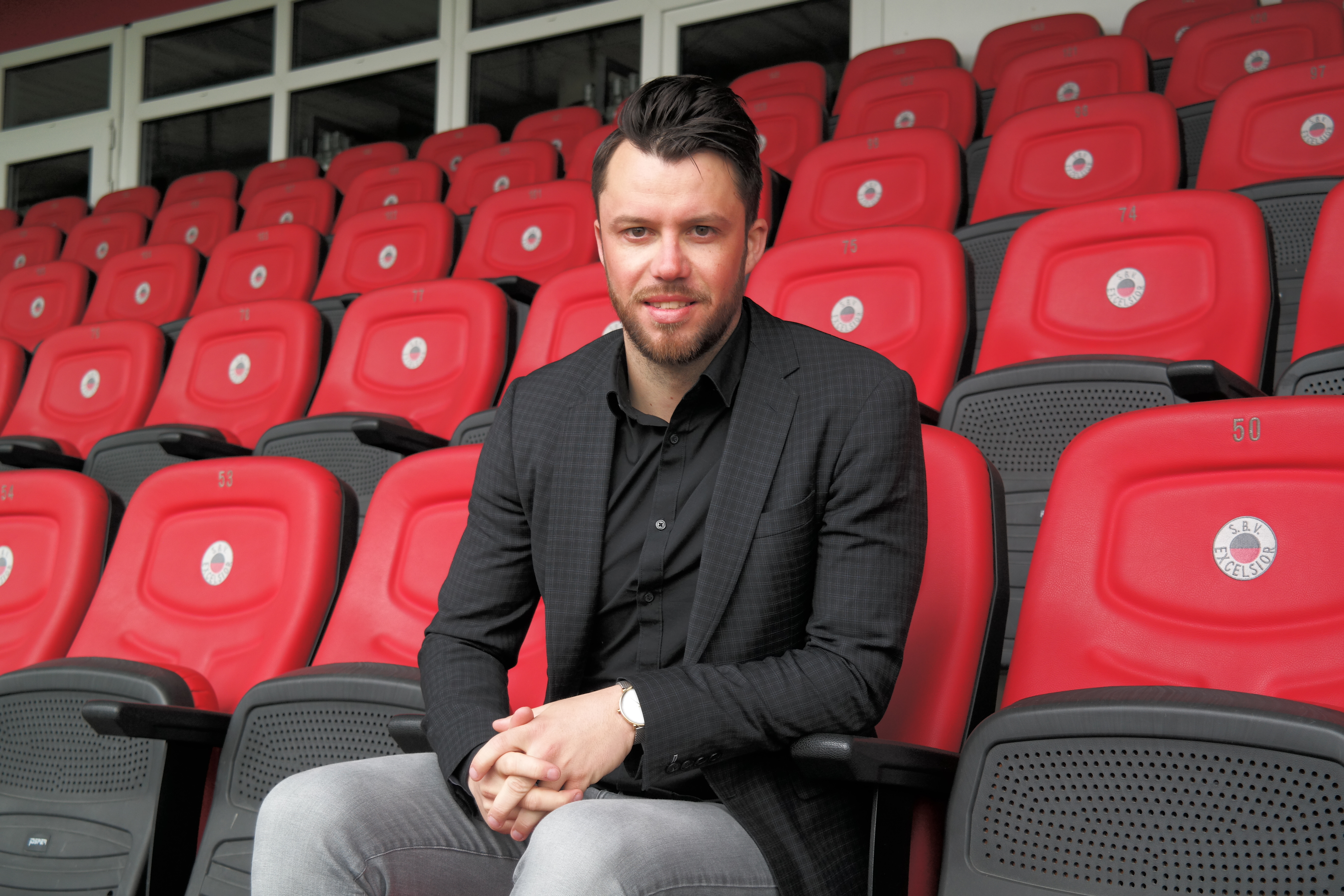

Personal information
- Date of birth: 28 May 1990 (age 36)
- Place of birth: Zevenaar, Netherlands
- Height: 1.87 m (6 ft 2 in)
- Position: Striker

Youth career
- NEC/TOP Oss academy

Senior career*
Years	Team	Apps	(Gls)
2011–2012	FC Oss	6	(0)
- * Club domestic league appearances and goals

Ryan van Dijk (28 May 1990, Zevenaar) is a Dutch retired footballer.

Van Dijk participated in the joined youth program of NEC Nijmegen and FC Oss. In July 2009 he moved to Young NEC Nijmegen. In season 2011/12 he transferred free to FC Oss. Next he played for Sportclub NEC, ASWH, Smitshoek and VV Rhoon, where he also was a youth coach and at the same time Accountmanager partnerships at ADO Den Haag.
