= Rheda Djellal =

Belgian footballer

Personal information
- Full name: Rheda Djellal
- Date of birth: 2 January 1991 (age 35)
- Place of birth: Etterbeek, Belgium
- Height: 1.85 m (6 ft 1 in)
- Position: Forward

Team information
- Current team: Guingamp

Youth career
- 2005–2011: Anderlecht

Senior career*
Years	Team	Apps	(Gls)
2010–2012	Anderlecht II		
2011	→ Excelsior (loan)	2	(0)
2012	RFC Seraing		
2012–2013	SW Harelbeke		
2014	KSC Grimbergen	5	(0)
2015–	Racing Mechelen		
- * Club domestic league appearances and goals as of 17 November 2015

Rheda Djellal (born 2 January 1991 in Etterbeek) is a Belgian football player of Algerian descent, who plays for Racing Mechelen.

== Career ==
Born in Etterbeek, Brussels, Djellal began playing for Anderlecht at age 14.

On 31 August 2011 Djellal was loaned out by Anderlecht to Eredivisie side SBV Excelsior until the end of the season. On 11 September 2011 Djellal made his official debut for Excelsior as a 58th-minute substitute in a league match against Utrecht.
