= Erwin Nuytinck =

Dutch footballer

Personal information
- Full name: Erwin Nuytinck
- Date of birth: 17 January 1994 (age 32)
- Place of birth: Goes, Netherlands
- Height: 1.73 m (5 ft 8 in)
- Position: Midfielder

Team information
- Current team: PSV Poortugaal

Senior career*
Years	Team	Apps	(Gls)
2010–2011	RBC Roosendaal	5	(0)
2011–2014	Excelsior	1	(0)
2014–2017	Alphense Boys		
2017–	PSV Poortugaal		
- * Club domestic league appearances and goals as of 24 December 2017

Erwin Nuytinck (born 17 January 1994) is a Dutch football player who plays as a midfielder. He is currently without a club and formerly played for RBC Roosendaal and Excelsior.
