= Santy Hulst =

Dutch footballer

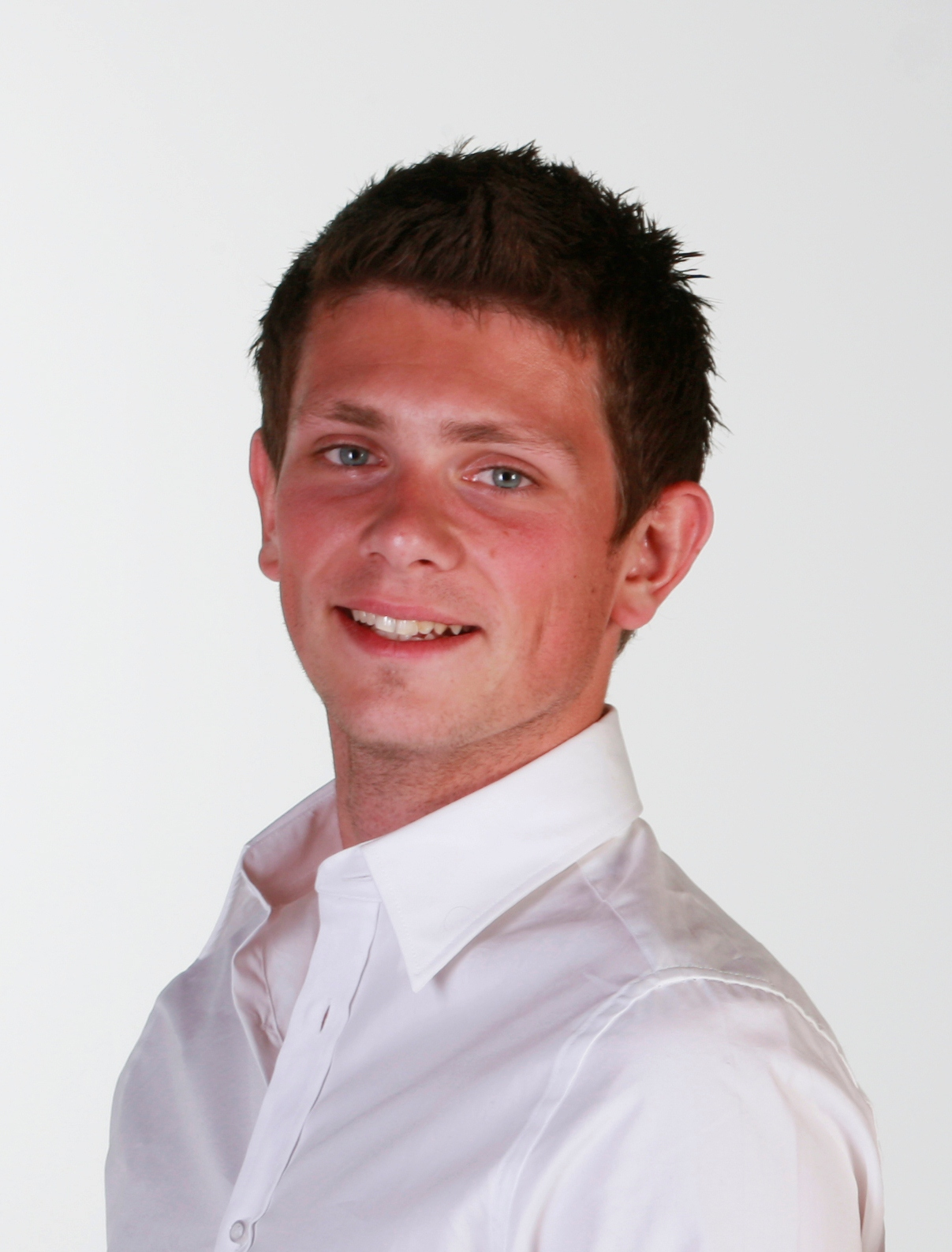

Personal information
- Full name: Santy Hulst
- Date of birth: 26 October 1987 (age 39)
- Place of birth: Leiderdorp, Netherlands
- Height: 1.82 m (5 ft 11 1/2 in)
- Position: Attacking midfielder

Youth career
- RCL
- 2006–2008: AZ

Senior career*
| Years | Team | Apps | (Gls) |
| 2008–2011 | ADO Den Haag | 10 | (1) |
| 2011 | → Dordrecht (loan) | 14 | (6) |
| 2011–2012 | Dordrecht | 32 | (13) |
| 2012–2015 | De Graafschap | 48 | (6) |
| 2015–2016 | Scheveningen | 26 | (4) |
| 2016–2018 | HBS | | |
| Total | | 130 | (30) |
- * Club domestic league appearances and goals

Santy Hulst (born 26 October 1987 in Leiderdorp) is a Dutch retired footballer who played as an attacking midfielder.

== Career ==
Born in Leiderdorp, he started playing football at local amateur side RCL before being snapped up by professional club AZ when he was 18. After an injury-hit period in Alkmaar, where he never made it to te senior team, he joined ADO Den Haag in 2008. Later he moved to FC Dordrecht, De Graafschap, and amateur outfits Scheveningen and HBS. He announced his retirement in May 2018.
