= Cerilio Cijntje =

Dutch footballer

Personal information
- Full name: Cerilio Cijntje
- Date of birth: 26 May 1992 (age 34)
- Place of birth: Heemskerk, Netherlands
- Height: 1.81 m (5 ft 11 in)
- Position: Forward

Youth career
- ODIN '59
- ADO '20
- Ajax
- Willem II

Senior career*
Years	Team	Apps	(Gls)
2011–2013	Telstar	29	(8)
2013–2014	ADO '20	12	(0)
2014–2015	ODIN '59		(8)
2015–2016	Lisse	28	(4)
2016–2017	ODIN '59		
2017–2018	Ajax (amateurs)		
2018–2021	DEM		

International career
2007-2008	Netherlands U16	2	(0)
- * Club domestic league appearances and goals as of 21 December 2013

Cerilio Cijntje (born 26 May 1992 in Heemskerk) is a Dutch footballer who last played for RKVV DEM.

== Club career ==
Cijntje started his professional career at Eerste Divisie club Telstar, after failing to make the grade at Willem II. In September 2013, he trained with former Liga I club Vaslui, but in the end joined hometown club ADO '20. In summer 2015 he joined FC Lisse from ODIN'59.

He returned to Derde Divisie side ODIN '59 after only one season at Lisse.

== International career ==
Cijntje played twice for the Netherlands national under-16 football team.
