= Mitchell Piqué =

Dutch-Surinamese footballer (born 1979)

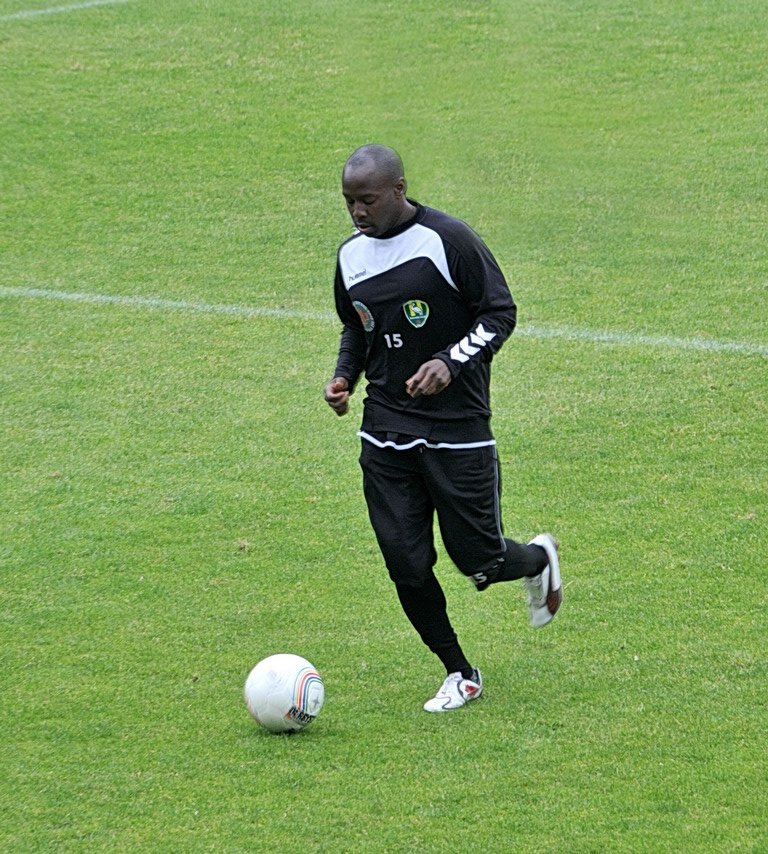
- Piqué training with ADO Den Haag in 2011

Personal information
- Full name: Mitchell Piqué
- Date of birth: 20 November 1979 (age 46)
- Place of birth: Amsterdam, Netherlands
- Height: 1.72 m (5 ft 7 1/2 in)
- Position: Left back

Youth career
- 1994–1995: Voorland
- 1995–1999: Ajax

Senior career*
Years	Team	Apps	(Gls)
1999–2003	Ajax	4	(1)
2000–2001	→ Twente (loan)	12	(0)
2002	→ Haarlem (loan)	14	(3)
2002–2003	→ RBC Roosendaal (loan)	21	(0)
2003–2004	TOP Oss	35	(3)
2004–2006	Cambuur Leeuwarden	67	(3)
2006–2008	Excelsior	55	(2)
2008–2011	ADO Den Haag	38	(0)
2011–2013	Willem II	48	(1)
- * Club domestic league appearances and goals as of 1 October 2013 (UTC)

Mitchell Piqué (born 20 November 1979 in Amsterdam) is a Dutch-Surinamese former footballer who played as a left back.

== Career ==
His former clubs are Excelsior Rotterdam, Ajax Amsterdam, FC Twente, Cambuur Leeuwarden, Excelsior, ADO Den Haag and Willem II. At Ajax he scored once; his goal coming in a 2-0 win at RKC Waalwijk on 13 October 2001.

== Personal life ==
Mitchell's younger cousin Lorenzo played with him at ADO Den Haag.
