= Serhat Köksal =

Dutch footballer

Personal information
- Full name: Serhat Köksal
- Date of birth: 18 February 1990 (age 36)
- Place of birth: The Hague, Netherlands
- Height: 1.77 m (5 ft 9 1/2 in)
- Position: Midfielder

Team information
- Current team: DHC Delft

Youth career
- BMT
- ADO Den Haag

Senior career*
Years	Team	Apps	(Gls)
2010–2012	ADO Den Haag	1	(0)
2011	→ FC Dordrecht (loan)	1	(0)
2012–2014	SV Spakenburg	14	(0)
2014–	DHC Delft		
- * Club domestic league appearances and goals as of 3 September 2015

Serhat Köksal (born 18 February 1990) is a Dutch professional footballer who currently plays as a midfielder for DHC Delft.

Köksal came from ADO Den Haag's own youth squad and won his first professional contract for the 2010–11 season.
