= Robert Zwinkels =

Dutch footballer (born 1983)

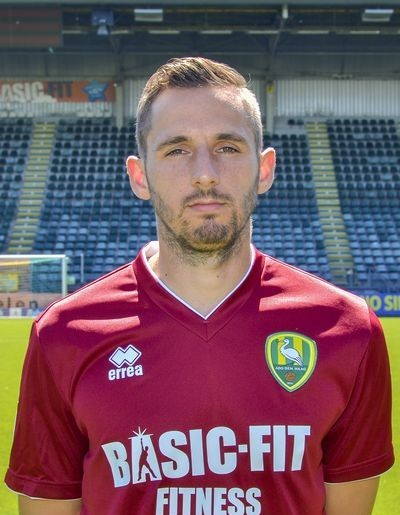
- Zwinkels in 2015

Personal information
- Date of birth: 4 May 1983 (age 43)
- Place of birth: Kwintsheul, Netherlands
- Height: 1.86 m (6 ft 1 in)
- Position: Goalkeeper

Youth career
- SV VELO
- ADO Den Haag
- 2000-2005: Ajax

Senior career*
Years	Team	Apps	(Gls)
2005–2022	ADO Den Haag	156	(0)
- * Club domestic league appearances and goals

Robert Zwinkels (born 4 May 1983) is a Dutch former professional footballer who played as a goalkeeper.

== Career ==
Zwinkels joined ADO Den Haag from the Ajax academy in 2005 and made his first‑team debut the following year at the age of 23. He spent most of his career as second‑choice goalkeeper but was the club's regular starter for three seasons, making a total of 155 competitive appearances.

In July 2020 he signed a new deal that carried him into a 16th consecutive season with ADO, the longest active spell by any Eredivisie player at a single club. His position changed after head coach Ruud Brood arrived in October 2021: Zwinkels trained initially but was soon told there was no room for him in the match‑day squad, with Luuk Koopmans and two academy goalkeepers preferred.

Zwinkels went on sick leave late in 2021. When Koopmans suffered an injury in January 2022, Brood said recalling the veteran was "not an option". On 20 May 2022 club and player agreed to terminate the rolling contract that would otherwise have seen him move into a back‑room role after retirement.

== After football ==
In January 2024, Zwinkels returned to the amateur game as a member of the youth‑coaching staff at Loosduinen club GDA, working principally with the club's goalkeepers alongside former team‑mate Ronald Samson.

The following year he took up a civil‑service post as a sports adviser for the municipality of The Hague, focusing on community programmes that promote safe participation and healthy lifestyles among young people.

== Career statistics ==
As of match played 7 March 2020

Appearances and goals by club, season and competition
Club	Season	League			National Cup		Other		Total	
Club	Season	Division	Apps	Goals	Apps	Goals	Apps	Goals	Apps	Goals
ADO Den Haag	2005–06	Eredivisie	1	0	0	0	0	0	1	0
ADO Den Haag	2006–07	Eredivisie	15	0	0	0	0	0	15	0
ADO Den Haag	2007–08	Eerste Divisie	15	0	0	0	7	0	22	0
ADO Den Haag	2008–09	Eredivisie	26	0	1	0	0	0	27	0
ADO Den Haag	2009–10	Eredivisie	12	0	0	0	0	0	12	0
ADO Den Haag	2010–11	Eredivisie	1	0	0	0	0	0	1	0
ADO Den Haag	2011–12	Eredivisie	1	0	2	0	0	0	3	0
ADO Den Haag	2012–13	Eredivisie	7	0	2	0	0	0	9	0
ADO Den Haag	2013–14	Eredivisie	6	0	0	0	0	0	6	0
ADO Den Haag	2014–15	Eredivisie	2	0	1	0	0	0	3	0
ADO Den Haag	2015–16	Eredivisie	1	0	1	0	0	0	2	0
ADO Den Haag	2016–17	Eredivisie	12	0	3	0	0	0	15	0
ADO Den Haag	2017–18	Eredivisie	29	0	1	0	1	0	31	0
ADO Den Haag	2018–19	Eredivisie	22	0	2	0	0	0	24	0
ADO Den Haag	2019–20	Eredivisie	5	0	0	0	0	0	5	0
Career total			155	0	14	0	8	0	177	0
