= Roderick Gielisse =

Dutch footballer (born 1990)

Personal information
- Date of birth: 4 February 1990 (age 36)
- Place of birth: Voorburg, Netherlands
- Height: 1.75 m (5 ft 9 in)
- Position: Right-back

Youth career
- Moerkapelle

Senior career*
Years	Team	Apps	(Gls)
2010–2013	ADO Den Haag	4	(0)
2011–2013	→ Dordrecht (loan)	55	(1)
2013–2015	Sparta	13	(0)
2015–2025	Rijnsburgse Boys	246	(12)
- * Club domestic league appearances and goals as of 5 August 2025

Roderick Gielisse (born 4 February 1990) is a Dutch retired footballer who played as a right-back.

He grew up in Moerkapelle and played professionally for ADO Den Haag, FC Dordrecht and Sparta Rotterdam. He spent the majority of his career however with Rijnsburgse Boys in the Tweede Divisie and Derde Divisie and retired in summer 2025.

After retiring as a player, Gielisse stayed at Rijnsburgse Boys to be involved with player recruitment alongside his regular job as recruitment-consultant.
