= Giorgio Achterberg =

Dutch professional footballer

Personal information
- Full name: Giorgio Achterberg
- Date of birth: 1 February 1990 (age 36)
- Place of birth: The Hague, Netherlands
- Height: 1.80 m (5 ft 11 in)
- Position: Midfielder

Youth career
- VCS
- 1998–1999: Ajax
- 1999–2010: ADO Den Haag

Senior career*
Years	Team	Apps	(Gls)
2010–2012	ADO Den Haag	2	(0)
2011–2012	→ FC Dordrecht (loan)	12	(0)
2012–2014	Scheveningen	40	(4)
2014–2016	Haaglandia		
2016–2017	Katwijk	4	(0)
2017–2018	RKAVV		
- * Club domestic league appearances and goals

Giorgio Achterberg (born 1 February 1990) is a Dutch retired footballer who last played for RKAVV.

== Club career ==
Born in The Hague, Achterberg started playing football at a young age for local side VCS before joining the Ajax youth academy in 1998. Due to issues with transportation, he started playing in the youth academy for hometown club ADO Den Haag after only one season with the Amsterdam club. Achterberg made his professional debut for ADO Den Haag against VVV Venlo.

In June 2011, he was sent on a one-year loan to FC Dordrecht. and later moved to amateur side Scheveningen.

In summer 2014, he left Scheveningen for fellow amateurs Haaglandia but broke his calf in September 2014 to put him out for months.
