= Leroy Resodihardjo =

Dutch footballer

Personal information
- Date of birth: 4 March 1987 (age 39)
- Place of birth: Leidschendam, Netherlands
- Height: 1.84 m (6 ft 0 in)
- Position: Midfielder

Team information
- Current team: Smitshoek
- Number: 4

Senior career*
| Years | Team | Apps | (Gls) |
| 2008–2011 | ADO Den Haag | 19 | (1) |
| 2011 | → Almere City (loan) | 9 | (1) |
| 2011–2013 | Almere City | 30 | (2) |
| 2013–2019 | Scheveningen | 169 | (25) |
| 2019– | Smitshoek | 20 | (0) |
- * Club domestic league appearances and goals as of 9 November 2020

Leroy Resodihardjo (born 4 March 1987) is a Dutch footballer who plays for VV Smitshoek, as a midfielder.

== Career ==
Born in Leidschendam, Resodihardjo has played for ADO Den Haag, Almere City, SVV Scheveningen and VV Smitshoek.

== Personal life ==
He is of Indonesian descent.
