= Ahmed Ammi =

Dutch-Moroccan footballer (1981–2026)

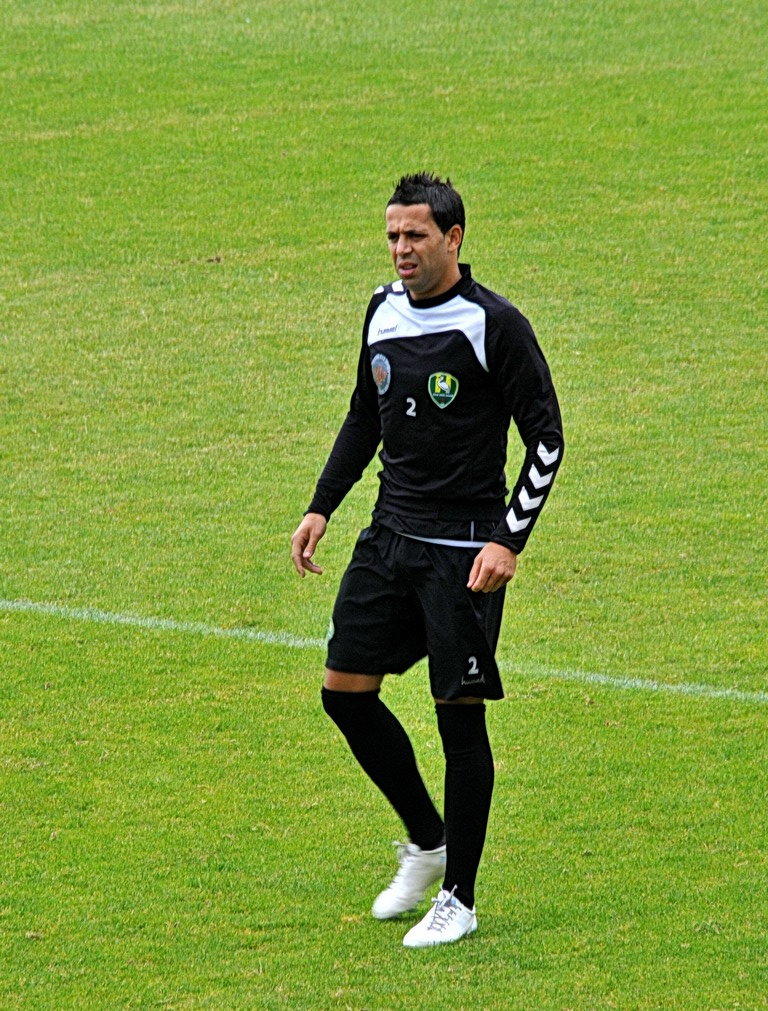
- Ammi in 2011

Personal information
- Date of birth: 19 January 1981
- Place of birth: Temsamane, Morocco
- Date of death: 15 September 2026 (aged 45)
- Height: 1.79 m (5 ft 10 in)
- Position: Right-back

Youth career
- 1993–1999: SV Blerick
- 1999–2000: VVV-Venlo

Senior career*
Years	Team	Apps	(Gls)
2001–2007	VVV-Venlo	178	(3)
2007–2008	NAC Breda	24	(2)
2008–2013	ADO Den Haag	93	(0)
2012–2013	→ VVV-Venlo (loan)	8	(0)
2014	KFC Uerdingen	9	(0)
Total		312	(5)
- * Club domestic league appearances and goals

Ahmed Ammi (Arabic: أحمد عمي; 19 January 1981 – 15 September 2026) was a Moroccan-Dutch professional footballer who played as a right-back.

== Club career ==
Ammi was born in Temsamane, Morocco, before moving to the Netherlands at a young age. He started playing football for local amateur side, SV Blerick, but was added to the youth department of VVV-Venlo, who at that time were known as VVV. He made his debut in the 2000–01 season, when VVV played in the Eerste Divisie.

He made his next step in 2006, when he signed with NAC Breda. After playing only one season in Breda, he moved on to ADO Den Haag in 2008.

Ammi moved to German Regionalliga West club KFC Uerdingen 05 in January 2014 and played for EVV, before joining fellow amateur side SC Irene in summer 2016. Ammi retired in 2018.

== Personal life and death ==
In May 2025, Ammi was diagnosed with bowel cancer. He died on 15 September 2026, at the age of 45.
