= 2009–10 FC Emmen season =

Dutch football club season

FC Emmen
2009–10 season
- Stadium: De Oude Meerdijk
- Eerste Divisie: 15th
- KNVB Cup: 3rd round
- Top goalscorer: League: Hans Denissen (12 goals); Ruud ter Heide (12 goals); All: Hans Denissen (13 goals)
- Biggest win: 6-1 (AFC '34 (a) KNVB Cup 3rd round)
- Biggest defeat: 6-0 (FC Volendam (a) 12th week)
- All statistics correct as of 23 April 2010.

The 2009–10 season was FC Emmen's 25th successive season in the Eerste Divisie, the second tier of Dutch football. Emmen finished 15th in the league standings and were eliminated from the KNVB Cup in the second round, losing 4–2 to Go Ahead Eagles after extra time.

Hans Denissen led the club's goalscoring charts with 13 goals across all competitions, scoring 12 times in the Eerste Divisie and once in the KNVB Cup. Meanwhile, Michel Poldervaart made more appearances than any other FC Emmen player during the campaign, playing 34 matches in total, comprising 32 league fixtures and two cup appearances.

== Players ==
=== First-team squad ===
As of 1 March 2010

Note: Flags indicate national team as defined under FIFA eligibility rules; some limited exceptions apply. Players may hold more than one non-FIFA nationality.

No.	Pos.	Nation	Player
6	DF	BEL	Joos Valgaeren
10	FW	NED	Roy Stroeve
14	DF	NED	Niek Ripson
15	DF	NED	Kevin Görtz
—	GK	IRI	Agil Etemadi
—	MF	CUW	Angelo Zimmerman
—	FW	CUW	Anton Jongsma
—	DF	NED	Arjen Bergsma
—	MF	NED	Erik van der Ven
—	MF	NED	Erwin Buurmeijer
—	DF	NED	Guus de Vries
—	GK	NED	Harm Zeinstra
—	DF	NED	Hassan Bai Kamara
—	MF	NED	Hans Denissen
—	MF	BRA	Leonardo
—	DF	BRA	Lázaro

No.	Pos.	Nation	Player
—	FW	NED	Michel Poldervaart
—	FW	SUI	Miloš Malenović
—	MF	NED	Patrick Lip
—	FW	BRA	Pedro Beda
—	DF	BFA	Rahim Ouédraogo
—	FW	NED	Ruud ter Heide
—	DF	NED	Sander Fischer
—	DF	NED	Sjors Paridaans
—	DF	MAR	Sofian Akouili
—	FW	NED	Steven de Blok
—	FW	HUN	Tamás Germán
—	DF	CUW	Timothy Cathalina
—	DF	NED	Tim Siekman
—	MF	NED	Wesley Wakker
—	MF	NED	Xander Houtkoop

== Transfers ==
=== In ===
Pos.	Player	Transferred from	Fee	Date
GK	(Iran) Agil Etemadi	(Netherlands) SC Heerenveen	On loan	1 July 2009
MF	(Netherlands) Arjen Bergsma	(Netherlands) SC Heerenveen	On loan	1 July 2009
DF	(Netherlands) Sjors Paridaans	(Netherlands) FC Eindhoven	Free	1 July 2009
MF	(Netherlands) Erik van der Ven	(Netherlands) TOP Oss	Free	1 August 2009
FW	(Netherlands) Hans Denissen	(Finland) FC Haka	Free	1 August 2009
FW	(Switzerland) Miloš Malenović	No club	—N/a	1 September 2009
DF	(Brazil) Leonardo	No club	—N/a	1 October 2009
DF	(Curaçao) Angelo Zimmerman	(Netherlands) RBC Roosendaal	Free	1 January 2010
MF	(Netherlands) Erwin Buurmeijer	(Netherlands) BV Veendam	On loan	1 January 2010
DF	(Netherlands) Patrick Lip	(Netherlands) BV Veendam	Free	1 January 2010
FW	(Netherlands) Ruud ter Heide	(Netherlands) SC Cambuur	On loan	1 January 2010
DF	(Netherlands) Sander Fischer	(Netherlands) SC Cambuur	Free	1 January 2010
FW	(Curaçao) Anton Jongsma	No club	—N/a	1 March 2010

=== Out ===
Pos.	Player	Transferred to	Fee	Date
FW	(Iran) Reza Ghoochannejhad	(Netherlands) SC Heerenveen	End of loan	30 June 2009
FW	(Netherlands) Robin Huisman de Jong	(Netherlands) SC Heerenveen	End of loan	30 June 2009
FW	(Netherlands) Geoffrey Verweij	(Netherlands) IJsselmeervogels	Free	1 July 2009
GK	(Netherlands) Jeffrey Brammer	(Netherlands) HSC '21	Free	1 July 2009
MF	(Netherlands) Jesse Schotman	(Netherlands) VV Haaglandia	Free	1 July 2009
FW	(Netherlands) Kiran Bechan	(Cyprus) Ermis Aradippou FC	Free	1 July 2009
MF	(Netherlands) Marcel Pannekoek	(Netherlands) PKC '83	Free	1 July 2009
DF	(Netherlands) Mark Bevaart	(Netherlands) FC Omniworld	Free	1 July 2009
MF	(Netherlands) Martijn Kamps	(Netherlands) PKC '83	Free	1 July 2009
DF	(Netherlands) Michael van der Kruis	(Netherlands) Quick Boys	Free	1 July 2009
FW	(Denmark) Morten Friis Jensen	(Denmark) FC Fredericia	Free	1 July 2009
FW	(Netherlands) Rick ten Voorde	(Netherlands) NEC Nijmegen	Free	1 July 2009
MF	(Belgium) Robbie Haemhouts	(Netherlands) FC Omniworld	Free	1 July 2009
DF	(Netherlands) Robin Demeijer	(Netherlands) WKE '16	Free	1 July 2009
FW	(Netherlands) Rogier Krohne	(Germany) BV Cloppenburg	Free	1 July 2009
FW	(Netherlands) Sander Danes	(Netherlands) HHC Hardenberg	Free	1 July 2009
DF	(Netherlands) Sieme Zijm	(Netherlands) Excelsior Maassluis	Free	1 July 2009
GK	(Denmark) Thomas Villadsen	(Denmark) FC Nordsjælland	Free	1 July 2009
DF	(Belgium) Joos Valgaeren	End of career	—N/a	1 November 2009

== Competitions ==
=== Overall record ===
Competition	First match	Last match	Starting round	Final position	Record							
Competition	First match	Last match	Starting round	Final position	Pld	W	D	L	GF	GA	GD	Win %
Eerste Divisie	7 August 2009	23 April 2010	Week 1	15th	36	10	8	18	51	79	−28	27.78
KNVB Cup	22 September 2009	27 October 2009	2nd round	3rd round	2	1	0	1	8	5	+3	50.00
Total					38	11	8	19	59	84	−25	28.95

Source: ESPN

=== Eerste Divisie ===
==== Results summary ====
Overall								Home						Away					
Pld	W	D	L	GF	GA	GD	Pts	W	D	L	GF	GA	GD	W	D	L	GF	GA	GD
36	10	8	18	51	79	−28	38	6	5	8	31	38	−7	4	3	10	20	41	−21

Last updated: 23 April 2010.
Source: https://www.espn.nl/voetbal/team/scorebord/_/id/3707/competitie/NED.2/season/2009/

==== Results by round ====
Round	1	2	3	4	5	6	7	8	9	10	11	12	13	14	15	16	17	18	19	20	21	22	23	24	25	26	27	28	29	30	31	32	33	34	35	36	37
Ground	H	A	H	H	A	A	H	A	H	H	A	A	H	A	H	H	A	H	A	H	A	H	A	A	A	H	H	A	A	H	A	H	H	A	A	H	A
Result	L	D	D	L	L	L	L	L	L	W	L	L	W	W	L	D	L	W	L	L	L	D	L	W	W	L	D	W	D	W	L	D	W	W	D	L	L
Position																																					15

Source: https://www.espn.nl/voetbal/team/scorebord/_/id/3707/competitie/NED.2/season/2009/ ESPN
A = Away; H = Home; W = Win; D = Draw; L = Loss

=== Matches ===
==== 1st half ====
7 August 2009 1st week	FC Emmen	0–4	RBC Roosendaal	Emmen
20:00		Report	Angelo Zimmerman 4'; Gregory Nelson 29'; Umut Gündoğan 50'; Sjoerd Ars 58'	Stadium: Unive Stadion

14 August 2009 2nd week	PEC Zwolle	0–0	FC Emmen	Zwolle
20:00		Report		Stadium: Oosterenkstadion

21 August 2009 3rd week	FC Emmen	0–0	FC Den Bosch	Emmen
20:00		Report		Stadium: Unive Stadion

24 August 2009 4th week	FC Emmen	0–1	Go Ahead Eagles	Emmen
20:00		Report	Halil Çolak 49'	Stadium: Unive Stadion

28 August 2009 5th week	HFC Haarlem	4–0 (Note: This game is not included in the league table.)	FC Emmen	Haarlem
20:00	Wilmer Kousemaker 4'; Irfan Bachdim 5'; Laurens Ten Heuvel 16' 20'	Report		Stadium: Haarlem Stadion

4 September 2009 6th week	MVV Maastricht	2–1	FC Emmen	Maastricht
20:00	Alexandre Bryssinck 9'; Bryan Linssen 31'	Report	Hans Denissen 87'	Stadium: De Geusselt

11 September 2009 7th week	FC Emmen	1–3	Almere City FC	Emmen
20:00	Wesley Wakker 84'	Report	Sander Duits 19' (pen.); Marien Willemsen 45'; Jergé Hoefdraad 69'	Stadium: Unive Stadion

18 September 2009 8th week	SC Telstar	4–1	FC Emmen	Velsen-Zuid
20:00	Kevin Brands 27' 34'; Glynor Plet 79'; Sjors Paridaans 89' (o.g.)	Report	Tim Siekman 50'	Stadium: Sportpark Schoonenberg

25 September 2009 9th week	FC Emmen	1–3	Helmond Sport	Emmen
20:00	Pedro Beda 86'	Report	Charles Kazlauskas 65'; Mark Veldmate 73'; Marc Höcher 77'	Stadium: Unive Stadion

2 October 2009 10th week	FC Emmen	3–1	AGOVV	Emmen
20:00	Hans Denissen 33'; Miloš Malenović 68' 72' (pen.)	Report	Olaf Lindenbergh 9'	Stadium: Unive Stadion

9 October 2009 11th week	FC Dordrecht	5–0	FC Emmen	Dordrecht
20:00	Genero Zeefuik 12' 72'; Guy Ramos 33'; Ibad Muhamadu 62' 80'	Report		Stadium: Stadion Krommedijk

18 October 2009 12th week	FC Volendam	6–0	FC Emmen	Volendam
14:30	Rowin van Zaanen 8' 14' 61'; Jack Tuyp 18' 65'; Melvin Platje 73'	Report		Stadium: Kras Stadion

23 October 2009 13th week	FC Emmen	4–2	Excelsior Rotterdam	Emmen
20:00	Miloš Malenović 55'; Sjors Paridaans 67'; Hans Denissen 85'; Xander Houtkoop 90'	Report	Michal Janota 40'; Guyon Fernandez 43'	Stadium: Unive Stadion

30 October 2009 14th week	TOP Oss	1–3	FC Emmen	Oss
20:00	Joel Tshibamba 20'	Report	Roy Stroeve 25'; Hans Denissen 38'; Miloš Malenović 83'	Stadium: Heesen Yachts Stadion

23 October 2009 15th week	FC Emmen	1–2	De Graafschap	Emmen
14:30	Hans Denissen 41'	Report	Yuri Rose 9' 79'	Stadium: Unive Stadion

13 November 2009 16th week	FC Emmen	0–0	Fortuna Sittard	Emmen
20:00		Report		Stadium: Unive Stadion

20 November 2009 17th week	SC Cambuur	1–0	FC Emmen	Leeuwarden
20:00	Sandor van der Heide 61'	Report		Stadium: Cambuur Stadion

27 November 2009 18th week	FC Emmen	4–1	FC Eindhoven	Emmen
20:00	Roy Stroeve 22' 72'; Xander Houtkoop 88'; Miloš Malenović 90'	Report	Tim Nelemans 12'	Stadium: Unive Stadion

30 November 2009 19th week	BV Veendam	3–0	FC Emmen	Veendam
20:00	Marnix Kolder 4'; Erwin Buurmeijer 48'; Gerard Wiekens 64'	Report		Stadium: De Langeleegte

4 December 2009 20th week	FC Emmen	2–4	FC Volendam	Emmen
20:00	Hans Denissen 18'; Miloš Malenović 61'	Report	Rowin van Zaanen 44'; Michiel Kramer 62' 68' 71'	Stadium: Unive Stadion

11 December 2009 21st week	Excelsior Rotterdam	4–1	FC Emmen	Rotterdam
20:00	Guyon Fernandez 16' 26'; Kermit Erasmus 28' 71'	Report	Hans Denissen 4'	Stadium: Stadion Woudestein

==== 2nd half ====
22 January 2010 22nd week	FC Emmen	1–1	FC Dordrecht	Emmen
20:00	Sjors Paridaans 49'	Report	Moussa Kalisse 90+2'	Stadium: Unive Stadion

8 February 2010 23rd week	Almere City FC	3–1	FC Emmen	Almere
20:00	Karim Fachtali 27'; Marien Willemsen 38'; David Depetris 80'	Report	Ruud ter Heide 16' (pen.)	Stadium: Yanmar Stadion

12 February 2010 24th week	De Graafschap	2–3	FC Emmen	Doetinchem
20:00	Berry Powel 22'; Soufian El Hassnaoui 77'	Report	Hans Denissen 8'; Ruud ter Heide 45' 74'	Stadium: De Vijverberg

19 February 2010 25th week	Fortuna Sittard	0–2	FC Emmen	Sittard
20:00		Report	Ruud ter Heide 26' 90+2'	Stadium: Fortuna Stadion

26 February 2010 26th week	FC Emmen	2–4	SC Cambuur	Emmen
20:00	Hans Denissen 21' 61'	Report	Michel Poldervaart 6' (o.g.); Danny Guijt 18'; Kevin Diaz 67'; Nassir Maachi 90+4'	Stadium: Unive Stadion

1 March 2010 27th week	FC Emmen	3–3	TOP Oss	Emmen
20:00	Xander Houtkoop 8'; Ruud ter Heide 15' 38'	Report	Tim Peters 20' 88'; Johan Plat 63'	Stadium: Unive Stadion

5 March 2010 28th week	FC Eindhoven	1–2	FC Emmen	Eindhoven
20:00	Tim Nelemans 22'	Report	Ruud ter Heide 78'; Roy Stroeve 84' (pen.)	Stadium: Jan Louwers Stadion

8 March 2010 29th week	RBC Roosendaal	1–1	FC Emmen	Roosendaal
20:00	Tjaronn Chery 68'	Report	Roy Stroeve 59'	Stadium: RBC Stadion

12 March 2010 30th week	FC Emmen	3–2	SC Telstar	Emmen
20:00	Ruud ter Heide 5'; Hans Denissen 87'; Steven de Blok 90+2'	Report	Glynor Plet 51' 66'	Stadium: Unive Stadion

15 March 2010 31st week	AGOVV	3–1	FC Emmen	Apeldoorn
20:00	Nacer Chadli 35'; Jop van der Linden 56'; Paul Mulders 67'	Report	Roy Stroeve 53'	Stadium: Sportpark Berg & Bos

19 March 2010 32nd week	FC Emmen	2–2	BV Veendam	Emmen
20:00	Guus de Vries 49'; Roy Stroeve 87'	Report	Martijn van der Laan 23'; Michiel Hemmen 62'	Stadium: Unive Stadion

22 March 2010 33rd week	FC Emmen	2–1	MVV Maastricht	Emmen
20:00	Ruud ter Heide 87' (pen.) 90'	Report	Alexandre Bryssinck 35'	Stadium: Unive Stadion

28 March 2010 34th week	Go Ahead Eagles	0–2	FC Emmen	Deventer
14:30		Report	Roy Stroeve 77'; Erwin Buurmeijer 90+3'	Stadium: De Adelaarshorst

2 April 2010 35th week	FC Den Bosch	4–4	FC Emmen	's-Hertogenbosch
20:00	Paco van Moorsel 28'; Paul Jans 36'; Fabio Caracciolo 49' (pen.); Diangi Matusiwa 90+3'	Report	Hans Denissen 63'; Angelo Zimmerman 67'; Erik van der Ven 75'; Ruud ter Heide 84' (pen.)	Stadium: De Vliert

16 April 2010 36th week	FC Emmen	0–3	PEC Zwolle	Emmen
20:00		Report	Cecilio Lopes 10'; Danny Schreurs 33'; Eldridge Rojer 84'	Stadium: Unive Stadion

23 April 2010 37th week	Helmond Sport	2–0	FC Emmen	Helmond
20:00	Johan Voskamp 73'; Marc Höcher 90+2'	Report		Stadium: Stadion De Braak

=== KNVB Cup ===
22 September 2009 2nd round	AFC '34	1–6	FC Emmen	Alkmaar
17:00	Tim Ruder 47'	Report	Roy Stroeve 4' 62' 80'; Michel Poldervaart 28' 68'; Hans Denissen 41'	Stadium: Sportpark Robonsbosweg; Attendance: 300; Referee: Martin van den Kerkhof

27 October 2009 3rd round	Go Ahead Eagles	4–2 (a.e.t.)	FC Emmen	Deventer
20:00	Reza Ghoochannejhad 9'; Halil Çolak 31'; Sander Post 98'; Joey Suk 103'	Report	Miloš Malenović 86'; Niek Ripson 90'	Stadium: De Adelaarshorst; Attendance: 2,396; Referee: Ed Janssen

== Statistics ==
=== Scorers ===
#	Player	Eerste Divisie	KNVB Cup	Total
1	(Netherlands) Hans Denissen	12	1	13
2	(Netherlands) Ruud ter Heide	12	0	12
3	(Netherlands) Roy Stroeve	8	3	11
4	(Serbia) Miloš Malenović	6	1	7
5	(Netherlands) Xander Houtkoop	3	0	3
6	(Netherlands) Sjors Paridaans	2	0	2
6	(Netherlands) Wesley Wakker	2	0	2
6	(Netherlands) Michel Poldervaart	0	2	2
9	(Netherlands) Angelo Zimmerman	1	0	1
9	(Netherlands) Erik van der Ven	1	0	1
9	(Netherlands) Erwin Buurmeijer	1	0	1
9	(Netherlands) Guus de Vries	1	0	1
9	(Brazil) Pedro Beda	1	0	1
9	(Netherlands) Steven de Blok	1	0	1
9	(Netherlands) Tim Siekman	1	0	1
9	(Netherlands) Niek Ripson	0	1	1

=== Appearances ===
#	Player	Eerste Divisie	KNVB	Total
1	(Netherlands) Michel Poldervaart	32	2	34
2	(Netherlands) Xander Houtkoop	32	1	33
3	(Netherlands) Niek Ripson	29	1	30
4	(Netherlands) Roy Stroeve	27	2	29
5	(Netherlands) Sjors Paridaans	25	2	27
6	(Netherlands) Harm Zeinstra	24	1	25
7	(Netherlands) Guus de Vries	23	1	24
8	(Netherlands) Hans Denissen	21	2	23
9	(Netherlands) Erik van der Ven	20	2	22
10	(Netherlands) Ruud ter Heide	20	0	20
11	(Netherlands) Arjen Bergsma	18	1	19
12	(Brazil) Pedro Beda	17	1	18
13	(Switzerland) Miloš Malenović	16	1	17
13	(Curaçao) Timothy Cathalina	16	1	17
15	(Netherlands) Sander Fischer	15	0	15
16	(Netherlands) Kevin Görtz	13	1	14
17	(Curaçao) Angelo Zimmerman	13	0	13
17	(Iran) Agil Etemadi	12	1	13
17	(Netherlands) Steven de Blok	11	2	13
20	(Brazil) Leonardo	12	0	12
20	(Morocco) Sofian Akouili	11	1	12
22	(Netherlands) Erwin Buurmeijer	9	0	9
22	(Burkina Faso) Rahim Ouédraogo	9	0	9
24	(Netherlands) Tim Siekman	7	1	8
24	(Netherlands) Wesley Wakker	6	2	8
26	(Netherlands) Hassan Bai Kamara	7	0	7
26	(Hungary) Tamás Germán	7	0	7
28	(Curaçao) Anton Jongsma	6	0	6
28	(Netherlands) Patrick Lip	6	0	6
30	(Brazil) Lázaro	4	1	5
31	(Belgium) Joos Valgaeren	4	0	4

=== Clean sheets ===
#	Player	Eerste Divisie
1	(Netherlands) Harm Zeinstra	2

=== Disciplinary record ===
#	Player	Eerste Divisie		KNVB		Total	
#	Player	Yellow card	Red card	Yellow card	Red card	Yellow card	Red card
1	(Netherlands) Arjen Bergsma	4	1	0	0	4	1
2	(Brazil) Leonardo	2	1	0	0	2	1
3	(Netherlands) Tim Siekman	0	1	0	0	0	1
4	(Netherlands) Guus de Vries	6	0	1	0	7	0
5	(Netherlands) Niek Ripson	5	0	0	0	5	0
5	(Netherlands) Sjors Paridaans	5	0	0	0	5	0
7	(Netherlands) Roy Stroeve	4	0	0	0	4	0
8	(Brazil) Pedro Beda	3	0	0	0	3	0
8	(Burkina Faso) Rahim Ouédraogo	3	0	0	0	3	0
8	(Netherlands) Steven de Blok	2	0	1	0	3	0
11	(Netherlands) Erik van der Ven	2	0	0	0	2	0
11	(Netherlands) Hans Denissen	2	0	0	0	2	0
11	(Netherlands) Kevin Görtz	2	0	0	0	2	0
11	(Morocco) Sofian Akouili	2	0	0	0	2	0
11	(Curaçao) Timothy Cathalina	2	0	0	0	2	0
11	(Netherlands) Xander Houtkoop	2	0	0	0	2	0
17	(Iran) Agil Etemadi	1	0	0	0	1	0
17	(Curaçao) Angelo Zimmerman	1	0	0	0	1	0
17	(Netherlands) Michel Poldervaart	1	0	0	0	1	0
17	(Netherlands) Sander Fischer	1	0	0	0	1	0
