= 2015–16 KNVB Cup =

Tournament details
- Country: Netherlands
- Teams: 85

Final positions
- Champions: Feyenoord (12th title)
- Runners-up: FC Utrecht

Tournament statistics
- Top goal scorer(s): Patrick Gerritsen (5 goals)

The 2015–16 KNVB Cup tournament was the 98th edition of the Dutch national football annual knockout tournament to determine the winner of the KNVB Cup.

FC Groningen unsuccessfully defended its 2015 title losing in the third round to FC Utrecht, 5–3. Feyenoord successfully pursued its 2016 Cup title on 24 April 2016 at De Kuip stadium in Rotterdam defeating FC Utrecht, 2–1. 45,592 in attendance. They qualified for: the group stage in the Europa League the following season and the Johan Cruyff Shield, the Dutch Supercup match between the Cup winner and the champions of the Eredivisie.

== Qualification ==
Teams qualified for the Cup through the following: (reserve teams were excluded)

| Competition (tiers and how they qualified) | Number of teams | Round in which they enter |
|---|---|---|
| Eredivisie, Eerste Divisie (1, 2) | 35 | Second round |
| Topklasse (3, champions and winners of period titles of the 2014–15 Topklasse) | 10 | Second round |
| Topklasse (remaining teams of the 2015–16 Topklasse) | 16 | First round |
| KNVB District Cups (15 from tier 4, 4 from tier 5, 2 from tier 6 and 3 from tier 7, the semi-finalists of the 2014–15 KNVB District Cups) | 24 | First round |

== Calendar ==
The calendar is as follows:

| Round | Draw date (location of the draw) | Date |
|---|---|---|
| First round | 1 July 2015 (at the KNVB headquarters in Zeist) | 26 August 2015 |
| Second round | 1 July 2015 (at the KNVB headquarters in Zeist) | 22–24 September 2015 |
| Third round | 24 September 2015 (at De Kuip, Rotterdam) | 27–29 October 2015 |
| Round of 16 | 29 October 2015 (at the Rabobank IJmond Stadion, Velsen-Zuid) | 15–17 December 2015 |
| Quarter-finals | 17 December 2015 (at De Kuip, Rotterdam) | 2–4 February 2016 |
| Semi-finals | 4 February 2016 (at the Philips Stadion, Eindhoven) | 2 and 3 March 2016 |
| Final | 4 February 2016 (at the Philips Stadion, Eindhoven) | 24 April 2016 |

Source: Royal Dutch Football Association

== First round ==
Only amateur teams compete in this round. Matches were played on 26 August 2015. Due to heavy rainfall four matches were abandoned during the game and finished one week later on 2 September 2015

| WKE Emmen (3) | 3–0 | GVVV Veenendaal (3) | Emmen |
| Van der Voort 28' (o.g.); Eleveld 42'; Görtz 59' | | | Stadium: Sportpark Grote Geert; Attendance: 450; Referee: Martin Pérez |

| VV Dubbeldam (7) | 1–4 | DOVO (4) | Dordrecht |
| Van der Weijden 6' | | 11' Patrick; 72' Toonen; 75', 77' Raterink | Stadium: Sportpark Schenkeldijk; Attendance: 600; Referee: Merlijn Gerritsen |

| SC Genemuiden (4) | 4–0 | ZVV Zaanlandia (7) | Genemuiden |
| Martijn Jansen 19' 66'; Jasper Bremmer 35'; Erik Rotman 77' | | | Stadium: Sportpark de Wetering; Attendance: 750; Referee: Sam Dröge |

| Ter Leede (4) | 7–3 | LONGA '30 (5) | Sassenheim |
| Ammerlaan 2' 43' 74'; Verplancke 35' 63'; Schreurs 38'; Van der Kooye 50' | | 55' 90' Heinsbroek; 64' Klein Goldewijk | Stadium: Sportpark De Roodemolen; Attendance: 125; Referee: Clay Ruperti |

| VV Hoogland (5) | 0–3 | Rijnsburgse Boys (3) | Hoogland |
| | | 20' Leonard; 59' 66' Vlug | Stadium: Sportpark Langenoord; Attendance: 600; Referee: Gino d'Onorio |

| HSV Hoek (4) | 0–1 | EVV (3) | Hoek |
| | | 48' Beckers | Stadium: Sportpark Denoek; Attendance: 300; Referee: Colin Prooi |

| HSC '21 (3) | 2–1 (a.e.t.) | Excelsior Maassluis (3) | Haaksbergen |
| Postma 66' 103' | | 69' Vink | Stadium: Groot Scholtenhagen; Attendance: 422; Referee: Kevin Puts |

| Blauw Geel '38 (4) | 0–1 | SVV Scheveningen (3) | Veghel |
| | | 44' Goeman | Stadium: Prins Willem Alexander Sportpark; Attendance: 300; Referee: Lorenzo Cairo |

| FC Lisse (3) | 2–1 | RKSV Halsteren (4) | Lisse |
| Fokkema 12'; Buijs 78' | | 30' Bedaf | Stadium: Sportpark Ter Specke; Attendance: 250; Referee: Andy Wiemer |

| ONS Boso Sneek (3) | 3–2 (a.e.t.) | VC Vlissingen (4) | Sneek |
| Ramos 19'; De Wagt 79' 102' | | 24' Abdenbi; 31' Pinas | Stadium: Zuidersportpark; Attendance: 500; Referee: Tom Koekoek |

| OJC Rosmalen (3) | 2–2 (a.e.t.) (6–5 p) | Sparta Nijkerk (4) | Rosmalen |
| Huijgens 38'; De Jong 70' | | 5' 60' Tervoert | Stadium: Sportpark De Groote Wielen; Attendance: 600; Referee: Marcel Roeleveld |

| SC Feyenoord (amateurs) (6) | 2–1 | UNA (3) | Rotterdam |
| Obiku 2' 32' | | 77' Van de Gevel | Stadium: Sportcomplex Varkenoord; Attendance: 300; Referee: Sander van der Eijk |

| JSV Nieuwegein (5) | 1–3 | HBS (3) | Nieuwegein |
| Zwezerijnen 11' | | 2' (o.g.) Wright; 7' Samoender; 56' Koffeman | Stadium: Sportpark Galecop; Attendance: 200; Referee: Derya Serik |

| TEC (3) | 0–1 | VV Berkum (5) | Tiel |
| | | 48' Bacuna | Stadium: Sportpark De Lok; Attendance: 400; Referee: Alex van Kraay |

| Harkemase Boys (4) | 1–3 | De Treffers (3) | Harkema |
| Renken 54' | | 10' 84' Verbeek; 90+1' Maertzdorf | Stadium: Sportpark de Bosk; Attendance: 800; Referee: Davy Otto |

| SV Blerick (6) | 1–5 (a.e.t.) | vv Capelle (3) | Venlo |
| van Liempd 5' | | 30' 116' Van der Sande; 107' Blokland; 112' 120' Kleijn | Stadium: Sportpark 't Saorbrook; Attendance: 400; Referee: Roy Witlox |

| IJsselmeervogels (3) | 0–1 | Koninklijke HFC (3) | Spakenburg |
| | | 84' Opoku | Stadium: Sportpark De Westmaat; Attendance: 600; Referee: Richard Martens |

| USV Hercules (3) | 2–2 (a.e.t.) (3–4 p) | VV Noordwijk (4) | Utrecht |
| Fonfille 33'; Van Ojen 111' | | 11' Borsboom; 116' Wendt | Stadium: Sportpark Voordorp; Attendance: 500; Referee: Frank van den Elzen |

| RKSV Groene Ster (4) | 0–2 | ACV (4) | Heerlerheide |
| | | 45' De Vries; 83' Menting | Stadium: Sportpark Pronsebroek; Attendance: 300; Referee: Stijn Berben |

| Excelsior '31 (4) | 10–2 | SCM (7) | Rijssen |
| Köse 2' 57'; Pot 7' 34' 64'; Gerritsen 24' 29' 38' 73'; Ten Bolscher 87' | | 40' Willems; 45' Paulissen | Stadium: Sportpark de Koerbelt; Attendance: 300; Referee: Ingmar Oostrom |

| RKAVV (4) | 0–1 | VV Staphorst (4) | Leidschendam |
| | | 37' Kroes | Stadium: Sportpark Kastelenring; Attendance: 400; Referee: Paul van der Burg |

== Second round ==
Winners from the first round compete against all professional clubs.

| 22 September 2015 | SVV Scheveningen (3) | 0–0 (a.e.t.) (5–6 p) | Telstar (2) | Scheveningen |
| 17:00 | | | | Stadium: Sportpark Houtrust; Attendance: 500; Referee: Ingmar Oostrom |

| 22 September 2015 | vv Capelle (3) | 1–1 (a.e.t.) (5–4 p) | MVV Maastricht (2) | Capelle aan den IJssel |
| 17:00 | 45' Balrak | | 13' Labylle | Stadium: Sportpark 't Slot; Attendance: 650; Referee: Rob Dieperink |

| 22 September 2015 | OJC Rosmalen (3) | 3–4 (a.e.t.) | Sparta Rotterdam (2) | Rosmalen |
| 17:00 | 4' Scholts; 56' Geerts; 66' (pen.) Chraou | | 12' Stokkers; 20', 75' Verhaar; 115' Hiwat | Stadium: Sportpark De Groote Wielen; Attendance: 400; Referee: Davy Otto |

| 22 September 2015 | AFC (3) | 2–3 | FC Emmen (2) | Amsterdam |
| 17:00 | 60' Sutorius; 87' Jesse | | 11' Seip; 58' Gyasi; 78' Streutker | Stadium: Sportpark Goed Genoeg; Attendance: 300; Referee: Allard Lindhout |

| 22 September 2015 | NAC Breda (2) | 0–1 | Heerenveen (1) | Breda |
| 18:30 | | | 83' Veerman | Stadium: Rat Verlegh Stadion; Attendance: 6,200; Referee: Jeroen Manschot |

| 22 September 2015 | DOVO (4) | 0–3 | Willem II (1) | Veenendaal |
| 20:00 | | | 26', 72' Haemhouts; 88' De Sa | Stadium: Sportpark Het Panhuis; Attendance: 2,200; Referee: Edwin van de Graaf |

| 22 September 2015 | ONS Boso Sneek (3) | 0–2 | FC Utrecht (1) | Sneek |
| 20:00 | | | 3' Barazite; 90' Rubin | Stadium: Zuidersportpark; Attendance: 2,000; Referee: Pol Van Boekel |

| 22 September 2015 | SV Spakenburg (3) | 3–0 | Ter Leede (4) | Spakenburg |
| 20:00 | 24' Van der Wilt; 71' Gouriye; 90' Tol | | | Stadium: Sportpark De Westmaat; Attendance: 2,000; Referee: Tim Wesdorp |

| 22 September 2015 | ACV (4) | 1–2 | Excelsior '31 (4) | Assen |
| 20:00 | 24' De Jonge Rosa | | 65' Hempenius; 66' Mulkes | Stadium: Marsdijk; Attendance: 500; Referee: Christian Mulder |

| 22 September 2015 | Kozakken Boys (3) | 4–2 | VV Staphorst (4) | Werkendam |
| 20:00 | 7' Irilmazbilek; 15', 59' Eloisghiri; 68' Hammouti | | 29' Brakke; 72' Mijnheer | Stadium: Sportpark de Zwaaier; Attendance: 1,200; Referee: Sander van der Eijk |

| 22 September 2015 | EVV (3) | 0–3 | Almere City FC (2) | Echt |
| 20:00 | | | 25' Kip; 70' Braken; 89' Boldewijn | Stadium: Sportpark In De Bandert; Attendance: 450; Referee: Steven van der Vrande |

| 22 September 2015 | FC Lienden (3) | 1–0 | FC Volendam (2) | Lienden |
| 20:00 | 45' Grot | | | Stadium: Sportpark de Abdijhof; Attendance: 800; Referee: Martin Pérez |

| 22 September 2015 | VV Noordwijk (4) | 0–3 | NEC (1) | Noordwijk |
| 20:00 | | | 35' Santos; 54' Ritzmaier; 88' Rayhi | Stadium: Sportpark Duinwetering; Attendance: 871; Referee: Erwin Blank |

| 22 September 2015 | SC Genemuiden (4) | 3–3 (a.e.t.) (3–1 p) | ADO Den Haag (1) | Genemuiden |
| 20:00 | 42', 49' Van der Kolk; 100' Riemens | | 18' Gorré; 37' Havenaar; 120' Marengo | Stadium: Sportpark De Wetering; Attendance: 2,200; Referee: Christiaan Bax |

| 22 September 2015 | SC Feyenoord (amateurs) (6) | 0–2 | FC Dordrecht (2) | Rotterdam |
| 20:00 | | | 27' Janga; 42' Chacón | Stadium: Sportcomplex Valkenoord; Attendance: 800; Referee: Karel van den Heuvel |

| 22 September 2015 | FC Lisse (3) | 0–4 | HHC Hardenberg (3) | Lisse |
| 20:00 | | | 31', 87' Hooiveld; 60' Werkman; 78' Philip Ties | Stadium: Sportpark Ter Specke; Attendance: 400; Referee: Sander de Brito Roque |

| 22 September 2015 | PSV (1) | 3–2 | SC Cambuur (1) | Eindhoven |
| 20:45 | 16' Locadia; 43' (o.g.) Heerings; 78' (pen.) De Jong | | 66', 69' (pen.) Ogbeche | Stadium: Philips Stadion; Attendance: 14,500; Referee: Dennis Higler |

| 23 September 2015 | Koninklijke HFC (3) | 3–2 | FC Eindhoven (2) | Haarlem |
| 16:00 | 52' Tamerus; 60' El Yaakoubi; 63' Van den Ban | | 36' Massop; 76' Vink | Stadium: Complex Spanjaardslaan; Referee: Van Herk |

| 23 September 2015 | HSC '21 (3) | 2–2 (a.e.t.) (9–10 p) | Go Ahead Eagles (2) | Haaksbergen |
| 17:00 | 52' Ter Hogt; 66' Grondman | | 62' David; 78' Teijsse | Stadium: Groot Scholtenhagen; Referee: Björn Kuipers |

| 23 September 2015 | Rijnsburgse Boys (3) | 3–3 (a.e.t.) (5–6 p) | VVSB (3) | Rijnsburg |
| 17:00 | 10' Wijks; 90+2' Hessing; 110' Ignacio | | 52', 67' Van Niel; 99' Van der Slot | Stadium: Sportpark Middelmors; Referee: Laurens Gerrets |

| 23 September 2015 | HBS (3) | 4–1 | FC Oss (2) | The Hague |
| 17:00 | 14', 49' De Geer; 28' Westdijk; 79' Six | | 25' Bakx | Stadium: Sportpark Craeyenhout; Referee: Martin Van Den Kerkhof |

| 23 September 2015 | FC Groningen (1) | 2–1 | FC Twente (1) | Groningen |
| 18:30 | 53' Linssen; 60' Maduro | | 21' Ter Avest | Stadium: Euroborg; Attendance: 13,605; Referee: Kevin Blom |

| 23 September 2015 | AZ (1) | 6–1 | VVV Venlo (2) | Alkmaar |
| 20:00 | 8' Van der Linden; 37' Tanković; 70' Mühren; 78', 80', 82' Henriksen | | 69' Van Crooy | Stadium: AFAS Stadion; Attendance: 7,188; Referee: Richard Liesveld |

| 23 September 2015 | Heracles Almelo (1) | 4–1 (a.e.t.) | Vitesse (1) | Almelo |
| 20:00 | 90+4' Gosens; 94' (pen.) Tannane; 104' Gladon; 114' Weghorst | | 17' Oliynyk | Stadium: Polman Stadion; Attendance: 10,587; Referee: Danny Makkelie |

| 23 September 2015 | Fortuna Sittard (2) | 1–3 (a.e.t.) | Achilles '29 (2) | Sittard |
| 20:00 | 39' Hutten | | 10' Hielke Penterman; 94' Sürmeli; 108' Boogers | Stadium: Fortuna Sittard Stadion; Attendance: 1,130; Referee: Higler |

| 23 September 2015 | VV Berkum (5) | 4–4 (a.e.t.) (5–3 p) | JVC Cuijk (3) | Zwolle |
| 20:00 | 38' Wellenberg; 65' Bacuna; 101' Kok; 115' Van der Meulen | | 53', 112', 118' Zaimi; 85' Eind | Stadium: Sportpark de Vegtlust; Referee: Joey Kooij |

| 23 September 2015 | BVV Barendrecht (3) | 0–2 | Excelsior (1) | Barendrecht |
| 20:00 | | | 3' Van Weert; 90+1' Van Mieghem | Stadium: Sportpark de Bongerd; Referee: Serdar Gözübüyük |

| 23 September 2015 | WKE Emmen (3) | 2–5 (a.e.t.) | FC Den Bosch (2) | Emmen |
| 20:00 | 36', 66' Albertus | | 11', 65', 100' Jordy Thomassen; 104' Havar; 106' Boddaert | Stadium: Sportpark Grote Geert; Referee: Siemen Mulder |

| 23 September 2015 | De Treffers (3) | 0–3 | Roda JC (1) | Groesbeek |
| 20:00 | | | 40' Faik; 55' Juric; 79' Van Hyfte | Stadium: Sportpark Zuid; Referee: Ed Janssen |

| 23 September 2015 | Ajax (1) | 2–0 | De Graafschap (1) | Amsterdam |
| 20:45 | 41' Fischer; 85' Heitinga | | | Stadium: Amsterdam Arena; Attendance: 24,738; Referee: Jochem Kamphuis |

| 24 September 2015 | RKC Waalwijk (2) | 1–2 | Helmond Sport (2) | Waalwijk |
| 18:30 | Cicilia 37' | | De Reuver 45'; Van de Sande 83' | Stadium: Mandemakers Stadion; Attendance: 1,200; Referee: Richard Martens |

| 24 September 2015 | Feyenoord (1) | 3–0 | PEC Zwolle (1) | Rotterdam |
| 20:45 | Marcellis 19' (o.g.); Kuyt 60', 69' | | | Stadium: De Kuip; Attendance: 47,500; Referee: Bas Nijhuis |

== Third round ==
The 32 winners from the previous round progress to this stage.

| 27 October 2015 | PSV (1) | 6–0 | SC Genemuiden (4) | Eindhoven |
| 18:30 | De Jong 8'; Pereiro 61', 63', 86'; Pröpper 65'; Moreno 68' | | | Stadium: Philips Stadion; Attendance: 31,000; Referee: Allard Lindhout |

| 27 October 2015 | Heracles Almelo (1) | 3–1 | Koninklijke HFC (3) | Almelo |
| 20:00 | Gladon 18'; Breukers 61'; Bel Hassani 83' | | 26' Den Hartigh | Stadium: Polman Stadion; Attendance: 8,011; Referee: Edwin de Graaf |

| 27 October 2015 | Almere City FC (2) | 0–3 | FC Den Bosch (2) | Almere |
| 20:00 | | | 6' Zeldenrust; 54' Pozder; 90' Esajas | Stadium: Yanmar Stadion; Attendance: 1,276; Referee: Christiaan Bax |

| 27 October 2015 | VV Berkum (5) | 0–3 | HHC Hardenberg (3) | Zwolle |
| 20:00 | | | 29', 52' Van der Leij; 43' Krohne | Stadium: Sportpark De Vegtlust; Attendance: 600; Referee: Ed Janssen |

| 27 October 2015 | Achilles '29 (2) | 2–1 | SV Spakenburg (3) | Groesbeek |
| 20:00 | Dingil 16'; Van Straaten 68' | | 90' Van den Meiracker | Stadium: Sportpark De Heikant; Attendance: 1,913; Referee: Jochem Kamphuis |

| 27 October 2015 | FC Dordrecht (2) | 0–1 (a.e.t.) | vv Capelle (3) | Dordrecht |
| 20:00 | | | 112' Pattinama | Stadium: GN Bouw Stadion; Attendance: 2,243; Referee: Jeroen Manschot |

| 27 October 2015 | VVSB (3) | 3–1 | FC Emmen (2) | Katwijk |
| 20:00 | Ruigrok 13'; Van Niel 59'; Bekooij 87' | | 63' Mannes | Stadium: Sportpark Nieuw Zuid; Attendance: 1,000; Referee: Christian Mulder |

| 27 October 2015 | Go Ahead Eagles (2) | 0–2 | Willem II (1) | Deventer |
| 20:45 | | | 66', 72' Zivkovic | Stadium: De Adelaarshorst; Attendance: 1,278; Referee: Bas Nijhuis |

| 28 October 2015 | HBS (3) | 1–2 | Kozakken Boys (3) | The Hague |
| 18:30 | Westdijk 5' | | 16' Bot; 36' Grot | Stadium: Sportpark Craeyenhout; Attendance: 800; Referee: Martin van den Kerkhof |

| 28 October 2015 | Feyenoord (1) | 1–0 | Ajax (1) | Rotterdam |
| 19:45 | Veltman 90+5' (o.g.) | | | Stadium: De Kuip; Attendance: 47,500; Referee: Pol van Boekel |

| 28 October 2015 | FC Lienden (3) | 1–1 (a.e.t.) (5–6 p) | Roda JC (1) | Lienden |
| 20:00 | Broekhof 81' | | 84' Van Hyfte | Stadium: Sportpark de Abdijhof; Attendance: 2,400; Referee: Karel van den Heuvel |

| 28 October 2015 | Excelsior '31 (4) | 4–3 | Excelsior (1) | Rijssen |
| 20:00 | Köse 24'; Patrick Gerritsen 30', 60'; Ezafzafi 88' | | 7', 10', 64' Van Weert | Stadium: Sportpark De Koerbelt; Attendance: 1,750; Referee: Björn Kuipers |

| 28 October 2015 | FC Utrecht (1) | 5–3 (a.e.t.) | FC Groningen (1) | Utrecht |
| 20:45 | Ramselaar 1'; Diemers 55'; Ayoub 80'; Barazite 97'; Peterson 100' | | 34' De Leeuw; 47' Linssen; 82' Drost | Stadium: Stadion Galgenwaard; Attendance: 14,503; Referee: Richard Liesveld |

| 29 October 2015 | NEC (1) | 4–0 | Sparta Rotterdam (2) | Nijmegen |
| 18:30 | Breinburg 4', 22'; Foor 54'; Santos 89' | | | Stadium: Stadion de Goffert; Attendance: 6,003; Referee: Eric Braamhaar |

| 29 October 2015 | Heerenveen (1) | 1–0 | Helmond Sport (2) | Heerenveen |
| 20:00 | Veerman 45' | | | Stadium: Abe Lenstra Stadion; Attendance: 11,515; Referee: Siemen Mulder |

| 29 October 2015 | Telstar (2) | 0–1 | AZ (1) | Velsen |
| 20:45 | | | 68' Van Overeem | Stadium: TATA Steel Stadion; Attendance: 3,200; Referee: Dennis Higler |

== Fourth round ==
The 16 winners from the previous round progress to this stage.

| 15 December 2015 | HHC Hardenberg (3) | 2–0 | NEC (1) | Hardenberg |
| 18:30 | Kobussen 48'; Krohne 78' | | | Stadium: Sportpark De Boshoek; Attendance: 3,000; Referee: Danny Makkelie |

| 15 December 2015 | Excelsior '31 (4) | 1–3 | FC Den Bosch (2) | Rijssen |
| 20:00 | Vosskuhler 37' | | Slivka 10'; Zeldenrust 59' (pen.); Bodaert 75' | Stadium: Sportpark De Koerbelt; Attendance: 1,500; Referee: Martin van den Kerkhof |

| 15 December 2015 | Roda JC (1) | 3–1 | Heerenveen (1) | Kerkrade |
| 20:45 | Juric 18', 26' (pen.); Ngombo 89' | | Van Peppen 66' (o.g.) | Stadium: Parkstad Limburg Stadion; Attendance: 7,258; Referee: Kevin Blom |

| 16 December 2015 | Achilles '29 (2) | 0–5 | FC Utrecht (1) | Groesbeek |
| 18:30 | | | Haller 5', 48', 50'; Barazite 8'; Joosten 64' | Stadium: Sportpark De Heikant; Referee: Dennis Higler |

| 16 December 2015 | Kozakken Boys (3) | 1–3 | AZ (1) | Werkendam |
| 19:45 | Jongeneel 72' | | Gouweleeuw 41' (pen.), 83' (pen.); Mühren 88' | Stadium: Sportpark De Zwaaier; Attendance: 4,400; Referee: Siemen Mulder |

| 16 December 2015 | vv Capelle (3) | 2–3 | VVSB (3) | Rotterdam |
| 20:00 | van der Sande 33'; Balrak 89' | | Jozic 49'; Parami 70'; Serbony 78' | Stadium: Stadion Woudestein; Attendance: 2,800; Referee: Christiaan Bax |

| 16 December 2015 | Heracles Almelo (1) | 2–3 | PSV Eindhoven (1) | Almelo |
| 20:00 | Bel Hassani 18'; Tannane 50' | | Locadia 36', 90+1'; Castro 69' (o.g.) | Stadium: Polman Stadion; Attendance: 7,874; Referee: Björn Kuipers |

| 17 December 2015 | Feyenoord (1) | 2–1 (a.e.t.) | Willem II (1) | Rotterdam |
| 20:45 | Vilhena 88'; Kuyt 119' (pen.) | | Andersen 25' | Stadium: De Kuip; Attendance: 47,500; Referee: Ed Janssen |

== Quarter-finals ==
The 8 winners from the previous round progress to this stage.

| 2 February 2016 | AZ (1) | 1–0 | HHC Hardenberg (3) | Alkmaar |
| 20:45 | Janssen 9' | | | Stadium: AFAS Stadion; Attendance: 7,623; Referee: Pol van Boekel |

| 3 February 2016 | FC Den Bosch (2) | 2–3 | VVSB (3) | 's-Hertogenbosch |
| 18:30 | Carlone 21'; Khalouta 31' | | Bekooy 82'; Van der Slot 83'; Parami 87' | Stadium: De Vliert; Attendance: 5,266; Referee: Jochem Kamphuis |

| 3 February 2016 | Roda JC (1) | 0–1 (a.e.t.) | Feyenoord (1) | Kerkrade |
| 20:45 | | | Botteghin 105' | Stadium: Parkstad Limburg Stadion; Attendance: 12,595; Referee: Ed Janssen |

| 4 February 2016 | PSV (1) | 1–3 | FC Utrecht (1) | Eindhoven |
| 20:45 | Leeuwin 74' (o.g.) | | Ramselaar 32', 58'; Haller 41' | Stadium: Philips Stadion; Attendance: 20,000; Referee: Richard Liesveld |

== Semi-finals ==
The 4 winners from the previous round progress to this stage.

| 2 March 2016 | FC Utrecht (1) | 3–0 | VVSB (3) | Utrecht |
| 20:45 | Van der Slot 73' (o.g.); Haller 75'; Joosten 90+1' | | | Stadium: Stadion Galgenwaard; Attendance: 23,750; Referee: Dennis Higler |

| 3 March 2016 | Feyenoord (1) | 3–1 | AZ (1) | Rotterdam |
| 20:45 | Henriksen 15' (o.g.); Kramer 78'; Kuyt 85' (pen.) | | Henriksen 46' | Stadium: Stadion Feijenoord; Attendance: 47,500; Referee: Danny Makkelie |

== Final ==
The 2 winners from the previous round progressed to the final. The winner of the semi-final match between Feyenoord and AZ is marked as the 'home' team in the final, as that was the first match to be drawn at the draw for the semi-finals.

24 April 2016
18:00

| Feyenoord | 2–1 | FC Utrecht |
|---|---|---|
| Kramer 42'; Bednarek 75' (o.g.) | | Leeuwin 51' |

De Kuip, Rotterdam
Attendance: 45,592
