= Grot =

Grot may refer to:

== People ==
- Anton Grot (1884–1974), a Polish art director
- Denis Grot (born 1984), Belarusian ice hockey player
- Guillano Grot (born 1983), a Dutch footballer
- Jan Grot, the bishop of Kraków from 1326 to 1347
- Jay-Roy Grot (born 1998), Surinamese footballer
- Philipp Grot Johann (1841–1892), a German illustrator
- Sherwin Grot (born 1990), a Dutch footballer
- Stefan Grot-Rowecki (1895–1944), or Grot, pseudonym of the Polish general and journalist Stefan Paweł Rowecki
- Sylvia Grot, American politician
- Yakov Grot (1812–1893), 19th-century Russian philologist

== Places ==
- Grot (mountain), mountain in Serbia
- Grotto, a shortened form. This use is chiefly literary
- The Grot, a summer house in the grounds of Rydal Hall in England's Lake District

== Transport ==
- Grot-Rowecki, a freighter named after Stefan Rowecki, which collided with a tanker in the English Channel
- PZL TS-16 Grot, a Polish warplane

== Other ==
- Grotto
- Grot, a fictional business in the British sitcom The Fall and Rise of Reginald Perrin
- "Get Rid Of Them", a tactical voter campaign in the 1997 United Kingdom general election
- Polish FB MSBS Grot assault rifle

== See also ==
- Grote (disambiguation)
- Grotte (disambiguation)
