= Patrick Gerritsen =

Dutch footballer (born 1987)

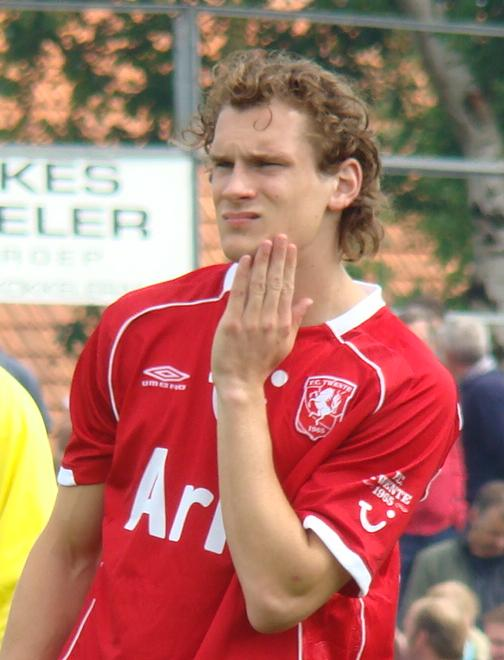
- Gerritsen with Twente in 2008

Personal information
- Date of birth: 13 March 1987 (age 39)
- Place of birth: Oldenzaal, Netherlands
- Height: 1.82 m (6 ft 0 in)
- Position: Striker

Youth career
- DSVD Deurningen
- Twente

Senior career*
Years	Team	Apps	(Gls)
2005–2011	Twente	28	(6)
2009–2011	→ Go Ahead Eagles (loan)	46	(7)
2011–2012	Go Ahead Eagles	18	(2)
2012–2017	Excelsior '31	34	(11)
Total		173	(34)

International career
2005	Netherlands U19	3	(0)
2006	Netherlands U21	2	(0)
Medal record
Men's football
Representing Netherlands
UEFA European Under-21 Championship
Winner	2006 Portugal
- * Club domestic league appearances and goals

Patrick Gerritsen (Dutch pronunciation: [ˈpɛtrɪk ˈxɛrɪtsə(n)]; born 13 March 1987) is a Dutch retired footballer who played as a striker.

A prospect of the Twente youth academy, Gerritsen made his breakthrough in the 2005–06 season. He would, however, be affected by several long-term injuries in the following seasons and then spent two seasons on loan with second-tier Eerste Divisie club Go Ahead Eagles, before signing a permanent deal in 2011. Between 2012 and 2017, Gerritsen played for lower league club Excelsior '31.

Gerritsen has represented the Netherlands at under-21 level.

== Club career ==
=== Twente ===
Gerritsen moved to the youth academy of FC Twente after being scouted at his hometown youth club DSVD Deurningen. He made his professional debut for Twente on 2 October 2005 as a 90th-minute substitute for Sharbel Touma in an away match against local rivals Heracles Almelo, which his club won 0–4. He scored his first senior goal in his third appearance of the season – which also proved to be the decisive goal – in a 1–0 home win over Sparta Rotterdam on 30 November 2005. After having been subbed in for Touma in the 73rd minute, Gerritsen headed home the winner in injury time on a cross from Kennedy Bakircioglu. On 17 December, he scored his second goal for Twente in a 3–1 away loss to Heerenveen, in what was also his first ever start for the team. Gerritsen eventually made 24 appearances in his first season, of which nineteen were starts, and he scored six goals. The season finished in 7th place for Twente, as they could still qualify for European football through the UEFA Intertoto Cup.

On 15 July 2006, Gerritsen made his European debut as a starter in a 1–0 loss in the Intertoto Cup to Swedish club Kalmar FF. In the second leg, however, Twente turned around the tie and beat Kalmar 3–1 at home, thereby qualifying for the UEFA Cup. Gerritsen also made a start in the second leg, as midfielder Touma scored a hat-trick. In the league, Gerritsen saw a decrease in playing time under new head coach Fred Rutten, as he preferred to play Blaise Nkufo as the sole striker. In a match on 25 September 2006 between Jong FC Twente against Jong SC Heerenveen, Gerritsen suffered a double fracture in his leg and was therefore sidelined for almost eight months. He made his comeback during the play-offs at the end of the 2006–07 season, coming on as a late substitute for Otman Bakkal in a 2–0 loss to AZ.

In preparation for the following season, he broke his leg again, leaving him out until the winter break. Gerritsen returned to the first team in March 2008.

On 13 August 2008, he made his debut in the UEFA Champions League, coming on as a substitute in the 90th minute for Marko Arnautović in a 0–2 home loss to Arsenal. However, he was usually a reserve behind fellow strikers Nkufo, Arnautović and Kenneth Perez under new head coach Steve McClaren and mainly played for the second team, Jong Twente. He was on trial at English club Preston North End in December 2008, without this amounting to a permanent move. At that point, his last match in the Eredivisie had been more than two years earlier. On 25 April 2009, Gerritsen made his return to the Eredivisie in a match between Twente and Heerenveen.

=== Go Ahead Eagles ===
On 18 June 2009, Twente sent Gerritsen on loan to Go Ahead Eagles for the 2009–10 season. At the same time, his contract with Twente was extended by one year. He made his debut for the club in the second-tier Eerste Divisie as a starter in the 2–0 home win over FC Omniworld, as fellow striker Halil Çolak scored a brace to secure the victory. On 23 September, Gerritsen scored his first goal for the club in extra time of the KNVB Cup second round win over lower league side Rijnsburgse Boys. He played a total of 25 games for the Deventer-based club and scored five goals. That season, Go Ahead finished 5th in the league table and made it all the way to the semi-finals of the KNVB Cup, where they were eventually knocked out by Ajax. In the play-offs for promotion, the club stranded in the finals where Willem II secured another season in the Eredivisie. Gerritsen appeared as a substitute in the second leg, replacing Çolak in the 65th minute.

The loan was extended by one year in 2010. He remained a starter in his second stint with Go Ahead, making 28 total appearances in which he scored five goals, as the team finished 7th in the league, and were knocked out of the promotion play-offs by FC Den Bosch in the first round.

At the end of his contract with Twente in 2011, Gerritsen was signed permanently by Go Ahead Eagles on a free transfer, penning a one-year contract. In the 2011–12 season, he would make 23 total appearances, of which only six were in the starting lineup, as new head coach Joop Gall preferred Jarchinio Antonia and Marnix Kolder in his position. Gerritsen was even utilised at right back in a 2–2 draw against Almere City on 9 December 2011 due to injuries to other players. Go Ahead Eagles snuck into the play-offs on goal difference that season, but again fell short to Den Bosch in the first round. Already in February 2012, Gerritsen had been told by technical director Marc Overmars that his expiring contract would not be renewed.

=== Excelsior '31 ===
In March 2012, it was announced that Gerritsen would move to Excelsior '31, who were competing in the Topklasse. He would struggle with injuries during his first period at the club, as they suffered relegation to the Hoofdklasse in May 2014 after a 2–4 home loss to IJsselmeervogels.

Despite frequent injuries and relegation, Gerritsen extended his contract by one year in October 2015. With Excelsior '31, Gerritsen would, however, experience a successful cup run, reaching the round of 16 of the 2015–16 KNVB Cup, a tournament in which he became the top goalscorer with five goals. He scored four of the five goals in the first round against VV SCM, as Excelsior '31 won 10–2. In December 2015, he signed another one-year contract extension with the club.

Gerritsen announced his retirement from football in May 2017.

== International career ==
In 2006, he was part of the Netherlands squad that won the UEFA U21 Championship 2006 in Portugal.

== Retirement ==
Gerritsen has a degree in accounting from Nyenrode Business University and has worked as a senior-assistant accountant for de Jong & Laan after his retirement from professional football. He has also played for his youth club DSVD since retiring, a club competing in the Derde Klasse. There, fellow former professional player, Mark-Jan Fledderus is also part of the first team.

== Career statistics ==
Club	Season	League			Cup		Continental		Other		Total	
Club	Season	Division	Apps	Goals	Apps	Goals	Apps	Goals	Apps	Goals	Apps	Goals
Twente	2005–06	Eredivisie	24	6	1	0	—		6 (Note: Appearances in the Eredivisie European play-offs)	2	31	8
Twente	2006–07	Eredivisie	3	0	0	0	3 (Note: Appearances in the UEFA Intertoto Cup and UEFA Cup)	0	1	0	7	0
Twente	2007–08	Eredivisie	0	0	0	0	—		—		0	0
Twente	2008–09	Eredivisie	1	0	0	0	1 (Note: Appearance in the UEFA Champions League)	0	—		2	0
Twente	Total		28	6	1	0	4	0	7	2	40	8
Go Ahead Eagles (loan)	2009–10	Eerste Divisie	22	3	1	1	—		2 (Note: Appearances in the promotion/relegation play-offs)	0	25	4
Go Ahead Eagles (loan)	2010–11	Eerste Divisie	24	4	2	1	—		2	0	28	5
Go Ahead Eagles	2011–12	Eerste Divisie	18	2	3	0	—		2	0	23	2
Go Ahead Eagles	Total		64	9	6	2	—		6	0	76	11
Career total			92	15	7	2	4	0	13	2	116	19

== Honours ==
Netherlands U21

- UEFA European Under-21 Football Championship: 2006

Individual

- KNVB Cup Golden Boot: 2015–16
