= Junior Albertus =

Dutch professional footballer

Personal information
- Date of birth: 25 December 1996 (age 29)
- Place of birth: Willemstad, Curaçao
- Height: 1.78 m (5 ft 10 in)
- Position: Forward

Team information
- Current team: SCO '63

Youth career
- Vitesse
- NEC
- –2014: Feyenoord
- 2015: Emmen

Senior career*
Years	Team	Apps	(Gls)
2015–2016	WKE	19	(8)
2016–2017	Emmen	1	(0)
2017	→ HHC Hardenberg (loan)	16	(1)
2017–2018	Sparta Nijkerk	18	(8)
2018–2020	HBSS		
2020–2021	HVV Tubantia		
2021–2024	Excelsior '20		
2024–	SCO '63		

International career
2013	Netherlands U18	2	(0)
- * Club domestic league appearances and goals as of 29 November 2020

Junior Albertus (born 25 December 1996) is a Dutch footballer who plays as a forward for Dutch club SCO '63.

== Club career ==
After brief stints in the Vitesse and N.E.C. youth systems, Albertus found early success at Feyenoord, making his U19 team debut at the age of 16.

In May 2015, he signed with FC Emmen, and spent the rest of the 2014/15 season with their U19 team. He was called up to the first team in July, but did not end up signing a professional contract because he was deemed overweight at the first team training session. Instead, he signed with local fourth division club WKE. In his only season at WKE, he scored 8 goals in 19 matches.

Albertus was released from his contract (along with the rest of his teammates) in early 2016 after the club went bankrupt and dropped out of the league. He initially signed a contract with semi-pro club Kozakken Boys in March. However, after noticing his weight loss, he was bought back by FC Emmen in May, taking advantage of a clause in the Kozakken contract allowing them to offer him a more lucrative contract. He made his professional debut on 12 August 2016, during a 1–0 victory over RKC Waalwijk. He came on as a 78' sub for Issa Kallon.

He later played for amateur sides Tubantia, Excelsior '20, and SCO '63.

== International career ==
Albertus earned two caps with the Netherlands national under-18 team in 2013 during a four-team friendly tournament in Turkey. He came off the bench in matches against Turkey and Czech Republic.
