= Tim Siekman =

Dutch footballer (born 1990)

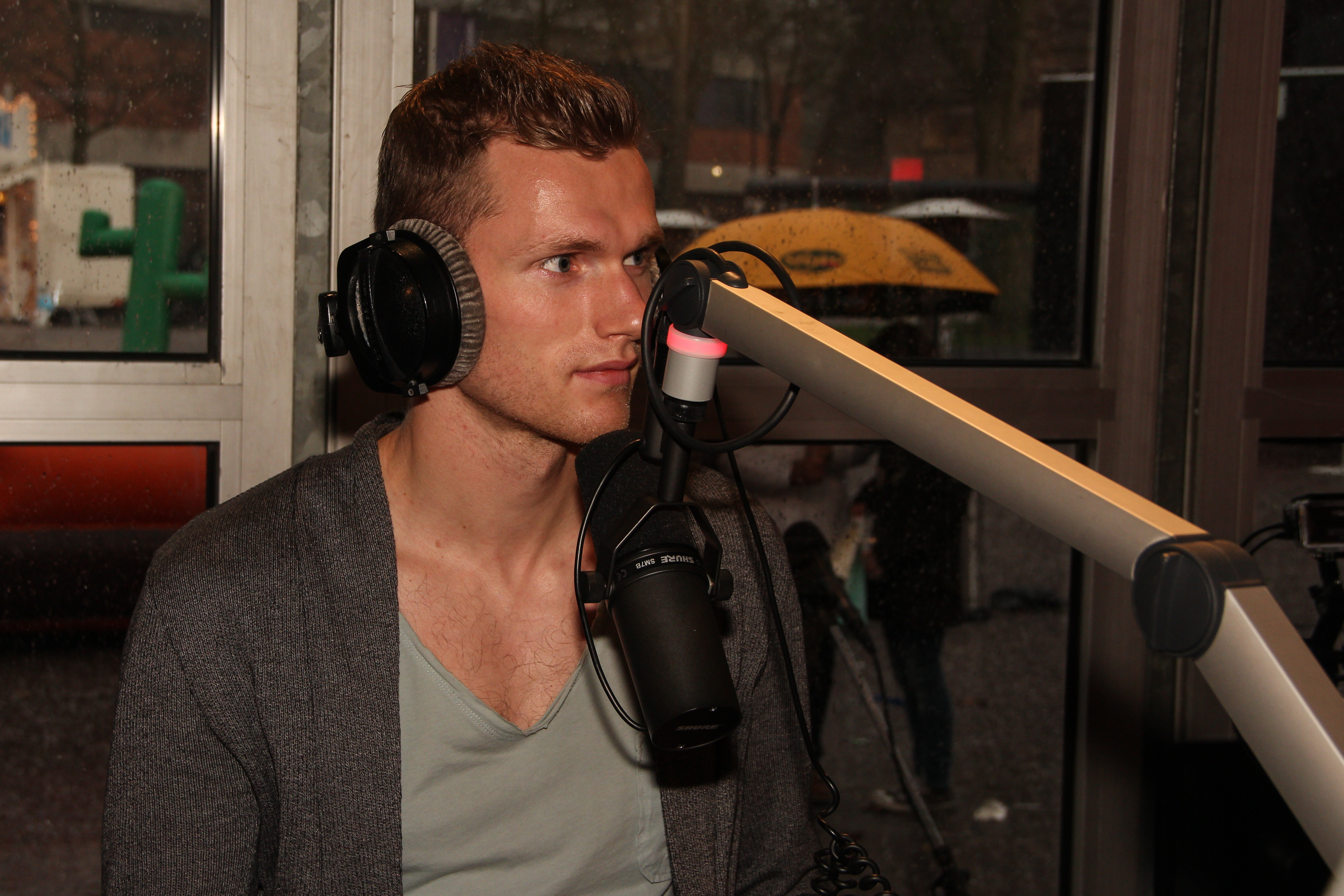
- Siekman in 2014

Personal information
- Date of birth: 25 May 1990 (age 36)
- Place of birth: Emmen, Netherlands
- Height: 1.87 m (6 ft 2 in)
- Position: Centre-back

Youth career
- 1997–2001: SVBO
- 2001–2008: FC Emmen

Senior career*
Years	Team	Apps	(Gls)
2008–2010	FC Emmen	9	(0)
2010–2013	HHC Hardenberg	74	(6)
2013–2019	FC Emmen	152	(15)
2019–2020	Lommel	14	(0)
2020–2021	HHC Hardenberg	5	(0)
Total		254	(21)
- * Club domestic league appearances and goals

Tim Siekman (born 25 May 1990) is a Dutch former professional footballer who played as a centre-back.

== Career ==
While looking for a new club, Siekman kept training with FC Emmen although his contract had expired. On 4 September 2019, Siekman joined Belgian club Lommel SK.

In April 2020, Siekman returned to HHC Hardenberg, a club he had formerly represented between 2010 and 2013. He announced his retirement from football in April 2021.
