= Bart Ramselaar =

Dutch footballer (born 1996)

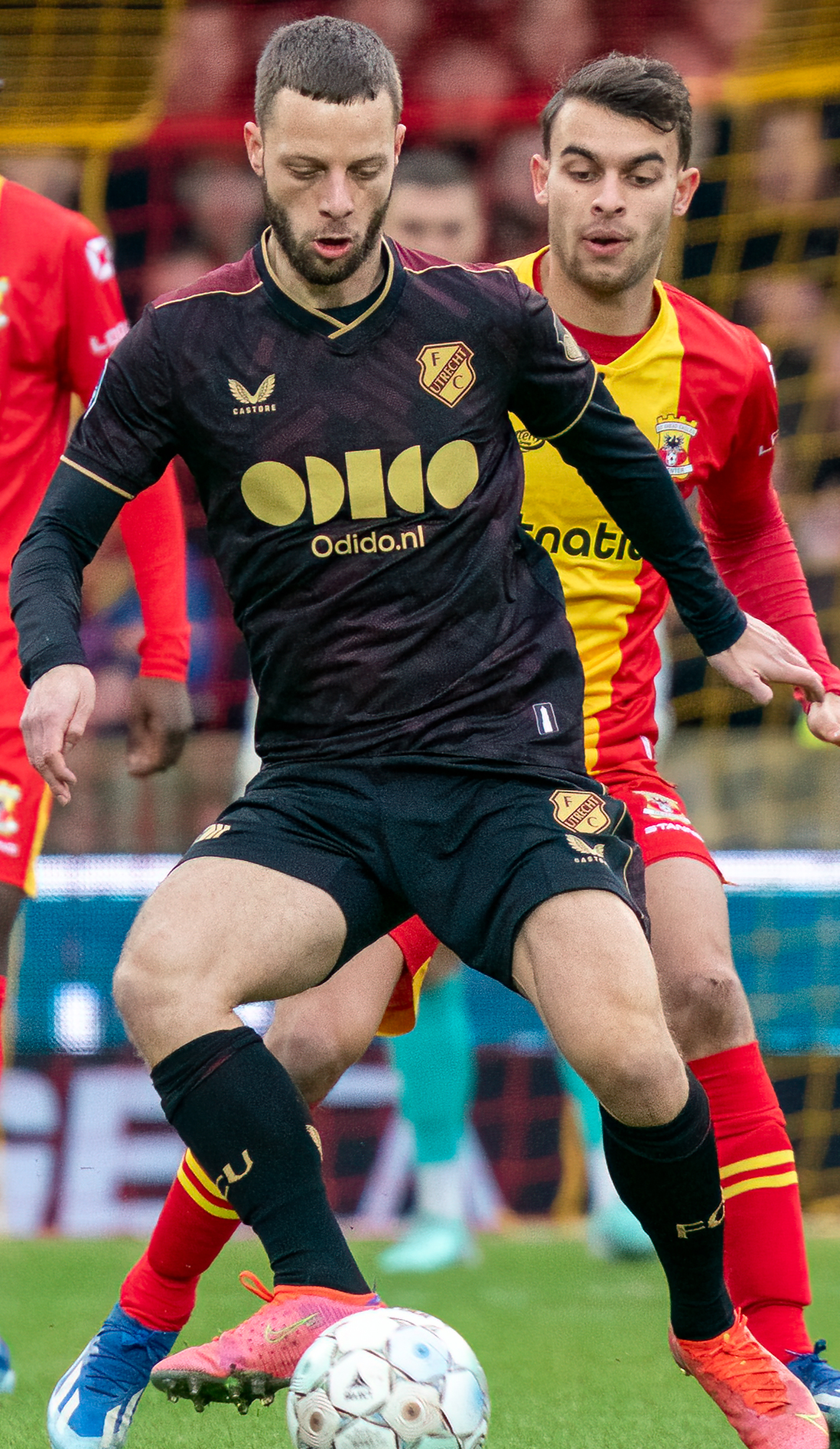
- Ramselaar with Utrecht in 2023

Personal information
- Date of birth: 29 June 1996 (age 30)
- Place of birth: Amersfoort, Netherlands
- Height: 1.78 m (5 ft 10 in)
- Positions: Attacking midfielder; winger

Team information
- Current team: Lion City Sailors
- Number: 10

Youth career
- VVZA
- Roda '46
- 2010–2015: Utrecht

Senior career*
Years	Team	Apps	(Gls)
2015–2016	Utrecht	44	(7)
2016–2019	PSV	62	(6)
2018–2019	Jong PSV	9	(4)
2019–2024	Utrecht	93	(19)
2024–	Lion City Sailors	44	(19)

International career
2014	Netherlands U19	2	(0)
2015	Netherlands U20	3	(0)
2016–2018	Netherlands U21	16	(3)
2016–2017	Netherlands	3	(0)
- * Club domestic league appearances and goals as of 25 October 2026

Bart Ramselaar (born 29 June 1996) is a Dutch professional footballer who plays either as an attacking-midfielder or winger for Singapore Premier League club Lion City Sailors.

== Club career ==
=== Utrecht ===
At Utrecht, Ramselaar quickly became known as a great talent. He went through all the senior youth teams there and made his debut in the Eredivisie against Feyenoord on 1 March 2015. Ramselaar scored his first goal on 17 May 2015 in the 3–3 draw away match against Vitesse. On 2 February 2016, he scored a brace during the 2015–16 KNVB Cup quarter-finals against PSV where his team advance to the semi-finals. Ramselaar also played the entire match in the 2016 KNVB Cup final but see the team finished as runner-ups.

=== PSV ===
In August 2016, PSV reach agreement to sign Ramselaar from Utrecht, putting pen to paper on a five-year contract. The transfer fee was rumored to be for around €5 million. Ramselaar made his debut on 28 August 2016 in a goalless draw in the home game against Groningen. He make his UEFA Champions League debut in a 1–0 lost to Atletico Madrid on 13 September.

On 15 April 2018, he came off the bench as PSV beat rivals Ajax 3–0 to clinch the 2017–18 Eredivisie title.

=== Return to Utrecht ===
On 24 August 2019, Ramselaar returned to Utrecht where he was deemed surplus to requirements by PSV manager, Mark van Bommel. On 15 December, he scored a brace in a 3–1 win over Heracles Almelo.

On 31 October 2021, Ramselaar scored his first professional career hat-trick in a 5–1 league win over Willem II.

Ramselaar made 11 appearances in his final Eredivisie season – scoring in his side's 2–0 victory over Go Ahead Eagles in December 2024 – before moving to Singapore to join the Sailors.

=== Lion City Sailors ===
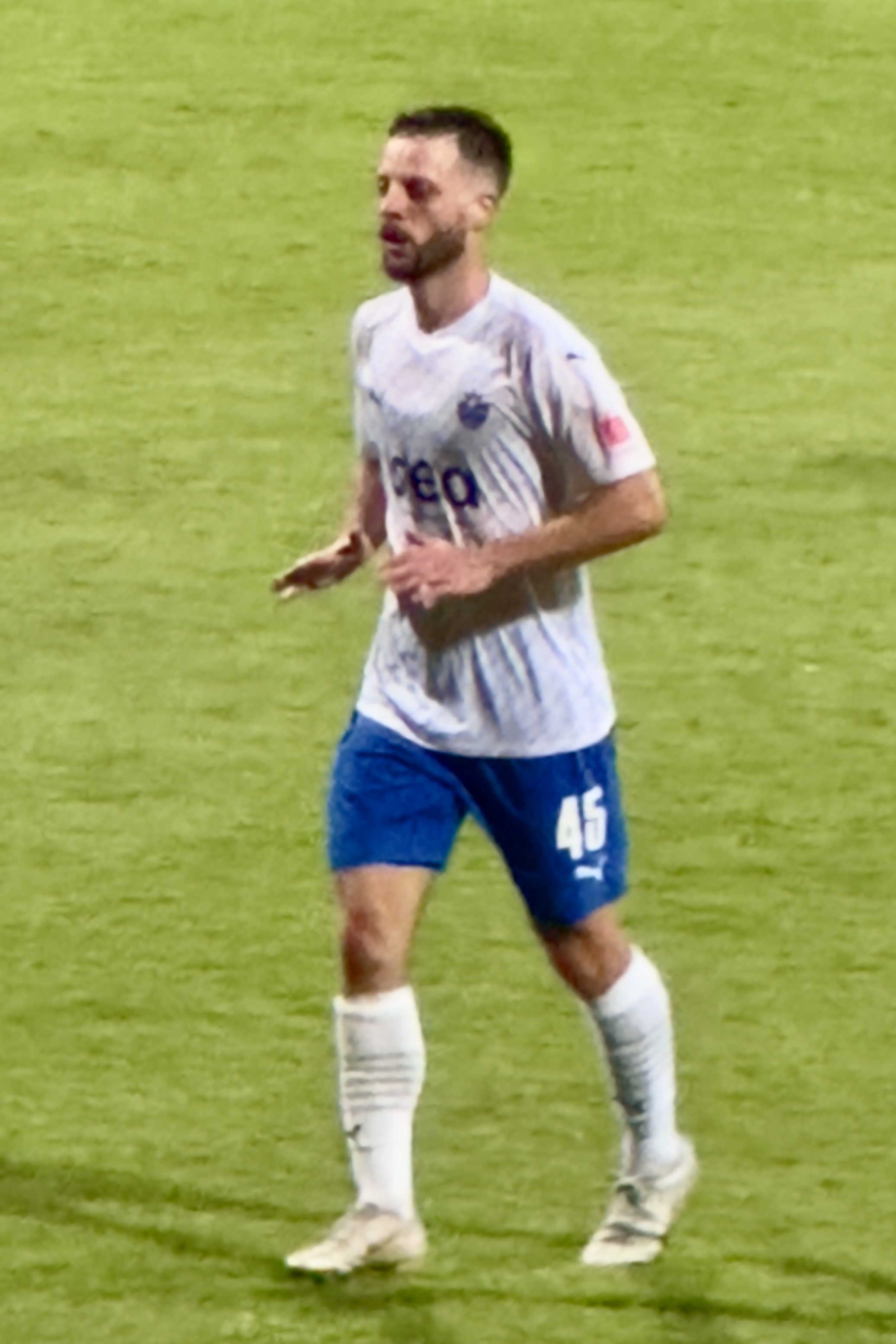
Ramselaar with Lion City Sailors in 2024

On 26 February 2024, Ramselaar moved to Southeast Asia to join Singapore Premier League side, Lion City Sailors, reuniting with his former Utrecht assistant coach, Aleksandar Ranković at the club. His move to Singapore became the second most expensive signing in the league's history for a reported fee of about €1.5 million (SGD$2.2 million). On his official debut for the club on 4 May 2024, he helped his club to win the 2024 Singapore Community Shield in a 2–0 win against Albirex Niigata (S) also making his debut in Singapore football. On 10 May, Ramselaar scored his first goal for the club in the opening league match of the 2024–25 season against Hougang United in a 4–1 win. On 23 June, He scored a brace in a 7–1 thrashing win over Albirex Niigata (S). On 16 March 2025, Ramselaar scored a hat-trick in a 4–1 win against Balestier Khalsa in the 2024–25 Singapore Cup. Despite Maxime Lestienne's equaliser in the 91st minute of the 2025 AFC Champions League Two final against Sharjah, the Sailors finished as a runner-up after conceding in the 97th minute to finish the game in a 1–2 defeat. Bart helped the club overcome the disappointment of losing the ACL 2 final by scoring the winner in the final against BG Tampines Rovers and finishing as top scorer in the Singapore Cup with six goals.

After an outstanding 2025–26 campaign in which he contributed eight goals and 11 assists across 20 league appearances, Ramselaar was among the nominees for the coveted Player of the Year award.

With 54 goal contributions in 72 appearances over the course of his first 2 seasons with the Sailors, Ramselaar extended his contract for a further 2 years at the conclusion of the 2025–26 season.

== International career ==
Ramselaar received his first call up to represent the senior Netherlands team in May 2016 for friendly matches against Ireland, Poland and Austria but didn't make any single appearances. On 9 November 2016, Ramselaar make his debut in friendly match that contested in a 1–1 draw against Belgium.

On 13 November 2016, Ramselaar was named in the starting line-up to face Luxembourg during the 2018 FIFA World Cup qualification match.

== Career statistics ==
=== Club ===
As of 30 Oct 2026

Appearances and goals by club, season and competition
Club	Season	League			Cup		Uefa Champions League		Europa League		Total	
Club	Season	Division	Apps	Goals	Apps	Goals	Apps	Goals	Apps	Goals	Apps	Goals
Utrecht	2014–15	Eredivisie	5	1	0	0	0	0	0	0	5	1
Utrecht	2015–16	Eredivisie	37	5	5	3	0	0	0	0	42	8
Utrecht	2016–17	Eredivisie	2	1	0	0	0	0	0	0	2	1
Utrecht	Total		44	7	5	3	0	0	0	0	49	10
PSV Eindhoven	2016–17	Eredivisie	27	5	2	1	4	0	0	0	33	6
PSV Eindhoven	2017–18	Eredivisie	31	1	4	0	0	0	1	0	36	1
PSV Eindhoven	2018–19	Eredivisie	4	0	2	0	1	0	0	0	7	0
PSV Eindhoven	2019–20	Eredivisie	0	0	0	0	0	0	0	0	0	0
PSV Eindhoven	Total		62	6	8	1	5	0	1	0	76	7
Jong PSV	2018–19	Eerste Divisie	9	4	0	0	0	0	0	0	9	4
Utrecht	2019–20	Eredivisie	16	5	1	0	0	0	0	0	17	5
Utrecht	2020–21	Eredivisie	29	4	2	2	0	0	0	0	31	6
Utrecht	2021–22	Eredivisie	26	9	2	0	0	0	0	0	28	9
Utrecht	2022–23	Eredivisie	11	0	1	0	0	0	0	0	12	0
Utrecht	2023–24	Eredivisie	11	1	1	0	0	0	0	0	12	1
Utrecht	Total		93	19	7	2	0	0	0	0	100	21
Club	Season	League			Cup		AFC Competition		AFF Competition		Total	
Club	Season	Division	Apps	Goals	Apps	Goals	Apps	Goals	Apps	Goals	Apps	Goals
Lion City Sailors	2024–25	Singapore Premier League	20	10	6 (Note: 1 in Community Shield & 5 in Singapore Cup)	6	10	3	5	0	42	19
Lion City Sailors	2025–26	Singapore Premier League	20	8	3 (Note: 1 in Community Shield & 2 in Singapore Cup)	0	5	0	1	0	29	8
Lion City Sailors	2026–27	Singapore Premier League	4	1	1 (Note: 1 in Community Shield & 0 in Singapore Cup)	0	3	0	1	0	9	1
Lion City Sailors	Total		44	19	10	6	18	3	7	0	80	28
Career total			250	53	29	12	24	3	6	0	311	69

== Honours ==
PSV

- Eredivisie: 2017–18

Lion City Sailors

- AFC Champions League Two runner-up: 2024–25
- Singapore Premier League: 2024–25, 2025–26
- Singapore Cup: 2024–25, 2025–26
- Singapore Community Shield: 2024; runner-up: 2025

Individual

- Singapore Premier League Team of the Year: 2024–25, 2025–26
