= 2006–07 Hoofdklasse =

Hoofdklasse
- Season: 2006–07

The 2006–07 season of the Hoofdklasse was competed in six leagues, three Saturday leagues and three Sunday leagues. The champions of the three Saturday leagues faced each other after the regular season for the Dutch national Saturday amateur football title, the champions of the three Sunday leagues faced each other after the regular season for the national Sunday amateur football title. The Saturday and Sunday champions then faced each other for the national amateur football title.

== Final league standings ==
=== Saturday ===
==== Saturday Hoofdklasse A ====
| Pos | Team | Pld | W | D | L | GF | GA | GD | Pts | Qualification or relegation |
|---|---|---|---|---|---|---|---|---|---|---|
| 1 | Rijnsburgse Boys | 26 | 18 | 4 | 4 | 66 | 30 | +36 | 58 | League champion |
| 2 | Lisse | 26 | 16 | 5 | 5 | 51 | 28 | +23 | 53 | |
| 3 | Noordwijk | 26 | 14 | 4 | 8 | 42 | 34 | +8 | 46 | |
| 4 | ASWH | 26 | 13 | 3 | 10 | 53 | 44 | +9 | 42 | |
| 5 | Kozakken Boys | 26 | 12 | 4 | 10 | 44 | 43 | +1 | 40 | |
| 6 | DOTO | 26 | 11 | 6 | 9 | 52 | 48 | +4 | 39 | |
| 7 | Katwijk | 26 | 11 | 4 | 11 | 45 | 43 | +2 | 37 | |
| 8 | Ter Leede | 26 | 11 | 3 | 12 | 47 | 47 | 0 | 36 | |
| 9 | SHO | 26 | 9 | 4 | 13 | 46 | 52 | −6 | 31 | |
| 10 | TOGR | 26 | 8 | 5 | 13 | 34 | 48 | −14 | 29 | |
| 11 | Capelle | 26 | 7 | 7 | 12 | 38 | 45 | −7 | 28 | |
| 12 | Excelsior Maassluis | 26 | 8 | 3 | 15 | 34 | 47 | −13 | 27 | Qualified for relegation playoffs |
| 13 | Vitesse Delft | 26 | 8 | 2 | 16 | 47 | 70 | −23 | 26 | Relegated to the 2007–08 Eerste Klasse |
| 14 | Heerjansdam | 26 | 5 | 8 | 13 | 40 | 60 | −20 | 23 | Relegated to the 2007–08 Eerste Klasse |

==== Saturday Hoofdklasse B ====
| Pos | Team | Pld | W | D | L | GF | GA | GD | Pts | Qualification or relegation |
|---|---|---|---|---|---|---|---|---|---|---|
| 1 | IJsselmeervogels | 26 | 18 | 5 | 3 | 65 | 29 | +36 | 59 | League champion |
| 2 | Quick Boys | 26 | 15 | 6 | 5 | 60 | 33 | +27 | 51 | |
| 3 | Sparta Nijkerk | 26 | 15 | 4 | 7 | 60 | 38 | +22 | 49 | |
| 4 | Nunspeet | 26 | 12 | 8 | 6 | 49 | 37 | +12 | 44 | |
| 5 | Spakenburg | 26 | 12 | 6 | 8 | 47 | 35 | +12 | 42 | |
| 6 | GVVV | 26 | 11 | 7 | 8 | 48 | 35 | +13 | 40 | |
| 7 | Hoek | 26 | 10 | 9 | 7 | 57 | 48 | +9 | 39 | |
| 8 | Ajax (amateurs) | 26 | 7 | 10 | 9 | 34 | 41 | −7 | 31 | |
| 9 | Bennekom | 26 | 7 | 9 | 10 | 43 | 51 | −8 | 30 | |
| 10 | Kloetinge | 26 | 6 | 11 | 9 | 29 | 42 | −13 | 29 | |
| 11 | Geinoord | 26 | 7 | 8 | 11 | 31 | 49 | −18 | 29 | |
| 12 | Huizen | 26 | 4 | 11 | 11 | 26 | 41 | −15 | 23 (Note: SV Huizen and VVOG finished tied on points. VVOG won the playoff match 2-1, which meant that SV Huizen were relegated to the Eerste Klasse. VVOG will play relegation playoff matches.) | Relegated to the 2007–08 Eerste Klasse |
| 13 | VVOG | 26 | 6 | 5 | 15 | 27 | 50 | −23 | 23 | Qualified for relegation playoffs |
| 14 | SSV '65 | 26 | 0 | 5 | 21 | 21 | 68 | −47 | 5 | Relegated to the 2007–08 Eerste Klasse |

==== Saturday Hoofdklasse C ====
| Pos | Team | Pld | W | D | L | GF | GA | GD | Pts | Qualification or relegation |
|---|---|---|---|---|---|---|---|---|---|---|
| 1 | HHC Hardenberg | 26 | 17 | 4 | 5 | 65 | 37 | +28 | 55 | League champion |
| 2 | Be Quick '28 | 26 | 15 | 6 | 5 | 68 | 27 | +41 | 51 | |
| 3 | ACV | 26 | 13 | 5 | 8 | 49 | 31 | +18 | 44 | |
| 4 | ONS Sneek | 26 | 12 | 8 | 6 | 47 | 35 | +12 | 44 | |
| 5 | WHC | 26 | 11 | 8 | 7 | 34 | 26 | +8 | 41 | |
| 6 | Excelsior '31 | 26 | 11 | 5 | 10 | 39 | 35 | +4 | 38 | |
| 7 | Genemuiden | 26 | 11 | 5 | 10 | 47 | 47 | 0 | 38 | |
| 8 | Flevo Boys | 26 | 8 | 9 | 9 | 36 | 42 | −6 | 33 | |
| 9 | DOS Kampen | 26 | 7 | 9 | 10 | 28 | 53 | −25 | 30 | |
| 10 | Go Ahead Kampen | 26 | 8 | 4 | 14 | 30 | 50 | −20 | 28 | |
| 11 | Oranje Nassau | 26 | 7 | 6 | 13 | 27 | 50 | −23 | 27 | |
| 12 | Berkum | 26 | 5 | 10 | 11 | 38 | 49 | −11 | 25 | Qualified for relegation playoffs |
| 13 | Harkemase Boys | 26 | 6 | 6 | 14 | 29 | 46 | −17 | 24 | Relegated to the 2007–08 Eerste Klasse |
| 14 | Urk | 26 | 6 | 5 | 15 | 34 | 43 | −9 | 23 | Relegated to the 2007–08 Eerste Klasse |

=== Sunday ===
==== Sunday Hoofdklasse A ====
| Pos | Team | Pld | W | D | L | GF | GA | GD | Pts | Qualification or relegation |
|---|---|---|---|---|---|---|---|---|---|---|
| 1 | Argon | 26 | 16 | 4 | 6 | 55 | 28 | +27 | 52 | League champion |
| 2 | Elinkwijk | 26 | 13 | 8 | 5 | 39 | 23 | +16 | 47 | |
| 3 | ADO '20 | 26 | 15 | 3 | 8 | 46 | 40 | +6 | 45 (Note: ADO '20 were docked three points.) | |
| 4 | VVSB | 26 | 14 | 4 | 8 | 44 | 40 | +4 | 45 (Note: VVSB were docked one point.) | |
| 5 | AFC | 26 | 14 | 3 | 9 | 45 | 28 | +17 | 44 (Note: AFC were docked one point.) | |
| 6 | Türkiyemspor | 26 | 11 | 7 | 8 | 50 | 36 | +14 | 40 | |
| 7 | Haaglandia | 26 | 10 | 7 | 9 | 39 | 30 | +9 | 37 | |
| 8 | VUC | 26 | 10 | 6 | 10 | 37 | 40 | −3 | 36 | |
| 9 | Hollandia | 26 | 10 | 3 | 13 | 35 | 32 | +3 | 33 | |
| 10 | DWV | 26 | 8 | 6 | 12 | 30 | 43 | −13 | 30 | |
| 11 | Omniworld (amateurs) | 26 | 7 | 4 | 15 | 27 | 48 | −21 | 25 | |
| 12 | Hilversum | 26 | 7 | 6 | 13 | 29 | 41 | −12 | 24 (Note: FC Hilversum were docked three points.) | Qualified for relegation playoffs |
| 13 | Excelsior '20 | 26 | 5 | 7 | 14 | 27 | 48 | −21 | 22 | Relegated to the 2007–08 Eerste Klasse |
| 14 | TONEGIDO | 26 | 4 | 8 | 14 | 34 | 60 | −26 | 20 | Relegated to the 2007–08 Eerste Klasse |

==== Sunday Hoofdklasse B ====
| Pos | Team | Pld | W | D | L | GF | GA | GD | Pts | Qualification or relegation |
|---|---|---|---|---|---|---|---|---|---|---|
| 1 | JVC Cuijk | 26 | 16 | 3 | 7 | 60 | 26 | +34 | 51 | League champion |
| 2 | EVV | 26 | 14 | 5 | 7 | 42 | 31 | +11 | 47 | |
| 3 | Baronie | 26 | 12 | 8 | 6 | 43 | 30 | +13 | 44 | |
| 4 | Schijndel | 26 | 13 | 4 | 9 | 46 | 30 | +16 | 43 | |
| 5 | Gemert | 26 | 12 | 6 | 8 | 51 | 36 | +15 | 42 | |
| 6 | UDI '19 | 26 | 12 | 6 | 8 | 40 | 31 | +9 | 42 | |
| 7 | Papendrecht | 26 | 12 | 3 | 11 | 42 | 50 | −8 | 39 | |
| 8 | OJC Rosmalen | 26 | 11 | 4 | 11 | 50 | 38 | +12 | 37 | |
| 9 | Meerssen | 26 | 10 | 7 | 9 | 43 | 39 | +4 | 37 | |
| 10 | UNA | 26 | 8 | 12 | 6 | 45 | 35 | +10 | 36 | |
| 11 | Geldrop/AEK | 26 | 9 | 6 | 11 | 37 | 34 | +3 | 33 | |
| 12 | Blauw Geel '38 | 26 | 8 | 6 | 12 | 29 | 43 | −14 | 30 | Qualified for relegation playoffs |
| 13 | Groene Ster | 26 | 5 | 6 | 15 | 43 | 71 | −28 | 21 | Relegated to the 2007–08 Eerste Klasse |
| 14 | Triborgh | 26 | 1 | 2 | 23 | 17 | 94 | −77 | 5 | Relegated to the 2007–08 Eerste Klasse |

==== Sunday Hoofdklasse C ====
| Pos | Team | Pld | W | D | L | GF | GA | GD | Pts | Qualification or relegation |
|---|---|---|---|---|---|---|---|---|---|---|
| 1 | WKE | 26 | 18 | 5 | 3 | 67 | 32 | +35 | 59 | League champion |
| 2 | De Treffers | 26 | 17 | 5 | 4 | 71 | 29 | +42 | 56 | |
| 3 | WSV | 26 | 13 | 3 | 10 | 52 | 49 | +3 | 42 | |
| 4 | SC Enschede | 26 | 11 | 7 | 8 | 31 | 25 | +6 | 40 | |
| 5 | Achilles '29 | 26 | 11 | 6 | 9 | 44 | 36 | +8 | 39 | |
| 6 | HSC '21 | 26 | 10 | 8 | 8 | 50 | 39 | +11 | 38 | |
| 7 | Quick '20 | 26 | 9 | 9 | 8 | 43 | 44 | −1 | 36 | |
| 8 | Babberich | 26 | 11 | 3 | 12 | 38 | 49 | −11 | 36 | |
| 9 | Lienden | 26 | 10 | 5 | 11 | 36 | 44 | −8 | 35 | |
| 10 | Sneek Wit Zwart | 26 | 9 | 7 | 10 | 43 | 36 | +7 | 34 | |
| 11 | Be Quick 1887 | 26 | 9 | 6 | 11 | 33 | 39 | −6 | 33 | |
| 12 | Rohda Raalte | 26 | 8 | 6 | 12 | 41 | 46 | −5 | 30 | Qualified for relegation playoffs |
| 13 | Joure | 26 | 4 | 4 | 18 | 20 | 59 | −39 | 16 | Relegated to the 2007–08 Eerste Klasse |
| 14 | MSC | 26 | 3 | 4 | 19 | 28 | 70 | −42 | 13 | Relegated to the 2007–08 Eerste Klasse |

== National title ==
=== National Saturday title ===
| Pos | Team | Pld | W | D | L | GF | GA | GD | Pts | Qualification | IJSS | RIJN | HHC |
|---|---|---|---|---|---|---|---|---|---|---|---|---|---|
| 1 | IJsselmeervogels | 4 | 3 | 0 | 1 | 9 | 5 | +4 | 9 | Champion | | 4–1 | 2–1 |
| 2 | Rijnsburgse Boys | 4 | 2 | 0 | 2 | 7 | 9 | −2 | 6 | | 3–1 | | 0–3 |
| 3 | HHC Hardenberg | 4 | 1 | 0 | 3 | 5 | 7 | −2 | 3 | | 0–2 | 1–3 | |

=== National Sunday title ===
| Pos | Team | Pld | W | D | L | GF | GA | GD | Pts | Qualification | ARG | JVC | WKE |
|---|---|---|---|---|---|---|---|---|---|---|---|---|---|
| 1 | Argon | 4 | 3 | 0 | 1 | 11 | 5 | +6 | 9 | Champion | | 2–0 | 3–0 |
| 2 | JVC Cuijk | 4 | 2 | 1 | 1 | 10 | 6 | +4 | 7 | | 4–1 | | 3–0 |
| 3 | WKE | 4 | 0 | 1 | 3 | 4 | 14 | −10 | 1 | | 1–5 | 3–3 | |

=== National title ===
June 9, 2007
| Team 1 | Score | Team 2 |
|---|---|---|
| IJsselmeervogels | 1–1 | Argon |

June 16, 2007
| Team 1 | Score | Team 2 |
|---|---|---|
| Argon | 4–3 (a.e.t.) | IJsselmeervogels |

2006–07 Hoofdklasse winners

1st title
