= Kevin Görtz =

Dutch footballer (born 1989)

Personal information
- Date of birth: 28 November 1989 (age 36)
- Place of birth: Emmen, Netherlands
- Height: 1.82 m (6 ft 0 in)
- Position: Right-back

Youth career
- DZOH
- FC Emmen

Senior career*
Years	Team	Apps	(Gls)
2007–2014	FC Emmen	138	(2)
2014–2016	WKE	43	(2)
2016–2023	HHC Hardenberg	141	(1)
- * Club domestic league appearances and goals as of 06:23, 9 May 2024 (UTC)

Kevin Görtz (born 28 November 1989) is a Dutch footballer who plays as a right-back. He formerly played for FC Emmen, WKE, and HHC Hardenberg.

== Career ==
Görtz started his football career playing youth football at amateur club DZOH in his hometown Emmen before moving to the professional ranks with FC Emmen during his youth. Making his professional debut in the 2006–07 season under head coach Gerry Hamstra, he appeared in three matches that year. By the following season, he solidified his place as a regular starter, featuring in 21 matches. He scored his first goal on 7 November 2008, in a match against Haarlem, securing a 2–0 victory with a header from a free kick. Görtz remained with FC Emmen until the summer of 2011, marking his 100th appearance for the club against Helmond Sport on 30 March 2012. Extending his contract for two more years, he stayed with FC Emmen until 2014.

Subsequently, he continued his career at the amateur level with Derde Divisie club WKE before joining HHC Hardenberg in 2016, where he made 146 official appearances until leaving in 2023.
