= 2016 KNVB Cup final =

- Event: 2015–16 KNVB Cup
Feyenoord	FC Utrecht
2	1
- Date: 24 April 2016
- Venue: De Kuip, Rotterdam
- Referee: Björn Kuipers
- Attendance: 45,592

The 2016 KNVB Cup final was a football match between Feyenoord and FC Utrecht on 24 April 2016 at De Kuip, Rotterdam. It was the final match of the 2015–16 KNVB Cup competition and the 98th Dutch Cup Final. Feyenoord beat Utrecht 2–1 to win their first domestic cup since 2008 and their 12th in total.

== Route to the final ==
Feyenoord		Round	FC Utrecht	
Opponent	Result		Opponent	Result
PEC Zwolle	3–0 (H)	Second round	ONS Sneek	2–0 (A)
Ajax	1–0 (H)	Third Round	FC Groningen	5–3 (a.e.t.) (H)
Willem II	2–1 (a.e.t.) (H)	Fourth Round	Achilles '29	5–0 (A)
Roda JC	0–1 (a.e.t.) (A)	Quarter-finals	PSV	3–1 (A)
AZ	3–1 (H)	Semi-finals	VVSB	3–0 (H)

== Match ==
=== Details ===
24 April 2016
18:00 CEST

Feyenoord	2-1	FC Utrecht
Kramer 42'; Elia 75'	Report	Leeuwin 51'

De Kuip, Rotterdam
Attendance: 45,592
Referee: Björn Kuipers

Feyenoord	FC Utrecht

GK		(Netherlands) Kenneth Vermeer
RB		(Netherlands) Rick Karsdorp
CB	3	(Netherlands) Sven van Beek
CB		(Brazil) Eric Botteghin
LB	4	(Netherlands) Terence Kongolo
CM		(Morocco) Karim El Ahmadi
CM		(Netherlands) Tonny Vilhena
AM	7	(Netherlands) Dirk Kuyt (c)	(substituted off) 88'
RW	28	(Netherlands) Jens Toornstra
LW		(Netherlands) Eljero Elia
ST	31	(Netherlands) Michiel Kramer	(substituted off) 80'
Substitutes:
DF		(Netherlands) Miquel Nelom	(substituted on) 88'
FW		(Turkey) Bilal Başaçıkoğlu	(substituted on) 80'
Manager:
(Netherlands) Giovanni van Bronckhorst

GK	(Poland) Filip Bednarek
RB	(Netherlands) Mark van der Maarel (c)
CB	(Netherlands) Ramon Leeuwin
CB	(Netherlands) Timo Letschert
LB	(Netherlands) Christian Kum	(substituted off) 86'
CM	(Netherlands) Willem Janssen	(substituted off) 86'
CM	(Netherlands) Bart Ramselaar
RW	(Germany) Rico Strieder
LW	(Germany) Andreas Ludwig	(substituted off) 77'
ST	(Netherlands) Nacer Barazite
ST	(France) Sébastien Haller
Substitutes:
DF	(Netherlands) Ruben Ligeon	(substituted on) 86'
MF	(Netherlands) Patrick Joosten	(substituted on) 86'
FW	(Netherlands) Ruud Boymans	(substituted on) 77'
Manager:
(Netherlands) Erik ten Hag

Match rules

- 90 minutes.
- 30 minutes of extra-time if necessary.
- Penalty shoot-out if scores still level.
- Maximum of three substitutions.
