= Nick Tol =

Dutch footballer

Personal information
- Date of birth: 3 May 1989 (age 37)
- Place of birth: Volendam, Netherlands
- Height: 1.82 m (5 ft 11 1/2 in)
- Position: Midfielder

Team information
- Current team: RKAV Volendam

Youth career
- RKAV Volendam
- FC Volendam

Senior career*
Years	Team	Apps	(Gls)
2009–2013	FC Volendam	54	(0)
2013–2017	SV Spakenburg	105	(14)
2017–	RKAV Volendam		
- * Club domestic league appearances and goals

Nick Tol (born 3 May 1989 in Volendam) is a Dutch professional footballer who plays as a midfielder for RKAV Volendam. He formerly played for FC Volendam.
