= Mehmet Dingil =

Dutch footballer (born 1989)

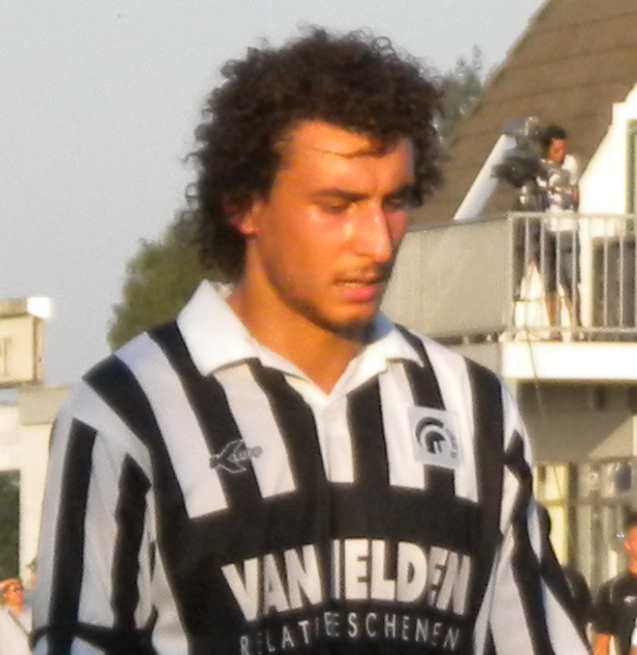

Personal information
- Full name: Mehmet Tayfun Dingil
- Date of birth: 28 November 1989 (age 36)
- Place of birth: Veghel, Netherlands
- Height: 1.80 m (5 ft 11 in)
- Position: Centre-back

Senior career*
Years	Team	Apps	(Gls)
2009–2012	Blauw Geel '38		
2012–2014	JVC Cuijk	48	(8)
2014–2016	Achilles '29	63	(5)
2016–2017	Menemen Belediyespor	17	(0)
2017–2019	Hatayspor	19	(2)
2019–2020	Afjet Afyonspor	26	(2)
2020–2021	Sancaktepe	12	(3)
2021–2022	Ankara Keçiörengücü	50	(1)
2022–2025	Iğdır	43	(0)
2024–2025	→ Çorum (loan)	9	(0)
- * Club domestic league appearances and goals as of 19:37, 30 January 2024 (UTC)

Mehmet Tayfun Dingil (born 28 November 1989) is a Dutch retired footballer who last played as a centre-back for TFF Second League club Iğdır.

== Club career ==
Dingil kicked off his career with amateur Blauw Geel '38 before signing for JVC Cuijk of Topklasse in 2012. In 2014, he entered fully pro football by signing for Achilles '29 of Eerste Divisie with whom he made his professional debut.

He moved to Menemen Belediyespor in summer 2016.

In June 2022, Dingil joined TFF Third League club Iğdır, after having played for several Turkish clubs the previous seasons, including Hatayspor, Afjet Afyonspor, Sancaktepe, and Ankara Keçiörengücü. He helped Iğdır reach promotion to the TFF Second League in his first season at the club.
