= Sjors Paridaans =

Dutch footballer

Personal information
- Full name: Sjors Paridaans
- Date of birth: 23 January 1986 (age 40)
- Place of birth: Eindhoven, Netherlands
- Height: 1.91 m (6 ft 3 in)
- Position: Centre back

Team information
- Current team: VV UNA (assistant)

Youth career
- RKVVO
- PSV

Senior career*
Years	Team	Apps	(Gls)
2006–2008	Fortuna Sittard	24	(0)
2008–2009	FC Eindhoven	50	(4)
2009–2011	FC Emmen	30	(2)
2011–2013	FC Eindhoven	71	(5)
2013–2016	Berchem Sport		
2016–2018	Turnhout		
2018–2020	VV UNA	23	(2)

Managerial career
- 2020–: VV UNA (assistant)
- * Club domestic league appearances and goals

Sjors Paridaans (born 23 January 1986 in Eindhoven) is a Dutch retired professional footballer who played as a defender and current assistant coach of VV UNA.

He formerly played for Fortuna Sittard, FC Eindhoven and FC Emmen.

== Career ==
=== Coaching career ===
After two seasons at VV UNA, Paridaans decided to retire at the end of the 2019–20 season, and was immediately appointed assistant coach of the club.
