= Anton Jongsma =

Curaçaoan footballer (born 1983)

Personal information
- Date of birth: 13 January 1983 (age 43)
- Place of birth: Utrecht, Netherlands
- Height: 1.70 m (5 ft 7 in)
- Position: Midfielder

Senior career*
Years	Team	Apps	(Gls)
2001–2003	Groningen	3	(0)
2003	→ Veendam (loan)	10	(0)
2003–2004	Achilles 1894		
2004–2006	Harkemase Boys		
2006–2008	Zwolle	75	(26)
2008–2010	RKC	16	(0)
2010	Emmen	6	(0)
2010–2016	WKE		
2016–2022	Pelikaan-s		
2022	VV Groningen		

International career
2008	Netherlands Antilles	4	(1)
2011	Curaçao	2	(0)
- * Club domestic league appearances and goals

Anton Jongsma (born 13 January 1983) is a Curaçaoan former professional footballer who played as a midfielder.

== Club career ==
Jongsma made his professional breakthrough for FC Zwolle in the 2006–07 season, and went on to score 26 goals in 86 total appearances for the club through two seasons.
