= Erik van der Ven =

Dutch footballer and manager

Personal information
- Date of birth: 15 February 1984 (age 42)
- Place of birth: Schaijk, Netherlands
- Height: 1.72 m (5 ft 7 1/2 in)
- Position: Midfielder

Senior career*
Years	Team	Apps	(Gls)
2004	KRC Genk	4	(1)
2004–2007	Helmond Sport	92	(7)
2007–2009	TOP Oss	60	(4)
2009–2011	FC Emmen	25	(1)
2011–2012	De Treffers	12	(0)
Total		193	(13)

Managerial career
- 2017–2018: Jong FC Den Bosch
- 2019–2021: FC Den Bosch
- 2022–: Feyenoord U17
- * Club domestic league appearances and goals

Erik van der Ven (born 15 February 1984) is a Dutch professional football manager and former player who is assistant manager of Feyenoord U21. As a player, he played as a midfielder for KRC Genk, Helmond Sport, TOP Oss, FC Emmen and De Treffers. He was appointed as manager of FC Den Bosch on a temporary basis in May 2019, having previously been assistant manager, before becoming the manager on a permanent basis in June 2019. He left the club in January 2021 by mutual consent. He was appointed as a youth team coach at the Feyenoord Academy in summer 2022, and became the under-21 assistant manager in summer 2025.
