= Jay-Roy Grot =

Surinamese footballer (born 1998)

Personal information
- Full name: Jay-Roy Jornell Grot
- Date of birth: 13 March 1998 (age 28)
- Place of birth: Arnhem, Netherlands
- Height: 1.93 m (6 ft 4 in)
- Positions: Striker; winger

Team information
- Current team: OB
- Number: 31

Youth career
- Vitesse 1892
- ESA Rijkerswoerd
- 2008–2015: NEC

Senior career*
Years	Team	Apps	(Gls)
2015–2017	NEC	31	(5)
2017–2020	Leeds United	20	(1)
2018–2019	→ VVV (loan)	33	(6)
2019–2020	→ Vitesse (loan)	22	(2)
2021	VfL Osnabrück	4	(0)
2021–2023	Viborg	43	(14)
2023–2025	Kashiwa Reysol	21	(1)
2025–	OB	36	(10)

International career^{‡}
2015	Netherlands U17	10	(2)
2016	Netherlands U18	1	(0)
2017	Netherlands U19	6	(1)
2017–2018	Netherlands U20	6	(0)
2018	Netherlands U21	1	(0)
2025–	Suriname	3	(0)
- * Club domestic league appearances and goals as of 19 May 2026 ‡ National team caps and goals as of 11 September 2026

Jay-Roy Jornell Grot (born 13 March 1998) is a professional footballer who plays as a striker or right winger for Danish Superliga club OB. Born in the Netherlands, he plays for the Suriname national team.

== Career ==
=== NEC ===
Grot played in Vitesse 1892's youth and then ESA Rijkerswoerd and at ten he was scouted by NEC and joined their academy. After 7 years in the academy Grot joined the NEC first team during the winter period of the 2014–15 season. In the summer of 2015, Grot signed a 3-year professional deal at the club.

He made his Eredivisie debut for NEC on 12 August 2015 in a 1–0 victory against Excelsior. On 26 November 2016, Grot scored his first goals for NEC, scoring a brace in the home 3–2 victory against FC Twente.

Despite scoring six goals for NEC in 24 appearances during the 2016–17 season, NEC suffered relegation from the Eredivisie, including scoring against FC Emmen in the first relegation playoff before losing to NAC Breda.

In June 2017, Grot flew in to Florence for talks with Serie A side Fiorentina, however the move fell through when the clubs couldn't agree on a fee.

On 22 August 2017, it was announced that Grot was flying to Leeds for a medical and to discuss personal terms with Leeds United, after a bid had been accepted.

=== Leeds United ===
On 24 August 2017, Grot signed a four-year deal with the EFL Championship side Leeds United for an undisclosed fee. He was assigned the number 11 shirt. On 26 August, Grot made his debut for Leeds in a 2–0 victory against Nottingham Forest. On 19 September, Grot made his first start for the club in a League Cup tie against Premier League side Burnley in Leeds' penalty shootout victory following a 2–2 draw. On 17 December 2017, Grot was jeered by Leeds fans after coming on as a substitute in a 1–0 win against Norwich City, with the then head coach Thomas Christiansen defending the player who had still not scored for the club.

He scored his first goal for the club in a defeat against Sheffield Wednesday on 17 March 2018. On 10 April 2018, Grot made his first league start in the EFL Championship game against Preston North End (with all his league appearances prior coming as a substitute).

After the end of the season, Grot was widely praised after he carried out an honest and open interview with Voetbal International in July 2018 talking about his 'difficult' first season in English football and living away from home.

==== VVV-Venlo (loan) ====
On 3 July 2018, Grot joined Eredivisie side VVV-Venlo on loan until 31 May 2019, in order to gain first team experience.

He made his debut for Venlo on 11 August 2018, in a 1–0 win against Willem II. His first goal for the club came on 22 September 2018 in a 3–0 win against NAC Breda. He followed this up with a goal against ADO Den Haag in a 2–0 win on 21 October 2018. His performances in the first half of the season at VVV-Venlo, helped earn him a call up to the Netherlands U21's.

In total, he made 33 appearances, playing in the majority of the 33 games as a left winger and scoring 6 goals and 3 assists for VVV-Venlo in Eredivisie, with Grot praised for his performances especially after scoring 3 goals in the final 5 games of the season.

==== Vitesse (loan) ====
On 28 June 2019, Grot joined to Vitesse on loan until 30 June 2020. He made his debut on 3 August 2019, in the 2–2 draw against Ajax, before Grot scored his first goal for the club in his 2nd game in a 0–2 win against Willem II on 10 August.

=== VfL Osnabrück ===
On 1 February 2021, the last day of the 2020–21 winter transfer window, Grot signed with 2. Bundesliga side VfL Osnabrück having agreed a contract until summer 2022.

=== Viborg ===
After leaving Osnabrück, Grot signed a two-year contract with newly promoted Danish Superliga club Viborg FF on 6 July 2021. He made his debut for the club on 22 August, coming off the bench in the 79th minute for Tobias Bech in a 2–0 league win over AGF. His first goal came on 2 September in a Danish Cup game against Fredericia, scoring the 1–1 equaliser shortly before full time. Despite his goal, Viborg were knocked out of the tournament after a penalty shootout. Grot made his first league start a few days later, playing 77 minutes of a 3–2 loss to AaB as a left winger. He would remain a starter throughout the autumn, as Viborg performed above expectations and had stayed out of the relegation zone. On 4 March 2022, Grot scored his first league goal for the club in a 3–1 loss to Midtjylland, heading in a cross from Younes Bakiz.

He made his European debut on 21 July 2022, starting in the UEFA Europa Conference League qualifier against Sūduva which ended in a 1–0 away win at Marijampolė Football Arena. Grot got off the mark on 14 August when he scored in a 2–0 league win over Silkeborg. His goalscoring picked up later in the fall, scoring six goals over seven matches in October and November 2022, bringing his tally to nine goals in seventeen total league appearances. Grot's performances led to him being named Superliga Player of the Month for October.

=== Kashiwa Reysol ===
On 2 February 2023, Grot was sold to Japanese J1 League club Kashiwa Reysol.

=== Odense BK ===
On 4 March 2025, Grot joined Danish Nordicbet Liga club Odense BK on a free transfer after having been released from his former club.

== International career ==
Grot is eligible for Netherlands and Suriname. He has represented both Netherlands U19 and Netherlands U17 at international level.

He was included in Netherlands U17 squad for the European Championships in 2015 and Netherlands U19 European Championship squad during the summer of 2017, with Grot scoring against Germany U19s in their group match on 3 July in a 4–1 victory, helping the Netherlands U19's reach the semi-finals of the tournament.

He made his debut for Netherlands U21 in November 2018, playing against Germany U21

== Style of play ==
Grot has been described as a striker, who is renowned for his pace, power and dribbling ability. Whilst a central striker, he can also play as a right winger.

== Personal life ==
His cousins Guilliano and Sherwin Grot are both professional footballers.

== Career statistics ==
As of match played 3 October 2025

Appearances and goals by club, season and competition
Club	Season	League			National cup (Note: Includes FA Cup, KNVB Cup, Danish Cup, Emperor's Cup)		League cup (Note: Includes EFL Cup, J.League Cup)		Continental		Other		Total	
Club	Season	Division	Apps	Goals	Apps	Goals	Apps	Goals	Apps	Goals	Apps	Goals	Apps	Goals
NEC	2015–16	Eredivisie	10	0	0	0	—		—		—		10	0
NEC	2016–17	Eredivisie	20	5	0	0	—		—		4 (Note: Appearances in Eredivisie relegation play-offs)	1	24	6
NEC	2017–18	Eerste Divisie	1	0	0	0	—		—		—		1	0
NEC	Total		31	5	0	0	—		—		4	1	35	6
Leeds United	2017–18	Championship	20	1	1	0	2	0	—		0	0	23	1
VVV-Venlo (loan)	2018–19	Eredivisie	33	6	1	0	—		—		—		34	6
Vitesse (loan)	2019–20	Eredivisie	22	2	3	0	—		—		—		25	2
VfL Osnabrück	2020–21	2. Bundesliga	4	0	0	0	—		—		—		4	0
Viborg	2021–22	Danish Superliga	25	5	1	1	—		—		1 (Note: Appearances in Danish Superliga European play-offs)	0	27	6
Viborg	2022–23	Danish Superliga	17	9	1	0	—		5 (Note: Appearances in UEFA Europa Conference League)	0	—		23	9
Viborg	Total		42	14	2	1	—		5	0	1	0	49	15
Kashiwa Reysol	2023	J1 League	17	1	1	0	4	2	—		—		22	3
Kashiwa Reysol	2024	J1 League	4	0	1	0	2	0	—		—		7	0
Kashiwa Reysol	Total		21	1	2	0	6	2	—		—		29	3
Odense	2024–25	Danish 1st Division	7	3	—		—		—		—		7	3
Odense	2025–26	Danish Superliga	11	2	0	0	—		—		—		11	2
Odense	Total		18	5	0	0	—		—		—		18	5
Career total			191	34	9	1	8	2	5	0	5	1	218	37

== Honours ==
OB

- Danish 1st Division: 2024–25

Individual

- Superliga Player of the Month: October 2022
