= Pedro Beda =

Brazilian footballer

Personal information
- Full name: Pedro Henrique Nogueira Beda
- Date of birth: 5 March 1989 (age 37)
- Place of birth: Aquidauana, Brazil
- Height: 1.84 m (6 ft 0 in)
- Position: Striker

Youth career
- Seduc
- 2002–2008: Flamengo

Senior career*
Years	Team	Apps	(Gls)
2008–2010	Heerenveen	1	(0)
2009–2010	→ Emmen (loan)	17	(1)
2010–2011	Corinthians	0	(0)
2011	→ Bahia (loan)	6	(0)
2012	Avenida	2	(0)
2012	Moreirense	0	(0)
2013	Ríver	6	(0)
2013	Olympique Khouribga	1	(0)
2014	Rudar Prijedor	5	(0)
2014–2015	Lucena	15	(4)
2015–2016	Lealtad	52	(12)
2016–2017	Boiro	35	(7)
2017–2018	Villanovense	13	(0)
2018–2019	Linares	33	(4)
2019–2022	Arosa	79	(26)
2022–2023	Boiro	35	(25)
- * Club domestic league appearances and goals

Pedro Henrique Nogueira Beda (born 5 March 1989) is a Brazilian retired footballer who played as a forward.

== Club career ==
Born in Aquidauana, Mato Grosso do Sul, Beda joined Flamengo's youth setup in 2002, aged 13, after starting it out at lowly locals SEDUC. He progressed through the ranks, being always top scorer, but failed to make a first team appearance for the club.

On 3 June 2008, Beda signed a two-year deal with Eredivisie club SC Heerenveen, for an undisclosed fee. He played his first match as a professional on 27 September 2008, coming on as a late substitute in a 2–4 away loss against NAC Breda.

In June 2009 Beda was loaned to FC Emmen, in a season-long deal. He appeared in 17 matches during the campaign, scoring three goals.

On 15 October 2010 Beda returned to Brazil, signing a short-term deal with Corinthians. He then moved to Bahia in January 2011 in a temporary deal, but was released on 1 June, after appearing sparingly.

On 2 March 2012 Beda joined Avenida, playing with the club in Campeonato Gaúcho. On 3 July he switched teams and countries again, signing a one-year deal with Moreirense F.C., freshly promoted to Primeira Liga.

Beda appeared in the whole pre-season with the Minho outfit, but left the club in August after alleging personal problems. On 3 January 2013 he joined Ríver in his homeland, but left the club two months later, again for personal reasons.

In February 2014 Pedro Beda signed a contract with Premier League of Bosnia and Herzegovina's FK Rudar Prijedor, after having a short stint at OC Khouribga in Morocco. He appeared in five matches for the club, and moved to Spanish Segunda División B side Lucena CF on 24 June.
