= Angelo Zimmerman =

Dutch footballer (born 1984)

Personal information
- Date of birth: 19 March 1984 (age 42)
- Place of birth: Willemstad, Curaçao, Netherlands Antilles
- Height: 1.85 m (6 ft 1 in)
- Position: Centre-back

Senior career*
Years	Team	Apps	(Gls)
2004–2006	Cambuur Leeuwarden	53	(5)
2006–2007	FC Emmen	37	(0)
2007–2009	BV Veendam	66	(8)
2009–2010	RBC Roosendaal	20	(1)
2010–2011	FC Emmen	45	(1)
2011–2016	WKE	124	(6)
2016–2017	ONS Sneek	40	(1)
Total		385	(22)

International career
2008	Netherlands Antilles	5	(1)
2011	Curaçao	2	(1)
- * Club domestic league appearances and goals

Angelo Zimmerman (born 19 March 1984) is a former professional footballer who played as a centre-back for Cambuur Leeuwarden, FC Emmen, BV Veendam, and RBC Roosendaal, among other clubs. At international level, he represented the Netherlands Antilles and Curaçao national teams
