= Sofian Akouili =

Dutch-Morocco professional footballer

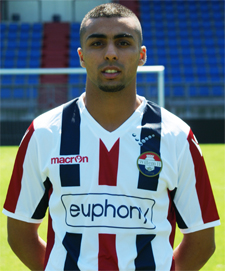

Personal information
- Full name: Sofian Akouili
- Date of birth: 28 February 1989 (age 37)
- Place of birth: Nador, Morocco
- Height: 1.85 m (6 ft 1 in)
- Position: Centre back

Youth career
- DWS
- 2004–2009: Heerenveen

Senior career*
Years	Team	Apps	(Gls)
2009–2010	Jong Heerenveen	0	(0)
2009–2010	→ Emmen (loan)	12	(0)
2011–2013	Willem II	32	(0)
2014	Atyrau	0	(0)
2014–2016	FC Volendam	41	(0)
2016–2017	OFC Oostzaan	4	(0)
2017–2018	CR Al Hoceima		
2018–2019	Mouloudia Oujda		
2019–2022	OFC Oostzaan		
2022–2024	Zeeburgia		
- * Club domestic league appearances and goals as of 17 July 2016

Sofian Akouili (born 28 February 1989 in Nador) is a Dutch-Morocco retired footballer who played as a centre back.

== Club career ==
He came through the Heerenveen youth system and formerly played for FC Emmen and Willem II and joined Volendam in summer 2014.
