= Timothy Cathalina =

Footballer (born 1985)

Personal information
- Date of birth: 24 January 1985 (age 41)
- Place of birth: Willemstad, Curaçao, Netherlands Antilles
- Position: Right-back

Youth career
- FC Twente

Senior career*
Years	Team	Apps	(Gls)
2005–2009	AGOVV	111	(5)
2009–2010	FC Emmen	18	(0)
2010–2011	Tranmere Rovers	7	(0)
2011–2013	Spakenburg		
- * Club domestic league appearances and goals

Timothy Cathalina (born 24 January 1985) is a retired footballer from Curaçao who played as a right-back.

== Career ==
Born in Willemstad, Curaçao, in the former Netherlands Antilles, Cathalina played youth football with FC Twente but began his professional career in 2005 with AGOVV Apeldoorn, making over 100 appearances, before moving to FC Emmen in 2009.

On 27 January 2010, Cathalina played on trial for Grimsby Town in a behind-closed-doors friendly against Hull City at Blundell Park. On 4 June 2010, he signed a one-year deal with Tranmere Rovers following a two-week trial towards the end of the 2009–10 season. In April 2011 his contract was cancelled by the club through mutual consent to allow him to look for an alternative club before the summer break.

In July 2011 Cathalina returned to Netherlands signing with SV Spakenburg. He later played for amateur sides Valleivogels, Apeldoornse Boys and Meerkerk.
