= Michel Poldervaart =

Dutch footballer

Personal information
- Date of birth: 28 March 1988 (age 38)
- Place of birth: Rotterdam, Netherlands
- Height: 1.74 m (5 ft 8 1/2 in)
- Position: Midfielder

Youth career
- Feyenoord

Senior career*
Years	Team	Apps	(Gls)
2008–2010	SC Heerenveen	0	(0)
2009–2010	→ FC Emmen (loan)	33	(0)
2010–2012	FC Emmen	23	(0)
Total		56	(0)
- * Club domestic league appearances and goals

Michel Poldervaart (born 28 March 1988) is a Dutch former professional footballer who played as a midfielder.

== Career ==
Poldervaart moved from Feyenoord to SC Heerenveen in September 2008. He spent the 2009–10 season on loan with FC Emmen, and signed a permanent two-year contract with the club in June 2010. He left Emmen at the end of the 2011–12 season, after his time with the club had been marred by injury. He made a total of 56 league appearances for Emmen, as well as two Cup appearances.

== Later life ==
In 2014, he opened a clothing store in Rotterdam with Royston Drenthe.
