= Miloš Malenović =

Serbian-born Swiss footballer (born 1985)

Personal information
- Date of birth: 14 January 1985 (age 41)
- Place of birth: Belgrade, SFR Yugoslavia
- Height: 1.83 m (6 ft 0 in)
- Position: Striker

Senior career*
Years	Team	Apps	(Gls)
2003–2004	Grasshoppers	1	(0)
2004–2006	Wohlen	51	(23)
2006–2007	St. Gallen	12	(0)
2007–2008	Neuchâtel Xamax	7	(1)
2008–2009	Omniworld	20	(1)
2009–2011	Emmen	22	(6)
2011	→ Veendam (loan)	12	(1)

International career^{‡}
	Switzerland U-21	4	(2)
- * Club domestic league appearances and goals as of 26 October 2009 ‡ National team caps and goals as of 26 October 2009

Miloš Malenović (born 14 January 1985) is a Serbian-born Swiss former football player who most recently played in the Netherlands for BV Veendam.

He was the sporting director of Swiss Super League side FC Zürich between October 2023 and December 2025.
