= Guillano Grot =

Surinamese footballer (born 1983)

Personal information
- Date of birth: 15 March 1983 (age 43)
- Place of birth: Paramaribo, Suriname
- Height: 1.86 m (6 ft 1 in)
- Position: Striker

Youth career
- De Treffers
- Vitesse 1892

Senior career*
Years	Team	Apps	(Gls)
2000–2001	NEC	1	(0)
2001–2005	De Treffers		
2003–2004	→ 1. FC Bocholt (loan)	15	(2)
2005–2007	NEC	31	(3)
2006–2007	→ Excelsior (loan)	21	(2)
2007–2008	Helmond Sport	4	(0)
2008	→ Inter Turku (loan)	10	(0)
2009–2010	Inter Turku	40	(9)
2011	De Treffers	4	(3)
2011–2015	WKE	80	(26)
2015–2016	Lienden	18	(5)
2016–2017	WNC	18	(5)
2017–2020	NEC amateurs		
Total		242	(55)
- * Club domestic league appearances and goals

Guillano Grot (born 15 March 1983) is a Suriname-born Dutch retired footballer who played as a striker.

== Career ==
Born in Paramaribo, Suriname, and raised in Arnhem, Netherlands, Grot came through the youth system at Vitesse 1892 before joining NEC in 2000. After one season in Nijmegen he moved to amateur side De Treffers in 2001, spending four seasons there; during the 2003–04 season he was loaned to German club 1. FC Bocholt.

Grot returned to NEC in 2005 and made first-team appearances through 2007, including a loan spell at Excelsior in 2006. He left NEC in July 2007 to sign for Helmond Sport. In August 2008 he joined FC Inter Turku on loan, winning the Veikkausliiga title that year, and in December 2008 he signed a two-year contract with the Finnish club. Released at the end of the 2010 season, he rejoined De Treffers, where he played alongside his brother Sherwin Grot. He played for several lower tier amateur clubs afterwards, including WKE, Lienden, and WNC.

== Personal life ==
Grot is the older brother of footballer Sherwin Grot and a cousin of Jay-Roy Grot.
