= Halil Çolak =

Turkish footballer (born 1988)

Personal information
- Full name: Ibrahim Halil Çolak
- Date of birth: 29 January 1988 (age 38)
- Place of birth: Birecik, Turkey
- Height: 1.76 m (5 ft 9 in)
- Position: Winger

Youth career
- IJsselstreek
- Go Ahead Eagles
- Twente

Senior career*
Years	Team	Apps	(Gls)
2008–2009	Twente	0	(0)
2008	→ Cambuur (loan)	11	(1)
2008–2009	→ Go Ahead Eagles (loan)	23	(6)
2009	Go Ahead Eagles	27	(10)
2010–2015	Kasımpaşa	60	(14)
2015–2016	Akhisarspor	7	(0)
2016	→ Şanlıurfaspor (loan)	6	(2)
2016–2019	İstanbulspor	72	(23)
2019	Balıkesirspor	12	(1)
2020	Samsunspor	11	(1)
2021–2023	Balıkesirspor	58	(10)
- * Club domestic league appearances and goals as of 19 April 2023

Ibrahim Halil Çolak (born 29 January 1988) is a Turkish professional footballer who plays as a winger

== Club career ==
=== Youth career ===
Çolak was born in Birecik, Turkey, but was raised in Deventer, a city in the Dutch province of Overijssel. Çolak started his career at local Deventer club IJsselstreek. He soon joined Go Ahead Eagles as a youth player. Go Ahead Eagles had a cooperation agreement with FC Twente, and he joined their youth academy. In 2007, he won the national youth championship with the FC Twente A-juniors.

=== FC Twente ===
In the summer of 2007, Çolak was promoted the Twente's reserve squad, where he captured a place in the starting lineup under coach Cees Lok. Due to some good performances, he was called up by first team coach, Fred Rutten for the match against FC Utrecht. However, he didn't manage to become a part of the squad and was a reserve. On the last days of the transfer market in January 2008, Çolak signed a loan deal with Cambuur Leeuwarden.

==== Loan deals (2008–09) ====
Çolak made his debut on 1 February 2008, two days after he was signed. His debut came in the home-match against FC Zwolle which ended in a 1–1 draw. He played the whole match. Çolak played 11 matches for Cambuur. He scored one goal.

On 27 July 2008, Go Ahead Eagles signed Çolak on a one-year deal, which meant a return to his hometown of Deventer. In the first league match of the season, an away-match against VVV-Venlo, he was a 57th-minute substitute for Jeffrey Vlug. The game eventually ended in a 5–0 loss for Go Ahead.

In the following match, a home game against Fortuna Sittard, Çolak was in the starting lineup and directly provided an assist. The ending result was 1–1.

Some weeks after at a training session, he broke his fibula which ruled him out for a couple of weeks. On 23 November he made his comeback with a place in the starting lineup in the match against FC Den Bosch, which ended in a goalless draw (0–0). In total he played 23 matches in which he scored six times.

=== Go Ahead Eagles ===
On 24 April 2009, it became clear that Çolak would stay another season on loan with Go Ahead Eagles. A month later, the loan deal was converted into a final transition, which meant that he was now definitively a Go Ahead player. He signed a three-year contract. In the first half of the 2009–10 season, Çolak scored 10 goals in 21 matches, making him an important player for the Eagles. He also scored in the KNVB Cup, including against Eredivisie side Heracles Almelo. His good performances were not going unnoticed. It was rumoured that Galatasaray were interested in the services of the young Turkish winger.

=== Kasımpaşa ===
On 12 August 2010 he moved to Turkey and signed a five-year deal with Süper Lig side Kasımpaşa. On 26 March 2015, Çolak was released by Kasımpaşa.

=== Later career ===
On 4 July 2015, Çolak was signed by Akhisarspor on a two-year contract. He would also play for İstanbulspor, Balıkesirspor and Samsunspor the following years. Being released from the latter in the summer of 2020, he rejoined Balıkesirspor in January 2021 after being a free agent for six months.
