= Sherwin Grot =

Dutch footballer (born 1990)

Personal information
- Date of birth: 29 July 1990 (age 36)
- Place of birth: Arnhem, Netherlands
- Height: 1.87 m (6 ft 2 in)
- Position: Forward

Team information
- Current team: FC Jeugd

Youth career
- Arnhemia
- 2002–2005: Vitesse
- 2005–2007: ESA
- 2007–2009: NEC

Senior career*
Years	Team	Apps	(Gls)
2009–2010	NEC	1	(0)
2010–2011	De Treffers	23	(2)
2011–2012	FC Presikhaaf		
2012–2013	PEC Zwolle	0	(0)
2013–2015	GVVV	55	(29)
2015–2016	Kozakken Boys	19	(10)
2016–2018	IJsselmeervogels	46	(19)
2018	→ TEC (loan)	15	(3)
2018–2019	GVVV	30	(9)
2019	SK Londerzeel	0	(0)
2019	DUNO	8	(6)
2020–2021	NEC Amateurs		
2021	MASV		
2022	Achilles '29		
2023-2024	DUNO		
2024–	FC Jeugd		
- * Club domestic league appearances and goals

Sherwin Grot (born 29 July 1990) is a Dutch footballer who plays for the FC Jeugd in the Vierde Klasse.

Formerly, he played on the professional level for Dutch club NEC of the Eredivisie league during the 2009–10 season and for PEC Zwolle during the 2012–13 season.

== Career ==
=== Londerzeel & VV Duno ===
On 17 August 2019 it was announced, that Grot had signed with Belgian club SD Londerzeel. However, one week later, Grot changed his mind and returned to the Netherlands to sign with VV DUNO.

Grot later revealed, that he left Londerzeel after one week because the parties had different views on the agreements made. He explained, that it suddenly turned out that he would not get a house there, and therefore would have to drive up and down for two hours every day.

On 28 November 2019 it was confirmed, that Grot had left VV DUNO again. He moved to the NEC Amateurs, SC NEC, in February 2020. He returned to DUNO in December 2023, a year after leaving Achilles '29.

On 11 June 2024, Grot joined Vierde Klasse club FC Jeugd.

== Personal life ==
Grot is the younger brother of footballer Guillano Grot and a cousin of Jay-Roy Grot.
