= WKE '16 =

Dutch football club

WKE
- Full name: Woonwagen Kamp Emmen
- Founded: 1966
- Ground: Grote Geert, Emmen
- Capacity: 4,000
- Chairman: Hinke Wolters
- Manager: Joseph Oosting
- League: Topklasse
- 2012–13: 4th, Sunday Topklasse
Home colours	Away colours

WKE (Woonwagenkamp Emmen (English: Emmen Trailer Park)) is a football club from Emmen, Netherlands. WKE was founded on 14 June 1966 by residents of the local trailer park. The club won promotion to the Hoofdklasse in 1981. Since 1981, WKE have been relegated to the Eerste Klasse in 1998 and 2004. WKE won the Sunday Hoofdklasse C title in the 2006–07 season and was nationwide amateur champion in 2008–09.

Many of their players played for FC Emmen in their youth or are retired former professional football players.

== Current squad ==
As of 1 February 2014

Note: Flags indicate national team as defined under FIFA eligibility rules; some limited exceptions apply. Players may hold more than one non-FIFA nationality.

No.	Pos.	Nation	Player
—	GK	NED	Diederik Bangma
—	GK	NED	Pieter IJzerman
—	GK	NED	Wim Kok
—	DF	NED	Almar Doek
—	DF	NED	Simon IJzerman
—	DF	NED	Jorrit Kunst
—	DF	NED	Antoine van der Linden
—	DF	NED	Sander Meertens
—	DF	NED	Franck Middelkamp
—	DF	NED	Bouke Scholten
—	DF	NED	Jan Velema
—	DF	NED	Guus de Vries
—	MF	NED	Robin Demeijer (captain)
—	MF	NED	Erik Eleveld

No.	Pos.	Nation	Player
—	MF	NED	Jan Hooiveld
—	MF	NED	Roy Hooiveld
—	MF	CUW	Anton Jongsma
—	MF	NED	Will Koops
—	MF	NED	Rudolf Lip
—	MF	NED	Robert Oosting
—	MF	NED	Kevin Wiegman
—	MF	CUW	Angelo Zimmerman
—	FW	NED	Ali Al Fredawi
—	FW	NED	Wouter Beijering
—	FW	NED	Guillano Grot
—	FW	NED	Koen Hateboer
—	FW	NED	Yume Ramos
—	FW	CUW	Eldridge Rojer
