= HHC Hardenberg =

Dutch football club

- Full name: Hardenberg Heemse; Combinatie
- Nickname: Het Tweede Oranje (the second orange)
- Founded: 1 June 1954; 72 years ago
- Ground: De Boshoek, Hardenberg
- Capacity: 4,500
- Chairman: Arend Jan Veurink
- Manager: René van der Weij
- League: Tweede Divisie
- 2025–26: Tweede Divisie, 6th of 18
Home colours	Away colours

Hardenberg Heemse Combinatie, commonly known as HHC Hardenberg, is a football club based in Hardenberg, Netherlands. The team compete in the Tweede Divisie, the third level of the Dutch football league system.

== History ==
HHC Hardenberg was founded in 1954, as the result of a merger between Hardenberg Voetbal Club of Hardenberg en SV Heemse of neighbouring Heemse. The letters HHC stand for Hardenberg Heemse Combinatie (Hardenberg Heemse Combination).

The club won its first title, in the Vierde Klasse (Fourth Class), in the 1964–65 season, securing promotion to the Derde Klasse (Third Class). The club played in that division for 11 seasons, and won the title in 1975–76, clinching promotion to the Tweede Klasse (Second Class).

The introduction of the Hoofdklasse changed the structure of the league. The Eerste Klasse (First Class) became the Hoofdklasse, and the Tweede Klasse, where HHC were playing, became the Eerste Klasse (First Class).

HHC was relegated back to what had become the Tweede Klasse after the 1990–91 season. HHC won the playoffs in that division in 1998, securing promotion to the Eerste Klasse (First Class).

In the 2000–01 season, HHC finished second in the Eerste Klasse E, qualifying for the playoffs. In the playoffs, HHC came close to being promoted to the Hoofdklasse. In the 2003–04 season, HHC finished tied on first place in the Eerste Klasse D. A decisive match against Excelsior '31 was lost, but HHC qualified for the playoffs and won both playoff matches, securing promotion to the Hoofdklasse, for the first time in the club's existence.

In the first season on the highest level of amateur football in the Netherlands, the club managed to avoid relegation, finishing the season in the Saturday Hoofdklasse C in 10th place (out of 14). In the 2005–06, HHC won the third periode (period), securing a place in the KNVB Cup 2006-07.

The third season of HHC in the Hoofdklasse ended with the title in the Saturday Hoofdklasse C. In the competition for the national Saturday title, HHC finished bottom of the group, behind Rijnsburgse Boys (champion of the Saturday Hoofdklasse A) and IJsselmeervogels (champion of the Saturday Hoofdklasse B). HHC managed to defend their title in the Saturday Hoofdklasse C the next season.

In the KNVB Cup 2006-07, HHC defeated RKSV Oisterwijk in the first round, but were eliminated by MVV in the second round. A year later, in 2007–08, the club defeated SV Babberich 2–1 in the first round. The second round match against VVSB finished 1–1 after regular time; the score after extra time was 5–4 for HHC. The club was eventually eliminated in the third round, by professional side AGOVV Apeldoorn.

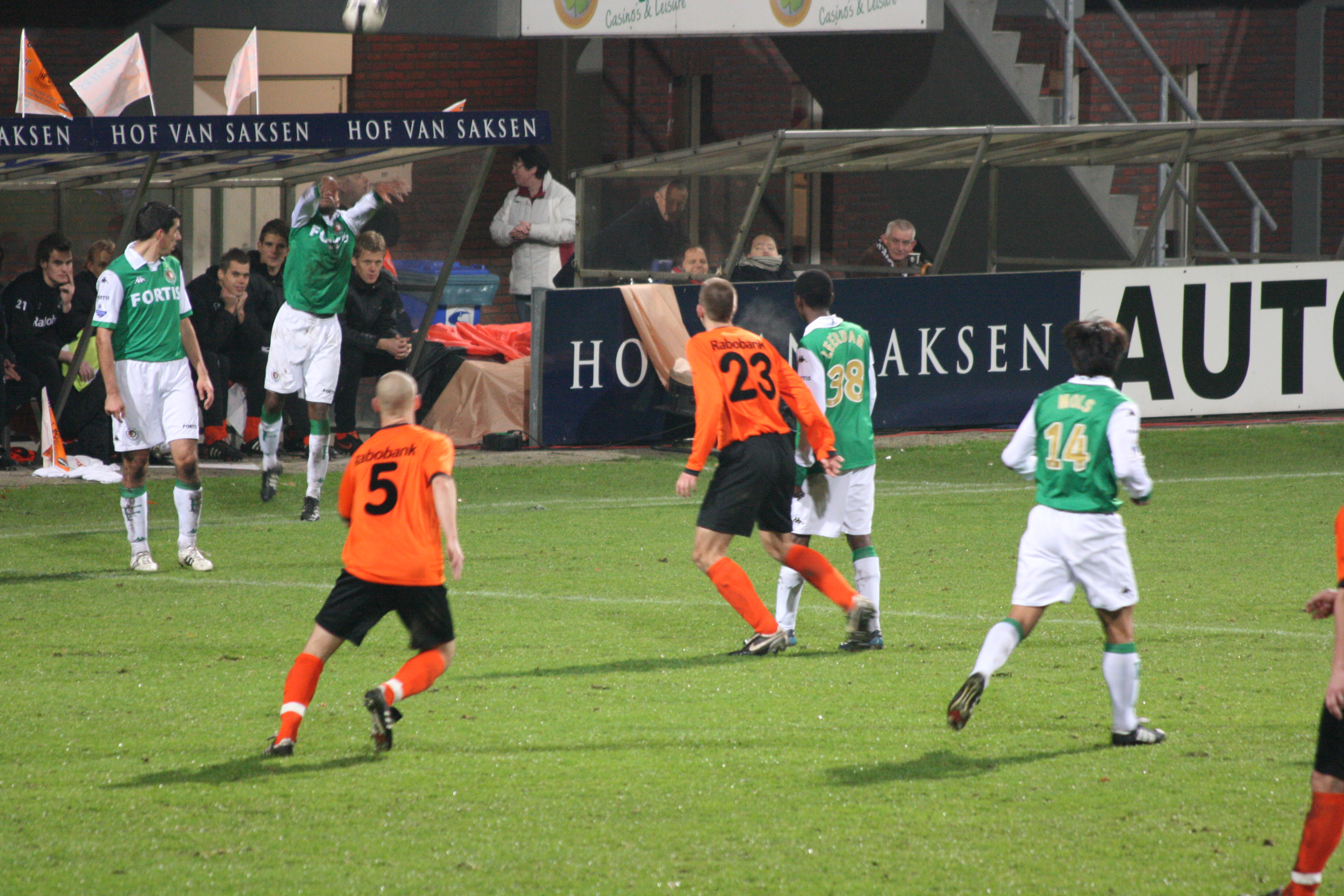
KNVB Cup 2008-09 match between HHC and Feyenoord on 13 November 2008

In the KNVB Cup 2008-09, HHC defeated Schijndel and Go Ahead Eagles in the first and second round. The third round was against professional club Feyenoord, and was supposed to be a home match for HHC. However, because of the significance of the match, it was decided that their home venue was insufficient. Therefore, the match was played in Emmen. The Univé Stadium in Emmen was sold out for the first time in more than ten years with 8500 visitors, most of them coming from Hardenberg. The half time score was 1–1, but Feyenoord would go on to win the match 1–5.

The club qualified to the newly established third tier, called Topklasse, at the end of the 2009–10 season through playoffs. In 2016, they entered the new formed Tweede Divisie, the highest amateur level of the Dutch football pyramid.

== Honours ==
The structure of the Hoofdklasse allows HHC Hardenberg up to three title opportunities in one season: the regular division, the Saturday title and the national title. The overall Saturday title is contested between the champions of the three Saturday leagues, and the national title is contested between the Saturday champion and the Sunday champion.

- Hoofdklasse division title: 2

2006–07, 2007–08

== Players ==
=== First-team squad ===
As of 21 October 2026

Note: Flags indicate national team as defined under FIFA eligibility rules; some limited exceptions apply. Players may hold more than one non-FIFA nationality.

No.	Pos.	Nation	Player
1	GK	NED	Jorick Maats
2	DF	NED	Tapmahoe Sopacua
3	DF	NED	Serginho Fatima
4	DF	NED	Matthew Steenvoorden
5	DF	NED	Jesse Vermaning
7	FW	NED	Melle Witteveen
8	DF	NED	Thom Olde Weghuis
9	FW	NED	Giovanni Zwikstra
14	MF	NED	Stefan Deuling
15	MF	NED	Adne Slot
16	FW	NED	Vince van den Anker

No.	Pos.	Nation	Player
17	DF	NED	Merijn Mink
18	DF	NED	Hank Bosch
19	MF	NED	Ben Scholte
20	DF	NED	Danny Bouws (captain)
21	MF	NED	Ivan Eggengoor
22	MF	NED	Noah ten Brinke
23	FW	NED	Thomas Reinders
24	DF	NED	Luka Prljić
25	GK	NED	Yme Meier
26	GK	NED	Thijs Terhalle
28	FW	NED	Maarten Pouwels
