= 2009–10 Eerste Divisie =

54th season of the second-tier football league in Netherlands

Eerste Divisie
- Season: 2009–10
- Champions: De Graafschap
- Promoted: De Graafschap; Excelsior
- Relegated: FC Oss
- Matches: 70
- Goals: 233 (3.33 per match)
- Biggest home win: Den Bosch 6-0 MVV
- Biggest away win: Eindhoven 0-8 Dordrecht
- Highest scoring: Zwolle 3-5 Dordrecht; Eindhoven 0-8 Dordrecht

The Eerste Divisie 2009–10 was the 54th season of the Eerste Divisie since its establishment in 1956. The previous year's winners were VVV-Venlo; they, with runner-up RKC Waalwijk, after a promotion/relegation playoff win over De Graafschap, were promoted to the Eredivisie. Twenty teams took part: eighteen from the 2008–2009 season and relegated teams FC Volendam and De Graafschap. The season's champion was promoted to the Eredivisie, while eight other teams, the second- through fifth-place finishers and period winners, faced the Eredivisie's sixteenth- and seventeenth-place finishers in promotion/relegation playoffs. For the first time since 1971, Eerste Divisie clubs also faced relegation; the last- and second-to-last-place teams were relegated to the new Topklasse, in which the best teams from Dutch amateur football play. The 2009–10 Eerste Divisie was sponsored by the Belgian beer brand Jupiler and so the official name of the league was Jupiler League.

The league started with twenty teams, but was reduced to nineteen in January 2010 following the disbandment of debt-ridden HFC Haarlem. All league games involving HFC Haarlem were cancelled and the number of teams that was relegated was consequently reduced to one.

== Teams overview ==
=== Venues ===
Location of teams in the Eerste Divisie 2009-2010

Club	Location	Venue	Capacity
AGOVV Apeldoorn	Apeldoorn	Stadion Berg & Bos	3,250
BV Veendam	Veendam	De Langeleegte	6,500
De Graafschap	Doetinchem	De Vijverberg	12,600
Excelsior	Rotterdam	Woudestein	3,531
FC Den Bosch	's-Hertogenbosch	De Vliert	9,000
FC Dordrecht	Dordrecht	GN Bouw Stadion	4,077
FC Eindhoven	Eindhoven	Jan Louwers Stadion	4,600
FC Emmen	Emmen	Univé Stadion	8,600
FC Omniworld	Almere	Mitsubishi Forklift Stadion	3,000 (2,500 seats)
FC Oss	Oss	TOP Oss Stadion	4,700
FC Volendam	Volendam	Kras Stadion	6,984
FC Zwolle	Zwolle	Oosterenk Stadion	10,000
Fortuna Sittard	Sittard	Wagner & Partners Stadion	12,500
Go Ahead Eagles	Deventer	Adelaarshorst	6,750
Helmond Sport	Helmond	Stadion De Braak	4,100
HFC Haarlem	Haarlem	Haarlem Stadion	3,442
MVV	Maastricht	De Geusselt	10,000
RBC	Roosendaal	RBC Stadion	4,995
SC Cambuur-Leeuwarden	Leeuwarden	Cambuur Stadion	10,250
Telstar	Velsen	Schoonenberg Stadion	3,250

=== Coaches and budget ===
Club	Coach	Budget (€)
AGOVV Apeldoorn	(Netherlands) John van den Brom	2,500,000
SC Cambuur-Leeuwarden	(Netherlands) Stanley Menzo	4,500,000
FC Den Bosch	(Belgium) Marc Brys	3,400,000
FC Dordrecht	(Netherlands) Gert Kruys	2,100,000
FC Eindhoven	(Netherlands) Jan Poortvliet	1,700,000
FC Emmen	(Netherlands) Harry Sinkgraven	3,100,000
Excelsior	(Netherlands) Alex Pastoor	2,400,000
Fortuna Sittard	(Netherlands) Roger Reijners	2,100,000
Go Ahead Eagles	(Netherlands) Andries Ulderink	3,200,000
De Graafschap	(Bosnia and Herzegovina) Darije Kalezić	5,800,000
HFC Haarlem	(Netherlands) Jan Zoutman	1,700,000
Helmond Sport	(Netherlands) Jurgen Streppel	2,700,000
MVV	(Turkey) Fuat Çapa	3,500,000
FC Omniworld	(Netherlands) Henk Wisman	2,100,000
FC Oss	(Netherlands) Hans de Koning	2,200,000
RBC Roosendaal	(Netherlands) Rini Coolen	3,200,000
Telstar	(Netherlands) Edward Metgod	1,700,000
BV Veendam	(Netherlands) Joop Gall	1,800,000
FC Volendam	(Netherlands) Edward Sturing	4,100,000
FC Zwolle	(Netherlands) Jan Everse	3,500,000

== Standings and results ==
=== Standings ===
Pos	Team	Pld	W	D	L	GF	GA	GD	Pts	Promotion or relegation
1	De Graafschap (C, P)	36	25	6	5	85	34	+51	81	Promotion to Eredivisie
2	Cambuur	36	21	8	7	78	48	+30	71	Qualification for promotion play-offs Second Round
3	Excelsior (P)	36	20	5	11	77	49	+28	65	Qualification for promotion play-offs Second Round
4	Zwolle	36	19	8	9	59	37	+22	65	Qualification for promotion play-offs Second Round
5	Go Ahead Eagles	36	18	9	9	53	33	+20	63	Qualification for promotion play-offs Second Round
6	AGOVV (Note: 2 points deducted)	36	16	9	11	63	52	+11	55	Qualification for promotion play-offs First Round
7	Den Bosch	36	14	12	10	66	54	+12	54	Qualification for promotion play-offs First Round
8	Helmond Sport	36	16	6	14	63	53	+10	54	Qualification for promotion play-offs First Round
9	Veendam (Note: 1 point deducted)	36	14	11	11	57	48	+9	52	
10	MVV	36	14	7	15	59	67	−8	48	
11	RBC Roosendaal	36	12	10	14	47	53	−6	46	
12	Eindhoven	36	13	7	16	63	81	−18	46	Qualification for promotion play-offs First Round (Note: As period champion. De Graafschap, Excelsior and Go Ahead Eagles are also period champions.)
13	Dordrecht	36	13	4	19	54	59	−5	43	
14	Omniworld	36	11	7	18	40	65	−25	40	
15	Emmen	36	10	8	18	51	79	−28	38	
16	Volendam	36	8	11	17	61	81	−20	35	
17	Fortuna Sittard	36	7	9	20	31	57	−26	30	
18	Telstar	36	7	8	21	45	65	−20	29	
19	Oss (R)	36	6	11	19	42	79	−37	29	Relegation to the Topklasse
20	Haarlem (D, R)	23	3	4	16	26	61	−35	13	Excluded from professional football after bankruptcy

Source: Eerste divisie (official site) (in Dutch)
Rules for classification: 1) points; 2) goal difference; 3) number of goals scored.
(C) Champions; (D) Disqualified; (P) Promoted; (R) Relegated

=== Results table ===
Home \ Away	AGO	CAM	DBO	DOR	EIN	EMM	EXC	FOR	GAE	GRA	HAA	HEL	MVV	OMN	OSS	RBC	TEL	VEE	VOL	ZWO
AGOVV Apeldoorn		3–4	2–0	0–2	4–1	3–1	4–2	1–0	1–1	2–2		0–0	5–1	0–2	2–1	0–1	2–0	2–3	2–2	2–0
SC Cambuur	1–1		1–0	3–0	3–1	1–0	1–2	2–1	0–0	1–1	4–1	2–0	1–1	4–2	8–1	1–1	1–1	1–0	3–0	3–0
FC Den Bosch	1–0	2–4		2–1	1–1	4–4	2–3	3–1	1–1	0–3		2–1	6–0	4–0	3–3	0–2	2–0	2–2	3–0	1–1
FC Dordrecht	1–2	2–3	1–3		0–3	5–0	0–1	2–1	2–0	1–2		0–1	1–4	1–0	0–1	2–0	0–3	0–1	3–2	0–3
FC Eindhoven	3–1	3–1	1–1	0–8		1–2	4–4	2–2	1–2	2–6		3–2	4–3	2–0	4–0	1–3	1–2	3–2	2–3	0–1
FC Emmen	3–1	2–4	0–0	1–1	4–1		4–2	0–0	0–1	1–2		1–3	2–1	1–3	3–3	0–4	3–2	2–2	2–4	0–3
Excelsior	0–1	3–0	5–1	4–0	4–1	4–1		1–0	1–1	2–1	3–0	1–2	3–0	2–0	4–4	2–1	2–2	2–0	4–1	3–0
Fortuna Sittard	2–2	1–2	1–0	0–3	2–3	0–2	2–1		2–0	0–2	5–1	0–4	2–0	2–2	2–0	0–0	2–0	0–1	3–2	0–2
Go Ahead Eagles	0–0	1–2	4–1	1–2	2–3	0–2	1–0	2–0		1–0	3–2	3–2	4–0	2–0	3–1	3–1	2–1	3–0	0–0	1–0
De Graafschap	3–5	3–0	1–1	2–0	3–0	2–3	3–1	2–0	3–2		4–1	4–0	2–1	4–0	4–0	0–0	2–1	3–0	4–1	1–4
HFC Haarlem	1–2	0–4	3–2	0–3	2–1	4–0	0–1					1–4			1–1			1–6	1–2	1–2
Helmond Sport	4–4	2–4	2–1	1–1	2–2	2–0	3–1	0–0	0–2	0–2			2–4	2–1	3–1	3–0	0–1	4–1	5–2	2–0
MVV	3–2	2–1	2–2	1–0	2–2	2–1	1–1	2–1	0–0	1–3	0–0	3–1		1–0	5–0	2–1	2–0	3–1	5–2	0–2
FC Omniworld	1–2	1–5	3–4	1–1	3–1	3–1	2–5	0–0	2–0	0–5	4–2	1–0	1–1		0–1	0–2	2–1	1–1	2–1	0–0
FC Oss	1–0	4–5	1–3	0–1	1–1	1–3	1–2	1–1	0–0	1–3	1–0	0–2	3–2	2–2		0–1	1–1	0–3	1–1	2–1
RBC Roosendaal	0–2	1–0	0–3	4–1	4–0	1–1	0–2	2–1	1–3	0–1	2–2	2–1	3–0	1–2	0–3		0–3	2–2	2–2	0–0
Telstar	1–2	1–2	1–4	1–3	1–2	4–1	1–2	3–1	0–1	0–2	2–2	1–4	2–1	1–2	1–1	2–2		1–1	1–1	2–3
BV Veendam	3–0	2–2	0–1	2–1	0–1	3–0	2–1	5–1	1–1	1–1		0–0	1–0	0–1	4–1	1–1	1–1		4–0	2–1
FC Volendam	0–1	2–2	1–1	3–3	0–2	6–0	1–0	0–0	2–6	0–1	5–0	1–2	2–2	3–0	1–0	3–3	6–2	4–3		0–3
FC Zwolle	2–2	1–0	1–1	3–5	2–1	0–0	1–0	3–0	1–0	2–2		3–1	2–1	2–0	0–0	6–1	1–0	1–2	4–2	

Source: Eerste divisie (official site) (in Dutch)
Legend: Blue = home team win; Yellow = draw; Red = away team win.

=== Standings 1st Period ===
Pos	Team	Pld	W	D	L	GF	GA	GD	Pts
1	Go Ahead Eagles	9	7	1	1	16	4	+12	22
2	SC Cambuur	9	5	4	0	22	13	+9	19
3	De Graafschap	9	5	3	1	20	7	+13	18
4	Helmond Sport	9	5	3	1	23	11	+12	18
5	FC Dordrecht	9	5	2	2	24	12	+12	17
6	AGOVV Apeldoorn	9	5	2	2	16	12	+4	17
7	BV Veendam	9	4	2	3	20	13	+7	14
8	Telstar	9	3	4	2	16	13	+3	13
9	Excelsior	9	3	4	2	16	14	+2	13
10	RBC Roosendaal	9	3	3	3	12	11	+1	12
10	FC Zwolle	9	3	3	3	12	11	+1	12
12	FC Den Bosch	9	2	4	3	21	18	+3	10
13	FC Volendam	9	2	4	3	12	18	−6	10
14	FC Oss	9	2	3	4	12	18	−6	9
15	MVV	9	2	3	4	12	20	−8	9
16	HFC Haarlem	9	2	2	5	14	25	−11	8
17	FC Omniworld	9	2	1	6	9	17	−8	7
18	FC Eindhoven	9	1	4	4	15	27	−12	7
19	Fortuna Sittard	9	1	2	6	9	20	−11	5
20	FC Emmen	9	0	2	7	4	21	−17	2

Source: Eerste divisie (official site) (in Dutch)

=== Standings 2nd Period ===
Pos	Team	Pld	W	D	L	GF	GA	GD	Pts
1	Excelsior	9	7	0	2	15	9	+6	21
2	De Graafschap	9	6	2	1	16	7	+9	20
3	SC Cambuur	9	6	1	2	22	16	+6	19
4	FC Den Bosch	9	5	3	1	17	8	+9	18
5	MVV	9	6	0	3	20	14	+6	18
6	Go Ahead Eagles	9	5	2	2	18	10	+8	17
7	FC Zwolle	9	5	2	2	13	11	+2	17
8	BV Veendam	9	3	4	2	13	10	+3	13
9	Helmond Sport	9	4	1	4	16	18	−2	13
10	FC Emmen	9	4	1	4	15	19	−4	13
11	FC Dordrecht	9	4	0	5	15	12	+3	12
12	AGOVV Apeldoorn	9	3	3	3	19	17	+2	12
13	FC Volendam	9	3	2	4	20	21	−1	11
14	Fortuna Sittard	9	2	3	4	9	14	−5	9
15	RBC Roosendaal	9	2	3	4	8	13	−5	9
16	FC Omniworld	9	2	2	5	10	15	−5	8
17	Telstar	9	2	1	6	12	17	−5	7
18	FC Eindhoven	9	2	1	6	13	21	−8	7
19	FC Oss	9	2	0	7	11	19	−8	6
20	HFC Haarlem	9	1	1	7	10	21	−11	4

Source: Eerste divisie (official site) (in Dutch)

=== Standings 3rd Period ===
Pos	Team	Pld	W	D	L	GF	GA	GD	Pts
1	FC Eindhoven	8	7	0	1	21	9	+12	21
2	De Graafschap	8	6	1	1	16	6	+10	19
3	FC Zwolle	8	6	0	2	17	6	+11	18
4	Excelsior	8	5	0	3	18	6	+12	15
5	Go Ahead Eagles	8	3	4	1	11	7	+4	13
6	BV Veendam	8	4	1	3	15	12	+3	13
7	RBC Roosendaal	8	4	1	3	12	12	0	13
8	FC Omniworld	8	4	1	3	11	16	−5	13
9	SC Cambuur	8	3	3	2	11	10	+1	12
10	AGOVV Apeldoorn	8	3	3	2	9	9	0	12
11	Fortuna Sittard	8	3	1	4	9	9	0	10
12	Helmond Sport	8	3	1	4	12	13	−1	10
13	FC Volendam	8	2	3	3	12	11	+1	9
14	FC Den Bosch	8	2	2	4	11	13	−2	8
15	MVV	8	2	1	5	10	15	−5	7
16	FC Dordrecht	8	2	1	5	8	17	−9	7
17	FC Emmen	8	1	2	5	12	22	−10	5
18	FC Oss	8	0	4	4	7	17	−10	4
19	Telstar	8	1	1	6	7	18	−11	4
20	HFC Haarlem	5	0	1	4	2	15	−13	1

Source: Eerste divisie (official site) (in Dutch)

=== Standings 4th Period ===
Pos	Team	Pld	W	D	L	GF	GA	GD	Pts
1	De Graafschap (Note: Since De Graafschap has won the Eerste Divisie Title, there will not be any team from the 4th Period participating in the Promotion/relegation play-offs for Eredivisie.)	8	8	0	0	26	5	+21	24
2	SC Cambuur	8	6	0	2	24	9	+15	18
3	FC Emmen	8	4	3	1	18	14	+4	15
4	FC Den Bosch	8	4	3	1	15	11	+4	15
5	FC Omniworld	8	4	2	2	11	10	+1	14
6	AGOVV Apeldoorn	8	4	1	3	15	10	+5	13
7	FC Zwolle	8	3	3	2	11	9	+2	12
8	BV Veendam	8	3	3	2	13	12	+1	12
9	Helmond Sport	8	3	1	4	13	10	+3	10
10	Excelsior	8	3	1	4	15	16	−1	10
11	Go Ahead Eagles	8	3	1	4	7	10	−3	10
12	Fortuna Sittard	8	2	3	3	8	9	−1	9
13	MVV	8	2	3	3	9	15	−6	9
14	FC Oss	8	2	3	3	10	19	−9	9
15	FC Eindhoven	8	2	2	4	10	15	−5	8
16	RBC Roosendaal	8	1	4	3	13	15	−2	7
17	FC Volendam	8	1	2	5	12	25	−13	5
18	Telstar	8	1	1	6	9	15	−6	4
19	FC Dordrecht	8	1	1	6	4	13	−9	4

Source: Eerste divisie (official site) (in Dutch)

== Playoffs ==
Please note that the following teams: Sparta Rotterdam & Willem II joined the Eerste Divisie-teams for the playoffs, after finishing 16th and 17th in the Eredivisie.

=== Round 1 ===
Team 1	Agg.	Team 2	1st leg	2nd leg
FC Eindhoven	4–2	AGOVV Apeldoorn	1–0	3–2
Helmond Sport	3–3 (p. 5–4)	FC Den Bosch	1–2	2–1

=== Round 2 ===
Team 1	Agg.	Team 2	1st leg	2nd leg
FC Eindhoven	2–3	Willem II	1–2	1–1
Go Ahead Eagles	2–1	SC Cambuur	2–0	0–1
FC Zwolle	3–5	Excelsior	0–1	3–4
Helmond Sport	2–3	Sparta Rotterdam	2–1	0–2

=== Round 3 ===
Team 1	Agg.	Team 2	1st leg	2nd leg
Go Ahead Eagles	1–3	Willem II	1–0	0–1 (0-3 a.e.t.)
Excelsior	1–1	Sparta Rotterdam	0–0	1–1

Willem II and Excelsior will play in Eredivisie 2010–11.

== Statistics ==
Last updated: 9 April 2010; Source: Eerste divisie (official site) (in Dutch)

=== Top scorers ===
Pos.	Player	Club	Goals
1	(Netherlands) Michael de Leeuw	Veendam	23
2	(Netherlands) Mark de Vries	Cambuur	21
2	(Netherlands) Johan Voskamp	Helmond Sport	21
4	(Netherlands) Glynor Plet	Telstar	20
5	(Belgium) Fabio Caracciolo	Den Bosch	19
6	(Argentina) Hugo Bargas	Graafschap	16
7	(Belgium) Nacer Chadli	AGOVV	15
7	(Netherlands) Nassir Maachi	Cambuur	15
7	(Angola) Diangi Matusiwa	Den Bosch	15
7	(Netherlands) Ruud ter Heide	Emmen	15
7	(Netherlands) Sjoerd Ars	RBC	15
7	(Netherlands) Jack Tuyp	Volendam	15
13	(France) Daniel Gomez	MVV	14
14	(Armenia) Edgar Manucharyan	AGOVV	12
14	(Netherlands) Sandor van der Heide	Cambuur	12
14	(Netherlands) Moussa Kalisse	Dordrecht	12
14	(Netherlands Antilles) Leon Kantelberg	Eindhoven	12
14	(Netherlands) Tim Nelemans	Eindhoven	12
14	(Netherlands) Hans Denissen	Emmen	12
14	(Netherlands) Berry Powel	De Graafschap	12
14	(Netherlands) Yuri Rose	Graafschap	12
14	(Netherlands) Melvin Platje	Volendam	12
23	(Morocco) Karim Fachtali	Omniworld	11
24	9 players		10
33	5 players		9
38	4 players		8
42	11 players		7
53	8 players		6
61	17 players		5
78	22 players		4
100	35 players		3
135	46 players		2
181	89 players		1
Own goals			23
Total:			1113
Games:			340
Average:			3.27

=== Other scorers ===
10 goals

- (Netherlands) Jeremy Bokila (AGOVV)
- (Netherlands) Paco van Moorsel (Den Bosch)
- (Netherlands) Género Zeefuik (Dordrecht)
- (Democratic Republic of the Congo) Patrick N'Koyi (Eindhoven)
- (South Africa) Kermit Erasmus (Excelsior)
- (Netherlands) Guyon Fernandez (Excelsior)
- (Netherlands) Luis Pedro (Excelsior)
- (Netherlands) Halil Çolak (Go Ahead Eagles)
- (Netherlands) Eldridge Rojer (Zwolle)

9 goals

- (Netherlands) Jeffrey de Visscher (Cambuur)
- (Sweden) Dembe Traore (Fortuna Sittard)
- (Belgium) Steve De Ridder (Graafschap)
- (Netherlands) Marc Höcher (Helmond Sport)
- (Netherlands) Mark Veldmate (Helmond Sport)

8 goals

- (Netherlands) Reza Ghoochannejhad (Cambuur)
- (Netherlands) Ibad Muhamadu (Dordrecht)
- (Netherlands) Roy Stroeve (Emmen)
- (Netherlands) Jordy Buijs (De Graafschap)

7 goals

- (Netherlands) Jeffrey Vlug (Eindhoven)
- (Poland) Michal Janota (Excelsior)
- (Netherlands) Koen van der Biezen (Go Ahead Eagles)
- (Belgium) Robbie Haemhouts (Omniworld)
- (Netherlands) Tim Peters (Oss)
- (Netherlands) Marnix Kolder (Veendam)
- (Netherlands) Paul de Lange (Volendam)
- (Netherlands) Rowin van Zaanen (Volendam)
- (Netherlands) Erik Bakker (Zwolle)
- (Netherlands) Danny Schreurs (Zwolle)
- (Netherlands) Arne Slot (Zwolle)

6 goals

- (Switzerland) Milos Malenovic (Emmen)
- (Netherlands) Ryan Koolwijk (Excelsior)
- (Netherlands) Roel de Graaff (Haarlem)
- (Netherlands) Jules Reimerink (Go Ahead Eagles)
- (Netherlands) Malcolm Esajas (MVV)
- (Netherlands) Bryan Linssen (MVV)
- (Netherlands) Michiel Hemmen (Veendam)
- (Cape Verde) Cecilio Lopes (Zwolle)

5 goals

- (Netherlands) Danny Guijt (Cambuur)
- (Netherlands) Oguzhan Türk (Cambuur)
- (Netherlands) Paul Jans (Den Bosch)
- (Netherlands) Niels Vorthoren (Den Bosch)
- (Netherlands) John Verhoek (Dordrecht)
- (Netherlands) Oussama Assaidi (De Graafschap)
- (Brazil) Bruno Andrade (Helmond Sport)
- (United States) Charles Kazlauskas (Helmond Sport)
- (Belgium) Gideon Boateng (MVV)
- (Netherlands) Sander Duits (Omniworld)
- (Netherlands) Johan Plat (Oss)
- (Democratic Republic of the Congo) Joel Tshibamba (Oss)
- (Netherlands) Gregory Nelson (RBC)
- (Netherlands) Sjaak Polak (RBC)
- (Netherlands) Tjeerd Korf (Veendam)
- (Netherlands) Michiel Kramer (Volendam)
- (Netherlands) Albert van der Haar (Zwolle)

4 goals

- (Philippines) Paul Mulders (AGOVV)
- (France) Kévin Diaz (Cambuur)
- (Netherlands) Wilmer Kousemaker (Den Bosch)
- (Netherlands) Johan Versluis (Dordrecht)
- (Netherlands) Adnan Alisic (Excelsior)
- (Netherlands) Norichio Nieveld (Excelsior)
- (Netherlands) Mitchell Schet (Excelsior)
- (Serbia) Žarko Grabovac (Fortuna Sittard)
- (Germany) Marcus Rychlik (Fortuna Sittard)
- (Estonia) Sander Post (Go Ahead Eagles)
- (Netherlands) Joey Suk (Go Ahead Eagles)
- (Netherlands) Soufian El Hassnaoui (De Graafschap)
- (Netherlands) Laurens ten Heuvel (Haarlem)
- (Netherlands) Jeffrey Altheer (Helmond Sport)
- (Belgium) Christian Brüls (MVV)
- (Netherlands) Reginald Faria (Omniworld)
- (Belgium) Emrullah Güvenç (Oss)
- (Belgium) Jordan Remacle (RBC)
- (Netherlands) Erwin Koen (Telstar)
- (Netherlands) Frank Korpershoek (Telstar)
- (Netherlands) Anco Jansen (Veendam)
- (Netherlands) René Wessels (Veendam)

3 goals

- (Netherlands) Jaimé Bruinier (AGOVV)
- (Belgium) Hans van de Haar (AGOVV)
- (Netherlands) Julius Wille (AGOVV)
- (Netherlands) Léon Hese (Cambuur)
- (Netherlands) Adnan Barakat (Den Bosch)
- (Netherlands) Samuel Scheimann (Den Bosch)
- (Netherlands) Sven Delanoy (Dordrecht)
- (Netherlands) Juanito Sequeira (Dordrecht)
- (Netherlands) Rob van Boekel (Eindhoven)
- (Netherlands) Ruud van der Rijt (Eindhoven)
- (Netherlands) Xander Houtkoop (Emmen)
- (Netherlands) Kevin Wattamaleo (Excelsior)
- (Netherlands) Rick Geenen (Fortuna Sittard)
- (Netherlands) Harrie Gommans (Fortuna Sittard)
- (Belgium) Anthony Di Lallo (Fortuna Sittard)
- (Netherlands) Ramon Voorn (Fortuna Sittard)
- (Netherlands) Patrick Gerritsen (Go Ahead Eagles)
- (Finland) Marco Parnela (Go Ahead Eagles)
- (Netherlands) Erwin Buurmeijer (Emmen)
- (Netherlands) Guus Joppen (Helmond Sport)
- (Turkey) Serdar Öztürk (Omniworld)
- (Netherlands) Genaro Snijders (Omniworld)
- (Netherlands) Renee Troost (Omniworld)
- (Netherlands) Davy Zafarin (Oss)
- (Netherlands) Umut Gündoğan (RBC)
- (Netherlands) Melvin de Leeuw (RBC)
- (Netherlands) Cees Toet (RBC)
- (Netherlands) Raymond Fafiani (Telstar)
- (Netherlands) Furdjel Narsingh (Telstar)
- (Netherlands) Benito Olenski (Telstar)
- (Netherlands) Bernard Hofstede (Volendam)
- (Netherlands) Thijs Sluijter (Volendam)
- (Netherlands) Ruud Kras (Zwolle)
- (Netherlands) Etiënne Reijnen (Zwolle)
- (Netherlands) Niek Vossebelt (Zwolle)

2 goals

- (Netherlands) Jop van der Linden (AGOVV)
- (Belgium) Chiró N'Toko (AGOVV)
- (Netherlands) Rachid Ofrany (AGOVV)
- (Netherlands) Hesdey Suart (AGOVV)
- (Cape Verde) Guy Ramos (Dordrecht)
- (Morocco) Rochdi Achenteh (Eindhoven)
- (France) Remy Amieux (Eindhoven)
- (Netherlands) Mark Bloemendaal (Eindhoven)
- (Belgium) Bart Van Den Eede (Eindhoven)
- (Netherlands) Sjors Paridaans (Emmen)
- (Netherlands Antilles) Angelo Zimmerman (Emmen)
- (Netherlands) Roland Bergkamp (Excelsior)
- (Netherlands) Ard Van Peppen (Excelsior)
- (Netherlands) Leen van Steensel (Excelsior)
- (Netherlands) Tim Vincken (Excelsior)
- (Finland) Kari Arkivuo (Go Ahead Eagles)
- (Netherlands) Donny de Groot (Go Ahead Eagles)
- (Netherlands) Nigel Hasselbaink (Go Ahead Eagles)
- (Netherlands) Maikel Kieftenbeld (Go Ahead Eagles)
- (Netherlands) Jhon van Beukering (De Graafschap)
- (Netherlands) Peter Jungschläger (De Graafschap)
- (Netherlands) Joep van den Ouweland (De Graafschap)
- (Netherlands) Vito Wormgoor (De Graafschap)
- (Morocco) Youssef Chida (Helmond Sport)
- (Belgium) Daniel Guijo-Velasco (Helmond Sport)
- (Belgium) Alexandre Bryssinck (MVV)
- (The Gambia) Ebrima Ebou Sillah (MVV)
- (Germany) Philipp Haastrup (MVV)
- (Germany) Tom Van Hyfte (MVV)
- (Burundi) Faty Papy (MVV)
- (Argentina) David Depetris (Omniworld)
- (Netherlands) Jerge Hoefdraad (Omniworld)
- (Netherlands) Mitchell Kappenberg (Omniworld)
- (Netherlands) Marien Willemsen (Omniworld)
- (Netherlands) Bart van Hintum (Oss)
- (Netherlands) Patrick Lip (Oss)
- (Belgium) Nicky Hayen (RBC)
- (Belgium) John Schot (RBC)
- (Netherlands) Ralf Seuntjes (RBC)
- (Netherlands) Koen Brands (Telstar)
- (Netherlands) Nicandro Breeveld (Telstar)
- (Netherlands) Martijn van der Laan (Veendam)
- (Netherlands) Aaron Meijers (Volendam)
- (Netherlands) Yannick de Wit (Volendam)
- (Hungary) Gergő Beliczky (Zwolle)

1 goal

- (Netherlands) Ramon Leeuwin (AGOVV)
- (Netherlands) Olaf Lindenbergh (AGOVV)
- (Netherlands) Nick Mulder (AGOVV)
- (Netherlands) Stanley Tailor (AGOVV)
- (Netherlands) Nyron Wau (AGOVV)
- (Netherlands) Paul Beekmans (Cambuur)
- (Netherlands) Robert van Boxel (Cambuur)
- (Netherlands) Dave Huymans (Cambuur)
- (Netherlands) Rudy Jansen (Cambuur)
- (Netherlands) Dennis van der Ree (Cambuur)
- (Netherlands) Steef Nieuwendaal (Den Bosch)
- (Netherlands) Jordens Peters (Den Bosch)
- (Netherlands) Danny Verbeek (Den Bosch)
- (Netherlands) Stef Wijlaars (Den Bosch)
- (Netherlands) Nick Coster (Dordrecht)
- (Netherlands) Brian Pinas (Dordrecht)
- (Belgium) Prince Asubonteng (Eindhoven)
- (Netherlands) Jean Black (Eindhoven)
- (Netherlands) Bart van Brakel (Eindhoven)
- (Netherlands) Robin Faber (Eindhoven)
- (Serbia) Selmo Kurbegovic (Eindhoven)
- (Brazil) Pedro Beda (Emmen)
- (Brazil) Steven de Blok (Emmen)
- (Netherlands) Tim Siekman (Emmen)
- (Netherlands) Erik van der Ven (Emmen)
- (Netherlands) Guus de Vries (Emmen)
- (Netherlands) Wesley Wakker (Emmen)
- (Netherlands) Sigourney Bandjar (Excelsior)
- (South Africa) Kamohelo Mokotjo (Excelsior)
- (Netherlands) Samir El Moussaoui (Excelsior)
- (Netherlands) Jerson Anes Ribeiro (Excelsior)
- (Cameroon) Marc Mboua (Fortuna Sittard)
- (Belgium) Pieter Nys (Fortuna Sittard)
- (Belgium) Sven Verdonck (Fortuna Sittard)
- (Netherlands) Ramon Voorn (Fortuna Sittard)
- (Netherlands) Paul Voss (Fortuna Sittard)
- (Netherlands) Dennis Hollart (Go Ahead Eagles)
- (Netherlands) Purrel Fränkel (De Graafschap)
- (Netherlands) Martijn Meerdink (De Graafschap)
- (Netherlands) Rogier Meijer (De Graafschap)
- (Turkey) Muslu Nalbantoglu (De Graafschap)
- (Netherlands) Niek Sebens (De Graafschap)
- (Netherlands) Irfan Bachdim (Haarlem)
- (Netherlands) Jeffrey van den Berg (Haarlem)
- (Netherlands) Benjamin van den Broek (Haarlem)
- (Netherlands) Calvin MacIntosch (Haarlem)
- (Netherlands) John Nieuwenburg (Haarlem)
- (Netherlands) Jasmin Ramic (Haarlem)
- (Netherlands) Marvin Wijks (Haarlem)
- (Netherlands) Joost Habraken (Helmond Sport)
- (Netherlands) Sjaak Lettinga (Helmond Sport)
- (Netherlands) Ilja van Leerdam (Helmond Sport)
- (Netherlands) Vincent Weijl (Helmond Sport)
- (Belgium) Gerard Aafjes (MVV)
- (Belgium) Omer Kulga (MVV)
- (Norway) Jonas Olsen (MVV)
- (Sweden) Emra Tahirović (MVV)
- (Netherlands) Richard van Heulen (Omniworld)
- (Netherlands) Wilco Krimp (Omniworld)
- (Netherlands) Mikhail Rosheuvel (Omniworld)
- (Morocco) Chakib Tayeb (Omniworld)
- (Netherlands) Melvin Kolf (Oss)
- (Netherlands) Mike van der Kooy (Oss)
- (Morocco) Aziz Moutawakil (Oss)
- (Belgium) Dirk Schoofs (Oss)
- (Netherlands) Mike Thijssen (Oss)
- (Belgium) Chris de Wagt (Oss)
- (Belgium) Rence van der Wal (Oss)
- (Netherlands) Tjaronn Chery (RBC)
- (Netherlands Antilles) Cuco Martina (RBC)
- (Netherlands) Jerold Promes (Telstar)
- (Netherlands) Gregory Schaken (Telstar)
- (Netherlands) Jeroen Tesselaar (Telstar)
- (Netherlands) Gersom Klok (Veendam)
- (Netherlands) Ewald Koster (Veendam)
- (Netherlands) Lars Lambooij (Veendam)
- (Netherlands) Niek Loohuis (Veendam)
- (Netherlands) Sander Rozema (Veendam)
- (Netherlands) Alair Cruz Vicente (Veendam)
- (Netherlands) Gerard Wiekens (Veendam)
- (Netherlands) Mohammed Ajnane (Volendam)
- (Netherlands) Tim Bakens (Volendam)
- (Netherlands) Gerson Sheotahul (Volendam)
- (Netherlands) Maikel van der Werff (Volendam)
- (Brazil) Eric Fernando Botteghin (Zwolle)

Own goals

- (Netherlands) Mark de Vries (Cambuur, against Excelsior)
- (Netherlands) Robert van Boxel (Cambuur, against MVV)
- (Netherlands Antilles) Angelo Martha (Den Bosch, against Veendam)
- (Netherlands) Johan Versluis (Dordrecht, against MVV)
- (Netherlands) Arjen Bergsma (Emmen, against Dordrecht)
- (Netherlands) Sjors Paridaans (Emmen, against Telstar)
- (Netherlands) Michel Poldervaart (Emmen, against Cambuur)
- (Netherlands) Jelle De Bock (Eindhoven, against Telstar)
- (Netherlands) Ivo Rossen (Eindhoven, against Fortuna Sittard)
- (Netherlands) Norichio Nieveld (Excelsior, against Volendam)
- (Germany) Nico Vanek (Fortuna Sittard, against Haarlem)
- (Netherlands) Joey Suk (Go Ahead Eagles, against Fortuna Sittard)
- (Netherlands) Rogier Meijer (De Graafschap, against AGOVV)
- (Netherlands) Frank Karreman (Haarlem, against Den Bosch)
- (Netherlands) Robert van Westerop (Helmond Sport, against De Graafschap)
- (Germany) Philipp Haastrup (MVV, against AGOVV)
- (Netherlands) Maarten Boddaert (RBC, against Zwolle)
- (Netherlands) Glynor Plet (Telstar, against MVV)
- (Netherlands) Mitch Apau (Veendam, against MVV)
- (Netherlands) Alair Cruz Vicente (Veendam, against AGOVV)
- (Netherlands) Henny Schilder (Volendam, against MVV)
- (Netherlands) Maikel van der Werff (Volendam, against RBC)
- (Brazil) Eric Fernando Botteghin (Zwolle, against Oss)

== Attendances ==
#	Club	Average
1	De Graafschap	10,491
2	Cambuur	8,636
3	Zwolle	5,483
4	MVV	5,418
5	Go Ahead	4,811
6	Den Bosch	4,056
7	Fortuna	3,762
8	Volendam	3,478
9	Veendam	3,296
10	Emmen	3,097
11	Helmond	3,053
12	RBC	2,624
13	AGOVV	2,609
14	Oss	2,124
15	Dordrecht	2,046
16	Eindhoven	2,005
17	Excelsior	1,949
18	Telstar	1,876
19	Omniworld	1,713
20	Haarlem	1,658

== See also ==
- 2009–10 Eredivisie
- 2009–10 KNVB Cup
