= List of Dutch football transfers winter 2010–11 =

This is a list of transfers in Dutch football for the 2010 Winter transfer window. Only moves featuring an Eredivisie side and/or an Eerste Divisie side are listed.

The winter transfer window will open on January 1, 2010, and will close on January 31. Deals may be signed at any given moment in the season, but the actual transfer may only take place during the transfer window. Unattached players may sign at any moment.

== Eredivisie ==
=== ADO Den Haag ===
In: Note: Flags indicate national team as defined under FIFA eligibility rules; some limited exceptions apply. Players may hold more than one non-FIFA nationality.

No.	Pos.	Nation	Player
13	FW	ANT	Raily Ignacio (loan return from FC Dordrecht)
27	FW	NED	Jordy Brouwer (from (England) Liverpool F.C.)
34	DF	BEL	Chiró N'Toko (free agent)

Out: Note: Flags indicate national team as defined under FIFA eligibility rules; some limited exceptions apply. Players may hold more than one non-FIFA nationality.

No.	Pos.	Nation	Player
10	MF	NED	Ricky van den Bergh (to Sparta Rotterdam)
17	DF	NED	Kai van Hese (on loan to FC Dordrecht)
18	MF	NED	Leroy Resodihardjo (on loan to Almere City FC)
20	FW	NED	Santy Hulst (on loan to FC Dordrecht)
23	GK	GER	Nico Pellatz (on loan to Excelsior)
47	FW	NED	Jarchinio Antonia (on loan to Go Ahead Eagles)

=== AFC Ajax ===
In:

Note: Flags indicate national team as defined under FIFA eligibility rules; some limited exceptions apply. Players may hold more than one non-FIFA nationality.

No.	Pos.	Nation	Player
22	DF	URU	Bruno Silva (loan return from (Brazil) Internacional)
27	FW	ARG	Darío Cvitanich (loan return from (Mexico) C.F. Pachuca)
36	GK	NED	Ronald Graafland (free agent)
--	DF	FIN	Henri Toivomäki (from (Finland) FC Lahti)

Out: Note: Flags indicate national team as defined under FIFA eligibility rules; some limited exceptions apply. Players may hold more than one non-FIFA nationality.

No.	Pos.	Nation	Player
11	MF	NED	Urby Emanuelson (to (Italy) AC Milan)
16	FW	URU	Luis Suárez (to (England) Liverpool F.C.)
19	MF	FIN	Teemu Tainio (to (United States) New York Red Bulls)
24	FW	NED	Marvin Zeegelaar (on loan to Excelsior)
31	FW	CRO	Darko Bodul (to (Portugal) CD Nacional)
35	FW	EGY	Mido (to (Egypt) Zamalek)
--	DF	NED	Rene Osei Kofi (released, was on loan to Almere City FC)

=== AZ ===
In: Note: Flags indicate national team as defined under FIFA eligibility rules; some limited exceptions apply. Players may hold more than one non-FIFA nationality.

No.	Pos.	Nation	Player
6	DF	NED	Etienne Reijnen (from FC Zwolle)
41	DF	NED	Toine van Huizen (loan return from Telstar)

Out: Note: Flags indicate national team as defined under FIFA eligibility rules; some limited exceptions apply. Players may hold more than one non-FIFA nationality.

No.	Pos.	Nation	Player
2	DF	NED	Kew Jaliens (to (Poland) Wisla Krakow)
9	FW	BRA	Jonathas (to (Italy) Brescia)
28	DF	BEL	Gill Swerts (on loan to Feyenoord)
30	MF	AUS	James Holland (on loan to Sparta)
33	DF	NED	Gijs Luirink (on loan to SC Cambuur)

=== Excelsior ===
In: Note: Flags indicate national team as defined under FIFA eligibility rules; some limited exceptions apply. Players may hold more than one non-FIFA nationality.

No.	Pos.	Nation	Player
1	GK	GER	Nico Pellatz (on loan from ADO Den Haag)
14	MF	NED	Geert Arend Roorda (on loan from SC Heerenveen)
21	MF	NED	Edwin de Graaf (on loan from (Scotland) Hibernian FC)
22	MF	GER	Benjamin Baltes (free agent)
26	FW	NED	Marvin Zeegelaar (on loan from Ajax)
--	FW	HUN	András Simon (free agent)

Out: Note: Flags indicate national team as defined under FIFA eligibility rules; some limited exceptions apply. Players may hold more than one non-FIFA nationality.

No.	Pos.	Nation	Player
1	GK	GRE	Kostas Lamprou (loan return to Feyenoord)
14	MF	NED	Jerson Anes Ribeiro (on loan to Fortuna Sittard)
21	MF	NED	Karim Mossaoui (on loan to Fortuna Sittard)
24	DF	NED	Delano Cohen (on loan to Almere City FC)

=== Feyenoord ===
In: Note: Flags indicate national team as defined under FIFA eligibility rules; some limited exceptions apply. Players may hold more than one non-FIFA nationality.

No.	Pos.	Nation	Player
3	DF	BEL	Gill Swerts (on loan from AZ Alkmaar)
6	MF	NED	Marcel Meeuwis (on loan from (Germany) Borussia Mönchengladbach)
19	MF	HUN	Krisztián Simon (on loan from (Hungary) Újpest)
24	FW	DEN	Søren Larsen (on loan from (France) Toulouse FC)
33	GK	GRE	Kostas Lamprou (loan return from Excelsior)
34	FW	JPN	Ryo Miyaichi (on loan from (England) Arsenal FC)

Out: Note: Flags indicate national team as defined under FIFA eligibility rules; some limited exceptions apply. Players may hold more than one non-FIFA nationality.

No.	Pos.	Nation	Player
6	MF	MAR	Karim El Ahmadi (on loan to (United Arab Emirates) Al Ahli)
9	FW	IDN	Jhon van Beukering (to (Indonesia) Pelita Jaya)
19	DF	DEN	Michael Lumb (on loan to (Denmark) Aalborg, was on loan from (Russia) Zenit St. Petersburg)
24	FW	RUS	Fyodor Smolov (loan return to (Russia) Dynamo Moscow)

=== De Graafschap ===
In: Note: Flags indicate national team as defined under FIFA eligibility rules; some limited exceptions apply. Players may hold more than one non-FIFA nationality.

No.	Pos.	Nation	Player
7	DF	ANT	Tyrone Loran (from NAC Breda)

Out: Note: Flags indicate national team as defined under FIFA eligibility rules; some limited exceptions apply. Players may hold more than one non-FIFA nationality.

No.	Pos.	Nation	Player

=== FC Groningen ===
In: Note: Flags indicate national team as defined under FIFA eligibility rules; some limited exceptions apply. Players may hold more than one non-FIFA nationality.

No.	Pos.	Nation	Player

Out: Note: Flags indicate national team as defined under FIFA eligibility rules; some limited exceptions apply. Players may hold more than one non-FIFA nationality.

No.	Pos.	Nation	Player
--	FW	NED	Serhat Koç (on loan to FC Eindhoven, was on loan to SC Cambuur)

=== SC Heerenveen ===
In: Note: Flags indicate national team as defined under FIFA eligibility rules; some limited exceptions apply. Players may hold more than one non-FIFA nationality.

No.	Pos.	Nation	Player

Out: Note: Flags indicate national team as defined under FIFA eligibility rules; some limited exceptions apply. Players may hold more than one non-FIFA nationality.

No.	Pos.	Nation	Player
5	DF	MAR	Youssef El Akchaoui (on loan to VVV-Venlo)
6	MF	NED	Geert Arend Roorda (on loan to Excelsior)
13	FW	NOR	Tarik Elyounoussi (to (Norway) Fredrikstad FK)
21	FW	CZE	Michal Papadopulos (to (Russia) Zhemchuzhina Sochi)
27	GK	NED	Diederik Bangma (on loan to FC Emmen)

=== Heracles Almelo ===
In: Note: Flags indicate national team as defined under FIFA eligibility rules; some limited exceptions apply. Players may hold more than one non-FIFA nationality.

No.	Pos.	Nation	Player
19	FW	NED	Ellery Cairo (free agent)

Out: Note: Flags indicate national team as defined under FIFA eligibility rules; some limited exceptions apply. Players may hold more than one non-FIFA nationality.

No.	Pos.	Nation	Player
6	MF	NED	Resit Schuurman (to Go Ahead Eagles)
33	MF	NED	Alexander Bannink (loan return to FC Twente)

=== NAC Breda ===
In: Note: Flags indicate national team as defined under FIFA eligibility rules; some limited exceptions apply. Players may hold more than one non-FIFA nationality.

No.	Pos.	Nation	Player
5	FW	NED	Julian Jenner (on loan from Vitesse Arnhem)

Out: Note: Flags indicate national team as defined under FIFA eligibility rules; some limited exceptions apply. Players may hold more than one non-FIFA nationality.

No.	Pos.	Nation	Player
4	DF	ANT	Tyrone Loran (to De Graafschap)
27	MF	NED	Marvin van der Pluijm (to (United States) Dayton Dutch Lions)

=== NEC ===
In: Note: Flags indicate national team as defined under FIFA eligibility rules; some limited exceptions apply. Players may hold more than one non-FIFA nationality.

No.	Pos.	Nation	Player

Out: Note: Flags indicate national team as defined under FIFA eligibility rules; some limited exceptions apply. Players may hold more than one non-FIFA nationality.

No.	Pos.	Nation	Player
9	FW	SWE	Erton Fejzullahu (on loan to (Denmark) Randers FC)

=== PSV ===
In: Note: Flags indicate national team as defined under FIFA eligibility rules; some limited exceptions apply. Players may hold more than one non-FIFA nationality.

No.	Pos.	Nation	Player

Out: Note: Flags indicate national team as defined under FIFA eligibility rules; some limited exceptions apply. Players may hold more than one non-FIFA nationality.

No.	Pos.	Nation	Player
11	FW	MAR	Nordin Amrabat (to (Turkey) Kayserispor)
20	MF	NED	Ibrahim Afellay (to (Spain) FC Barcelona)
23	MF	BEL	Funso Ojo (on loan to VVV-Venlo)
61	GK	BEL	Bram Castro (to (Belgium) Sint-Truiden)

=== Roda JC ===
In: Note: Flags indicate national team as defined under FIFA eligibility rules; some limited exceptions apply. Players may hold more than one non-FIFA nationality.

No.	Pos.	Nation	Player
23	FW	NED	Wiljan Pluim (on loan from Vitesse Arnhem)

Out: Note: Flags indicate national team as defined under FIFA eligibility rules; some limited exceptions apply. Players may hold more than one non-FIFA nationality.

No.	Pos.	Nation	Player
34	FW	BEL	Jeanvion Yulu-Matondo (released)

=== FC Twente ===
In: Note: Flags indicate national team as defined under FIFA eligibility rules; some limited exceptions apply. Players may hold more than one non-FIFA nationality.

No.	Pos.	Nation	Player
2	DF	USA	Oguchi Onyewu (on loan from (Italy) AC Milan)
17	MF	NED	Arnold Bruggink (free agent)
18	MF	NED	Alexander Bannink (loan return from Heracles)

Out: Note: Flags indicate national team as defined under FIFA eligibility rules; some limited exceptions apply. Players may hold more than one non-FIFA nationality.

No.	Pos.	Nation	Player
14	FW	RSA	Bernard Parker (on loan to (Greece) Panserraikos F.C.)
27	MF	CRO	Dario Vujičević (on loan to VVV-Venlo)
32	FW	NOR	Flamur Kastrati (on loan to (Germany) VfL Osnabrück)
36	DF	AUT	Michael Schimpelsberger (to (Austria) Rapid Wien)

=== FC Utrecht ===
In: Note: Flags indicate national team as defined under FIFA eligibility rules; some limited exceptions apply. Players may hold more than one non-FIFA nationality.

No.	Pos.	Nation	Player
6	MF	NED	Kevin Strootman (from Sparta Rotterdam)

Out: Note: Flags indicate national team as defined under FIFA eligibility rules; some limited exceptions apply. Players may hold more than one non-FIFA nationality.

No.	Pos.	Nation	Player
16	GK	NED	Wesley de Ruiter (to FC Den Bosch)
22	DF	NED	Sander Keller (to (Switzerland) Neuchâtel Xamax)

=== Vitesse ===
In: Note: Flags indicate national team as defined under FIFA eligibility rules; some limited exceptions apply. Players may hold more than one non-FIFA nationality.

No.	Pos.	Nation	Player
4	MF	ESP	Jordi (from (England) Swansea)
9	FW	CIV	Bony Wilfried (from (Czech Republic) Sparta Prague)
14	FW	NGR	Haruna Babangida (free agent)
16	DF	JPN	Michihiro Yasuda (from (Japan) Gamba Osaka)
20	MF	ESP	Martí Riverola (on loan from (Spain) FC Barcelona B)

Out: Note: Flags indicate national team as defined under FIFA eligibility rules; some limited exceptions apply. Players may hold more than one non-FIFA nationality.

No.	Pos.	Nation	Player
3	DF	NED	Kevin van Diermen (on loan to Go Ahead Eagles)
4	DF	NED	Civard Sprockel (to (Cyprus) Anorthosis Famagusta)
5	DF	NED	Jeroen Drost (on loan to FC Zwolle)
9	FW	SWE	Lasse Nilsson (to (Sweden) Elfsborg)
16	MF	GHA	Laryea Kingston (released)
26	FW	NED	Wiljan Pluim (on loan to Roda JC)
27	FW	NED	Julian Jenner (on loan to NAC Breda)
90	MF	NED	Nacer Barazite (to Austria Wien, was on loan from (England) Arsenal FC)

=== VVV Venlo ===
In: Note: Flags indicate national team as defined under FIFA eligibility rules; some limited exceptions apply. Players may hold more than one non-FIFA nationality.

No.	Pos.	Nation	Player
21	MF	CRO	Dario Vujičević (on loan from FC Twente)
23	FW	NGR	Ahmed Musa (from (Nigeria) Kano Pillars)
24	FW	JPN	Robert Cullen (free agent)
26	MF	BEL	Funso Ojo (on loan from PSV Eindhoven)]
44	DF	MAR	Youssef El Akchaoui (on loan from SC Heerenveen)
--	FW	NED	Soufiane Dadda (loan return from Fortuna Sittard)

Out: Note: Flags indicate national team as defined under FIFA eligibility rules; some limited exceptions apply. Players may hold more than one non-FIFA nationality.

No.	Pos.	Nation	Player
21	FW	POR	Diogo Viana (loan return to (Portugal) FC Porto)
27	DF	NED	Patrick Paauwe (retired)

=== Willem II ===
In: Note: Flags indicate national team as defined under FIFA eligibility rules; some limited exceptions apply. Players may hold more than one non-FIFA nationality.

No.	Pos.	Nation	Player
9	FW	CZE	David Strihavka (on loan from (Czech Republic) Viktoria Plzen)
12	DF	GER	Gerrit Pressel (on loan from (Germany) HSV II)
20	FW	SLO	Dragan Jelic (on loan from (Slovenia) NK Maribor)
51	GK	SRB	Vladan Kujovic (free agent)

Out: Note: Flags indicate national team as defined under FIFA eligibility rules; some limited exceptions apply. Players may hold more than one non-FIFA nationality.

No.	Pos.	Nation	Player
12	MF	NED	Junior Livramento (on loan to RBC Roosendaal)
20	MF	NED	Jasper Waalkens (on loan to Helmond Sport)
24	DF	NED	Danny Schenkel (to (Cyprus) AEK Larnaca)

== Eerste Divisie ==
=== AGOVV Apeldoorn ===
In: Note: Flags indicate national team as defined under FIFA eligibility rules; some limited exceptions apply. Players may hold more than one non-FIFA nationality.

No.	Pos.	Nation	Player
2	DF	NED	Haci Bulut (free agent)
16	FW	NED	Roy de Ruiter (from Jong Vitesse)
23	MF	BRA	Kevin Tikhomiroff (from (Brazil) ABC Futebol Clube)
24	DF	NED	Randy Rustenberg (from SC Cambuur)

Out: Note: Flags indicate national team as defined under FIFA eligibility rules; some limited exceptions apply. Players may hold more than one non-FIFA nationality.

No.	Pos.	Nation	Player
3	DF	NED	René Bot (retired)
7	FW	NED	Ugur Yildirim (released)
11	MF	NED	Julius Wille (on loan to (United States) Dayton Dutch Lions)
16	FW	BEL	Jasson Conrad (released)

=== Almere City FC ===
In: Note: Flags indicate national team as defined under FIFA eligibility rules; some limited exceptions apply. Players may hold more than one non-FIFA nationality.

No.	Pos.	Nation	Player
—	GK	GRE	Kostas Peristerides (free agent)
—	DF	NED	Mitchell Burgzorg (free agent)
—	MF	NED	Leroy Resodihardjo (on loan from ADO Den Haag)
—	MF	NED	Paul de Lange (on loan from FC Volendam)
—	MF	NED	Rik Schouw (on loan from Jong Ajax)
—	FW	NED	Thijs Sluijter (on loan from FC Volendam)
—	FW	NED	Iwan Redan (from Sparta Rotterdam)

Out: Note: Flags indicate national team as defined under FIFA eligibility rules; some limited exceptions apply. Players may hold more than one non-FIFA nationality.

No.	Pos.	Nation	Player
—	DF	NED	Rene Osei Kofi (released, was on loan from AFC Ajax)

=== SC Cambuur ===
In: Note: Flags indicate national team as defined under FIFA eligibility rules; some limited exceptions apply. Players may hold more than one non-FIFA nationality.

No.	Pos.	Nation	Player
2	DF	NED	Martijn van der Laan (on loan from BV Veendam)
5	DF	NED	Dennis van der Wal (from FC Zwolle)
7	FW	NED	Alexander Prent (free agent)
24	DF	NED	Gijs Luirink (on loan from AZ Alkmaar)

Out: Note: Flags indicate national team as defined under FIFA eligibility rules; some limited exceptions apply. Players may hold more than one non-FIFA nationality.

No.	Pos.	Nation	Player
2	DF	NED	Rudy Jansen (to FC Zwolle)
5	DF	NED	Randy Rustenberg (to AGOVV Apeldoorn)
11	FW	NED	Nassir Maachi (on loan to FC Zwolle)
26	FW	NED	Serhat Koç (on loan to FC Eindhoven, was on loan from FC Groningen)
30	DF	SVK	Zdenko Kapralik (to (Slovakia) Zilina)

=== FC Den Bosch ===
In: Note: Flags indicate national team as defined under FIFA eligibility rules; some limited exceptions apply. Players may hold more than one non-FIFA nationality.

No.	Pos.	Nation	Player
1	GK	NED	Wesley de Ruiter (from FC Utrecht)

Out: Note: Flags indicate national team as defined under FIFA eligibility rules; some limited exceptions apply. Players may hold more than one non-FIFA nationality.

No.	Pos.	Nation	Player
9	FW	NED	John Verhoek (to (France) Stade Rennes)

=== FC Dordrecht ===
In: Note: Flags indicate national team as defined under FIFA eligibility rules; some limited exceptions apply. Players may hold more than one non-FIFA nationality.

No.	Pos.	Nation	Player
—	DF	NED	Kai van Hese (on loan from ADO Den Haag)
—	MF	NED	Marcel van der Sloot (from RBC Roosendaal)
—	MF	NED	Björn Vlasblom (from Sparta Rotterdam)
—	FW	NED	Santy Hulst (on loan from ADO Den Haag)
—	FW	NED	Shayron Curiel (from Sparta Rotterdam)
—	FW	NED	Jessy Mayele (from Sparta Rotterdam)

Out: Note: Flags indicate national team as defined under FIFA eligibility rules; some limited exceptions apply. Players may hold more than one non-FIFA nationality.

No.	Pos.	Nation	Player
—	MF	CPV	Guy Ramos (to RKC Waalwijk)
—	FW	ANT	Raily Ignacio (loan return to ADO Den Haag)
—	FW	NED	Vlatko Lazic (to RBC Roosendaal)

=== FC Eindhoven ===
In: Note: Flags indicate national team as defined under FIFA eligibility rules; some limited exceptions apply. Players may hold more than one non-FIFA nationality.

No.	Pos.	Nation	Player
25	FW	NED	Serhat Koç (on loan from FC Groningen, was on loan to SC Cambuur)

Out: Note: Flags indicate national team as defined under FIFA eligibility rules; some limited exceptions apply. Players may hold more than one non-FIFA nationality.

No.	Pos.	Nation	Player
23	MF	NED	Mark Bloemendaal (released)

=== FC Emmen ===
In: Note: Flags indicate national team as defined under FIFA eligibility rules; some limited exceptions apply. Players may hold more than one non-FIFA nationality.

No.	Pos.	Nation	Player
—	GK	NED	Diederik Bangma (on loan from SC Heerenveen)
—	DF	GER	Marcel Piesche (free agent)
—	MF	NED	Qays Shayesteh (from BV Veendam)
—	FW	NED	Randy Wolters (from Jong FC Utrecht)

Out: Note: Flags indicate national team as defined under FIFA eligibility rules; some limited exceptions apply. Players may hold more than one non-FIFA nationality.

No.	Pos.	Nation	Player
—	FW	SUI	Milos Malenovic (on loan to BV Veendam)

=== Fortuna Sittard ===
In: Note: Flags indicate national team as defined under FIFA eligibility rules; some limited exceptions apply. Players may hold more than one non-FIFA nationality.

No.	Pos.	Nation	Player
—	DF	NED	Randel Shakison (from Jong Ajax)
—	DF	NED	Fernando Ricksen (free agent)
—	DF	GER	Stevan Thesker (on loan from Jong FC Twente)
—	MF	NED	Jerson Anes Ribeiro (on loan from Excelsior)
—	MF	NED	Karim Mossaoui (on loan from Excelsior)
—	MF	GER	Marcus Rychlik (free agent)
—	FW	EST	Henrik Ojamaa (on loan from (Germany) Alemannia Aachen)
—	FW	NED	Paddy John (from RKC Waalwijk)

Out: Note: Flags indicate national team as defined under FIFA eligibility rules; some limited exceptions apply. Players may hold more than one non-FIFA nationality.

No.	Pos.	Nation	Player
—	FW	NED	Soufiane Dadda (loan return to VVV-Venlo)

=== Go Ahead Eagles ===
In: Note: Flags indicate national team as defined under FIFA eligibility rules; some limited exceptions apply. Players may hold more than one non-FIFA nationality.

No.	Pos.	Nation	Player
—	DF	NED	Kevin van Diermen (on loan from Vitesse Arnhem)
—	MF	NED	Resit Schuurman (from Heracles)
—	FW	NED	Jarchinio Antonia (on loan from ADO Den Haag)

Out: Note: Flags indicate national team as defined under FIFA eligibility rules; some limited exceptions apply. Players may hold more than one non-FIFA nationality.

No.	Pos.	Nation	Player
—	DF	FIN	Marco Parnela (retired)
—	DF	NED	Diego Michiels (to (Indonesia) Pelita Jaya)
—	MF	NED	Jordi Zuidam (to RBC Roosendaal, was already on loan)
—	FW	IDN	Jhon van Beukering (released)

=== Helmond Sport ===
In: Note: Flags indicate national team as defined under FIFA eligibility rules; some limited exceptions apply. Players may hold more than one non-FIFA nationality.

No.	Pos.	Nation	Player
9	FW	NED	Ibad Muhamadu (free agent)
14	MF	NED	Jasper Waalkens (on loan from Willem II)
18	MF	NED	Etienne Esajas (free agent)

Out: Note: Flags indicate national team as defined under FIFA eligibility rules; some limited exceptions apply. Players may hold more than one non-FIFA nationality.

No.	Pos.	Nation	Player]
14	MF	NED	Sjaak Lettinga (to Telstar)

=== MVV ===
In: Note: Flags indicate national team as defined under FIFA eligibility rules; some limited exceptions apply. Players may hold more than one non-FIFA nationality.

No.	Pos.	Nation	Player
10	FW	NGR	Tosin Dosunmu (from (Belgium) Germinal Beerschot)
15	DF	BEL	Marco Ingrao (free agent)
16	GK	BEL	Cliff Mardulier (free agent)
18	GK	GER	Robert Böhm (free agent)

Out: Note: Flags indicate national team as defined under FIFA eligibility rules; some limited exceptions apply. Players may hold more than one non-FIFA nationality.

No.	Pos.	Nation	Player

=== RBC Roosendaal ===
In: Note: Flags indicate national team as defined under FIFA eligibility rules; some limited exceptions apply. Players may hold more than one non-FIFA nationality.

No.	Pos.	Nation	Player
4	MF	NED	Iderlindo Moreno Freire (free agent)
6	MF	NED	Jordi Zuidam (from Go Ahead Eagles, was already on loan)
13	MF	NED	Junior Livramento (on loan from Willem II)
14	FW	NED	Vlatko Lazic (from FC Dordrecht)

Out: Note: Flags indicate national team as defined under FIFA eligibility rules; some limited exceptions apply. Players may hold more than one non-FIFA nationality.

No.	Pos.	Nation	Player
10	MF	NED	Marcel van der Sloot (to FC Dordrecht)
14	MF	NED	Charlie van den Ouweland (released)

=== RKC Waalwijk ===
In: Note: Flags indicate national team as defined under FIFA eligibility rules; some limited exceptions apply. Players may hold more than one non-FIFA nationality.

No.	Pos.	Nation	Player
18	MF	CPV	Guy Ramos (from FC Dordrecht)
19	FW	ALG	Karim Bridji (free agent)

Out: Note: Flags indicate national team as defined under FIFA eligibility rules; some limited exceptions apply. Players may hold more than one non-FIFA nationality.

No.	Pos.	Nation	Player
15	FW	NED	Paddy John (to Fortuna Sittard)
18	DF	NED	Jurgen Colin (to (Cyprus) Anorthosis Famagusta)

=== Sparta Rotterdam ===
In: Note: Flags indicate national team as defined under FIFA eligibility rules; some limited exceptions apply. Players may hold more than one non-FIFA nationality.

No.	Pos.	Nation	Player
—	GK	NED	Oscar Moens (free agent)
—	DF	ESP	Carlos Delgado (on loan from (Spain) UD Almería B)
—	MF	AUS	James Holland (on loan from AZ)
—	MF	NED	Ricky van den Bergh (from ADO Den Haag)
—	FW	NED	Mario Bilate (from XerxesDZB)

Out: Note: Flags indicate national team as defined under FIFA eligibility rules; some limited exceptions apply. Players may hold more than one non-FIFA nationality.

No.	Pos.	Nation	Player
—	DF	GHA	Emmanuel Boakye (released)
—	DF	AUS	Jimmy Downey (released)
—	MF	NZL	Cory Chettleburgh (released)
—	MF	NED	Kevin Strootman (to FC Utrecht)
—	MF	NED	Björn Vlasblom (to FC Dordrecht)
—	FW	NED	Iwan Redan (to Almere City FC)
—	FW	NED	Jessy Mayele (to FC Dordrecht)
—	FW	NED	Shayron Curiel (to FC Dordrecht)

=== Telstar ===
In: Note: Flags indicate national team as defined under FIFA eligibility rules; some limited exceptions apply. Players may hold more than one non-FIFA nationality.

No.	Pos.	Nation	Player
7	MF	NED	Sjaak Lettinga (from Helmond Sport)
20	DF	ENG	Jack Mills (on loan from (England) Reading F.C.)
23	GK	SLE	Patrick Bantamoi (from (Finland) Inter Turku)
30	FW	ENG	Jacob Walcott (on loan from (England) Reading F.C.)

Out: Note: Flags indicate national team as defined under FIFA eligibility rules; some limited exceptions apply. Players may hold more than one non-FIFA nationality.

No.	Pos.	Nation	Player
21	DF	NED	Toine van Huizen (loan return to AZ)

=== BV Veendam ===
In: Note: Flags indicate national team as defined under FIFA eligibility rules; some limited exceptions apply. Players may hold more than one non-FIFA nationality.

No.	Pos.	Nation	Player
12	MF	CAN	Alexander Marello (from (Canada) Vancouver Thunderbirds)
21	FW	SUI	Milos Malenovic (on loan from FC Emmen)

Out: Note: Flags indicate national team as defined under FIFA eligibility rules; some limited exceptions apply. Players may hold more than one non-FIFA nationality.

No.	Pos.	Nation	Player
11	MF	NED	Qays Shayesteh (to FC Emmen)
12	MF	PHI	Jason de Jong (released)
14	FW	CAN	Andrew Ornoch (to (Canada) Mississauga Eagles FC)
21	DF	NED	Martijn van der Laan (on loan to SC Cambuur)

=== FC Volendam ===
In: Note: Flags indicate national team as defined under FIFA eligibility rules; some limited exceptions apply. Players may hold more than one non-FIFA nationality.

No.	Pos.	Nation	Player
—	DF	NED	Arsenio Halfhuid (on loan from Aston Villa)
—	MF	NED	Rick Kruys (from (Sweden) Malmö)

Out: Note: Flags indicate national team as defined under FIFA eligibility rules; some limited exceptions apply. Players may hold more than one non-FIFA nationality.

No.	Pos.	Nation	Player
—	MF	NED	Paul de Lange (on loan to Almere City FC)
—	FW	NED	Thijs Sluijter (on loan to Almere City FC)

=== FC Zwolle ===
In: Note: Flags indicate national team as defined under FIFA eligibility rules; some limited exceptions apply. Players may hold more than one non-FIFA nationality.

No.	Pos.	Nation	Player
—	DF	NED	Jeroen Drost (on loan from Vitesse Arnhem)
—	DF	NED	Rudy Jansen (from SC Cambuur)
—	FW	NED	Nassir Maachi (on loan from SC Cambuur)

Out: Note: Flags indicate national team as defined under FIFA eligibility rules; some limited exceptions apply. Players may hold more than one non-FIFA nationality.

No.	Pos.	Nation	Player
—	DF	NED	Etienne Reijnen (to AZ Alkmaar)
—	DF	NED	Dennis van der Wal (to SC Cambuur)

== See also ==
- Football in the Netherlands
- Transfer window
