= Geoffrey Galatà =

Dutch football player (born 1984)

Personal information
- Full name: Geoffrey Angelo Rosario Galatà
- Date of birth: 6 March 1984 (age 42)
- Place of birth: Amsterdam, Netherlands
- Height: 1.75 m (5 ft 9 in)
- Position: Defender

Youth career
- Blauw Wit
- Ajax
- AFC

Senior career*
Years	Team	Apps	(Gls)
2003–2008	Stormvogels Telstar	111	(3)
2008–2011	TOP Oss	70	(4)
2011–2012	Sparta Nijkerk		
2012–2013	Quick Boys		
2013–2016	AFC	59	(2)
- * Club domestic league appearances and goals

Geoffrey Angelo Rosario Galatà (born 6 March 1984) is a Dutch former professional footballer who played as a centre back.

== Career ==
Born in Amsterdam to an Italian father and a Dutch mother, Galatà started playing football for local clubs Blauw Wit and AFC. After some years, he joined the Ajax youth academy. His professional career started at Stormvogels Telstar, where he made his debut in the 2003–04 season. In the summer of 2008, his contract with Telstar expired and he left on a free to TOP Oss. There, he initially played on an amateur basis, but on 17 November 2008, Galatà signed a professional contract until mid-2009. Three days later, he scored a bicycle kick against AGOVV Apeldoorn. In 2011, Galatà moved to Sparta Nijkerk and a year later to Quick Boys. From 2013 to 2016 he played for his former side, AFC. He announced his retirement on 11 May 2016 before a match against Koninklijke HFC, after suffering a series of knee injuries.

== Honours ==
=== Club ===
FC Oss

- Topklasse Sunday: 2010–11
