= Schaken =

Schaken is a surname. Notable people with the surname include:

- Ruben Schaken (born 1982), Dutch footballer
- Gregory Schaken (born 1989), Dutch footballer

== See also ==
- Chess - alternate language
