= Alair (disambiguation) =

Alair is a town in the state of Telangana in India. Alair may also refer to:

- Alair (Assembly constituency), constituency of the Telangana Legislative Assembly
- Alair (footballer) (born 1982), Brazilian professional footballer
- Alair Cruz Vicente (born 1981), Brazilian professional footballer
