= Bart van Brakel =

Dutch footballer

Personal information
- Full name: Bart van Brakel
- Date of birth: 5 April 1987 (age 39)
- Place of birth: Wageningen, Netherlands
- Position: Midfielder

Youth career
- RVW
- ONA '53
- NEC

Senior career*
Years	Team	Apps	(Gls)
2007–2008	NEC	4	(0)
2008–2011	Eindhoven	93	(4)
2011–2013	FC Den Bosch	62	(6)
2013–2014	Cambuur	8	(0)
2014	FC Oss	0	(0)
2015–2017	DOVO		
2017–2022	DUNO		
- * Club domestic league appearances and goals

Bart van Brakel (born 5 April 1987) is a Dutch retired footballer who played as a midfielder.

== Club career ==
A holding midfielder, van Brakel formerly played for NEC, FC Eindhoven, FC Den Bosch and moved to SC Cambuur in June 2013.

He joined FC Oss in summer 2014, only to quit playing professionally in 2014 to focus on a career outside football. He went on to play amateur football for DOVO. In April 2017, he joined DUNO.
