= Stef Wijlaars =

Dutch footballer (born 1988)

Personal information
- Full name: Stef Marinus Wijlaars
- Date of birth: 19 January 1988 (age 38)
- Place of birth: Mierlo, Netherlands
- Height: 1.74 m (5 ft 9 in)
- Position: Midfielder

Youth career
- SC Mifano
- PSV

Senior career*
Years	Team	Apps	(Gls)
2008–2010	Den Bosch	24	(1)
2010–2013	Senica	69	(4)
2013	Sigma Olomouc	6	(0)
2014–2015	Gemert		
- * Club domestic league appearances and goals

Stef Marinus Wijlaars (born 19 January 1988) is a Dutch former professional footballer who played as a midfielder. After his playing career, he began working as a youth coach.

== Career ==
He previously played for FC Den Bosch, FK Senica and Sigma Olomouc. He retired as part of amateur club Gemert in 2015 due to injuries.

== Post-playing career ==
In 2017, Wijlaars initiated his career as a youth coach within the Den Bosch youth academy, eventually becoming head of the academy. His trajectory led to his appointment, in 2023, as the coordinator for middle-tier youth teams (under-13 to under-16) at Ajax.
