= Jonas Faraasen Olsen =

Norwegian footballer (born 1988)

Jonas Olsen
Personal information
- Full name: Jonas Faraasen Olsen
- Date of birth: 23 April 1988 (age 38)
- Place of birth: Halden, Norway
- Height: 1.88 m (6 ft 2 in)
- Position: Striker

Team information
- Current team: Birkebeineren

Youth career
- –: Berg
- –: Kvik Halden

Senior career*
Years	Team	Apps	(Gls)
2005–2009	Kvik Halden	80	(97)
2009–2011	MVV	33	(5)
2011–2012	Kvik Halden		
2013–	Birkebeineren		
- * Club domestic league appearances and goals as of 18:27, 16 March 2011 (UTC)

Jonas Faraasen Olsen (born 23 April 1988) is a Norwegian professional footballer who plays as a striker for Kvik Halden FK.

== Career ==
He played for Berg IL as a youngster, but joined Kvik Halden FK as a teenager. He was drafted into the senior team ahead of the 2005 season. In the 2006 season he made his mark as a striker, scoring 20 goals. In 2007, he followed with 24 league goals. In 2008, he improved further, scoring 37 league goals. This also earned him Halden Arbeiderblad's Silver Ball award, for best footballer in the Halden region.

After the 2008 season he had a trial with Hamarkameratene. In July 2009 he joined Dutch side MVV. He scored his first league goal for MVV in August 2009, in the 1–1 draw against Cambuur Leeuwarden.

After returning to Kvik, he went on to IF Birkebeineren ahead of the 2013 season.

== Personal life ==
He is a son of Jan Erik Olsen, a former goalkeeper for Kvik Halden.
