= Jean Black =

Congolese-born Angolan footballer

Personal information
- Full name: Jean Black
- Date of birth: 10 March 1989 (age 37)
- Place of birth: Kinshasa, Zaire
- Height: 1.72 m (5 ft 8 in)
- Position: Forward

Team information
- Current team: SV Herkol

Youth career
- 2006–2008: PSV
- 2008–2009: NEC

Senior career*
Years	Team	Apps	(Gls)
2009–2010	Eindhoven	6	(1)
2010–2011	FC Oss	36	(13)
2012–2013	De Treffers	26	(13)
2013–2014	Turnhout	21	(1)
2014–2015	Krabi	28	(16)
2015–2016	RWDM		
2016	De Treffers	11	(2)
2016	EVV	0	(0)
2016–2020	Esperanza Pelt	93	(17)
2020–2021	K. Achel VV		
2022–	SV Herkol		

International career
2009	Angola U-20	0	(0)
- * Club domestic league appearances and goals as of 15:51, 5 March 2021 (UTC)

Jean Black (born 10 March 1989 in Kinshasa) is a Congolese-born Angolan footballer who plays for SV Herkol.

== Club career ==
He left FC Oss in October 2011 after failing to become a regular in their starting line-up and moved into amateur football with De Treffers. In summer 2013 he moved to Belgian side Turnhout. After spells in Thailand and Angola he returned to Belgium in to play for RWDM in the second half of 2015.

He returned to De Treffers in January 2016, only to leave them in the summer of the same year.

He joined EVV in summer 2016 before switching to Esperanza Pelt later that year.

He signed for K. Achel VV in summer 2020. In January 2022, Black signed for SV Herkol for the upcoming 2022–23 season.

== Personal life ==
Black also works as a preacher in the Christian community.
