= Jasper Waalkens =

Dutch footballer

Personal information
- Full name: Jasper Waalkens
- Date of birth: 13 February 1989 (age 37)
- Place of birth: Schijndel, Netherlands
- Height: 1.79 m (5 ft 10 1/2 in)
- Position: Winger

Team information
- Current team: DOVO (on loan from SV Spakenburg)
- Number: 8

Youth career
- Avanti'31
- Den Bosch
- 2002–2008: PSV

Senior career*
Years	Team	Apps	(Gls)
2009–2011	Willem II	12	(0)
2011	→ Helmond Sport (loan)	10	(0)
2011–2014	FC Eindhoven	99	(9)
2014–2015	Fortuna Sittard	20	(2)
2015	NEC	14	(1)
2015–2017	Almere City	23	(0)
2017–	SV Spakenburg	42	(3)
2019–	→ DOVO (loan)	4	(2)
- * Club domestic league appearances and goals as of 15:25, 24 September 2019 (UTC)

Jasper Waalkens (born 13 February 1989 in Schijndel) is a Dutch footballer who plays as a winger for DOVO on loan from SV Spakenburg in the Dutch Tweede Divisie.

== Career ==
Waalkens started his career with Avanti'31. At young age he was scouted by both FC Den Bosch and Willem II. Because of the commuting distance he made the choice for FC Den Bosch. A few years later Willem II was interested again to sign him. This time he made the choice for the PSV Eindhoven youth academy. In his first under-19 year he won the prize for the best player in the competition.

Although PSV wanted to give him a chance in the reserve squad, Waalkens signed a two-year deal (with option) with Willem II. August 9, 2009 he made his professional debut in the awaymatch against FC Utrecht (1–0 loss).

In the summer 2017, Waalkens joined SV Spakenburg. He was loaned out to DOVO for the 2019–20 season.

== Honours ==
=== Club ===
NEC

- Eerste Divisie (1): 2014–15
