= Philipp Haastrup =

German footballer

Personal information
- Date of birth: 5 March 1982 (age 44)
- Place of birth: Münster, West Germany
- Height: 1.81 m (5 ft 11 in)
- Position: Defender

Senior career*
Years	Team	Apps	(Gls)
2001–2003	VfL Osnabrück	7	(0)
2003–2005	Rot-Weiss Essen	36	(0)
2005–2006	1. FC Saarbrücken	23	(0)
2006–2010	MVV Maastricht	116	(5)
2010–2012	Helmond Sport	63	(7)
2012–2013	Willem II	31	(1)
2013–2016	BFC Dynamo	71	(1)
2016	Tennis Borussia Berlin	11	(0)
Total		358	(14)
- * Club domestic league appearances and goals

Philipp Haastrup (born 5 March 1982) is a German former professional footballer who played as a defender.

== Career ==
Born in Münster, West Germany, Haastrup played professional club football in Germany and the Netherlands for VfL Osnabrück, Rot-Weiss Essen, 1. FC Saarbrücken, MVV Maastricht, Helmond Sport and Willem II. On 14 June 2013, he announced his retirement from professional league football, returning to Germany to sign for BFC Dynamo.

In his first season with BFC the club secured promotion to Regionalliga and extended his contract throughout the 2014–15 Regionalliga season.

In the summer of 2016, he joined Tennis Borussia Berlin, but left during the winter break.
