= TOP Oss =

Dutch association football club

- Full name: Tot Ons Plezier Oss
- Nickname: TOP
- Founded: 9 April 1928; 98 years ago
- Ground: Frans Heesen Stadion
- Capacity: 4,561
- Chairman: Joep Kemkens
- Manager: Sjors Ultee
- League: Eerste Divisie
- 2025–26: Eerste Divisie, 16th of 20
- Website: toposs.nl
Home colours	Away colours

TOP Oss (Dutch pronunciation: [ˈtɔp ɔs]), is a professional association football club based in the town of Oss, North Brabant, Netherlands, that competes in the Eerste Divisie, the second tier of the Dutch football league system. Founded in 1928 as T.O.P., a Dutch abbreviation for Tot Ons Plezier (English translation: To our pleasure), the team plays its home matches at the Frans Heesen Stadion, where it has been based since 1946.

The club's history includes numerous promotions and relegations, and some spells of sustained success. It has perhaps been most prominent since the early 1990s, where the club established itself in the second-tier of Dutch football. TOP Oss have a rivalry with nearby club FC Den Bosch.

== History ==
=== Early years (1928–1939) ===
According to sources, Toon Steinhauser and the brothers Piet and Cor van Schijndel always played football in Oss on Jurgensplein, a central square, after school. On 9 April 1928, they decided to found a club named Klein Maar Dapper (K.M.D.; English: "Small But Brave"), but when it turned out that more clubs had that name, the choice fell on T.O.P. ("To Our Pleasure"). On 7 May 1930, T.O.P. played its first competition match, on a field on the Molenstraat, behind Hotel van Welten and next to the local cinema. The pitch was a bare, uneven surface, covered with sand with an occasional tuft of grass. During home games, the goal posts were picked up from bakery Toontje van Bergen, then located in the Nieuwe Brouwerstraat. T.O.P. had two teams in the 1930–31 season both competing in the local division 1e Klas Maasbuurt. The first team reached promotion to the Derde Klasse of the Royal Dutch Football Association (KNVB), where it remained for the coming years.

T.O.P. won its first title in 1939, in the Derde Klasse E. Thereby, the club qualified for playoffs to promotion to the Tweede Klasse, where they had to face SV Nevelo from Oisterwijk and Hero from Breda. Both teams had already qualified and promotion became a fact.

=== The dark 1940s ===
With World War II looming, the Dutch army seized the then home ground of T.O.P., Gemeentelijk Sportpark Oss, in September 1939. At the end of August 1939, the threat of war in Europe became ever greater and on 28 August, the Dutch government announced the general mobilisation of army and fleet. Because many footballers between the ages of 20 and 35 were also mobilised and train connections were disrupted, the KNVB decided to postpone the competition matches scheduled for 3 and 10 September. The KNVB took the decision on 9 September 1939 to establish a Noodcompetitie ("Emergency Competition") to replace the regular competition. In the Noodcompetitie, teams were classified by geography rather than strength, there was no promotion and relegation, and no protests over referees' decisions could be filed. The season started on 24 September, a week later than the regular season had been planned to start. T.O.P. was in the Tweede Klasse B, where they, among others, played SC Helmondia, VVV and RKVV Wilhelmina. The competition ended after only few games when the German army invaded the Netherlands on 10 May 1940. The competition came to a standstill for several weeks, but was resumed at the end of May. Daily life was, however, disrupted, but under pressure from the German occupying forces, life had to appear as 'normal' as possible.

After state of emergency was declared in the Netherlands by the German occupiers on Dolle Dinsdag on 5 September 1944, the KNVB decided to stop all competitions. The years 1940–45 also marked a tragic period for T.O.P., as two of their players, Pince van der Aa and Hugo Brinkman, were permanently disabled during acts of war.

An ambiguous situation emerged in the Netherlands in September 1944, as the southern provinces were liberated, including Oss on 27 September 1944. While the rest of the country was still at war, allied soldiers played a benefit match on 14 October 1944 against a combined association football team from Oss. The site of the memorable match is the Gemeentelijk Sportpark Oss on the Berghemseweg, which had been seized by German soldiers as part of the occupation in 1939. The Royal Air Force team consisted of: Spencer (goalkeeper), Dauber, Spiking, Percival, Waddell, Shepherd, Martin, Levy, Phillips, Conve and Taylor. The proceeds of the competition were approximately ƒ 3,300 and which went to war victims from Oss.

Another war became the centre of attention after the liberation in 1945. On 28 September 1947, T.O.P. play a benefit against the team "De rest van Oss" with the final result 2–2. The proceeds went to Dutch soldiers in the Dutch East Indies. The match was organized by the organisation Nederland-Indië en Katholiek Thuisfront M.O.O. Oss.

=== Winning the Tweede Klasse (1949–1953) ===
For many years, T.O.P. played at the top of the Tweede Klasse, competing for the championship. Spirits were therefore high in 1949, when the title was finally won in the Tweede Klasse A. The decisive match was played on 30 January 1949, where T.O.P. played a home match on the Heescheweg against its biggest rivals at the time, VV DESK from Kaatsheuvel. In front of a sold-out stadium, with an average of 2,500 spectators during that season, the T.O.P. team lived up to its high expectations and beat DESK 2–0 to secure the title. Head coach Janus Spijkers was, however, unable to repeat the feat in the play-offs for promotion that followed. The Tweede Klasse A championship did not result in promotion to the Eerste Klasse.

=== First years of professionalism (1954–1957) ===
In the 1950s, TOP finished most seasons in the top half of the table. The board had a positive outlook on the future, and when the KNVB started to choose clubs for a professional football competition, club management applied for a professional license as they did not want to lag begind other football clubs in the Brabant province. Therefore, as of the 1955–56 season, TOP took part in the professional competitions of the KNVB. In its first year as a semi-professional club, TOP competed in the Eerste Klasse C (first division). The stadium on the Heescheweg had uncovered stands with mostly terracing. Professional football in the Netherlands was randomly divided into four first divisions with about 80 clubs. In the debut 1955–56 season, TOP managed to win five out of thirty games, while they drew five and lost twenty, hauling in only fifteen points. VV Zwartemeer, however, did even worse and TOP ended in the penultimate spot. TOP suffered relegation in its first season in the new league, alongside UVS from Leiden and DHC from Delft. Despite local interest in the first season, with more than 5,000 spectators in average, the transition to professionalism was not an initial success.

Ahead of the 1956–57 season, KNVB competitions were divided into the one top-tier Eredivisie, one second-tier Eerste Divisie and two third-tier Tweede Divisie. TOP compete the 1956–57 season in the Tweede Divisie B group. Once again, the club had to fight a relegation battle, and only managed to win three out of 28 matches against VV ONA from Gouda, VV De Valk from Valkenswaard and NEC Nijmegen. TOP would draw the short straw, and finish last in the group, with a goal difference of 42–90. After two inglorious seasons of professionalism, the club finally decided voluntarily to return to the Tweede Klasse of amateur football. Thereby, TOP became the first of the initial eighty professional clubs to return its license to the KNVB. Jan Huinink, who was the centre-back of the team in the semi-professional years, later stated: "It was not easy. TOP was a small club that had great difficulty in finding sponsors. In fact, this is still the case today."

=== Return to professionalism (1991–1999) ===
After decades of amateurism, ideas of a return to professionalism began brooding in Oss in the early 1990s. Market research showed, that there was sufficient public support for a professional setup. The KNVB also supported the transition to the professional Eerste Divisie because all conditions, both sporting and financial, could be met. The board was able to convince the club members that TOP wanted to make the step forward to professional football – again – and on a general assembly a vote confirmed TOP as a professional club once again.

The club's official return to professionalism dates to 17 August 1991, where TOP played its first match away against SC Heerenveen. Piet Schrijvers was the first-team coach, and Peter Wubben entered the historical annals by scoring the first goal for the club in its return to league football. Under head coaches Schrijvers (1992–93), Hans Dorjee (1994–95) en Lex Schoenmaker (1997–98), TOP finished in the top half of the Eerste Divisie table. The club would go under the name "TOP" until 1994, when it was renamed TOP Oss to more clearly reflect its city of origin.

=== Ups and downs in the Eerste Divisie (2000–2010) ===
The first decade of the new millennium is marked by varying successes. The first season with Wim van Zwam at the helm ended in a respectable 10th-place finish. Stefan Jansen crowned himself as top goalscorer of the 2000–01 Eerste Divisie with 30 goals to his name. The following season evolves in dramatic fashion, as TOP Oss concede 100 goals and finish bottom of the table, and a major cleanup of the squad ensues. However, due to there being no relegation from the second-tier at the time, TOP Oss suffer no consequences of the embarrassing season. Harry van den Ham took over as the new head coach afterwards, and led the team to ninth place in the league table.

The glory years only really kick off as Hans de Koning is appointed as the clubs's new head coach in 2005. The former goalkeeper leads TOP Oss to two period titles and the team qualifies for Nacompetitie (promotion play-offs) three times in five years. De Koning forged a successful team based on local talents from Oss, such as Bart van Hintum, Erik Quekel, Tony de Groot and Regilio Jacobs. In the club's 25th anniversary of professional football, fans voted De Koning as TOP Oss' Best Coach since 1991.

In the summer of 2009, the club was renamed FC Oss in order to separate the professional branch of the club from its amateur section. Ten months later, the club experienced a historical low point. After an intense relegation battle with Telstar and Fortuna Sittard, FC Oss suffered relegation to the Topklasse by losing the final match 5–1 to MVV Maastricht. Thereby, they became the first club to relegate to the third level of Dutch football in more than forty years, after the KNVB had reformed the league structure to merge professional and amateur football leagues.

=== Third division champions and a record year (2011–present) ===
Following the disastrous relegation, Dirk Heesen is promoted from assistant to head coach and given the task of leading the club back to the Eerste Divisie. A strong 2010–11 season, with only one loss to JVC Cuijk (2–1), meant that the club won the 2010–11 Topklasse Sunday Group. In the decisive match, FC Oss beat Achilles'29 2–0 after goals from Jean Black and Geoffrey Galatà. Oss then lost the championship game for the entire Topklasse title against IJsselmeervogels from the Saturday Group 0–4 on aggregate. However, IJsselmeervogels had already decided to deny promotion due to financial reasons and a desire to continue as an amateur club, which meant that FC Oss had secured promotion prior to the championship game.

After the return to the Eerste Divisie, FC Oss alternate good seasons with bad season. Under head coach Dirk Heesen (2011–12) the team plays spectacular football, and score many goals. With Anton Janssen (2012–13) and Klaas Wels (2017–18) as head coaches, Oss compete for a place in the post-season play-offs for large parts of the season, but miss out in the end. With Wil Boessen at the helm, however, the team managed to qualify for promotion play-offs, because on 27 February 2015, they win the third period title. With key players such as Kevin van Veen, Johnatan Opoku, Luuk Koopmans, Justin Mathieu and Ryan Sanusi, Oss finishes the season in ninth place.

In November 2017, it was announced that the club would be renamed TOP Oss for the 2018–19 season. The season would also prove to become the best historical season in club history. Many club records were broken in the 2018–19 season. TOP Oss never finished as high in the league table (6th); never had the finished with as many points (62); and never had the team won as many games (18). Under head coach Wels, the TOP Oss team were, however, eliminated in the second round of the promotion play-offs by Sparta Rotterdam (5–0 on aggregate). The following season (2019–20 season) was unstable. In the KNVB Cup, the Round of 16 was reached via, among others, a local derby against third Derde Divisie side Oss '20. In the round of 16, AZ was the opponent at home in the Frans Heesen Stadion. In the league, results were mixed. However, the season was cut short due to the measures taken to combat the COVID-19 outbreak. TOP Oss finished in a creditable 10th place in the Eerste Divisie in the 2020–21 season. In the spring of 2021, the club announced that the expiring contract of head coach Wels would not be extended. He was succeeded by Belgian manager Bob Peeters, manager of Westerlo. In addition, Ruben Roosken and Philippe Rommens both moved to Eredivisie clubs. After a disappointing season, Peeters was dismissed and Kristof Aelbrecht was brought in as his replacement.

== Honours ==
- Topklasse
  - Sunday Champions (1): 2010–11
  - Runners-up (1): 2010–11

== Club staff ==
Position	Name
Manager	(Netherlands) Sjors Ultee
Assistant managers	(Netherlands) Hans van de Haar (Netherlands) Jord Roos (Netherlands) Nick Lim
Goalkeeper coach	(Netherlands) Siem Nijssen
Team manager	(Netherlands) Foeke Komans

== Managers ==
- (Netherlands) Piet Schrijvers (1991–93)
- (Netherlands) Bram Braam (1993–94)
- (Netherlands) Hans Dorjee (1994–95)
- (Netherlands) Adrie Koster (1995–97)
- (Netherlands) Lex Schoenmaker (1997–00)
- (Netherlands) Jan Versleijen (1999–00)
- (Netherlands) Wim van Zwam (2000–02)
- (Netherlands) Harry van den Ham (2002–05)
- (Netherlands) Hans de Koning (2005–10)
- (Netherlands) Dirk Heesen (2010–12)
- (Netherlands) Anton Janssen (2012–13)
- (Netherlands) Gert Aandewiel (2013–14)
- (Netherlands) Wil Boessen (2014–15)
- (Netherlands) Reinier Robbemond (2015–16)
- (Netherlands) François Gesthuizen (2016–17)
- (Netherlands) Klaas Wels (2017–21, 2023)
- (Belgium) Bob Peeters (2021–22)
- (Belgium) Kristof Aelbrecht (2022)
- (Netherlands) Ruud Brood (2023–24)
- (Netherlands) Sjors Ultee (2024–present)

== Domestic results ==
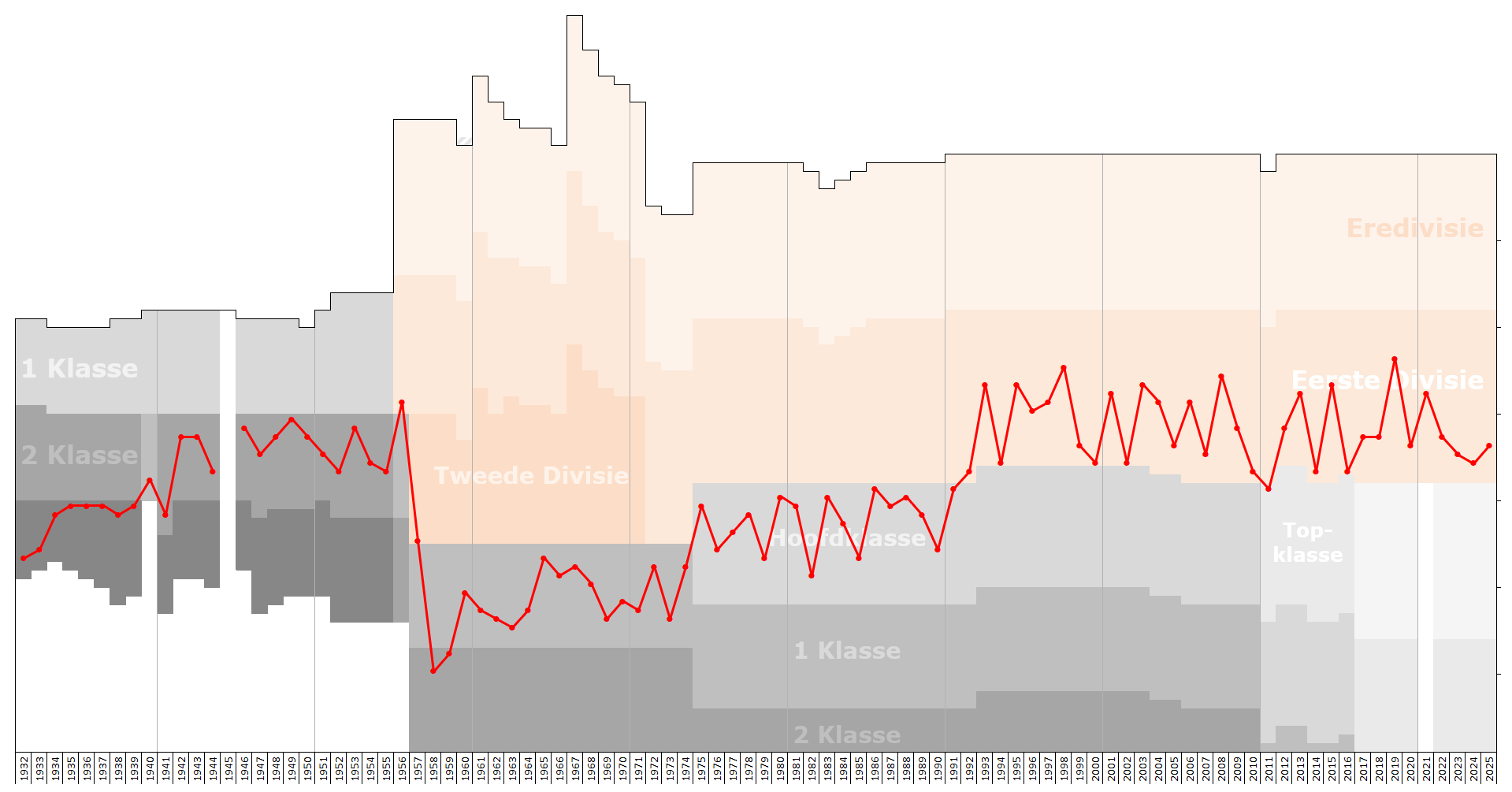
Historical chart of league performance

Below is a table with TOP's domestic results since the introduction of professional football in 1956.

Domestic Results since 1956
Domestic league	League result	Qualification to	KNVB Cup season	Cup result
2025–26 Eerste Divisie	16th	–	2025–26	first round
2024–25 Eerste Divisie	16th	–	2024–25	first round
2023–24 Eerste Divisie	18th	–	2023–24	first round
2022–23 Eerste Divisie	17th	–	2022–23	first round
2021–22 Eerste Divisie	15th	–	2021–22	first round
2020–21 Eerste Divisie	10th	–	2020–21	first round
2019–20 Eerste Divisie^{(C)}	16th	–	2019–20	round of 16
2018–19 Eerste Divisie	6th	promotion/relegation play-off: no promotion	2018–19	second round
2017–18 Eerste Divisie	15th	–	2017–18	first round
2016–17 Eerste Divisie	15th	–	2016–17	first round
2015–16 Eerste Divisie	19th	–	2015–16	second round
2014–15 Eerste Divisie	9th	promotion/relegation play-off: no promotion	2014–15	second round
2013–14 Eerste Divisie	19th	–	2013–14	first round
2012–13 Eerste Divisie	10th	–	2012–13	second round
2011–12 Eerste Divisie	14th	–	2011–12	round of 16
2010–11 Topklasse	1st	Eerste Divisie (promotion)	2010–11	third round
2009–10 Eerste Divisie	19th	Topklasse (relegation)	2009–10	second round
2008–09 Eerste Divisie	14th	promotion/relegation play-off: no promotion	2008–09	second round
2007–08 Eerste Divisie	8th	promotion/relegation play-off: no promotion	2007–08	second round
2006–07 Eerste Divisie	17th	–	2006–07	second round
2005–06 Eerste Divisie	11th	promotion/relegation play-off: no promotion	2005–06	second round
2004–05 Eerste Divisie	16th	–	2004–05	quarter final
2003–04 Eerste Divisie	11th	–	2003–04	first round
2002–03 Eerste Divisie	9th	–	2002–03	second round
2001–02 Eerste Divisie	18th	–	2001–02	group stage
2000–01 Eerste Divisie	10th	–	2000–01	third round
1999–2000 Eerste Divisie	18th	–	1999–00	group stage
1998–99 Eerste Divisie	16th	–	1998–99	group stage
1997–98 Eerste Divisie	7th	–	1997–98	second round
1996–97 Eerste Divisie	11th	–	1996–97	second round
1995–96 Eerste Divisie	12th	–	1995–96	second round
1994–95 Eerste Divisie	9th	–	1994–95	group stage
1993–94 Eerste Divisie	18th	–	1993–94	second round
1992–93 Eerste Divisie	9th	–	1992–93	fourth round
1991–92 Eerste Divisie	19th	–	1991–92	fourth round
1957-91	Not active in professional football		1957–91	–
1956–57 Tweede Divisie	15th (group B)	Voluntary relegation to amateur leagues	1956–57	Second round

== Current squad ==
As of 19 September 2026

Note: Flags indicate national team as defined under FIFA eligibility rules; some limited exceptions apply. Players may hold more than one non-FIFA nationality.

No.	Pos.	Nation	Player
1	GK	NED	Mike Havekotte (captain)
2	DF	SMA	Ilounga Pata
3	DF	NED	Leonel Miguel
4	DF	NED	Quint Jansen
5	MF	NED	Jafar Bynoe
6	MF	BEL	Milo Horemans
8	MF	NED	Marcelencio Esajas
9	FW	NED	Andy Visser
10	MF	NED	Richard van der Venne
11	MF	NED	Justin Mathieu
12	DF	NED	Alvaro Henry
14	DF	NED	Maxim Mariani
16	GK	NED	Devin Remie
17	FW	IDN	Mauresmo Hinoke

No.	Pos.	Nation	Player
18	FW	NED	Kyanno Silva
19	FW	NED	Franslyn Nsingi
21	DF	NED	Thomas Cox
22	FW	TUR	Mert Erkan
23	DF	NED	Delano Vianello
24	DF	NED	Jay Kuiper
25	FW	NED	Jacey Pansa
26	DF	NED	Julian Kuijpers
27	FW	NED	Maurilio de Lannoy
28	MF	NED	Lars Mol
30	GK	NED	Sven Jansen
33	DF	NED	Lars Zonneveld
99	FW	MLI	Siriné Doucouré
