= Shayron Curiel =

Dutch footballer

Personal information
- Date of birth: 17 April 1991 (age 35)
- Place of birth: Willemstad, Curacao
- Position: Striker

Youth career
- 2002-2008: Spartaan '20
- 2008–2010: Sparta

Senior career*
Years	Team	Apps	(Gls)
2010	Sparta	1	(0)
2011–2012	Dordrecht	32	(5)
2015	Alexandria '66		
2015–2016	Dordrecht	11	(1)
2016–2017	Alexandria '66		
2017–2018	VV Nieuwerkerk		
2018–2021	Spartaan '20		
2021–2022	Zwaluwen V.		
- * Club domestic league appearances and goals as of 20 May 2017

Shayron Curiel (born 17 April 1991 in Willemstad, Curacao) is a Dutch footballer who played professionally for Eerste Divisie clubs Sparta Rotterdam and FC Dordrecht during the 2010-2012 football seasons. He currently plays in the amateur leagues.

== Club career ==
Curiel played in the Sparta Rotterdam academy and made his professional debut against FC Den Bosch in October 2010. Next season he moved to FC Dordrecht before a jail sentence cut his career short. He was given a second chance at Dordrecht in summer 2015 after joining them from amateur side Alexandria '66, but was released in January 2016 due to ill discipline.

He then moved into amateur football, where he played again for Alexandria '66 before joining Nieuwerkerk for the 2017/18 season. He later played for Zwaluwen Vlaardingen, Zwarte Pijl and again for Nieuwerkerk and Spartaan '20.

=== Jail sentence ===
In 2012 Curiel took part in an armed robbery on students in Rotterdam. He spent two years in jail after being recognized on CCTV.
