= Wesley de Ruiter =

Dutch footballer

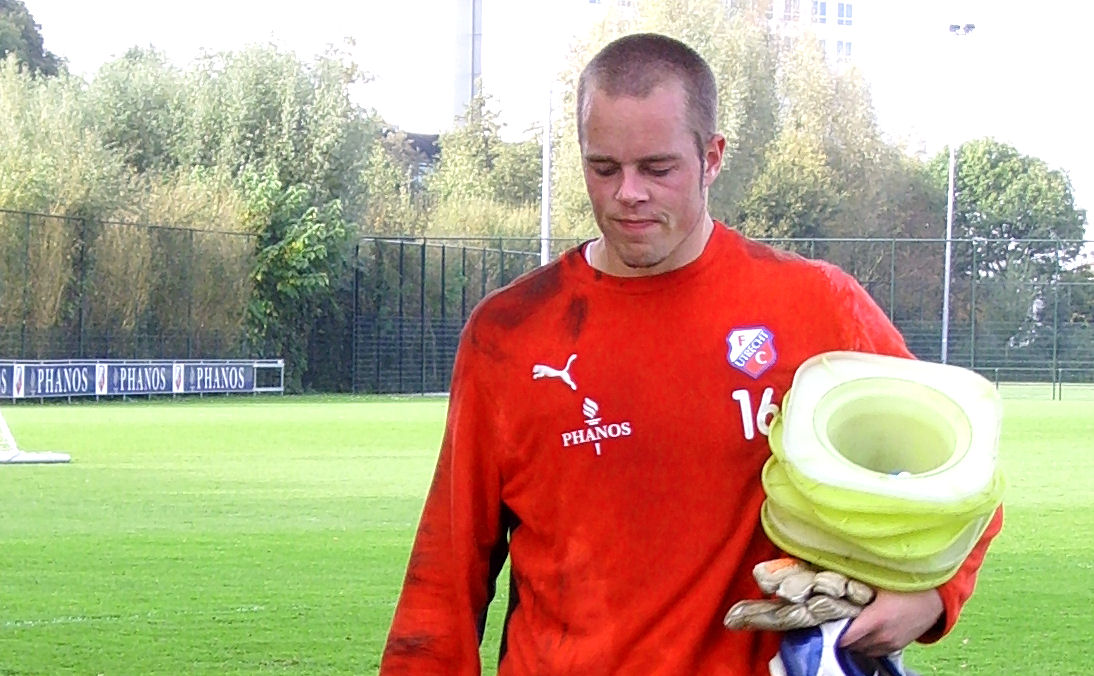

Personal information
- Date of birth: 13 January 1986 (age 40)
- Place of birth: Leiden, Netherlands
- Height: 1.92 m (6 ft 3 1/2 in)
- Position: Goalkeeper

Senior career*
Years	Team	Apps	(Gls)
2007–2011	FC Utrecht	20	(0)
2011	→ FC Den Bosch (loan)	12	(0)
2011–2013	Excelsior	34	(0)
2013–2014	FC Den Bosch	23	(0)
2014–2015	RKC Waalwijk	0	(0)
2015	FC Emmen	2	(0)
- * Club domestic league appearances and goals as of 10 May 2015 (UTC)

Wesley de Ruiter (born 13 January 1986) is a Dutch professional footballer who plays as a goalkeeper.

== Career ==
Born in Leiden, de Ruiter has played for FC Utrecht, FC Den Bosch, Excelsior, RKC Waalwijk and FC Emmen.
