= Randy Rustenberg =

Dutch footballer (born 1984)

Personal information
- Date of birth: 4 February 1984 (age 42)
- Place of birth: Amsterdam, Netherlands
- Height: 1.76 m (5 ft 9 1/2 in)
- Position: Defender

Senior career*
Years	Team	Apps	(Gls)
2004–2006	RKC Waalwijk	13	(0)
2006–2008	FC Dordrecht	28	(0)
2008–2011	SC Cambuur	52	(0)
2011	AGOVV Apeldoorn	12	(0)
2011	FC Emmen	0	(0)
2011–2012	Pattaya United		
2012	FC Emmen	0	(0)
- * Club domestic league appearances and goals as of 5 November 2012

Randy Rustenberg (born 4 February 1984) is a Dutch professional footballer who plays as a defender.

== Career ==
Born in Amsterdam, Rustenberg has played for RKC Waalwijk, FC Dordrecht, SC Cambuur, AGOVV Apeldoorn, FC Emmen and Pattaya United.
