= Jelle De Bock =

Belgian footballer

Personal information
- Date of birth: 4 May 1988 (age 38)
- Place of birth: Sint-Niklaas, Belgium
- Height: 1.86 m (6 ft 1 in)
- Position: Centre back

Youth career
- Eendracht Aalst
- Hamme
- Club Brugge

Senior career*
Years	Team	Apps	(Gls)
2006–2009	PSV	0	(0)
2006–2007	→ Red Star Waasland (loan)	15	(0)
2007–2008	→ Eindhoven (loan)	21	(0)
2008–2009	→ Helmond Sport (loan)	17	(1)
2009–2012	Eindhoven	47	(1)
2012–2014	Den Bosch	34	(1)
Total		134	(3)

International career
2003–2004	Belgium U16	13	(0)
2004–2005	Belgium U17	8	(1)
2005–2006	Belgium U18	12	(0)
2006	Belgium U19	7	(0)
2011	Belgium U21	5	(0)
- * Club domestic league appearances and goals

Jelle De Bock (born 4 May 1988) is a Belgian former professional footballer who played as a centre back.

== Career ==
De Bock was born in Sint-Niklaas, East Flanders. In March 2006, he moved from Club Brugge to PSV. He was mainly loaned out during the following years, and never made an official appearance for PSV. He has represented several national youth teams of Belgium. After having played for FC Eindhoven for some years, De Bock signed a two-year contract with Den Bosch on 14 June 2012.

In June 2014, De Bock went on trial with Azerbaijan Premier League side Inter Baku.

After retiring from professional football, he obtained a degree in sports marketing from Vrije Universiteit Brussel and has worked as a sports marketeer for Triple Double sport marketing in Eindhoven since 2015.
