= Nick Coster =

Dutch footballer

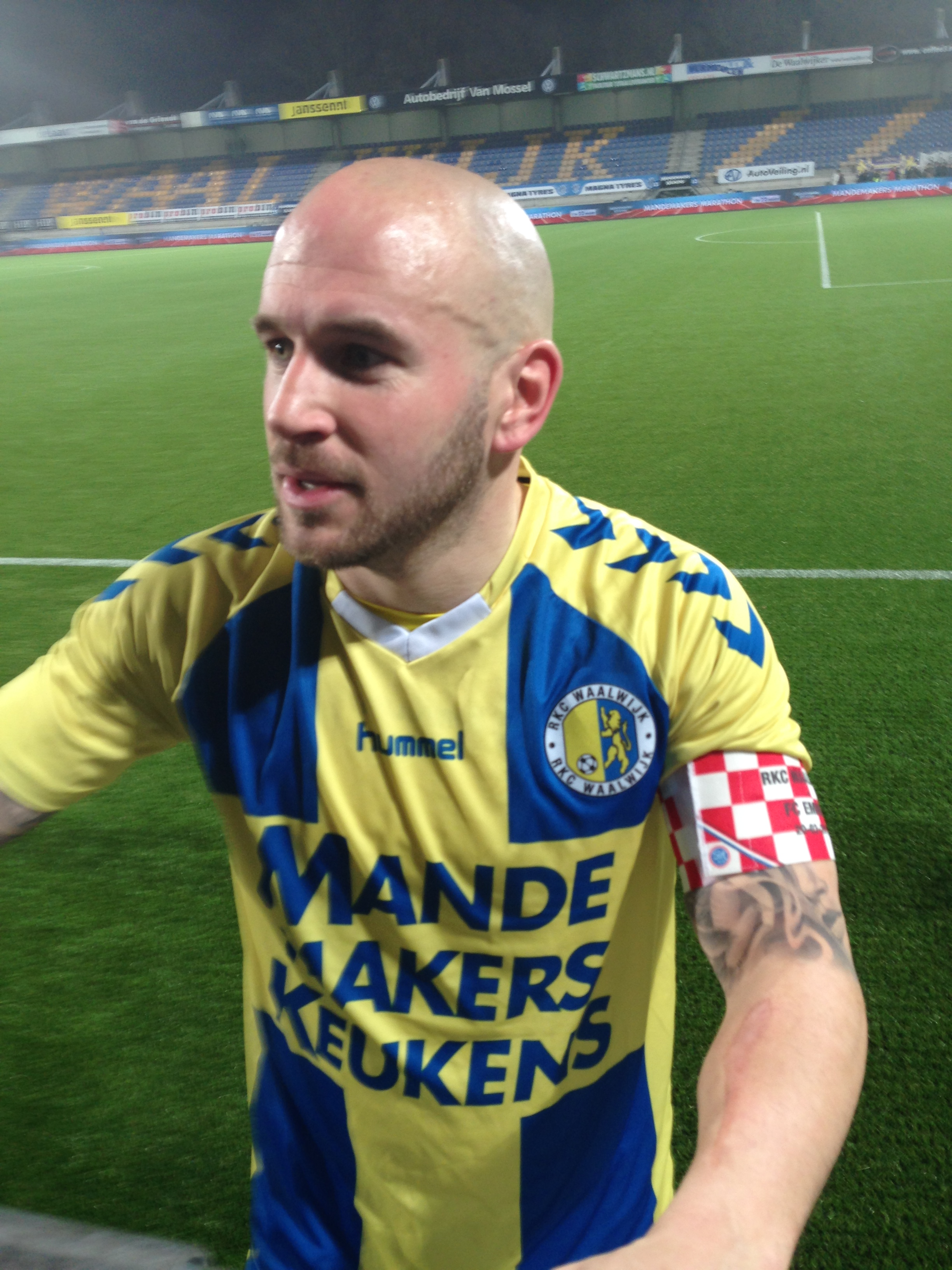

Personal information
- Full name: Nick Coster
- Date of birth: 24 September 1985 (age 41)
- Place of birth: Alphen aan den Rijn, Netherlands
- Height: 1.69 m (5 ft 7 in)
- Positions: Left back; midfielder

Youth career
- Alphense Boys
- ADO Den Haag

Senior career*
| Years | Team | Apps | (Gls) |
| 2007–2008 | ADO Den Haag | 11 | (0) |
| 2008–2012 | Dordrecht | 117 | (6) |
| 2012–2014 | Volendam | 65 | (1) |
| 2014–2016 | RKC | 56 | (2) |
| 2016–2018 | DOVO | | |
| Total | | 249 | (9) |
- * Club domestic league appearances and goals as of 7 June 2018

Nick Coster (born 24 September 1985) is a Dutch retired footballer. He last played professionally as a left back for RKC Waalwijk in the Dutch Eerste Divisie, whom he had joined in 2014.

== Club career ==
A hard-working leftsided defender or midfielder, he formerly played for ADO Den Haag, FC Dordrecht and FC Volendam. He was released by RKC in summer 2016 and joined amateurs DOVO.

In 2018, he left DOVO and retired from football.
