= Randel Shakison =

Dutch footballer (born 1990)

Personal information
- Full name: Randel Shakison
- Date of birth: 28 February 1990 (age 36)
- Place of birth: Amsterdam, Netherlands
- Height: 1.88 m (6 ft 2 in)
- Position: Left back

Team information
- Current team: AFC
- Number: 21

Youth career
- Ajax

Senior career*
Years	Team	Apps	(Gls)
2010–2012	Fortuna Sittard	22	(1)
2012–2013	FC Emmen	0	(0)
2013–	AFC	52	(1)
- * Club domestic league appearances and goals as of 28 March 2016 (UTC)

Randel Shakison (born 28 February, 1990) is a Dutch footballer in Amsterdam, Netherlands who currently plays for AFC in the Topklasse. Shakison made his Eerste Divisie league debut at Fortuna Sittard during the 2010–2011 season.
