= Vlatko Lazić =

Dutch footballer (born 1989)

Personal information
- Date of birth: 1 May 1989 (age 37)
- Place of birth: Bodegraven, Netherlands
- Position: Left back

Team information
- Current team: Jodan Boys
- Number: 15

Youth career
- Ajax

Senior career*
Years	Team	Apps	(Gls)
2010–2011	Dordrecht	5	(0)
2011	RBC Roosendaal	6	(0)
2011–2012	KV Turnhout	15	(1)
2012–2015	De Graafschap	87	(6)
2015–2016	NAC Breda	24	(0)
2016	Astra Giurgiu	1	(0)
2016–2017	RKC Waalwijk	15	(1)
2017	Arendal	11	(1)
2018	Quick Boys	11	(0)
2018	GVVV	1	(0)
2019	FC Lienden	5	(0)
2019–2020	DHSC	18	(1)
2020–2024	Jodan Boys	51	(3)
Total		250	(13)
- * Club domestic league appearances and goals as of 11 February 2019

Vlatko Lazić (born 1 May 1989) is a Dutch professional footballer who plays for as a left back for Jodan Boys.

== Personal life ==
Lazić was born in Bodegraven. He is of Serbian descent.

== Career ==
Lazić has played for Ajax, Dordrecht, RBC Roosendaal, KV Turnhout and De Graafschap. He signed for NAC Breda in July 2015.

In March 2019 it was confirmed, that Lazić would join DHSC from the upcoming 2019–20 season. At the end of February 2020 it was confirmed, that Lazic would join Jodan Boys in July 2020.
