= 2010–11 Topklasse =

1st season of the third-tier football league in the Netherlands

Topklasse
- Season: 2010–11

The 2010–11 Topklasse season was the first and inaugural edition of the newly created Dutch third tier. A total 32 teams competed in the league, one of them coming from the fully professional 2009–10 Eerste Divisie, and the remaining 31 from the amateur 2009–10 Hoofdklasse. The competition was split into two leagues, a "Saturday" and a "Sunday" one, who differ by the day the related games are usually played.

The league was originally expected to feature two relegations from Eerste Divisie; this was however made impossible by the exclusion of bankrupt-collapsed HFC Haarlem from professional football in January 2010. HFC Haarlem's place will be taken by another Hoofdklasse team which will be decided by play-offs between the losers of the initial play-off games in the Hoofdklasse. The only relegated team from Eerste Divisie, last-placed FC Oss, could however keep their place in the second tier, following the financial collapse of BV Veendam in May 2010; such event did not occur in the end, after it was confirmed that Veendam had won their appeal against bankruptcy in court later on June.

The league was originally announced to receive national weekly media coverage on Dutch TV channel RTL 7, with a one-hour synthesis of the games on Saturdays and Sundays.

After 11 matches, Dijkse Boys voluntarily withdrew from the Sunday Topklasse due to financial troubles. The club will be relegated from the Topklasse.

Three clubs expressed interest in promotion, FC Oss from the Sunday league, and Rijnsburgse Boys and SV Spakenburg of the Saturday league. Ultimately, IJsselmeervogels were crowned Saturday league champions, whereas FC Oss won the Sunday league title; this meant that FC Oss were already promoted at the end of the regular season, since IJsselmeervogels opted not to apply for promotion to the Eerste Divisie instead.

== Teams ==
=== Saturday league ===
Location of teams in the Saturday Topklasse 2010-2011

Club	City	2009–10 season
ARC	Alphen aan den Rijn	6th in Hoofdklasse Saturday A
BVV Barendrecht	Barendrecht	1st in Hoofdklasse Saturday A
CSV Apeldoorn	Apeldoorn	3rd in Hoofdklasse Saturday C
Excelsior '31	Rijssen, Rijssen-Holten	1st in Hoofdklasse Saturday C
FC Lisse	Lisse	4th in Hoofdklasse Saturday A
Flevo Boys	Emmeloord, Noordoostpolder	4th in Hoofdklasse Saturday C
Harkemase Boys	Harkema, Achtkarspelen	2nd in Hoofdklasse Saturday C
HHC Hardenberg	Hardenberg	6th in Hoofdklasse Saturday C
HSV Hoek	Hoek, Terneuzen	4th in Hoofdklasse Saturday B
IJsselmeervogels	Spakenburg, Bunschoten	1st in Hoofdklasse Saturday B
Rijnsburgse Boys	Rijnsburg	3rd in Hoofdklasse Saturday A
SC Genemuiden	Genemuiden	5th in Hoofdklasse Saturday C
Sparta Nijkerk	Nijkerk	2nd in Hoofdklasse Saturday B
SV Spakenburg	Spakenburg, Bunschoten	3rd in Hoofdklasse Saturday B
vv Capelle	Capelle aan den IJssel	2nd in Hoofdklasse Saturday A
VV Katwijk	Katwijk	5th in Hoofdklasse Saturday A

=== Sunday league ===
Location of teams in the Sunday Topklasse 2010-2011

Club	City	2009–10 season
Achilles '29	Groesbeek	4th in Hoofdklasse Sunday C
AFC	Amsterdam	1st in Hoofdklasse Sunday A
De Treffers	Groesbeek	1st in Hoofdklasse Sunday C
Dijkse Boys	Helmond	5th in Hoofdklasse Sunday B
EVV	Echt, Echt-Susteren	3rd in Hoofdklasse Sunday B
FC Hilversum	Hilversum	3rd in Hoofdklasse Sunday A
FC Lienden	Lienden, Buren	2nd in Hoofdklasse Sunday C
FC Oss	Oss	19th in Eerste Divisie
Gemert	Gemert, Gemert-Bakel	1st in Hoofdklasse Sunday B
Haaglandia	Rijswijk	4th in Hoofdklasse Sunday A
HVV Hollandia	Hoorn	6th in Hoofdklasse Sunday A
JVC Cuijk	Cuijk	4th in Hoofdklasse Sunday B
Quick '20	Oldenzaal	3rd in Hoofdklasse Sunday C
SV Argon	Mijdrecht, De Ronde Venen	2nd in Hoofdklasse Sunday A
VV Baronie	Breda	2nd in Hoofdklasse Sunday B
VVSB	Noordwijkerhout	5th in Hoofdklasse Sunday A

== Composition of inaugural season ==
For the inaugural season of the Topklasse, 32 teams were picked, 31 of which coming from the Hoofdklasse, and one - FC Oss - being relegated from 2009–10 Eerste Divisie. Of the 31 teams from the Hoofdklasse, 24 were promoted automatically (the top four placed in the six round of the 2009–10 Hoofdklasse, whereas the remaining seven vacancies were filled through a playoff tournament.

=== Playoff promotions ===
A post-season playoff tournament was held between May and June 2010 in order to fill seven more vacancies for the season. Such tournament was divided into two phases: the first phase featured six two-legged games, whose winners would have been promoted into the Topklasse.

The six defeated teams from the first phase (three from Saturday Hoofdklasse, three from Sunday Hoofdklasse) then took part to a second phase, in which two rounds composed by three clubs each were organized: the two round winners will successively play against each other in a neutral field, one-legged final that will assign the remaining spot in the league.

==== From Saturday Hoofdklasse, first phase ====
- HHC Hardenberg (Hardenberg)
- SC Genemuiden (Genemuiden, Zwartewaterland)
- VV Katwijk (Katwijk)

==== From Sunday Hoofdklasse, first phase ====
- Dijkse Boys (Helmond)
- HVV Hollandia (Hoorn)
- VVSB (Noordwijkerhout)

==== From second phase ====
- ARC (Alphen aan den Rijn)

== League tables ==
=== Saturday league ===
Pos	Team	Pld	W	D	L	GF	GA	GD	Pts	Qualification or relegation
1	IJsselmeervogels (Q)	30	19	5	6	68	39	+29	62	Qualification for playoff finals
2	Spakenburg	30	18	6	6	83	41	+42	60	
3	Rijnsburgse Boys	30	14	9	7	69	46	+23	51	
4	Katwijk	30	14	7	9	47	38	+9	49	
5	Excelsior '31	30	12	9	9	48	45	+3	45	
6	Capelle	30	12	8	10	46	36	+10	44	
7	Genemuiden	30	13	4	13	51	63	−12	43	
8	HHC Hardenberg	30	12	6	12	48	37	+11	42	
9	Barendrecht	30	12	6	12	35	36	−1	42	
10	Harkemase Boys	30	12	5	13	53	52	+1	41	
11	Lisse	30	11	8	11	52	51	+1	41	
12	ARC	30	9	6	15	42	61	−19	33	
13	CSV Apeldoorn (R)	30	8	8	14	47	70	−23	32	Qualification for relegation playoffs
14	Flevo Boys (R)	30	7	8	15	40	68	−28	29	Relegation to 2011–12 Hoofdklasse
15	Sparta Nijkerk (R)	30	7	7	16	35	58	−23	28	Relegation to 2011–12 Hoofdklasse
16	Hoek (R)	30	6	6	18	27	50	−23	24	Relegation to 2011–12 Hoofdklasse

Updated to match(es) played on 14 May 2011. Source: Soccerway.com
Rules for classification: 1) points; 2) goal difference; 3) number of goals scored.
(Q) Qualified for the phase indicated; (R) Relegated

=== Sunday league ===
Pos	Team	Pld	W	D	L	GF	GA	GD	Pts	Qualification or relegation
1	Oss (P, Q)	28	16	11	1	49	23	+26	59	Qualification for playoff finals
2	Achilles '29	28	15	8	5	52	25	+27	53	
3	Argon	28	14	5	9	38	34	+4	47	
4	AFC	28	13	6	9	59	45	+14	45	
5	De Treffers	28	13	6	9	39	39	0	45	
6	JVC Cuijk	28	11	8	9	47	48	−1	41	
7	Haaglandia	28	11	7	10	58	43	+15	40	
8	Quick '20	28	11	6	11	46	43	+3	39	
9	EVV	28	10	7	11	36	34	+2	37	
10	Lienden	28	11	4	13	50	58	−8	37	
11	VVSB	28	9	5	14	34	48	−14	32	
12	Hollandia	28	7	10	11	26	34	−8	31	
13	Hilversum	28	7	10	11	30	43	−13	31	Qualification for relegation playoffs
14	Gemert (R)	28	6	7	15	24	43	−19	25	Relegation to 2011–12 Hoofdklasse
15	Baronie (R)	28	3	6	19	32	60	−28	15	Relegation to 2011–12 Hoofdklasse
16	Dijkse Boys (R)	0	0	0	0	0	0	0	0	Relegated after voluntary withdrawal from the Topklasse. All matches played have been annulled. (Note: On 11 November 2010, Dijkse Boys voluntarily withdrew from the Topklasse due to financial troubles. All matches played thus far have been annulled and the team will be relegated to the Hoofdklasse.)

Updated to match(es) played on 15 May 2011. Source: Soccerway.com
Rules for classification: 1) points; 2) goal difference; 3) number of goals scored.
(P) Promoted; (Q) Qualified for the phase indicated; (R) Relegated

=== Championship play-offs ===
Team 1	Agg.	Team 2	1st leg	2nd leg
FC Oss	0–4	IJsselmeervogels	0–2	0-2

IJsselmeervogels has won the overall Topklasse title, but didn't apply for promotion to the Eerste Divisie. FC Oss was therefore promoted instead.

=== Promotion/relegation play-offs ===
Team 1	Score	Team 2
VV Montfoort	1–0 (aet)	CSV Apeldoorn
FC Hilversum	0–3	WKE

Montfoort and WKE promoted to 2011–12 Topklasse. CSV Apeldoorn relegated to 2011–12 Hoofdklasse. FC Hilversum were originally relegated, but later readmitted due to RBC Roosendaal's disbandment and consequent readmission of Almere City FC into the Eerste Divisie.
