= Junior Livramento =

Portuguese footballer (born 1987)

Personal information
- Full name: Junior Fonseca do Livramento
- Date of birth: 12 December 1987 (age 38)
- Place of birth: Almada, Portugal
- Height: 1.82 m (6 ft 0 in)
- Positions: Left-back; midfielder

Youth career
- Sparta Rotterdam
- FC Dordrecht
- Willem II

Senior career*
Years	Team	Apps	(Gls)
2004–2005	FC Dordrecht	1	(0)
2009–2011	Willem II	19	(0)
2011	→ RBC Roosendaal (loan)	10	(1)
2011–2012	→ AGOVV (loan)	16	(1)
- * Club domestic league appearances and goals

Junior Fonseca do Livramento (born 12 December 1987) is a Portuguese former professional footballer who played as a left-back or midfielder.

== Career ==
Livramento's first professional appearance was as a 17-year-old in an Eerste Divisie match with Dordrecht. In 2006, he moved to Willem II to play in the reserve squad. In the summer of 2009 he got the chance to prove himself with the first team, because of the bad financial situation of the club. On 1 August 2009 he made his debut for Willem II, replacing Saïd Boutahar against Vitesse.
