= Diederik Bangma =

Dutch football goalkeeper

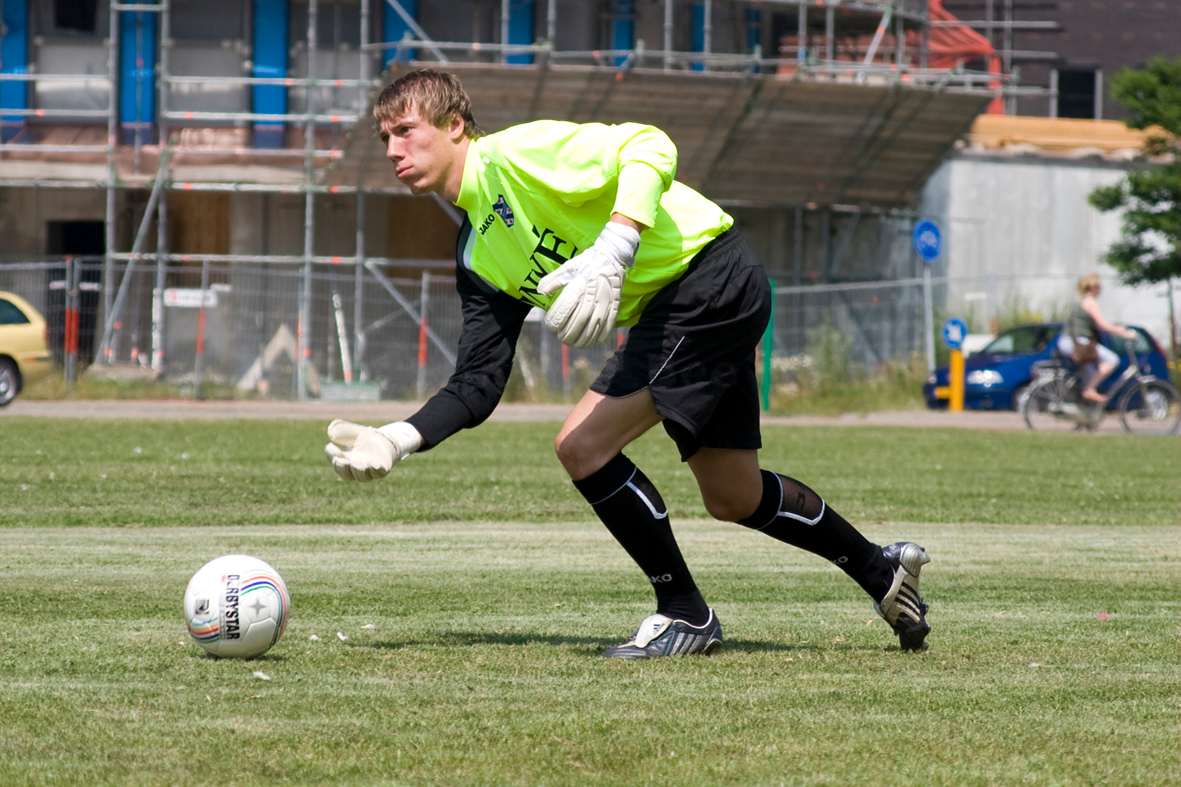
- Diederik Bangma (2009)

Personal information
- Full name: Diederik Bangma
- Date of birth: 22 May 1990 (age 36)
- Place of birth: Rhenen, Netherlands
- Height: 1.85 m (6 ft 1 in)
- Position: Goalkeeper

Youth career
- GVVV

Senior career*
Years	Team	Apps	(Gls)
2009–2011	Heerenveen	1	(0)
2011	→ Emmen (loan)	0	(0)
2011–2015	WKE	105	(0)
2015	Achilles 1894		
2016–2019	Cloppenburg	9	(0)

International career
2007-2008	Netherlands U-18	2	(0)
- * Club domestic league appearances and goals as of 18:08, 3 July 2010 (UTC)

Diederik Bangma (born 22 May 1990) is a Dutch football goalkeeper. Previously he played for Dutch top flight club SC Heerenveen and played for the Netherlands national under-18 football team.

== Club career ==
During his early years Bangma played at GVVV Veenendaal before being picked up by the youth academy of SC Heerenveen in 2004.

In June 2009 Bangma signed his first deal that would keep him at the Abe Lenstra Stadion until the summer of 2011. In the 2009/2010 season he was the fourth goalkeeper in the hierarchy. Due to injuries of Kenny Steppe, Brian Vandenbussche and Martin Lejsal he debuted on February 27, 2010, in the match against Heracles Almelo. This was his only appearance in the first squad, since the club signed veteran Henk Timmer for the rest of the season as first goalkeeper.

In the summer of 2011 Bangma joined amateur-club WKE on a free transfer, which played in the Topklasse, the third level in Dutch football. He moved to Achilles 1894 in 2015 only to join German Regionalliga Nord club Cloppenburg in February 2016.
