= Johan Versluis =

Dutch footballer

Personal information
- Full name: Johan Versluis
- Date of birth: 16 August 1983 (age 43)
- Place of birth: Dordrecht, Netherlands
- Height: 1.90 m (6 ft 3 in)
- Position: Defender

Youth career
- SSW
- Feyenoord
- Willem II

Senior career*
Years	Team	Apps	(Gls)
2005–2012	FC Dordrecht	163	(10)
- * Club domestic league appearances and goals as of 13 August 2012 (UTC)

Johan Versluis (born 16 August 1983) is a former Dutch professional footballer who played his whole career as a defender for FC Dordrecht in the Dutch Eerste Divisie.
