= Ruud van der Rijt =

Dutch footballer

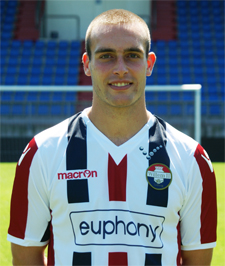

Personal information
- Date of birth: 17 November 1988 (age 37)
- Place of birth: Nijnsel, Netherlands
- Height: 1.81 m (5 ft 11 1/2 in)
- Position: Defender

Youth career
- VV Nijnsel
- Willem II

Senior career*
Years	Team	Apps	(Gls)
2006–2012	FC Eindhoven	123	(6)
2012–2013	Willem II	14	(0)
- * Club domestic league appearances and goals as of 4 August 2013 (UTC)

Ruud van der Rijt (born 17 November 1988 in Nijnsel) is a Dutch former professional footballer who played as a defender for FC Eindhoven and Willem II.
