= Robert van Boxel =

Dutch footballer

Personal information
- Full name: Robert van Boxel
- Date of birth: 20 January 1983 (age 43)
- Place of birth: Zwanenburg, Netherlands
- Height: 1.88 m (6 ft 2 in)
- Position: Centre back

Youth career
- RKVV NAS
- Haarlem
- PSV

Senior career*
Years	Team	Apps	(Gls)
2003	PSV	1	(0)
2003–2004	ADO Den Haag	12	(0)
2004–2006	AGOVV	54	(4)
2006–2009	MVV	80	(15)
2009–2012	Cambuur	73	(3)
2012–2015	Sparta	36	(2)
2013–2014	→ Cambuur (loan)	7	(0)
2015–2018	FC Lisse	27	(1)

International career
2003-2004	Netherlands U21	2	(0)
- * Club domestic league appearances and goals as of 10 May 2015 (UTC)

Robert van Boxel (born 20 January 1983 in Zwanenburg) is a Dutch retired footballer who played as a centre back.

== Club career ==
He spent a few seasons in the PSV youth academy and played for ADO Den Haag, AGOVV Apeldoorn, SC Cambuur, MVV and Sparta Rotterdam, who loaned him back to Cambuur in 2013. He joined amateur side FC Lisse in summer 2015 from Sparta and returned to boyhood club Zwanenburg in 2018. After a year he became their head coach and later worked at Lisse as academy manager.

== International career ==
Van Boxel played 2 games for the Netherlands national under-21 football team.

== Personal life ==
While playing for Lisse, van Boxel studied entrepreneurship and worked for a mobile telephone and internet service provider.
