= Marco Parnela =

Finnish footballer (born 1981)

Personal information
- Date of birth: 5 January 1981 (age 45)
- Place of birth: Orivesi, Finland
- Position: Defender

Senior career*
Years	Team	Apps	(Gls)
- Atletico Catania
- ESV München
2001–2003	Thun	33	(1)
2003–2004	Zwolle	8	(0)
2004–2010	Go Ahead Eagles	162	(14)
Total		203	(15)
- * Club domestic league appearances and goals

Marco Parnela (born 5 January 1981) is a Finnish former professional footballer who played as a defender. Active in both Switzerland and the Netherlands, Parnela made over 200 career league appearances.

== Career ==
Despite being born in Finland, Parnela spent all his professional career abroad. He played from 2001 to 2003 in Switzerland for FC Thun, then moving to the Netherlands later that year to join Eerste Divisie club FC Zwolle. In 2004, he then agreed to join another Eerste Divisie team, Go Ahead Eagles from Deventer, where he spent the remainder of his career. Parnela also served as the team captain of Go Ahead Eagles.

In December 2010 Parnela announced his decision to put an end to his professional career and focus on a business career instead, effective 1 January 2011.

He joined Dutch amateurclub SV Zwaluwen Wierden in January 2011.

== Personal life ==
Parnela is of Finnish and Italian descent.

== Career statistics ==
Appearances and goals by club, season and competition
Club	Season	League			Cup		Total	
Club	Season	Division	Apps	Goals	Apps	Goals	Apps	Goals
Thun	2001–02	Swiss Nationalliga B	12	1	2	1	14	2
Thun	2002–03	Swiss Nationalliga A	6	0	0	0	6	0
Thun	Total		18	1	2	1	20	2
Zwolle	2003–04	Eredivisie	8	0	0	0	8	0
Go Ahead Eagles	2004–05	Eerste Divisie	33	1	0	0	33	1
Go Ahead Eagles	2005–06	Eerste Divisie	33	4	0	0	33	4
Go Ahead Eagles	2006–07	Eerste Divisie	39	4	1	0	40	4
Go Ahead Eagles	2007–08	Eerste Divisie	14	0	2	0	16	0
Go Ahead Eagles	2008–09	Eerste Divisie	21	2	0	0	21	2
Go Ahead Eagles	2009–10	Eerste Divisie	19	3	2	0	21	3
Go Ahead Eagles	2010–11	Eerste Divisie	5	0	0	0	5	0
Go Ahead Eagles	Total		164	14	5	0	169	14
SV Zwaluwen Wierden	2011–12	Derde Divisie	23	0	0	0	23	0
Career total			213	15	7	1	220	16
