= Ramon Voorn =

Dutch footballer

Personal information
- Full name: Ramon Voorn
- Date of birth: 1 May 1987 (age 39)
- Place of birth: Berg en Terblijt, Netherlands
- Height: 1.82 m (5 ft 11 1/2 in)
- Position: Midfielder

Youth career
- RKASV
- PSV

Senior career*
Years	Team	Apps	(Gls)
2005–2007	MVV	15	(0)
2007–2015	Fortuna Sittard	213	(21)
2015	→ VVV-Venlo (loan)	15	(0)
- * Club domestic league appearances and goals as of 10 May 2015 (UTC)

Ramon Voorn (born 1 May 1987) is a Dutch professional footballer who plays as a midfielder. He formerly played for MVV, Fortuna Sittard and VVV-Venlo.
