= Maarten Boddaert =

Dutch professional footballer

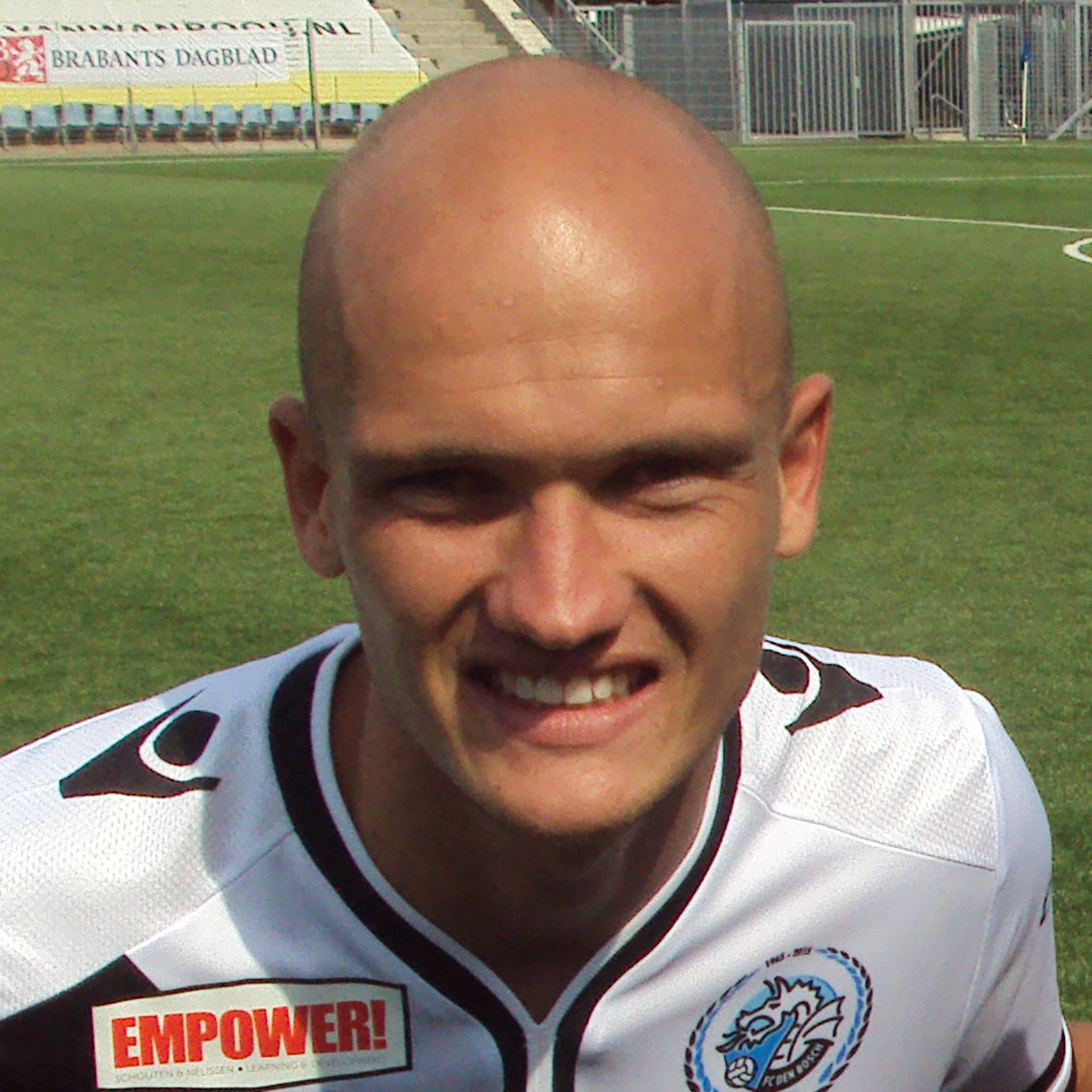

Personal information
- Full name: Maarten Boddaert
- Date of birth: 12 September 1989 (age 37)
- Place of birth: Roosendaal, Netherlands
- Height: 1.80 m (5 ft 11 in)
- Position: Centre-back

Youth career
- 1996–1999: RKVV Roosendaal
- 1999–2008: RBC

Senior career*
Years	Team	Apps	(Gls)
2008–2011	RBC	72	(1)
2011–2016	Den Bosch	105	(6)
2017	Adelaide Comets	10	(0)
2017–2022	Achilles Veen		
- * Club domestic league appearances and goals as of 20 January 2022

Maarten Boddaert (born 12 September 1989) is a Dutch retired footballer who last played for the Hoofdklasse club Achilles Veen.

== Club career ==
Boddaert played 5 seasons as a midfielder for FC Den Bosch in the Dutch Eerste Divisie. He formerly played for RBC Roosendaal. Den Bosch released their former skipper in summer 2016 and he then had a trial at Telstar and a month-long trial with VVV-Venlo but a move did not materialize.

Boddaert signed for Adelaide Comets in the PS4 NPL SA in Australia's second tier of football in January, 2017 for the 2017 FFSA season.

In August 2017, Boddaert returned to the Netherlands where he signed with Achilles Veen. He announced his retirement in 2022 and returned to childhood club RKVV Roosendaal to play in a friends' team.
