= Rudy Jansen =

Dutch footballer

Personal information
- Date of birth: 2 January 1979 (age 47)
- Place of birth: Utrecht, Netherlands
- Position: Defender

Youth career
- SV Geinoord
- Utrecht

Senior career*
| Years | Team | Apps | (Gls) |
| 1998 | Utrecht | 0 | (0) |
| 1999–2006 | Heracles Almelo | 184 | (18) |
| 2006–2008 | Excelsior | 14 | (0) |
| 2007–2008 | → Cambuur Leeuwarden | 37 | (3) |
| 2008–2011 | Cambuur | 61 | (4) |
| 2011 | FC Zwolle | 1 | (0) |
| 2011–2013 | Spakenburg | 37 | (0) |
| Total | | 334 | (25) |
- * Club domestic league appearances and goals

Rudy Jansen (born 2 January 1979) is a Dutch former footballer who played as a defender. His former clubs are FC Utrecht, Heracles Almelo, Excelsior, SC Cambuur, FC Zwolle and Spakenburg.

== Honours ==
Heracles Almelo

- Eerste Divisie: 2004–05
