= Sjaak Lettinga =

Dutch footballer (born 1982)

Personal information
- Date of birth: 16 September 1982 (age 44)
- Place of birth: Amsterdam, Netherlands
- Height: 1.75 m (5 ft 9 in)
- Position: Midfielder

Youth career
- DCG
- Ajax

Senior career*
Years	Team	Apps	(Gls)
2001–2006	Stormvogels Telstar	119	(21)
2006–2007	Volendam	11	(1)
2007–2011	Helmond Sport	78	(8)
2011–2014	Telstar	100	(7)
2014–2015	Katwijk		
2015–2016	IJVV Stormvogels		
Total		308+	(37+)

Managerial career
- 2016–2021: IJVV Stormvogels
- * Club domestic league appearances and goals

Sjaak Lettinga (born 16 September 1982) is a Dutch former professional footballer who played as a midfielder. During his career, he played professionally for Telstar, Volendam, and Helmond Sport.

== Career ==
Lettinga started playing football as a youth at DCG and played in the youth teams of Ajax from the under-11s through to the under-19s. He broke through at Telstar during the 2001–02 season, but at his next club, FC Volendam, he was unable to secure a regular place in the starting line-up.

From the 2007–08 season, Lettinga played for Helmond Sport. He featured in almost every match during his first two seasons there, but a serious groin injury kept him sidelined for a prolonged period. A clause in his contract stipulated that he would earn a new deal if he made at least 25 appearances during the 2010–11 season. As it became clear during the winter break that this target would not be reached, he left the club on a free transfer and returned to Telstar.

In 2014–15, he played as an amateur for VV Katwijk, reaching promotion to the fourth-tier Topklasse with the club. This was followed by a spell at Tweede Klasse club IJVV Stormvogels the following year.

== Coaching career ==
In the 2016–17 season, Lettinga was appointed head coach of his former club Stormvogels, a position he held until 2021.

== Honours ==
Katwijk

- Hoofdklasse Saturday B: 2014–15
