= Gregory Schaken =

Dutch footballer

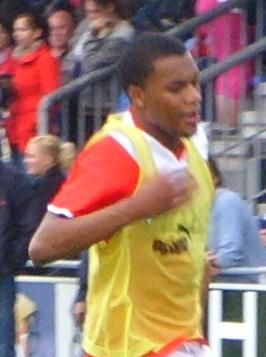

Personal information
- Date of birth: 23 February 1989 (age 37)
- Place of birth: Rotterdam, Netherlands
- Height: 1.87 m (6 ft 2 in)
- Position: Forward

Youth career
- Geuzen Middenmeer
- Zeeburgia
- Ajax
- Utrecht

Senior career*
Years	Team	Apps	(Gls)
2006–2010	Utrecht	9	(0)
2009–2010	→ Telstar (loan)	25	(1)
2011	Sparta Nijkerk		
2011–2012	RVVH		
2012–2013	FC Chabab	26	(0)
2013–2015	OFC		
2015–2018	Zeeburgia		
2018–2020	Zuidvogels		
2020–2021	SV Hoofddorp		
- * Club domestic league appearances and goals as of 17 November 2024

Gregory Schaken (born 23 February 1989) is a Dutch professional footballer who plays as a forward.
