= Alair Cruz Vicente =

Brazilian footballer (born 1981)

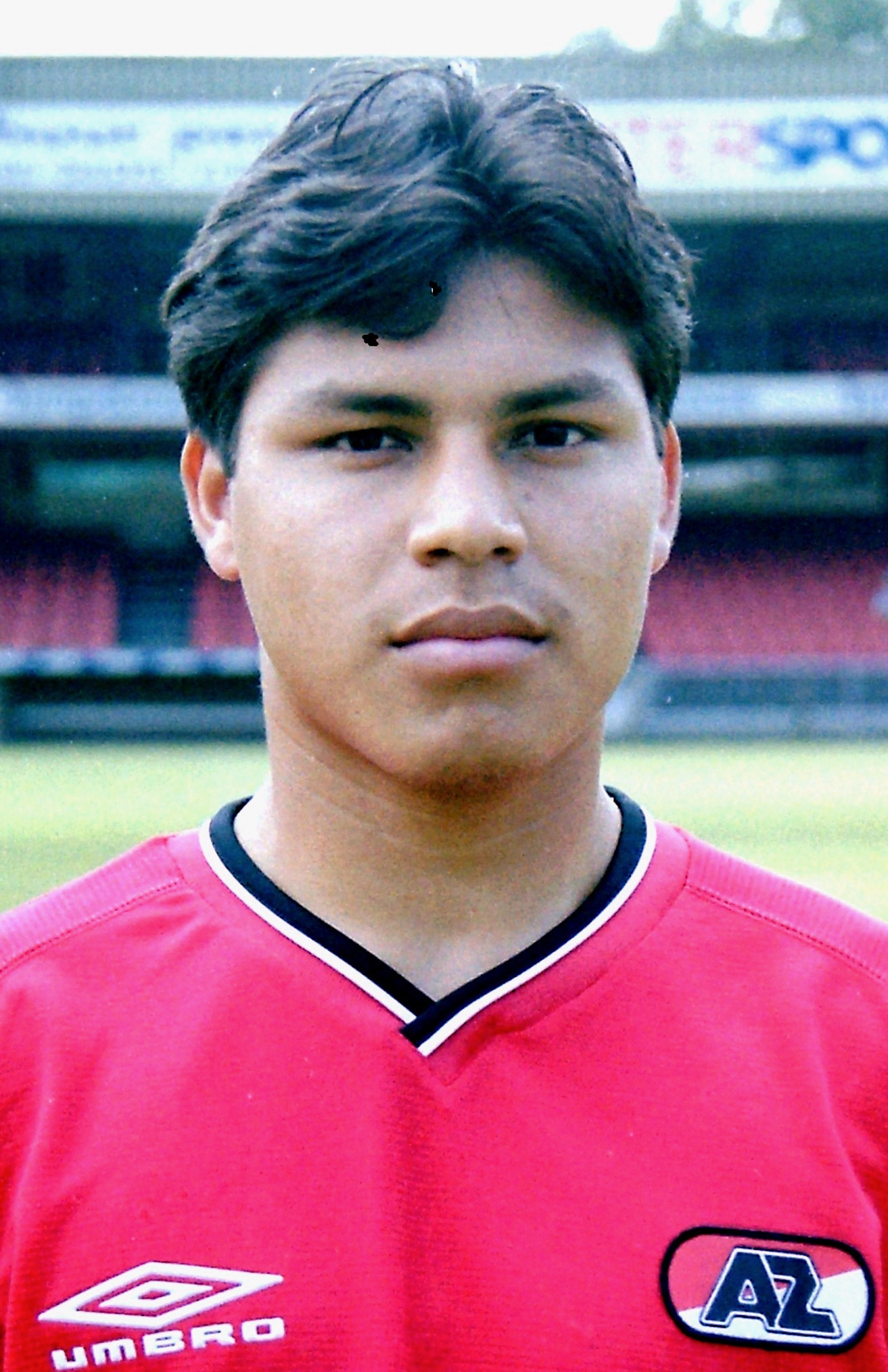
- Cruz Vicente for AZ in 2001

Personal information
- Full name: Alair Cruz Vicente
- Date of birth: 19 April 1981 (age 45)
- Place of birth: Aracruz, Brazil
- Height: 1.72 m (5 ft 8 in)
- Position: Left-back

Team information
- Current team: VfL Germania Leer

Youth career
- Riachuelo
- Desportiva Ferroviária
- 1998–2001: AZ

Senior career*
Years	Team	Apps	(Gls)
2001–2004	AZ	8	(0)
2004–2006	Volendam	68	(0)
2006–2012	Veendam	162	(6)
2012–2013	AGOVV	17	(1)
2013	Sparta	13	(0)
2013–2014	Den Bosch	8	(0)
2014–2015	Telstar	19	(1)
2018	Aracruz		
2018	Pau Brasil		
2018–2019	VV Nieuweschans		
2019–2020	VfL Germania Leer	1	(0)
2020–	Kickers Leer/Germania Leer II		

Managerial career
- 2020–: Kickers Leer/Germania Leer II
- * Club domestic league appearances and goals as of 13 February 2021 (UTC)

Alair Cruz Vicente (born 19 April 1981) is a Brazilian former professional footballer who works as a player-coach for German club Kickers Leer/Germania Leer II. He plays as a left-back.

== Career ==
Born in Aracruz, Cruz Vicente started playing for Riachuelo before being noticed by Corinthians at a youth cup tournament in São Paulo as part of Desportiva Ferroviária. He eventually moved to the Netherlands, signing a youth contract with AZ on 13 April 1998 after the club had brokered a deal through agent Apollonius Konijnenburg.

Cruz Vicente would, besides AZ, play in the Netherlands for FC Volendam, SC Veendam and SC Telstar.

He left Telstar in January 2015, and returned to Brazil in order to work in his parents' coffee plantation. Cruz Vicente also began playing football again after a few years, signing with hometown club EC Aracruz in January 2018, who were competing in the Campeonato Capixaba Série B. After a conflict with management, he moved to Pau Brasil, a club playing in a local competition in an Indian reservation.

In August 2018, Cruz Vicente returned to the Netherlands to play for VV Nieuweschans in the Vijfde Klasse, the tenth and lowest tier of Dutch football, after having initially chosen to play for WVV Winschoten. In July 2019, he moved to German club VfL Germania Leer competing in the Landesliga Weser-Ems. After one season, where he made one official appearance, he moved to the Kickers Leer/Germania Leer II team where he took on a role as player-manager for the Kreisliga team.
