= 2018–19 SC Cambuur season =

Dutch football club season

SC Cambuur
2018–19 season
- Stadium: Kooi Stadion
- Eerste Divisie: 8th
- KNVB Cup: Round of 16
- Top goalscorer: League: Kevin van Kippersluis (10 goals); All: Kevin van Kippersluis (10 goals)
- Highest home attendance: 8,542 (Promotion play-off final 1st match)
- Lowest home attendance: 3,298 (KNVB Cup 2nd round)
- Average home league attendance: 6,974
- Biggest win: 6-0 Jong Ajax (a) 32nd week
- Biggest defeat: 3-0 Sparta Rotterdam (a) 9th week
- All statistics correct as of 12 December 2025.

The 2018–19 season was SC Cambuur's 47th season in the Eerste Divisie (3rd consecutive).

SC Cambuur finished the regular season in 10th place, eliminated in the finals of the promotion play-offs after losing with an aggregate score 3–1 against De Graafschap.

The club also competed in the KNVB Cup, where their campaign ended in the round of 16 following a 2–1 loss to Fortuna Sittard.

== Players ==
=== First-team squad ===
Note: Flags indicate national team as defined under FIFA eligibility rules; some limited exceptions apply. Players may hold more than one non-FIFA nationality.

No.	Pos.	Nation	Player
1	GK	NED	Xavier Mous
2	MF	NED	Jordy van Deelen
3	DF	NED	Emmanuel Mbende
4	DF	NED	Matthew Steenvoorden
5	DF	JPN	Sai van Wermeskerken
6	MF	GER	Kevin Schindler
7	FW	SLE	Issa Kallon
8	MF	BEL	Mathias Schils
8	MF	URU	Matias Jones
9	FW	NED	Nigel Robertha
10	FW	NED	Sam Hendriks
11	FW	NED	Justin Mathieu
12	GK	NED	Pieter Bos
14	DF	NED	Robert van Koesveld

No.	Pos.	Nation	Player
16	MF	NED	Daan Boerlage
17	FW	SUR	Tyrone Conraad
18	MF	NED	Julian Calor
19	FW	SUI	Karim Rossi
20	DF	FRA	Robin Maulun
21	DF	NED	Robbert Schilder
22	DF	LVA	Andrejs Ciganiks
24	FW	GAB	David Sambissa
23	DF	NED	Omar El Baad
27	MF	NED	Kevin Jansen
28	MF	NED	Rutger Etten
29	FW	NED	Kevin van Kippersluis
31	MF	NED	Nino van den Beemt
39	MF	SLE	Alex Bangura

== Transfers ==
=== In ===
Pos.	Player	Transferred from	Fee	Date
DF	(Latvia) Andrejs Ciganiks	(Germany) FC Schalke 04 II	Free	1 July 2018
FW	(Gabon) David Sambissa	(Netherlands) Jong FC Twente	Free	1 July 2018
DF	(Cameroon) Emmanuel Mbende	(Germany) Chemnitzer FC	Free	1 July 2018
MF	(Netherlands) Julian Calor	(Netherlands) SBV Vitesse	Free	1 July 2018
MF	(France) Robin Maulun	(France) Trélissac-Antonne Périgord FC	Free	1 July 2018
GK	(Netherlands) Xavier Mous	(Netherlands) TOP Oss	Free	1 July 2018
MF	(Germany) Kevin Schindler	No club		10 July 2018
MF	(Netherlands) Kevin Jansen	(Netherlands) NEC Nijmegen	Free	6 January 2019
MF	(Uruguay) Matías Jones	(Uruguay) River Plate	Free	30 January 2019
FW	(Netherlands) Sam Hendriks	(Belgium) Oud-Heverlee Leuven	On loan	31 January 2019

=== Out ===
Pos.	Player	Transferred to	Fee	Date
MF	(England) Daniel Crowley	(Netherlands) Willem II Tilburg	End of loan	30 June 2018
MF	(Netherlands) Darren Rosheuvel	(Netherlands) SC Telstar	Free	1 July 2018
FW	(Netherlands) Furdjel Narsingh	(Netherlands) De Graafschap	Free	1 July 2018
GK	(Netherlands) Jesse Bertrams	No club		1 July 2018
MF	(Netherlands) Kenny Teijsse	(Netherlands) AFC Amsterdam	Free	1 July 2018
DF	(Netherlands) Martijn van der Laan	No club		1 July 2018
FW	(Netherlands) Martijn Barto	(Netherlands) ONS Sneek	Free	20 July 2018
GK	(Netherlands) Erik Cummins	(Netherlands) FC Lisse	Free	1 August 2018
FW	(Netherlands) Alvin Daniels	(Netherlands) FC Eindhoven	Free	14 August 2018
MF	(Netherlands) Jurjan Mannes	(Netherlands) HHC Hardenberg	Free	23 August 2018
FW	(Netherlands) Xander Houtkoop	(Norway) Hamarkameratene	Free	29 August 2018
DF	(Netherlands) Cody Claver	(Netherlands) AFC Amsterdam	Free	16 January 2019
MF	(Netherlands) Rutger Etten	(Netherlands) HHC Hardenberg	Free	23 January 2019
MF	(Belgium) Mathias Schils	(Belgium) K.M.S.K. Deinze		30 January 2019
FW	(Switzerland) Karim Rossi	(Netherlands) SC Telstar	Free	31 January 2019
MF	(Netherlands) Justin Mathieu	(Croatia) HNK Gorica	€15,000	15 February 2019
DF	(Netherlands) Omar El Baad	(Sweden) Umeå FC	Free	1 March 2019

== Competitions ==
=== Overall record ===
Competition	First match	Last match	Starting round	Final position	Record							
Competition	First match	Last match	Starting round	Final position	Pld	W	D	L	GF	GA	GD	Win %
Eerste Divisie	17 August 2018	3 May 2019	Week 1	10th	38	16	10	12	61	48	+13	42.11
Promotion play-offs	10 May 2019	22 May 2019	1st round	Final	4	1	2	1	5	6	−1	25.00
KNVB Cup	25 September 2018	19 December 2018	1st round	Round of 16	3	2	0	1	6	5	+1	66.67
Total					45	19	12	14	72	59	+13	42.22

Source: ESPN

=== Eerste Divisie ===
==== League table ====
Pos	Team	Pld	W	D	L	GF	GA	GD	Pts	Promotion or qualification
8	RKC Waalwijk (O, P)	38	18	5	15	69	57	+12	59	Qualification to promotion play-offs first round
9	NEC	38	16	10	12	73	60	+13	58	Qualification to promotion play-offs first round
10	Cambuur	38	16	10	12	61	48	+13	58	Qualification to promotion play-offs first round
11	Jong Ajax (Note: Reserves teams aren't eligible to be promoted to the Eredivisie)	38	16	8	14	81	67	+14	56	
12	MVV	38	14	12	12	49	53	−4	54	

Source: Soccerway, Keuken Kampioen Divisie (in Dutch)
Rules for classification: Season in progress: 1) Most points won; 2) Less points lost; 3) Goal difference; 4) Goals scored; 5) Alphabetical order. End of season: 1) Points; 2) Goal difference; 3) Goals scored; 4) Head-to-head points; 5) Head-to-head goal difference; 6) Head-to-head away goals scored; 7) Play-off if relevant for deciding champion, relegation, international competitions and play-offs qualification, otherwise by draw. 8) Penalty shoot-out (only after a play-off)
(O) Play-off winners; (P) Promoted

==== Results summary ====
Overall								Home						Away					
Pld	W	D	L	GF	GA	GD	Pts	W	D	L	GF	GA	GD	W	D	L	GF	GA	GD
38	16	10	12	61	48	+13	58	9	5	5	32	21	+11	7	5	7	29	27	+2

Source: https://www.espn.nl/voetbal/team/scorebord/_/id/3736/season/2017

==== Results by round ====
Round	1	2	3	4	5	6	7	8	9	10	11	12	13	14	15	16	17	18	19	20	21	22	23	24	25	26	27	28	29	30	31	32	33	34	35	36	37	38
Ground	A	H	A	H	H	A	H	A	A	H	A	H	A	H	A	H	A	H	A	H	A	H	A	H	A	H	H	A	H	A	H	A	A	H	A	H	H	A
Result	D	W	W	W	W	D	L	L	L	W	L	W	L	D	D	L	W	L	W	D	W	D	L	D	L	L	D	W	W	W	L	W	L	W	D	W	W	D
Position																																						10

Source: ESPN
A = Away; H = Home; W = Win; D = Draw; L = Loss

=== Matches ===
==== 1st half ====
17 August 2018 1st week	NEC Nijmegen	2-2	SC Cambuur	Nijmegen
20:00	Anass Achahbar 43'; Sven Braken 59'	Report	Frank Sturing 87' (o.g.); Emmanuel Mbende 90+4'	Stadium: Goffertstadion; Attendance: 9,888

24 August 2018 2nd week	SC Cambuur	2-1	Jong AZ	Leeuwarden
20:00	Justin Mathieu 27'; Karim Rossi 74'	Report	Ferdy Druijf 73' (pen.)	Stadium: Cambuur Stadion; Attendance: 6,422

31 August 2018 3rd week	TOP Oss	1-3	SC Cambuur	Oss
20:00	Bryan Smeets 12'	Report	Karim Rossi 47' 87' 90+2'	Stadium: Frans Heesen Stadion; Attendance: 1,412

7 September 2018 4th week	SC Cambuur	2-0	RKC Waalwijk	Leeuwarden
20:00	Karim Rossi 8'; Justin Mathieu 57'	Report		Stadium: Cambuur Stadion; Attendance: 7,381

14 September 2018 5th week	SC Cambuur	2-0	SC Telstar	Leeuwarden
20:00	Kevin van Kippersluis 21'; Justin Mathieu 76'	Report		Stadium: Cambuur Stadion; Attendance: 7,362

21 September 2018 6th week	Jong Utrecht	0-0	SC Cambuur	Utrecht
20:00		Report		Stadium: Stadion Galgenwaard; Attendance: 473

28 September 2018 7th week	SC Cambuur	0-1	Roda JC Kerkrade	Leeuwarden
20:00		Report	Gyliano van Velzen 53'	Stadium: Cambuur Stadion; Attendance: 7,654

5 October 2018 8th week	FC Dordrecht	3-1	SC Cambuur	Dordrecht
20:00	Maarten Peijnenburg 26'; Savvas Mourgos 62' (pen.) 90'	Report	Tyrone Conraad 50'	Stadium: Stadion Krommedijk; Attendance: 1,658

14 October 2018 9th week	Sparta Rotterdam	3-0	SC Cambuur	Rotterdam
14:30	David Sambissa 7' (o.g.); Lars Veldwijk 40' (pen.); Mohamed Rayhi 76'	Report		Stadium: Het Kasteel; Attendance: 8,878

19 October 2018 10th week	SC Cambuur	3-1	Helmond Sport	Leeuwarden
20:00	Kevin van Kippersluis 38' 42'; Nigel Robertha 59'	Report	Bram Zwanen 45+1'	Stadium: Cambuur Stadion; Attendance: 7,021

26 October 2018 11th week	Go Ahead Eagles	2-0	SC Cambuur	Deventer
20:00	Orhan Džepar 86'; Jaroslav Navratil 89'	Report		Stadium: De Adelaarshorst; Attendance: 8,937

2 November 2018 12th week	SC Cambuur	2-1	Jong Ajax	Leeuwarden
20:00	Justin Mathieu 6' 53' (pen.)	Report	Noa Lang 77'	Stadium: Cambuur Stadion; Attendance: 7,131

9 November 2018 13th week	Almere City FC	2-1	SC Cambuur	Almere
20:00	James Efmorfidis 29'; Torino Hunte 58'	Report	Nigel Robertha 39'	Stadium: Yanmar Stadion; Attendance: 2,075

17 November 2018 14th week	SC Cambuur	1-1	FC Volendam	Leeuwarden
20:45	Kevin van Kippersluis 44' (pen.)	Report	Nick Doodeman 16'	Stadium: Cambuur Stadion; Attendance: 7,021

23 November 2018 15th week	FC Den Bosch	1-1	SC Cambuur	Den Bosch
20:00	Danny Verbeek 80'	Report	Nigel Robertha 49'	Stadium: De Vliert; Attendance: 3,569

30 November 2018 16th week	SC Cambuur	1-3	FC Eindhoven	Leeuwarden
20:00	Kevin van Kippersluis 20'	Report	Marcelo Lopes 3'; Alvin Daniels 24'; Jarno Janssen 79'	Stadium: Cambuur Stadion; Attendance: 6,822

10 December 2018 17th week	Jong PSV	1-2	SC Cambuur	Eindhoven
20:00	Cody Gakpo 23'	Report	Kevin Schindler 13'; Robin Maulun 84' (pen.)	Stadium: De Herdgang; Attendance: 283

14 December 2018 18th week	SC Cambuur	0-1	FC Twente	Leeuwarden
20:00		Report	Aitor Cantalapiedra 61'	Stadium: Cambuur Stadion; Attendance: 8,191

23 December 2018 19th week	MVV Maastricht	1-2	SC Cambuur	Maastricht
14:30	Joeri Schroyen 77'	Report	Robin Maulun 47' (pen.); Tyrone Conraad 51'	Stadium: De Geusselt; Attendance: 4,200

==== 2nd half ====
13 January 2019 20th week	SC Cambuur	3-3	Sparta Rotterdam	Leeuwarden
14:30	Matthew Steenvoorden 22'; Nigel Robertha 31'; Kevin Jansen 78'	Report	Mohamed Rayhi 10'; Lars Veldwijk 45'; Deroy Duarte 88'	Stadium: Cambuur Stadion; Attendance: 7,654

18 January 2019 21st week	Helmond Sport	0-1	SC Cambuur	Helmond
20:00		Report	Tyrone Conraad 55'	Stadium: Stadion De Braak; Attendance: 1,111

28 January 2019 22nd week	SC Cambuur	1-1	Go Ahead Eagles	Leeuwarden
20:00	Kevin van Kippersluis 33'	Report	Roland Baas 89'	Stadium: Cambuur Stadion; Attendance: 6,921

4 February 2019 23rd week	Jong AZ	2-1	SC Cambuur	The Hague
20:00	Ondrej Mihalik 4'; Kenzo Goudmijn 45+1'	Report	Kevin van Kippersluis 90+3' (pen.)	Stadium: AFAS Trainingscomplex; Attendance: 450

8 February 2019 24th week	SC Cambuur	1-1	NEC Nijmegen	Leeuwarden
20:00	Matthew Steenvoorden 28'	Report	Josef Kvida 52'	Stadium: Cambuur Stadion; Attendance: 7,010

15 February 2019 25th week	Roda JC Kerkrade	1-0	SC Cambuur	Kerkrade
20:00	Livio Milts 4'	Report		Stadium: Parkstad Limburg Stadion; Attendance: 6,535

22 February 2019 26th week	SC Cambuur	1-3	FC Dordrecht	Leeuwarden
20:00	Tyrone Conraad 10'	Report	Crysencio Summerville 72'; Daniël Breedijk 90+3' (pen.); Jeremy Cijntje 90+8'	Stadium: Cambuur Stadion; Attendance: 7,384

1 March 2019 27th week	SC Cambuur	0-0	TOP Oss	Leeuwarden
20:00		Report		Stadium: Cambuur Stadion; Attendance: 6,424

8 March 2019 28th week	RKC Waalwijk	0-2	SC Cambuur	Waalwijk
20:00		Report	Robin Maulun 8'; Sam Hendriks 89'	Stadium: Mandemakers Stadion; Attendance: 2,259

15 March 2019 29th week	SC Cambuur	3-1	Jong PSV	Leeuwarden
20:00	Kevin van Kippersluis 24'; Sam Hendriks 41' 75'	Report	Lennerd Daneels 86'	Stadium: Cambuur Stadion; Attendance: 6,342

22 March 2019 30th week	FC Volendam	0-1	SC Cambuur	Volendam
20:00		Report	Sam Hendriks 79'	Stadium: Kras Stadion; Attendance: 3,590

29 March 2019 31st week	SC Cambuur	0-1	Almere City FC	Leeuwarden
20:00		Report	Stijn Meijer 64'	Stadium: Cambuur Stadion; Attendance: 7,132

1 April 2019 32nd week	Jong Ajax	0-6	SC Cambuur	Duivendrecht
20:00		Report	Sam Hendriks 8' 37'; Matthew Steenvoorden 11' 67'; Nigel Robertha 22' 32'	Stadium: Sportpark De Toekomst; Attendance: 453

5 April 2019 33rd week	SC Telstar	4-2	SC Cambuur	Velsen-Zuid
20:00	Terell Ondaan 6' (pen.); Sven van Doorm 20'; Frank Korpershoek 41'; Rodny Lopes Cabral 53'	Report	Sam Hendriks 57'; Matthew Steenvoorden 86'	Stadium: BUKO Stadion; Attendance: 1,878

12 April 2019 34th week	SC Cambuur	4-1	Jong Utrecht	Leeuwarden
20:00	Sai van Wermeskerken 6'; Kevin van Kippersluis 35'; Junior van der Velden 47' (o.g.); Robin Maulun 65'	Report	Nick Venema 45' (pen.)	Stadium: Cambuur Stadion; Attendance: 6,380

19 April 2019 35th week	FC Eindhoven	2-2	SC Cambuur	Eindhoven
20:00	Alvin Daniels 56'; Elisha Sam 61'	Report	Kevin van Kippersluis 65'; Sam Hendriks 90+2'	Stadium: Jan Louwers Stadion; Attendance: 2,254

22 April 2019 36th week	SC Cambuur	2-0	FC Den Bosch	Leeuwarden
14:30	Leo Väisänen 34' (o.g.); Matthew Steenvoorden 62'	Report		Stadium: Cambuur Stadion; Attendance: 7,375

26 April 2019 37th week	SC Cambuur	4-1	MVV Maastricht	Leeuwarden
20:00	Robin Maulun 28' (pen.) 45+3' (pen.) 90+2'; Robbert Schilder 55'	Report	Emmanuel Mbende 66' (o.g.)	Stadium: Cambuur Stadion; Attendance: 7,121

3 May 2019 38th week	FC Twente	2-2	SC Cambuur	Enschede
20:00	Tom Boere 5'; Mohamed Hamdaoui 37'	Report	Robbert Schilder 88'; Nigel Robertha 90+3'	Stadium: De Grolsch Veste; Attendance: 27,300

==== Promotion Play-offs ====
10 May 2019 Promotion play-off 1st round 1st match	SC Cambuur	2-2	Almere City FC	Leeuwarden
20:45	Emmanuel Mbende 40'; Andrejs Ciganiks 68'	Report	Anwar Bensabouh 16'; Stijn Meijer 61'	Stadium: Cambuur Stadion; Attendance: 6,843

14 May 2019 Promotion play-off 1st round 2nd match	Almere City FC	1-2	SC Cambuur	Almere
20:45	Niek Vossebelt 50'	Report	Nigel Robertha 16'; Anwar Bensabouh 19' (o.g.)	Stadium: Yanmar Stadion; Attendance: 2,569

SC Cambuur won 4–3 on aggregate.

19 May 2019 Promotion play-off final 1st match	SC Cambuur	1-1	De Graafschap	Leeuwarden
20:00	Robin Maulun 35'	Report	Furdjel Narsingh 33'	Stadium: Cambuur Stadion; Attendance: 8,542

22 May 2019 Promotion play-off final 2nd match	De Graafschap	2-0	SC Cambuur	Doetinchem
20:45	Charlison Benschop 24' 40' (pen.)	Report		Stadium: De Vijverberg; Attendance: 10,611

De Graafschap won 3–1 on aggregate.

=== KNVB Cup ===
25 September 2018 1st round	SVV Scheveningen	2-3 (a.e.t.)	SC Cambuur	Den Haag
19:45	Joël Donald 35' 45+4'	Report	Andrejs Cigaņiks 31'; Nigel Robertha 89'; Sai van Wermeskerken 105'	Stadium: Sportpark Houtrust; Attendance: 450

30 October 2018 2nd round	SC Cambuur	2-1	Koninklijke HFC	Leeuwarden
19:45	Justin Mathieu 19'; Tyrone Conraad 55'	Report	Jacob Noordmans 72'	Stadium: Cambuur Stadion; Attendance: 3,298

19 December 2018 Round of 16	Fortuna Sittard	2-1	SC Cambuur	Sittard
19:45	Lisandro Semedo 19'; Lazaros Lamprou 80'	Report	Karim Rossi 90'	Stadium: Fortuna Sittard Stadion; Attendance: 3,522

== Statistics ==
=== Scorers ===
#	Player	Eerste Divisie	Promotion Play-offs	KNVB	Total
1	(Netherlands) Kevin van Kippersluis	10	0	0	10
2	(Netherlands) Nigel Robertha	7	1	1	9
3	(France) Robin Maulun	7	1	0	8
3	(Netherlands) Sam Hendriks	8	0	0	8
5	(Netherlands) Justin Mathieu	5	0	1	6
5	(Switzerland) Karim Rossi	5	0	1	6
5	(Netherlands) Matthew Steenvoorden	6	0	0	6
8	(Suriname) Tyrone Conraad	4	0	1	5
9	(Latvia) Andrejs Ciganiks	0	1	1	2
9	(Netherlands) Emmanuel Mbende	1	1	0	2
9	(Netherlands) Robbert Schilder	2	0	0	2
9	(Japan) Sai van Wermeskerken	1	0	1	2
13	(Netherlands) Kevin Jansen	1	0	0	1
13	(Germany) Kevin Schindler	1	0	0	1

=== Appearances ===
#	Player	Eerste Divisie	Promotion Play-offs	KNVB	Total
1	(Japan) Sai van Wermeskerken	38	3	3	44
2	(Netherlands) Xavier Mous	38	2	3	43
3	(Netherlands) Robbert Schilder	36	3	3	42
4	(France) Robin Maulun	33	3	2	38
5	(Gabon) David Sambissa	32	3	2	37
6	(Netherlands) Kevin van Kippersluis	31	2	2	35
6	(Netherlands) Nigel Robertha	30	3	2	35
8	(Sierra Leone) Issa Kallon	27	3	3	33
9	(Latvia) Andrejs Ciganiks	27	3	2	32
9	(Netherlands) Emmanuel Mbende	26	3	3	32
11	(Suriname) Tyrone Conraad	24	0	3	27
12	(Netherlands) Matthew Steenvoorden	21	3	1	25
13	(Switzerland) Karim Rossi	20	0	3	23
14	(Netherlands) Kevin Jansen	18	3	0	21
15	(Belgium) Mathias Schils	17	0	2	19
16	(Netherlands) Justin Mathieu	15	0	2	17
17	(Germany) Kevin Schindler	15	0	1	16
18	(Sierra Leone) Alex Bangura	13	1	0	14
18	(Netherlands) Daan Boerlage	14	0	0	14
18	(Netherlands) Sam Hendriks	14	0	0	14
21	(Netherlands) Nino van den Beemt	10	0	1	11
22	(Uruguay) Matias Jones	9	0	0	9
23	(Netherlands) Omar El Baad	5	0	1	6
24	(Netherlands) Julian Calor	4	0	1	5
25	(Netherlands) Jordy van Deelen	2	0	1	3
25	(Netherlands) Robert van Koesveld	3	0	0	3
27	(Netherlands) Pieter Bos	1	1	0	2
28	(Netherlands) Rutger Etten	0	0	1	1

=== Clean sheets ===
#	Player	Eerste Divisie
1	(Netherlands) Xavier Mous	9

=== Disciplinary record ===
#	Player	Eerste Divisie		Promotion Play-offs		KNVB		Total	
#	Player	Booked	Sent off (straight red)	Booked	Sent off (straight red)	Booked	Sent off (straight red)	Booked	Sent off (straight red)
1	(Netherlands) Emmanuel Mbende	7	0	0	1	0	0	7	1
2	(Netherlands) Justin Mathieu	2	1	0	0	0	0	2	1
2	(Latvia) Andrejs Ciganiks	4	0	1	0	2	0	7	0
4	(Netherlands) Matthew Steenvoorden	5	0	1	0	0	0	6	0
5	(Netherlands) Kevin van Kippersluis	5	0	0	0	0	0	5	0
5	(Netherlands) Robbert Schilder	5	0	0	0	0	0	5	0
7	(Switzerland) Karim Rossi	3	0	0	0	1	0	4	0
7	(Netherlands) Kevin Jansen	3	0	1	0	0	0	4	0
7	(Germany) Kevin Schindler	4	0	0	0	0	0	4	0
7	(France) Robin Maulun	3	0	1	0	0	0	4	0
7	(Suriname) Tyrone Conraad	3	0	0	0	1	0	4	0
12	(Sierra Leone) Issa Kallon	3	0	0	0	0	0	3	0
12	(Netherlands) Nino van den Beemt	2	0	0	0	1	0	3	0
12	(Japan) Sai van Wermeskerken	3	0	0	0	0	0	3	0
15	(Netherlands) Daan Boerlage	2	0	0	0	0	0	2	0
15	(Netherlands) Robert van Koesveld	2	0	0	0	0	0	2	0
17	(Sierra Leone) Alex Bangura	1	0	0	0	0	0	1	0
17	(Gabon) David Sambissa	1	0	0	0	0	0	1	0
17	(Belgium) Mathias Schils	1	0	0	0	0	0	1	0
17	(Netherlands) Nigel Robertha	1	0	0	0	0	0	1	0
17	(Netherlands) Rutger Etten	0	0	0	0	1	0	1	0
17	(Netherlands) Xavier Mous	1	0	0	0	0	0	1	0
