= 2017–18 SC Cambuur season =

Dutch football club season

SC Cambuur
2017–18 season
- Stadium: Kooi Stadion
- Eerste Divisie: 8th
- KNVB Cup: Quarter-final
- Top goalscorer: League: Martijn Barto (12 goals); All: Martijn Barto (14 goals)
- Highest home attendance: 8,233 (37th week)
- Lowest home attendance: 4,506 (KNVB Cup round of 16)
- Average home league attendance: 7,166
- Biggest win: 5-1 Helmond Sport (a) KNVB Cup 1st round
- Biggest defeat: 3-0 Helmond Sport (a) 18th week 4-1 FC Dordrecht (a) Promotion play-off 1st round 2nd match
- All statistics correct as of 8 December 2025.

The 2017–18 season was SC Cambuur's 46th season in the Eerste Divisie (2nd consecutive).

SC Cambuur finished the regular season in 8th place, eliminated in the semi-finals of the promotion play-offs after losing with an aggregate score 3–2 against MVV Maastricht.

The club also competed in the KNVB Cup, where their campaign ended in the quarter-final following a 3–1 loss to FC Twente.

== Players ==
=== First-team squad ===
Note: Flags indicate national team as defined under FIFA eligibility rules; some limited exceptions apply. Players may hold more than one non-FIFA nationality.

No.	Pos.	Nation	Player
1	GK	NED	Jesse Bertrams
2	MF	NED	Jordy van Deelen
3	DF	NED	Omar El Baad
4	DF	NED	Matthew Steenvoorden
6	DF	NED	Martijn van der Laan
6	MF	NED	Jurjan Mannes
7	FW	FRA	Alvin Daniels
7	DF	JPN	Sai van Wermeskerken
8	FW	SLE	Issa Kallon
9	FW	NED	Martijn Barto
10	MF	NED	Ricardo Kip
11	FW	NED	Justin Mathieu
12	MF	NED	Xander Houtkoop
14	MF	NED	Bryan Smeets

No.	Pos.	Nation	Player
14	MF	ENG	Daniel Crowley
15	MF	NED	Daan Boerlage
16	MF	BEL	Mathias Schils
17	FW	NED	Kevin van Kippersluis
19	FW	NED	Nigel Robertha
20	DF	NED	Darren Rosheuvel
21	DF	NED	Robbert Schilder
22	GK	NED	Erik Cummins
23	MF	NED	Kenny Teijsse
23	DF	NED	Marvin Peersman
27	FW	NED	Furdjel Narsingh
30	FW	SUI	Karim Rossi
32	DF	NED	Cody Claver

== Transfers ==
=== In ===
Pos.	Player	Transferred from	Fee	Date
FW	(France) Alvin Daniels	(Netherlands) FC Dordrecht	Free	1 July 2017
FW	(Netherlands) Furdjel Narsingh	No club		1 July 2017
GK	(Netherlands) Jesse Bertrams	(Belgium) Lommel S.K.	Free	1 July 2017
MF	(Netherlands) Justin Mathieu	(Netherlands) TOP Oss		4 July 2017
FW	(Curaçao) Nigel Robertha	(Netherlands) Feyenoord U19	Free	5 July 2017
MF	(Netherlands) Bryan Smeets	(Netherlands) De Graafschap	Free	25 July 2017
MF	(Netherlands) Darren Rosheuvel	(Netherlands) FC Utrecht	Free	25 July 2017
MF	(Belgium) Mathias Schils	(Belgium) Lommel S.K.		25 July 2017
DF	(Netherlands) Martijn van der Laan	(Netherlands) FC Groningen	Free	28 July 2017
FW	(Sierra Leone) Issa Kallon	(Netherlands) FC Utrecht		14 August 2017
DF	(Japan) Sai van Wermeskerken	(Netherlands) FC Dordrecht		21 August 2017
FW	(Switzerland) Karim Rossi	(Switzerland) FC Lugano	Free	25 August 2017
FW	(Netherlands) Kevin van Kippersluis	(Netherlands) FC Volendam		31 August 2017
MF	(England) Daniel Crowley	(Netherlands) Willem II Tilburg	On loan	31 January 2018
MF	(Netherlands) Kenny Teijsse	No club		31 January 2018

=== Out ===
Pos.	Player	Transferred to	Fee	Date
MF	(Afghanistan) Farshad Noor	(Netherlands) Roda JC Kerkrade	End of loan	30 June 2017
FW	(Morocco) Tarik Tissoudali	(France) Le Havre AC	End of loan	30 June 2017
DF	(Suriname) Delvechio Blackson	(Netherlands) Almere City FC	Free	1 July 2017
MF	(Suriname) Djavan Anderson	No club		1 July 2017
GK	(Netherlands) Harm Zeinstra	(Netherlands) Heracles Almelo	Free	1 July 2017
MF	(Cape Verde) Jamiro Monteiro	(Netherlands) Heracles Almelo	€450,000	1 July 2017
FW	(Netherlands) Sander van de Streek	(Netherlands) FC Utrecht	€600,000	1 July 2017
GK	(Netherlands) Leonard Nienhuis	(Netherlands) Sparta Rotterdam	Free	7 August 2017
FW	(Indonesia) Stefano Lilipaly	(Indonesia) Bali United F.C.		11 August 2017
FW	(Netherlands) Michiel Hemmen	(Netherlands) FC Emmen	Free	14 August 2017
FW	(Netherlands) Jergé Hoefdraad	(Netherlands) Almere City FC	Free	15 August 2017
DF	(Belgium) Marvin Peersman	(Israel) Hapoel Tel Aviv		30 January 2018
MF	(Netherlands) Bryan Smeets	No club		31 January 2018

== Competitions ==
=== Overall record ===
Competition	First match	Last match	Starting round	Final position	Record							
Competition	First match	Last match	Starting round	Final position	Pld	W	D	L	GF	GA	GD	Win %
Eerste Divisie	18 August 2017	28 April 2018	Week 1	8th	38	16	10	12	58	53	+5	42.11
Promotion play-offs	1 May 2018	5 May 2018	1st round	1st round	2	1	0	1	5	5	+0	50.00
KNVB Cup	19 September 2017	30 January 2018	1st round	Quarter-final	4	3	0	1	11	4	+7	75.00
Total					44	20	10	14	74	62	+12	45.45

Source: ESPN

=== Eerste Divisie ===
==== League table ====
Pos	Team	Pld	W	D	L	GF	GA	GD	Pts	Promotion, qualification or relegation
1	Jong Ajax (Note: Reserves teams aren't eligible to be promoted to the Eredivisie.) (C)	38	25	4	9	89	54	+35	79	
2	Fortuna Sittard (Note: Winner of the Second and Fourth Period (games 12-20 and 30-38).) (P)	38	24	6	8	81	41	+40	78	Promotion to the Eredivisie
3	NEC (Note: Winner of the First Period (games 3-11).)	38	22	8	8	82	46	+36	74	Qualification to promotion play-offs Second round
4	De Graafschap (O, P)	38	18	11	9	78	47	+31	65	Qualification to promotion play-offs Second round
5	Jong PSV	38	19	7	12	76	54	+22	64	
6	Telstar	38	16	13	9	66	63	+3	61	Qualification to promotion play-offs Second round
7	Emmen (O, P)	38	14	16	8	58	50	+8	58	Qualification to promotion play-offs Second round
8	Cambuur	38	16	10	12	58	53	+5	58	Qualification to promotion play-offs First round
9	Almere City	38	15	7	16	70	76	−6	52	Qualification to promotion play-offs First round
10	MVV	38	14	8	16	57	56	+1	50	Qualification to promotion play-offs First round
11	Den Bosch	38	12	11	15	59	55	+4	47	
12	Eindhoven	38	14	5	19	61	83	−22	47	
13	Dordrecht (Note: Winner of the Third Period (games 21-29).)	38	14	5	19	57	81	−24	47	Qualification to promotion play-offs First round
14	Volendam	38	13	7	18	59	67	−8	46	
15	Oss	38	12	10	16	53	65	−12	46	
16	Jong AZ	38	14	4	20	57	70	−13	46	
17	Go Ahead Eagles	38	9	10	19	48	68	−20	37	
18	RKC Waalwijk	38	8	13	17	37	61	−24	37	
19	Helmond Sport	38	9	9	20	50	67	−17	36	
20	Jong FC Utrecht (R)	38	7	6	25	37	76	−39	27	Relegation to the Tweede Divisie

Source: Soccerway, Jupiler League (in Dutch)
Rules for classification: Season in progress: 1) Most points won; 2) Less points lost; 3) Goal difference; 4) Goals scored; 5) Alphabetical order. End of season: 1) Points; 2) Goal difference; 3) Goals scored; 4) Head-to-head points; 5) Head-to-head goal difference; 6) Head-to-head away goals scored; 7) Play-off if relevant for deciding champion, relegation, international competitions and play-offs qualification, otherwise by draw. 8) Penalty shoot-out (only after a play-off)
(C) Champions; (O) Play-off winners; (P) Promoted; (R) Relegated

==== Results summary ====
Overall								Home						Away					
Pld	W	D	L	GF	GA	GD	Pts	W	D	L	GF	GA	GD	W	D	L	GF	GA	GD
38	16	10	12	58	53	+5	58	9	6	6	34	27	+7	7	4	6	24	26	−2

Source: https://www.espn.nl/voetbal/team/scorebord/_/id/3736/season/2017

==== Results by round ====
Round	1	2	3	4	5	6	7	8	9	10	11	12	13	14	15	16	17	18	19	20	21	22	23	24	25	26	27	28	29	30	31	32	33	34	35	36	37	38
Ground	H	A	A	H	A	A	H	H	H	A	H	A	H	H	A	H	H	A	H	A	A	A	H	H	A	H	A	H	A	H	A	H	H	A	H	A	H	A
Result	L	L	W	D	W	D	D	L	L	D	L	L	W	D	L	W	W	L	W	W	L	W	W	L	D	D	L	W	D	D	L	D	W	W	W	W	W	W
Position																																						8

Source: ESPN
A = Away; H = Home; W = Win; D = Draw; L = Loss

=== Matches ===
==== 1st half ====
18 August 2017 1st week	SC Cambuur	1–2	Jong Ajax	Leeuwarden
20:00	Matthew Steenvoorden 64'	Report	Darren Sidoel 26'; Mateo Casierra 41'	Stadium: Cambuur Stadion; Attendance: 7,334

25 August 2017 2nd week	De Graafschap	2–0	SC Cambuur	Doetinchem
20:00	Fabian Serrarens 31'; Mateo Casierra 41'	Report		Stadium: De Vijverberg; Attendance: 8,014

3 September 2017 3rd week	FC Volendam	0–1	SC Cambuur	Volendam
12:30		Report	Xander Houtkoop 54'	Stadium: Kras Stadion; Attendance: 3,259

8 September 2017 4th week	SC Cambuur	2–2	Jong Utrecht	Leeuwarden
20:30	Alvin Daniels 42'; Matthew Steenvoorden 79'	Report	Nick Venema 75'; Maarten Peijnenburg 86'	Stadium: Cambuur Stadion; Attendance: 6,732

15 September 2017 5th week	Go Ahead Eagles	1–3	SC Cambuur	Deventer
20:00	Sam Hendriks 61'	Report	Justin Mathieu 58'; Karim Rossi 71'; Martijn Barto 86'	Stadium: De Adelaarshorst; Attendance: 7,859

22 September 2017 6th week	MVV Maastricht	1–1	SC Cambuur	Maastricht
20:00	Jonathan Okita 25'	Report	Martijn Barto 66'	Stadium: De Geusselt; Attendance: 4,903

29 September 2017 7th week	SC Cambuur	1–1	RKC Waalwijk	Leeuwarden
20:00	Issa Kallon 44'	Report	Johan Voskamp 22'	Stadium: Cambuur Stadion; Attendance: 7,355

6 October 2017 8th week	FC Emmen	2–0	SC Cambuur	Emmen
20:00	Cas Peters 30'; Omran Haydary 72'	Report		Stadium: De Oude Meerdijk; Attendance: 4,018

13 October 2017 9th week	SC Cambuur	1–3	TOP Oss	Leeuwarden
20:00	Daan Boerlage 47'	Report	Hüseyin Doğan 5'; Fatih Kamaçi 8'; Fisayo Adarabioyo 90+1'	Stadium: Cambuur Stadion; Attendance: 7,072

20 October 2017 10th week	Almere City FC	1–1	SC Cambuur	Almere
20:00	Dennis van der Heijden 86'	Report	Daan Boerlage 87'	Stadium: Yanmar Stadion; Attendance: 1,400

27 October 2017 11th week	SC Cambuur	0–1	Jong PSV	Leeuwarden
20:00		Report	Laros Duarte 57'	Stadium: Cambuur Stadion; Attendance: 7,245

3 November 2017 12th week	NEC Nijmegen	3–1	SC Cambuur	Nijmegen
20:00	Mohamed Rayhi 60' 68'; Steeven Langil 84'	Report	Kevin van Kippersluis 48'	Stadium: Goffertstadion; Attendance: 9,163

17 November 2017 13th week	SC Cambuur	1–0	Fortuna Sittard	Leeuwarden
20:00	Marvin Peersman 2'	Report		Stadium: Cambuur Stadion; Attendance: 7,094

24 November 2017 14th	SC Cambuur	2–2	FC Den Bosch	Leeuwarden
20:00	Kevin van Kippersluis 6'; Matthew Steenvoorden 59'	Report	Muhammed Mert 43'; Robbert Schilder 79' (o.g.)	Stadium: Cambuur Stadion; Attendance: 7,044

27 November 2017 15th week	FC Eindhoven	2–1	SC Cambuur	Eindhoven
20:00	Tibo Van de Velde 11'; Mart Lieder 90+3'	Report	Martijn Barto 54'	Stadium: Jan Louwers Stadion; Attendance: 1,335

1 December 2017 16th week	SC Cambuur	2–1	SC Telstar	Leeuwarden
20:00	Furdjel Narsingh 77'; Ricardo Kip 83' (pen.)	Report	Mohamed Hamdaoui 48'	Stadium: Cambuur Stadion; Attendance: 6,769

1 December 2017 17th week	SC Cambuur	3–0	FC Dordrecht	Leeuwarden
20:00	Issa Kallon 54'; Xander Houtkoop 60'; Ricardo Kip 80'	Report		Stadium: Cambuur Stadion; Attendance: 6,912

22 December 2017 18th week	Helmond Sport	3–0	SC Cambuur	Helmond
20:00	Jason Bourdouxhe 30'; Robert Braber 53'; Jordy Thomassen 90+5'	Report		Stadium: Stadion De Braak; Attendance: 1,163

==== 2nd half ====
12 January 2018 19th week	SC Cambuur	3–2	De Graafschap	Leeuwarden
20:00	Nigel Robertha 23' 50'; Xander Houtkoop 45+2'	Report	Sjoerd Ars 10'; Robbert Schilder 64' (o.g.)	Stadium: Cambuur Stadion; Attendance: 7,277

15 January 2018 20th week	Jong AZ	0–1	SC Cambuur	The Hague
20:00		Report	Xander Houtkoop 56'	Stadium: AFAS Trainingscomplex; Attendance: 290

22 January 2018 21st week	Jong Ajax	3–2	SC Cambuur	Duivendrecht
20:00	Mateo Casierra 11'; Noa Lang 17'; Carel Eiting 24'	Report	Nigel Robertha 63' 76'	Stadium: Sportpark De Toekomst; Attendance: 485

26 January 2018 22nd week	Jong Utrecht	1–3	SC Cambuur	Bunschoten
20:00	Nick Venema 56' (pen.)	Report	Nigel Robertha 26'; Martijn Barto 27'; Darren Rosheuvel 59'	Stadium: Sportpark De Westmaat; Attendance: 562

2 February 2018 23rd	SC Cambuur	2–1	Go Ahead Eagles	Leeuwarden
20:00	Martijn Barto 9' 18'	Report	Bruno Andrade 49'	Stadium: Cambuur Stadion; Attendance: 7,954

9 February 2018 24th week	SC Cambuur	0–2	MVV Maastricht	Leeuwarden
20:00		Report	Tuur Houben 81'; Samy Mmaee 89'	Stadium: Cambuur Stadion; Attendance: 7,476

16 February 2018 25th week	RKC Waalwijk	0–0	SC Cambuur	Waalwijk
20:00		Report		Stadium: Mandemakers Stadion; Attendance: 1,701

23 February 2018 26th week	SC Cambuur	1–1	FC Emmen	Leeuwarden
20:00	Alvin Daniels 25' (pen.)	Report	Cas Peters 71'	Stadium: Cambuur Stadion; Attendance: 7,476

2 March 2018 27th week	TOP Oss	2–1	SC Cambuur	Oss
20:00	Richard van der Venne 46'; Norichio Nieveld 87'	Report	Daan Boerlage 50'	Stadium: Frans Heesen Stadion; Attendance: 1,432

9 March 2018 28th week	SC Cambuur	2–1	Almere City FC	Leeuwarden
20:00	Martijn Barto 35'; Justin Mathieu 71'	Report	Silvester van der Water 33'	Stadium: Cambuur Stadion; Attendance: 7,036

12 March 2018 29th week	Jong PSV	1–1	SC Cambuur	Eindhoven
20:00	Cody Gakpo 29'	Report	Ricardo Kip 34'	Stadium: De Herdgang; Attendance: 321

16 March 2018 30th week	SC Cambuur	1–1	NEC Nijmegen	Leeuwarden
20:00	Jordy van Deelen 50'	Report	Anass Achahbar 42'	Stadium: Cambuur Stadion; Attendance: 7,262

23 March 2018 31st week	Fortuna Sittard	3–2	SC Cambuur	Sittard
20:00	Lisandro Semedo 11' 18' (pen.) 71' (pen.)	Report	Matthew Steenvoorden 5'; Ricardo Kip 9'	Stadium: Fortuna Sittard Stadion; Attendance: 3,520

30 March 2018 32nd week	SC Cambuur	2–2	FC Volendam	Leeuwarden
20:00	Xander Houtkoop 30'; Daniel Crowley 39'	Report	Rodney Antwi 31'; Anthony Berenstein 75'	Stadium: Cambuur Stadion; Attendance: 7,283

2 April 2018 33rd week	SC Cambuur	3–2	FC Eindhoven	Leeuwarden
14:30	Martijn Barto 48' 51'; Daniel Crowley 88'	Report	Mart Lieder 44' 80'	Stadium: Cambuur Stadion; Attendance: 7,796

6 April 2018 34th week	FC Den Bosch	1–2	SC Cambuur	Den Bosch
20:00	Jeremy Fernandes 85'	Report	Mathias Schils 46'; Kevin van Kippersluis 75'	Stadium: De Vliert; Attendance: 2,657

9 April 2018 35th week	SC Cambuur	3–2	Jong AZ	Leeuwarden
20:00	Kevin van Kippersluis 8' 37'; Justin Mathieu 89'	Report	Jamie Jacobs 34' 66'	Stadium: Cambuur Stadion; Attendance: 7,083

13 April 2018 36th week	FC Dordrecht	0–3	SC Cambuur	Dordrecht
20:00		Report	Daniel Crowley 12'; Martijn Barto 53' 78'	Stadium: Stadion Krommedijk; Attendance: 2,135

20 April 2018 37th week	SC Cambuur	4–1	Helmond Sport	Leeuwarden
20:00	Matthew Steenvoorden 50'; Justin Mathieu 63'; Kevin van Kippersluis 74'; Ricardo Kip 87'	Report	Robert Braber 58'	Stadium: Cambuur Stadion; Attendance: 8,233

28 April 2018 38th week	SC Telstar	0–1	SC Cambuur	Velsen-Zuid
19:45		Report		Stadium: BUKO Stadion

=== Promotion Play-offs ===
1 May 2018 Promotion play-off 1st round 1st match	FC Dordrecht	1-4	SC Cambuur	Dordrecht
20:45	Julius Bliek 63'	Report	Daniel Crowley 20'; Justin Mathieu 47'; Martijn Barto 71' 83'	Stadium: Stadion Krommedijk; Attendance: 2,412

5 May 2018 Promotion play-off 1st round 2nd match	SC Cambuur	1-4 (a.e.t.) (3-5 p)	FC Dordrecht	Leeuwarden
20:45	Issa Kallon 30'	Report	Jeremy Cijntje 48'; Jafar Arias 57'; Denis Mahmudov 71' (pen.) 73'	Stadium: Cambuur Stadion; Attendance: 7,542
	Penalties
	Daniel Crowley (penalty missed); Sai van Wermeskerken (penalty scored); Kevin van Kippersluis (penalty scored); Jordy van Deelen (penalty scored)		Denis Mahmudov (penalty scored); Antonio Stankov (penalty scored); Mawouna Amevor (penalty scored); Erol Alkan (penalty scored); Jafar Arias (penalty scored)

5–5 on aggregate. FC Dordrecht won 5–3 on penalties.

=== KNVB Cup ===
19 September 2017 1st round	Helmond Sport	1–5	SC Cambuur	Helmond
19:45	Gevero Markiet 68'	Report	Kevin van Kippersluis 11' 52'; Karim Rossi 78'; Issa Kallon 81'; Nigel Robertha 89'	Stadium: Stadion De Braak; Attendance: 1,245

24 October 2017 2nd round	FC Den Bosch	0–2	SC Cambuur	Den Bosch
19:45		Report	Marvin Peersman 77'; Kevin van Kippersluis 84'	Stadium: De Vliert; Attendance: 1,456

19 December 2017 Round of 16	SC Cambuur	3–0	GVVV	Leeuwarden
19:45	Nigel Robertha 59'; Matthew Steenvoorden 71'; Ricardo Kip 83' (pen.)	Report		Stadium: Cambuur Stadion; Attendance: 4,506

30 January 2018 Quarter final	FC Twente	3–1	SC Cambuur	Enschede
20:45	Oussama Assaidi 60' (pen.); Adam Maher 68' 76'	Report	Mathias Schils 33'	Stadium: De Grolsch Veste; Attendance: 22,600

== Statistics ==
=== Scorers ===
#	Player	Eerste Divisie	Promotion Play-offs	KNVB	Total
1	(Netherlands) Martijn Barto	12	2	0	14
2	(Netherlands) Kevin van Kippersluis	6	0	3	9
3	(Netherlands) Nigel Robertha	5	0	2	7
4	(Netherlands) Justin Mathieu	5	1	0	6
4	(Netherlands) Matthew Steenvoorden	5	0	1	6
4	(Netherlands) Ricardo Kip	5	0	1	6
7	(Netherlands) Xander Houtkoop	5	0	0	5
8	(England) Daniel Crowley	3	1	0	4
8	(Sierra Leone) Issa Kallon	3	1	0	4
10	(Netherlands) Daan Boerlage	3	0	0	3
11	(France) Alvin Daniels	2	0	0	2
11	(Switzerland) Karim Rossi	1	0	1	2
11	(Belgium) Mathias Schils	1	0	1	2
14	(Netherlands) Darren Rosheuvel	1	0	0	1
14	(Netherlands) Furdjel Narsingh	1	0	0	1
14	(Netherlands) Jordy van Deelen	1	0	0	1
14	(Netherlands) Marvin Peersman	0	0	1	1

=== Appearances ===
#	Player	Eerste Divisie	Promotion Play-offs	KNVB	Total
1	(Netherlands) Robbert Schilder	37	2	4	43
2	(Netherlands) Martijn Barto	35	2	3	40
3	(Netherlands) Matthew Steenvoorden	33	2	4	39
4	(Sierra Leone) Issa Kallon	31	1	3	35
4	(Netherlands) Kevin van Kippersluis	31	1	2	35
6	(Netherlands) Erik Cummins	29	2	3	34
6	(Netherlands) Justin Mathieu	29	2	3	34
8	(Japan) Sai van Wermeskerken	28	2	3	33
9	(Netherlands) Jordy van Deelen	28	2	2	32
9	(Belgium) Mathias Schils	28	1	3	32
11	(Netherlands) Xander Houtkoop	28	2	1	31
12	(France) Alvin Daniels	28	0	2	30
12	(Netherlands) Ricardo Kip	28	0	2	30
14	(Netherlands) Daan Boerlage	26	1	2	29
15	(Netherlands) Marvin Peersman	15	0	3	18
16	(England) Daniel Crowley	15	2	0	17
16	(Netherlands) Nigel Robertha	12	1	4	17
18	(Netherlands) Darren Rosheuvel	11	2	1	14
19	(Netherlands) Jurjan Mannes	10	1	1	12
20	(Netherlands) Furdjel Narsingh	8	1	2	11
21	(Netherlands) Bryan Smeets	7	0	3	10
21	(Netherlands) Jesse Bertrams	9	0	1	10
23	(Netherlands) Martijn van der Laan	7	0	2	9
24	(Netherlands) Omar El Baad	8	0	8	8
25	(Switzerland) Karim Rossi	4	0	1	5
26	(Netherlands) Cody Claver	2	0	0	2
27	(Netherlands) Kenny Teijsse	1	0	0	1

=== Clean sheets ===
#	Player	Eerste Divisie	KNVB	Total
1	(Netherlands) Erik Cummins	7	2	9
2	(Netherlands) Jesse Bertrams	1	0	1
Total		8	2	10

=== Disciplinary record ===
#	Player	Eerste Divisie		Promotion Play-offs		KNVB		Total	
#	Player	Booked	Sent off (straight red)	Booked	Sent off (straight red)	Booked	Sent off (straight red)	Booked	Sent off (straight red)
1	(Netherlands) Marvin Peersman	4	2	0	0	1	0	5	2
2	(Netherlands) Bryan Smeets	1	1	0	0	0	0	1	1
3	(Belgium) Mathias Schils	0	1	0	0	0	0	0	1
4	(Netherlands) Matthew Steenvoorden	12	0	0	0	0	0	12	0
5	(Netherlands) Daan Boerlage	5	0	0	0	0	0	5	0
5	(Netherlands) Kevin van Kippersluis	4	0	0	0	1	0	5	0
5	(Netherlands) Robbert Schilder	5	0	0	0	0	0	5	0
8	(England) Daniel Crowley	3	0	0	0	0	0	3	0
8	(Sierra Leone) Issa Kallon	3	0	0	0	0	0	3	0
8	(Netherlands) Justin Mathieu	2	0	0	0	1	0	3	0
8	(Netherlands) Martijn Barto	3	0	0	0	0	0	3	0
8	(Netherlands) Xander Houtkoop	2	0	1	0	0	0	3	0
13	(Netherlands) Martijn van der Laan	2	0	0	0	0	0	2	0
13	(Netherlands) Omar El Baad	2	0	0	0	0	0	2	0
15	(France) Alvin Daniels	1	0	0	0	0	0	1	0
15	(Netherlands) Erik Cummins	1	0	0	0	0	0	1	0
15	(Sierra Leone) Issa Kallon	1	0	0	0	0	0	1	0
15	(Netherlands) Jurjan Mannes	1	0	0	0	0	0	1	0
15	(Netherlands) Justin Mathieu	1	0	0	0	0	0	1	0
15	(Switzerland) Karim Rossi	1	0	0	0	0	0	1	0
15	(Japan) Sai van Wermeskerken	1	0	0	0	0	0	1	0
