= 2016–17 SC Cambuur season =

Dutch football club season

SC Cambuur
2016–17 season
- Stadium: Kooi Stadion
- Eerste Divisie: 3rd
- KNVB Cup: Semi-final
- Top goalscorer: League: Sander van de Streek (23 goals); All: Sander van de Streek (23 goals)
- Highest home attendance: 9,640 (Promotion Play-offs semi-final 2nd match)
- Lowest home attendance: 6,872 (8th week)
- Average home league attendance: 7,691
- Biggest win: 7-2 TOP Oss (a) 30th week 5-0 RKC Waalwijk (h) 36th week
- Biggest defeat: 3-0 (Fortuna Sittard (h) 7th week De Graafschap (h) 24th week)
- All statistics correct as of 24 November 2025.

The 2016–17 season was SC Cambuur's 45th season in the Eerste Divisie (1st consecutive).

SC Cambuur finished the regular season in 3rd place, eliminated in the semi-finals of the promotion play-offs after losing with an aggregate score 3–2 against MVV Maastricht.

The club also competed in the KNVB Cup, where their campaign ended in the semi-final following a 3–2 penalty loss to AZ Alkmaar.

Sander van de Streek was the top scorer of the club in this season with 23 goals; 22 goals in Eerste Divisie and 1 goal in the Promotion Play-offs.

Martijn Barto was the most appeared player in this season with 45 appearances; 38 appearances in the Eerste Divisie, 2 appearances in the Promotion Play-offs and 5 appearances in the KNVB Cup.

== Players ==
=== First-team squad ===
Note: Flags indicate national team as defined under FIFA eligibility rules; some limited exceptions apply. Players may hold more than one non-FIFA nationality.

No.	Pos.	Nation	Player
2	MF	NED	Jordy van Deelen
3	DF	BEL	Chiro N'Toko
4	DF	NED	Matthew Steenvoorden
5	DF	NED	Gino Bosz
6	FW	NED	Erik Bakker
7	FW	GHA	Raymond Gyasi
8	MF	NED	Ninos Gouriye
8	FW	IDN	Stefano Lilipaly
9	FW	NED	Martijn Barto
10	MF	NED	Ricardo Kip
11	FW	MAR	Tarik Tissoudali
12	MF	NED	Xander Houtkoop
14	MF	CPV	Jamiro Monteiro
15	MF	NED	Jergé Hoefdraad
16	DF	SUR	Djavan Anderson

No.	Pos.	Nation	Player
17	DF	NED	Danny Bakker
18	MF	NED	Noureddine Boutzamar
20	MF	NED	Sander van de Streek
21	DF	NED	Robbert Schilder
22	GK	NED	Leonard Nienhuis
23	DF	NED	Marvin Peersman
24	MF	AFG	Farshad Noor
25	MF	NED	Jurjan Mannes
26	GK	NED	Harm Zeinstra
30	FW	NED	Michiel Hemmen
33	DF	SUR	Delvechio Blackson
36	MF	NED	Daan Boerlage
39	FW	SUR	Tyrone Conraad
41	DF	NED	Omar El Baad
45	MF	NED	Achraf Akhamrane

== Transfers ==
=== In ===
Pos.	Player	Transferred from	Fee	Date
DF	(Belgium) Chiro N'Toko	(Netherlands) FC Eindhoven		1 July 2016
DF	(Netherlands) Gino Bosz	(Netherlands) Heracles Almelo	Free	1 July 2016
FW	(Netherlands) Jordy van Deelen	(Netherlands) FC Emmen	Free	1 July 2016
DF	(Netherlands) Matthew Steenvoorden	(Netherlands) FC Dordrecht	Free	1 July 2016
MF	(Netherlands) Ninos Gouriye	No club	Free	1 July 2016
FW	(Ghana) Raymond Gyasi	(Netherlands) Jong AZ	Free	1 July 2016
FW	(Netherlands) Michiel Hemmen	(Netherlands) Excelsior Rotterdam	Free	22 July 2016
DF	(Netherlands) Robbert Schilder	(Netherlands) FC Twente	Free	29 August 2016
MF	(Netherlands) Ricardo Kip	(England) Fleetwood Town F.C.	On loan	31 August 2016
FW	(Morocco) Tarik Tissoudali	(France) Le Havre AC	On loan	6 January 2017
MF	(Afghanistan) Farshad Noor	(Netherlands) Roda JC Kerkrade	On loan	19 January 2017
FW	(Indonesia) Stefano Lilipaly	(Netherlands) SC Telstar		24 January 2017
MF	(Netherlands) Jurjan Mannes	(Netherlands) FC Emmen	On loan	30 January 2017

=== Out ===
Pos.	Player	Transferred to	Fee	Date
MF	(Netherlands) Gino Bosz	No club		23 January 2017
FW	(Netherlands) Ninos Gouriye	(Denmark) Vendsyssel FF	Free	24 January 2017
FW	(Ghana) Raymond Gyasi	(Norway) Stabæk Fotball		21 March 2017

== Competitions ==
=== Overall record ===
Competition	First match	Last match	Starting round	Final position	Record							
Competition	First match	Last match	Starting round	Final position	Pld	W	D	L	GF	GA	GD	Win %
Eerste Divisie	5 August 2016	5 May 2017	Week 1	3rd	38	22	5	11	78	42	+36	57.89
Promotion play-offs	18 May 2017	21 May 2017	Semi-final	Semi-final	2	1	0	1	2	3	−1	50.00
KNVB Cup	20 September 2016	2 March 2017	1st round	Semi-final	5	3	2	0	9	3	+6	60.00
Total					45	26	7	12	89	48	+41	57.78

Source: ESPN

=== Eerste Divisie ===
==== League table ====
Pos	Team	Pld	W	D	L	GF	GA	GD	Pts	Promotion, qualification or relegation
1	VVV-Venlo (C, P)	38	25	5	8	75	35	+40	80	Promotion to the Eredivisie
2	Jong Ajax (Note: Reserves teams cannot be promoted and cannot participate in the promotion play-offs.)	38	23	7	8	93	54	+39	76	
3	Cambuur	38	22	5	11	78	42	+36	71	Qualification to promotion play-offs Second round (Note: Ten teams, two from the Eredivisie and eight from the Eerste Divisie, play for two spots in the 2017–18 Eredivisie, the remaining eight teams play in the 2017–18 Eerste Divisie. The season is subdivided in periods consisting of games 1–9, 10–18, 19–27 and 28–36. The top finisher in each period (that has not won a previous period) is a period winner and qualifies for the promotion play-offs first round even if they finish the season outside of the top nine.)
4	Jong PSV	38	20	9	9	66	35	+31	69	
5	NAC Breda (O, P)	38	19	7	12	65	50	+15	64	Qualification to promotion play-offs Second round
6	Volendam	38	17	11	10	63	44	+19	62	Qualification to promotion play-offs Second round
7	MVV	38	15	14	9	55	45	+10	59	Qualification to promotion play-offs Second round
8	Almere City	38	17	8	13	74	66	+8	59	Qualification to promotion play-offs First round
9	Emmen	38	14	13	11	50	40	+10	55	Qualification to promotion play-offs First round
10	RKC Waalwijk	38	15	9	14	62	70	−8	54	Qualification to promotion play-offs First round
11	Eindhoven	38	15	8	15	64	71	−7	53	
12	De Graafschap	38	15	5	18	70	63	+7	50	
13	Helmond Sport	38	14	7	17	51	67	−16	49	Qualification to promotion play-offs First round
14	Den Bosch	38	12	9	17	48	67	−19	45	
15	Oss	38	12	5	21	67	95	−28	41	
16	Telstar	38	10	10	18	46	64	−18	40	
17	Fortuna Sittard (Note: Fortuna Sittard were deducted three points for an outstanding bill owed to KNVB. On 10 April 2017 Fortuna Sittard were deducted another 6 points for not meeting financial targets.)	38	13	9	16	54	67	−13	39	
18	Jong FC Utrecht	38	10	7	21	50	71	−21	37	
19	Dordrecht	38	5	9	24	42	72	−30	24	
20	Achilles '29 (Note: Achilles '29 were deducted three points for repeatedly not meeting financial requirements.) (R)	38	5	7	26	37	92	−55	19	Relegation to the Tweede Divisie

Source: NUsport (in Dutch), Soccerway
Rules for classification: 1) points; 2) goal difference; 3) number of goals scored
(C) Champions; (O) Play-off winners; (P) Promoted; (R) Relegated

==== Results summary ====
Overall								Home						Away					
Pld	W	D	L	GF	GA	GD	Pts	W	D	L	GF	GA	GD	W	D	L	GF	GA	GD
38	22	5	11	78	42	+36	71	13	3	3	49	19	+30	9	2	8	29	23	+6

Source: https://www.espn.nl/voetbal/team/scorebord/_/id/3736/season/2016

==== Results by round ====
Round	1	2	3	4	5	6	7	8	9	10	11	12	13	14	15	16	17	18	19	20	21	22	23	24	25	26	27	28	29	30	31	32	33	34	35	36	37	38
Ground	A	H	A	A	H	H	A	H	A	A	H	A	H	A	H	A	H	H	A	H	A	H	H	A	H	A	H	A	H	A	A	H	A	H	A	H	H	A
Result	L	D	W	D	L	W	L	W	L	L	W	L	W	W	W	W	L	W	D	L	W	W	W	L	D	W	W	W	L	W	D	W	W	W	W	W	W	L
Position																																						3

Source: ESPN
A = Away; H = Home; W = Win; D = Draw; L = Loss

=== Matches ===
==== 1st half ====
5 August 2016 1st week	VVV-Venlo	2-1	SC Cambuur	Venlo
20:00	Vito van Crooij 30'; Ralf Seuntjens 82'	Report	Sander van de Streek 26'	Stadium: De Koel; Attendance: 4,422

12 August 2016 2nd week	SC Cambuur	1-1	Jong PSV	Leeuwarden
20:00	Erik Bakker 90+1'	Report	Sam Lammers 60'	Stadium: Cambuur Stadion; Attendance: 7,042

19 August 2016 3rd week	FC Dordrecht	0-1	SC Cambuur	Dordrecht
20:00		Report	Sander van de Streek 74'	Stadium: Stadion Krommedijk; Attendance: 1,742

22 August 2016 4th week	SC Cambuur	1-1	De Graafschap	Leeuwarden
20:00	Jergé Hoefdraad 30'	Report	Piotr Parzyszek 79'	Stadium: Cambuur Stadion; Attendance: 7,206

26 August 2016 5th week	Helmond Sport	1-0	SC Cambuur	Helmond
20:00	Marc Höcher 35'	Report		Stadium: Stadion De Braak; Attendance: 1,331

9 September 2016 6th week	SC Cambuur	4-1	Almere City FC	Leeuwarden
20:00	Djavan Anderson 63'; Jergé Hoefdraad 81'; Martijn Barto 89'; Erik Bakker 90+3'	Report	Yener Arica 84'	Stadium: Cambuur Stadion; Attendance: 7,032

16 September 2016 7th week	Fortuna Sittard	3-0	SC Cambuur	Sittard
20:00	Kamen Hadzhiev 15'; Roald van Hout 40'; Driess Saddiki 90+2'	Report		Stadium: Fortuna Sittard Stadion; Attendance: 1,837

23 September 2016 8th week	SC Cambuur	3-1	Achilles '29	Leeuwarden
20:00	Erik Bakker 62' (pen.); Ricardo Kip 82'; Ninos Gouriye 88'	Report	Kürşad Sürmeli 79'	Stadium: Cambuur Stadion; Attendance: 6,872

30 September 2016 9th week	MVV Maastricht	2-1	SC Cambuur	Maastricht
20:00	Joeri Schroyen 54'; Dyon Gijzen 89'	Report	Ricardo Kip 36'	Stadium: De Geusselt; Attendance: 4,427

14 October 2016 10th week	FC Den Bosch	3-1	SC Cambuur	Den Bosch
20:00	Arda Havar 71'; Ben Santermans 79'; Stefano Beltrame 88'	Report	Xander Houtkoop 61'	Stadium: De Vliert; Attendance: 2,479

21 October 2016 11th week	SC Cambuur	4-2	TOP Oss	Leeuwarden
20:00	Sander van de Streek 6' 37' 86'; Erik Bakker 63'	Report	Tom Boere 23' 32'	Stadium: Cambuur Stadion; Attendance: 7,021

30 October 2016 12th week	FC Eindhoven	2-0	SC Cambuur	Eindhoven
14:30	Sebastiaan De Wilde 44'; Dario Van den Buijs 66' (pen.)	Report		Stadium: Jan Louwers Stadion; Attendance: 2,100

4 November 2016 13th week	SC Cambuur	2-1	FC Volendam	Leeuwarden
20:00	Sander van de Streek 72'; Martijn Barto 90+3'	Report	Kevin van Kippersluis 16'	Stadium: Cambuur Stadion; Attendance: 7,250

18 November 2016 14th week	FC Emmen	0-1	SC Cambuur	Emmen
20:00		Report	Gino Bosz 84'	Stadium: De Oude Meerdijk; Attendance: 3,710

25 November 2016 15th week	SC Cambuur	3-1	NAC Breda	Leeuwarden
20:00	Sander van de Streek 17' 70'; Jamiro Monteiro 74'	Report	David Faupala 39'	Stadium: Cambuur Stadion; Attendance: 7,258

28 November 2016 16th week	SC Telstar	0-3	SC Cambuur	Velsen-Zuid
20:00		Report	Jamiro Monteiro 38'; Martijn Barto 57'; Sander van de Streek 89'	Stadium: BUKO Stadion; Attendance: 1,563

2 December 2016 17th week	SC Cambuur	1-3	Jong Ajax	Leeuwarden
20:00	Jergé Hoefdraad 62'	Report	Frenkie de Jong 81'; Pelle Clement 82'; Justin Kluivert 90+2'	Stadium: Cambuur Stadion; Attendance: 8,321

9 December 2016 18th week	SC Cambuur	4-2	Jong Utrecht	Leeuwarden
20:00	Martijn Barto 13' 76'; Sander van de Streek 34'; Erik Bakker 78' (pen.)	Report	Myenty Abena 54'; Gyrano Kerk 62'	Stadium: Cambuur Stadion; Attendance: 7,084

18 December 2016 19th week	RKC Waalwijk	2-2	SC Cambuur	Waalwijk
14:30	Pieter Langedijk 25' (pen.); Johan Voskamp 51'	Report	Martijn Barto 28'; Sander van de Streek 69'	Stadium: Mandemakers Stadion; Attendance: 1,800

==== 2nd half ====
13 January 2017 20th week	SC Cambuur	0-2	VVV-Venlo	Leeuwarden
20:00		Report	Johnatan Opoku 37'; Nils Roseler 45+2'	Stadium: Cambuur Stadion; Attendance: 7,420

21 January 2017 21st week	Jong PSV	0-2	SC Cambuur	Eindhoven
19:45		Report	Sander van de Streek 1'; Tarik Tissoudali 68'	Stadium: De Herdgang; Attendance: 419

28 January 2017 22nd week	SC Cambuur	3-0	FC Dordrecht	Leeuwarden
19:45	Tarik Tissoudali 3'; Jergé Hoefdraad 7'; Erik Bakker 29' (pen.)	Report		Stadium: Cambuur Stadion; Attendance: 7,197

3 February 2017 23rd week	SC Cambuur	3-0	Helmond Sport	Leeuwarden
20:00	Jordy van Deelen 3'; Stefano Lilipaly 64'; Jamiro Monteiro 89'	Report		Stadium: Cambuur Stadion; Attendance: 8,083

6 February 2017 24th week	De Graafschap	3-0	SC Cambuur	Doetinchem
20:00	Anthony van den Hurk 54'; Youssef El Jebli 80'; Bart Straalman 90+3'	Report		Stadium: De Vijverberg; Attendance: 8,064

10 February 2017 25th week	SC Cambuur	1-1	Fortuna Sittard	Leeuwarden
20:00	Martijn Barto 55'	Report	Finn Stokkers 20'	Stadium: Cambuur Stadion; Attendance: 7,133

17 February 2017 26th week	Almere City FC	0-1	SC Cambuur	Almere
20:00		Report	Tarik Tissoudali 59'	Stadium: Yanmar Stadion; Attendance: 1,807

24 February 2017 27th week	SC Cambuur	4-0	MVV Maastricht	Leeuwarden
20:00	Sander van de Streek 31'; Jamiro Monteiro 38'; Martijn Barto 56'; Stefano Lilipaly 77'	Report		Stadium: Cambuur Stadion; Attendance: 7,511

5 March 2017 28th week	Achilles '29	0-3	SC Cambuur	Groesbeek
14:30		Report	Martijn Barto 6' 56'; Stefano Lilipaly 81'	Stadium: Sportpark de Heikant; Attendance: 1,185

10 March 2017 29th week	SC Cambuur	0-1	FC Den Bosch	Leeuwarden
20:00		Report	Niek Vossebelt 7'	Stadium: Cambuur Stadion; Attendance: 7,368

13 March 2017 30th week	TOP Oss	2-7	SC Cambuur	Oss
20:00	Cihat Celik 4'; Justin Mathieu 42'	Report	Sander van de Streek 19' 32' 56'; Jordy van Deelen 59'; Stefano Lilipaly 74' 88'; Martijn Barto 90'	Stadium: Frans Heesen Stadion; Attendance: 921

19 March 2017 31st week	FC Volendam	1-1	SC Cambuur	Volendam
14:30	Sander van de Streek 9'	Report	Kevin van Kippersluis 34'	Stadium: Kras Stadion; Attendance: 5,269

31 March 2017 32nd week	SC Cambuur	1-0	FC Emmen	Leeuwarden
20:00	Martijn Barto 73'	Report		Stadium: Cambuur Stadion; Attendance: 7,735

7 April 2017 33rd week	NAC Breda	0-2	SC Cambuur	Breda
20:00		Report	Sander van de Streek 31'; Stefano Lilipaly 87'	Stadium: Rat Verlegh Stadion; Attendance: 14,285

14 April 2017 34th week	SC Cambuur	5-1	SC Telstar	Leeuwarden
20:00	Sander van de Streek 8'; Tarik Tissoudali 44'; Erik Bakker 53' (pen.); Xander Houtkoop 80'; Martijn Barto 90+2'	Report	Naoyuki Yamazaki 89'	Stadium: Cambuur Stadion; Attendance: 7,610

17 April 2017 35th week	Jong Utrecht	0-2	SC Cambuur	Utrecht
14:30		Report	Sander van de Streek 22'; Tarik Tissoudali 89'	Stadium: Stadion Galgenwaard; Attendance: 791

21 April 2017 36th week	SC Cambuur	5-0	RKC Waalwijk	Leeuwarden
20:00	Sander van de Streek 20'; Tarik Tissoudali 22' 24'; Stefano Lilipaly 35'; Erik Bakker 43'	Report		Stadium: Cambuur Stadion; Attendance: 9,142

28 April 2017 37th week	SC Cambuur	4-1	FC Eindhoven	Leeuwarden
20:00	Jergé Hoefdraad 8'; Erik Bakker 19' (pen.); Sander van de Streek 41'; Stefano Lilipaly 51'	Report	Mart Lieder 46'	Stadium: Cambuur Stadion; Attendance: 8,388

5 May 2017 38th week	Jong Ajax	2-1	SC Cambuur	Duivendrecht
20:00	Carel Eiting 31'; Mateo Casierra 41'	Report	Erik Bakker 88' (pen.)	Stadium: Sportpark De Toekomst; Attendance: 616

=== Promotion Play-offs ===
18 May 2017 Promotion play-off 2nd round 1st match	MVV Maastricht	1-1	SC Cambuur	Maastricht
19:45	Kelechi Nwakali 8'	Report	Sander van de Streek 17'	Stadium: De Geusselt; Attendance: 5,642

21 May 2017 Promotion play-off 2nd round 2nd match	SC Cambuur	1-2	MVV Maastricht	Leeuwarden
14:30	Martijn Barto 58'	Report	Steven Pereira 80'; Thomas Verheydt 90+3'	Stadium: Cambuur Stadion; Attendance: 9,640

MVV Maastricht won 3–2 on aggregate.

=== KNVB Cup ===
20 September 2016 1st round	FC Rijnvogels	0-1	SC Cambuur	Katwijk
17:00		Report	Martijn Barto 89'	Stadium: Sportpark De Kooltuin; Attendance: 550

25 October 2016 2nd round	SV TEC	0-4	SC Cambuur	Tiel
20:00		Report	Jamiro Monteiro 5' 90'; Jordy van Deelen 29' 43'	Stadium: Sportpark De Lok; Attendance: 1,100

15 December 2016 3rd round	SC Cambuur	2-1	AFC Ajax	Leeuwarden
18:30	Martijn Barto 20' 39'	Report	Pelle Clement 67'	Stadium: Cambuur Stadion; Attendance: 9,203

25 January 2017 Quarter final	FC Utrecht	2-2 (a.e.t.) (7–6 p)	SC Cambuur	Utrecht
18:30	Ramon Leeuwin 29'; Giovanni Troupée 89'	Report	Erik Bakker 47' (pen.); Martijn Barto 67'	Stadium: Stadion Galgenwaard; Attendance: 13,997
	Penalties
	Nacer Barazite (penalty scored); Zakaria Labyad (penalty scored); Ramon Leeuwin (penalty missed); Willem Janssen (penalty missed); Sébastien Haller (penalty scored); Jeff Hardeveld (penalty scored); Sofyan Amrabat (penalty scored); Giovanni Troupée (penalty scored); Kristoffer Peterson (penalty missed)		Erik Bakker (penalty scored); Robbert Schilder (penalty scored); Xander Houtkoop (penalty missed); Jergé Hoefdraad (penalty scored); Farshad Noor (penalty missed); Marvin Peersman (penalty scored); Martijn Barto (penalty scored); Stefano Lilipaly (penalty scored); Jamiro Monteiro (penalty scored)

2 March 2017 Semi final	AZ	0-0 (a.e.t.) (3–2 p)	SC Cambuur	Alkmaar
20:45		Report	Erik Bakker 47' (pen.); Martijn Barto 67'	Stadium: AFAS Stadion; Attendance: 14,239
	Penalties
	Stijn Wuytens (penalty scored); Alireza Jahanbakhsh (penalty missed); Mattias Johansson (penalty missed); Derrick Luckassen (penalty scored); Wout Weghorst (penalty scored)		Erik Bakker (penalty scored); Robbert Schilder (penalty missed); Sander van de Streek (penalty scored); Jurjan Mannes (penalty missed); Martijn Barto (penalty missed)

== Statistics ==
=== Scorers ===
#	Player	Eerste Divisie	Promotion Play-offs	KNVB	Total
1	(Netherlands) Sander van de Streek	22	1	0	23
2	(Netherlands) Martijn Barto	13	1	4	18
3	(Netherlands) Erik Bakker	10	0	1	11
4	(Indonesia) Stefano Lilipaly	8	0	0	8
5	(Morocco) Tarik Tissoudali	7	0	0	7
6	(Cape Verde) Jamiro Monteiro	4	0	2	6
7	(Netherlands) Jergé Hoefdraad	5	0	0	5
8	(Netherlands) Jordy van Deelen	2	0	2	4
9	(Netherlands) Xander Houtkoop	2	0	0	2
10	(Suriname) Djavan Anderson	1	0	0	1
10	(Netherlands) Gino Bosz	1	0	0	1
10	(Netherlands) Ninos Gouriye	1	0	0	1
10	(Netherlands) Ricardo Kip	1	0	0	1

=== Appearances ===
#	Player	Eerste Divisie	Promotion Play-offs	KNVB	Total
1	(Netherlands) Martijn Barto	38	2	5	45
2	(Netherlands) Erik Bakker	37	2	5	44
3	(Cape Verde) Jamiro Monteiro	36	2	5	43
4	(Netherlands) Jergé Hoefdraad	35	2	5	42
4	(Netherlands) Marvin Peersman	35	2	5	42
6	(Netherlands) Sander van de Streek	33	2	4	39
7	(Netherlands) Robbert Schilder	26	2	4	32
8	(Netherlands) Harm Zeinstra	28	2	1	31
9	(Netherlands) Xander Houtkoop	24	1	4	29
10	(Netherlands) Jordy van Deelen	23	2	3	28
11	(Netherlands) Matthew Steenvoorden	22	2	1	25
12	(Morocco) Tarik Tissoudali	18	2	2	22
13	(Netherlands) Omar El Baad	19	0	2	21
13	(Indonesia) Stefano Lilipaly	17	2	2	21
15	(Suriname) Djavan Anderson	17	0	2	19
16	(Suriname) Delvechio Blackson	10	1	4	15
16	(Netherlands) Leonard Nienhuis	11	0	4	15
16	(Netherlands) Ricardo Kip	12	1	2	15
19	(Belgium) Chiro N'Toko	13	0	1	14
19	(Ghana) Raymond Gyasi	13	0	1	14
21	(Netherlands) Jurjan Mannes	11	1	1	13
22	(Netherlands) Michiel Hemmen	10	0	0	10
22	(Netherlands) Ninos Gouriye	9	0	1	10
24	(Netherlands) Gino Bosz	7	0	1	8
25	(Suriname) Tyrone Conraad	6	0	0	6
26	(Netherlands) Danny Bakker	4	0	1	5
27	(Netherlands) Daan Boerlage	3	0	0	3
28	(Afghanistan) Farshad Noor	1	0	1	2
28	(Netherlands) Noureddine Boutzamar	2	0	0	2
30	(Netherlands) Achraf Akhamrane	1	0	0	1

=== Clean sheets ===
#	Player	Eerste Divisie	KNVB	Total
1	(Netherlands) Harm Zeinstra	11	1	12
2	(Netherlands) Leonard Nienhuis	1	2	3
Total		12	3	15

=== Disciplinary record ===
#	Player	Eerste Divisie		Promotion Play-offs		KNVB		Total	
#	Player	Booked	Sent off (straight red)	Booked	Sent off (straight red)	Booked	Sent off (straight red)	Booked	Sent off (straight red)
1	(Netherlands) Marvin Peersman	7	1	1	0	0	0	8	1
2	(Netherlands) Erik Bakker	8	0	0	0	1	0	9	0
3	(Cape Verde) Jamiro Monteiro	6	0	0	0	0	0	6	0
3	(Netherlands) Sander van de Streek	4	0	1	0	1	0	6	0
5	(Netherlands) Matthew Steenvoorden	5	0	0	0	0	0	5	0
5	(Netherlands) Omar El Baad	3	0	0	0	2	0	5	0
7	(Netherlands) Jordy van Deelen	3	0	0	0	1	0	4	0
8	(Belgium) Chiro N'Toko	3	0	0	0	0	0	3	0
8	(Morocco) Tarik Tissoudali	1	0	1	0	1	0	3	0
10	(Suriname) Djavan Anderson	2	0	0	0	0	0	2	0
10	(Netherlands) Gino Bosz	2	0	0	0	0	0	2	0
10	(Netherlands) Jergé Hoefdraad	2	0	0	0	0	0	2	0
10	(Netherlands) Martijn Barto	2	0	0	0	0	0	2	0
14	(Suriname) Delvechio Blackson	0	0	0	0	1	0	1	0
14	(Netherlands) Leonard Nienhuis	1	0	0	0	0	0	1	0
14	(Netherlands) Michiel Hemmen	1	0	0	0	0	0	1	0
14	(Ghana) Raymond Gyasi	1	0	0	0	0	0	1	0
14	(Netherlands) Robbert Schilder	0	0	0	0	1	0	1	0
14	(Netherlands) Xander Houtkoop	1	0	0	0	0	0	1	0
14	(Netherlands) Harm Zeinstra	1	0	0	0	0	0	1	0
