= List of SC Cambuur seasons =

This is a list of the seasons played by SC Cambuur from 1964.

== Summary of SC Cambuur seasons ==
=== 1960s ===
Founded in June 1964 after taking over vv Leeuwarden’s professional license, SC Cambuur began in the Tweede Divisie. In the 1964–65 season they won the Tweede Divisie title and earned promotion to the Eerste Divisie. They spent the remainder of the decade establishing themselves in the Eerste Divisie, without notable cup achievements in available records.

=== 1970s ===
SC Cambuur remained in the Eerste Divisie throughout the 1970s. They began to challenge for promotion by finishing high enough to qualify for promotion play‑offs, but did not secure elevation to the Eredivisie during this decade.

=== 1980s ===
Continued as consistent Eerste Divisie competitors. They reached the promotion play‑offs a few times (e.g. 1980, 1983, 1987) but failed to clinch promotion in those seasons. There was no Eredivisie membership yet.

=== 1990s ===
- 1991–92: SC Cambuur won the Eerste Divisie title, earning promotion to the Eredivisie for the first time in club history.
- 1992–93: Debut Eredivisie season; in 1993–94 they were relegated back to the Eerste Divisie.
- 1997–98: Returned to the Eredivisie, but were relegated again after the 1999–2000 season.

=== 2000s ===
The early 2000s were turbulent. SC Cambuur often narrowly missed promotion—most famously in 2009, losing in play‑offs on penalties, and finishing second in 2010 but still missing out. The club narrowly avoided bankruptcy in 2005 and began restructuring from 2006 onward. They remained in the Eerste Divisie the entire decade.

=== 2010s ===
- 2012–13: Won the Eerste Divisie title and secured promotion to the Eredivisie.
- 2013–14 to 2015–16: Spent three seasons in the top flight, relegated after the 2015–16 season

Returned to the Eerste Divisie, with no further Eredivisie membership in the remainder of the decade.

=== 2020s ===
- 2020–21: Declared champions of the Eerste Divisie and promoted to the Eredivisie.
- 2021–22: Achieved 9th place, the best ever Eredivisie finish in the club’s history.
- 2022–23: Relegated after two seasons back in the Eredivisie (finished 17th and dropped down).
- 2024–25: In the Eerste Divisie, finished 3rd and reached promotion play‑offs, but were eliminated in the first round by FC Den Bosch.

== Seasons ==
Key to KNVB Cup rounds:

- 1R – First round
- 2R – Second round
- 3R – Third round
- GS – Group stage
- KO – Knock-out stage
- QF – Quarter-final
- R16 – 1/8 Final (round of 16)
- R32 – 1/16 Final (round of 32)
- SF – Semi-final

Seasons of SC Cambuur
| # | Season | League | | | | | KNVB Cup | Top scorer(s) | |
| # | Season | Division | Total | Consecutive | Pts | Pos | KNVB Cup | Player(s) | Goals |
|---|---|---|---|---|---|---|---|---|---|
| 1 | 1964–65 | Tweede Divisie Group A | 1st | 1st | 44 | 1st (Note: Promoted to Eerste Divisie via championship play-off.) | 1R | — | — |
| 2 | 1965–66 | Eerste Divisie | 1st | 1st | 25 | 9th | GS | — | — |
| 3 | 1966–67 | Eerste Divisie | 2nd | 2nd | 47 | 4th | — | — | — |
| 4 | 1967–68 | Eerste Divisie | 3rd | 3rd | 38 | 9th | — | — | — |
| 5 | 1968–69 | Eerste Divisie | 4th | 4th | 41 | 4th | 1R | — | — |
| 6 | 1969–70 | Eerste Divisie | 5th | 5th | 32 | 8th | 1R | — | — |
| 7 | 1970–71 | Eerste Divisie | 6th | 6th | 36 | 4th | R16 | — | — |
| 8 | 1971–72 | Eerste Divisie | 7th | 7th | 42 | 8th | — | — | — |
| 9 | 1972–73 | Eerste Divisie | 8th | 8th | 44 | 7th | 1R | — | — |
| 10 | 1973–74 | Eerste Divisie | 9th | 9th | 38 | 11th | 1R | — | — |
| 11 | 1974–75 | Eerste Divisie | 10th | 10th | 30 | 13th | 2R | — | — |
| 12 | 1975–76 | Eerste Divisie | 11th | 11th | 34 | 11th | 1R | — | — |
| 13 | 1976–77 | Eerste Divisie | 12th | 12th | 35 | 10th | 1R | — | — |
| 14 | 1977–78 | Eerste Divisie | 13th | 13th | 36 | 12th | 2R | — | — |
| 15 | 1978–79 | Eerste Divisie | 14th | 14th | 28 | 15th | 1R | — | — |
| 16 | 1979–80 | Eerste Divisie | 15th | 15th | 42 | 5th | 2R | — | — |
| 17 | 1980–81 | Eerste Divisie | 16th | 16th | 36 | 9th | 1R | — | — |
| 18 | 1981–82 | Eerste Divisie | 17th | 17th | 29 | 11th | 2R | — | — |
| 19 | 1982–83 | Eerste Divisie | 18th | 18th | 36 | 5th | 2R | — | — |
| 20 | 1983–84 | Eerste Divisie | 19th | 19th | 38 | 4th | 1R | — | — |
| 21 | 1984–85 | Eerste Divisie | 20th | 20th | 33 | 9th | 2R | — | — |
| 22 | 1985–86 | Eerste Divisie | 21st | 21st | 19 | 19th | 1R | — | — |
| 23 | 1986–87 | Eerste Divisie | 22nd | 22nd | 47 | 3rd | 1R | — | — |
| 24 | 1987–88 | Eerste Divisie | 23rd | 23rd | 34 | 11th | 2R | — | — |
| 25 | 1988–89 | Eerste Divisie | 24th | 24th | 34 | 11th | 1R | — | — |
| 26 | 1989–90 | Eerste Divisie | 25th | 25th | 34 | 11th | 1R | — | — |
| 27 | 1990–91 | Eerste Divisie | 26th | 26th | 37 | 11th | 1R | — | — |
| 28 | 1991–92 | Eerste Divisie | 27th | 27th | 53 | 1st (Note: Promoted to Eredivisie.) | 3R | — | — |
| 29 | 1992–93 | Eredivisie | 1st | 1st | 25 | 14th | 3R | — | — |
| 30 | 1993–94 | Eredivisie | 2nd | 2nd | 19 | 18th (Note: Relegated to Eerste Divisie.) | 2R | — | — |
| 31 | 1994–95 | Eerste Divisie | 28th | 1st | 39 | 7th | R32 | — | — |
| 32 | 1995–96 | Eerste Divisie | 29th | 2nd | 57 | 6th | QF | — | — |
| 33 | 1996–97 | Eerste Divisie | 30th | 3rd | 67 | 2nd | R32 | — | — |
| 34 | 1997–98 | Eerste Divisie | 31st | 4th | 65 | 2nd (Note: Promoted to Eredivisie via play-offs.) | R32 | — | — |
| 35 | 1998–99 | Eredivisie | 3rd | 1st | 32 | 15th | R16 | — | — |
| 36 | 1999–00 | Eredivisie | 4th | 2nd | 25 | 17th (Note: Relegated to Eerste Divisie via play-offs.) | KO | — | — |
| 37 | 2000–01 | Eerste Divisie | 32nd | 1st | 54 | 4th | KO | — | — |
| 38 | 2001–02 | Eerste Divisie | 33rd | 2nd | 51 | 7th | KO | — | — |
| 39 | 2002–03 | Eerste Divisie | 34th | 3rd | 40 | 11th | KO/1R | — | — |
| 40 | 2003–04 | Eerste Divisie | 35th | 4th | 28 | 17th | 3R | — | — |
| 41 | 2004–05 | Eerste Divisie | 36th | 5th | 47 | 9th | 2R | — | — |
| 42 | 2005–06 | Eerste Divisie | 37th | 6th | 47 | 15th | 2R | — | — |
| 43 | 2006–07 | Eerste Divisie | 38th | 7th | 47 | 12th | 2R | — | — |
| 44 | 2007–08 | Eerste Divisie | 39th | 8th | 39 | 17th | 3R | — | — |
| 45 | 2008–09 | Eerste Divisie | 40th | 9th | 69 | 3rd | 3R | — | — |
| 46 | 2009–10 | Eerste Divisie | 41st | 10th | 71 | 2nd | 2R | — | — |
| 47 | 2010–11 | Eerste Divisie | 42nd | 11th | 51 | 5th | R32 | — | — |
| 48 | 2011–12 | Eerste Divisie | 43rd | 12th | 56 | 7th | 2R | — | — |
| 49 | 2012–13 | Eerste Divisie | 44th | 13th | 61 | 1st | R16 | — | — |
| 50 | 2013–14 | Eredivisie | 5th | 1st | 39 | 12th | R16 | — | — |
| 51 | 2014–15 | Eredivisie | 6th | 2nd | 41 | 12th | QF | — | — |
| 52 | 2015–16 | Eredivisie | 7th | 3rd | 18 | 18th | 2R | — | — |
| 53 | 2016–17 | Eerste Divisie | 45th | 1st | 71 | 3rd | SF | (Netherlands) Sander van de Streek | 23 |
| 54 | 2017–18 | Eerste Divisie | 46th | 2nd | 58 | 8th | QF | (Netherlands) Martijn Barto | 14 |
| 55 | 2018–19 | Eerste Divisie | 47th | 3rd | 58 | 10th | 1R | (Netherlands) Kevin van Kippersluis | 10 |
| 56 | 2019–20 | Eerste Divisie | 48th | 4th | 66 | 1st (Note: No champion is decided in Eerste Divisie due to COVID-19 pandemic.) | R32 | (Netherlands) Robert Mühren | 26 |
| 57 | 2020–21 | Eerste Divisie | 49th | 5th | 92 | 1st | 2R | (Netherlands) Robert Mühren | 38 |
| 58 | 2021–22 | Eredivisie | 8th | 1st | 39 | 9th | R32 | (Latvia) Roberts Uldrikis | 7 |
| 59 | 2022–23 | Eredivisie | 9th | 2nd | 19 | 17th | R32 | (Norway) Bjorn Johnsen (Netherlands) Mees Hoedemakers | 3 |
| 60 | 2023–24 | Eerste Divisie | 50th | 1st | 47 | 13th | SF | (Netherlands) Milan Smit | 24 |
| 61 | 2024–25 | Eerste Divisie | 51st | 2nd | 71 | 3rd | R32 | (Netherlands) Remco Balk | 17 |
| 62 | 2025–26 | Eerste Divisie | 52nd | 3rd | 78 | 2nd | 2R | (France) Ichem Ferrah | 12 |
