= Rosheuvel =

Rosheuvel is a surname, likely of Dutch origin. Notable people with the surname include:

- Darren Rosheuvel (born 1994), Dutch professional footballer
- Golda Rosheuvel (born 1970), Guyanese-British actress and singer
- Mikhail Rosheuvel (born 1990), Dutch professional footballer
