= Nigel Bertrams =

Dutch professional footballer

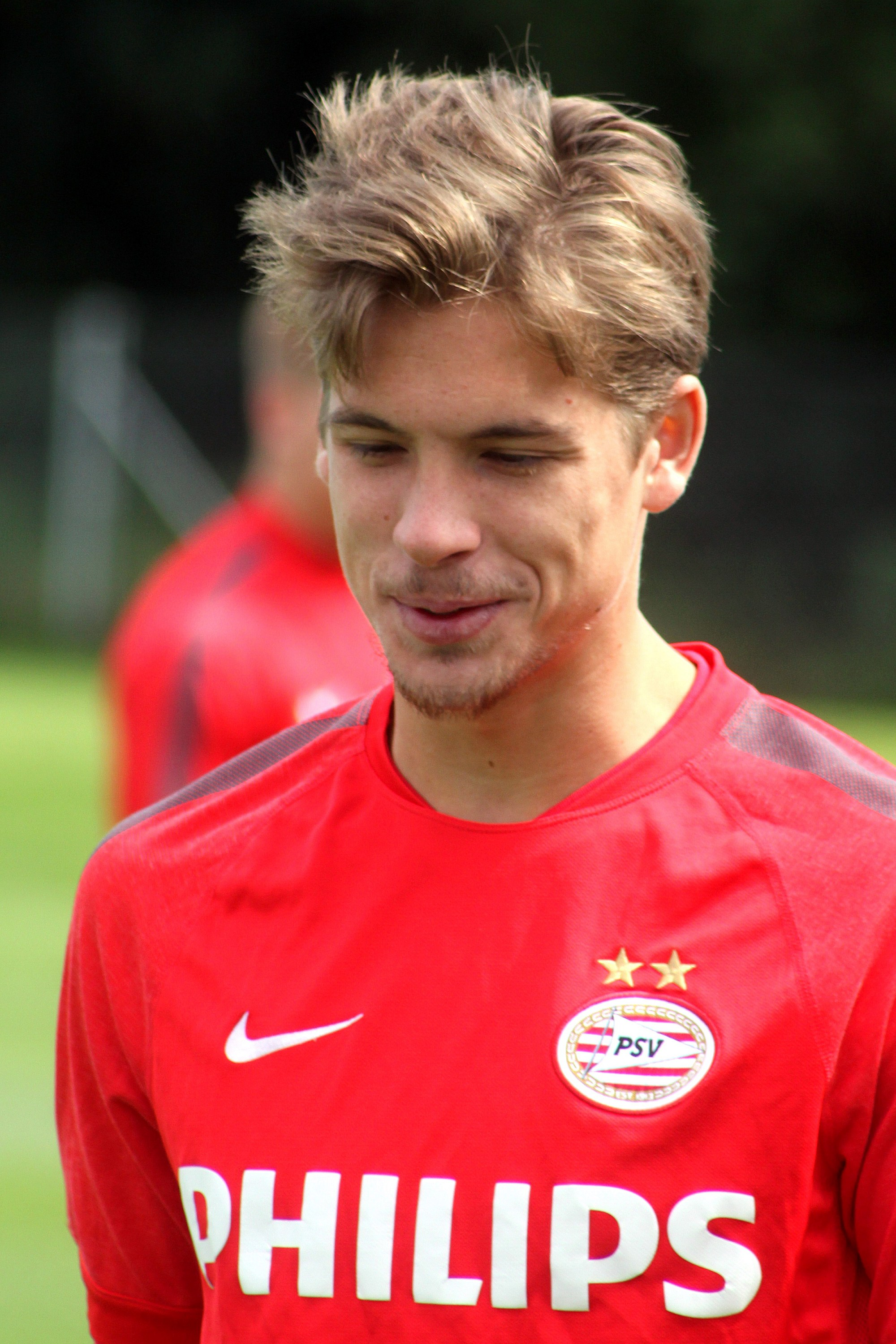

Personal information
- Date of birth: 8 January 1993 (age 33)
- Place of birth: Best, Netherlands
- Height: 1.89 m (6 ft 2 in)
- Position: Goalkeeper

Youth career
- Best Vooruit
- 2001–2013: PSV

Senior career*
Years	Team	Apps	(Gls)
2013–2015	PSV	0	(0)
2013–2015	Jong PSV	12	(0)
2015–2017	Willem II	0	(0)
2017–2018	NAC Breda	16	(0)
2018–2019	Nordsjælland	0	(0)
2019	→ De Graafschap (loan)	11	(0)
2019–2020	MVV	21	(0)
2020	Groningen	0	(0)
2021	PEC Zwolle	0	(0)
2021–2023	FC Eindhoven	81	(0)

International career
2011	Netherlands U18	1	(0)
2011–2012	Netherlands U19	3	(0)
2013	Netherlands U20	1	(0)
- * Club domestic league appearances and goals as of 23 May 2023

Nigel Bertrams (born 8 January 1993) is a Dutch former professional footballer who played as a goalkeeper.

== Club career ==
Bertrams was born in Best. He is a youth product of PSV Eindhoven. He made his professional debut as Jong PSV player in the second division on 3 August 2013 against Sparta Rotterdam. He moved to Willem II in the summer 2015. In 2017, not having played a single match for Willem II, he made a free transfer to NAC Breda. After one season, he signed with Danish side FC Nordsjælland.

Bertrams was loaned out from Nordsjælland to De Graafschap on 29 January 2019, for the rest of the season. On 27 August 2019, he joined MVV Maastricht.

On 18 August 2020, Bertrams signed a one-year contract with FC Groningen to replace Jan Hoekstra, who had been sent on loan to SC Cambuur. On 1 February 2021, it was announced that Bertrams signed a six-month contract with PEC Zwolle.

On 24 June 2021, he signed a one-year deal with FC Eindhoven.

He retired from playing in the summer of 2023.

== Personal life ==
His younger brother Jesse also played for PSV.
