= Emmanuel Mbende =

Cameroonian footballer (born 1996)

Personal information
- Full name: Moïse Emmanuel Mbende
- Date of birth: 3 March 1996 (age 30)
- Place of birth: Douala, Cameroon
- Height: 1.96 m (6 ft 5 in)
- Position: Centre back

Team information
- Current team: Valletta
- Number: 33

Youth career
- 2006–2008: SC Weitmar 45
- 2008–2015: Borussia Dortmund

Senior career*
Years	Team	Apps	(Gls)
2015–2016	Birmingham City	0	(0)
2016–2018	Chemnitzer FC	23	(0)
2018–2019	SC Cambuur	26	(1)
2019–2020	Catania	19	(0)
2020–2021	Viterbese	28	(4)
2021–2024	Monterosi Tuscia	87	(6)
2024–2025	Gostivar	25	(0)
2025–	Valletta	26	(2)

International career
2014–201?	Cameroon U20		
- * Club domestic league appearances and goals as of 7 May 2026

Moïse Emmanuel Mbende (born 3 March 1996) is a Cameroonian footballer who plays as a centre back for Maltese Premier League club Valletta.

He began his football career in the youth system of Borussia Dortmund before spending the 2015–16 season with English Championship (second-tier) club Birmingham City, but played no first-team football for either. He then returned to Germany, where he spent two years with 3. Liga club Chemnitzer FC before signing for SC Cambuur of the Dutch Eerste Divisie. A year later, he moved on to Catania, joined Viterbese in 2020, and spent three years with Monterosi Tuscia before joining Gostivar in 2024. In international football, Mbende has represented his native Cameroon at under-20 level.

== Club career ==
Mbende was born in Douala, Cameroon, and came to Germany in 2006. The family settled in Bochum, where he began his football career with SC Weitmar 45. He was spotted by Borussia Dortmund and recruited into their youth system at the under-13 level. He went on to play for two seasons in the UEFA Youth League, but left the club at the end of the 2014–15 season.

After trials in the Netherlands with Eredivisie club PEC Zwolle and MVV Maastricht of the Eerste Divisie, and in England with Football League Championship clubs Derby County, and Birmingham City, Mbende signed for the latter club in September 2015 until the end of the season. He was a regular member of Birmingham's under-21 team playing in the Professional Development League, and was a member of the Birmingham reserve team that lost the 2016 Birmingham Senior Cup final to National League North champions Solihull Moors, but did not break through to the first team.

He was offered a one-year contract, with an option for another year, in April 2016, and manager Gary Rowett expected him either to challenge the existing first-team centre-backs or to go out on loan to a lower-division club. However, he turned down the contract offer, preferring to return to Germany to study and to play for 3. Liga club Chemnitzer FC, with whom he signed a two-year deal; Birmingham included a "significant" sell-on clause in the deal.

Mbende began his Chemnitz career on the bench, but made his senior debut in their fourth match of the 2016–17 3. Liga season, away to VfR Aalen on 14 August 2016. He replaced Marc Endres after 80 minutes with his team 2–0 ahead, but the hosts scored two minutes later, and deep into stoppage time, Mbende's headed clearance fell to Gerrit Wegkamp who volleyed it home from distance to secure a draw. Injuries among the regular defenders brought Mbende his first start, away to 1. FC Magdeburg on 22 October, in which he faced one of the league's leading scorers, the equally physical Christian Beck. Mbende had the better of the encounter: Beck scored once, but Chemnitz achieved their first away win of the season, by four goals to two.

Mbende joined SC Cambuur of the Dutch Eerste Divisie (second tier) in May 2018. He left the club at the end of the 2018–19 season.

On 8 August 2019, Mbende signed a two-year contract with Italian Serie C club Catania. He made 23 appearances in all competitions in 2019–20, helping Catania reach the play-offs in which they were eliminated in the second round, but was allowed to leave at the end of the season.

Mbende joined another Serie C club, Viterbese, on 31 August 2020 on a two-year deal. He scored four goals from 28 league matches in his first season, but despite the club president's insistence that Mbende would not leave unless they received an offer they could not refuse, he was released by mutual consent on 25 August, after the 2021–22 season had already begun.

The next day, he signed a multi-year contract with Monterosi Tuscia, newly promoted to Serie C, where he spent three years before the team were relegated in 2024.

Mbende joined Gostivar of the Macedonian First League on 29 June 2024.

== International career ==
Mbende represented Cameroon at youth level. He played for their under-20 team in the 2015 African U-20 Championship qualification process.

== Career statistics ==
As of match played 9 March 2025

Appearances and goals by club, season and competition
Club	Season	League			National cup (Note: Includes DFB-Pokal, KNVB Cup, Coppa Italia, Macedonian Cup)		Other		Total	
Club	Season	Division	Apps	Goals	Apps	Goals	Apps	Goals	Apps	Goals
Chemnitzer FC	2016–17	3. Liga	14	0	—		3 (Note: Appearances in Saxony Cup)	0	17	0
Chemnitzer FC	2017–18	3. Liga	9	0	0	0	1	0	10	0
Chemnitzer FC	Total		23	0	0	0	4	0	27	0
SC Cambuur	2018–19	Eerste Divisie	26	1	3	0	3 (Note: Appearances in Eerste Divisie promotion play-offs)	1	32	2
Catania	2019–20	Serie C	19	0	0	0	4 (Note: Two appearances in Coppa Italia Serie C, two in Serie C promotion play-offs)	0	23	0
Viterbese	2020–21	Serie C	28	4	0	0	0	0	28	4
Viterbese	2021–22	Serie C	—		—		0	0	—	
Viterbese	Total		28	4	0	0	0	0	28	4
Monterosi Tuscia	2021–22	Serie C	23	3	0	0	1 (Note: Appearance in Serie C promotion play-offs)	0	24	3
Monterosi Tuscia	2022–23	Serie C	34	1	0	0	1 (Note: Appearance in Coppa Italia Serie C)	0	35	1
Monterosi Tuscia	2023–24	Serie C	30	2	0	0	2 (Note: Appearance in Serie C relegation play-outs)	0	32	2
Monterosi Tuscia	Total		87	6	0	0	4	0	91	6
Gostivar	2024–25	Macedonian First League	22	0	3	0	0	0	25	0
Career total			205	11	6	0	15	1	226	12
