= Cody Claver =

Dutch footballer (born 1996)

Personal information
- Date of birth: 2 November 1996 (age 30)
- Place of birth: The Hague, Netherlands
- Height: 1.80 m (5 ft 11 in)
- Position: Left back

Team information
- Current team: Spakenburg
- Number: 4

Youth career
- Haaglandia
- 2013–2015: ADO Den Haag
- 2015: Haaglandia
- 2015–2016: Sparta Rotterdam
- 2016–2017: Cambuur

Senior career*
Years	Team	Apps	(Gls)
2017–2019	Cambuur	2	(0)
2019–2025	AFC	160	(9)
2025–	Spakenburg	32	(0)
- * Club domestic league appearances and goals as of 24 May 2026

Cody Claver (born 2 November 1996) is a Dutch footballer who plays as a left-back for Tweede Divisie club Spakenburg.

== Early and personal life ==
Born in The Hague, Claver is of Surinamese descent. His father is Surinamese and his mother is Dutch. His family lived in Zoetermeer. He was a childhood friend of Omar el Baad, who played with him at Cambuur and suggested he join the club. Whilst with the club the two shared a house in Leeuwarden.

== Career ==
Claver began his career with Haaglandia, and he then spent two years at ADO Den Haag before returning to Haglandia. He also played for the youth teams of Sparta Rotterdam and SC Cambuur. He joined the Cambuur senior team for the 2017–18 season, making his professional debut in April 2018, playing as a right back rather than in his usual position of left back.

In January 2019 he moved to AFC. He stated his intention to resume studies for his HBO qualification alongside his football career.
