= Mathias Schils =

Belgian footballer

Personal information
- Date of birth: 1 May 1993 (age 33)
- Place of birth: Hasselt, Belgium
- Height: 1.83 m (6 ft 0 in)
- Position: Midfielder

Team information
- Current team: Lyra-Lierse
- Number: 21

Youth career
- 2000–2001: Diepenbeek
- 2001–2002: Melo Zonhoven
- 2002–2010: Genk
- 2010–2012: Sint-Truiden

Senior career*
Years	Team	Apps	(Gls)
2012–2016	Sint-Truiden	90	(7)
2016–2017	Lommel United	30	(2)
2017–2019	Cambuur	45	(1)
2019–2021	Deinze	51	(4)
2021–2023	Lokeren-Temse	17	(0)
2022–2023	→ Lyra-Lierse (loan)	19	(1)
2023–	Lyra-Lierse	80	(13)
- * Club domestic league appearances and goals as of 3 May 2026

Mathias Schils (born 1 May 1993) is a Belgian professional footballer who plays as a midfielder for Lyra-Lierse.
