= Jesse Bertrams =

Dutch professional football player

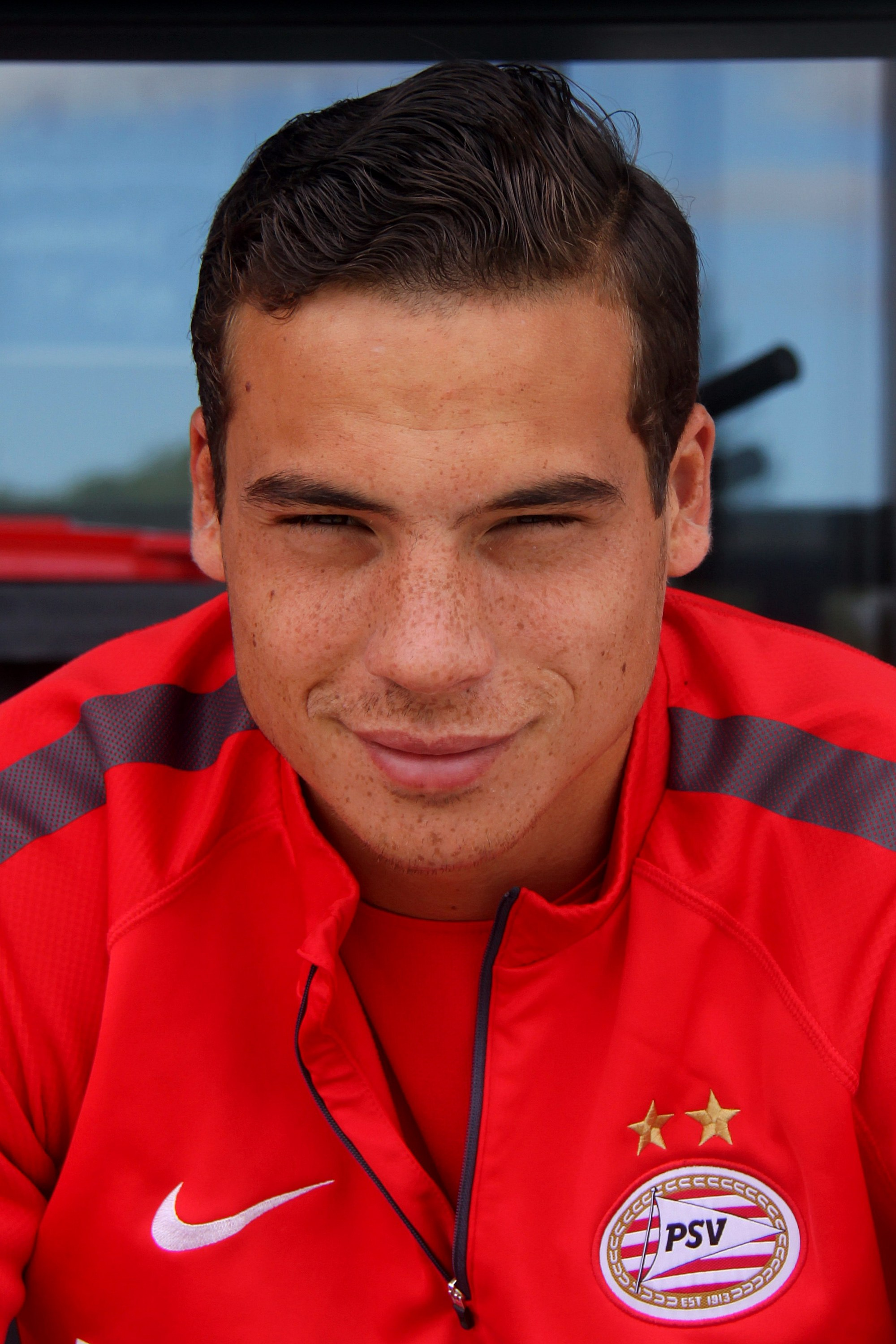
- Bertrams at PSV in 2014

Personal information
- Full name: Jesse Bertrams
- Date of birth: 22 December 1994 (age 31)
- Place of birth: Best, Netherlands
- Height: 6 ft 2 in (1.88 m)
- Position: Goalkeeper

Youth career
- PSV Eindhoven

Senior career*
Years	Team	Apps	(Gls)
2013–2016	PSV	0	(0)
2013–2016	Jong PSV	39	(0)
2016–2017	Lommel United	34	(0)
2017–2018	SC Cambuur	9	(0)
2019	ASV Geel	10	(0)
2019–2020	Lommel	0	(0)

International career
2015	Netherlands U21	2	(0)
- * Club domestic league appearances and goals as of 16:57, 4 February 2021 (UTC)

Jesse Bertrams (born 22 December 1994) is a Dutch professional football player who plays as a goalkeeper.

== Club career ==
Bertrams made his professional debut as Jong PSV player in the second division on 28 October 2013 against SC Telstar in a 3–1 home win. He played the full game. During the 2013/14, he managed to play 6 games for Jong PSV.

He moved abroad in summer 2016 when he signed for Belgian second tier side Lommel United.

== Personal life ==
His brother Nigel also played for PSV. Nigel Bertrams is at the moment goalkeeper at NAC Breda
