= Erik Cummins =

Dutch footballer (born 1988)

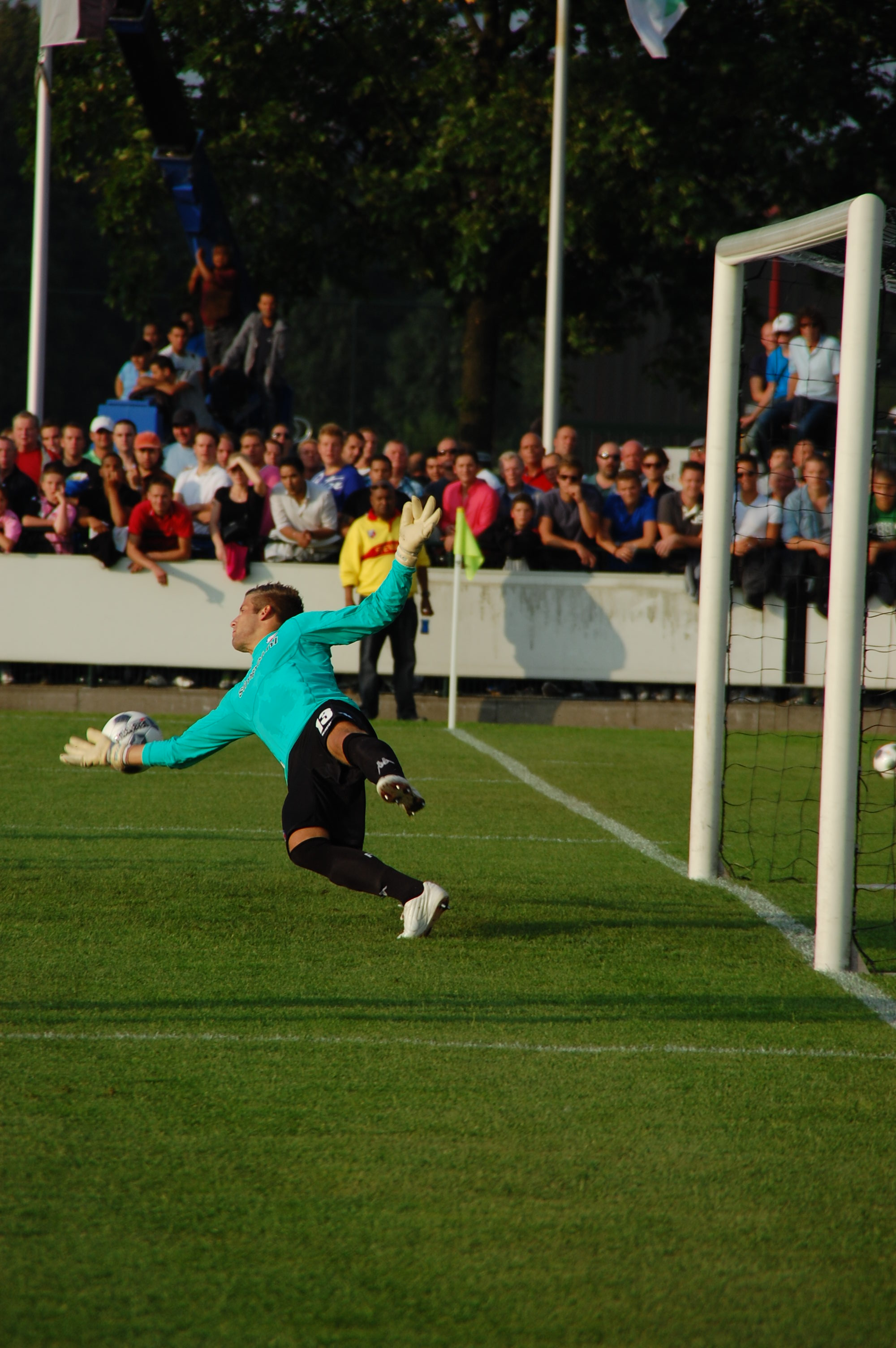

Personal information
- Date of birth: 10 August 1988 (age 38)
- Place of birth: Rotterdam, Netherlands
- Height: 1.83 m (6 ft 0 in)
- Position: Goalkeeper

Senior career*
Years	Team	Apps	(Gls)
2011–2013	Utrecht	3	(0)
2013–2017	Go Ahead Eagles	19	(1)
2017–2018	Cambuur	29	(0)
2018–2023	Lisse	111	(0)

International career
2003	Netherlands U15	1	(0)
2004	Netherlands U16	2	(0)
- * Club domestic league appearances and goals as of 24 March 2023

Erik Cummins (born 10 August 1988) is a Dutch retired football player who played as a goalkeeper.

== Club career ==
He formerly played for FC Utrecht.

In August 2014, he became the first goalkeeper to score in the Eredivisie since 2005 when he netted for Go Ahead Eagles against Excelsior. He retired at Lisse after the 2022-23 season.

== International career ==
Cummins played once for the Netherlands national under-15 football team and twice for the U16s.
