= Ricardo Kip =

Dutch footballer

Personal information
- Full name: Ricardo Luciano Kip
- Date of birth: 15 March 1992 (age 34)
- Place of birth: Zoetermeer, Netherlands
- Height: 1.70 m (5 ft 7 in)
- Position: Midfielder

Youth career
- –2003: FC Zoetermeer
- 2003–2011: Ajax

Senior career*
| Years | Team | Apps | (Gls) |
| 2011–2012 | Jong Ajax | | |
| 2012–2016 | Almere City | 117 | (24) |
| 2016–2018 | Fleetwood Town | 1 | (0) |
| 2016–2018 | → Cambuur (loan) | 40 | (7) |
| 2018–2020 | Almere City | 37 | (4) |
| 2020 | Doxa Drama | 0 | (0) |
| 2021 | Den Bosch | 7 | (0) |
| 2022–2023 | Oțelul Galați | 1 | (0) |

International career
| 2008–2009 | Netherlands U17 | 3 | (0) |
- * Club domestic league appearances and goals as of 8 October 2022

Ricardo Luciano Kip (born 15 March 1992) is a Dutch professional footballer who plays as a midfielder.

== Club career ==
=== Ajax ===
Kip was born in Zoetermeer. The son of a Dutch father and a mother of Italian descent, he was recruited to play in the youth ranks of Ajax at age 11. He since represented Ajax on every youth level, before signing a one-year contract with the club on 30 May 2011. Playing his first year on the reserve squad of Jong Ajax, without making any appearances for the first team, Kip's contract was not renewed before the upcoming season, and he subsequently moved to Almere City FC as a free transfer in the summer of 2013.

=== Almere City ===
Signing a two-year contract with the club from Flevoland, binding him until 2015, Kip made his Eerste Divisie debut on 10 August 2012, in the 0–2 home loss to Go Ahead Eagles. He made his debut in the KNVB Cup in the second round for Almere City against ADO '20, a match which ended in a 4–1 loss in Heemskerk.

=== Fleetwood Town ===
He was released by Fleetwood at the end of the 2017–18 season, after making one appearance as a substitute. He had also been sent on loan at Cambuur before his release.

=== Later career ===
Kip returned to Almere City on a two-year contract in June 2018. In September 2020, Kip signed with Super League Greece 2 club Doxa Drama.

== International career ==
Kip gained three caps for the Netherlands national under-17 team, making his international debut on 25 October 2008 in a friendly against Latvia.
