= Maarten Peijnenburg =

Dutch footballer (born 1997)

Personal information
- Full name: Maarten Vincent Pieter Peijnenburg
- Date of birth: 10 January 1997 (age 29)
- Place of birth: Boxtel, Netherlands
- Height: 1.86 m (6 ft 1 in)
- Position: Centre-back

Team information
- Current team: Blauw Geel '38
- Number: 4

Youth career
- ODC
- 2005–2016: PSV

Senior career*
Years	Team	Apps	(Gls)
2014–2016	Jong PSV	1	(0)
2016–2018	Jong Utrecht	50	(4)
2018–2019	Dordrecht	37	(1)
2019–2025	Eindhoven	117	(4)
2025–	Blauw Geel '38	13	(1)
- * Club domestic league appearances and goals as of 17:28, 19 February 2026 (UTC)

Maarten Vincent Pieter Peijnenburg (born 10 January 1997) is a Dutch footballer who plays as a centre back for Blauw Geel '38.

== Career ==
He made his professional debut in the Eerste Divisie for Jong PSV on 20 March 2015 in a game against SC Telstar.< He came on as a substitute for Clint Leemans after 77 minutes. Jong PSV drew 1–1 at Telstar Stadium. Augustine Loof scored the equaliser after 64 minutes, after Jonathan Kindermans had scored the opening goal.

In the summer of 2016, Peijnenburg left for FC Utrecht as a free agent. He made his debut for the second team Jong FC Utrecht in the 4–1 away loss to NAC Breda. He was replaced at the break by Odysseus Velanas. On 20 March 2018, FC Utrecht announced that his expiring contract would not be extended. His contract included a unilateral option for an extra season, but the club decided not to exercise this option. That meant that Peijnenburg had to look for a new club. He eventually signed a one-year contract with an option for an extra year with FC Dordrecht.

On 1 July 2019, Peijnenburg signed a two-year contract with FC Eindhoven. He retired from professional football at the end of the 2024–25 season after an extended spell with injuries, including two anterior cruciate ligament tears. He subsequently took up a civilian role in vocational rehabilitation at his father's firm, Peijnenburg Re-integratie. On 20 May 2025, he joined amateur club Blauw Geel '38 of Veghel, who compete in the fourth-tier Derde Divisie.
