= Martijn van der Laan =

Dutch footballer

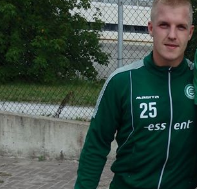

Personal information
- Date of birth: 29 July 1988 (age 38)
- Place of birth: Hoogezand, Netherlands
- Height: 1.75 m (5 ft 9 in)
- Position: Centre back

Youth career
- vv-Hoogezand
- Groningen

Senior career*
Years	Team	Apps	(Gls)
2007–2008	Groningen	2	(0)
2008–2011	BV Veendam	53	(2)
2011	→ Cambuur (loan)	8	(0)
2011–2014	Cambuur	83	(4)
2014–2017	Groningen	14	(0)
2015–2016	→ Cambuur (loan)	21	(0)
2017–2018	Cambuur	7	(0)
2019–2021	Genemuiden	23	(0)
2021–2023	VV Noordbergum		

International career
	Netherlands U17	15	(1)
Medal record
Men's football
Representing Netherlands
UEFA European Under-17 Championship
Runner-up	2005
- * Club domestic league appearances and goals as of 11:37, 23 April 2024 (UTC)

Martijn van der Laan (born 29 July 1988 in Hoogezand) is a Dutch former professional footballer who plays as a centre back. He formerly played for BV Veendam and SC Cambuur.

== Career ==
In January 2019 it was confirmed, that van der Laan would join SC Genemuiden from the upcoming 2019–20 season.
