= Alvin Daniels =

Surinamese professional footballer

Personal information
- Full name: Alvin Kevin Daniels
- Date of birth: 10 February 1994 (age 32)
- Place of birth: Paramaribo, Suriname
- Height: 1.80 m (5 ft 11 in)
- Position: Winger

Youth career
- DWS
- VVA/Spartaan
- De Graafschap
- FC Twente

Senior career*
Years	Team	Apps	(Gls)
2013–2015	FC Twente	0	(0)
2013–2015	Jong FC Twente	46	(1)
2015–2017	FC Dordrecht	68	(14)
2017–2018	SC Cambuur	28	(2)
2018–2020	FC Eindhoven	56	(8)
2021	Como	13	(0)
- * Club domestic league appearances and goals as of 21 May 2021

Alvin Kevin Daniels (born 10 February 1994) is a Surinamese professional footballer who plays as winger. He formerly played for FC Twente, FC Dordrecht and SC Cambuur. He was born in Paramaribo, Suriname.

== Club career ==
On 29 January 2021, he signed a contract with Italian club Como until the end of the 2020–21 season.

== International career ==
In 2014, Daniels was selected for the Netherlands national under-21 football team. However, it was later discovered that he did not have Dutch nationality, and thus was ineligible to represent the Netherlands. He remained eligible to represent France as part of the French Guiana national football team.
