= Robbert Schilder =

Dutch footballer (born 1986)

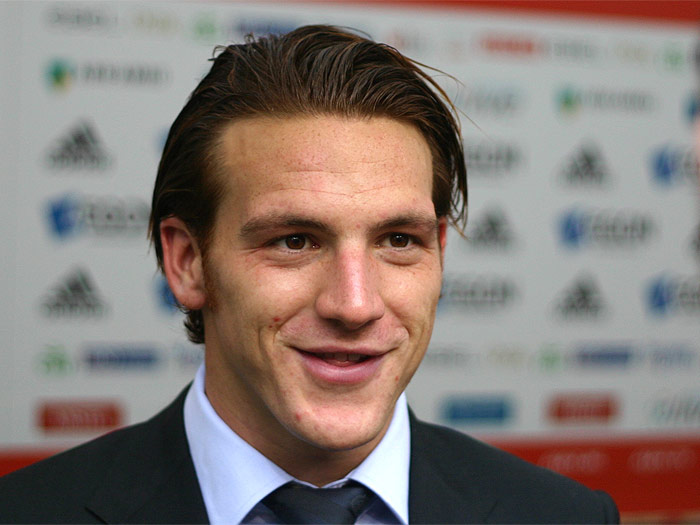
- Schilder in 2008

Personal information
- Date of birth: 18 April 1986 (age 40)
- Place of birth: Amstelveen, Netherlands
- Height: 1.78 m (5 ft 10 in)
- Positions: Left back; midfielder

Team information
- Current team: AFC
- Number: 15

Youth career
- 1992–1993: NFC Amstelveen
- 1993–1999: Amstelveen Heemraad
- 1999–2005: Ajax

Senior career*
Years	Team	Apps	(Gls)
2005–2009	Ajax	23	(1)
2006–2007	→ Heracles Almelo (loan)	31	(1)
2008–2009	→ Heracles Almelo (loan)	11	(2)
2009–2012	NAC Breda	94	(12)
2012–2016	Twente	97	(2)
2013–2014	Jong Twente	5	(0)
2016–2019	Cambuur	99	(2)
2019–2022	AFC	30	(2)
Total		390	(22)

International career
2005–2007	Netherlands U21	7	(0)
Medal record
Men's football
Representing Netherlands
UEFA European Under-21 Championship
Winner	2007 Netherlands
- * Club domestic league appearances and goals

Robbert Schilder (born 18 April 1986) is a Dutch former professional footballer who played as a centre-back.

== Club career ==
=== Ajax ===
Born in Amstelveen, Schilder started playing for local club NFC at age 6, before moving to VV Amstelveen Heemraad. There, he was scouted by Ajax, and eventually joined their famed youth academy in 1999. After progressed through the different youth levels of the Amsterdam club between 1999 and 2005, Schilder was added to the Ajax first team in the winter break of the 2005–06 season. In the home game against Willem II on 8 February 2006, he made his debut for the club. In that season, his contribution on the pitch was limited to four appearances. Ajax won the KNVB Cup that year, but Schilder did not play any minutes in the tournament.

Because the cup was won, Ajax started the following season with a match against PSV for the Johan Cruyff Shield. Schilder was in the starting lineup for that game, but he was substituted off by head coach Henk ten Cate at half-time. Ajax won the game that would also be the only appearance for Schilder for Ajax that season. He left on a season-long loan to Heracles Almelo, where he played 31 league matches and scored once. He also made one appearance in the cup tournament, where he managed to score.

After the loan, Schilder returned to Ajax in 2007. Until the winter break, he played eight matches in the Eredivisie and one cup match and scored once. In January, Schilder was sent on another loan to Heracles. He played another eleven matches in the Eredivisie for the Almelo club in which he scored two goals, and he also played two cup matches, scoring one goal.

In the 2008–09 season, Schilder returned to Ajax again, but did not manage to establish himself as a starter. His contribution was limited to eighteen matches, including five in the UEFA Cup. Schilder was unable to score that year and did not see his expiring contract renewed.

=== NAC Breda ===
In the 2009–10 season, Schilder signed a four-year contract with NAC Breda. He became a permanent fixture for the club. In three seasons, Schilder played 94 league matches for the club, scoring twelve times. He also played nine cup matches and played six games in the UEFA Europa League.

=== Twente ===
On 17 June 2012, Schilder signed by league rivals Twente. NAC received about €1.5 million for the transfer. Schilder signed a four-year contract in Enschede. He made his debut on 5 July in a 6–0 win over UE Santa Coloma, netting his first brace by scoring in the 28th and 29th minute of the game. His debut in the domestic league followed on 12 August in a 4–1 home win over FC Groningen.

=== Cambuur ===
From 2016 to 2019, Schilder played for Cambuur where he became team captain.

=== AFC ===
In November 2019 he started playing for AFC in the Tweede Divisie.

== International career ==
In 2007, Schilder was called up by Netherlands U21 coach Foppe de Haan to be part of his squad for the 2007 UEFA European Under-21 Football Championship held in the Netherlands, that retained their title and that qualified the team for the 2008 Summer Olympics by beating Serbia 4–1 in the final.

== Honours ==
Ajax

- KNVB Cup: 2005–06
- Johan Cruyff Shield: 2006

Netherlands U21

- UEFA European Under-21 Championship: 2007
