= Jurjan Mannes =

Dutch footballer (born 1992)

Personal information
- Date of birth: 26 January 1992 (age 34)
- Place of birth: Groningen, Netherlands
- Height: 1.77 m (5 ft 10 in)
- Position: Midfielder

Team information
- Current team: SVZW

Youth career
- VUC Den Haag
- Oranje Nassau
- FC Twente

Senior career*
Years	Team	Apps	(Gls)
2013–2014	Jong FC Twente	21	(0)
2012–2013	→ Fortuna Sittard (loan)	10	(0)
2014–2017	FC Emmen	72	(3)
2017	→ SC Cambuur (loan)	11	(0)
2017–2018	SC Cambuur	10	(0)
2018–2023	HHC Hardenberg	119	(24)
2023–	SVZW		
- * Club domestic league appearances and goals as of 15:52, 9 May 2024 (UTC)

Jurjan Mannes (born 26 January 1992) is a Dutch footballer who plays as a midfielder for SVZW.
