= Jordy van Deelen =

Dutch footballer (born 1993)

Personal information
- Date of birth: 29 June 1993 (age 33)
- Place of birth: Zwijndrecht, Netherlands
- Height: 1.75 m (5 ft 9 in)
- Position: Right-back

Youth career
- Feyenoord

Senior career*
Years	Team	Apps	(Gls)
2011–2014	Feyenoord	1	(0)
2011–2013	→ Excelsior (loan)	38	(0)
2014	→ Dordrecht (loan)	4	(0)
2014–2015	Dordrecht	14	(0)
2015–2016	Emmen	18	(0)
2016–2020	Cambuur	53	(3)
2021–2022	ZVV Pelikaan		
- * Club domestic league appearances and goals as of 4 December 2022

Jordy van Deelen (born 29 June 1993) is a Dutch professional footballer who plays as a right-back.

== Club career ==
Van Deelen made his professional debut for local club Excelsior on 21 January 2012 in an Eredivisie home match against NAC Breda (3–0). He also played for Feyenoord, FC Dordrecht and FC Emmen.

He joined Cambuur in summer 2016. After an injury-hit career, van Deelen joined his twin brother Yorik at childhood, amateur, club ZVV Pelikaan in 2021.
