= Justin Mathieu =

Dutch footballer (born 1996)

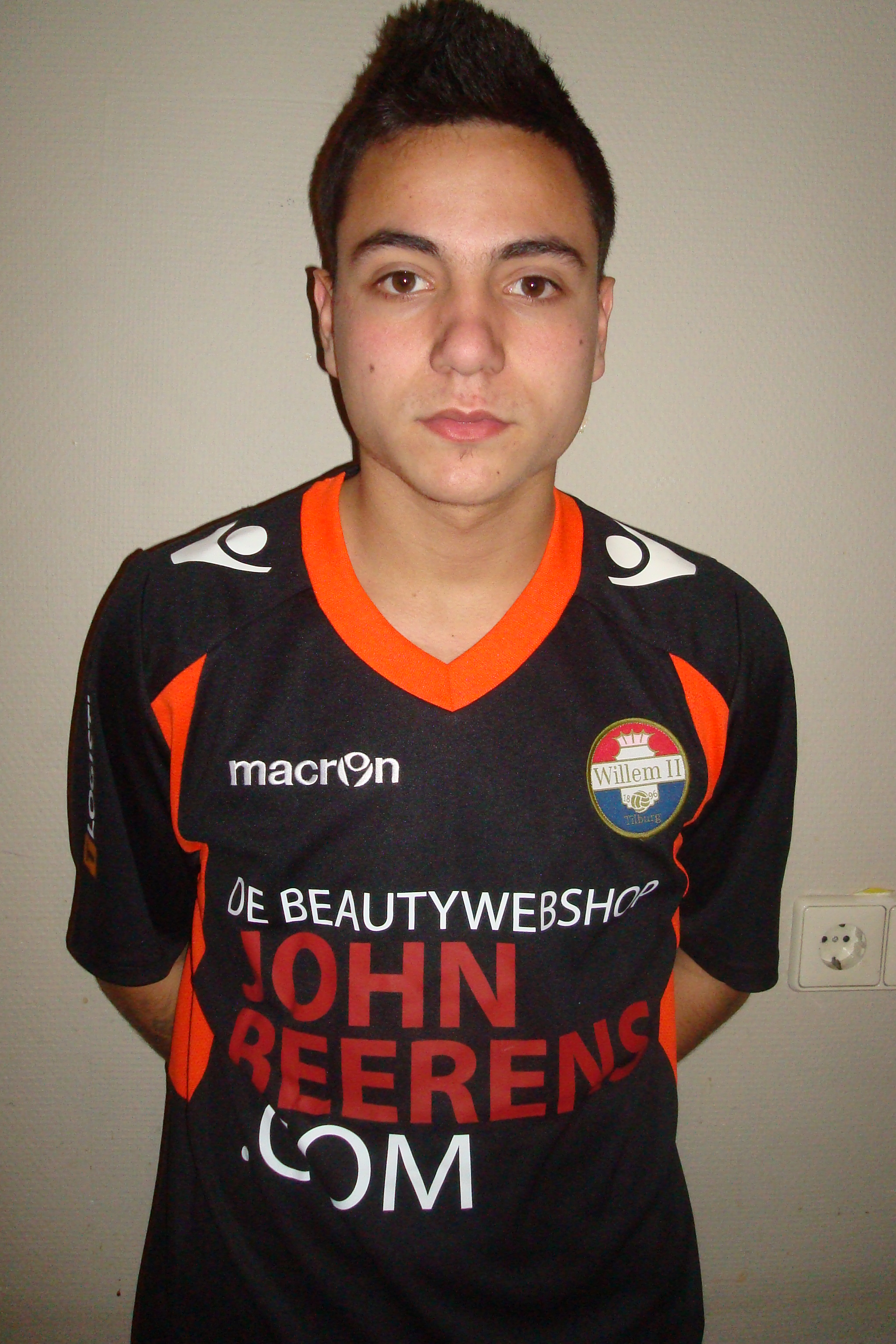
- Mathieu with Willem II in 2013

Personal information
- Date of birth: 12 April 1996 (age 30)
- Place of birth: Goirle, Netherlands
- Height: 1.74 m (5 ft 9 in)
- Positions: Attacking midfielder; winger

Team information
- Current team: TOP Oss
- Number: 11

Youth career
- 2001–2003: SV Triborgh
- 2003–2013: Willem II

Senior career*
Years	Team	Apps	(Gls)
2013–2016	Willem II	13	(1)
2014–2015	→ FC Oss (loan)	34	(8)
2015	→ Go Ahead Eagles (loan)	5	(0)
2016–2017	FC Oss	36	(10)
2017–2018	Cambuur	44	(10)
2019–2020	Gorica	25	(0)
2021–2023	TOP Oss	58	(13)
2023–2024	Noah	33	(4)
2025	Al-Riffa	9	(3)
2025–	TOP Oss	6	(0)

International career
2011–2012	Netherlands U16	6	(1)
2012–2013	Netherlands U17	8	(0)
- * Club domestic league appearances and goals as of 11:55, 19 September 2026 (UTC)

Justin Mathieu (born 12 April 1996) is a Dutch professional footballer who plays as an attacking midfielder or winger for Eerste Divisie club TOP Oss.

== Career ==
=== Willem II ===
Born in Goirle, Mathieu began his football career at amateur club SV Triborgh. In 2003, aged 7, he was signed for the Willem II youth academy. Mathieu was part of the Netherlands U16 squad.

In the summer of 2013, Willem II manager Jurgen Streppel selected ten players from the youth academy to be part of the first team in preparation for the new season. At the start of the competition it was announced that, together with two other youth players, Mathieu would be a permanent member of the first team for the rest of the season. On 23 August 2013, at the age of 17, he made his professional debut in a 3–0 home win against Sparta Rotterdam replacing Bruno Andrade in the 89th minute. On 28 August, it was announced that Mathieu had signed his first professional contract. Willem II signed him for three years.

On 14 August 2014, it was announced that Mathieu was sent on loan to Eerste Divisie side FC Oss until the end of the season. There, he played almost all matches that season and contributed to the team winning a "period title".

Upon his return to Willem II, Mathieu made his debut in the Eredivisie for the club in August 2015. One day before the summer transfer market closed that month, the club sent Mathieu on loan to Go Ahead Eagles for the remainder of the season, who had suffered relegation to the Eerste Divisie in the previous season. As of 1 January 2016, the club from Deventer no longer needed him and he returned to Tilburg.

=== Cambuur ===
In July 2017, Mathieu signed a contract until mid-2020 with Cambuur, who had signed him after he had experienced a strong season as part of the FC Oss team in 2016–17, where he had scored 10 goals and made 10 assists. Mathieu experienced a tumultuous time in Cambuur, serving three separate suspensions for the club in one year due to disciplinary issues.

=== Gorica ===
In February 2019, he moved to the Croatian club HNK Gorica where he signed a contract until mid-2022. He left the club at the end of May 2020, to be in the Netherlands for the birth of his son during the COVID-19 pandemic.

=== Return to TOP Oss ===
In January 2021, Mathieu returned to FC Oss – which had since been renamed TOP Oss – on a six-month amateur deal. It was his third spell with the club.

=== Noah ===
In July 2023, Mathieu left TOP Oss and signed a contract with Armenian Premier League club Noah. During his sole season with the club, he scored four goals across 35 appearances in all competitions.

== Personal life ==
Mathieu is of Indonesian descent. His younger brother, Dani, is also a professional footballer.

== Honours ==
Willem II

- Eerste Divisie: 2013–14
