= Daan Boerlage =

Dutch football player

Personal information
- Date of birth: 7 August 1997 (age 29)
- Place of birth: Alkmaar, Netherlands
- Height: 1.71 m (5 ft 7 in)
- Position: Midfielder

Team information
- Current team: ADO '20
- Number: 6

Youth career
- –2007: SV De Foresters
- 2007–2016: AZ

Senior career*
Years	Team	Apps	(Gls)
2016–2019	Cambuur	44	(3)
2019–2020	OFC	12	(4)
2020–2024	ADO '20	83	(10)
2024–2026	IJsselmeervogels	32	(1)
2026–	ADO '20	5	(1)
- * Club domestic league appearances and goals as of 08:40, 25 September 2026 (UTC)

Daan Boerlage (born 7 August 1997) is a Dutch footballer who plays as a midfielder for Derde Divisie club ADO '20.

== Club career ==
He made his professional debut in the Eerste Divisie for SC Cambuur on 28 January 2017 in a game against FC Dordrecht. After a spell at OFC, he moved to ADO '20 in summer 2020. On 18 December 2023, IJsselmeervogels announced Boerlage as their first new signing for the 2024–25 season. There, he was appointed team captain for the team, that had been recently relegated to the Derde Divisie. On 11 February 2025, he extended his contract with IJsselmeervogels by one year.
