= De Vliert =

Soccer stadium in the Netherlands

Coordinates: 51°42′06″N 5°19′47″E

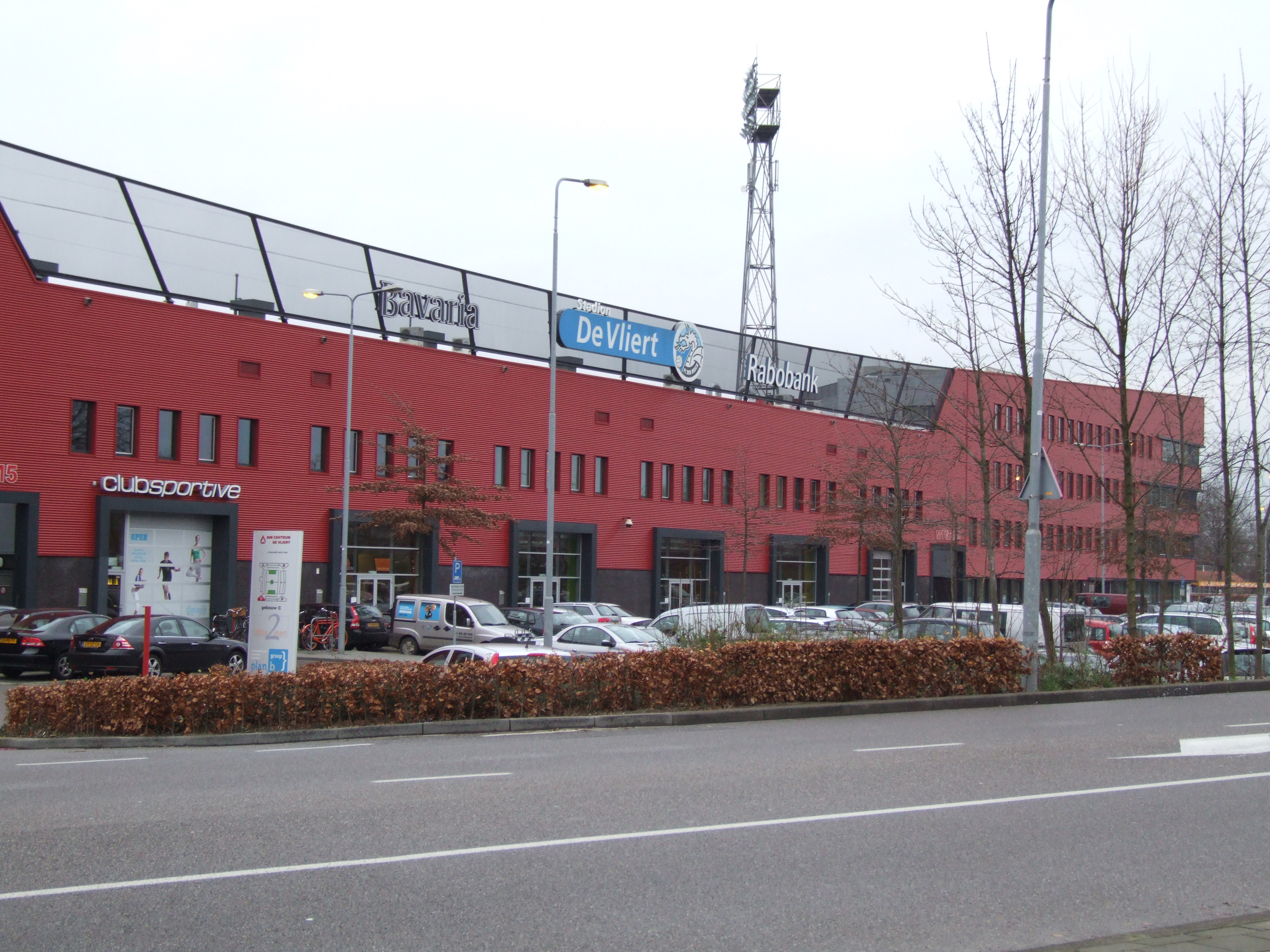
De Vliert

De Vliert (Dutch pronunciation: [də ˈvliːrt]) is a multi-use stadium in 's-Hertogenbosch, Netherlands. It is currently used mostly for football matches and is the home stadium of FC Den Bosch. The original stadium was built in 1951, included an athletics track and had at its heyday a capacity of 30,000, making it one of the largest stadiums in the Netherlands. The old stadium was replaced previously in 1997 by the new stadium, which saw the field rotated 90° and is currently able to hold 8,500 people. The grandstands are partially heated by infrared heaters to provide comfort to spectators.

Plans include the replacement of the East stand by a new main stand, and a renewed West stand. The main goal is to increase the commercial space of the stadium and support the clubs ambition to play the Eredivisie football league in the Netherlands. Additional expansion room is available in the open corners, giving the stadium a maximum capacity of 13,500
