= Darren Rosheuvel =

Dutch footballer (born 1994)

Personal information
- Full name: Darren Etto Rosheuvel
- Date of birth: 15 May 1994 (age 32)
- Place of birth: Amsterdam, Netherlands
- Height: 1.77 m (5 ft 9 1/2 in)
- Position: Defensive midfielder

Team information
- Current team: Ajax Amateurs
- Number: 8

Youth career
- –2004: SC Oriënt
- 2004–2005: SC Nieuwendam
- 2005–2008: Haarlem
- 2008–2013: Ajax
- 2013–2015: Utrecht

Senior career*
Years	Team	Apps	(Gls)
2015–2017	Utrecht	4	(0)
2016–2017	Jong Utrecht	26	(4)
2017–2018	Cambuur	11	(1)
2018–2019	Telstar	11	(0)
2019–2021	Wooter Academy		
2021–2023	IJsselmeervogels	43	(1)
2023–	Ajax Amateurs		

International career
2011	Netherlands U17	1	(0)
- * Club domestic league appearances and goals as of 7 October 2024

Darren Rosheuvel (born 15 May 1994) is a Dutch professional footballer who plays as a defensive midfielder for Ajax Amateurs. Rosheuvel is of Surinamese descent.
