= Martijn Barto =

Dutch professional footballer

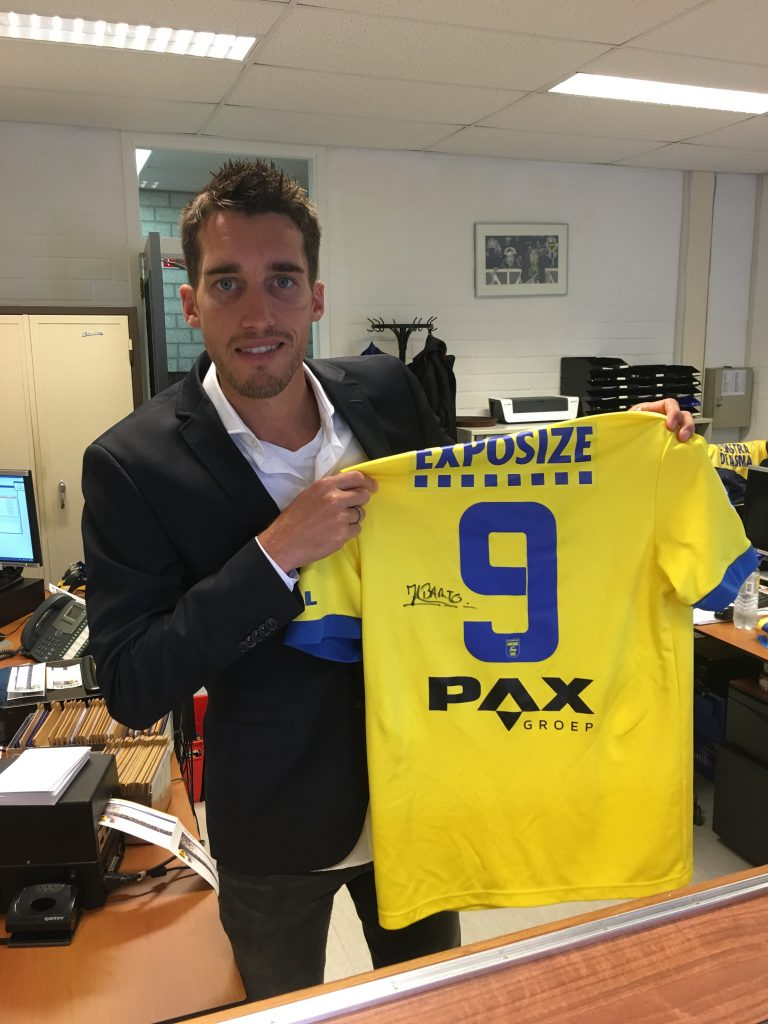

Personal information
- Full name: Martijn Barto
- Date of birth: 23 August 1984 (age 42)
- Place of birth: Spijkenisse, Netherlands
- Height: 1.85 m (6 ft 1 in)
- Position: Striker

Youth career
- VV Spijkenisse
- 1999–2005: Heerenveen

Senior career*
Years	Team	Apps	(Gls)
2005–2006	RKC	7	(0)
2006–2007	Helmond Sport	35	(4)
2007–2011	Harkemase Boys	30	(15)
2011–2018	Cambuur	212	(55)
2018–2019	ONS Sneek	24	(9)
2019–2021	Blauw Wit '34	21	(5)
Total		329	(88)
- * Club domestic league appearances and goals as of 29 March 2021

Martijn Barto (born 23 August 1984) is a Dutch retired footballer who played as a striker.

== Club career ==
He formerly played professional football for RKC Waalwijk and Helmond Sport. After he had played four years for amateur side Harkemase Boys, he returned in professional football in July 2011, when he signed a two-year deal with SC Cambuur. Barto won the Eerste Divisie title with the club in May 2013 and thus returned to the Eredivisie after having played there eight years earlier. In May 2016, he suffered relegation with Cambuur from the Eredivisie.

In the 2018–19 season he went to play for ONS Sneek in the Derde Divisie. Ahead of the 2019–20 season, he moved to CVV Blauw Wit '34 in the Eerste Klasse.

== Coaching career ==
As of 1 January 2019, Barto worked as a part-time coach at the youth academy and he is involved in commercial and social affairs within SC Cambuur.

Before the 2019–20 season, as a player of CVV Blauw Wit '34, he would also be active as an assistant coach of the first team. [2] Additionally, he joined the Cambuur first-team staff, where he would work part-time as a striker coach in addition to his part-time work in the youth academy and the commercial department.

== Honours ==
=== Club ===
Cambuur

- Eerste Divisie: 2012–13
