= Kevin van Kippersluis =

Dutch footballer (born 1993)

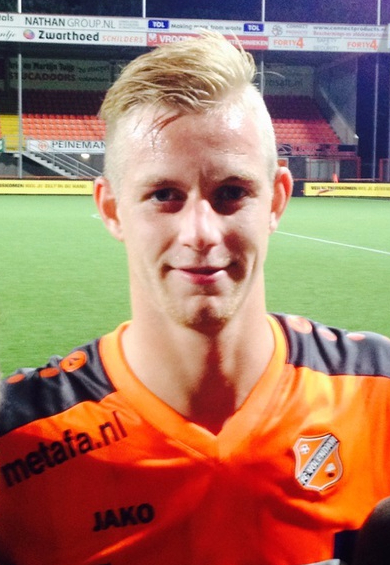
- van Kippersluis playing for Volendam

Personal information
- Full name: Kevin van Kippersluis
- Date of birth: 30 June 1993 (age 33)
- Place of birth: Hilversum, Netherlands
- Height: 1.89 m (6 ft 2 in)
- Positions: Winger; attacking midfielder

Team information
- Current team: HSV Wasmeer

Youth career
- HSV Wasmeer
- Ajax
- Utrecht

Senior career*
Years	Team	Apps	(Gls)
2012–2014	Jong Utrecht	34	(14)
2014	→ Excelsior (loan)	7	(0)
2014–2017	Volendam	100	(20)
2017–2019	Cambuur	62	(16)
2019	Persib Bandung	15	(2)
2020	Badajoz	1	(0)
2020	AFC Eskilstuna	1	(0)
2020–2021	Go Ahead Eagles	7	(0)
2021	THOI Lakatamia	12	(5)
2021–2022	Quick Boys	24	(3)
2022–2023	TEC	26	(2)
2023–2024	Ajax Amateurs		
2024–	HSV Wasmeer		
- * Club domestic league appearances and goals

Kevin van Kippersluis (born 30 June 1993) is a Dutch professional footballer who plays as a winger or attacking midfielder for HSV Wasmeer. Besides the Netherlands, he has played in Indonesia, Spain, and Sweden.
