= Omar el Baad =

Dutch footballer (born 1996)

Personal information
- Date of birth: 1 February 1996 (age 30)
- Place of birth: The Hague, Netherlands
- Height: 1.79 m (5 ft 10 in)
- Position: Right-back

Team information
- Current team: Lisse
- Number: 2

Youth career
- –2004: FC Zoetermeer
- 2004–2015: Feyenoord
- 2015: Cambuur

Senior career*
Years	Team	Apps	(Gls)
2015–2019	Cambuur	33	(0)
2019	Umeå FC	19	(0)
2020–2023	Excelsior Maassluis	71	(0)
2023–2024	Katwijk	6	(0)
2024–	Lisse	22	(2)
- * Club domestic league appearances and goals as of 15:27, 4 August 2025 (UTC)

Omar el Baad (born 1 February 1996) is a Dutch professional footballer who plays as a right-back for Derde Divisie club Lisse. He also holds Moroccan citizenship.

== Club career ==
He made his professional debut in the Eredivisie for SC Cambuur on 27 November 2015 in a game against De Graafschap. In February 2026, el Baad extended his contract with FC Lisse with another year.
