= 2019–20 SC Cambuur season =

Dutch football club season

SC Cambuur
2019–20 season
- Stadium: Kooi Stadion
- Eerste Divisie: 1st
- KNVB Cup: 2nd round
- Top goalscorer: League: Robert Mühren (26 goals); All: Robert Mühren (26 goals)
- Highest home attendance: 10,000 (KNVB Cup 2nd round)
- Lowest home attendance: 7,242 (Week 4)
- Average home league attendance: 8,387
- Biggest win: 5-0 (Go Ahead Eagles (h) 2nd week VV Goes (a) KNVB Cup 1st round)
- Biggest defeat: 2-0 (De Graafschap (a) 1st week Jong Ajax (h) 19th week)
- All statistics correct as of 13 December 2025.

The 2019–20 season was SC Cambuur's 48th season in the Eerste Divisie (4th consecutive). Due to the COVID-19 pandemic, the 2019-20 Eerste Divisie season was abandoned with SC Cambuur in 1st place.

The club also competed in the KNVB Cup, where they were eliminated in the second round following a 2–1 defeat to Feyenoord.

Robert Mühren was the top scorer of the club in this season with 26 goals in Eerste Divisie.

Mees Hoedemakers and Sonny Stevens were the most appeared players in this season with 31 appearances; 29 appearances in the Eerste Divisie and 2 appearances in the KNVB Cup.

== Players ==
=== First-team squad ===
Note: Flags indicate national team as defined under FIFA eligibility rules; some limited exceptions apply. Players may hold more than one non-FIFA nationality.

| No. | Pos. | Nation | Player |
|---|---|---|---|
| 1 | GK | NED | Sonny Stevens |
| 2 | MF | NED | Jordy van Deelen |
| 3 | DF | SUR | Calvin Mac-Intosch |
| 4 | DF | NED | Erik Schouten |
| 5 | DF | NED | Doke Schmidt |
| 6 | MF | NED | Mees Hoedemakers |
| 7 | FW | SLE | Issa Kallon |
| 8 | MF | NED | Jamie Jacobs |
| 10 | MF | NED | Mitchell Paulissen |
| 11 | FW | NED | Giovanni Korte |
| 14 | MF | NED | Michael Breij |
| 15 | DF | NED | Kellian van der Kaap |

| No. | Pos. | Nation | Player |
|---|---|---|---|
| 16 | DF | SLE | Alex Bangura |
| 18 | MF | NED | Stanley Akoy |
| 19 | DF | NED | Sven Nieuwpoort |
| 20 | DF | FRA | Robin Maulun |
| 21 | FW | NED | Robert Mühren |
| 22 | FW | NED | Delano Ladan |
| 24 | FW | GAB | David Sambissa |
| 25 | DF | NED | Milan van Ewijk |
| 26 | FW | IDN | Ragnar Oratmangoen |
| 27 | FW | CUW | Jarchinio Antonia |
| 30 | MF | ENG | George McEachran |

== Transfers ==
=== In ===
| Pos. | Player | Transferred from | Fee | Date |
|---|---|---|---|---|
| DF | (Suriname) Calvin Mac-Intosch | (Netherlands) Fortuna Sittard | Free | 1 July 2019 |
| MF | (Netherlands) Jamie Jacobs | (Netherlands) Jong AZ | | 1 July 2019 |
| DF | (Netherlands) Kellian van der Kaap | (Netherlands) Jong Groningen | Free | 1 July 2019 |
| MF | (Netherlands) Mees Hoedemakers | (Netherlands) AZ Alkmaar | On loan | 1 July 2019 |
| MF | (Netherlands) Mitchel Paulissen | (Netherlands) Roda JC Kerkrade | Free | 1 July 2019 |
| FW | (Netherlands) Robert Mühren | (Belgium) SV Zulte Waregem | On loan | 5 July 2019 |
| DF | (Netherlands) Erik Schouten | (Netherlands) FC Volendam | Free | 12 July 2019 |
| FW | (Netherlands) Giovanni Korte | (Netherlands) NAC Breda | Free | 15 July 2019 |
| DF | (Netherlands) Doke Schmidt | (Netherlands) SC Heerenveen | Free | 23 July 2019 |
| GK | (Netherlands) Sonny Stevens | (Netherlands) Excelsior Rotterdam | Free | 23 July 2019 |
| FW | (Indonesia) Ragnar Oratmangoen | (Netherlands) NEC Nijmegen | Free | 24 July 2019 |
| FW | (Netherlands) Delano Ladan | (Netherlands) ADO Den Haag | Free | 5 August 2019 |
| DF | (Netherlands) Sven Nieuwpoort | (Netherlands) De Graafschap | Free | 28 August 2019 |
| FW | (Curaçao) Jarchinio Antonia | (Cyprus) AEL Limassol | Free | 2 September 2019 |
| FW | (Netherlands) Michael Breij | (Netherlands) FC Groningen | | 1 January 2020 |
| MF | (England) George McEachran | (England) Chelsea U23 | On loan | 30 January 2020 |
| DF | (Netherlands) Milan van Ewijk | (Netherlands) ADO Den Haag | On loan | 31 January 2020 |

=== Out ===
| Pos. | Player | Transferred to | Fee | Date |
|---|---|---|---|---|
| FW | (Netherlands) Sam Hendriks | (Belgium) Oud-Heverlee Leuven | End of loan | 30 June 2019 |
| DF | (Latvia) Andrejs Cigaņiks | (Latvia) FK RFS | Free | 1 July 2019 |
| MF | (Netherlands) Julian Calor | (Netherlands) SV TEC | Free | 1 July 2019 |
| MF | (Germany) Kevin Schindler | No club | | 1 July 2019 |
| MF | (Uruguay) Matías Jones | No club | | 1 July 2019 |
| DF | (Netherlands) Robbert Schilder | No club | | 1 July 2019 |
| DF | (Netherlands) Robert van Koesveld | (Netherlands) SVV Scheveningen | Free | 1 July 2019 |
| GK | (Netherlands) Xavier Mous | (Netherlands) PEC Zwolle | €600,000 | 1 July 2019 |
| DF | (Netherlands) Matthew Steenvoorden | (Croatia) HNK Gorica | Free | 8 July 2019 |
| DF | (Japan) Sai van Wermeskerken | (Netherlands) PEC Zwolle | Free | 9 July 2019 |
| FW | (Suriname) Tyrone Conraad | (Netherlands) Kozakken Boys | Free | 20 July 2019 |
| FW | (Curaçao) Nigel Robertha | (Bulgaria) PFC Levski Sofia | | 24 July 2019 |
| MF | (Netherlands) Kevin Jansen | (Iran) Gol Gohar Sirjan F.C. | Free | 5 August 2019 |
| DF | (Cameroon) Emmanuel Mbende | (Italy) Catania FC | Free | 8 August 2019 |
| FW | (Netherlands) Kevin van Kippersluis | (Indonesia) Persib Bandung | Free | 15 August 2019 |
| MF | (Netherlands) Nino van den Beemt | (Netherlands) Excelsior Maassluis | Free | 30 August 2019 |
| MF | (Netherlands) Daan Boerlage | (Netherlands) OFC Oostzaan | Free | 1 September 2019 |

== Competitions ==
=== Overall record ===
| Competition | First match | Last match | Starting round | Final position | Record | | | | | | | |
| Competition | First match | Last match | Starting round | Final position | Pld | W | D | L | GF | GA | GD | Win % |
|---|---|---|---|---|---|---|---|---|---|---|---|---|
| Eerste Divisie | 9 August 2019 | 9 March 2020 | Week 1 | 1st | 29 | 21 | 3 | 5 | 68 | 25 | +43 | 72.41 |
| KNVB Cup | 29 October 2018 | 19 December 2019 | 1st round | 2nd round | 2 | 1 | 0 | 1 | 6 | 2 | +4 | 50.00 |
| Total | | | | | 31 | 22 | 3 | 6 | 74 | 27 | +47 | 70.97 |

Source: ESPN

=== Eerste Divisie ===
==== League table ====
| Pos | Team | Pld | W | D | L | GF | GA | GD | Pts |
|---|---|---|---|---|---|---|---|---|---|
| 1 | SC Cambuur | 29 | 21 | 3 | 5 | 68 | 25 | +43 | 66 |
| 2 | De Graafschap (Note: Winner of the Third Period (games 20-28).) | 29 | 17 | 11 | 1 | 63 | 28 | +35 | 62 |
| 3 | FC Volendam (Note: Winner of the Second Period (games 10-19).) | 29 | 16 | 7 | 6 | 57 | 42 | +15 | 55 |
| 4 | Jong Ajax (Note: Reserves teams are not eligible to be promoted to the 2020–21 Eredivisie.) | 29 | 16 | 6 | 7 | 72 | 47 | +25 | 54 |
| 5 | NAC Breda (Note: Winner of the First Period (games 1-9).) | 29 | 14 | 8 | 7 | 48 | 30 | +18 | 50 |

Updated to match(es) played on 9 March 2020. Source: Soccerway, Keuken Kampioen Divisie (in Dutch)
Rules for classification: Season in progress: 1) Most points won; 2) Fewest points lost; 3) Goal difference; 4) Goals scored; 5) Alphabetical order; End of season: 1) Points; 2) Goal difference; 3) Goals scored; 4) Head-to-head points; 5) Head-to-head goal difference; 6) Head-to-head away goals scored; 7) Play-off if relevant for deciding champion, relegation or participating in a European league, otherwise by draw. 8) Penalty shoot-out (only after a play-off)

==== Results summary ====
| Overall | | | | | | | | Home | | | | | | Away | | | | | |
| Pld | W | D | L | GF | GA | GD | Pts | W | D | L | GF | GA | GD | W | D | L | GF | GA | GD |
|---|---|---|---|---|---|---|---|---|---|---|---|---|---|---|---|---|---|---|---|
| 29 | 21 | 3 | 5 | 68 | 25 | +43 | 66 | 11 | 1 | 2 | 40 | 17 | +23 | 10 | 2 | 3 | 28 | 8 | +20 |

Source: https://www.espn.nl/voetbal/team/scorebord/_/id/3736/season/2019

==== Results by round ====
| Round | 1 | 2 | 3 | 4 | 5 | 6 | 7 | 8 | 9 | 10 | 11 | 12 | 13 | 14 | 15 | 16 | 17 | 18 | 19 | 20 | 21 | 22 | 23 | 24 | 25 | 26 | 27 | 28 | 29 |
|---|---|---|---|---|---|---|---|---|---|---|---|---|---|---|---|---|---|---|---|---|---|---|---|---|---|---|---|---|---|
| Ground | A | H | A | H | A | H | A | A | H | A | H | A | H | A | H | A | H | A | H | A | H | A | H | A | H | A | H | H | A |
| Result | L | W | L | W | W | W | W | W | W | D | W | D | D | W | W | W | W | W | L | W | L | L | W | W | W | W | W | W | W |
| Position | | | | | | | | | | | | | | | | | | | | | | | | | | | | | 1 |

Source: ESPN
A = Away; H = Home; W = Win; D = Draw; L = Loss

=== Matches ===
==== 1st half ====
| 9 August 2019 1st week | De Graafschap | 2-0 | SC Cambuur | Doetinchem |
| 20:00 | Youssef El Jebli 45+2' (pen.); Calvin Mac-Intosch 51' (o.g.) | Report | | Stadium: De Vijverberg; Attendance: 9,702 |

| 16 August 2019 2nd week | SC Cambuur | 5-0 | Go Ahead Eagles | Leeuwarden |
| 20:00 | Robert Mühren 9' (pen.) 51'; Erik Schouten 36'; Jamie Jacobs 71'; Ragnar Oratmangoen 89' | Report | | Stadium: Cambuur Stadion; Attendance: 7,531 |

| 23 August 2019 3rd week | NAC Breda | 1-0 | SC Cambuur | Breda |
| 20:00 | Ivan Ilic 67' | Report | | Stadium: Rat Verlegh Stadion; Attendance: 16,434 |

| 30 August 2019 4th week | SC Cambuur | 3-2 | Den Bosch | Leeuwarden |
| 20:00 | Jamie Jacobs 6'; Robert Mühren 68' (pen.) 71' | Report | Danny Verbeek 29' 77' | Stadium: Cambuur Stadion; Attendance: 7,242 |

| 7 September 2019 5th week | SC Telstar | 0-2 | SC Cambuur | Velsen-Zuid |
| 18:30 | | Report | Jamie Jacobs 24'; Alex Bangura 85' | Stadium: BUKO Stadion; Attendance: 2,685 |

| 13 September 2019 6th week | SC Cambuur | 5-1 | Helmond Sport | Leeuwarden |
| 20:00 | Robert Mühren 19'; Jamie Jacobs 29'; Ragnar Oratmangoen 33'; Robin Maulun 48'; Delano Ladan 90' (pen.) | Report | Orhan Džepar 69' | Stadium: Cambuur Stadion; Attendance: 7,432 |

| 23 September 2019 7th week | Jong PSV | 0-1 | SC Cambuur | Eindhoven |
| 20:00 | | Report | Calvin Mac-Intosch 66' | Stadium: De Herdgang; Attendance: 398 |

| 27 September 2019 8th week | FC Volendam | 0-4 | SC Cambuur | Volendam |
| 20:00 | | Report | Jamie Jacobs 14'; Robert Mühren 19' (pen.) 45+1' 72' | Stadium: Kras Stadion; Attendance: 4,041 |

| 4 October 2019 9th week | SC Cambuur | 4-0 | Excelsior Rotterdam | Leeuwarden |
| 20:00 | Jamie Jacobs 23'; Jordy van Deelen 31'; Ragnar Oratmangoen 42'; Jarchinio Antonia 42' | Report | | Stadium: Cambuur Stadion; Attendance: 8,742 |

| 11 October 2019 10th week | MVV Maastricht | 0-0 | SC Cambuur | Maastricht |
| 20:45 | | Report | | Stadium: De Geusselt; Attendance: 3,372 |

| 18 October 2019 11th week | SC Cambuur | 5-1 | TOP Oss | Leeuwarden |
| 20:00 | Issa Kallon 10' 49' 73' 79'; Robert Mühren 45+1' | Report | Lars Hutten 90+2' | Stadium: Cambuur Stadion; Attendance: 8,243 |

| 25 October 2019 12th week | Jong FC Utrecht | 1-1 | SC Cambuur | Utrecht |
| 20:00 | Mitchell van Rooijen 61' | Report | Robert Mühren 69' (pen.) | Stadium: Sportcomplex Zoudenbalch; Attendance: 566 |

| 1 November 2019 13th week | SC Cambuur | 0-0 | NEC Nijmegen | Leeuwarden |
| 20:00 | | Report | | Stadium: Cambuur Stadion; Attendance: 8,675 |

| 8 November 2019 14th week | Roda JC Kerkrade | 1-2 | SC Cambuur | Kerkrade |
| 20:00 | Ike Ugbo 33' | Report | Jamie Jacobs 4'; Robert Mühren 77' | Stadium: Parkstad Limburg Stadion; Attendance: 6,000 |

| 17 November 2019 15th week | SC Cambuur | 3-1 | Almere City FC | Leeuwarden |
| 16:45 | Robert Mühren 16'; Jamie Jacobs 34' 60' | Report | Shayon Harrison 75' | Stadium: Cambuur Stadion; Attendance: 9,264 |

| 22 November 2019 16th | FC Eindhoven | 0-3 | SC Cambuur | Eindhoven |
| 20:00 | | Report | Calvin Mac-Intosch 46'; Robert Mühren 51'; Mitchell Paulissen 68' | Stadium: Jan Louwers Stadion; Attendance: 2,192 |

| 29 November 2019 17th week | SC Cambuur | 3-1 | Jong AZ | Leeuwarden |
| 20:00 | Stanley Akoy 19'; Issa Kallon 21'; Robert Mühren 76' | Report | Felix Correia 3' | Stadium: Cambuur Stadion; Attendance: 7,532 |

| 6 December 2019 18th week | FC Dordrecht | 2-4 | SC Cambuur | Dordrecht |
| 20:00 | Pedro Marques 24' (pen.); Stef Gronsveld 89' | Report | Robin Maulun 22' 43'; Mees Hoedemakers 29'; Kellian van der Kaap 39' | Stadium: Stadion Krommedijk; Attendance: 1,578 |

| 13 December 2019 19th week | SC Cambuur | 0-2 | Jong Ajax | Leeuwarden |
| 20:00 | | Report | Brian Brobbey 31'; Sontje Hansen 82' | Stadium: Cambuur Stadion; Attendance: 8,763 |

| 22 December 2019 20th week | Excelsior Rotterdam | 1-3 | SC Cambuur | Rotterdam |
| 14:30 | Rai Vloet 83' | Report | Robert Mühren 11' (pen.); Jamie Jacobs 29'; Issa Kallon 90+1' | Stadium: Stadion Woudestein; Attendance: 3,612 |

==== 2nd half ====
| 10 January 2020 21st week | SC Cambuur | 1-2 | FC Volendam | Leeuwarden |
| 20:00 | Jamie Jacobs 74' | Report | Francesco Antonucci 7'; Derry Murkin 50' | Stadium: Cambuur Stadion; Attendance: 9,163 |

| 17 January 2020 22nd week | TOP Oss | 3-2 | SC Cambuur | Oss |
| 20:00 | Philippe Rommens 21' (pen.); Rick Stuy van den Herik 25' 60' | Report | Henk Dijkhuizen 7' (o.g.); Robert Mühren 37' | Stadium: Frans Heesen Stadion; Attendance: 1,709 |

| 24 January 2020 23rd week | SC Cambuur | 3-1 | Jong FC Utrecht | Leeuwarden |
| 20:00 | Robin Maulun 28'; Ragnar Oratmangoen 63'; Robert Mühren 81' | Report | Giovanni de la Vega 40' | Stadium: Cambuur Stadion; Attendance: 8,265 |

| 31 January 2020 24th week | NEC Nijmegen | 0-2 | SC Cambuur | Nijmegen |
| 20:00 | | Report | Robert Mühren 57' (pen.) 77' | Stadium: Goffertstadion; Attendance: 8,235 |

| 7 February 2020 25th week | SC Cambuur | 2-1 | MVV Maastricht | Leeuwarden |
| 20:00 | Robert Mühren 17' 19' (pen.) | Report | Joeri Schroyen 65' | Stadium: Cambuur Stadion; Attendance: 8,174 |

| 14 February 2020 26th week | Almere City FC | 0-1 | SC Cambuur | Almere |
| 20:00 | | Report | Giovanni Korte 58' | Stadium: Yanmar Stadion; Attendance: 2,840 |

| 21 February 2020 27th week | SC Cambuur | 2-0 | Roda JC Kerkrade | Leeuwarden |
| 20:00 | Robert Mühren 29'; Michael Breij 47' | Report | | Stadium: Cambuur Stadion; Attendance: 8,421 |

| 28 February 2020 28th week | SC Cambuur | 4-2 | Jong PSV | Leeuwarden |
| 20:00 | Robert Mühren 6' 86' (pen.); Michael Breij 49'; Jamie Jacobs 72' | Report | Noni Madueke 38'; Yorbe Vertessen 58' | Stadium: Cambuur Stadion; Attendance: 8,362 |

| 9 March 2020 29th week | Jong AZ | 0-3 | SC Cambuur | The Hague |
| 20:00 | | Report | Robert Mühren 19' 35'; Michael Breij 90+4' | Stadium: AFAS Trainingscomplex; Attendance: 700 |

=== KNVB Cup ===
| 29 October 2019 1st round | VV Goes | 0-5 | SC Cambuur | Goes |
| 19:45 | | Report | Delano Ladan 37' (pen.) 77' 80'; Stanley Akoy 54'; Calvin Mac-Intosch 68' | Attendance: 1,000 |

| 19 December 2019 2nd round | SC Cambuur | 1-2 | Feyenoord | Leeuwarden |
| 20:45 | Robin Maulun 75' (pen.) | Report | Steven Berghuis 67'; Doke Schmidt 87' (o.g.) | Stadium: Kooi Stadion; Attendance: 10,000 |

== Statistics ==
=== Scorers ===
| # | Player | Eerste Divisie | KNVB | Total |
|---|---|---|---|---|
| 1 | (Netherlands) Robert Mühren | 26 | 0 | 26 |
| 2 | (Netherlands) Jamie Jacobs | 12 | 0 | 12 |
| 3 | (Sierra Leone) Issa Kallon | 6 | 0 | 6 |
| 4 | (France) Robin Maulun | 4 | 1 | 5 |
| 5 | (Netherlands) Delano Ladan | 1 | 3 | 4 |
| 5 | (Indonesia) Ragnar Oratmangoen | 4 | 0 | 4 |
| 7 | (Suriname) Calvin Mac-Intosch | 2 | 1 | 3 |
| 7 | (Netherlands) Michael Breij | 3 | 0 | 3 |
| 9 | (Netherlands) Stanley Akoy | 1 | 1 | 2 |
| 10 | (Sierra Leone) Alex Bangura | 1 | 0 | 1 |
| 10 | (Netherlands) Erik Schouten | 1 | 0 | 1 |
| 10 | (Netherlands) Giovanni Korte | 1 | 0 | 1 |
| 10 | (Curaçao) Jarchinio Antonia | 1 | 0 | 1 |
| 10 | (Netherlands) Jordy van Deelen | 1 | 0 | 1 |
| 10 | (Netherlands) Kellian van der Kaap | 1 | 0 | 1 |
| 10 | (Netherlands) Mees Hoedemakers | 1 | 0 | 1 |
| 10 | (Netherlands) Mitchell Paulissen | 1 | 0 | 1 |

=== Appearances ===
| # | Player | Eerste Divisie | KNVB | Total |
|---|---|---|---|---|
| 1 | (Netherlands) Mees Hoedemakers | 29 | 2 | 31 |
| 1 | (Netherlands) Sonny Stevens | 29 | 2 | 31 |
| 3 | (Suriname) Calvin Mac-Intosch | 28 | 2 | 30 |
| 4 | (Gabon) David Sambissa | 28 | 1 | 29 |
| 4 | (Netherlands) Robert Mühren | 29 | 0 | 29 |
| 6 | (Netherlands) Erik Schouten | 27 | 1 | 28 |
| 7 | (Indonesia) Ragnar Oratmangoen | 25 | 2 | 27 |
| 8 | (France) Robin Maulun | 23 | 2 | 25 |
| 9 | (Netherlands) Jamie Jacobs | 23 | 1 | 24 |
| 10 | (Sierra Leone) Issa Kallon | 22 | 1 | 23 |
| 11 | (Netherlands) Stanley Akoy | 19 | 2 | 21 |
| 12 | (Netherlands) Mitchell Paulissen | 18 | 2 | 20 |
| 13 | (Curaçao) Jarchinio Antonia | 17 | 2 | 19 |
| 14 | (Netherlands) Doke Schmidt | 15 | 2 | 17 |
| 15 | (Netherlands) Delano Ladan | 14 | 2 | 16 |
| 16 | (Netherlands) Jordy van Deelen | 13 | 1 | 14 |
| 17 | (Netherlands) Kellian van der Kaap | 10 | 2 | 12 |
| 18 | (Sierra Leone) Alex Bangura | 10 | 1 | 11 |
| 19 | (Netherlands) Giovanni Korte | 10 | 0 | 10 |
| 20 | (Netherlands) Michael Breij | 8 | 0 | 8 |
| 21 | (Netherlands) Sven Nieuwpoort | 3 | 0 | 3 |
| 22 | (England) George McEachran | 2 | 0 | 2 |
| 22 | (Netherlands) Milan van Ewijk | 2 | 0 | 2 |

=== Clean sheets ===
| # | Player | Eerste Divisie | KNVB | Total |
|---|---|---|---|---|
| 1 | (Netherlands) Sonny Stevens | 12 | 1 | 13 |

=== Disciplinary record ===
| # | Player | Eerste Divisie | | KNVB | | Total | |
| # | Player | Booked | Sent off (straight red) | Booked | Sent off (straight red) | Booked | Sent off (straight red) |
|---|---|---|---|---|---|---|---|
| 1 | (France) Robin Maulun | 3 | 1 | 0 | 0 | 3 | 1 |
| 2 | (Netherlands) Delano Ladan | 0 | 1 | 0 | 0 | 0 | 1 |
| 3 | (Gabon) David Sambissa | 5 | 0 | 0 | 0 | 5 | 0 |
| 4 | (Suriname) Calvin Mac-Intosch | 4 | 0 | 0 | 0 | 4 | 0 |
| 4 | (Sierra Leone) Issa Kallon | 4 | 0 | 0 | 0 | 4 | 0 |
| 4 | (Netherlands) Mees Hoedemakers | 4 | 0 | 0 | 0 | 4 | 0 |
| 7 | (Netherlands) Doke Schmidt | 2 | 0 | 1 | 0 | 3 | 0 |
| 7 | (Netherlands) Erik Schouten | 3 | 0 | 0 | 0 | 3 | 0 |
| 7 | (Netherlands) Kellian van der Kaap | 2 | 0 | 1 | 0 | 3 | 0 |
| 7 | (Netherlands) Stanley Akoy | 2 | 0 | 1 | 0 | 3 | 0 |
| 11 | (Netherlands) Jamie Jacobs | 2 | 0 | 0 | 0 | 2 | 0 |
| 11 | (Netherlands) Jordy van Deelen | 2 | 0 | 0 | 0 | 2 | 0 |
| 11 | (Netherlands) Mitchell Paulissen | 2 | 0 | 0 | 0 | 2 | 0 |
| 14 | (Sierra Leone) Alex Bangura | 0 | 0 | 1 | 0 | 1 | 0 |
| 14 | (Netherlands) Giovanni Korte | 1 | 0 | 0 | 0 | 1 | 0 |
| 14 | (Curaçao) Jarchinio Antonia | 1 | 0 | 0 | 0 | 1 | 0 |
| 14 | (Indonesia) Ragnar Oratmangoen | 1 | 0 | 0 | 0 | 1 | 0 |
| 14 | (Netherlands) Robert Mühren | 1 | 0 | 0 | 0 | 1 | 0 |
