= 2020–21 SC Cambuur season =

Dutch football club season

SC Cambuur
2020–21 season
- Chairman: Vacant
- Manager: Henk de Jong
- Stadium: Cambuur Stadion
- Eerste Divisie: 1st (Note: Promoted to Eredivisie.)
- KNVB Cup: 2nd round
- Top goalscorer: League: Robert Mühren (38 goals); All: Robert Mühren (38 goals)
- Biggest win: 7-1 MVV Maastricht (a) 2nd week
- Biggest defeat: 2-0 Go Ahead Eagles (h) 3rd week 3-1 Roda JC Kerkrade (a) 30th week
- All statistics correct as of 16 December 2025.

The 2020–21 season was SC Cambuur's 49th season in the Eerste Divisie (5th consecutive). SC Cambuur finished the regular season in 1st place and promoted to Eredivisie.

The club also competed in the KNVB Cup, where they were eliminated in the second round following a 2–1 defeat to Go Ahead Eagles.

Robert Mühren was the top scorer of the club in this season with 38 goals in Eerste Divisie.

Mees Hoedemakers and Sonny Stevens were the most appeared players in this season with 39 appearances; 37 appearances in the Eerste Divisie and 2 appearances in the KNVB Cup.

== Players ==
=== First-team squad ===
Note: Flags indicate national team as defined under FIFA eligibility rules; some limited exceptions apply. Players may hold more than one non-FIFA nationality.

| No. | Pos. | Nation | Player |
|---|---|---|---|
| 1 | GK | NED | Sonny Stevens |
| 2 | DF | NED | Jasper ter Heide |
| 3 | DF | NED | Calvin Mac-Intosch |
| 4 | DF | NED | Erik Schouten (captain) |
| 5 | DF | NED | Doke Schmidt |
| 6 | MF | NED | Mees Hoedemakers |
| 7 | FW | SLE | Issa Kallon |
| 8 | MF | NED | Jamie Jacobs |
| 9 | FW | NED | Maarten Pouwels |
| 10 | MF | NED | Mitchel Paulissen |
| 11 | FW | NED | Giovanni Korte |
| 12 | GK | NED | Pieter Bos |
| 14 | MF | NED | Michael Breij |
| 15 | DF | NED | Joris Kramer |

| No. | Pos. | Nation | Player |
|---|---|---|---|
| 15 | DF | NED | Kellian van der Kaap |
| 16 | DF | SLE | Alex Bangura |
| 17 | DF | NED | Nick Doodeman |
| 19 | DF | NED | Sven Nieuwpoort |
| 20 | MF | FRA | Robin Maulun |
| 21 | FW | NED | Robert Mühren |
| 22 | FW | NED | Delano Ladan |
| 24 | DF | GAB | David Sambissa |
| 26 | FW | IDN | Ragnar Oratmangoen |
| 27 | FW | CUW | Jarchinio Antonia |
| 36 | MF | NED | Mees Gootjes |
| 38 | MF | NED | Stefan Deuling |
| 44 | DF | HAI | Jhondly van der Meer |
| 51 | MF | NED | Dylan Smit |

== Transfers ==
=== In ===
| Pos. | Player | Transferred from | Fee | Date |
|---|---|---|---|---|
| DF | (Netherlands) Joris Kramer | (Netherlands) AZ Alkmaar | On loan | 10 June 2020 |
| MF | (Netherlands) Jasper ter Heide | (Netherlands) AFC Ajax U21 | | 7 July 2020 |
| FW | (Netherlands) Maarten Pouwels | (Netherlands) Go Ahead Eagles | Free | 8 November 2020 |
| FW | (Netherlands) Nick Doodeman | (Netherlands) FC Volendam | | 2 January 2021 |

=== Out ===
| Pos. | Player | Transferred to | Fee | Date |
|---|---|---|---|---|
| DF | (Netherlands) Jordy van Deelen | No club | | 1 July 2020 |
| DF | (Netherlands) Kellian van der Kaap | (Israel) Maccabi Netanya F.C. | €50,000 | 28 September 2020 |

== Competitions ==
=== Overall record ===
| Competition | First match | Last match | Starting round | Final position | Record | | | | | | | |
| Competition | First match | Last match | Starting round | Final position | Pld | W | D | L | GF | GA | GD | Win % |
|---|---|---|---|---|---|---|---|---|---|---|---|---|
| Eerste Divisie | 28 August 2020 | 12 May 2021 | Matchday 1 | Winners | 38 | 29 | 5 | 4 | 109 | 36 | +73 | 76.32 |
| KNVB Cup | 28 October 2020 | 17 December 2020 | First round | Second round | 2 | 0 | 1 | 1 | 3 | 4 | −1 | 0.00 |
| Total | | | | | 40 | 29 | 6 | 5 | 112 | 40 | +72 | 72.50 |

Last updated: 12 May 2021
Source: Soccerway

=== Eerste Divisie ===
==== League table ====
| Pos | Team | Pld | W | D | L | GF | GA | GD | Pts | Promotion or qualification |
|---|---|---|---|---|---|---|---|---|---|---|
| 1 | SC Cambuur (Note: Winner of the First, Second and Fourth Period (rounds 1–9, 10–19 and 29–38).) (C, P) | 38 | 29 | 5 | 4 | 109 | 36 | +73 | 92 | Champion and promotion to the Eredivisie |
| 2 | Go Ahead Eagles (P) | 38 | 23 | 8 | 7 | 62 | 25 | +37 | 77 | Promotion to the Eredivisie |
| 3 | De Graafschap (Note: Winner of the Third Period (rounds 20–28).) | 38 | 23 | 8 | 7 | 67 | 47 | +20 | 77 | Qualification to promotion play-offs |
| 4 | Almere City FC | 38 | 22 | 9 | 7 | 75 | 48 | +27 | 75 | Qualification to promotion play-offs |
| 5 | NAC Breda | 38 | 22 | 7 | 9 | 75 | 41 | +34 | 73 | Qualification to promotion play-offs |

Source: Soccerway, Keuken Kampioen Divisie (in Dutch)
Rules for classification: Season in progress: 1) Most points won; 2) Less points lost; 3) Goal difference; 4) Goals scored; 5) Alphabetical order; End of season: 1) Points; 2) Goal difference; 3) Goals scored; 4) Head-to-head points; 5) Head-to-head goal difference; 6) Head-to-head away goals scored; 7) Play-off if relevant for deciding champion, relegation or participating in a European league, otherwise by draw. 8) Penalty shoot-out (only after a play-off)
(C) Champions; (P) Promoted

==== Results summary ====
| Overall | | | | | | | | Home | | | | | | Away | | | | | |
| Pld | W | D | L | GF | GA | GD | Pts | W | D | L | GF | GA | GD | W | D | L | GF | GA | GD |
|---|---|---|---|---|---|---|---|---|---|---|---|---|---|---|---|---|---|---|---|
| 38 | 29 | 5 | 4 | 109 | 36 | +73 | 92 | 15 | 1 | 3 | 60 | 19 | +41 | 14 | 4 | 1 | 49 | 17 | +32 |

Last updated: August 2020.
Source: Divisie.nl/nl-nl/Stand Eerste Divisie

==== Results by round ====
| Round | 1 | 2 | 3 | 4 | 5 | 6 | 7 | 8 | 9 | 10 | 11 | 12 | 13 | 14 | 15 | 16 | 17 | 18 | 19 | 20 | 21 | 22 | 23 | 24 | 25 | 26 | 27 | 28 | 29 | 30 | 31 | 32 | 33 | 34 | 35 | 36 | 37 | 38 |
|---|---|---|---|---|---|---|---|---|---|---|---|---|---|---|---|---|---|---|---|---|---|---|---|---|---|---|---|---|---|---|---|---|---|---|---|---|---|---|
| Ground | H | A | H | A | H | A | H | A | H | A | H | H | A | H | A | H | A | A | H | A | H | H | A | H | A | A | H | A | H | A | A | H | A | H | A | H | A | H |
| Result | W | W | L | D | W | W | W | W | W | W | L | W | W | W | W | W | W | W | L | D | W | W | D | W | W | W | W | D | W | L | W | W | W | W | W | D | W | W |
| Position | | | | | | | | | | | | | | | | | | | | | | | | | | | | | | | | | | | | | | 1 |

Updated to match(es) played on May 2021. Source: Eerste Divisie
A = Away; H = Home; W = Win; D = Draw; L = Loss

=== Matches ===
The league fixtures were announced on 28 July 2020.

==== 1st half ====
| 28 August 2020 1st week | SC Cambuur | 2–0 | NEC Nijmegen | Leeuwarden |
| 21:00 | Sven Nieuwpoort 50'; Robert Mühren 75' (pen.) | Report | | Stadium: Cambuur Stadion; Referee: 2,500 |

| 5 September 2020 2nd week | MVV Maastricht | 1–7 | SC Cambuur | Maastricht |
| 18:45 | Joeri Schroyen 45+2' | Report | Robin Maulun 19'; Mees Hoedemakers 22'; Robert Mühren 27' 38'; Jamie Jacobs 51'; Jarchinio Antonia 67' 76' | Stadium: De Geusselt; Attendance: 1,437 |

| 11 September 2020 3rd week | SC Cambuur | 0–2 | Go Ahead Eagles | Leeuwarden |
| 21:00 | | Report | Jeroen Veldmate 7'; Bradly van Hoeven 46' | Stadium: Cambuur Stadion; Attendance: 2,650 |

| 19 September 2020 4th week | TOP Oss | 2–2 | SC Cambuur | Oss |
| 16:30 | Olivier Rommens 7'; Jarni Koorman 59' | Report | Ragnar Oratmangoen 42'; Robert Mühren 45' (pen.) | Stadium: Frans Heesen Stadion; Attendance: 681 |

| 25 September 2020 5th week | SC Cambuur | 5–2 | Jong FC Utrecht | Leeuwarden |
| 21:00 | Issa Kallon 40' 45' 54' 86'; Michael Breij 48' | Report | Jeredy Hilterman 83'; Tim Pieters 90+1' | Stadium: Cambuur Stadion; Attendance: 2,450 |

| 6 October 2020 6th week | Helmond Sport | 1–5 | SC Cambuur | Helmond |
| 21:00 | Alec Van Hoorenbeeck 43' | Report | Jamie Jacobs 57' 59'; Issa Kallon 66'; Robert Mühren 70'; Mitchell Paulissen 75' | Stadium: Stadion De Braak |

| 11 October 2020 7th week | SC Cambuur | 5–0 | FC Dordrecht | Leeuwarden |
| 14:30 | Robert Mühren 19' (pen.) 22'; Michael Breij 33'; Giovanni Korte 71' 90+2' | Report | | Stadium: Cambuur Stadion |

| 20 October 2020 8th week | NAC Breda | 0–4 | SC Cambuur | Breda |
| 18:45 | | Report | Giovanni Korte 38' 77'; Mitchell Paulissen 59'; Jamie Jacobs 90+1' | Stadium: Rat Verlegh Stadion |

| 23 October 2020 9th week | SC Cambuur | 3–0 | Roda JC Kerkrade | Leeuwarden |
| 21:00 | Robert Mühren 11'; Giovanni Korte 34'; Jarchinio Antonia 46' | Report | | Stadium: Cambuur Stadion |

| 7 November 2020 11th week | SC Cambuur | 2–3 | Jong Ajax | Leeuwarden |
| 16:30 | Mees Hoedemakers 15'; Michael Breij 22' | Report | Kenneth Taylor 8'; Devyne Rensch 82'; Enric Llansana 88' | Stadium: Cambuur Stadion; Referee: Christaan Bax |

| 15 November 2020 12th week | SC Cambuur | 7–2 | Almere City FC | Leeuwarden |
| 20:00 | Mitchell Paulissen 3'; Erik Schouten 24'; Jamie Jacobs 29'; Michael Breij 31'; Robert Mühren 48' 51'; Giovanni Korte 52' | Report | Delvechio Blackson 9'; Damon Mirani 90+1' | Stadium: Cambuur Stadion |

| 19 November 2020 13th week | De Graafschap | 0–2 | SC Cambuur | Doetinchem |
| 21:00 | | Report | Erik Schouten 42'; Giovanni Korte 65' | Stadium: De Vijverberg |

| 27 November 2020 14th week | SC Cambuur | 3–1 | FC Den Bosch | Leeuwarden |
| 18:45 | Giovanni Korte 40'; Robert Mühren 65'; Issa Kallon 76' | Report | Kevin Felida 20' | Stadium: Cambuur Stadion |

| 30 November 2020 10th week | Jong PSV | 0–1 | SC Cambuur | Eindhoven |
| 16:30 | | Report | Issa Kallon 71' | Stadium: De Herdgang |

| 4 December 2020 15th week | SC Telstar | 1–2 | SC Cambuur | Velsen |
| 18:45 | Gyliano van Velzen 54' | Report | Jamie Jacobs 60'; Robert Mühren 79' | Stadium: Rabobank IJmond Stadion |

| 12 December 2020 16th week | SC Cambuur | 2–0 | Jong AZ | Leeuwarden |
| 16:30 | Robert Mühren 62' 90+5' (pen.) | Report | | Stadium: Cambuur Stadion |

| 20 December 2020 17th week | Excelsior Rotterdam | 0–1 | SC Cambuur | Rotterdam |
| 12:15 | | Report | Robert Mühren 13' | Stadium: Van Donge & De Roo Stadion |

==== 2nd half ====
| 3 January 2021 18th week | FC Eindhoven | 2–5 | SC Cambuur | Eindhoven |
| 14:30 | Joey Sleegers 29'; Pieter Bogaers 64' | Report | Robert Mühren 4' 16' 41' (pen.); Issa Kallon 22'; Calvin Mac-Intosch 33' | Stadium: Jan Louwers Stadion |

| 8 January 2021 19th week | SC Cambuur | 0–1 | FC Volendam | Leeuwarden |
| 21:00 | | Report | Samuele Mulattieri 87' | Stadium: Cambuur Stadion |

| 17 January 2021 20th week | NEC Nijmegen | 0–0 | SC Cambuur | Nijmegen |
| 12:15 | | Report | | Stadium: Goffertstadion |

| 22 January 2021 21st week | SC Cambuur | 5–1 | Jong PSV | Leeuwarden |
| 18:45 | Jamie Jacobs 21' 58'; Robert Mühren 40' 44'; Jarchinio Antonia 72' | Report | Jeremy Antonisse 5' | Stadium: Cambuur Stadion |

| 31 January 2021 22nd week | SC Cambuur | 2–0 | MVV Maastricht | Leeuwarden |
| 20:00 | Robert Mühren 48'; Mees Hoedemakers 65' | Report | | Stadium: Cambuur Stadion |

| 16 February 2021 24th week | SC Cambuur | 3–0 | TOP Oss | Leeuwarden |
| 18:45 | Robert Mühren 26' 90+3'; Giovanni Korte 78' | Report | | Stadium: Cambuur Stadion |

| 19 February 2021 23rd week | Jong Ajax | 1–1 | SC Cambuur | Amsterdam |
| 16:30 | Naci Ünüvar 21' | Report | Robert Mühren 49' | Stadium: Sportpark De Toekomst |

| 22 February 2021 25th week | Jong FC Utrecht | 1–3 | SC Cambuur | Utrecht |
| 21:00 | Tim Pieters 90' | Report | Robert Mühren 44'; Raymond Huizing 61' (o.g.); Issa Kallon 90+1' | Stadium: Sportcomplex Zoudenbalch |

| 28 February 2021 26th week | Almere City FC | 0–2 | SC Cambuur | Almere |
| 12:15 | | Report | Jarchinio Antonia 25'; Ragnar Oratmangoen 87' | Stadium: Yanmar Stadion |

| 5 March 2021 27th week | SC Cambuur | 3–1 | SC Telstar | Leeuwarden |
| 21:00 | Robin Maulun 11'; Robert Mühren 19'; Jarchinio Antonia 56' | Report | Rashaan Fernandes 44' | Stadium: Cambuur Stadion |

| 12 March 2021 28th week | Go Ahead Eagles | 0–0 | SC Cambuur | Deventer |
| 21:00 | | Report | | Stadium: De Adelaarshorst |

| 22 March 2021 29th week | SC Cambuur | 3–0 | FC Eindhoven | Leeuwarden |
| 20:00 | Erik Schouten 58'; David Sambissa 84'; Ragnar Oratmangoen 89' | Report | | Stadium: Cambuur Stadion |

| 28 March 2021 30th week | Roda JC Kerkrade | 3–1 | SC Cambuur | Kerkrade |
| 16:45 | Erik Falkenburg 32'; Patrick Pflücke 80'; Kees Luijckx 88' | Report | Robert Mühren 85' | Stadium: Parkstad Limburg Stadion |

| 2 April 2021 31st week | FC Volendam | 0–3 | SC Cambuur | Volendam |
| 20:00 | | Report | Robert Mühren 18'; Michael Breij 27' 80' | Stadium: Kras Stadion |

| 5 April 2021 32th week | SC Cambuur | 7–2 | Excelsior Rotterdam | Leeuwarden |
| 14:30 | Jarchinio Antonia 14'; Robert Mühren 63' 76' (pen.) 87' (pen.); Ragnar Oratmangoen 71' 84' 90' | Report | Joël Zwarts 6'; Elías Már Ómarsson 52' | Stadium: Cambuur Stadion |

| 9 April 2021 33rd week | FC Den Bosch | 3–5 | SC Cambuur | 's-Hertogenbosch |
| 20:00 | Romano Postema 36'; Dhoraso Klas 45'; Jizz Hornkamp 74' | Report | Ragnar Oratmangoen 4' 90+2'; Robert Mühren 23' (pen.); Michael Breij 46'; Nick Doodeman 77' | Stadium: De Vliert |

| 16 April 2021 34th week | SC Cambuur | 4–1 | Helmond Sport | Leeuwarden |
| 20:00 | Robert Mühren 29' 51' (pen.); Issa Kallon 45'; Alec Van Hoorenbeeck 70' (o.g.) | Report | Jelle Goselink 25' | Stadium: Cambuur Stadion |

| 23 April 2021 35th week | Jong AZ | 2–4 | SC Cambuur | Alkmaar |
| 21:00 | Yusuf Barasi 54' 57' | Report | Peer Koopmeiners 12' (o.g.); Robert Mühren 17'; Issa Kallon 21'; Erik Schouten 41' | Stadium: AFAS Stadion |

| 30 April 2021 36th week | SC Cambuur | 1–1 | De Graafschap | Leeuwarden |
| 20:00 | Giovanni Korte 60' | Report | Michael Breij 31' (o.g.) | Stadium: Cambuur Stadion; Attendance: 2,400 |

| 7 May 2021 37th week | FC Dordrecht | 0–1 | SC Cambuur | Dordrecht |
| 20:00 | | Report | Robert Mühren 21' (pen.) | Stadium: GN Bouw Stadion |

| 12 May 2021 38th week | SC Cambuur | 3–2 | NAC Breda | Leeuwarden |
| 20:00 | Mitchell Paulissen 68'; Robert Mühren 83' 85' | Report | Sydney van Hooijdonk 36'; Kaj de Rooij 50' | Stadium: Cambuur Stadion |

=== KNVB Cup ===
| 28 October 2020 1st round | RKC Waalwijk | 2–2 (a.e.t.) (3–5 p) | SC Cambuur | Waalwijk |
| 19:45 | Lennerd Daneels 85'; Jurien Gaari 90+4' | Report | Maarten Pouwels 31'; Jamie Jacobs 40' | Stadium: Mandemakers Stadion; Attendance: 0 Referee: Martens |
| | Penalties |
| | Anas Tahiri (penalty scored); Melle Meulensteen (penalty missed); Vitalie Damașcan (penalty scored); Ayman Azhil (penalty scored) | | Mees Gootjes (penalty scored); Mees Hoedemakers (penalty scored); Mitchel Paulissen (penalty scored); Sven Nieuwpoort (penalty scored); Robin Maulun (penalty scored) |

| 17 December 2020 2nd round | SC Cambuur | 1–2 | Go Ahead Eagles | Leeuwarden |
| 18:45 | Ragnar Oratmangoen 29' | Report | Luuk Brouwers 32'; Bradly van Hoeven 63' | Stadium: Cambuur Stadion; Attendance: 0 Referee: Ingmar Oostrom |

== Statistics ==
=== Scorers ===
| # | Player | Eerste Divisie | KNVB | Total |
|---|---|---|---|---|
| 1 | (Netherlands) Robert Mühren | 38 | 0 | 38 |
| 2 | (Sierra Leone) Issa Kallon | 11 | 0 | 11 |
| 3 | (Netherlands) Giovanni Korte | 10 | 0 | 10 |
| 4 | (Netherlands) Jamie Jacobs | 8 | 1 | 9 |
| 4 | (Indonesia) Ragnar Oratmangoen | 8 | 1 | 9 |
| 6 | (Curaçao) Jarchinio Antonia | 7 | 0 | 7 |
| 6 | (Netherlands) Michael Breij | 7 | 0 | 7 |
| 8 | (Netherlands) Erik Schouten | 4 | 0 | 4 |
| 8 | (Netherlands) Mitchell Paulissen | 4 | 0 | 4 |
| 10 | (Netherlands) Mees Hoedemakers | 3 | 0 | 3 |
| 11 | (France) Robin Maulun | 2 | 0 | 2 |
| 12 | (Suriname) Calvin Mac-Intosch | 1 | 0 | 1 |
| 12 | (Gabon) David Sambissa | 1 | 0 | 1 |
| 12 | (Netherlands) Maarten Pouwels | 0 | 1 | 1 |
| 12 | (Netherlands) Nick Doodeman | 1 | 0 | 1 |
| 12 | (Netherlands) Sven Nieuwpoort | 1 | 0 | 1 |

=== Appearances ===
| # | Player | Eerste Divisie | KNVB | Total |
|---|---|---|---|---|
| 1 | (Netherlands) Mees Hoedemakers | 37 | 2 | 39 |
| 1 | (Netherlands) Sonny Stevens | 37 | 2 | 39 |
| 3 | (Netherlands) Doke Schmidt | 37 | 1 | 38 |
| 4 | (Suriname) Calvin Mac-Intosch | 37 | 0 | 37 |
| 4 | (Netherlands) Robert Mühren | 37 | 0 | 37 |
| 6 | (Netherlands) Giovanni Korte | 34 | 1 | 35 |
| 7 | (Curaçao) Jarchinio Antonia | 32 | 2 | 34 |
| 8 | (Sierra Leone) Issa Kallon | 31 | 1 | 32 |
| 9 | (Netherlands) Erik Schouten | 31 | 0 | 31 |
| 10 | (Netherlands) Michael Breij | 29 | 1 | 30 |
| 11 | (Gabon) David Sambissa | 27 | 2 | 29 |
| 11 | (Netherlands) Jamie Jacobs | 27 | 2 | 29 |
| 13 | (France) Robin Maulun | 26 | 2 | 28 |
| 14 | (Sierra Leone) Alex Bangura | 24 | 2 | 26 |
| 14 | (Netherlands) Jasper ter Heide | 24 | 2 | 26 |
| 16 | (Netherlands) Joris Kramer | 23 | 2 | 25 |
| 16 | (Netherlands) Mitchell Paulissen | 23 | 2 | 25 |
| 18 | (Indonesia) Ragnar Oratmangoen | 22 | 1 | 23 |
| 19 | (Netherlands) Nick Doodeman | 13 | 0 | 13 |
| 19 | (Netherlands) Sven Nieuwpoort | 11 | 2 | 13 |
| 21 | (Netherlands) Maarten Pouwels | 9 | 2 | 11 |
| 22 | (Netherlands) Delano Ladan | 9 | 1 | 10 |
| 23 | (Netherlands) Dylan Smit | 0 | 1 | 1 |
| 23 | (Haiti) Jhondly van der Meer | 1 | 0 | 1 |
| 23 | (Netherlands) Kellian van der Kaap | 1 | 0 | 1 |
| 23 | (Netherlands) Mees Gootjes | 0 | 1 | 1 |
| 23 | (Netherlands) Pieter Bos | 1 | 0 | 1 |
| 23 | (Netherlands) Stefan Deuling | 0 | 1 | 1 |

=== Clean sheets ===
| # | Player | Eerste Divisie |
|---|---|---|
| 1 | (Netherlands) Sonny Stevens | 14 |
| 2 | (Netherlands) Pieter Bos | 1 |

=== Disciplinary record ===
| # | Player | Eerste Divisie | | KNVB | | Total | |
| # | Player | Yellow card | Red card | Yellow card | Red card | Yellow card | Red card |
|---|---|---|---|---|---|---|---|
| 1 | (Netherlands) Mitchell Paulissen | 2 | 1 | 2 | 0 | 4 | 1 |
| 2 | (Netherlands) Doke Schmidt | 9 | 0 | 0 | 0 | 9 | 0 |
| 3 | (Netherlands) Mees Hoedemakers | 7 | 0 | 0 | 0 | 7 | 0 |
| 4 | (Sierra Leone) Issa Kallon | 5 | 0 | 0 | 0 | 5 | 0 |
| 5 | (Suriname) Calvin Mac-Intosch | 4 | 0 | 0 | 0 | 4 | 0 |
| 5 | (Indonesia) Ragnar Oratmangoen | 4 | 0 | 0 | 0 | 4 | 0 |
| 7 | (Sierra Leone) Alex Bangura | 1 | 0 | 2 | 0 | 3 | 0 |
| 7 | (Gabon) David Sambissa | 3 | 0 | 0 | 0 | 3 | 0 |
| 7 | (Netherlands) Joris Kramer | 3 | 0 | 0 | 0 | 3 | 0 |
| 10 | (Netherlands) Erik Schouten | 2 | 0 | 0 | 0 | 2 | 0 |
| 10 | (Netherlands) Jamie Jacobs | 2 | 0 | 0 | 0 | 2 | 0 |
| 10 | (Curaçao) Jarchinio Antonia | 2 | 0 | 0 | 0 | 2 | 0 |
| 10 | (Netherlands) Michael Breij | 2 | 0 | 0 | 0 | 2 | 0 |
| 10 | (France) Robin Maulun | 2 | 0 | 0 | 0 | 2 | 0 |
| 15 | (Netherlands) Robert Mühren | 1 | 0 | 0 | 0 | 1 | 0 |
| 15 | (Netherlands) Stefan Deuling | 1 | 0 | 0 | 0 | 1 | 0 |
