= Sandor van der Heide =

Dutch football manager and former player (born 1978)

Personal information
- Date of birth: 30 March 1978 (age 48)
- Place of birth: Ysbrechtum, Netherlands
- Height: 1.85 m (6 ft 1 in)
- Position: Midfielder

Youth career
- 1982–1988: LSC 1890
- 1988–1990: Sneek Wit Zwart
- 1990–1994: Heerenveen
- 1994–1997: Cambuur

Senior career*
Years	Team	Apps	(Gls)
1997–2001	Cambuur	88	(24)
2001–2002	Waldhof Mannheim	0	(0)
2001–2002	→ Cambuur (loan)	24	(7)
2002–2007	ONS Sneek		(56)
2007–2012	Cambuur	131	(35)
2012–2014	ONS Sneek	40	(22)
Total		283	(144)

Managerial career
- 2012–2014: ONS Sneek (player-assistant)
- 2014–2015: Cambuur (assistant)
- 2015–2017: IJsselmeervogels
- 2017–2019: De Graafschap (assistant)
- 2019–2021: Cambuur (assistant)
- * Club domestic league appearances and goals

Sandor van der Heide (born 30 March 1978) is a Dutch football manager and former player.

== Playing career ==
Born in Ysbrechtum, Friesland, Van der Heide joined Cambuur, signing a professional contract in 1997.

He made his Cambuur debut in a 4–1 Eerste Divisie win over Telstar on 23 August 1997, coming on as a substitute for René van Rijswijk.

== Coaching career ==
In March 2012, it was announced that Van der Heide would retire from professional football and join ONS Sneek as a playing assistant manager.

In May 2014, van der Heide returned to Cambuur as assistant manager to Henk de Jong, while also remaining active as an advisor at ONS Sneek. On 10 November 2015, he stepped down as assistant manager at Cambuur and continued in a scouting and analysis role for the club. A few days later, he left the club entirely and was appointed manager of IJsselmeervogels.

On 23 January 2017, Van der Heide also accepted a part-time role as assistant manager to Henk de Jong at De Graafschap, as he was still managing IJsselmeervogels at the time. However, on 17 August 2017, he decided to leave IJsselmeervogels with immediate effect, citing the difficulty of combining both roles. He was subsequently appointed full-time assistant manager at De Graafschap.

Ahead of the 2019–20 season, Van der Heide once again returned to Cambuur as assistant manager to Henk de Jong. In the autumn of 2020, and again during the spring of 2021, he suffered from burn-out symptoms, which led to prolonged periods of absence during the 2020–21 season—a campaign in which Cambuur won the Eerste Divisie and secured promotion to the Eredivisie.

== Personal life ==
After stepping back from day-to-day football coaching after leaving Cambuur in 2021, Van der Heide became active as an entrepreneur. Outside football, he owns several escape rooms as well as a beach club.

He is married to Tineke and the couple has three children.

== Honours ==
Cambuur

- Eerste Divisie: 2020–21
