= David Sambissa =

Footballer (born 1996)

Personal information
- Date of birth: 11 January 1996 (age 30)
- Place of birth: Saint-Maur-des-Fossés, France
- Height: 1.77 m (5 ft 10 in)
- Positions: Left-back; winger

Team information
- Current team: Al-Salmiya

Youth career
- Bonneuil-sur-Marne
- –2012: Bordeaux

Senior career*
Years	Team	Apps	(Gls)
2012–2016	Bordeaux B	53	(2)
2016–2017	US Lège Cap Ferret	14	(0)
2017–2018	Jong Twente	27	(2)
2018–2023	Cambuur	127	(5)
2023–2026	İstanbulspor	93	(7)
2026–	Al-Salmiya		

International career^{‡}
2012	France U16	6	(0)
2013	France U17	2	(0)
2014	France U18	1	(0)
2021	Congo	1	(0)
2021–	Gabon	22	(0)
- * Club domestic league appearances and goals as of 6 May 2026 ‡ National team caps and goals as of 30 March 2026 (UTC)

David Sambissa (born 11 January 1996) is a professional footballer who plays as a left-back or winger for Kuwaiti club Al-Salmiya. Born in France, he played for the Republic of the Congo national team before switching to the Gabon national team.

== Club career ==
He started his career with Bordeaux, but played predominantly for their reserve squad in the fourth tier, with occasional appearances on the bench for the senior squad.

After spending the 2016–17 season in the fifth tier with US Lège Cap Ferret, he moved to the Netherlands, signing with Twente. He didn't play for the main squad there either.

On 23 April 2018, he signed a one-year contract (with one-year extension option) with another Dutch club, Cambuur.

He made his Eerste Divisie debut for Cambuur on 17 August 2018 in a game against N.E.C., as a starter.

On 12 July 2023, he signed with Süper Lig clug İstanbulspor.

== International career ==
Born in France, Sambissa is of Gabonese and Republic of the Congo descent. He was a youth international for France. He represented the senior Republic of the Congo national team in a friendly 1–0 win over Niger on 10 June 2021.

In October 2021, he switched allegiances to join the Gabonese national team for the 2022 FIFA World Cup qualification games against Angola on 8 and 11 October 2021. He debuted with Gabon in a 2–0 2022 FIFA World Cup qualification win over Angola on 11 October 2021.

== Career statistics ==
=== Club ===
As of match played 19 April 2026

Appearances and goals by club, season and competition
Club	Season	League			Cup		Europe		Other		Total	
Club	Season	Division	Apps	Goals	Apps	Goals	Apps	Goals	Apps	Goals	Apps	Goals
Bordeaux B	2012–13	CFA	3	0	—		—		—		3	0
Bordeaux B	2013–14	CFA	7	1	—		—		—		7	1
Bordeaux B	2014–15	CFA	19	0	—		—		—		19	0
Bordeaux B	2015–16	CFA	24	1	—		—		—		24	1
Bordeaux B	Total		53	2	—		—		—		53	2
US Lège Cap Ferret	2016–17	National 3	14	0	—		—		—		14	0
Jong Twente	2017–18	Derde Divisie	27	2	—		—		—		27	2
Cambuur	2018–19	Eerste Divisie	32	0	2	0	—		4 (Note: Appearances in promotion play-offs)	0	38	0
Cambuur	2019–20	Eerste Divisie	28	0	1	0	—		—		29	0
Cambuur	2020–21	Eerste Divisie	27	1	2	0	—		—		29	1
Cambuur	2021–22	Eredivisie	22	3	1	0	—		—		23	3
Cambuur	2022–23	Eredivisie	18	1	2	0	—		—		20	1
Cambuur	Total		127	5	8	0	—		—		135	5
İstanbulspor	2023–24	Süper Lig	25	1	1	0	—		—		26	1
İstanbulspor	2024–25	TFF 1. Lig	35	3	4	2	—		1	0	40	5
İstanbulspor	2025–26	TFF 1. Lig	33	3	4	0	—		—		37	3
İstanbulspor	Total		93	7	9	2	—		1	0	103	9
Career total			314	16	17	2	0	0	5	0	336	18

=== International ===
As of match played 30 March 2026

Appearances and goals by national team and year
National team	Year	Apps	Goals
Gabon	2021	2	0
Gabon	2022	4	0
Gabon	2023	3	0
Gabon	2024	9	0
Gabon	2025	2	0
Gabon	2026	2	0
Total		22	0

== Honours ==
Cambuur

- Eerste Divisie: 2020–21

== See also ==
- List of association footballers who have been capped for two senior national teams
