= Giovanni de la Vega =

Dutch footballer (born 2000)

Personal information
- Date of birth: 22 February 2000 (age 26)
- Place of birth: Amsterdam, Netherlands
- Height: 1.70 m (5 ft 7 in)
- Position: Midfielder

Team information
- Current team: Scherpenzeel
- Number: 8

Youth career
- –2013: SV Rap
- 2013–2018: Ajax
- 2018–2021: Utrecht

Senior career*
Years	Team	Apps	(Gls)
2019–2021	Jong Utrecht	19	(1)
2022	OFC	8	(0)
2022–2024	Llosetense	39	(9)
2024–2025	GVVV	18	(0)
2025–	Scherpenzeel	12	(0)

International career^{‡}
2016	Chile U17	2	(0)
2017	Netherlands U17	2	(1)
- * Club domestic league appearances and goals as of 16 November 2025 ‡ National team caps and goals as of 22 July 2022

Giovanni de la Vega (born 22 February 2000) is a Dutch-Chilean footballer who plays as a midfielder for Scherpenzeel.

== Club career ==
After being released from Jong Utrecht, in 2022 he joined OFC Oostzaan in the Derde Divisie.

In July 2022, he moved to Spain and joined Tercera División RFEF club Llosetense.

In the second half of 2024, de la Vega returned to Netherlands and joined GVVV. The next season, he switched to VV Scherpenzeel in the Derde Divisie.

== International career ==
In 2016, he represented Chile at under-17 level in a friendly tournament called Copa UC in Santiago, Chile, playing two matches.

== Career statistics ==
=== Club ===
As of 1 June 2020.

Club	Season	League			Cup		Continental		Other		Total	
Club	Season	Division	Apps	Goals	Apps	Goals	Apps	Goals	Apps	Goals	Apps	Goals
Jong Utrecht	2018–19	Eerste Divisie	2	0	–		–		0	0	2	0
Jong Utrecht	2019–20	Eerste Divisie	13	1	–		–		0	0	13	1
Career total			15	1	0	0	0	0	0	0	15	1

== Personal life ==
His father, Marco, is a Chilean political exiled in Netherlands due to the military dictatorship of Chile (1973–1990) and his mother, Josey, is a Dutchwoman. He has two sisters, Melissa and Tamara. Due to his Chilean heritage, he holds both Dutch and Chilean nationality.

On 25 October 2020 he took part by first time in a Chilean referendum, voting in the national plebiscite for a new Constitution along with both his father and his sister, Melissa, in the Casa Migrante Amsterdam.
