= Stanley Akoy =

Dutch footballer (born 1996)

Personal information
- Full name: Stanley Josafath Akoy
- Date of birth: 17 November 1996 (age 29)
- Place of birth: Purmerend, Netherlands
- Height: 1.71 m (5 ft 7 in)
- Position: Midfielder

Youth career
- –2018: Ajax

Senior career*
Years	Team	Apps	(Gls)
2018–2019	Jong Cambuur		
2019–2021	Cambuur	19	(1)
2022	Telstar	9	(0)
2022–2023	Olympias Lympion		
2024	Fleetwood United		
2024–2025	Dubai City		
2025–2026	Gulf United		
- * Club domestic league appearances and goals as of 14:49, 1 July 2022 (UTC)

Stanley Akoy (born 17 November 1996) is a Dutch professional footballer who plays as a midfielder.

== Career ==
Born in Purmerend, Akoy made his debut for SC Cambuur on 8 August 2019, coming on as a second-half substitute in a 2–0 defeat away at De Graafschap.

In January 2022, he signed for Eerste Divisie club SC Telstar.

Akoy joined Cypriot Second Division club Olympias Lympion on 31 August 2022.

== Personal life ==
Born in the Netherlands, Akoy is of Surinamese descent.

== Career statistics ==
Appearances and goals by club, season and competition
Club	Season	League			KNVB Cup		Other		Total	
Club	Season	Division	Apps	Goals	Apps	Goals	Apps	Goals	Apps	Goals
SC Cambuur	2019–20	Eerste Divisie	19	1	2	1	0	0	21	2
Career total			19	1	2	1	0	0	21	2
