= Calvin Mac-Intosch =

Surinamese footballer (born 1989)

Personal information
- Full name: Calvin Leonard Mac-Intosch
- Date of birth: 9 August 1989 (age 37)
- Place of birth: Amsterdam, Netherlands
- Height: 1.81 m (5 ft 11 in)
- Position: Centre-back

Youth career
- 1997–2009: Ajax

Senior career*
Years	Team	Apps	(Gls)
2009–2010	Haarlem	22	(1)
2010–2014	Telstar	89	(5)
2014–2016	Cambuur	34	(2)
2016–2017	Port Vale	3	(0)
2017–2018	Almere City	50	(5)
2018–2019	Notodden	12	(0)
2019	Fortuna Sittard	12	(0)
2019–2023	Cambuur	108	(3)
2023–2025	TOP Oss	24	(0)
2025–2026	Ajax Amateurs		
Total		354	(16)

International career
2022	Suriname	2	(0)
- * Club domestic league appearances and goals

Calvin Leonard Mac-Intosch (born 9 August 1989) is a former footballer who played as a centre-back. Born in the Netherlands, he won two caps for the Suriname national team.

A former youth team player at Ajax, he turned professional at HFC Haarlem in 2009. Following Haarlem's bankruptcy in January 2010, he moved to SC Telstar. He spent four full seasons at Telstar and made 91 league and cup appearances before he moved up to the Eredivisie to play for SC Cambuur in May 2014. He signed with English club Port Vale in July 2016. He returned to the Netherlands to play for Almere City in January 2017. He joined the Norwegian side Notodden in 2018 before returning to the Netherlands to sign for Fortuna Sittard in February 2019. He rejoined former club Cambuur in May 2019 and helped them to win the Eerste Divisie title in the 2020–21 season. He signed with TOP Oss in June 2023, where he remained for two years.

== Career ==
=== Haarlem ===
Mac-Intosch spent 12 years at the Academy at Ajax and carried the club logo on the pitch during the 1998 UEFA Champions League final at the Amsterdam Arena. However, he struggled with injuries and never featured in a first-team game. He joined Haarlem in June 2009, having been released by Ajax. He made his first-team debut for Haarlem against SC Veendam at Haarlem Stadion on 7 August 2009. He scored his first goal for the club 17 days later against AGOVV Apeldoorn. On 30 October, he was sent off against FC Eindhoven. On 13 December, he received the second red card of his career against FC Volendam at the Kras Stadion. He made a total of 22 Eerste Divisie (second tier) appearances for Haarlem before the club were made bankrupt and dissolved midway through the 2009–10 season. He quickly found a new club, ending the season with Telstar. He featured 13 times for Telstar, and received the third red card of his season in a 1–0 defeat to PEC Zwolle at the IJsseldelta Stadion on 12 February. Telstar ended the season in 18th place, finishing ahead of relegated FC Oss on goal difference.

=== Telstar ===
He played nine games in the 2009–10 season as Telstar rose to 14th place and scored his first goal for the club in a 1–1 draw with Go Ahead Eagles on 29 April. However, he played just once in the 2011–12 campaign. He went on to secure a first-team place in the 2012–13 season and played 31 games as the "White Lions" posted a 14th-place finish in the league. He scored four goals in 37 appearances in the 2013–14 campaign, helping Telstar to a 15th-place finish.

=== Cambuur ===
He signed a one-year contract with Eredivisie (first tier) club Cambuur in May 2014. He made 23 appearances throughout the 2014–15 campaign as the "Yellow-Blues" posted a 12th-place finish. He signed a new one-year contract in March 2015. He missed four months of the 2015–16 season with a knee injury picked up in early November, and underwent surgery to correct the problem. He played 15 games throughout the season, and scored twice; once in a 2–2 draw with De Graafschap and the other in a 6–2 defeat at PSV Eindhoven. Cambuur were relegated in last place, and Mac-Intosch was released at the end of the season.

=== Port Vale ===
In July 2016, Mac-Intosch signed a two-year contract with English League One club Port Vale. He started two of the club's opening three games of the 2016–17 season but then went seven weeks without a game, and after being booked whilst the "Valiants" conceded two early goals he was substituted just 28 minutes into a 2–2 draw with Oxford United at Vale Park on 22 October. He started just three league games despite being named in the matchday squad 22 times as the form of Nathan Smith and Remie Streete left him with limited first-team opportunities, and he left the club by mutual consent in January 2017 shortly after Michael Brown succeeded Bruno Ribeiro as manager.

=== Almere City ===
Mac-Intosch returned to the Eerste Divisie following his spell in England and signed a one-and-a-half-year contract with Jack de Gier's Almere City in January 2017. He scored three goals in 13 games to help the "Sheepheads" qualify for the play-offs at the end of the 2016–17 season. However, they exited the play-offs at the first round following a 6–2 aggregate defeat to Helmond Sport. City's aim for the 2017–18 season was to reach the play-offs again. They succeeded in their aim but manager still stated he was not satisfied with the defence and de Gier did not extend his contract at the club.

=== Notodden ===
He joined Norwegian 1. divisjon side Notodden midway through the 2018 season.

=== Fortuna Sittard ===
On 20 February 2019, Mac-Intosch signed a contract with Eredivisie club Fortuna Sittard to run until the end of the 2018–19 season, following a successful trial spell; he joined the club after a wave of injuries to central defenders which left Wessel Dammers, Anthony Syhre, Kai Heerings and Branislav Niňaj unavailable.

=== Return to Cambuur ===
On 24 May 2019, Mac-Intosch signed a two-year contract, with an option for a further year, at former club Cambuur. Technical manager Foeke Booy said that he was a "stable and reliable" player. At the time the 2019–20 season was halted due to the COVID-19 pandemic in the Netherlands, Cambuur were top of the Eerste Divisie and Mac-Intosch was credited with leading the defensive line as they also boasted the best defensive record in the division. The Royal Dutch Football Association (KNVB) ruled that Cambuur would not be promoted, despite the club sitting 11 points ahead of the play-off places. Manager Henk de Jong called the decision "the greatest disgrace ever in Dutch sport". Mac-Intosch made 37 appearances in the 2020–21 season, helping Cambuur to win promotion as Eerste Divisie title winners. The club celebrated with a helicopter ride, though Mac-Intosch declined to go on the trip, stating that "I think [it is] too much. But I saw some videos of the guys and they seemed to enjoy it, so I enjoy as well then. To be honest, I thought it would be military helicopter, but it [looks] somewhat old-fashioned. You know; I am fine in an airplane but a helicopter... hmm, not for me." He played 34 games and 14 in the 2021–22 and 2022–23 campaigns during Cambuur's two season stay in the Eredivisie, which came to an end with relegation in 17th-place.

=== TOP Oss ===
On 13 June 2023, Mac-Intosh signed a two-year contract with Eerste Divisie club TOP Oss. He featured 17 times in the 2023–24 season. He featured seven times in the 2024–25 campaign.

== International career ==
Born in the Netherlands, Mac-Intosh is of Surinamese descent. He debuted with the Surinamese national team in a friendly 1–0 loss to Thailand on 27 March 2022. He played again in a 3–0 defeat to Mexico in a CONCACAF Nations League game on 11 June.

== Style of play ==
In December 2014, he was described as a "dark Jaap Stam" by FOX Sports analyst Jan van Halst. Mac-Intosch responded by saying "I wouldn't say that. I'm just Calvin Mac-Intosch", and stated that though he was a tough centre-back, he was not overly rough.

== Career statistics ==
Appearances and goals by club, season and competition
Club	Season	League			National cup (Note: Includes KNVB Cup, FA Cup, Norwegian Cup)		League cup (Note: Includes EFL Cup)		Other		Total	
Club	Season	Division	Apps	Goals	Apps	Goals	Apps	Goals	Apps	Goals	Apps	Goals
Haarlem	2009–10	Eerste Divisie	22	1	1	0	—		0	0	23	1
Telstar	2009–10	Eerste Divisie	13	0	0	0	—		0	0	13	0
Telstar	2010–11	Eerste Divisie	9	1	0	0	—		0	0	9	1
Telstar	2011–12	Eerste Divisie	1	0	0	0	—		0	0	1	0
Telstar	2012–13	Eerste Divisie	30	0	1	0	—		0	0	31	0
Telstar	2013–14	Eerste Divisie	36	4	1	0	—		0	0	37	4
Telstar	Total		89	5	2	0	0	0	0	0	91	5
Cambuur	2014–15	Eredivisie	20	0	3	1	—		0	0	23	1
Cambuur	2015–16	Eredivisie	14	2	1	0	—		0	0	15	2
Cambuur	Total		34	2	4	1	0	0	0	0	38	3
Port Vale	2016–17	EFL League One	3	0	0	0	1	0	2 (Note: Appearance(s) in the EFL Trophy.)	0	6	0
Almere City	2016–17	Eerste Divisie	13	3	0	0	—		1 (Note: Appearance(s) in the play-offs.)	0	14	3
Almere City	2017–18	Eerste Divisie	37	2	2	0	—		3	0	42	2
Almere City	Total		50	5	2	0	0	0	4	0	56	5
Notodden	2018	1. divisjon	12	0	0	0	—		0	0	12	0
Fortuna Sittard	2018–19	Eredivisie	12	0	0	0	—		0	0	12	0
Cambuur	2019–20	Eerste Divisie	28	2	2	1	—		0	0	30	3
Cambuur	2020–21	Eerste Divisie	37	1	0	0	—		—		37	1
Cambuur	2021–22	Eredivisie	32	0	2	0	—		—		34	0
Cambuur	2022–23	Eredivisie	11	0	2	0	—		—		13	0
Cambuur	Total		108	3	6	1	0	0	0	0	114	4
TOP Oss	2023–24	Eerste Divisie	17	0	0	0	—		—		17	0
TOP Oss	2024–25	Eerste Divisie	7	0	0	0	—		—		7	0
TOP Oss	Total		24	0	0	0	0	0	0	0	24	0
Career total			354	16	15	2	1	0	6	0	376	18

== Honours ==
Cambuur

- Eerste Divisie: 2020–21
