= Mitchel Paulissen =

Dutch footballer (born 1993)

- Paulissen with Lee Man in 2023

Personal information
- Date of birth: 21 April 1993 (age 33)
- Place of birth: Kerkrade, Netherlands
- Height: 1.83 m (6 ft 0 in)
- Position: Attacking midfielder

Team information
- Current team: Roda JC Kerkrade
- Number: 6

Youth career
- RKTSV
- 2001–2011: Roda JC Kerkrade

Senior career*
Years	Team	Apps	(Gls)
2011–2019	Roda JC Kerkrade	130	(18)
2016	→ VVV-Venlo (loan)	14	(2)
2019–2023	Cambuur	101	(10)
2023–2025	Lee Man	40	(7)
2025–	Roda JC Kerkrade	21	(3)
- * Club domestic league appearances and goals as of 25 April 2026

Mitchel Paulissen (born 21 April 1993) is a Dutch professional footballer who plays as an attacking midfielder for Eerste Divisie club Roda JC Kerkrade.

== Club career ==
Ahead of the 2019–20 season, Paulissen joined Cambuur on a free transfer, signing a two-year deal. The deal was confirmed on 30 May 2019. Following his contract expiry at Cambuur, it was reported that Mitchell had signed with Hong Kong Premier League club Lee Man on a free.

On 8 July 2023, Paulissen officially joined Lee Man.

On 26 May 2025, Paulissen signed a two-season contract to return to Roda JC Kerkrade.

== Career statistics ==
As of 31 August 2024

Appearances and goals by club, season and competition
Club	Season	League			National cup		Continental		Other		Total	
Club	Season	Division	Apps	Goals	Apps	Goals	Apps	Goals	Apps	Goals	Apps	Goals
Roda JC	2011–12	Eredivisie	1	0	0	0	—		—		1	0
Roda JC	2012–13	Eredivisie	2	0	0	0	—		1 (Note: Appearances in Eredivisie promotion/relegation play-offs)	0	3	0
Roda JC	2013–14	Eredivisie	15	1	3	0	—		—		18	1
Roda JC	2014–15	Eerste Divisie	30	6	4	1	—		4	2	39	9
Roda JC	2015–16	Eredivisie	15	0	1	0	—		—		16	0
Roda JC	2016–17	Eredivisie	31	4	1	0	—		1	0	33	4
Roda JC	2017–18	Eredivisie	7	1	1	0	—		0	0	8	1
Roda JC	2018–19	Eerste Divisie	28	6	3	1	—		—		31	7
Roda JC	Total		129	18	13	2	—		6	2	148	22
VVV-Venlo (loan)	2015–16	Eerste Divisie	14	2	—		—		1	0	15	2
Cambuur	2019–20	Eerste Divisie	18	1	2	0	—		—		20	1
Cambuur	2020–21	Eerste Divisie	23	4	2	0	—		—		25	4
Cambuur	2021–22	Eredivisie	31	3	1	0	—		—		32	3
Cambuur	2022–23	Eredivisie	29	2	2	0	—		—		31	2
Cambuur	Total		101	10	7	0	—		—		108	10
Lee Man	2023–24	Hong Kong Premier League	19	3	3	1	2	2	9 (Note: Five appearances and one goal in Hong Kong Sapling Cup, two appearances in Hong Kong Senior Challenge Shield, two appearances in HKPLC Cup)	1	33	7
Career total			263	33	23	3	2	2	16	3	304	41

== Honour ==
Lee Man

- Hong Kong Premier League: 2023–24
