= Ragnar Oratmangoen =

Professional footballer

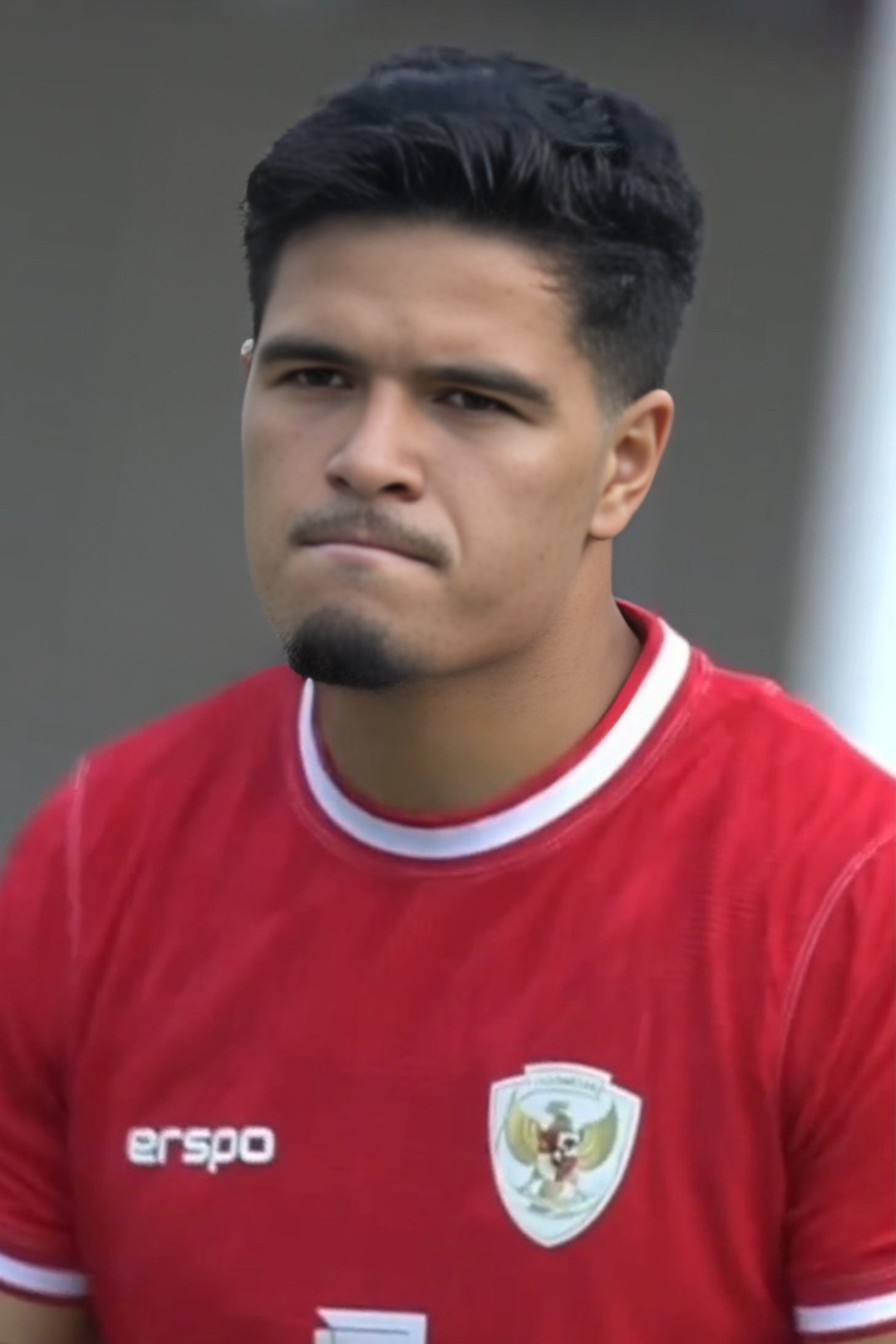
- Oratmangoen playing for Indonesia in 2024

Personal information
- Full name: Ragnar Anthonius Maria Oratmangoen
- Date of birth: 21 January 1998 (age 28)
- Place of birth: Oss, Netherlands
- Height: 1.80 m (5 ft 11 in)
- Positions: Winger; attacking midfielder

Team information
- Current team: Persib Bandung
- Number: 77

Youth career
- 2016–2017: NEC

Senior career*
Years	Team	Apps	(Gls)
2017–2019	NEC	0	(0)
2018–2019	→ TOP Oss (loan)	48	(5)
2019–2021	Cambuur	47	(12)
2021–2022	Go Ahead Eagles	33	(0)
2022–2024	Groningen	20	(0)
2023–2024	→ Fortuna Sittard (loan)	27	(0)
2024–2026	Dender	38	(2)
2026–	Persib Bandung	4	(0)

International career^{‡}
2024–	Indonesia	24	(5)
Medal record
Men's football
Representing Indonesia
FIFA ASEAN Cup
Winner	2026 Indonesia	Team
FIFA Series
Runner-up	2026 Indonesia
- * Club domestic league appearances and goals as of 1 November 2026 ‡ National team caps and goals as of 5 October 2026

Ragnar Anthonius Maria Oratmangoen (born 21 January 1998) is a professional footballer who plays as a winger or an attacking midfielder for Super League club Persib Bandung. Born in the Netherlands, he represents the Indonesia national team.

== Club career ==
=== NEC ===
Born in Oss, Oratmangoen turned professional with NEC in April 2016. In December 2017 he signed a six-month loan contract with TOP Oss, effective from January 2018.

=== Cambuur ===
After Oratmangoen had been demoted to the reserve team Jong NEC as a result of fierce competition in his position ahead of the 2019–20 season, he moved to SC Cambuur on a free transfer on 24 July 2019. There, he signed a two-year contract with an option for another season. He then signed with Go Ahead Eagles in May 2021, who had also won promotion to the Eredivisie.

=== Groningen ===
On 15 April 2022, Oratmangoen signed a three-year contract with a two-year option with Groningen, starting from the 2022–23 season.

==== Loan to Fortuna Sittard ====
On 1 September 2023, Oratmangoen moved on loan to Fortuna Sittard, with an option of buyout clause.

=== Dender ===
On 13 August 2024, Oratmangoen officially joined Belgian Pro League club FCV Dender on a two-year contract. Oratmangoen made his debut for the club on 22 September 2024, against Genk in a 0–4 defeat. On 26 October 2024, Oratmangoen scored his first league goal for Dender in a 2–5 home loss to Mechelen.

=== Persib Bandung ===
On 4 July 2026, Oratmangoen officially joined Persib Bandung with a three-season contract.

== International career ==
In November 2023, Oratmangoen confirmed that he had decided to represent Indonesia at international level. On 7 March 2024, Oratmangoen was called up to the Indonesia national team for the 2026 FIFA World Cup qualification matches against Vietnam. On 26 March 2024, Ragnar scored in his debut against Vietnam in a 3–0 win, earning the man-of-the-match for his performance.

== Personal life ==
Born in the Netherlands, Oratmangoen is a Muslim of Indonesian descent, with his grandparents being from Tanimbar Islands, Maluku. He converted to Islam when he was 15 years old.

He is the nephew of the Indonesian ambassador to China and Mongolia, Djauhari Oratmangun.

On 18 March 2024, Oratmangoen officially obtained Indonesian citizenship.

== Career statistics ==
=== Club ===
As of match played 1 November 2026

Appearances and goals by club, season and competition
Club	Season	League			National cup		Other		Total	
Club	Season	Division	Apps	Goals	Apps	Goals	Apps	Goals	Apps	Goals
NEC	2017–18	Eerste Divisie	0	0	0	0	—		0	0
TOP Oss (loan)	2017–18	Eerste Divisie	18	2	0	0	—		18	2
TOP Oss (loan)	2018–19	Eerste Divisie	30	3	1	0	—		31	3
TOP Oss (loan)	Total		48	5	1	0	0	0	49	5
Cambuur	2019–20	Eerste Divisie	25	4	2	0	—		27	4
Cambuur	2020–21	Eerste Divisie	22	8	1	0	—		23	8
Cambuur	Total		47	12	3	0	0	0	50	12
Go Ahead Eagles	2021–22	Eredivisie	33	0	5	0	—		38	0
Groningen	2022–23	Eredivisie	19	0	2	0	—		21	0
Groningen	2023–24	Eerste Divisie	1	0	0	0	—		1	0
Groningen	Total		20	0	2	0	0	0	22	0
Fortuna Sittard (loan)	2023–24	Eredivisie	27	0	4	0	—		31	0
Dender	2024–25	Belgian Pro League	20	1	1	0	—		21	1
Dender	2025–26	Belgian Pro League	18	1	1	0	—		19	1
Dender	Total		38	2	2	0	0	0	40	2
Persib Bandung	2026–27	Super League	4	0	0	0	2	0	6	0
Career total			217	19	17	0	2	0	236	19

=== International ===
As of match played 5 October 2026

Appearances and goals by national team and year
National team	Year	Apps	Goals
Indonesia	2024	10	2
Indonesia	2025	3	0
Indonesia	2026	11	3
Total		24	5

As of match played 5 October 2026
Scores and results list Indonesia's goal tally first, score column indicates score after each Oratmangoen goal.

List of international goals scored by Ragnar Oratmangoen
No.	Date	Venue	Cap	Opponent	Score	Result	Competition
1	26 March 2024	Mỹ Đình National Stadium, Hanoi, Vietnam	1	Vietnam	2–0	3–0	2026 FIFA World Cup qualification
2	10 October 2024	Bahrain National Stadium, Riffa, Bahrain	7	Bahrain	1–1	2–2	2026 FIFA World Cup qualification
3	5 June 2026	Gelora Bung Karno Stadium, Jakarta, Indonesia	16	Oman	3–0	3–0	Garuda Championship Series
4	7 August 2026	Jalan Besar Stadium, Kallang, Singapore	20	Singapore	1–0	1–1	2026 ASEAN Championship
5	25 September 2026	Gelora Bung Karno Stadium, Jakarta, Indonesia	21	Singapore	1–0	2–0	2026 FIFA ASEAN Cup

== Honours ==
Cambuur

- Eerste Divisie: 2020–21

Indonesia

- FIFA ASEAN Cup: 2026

== See also ==
- List of Indonesia international footballers born outside Indonesia
