= Delano Ladan =

Dutch footballer (born 2000)

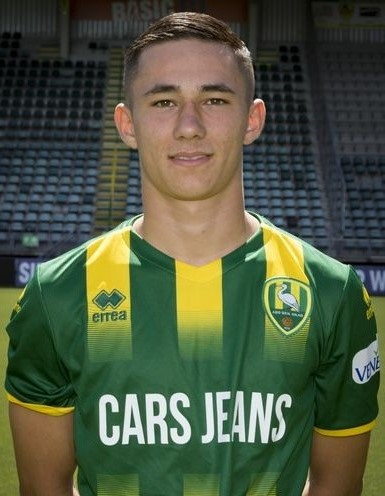
- Ladan with ADO Den Haag in 2017

Personal information
- Date of birth: 9 February 2000 (age 26)
- Place of birth: Leiderdorp, Netherlands
- Height: 1.78 m (5 ft 10 in)
- Position: Winger

Team information
- Current team: Koninklijke HFC
- Number: 87

Youth career
- 2006–2011: Feyenoord
- 2011–2012: DSO
- 2012–2013: Haaglandia
- 2013–2017: ADO Den Haag
- 2021–2022: Feyenoord U21

Senior career*
| Years | Team | Apps | (Gls) |
| 2017–2019 | ADO Den Haag | 4 | (0) |
| 2018–2019 | → TOP Oss (loan) | 27 | (1) |
| 2019–2021 | Cambuur | 23 | (1) |
| 2022–2024 | TOP Oss | 45 | (3) |
| 2025– | Koninklijke HFC | 55 | (13) |

International career^{‡}
| 2017 | Netherlands U17 | 6 | (0) |
| 2017–2018 | Netherlands U18 | 6 | (3) |
- * Club domestic league appearances and goals as of 11:18, 24 October 2026 (UTC) ‡ National team caps and goals as of 23 March 2018

Delano Ladan (born 9 February 2000) is a Dutch professional footballer who plays as a winger for Tweede Divisie club Koninklijke HFC.

== Club career ==
Ladan joined ADO Den Haag's youth academy in 2013 and became part of the first team in the summer of 2017. He made his professional debut on 11 August 2017, in a home match against Utrecht, which ended in a 3–0 loss. Ladan came on as a substitute for Donny Gorter in the 78th minute. He made four appearances for ADO in the 2017–18 season. The following season, he was sent on loan to Eerste Divisie club TOP Oss. Mainly a substitute during that season, he scored his first professional goal which secured TOP's 2–1 victory against Jong Utrecht on 5 October 2018.

In August 2019, his contract with ADO was terminated, and he moved to Cambuur. In the 2019–20 season, Ladan scored his first hat-trick, netting three goals in a 5–0 away win over GOES in the KNVB Cup first round.

In October 2021, Ladan was signed to Feyenoord's under-21 team, where he had previously played in the youth teams. On 8 January 2022, he made his unofficial debut for Feyenoord's first team in a friendly match against PEC Zwolle, scoring immediately.

On 24 June 2022, Ladan rejoined Eerste Divisie club TOP Oss; his second stint with the club after a successful loan in the 2018–19 season. After scoring three goals in 47 appearances for TOP, he left the club at the end of the 2023–24 season.

On 28 January 2025, Ladan signed a one-and-a-half-year contract with Tweede Divisie club Koninklijke HFC.

== Personal life ==
Born in the Netherlands, Ladan is of Indonesian descent.

== Career statistics ==
As of match played 16 May 2026

Appearances and goals by club, season and competition
| Club | Season | League | | | KNVB Cup | | Other | | Total | |
| Club | Season | Division | Apps | Goals | Apps | Goals | Apps | Goals | Apps | Goals |
|---|---|---|---|---|---|---|---|---|---|---|
| ADO Den Haag | 2017–18 | Eredivisie | 4 | 0 | 0 | 0 | — | | 4 | 0 |
| TOP Oss (loan) | 2018–19 | Eerste Divisie | 27 | 1 | 2 | 0 | 2 (Note: Appearances in Eredivisie promotion/relegation playoffs) | 0 | 31 | 1 |
| Cambuur | 2019–20 | Eerste Divisie | 14 | 1 | 2 | 3 | — | | 16 | 4 |
| Cambuur | 2020–21 | Eerste Divisie | 9 | 0 | 1 | 0 | — | | 10 | 0 |
| Cambuur | Total | | 23 | 1 | 3 | 3 | — | | 26 | 4 |
| TOP Oss | 2022–23 | Eerste Divisie | 15 | 0 | 1 | 0 | — | | 16 | 0 |
| TOP Oss | 2023–24 | Eerste Divisie | 30 | 3 | 1 | 0 | — | | 31 | 3 |
| TOP Oss | Total | | 45 | 3 | 2 | 0 | — | | 47 | 3 |
| Koninklijke HFC | 2024–25 | Tweede Divisie | 13 | 4 | 0 | 0 | — | | 13 | 4 |
| Koninklijke HFC | 2025–26 | Tweede Divisie | 32 | 6 | 2 | 0 | — | | 34 | 6 |
| Koninklijke HFC | Total | | 45 | 10 | 2 | 0 | — | | 47 | 10 |
| Career total | | | 144 | 15 | 9 | 3 | 2 | 0 | 155 | 18 |

== Honours ==
Cambuur

- Eerste Divisie: 2020–21
