= Doke Schmidt =

Dutch footballer (born 1992)

Personal information
- Date of birth: 7 April 1992 (age 34)
- Place of birth: Heerenveen, Netherlands
- Height: 1.78 m (5 ft 10 in)
- Position: Right-back

Youth career
- Heerenveense Boys
- Heerenveen

Senior career*
Years	Team	Apps	(Gls)
2011–2019	Heerenveen	80	(1)
2013–2014	→ Go Ahead Eagles (loan)	27	(2)
2019–2023	Cambuur	107	(0)
2023–2024	Helmond Sport	22	(0)

International career
2012	Netherlands U20	1	(0)
- * Club domestic league appearances and goals as of 16 June 2024

Doke Schmidt (born 7 April 1992) is a Dutch former professional footballer who plays as a right-back.

== Club career ==
On 8 August 2023, Schmidt signed a one-year contract with Helmond Sport. He left the club at the end of the season.
