= Sonny Stevens =

Dutch footballer (born 1992)

Personal information
- Full name: Sonny Ricardo Marciano
- Date of birth: 22 June 1992 (age 34)
- Place of birth: Hoorn, Netherlands
- Height: 1.94 m (6 ft 4 in)
- Position: Goalkeeper

Team information
- Current team: Dewa United
- Number: 92

Youth career
- Always Forward
- Volendam

Senior career*
Years	Team	Apps	(Gls)
2010–2013	Volendam	42	(0)
2013–2017	Twente	13	(0)
2013–2017	Jong Twente	21	(0)
2017–2018	Go Ahead Eagles	38	(0)
2018–2019	Excelsior	14	(0)
2019–2022	Cambuur	95	(0)
2022–2023	OFI	6	(0)
2023	→ ADO Den Haag (loan)	14	(0)
2023–	Dewa United	109	(1)

International career
2013	Netherlands U21	1	(0)
- * Club domestic league appearances and goals as of 31 October 2026

Sonny Ricardo Marciano (born 22 June 1992), commonly known as Sonny Stevens, is a Dutch professional footballer who plays as a goalkeeper for Super League club Dewa United.

== Career ==
Stevens left Cambuur on 30 June 2022 at the expiry of his contract, after failing to agree on extension.

On 10 August 2022, Stevens signed a two-year contract with OFI in Greece.

On 1 July 2023, Stevens signed with Indonesia club, Dewa United. On 23 February 2024, Stevens scored his first goal in his career against PSIS Semarang for a late equalizer in a 1–1 draw. Making him the first goalkeeper to scored a goal in the Liga 1 era and the second of all time in the Indonesia top league.

== Honours ==
Cambuur

- Eerste Divisie: 2020–21

Individual

- Eredivisie Team of the Month: January 2022
- APPI Indonesian Football Award Best Goalkepper: 2024–25
- APPI Indonesian Football Award Best 11: 2024–25
