= Giovanni Korte =

Dutch footballer (born 1993)

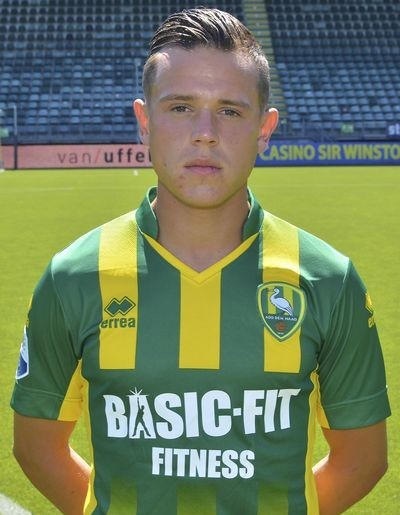

Personal information
- Date of birth: 1 August 1993 (age 33)
- Place of birth: The Hague, Netherlands
- Height: 1.70 m (5 ft 7 in)
- Position: Winger

Team information
- Current team: VV Katwijk
- Number: 7

Senior career*
Years	Team	Apps	(Gls)
2013–2016	ADO Den Haag	18	(0)
2013–2015	→ Dordrecht (loan)	50	(18)
2016–2019	NAC Breda	88	(12)
2019–2021	Cambuur	44	(11)
2021–2023	De Graafschap	63	(8)
2023–2025	TOP Oss	52	(7)
2025–	VV Katwijk	40	(16)
- * Club domestic league appearances and goals as of 18:23, 19 October 2026 (UTC)

Giovanni Korte (born 1 August 1993) is a Dutch professional footballer who plays as a winger for Tweede Divisie club VV Katwijk.

== Career ==
Korte began his career with ADO Den Haag and made his professional debut on 12 May 2013 in a 4–2 defeat against PEC Zwolle. He was sent on loan at FC Dordrecht for the 2013–14 season. After his contract with ADO had not been extended, Korte signed a three-year deal with NAC Breda in June 2016. In 2019, he signed with SC Cambuur.

On 29 June 2021, he signed a two-year contract with De Graafschap.

On 21 August 2023, Korte signed for Eerste Divisie club TOP Oss.
