= Jarchinio Antonia =

Curaçaoan footballer (born 1990)

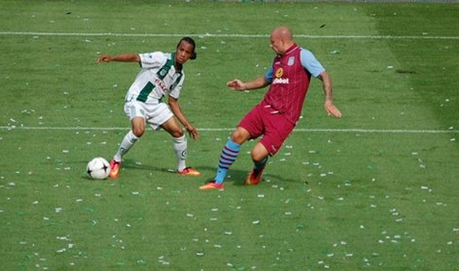
- Antonia (left) with FC Groningen in 2014

Personal information
- Full name: Jarchinio Angelo Roberto Antonia
- Date of birth: 27 December 1990 (age 35)
- Place of birth: Amsterdam, Netherlands
- Height: 1.69 m (5 ft 7 in)
- Position: Winger

Team information
- Current team: Ajax Amateurs

Youth career
- Zeeburgia
- Fortius
- Ajax
- ADO Den Haag

Senior career*
| Years | Team | Apps | (Gls) |
| 2010–2011 | ADO Den Haag | 3 | (0) |
| 2011 | → Go Ahead Eagles (loan) | 15 | (3) |
| 2011–2014 | Go Ahead Eagles | 96 | (22) |
| 2014–2016 | Groningen | 44 | (2) |
| 2016–2017 | Go Ahead Eagles | 29 | (5) |
| 2017–2019 | Omonia | 40 | (1) |
| 2019 | AEL Limassol | 13 | (1) |
| 2019–2021 | Cambuur | 49 | (8) |
| 2021–2023 | NAC Breda | 23 | (1) |
| 2023–2025 | TEC | 51 | (4) |
| 2025– | Ajax Amateurs | | |

International career
| 2008 | Netherlands U18 | 1 | (0) |
| 2016–2021 | Curaçao | 28 | (1) |
- * Club domestic league appearances and goals as of 3 May 2025

Jarchinio Angelo Roberto Antonia (born 27 December 1990) is a Curaçaoan professional footballer who plays as a winger for the Ajax Amateurs.

== Club career ==
Antonia formerly played for ADO Den Haag and moved to Go Ahead Eagles in summer 2011 after spending half a year on loan at Go Ahead from January that year. In summer 2014 he joined FC Groningen for a fee of €200,000.

On 27 July 2017, Cypriot First Division club Omonia Nicosia announced the signing of Antonia. He made his debut on 10 September against Ethnikos Achna on the first matchday of the 2017–18 season. He then moved to AEL Limassol in January 2019.

On 2 September 2019, Antonia signed a two-year contract with Cambuur as a free agent.

On 30 August 2021, he moved to NAC Breda on a two-year contract.

On 19 August 2023, Antonia joined TEC in the fourth-tier Derde Divisie. In the summer of 2025, he moved to Ajax Amateurs.

== International career ==
Antonia was born in the Netherlands to parents of Curaçaoan descent. He was called up to the Curaçao national football team in March 2016, and made his debut in a 1–0 loss to Barbados. Antonis scored his first international goal during the 2nd match for Curaçao vs. Saint Vincent and the Grenadines on 25 March 2021.

== Career statistics ==
=== International ===
Appearances and goals by national team and year
| National team | Year | Apps | Goals |
|---|---|---|---|
| Curaçao | 2016 | 6 | 0 |
| Curaçao | 2017 | 9 | 0 |
| Curaçao | 2018 | 2 | 0 |
| Curaçao | 2019 | 4 | 1 |
| Curaçao | 2020 | – | |
| Curaçao | 2021 | 7 | 1 |
| Total | | 28 | 1 |

Scores and results list Curaçao's goal tally first, score column indicates score after each Antonia goal.

List of international goals scored by Jarchinio Antonia
| No. | Date | Venue | Opponent | Score | Result | Competition |
|---|---|---|---|---|---|---|
| 1 | 25 March 2021 | Ergilio Hato Stadium, Willemstad, Curaçao | Saint Vincent and the Grenadines | 4–0 | 5–0 | 2022 FIFA World Cup qualification |

== Honours ==
=== Club ===
Groningen

- KNVB Cup: 2014–15

Cambuur

- Eerste Divisie: 2020–21

=== International ===
Curaçao

- Caribbean Cup: 2017
- King's Cup: 2019
