= Issa Kallon =

Sierra Leonean professional footballer (born 1996)

Personal information
- Date of birth: 3 January 1996 (age 30)
- Place of birth: Zeist, Netherlands
- Height: 1.63 m (5 ft 4 in)
- Positions: Winger; forward

Youth career
- 2003–2005: VV Jonathan
- 2005–2014: Vitesse

Senior career*
Years	Team	Apps	(Gls)
2014–2017	Utrecht	6	(0)
2016–2017	→ Emmen (loan)	37	(4)
2017–2022	Cambuur	143	(24)
2022–2023	Shanghai Port	41	(6)
2024	Nantong Zhiyun	22	(5)
2025	Chengdu Rongcheng	5	(0)

International career^{‡}
2010–2011	Netherlands U15	5	(1)
2011–2012	Netherlands U16	4	(1)
2012	Netherlands U17	5	(0)
2013	Netherlands U18	3	(0)
2013–2015	Netherlands U19	15	(2)
2015	Netherlands U20	1	(0)
2022–	Sierra Leone	4	(0)
- * Club domestic league appearances and goals as of 10 March 2026 ‡ National team caps and goals as of 21:47, 5 July 2022 (UTC)

Issa Kallon (born 3 January 1996) is a professional footballer who currently plays as a winger. Born in the Netherlands, he plays for the Sierra Leone national team.

== Club career ==
Kallon is a youth exponent from FC Utrecht. He made his Eredivisie debut at 24 August 2014 in a 1–2 away win against Feyenoord.

On 27 July 2016 he went on a 1-year loan to FC Emmen.

On 14 August 2017, Kallon joined SC Cambuur. He left the club after five years, on 30 June 2022, as his contract expired.

On 28 July 2022, Kallon joined Chinese Super League club Shanghai Port.

On 9 February 2024, Kallon joined fellow Chinese Super League club Nantong Zhiyun.

On 18 February 2025, Kallon joined Chinese Super League club Chengdu Rongcheng.

== International career ==
Born in the Netherlands, Kallon is of Sierra Leonean descent. He is a former youth international for the Netherlands. Kallon was included in the Sierra Leone squad for the 2022 Africa Cup of Nations. He debuted with Sierra Leone in a 2–2 tie with the Ivory Coast on 16 January 2022.

== Career statistics ==
As of match played on 29 June 2025

Appearances and goals by club, season and competition
Club	Season	League			Cup		Continental		Other		Total	
Club	Season	Division	Apps	Goals	Apps	Goals	Apps	Goals	Apps	Goals	Apps	Goals
Utrecht	2014–15	Eredivisie	5	0	0	0	—		—		5	0
Utrecht	2015–16	Eredivisie	1	0	0	0	—		—		1	0
Utrecht	Total		6	0	0	0	—		—		6	0
Emmen (loan)	2016–17	Eerste Divisie	37	4	4	1	—		4	1	41	5
Cambuur	2017–18	Eerste Divisie	31	2	3	1	—		1	1	35	4
Cambuur	2018–19	Eerste Divisie	27	0	3	0	—		4	0	34	0
Cambuur	2019–20	Eerste Divisie	22	6	1	0	—		—		23	6
Cambuur	2020–21	Eerste Divisie	31	11	1	0	—		—		32	11
Cambuur	2021–22	Eredivisie	32	5	1	0	—		—		33	5
Cambuur	Total		143	24	9	1	—		5	1	40	27
Shanghai Port	2022	Chinese Super League	18	1	3	1	—		—		21	2
Shanghai Port	2023	Chinese Super League	23	5	1	0	0	0	—		24	5
Shanghai Port	Total		41	6	4	1	0	0	—		45	7
Nantong Zhiyun	2024	Chinese Super League	22	5	0	0	—		—		22	5
Chengdu Rongcheng	2025	Chinese Super League	5	0	0	0	0	0	—		5	0
Career Total			254	39	17	3	0	0	9	2	280	44

== Honours ==
Cambuur

- Eerste Divisie: 2020–21

Shanghai Port

- Chinese Super League: 2023
