= Mees Hoedemakers =

Dutch footballer (born 1998)

Personal information
- Date of birth: 18 February 1998 (age 28)
- Place of birth: Zaandam, Netherlands
- Height: 1.81 m (5 ft 11 in)
- Position: Midfielder

Team information
- Current team: Almere City FC (on loan from Viborg)
- Number: 14

Youth career
- –2009: Hercules Zaandam
- 2009–2017: AZ

Senior career*
Years	Team	Apps	(Gls)
2016–2020	Jong AZ	60	(4)
2018–2020	AZ	1	(0)
2019–2020	→ Cambuur (loan)	29	(1)
2020–2023	Cambuur	94	(9)
2023–2025	NEC	57	(1)
2025–	Viborg	20	(1)
2026–	→ Almere City	10	(0)

International career
2013–2014	Netherlands U16	9	(0)
2015	Netherlands U17	1	(0)
2016	Netherlands U19	1	(0)
- * Club domestic league appearances and goals as of 23 October 2026

Mees Hoedemakers (born 18 February 1998) is a Dutch professional footballer who plays as a midfielder for Eerste Divisie club Almere City FC.

== Club career ==
Hoedemakers made his Eerste Divisie debut for Jong AZ on 18 August 2017 in a game against FC Den Bosch.

He was sent to SC Cambuur on loan with option to purchase, in July 2019.

In the summer of 2023, Hoedemakers signed a four-year contract with NEC Nijmegen.

After two years with Nijmegen, Hoedemakers was sold to Danish club Viborg. He signed a three-year contract with the club and was assigned the number 4 shirt.

Hoedemakers was loaned to Eerste Divisie club Almere City FC on 4 August 2026 for the remainder of the 2026–27 season.

== International career ==
Hoedemakers played 9 games for the Netherlands national under-16 football team.
