= Jamie Jacobs (footballer) =

Dutch footballer (born 1997)

Personal information
- Date of birth: 3 December 1997 (age 28)
- Place of birth: Purmerend, Netherlands
- Height: 1.82 m (6 ft 0 in)
- Position: Midfielder

Team information
- Current team: Almere City
- Number: 23

Youth career
- FC Purmerend
- –2016: Volendam

Senior career*
Years	Team	Apps	(Gls)
2017–2019	Jong AZ	61	(14)
2019–2023	Cambuur	107	(27)
2023–2024	Viborg	13	(0)
2024–2025	Volendam	31	(5)
2025–	Almere City	9	(1)
- * Club domestic league appearances and goals as of 25 April 2026

Jamie Jacobs (born 3 December 1997) is a Dutch professional footballer who plays as a midfielder for Eerste Divisie club Almere City.

== Club career ==
He made his Eerste Divisie debut for Jong AZ on 18 August 2017 in a game against FC Den Bosch.

He moved to SC Cambuur in July 2019.

On 16 August 2023, Jacobs joined Viborg in Denmark on a two-year contract.

On 2 September 2024 Dutch side FC Volendam confirmed that Jacobs joined the club on a deal until June 2025.

On 17 July 2025, Jacobs signed a two-season contract with Almere City, joining his brother Joey at the club.

== Personal life ==
He is the brother of fellow professional footballer Joey Jacobs.
