= Robin Maulun =

French footballer (born 1996)

Personal information
- Date of birth: 23 November 1996 (age 29)
- Place of birth: Pessac, France
- Height: 1.76 m (5 ft 9 in)
- Position: Midfielder

Team information
- Current team: SC Sagamihara

Youth career
- 2002–2003: Targon-Soulignac
- 2003–2009: Libourne
- 2009–2012: Bordeaux

Senior career*
Years	Team	Apps	(Gls)
2012–2017	Bordeaux II	52	(6)
2016–2017	Bordeaux	2	(0)
2017–2018	Trélissac	22	(2)
2018–2023	Cambuur	120	(18)
2023–2024	Volendam	14	(0)
2025–	SC Sagamihara	0	(0)

International career
2011	France U16	6	(1)
2012	France U17	2	(0)
- * Club domestic league appearances and goals as of 17 January 2025, 12:22 (UTC)

Robin Maulun (born 23 November 1996) is a French professional footballer who plays as a midfielder for J3 League club SC Sagamihara.

== Club career ==
Maulun made his first-team debut for Bordeaux on 30 July 2015, being introduced in the 84nd minute of his club's first leg match against Cypriot side AEK Larnaca in the third qualifying round for the Europa League before making his full debut in the second leg on 6 August 2015. On 14 May 2016, he debuted in Ligue 1 being brought onto the pitch in the 39th minute for the injured Pablo. He extended his contract with Cambuur until 2023 in January 2021.

On 19 September 2023, Maulun signed a two-year contract with an option for an additional year with Eredivisie club Volendam. In May 2024, Maulun and Volendam were relegated from the Eredivisie following a defeat against Ajax.

On 3 September 2024, Maulun's contract with Volendam was terminated by mutual consent.

On 17 January 2025, Maulun moved abroad to Japan for the first time and joined J3 club SC Sagamihara for 2025 season.

== Honours ==
Cambuur

- Eerste Divisie: 2020–21
