= 2019–20 Eerste Divisie =

64th season of the second-tier football league in Netherlands

Eerste Divisie
- Season: 2019–20
- Champions: None
- Promoted: None
- Relegated: None
- Matches: 290
- Goals: 953 (3.29 per match)
- Top goalscorer: Robert Mühren (26)
- Biggest home win: Jong Ajax 6–0 Eindhoven (4 October 2019)
- Biggest away win: Telstar 1–7 NEC (7 February 2020)
- Highest scoring: Excelsior 6–4 Den Bosch (21 February 2020)
- Longest winning run: 8 matches Volendam
- Longest unbeaten run: 19 matches Go Ahead Eagles
- Longest winless run: 18 matches Helmond Sport
- Longest losing run: 5 matches Dordrecht; Helmond Sport
- Highest attendance: 18,427; NAC Breda 1–0 NEC (4 October 2019)
- Lowest attendance: 250; Jong PSV 1–3 NAC Breda (25 November 2019)
- Total attendance: 1,230,171
- Average attendance: 4,242

The 2019–20 Eerste Divisie, known as Keuken Kampioen Divisie for sponsorship reasons, was the sixty-fourth season of Eerste Divisie since its establishment in 1955. It began in August 2019 with the first matches of the season and was scheduled to end in May 2020 with the finals of the promotion/relegation play-offs, also involving the 16th-placed team from the 2019–20 Eredivisie. The season was temporarily halted in March 2020, then postponed for several weeks and later abandoned altogether due to the global COVID-19 pandemic and consequent Dutch government decision to disallow all large-scale events until 1 September 2020.

== Effects of the 2020 coronavirus pandemic ==
On 12 March 2020, all football leagues were suspended until 31 March as the Dutch government forbade events due to the COVID-19 pandemic in the Netherlands. On 15 March this period was extended until 6 April. Due to the decision of the Dutch government to forbid all gatherings and events until 1 June 2020, this period was even further extended.

The Dutch government announced on 21 April that all events subject to authorization, would remain forbidden at least until 1 September 2020. As a result, the KNVB announced the same day, the intention not to continue all remaining suspended competitions. A final decision would be taken after consultation with the UEFA and next the consequences would be discussed with the clubs involved.

On 24 April 2020 the season was cancelled.

== Teams ==
A total of 20 teams took part in the league. FC Twente gained promotion to the Eredivisie, and was replaced by NAC Breda, who finished bottom in the 2018–19 Eredivisie. Sparta Rotterdam and RKC Waalwijk won the post-season playoff, and were replaced in the 2019–20 Eerste Divisie by Excelsior and De Graafschap.

At an extraordinary KNVB federation meeting on 7 June 2018, representatives of amateur and professional football reached an agreement to renew the football pyramid as of the 2019–20 season. Part of the Agreement was that no promotion/relegation would take place between the Eerste and Tweede Divisie this season.

Location of teams in the Eerste Divisie 2019–20

Club	Location	Venue	Capacity
Almere City FC	Almere	Yanmar Stadion	3,000
SC Cambuur	Leeuwarden	Cambuurstadion	10,250
De Graafschap	Doetinchem	Stadion De Vijverberg	12,600
FC Den Bosch	's-Hertogenbosch	Stadion De Vliert	8,713
FC Dordrecht	Dordrecht	Riwal Hoogwerkers Stadion	4,235
FC Eindhoven	Eindhoven	Jan Louwers Stadion	4,600
Excelsior Rotterdam	Rotterdam	Van Donge & De Roo Stadion	4,500
Go Ahead Eagles	Deventer	De Adelaarshorst	10,000
Helmond Sport	Helmond	SolarUnie Stadion	4,174
Jong Ajax	Amsterdam	Sportpark De Toekomst	2,050; 53,502
Jong AZ	Alkmaar	AFAS Trainingscomplex	200; 17,023
Jong PSV	Eindhoven	PSV Campus De Herdgang	2,500; 36,500; 4,600
Jong FC Utrecht	Utrecht	Sportcomplex Zoudenbalch	550; 23,750
MVV Maastricht	Maastricht	Stadion De Geusselt	10,000
NAC Breda	Breda	Rat Verlegh Stadion	19,000
NEC Nijmegen	Nijmegen	Goffertstadion	12,500
Roda JC Kerkrade	Kerkrade	Parkstad Limburg Stadion	19,979
Telstar	Velsen	Rabobank IJmond Stadion	3,060
TOP Oss	Oss	Frans Heesenstadion	4,560
Volendam	Volendam	Kras Stadion	7,384

=== Personnel and kits ===
Club	Manager	Kit manufacturer	Sponsors
Almere City FC	(Denmark) Ole Tobiasen (ad int.)	Inaria	S&S Online Marketing
SC Cambuur	(Netherlands) Henk de Jong	Craft	Bouwgroep Dijkstra Draisma
De Graafschap	(Netherlands) Mike Snoei	Hummel	Agri Bio Source Europe B.V.
FC Den Bosch	(Netherlands) Erik van der Ven	Masita	Timmermans Infra BV
FC Dordrecht	(Netherlands) Harry van den Ham (ad int.)	Jartazi	Riwal Hoogwerkers
FC Eindhoven	(Netherlands) Ernie Brandts	Nike	VDL Groep
Excelsior Rotterdam	(Netherlands) Marinus Dijkhuizen	Quick	DSW Zorgverzekeraar
Go Ahead Eagles	(Netherlands) Jack de Gier	Hummel	Thermen Bussloo
Helmond Sport	(Netherlands) Wil Boessen	Saller	Vescom
Jong Ajax	(Netherlands) Mitchell van der Gaag	Adidas	Ziggo
Jong AZ	(Netherlands) Koen Stam (Netherlands) Michel Vonk	Under Armour	AFAS Software
Jong PSV	(Netherlands) Peter Uneken	Umbro	Metropoolregio Brainport Eindhoven
Jong FC Utrecht	(Netherlands) René Hake	Nike	Zorg van de Zaak
MVV Maastricht	(Turkey) Fuat Usta	Masita	Open Line
NAC Breda	(Germany) Peter Hyballa	Legea	OK tankstations
NEC Nijmegen	(Netherlands) Adrie Bogers	Legea	De Klok Groep
Roda JC Kerkrade	Vacant	Legea	MASCOT Workwear
Telstar	(Netherlands) Andries Jonker	Robey	
TOP Oss	(Netherlands) Klaas Wels	Erima	Best Practise
FC Volendam	(Netherlands) Wim Jonk	Jako	HSB Bouw

== Standings ==
As the competition was cancelled, below is the situation on 9 March 2020, the date the last matches were played.

Pos	Team	Pld	W	D	L	GF	GA	GD	Pts
1	SC Cambuur	29	21	3	5	68	25	+43	66
2	De Graafschap (Note: Winner of the Third Period (games 20-28).)	29	17	11	1	63	28	+35	62
3	FC Volendam (Note: Winner of the Second Period (games 10-19).)	29	16	7	6	57	42	+15	55
4	Jong Ajax (Note: Reserves teams are not eligible to be promoted to the 2020–21 Eredivisie.)	29	16	6	7	72	47	+25	54
5	NAC Breda (Note: Winner of the First Period (games 1-9).)	29	14	8	7	48	30	+18	50
6	Go Ahead Eagles	29	12	12	5	49	41	+8	48
7	Excelsior	29	13	8	8	65	55	+10	47
8	NEC Nijmegen	29	12	9	8	51	37	+14	45
9	Almere City FC	29	13	5	11	44	42	+2	44
10	Telstar	29	12	8	9	47	48	−1	44
11	FC Den Bosch (Note: Den Bosch were deducted three points for not meeting budget requirements to create a healthy financial position.)	29	10	11	8	56	49	+7	38
12	Jong FC Utrecht	29	10	8	11	48	47	+1	38
13	FC Eindhoven	29	9	7	13	46	59	−13	34
14	Jong AZ	29	7	7	15	45	61	−16	28
15	MVV Maastricht	29	7	6	16	37	53	−16	27
16	TOP Oss	29	6	7	16	28	53	−25	25
17	Roda JC Kerkrade (Note: Roda JC Kerkrade were deducted three points for violating license regulations.)	29	5	10	14	36	52	−16	22
18	Jong PSV	29	5	7	17	34	56	−22	22
19	FC Dordrecht	29	4	8	17	34	66	−32	20
20	Helmond Sport	29	3	8	18	25	62	−37	17

Updated to match(es) played on 9 March 2020. Source: Soccerway, Keuken Kampioen Divisie (in Dutch)
Rules for classification: Season in progress: 1) Most points won; 2) Fewest points lost; 3) Goal difference; 4) Goals scored; 5) Alphabetical order; End of season: 1) Points; 2) Goal difference; 3) Goals scored; 4) Head-to-head points; 5) Head-to-head goal difference; 6) Head-to-head away goals scored; 7) Play-off if relevant for deciding champion, relegation or participating in a European league, otherwise by draw. 8) Penalty shoot-out (only after a play-off)

=== Positions by round ===
The table lists the positions of teams after completion of each round.

Team ╲ Round	1	2	3	4	5	6	7	8	9	10	11	12	13	14	15	16	17	18	19	20	21	22	23	24	25	26	27	28	29	30	31	32	33	34	35	36	37	38
SC Cambuur	20	8	12	9	6	4	3	2	2	1	1	1	1	1	1	1	1	1	1	1	1	2	1	1	1	1	1	1	1	1								
De Graafschap	1	3	1	1	2	1	1	3	3	2	2	2	2	2	2	2	2	3	3	3	3	3	3	4	3	2	2	2	2	2								
FC Volendam	10	5	9	7	10	11	7	10	10	12	14	13	12	10	8	6	5	4	4	4	4	4	4	3	4	3	4	4	3									
Jong Ajax	16	12	8	5	3	6	6	5	4	4	4	3	4	3	3	3	3	2	2	2	2	1	2	2	2	4	3	3	4									
NAC Breda	3	1	2	3	1	2	2	1	1	3	3	4	3	4	4	5	4	5	7	6	6	5	6	6	6	6	6	6	5									
Go Ahead Eagles	4	11	5	10	12	9	9	9	9	8	7	9	8	7	5	7	7	7	6	5	5	6	5	5	5	5	5	5	6									
Excelsior	2	4	6	4	5	3	5	4	6	5	5	5	5	5	6	8	6	6	5	7	7	7	8	7	7	8	7	7	7									
NEC Nijmegen	17	14	10	6	8	10	12	11	12	10	8	6	6	6	7	4	8	8	10	9	8	8	9	9	8	7	8	8	8									
Almere City FC	9	6	7	13	9	12	10	8	7	7	9	8	10	8	9	11	11	11	9	8	10	10	10	10	9	10	12	9	9									
Telstar	14	7	4	8	11	8	11	12	13	14	11	10	7	9	10	9	10	10	11	10	9	9	7	8	10	11	9	10	10									
FC Den Bosch	7	15	16	16	18	19	15	13	11	13	13	14	14	14	15	14	12	12	12	11	11	12	12	11	11	9	10	11	11									
Jong FC Utrecht	19	10	15	11	7	7	4	7	5	6	6	7	9	11	12	10	9	9	8	12	12	11	11	12	12	12	11	12	12									
FC Eindhoven	5	2	3	2	4	5	8	6	8	9	10	12	11	12	11	12	13	13	13	13	14	13	14	14	14	15	13	13	13	13								
Jong AZ	13	16	11	14	14	14	17	16	16	19	16	17	19	15	14	15	15	14	14	14	13	14	13	13	13	13	14	14	14									
MVV Maastricht	15	19	14	12	13	13	14	15	19	18	18	19	17	19	19	16	17	17	17	15	15	15	15	15	15	14	15	15	15									
TOP Oss	6	9	13	15	16	17	13	14	17	17	19	16	16	18	18	19	18	18	18	18	18	17	18	18	17	17	17	16	16									
Roda JC Kerkrade	12	18	19	19	17	15	18	17	14	11	12	11	13	13	13	13	14	15	15	16	16	16	17	17	18	18	18	17	17									
Jong PSV	8	13	18	18	20	18	20	20	18	15	17	18	18	17	17	18	16	16	16	17	17	18	16	16	16	16	16	18	18									
FC Dordrecht	18	20	20	20	19	20	16	18	20	20	20	20	20	20	20	20	20	20	20	20	20	20	20	19	19	19	19	19	19									
Helmond Sport	11	17	17	17	15	16	19	19	15	16	15	15	15	16	16	17	19	19	19	19	19	19	19	20	20	20	20	20	20									

~~Champion and promotion to the Eredivisie~~
~~Promotion to the Eredivisie~~
~~Qualification to promotion play-offs~~
Reserves teams aren't eligible to be promoted to the Eredivisie

Source: worldfootball.net

== Period tables ==
=== Period 1 ===
Pos	Team	Pld	W	D	L	GF	GA	GD	Pts	Qualification
1	NAC Breda	9	7	1	1	15	5	+10	22	~~Qualification to promotion play-offs~~
2	SC Cambuur	9	7	0	2	24	6	+18	21	
3	De Graafschap	9	5	4	0	17	4	+13	19	
4	Jong Ajax	9	5	2	2	27	14	+13	17	Reserves teams cannot participate in the promotion play-offs
5	Jong FC Utrecht	9	5	2	2	19	12	+7	17	Reserves teams cannot participate in the promotion play-offs
6	Excelsior	9	5	1	3	19	17	+2	16	
7	Almere City FC	9	4	3	2	15	14	+1	15	
8	FC Eindhoven	9	4	2	3	15	17	−2	14	
9	Go Ahead Eagles	9	3	4	2	17	17	0	13	
10	FC Volendam	9	3	2	4	11	15	−4	11	
11	FC Den Bosch	9	2	4	3	18	16	+2	10	
12	NEC Nijmegen	9	2	4	3	16	17	−1	10	
13	Telstar	9	3	1	5	11	15	−4	10	
14	Roda JC Kerkrade	9	2	3	4	9	15	−6	9	
15	Helmond Sport	9	2	3	4	10	19	−9	9	
16	Jong AZ	9	1	4	4	11	14	−3	7	Reserves teams cannot participate in the promotion play-offs
17	TOP Oss	9	2	1	6	8	14	−6	7	
18	Jong PSV	9	2	1	6	12	20	−8	7	Reserves teams cannot participate in the promotion play-offs
19	MVV Maastricht	9	2	1	6	8	20	−12	7	
20	FC Dordrecht	9	1	3	5	12	23	−11	6	

Source: Keuken Kampioen Divisie (in Dutch)
Rules for classification: 1) points; 2) goal difference; 3) number of goals scored

=== Period 2 ===
Pos	Team	Pld	W	D	L	GF	GA	GD	Pts	Qualification
1	FC Volendam	10	8	1	1	23	12	+11	25	~~Qualification to promotion play-offs~~
2	Jong Ajax	10	7	1	2	25	12	+13	22	Reserves teams cannot participate in the promotion play-offs
3	SC Cambuur	10	6	3	1	21	9	+12	21	
4	Go Ahead Eagles	10	4	6	0	15	7	+8	18	
5	Excelsior	10	5	3	2	21	16	+5	18	
6	De Graafschap	10	4	5	1	21	12	+9	17	
7	NEC Nijmegen	10	5	2	3	14	9	+5	17	
8	Telstar	10	4	4	2	18	14	+4	16	
9	FC Den Bosch	10	3	6	1	15	15	0	15	
10	Jong AZ	10	4	1	5	19	20	−1	13	Reserves teams cannot participate in the promotion play-offs
11	Almere City FC	10	4	1	5	15	16	−1	13	
12	Roda JC Kerkrade	10	2	5	3	15	15	0	11	
13	Jong FC Utrecht	10	2	5	3	11	15	−4	11	Reserves teams cannot participate in the promotion play-offs
14	NAC Breda	10	2	3	5	14	16	−2	9	Period 1 winner
15	MVV Maastricht	10	2	3	5	11	16	−5	9	
16	Jong PSV	10	2	3	5	10	16	−6	9	Reserves teams cannot participate in the promotion play-offs
17	Eindhoven	10	2	2	6	16	25	−9	8	
18	TOP Oss	10	2	2	6	9	23	−14	8	
19	FC Dordrecht	10	1	2	7	13	25	−12	5	
20	Helmond Sport	10	1	2	7	11	24	−13	5	

Source: Keuken Kampioen Divisie (in Dutch)
Rules for classification: 1) points; 2) goal difference; 3) number of goals scored

=== Period 3 ===
Pos	Team	Pld	W	D	L	GF	GA	GD	Pts	Qualification
1	De Graafschap	9	7	2	0	23	11	+12	23	~~Qualification to promotion play-offs~~
2	SC Cambuur	9	7	0	2	20	10	+10	21	
3	Go Ahead Eagles	9	5	2	2	16	15	+1	17	
4	NAC Breda	9	4	4	1	15	8	+7	16	Period 1 winner
5	FC Den Bosch	9	5	1	3	22	16	+6	16	
6	FC Volendam	9	4	4	1	19	15	+4	16	Period 2 winner
7	NEC Nijmegen	9	4	3	2	19	10	+9	15	
8	Jong Ajax	9	4	3	2	20	17	+3	15	Reserves teams cannot participate in the promotion play-offs
9	Telstar	9	4	3	2	17	19	−2	15	
10	Almere City FC	9	4	1	4	12	11	+1	13	
11	MVV Maastricht	9	3	2	4	18	14	+4	11	
12	FC Eindhoven	9	3	2	4	13	15	−2	11	
13	Excelsior	9	2	4	3	22	22	0	10	
14	Jong FC Utrecht	9	3	1	5	17	18	−1	10	Reserves teams cannot participate in the promotion play-offs
15	TOP Oss	9	2	3	4	9	14	−5	9	
16	Jong AZ	9	2	2	5	15	24	−9	8	Reserves teams cannot participate in the promotion play-offs
17	FC Dordrecht	9	2	2	5	8	17	−9	8	
18	Jong PSV	9	1	3	5	12	19	−7	6	Reserves teams cannot participate in the promotion play-offs
19	Roda JC Kerkrade	9	1	2	6	11	18	−7	5	
20	Helmond Sport	9	0	2	7	3	18	−15	2	

Source: Keuken Kampioen Divisie (in Dutch)
Rules for classification: 1) points; 2) goal difference; 3) number of goals scored

=== Period 4 ===
Pos	Team	Pld	W	D	L	GF	GA	GD	Pts	Qualification
1	FC Volendam	1	1	0	0	4	0	+4	3	Period 2 winner
2	NAC Breda	1	1	0	0	4	1	+3	3	Period 1 winner
3	Excelsior	1	1	0	0	3	0	+3	3	
4	SC Cambuur	1	1	0	0	3	0	+3	3	
5	Almere City FC	1	1	0	0	2	1	+1	3	
6	De Graafschap	1	1	0	0	2	1	+1	3	Period 3 winner
7	NEC Nijmegen	1	1	0	0	2	1	+1	3	
8	Telstar	1	1	0	0	1	0	+1	3	
9	FC Eindhoven	1	0	1	0	2	2	0	1	
10	TOP Oss	1	0	1	0	2	2	0	1	
11	FC Dordrecht	1	0	1	0	1	1	0	1	
12	Helmond Sport	1	0	1	0	1	1	0	1	
13	FC Den Bosch	1	0	0	1	1	2	−1	0	
14	Go Ahead Eagles	1	0	0	1	1	2	−1	0	
15	Jong FC Utrecht	1	0	0	1	1	2	−1	0	Reserves teams cannot participate in the promotion play-offs
16	Jong PSV	1	0	0	1	0	1	−1	0	Reserves teams cannot participate in the promotion play-offs
17	Roda JC Kerkrade	1	0	0	1	1	4	−3	0	
18	Jong AZ	1	0	0	1	0	3	−3	0	Reserves teams cannot participate in the promotion play-offs
19	MVV Maastricht	1	0	0	1	0	3	−3	0	
20	Jong Ajax	1	0	0	1	0	4	−4	0	Reserves teams cannot participate in the promotion play-offs

Source: Keuken Kampioen Divisie (in Dutch)
Rules for classification: 1) points; 2) goal difference; 3) number of goals scored

== Fixtures/results ==
Home \ Away	ALM	CAM	DBO	DOR	EIN	EXC	GAE	GRA	HEL	JAJ	JAZ	JPS	JUT	MVV	NAC	NEC	RJC	TEL	TOP	VOL
Almere City		0–1	0–2	3–2	3–1		1–1	0–2	2–0		2–1	3–2			1–0		2–0	4–2	3–0	1–0
Cambuur	3–1		3–2			4–0	5–0		5–1	0–2	3–1	4–2	3–1	2–1		0–0	2–0		5–1	1–2
Den Bosch	1–2			3–2	1–1	3–3	2–3	2–2	1–1		3–0	2–1	3–2	4–0		2–2	0–0	0–1	4–0	
Dordrecht	1–2	2–4			1–0	1–1		1–2	1–2	2–5			2–5	1–1	0–2	2–0	1–1	2–3	1–1	
Eindhoven		0–3		5–1		3–1	2–1	1–1	2–0		2–1	1–1		2–0	2–2	1–4	1–1	4–1	2–2	1–4
Excelsior	4–2	1–3	6–4	3–2	5–4				3–1	1–3	3–3	5–2	2–0	3–0	2–2	2–1		3–3		1–2
Go Ahead Eagles	1–1		0–0	3–1	3–1	2–2		1–2		1–1	1–1	1–1	4–0	3–2	1–0	2–1	1–1			3–0
De Graafschap	0–0	2–0		5–0	4–0	0–0	1–1			3–2	5–1	4–1	2–1	3–2			2–0	2–2		3–0
Helmond Sport	1–1		0–0	1–1	1–0	1–4	1–2	1–2		0–2		2–3		3–1	0–0	1–2		1–4	0–2	1–1
Jong Ajax	3–2		5–1	2–0	6–0		5–1		1–1			2–0	4–0		2–4	3–3	2–0	2–2	2–0	1–3
Jong AZ	3–1	0–3	2–2	1–1	2–4	1–2		2–1	4–1	3–2				3–2	1–2	0–2		0–0	3–1	1–1
Jong PSV		0–1	2–2	0–1	2–1	2–1		2–3		0–0	3–2			0–1	1–3		1–1	1–1	1–1	3–1
Jong Utrecht	3–1	1–1	5–1	1–1	2–2		0–3	2–2	1–1	7–2	2–1	3–0				1–2	2–1		2–1	2–1
MVV	3–2	0–0	2–3			0–0	3–0	0–3	4–1	1–4		3–1	1–1			0–0	1–0	1–2	4–0	
NAC Breda	1–0	1–0	1–2	3–0		2–1	1–1	1–2	5–1	1–2	3–1		0–0	2–0		1–0	4–1		1–1	
NEC	2–3	0–2	1–0		1–2		3–3	1–1	2–0	3–3		1–0	0–0	2–0	1–1			4–2	3–0	
Roda JC Kerkrade	1–1	1–2	1–5	5–0		1–4		1–1	4–0		2–2		1–3	2–2	4–2	1–2			2–1	2–3
Telstar	1–0	0–2			2–0	3–0	0–2			2–3	3–1	1–0	2–0	2–1	1–1	1–7	1–2		1–0	1–2
TOP Oss		3–2		1–3	3–1	0–2	1–2	0–0		2–1	1–2	1–0	2–1		0–1		0–0	2–2		1–2
Volendam		0–4	1–1	1–1			2–2	3–3	2–1	4–0	3–2	4–2	1–0	4–1	2–1	3–1	4–0	1–1		

Source: Soccerway, Keuken Kampioen Divisie (in Dutch)
Legend: Blue = home team win; Yellow = draw; Red = away team win.

=== Results by round ===
Team ╲ Round	1	2	3	4	5	6	7	8	9	10	11	12	13	14	15	16	17	18	19	20	21	22	23	24	25	26	27	28	29
Almere City	D	W	D	L	W	L	W	W	D	D	L	W	L	W	L	L	L	W	W	W	D	L	L	W	W	L	L	W	W
Cambuur	L	W	L	W	W	W	W	W	W	D	W	D	D	W	W	W	W	W	L	W	L	L	W	W	W	W	W	W	W
Den Bosch	D	L	D	L	L	D	W	D	W	D	D	D	D	L	D	W	W	D	W	W	L	L	D	W	W	W	L	W	L
Dordrecht	L	L	L	D	D	D	W	L	L	L	L	L	D	L	D	L	L	L	W	L	D	L	W	D	L	W	L	L	D
Eindhoven	W	W	D	W	L	D	L	W	L	L	D	L	W	L	W	L	L	L	D	L	L	W	L	D	L	D	W	W	D
Excelsior	W	W	L	W	D	W	L	W	L	W	D	L	D	W	D	L	W	W	W	L	D	D	L	D	W	D	W	L	W
Go Ahead Eagles	W	L	W	L	D	W	D	D	D	D	W	D	D	W	W	D	D	D	W	W	D	W	W	L	W	L	W	D	L
De Graafschap	W	W	W	D	D	W	W	D	D	W	D	W	D	W	L	W	D	D	D	D	W	W	W	D	W	W	W	W	W
Helmond Sport	D	L	D	L	W	L	L	D	W	L	W	L	D	L	D	L	L	L	L	L	D	L	D	L	L	L	L	L	D
Jong Ajax	L	D	W	W	W	L	D	W	W	W	L	W	L	W	D	W	W	W	W	W	D	W	D	W	L	L	W	D	L
Jong AZ	D	L	W	D	L	L	L	D	D	L	W	L	L	W	W	L	L	W	D	L	W	L	W	L	D	D	L	L	L
Jong PSV	D	L	L	L	L	W	L	L	W	W	L	L	D	D	L	L	W	D	L	L	D	L	W	L	L	D	D	L	L
Jong Utrecht	L	W	L	W	W	D	W	D	W	L	D	D	L	L	D	W	W	D	D	L	L	W	L	D	W	L	W	L	L
MVV	L	L	W	W	D	L	L	L	L	D	D	L	W	L	L	W	L	D	L	W	D	D	L	W	L	W	L	L	L
NAC Breda	W	W	W	L	W	D	W	W	W	L	D	L	D	L	W	L	W	D	L	W	D	W	L	D	D	W	W	D	W
NEC	L	D	W	W	D	D	L	D	L	W	W	W	D	W	D	W	L	L	L	W	W	D	D	L	W	W	L	D	W
Roda JC Kerkrade	D	L	L	L	W	D	L	D	W	W	D	W	D	L	D	D	L	L	D	L	D	L	L	D	L	L	L	W	L
Telstar	D	W	W	L	L	W	L	L	L	D	W	W	W	D	L	W	L	D	D	W	W	D	W	L	L	D	W	D	W
TOP Oss	W	L	L	D	L	L	W	L	L	D	L	W	D	L	L	L	W	L	L	L	L	W	L	D	D	L	D	W	D
Volendam	D	W	L	W	L	D	W	L	L	D	L	W	W	W	W	W	W	W	W	D	W	W	W	W	D	D	L	D	W

Source: worldfootball.net

== Season statistics ==
=== Top scorers ===
Rank	Player	Club	Games	Goal	Penalty scored	avg.
1	(Netherlands) Robert Mühren	Cambuur	29	26	9	0.9
2	(Netherlands) Reda Kharchouch	Telstar	28	20	2	0.71
3	(Netherlands) Anthony van den Hurk	MVV	27	17	2	0.63
4	(Netherlands) Ralf Seuntjens	De Graafschap	28	16	2	0.57
5	(Portugal) Pedro Marques	Den Bosch (~~Dordrecht~~)	26	14	5	0.54
5	(Netherlands) Rai Vloet	Excelsior	29	14	0	0.48
7	(Burkina Faso) Lassina Traoré	Jong Ajax	17	13	1	0.76
7	(Netherlands) Zian Flemming	NEC	24	13	4	0.54
9	(Netherlands) Jamie Jacobs	Cambuur	23	12	0	0.52
9	(Portugal) Rúben Rodrigues	Den Bosch	27	12	0	0.44
9	(Iceland) Elías Már Ómarsson	Excelsior	28	12	0	0.43
9	(England) Ike Ugbo	Roda JC Kerkrade	28	12	0	0.43

Source: nos.nl

=== Hat-tricks(+) ===
Rnd	Player	Club	Goals	Date	Home	Score	Away
2	(Portugal) Marcelo Lopes	Eindhoven	45' 62' 81'	16 August 2019	Eindhoven	5–1	Dordrecht
8	(Netherlands) Robert Mühren	Cambuur	19' (pen.) 45'+1' 69'	27 September 2019	Volendam	0–4	Cambuur
9	(Netherlands) Hicham Acheffay	Jong Utrecht	4' 29' 66'	4 October 2019	Dordrecht	2–5	Jong Utrecht
10	(Burkina Faso) Lassina Traoré	Jong Ajax	15' 63' 69'	21 October 2019	Jong Ajax	4–0	Jong Utrecht
10	(Netherlands) Roland Alberg	Roda JC Kerkrade	14' 47' 48'	12 October 2019	Roda JC Kerkrade	4–0	Helmond Sport
11	(Netherlands) Issa Kallon	Cambuur	10' 49' 73' 79'	18 October 2019	Cambuur	5–1	TOP Oss
18	(Netherlands) Zakaria Aboukhlal	Jong AZ	61' 73' 85' (pen.) 86'	9 December 2019	Jong AZ	4–1	Helmond Sport
24	(Netherlands) Anthony van den Hurk	MVV	50' 71' 89'	31 January 2020	MVV	3–1	Jong PSV
24	(Brazil) Danilo	Jong Ajax	12' (pen.) 33' 55'	3 February 2020	Jong Ajax	5–1	Go Ahead Eagles
27	(Portugal) Pedro Marques	Den Bosch	49' 62' 71'	21 February 2020	Excelsior	6–4	Den Bosch

=== Assists ===
Rank	Player	Club	Games	Assist	avg.
1	(Netherlands) Danny Verbeek	Den Bosch	29	13	0.45
2	(Netherlands) Ralf Seuntjens	De Graafschap	28	10	0.36
2	(Netherlands) Gijs Smal	Volendam	28	10	0.36
4	(Netherlands) Branco van den Boomen	De Graafschap (~~Eindhoven~~)	27	9	0.33
5	(England) Derry Murkin	Volendam	20	7	0.35
5	(France) Robin Maulun	Cambuur	23	7	0.3
5	(Germany) Joshua Holtby	MVV	25	7	0.28
5	(Germany) Jonas Arweiler	Jong Utrecht	26	7	0.27
5	(Portugal) Rúben Rodrigues	Den Bosch	27	7	0.26
5	(Netherlands) Joël Zwarts	Excelsior	28	7	0.25
5	(Netherlands) Robert Mühren	Cambuur	29	7	0.24
5	(Czech Republic) Jaroslav Navrátil	Go Ahead Eagles	29	7	0.24

Source: nos.nl

=== Attendance ===
Home ╲ Away	ALM	CAM	DBO	DOR	EIN	EXC	GAE	GRA	HEL	JAJ	JAZ	JPS	JUT	MVV	NAC	NEC	RJC	TEL	TOP	VOL	Tot	Avg	Max	Min
Almere City		2,840	2,000	1,837	1,821		2,264	3,484	2,589		2,376	1,884			2,255		1,999	2,339	1,626	1,866	31,180	2,227	3,484	1,626
Cambuur	9,264		7,242			8,742	7,531		7,432	8,763	7,532	8,326	8,265	8,174		8,675	8,421		8,243	9,163	115,773	8,270	9,264	7,242
Den Bosch	2,019			2,593	2,852	3,178	3,122	3,123	3,041		2,674	3,023	2,373	2,937		3,398	3,970	2,855	3,833		44,991	2,999	3,970	2,019
Dordrecht	1,650	1,578			2,022	2,225		2,022	1,450	1,972			1,450	1,331	2,525	1,718	1,185	1,490	1,322		23,940	1,710	2,525	1,185
Eindhoven		2,192		2,381		1,957	2,381	2,128	3,011		2,148	2,831		2,532	3,251	2,048	2,732	1,934	3,842	1,878	37,246	2,483	3,842	1,878
Excelsior	2,975	3,612	2,815	3,300	3,165				2,683	3,571	2,712	2,715	3,062	2,750	4,046	3,384		2,722		3,504	47,016	3,134	4,046	2,683
Go Ahead Eagles	8,467		8,423	8,109	8,231	7,897		9,463		8,271	8,103	7,446	8,023	8,221	8,855	8,162	8,688			8,287	124,646	8,310	9,463	7,446
De Graafschap	9,232	9,702		9,053	9,065	9,511	11,123			9,504	9,945	9,210	9,511	9,509			9,711	9,311		9,503	133,890	9,564	11,123	9,053
Helmond Sport	1,652		1,524	1,554	1,735	1,337	1,241	1,656		1,467		1,209		1,134	2,314	1,705		1,732	1,346	1,200	22,806	1,520	2,314	1,134
Jong Ajax	1,000		555	517	590		902		410			1,450	840		1,452	800	641	1,051	588	734	11,530	824	1,452	410
Jong AZ	450	700	400	400	350	500		500	300	750				400	500	450		850	350	800	7,700	513	850	300
Jong PSV		550	953	357	803	506		879		1,285	412			593	250		748	412	385	463	8,596	614	1,285	250
Jong Utrecht	400	566	602	403	423		314	693	343	488	458	423				463	439		364	327	6,706	447	693	314
MVV	3,394	3,372	3,331			3,494	3,601	3,919	3,207	3,512		3,343	3,104			3,461	5,812	3,403	3,210		50,163	3,583	5,812	3,104
NAC Breda	15,824	16,434	17,823	16,889		17,156	18,165	17,312	16,968	18,212	16,328		16,786	17,521		18,427	14,792		16,727		255,364	17,024	18,427	14,792
NEC	8,024	8,235	9,192		6,713		7,356	7,960	7,673	9,080		6,589	7,159	6,822	8,325			6,734	6,723		106,585	7,613	9,192	6,589
Roda JC Kerkrade	6,480	6,227	5,455	4,459		8,247		5,453	5,408		4,039		4,150	8,547	10,387	6,048			5,049	4,977	84,926	6,066	10,387	4,039
Telstar	1,946	2,685			1,980	2,362	2,701			3,063	2,044	2,401	1,995	1,763	2,064	2,401	2,120		1,883	2,782	34,190	2,279	3,063	1,763
TOP Oss		1,709		1,012	1,189	1,028	1,803	2,500		2,541	1,211	1,753	1,085		2,514		1,478	1,239		1,411	22,473	1,605	2,541	1,012
Volendam		4,041	4,292	3,174			4,022	4,231	3,929	6,263	3,196	3,543	3,133	4,087	5,036	4,145	3,380	3,978			60,450	4,030	6,263	3,133
Total	72,777	64,443	64,607	56,038	40,939	68,140	66,526	65,323	58,444	78,742	63,178	56,146	70,936	76,321	53,774	65,285	66,116	40,050	55,491	46,895	1,230,171			
Average	4,852	4,296	4,615	3,736	2,924	4,867	4,752	4,355	4,175	5,249	4,513	3,743	5,067	5,088	3,841	4,352	4,408	2,861	3,699	3,350		4,242		
Maximum	15,824	16,434	17,823	16,889	9,065	17,156	18,165	17,312	16,968	18,212	16,328	9,210	16,786	17,521	10,387	18,427	14,792	9,311	16,727	9,503			18,427	
Minimum	400	550	400	357	350	500	314	500	300	488	412	423	840	400	250	450	439	412	350	327				250

Source: nos.nl
