= List of Netherlands national football team managers =

There have been 38 different coaches who have taken the role as manager of the Netherlands national football team. The team's first coach was Cees van Hasselt, who took charge of their first match against Belgium in 1905. Bob Glendenning holds the record for the longest tenure as Netherlands coach, having served in the role for a total of 16 years over two spells: in 1923, and from 1925 to 1940. He also coached the Netherlands team the most times in history with 87 matches, 24 more than second-placed coach Louis van Gaal. Louis van Gaal has the most wins as coach with 40 wins.

== Managers ==
As of 12 August 2026

From	To	Manager	M	W	D	L	Competitions	Notes
30 April 1905	10 May 1908	(Netherlands) Cees van Hasselt	11	6	0	5		
22 November 1908	15 November 1913	(England) Edgar Chadwick	24	14	2	8	1908 Olympics 1912 Olympics	
16 November 1910	Unknown	(England) Jimmy Hogan	1	1	0	0		Caretaker manager
17 November 1912	Unknown	(England) Fred Warburton	1	1	0	0		Caretaker manager
20 April 1913	Unknown	(England) Tom Bradshaw	1	0	0	1		Caretaker manager
15 March 1914	17 May 1914	(Scotland) Billy Hunter	4	2	1	1		
9 June 1919	Unknown	(England) Jack Reynolds	1	1	0	0		
24 August 1919	10 May 1923	(England) Frederick Warburton	21 (20)	8 (7)	6 (6)	7 (7)	1920 Olympics	
12 June 1921	Unknown	(England) Jim Waites	1	0	1	0		Caretaker manager
25 October 1923	Unknown	(England) Bob Glendenning	1	1	0	0		
23 March 1924	9 June 1924	(England) William Townley	8	2	3	3	1924 Olympics	
2 November 1924	Unknown	(England) Jan Bollington	1	1	0	0		
15 March 1925	21 April 1940	(England) Bob Glendenning	87 (86)	36 (35)	15 (15)	36 (36)	1928 Olympics 1934 FIFA World Cup 1938 FIFA World Cup	
10 March 1946	27 November 1946	(Netherlands) Karel Kaufman	4	2	1	1		
7 April 1947	30 June 1948	(England) Jesse Carver	10	6	2	2	1948 Olympics	
21 November 1948	Unknown	(Scotland) Tom Sneddon	1	0	1	0		
13 March 1949	23 April 1949	(Netherlands) Karel Kaufman	6 (2)	3 (1)	2 (1)	1 (0)		
12 June 1949	30 May 1954	(Netherlands) Jaap van der Leck	29	5	3	21	1952 Olympics	
24 October 1954	Unknown	(Netherlands) Karel Kaufman	7 (1)	3 (0)	2 (0)	2 (1)		
13 March 1955	Unknown	(Austria) Friedrich Donenfeld	1	0	1	0		
3 April 1955	6 June 1956	(Austria) Max Merkel	10	7	1	2		
15 September 1956	Unknown	(Austria) Heinrich "Wudi" Müller	1	1	0	0		
14 October 1956	4 November 1956	(Austria) Friedrich Donenfeld	3 (2)	1 (1)	2 (1)	0 (0)		
30 January 1957	26 May 1957	(England) George Hardwick	5	1	1	3		
11 September 1957	24 May 1964	(Romania) Elek Schwartz	49	19	12	18		
30 September 1964	14 November 1965	(England) Denis Neville	8	2	3	3		
23 March 1966	28 January 1970	(West Germany) Georg Keßler	28	10	6	12		
11 October 1970	18 November 1973	(Czechoslovakia) František Fadrhonc	20	13	4	3		
27 March 1974	7 July 1974	(Netherlands) Rinus Michels	10	6	3	1	1974 FIFA World Cup	
4 September 1974	19 June 1976	(Netherlands) George Knobel	15	9	1	5	UEFA Euro 1976	
8 September 1976	26 March 1977	(Netherlands) Jan Zwartkruis	4	3	1	0		
31 August 1977	24 June 1978	(Austria) Ernst Happel	12	8	2	2	1978 FIFA World Cup	
5 October 1977	26 October 1977	(Netherlands) Jan Zwartkruis	11 (2)	7 (1)	4 (1)	0 (0)		Caretaker manager
20 September 1978	6 January 1981	(Netherlands) Jan Zwartkruis	28 (22)	12 (8)	8 (6)	8 (8)	UEFA Euro 1980	
22 February 1981	22 February 1981	(Netherlands) Rob Baan	1	1	0	0		Caretaker manager
23 March 1981	17 October 1984	(Netherlands) Kees Rijvers	21	10	3	8		
29 April 1981	29 April 1981	(Netherlands) Rob Baan	2 (1)	2 (1)	0 (0)	0 (0)		Caretaker manager
14 November 1984	23 December 1984	(Netherlands) Rinus Michels	12 (2)	7 (1)	3 (0)	2 (1)		
27 February 1985	12 March 1986	(Netherlands) Leo Beenhakker	7	5	1	1		
29 April 1986	25 June 1988	(Netherlands) Rinus Michels	34 (22)	19 (12)	9 (6)	6 (4)	UEFA Euro 1988	
14 September 1988	20 December 1989	(Netherlands) Thijs Libregts	11	6	3	2		
21 February 1990	28 March 1990	(Netherlands) Nol de Ruiter	2	0	1	1		Caretaker manager
30 May 1990	24 June 1990	(Netherlands) Leo Beenhakker	13 (6)	6 (1)	4 (3)	3 (2)	1990 FIFA World Cup	
26 September 1990	22 June 1992	(Netherlands) Rinus Michels	53 (19)	30 (11)	14 (5)	9 (3)	UEFA Euro 1992	
9 September 1992	14 December 1994	(Netherlands) Dick Advocaat	26	15	6	5	1994 FIFA World Cup	
18 January 1995	11 July 1998	(Netherlands) Guus Hiddink	38	22	8	8	UEFA Euro 1996 1998 FIFA World Cup	
26 February 1997	26 February 1997	(Netherlands) Jan Rab	1	0	0	1		Caretaker manager
10 November 1998	29 June 2000	(Netherlands) Frank Rijkaard	22	8	12	2	UEFA Euro 2000	
2 September 2000	30 November 2001	(Netherlands) Louis van Gaal	14	8	4	2		
13 February 2002	30 June 2004	(Netherlands) Dick Advocaat	55 (29)	31 (16)	13 (7)	11 (6)	UEFA Euro 2004	
18 August 2004	21 June 2008	(Netherlands) Marco van Basten	52	35	11	6	2006 FIFA World Cup UEFA Euro 2008	
20 August 2008	17 June 2012	(Netherlands) Bert van Marwijk	52	34	10	8	2010 FIFA World Cup UEFA Euro 2012	
15 August 2012	31 July 2014	(Netherlands) Louis van Gaal	43 (29)	26 (18)	13 (9)	4 (2)	2014 FIFA World Cup	
1 August 2014	1 July 2015	(Netherlands) Guus Hiddink	48 (10)	26 (4)	9 (1)	13 (5)		
1 July 2015	27 March 2017	(Netherlands) Danny Blind	17	7	3	7		
27 March 2017	4 June 2017	(Netherlands) Fred Grim	3	2	0	1		Caretaker manager
4 June 2017	14 November 2017	(Netherlands) Dick Advocaat	62 (7)	37 (6)	13 (0)	12 (1)		
6 February 2018	19 August 2020	(Netherlands) Ronald Koeman	20	11	5	4	2019 UEFA Nations League Finals	
19 August 2020	23 September 2020	(Netherlands) Dwight Lodeweges	2	1	0	1		Caretaker manager
23 September 2020	29 June 2021	(Netherlands) Frank de Boer	15	8	4	3	UEFA Euro 2020	
4 August 2021	9 December 2022	(Netherlands) Louis van Gaal	63 (20)	40 (14)	19 (6)	4 (0)	2022 FIFA World Cup	
1 January 2023	30 June 2026	(Netherlands) Ronald Koeman	64 (44)	35 (24)	16 (11)	13 (9)	UEFA Euro 2024 2026 FIFA World Cup	
12 August 2026		(Spain) Xavi Hernández	0	0	0	0		
