= Amsterdamsche FC =

Dutch association football club from Amsterdam

AFC
- Full name: Amsterdamsche Football Club
- Short name: AFC
- Founded: 18 January 1895; 131 years ago
- Ground: Goed Genoeg, Amsterdam
- Capacity: 8,000
- Chairman: Brian Speelman
- Manager: Chedric Seedorf
- League: Tweede Divisie
- 2025–26: Tweede Divisie, 3rd of 18
- Website: www.afc.nl
Home colours	Away colours

Amsterdamsche Football Club, commonly known as AFC is a football club based in Amsterdam. The team compete in the Tweede Divisie, the third level of the Dutch football league system.

== History ==
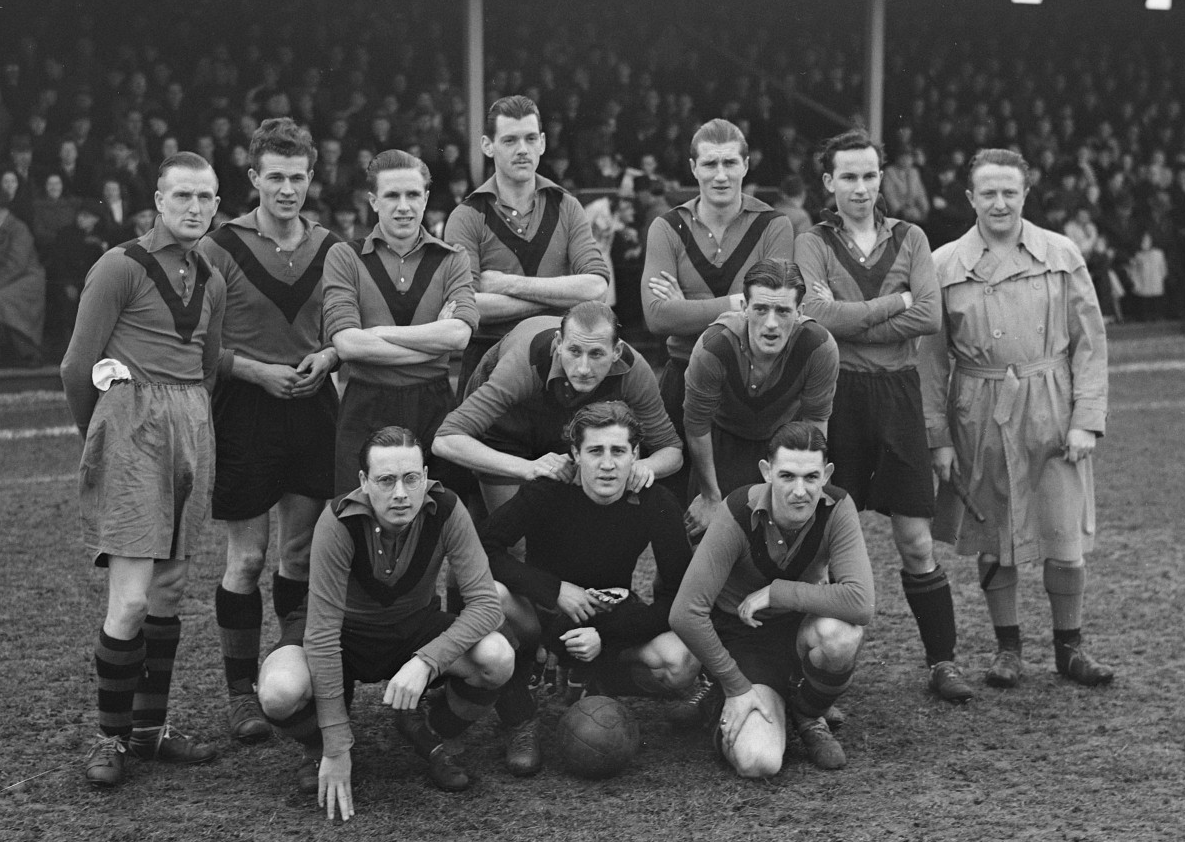
The first squad of Amsterdamsche FC, 1949

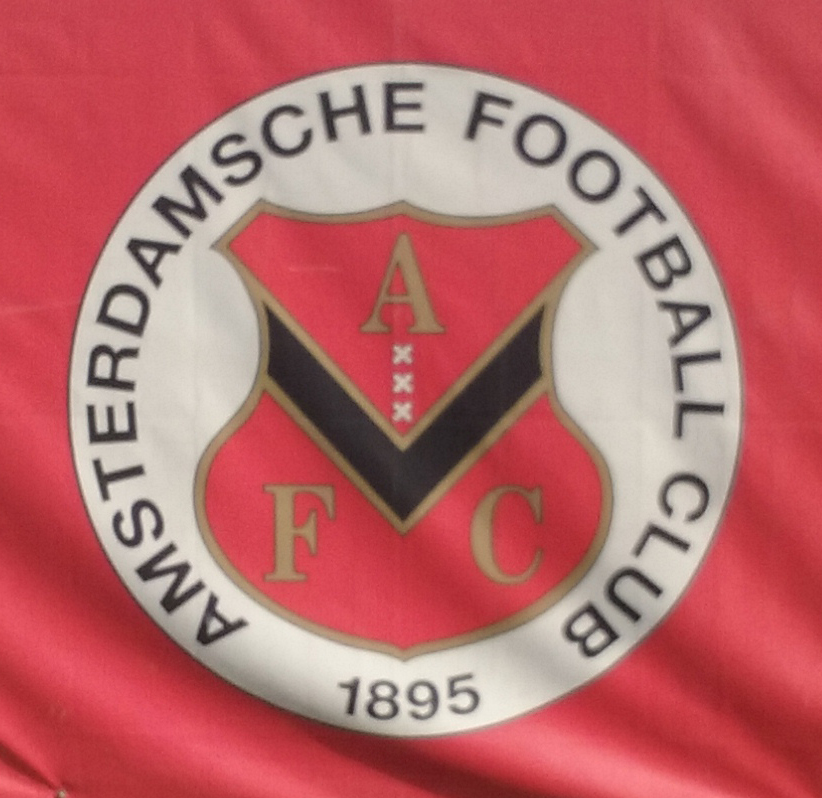
Amsterdamsche FC flag

=== 19th century: Foundation ===
AFC was founded in 1895 when a group of young Amsterdammers decided to create a football club. On 18 January 1895 the founding meeting took place in the basement of a house on the Koninginneweg where after a long discussion the name "Amsterdamsche Football Club (AFC)" was chosen. The meeting was held by six boys aged fifteen and sixteen. Four of them being Gerard Scheepens, Hein Brass, Frits Bernard and G.J. Bernard. These six boys were the progenitors of AFC.

=== 20th century: Championships galore ===
AFC-1 were crowned champions 14 times; 1906, 1909, 1917, 1918, 1919, 1946, 1961, 1963, 1967, 1969, 2001, 2010, 2014 and 2019, while also having been relegated three times; 1921, 1922 and 1998. In 2010 it was the first club in the Netherlands to enter the newly formed 'Top Class'. Despite only having 15 members when founded, by the time of the club's 50th anniversary (1945) it had over 700. By AFC's 100-year existence (1995) it has more than 1,500 members and in summer 2016 the club, including non-playing donors, over 2,100 members. Due to the shortage of fields and accommodation, unfortunately, hundreds of aspiring members must be disappointed every season when they apply for membership.

=== 21st century: Tweede Divisie and Eerste Klasse ===
In 2016 the first male squad lost 3–1 against Ajax U15.

== Current squad ==
As of 24 October 2026

Note: Flags indicate national team as defined under FIFA eligibility rules; some limited exceptions apply. Players may hold more than one non-FIFA nationality.

No.	Pos.	Nation	Player
1	GK	NED	Gijs van Zetten
2	DF	NED	Bruce Lücke
3	DF	NED	Gévero Markiet
4	DF	NED	Sven Ederveen
5	DF	NED	Cody Claver
6	MF	NED	Julian van der Greft
7	FW	NED	Tyro Nimmermeer
8	MF	NED	Noa Benninga
9	FW	NED	Floris van der Linden
11	FW	NED	Radjenio Fonseca
13	MF	NED	Ties Hovenkamp
14	MF	NED	Milan Klopper
15	DF	NED	Guus van Weerdenburg

No.	Pos.	Nation	Player
16	MF	NED	Splinter de Mooij
17	MF	NED	Rayan Aharchaoui
18	MF	NED	Anwar Bensabouh
20	MF	NED	Mircle Elstak
21	GK	NED	Daniël Nolet
23	FW	NED	Joyce Nsingi
24	DF	NED	Indy Lee
25	DF	NED	Dani Brussee
27	FW	NED	Delano Gouda
28	MF	NED	Gyvani de Jager
39	FW	ARU	Jayden Kruydenhof
48	MF	SUR	Chesron Oostwoud
55	DF	NED	Timo Letschert (captain)

== Associated people ==
=== Head coaches – 20th century ===
	AFC 1	Years		
*	(England) Fred Warburton	1910	-	1911
*	(England) William Reynolds	1911	-	1913
*	(Netherlands) H. G. du Puis and (Netherlands) J. van de Panne	1913	-	1914
*	?	1914	-	1917
*	(England) Edwin Dutton	1917	-	1918
*	?	1918	-	1922
*	(England) Jack Burton	1922		
*	(Germany) Josef Angermair	1923	-	1924
*	G. Bosch and Arie Metz	1924	-	1925
*	?	1925	-	1926
*	Triens	1926	-	1927
*	(England) Jack Reynolds	1927	-	1928
*	(Netherlands) Jo Broeksmit	1928	-	1929
*	(Belgium) Charles Aerts	1929	-	1930
*	(England) Tom Bromilow	1930	-	1932
*	(England) Peter Donaghy	1932	-	1933
*	F. Meier and Richelman	1933	-	1934
*	(Netherlands) Dolf van Kol	1934	-	1935
*	(Netherlands) Charles Lungen	1935	-	1936
*	(Netherlands) Gerrits and Hazeweyer	1936	-	1937
*	(Netherlands) Charles Lungen	1937	-	1938
*	(Republic of Ireland) James Donnelly	1938	-	1940
*	(Netherlands) Jo Broeksmit	1940	-	1941
*	(Netherlands) Karel Kaufman	1941	-	1942
*	(Netherlands) Piet Huisken	1942	-	1944
*	(Republic of Ireland) James Donnelly	1944	-	1945
*	(Netherlands) Jo Broeksmit	1945	-	1946
*	(Netherlands) Piet Huisken and (Scotland) Peter Dougall	1946	-	1947
*	(Netherlands) Cor Sluijk	1947	-	1949
*	(Netherlands) Cor Steeman	1949	-	1951
*	(Netherlands) Cor Sluijk	1951	-	1955
*	(Netherlands) Wim Vaal	1955	-	1956
*	(Netherlands) Chris Geluk and (Netherlands) Dick Disselkoen	1956	-	1958
*	(Netherlands) Van Dam	1958	-	1960
*	(Netherlands) Gé van Dijk	1961	-	1965
*	(Netherlands) Rinus Michels	1965		
*	(Netherlands) Gé van Dijk	1965	-	1970
*	(Netherlands) Wim Hoeben	1970		
*	(Netherlands) Piet Ouderland	1970	-	1976
*	(Netherlands) Gé van Dijk	1976	-	1978
*	(Netherlands) Frans Kramer	1978	-	1980
*	(Netherlands) Doby Peters	1980	-	1988
*	(Netherlands) Hans Vlietman	1988		
*	(Netherlands) Henny Kottmann	1988	-	1989
*	(Netherlands) Pim van de Meent	1989	-	1991
*	(Netherlands) Henny Schipper	1991	-	1993
*	(Netherlands) Pim van de Meent	1993	-	1994
*	(Netherlands) Henny Kottmann	1994	-	1997
*	(Netherlands) Karel Bouwens	1997		
*	(Netherlands) Pim van de Meent	1997	-	1998
*	(Netherlands) Rob Bianchi	1998	-	2000

=== Head coaches – 21st century ===
	AFC 1	Years		
*	(Netherlands) Pim van de Meent	2000		
*	(Netherlands) Ton du Chatinier	2000	-	2003
*	(Netherlands) Stanley Menzo	2003	-	2005
*	(Netherlands) John Kila	2005	-	2006
*	(Netherlands) Pim van de Meent	2006		
*	(Netherlands) Ton du Chatinier	2006	-	2008
*	(Netherlands) Cor ten Bosch	2008	-	2013
*	(Netherlands) Maarten Stekelenburg	2013		
*	(Netherlands) Willem Leushuis	2013	-	2015
*	(Netherlands) Stanley Menzo	2015		
*	(Netherlands) Bart Logchies	2015	-	2016
*	(Netherlands) Ton du Chatinier	2016	-	2017
*	(Netherlands) André Wetzel	2017	-	2018
*	(Netherlands) Ulrich Landvreugd	2018	-	2022

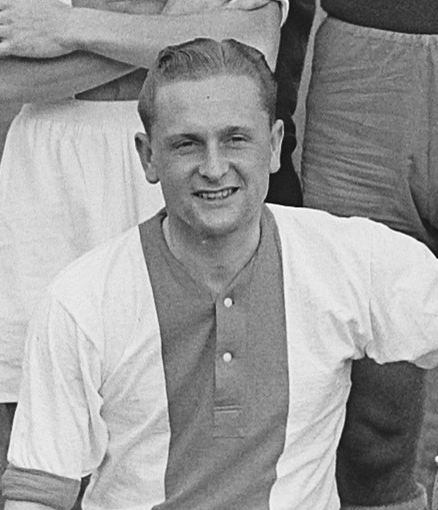
Gé van Dijk (1961–1965 and 1965–1970) has served longest as coach of the first squad

=== Notable players ===
- Daley Blind
- Brian Brobbey
- Carel Eiting
- Donald Feldmann
- Wim Feldmann
- Maxim Gullit
- Edwin Gyasi
- Ridgeciano Haps
- Mickey van der Hart
- Thom Haye
- Raily Ignacio
- Florian Jozefzoon
- Justin Kluivert
- Thomas Lam
- Derrick Luckassen
- Daryl van Mieghem
- Marcel Peeper
- Kenneth Pérez
- Immanuel Pherai
- Daniël de Ridder
- Philippe Sandler
