= 2021–22 SC Cambuur season =

Dutch football club season

SC Cambuur
2021–22 season
- Manager: Henk de Jong
- Stadium: Cambuur Stadion
- Eredivisie: 9th
- KNVB Cup: 2nd round
- Top goalscorer: League: Roberts Uldrikis (9 goals); All: Roberts Uldrikis (9 goals)
- Biggest win: 5-0 AFC Ajax (amateurs) (a) KNVB Cup 1st round
- Biggest defeat: 9-0 AFC Ajax (a) 5th week
- All statistics correct as of 17 December 2025.

The 2021–22 season was SC Cambuur's 8th season in the Eredivisie (1st consecutive). SC Cambuur finished the regular season in 9th place.

The club also competed in the KNVB Cup, where they were eliminated in the second round following a 2–1 defeat to NEC Nijmegen.

Roberts Uldrikis was the top scorer of the club in this season with 7 goals in Eredivisie.

Calvin Mac-Intosch was the most appeared player in this season with 34 appearances; 32 appearances in the Eredivisie and 2 appearances in the KNVB Cup.

== Players ==
=== First-team squad ===
As of 11 January 2022

Note: Flags indicate national team as defined under FIFA eligibility rules; some limited exceptions apply. Players may hold more than one non-FIFA nationality.

No.	Pos.	Nation	Player
1	GK	NED	Sonny Stevens (vice-captain)
2	DF	NED	Jasper ter Heide
3	DF	SUR	Calvin Mac-Intosch
4	DF	NED	Erik Schouten (captain)
5	DF	NED	Doke Schmidt
6	MF	NED	Mees Hoedemakers
7	FW	SLE	Issa Kallon
8	MF	NED	Jamie Jacobs
9	FW	NED	Tom Boere
10	MF	NED	Mitchel Paulissen
11	FW	NED	Patrick Joosten
12	GK	NED	Pieter Bos
14	MF	NED	Michael Breij
15	DF	NED	Marco Tol

No.	Pos.	Nation	Player
16	DF	SLE	Alex Bangura
17	MF	NED	Nick Doodeman
19	FW	NED	Sam Hendriks
20	MF	FRA	Robin Maulun
21	FW	HUN	Tamás Kiss
23	DF	NED	Maxim Gullit
24	FW	GAB	David Sambissa
27	DF	GBS	Sekou Sylla
28	FW	LAT	Roberts Uldriķis
30	MF	BUL	Filip Krastev
34	DF	NED	Thomas Rier
33	DF	HAI	Jhondly van der Meer
49	FW	NED	Milan Smit

== Transfers ==
=== In ===
Pos.	Player	Transferred from	Fee	Date
DF	(Netherlands) Marco Tol	(Netherlands) FC Volendam	Free	1 July 2021
FW	(Netherlands) Sam Hendriks	(Netherlands) Go Ahead Eagles	Free	1 July 2021
FW	(Netherlands) Tom Boere	(Germany) SV Meppen	Free	1 July 2021
MF	(Hungary) Tamás Kiss	(Hungary) Puskás Akadémia FC	On loan	16 August 2021
MF	(Bulgaria) Filip Krastev	(Belgium) Lommel S.K.	On loan	27 August 2021
DF	(Netherlands) Maxim Gullit	(Netherlands) AZ Alkmaar		27 August 2021
FW	(Latvia) Roberts Uldrikis	(Switzerland) FC Sion		31 August 2021
DF	(Guinea-Bissau) Sekou Sylla	(Netherlands) TOP Oss	Free	7 January 2022
FW	(Netherlands) Patrick Joosten	(Netherlands) FC Groningen	On loan	11 January 2022

=== Out ===
Pos.	Player	Transferred to	Fee	Date
DF	(Netherlands) Joris Kramer	(Netherlands) AZ Alkmaar	End of loan	30 June 2021
FW	(Netherlands) Robert Mühren	(Belgium) SV Zulte Waregem	End of loan	30 June 2021
FW	(Netherlands) Delano Ladan	No club		1 July 2021
FW	(Netherlands) Giovanni Korte	(Netherlands) De Graafschap	Free	1 July 2021
FW	(Netherlands) Maarten Pouwels	(Netherlands) Almere City FC	Free	1 July 2021
MF	(Netherlands) Mees Gootjes	(Netherlands) TOP Oss	Free	22 July 2021
DF	(Netherlands) Sven Nieuwpoort	(Netherlands) Excelsior Rotterdam	Free	27 July 2021
FW	(Curaçao) Jarchinio Antonia	(Netherlands) NAC Breda	Free	30 August 2021
GK	(Netherlands) Pieter Bos		End of career	18 May 2022

== Pre-season and friendlies ==
Win Draw Loss

10 July 2021 Friendly	SC Cambuur (Netherlands)	6–0	(Netherlands) Telstar	Netherlands
19:00

17 July 2021 Friendly	RWD Molenbeek (Belgium)	0–1	(Netherlands) SC Cambuur	Belgium
13:00

24 July 2021 Friendly	PEC Zwolle (Netherlands)	2–1	(Netherlands) SC Cambuur	Germany
14:30

7 August 2021 Friendly	Waasland-Beveren (Belgium)	2–2	(Netherlands) SC Cambuur	Belgium
14:30

27 January 2022 Friendly	SC Cambuur (Netherlands)	0–1	(Netherlands) Heracles Almelo	Netherlands
13:00

== Competitions ==
=== Overall record ===
Competition	First match	Last match	Starting round	Final position	Record							
Competition	First match	Last match	Starting round	Final position	Pld	W	D	L	GF	GA	GD	Win %
Eredivisie	15 August 2021	15 May 2021	Matchday 1	9th	34	11	6	17	53	70	−17	32.35
KNVB Cup	28 October 2021	16 December 2021	First round	Second round	2	1	0	1	6	2	+4	50.00
Total					36	12	6	18	59	72	−13	33.33

Source: Soccerway

=== Eredivisie ===
==== League table ====
Pos	Team	Pld	W	D	L	GF	GA	GD	Pts	Qualification or relegation
7	Utrecht	34	12	11	11	51	46	+5	47	Qualification for the European competition play-offs
8	Heerenveen	34	11	8	15	37	50	−13	41	Qualification for the European competition play-offs
9	Cambuur	34	11	6	17	53	70	−17	39	
10	RKC Waalwijk	34	9	11	14	40	51	−11	38	
11	NEC	34	10	8	16	38	52	−14	38	

Source: Eredivisie
Rules for classification: Season in progress: 1) Most points won; 2) Less points lost; 3) Goal difference; 4) Goals scored; 5) Alphabetical order; End of season: 1) Points; 2) Goal difference; 3) Goals scored; 4) Head-to-head points; 5) Head-to-head goal difference; 6) Head-to-head away goals scored; 7) Play-off if relevant for deciding champion, relegation or participating in a European league, otherwise by draw. 8) Penalty shoot-out (only after a play-off)

==== Results summary ====
Overall								Home						Away					
Pld	W	D	L	GF	GA	GD	Pts	W	D	L	GF	GA	GD	W	D	L	GF	GA	GD
34	11	6	17	53	70	−17	39	5	3	9	29	35	−6	6	3	8	24	35	−11

Source: Eredivisie

==== Results by round ====
Round	1	2	3	4	5	6	7	8	9	10	11	12	13	14	15	16	17	18	19	20	21	22	23	24	25	26	27	28	29	30	31	32	33	34
Ground	H	A	H	H	A	H	A	H	A	H	A	A	H	A	H	A	H	A	H	A	A	H	A	H	A	H	A	H	A	H	A	H	H	A
Result	L	L	W	W	L	W	W	L	L	L	W	W	W	W	L	W	L	D	D	D	L	L	L	W	L	L	L	L	L	L	D	D	D	W
Position	12	18	8	8	12	7	8	12	12	11	11	9	7	5	7	7	8	8	8	8	8	9	9	8	8	9	9	11	12	13	13	12	12	9

Source: 2021-22 Eredivisie Stand
A = Away; H = Home; W = Win; D = Draw; L = Loss

=== Matches ===
The league fixtures were announced on 11 June 2021.

==== 1st half ====
15 August 2021 1st week	SC Cambuur	1–2	FC Groningen	Leeuwarden
12:15	Robin Maulun 68'	Report	Ahmed El Messaoudi 33'; Jørgen Strand Larsen 90+3'	Attendance: 7,000; Referee: Allard Lindhout

21 August 2021 2nd week	PSV Eindhoven	4–1	SC Cambuur	Eindhoven
20:00	Davy Pröpper 18'; Eran Zahavi 21'; Noni Madueke 48'; Olivier Boscagli 90+4'	Report	Calvin Mac-Intosh (yellow card) 32'; Alex Bangura 66'	Stadium: Philips Stadion; Attendance: 23,500; Referee: Martin van der Kerkhof

28 August 2021 3rd week	SC Cambuur	2–0	FC Twente	Leeuwarden
18:45	Jamie Jacobs 66' 90+1'	Report		Stadium: Cambuur Stadion; Attendance: 6,672; Referee: Kevin Blom

11 September 2021 4th week	SC Cambuur	5–2	Go Ahead Eagles	Leeuwarden
18:45	Tom Boere 45' 50'; Marco Tol 53'; Jamie Jacobs 56'; Tamás Kiss 75'	Report	Luuk Brouwers 36'; Iñigo Córdoba 78'	Stadium: Cambuur Stadion; Attendance: 6,682

18 September 2021 5th week	AFC Ajax	9–0	SC Cambuur	Amsterdam
20:00	Jurriën Timber 16'; Steven Berghuis 19'; Noussair Mazraoui 29'; David Neres 38' 84'; Dušan Tadić 60'; Mohamed Daramy 64'; Sébastien Haller 67'; Danilo 76'	Report		Stadium: Johan Cruyff Arena; Attendance: 36,711; Referee: Sander van der Eijk

23 September 2021 6th week	SC Cambuur	2–1	Heracles Almelo	Leeuwarden
18:45	Michael Breij 25'; Mees Hoedemakers 47'	Report	Sinan Bakış 90'	Stadium: Cambuur Stadion; Attendance: 6,676

26 September 2021 7th week	Sparta Rotterdam	0–4	SC Cambuur	Rotterdam
12:15		Report	Alex Bangura 36'; Issa Kallon 63' 74'; Tom Boere 90+4'	Stadium: Het Kasteel; Attendance: 8,645

3 October 2021 8th week	SC Cambuur	1–3	AZ Alkmaar	Leeuwarden
14:30	Roberts Uldrikis 72'	Report	Dani de Wit 16'; Owen Wijndal 33'; Jordy Clasie 60'	Stadium: Cambuur Stadion; Attendance: 10,000; Referee: Jochem Kamphuis

16 October 2021 9th week	Fortuna Sittard	1–0	SC Cambuur	Sittard
21:00	George Cox 86'	Report		Stadium: Fortuna Sittard Stadion; Attendance: 6,873

24 October 2021 10th week	SC Cambuur	2–3	Feyenoord	Leeuwarden
14:30	David Sambissa 23' 50'	Report	Bryan Linssen 25'; Fredrik Aursnes 45'; Tyrell Malacia 58'	Stadium: Cambuur Stadion; Attendance: 10,000

31 October 2021 11th week	RKC Waalwijk	0–1	SC Cambuur	Waalwijk
16:45		Report	Issa Kallon 63'	Stadium: Mandemakers Stadion; Attendance: 4,754

6 November 2021 12th week	PEC Zwolle	1–2	SC Cambuur	Zwolle
21:00	Dean Huiberts 79'	Report	Mees Hoedemakers 23'; Robin Maulun 48'	Stadium: MAC³PARK Stadion; Attendance: 13,098

21 November 2021 13th week	SC Cambuur	2–1	FC Utrecht	Leeuwarden
20:00	Roberts Uldriķis 21'; Jacobs 54'	Report	Moussa Sylla 32'; Django Warmerdam (yellow card) 47'; Mark van der Maarel (yellow card) 90+3'	Stadium: Cambuur Stadion; Referee: Dennis Higler

26 November 2021 14th week	NEC Nijmegen	2–3	SC Cambuur	Nijmegen
20:00	Édgar Barreto 31'; Ali Akman 36'	Report	Jamie Jacobs 17'; Roberts Uldrikis 52'; Alex Bangura 66'	Stadium: Goffertstadion; Referee: Rob Dieperink

4 December 2021 15th week	SC Cambuur	1–6	SBV Vitesse	Leeuwarden
18:45	Marco Tol 41'	Report	Sondre Tronstad 26' 49'; Loïs Openda 30' 64'; Thomas Buitink 36'; Nikolai Baden Frederiksen 79'	Stadium: Cambuur Stadion

10 December 2021 16th week	Willem II Tilburg	1–3	SC Cambuur	Tilburg
20:00	Godfried Roemeratoe 90'	Report	Roberts Uldrikis 49'; Robin Maulun 68' (pen.); Mitchell Paulissen 90+4'	Stadium: Koning Willem II Stadion

19 December 2021 17th week	SC Cambuur	1–2	SC Heerenveen	Leeuwarden
12:15	Doke Schmidt (red card) 12'; Roberts Uldriķis 30'; Maxim Gullit (yellow card) 90+3'	Report	Henk Veerman 10' (pen.) 83'; Milan van Ewijk (yellow card) 21'	Stadium: Cambuur Stadion; Attendance: 0 Referee: Danny Makkelie

22 December 2021 18th week	Heracles Almelo	1–1	SC Cambuur	Almelo
20:00	Nikolai Laursen (yellow card) 60'; Orestis Kiomourtzoglou 77'; Marco Rente (yellow card) 90'	Report	Alex Bangura (yellow card) 28'; Michael Breij 59'	Stadium: Erve Asito; Attendance: 0 Referee: Allard Lindhout

==== 2nd half ====
16 January 2022 19th week	SC Cambuur	1–1	Sparta Rotterdam	Leeuwarden
14:30	Tim Coremans 33' (o.g.); Alex Bangura (yellow card) 81'	Report	Tom Beugelsdijk (yellow card) 65'; Adrián Dalmau 77'	Stadium: Cambuur Stadion; Attendance: 0 Referee: Dennis Higler

22 January 2022 20th week	AZ Alkmaar	0–0	SC Cambuur	Alkmaar
20:00		Report	Sekou Sylla (yellow card) 32'; Tamás Kiss (yellow card) 90'	Stadium: AFAS Stadion; Attendance: 0 Referee: Bas Nijhuis

5 February 2022 21st week	FC Utrecht	3–2	SC Cambuur	Utrecht
16:30	Anastasios Douvikas 33' 38'; Willem Janssen (yellow card) 43'; Mark van der Maarel (yellow card) 60'; Henk Veerman 64'	Report	Erik Schouten 8' 12'; Robin Maulun (yellow card) 21'; Roberts Uldriķis (yellow card) 43'	Stadium: Stadion Galgenwaard; Attendance: 8,000; Referee: Edwin van de Graaf

12 February 2022 22nd week	SC Cambuur	3–4	PEC Zwolle	Leeuwarden
18:45	Robin Maulun 9' (pen.); Kostas Lamprou 43' (o.g.); David Sambissa 78'	Report	Oussama Darfalou 3'; Mees de Wit 6'; Daishawn Redan 56'; Bram van Polen 66'	Stadium: Cambuur Stadion; Attendance: 3,300; Referee: Ingmar Oostrom

20 February 2022 23rd week	Feyenoord	3–1	SC Cambuur	Rotterdam
14:30	Luis Sinisterra 24'; Tyrell Malacia (yellow card) 37'; Orkun Kökçü 45'; Alireza Jahanbakhsh 49'; Fredrik Aursnes (yellow card) 57'	Report	Tom Boere 17'; Calvin Mac-Intosch (yellow card) 22'; Michael Breij (yellow card) 79'; Jamie Jacobs (yellow card) 89'	Stadium: De Kuip; Attendance: 44,779; Referee: Jochem Kamphuis

26 February 2022 24th week	SC Cambuur	2–1	Fortuna Sittard	Leeuwarden
21:00	Tom Boere 35' 74'	Report	Deroy Duarte 20'; Ben Rienstra (yellow card) 47'; Mickaël Tirpan (yellow card) 55'; Paul Gladon (yellow card) 90+1'	Stadium: Cambuur Stadion; Attendance: 9,780; Referee: Jannick van der Laan

6 March 2022 25th week	FC Twente	1–0	SC Cambuur	Enschede
14:30	Robin Pröpper 63'; Joshua Brenet (yellow card) 70'	Report	Jasper ter Heide (yellow card) 16'; Calvin Mac-Intosch (yellow card) 25'; Erik Schouten (yellow card) 57'; Mitchel Paulissen (yellow card) 88'; Marco Tol (yellow card) 90+5'	Stadium: De Grolsch Veste; Attendance: 26,800; Referee: Sander van der Eijk

11 March 2022 26th week	SC Cambuur	2–3	AFC Ajax	Leeuwarden
20:00	Tom Boere (yellow card) 19'; Issa Kallon 48'; Robin Maulun (yellow card) 59'; Patrick Joosten 79'	Report	Dušan Tadić 3'; Sébastien Haller 40' (yellow card) 71'; Ryan Gravenberch 90+2'	Stadium: Cambuur Stadion; Attendance: 9,822; Referee: Allard Lindhout

19 March 2022 27th week	Go Ahead Eagles	3–0	SC Cambuur	Deventer
18:45	Joris Kramer 25'; Pieter Bos 36' (o.g.); Mats Deijl (yellow card) 52' (goal) 77'	Report	Mees Hoedemakers (yellow card) 16'; Mitchel Paulissen (yellow card) 16'; Doke Schmidt (yellow card) 39'; Robin Maulun (yellow card) 63'; Alex Bangura (yellow card) 81'	Stadium: De Adelaarshorst; Attendance: 9,631; Referee: Serdar Gözübüyük

3 April 2022 28th week	SC Cambuur	1–2	NEC Nijmegen	Leeuwarden
16:45	Roberts Uldriķis (yellow card) 6'; Mitchel Paulissen 11'	Report	Jonathan Okita 2'; Ilias Bronkhorst (yellow card) 29'; Jordy Bruijn (yellow card) 58'; Javier Vet 78'	Stadium: Cambuur Stadion; Attendance: 10,000; Referee: Pol van Boekel

10 April 2022 29th week	SBV Vitesse	1–0	SC Cambuur	Arnhem
14:30	Loïs Openda 42'; Jacob Rasmussen (yellow card) 45+2'	Report	Issa Kallon (yellow card) 45+2'	Stadium: GelreDome; Attendance: 14,970; Referee: Edwin van de Graaf

23 April 2022 30th week	SC Cambuur	1–2	PSV Eindhoven	Leeuwarden
21:00	Patrick Joosten 2' (yellow card) 62'; Sekou Sylla (yellow card) 38' (yellow-red card) 60'; Mees Hoedemakers (yellow card) 69'	Report	Eran Zahavi 44'; Mario Götze 65'	Stadium: Cambuur Stadion; Attendance: 10,000; Referee: Dennis Higler

1 May 2022 31st week	SC Heerenveen	3–3	SC Cambuur	Heerenveen
12:15	Anas Tahiri 2'; Sydney van Hooijdonk 34'; Sven van Beek (yellow card) 38'; Lucas Woudenberg (yellow card) 73'; Joost van Aken 90+6'	Report	Roberts Uldriķis 12'; Robin Maulun 65' (pen.); Mitchel Paulissen (yellow card) 73' (goal) 90+4'	Stadium: Abe Lenstra Stadion; Attendance: 25,100; Referee: Bas Nijhuis

6 May 2022 32nd week	SC Cambuur	1–1	RKC Waalwijk	Leeuwarden
20:00	Mees Hoedemakers (yellow card) 76'; Milan Smit 90+5'	Report	Shawn Adewoye (yellow card) 24'; Doke Schmidt 72' (o.g.)	Stadium: Cambuur Stadion; Attendance: 10,000; Referee: Joey Kooij

11 May 2022 33rd week	SC Cambuur	1–1	Willem II Tilburg	Leeuwarden
20:00	Sekou Sylla 43'; Mitchel Paulissen (yellow card) 45+3'	Report	Jizz Hornkamp (yellow card) 45+3'; Derrick Köhn 55'; Mats Köhlert (yellow card) 63'; Dries Saddiki (yellow card) 82'	Stadium: Cambuur Stadion; Attendance: 10,000; Referee: Erwin Blank

15 May 2022 34th week	FC Groningen	2–3	SC Cambuur	Groningen
14:30	Tomáš Suslov (yellow card) 53'; Jørgen Strand Larsen 58'; Bjorn Meijer (yellow card) 59'; Romano Postema 90+2'	Report	Roberts Uldriķis 12'; Mees Hoedemakers 50' (yellow card) 74'; Issa Kallon (yellow card) 53' (goal) 61' (pen.); Jamie Jacobs (yellow card) 83'	Stadium: Euroborg; Attendance: 21,286; Referee: Rob Dieperink

=== KNVB Cup ===
28 October 2021 1st round	AFC Ajax (amateurs)	0–5	SC Cambuur	Amsterdam
18:45		Report	Xamm Flemming 22' (o.g.); Filip Krastev 35'; Erik Schouten 38'; Stefan Smal 57' (o.g.); Nick Doodeman 74'	Stadium: Sportpark De Toekomst; Attendance: 550

16 December 2021 2nd round	SC Cambuur	1–2	NEC Nijmegen	Leeuwarden
18:45	Sam Hendriks 57'; Alex Bangura (yellow card) 90'	Report	Ole Romeny 2'; Dirk Proper 41'; Ilias Bronkhorst (yellow card) 77'; Rodrigo Guth (yellow card) 84'; Javier Vet (yellow card) 90+1'	Stadium: Cambuur Stadion; Attendance: 0 Referee: Edwin van de Graaf

== Statistics ==
=== Scorers ===
#	Player	Eerste Divisie	KNVB	Total
1	(Latvia) Roberts Uldrikis	7	0	7
2	(Sierra Leone) Issa Kallon	5	0	5
2	(Netherlands) Jamie Jacobs	5	0	5
2	(France) Robin Maulun	5	0	5
2	(Netherlands) Tom Boere	5	0	5
6	(Sierra Leone) Alex Bangura	3	0	3
6	(Gabon) David Sambissa	3	0	3
6	(Netherlands) Erik Schouten	2	1	3
6	(Netherlands) Mees Hoedemakers	3	0	3
6	(Netherlands) Mitchell Paulissen	3	0	3
11	(Netherlands) Marco Tol	2	0	2
11	(Netherlands) Michael Breij	2	0	2
11	(Netherlands) Patrick Joosten	2	0	2
14	(Bulgaria) Filip Krastev	0	1	1
14	(Netherlands) Milan Smit	1	0	1
14	(Netherlands) Nick Doodeman	0	1	1
14	(Netherlands) Sam Hendriks	0	1	1
14	(Guinea-Bissau) Sekou Sylla	1	0	1
14	(Hungary) Tamás Kiss	1	0	1

=== Appearances ===
#	Player	Eerste Divisie	KNVB	Total
1	(Suriname) Calvin Mac-Intosch	32	2	34
2	(Sierra Leone) Issa Kallon	32	1	33
3	(Netherlands) Doke Schmidt	30	2	32
3	(Netherlands) Mitchell Paulissen	31	1	32
5	(Netherlands) Erik Schouten	29	2	31
5	(Netherlands) Jamie Jacobs	30	1	31
5	(France) Robin Maulun	31	0	31
5	(Netherlands) Sonny Stevens	29	2	31
9	(Netherlands) Mees Hoedemakers	28	1	29
10	(Sierra Leone) Alex Bangura	27	1	28
10	(Netherlands) Marco Tol	27	1	28
10	(Netherlands) Michael Breij	27	1	28
13	(Gabon) David Sambissa	22	1	23
13	(Netherlands) Tom Boere	22	1	23
15	(Latvia) Roberts Uldrikis	21	1	22
16	(Netherlands) Jasper ter Heide	16	2	18
17	(Netherlands) Nick Doodeman	15	2	17
18	(Netherlands) Patrick Joosten	15	0	15
19	(Hungary) Tamás Kiss	11	2	13
20	(Haiti) Jhondly van der Meer	10	2	12
21	(Netherlands) Maxim Gullit	7	2	9
22	(Netherlands) Sam Hendriks	5	2	7
23	(Netherlands) Pieter Bos	6	0	6
24	(Bulgaria) Filip Krastev	3	2	5
24	(Guinea-Bissau) Sekou Sylla	5	0	5
26	(Netherlands) Milan Smit	4	0	4
27	(Netherlands) Thomas Rier	1	0	1

=== Clean sheets ===
#	Player	Eerste Divisie	KNVB Cup	Total
1	(Netherlands) Sonny Stevens	4	1	5
2	(Netherlands) Pieter Bos	1	0	1
Total		5	1	6

=== Disciplinary record ===
#	Player	Eerste Divisie		KNVB		Total	
#	Player	Yellow card	Red card	Yellow card	Red card	Yellow card	Red card
1	(Sierra Leone) Alex Bangura	6	1	1	0	7	1
2	(Netherlands) Doke Schmidt	1	1	0	0	1	1
2	(Guinea-Bissau) Sekou Sylla	1	1	0	0	1	1
4	(Suriname) Calvin Mac-Intosch	5	0	0	0	5	0
4	(Netherlands) Mees Hoedemakers	5	0	0	0	5	0
4	(Netherlands) Mitchell Paulissen	5	0	0	0	5	0
4	(France) Robin Maulun	5	0	0	0	5	0
8	(Sierra Leone) Issa Kallon	4	0	0	0	4	0
8	(Netherlands) Jamie Jacobs	4	0	0	0	4	0
10	(Latvia) Roberts Uldrikis	3	0	0	0	3	0
11	(Netherlands) Erik Schouten	2	0	0	0	2	0
11	(Netherlands) Michael Breij	2	0	0	0	2	0
13	(Gabon) David Sambissa	1	0	0	0	1	0
13	(Netherlands) Jasper ter Heide	1	0	0	0	1	0
13	(Netherlands) Marco Tol	1	0	0	0	1	0
13	(Netherlands) Maxim Gullit	1	0	0	0	1	0
13	(Netherlands) Patrick Joosten	1	0	0	0	1	0
13	(Netherlands) Tom Boere	1	0	0	0	1	0
