= Pim van de Meent =

Dutch footballer and manager (1937–2002)

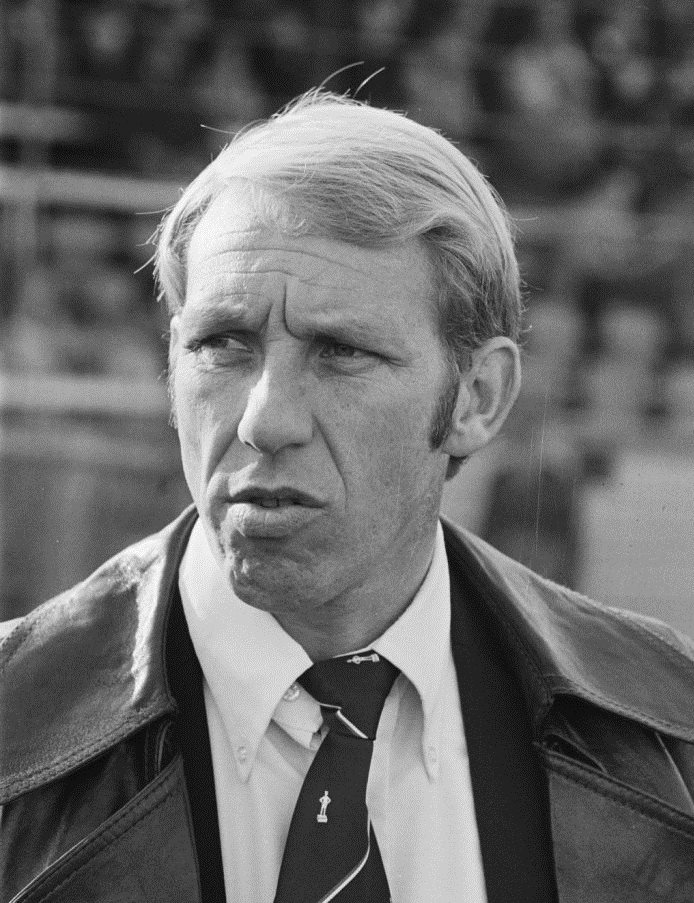
- Van de Meent in 1976

Personal information
- Date of birth: 20 November 1937
- Place of birth: Amsterdam, Netherlands
- Date of death: 13 October 2022 (aged 84)
- Position: Rightback

Youth career
- Westerkwartier

Senior career*
Years	Team	Apps	(Gls)
1958–1959	SHS	7	(0)
1961–1962	DOS	1	(0)
1962–1963	VUC		
1963–1965	N.E.C.	13	(0)

Managerial career
- 1965–1966: DWV
- 1966–1969: Huizen
- 1969–1970: PEC Zwolle
- 1970–1972: DWS
- 1972–1978: FC Amsterdam
- 1978–1980: De Graafschap
- 1981–1985: N.E.C.
- 1985–1986: MVV
- 1986–1988: FC Den Haag
- * Club domestic league appearances and goals

Pim van de Meent (20 November 1937 – 13 October 2022) was a Dutch football manager and player who played as a defender.

== Playing career ==
Van de Meent was born in Amsterdam, North Holland on 20 November 1937. He played for Holland Sport, DOS, VUC and NEC Nijmegen. He quit playing at 28 years of age.

== Managerial career ==
Van de Meent was better known for being a football coach, who worked for clubs like PEC Zwolle, NEC (1981–1985) and De Graafschap.

In 1965 he started managing, winning two amateur league titles with Huizen. He was the first manager of newly-formed FC Amsterdam, reaching 5th place in the 1973–74 Eredivisie season and losing to 1. FC Köln in the 1974–75 UEFA Cup quarter finals.

He reached the 1982-83 KNVB Cup final, with NEC (3–1 loss to Ajax), and the next season the club participated in the Cup Winners' Cup, teaming up against Diego Maradona's FC Barcelona after beating Norwegian side Brann Bergen in the first round. He was also relegated to the Eerste Divisie in 1983 and again got relegated with MVV in 1986.

Former FC Amsterdam chairman Dé Stoop lured him to his new club FC Den Haag and he also lost the 1986–87 KNVB Cup final with them, but qualified for and played in the 1987–88 European Cup Winners' Cup with Den Haag.

He later worked as caretaker manager, academy manager, technical director and facility manager at AFC.

== Personal life and death ==
Van de Meent died on 13 October 2022, at the age of 84. He was survived by his wife Netty and their three children.
