= Huub Bals =

Director and creator of International Film Festival Rotterdam

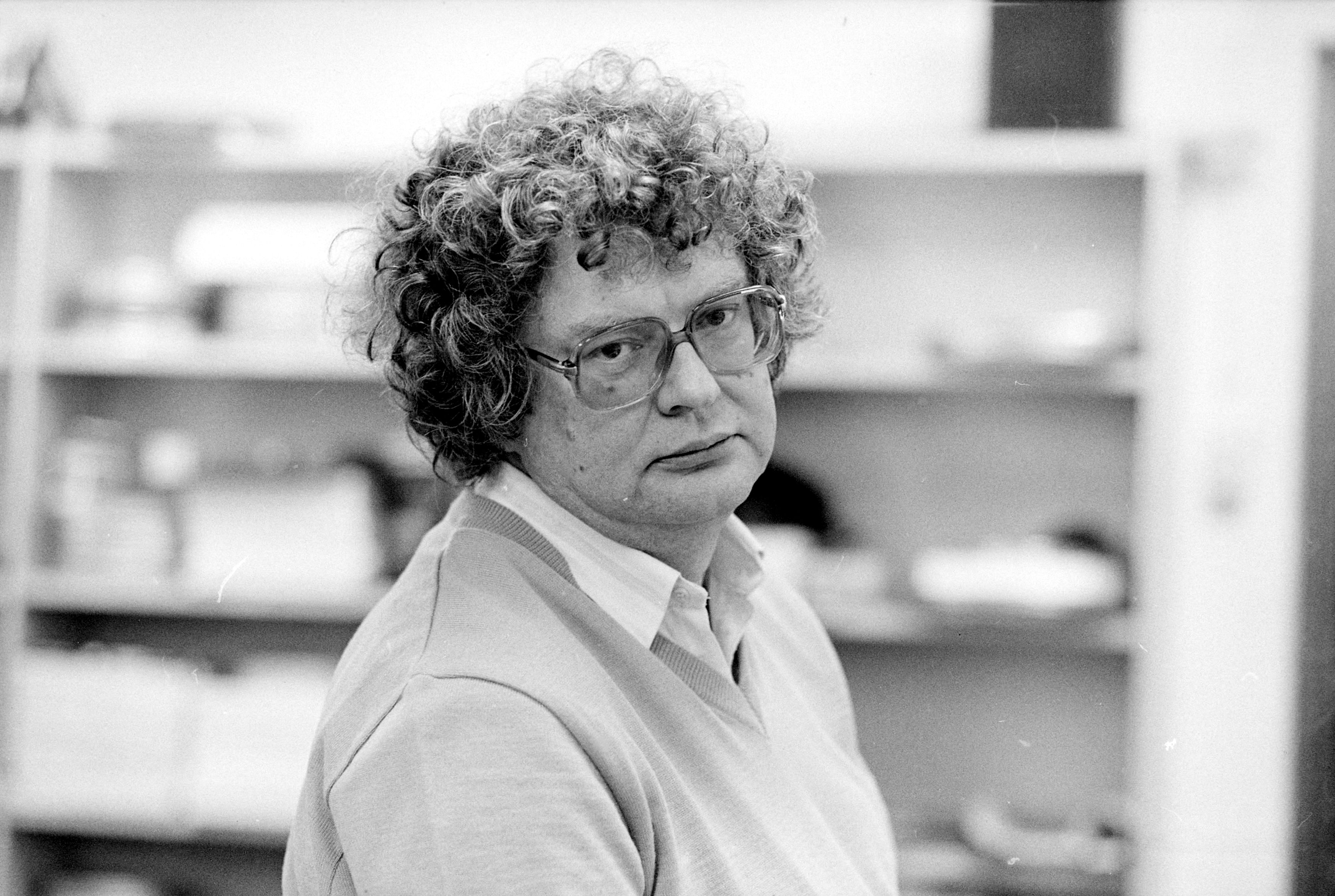
- Bals at Film Festival Rotterdam, 1983
- Born: February 3, 1937; Utrecht, The Netherlands
- Died: July 13, 1988 (aged 51); Utrecht, The Netherlands
- Occupations: First director of International Film Festival Rotterdam (1972–1988), organizer of the Cinemanifestatie in Utrecht (1966–1972)
- Known for: Film programming, cinephilia, personality

Hubertus Bernardus "Huub" Bals (February 3, 1937 – July 13, 1988) was the founding director of International Film Festival Rotterdam (IFFR). IFFR started small in the Calypso cinema and film theatre 't Venster (now LantarenVenster) in Rotterdam, The Netherlands, in 1972, with only 4500 visitors and 31 films. In the forthcoming years the film festival expanded gradually and developed into an annual film event of great international importance. Thanks to Bals, many new film countries and continents were introduced to The Netherlands, among which are Russia, China, Taiwan, Africa, and Latin-America.

== Early life ==
Huub Bals was born to Hubertus Bernardus Bals and Lamberta Snellenberg in Utrecht on February 3, 1937. His parents were simple, Catholic citizens from the traditional Wijk C in Utrecht, who traded in animal-waste products. Just before the Second World War, they moved to the working-class district Ondiep in the same city.

Organizing and programming was Bals like a glove. During his time at highschool, the Catholic Bonifatius Lyceum in Utrecht, he set up a small singing group - for which Bals wrote his own lyrics on well-known pop songs - and was the leader of the club Dragnet; a small group of friends that used to listen to music from the American Forces Network in Germany on the radio, play records and gamble. Furthermore, he contributed to Minjon, AVRO radio's programme for youth, and the school newspaper Stemmen. His fellow students describe him as 'a solitary, not particularly nice boy, who liked arranging and organizing things and preferred to be in charge.'

During his highschool years, Bals developed a particular love for jazz; he gave lectures on jazz at school and once travelled to Bonn for an interview with Gernot Haefeker, the chairman of a jazz-club, for the school paper. It was partly this predilection for jazz that eventually made Bals quit his high school education, which he never completed. He got a job in the publicity department of the Dutch Phonogram Record Company and worked as a jazz impresario; among other things, he organized jazz concerts and performances with international stars at several locations in the Netherlands.

In April 1957, Bals was called up for military service, which ended his music activities in Utrecht. However, even in the military, Bals could not let go of his passion for organizing; as a Welfare Officer he took care of the entertainment for the NCO's and organized all kinds of parties and film evenings. This is where his interest in film began to develop.

== Employment at Wolff ==
When Bals returned from his military service in January 1959, it only took him one month to find a new job. He got hired as assistant-manager at the cinema Camera/Studio of the Wolff Cinema Group, a combination of an arthouse cinema (Studio) and a public theatre (Camera). This position has been of great importance for the rest of Bals' career in the film world. Wolff allowed him the freedom to organize all kinds of events, as for example special filmweeks, like a Bergman film week and a Chaplin festival, in Studio. The first international film week in Studio in February 1963, organized on its seventh anniversary, is often seen as the source of the eventual International Film Festival of Rotterdam.

Bals had the reputation of always creating the right atmosphere in the cinema's, by means of big publicity stunts. When La belle americaine was being screened (1962) he had a large American car driven through the centre, at the premiere of Zorba the Creek visitors could learn to dance the sirtaki, and in the case of a ghost film he made sure the cinema hall was filled with a big spider's web. Films that flopped in the rest of The Netherlands could run for weeks in Studio.

'He had a perfect nose for attracting the right people to help him carry out his ideas (...) who made sure that the exteriors of the cinemas always looked different and always sparked the imagination.'

In 1966, Bals started to organize the Cinemanifestatie Utrecht for Wolff; an international film festival which introduced many new directors from diverse countries and new film movements like the Nouvelle Vague to the Netherlands and grew out to be an important biennial film event in the sixties. It was in these years that Bals developed his passion and personal taste for films:

‘I began to devour films, by the bucketload! No, no preferences, it was a long time before that happened. I didn’t yet fully understand films by people like Antonioni or Buñuel, but gradually I did begin to experience a certain feeling, something like ‘hey, put your brain on hold and just take it in.’ It wasn’t taught, the feeling, it was just out there.’

In the same year he married Marjolijn de Vries whom he met at the cinema they were both working at. After Huub was no longer involved in the organization of the Cinemanifestatie (1972) - he organized it four times - the event only lasted for three times:

'(...) Everyone is in agreement that Utrecht doesn't have 'it' anymore.'

Besides his work for Wolff, Bals also worked on another project, for which he bore full responsibility: on June 20, 1973, he opened the very first filmhouse 't Hoogt in Utrecht.

== Film International ==
the beginning of IFFR on YouTube

With the work he did for Wolff - the Cinemanifestatie, the Filmweeks, special screenings, etc. - Bals had gained a tremendous reputation as an organizer of festivals in The Netherlands.

'The International Film Guide (...) made mention of a new phenomenon in the international film world: "The energetic Hubert Bals".'

This motivated other institutions, among which the Filmweek Arhem on YouTube, to approach the passionate cinephile for the organization of all kinds of filmrelated events. One of them was Adriaan van Staay, managing director of the Rotterdam Arts Foundation, who wanted Bals to help improving the film climate in Rotterdam by means of a festival, analogous to the avant-garde Poetry International. Film International was born; a unique combination of a film festival ánd a distribution company, and a platform for the 'noconformist filmmaker'.

Although the opening of the first Film International in Calypso on Wednesday June 28, 1972, with the screening of The Postman by the Iranian director Dariush Mehrjui, only counted seventeen visitors, the festival turned out to be a major success, partly thanks to the publicity and programming skills of Bals. To promote the festival, he for example sent hostesses to Amsterdam, armed with a couple of thousand festival folders, with provocative texts such as Keep your trap shut in discussions about films if you haven't been to Film International. It worked; the first Film International attracted around 4500 visitors, screened forty films, and kept growing extensively in the forthcoming years. In the same year of the birth of International Film Festival Rotterdam, his son, Boris Bals, was born. Actually even during the festival, which was back then still in June, later on he moved it to February, because he could have scoops of films that later on would be shown in Berlin and Cannes.

Film International gave Bals the opportunity to introduce new directors and film countries to The Netherlands. He strongly believed that 'the American cinema was dying' and used the Rotterdam festival to show 'films about which we have the feeling that they cannot yet be shown in the normal cinema.' He travelled around the world and visited a wide range of filmfestivals, among which Venice, Cannes, Edinburgh, Berlin and Locarno, and cities such as Rio de Janeiro, New York City, Belgrade and Lisbon, where he watched around seven hundred films a year. He did everything to find the right, qualitative films for Film International. According to Bals, the masters of the cinema were to be found in the Third World, which made him introduce continents such as Asia, Africa and Latin-America, to the festival.

'As no other, Bals selected these films, without ever making compromises or deals.'

Besides films, Bals enriched the festival with, among other things, discussions, talks with the film makers - the 'Q&A's' of the current festival -, all kinds of parties, the Filmkrant and the currently well known international co-production market Cinemart, which he introduced in 1984.

1984 was also the year Bals got his first heart attack. However, he did not reduce his work or lessen his bad habits; as a real bon-vivant smoking, drinking and eating had become part of his life. The heart attack did have a big influence on his life and character: in the following years Bals became melancholic, pessimistic and exhausted.

'This festival really breaks me. (...) There is nothing that satisfies me anymore, except for grabbing a new film. And that keeps taking more and more energy. You have to travel so incredibly far to discover things, because there is no talent.'

On the evening of July 13, 1988, Bals suddenly died of a second heart attack. His plans for the Tarkovsky Fund, meant to help film makers - mainly from the Third World - to get their projects off the ground, were realized after his death with the Hubert Bals Fund. This fund for the support of film makers from Asia, the Middle East, Eastern Europe, Africa and Latin America still exists in the current film festival.

== Bibliography ==
- Heijs, Jan; Westra, Frans (1996). Que le tigre danse. Huub Bals a biography. Amsterdam: Otto Cramwinckel.
