= List of shipwrecks in March 1878 =

The list of shipwrecks in March 1878 includes ships sunk, foundered, grounded, or otherwise lost during March 1878.

== 1 March ==
List of shipwrecks: 1 March 1878
Ship	State	Description
Ann Beer	United Kingdom	The schooner ran aground on the Caloot Bank, in the North Sea off the coast of Zeeland, Netherlands. She was on a voyage from Antwerp, Belgium to South Shields, County Durham.
Elizabeth	Netherlands	The schooner was wrecked on the coast of Anglesey, United Kingdom with the loss of six of her seven crew. The survivor was rescued by the Penmon Lifeboat Thomas Lingham ( Royal National Lifeboat Institution). Elizabeth was on a voyage from Falmouth, Cornwall to Liverpool, Lancashire, United Kingdom.
Familiens Haab	Denmark	The galiot was driven ashore at Snogebæk, Bornholm. Her crew were rescued. She was on a voyage from Pillau to Christiania, Norway.
Jenny Lind	United Kingdom	The pilot yawl was run down and sunk off Clevedon, Somerset by the steam barge Enterprise (United Kingdom). Her three crew were rescued by Enterprise.
Kentish Lass	United Kingdom	The barque was driven ashore at St. Margaret's Bay, Kent. She was on a voyage from London to the west coast of Africa. She was refloated and taken into The Downs.
Royal Standard	United Kingdom	The schooner was driven ashore at Penzance, Cornwall. She was on a voyage from Bristol, Gloucestershire to Penzance. She was refloated and taken in to Penzance.
Rurik	Russia	The steamship was driven ashore at Mollösund, Sweden. She was on a voyage from Bremerhaven, Germany to Reval. She was refloated and taken in to Gothenburg, Sweden.
Unnamed	Flag unknown	The steamship was driven ashore at Newhaven, Sussex, United Kingdom. She was refloated and resumed her voyage.

== 2 March ==
List of shipwrecks: 2 March 1878
Ship	State	Description
Enmanuele	Italy	The barque sprang a leak and foundered off Cagliari, Sardinia.
Glencoe	Flag unknown	The 159-ton barque was wrecked when she hit rocks at Gore Bay, north Canterbury, New Zealand after she dragged its anchor during a gale.
Londonderry, and Secret	United Kingdom	The steam colliers collided in the River Thames at Plaistow, Middlesex and were both beached.
Johann Sverdrup	Flag unknown	The ship was wrecked near Casablanca, Morocco. She was on a voyage from Valencia, Spain to Casablanca.
Penguin	United Kingdom	The steamship ran aground at Finkenwerder, Germany. She was on a voyage from Hamburg to London. She was refloated with assistance.
Rooparell	United Kingdom	The full-rigged ship departed from The Downs for Negapatam, India. Presumed foundered with the loss of all hands; a lifebuoy from the ship was discovered off the Abrolhos Archipelago, Brazil in July 1879.
Unnamed	France	The schooner was wrecked at Rhosneigr, Anglesey, United Kingdom with the loss of at least three lives.
Unnamed	Belgium	The barque foundered in the Atlantic Ocean with the loss of all hands.

== 3 March ==
List of shipwrecks: 3 March 1878
Ship	State	Description
Countess	United Kingdom	The brig was wrecked on Fortune Island, Bahamas. She was on a voyage from Fortune Island to Queenstown, County Cork.
Dora	Sweden	The brigantine was driven ashore on Skagen, Denmark. Her crew were rescued. She was on a voyage from Pori, Grand Duchy of Finland to Grimsby, Lincolnshire, United Kingdom.
Northern Star	United Kingdom	The brigantine struck the pier at Ayr and was beached. She was on a voyage from Dublin to Ayr.

== 4 March ==
List of shipwrecks: 4 March 1878
Ship	State	Description
Benefattore	Austria-Hungary	The ship was driven ashore at the Shakespeare Cliff, Kent, United Kingdom. She was on a voyage from London, United Kingdom to Baltimore, Maryland, United States. She was refloated with assistance.
Canterbury	New Zealand	The 34-ton schooner was wrecked at Okakuri Bay when she dragged her anchor during a gale. Her crew survived.
Daphne	United Kingdom	The ship ran aground at Rangoon, Burma. She was refloated.
Emilie Heyse	Germany	The schooner was driven ashore on Terschelling, Friesland, Netherlands. She was on a voyage from Stettin to Dunkirk, Nord, France.
Emma D	United Kingdom	The ship ran aground on the Ostend Bank, off the coast of West Flanders, Belgium. She was on a voyage from Pabellón de Pica, Chile to Ostend, West Flanders. She was refloated and taken in to Vlissingen, Zeeland, Netherlands in a leaky condition.
Fredsael	Norway	The ship ran aground on the North Bull, in the Irish Sea off the coast of County Dublin, United Kingdom. She was on a voyage from New York, United States to Dublin. She was refloated.
Hengist	United Kingdom	The ship ran aground in the Yangon River. She was refloated and resumed her voyage.
Mississippi	United States	The ship was driven ashore at the Shakespeare Cliff. She was on a voyage from Arendal, Norway to New York. She was refloated with assistance.
Queen of Ceylon	United Kingdom	The barque was driven ashore at Dover, Kent. She was on a voyage from Grimsby, Lincolnshire to Mauritius. She was refloated and taken in to Dover.
Prins Senior	Flag unknown	The derelict ship was towed in to Honfleur, Manche, France. She was on a voyage from Sunderland, County Durham, United Kingdom to Lisbon, Portugal.

== 5 March ==
List of shipwrecks: 5 March 1878
Ship	State	Description
Daphne	United Kingdom	The ship was driven ashore and severely damaged at Rangoon, Burma.
D. M. Dickie	United Kingdom	The brigantine was abandoned in the Atlantic Ocean. Her crew were rescued by Providence (United Kingdom). D. M. Dickie was on a voyage from New York, United States to Leith, Lothian.
Dolores	Spain	The felucca was abandoned off Cádiz. Her crew were rescued by Ira (Germany). Dolores was on a voyage from Ceuta to Seville.
Fanny P., and Osprey	Austria-Hungary); United Kingdom	The sloop Osprey was run into by the brigantine Fanny P. (United Kingdom) and sank at Campbeltown, Argyllshire. She was on a voyage from Greenock, Renfrewshire to Londonderry. Fanny P the collided with a fishing lugger and ran ashore. She was on a voyage from New York, United States to Glasgow, Renfrewshire.
Sophie	United Kingdom	The ship capsized at Rangoon.
Sphinx	Austria-Hungary	The steamship was wrecked and burnt at Cape Gregs, 6 nautical miles (11 km) south of Famagusta, Cyprus with the loss of more than 540 of the 3,000 people o board. She was on a voyage from Cavalla, Greece to Latakia, Ottoman Syria.

== 6 March ==
List of shipwrecks: 6 March 1878
Ship	State	Description
Mary Campbell	United Kingdom	The ship was holed by her anchor and sank at Greenock, Renfrewshire. She was on a voyage from Stranraer, Wigtownshire to Glasgow, Renfrewshire. She was refloated on 20 March and taken in to Greenock.
Mary Grace	United Kingdom	The brigantine struck a rock and sank between Alderney, Channel Islands and Saint-Vaast-la-Hougue, Manche, France. Her six crew were rescued by the steamship Griffin (United Kingdom). Mary Grace was on a voyage from Guernsey, Channel Islands to London.
Progress	United Kingdom	The schooner departed from Anstruther, Fife for Stettin, Germany. No further trace, reported missing, presumed foundered with the loss of all six crew.
Richard Grainger	United Kingdom	The schooner struck the Carr Rock, off the coast of Fife and was abandoned by her crew. She was subsequently towed in to the River Tay in a severely damaged condition by the steamship Marie Stewart (United Kingdom).

== 7 March ==
List of shipwrecks: 7 March 1878
Ship	State	Description
HMS Antelope, and John Middleton	Royal Navy; United Kingdom	The steamship John Middleton was run into by Necm-i Şevket (Ottoman Navy) at Tophane, Ottoman Empire. She was driven in to HMS Antelope and sank. Her crew were rescued by HMS Antelope. John Middleton was on a voyage from Odesa, Russia to Antwerp, Belgium. HMS Antelope was severely damaged.
Avington	United Kingdom	The steamship was driven ashore at Pillau, Germany. She was on a voyage from Hartlepool, County Durham to Pillau.
Ellen Jane	United Kingdom	The schooner struck a rock and sank in the Farne Islands, Northumberland. Her five crew were rescued by the steamship Warsaw (United Kingdom). Ellen Jane was on a voyage from London to Grangemouth, Stirlingshire.
Ernst	Denmark	The galiot was driven ashore on Læsø. She was on a voyage from Helsingborg, Sweden to a Scottish port. She was refloated and taken in to Fredrikshavn.
Inverness-shire	United Kingdom	The schooner was driven ashore and damaged at Thurso, Caithness.
Kea	United Kingdom	The schooner sank in the River Tay. She was on a voyage from Newburgh, Fife to Dundee, Forfarshire.
London Packet	United Kingdom	The schooner foundered in the English Channel 3 nautical miles (5.6 km) north by north east of the Royal Sovereign Lightship ( Trinity House). Her four crew survived. She was on a voyage from London to Plymouth, Devon.
Neutral	Netherlands	The schooner capsized off the Goodwin Sands, Kent, United Kingdom. All on board survived. Neutral was on a voyage from Riga, Russia to Cork, United Kingdom. She was subsequently towed in to Calais, France.
Unnamed	United Kingdom	The schooner foundered off Newton-by-the-Sea, Northumberland with the loss of all hands.

== 8 March ==
List of shipwrecks: 8 March 1878
Ship	State	Description
Agnes	Germany	The brig was driven ashore at Bremen. She was on a voyage from Africa to Bremen. She was refloated with assistance.
Boss	United Kingdom	The barque ran aground at Anholt. She was on a voyage from Gävle, Sweden to London. She floated off and sank.
Covenanter	United Kingdom	The barque collided with a derelict vessel and sank 3 nautical miles (5.6 km) north of the Tuskar Rock. Her fourteen crew took to the boats; they were rescued by the brigantine Ophir (United Kingdom).
Danube	United Kingdom	The barque was driven ashore on Doagh Island, off Malin Head, County Donegal. She was on a voyage from Liverpool, Lancashire to Saint John, New Brunswick, Canada.
Helena	United Kingdom	The ship was driven ashore and wrecked at Porthleven, Cornwall. Her crew were rescued.
Highland Chief	United Kingdom	The ship was driven ashore and wrecked at Longhope, Orkney Islands.
Humboldt	Germany	The full-rigged ship was driven ashore at Bremen. She was on a voyage from New York, United States to Bremen. She was later refloated with assistance.
Lizzie	United Kingdom	The schooner was driven ashore and wrecked near "Guassein", Norway. She was on a voyage from Fraserburgh, Aberdeenshire to Königsberg, Germany.
London Packet	United Kingdom	The schooner sprang a leak and sank in the English Channel off Bexhill-on-Sea, Sussex. Her crew survived.
North Point	United States	The steamship was driven ashore on Assateague Island. She was on a voyage from Port Antonio, Jamaica to Philadelphia, Pennsylvania.
Providence	United Kingdom	The schooner was driven ashore and wrecked at Spittal, Northumberland. Her four crew were rescued by rocket apparatus. She was on a voyage from Grangemouth, Stirlingshire to Ipswich, Suffolk.
Rachel Harrison	United Kingdom	The ship capsized in the River Usk at Newport, Monmouthshire.
Two Brothers	United Kingdom	The smack sank at Great Yarmouth, Norfolk.

== 9 March ==
List of shipwrecks: 9 March 1878
Ship	State	Description
Amalia	Germany	The full-rigged ship was driven ashore and wrecked at Egmond aan Zee, North Holland, Netherlands with the loss of ten of her eleven crew. She was on a voyage from Danzig to Honfleur, Manche, France.
Ceres	Denmark	The schooner was driven ashore near "Aebels". She was on a voyage from Middlesbrough, Yorkshire, United Kingdom to Fredericia. She was refloated and resumed her voyage.
Susan	United Kingdom	The Mersey Flat collided with the steamship Lope de Vega (Spain) and sank in the River Mersey off Tranmere, Cheshire.
Timor	United States	The steamship was driven ashore at Philadelphia, Pennsylvania.
Volo	Norway	The schooner was driven ashore on Texel, North Holland. She was on a voyage from Kragerø to Louvaine, East Flanders, Belgium.

== 11 March ==
List of shipwrecks: 11 March 1878
Ship	State	Description
Diligent	France	The brig was wrecked Sant'Antioco, Sardinia, Italy. Her crew were rescued She was on a voyage from Carloforte, Sardinia to Cette, Hérault.

== 13 March ==
List of shipwrecks: 13 March 1878
Ship	State	Description
Alliance	United Kingdom	The schooner was abandoned 10 nautical miles (19 km) off the Borkum Lightship (Germany). Her crew were rescued by Peace (United Kingdom). Alliance was on a voyage from Charlestown, Cornwall to Harburg, Germany.
Norah	Norway	The barque was wrecked on the Lemon and Ower Sand, in the North Sea with the loss of thirteen of her fourteen crew. She was on a voyage from Christiania to Limerick, United Kingdom.
St. Joaquim	Portugal	The schooner was driven ashore at Lydd, Kent. United Kingdom. She was on a voyage from Newcastle upon Tyne, Northumberland, United Kingdom to Lisbon.

== 14 March ==
List of shipwrecks: 14 March 1878
Ship	State	Description
Abbie Fitcombe	United States	The brigantine was driven ashore and wrecked on Anegada, Bahamas. Her crew were rescued.
N. and E. Gardner	Canada	The ship was abandoned in the Atlantic Ocean. Her crew were rescued by the steamship Illinois (United States), which set her afire. N. and E. Gardner was on a voyage from Galveston, Texas, United States to Liverpool, Lancashire, United Kingdom.
Penang	Straits Settlements	The steamship was driven ashore at Samarang, Java, Netherlands East Indies. She was on a voyage from Singapore to Java.
Verna	Norway	The steamship was holed by ice and sank at "Carlos", Russia. She was on a voyage from Reval, Russia to Christiania.
Waterloo	Netherlands	The ship was driven ashore at "Giliang". She was on a voyage from Pekalongan, Java to Amsterdam, North Holland.
West Stanley	United Kingdom	The steamship was driven ashore in the Yangtze, She was on a voyage from Zhenjiang to Shanghai, China.

== 15 March ==
List of shipwrecks: 15 March 1878
Ship	State	Description
Cordillera	United Kingdom	The steamship ran aground in the Gironde at the Bec d'Ambès. She was refloated with the assistance of two tugs and resumed her voyage.
Fairy	United Kingdom	The schooner ran aground on the Newcombe Sand, in the North Sea off the coast of Suffolk. She was on a voyage from London to Hull, Yorkshire. She was refloated with the assistance of a tug and taken in to Lowestoft, Suffolk in a severely leaky condition.
Hampton	United Kingdom	The steamship ran aground. She was on a voyage from Rotterdam, South Holland, Netherlands to Batavia, Netherlands East Indies. She was refloated and taken in to Brouwershaven, Zeeland, Netherlands.
Otto	Flag unknown	The barque foundered in the Atlantic Ocean with the loss of seven of her crew. Survivors took to a boat; they were rescued on 18 March by the barque Amaranth (United Kingdom).

== 16 March ==
List of shipwrecks: 16 March 1878
Ship	State	Description
Dudbrook	United Kingdom	The barque was driven ashore and wrecked at Villaricos, Spain. Her crew were rescued. She was on a voyage from South Shields, County Durham to Villaricos and Garrucha, Spain.
John Carroll	United States	The schooner was driven ashore near Vera, Spain. Her crew were rescued. She was on a voyage from New York to Vera.
Lidagia	Italy	The ship was driven ashore and wrecked at Palomares, Spain.
Rosina	Italy	The ship was driven ashore and wrecked at Palomares.
Trenton	United Kingdom	The ship was driven ashore and wrecked at "Pozol del Esparto", Spain with the loss of one of her eighteen crew. She was on a voyage from Newcastle upon Tyne, Northumberland to "Pozol del Esparto".
William and Mary	United Kingdom	The ship collided with another vessel in the River Blackwater and was beached. She was on a voyage from Maldon, Essex to Goole, Yorkshire. She was refloated and put back to Maldon.
Two unnamed vessels	Italy	The ships were driven ashore and wrecked on the coast of Spain. Their crews were rescued.

== 17 March ==
List of shipwrecks: 17 March 1878
Ship	State	Description
Hilda	United Kingdom	The steamship was damaged by fire at Bremerhaven, Germany.
Rio Duoro	Portugal	The steamship was damaged by fire and an explosion at Antwerp, Belgium with the loss of a crew member.
Rio Formosa	United Kingdom	The steamship ran ashore and was wrecked on Horse Island, County Cork. She was on a voyage from Cork to Bantry, County Cork. She was refloated on 4 May.

== 18 March ==
List of shipwrecks: 18 March 1878
Ship	State	Description
Auspicious	United Kingdom	The abandoned ship foundered off Padstow, Cornwall.
Charles T. Russell	United States	The barque caught fire in the Atlantic Ocean and was abandoned. Her crew were rescued by Charles Cotesworth (United Kingdom). Charles T. Russell was on a voyage from Liverpool, Lancashire, United Kingdom to Bombay, India.
Dahlia	United Kingdom	The steam lighter struck rocks and sank off Spittal Point, Northumberland. Her crew were rescued. She was on a voyage from Newcastle upon Tyne to Berwick upon Tweed. She was refloated on 20 March and taken in to Berwick upon Tweed.
Gratitude	United Kingdom	The ship departed from London for the River Tyne. No further trace, reported missing.
Mary Traill	United Kingdom	The schooner was driven ashore on Papa Westray, Orkney Islands.
Revolving Light	Canada	The ship was damaged by fire at Liverpool. She was on a voyage from Savannah, Georgia, United States to Liverpool.
Spitfire	United Kingdom	The tug suffered a boiler explosion and sank in the River Thames at Sonning, Berkshire with the loss of two of her four crew. She was on a voyage from Sonning Mill to Reading, Berkshire.
State of Virginia	United Kingdom	The steamship ran aground in the Clyde at Greenock, Renfrewshire.
Zacharias	United Kingdom	The ship was driven ashore at "Palomos", Hérault, France. She was on a voyage from London to Cette, Hérault.
Unnamed	Norway	The brigantine ran aground on the West Hoyle Bank, in Liverpool Bay.

== 19 March ==
List of shipwrecks: 19 March 1878
Ship	State	Description
Americana	United States	The ship was driven ashore on Sapelo Island, Georgia. She was on a voyage from Darien, Georgia to Glasgow, Renfrewshire, United Kingdom.
Two unnamed vessels	Russia	The schooners were driven ashore and wrecked at Büyükdere, Ottoman Empire.

== 20 March ==
List of shipwrecks: 20 March 1878
Ship	State	Description
Commercial	United Kingdom	The steamship ran aground on the Pennington Spit, off the coast of Hampshire. She was on a voyage from Plymouth, Devon to Eling, Hampshire. She was refloated and resumed her voyage.
John Snell	United Kingdom	The ship collided with the fishing smack Emily and Hannah (United Kingdom) and was beached at Great Yarmouth, Norfolk. John Snell was on a voyage from Great Yarmouth to the River Tyne.
Stromboli	United Kingdom	The steamship struck the Stag Rocks and was run ashore west of Kynance Cove, Cornwall. All on board were rescued. She was on a voyage from Havre de Grâce, Seine-Inférieure, France to Liverpool, Lancashire. She broke in two the next day.

== 21 March ==
List of shipwrecks: 21 March 1878
Ship	State	Description
Baltic	Germany	The barque was run ashore on Manipa Island, Netherlands East Indies. Her crew survived. She was on a voyage from Surabaya, Netherlands East Indies to Amoy, China.
Elvira	Norway	The brig was abandoned in the North Sea. She was on a voyage from Kragerø to Emden, Germany. She was towed in to Great Yarmouth, Norfolk, United Kingdom.
Friends	United Kingdom	The Thames barge was run into by Bettie Saunders (United Kingdom) and sank in the River Thames at Blackwall, Middlesex. Both crew were rescued.
Newcastle	New South Wales	The ship arrived at Calcutta, India on fire. She was on a voyage from Brisbane, Queensland to Calcutta. The fire was extinguished.

== 22 March ==
List of shipwrecks: 22 March 1878
Ship	State	Description
Cleopatra	United Kingdom	The barque was wrecked a reef 5 nautical miles (9.3 km) off "Point de Pedro", Brazil. All fifteen people on board survived. She was on a voyage from London to Melbourne, Victoria. The wreck was plundered by the local inhabitants.
Feronia	United Kingdom	The ship struck "Wolves Rock", capsized and sank. Her crew were rescued. She was on a voyage from Newport, Monmouthshire to Belfast, County Antrim.
Ivy	United Kingdom	The barque was wrecked on the coast of the Natal Colony 100 nautical miles (190 km) south of Port Natal. Her crew were rescued.
St. Enoch	United Kingdom	The ship departed from Pensacola, Florida, United States for Bombay, India. No further trace, reported missing with her 33 crew.

== 23 March ==
List of shipwrecks: 23 March 1878
Ship	State	Description
Artemesia	United Kingdom	The ship was severely damaged by fire at Troon, Ayrshire.
Florida	Norway	The brigantine ran aground on the Goodwin Sands, Kent, United Kingdom. She was on a voyage from Fredrikstad to Granville, Manche, France. She was refloated with assistance from the Broadstairs and Ramsgate Lifeboats and a tug and assisted in to Ramsgate, Kent.
Malta	Canada	The full-rigged ship departed from New York for London, United Kingdom. No further trace, presumed foundered with the loss of all 30 crew.

== 24 March ==
List of shipwrecks: 24 March 1878
Ship	State	Description
Colorado	United Kingdom	The schooner collided with a barque off The Skerries, Anglesey and was abandoned. Her crew were rescued by the steamship Zaripha (Greece) Colorado was towed in to Holyhead, Anglesey by the steamship Bezos (Spain).
Dauntless	United Kingdom	The brig ran aground on the Ressness Reef off the Danish coast and was abandoned by her crew. She was on a voyage from Burntisland, Fife to Kiel, Germany.
Eclipse	United Kingdom	The schooner was wrecked near the Corsewall Lighthouse, Wigtownshire with the loss of two of her three crew. She was on a voyage from Greenock, Renfrewshire to Islay, Inner Hebrides.
HMS Eurydice	Royal Navy	HMS Eurydice sinking The training ship capsized and sank off Ventnor, Isle of Wight with the loss of 317 of her 319 crew.
Heroine	United Kingdom	The schooner ran aground and was wrecked at Bideford, Devon. Her crew were rescued by the Bideford Lifeboat. She was on a voyage from Sydney to Bideford.
Kent	United Kingdom	The steamship ran aground off Margate, Kent. She was on a voyage from Melbourne, Victoria to London. She was refloated and resumed her voyage.
St. Enoch	United Kingdom	The ship was sighted off Dover, Kent whilst on a voyage from Dundee, Forfarshire to Bombay, India. No further trace, reported missing with her 33 crew.
Trafik	Norway	The steamship was driven ashore at Berlevåg and was damaged.
Watt	United Kingdom	The paddle tug sprang a leak and sank off the Newsand Lightship ( Trinity House). Her crew survived.
Unnamed	United Kingdom	The barge was run down and sunk in the Thames Estuary by the steamship Don (United Kingdom).

== 25 March ==
List of shipwrecks: 25 March 1878
Ship	State	Description
Commodore	United Kingdom	The steamship ran aground in the Inhul River.
Langley	United Kingdom	The steamship ran aground at Sunderland, County Durham and was damaged. She was on a voyage from Sunderland to London. She was refloated and put back to Sunderland.
Lyle	United Kingdom	The steamship sprang a leak and sank in Lough Foyle. Her crew survived. She was on a voyage from Londonderry to "Pametton".
Pater	Austria-Hungary	The barque ran aground on the Scroby Sands, Norfolk, United Kingdom. She was on a voyage from Baltimore, Maryland, United States to King's Lynn, Norfolk. She was refloated and towed in to Great Yarmouth, Norfolk in a leaky condition.
Wakefield	United Kingdom	The steamship ran aground at Grimsby, Lincolnshire.

== 26 March ==
List of shipwrecks: 26 March 1878
Ship	State	Description
Cromwell	United Kingdom	The steamship was sighted off St. Catherine's Point, Isle of Wight whilst on a voyage from Middlesbrough, Yorkshire to Pomaron, Portugal. Subsequently foundered in the Bay of Biscay with the loss of all eighteen or twenty crew.

== 27 March ==
List of shipwrecks: 27 March 1878
Ship	State	Description
Holmstrand	United Kingdom	The ship struck the Hendon Rock, on the coast of County Durham. She was on a voyage from Philadelphia, Pennsylvania, United States to Sunderland, County Durham.
Magnificent	United Kingdom	The ship was damaged by fire at Savannah, Georgia, United States.

== 28 March ==
List of shipwrecks: 28 March 1878
Ship	State	Description
Carl	(Russian Empire) Grand Duchy of Finland	The ship was driven ashore and wrecked near Delfzijl, Groningen, Netherlands. She was on a voyage from Vyborg to Cette, Hérault, France.
Corinna	United Kingdom	The steamship departed from Cardiff, Glamorgan for Malta. No further trace, presumed foundered with the loss of all 22 crew.
Rostock	Germany	The steamship was driven ashore on Nexø, Denmark. She was on a voyage from Danzig to Bergen, Norway.
Spartan	United Kingdom	The ship was driven ashore on Fire Island, New York, United States. She was on a voyage from Dublin to New York City. She was refloated with assistance on 14 May.
Star of Peace	United Kingdom	The Thames barge was driven ashore in Pegwell Bay, Kent. Her three crew were rescued by the Ramsgate Lifeboat Bradford ( Royal National Lifeboat Institution).
Theresa	United Kingdom	The barque ran aground on the Barber Sand, in the North Sea off the coast of Norfolk, and was abandoned by the eleven people on board, who were rescued by the Caister Lifeboat. She was on a voyage from North Shields, Northumberland to Rouen, Seine-Inférieure, France. She floated off and came ashore at Great Yarmouth, Norfolk, where she was wrecked.
Three Brothers	United Kingdom	The ship was driven ashore at Yarmouth, Isle of Wight. Her crew were rescued. She was on a voyage from Newport, Isle of Wight to Weymouth, Dorset.
Wladimir	Courland Governorate	The brig ran aground on Scroby Sands, Norfolk. She was on a voyage from Rochester, Kent to Grimsby, Lincolnshire, United Kingdom. She floated off and sank. Her crew were rescued by the Caister Lifeboat.

== 29 March ==
List of shipwrecks: 29 March 1878
Ship	State	Description
Adventure	United Kingdom	The ship ran aground on the Barrows Sandbank, in the North Sea off the coast of Essex. Her crew were rescued by the steamship Widgeon (United Kingdom).
Ankathor	Norway	The brig was driven ashore and wrecked on Vlieland, Friesland, Netherlands.
Antias	United Kingdom	The schooner was driven ashore and wrecked at North Somercotes, Lincolnshire with the loss of all hands.
Atalanta	United Kingdom	The barque was abandoned at sea. Her crew were rescued by the barque Bellona (United Kingdom). Atalanta was on a voyage from Newport, Monmouthshire to Dakar, Senegal.
Avalon	United Kingdom	The steamship was driven ashore at Harwich, Essex. She was on a voyage from Rotterdam, South Holland, Netherlands to Harwich. She was refloated.
Ellen Williamson	United Kingdom	The schooner collided with the steamship Camel (United Kingdom) off Great Cumbrae, Argyllshire and was severely damaged. Ellen Williamson was on a voyage from Glasgow, Renfrewshire to Liverpool, Lancashire. She was towed in to Millport, where she sank.
Four Brothers	United Kingdom	The barge sank off Ryde, Isle of Wight.
Frederick	United Kingdom	The schooner collided with the brig Minsted (Norway) and sank off the Isle of Scilly with the loss of four of the six people on board. Survivors were rescued by Minsted.
Hüdavendigâr, and Tiara	Ottoman Navy; United Kingdom	The steamship Tiara collided with the frigate Hüdavendigâr and was severely damaged. She was beached at the Leander Tower, Ottoman Empire. She was on a voyage from Odesa, Russia to an English port. Hüdavendigâr was also severely damaged. She was taken in to Constantinople for repairs.
I. C.	United Kingdom	The brig was driven ashore and wrecked at Kessingland, Suffolk. Her crew were rescued.
Lady of the Lake	United Kingdom	The schooner was abandoned off Sidmouth, Devon. Her three crew were taken off by the Sidmouth Lifeboat.
Laurel	United Kingdom	The barque ran aground on the Haisborough Sands, in the North Sea off the coast of Norfolk. She was on a voyage from Sunderland, County Durham to Damietta, Egypt. She was refloated with assistance from the smack Dawn (United Kingdom) and taken in to Harwich in a leaky condition. Laurel was beached at Shotley, Suffolk.
Little Florrie	United Kingdom	The smack foundered off the coast of Devon with the loss of all hands. She was on a voyage from Minehead, Somerset to Falmouth, Cornwall.
Mariane Boustead	France	The schooner was run ashore at Figueira da Foz, Portugal. She was on a voyage from Huelva, Spain to the Clyde.
Mary Elizabeth	United Kingdom	The schooner ran aground at Villareal, Spain. She was on a voyage from Málaga to Villareal.
Olive Branch	United Kingdom	The ship was driven ashore 1 nautical mile (1.9 km) west of Watchet, Somerset. Her three crew were rescued by the Watchett Lifeboat.
Rose	United Kingdom	The ship was driven ashore 1 nautical mile (1.9 km) west of Watchet. Her crew were rescued.
Scrabster	United Kingdom	The steamship was driven ashore and wrecked at Dover, Kent. Her crew were rescued by the steamship Belgian (United Kingdom). Scrabster was on a voyage from Calais, France to London.
St. George	United Kingdom	The schooner was driven ashore and wrecked at Sharp Nose. Her crew were rescued. She was on a voyage from Looe, Cornwall to Swansea, Glamorgan.
Stork	United Kingdom	The schooner collided with Thomas and Isabella (United Kingdom) and was run ashore 8 nautical miles (15 km) south of Bridlington, Yorkshire, where she was wrecked. Her crew were rescued by Thomas and Isabella. Stork was on a voyage from Trouville-sur-Mer, Calvados to Blyth, Northumberland.
William Hill	United Kingdom	The brig was driven ashore at Kingscross, Arran. Her crew were rescued. She was on a voyage from Drogheda, County Louth to Troon, Ayrshire.
Unnamed	United Kingdom	The schooner was driven ashore and damaged at Harwich.
Unnamed	Flag unknown	The schooner was driven ashore at Yealm Point, Devon.
Unknown	Flag unknown	The ship was driven ashore at the Landguard Fort, Felixtowe, Suffolk.

== 30 March ==
List of shipwrecks: 30 March 1878
Ship	State	Description
Alma	United Kingdom	The fishing schooner foundered in the Atlantic Ocean 120 nautical miles (220 km) off Cape Clear Island, County Cork. Her crew were rescued by Anna Bella (United Kingdom).
Deerhound	United Kingdom	The smack was driven ashore and wrecked at Great Yarmouth, Norfolk. Her crew were rescued by rocket apparatus.
Deodristig	Sweden	The barque was abandoned by her crew and subsequently ran aground on the Spile Sand, off the north coast of Kent, United Kingdom. She was on a voyage from St. Ubes, Portugal to Gothenburg. She was refloated with the assistance of some smacks and taken in to Whitstable, Kent in a leaky condition.
Eirene	United Kingdom	The steamship was driven ashore and wrecked at Wissant, Pas-de-Calais, France with the loss of nine of her 22 crew. Survivors were rescued by rocket apparatus. She was on a voyage from South Shields, County Durham to San Francisco, California, United States.
Elizabeth and Catherine	United Kingdom	The barque was driven ashore at Littlestone-on-Sea, Kent. She was on a voyage from Sunderland, County Durham to Alexandria, Egypt. She was refloated with assistance and put in to Dover, Kent in a leaky conditio .
Emerald	United Kingdom	The steamship was driven ashore on Heligoland. She was refloated the next day and resumed her voyage.
Fawn	United Kingdom	The fishing boat foundered off the Isles of Scilly with the loss of all hands.
Glance	United Kingdom	The fishing boat foundered off the Isles of Scilly with the loss of all hands.
Inga	United Kingdom	The barque foundered off Margate, Kent.
London	United Kingdom	The schooner was abandoned 30 nautical miles (56 km) north of the Longships, Cornwall. Her five crew were rescued by the steamship Avoca (United Kingdom). London was subsequently discovered by the fishing lugger Betsey (United Kingdom), which took her in tow. The tow rope broke and she was believed to have foundered.
Loyal	United Kingdom	The ship ran aground on the Gunfleet Sand, in the North Sea off the coast of Essex. She was on a voyage from Kristiansand to London or vice versa. She was refloated and taken in to Gravesend, Kent in a leaky condition.
Luna	United Kingdom	The ship ran aground on the Gunfleet Sand. She was on a voyage from London to Trinidad. She was refloated and taken in to Gravesend in a leaky condition.
Overijssel	Netherlands	The steamship ran aground at Oudshoorn, South Holland. She was on a voyage from Glasgow, Renfrewshire, United Kingdom to Rotterdam, South Holland. She was refloated and resumed her voyage.
Psalm	United Kingdom	The steamship was driven ashore at Harwich, Essex. She was on a voyage from Rotterdam to Harwich.
Stallingborough	United Kingdom	The steamship foundered in the Atlantic Ocean 50 nautical miles (93 km) south west of the Longships, Cornwall. Her 24 crew took to two boats. Sixteen in the lifeboat were rescued by the steamship Vesta (United Kingdom), Eight in another boat were reported missing, presumed drowned. Stallingborough was on a voyage from Cardiff, Glamorgan to Malta.
Unnamed	Flag unknown	The ship ran aground on the Spile Sand.

== 31 March ==
List of shipwrecks: 31 March 1878
Ship	State	Description
Dairy Maid	United Kingdom	The fishing smack foundered. Her crew were rescued.
Maudslie	United States	The ship struck the pier at Dunkirk, Nord, France and sank. She was on a voyage from Baltimore, Maryland to Dunkirk.

== Unknown date ==
List of shipwrecks: Unknown date in March 1878
Ship	State	Description
Admiral and James	United Kingdom	The schooner was wrecked in Thurso Bay. Her crew were rescued by the Thurso Lifeboat.
Anna Cecilia	United Kingdom	The ship was driven ashore at "Bonson". She was on a voyage from Surabaya, Netherlands East Indies to Amoy, China. She was a total loss.
Anna Maria	Sweden	The ship was driven ashore. She was on a voyage from Oskarshamn to Hartlepool, County Durham, United Kingdom. She was refloated and taken in to Gothenburg, where she arrived on 1 April.
Assyrian	United Kingdom	The ship was driven ashore and wrecked at Cape Elaphonisi, Crete.
Biddick	United Kingdom	The steamship was driven ashore and damaged in the Seine. She was refloated with the assistance of three tugs and taken in to Rouen, Seine-Inférieure, France.
Celestial Empire	United States	The ship was abandoned at sea before 11 March. She was on a voyage from Bremerhaven, Germany to New York.
Chimborazo	United Kingdom	The steamship was driven ashore at Beecroft Head, New South Wales before 11 March. She was on a voyage from London to Sydney, New South Wales. She was refloated and completed her voyage.
Concordia	United Kingdom	The barque was abandoned in the Pacific Ocean before 11 March. Her crew were rescued by Beta.
Cypress	United Kingdom	The steamship was driven ashore and wrecked at Palavas-les-Flots, Hérault, France. She was on a voyage from Puerto Cortés, British Honduras to Cette, Hérault.
David	United Kingdom	The brigantine was on the coast of Portugal before 15 March with the loss of six of her nine crew. She was on a voyage from Sierra Leone to Hamburg, Germany.
Dispatch	United Kingdom	The schooner was abandoned off Lindisfarne, Northumberland. Her three crew were rescued by the Lindisfarne Lifeboat.
Eintracht	Germany	The schooner struck rocks and sank off Boa Vista Island, Cape Verde Islands. Her crew were rescued. She was on a voyage from Bremen to Maio Island, Cape Verde Islands.
Emilie	Germany	The brig was wrecked on Île à Vache, Haiti. Her crew were rescued.
Ethelbert	United Kingdom	The fishing smack foundered in the North Sea with the loss of all six crew.
Fjaere	Norway	The brig foundered at sea before 15 March. Her crew were rescued by the fishing smack Diogenes (United Kingdom). Fjaere was on a voyage from Hull, Yorkshire, United Kingdom to Karlskrona, Sweden.
Flora M. Crowley	United States	The schooner caught fire in the Atlantic Ocean and was abandoned before 26 March.
Forray	United Kingdom	The brig was abandoned at sea. Her crew were rescued. She was on a voyage from Grimsby, Lincolnshire to Karlskrona.
Friend	United Kingdom	The lugger was driven ashore and wrecked on Holy Isle, in the Firth of Clyde before 9 March. Her crew survived.
Hallamshire	United Kingdom	The ship was driven ashore at Ras al Hadd, Muscat and Oman. She was on a voyage from London to Bushire, Persia. She was refloated and completed her voyage.
Hutton	United Kingdom	The steamship ran aground in the Suez Canal on or before 19 March. She was on a voyage from Cardiff, Glamorgan to Bombay, India. She was refloated five days later and resuumed her voyage.
Isabelle Henriette	France	The barque was wrecked in the Tonalá River.
Magdala	United Kingdom	The ship was wrecked on Cay Sal, Bahamas. Her crew were rescued. She was on a voyage from Mobile, Alabama to Glasgow, Renfrewshire.
Maggie	United Kingdom	The ship was driven ashore and severely damaged at Nassau, Bahamas. She was on a voyage from Swansea, Glamorgan to Acklin Island. She was refloated and taken in to Nassau for repairs.
Maria Clotilde	United Kingdom	The schooner was abandoned at sea. Her crew were rescued by the steamship Nachimoff (Russia). Maria Clotilde was on a voyage from Cardiff, Glamorgan to Naples, Italy.
Mary	United Kingdom	The schooner was abandoned in Thurso Bay. Her crew were rescued by the Thurso Lifeboat.
Mary Anne	United Kingdom	The smack was abandoned in Thurso Bay. Her crew were rescued by the Thurso Lifeboat.
Max Ernst	Germany	The barque struck a rock and was wrecked on the coast of Haiti before 16 March. Her crew were rescued.
Merchant	New South Wales	The ship foundered off Dunk Island, Queensland between 5 and 20 March with the loss of all hands, at least 30 lives.
Minnie Graham	United Kingdom	The barque was wrecked on the Hormigas Reef, 30 nautical miles (56 km)) off Callao, Peru. Her crew were rescued. She was on a voyage from Valparaíso, Chile to Callao.
Oriental	United Kingdom	The barque was wrecked on Maldon Island before 25 March. Her crew survived.
Orrington	United Kingdom	The steamship was driven ashore at Pillau, Germany.
Otto George	Germany	The ship was abandoned at sea before 4 March. She was on a voyage from London to New York.
Panda	United Kingdom	The barque was driven ashore at Port Natal, Natal Colony. Her crew were rescued.
Peer of the Realm	United Kingdom	The ship was driven ashore. She was refloated and taken in to Aden, Aden Colony, where she arrived on 6 March for repairs.
Peter Roberts	United Kingdom	The brifgantine was driven ashore on Bare Bush Cay. She was on a voyage from Halifax, Nova Scotia, Canada to Savannah, Georgia, United States.
Phoenix	United Kingdom	The schooner was abandoned in Thurso Bay. Her crew were rescued by the Thurso Lifeboat.
Pretty Jemima	United Kingdom	The ship was abandoned in the Atlantic Ocean before 14 March. Her crew were rescued. She was on a voyage from Beaufort, South Carolina, United States to London.
Rachel Lewis	United Kingdom	The brig was abandoned at sea. Her crew were rescued by Edwin Fox (United Kingdom).
Stephanie	Germany	The ship was beached on the Lumenplate, near Bremen. She was on a voyage from Bremen to New York, United States and Bahia, Brazil. She was refloated with assistance.
Velocity	United Kingdom	The schooner was abandoned off Porthdinllaen, Caernarfonshire. Her three crew were rescued by the Porthdinllaen Lifeboat.
Viola	United Kingdom	The ship was abandoned at sea. Her crew were rescued by the barque Calcutta (United Kingdom). Viola was on a voyage from New York to Penarth, Glamorgan.
