= William Reynolds (footballer, born 1879) =

English footballer

Personal information
- Full name: William Reynolds
- Date of birth: 22 July 1879
- Place of birth: County Tyrone, Ireland
- Date of death: 1973 (aged 93–94)
- Place of death: Wirral, England
- Height: 5 ft 9 in (1.75 m)
- Position: Forward

Senior career*
Years	Team	Apps	(Gls)
1901–1903	Manchester City	0	(0)
1903–1904	Burton United	7	(1)
1904–1905	Clapton Orient	11	(5)
1905–1906	Grimsby Town	6	(0)
1906–1907	Swindon Town	4	(2)
1907–1908	Croydon Common	5	(1)
1908–	Maidstone United		
1912	FC St. Gallen		

Managerial career
- 1911–1913: AFC Amsterdam
- * Club domestic league appearances and goals

William Reynolds (22 July 1879 – 1973), sometimes called Billy Reynolds, was an Irish-born English professional footballer who played as a forward in the Football League for Burton United and Grimsby Town.

== Career ==
Reynolds began his career with Manchester City, but never appeared for the first team and later played for a number of Football League and Southern League clubs. He later managed AFC Amsterdam.

== Career statistics ==
Appearances and goals by club, season and competition
Club	Season	League			National Cup		Total	
Club	Season	Division	Apps	Goals	Apps	Goals	Apps	Goals
Burton United	1903–04	Second Division	7	1	0	0	7	1
Clapton Orient	1904–05	Southern League Second Division	11	5	6	3	17	8
Grimsby Town	1905–06	Second Division	6	0	0	0	6	0
Swindon Town	1906–07	Southern League First Division	4	2	0	0	4	2
Croydon Common	1907–08	Southern League Second Division	5	1	0	0	5	1
Career total			33	9	6	3	39	12

== Personal life ==
Outside football, Reyolds was a schoolmaster. His younger brother Jack was also a footballer and manager.
