= Jaap van der Leck =

Dutch football manager (1911–2000)

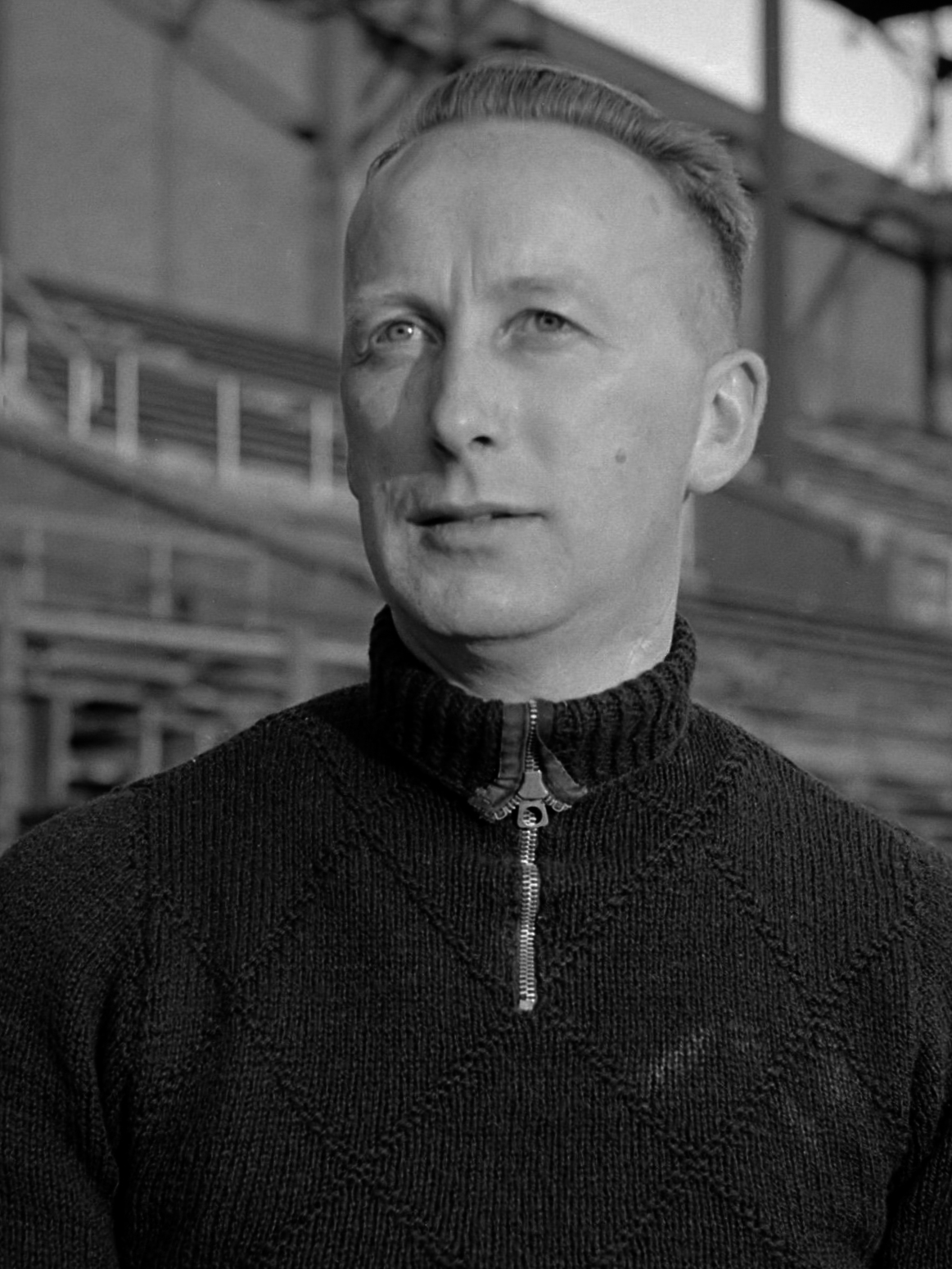
- Van der Leck in 1951

Personal information
- Date of birth: 10 September 1911
- Place of birth: Oudshoorn, Netherlands
- Date of death: 18 November 2000 (aged 89)
- Place of death: Tilburg, Netherlands

Senior career*
Years	Team	Apps	(Gls)
- ARC

Managerial career
- DSO
- 1939–1941: RFC Rotterdam
- UVV Utrecht
- 19xx–1944: De Volewijckers
- 1944–1949: DOS Utrecht
- 1949–1954: Netherlands
- 1954–1956: SC Enschede
- 1956–1958: Feyenoord
- 1959–1961: DOS Utrecht
- 1961–1963: Heracles Almelo
- 1963–1966: Willem II
- 1966–1967: DWS
- 1967–1971: Willem II
- * Club domestic league appearances and goals

Jaap van der Leck (10 September 1911, Oudshoorn – 18 November 2000 in Tilburg) was a Dutch football manager.

He worked for DSO, RFC Rotterdam, UVV Utrecht, De Volewijckers, the Netherlands national football team, SC Enschede, Feyenoord, DOS Utrecht, Heracles Almelo, Willem II, DWS. van der Leck did win the dutch championship as manager with De Volewijckers in 1944. And two times the dutch Eerste Divisie. First time with Heracles Almelo in the season 1961/1962 and second time with Willem II in the season 1964/1965.
