= Robert Guerain =

Dutch footballer

Personal information
- Full name: Robert Oepkes Guerain
- Date of birth: 17 January 1992 (age 34)
- Place of birth: Almere, Netherlands
- Height: 1.81 m (5 ft 11 in)
- Position: Left back

Youth career
- SC Buitenboys
- Omniworld
- 2006–2007: Utrecht
- 2007–2011: PSV

Senior career*
Years	Team	Apps	(Gls)
2012–2014	Almere City	23	(0)
2014–2015	Triestina		
2015	Huizen		
2015–2016	Nieuw Utrecht		
2016–2017	Hercules		
2017–2019	ZSGOWMS		
2019–2020	FC Almere		
2020–2021	DHSC		

International career
2006–2007	Netherlands U15	5	(0)
- * Club domestic league appearances and goals

Robert Oepkes Guerain (born 17 January 1992) is a Dutch former footballer who played as a left-back. He has gained five caps for the Netherlands U15 team.

== Football career ==
Guerain played in the PSV youth academy for five years. In 2012, he moved to Almere City. In January 2014, he left Almere due to a lack of future prospects. After a trial in Romania with Ceahlăul Piatra Neamț did not pan out, he practiced with SV Huizen in mid-2014. In the summer of 2014, Guerain found a new professional club in Italian club Triestina. After six months, he returned to the Netherlands to play in the Saturday Hoofdklasse A for SV Huizen.

Guerain since played for several lower-tier clubs in the Netherlands, including Nieuw Utrecht, USV Hercules, ZSGOWMS, and FC Almere. In October 2020, he signed with DHSC in the Hoofdklasse, a club which Wesley Sneijder was involved with, before retiring at the end of the season.

== Outside football ==
Guerain founded Certo in 2019, a sales recruitment agency. He formerly worked with software sales.
