= Rob Baan =

Dutch football coach

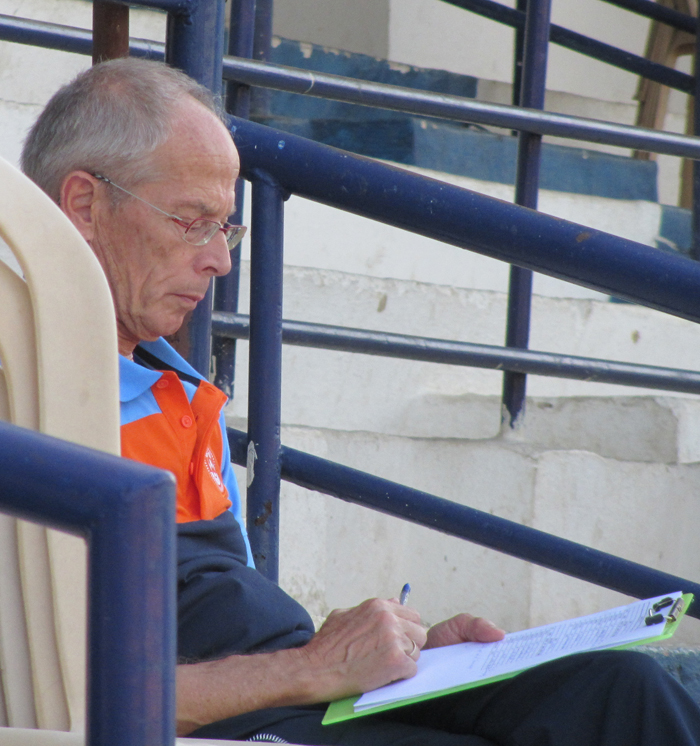
- Baan as technical director of India in May 2012

Personal information
- Full name: Robert Baan
- Date of birth: 1 April 1943 (age 83)
- Place of birth: Rotterdam, Netherlands
- Position: Midfielder

Team information
- Current team: Al-Ansar FC (manager)

Managerial career
- Years: Team
- 1965–1966: Fortuna Vlaardingen (youth)
- 1965–1966: Sparta Rotterdam (youth)
- 1966–1972: ADO Den Haag (assistant)
- 1972–1978: VVV-Venlo
- 1978–1983: Netherlands (assistant)
- 1981: Netherlands (caretaker)
- 1983–1986: ADO Den Haag
- 1986–1987: Roda JC
- 1988–1990: Sparta Rotterdam
- 1990–1992: Cambuur Leeuwarden
- 1992–1994: FC Twente
- 1994–1995: Excelsior Rotterdam
- 1995–1998: PSV Eindhoven (assistant)
- 1998–2004: Feyenoord (technical director)
- 2004–2005: Al-Jazeera Club (technical director)
- 2005–2006: Netherlands (youth technical director)
- 2006: ADO Den Haag (technical director)
- 2007: Australia U-23
- 2007–2008: Australia (technical director)
- 2011–2014: India (technical director)

Robert Baan (born 1 April 1943 in Rotterdam) is a Dutch football coach. He was coach of FC VVV, Roda JC, and FC Twente, assistant coach of PSV and assistant and interim coach of the Dutch national football team. He won Dutch First Division championships with FC Den Haag in 1986 and Cambur Leeuwarden in 1992. He was appointed to the role of technical director for the India national team by the AIFF. He was the technical director of All India Football Federation.

== Biography ==
Baan was born in Rotterdam, South Holland. He played football in the 1960s for the youth team of Sparta and the amateur club RFC Rotterdam. In 1965 he became a youth coach at Fortuna Vlaardingen. Before joining the Indian team, he served the technical director role for the Netherlands, Feyenoord Rotterdam and ADO Den Haag.

While Graham Arnold was the caretaker coach for the Socceroos, Baan, alongside his technical director duties, was also briefly the caretaker coach for the Australia Under 23 team. He was briefly appointed as a caretaker manager for the Netherlands for a 3–0 win over Cyprus in February 1981, and for Australia in 2007 for a 1–0 victory at Craven Cottage against Nigeria.

He announced his retirement from his job as technical director of Australian football and his position has been replaced by Han Berger.
