= Jack Reynolds (footballer, born 1881) =

English footballer and manager

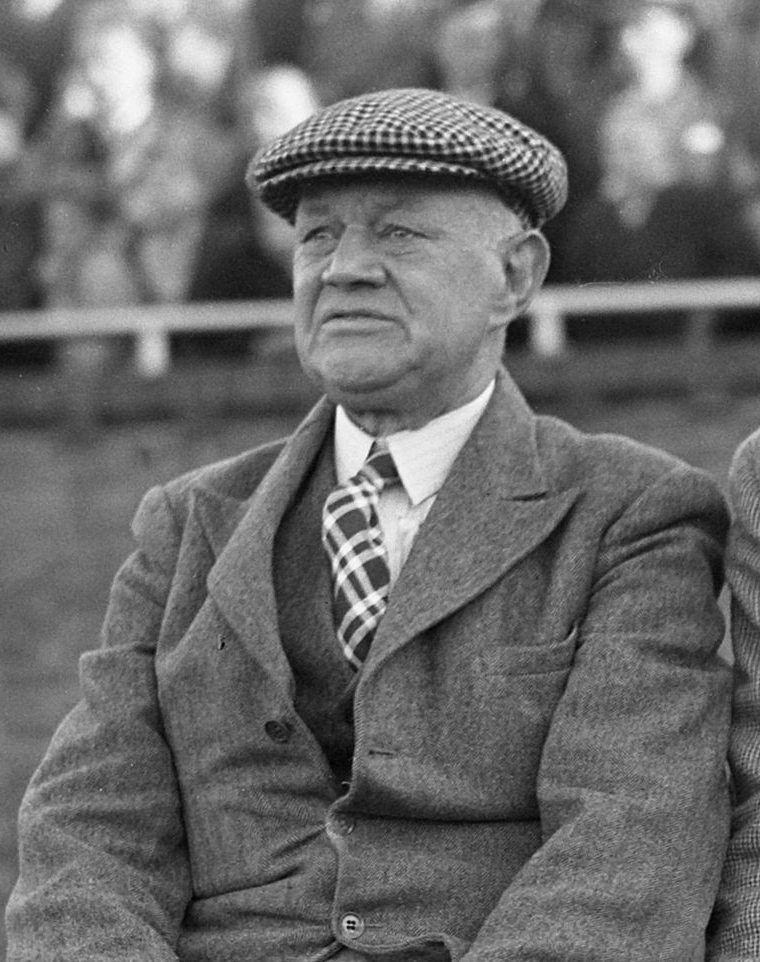

Personal information
- Full name: John Reynold
- Date of birth: 23 September 1881
- Place of birth: Whitefield, England
- Date of death: 8 November 1962 (aged 81)
- Place of death: Amsterdam, Netherlands
- Position: Winger

Senior career*
| Years | Team | Apps | (Gls) |
| 1902 | Manchester City | 0 | (0) |
| 1903 | Burton United | 32 | (3) |
| 1904–1905 | Grimsby Town | 29 | (3) |
| 1905–1907 | Sheffield Wednesday | 2 | (0) |
| 1907–1908 | Watford | 27 | (4) |
| 1908–1911 | New Brompton | 108 | (16) |
- Rochdale

Managerial career
- 1912–1914: St. Gallen
- 1915–1925: Ajax
- 1919: Netherlands
- 1920: MVV
- 1925–1928: Blauw Wit
- 1927–1928: AFC Amsterdam
- 1928–1940: Ajax
- 1945–1947: Ajax
- * Club domestic league appearances and goals

Jack Reynolds (John Reynold) (23 September 1881 – 8 November 1962) was an English football manager and player. He was the manager of Ajax from 1915 to 1925, 1928 to 1940, and 1945 to 1947. He was one of the pioneers of the Total Football system of playing, and is considered among the best managers the team has had, also influencing Rinus Michels, who made his debut as a player for Ajax under Reynolds. He also managed the Swiss side St Gallen.

== Personal life ==
Reynolds was born in Whitefield, now Greater Manchester, to Elisabeth Guinness and John Reynolds. He was married to Heintje Elze.

Reynolds' older brother Billy was also a footballer.

== Honours ==
Ajax

- Netherlands Football League Championship: 1917–18, 1918–19, 1930–31, 1931–32, 1933–34, 1936–37, 1938–39, 1946–47
- KNVB Cup: 1916–17
