= Ondiep =

Coordinates: 52.10°N 5.10°E

- Working-class district
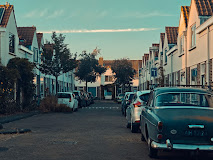
- Historic Street In Ondiep
- Interactive map of Ondiep
- Location in Utrecht
- Established: 1915

Ondiep is a characteristic working-class neighborhood in Utrecht-Northwest, known for its close-knit community and deep-rooted working-class heritage. Built literally on the shallow banks of the Vecht River, the neighborhood creates a vibrant contrast between the river's historic quays and the bustle of Amsterdamsestraatweg.

Ondiep was constructed starting 1915. From the 1930, the district was used to house "abnormals", under the supervision of police, social work and medical workers. While it was intended to have an educational function, training its resident to integrate into society and eventually move out of Ondiep, this seldom happened, adding to the district's reputation as a ghetto within Utrecht.

The population has traditionally been highly sedentary with a high percentage of people being born there continuing to live in the district after marriage.

== 2007 riots ==
On 11 March 2007, Rinie Mulder, a 54-year-old resident of Ondiep was shot and killed by a police officer. Mulder had previously reported nuisance caused by young loiterers, but both the municipality and the police failed to respond to his complaints. On the day of the incident, a fight broke out between local residents and the loiterers. Two motorcycle officers arrived on the scene, and one of them shot Mulder, believing he was threatening her with a knife. Forensic investigation later revealed that the officer did not fire a warning shot, but shot Mulder once, hitting him in the heart and causing his death.

The following evening, groups of young people from the neighborhood vandalised the area, prompting Mayor Annie Brouwer-Korf to close off the neighborhood on 13 March. Only residents were allowed to enter or leave through one point. The closure was due to police reports that potential rioters, known as "riot tourists," from both within and outside of Utrecht were planning to visit the area, which the mayor hoped to prevent with her measure. A group of 135 people were arrested for violating the ban on gatherings. After a silent march organized by Gradus Kwarten, a friend of Mulder, which was attended by approximately 1,500 people on 15 March, the closure was lifted.

The officer who shot Mulder was acquitted, as the Public Prosecution Service (Openbaar Ministerie; OM) believed that she had no chance to escape and had acted in self-defense. The OM argued that the officer had to use her weapon to defend her own life. The National Criminal Investigation Department (Rijksrecherche) conducted an investigation into Mulder's death and considered only the motorcycle officer and one colleague to be reliable witnesses to the shooting incident. There were other people nearby, but they had not seen anything themselves, according to the department.

== Sport ==
The neighborhood is home to association football club DHSC (DOS Holland Stichtse Boys Combinatie). The club was formed in 2004 after a merger between the football clubs DOS and Holland, and was initially known as DHC '04. In 2007, the club merged again, this time with Stichtse Boys, resulting in the current club name. The club's home ground is the "Sportpark Wesley Sneijder", named after the famous football player who was born and raised in the Ondiep neighborhood. In addition, the neighborhood was also home to the judo club Anton Geesink.
