= Charles Lungen =

Dutch footballer

Personal information
- Date of birth: 13 April 1908
- Date of death: 20 October 1972 (aged 64)

International career
Years	Team	Apps	(Gls)
1937	Netherlands	1	(0)

Charles Lungen (13 April 1908 – 20 October 1972) was a Dutch footballer. He played in one match for the Netherlands national football team in 1937.
