= Maxim Gullit =

Dutch footballer (born 2001)

Personal information
- Date of birth: 20 May 2001 (age 25)
- Place of birth: Zaanstad, Netherlands
- Height: 1.90 m (6 ft 3 in)
- Position: Defender

Youth career
- 2005–2017: AFC
- 2017–2019: AZ

Senior career*
Years	Team	Apps	(Gls)
2019–2021	Jong AZ	55	(0)
2020–2021	AZ	0	(0)
2021–2023	Cambuur	7	(0)

International career
2019	Netherlands U19	7	(0)
- * Club domestic league appearances and goals as of 28 May 2023

Maxim Gullit (born 20 May 2001) is a Dutch retired footballer who played as a defender.

His father is former professional footballer Ruud Gullit and his mother is socialite Estelle Cruijff, a niece of Ajax and Barcelona legend Johan Cruyff.

== Club career ==
Born in Zaanstad, Gullit was a youth player with Amsterdamsche FC from 2005 to 2017 before joining the academy of AZ Alkmaar, before making his debut with Jong AZ on 22 April 2019 as a 71st-minute substitute for Joris Kramer in a 0–0 draw with FC Twente. He made his debut for the senior team on 29 October 2020 as a 90th-minute substitute for Bruno Martins Indi in a 4–1 victory over Rijeka in the Europa League. On 27 August 2021, Gullit joined newly promoted Eredivisie side Cambuur on a two-year deal with the option of a third.

== International career ==
Eligible to play for the Netherlands, Suriname and Croatia, Gullit played for the Netherlands under-19 team.

== Personal life ==
His father is former Netherlands international Ruud Gullit. His mother Estelle Cruijff is the daughter of Henny Cruijff, Johan Cruyff's brother. His maternal grandmother, Jadranka Lokas, is an ethnic Croat from Šibenik.

== Career statistics ==
As of match played 29 October 2020

Appearances and goals by club, season and competition
Club	Season	League			Cup (Note: Includes KNVB Cup)		Continental		Total	
Club	Season	Division	Apps	Goals	Apps	Goals	Apps	Goals	Apps	Goals
Jong AZ	2018–19	Eerste Divisie	1	0	—		—		1	0
Jong AZ	2019–20	Eerste Divisie	20	0	—		—		20	0
Jong AZ	2020–21	Eerste Divisie	8	0	—		—		8	0
Jong AZ	Total		21	0	—		—		21	0
AZ Alkmaar	2020–21	Eredivisie	0	0	0	0	1 (Note: Appearance(s) in UEFA Europa League)	0	1	0
Career total			29	0	0	0	1	0	30	0
