= Gé van Dijk =

Dutch footballer and coach (1923–2005)

Gérard van Dijk
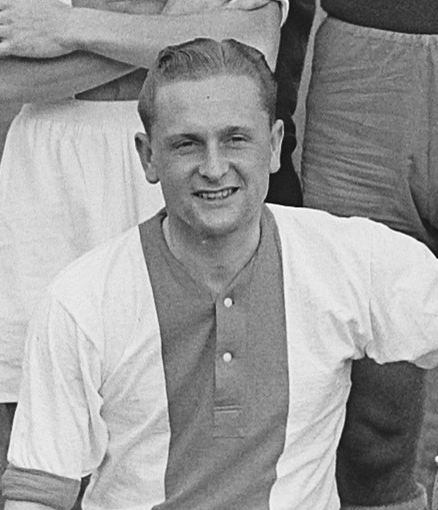
- Van Dijk in 1951

Personal information
- Full name: Gerard Jan van Dijk
- Date of birth: 23 August 1923
- Place of birth: Amsterdam, Netherlands
- Date of death: 29 May 2005 (aged 81)
- Position: Forward

Senior career*
Years	Team	Apps	(Gls)
1943–1957	Ajax	317	(80)

International career
1947–1948	Netherlands	2	(0)
- * Club domestic league appearances and goals

Gérard ("Gé") van Dijk (15 August 1923 in Amsterdam – 29 May 2005) was a Dutch football player and coach.

== Club career ==
He played his entire career (1943–1957) for Ajax, winning two league titles (1947 and the first edition of the professional Eredivisie in 1957). He played 317 league matches and scored 80 goals and was the top goalscorer for the team in the 1950-51 season. He famously refused an offer to play for Italian side Novara in 1952 because he deemed it too rude to leave Ajax.

== International career ==
He won two caps for the Netherlands national football team from 1947 to 1948, in friendlies against Switzerland and Belgium.

== Personal life ==
=== Death ===
Van Dijk died in May 2005.
