= DHSC (football club) =

Former Dutch football club

- Full name: DOS Holland Stichtse Boys Combinatie
- Founded: 1 July 2007; 18 years ago
- Dissolved: 24 June 2024; 17 months ago
- Ground: Sportpark Wesley Sneijder, Utrecht
- Final season; 2023–24: 11th in Vierde Divisie (dissolved)
Home colours

DOS Holland Stichtse Boys Combinatie, commonly known as DHSC, was a Dutch association football club based in the Ondiep district of Utrecht. The team last competed in the Vierde Divisie, the fifth tier of the Dutch football league system, and played its home matches at Sportpark Wesley Sneijder.

== History ==
=== VV DOS (1901–2004) ===
VV DOS
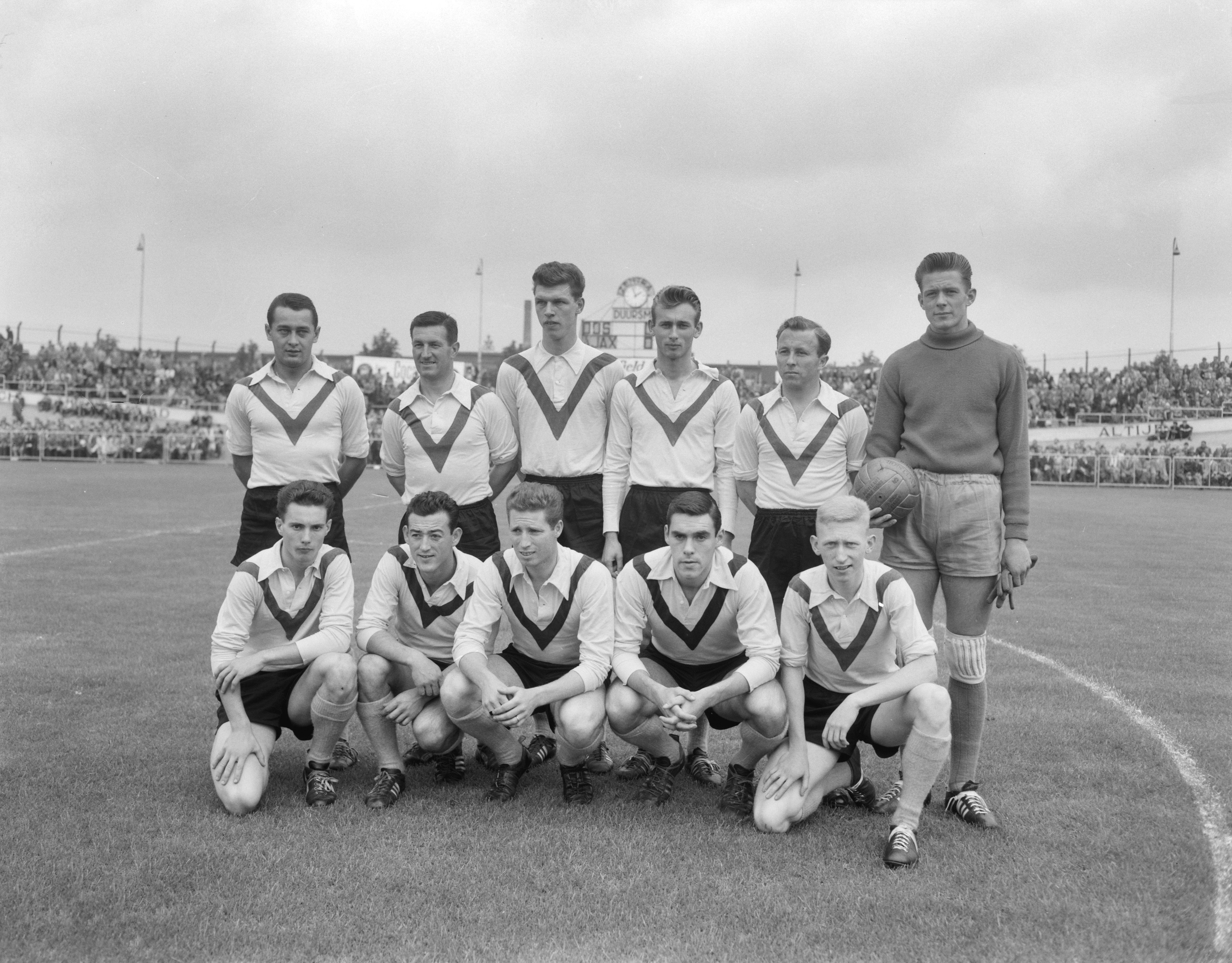
- The players of VV DOS before playing 2–2 against AFC Ajax
- Full name: Voetbalvereniging Door Oefening Sterk
- Founded: 1901
- Dissolved: 2004
- Ground: Galgenwaard, Utrecht
Home colours

Voetbalvereniging Door Oefening Sterk, in short VV DOS, was established in 1901. The club won the national championship in 1958. In 1970 its professional branch merged with Velox and USV Elinkwijk to form FC Utrecht. The amateur section continued until 2004 when it merged with USV Holland to form DHC '04.

=== USV Holland (1917–2004) ===
USV Holland, short for Utrechtse Sportvereniging Holland, was founded on 3 December 1917. It played at the Sportpark Thorbecke, Utrecht. From 1992 to 2000 the club played in the Hoofdklasse, at that time the highest amateur league. In 1993 and 1995 it became Sunday amateur champions.

Its last year in the Hoofdklasse started a period of "free fall". USV Holland relegated four consecutive seasons to end in the Vierde Klasse.

=== DHC '04 (2004–2007) ===
On 1 July 2004, USV Holland merged with the amateur section of VV DOS to become DHC '04.

=== DHSC (2007–2024) ===
An additional merger with Stichtse Boys in 2007 formed the DOS-Holland-Stichtse Boys-Combinatie (DHCS). The sites of USV Holland and DOS bordered each other on Thorbeckelaan. After the merger in 2007, both sites were demolished and a new Sportpark Thorbeckelaan was constructed for DHSC in the Ondiep district. This stadium was later renamed Sportpark Wesley Sneijder, after Wesley Sneijder, who grew up in Ondiep and played football at DOS.

In 2020, DHSC garnered attention by signing former professional players Mounir El Hamdaoui and Robert Guerain.

On 21 June 2024, the club's members decided during an extraordinary general meeting to dissolve the club, citing financial problems, administrative chaos, and a significant decline in membership. The dissolution was set to take effect on 24 June 2024. On the same day as the decision, the name of Wesley Sneijder, after whom the club's facility was named, was removed from the clubhouse wall. The removal of Wesley Sneijder's name from the clubhouse wall drew strong criticism. Club representative Ron Berrens called it "unacceptable," while Sneijder described the act as "very sad," attributing it to his decision to distance himself from the club. His brother Rodney also condemned the action on social media, calling it "pathetic."

Subsequently, the club entered liquidation, with a committee tasked with handling financial settlements and determining the future use of the sports complex. No teams were set to participate in the 2024–25 season, and the club became registered in the Kamer van Koophandel (Chamber of Commerce) with the status "in liquidation."

== Managers ==
=== VV DOS ===
- 1944–1949 Jaap van der Leck
- 195X-1957 Louis Pastoor
- 1957–1959 Joseph Gruber
- 1959–1961 Jaap van der Leck
- 1961–1962 Joseph Gruber
- 1962–1964 Wilhelm Kment
- 1964–1965 Arie de Vroet
- 1965–1966 Jovan Jovanovic
- – Tim van der Laan
- 19??-1968 Jan de Lang
- 1968–1969 Friedrich Donnenfeld
- 1969–1970 Laszlo Zalai
