= Pieter Bos =

Dutch footballer

Personal information
- Date of birth: 23 February 1997 (age 29)
- Place of birth: Buitenpost, Netherlands
- Height: 1.93 m (6 ft 4 in)
- Position: Goalkeeper

Youth career
- 2002–2008: Buitenpost
- 2008–2016: Heerenveen

Senior career*
Years	Team	Apps	(Gls)
2016–2022	Cambuur	8	(0)
- * Club domestic league appearances and goals

Pieter Bos (born 23 February 1997) is a Dutch retired footballer who played as a goalkeeper.

== Career ==
Bos began playing football with the youth sides of his local club Buitenpost, before moving to Heerenveen's youth academy in 2008. He signed a professional contract with Cambuur in the Eerste Divisie on 16 June 2016. He made his professional debut with Cambuur in a 2–2 tie with Twente on 3 May 2021, coming on in the 80th minute as the starting goalkeeper Xavier Mous was injured.

The long-term backup goalkeeper for Cambuur, Bos was forced to retire from professional football at the age of 25 on 18 May 2022, as he was diagnosed with a career-ending heart condition.

== Honours ==
Cambuur

- Eerste Divisie: 2020–21
