= Oudshoorn =

Coordinates: 52°08′N 4°40′E

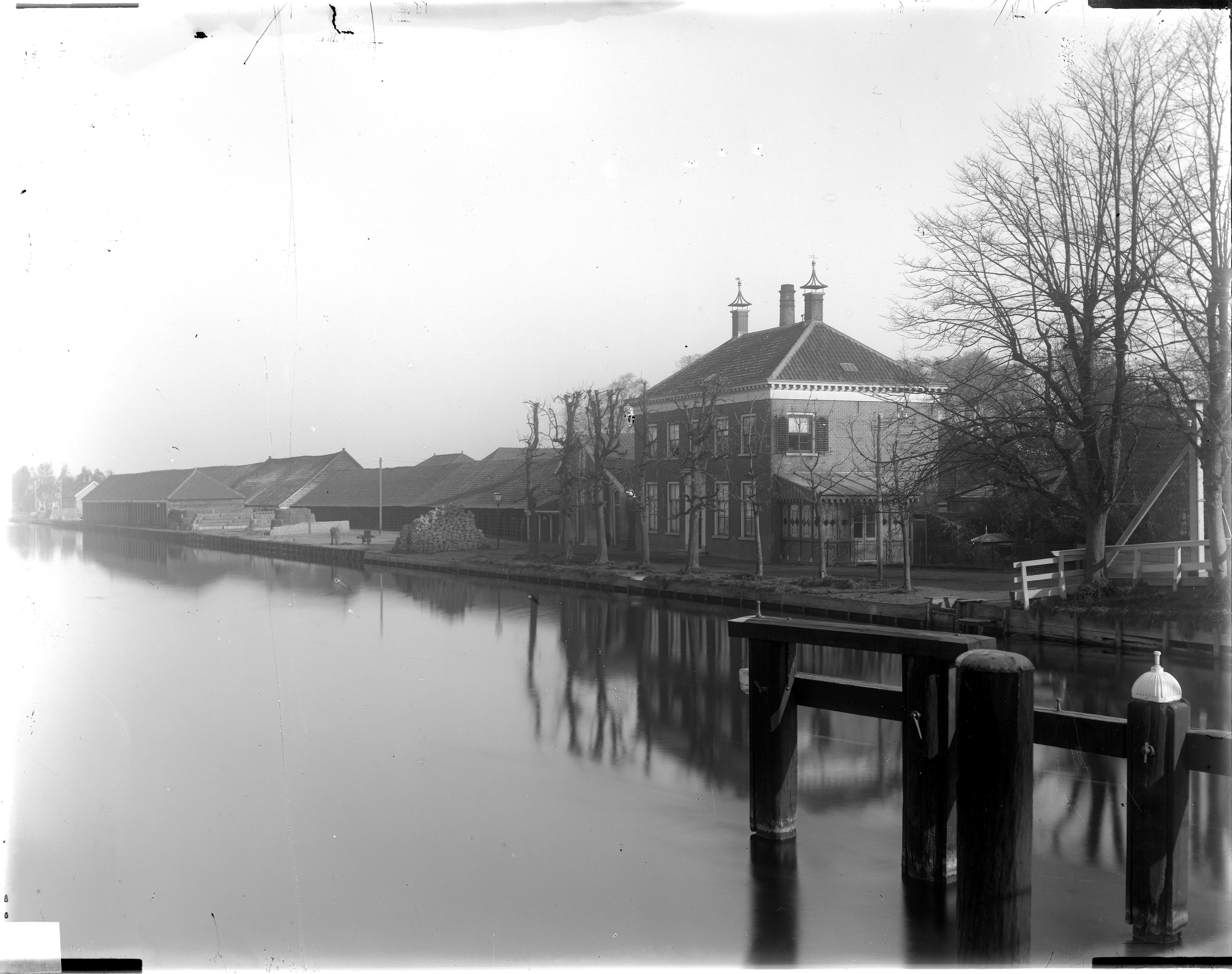
Tile factory along the Rhine in Oudshoorn

Oudshoorn is a former village in the Dutch province of South Holland. It was located on the Oude Rijn, opposite the village of Alphen, with which it merged to form the city of Alphen aan den Rijn.

Oudshoorn was a separate municipality until 1918, when it became part of Alphen aan den Rijn.
