= Karel Kaufman =

Dutch football manager (1898–1977)

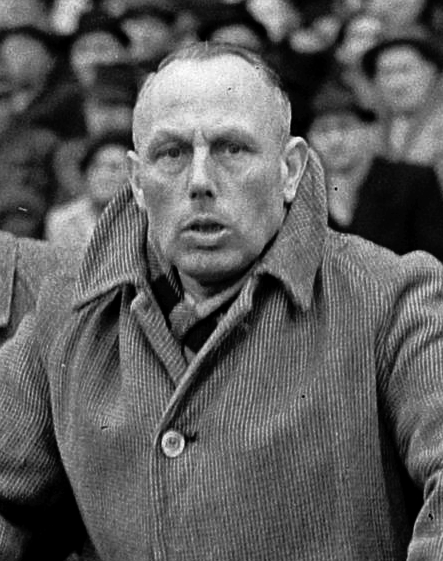
- Kaufman in 1949

Personal information
- Full name: Karel Joseph Kaufman
- Date of birth: 29 April 1898
- Place of birth: Amsterdam, Netherlands
- Date of death: 10 December 1977 (aged 79)
- Place of death: Haarlem, Netherlands

Senior career*
Years	Team	Apps	(Gls)
1916–1934	Achilles 1894		

Managerial career
- 1940: Feyenoord
- 1946: Netherlands
- 1949: Netherlands
- 1954–1955: Netherlands
- * Club domestic league appearances and goals

Karel Joseph Kaufman (20 April 1898 – 10 December 1977) was a Dutch football player and manager who managed Feyenoord in 1940, and the Netherlands national team in three separate spells, in 1946, 1949, and from 1954 to 1955.

As a player, Kaufman played for Achilles 1894 from 1916 to 1934.
