= 2023–24 Almere City FC season =

Almere City FC
2023–24 season
- Manager: Alex Pastoor
- Stadium: Yanmar Stadion
- Eredivisie: 13th
- KNVB Cup: Round of 16
- Top goalscorer: League: Thomas Robinet (11); All: Thomas Robinet (12)
- Highest home attendance: 4,332 (vs. PSV Eindhoven, 23 September 2023; Eredivisie)
- Lowest home attendance: 3,616 (vs. FC Twente, 13 August 2023; Eredivisie)
- Biggest win: 8–1 (vs. OJC Rosmalen (A); 31 October; KNVB Cup)
- Biggest defeat: 1–6 (vs. Feyenoord (A); 27 August 2023; Eredivisie); 0–5 (vs. Heracles (H); 26 November 2023; Eredivisie)
Home colours	Away colours	Third colours

The 2023–24 season was Almere City FC's 23rd season in existence and first ever in the Eredivisie. They competed in the KNVB Cup, reaching the round of 16.

== Players ==
=== First-team squad ===
As of 1 February 2024

Note: Flags indicate national team as defined under FIFA eligibility rules; some limited exceptions apply. Players may hold more than one non-FIFA nationality.

No.	Pos.	Nation	Player
1	GK	NED	Nordin Bakker
2	DF	CUW	Sherel Floranus
3	DF	NED	Joey Jacobs
4	DF	NED	Damian van Bruggen (captain)
5	DF	FRA	Loïc Mbe Soh (on loan from Nottingham Forest)
6	MF	ESP	Álvaro Peña
7	FW	NED	Jason van Duiven (on loan from PSV Eindhoven)
8	MF	NED	Danny Post
9	FW	FRA	Thomas Robinet
11	FW	COD	Yann Kitala (on loan from Le Havre)
14	MF	ESP	Pascu
15	MF	NED	Peer Koopmeiners (on loan from AZ)
16	MF	BIH	Adi Nalić

No.	Pos.	Nation	Player
17	FW	NOR	Kornelius Normann Hansen
18	GK	AUT	Samuel Şahin-Radlinger (on loan from Austria Wien)
19	FW	FRA	Yoann Cathline (on loan from Lorient)
20	DF	NED	Hamdi Akujobi
21	MF	BEL	Milan Corryn
22	DF	FRA	Théo Barbet
24	FW	COM	Faiz Mattoir
25	DF	NED	Christopher Mamengi
26	GK	SUI	Stijn Keller
27	FW	NED	Rajiv van La Parra
28	MF	NED	Stije Resink
36	MF	NED	Marcelencio Esajas
39	MF	NED	Jochem Ritmeester van de Kamp

=== Out on loan ===
Note: Flags indicate national team as defined under FIFA eligibility rules; some limited exceptions apply. Players may hold more than one non-FIFA nationality.

No.	Pos.	Nation	Player
—	DF	NED	Thomas Poll (at Cambuur until 30 June 2024)
—	FW	SUR	Jeredy Hilterman (at Willem II until 30 June 2024)

No.	Pos.	Nation	Player
—	FW	NED	Bradly van Hoeven (at Emmen until 30 June 2024)

== Transfers ==
=== In ===
Pos.	Player	Transferred from	Fee	Date	Source
FW	(France) Yoann Cathline	(France) FC Lorient	Loan		
DF	(Netherlands) Sherel Floranus	(Turkey) Antalyaspor			
FW	(Netherlands) Bradly van Hoeven	(Netherlands) TOP Oss	End of loan		
FW	(Democratic Republic of the Congo) Yann Kitala	(France) Le Havre AC	Loan		
MF	(Netherlands) Peer Koopmeiners	(Netherlands) AZ Alkmaar	Loan		
FW	(Netherlands) Pim Lukassen	(Netherlands) De Graafschap			
DF	(Netherlands) Christopher Mamengi	(Netherlands) FC Utrecht			
DF	(France) Loïc Mbe Soh	(England) Nottingham Forest	Loan		
FW	(France) Thomas Robinet	(Belgium) KV Oostende			
GK	(Austria) Samuel Şahin-Radlinger	Austria Wien	Loan		
FW	(Netherlands) Jason van Duiven	(Netherlands) Jong PSV	Loan	8 January 2024	

=== Out ===
Pos.	Player	Transferred to	Fee	Date	Source
MF	(Netherlands) Ilias Alhaft	(Armenia) FC Noah	Undisclosed	3 August 2023	
GK	(Iran) Agil Etemadi	Retired		June 2023	
DF	(Netherlands) Niciano Grootfaam	Unattached			
FW	(Suriname) Jeredy Hilterman	(Netherlands) Willem II	Loan		
FW	(Belgium) Anthony Limbombe	(Belgium) SK Beveren	Undisclosed	6 September 2023	
DF	(Netherlands) Thomas Poll	(Netherlands) SC Cambuur	Loan (to be transferred on 1 July 2024)		
MF	(Netherlands) Tim Receveur	(Netherlands) FC Dordrecht	Undisclosed		
MF	(Netherlands) Jorrit Smeets	(Netherlands) FC Emmen	Undisclosed		

== Pre-season and friendlies ==
Win Draw Loss

15 July 2023 Friendly	Almere City (Netherlands)	3–0	(Germany) Blau-Weiß Lohne	Almere
15:00 UTC+2	Westerhoff 19' (o.g.); Pascu 33'; van La Parra 58'	Report		Stadium: Yanmar Stadion; Attendance: 1,200

22 July 2023 Friendly	SC Verl (Germany)	0–1	(Netherlands) Almere City	Garderen
15:00 UTC+2		Report	Duijvestijn 22'	Stadium: Sportpark De Westeneng; Attendance: 0

29 July 2023 Friendly	Viktoria Köln (Germany)	2–2	(Netherlands) Almere City	Cologne
14:00 UTC+2	May 2'; Becker 12'	Report	Robinet 48'; Beaumont 69'	Stadium: Sportpark Höhenberg

1 August 2023 Friendly	Willem II (Netherlands)	2–1	(Netherlands) Almere City	Tilburg
13:00 UTC+2	de Waal 24'; Schroijen 82'	Report	Duijvestijn 71'	Stadium: Sportpark Prinsenhoeve; Attendance: 0

5 August 2023 Friendly	K.V. Oostende (Belgium)	2–2	(Netherlands) Almere City	Oostende
16:00 UTC+2	Jung 27'; Van Daele 45+4'	Report	Limbombe 60' (pen.) 75'	Stadium: Diaz Arena

6 January 2024 Friendly	SC Heerenveen (Netherlands)	2–4	(Netherlands) Almere City	Tegelen
13:30 UTC+1	Olsson 88'; van Amersfoort 90'		van La Parra 17'; Kromah 45+2' 45+7'; Pinas 80'	Stadium: Sportpark de Bakenbos; Attendance: 0

20 March 2024 Friendly	Fortuna Düsseldorf (Germany)	0–2	(Netherlands) Almere City	Düsseldorf
12:00 UTC+1			Pascu 15'; Corryn 38'	Stadium: Arena-Sportpark; Attendance: 0 Referee: Lars Aarts

== Competitions ==
=== Overall record ===
Competition	First match	Last match	Starting round	Final position	Record							
Competition	First match	Last match	Starting round	Final position	Pld	W	D	L	GF	GA	GD	Win %
Eredivisie	August 2023	19 May 2024	Matchday 1	13th	34	7	13	14	33	59	−26	20.59
KNVB Cup	31 October 2023	17 January 2024	First round	Round of 16	3	2	0	1	11	4	+7	66.67
Total					37	9	13	15	44	63	−19	24.32

Source: Competitions

=== Eredivisie ===
==== League table ====
Pos	Team	Pld	W	D	L	GF	GA	GD	Pts
11	Heerenveen	34	10	7	17	53	70	−17	37
12	PEC Zwolle	34	9	9	16	45	67	−22	36
13	Almere City	34	7	13	14	33	59	−26	34
14	Heracles Almelo	34	9	6	19	41	74	−33	33
15	RKC Waalwijk	34	7	8	19	38	56	−18	29

Source: Eredivisie
Rules for classification: Season in progress: 1) Most points won; 2) Less points lost; 3) Goal difference; 4) Goals scored; 5) Alphabetical order; End of season: 1) Points; 2) Goal difference; 3) Goals scored; 4) Head-to-head points; 5) Head-to-head goal difference; 6) Head-to-head away goals scored; 7) Play-off if relevant for deciding champion, relegation or participating in a European league, otherwise by draw. 8) Penalty shoot-out (only after a play-off)

==== Results summary ====
Overall								Home						Away					
Pld	W	D	L	GF	GA	GD	Pts	W	D	L	GF	GA	GD	W	D	L	GF	GA	GD
34	7	13	14	33	59	−26	34	3	7	7	18	30	−12	4	6	7	15	29	−14

Source: Soccerway

==== Results by round ====
Round	1	2	3	4	5	6	7	8	9	10	11	12	13	14	15	16	17	18	19	20	21	22	23	24	25	26	27	28	29	30	31	32	33	34
Ground	H	A	A	H	A	H	A	H	A	H	A	H	H	A	A	H	A	H	A	H	H	A	H	A	H	A	H	A	A	H	A	H	A	H
Result	L	L	L	L	D	L	W	W	D	D	W	D	L	L	L	W	W	D	L	W	D	W	L	D	D	D	D	D	D	L	L	D		
Position	16	15	18	17	17	18	16	15	14	15	11	13	14	16	16	14	12	13	14	12	13	11	13	12	12	12	12	12	12	12	13	13		

Updated to match(es) played on September 2023. Source:
A = Away; H = Home; W = Win; D = Draw; L = Loss

==== Matches ====
The league fixtures were unveiled on 30 June 2023.

13 August 2023 1	Almere	1–4	Twente	Almere
16:45 UTC+2	Floranus (yellow card) 27'; Van Bruggen (yellow card) 32' (yellow-red card) 74'; Esajas (yellow card) 69'; Post 72'	Report	Pröpper 59'; Vlap 66'; Van Wolfswinkel 90+2', 90+4'	Stadium: Yanmar Stadion; Referee: Jochem Kamphuis

19 August 2023 2	Fortuna Sittard	2–1	Almere	Sittard
--:-- UTC+2	Akujobi 8' (o.g.); Rosier 24'	Report	Robinet 33'	Stadium: Fortuna Sittard Stadion; Attendance: 8,893; Referee: Jannick van der Laan

27 August 2023 3	Feyenoord	6–1	Almere	Rotterdam
14:30 CEST (UTC+2)	Giménez 4', 65' (pen.); Paixão 10'; Geertruida 19'; Wieffer 50'; Timber 90+4'	Report	Ritmeester van de Kamp 89'	Stadium: De Kuip; Attendance: 47,500; Referee: Bas Nijhuis

2 September 2023 4	Almere	1–2	PEC Zwolle	Almere
	Jacobs 90+1'	Report	van den Berg 4'; Vellios 90+7'	Stadium: Yanmar Stadion; Attendance: 3,824; Referee: Marc Nagtegaal

17 September 2023 5	Excelsior Rotterdam	0–0	Almere	Rotterdam
14:30 CEST		Report		Stadium: Van Donge & De Roo Stadion; Attendance: 4,400; Referee: Martin van den Kerkhof

23 September 2023 6	Almere	0–4	PSV Eindhoven	Almere
20:00 CEST (UTC+2)	Akujobi (yellow card) 28'	Report	Til 26'; Lozano 42'; Veerman 66'; Boscagli (yellow card) 77'; Pepi 90+3'	Stadium: Yanmar Stadion; Attendance: 4,332; Referee: Alex Bos

30 September 2023 7	FC Utrecht	0–2	Almere City	Utrecht
18:45 CEST (UTC+2)	Flamingo (yellow card) 38'; Novoa (yellow card) 60' (yellow-red card) 63'; Fraulo (yellow card) 89'	Report	Van Bruggen (yellow card) 22'; Mbe Soh (yellow card) 26'; Kitala (yellow card) 45+3'; Robinet 80'; Van La Parra 89'; Koopmeiners (yellow card) 90+1'	Stadium: Stadion Galgenwaard; Attendance: 22,177; Referee: Edwin van de Graaf

7 October 2023 8	Almere	1–0	RKC Waalwijk	Almere
	Robinet 32'	Report		Stadium: Yanmar Stadion; Attendance: 4,228; Referee: Jeroen Manschot

21 October 2023 9	NEC Nijmegen	1–1	Almere	Nijmegen
	Mattsson 69'	Report	Kitala 35'	Stadium: Goffertstadion; Attendance: 12,500; Referee: Danny Makkelie

28 October 2023 10	Almere	0–0	Go Ahead Eagles	Almere
		Report		Stadium: Yanmar Stadion; Attendance: 4,222; Referee: Serdar Gözübüyük

5 November 2023 11	Sparta Rotterdam	1-2	Almere	Rotterdam
16:45 UTC+1	Kitolano 84'	Report	Robinet 12'; Hansen 76'	Stadium: Sparta Stadion Het Kasteel; Attendance: 10,132; Referee: Allard Lindhout

12 November 2023 12	Almere	2−2	AFC Ajax	Almere
14:30 CET (UTC+1)	Jacobs (yellow card) 7'; Van Bruggen (yellow card) 15'; Robinet (yellow card) 15', (goal) 90+3' (pen.); Ritmeester van de Kamp 67'; Resink (yellow card) 75'; Koopmeiners (yellow card) 90+5'	Report	Brobbey (yellow card) 15'; Akpom 68'; Tahirović 82'; Rensch (yellow card) 90+1'	Stadium: Yanmar Stadion; Referee: Bas Nijhuis

26 November 2023 13	Almere	0−5	Heracles Almelo	Almere
12:30 CET (UTC+1)		Report	Sankoh 4' 64' 87'; Roosken (yellow card) 19'; Ouahim (yellow card) 62'; Nankishi 71' 78'; Wieckhoff (yellow card) 90+1'	Stadium: Yanmar Stadion; Attendance: 4,222; Referee: Jannick van der Laan

1 December 2023 14	SC Heerenveen	3−0	Almere	Heerenveen
20:00 CET (UTC+1)	Pelle van Amersfoort 15' 70'; van Beek 39'; Haye (yellow card) 68'	Report	Royo (yellow card) 39'; Van Bruggen (yellow card) 43'	Stadium: Abe Lenstra Stadion; Attendance: 20,555; Referee: Richard Martens

9 December 2023 15	AZ Alkmaar	4–1	Almere	Alkmaar
21:00 UTC+1	Pavlidis 7', 90+2'; De Wit 66'; Møller Wolfe 80'	Report	Mbe Soh 56'	Stadium: AFAS Stadion; Attendance: 18,429; Referee: Sander van der Eijk

17 December 2023 16	Almere	5–0	Vitesse Arnhem	Almere
12:15 UTC+1	Cathline 28'; Kitala 43'; Jacobs 82'; Peña 87'; Robinet 90+4' (pen.)	Report		Stadium: Yanmar Stadion; Referee: Dannie Makkelie

14 January 2024 17	FC Volendam	0–1	Almere	Volendam
12:15 CET (UTC+1)	Cox (yellow card) 78'	Report	Robinet 12'; Floranus (yellow card) 78'	Stadium: Kras Stadion; Attendance: 6,738; Referee: Ingmar Oostrom

24 January 2024 18	Almere	0–0	Fortuna Sittard	Almere
17:45 UTC+1	van La Parra (yellow card) 83'	Report	Siovas (yellow card) 83'; Barbet (yellow card) 84'	Stadium: Yanmar Stadion; Attendance: 4,122; Referee: Jeroen Manschot
Note: Fixture was postponed from Jan. 20 to Jan. 24 due to bad pitch condition.

27 January 2024 19	PSV Eindhoven	2–0	Almere	Eindhoven
12:15 CET (UTC+1)	De Jong 45', 63' (pen.)	Report	Floranus (yellow card) 5'; Peña (yellow card) 40'	Stadium: Philips Stadion; Referee: Rob Dieperink

2 February 2024 20	Almere	2−1	Excelsior Rotterdam	Almere
	Resink 43'; Widell 68' (o.g.)	Report	Parrott 26'	Stadium: Yanmar Stadion; Referee: Robin Hensgens

10 February 2024 21	Almere	0–0	AZ Alkmaar	Almere
20:00 UTC+1		Report		Stadium: Yanmar Stadion; Referee: A. Bos

17 February 2024 22	PEC Zwolle	0–1	Almere	Zwolle
21:00 UTC+1		Report	Robinet 69'	Stadium: MAC³PARK Stadion; Attendance: 13,714; Referee: Martijn Vos

25 February 2024 23	Almere	0–2	Feyenoord	Almere
14:30 CET (UTC+1)		Report	77', 90+2' Minteh	Stadium: Yanmar Stadion; Attendance: 4,223; Referee: Edwin van de Graaf

3 March 2024 24	Heracles Almelo	2–2	Almere	Almelo
20:00 CET (UTC+1)	Hornkamp 48' (pen.); Hrustic 65'	Report	Cathline 19'; Robinet 35' (pen.)	Stadium: Erve Asito; Attendance: 11,381; Referee: Dennis Higler

9 March 2024 25	Almere	1–1	FC Utrecht	Almere
20:00 CET (UTC+1)	Cathline 3'	Report	Lammers 14'	Stadium: Yanmar Stadion; Referee: Jannick van der Laan

16 March 2024 26	Vitesse	1–1	Almere	Arnhem
18:45 CET (UTC+1)	Hadj Moussa 87'	Report	Hansen 19'	Stadium: GelreDome; Referee: Erwin Blank

31 March 2024 27	Almere	1–1	FC Volendam	Almere
16:45 CEST (UTC+2)	Nalić 71'	Report	Muhren 90+4'	Stadium: Yanmar Stadion; Attendance: 4,222; Referee: Joey Kooij

3 April 2024 28	RKC Waalwijk	0–0	Almere	Waalwijk
20:00 CEST (UTC+2)		Report		Stadium: Mandemakers Stadion; Attendance: 6,173; Referee: Martin van den Kerkhof

7 April 2024 29	Go Ahead Eagles	1–1	Almere	Deventer
14:30 CEST (UTC+2)	Edvardsen 11'	Report	Robinet 23'	Stadium: De Adelaarshorst; Attendance: 9,827; Referee: Bas Nijhuis

13 April 2024 30	Almere	2–3	Sparta Rotterdam	Almere
21:00 CEST (UTC+2)	Cathline 5'; Robinet 87'	Report	Lauritsen 19'; van der Kust 28'; Verschueren 88'	Stadium: Yanmar Stadion; Referee: Alex Bos

24 April 2024 31	FC Twente	3–1	Almere	Enschede
18:45 CEST (UTC+2)	Kjølø 10'; Regeer (yellow card) 19'; Steijk 52'; Rots 84'	Report	Akujobi (yellow card) 29'; Hansen 73'	Stadium: De Grolsch Veste; Referee: Ingmar Oostrom

03 May 2024 32	Almere	1–1	SC Heerenveen	Almere
20:00 CEST (UTC+2)	Hansen 47'; Resink (yellow card) 77'; Cathline (yellow card) 87'; Koopmeiners (red card) 90+1'	Report	Sahraoui 80'	Stadium: Yanmar Stadion; Attendance: 4,222; Referee: Martijn Vos

12 May 2024 33	Ajax	3–0	Almere	Amsterdam
16:45 CEST (UTC+2)	Mannsverk (yellow card) 26'; Bergwijn 29', 34', 38'; Kaplan (yellow card) 45+3'; Hato (yellow card) 62'	Report	Akujobi (yellow card) 10'; Van Bruggen (yellow card) 52'	Stadium: Johan Cruyff Arena; Attendance: 54,697; Referee: Danny Makkelie

19 May 2024 34	Almere	1–4	NEC Nijmegen	Almere
14:30 CEST (UTC+2)	van La Parra 19'; Resink (yellow card) 21'	Report	Sano 32'; Proper 45+2'; Ogawa 63'; Chery 80'	Stadium: Yanmar Stadion; Attendance: 4,222; Referee: Edwin van de Graaf

=== KNVB Cup ===
31 October 2023 First round	OJC Rosmalen	1–8	Almere	Rosmalen
20:00 CET	Hassan 26'	Report	Hansen 4', 16', 50'; Robinet 41'; Royo 55'; Cathline 63'; Duijvestijn 84'; Corryn 89'	Stadium: Sportpark De Groote Wielen

21 December 2023 Second round	VV Katwijk	1–2	Almere	Katwijk
20:00 CET (UTC+1)	Doesburg 16'	Report	(yellow card) 18' (yellow-red card) 24' Peña; 28' Cathline; 39' Hansen	Stadium: Sportpark De Krom; Referee: Nick Smit

17 January 2024 Round of 16	Almere	1–2	Fortuna Sittard	Almere
20:00 CET	Hansen 90+2'	Report	Sierhuis 25', 42'	Stadium: Yanmar Stadion; Attendance: 3,513; Referee: Allard Lindhout
