= 2022–23 Almere City FC season =

Almere City FC
2022–23 season
- Chairman: John Bes
- Manager: Alex Pastoor
- Stadium: Yanmar Stadion
- Eerste Divisie: 3rd
- Play-offs: Winners (promoted)
- KNVB Cup: Sixth round
- Top goalscorer: League: Jeredy Hilterman (14); All: Jeredy Hilterman (14)
- Biggest win: TOP Oss 0–5 Almere City
- Biggest defeat: Almere City 0–4 NEC

The 2022–23 season was Almere City FC's 22nd season in the existence and the club's 18th consecutive season in the Eerste Divisie, the second division of Dutch football. The club participated also in the KNVB Cup. The season spans a period between 1 July 2022 and 30 June 2023.

== First-team squad ==
As of 11 February 2023

Note: Flags indicate national team as defined under FIFA eligibility rules; some limited exceptions apply. Players may hold more than one non-FIFA nationality.

No.	Pos.	Nation	Player
1	GK	NED	Nordin Bakker
3	DF	NED	Joey Jacobs
4	DF	NED	Damian van Bruggen (captain)
5	DF	NED	Thomas Poll
7	FW	BEL	Anthony Limbombe
8	MF	NED	Danny Post
9	FW	SUR	Jeredy Hilterman
10	MF	NED	Lance Duijvestijn
11	FW	NED	Ilias Alhaft
14	DF	ESP	Pascu
17	FW	NOR	Kornelius Normann Hansen
18	MF	ESP	Álvaro Peña
19	FW	NED	Maarten Pouwels
20	DF	NED	Hamdi Akujobi
22	DF	FRA	Théo Barbet

No.	Pos.	Nation	Player
23	DF	ESP	Manel Royo
24	MF	COM	Faiz Mattoir
25	MF	NED	Jorrit Smeets
26	GK	SUI	Stijn Keller
28	MF	NED	Stije Resink
32	FW	NED	Jeffry Puriel
34	FW	NED	Tijmen Wildeboer
35	DF	NED	Jordy Rullens
36	MF	NED	Marcelencio Esajas
37	FW	NED	Layee Kromah
38	DF	NED	Jaden Pinas
39	MF	NED	Jochem Ritmeester van de Kamp
40	GK	IRI	Agil Etemadi
46	DF	NED	Niciano Grootfaam
—	MF	BEL	Milan Corryn

=== Out on loan ===
Note: Flags indicate national team as defined under FIFA eligibility rules; some limited exceptions apply. Players may hold more than one non-FIFA nationality.

No. / Pos. / Nation / Player; — / MF / NED / Tim Receveur (at FC Dordrecht until 30 June 2023)	No. / Pos. / Nation / Player; — / FW / NED / Bradly van Hoeven (at TOP Oss until 30 June 2023)

== Pre-season and friendlies ==
Win Draw Loss Fixtures

31 July 2022 Friendly	Almere City (Netherlands)	1–1	(Netherlands) Ajax	Almere
14:00 CEST (UTC+2)	Jacobs 47'		Brobbey 35'	Stadium: Yanmar Stadion

3 December 2022 Friendly	Almere City (Netherlands)	1–1	(Netherlands) FC Twente	Almere
13:00 CET (UTC+1)				Stadium: Yanmar Stadion

30 December 2022 Friendly	FC Groningen (Netherlands)	0–2	(Netherlands) Almere City	Groningen
14:00 CET (UTC+1)				Stadium: Sportpark Corpus den Hoorn

23 March 2023 Friendly	RKC Waalwijk (Netherlands)	0–6	(Netherlands) Almere City	Waalwijk
13:00 CET (UTC+1)				Stadium: Mandemakers Stadion

== Competitions ==
=== Overall record ===
Competition	First match	Last match	Starting round	Final position	Record							
Competition	First match	Last match	Starting round	Final position	Pld	W	D	L	GF	GA	GD	Win %
Eerste Divisie	5 August 2022	12 February 2023	Matchday 1	3rd	38	21	7	10	58	41	+17	55.26
Eerste Divisie play-offs	22 May 2023	11 June 2023	First round	Winners	6	3	2	1	9	5	+4	50.00
KNVB Cup	18 October 2022	11 January 2023	Fifth round	Sixth round	2	1	0	1	2	4	−2	50.00
Total					46	25	9	12	69	50	+19	54.35

Source: Soccerway

=== Eerste Divisie ===
==== League table ====
Pos	Team	Pld	W	D	L	GF	GA	GD	Pts	Promotion or qualification
1	Heracles Almelo (Note: Winner of the First and Fourth Period (Rounds 1–10 and 29–38)) (C, P)	38	27	4	7	103	42	+61	85	Promotion to the Eredivisie
2	PEC Zwolle (Note: Winner of the Second Period (Rounds 11–19)) (P)	38	27	4	7	99	43	+56	85	Promotion to the Eredivisie
3	Almere City (Note: Winner of the Third Period (Rounds 20–28)) (O, P)	38	21	7	10	58	41	+17	70	Qualification for promotion play-offs
4	Willem II	38	19	11	8	68	40	+28	68	Qualification for promotion play-offs
5	MVV Maastricht	38	18	5	15	65	65	0	59	Qualification for promotion play-offs

Source: Soccerway, Keuken Kampioen Divisie (in Dutch)
Rules for classification: Season in progress: 1) Most points won; 2) Less points lost; 3) Goal difference; 4) Goals scored; 5) Alphabetical order; End of season: 1) Points; 2) Goal difference; 3) Goals scored; 4) Head-to-head points; 5) Head-to-head goal difference; 6) Head-to-head away goals scored; 7) Play-off if relevant for deciding champion, relegation or participating in a European league, otherwise by draw. 8) Penalty shoot-out (only after a play-off)
(C) Champions; (O) Play-off winners; (P) Promoted

==== Results summary ====
Overall								Home						Away					
Pld	W	D	L	GF	GA	GD	Pts	W	D	L	GF	GA	GD	W	D	L	GF	GA	GD
38	21	7	10	58	41	+17	70	10	4	5	29	21	+8	11	3	5	29	20	+9

Source: Keuken Kampioen Divisie

==== Results by round ====
Round	1	2	3	4	5	6	7	8	9	10	11	12	13	14	15	16	17	18	19	20	21	22	23	24	25	26	27	28	29	30	31	32	33	34	35	36	37	38
Ground	A	H	A	H	A	H	A	H	H	A	H	A	H	A	H	A	H	A	A	H	H	A	H	A	H	A	A	H	A	H	A	H	A	H	A	H	A	H
Result	L	W	L	W	L	L	W	D	W	W	L	D	W	W	W	L	W	W	L	W	D	W	L	W	D	W	W	W	W	L	D	W	W	D	W	L	D	W
Position																																						

Source: Keuken Kampioen Divisie
A = Away; H = Home; W = Win; D = Draw; L = Loss

==== Matches ====
The league fixtures were announced on 17 June 2022.

5 August 2022 1	VVV-Venlo	3–0	Almere City	Venlo
CET (UTC+1)

12 August 2022 2	Almere City	3–0	TOP Oss	Almere
CET (UTC+1)				Stadium: Yanmar Stadion

22 August 2022 3	Jong AZ	3–2	Almere City	Alkmaar
CET (UTC+1)

26 August 2022 4	Almere City	2–0	Den Bosch	Almere
CET (UTC+1)				Stadium: Yanmar Stadion

2 September 2022 5	Helmond Sport	3–0	Almere City	Helmond
CET (UTC+1)

9 September 2022 6	Almere City	0–1	Telstar	Almere
CET (UTC+1)				Stadium: Yanmar Stadion

16 September 2022 7	De Graafschap	1–2	Almere City	Doetinchem
CET (UTC+1)

12 September 2022 8	Almere City	1–1	FC Eindhoven	Almere
CET (UTC+1)				Stadium: Yanmar Stadion

30 September 2022 9	Almere City	2–1	Roda JC	Almere
CET (UTC+1)				Stadium: Yanmar Stadion

7 October 2022 10	Jong Utrecht	0–2	Almere City	Utrecht
CET (UTC+1)

14 October 2022 11	Almere City	2–3	Jong Ajax	Almere
CET (UTC+1)				Stadium: Yanmar Stadion

21 October 2022 12	Willem II	1–1	Almere City
CET (UTC+1)

28 October 2022 13	Almere City	3–2	Heracles Almelo	Almere
CET (UTC+1)				Stadium: Yanmar Stadion

7 November 2022 14	Jong PSV	0–1	Almere City	Eindhoven
CET (UTC+1)

13 November 2022 15	Almere City	2–1	Dordrecht	Almere
CET (UTC+1)				Stadium: Yanmar Stadion

19 November 2022 16	MVV Maastricht	1–0	Almere City	Maastricht
CET (UTC+1)

11 December 2022 17	Almere City	4–1	ADO Den Haag	Almere
CET (UTC+1)				Stadium: Yanmar Stadion

16 December 2022 18	NAC Breda	0–1	Almere City	Breda
CET (UTC+1)

6 January 2023 19	PEC Zwolle	3–2	Almere City	Zwolle
CET (UTC+1)

15 January 2023 20	Almere City	1–0	Willem II	Almere
CET (UTC+1)				Stadium: Yanmar Stadion

20 January 2023 21	Almere City	2–2	De Graafschap	Almere
CET (UTC+1)				Stadium: Yanmar Stadion

27 January 2023 22	Telstar	0–1	Almere City	Velsen
CET (UTC+1)

3 February 2023 23	Almere City	1–2	Jong PSV	Almere
CET (UTC+1)				Stadium: Yanmar Stadion

10 February 2023 24	FC Eindhoven	0–1	Almere City	Eindhoven
CET (UTC+1)				Stadium: Jan Louwers Stadion

17 February 2023 25	Almere City	0–0	Helmond Sport	Almere
CET (UTC+1)				Stadium: Yanmar Stadion

24 February 2023 26	Roda JC	0–2	Almere City	Kerkrade
CET (UTC+1)				Stadium: Parkstad Limburg Stadion

3 March 2023 27	Dordrecht	0–1	Almere City	Dordrecht
CET (UTC+1)				Stadium: Matchoholic Stadion

13 March 2023 30	Almere City	1–3	VVV-Venlo	Almere
CET (UTC+1)				Stadium: Yanmar Stadion

17 March 2023 29	Jong Ajax	0–2	Almere City	Amsterdam
CET (UTC+1)				Stadium: Sportpark De Toekomst

31 March 2023 31	Heracles Almelo	1–1	Almere City	Almelo
CEST (UTC+2)				Stadium: Erve Asito

3 April 2023 28	Almere City	1–0	Jong Utrecht	Almere
20:00 CEST (UTC+2)	Van Bruggen 87'	Report		Stadium: Yanmar Stadion; Referee: Rob Dieperink

7 April 2023 32	Almere City	2–1	Jong AZ	Almere
20:00 CEST (UTC+2)	Akujobi 38'; Resink 42'	Report	Barası 28'	Stadium: Yanmar Stadion; Referee: Wouter Wiersma

16 April 2023 33	ADO Den Haag	2–3	Almere City	The Hague
12:15 CEST (UTC+2)	Verheydt 7'; Thomas 12'	Report	Hansen 35'; Akujobi 46'; Duijvestijn 64'	Stadium: Bingoal Stadion; Referee: Danny Makkelie

21 April 2023 33	Almere City	1–1	PEC Zwolle	Almere
20:00 CEST (UTC+2)	Resink 71'	Report	Van den Belt 74'	Stadium: Yanmar Stadion; Referee: Jochem Kamphuis

28 April 2023 35	TOP Oss	0–5	Almere City	Oss
20:00 CEST (UTC+2)		Report	Duijvestijn (penalty missed) 10'; Limbombe 32', 43'; Peña 61'; Van La Parra 80'; Hilterman 89' (pen.)	Stadium: Frans Heesen Stadion; Referee: Marc Nagtegaal

7 May 2023 36	Almere City	0–2	NAC Breda	Almere
12:15 CEST (UTC+2)		Report	Agougil 30'; Ómarsson 35'; Agougil (red card) 58'	Stadium: Yanmar Stadion; Referee: Edwin van de Graaf

12 May 2023 37	Den Bosch	2–2	Almere City	's-Hertogenbosch
20:00 CEST (UTC+2)				Stadium: De Vliert; Referee: Luuk Timmer

19 May 2023 38	Almere City	1–0	MVV Maastricht	Almere
20:00 CEST (UTC+2)	Peña 75'			Stadium: Yanmar Stadion; Referee: Martin Perez

==== Promotion play-offs ====
22 May 2023 First round First leg	Eindhoven	1–0	Almere City	Eindhoven
20:00 CEST (UTC+2)	Dorenbosch 76'	Report		Stadium: Jan Louwers Stadion; Attendance: 3,518; Referee: Jannick van der Laan

26 May 2023 First round Second leg	Almere City	3–1 (a.e.t.) (3–2 agg.)	Eindhoven	Almere
20:00 CEST (UTC+2)	Hilterman 80'; Limbombe 90+4'; Van La Parra 109'	Report	84' (pen.) Amevor	Stadium: Yanmar Stadion; Attendance: 3,622; Referee: Marc Nagtegaal

30 May 2023 Semifinals; First leg	VVV-Venlo	1–1	Almere City	Venlo
20:00 CEST (UTC+2)	Van Rooijen 7'	Report	Limbombe 29'	Stadium: De Koel; Attendance: 7,201; Referee: Martin van den Kerkhof

3 June 2023 Semifinals; Second leg	Almere City	1–1 (a.e.t.) (2–2 agg.) (2–0 p)	VVV-Venlo	Almere
16:30 CEST (UTC+2)	Duijvestijn 50'	Report	Allouch 62'	Stadium: Yanmar Stadion; Attendance: 4,019; Referee: Edwin van de Graaf
	Penalties
	Van La Parra (penalty missed); Alhaft (penalty missed); Duijvestijn (penalty scored); Peña (penalty scored)		(penalty missed) Venema; (penalty missed) Allouch; (penalty missed) Koglin; (penalty missed) De Boer

6 June 2023 Final; First leg	Almere City	2–0	Emmen	Almere
20:00 CEST (UTC+2)		Report		Stadium: Yanmar Stadion

11 June 2023 Final; Second leg	Emmen	1–2 (1–4 agg.)	Almere City	Emmen
18:00 CEST (UTC+2)	Vlak 58'	Report	Van La Parra 50'; Smeets 53'	Stadium: De Oude Meerdijk; Referee: Allard Lindhout

=== KNVB Cup ===
18 October 2022 First round	Almere City	2–0	TOP Oss	Almere
20:00 CEST (UTC+2)	Poll 64'; Duijvestijn 70'	Report		Stadium: Yanmar Stadion

11 January 2023 Second round	Almere City	0–4	NEC	Almere
20:00 CET (UTC+1)		Report	Tannane 5'; Tavşan 43'; Marques 63'; Musaba 80'	Stadium: Yanmar Stadion; Referee: Marc Nagtegaal
