= List of Dutch football transfers summer 2024 =

This is a list of Dutch football transfers for the 2024 summer transfer window. Only transfers featuring Eredivisie are listed.

== Eredivisie ==
Note: Flags indicate national team as has been defined under FIFA eligibility rules. Players may hold more than one non-FIFA nationality.

=== Ajax ===
In:

No.	Pos.	Nation	Player
20	FW	BFA	Bertrand Traoré (from (Spain) Villarreal)
25	FW	NED	Wout Weghorst (from (England) Burnley)
26	DF	ITA	Daniele Rugani (on loan from (Italy) Juventus)

Out:

No.	Pos.	Nation	Player
1	GK	ARG	Gerónimo Rulli (to (France) Marseille)
7	FW	NED	Steven Bergwijn (to (Saudi Arabia) Al-Ittihad)
11	FW	POR	Carlos Forbs (on loan to (England) Wolverhampton Wanderers)
18	DF	CRO	Jakov Medić (on loan to (Germany) VfL Bochum)
24	MF	NED	Silvano Vos (to (Italy) Milan Futuro)
25	DF	CRO	Borna Sosa (on loan to (Italy) Torino)
—	FW	GEO	Georges Mikautadze (to (France) Metz, previously on loan)
—	FW	POR	Francisco Conceição (to (Portugal) Porto, previously on loan)
—	DF	MEX	Jorge Sánchez (to (Mexico) Cruz Azul, previously on loan at (Portugal) Porto)
—	FW	TUR	Naci Ünüvar (on loan to (Spain) Espanyol, previously on loan at Twente)

=== Almere City ===
In:

No.	Pos.	Nation	Player
2	DF	SUR	Damil Dankerlui (from (Greece) Panserraikos)
4	DF	ESP	Ricardo Visus (on loan from (Spain) Real Betis)
6	MF	ESP	Álex Carbonell (from (Spain) Amorebieta)
7	FW	FRA	Ruben Providence (from (Austria) Hartberg)
8	MF	MAR	Anas Tahiri (free agent)
11	FW	FRA	Junior Kadile (from (France) Laval)
14	DF	GRE	Vasilios Zagaritis (from (Italy) Parma)
15	DF	WAL	James Lawrence (from (Germany) 1. FC Nürnberg)
21	FW	BEL	Baptiste Guillaume (from (France) Guingamp)
23	MF	GEQ	Álex Balboa (from (Spain) Deportivo Alavés, previously on loan at (Spain) Huesca)
27	FW	FRA	Logan Delaurier-Chaubet (from (France) Bordeaux, previously on loan at (France) Quevilly-Rouen)
29	GK	AUT	Jonas Wendlinger (from (Austria) Ried)
30	DF	NED	Jay Kuiper (from Groningen)

Out:

No.	Pos.	Nation	Player
2	DF	CUW	Sherel Floranus (to PEC Zwolle)
4	DF	NED	Damian van Bruggen (to (Denmark) Vejle)
6	MF	ESP	Álvaro Peña (to (Spain) Andorra)
8	MF	NED	Danny Post (retired)
14	MF	ESP	Pascu (to (Spain) Arenteiro)
21	MF	BEL	Milan Corryn (to (Slovakia) Spartak Trnava)
27	FW	NED	Rajiv van La Parra (free agent)
28	MF	NED	Stije Resink (to Groningen)
36	MF	NED	Marcelencio Esajas (to TOP Oss)
—	DF	NED	Thomas Poll (to Cambuur, previously on loan)
—	FW	SUR	Jeredy Hilterman (to (Germany) Arminia Bielefeld, previously on loan at Willem II)
—	FW	NED	Bradly van Hoeven (free agent, previously on loan at Emmen)

=== AZ ===
In:

No.	Pos.	Nation	Player
9	FW	IRL	Troy Parrott (from (England) Tottenham Hotspur, previously on loan at Excelsior)
16	DF	JPN	Seiya Maikuma (from (Japan) Cerezo Osaka)
41	GK	NED	Jeroen Zoet (from (Italy) Spezia)

Out:

No.	Pos.	Nation	Player
1	GK	AUS	Mathew Ryan (to (Italy) Roma)
2	DF	JPN	Yukinari Sugawara (to (England) Southampton)
9	FW	GRE	Vangelis Pavlidis (to (Portugal) Benfica)
10	MF	NED	Dani de Wit (to (Germany) VfL Bochum)
19	FW	NED	Myron van Brederode (on loan to (Germany) Fortuna Düsseldorf)
—	GK	DEN	Peter Vindahl Jensen (to (Czech Republic) Sparta Prague, previously on loan)
—	FW	DEN	Jens Odgaard (to (Italy) Bologna, previously on loan)
—	MF	NED	Kenzo Goudmijn (to (England) Derby County, previously on loan at Excelsior)

=== Feyenoord ===
In:

No.	Pos.	Nation	Player
4	MF	KOR	Hwang In-beom (from (Serbia) Red Star Belgrade)
5	DF	NED	Gijs Smal (from Twente)
15	DF	URU	Facundo González (on loan from (Italy) Juventus, previously on loan at (Italy) Sampdoria)
16	DF	ESP	Hugo Bueno (on loan from (England) Wolverhampton Wanderers)
19	FW	ARG	Julián Carranza (from (United States) Philadelphia Union)
20	DF	CRC	Jeyland Mitchell (from (Costa Rica) Alajuelense)
21	GK	BUL	Plamen Andreev (from (Bulgaria) Levski Sofia)
23	FW	ALG	Anis Hadj Moussa (from (Belgium) Patro Eisden, previously on loan at Vitesse)
30	DF	SUI	Jordan Lotomba (from (France) Nice)
32	FW	CZE	Ondřej Lingr (from (Czech Republic) Slavia Prague, previously on loan)
34	MF	CIV	Chris-Kévin Nadje (from (France) Versailles)
38	FW	GHA	Ibrahim Osman (on loan from (England) Brighton & Hove Albion)
—	FW	NED	Devin Haen (from De Graafschap)

Out:

No.	Pos.	Nation	Player
4	DF	NED	Lutsharel Geertruida (to (Germany) RB Leipzig)
7	FW	IRI	Alireza Jahanbakhsh (free agent)
15	DF	PER	Marcos López (on loan to (Denmark) Copenhagen)
16	MF	NED	Thomas van den Belt (on loan to (Spain) Castellón)
20	MF	NED	Mats Wieffer (to (England) Brighton)
25	FW	SVK	Leo Sauer (on loan to NAC Breda)
28	DF	NED	Neraysho Kasanwirjo (on loan to (Scotland) Rangers)
31	GK	GRE	Kostas Lamprou (free agent)
32	FW	CZE	Ondřej Lingr (to (Czech Republic) Slavia Prague)
39	GK	NED	Mikki van Sas (on loan to Vitesse)
—	DF	NED	Mimeirhel Benita (on loan to Heracles Almelo, previously on loan at Excelsior)
—	DF	NED	Ramon Hendriks (to (Germany) VfB Stuttgart, previously on loan at Vitesse)
—	FW	NED	Devin Haen (on loan to Dordrecht)
—	GK	NED	Thijs Jansen (to Cambuur, previously on loan at De Graafschap)
—	MF	NED	Lennard Hartjes (to Excelsior, previously on loan)
—	FW	MAR	Ilias Sebaoui (on loan to SC Heerenveen, previously on loan at Dordrecht)
—	DF	NOR	Marcus Holmgren Pedersen (on loan to (Italy) Torino, previously on loan at (Italy) Sassuolo)
—	DF	BEL	Antef Tsoungui (on loan to (Belgium) OH Leuven, previously on loan at Dordrecht)
—	FW	SWE	Patrik Wålemark (on loan to (Poland) Lech Poznań, previously on loan at Heerenveen)
—	MF	ARG	Ezequiel Bullaude (on loan to Fortuna Sittard, previously on loan at (Germany) Boca Juniors)

=== Fortuna Sittard ===
In:

No.	Pos.	Nation	Player
4	DF	BEL	Shawn Adewoye (from RKC Waalwijk)
5	DF	AUT	Darijo Grujcic (from Austria Lustenau)
6	DF	NED	Syb van Ottele (from SC Heerenveen)
8	MF	NED	Jasper Dahlhaus (from FC Eindhoven)
11	FW	FRA	Makan Aïko (from (France) Le Mans)
17	FW	TUR	Onur Demir (from (Turkey) Alanyaspor)
22	MF	COD	Samuel Bastien (from (England) Burnley, previously on loan at (Turkey) Kasımpaşa)
28	FW	CRO	Josip Mitrović (from (Croatia) Gorica)
31	GK	NED	Mattijs Branderhorst (on loan from Utrecht)
50	FW	CRO	Ante Erceg (free agent)
77	MF	BIH	Luka Tunjić (from (Germany) Holstein Kiel)
80	MF	SUI	Ryan Fosso (from (Liechtenstein) Vaduz)
—	DF	NED	Robyn Esajas (from ADO Den Haag)
—	MF	ARG	Ezequiel Bullaude (on loan from Feyenoord)

Out:

No.	Pos.	Nation	Player
6	MF	CPV	Deroy Duarte (to (Bulgaria) Ludogorets Razgrad)
7	FW	ESP	Iñigo Córdoba (to (Spain) Burgos)
15	MF	TUR	Oğuzhan Özyakup (retired)
19	MF	KOS	Arianit Ferati (free agent)
20	FW	ALG	Mouhamed Belkheir (on loan to (Belgium) La Louvière)
22	GK	NED	Tom Hendriks (to Helmond Sport)
24	DF	CUW	Nathangelo Markelo (to Roda JC)
33	DF	GRE	Dimitrios Siovas (free agent)
61	DF	MAD	Rémy Vita (on loan to (France) Amiens)
—	FW	TUR	Tunahan Taşçı (to (Turkey) Konyaspor, previously on loan at MVV Maastricht)
—	DF	NED	Robyn Esajas (on loan to MVV Maastricht)
—	GK	NED	Michael Verrips (to (Belgium) Dender, previously on loan at Groningen)
—	FW	BEL	Milan Robberechts (on loan to (Belgium) RSCA Futures, previously on loan at VVV-Venlo)

=== Go Ahead Eagles ===
In:

No.	Pos.	Nation	Player
6	MF	NED	Calvin Twigt (from Volendam)
17	MF	BEL	Mathis Suray (from Dordrecht)
22	GK	BEL	Jari De Busser (from (Belgium) Lommel)
26	DF	NED	Julius Dirksen (from Emmen)
—	FW	FIN	Oliver Antman (from (Denmark) Nordsjælland)
—	DF	DEN	Aske Adelgaard (from (Denmark) Odense)
—	FW	NED	Milan Smit (from Cambuur)

Out:

No.	Pos.	Nation	Player
1	GK	NED	Jeffrey de Lange (to (France) Marseille)
5	DF	NED	Bas Kuipers (to Twente)
9	FW	BEL	Thibo Baeten (on loan to Roda JC Kerkrade)
10	MF	BEL	Philippe Rommens (to (Hungary) Ferencváros)
18	MF	ISL	Willum Þór Willumsson (to (England) Birmingham City)
19	FW	ESP	Darío Serra (free agent)
20	MF	BEL	Xander Blomme (on loan to Excelsior)
22	GK	NED	Erwin Mulder (free agent)
—	FW	NED	Rashaan Fernandes (to (Cyprus) Omonia 29M, previously on loan at (Portugal) União de Leiria)
—	DF	ARM	Aventis Aventisian (to West Armenia, previously on loan at (Croatia) Jarun Zagreb)

=== Groningen ===
In:

No.	Pos.	Nation	Player
1	GK	SUR	Etienne Vaessen (from RKC Waalwijk)
6	MF	NED	Stije Resink (from Almere City)
9	FW	ISL	Brynjólfur Willumsson (from (Norway) Kristiansund)
22	MF	NED	Finn Stam (on loan from Jong AZ)
25	MF	NED	Thijs Oosting (from Willem II)

Out:

No.	Pos.	Nation	Player
6	MF	CPV	Laros Duarte (to (Hungary) Puskás Akadémia)
15	DF	NED	Nick Bakker (free agent)
17	FW	NOR	Kristian Strømland Lien (on loan to (Norway) Kristiansund)
18	DF	NOR	Isak Dybvik Määttä (to (Norway) Bodø/Glimt)
19	DF	NED	Liam van Gelderen (to RKC Waalwijk)
26	DF	NED	Daniël Beukers (to FC Volendam)
34	MF	IDN	Ragnar Oratmangoen (to (Belgium) Dender)
—	FW	NED	Kevin van Veen (on loan to (Scotland) St Mirren, previously on loan at (Scotland) Kilmarnock)
—	FW	GER	Florian Krüger (to (Belgium) Beerschot, previously on loan at (Germany) Eintracht Braunschweig)

=== Heerenveen ===
In:

No.	Pos.	Nation	Player
3	DF	NED	Sam Kersten (from PEC Zwolle)
6	MF	GER	Amara Condé (from (Germany) 1. FC Magdeburg)
8	MF	NED	Luuk Brouwers (from Utrecht, previously on loan)
10	FW	MAR	Ilias Sebaoui (on loan from Feyenoord, previously on loan at Dordrecht)
14	MF	NED	Levi Smans (from VVV-Venlo)
17	DF	NOR	Nikolai Hopland (on loan from (Norway) Aalesund)
20	FW	DEN	Jacob Trenskow (from (Sweden) Kalmar FF)
24	FW	IRQ	Danilo Al-Saed (from (Norway) Sandefjord)
27	DF	SRB	Mateja Milovanović (from Jong Ajax)

Out:

No.	Pos.	Nation	Player
4	DF	NED	Sven van Beek (to (Qatar) Al-Shahania)
6	DF	NED	Syb van Ottele (to Fortuna Sittard)
11	FW	NED	Pelle van Amersfoort (to (Qatar) Al-Shahania)
20	FW	NOR	Osame Sahraoui (to (France) Lille)
21	MF	NED	Djenahro Nunumete (to Emmen)
26	MF	MAR	Anas Tahiri (free agent)
33	MF	IDN	Thom Haye (free agent)

=== Heracles Almelo ===
In:

No.	Pos.	Nation	Player
2	DF	NED	Mimeirhel Benita (on loan from Feyenoord, previously on loan at Excelsior)
4	DF	NED	Damon Mirani (from Volendam)
10	MF	SUR	Shiloh 't Zand (on loan from Feyenoord, previously on loan at Dordrecht)
13	MF	CZE	Jan Žambůrek (from (Denmark) Viborg, previously on loan at (Czech Republic) Slovan Liberec)
19	FW	BIH	Luka Kulenović (from (Czech Republic) Slovan Liberec)
22	DF	ITA	Lorenzo Milani (from (Italy) Pescara)
23	FW	FIN	Juho Talvitie (on loan from (Belgium) Lommel)
24	DF	SVK	Ivan Mesík (from (Italy) Pescara)
26	MF	NED	Daniël van Kaam (from Cambuur)
29	FW	ISR	Suf Podgoreanu (on loan from (Israel) Maccabi Haifa)
30	GK	BEL	Robin Mantel (from Helmond Sport)

Out:

No.	Pos.	Nation	Player
1	GK	NED	Michael Brouwer (to Utrecht)
2	DF	NED	Sylian Mokono (free agent)
4	DF	GER	Sven Sonnenberg (to (Germany) 1. FC Saarbrücken)
15	DF	NED	Jetro Willems (to (Spain) Castellón)
18	MF	NED	Marko Vejinović (retired)
19	DF	SUR	Navajo Bakboord (free agent)
28	GK	NED	Robin Jalving (to Emmen)
29	FW	SWE	Emil Hansson (to (England) Birmingham City)
31	FW	ITA	Antonio Satriano (on loan to (Italy) Casertana)
34	DF	NED	Chiel Olde Keizer (to Dordrecht)
39	FW	GER	Lasse Wehmeyer (to VVV-Venlo)
—	MF	MAR	Anas Ouahim (to (Australia) Sydney FC, previously on loan at (Moldova) Sheriff Tiraspol)

=== NAC Breda ===
In:

No.	Pos.	Nation	Player
9	FW	POL	Kacper Kostorz (on loan from (Poland) Pogoń Szczecin, previously on loan at Den Bosch)
11	MF	GER	Raul Paula (from (Germany) VfB Stuttgart)
12	DF	AUT	Leo Greiml (from (Germany) Schalke 04)
15	DF	LUX	Enes Mahmutović (from (Bulgaria) CSKA Sofia)
16	MF	AUS	Max Balard (from (Australia) Central Coast Mariners)
23	DF	NED	Terence Kongolo (from (England) Fulham, previously on loan at (Austria) Rapid Wien)
70	FW	POR	Saná Fernandes (on loan from (Italy) Lazio)
77	FW	SVK	Leo Sauer (on loan from Feyenoord)
99	GK	POL	Daniel Bielica (from (Poland) Górnik Zabrze)

Out:

No.	Pos.	Nation	Player
15	DF	CUW	Cuco Martina (free agent)
16	MF	NED	Javier Vet (free agent)
18	MF	NED	Sabir Agougil (free agent)
22	MF	NED	Aimé Omgba (to (Belgium) Gent)
24	DF	NED	Kaj van der Veldt (to Katwijk)
27	FW	NED	Thomas Marijnissen (free agent)
28	DF	NED	Stef de Vijs (to (Belgium) Hoogstraten)
31	DF	SWE	Victor Wernersson (to (Sweden) Västerås)
35	MF	NED	Boris van Schuppen (to Eindhoven)
36	GK	NED	Pepijn van de Merbel (to Den Bosch)

=== NEC ===
In:

No.	Pos.	Nation	Player
1	GK	NED	Stijn van Gassel (from Excelsior)
2	DF	FRA	Brayann Pereira (from (France) Auxerre, previously on loan)
4	DF	ESP	Iván Márquez (on loan from (Germany) 1. FC Nürnberg)
5	DF	NED	Thomas Ouwejan (from (Germany) Schalke 04)
7	MF	ESP	Rober (from (Spain) Real Betis, previously on loan)
8	MF	GRE	Argyris Darelas (from (Greece) PAOK B)
9	FW	JPN	Kento Shiogai (from (Japan) Yokohama F. Marinos)
15	FW	TUR	Başar Önal (from De Graafschap)
18	FW	JPN	Koki Ogawa (from (Japan) Yokohama, previously on loan)
32	FW	NED	Luc Nieuwenhuijs (from Vitesse U17)
—	DF	GRE	Lefteris Lyratzis (on loan from (Greece) PAOK, previously on loan at (Greece) Asteras Tripolis)

Out:

No.	Pos.	Nation	Player
1	GK	NED	Jasper Cillessen (to (Spain) Las Palmas)
12	FW	NED	Bas Dost (free agent)
14	FW	NOR	Lars Olden Larsen (on loan to (Sweden) BK Häcken)
19	FW	NED	Sylla Sow (to (Saudi Arabia) Al-Najma)
28	DF	NED	Bart van Rooij (to Twente)
32	MF	NED	Nils Rossen (to Telstar)
—	FW	POR	Pedro Marques (to (Cyprus) Apollon Limassol)

=== PEC Zwolle ===
In:

No.	Pos.	Nation	Player
2	DF	CUW	Sherel Floranus (from Almere City)
5	DF	BEL	Thierry Lutonda (from RKC Waalwijk)
7	FW	GHA	Braydon Manu (from (Germany) Darmstadt 98)
9	FW	NED	Dylan Vente (on loan from (Scotland) Hibernian)
11	FW	BEL	Dylan Mbayo (on loan from (Belgium) Kortrijk, previously on loan at Dordrecht)
28	DF	DEN	Simon Graves (on loan from (Italy) Palermo)
29	FW	NED	Thomas Buitink (from Vitesse)
35	MF	CPV	Jamiro Monteiro (from (Turkey) Gaziantep)
47	DF	NED	Tristan Gooijer (on loan from Ajax)
—	DF	NED	Olivier Aertssen (from Jong Ajax)

Out:

No.	Pos.	Nation	Player
2	DF	NED	Bram van Polen (to VVOG)
4	DF	NED	Sam Kersten (to SC Heerenveen)
7	MF	DEN	Younes Namli (free agent)
8	MF	NED	Dean Huiberts (to (Belgium) Beerschot)
9	FW	GER	Lennart Thy (to (Singapore) Lion City Sailors)
13	DF	FIN	Thomas Lam (to (Cyprus) Apollon Limassol)
14	FW	GRE	Apostolos Vellios (to (Cyprus) Nea Salamis Famagusta)
16	FW	NED	Divaio Bobson (free agent)

=== PSV Eindhoven ===
In:

No.	Pos.	Nation	Player
2	DF	NED	Rick Karsdorp (from (Italy) Roma)
6	DF	NED	Ryan Flamingo (from Utrecht)
7	MF	USA	Malik Tillman (from (Germany) Bayern Munich, previously on loan)
8	DF	USA	Sergiño Dest (from (Spain) Barcelona, previously on loan)
21	FW	MAR	Couhaib Driouech (from Excelsior)
39	DF	BFA	Adamo Nagalo (from (Denmark) Nordsjælland)

Out:

No.	Pos.	Nation	Player
2	DF	NED	Shurandy Sambo (to (England) Burnley)
3	DF	NED	Jordan Teze (to (France) Monaco)
5	DF	BRA	André Ramalho (to (Brazil) Corinthians)
24	GK	NED	Boy Waterman (retired)
—	FW	NED	Jason van Duiven (to (Belgium) Lommel, previously on loan at Almere City)

=== RKC Waalwijk ===
In:

No.	Pos.	Nation	Player
4	DF	SUR	Liam van Gelderen (from Groningen)
5	DF	NED	Juan Familia-Castillo (free agent)
9	FW	POL	Oskar Zawada (from (New Zealand) Wellington Phoenix)
11	FW	EGY	Alexander Jakobsen (from (Kazakhstan) Zhenis)
16	GK	NED	Luuk Vogels (from OJC Rosmalen)
17	DF	CUW	Roshon van Eijma (from TOP Oss)
18	FW	NED	Silvester van der Water (from Cambuur, previously on loan at PEC Zwolle)
21	GK	NED	Yanick van Osch (from Cambuur)
22	MF	NED	Tim van de Loo (from Telstar)
23	MF	NED	Richard van der Venne (from (Switzerland) St. Gallen)
30	MF	FRA	Daouda Weidmann (from (Italy) Torino, previously on loan)
33	DF	MAR	Faissal Al Mazyani (from (Belgium) Jong Genk)

Out:

No.	Pos.	Nation	Player
1	GK	SUR	Etienne Vaessen (to Groningen)
4	DF	BEL	Shawn Adewoye (to Fortuna Sittard)
5	DF	BEL	Thierry Lutonda (to PEC Zwolle)
9	FW	NED	David Min (to Utrecht)
11	FW	BEL	Zakaria Bakkali (free agent)
13	GK	NED	Mark Spenkelink (free agent)
20	FW	NED	Mats Seuntjens (to (Spain) Castellón)
23	DF	CUW	Juriën Gaari (to (Saudi Arabia) Al-Hazem)
25	DF	NED	Jeffrey Bruma (free agent)

=== Sparta Rotterdam ===
In:

No.	Pos.	Nation	Player
—	DF	NED	Boyd Reith (from Roda JC)
—	MF	NED	Mike Kleijn (from Feyenoord U21)
—	DF	COL	Teo Quintero (from (Belgium) Deinze)
—	MF	MAR	Mohamed Nassoh (from Jong PSV)
—	MF	NED	Julian Baas (from Excelsior)
—	FW	BRA	Kayky (on loan from (England) Manchester City)

Out:

No.	Pos.	Nation	Player
—	FW	NED	Patrick Brouwer (to Quick Boys)
—	GK	NED	Delano van Crooij (to VVV-Venlo, previously on loan)
—	DF	NED	Bart Vriends (to (Australia) Adelaide United)
—	FW	USA	Agustin Anello (to (Uruguay) Boston River, previously on loan at Cambuur)
—	DF	NED	Django Warmerdam (to Excelsior)
—	FW	CUW	Rayvien Rosario (to Excelsior)
—	DF	NED	Tijs Velthuis (on loan to (Italy) Salernitana)

=== Twente ===
In:

No.	Pos.	Nation	Player
3	DF	SWE	Gustaf Lagerbielke (on loan from (Scotland) Celtic)
5	DF	NED	Bas Kuipers (from Go Ahead Eagles)
10	FW	NED	Sam Lammers (from (Scotland) Rangers, previously on loan at Utrecht)
17	DF	BEL	Alec Van Hoorenbeeck (from (Belgium) Mechelen, previously on loan)
28	DF	NED	Bart van Rooij (from NEC)
30	FW	TUN	Sayfallah Ltaief (from (Switzerland) Basel, previously on loan at (Switzerland) Winterthur)

Out:

No.	Pos.	Nation	Player
3	DF	NED	Robin Pröpper (to (Scotland) Rangers)
5	DF	NED	Gijs Smal (to Feyenoord)
12	DF	ISL	Alfons Sampsted (on loan to (England) Birmingham City)
20	DF	CUW	Joshua Brenet (free agent)

=== Utrecht ===
In:

No.	Pos.	Nation	Player
2	DF	BEL	Siebe Horemans (from Excelsior)
5	DF	ISL	Kolbeinn Finnsson (from (Denmark) Lyngby)
6	MF	DEN	Oscar Fraulo (on loan from (Germany) Borussia Mönchengladbach, previously on loan)
9	FW	NED	David Min (from RKC Waalwijk)
11	FW	NED	Noah Ohio (from (Belgium) Standard Liège, previously on loan at (England) Hull City)
20	FW	FRA	Yoann Cathline (on loan from (France) Lorient, previously on loan at Almere City)
21	MF	USA	Paxten Aaronson (on loan from (Germany) Eintracht Frankfurt, previously on loan at Vitesse)
22	FW	ESP	Miguel Rodríguez (on loan from (Spain) Celta Vigo)
25	GK	NED	Michael Brouwer (from Heracles Almelo)
27	MF	BEL	Alonzo Engwanda (from (Belgium) RSCA Futures)
32	GK	NED	Tom de Graaff (from Jong Ajax)
40	DF	BEL	Matisse Didden (from Roda JC)
—	DF	NED	Ryan Flamingo (from (Italy) Sassuolo, previously on loan)

Out:

No.	Pos.	Nation	Player
2	DF	NED	Mark van der Maarel (retired)
5	DF	NED	Hidde ter Avest (to (England) Oxford United)
11	FW	MAR	Marouan Azarkan (to (United Arab Emirates) Al-Nasr)
17	FW	DEN	Jeppe Okkels (to (England) Preston North End)
26	FW	MAR	Othman Boussaid (to (United Arab Emirates) Al-Nasr)
31	GK	NED	Mattijs Branderhorst (on loan to Fortuna Sittard)
32	GK	NED	Thijmen Nijhuis (to (Finland) HJK)
37	FW	SWE	Isac Lidberg (to (Germany) Darmstadt 98)
—	DF	NED	Ryan Flamingo (to PSV Eindhoven)
—	MF	NED	Luuk Brouwers (to Heerenveen, previously on loan)
—	GK	NED	Calvin Raatsie (to Excelsior, previously on loan at Roda JC Kerkrade)

=== Willem II ===
In:

No.	Pos.	Nation	Player
1	GK	FRA	Thomas Didillon-Hödl (from (Belgium) Cercle Brugge)
6	MF	BEL	Boris Lambert (from (Belgium) Eupen)
9	FW	BEL	Kyan Vaesen (on loan from (Belgium) Westerlo)
11	FW	GER	Emilio Kehrer (from (Belgium) Cercle Brugge)
14	MF	BEL	Cisse Sandra (on loan from (Belgium) Club Brugge, previously on loan at Excelsior)
15	DF	SRB	Miodrag Pivaš (on loan from (England) Newcastle United)
21	FW	SWE	Amar Fatah (on loan from (France) Troyes, previously on loan at (Belgium) Lommel)
25	DF	TUR	Mickaël Tirpan (from (Belgium) Lierse)

Out:

No.	Pos.	Nation	Player
3	DF	NED	Freek Heerkens (retired)
6	MF	BEL	Matthias Verreth (to (Italy) Brescia)
10	MF	NED	Max de Waal (on loan to VVV-Venlo)
11	FW	SWE	Max Svensson (to (Sweden) Kalmar)
21	GK	NED	Joshua Smits (to De Graafschap)
23	FW	NED	Michael de Leeuw (to Cambuur)
29	MF	NED	Thijs Oosting (to Groningen)

== See also ==
- 2024–25 Eredivisie
