= Anthony Limbombe =

Belgian footballer (born 1994)

Personal information
- Full name: Anthony Limbombe Ekango
- Date of birth: 15 July 1994 (age 32)
- Place of birth: Mechelen, Belgium
- Height: 1.77 m (5 ft 10 in)
- Positions: Winger; forward

Team information
- Current team: Akritas Chlorakas
- Number: 77

Youth career
- 2000–2005: Mechelen
- 2005–2010: Genk

Senior career*
Years	Team	Apps	(Gls)
2010–2014	Genk	51	(2)
2014	→ Lierse (loan)	6	(2)
2014–2016	NEC	65	(21)
2016–2018	Club Brugge	42	(6)
2018–2022	Nantes	33	(2)
2019	→ Standard Liège (loan)	6	(1)
2022	Nantes II	1	(0)
2022–2023	Almere City	40	(8)
2023–2025	Beveren	48	(10)
2025–2026	Ironi Kiryat Shmona	9	(0)
2026–	Akritas Chlorakas	9	(0)

International career
2009–2010	Belgium U16	11	(4)
2010	Belgium U17	8	(0)
2012–2013	Belgium U19	6	(2)
2018	Belgium	1	(0)
- * Club domestic league appearances and goals as of 1 June 2026

Anthony Limbombe Ekango (born 15 July 1994) is a Belgian professional footballer who plays as a winger or forward for Cypriot First Division club Akritas Chlorakas.

== Club career ==
=== Racing Genk ===
Born in Mechelen, Limbombe began his youth career with Mechelen in 2000. In 2005, he joined Belgian Pro League side Racing Genk. He made his first team debut at the age of 16 in a 3–1 victory at Lokeren on 18 September 2010. He also played for Genk in the Champions League and the UEFA Europa League. During his career with Racing Genk he won the Belgian Pro League in 2010–11 season, and he also won the Belgian Super Cup in 2011, in total he scored 2 goals in 62 League appearances.

For the second half of the 2013–14 season, Limbombe was sent on loan to Lierse SK where he scored 2 goals in 7 games.

=== NEC Nijmegen ===
On 30 August 2014, he signed with Eerste Divisie side N.E.C on a three-year deal with the option of a fourth year. He impressed in his first season at the club, scoring 14 goals and providing numerous assists in his debut season at the club, helping N.E.C. win the Eerste Divisie as champions and gain promotion to Eredivisie.

On 12 August 2015, Limbombe played for N.E.C. against Excelsior in the opening day of the 2015–16 Eredivisie season in a 1–0 victory. A day later, NEC rejected a £1.5 million bid from English side Leeds United for Limbombe. On 22 August, the club announced that Limbombe had been left out of the squad against Ajax due to deeming him 'insufficiently focused' after the interest linking him with Leeds United. However, on 1 September, Leeds ended their interest in Limbombe after failing to up the bid, signing winger Jordan Botaka from Dutch Club Excelsior instead.

After impressing during the 2015–16 season, scoring 7 goals and gaining 7 assists in the Eredivisie, on 1 June 2016, Limbombe amid further interest again from English side Leeds United, handed in a transfer request at NEC. However, Leeds were again unable to agree on a fee with N.E.C for the player.

=== Club Brugge ===
On 23 July 2016, Limbombe returned to Belgium to join Club Brugge on a four-year deal for a fee around the margin of £2 million.

=== Nantes ===
On 23 August 2018, Limbombe joined French side Nantes on a five-year deal for a fee around the margin of €7 million.

==== Loan to Standard Liège ====
On 26 June 2019, Limbombe joined Belgian side Standard Liège on a one-year loan. His new club secured an option to sign him permanently. After scoring in his first match for the club, he suffered a knee injury in October. In December 2019, it was announced that Limbombe's loan at Standard Liège would be cut short and that he would return to Nantes in January.

==== Return to Nantes ====
Limbombe made no appearances on the field for Nantes in the 2020–21 and 2021–22 season. On 4 April 2022, his contract was terminated by mutual consent.

=== Almere City ===
On 26 June 2022, Limbombe signed a two-year contract with Eerste Divisie club Almere City.

=== Beveren ===
On 6 September 2023, Limbombe moved to Beveren on a two-season contract.

== International career ==
Limbombe was born in Belgium to Congolese parents, and is eligible to represent either nation. He represented Belgium at U16 international level and has played at Belgium U17 level. In 2012, he was capped for Belgium U19's.

He was named in the Roberto Martinez Belgian squad for the friendly against Saudi Arabia in Brussels on 27 March 2018. He made his debut in a 4–0 win against Saudi Arabia, as he was subbed in at half-time.

== Personal life ==
Anthony is the older brother of the footballer Bryan and the younger brother of the footballer Stallone Limbombe.

== Career statistics ==
As of match played 16 December 2023

Appearances and goals by club, season and competition
Club	Season	League			National cup (Note: Includes Belgian Cup, KNVB Cup, Coupe de France)		League cup (Note: Includes Coupe de la Ligue)		Europe		Other		Total	
Club	Season	Division	Apps	Goals	Apps	Goals	Apps	Goals	Apps	Goals	Apps	Goals	Apps	Goals
Genk	2010–11	Pro League	11	0	2	0	—		0	0	3 (Note: Appearances in Belgian Pro League Championship playoff)	0	16	0
Genk	2011–12	Pro League	17	1	2	1	—		4 (Note: Appearances in UEFA Champions League)	0	7	0	30	2
Genk	2012–13	Pro League	8	1	4	1	—		3 (Note: Appearances in UEFA Europa League)	0	1	0	16	2
Genk	2013–14	Pro League	15	0	3	0	—		5	1	1 (Note: Appearances in Belgian Super Cup)	0	24	1
Genk	Total		51	2	11	2	0	0	12	1	12	0	86	5
Lierse (loan)	2013–14	Pro League	6	2	0	0	—		—		1 (Note: Appearances in Belgian Pro League Europa League playoff)	0	7	2
NEC Nijmegen	2014–15	Eerste Divisie	33	14	3	2	—		—		—		36	16
NEC Nijmegen	2015–16	Eredivisie	32	7	2	0	—		—		—		34	7
NEC Nijmegen	Total		65	21	5	2	0	0	0	0	0	0	70	23
Club Brugge	2016–17	First Division A	15	0	2	1	—		4	0	8	0	29	1
Club Brugge	2017–18	First Division A	27	6	5	0	—		2	0	5	0	39	6
Club Brugge	Total		42	6	7	1	0	0	6	0	13	0	68	7
Nantes	2018–19	Ligue 1	29	1	4	2	0	0	—		—		33	3
Nantes	2019–20	Ligue 1	4	1	1	0	0	0	—		—		5	1
Nantes	2020–21	Ligue 1	0	0	0	0	—		—		—		0	0
Nantes	2021–22	Ligue 1	0	0	0	0	—		—		—		0	0
Nantes	Total		33	2	5	2	0	0	—		—		38	4
Standard Liège (loan)	2019–20 (Note: Season curtailed due to COVID-19 pandemic in Belgium)	First Division A	6	1	0	0	—		1	0	0	0	7	1
Nantes II	2021–22	Championnat National 2	0	0	0	0	—		—		—		0	0
Almere City	2022–23	Eerste Divisie	31	6	2	0	—		—		6 (Note: Appearances in Eredivisie promotion/relegation playoffs)	2	39	8
Almere City	2023–24	Eredivisie	3	0	—		—		—		—		3	0
Almere City	Total		34	6	2	0	—		—		6	2	42	8
Beveren	2023–24	Challenger Pro League	12	4	3	0	—		—		—		15	4
Career total			250	44	33	7	0	0	19	1	32	2	334	54

== Honours ==
Racing Genk

- Belgian Pro League: 2010–11
- Belgian Super Cup: 2011

NEC

- Eerste Divisie: 2014–15

Individual

- Ebony Shoe: 2018
