= Marcelencio Esajas =

Dutch footballer (born 2002)

Personal information
- Date of birth: 10 June 2002 (age 24)
- Place of birth: Amsterdam, Netherlands
- Height: 1.74 m (5 ft 9 in)
- Position: Midfielder

Team information
- Current team: TOP Oss
- Number: 8

Youth career
- –2014: Vlug en Vaardig
- 2014–2021: Almere City

Senior career*
Years	Team	Apps	(Gls)
2021–2024	Almere City	33	(0)
2023–2024	Jong Almere City	22	(2)
2024–	TOP Oss	68	(3)
- * Club domestic league appearances and goals as of 28 April 2026

Marcelencio Esajas (born 10 June 2002) is a Dutch professional footballer who plays as a midfielder for Eerste Divisie club TOP Oss.

== Career ==
=== Almere City ===
Esajas started playing football for Amsterdam-based club Vlug en Vaardig before he was admitted to the Almere City youth academy in 2014. After impressing with the under-21 team coached by Hedwiges Maduro, he signed his first professional contract in September 2021; a three-year deal.

He made his professional debut on 27 August 2021 in an Eerste Divisie match against Roda JC Kerkrade. He started the away game on the bench, but head coach Gertjan Verbeek gave him his debut in the 69th minute when he came on for Ryan Koolwijk in a 4–3 win. He made 18 appearances for the first team in the 2021–22 season, as Almere finished in a disappointing 14th place.

In the subsequent season, Almere City notably improved, securing third place in the 2022–23 Eerste Divisie. Esajas played a part in their success with 14 appearances, often entering as a substitute. Additionally, he contributed in four playoff matches, aiding the team in their historic promotion by defeating Emmen in the play-off finals.

Esajas made his debut in the Eredivisie for Almere City on 13 August 2023, stepping onto the field in the 57th minute as a substitute for Pascu. Shortly after entering the match, he provided his first assist, setting up Danny Post for Almere City's consolation goal in the 4–1 home defeat against Twente. However, throughout that season, Esajas primarily played for the second team, Jong Almere City, who themselves secured a significant promotion to the third-tier Tweede Divisie in the previous season.

=== TOP Oss ===
On 27 June 2024, Esajas signed a two-year contract with an option for an additional year with Eerste Divisie club TOP Oss.

== Style of play ==
Described as a hardworking player, Esajas excels in a box-to-box role. He is adept at engaging in duels and possesses a keen ability to recover possession, making him effective on both ends of the pitch.

== Personal life ==
Esajas was born in the Netherlands and is of Surinamese descent.

== Career statistics ==
As of match played 1 November 2024

Appearances and goals by club, season and competition
Club	Season	League			KNVB Cup		Other		Total	
Club	Season	Division	Apps	Goals	Apps	Goals	Apps	Goals	Apps	Goals
Almere City	2021–22	Eerste Divisie	18	0	0	0	—		18	0
Almere City	2022–23	Eerste Divisie	14	0	0	0	4 (Note: Appearances in Eredivisie promotion/relegation playoffs)	0	18	0
Almere City	2023–24	Eredivisie	1	0	1	0	—		2	0
Almere City	Total		33	0	1	0	4	0	38	0
Jong Almere City	2023–24	Tweede Divisie	22	2	—		—		22	2
TOP Oss	2024–25	Eerste Divisie	9	0	1	0	—		10	0
Career total			64	2	2	0	4	0	70	2
