= Damian van Bruggen =

Dutch footballer (born 1996)

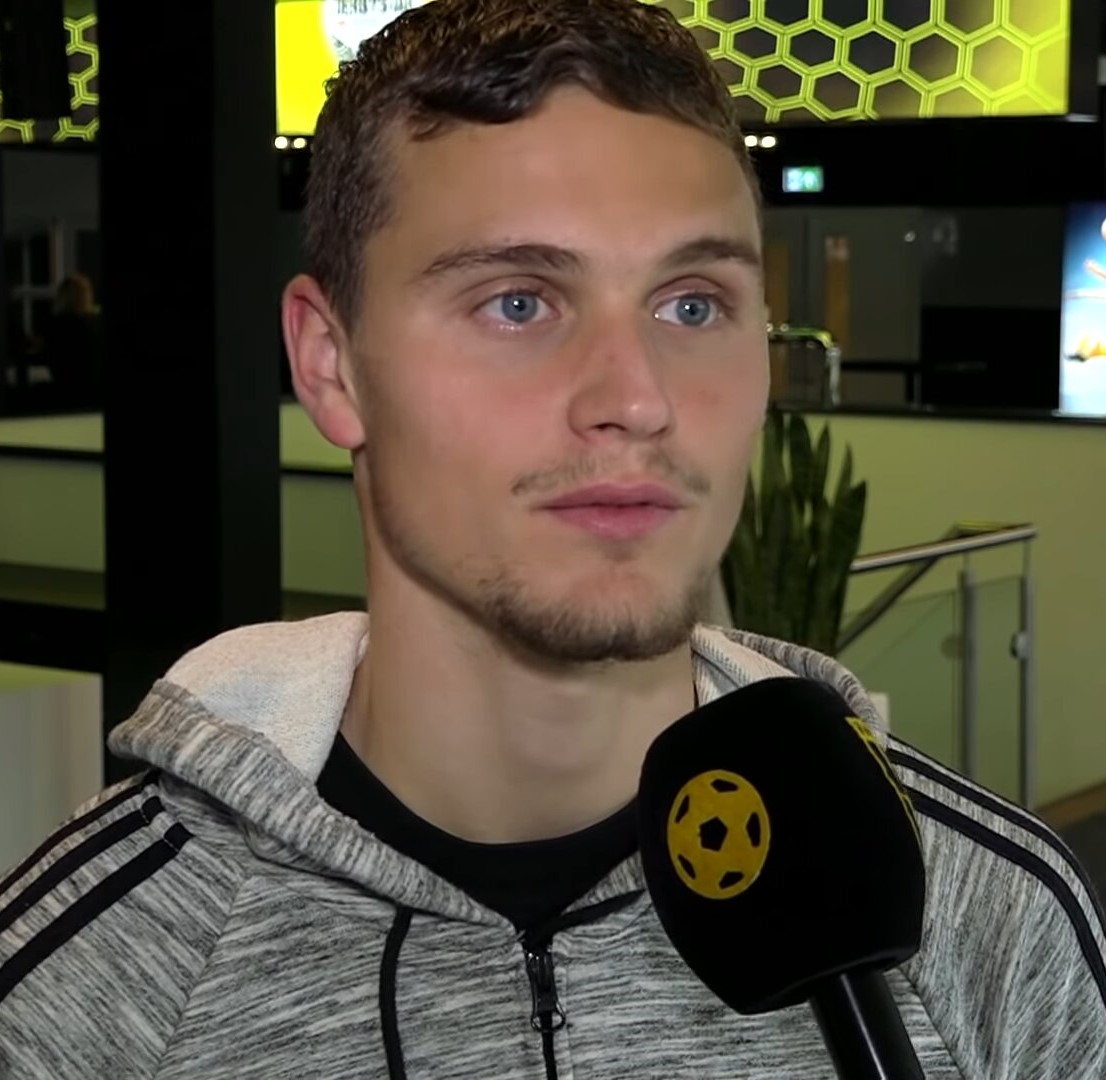
- Van Bruggen in 2018

Personal information
- Date of birth: 18 March 1996 (age 30)
- Place of birth: Utrecht, Netherlands
- Height: 1.85 m (6 ft 1 in)
- Position: Centre-back

Team information
- Current team: Almere City
- Number: 44

Youth career
- –2011: Almere City
- 2011–2014: Ajax

Senior career*
Years	Team	Apps	(Gls)
2014–2016	Jong Ajax	60	(2)
2016–2018	Jong PSV	36	(0)
2017–2018	→ VVV-Venlo (loan)	26	(2)
2018–2020	VVV-Venlo	22	(0)
2020	Inter Zaprešić	16	(0)
2020–2022	Slaven Belupo	49	(1)
2022	Olimpija Ljubljana	16	(0)
2022–2024	Almere City	68	(1)
2024–2026	Vejle	29	(1)
2026–	Almere City	8	(0)

International career
2011–2012	Netherlands U16	4	(0)
2012–2013	Netherlands U17	11	(2)
2013	Netherlands U18	3	(0)
2014–2015	Netherlands U19	10	(2)
2016	Netherlands U20	3	(0)
2016–2017	Netherlands U21	2	(0)
- * Club domestic league appearances and goals as of 3 October 2026

Damian van Bruggen (born 18 March 1996) is a Dutch professional footballer who plays for Eerste Divisie club Almere City. Mainly a centre-back, he can also play as a defensive midfielder or a full-back.

== Club career ==
Van Bruggen moved from Almere City to the Ajax youth academy at the start of the 2011–12 season. In March 2013, Van Bruggen signed his first professional contract with Ajax, at the age of 16.

Van Bruggen made his professional debut for Jong Ajax as a 61st-minute substitute for Ricardo van Rhijn in an Eerste Divisie match against Fortuna Sittard on 16 August 2014.

He moved on a season-long loan to Eredivisie club VVV-Venlo in August 2017. After a successful season, he joined the club on a permanent deal in May 2018.

Between 2020 and 2022, Van Bruggen played for Croatian clubs Inter Zaprešić and Slaven Belupo, then briefly joined Slovenian side Olimpija Ljubljana in February 2022. He returned to his native Netherlands in July 2022, rejoining his first club, Almere City. His stint at the club proved rewarding as he played a crucial role in their historic promotion to the Eredivisie during the 2022–23 season, scoring once in 43 league appearances, including the play-offs. Under Van Bruggen's captaincy, the team secured their promotion after a victory over Emmen in the play-off finals.

On 5 July 2024, Danish Superliga club Vejle Boldklub confirmed that they had signed van Bruggen on a deal until 30 June 2026.

On 7 August 2026, van Bruggen returned to Almere City on a one-season contract.

== Career statistics ==
As of match played 19 May 2024

Appearances and goals by club, season and competition
Club	Season	League			National cup		Other		Total	
Club	Season	Division	Apps	Goals	Apps	Goals	Apps	Goals	Apps	Goals
Jong Ajax	2014–15	Eerste Divisie	31	2	—		—		31	2
Jong Ajax	2015–16	Eerste Divisie	29	0	—		—		29	0
Jong Ajax	Total		60	2	—		—		60	2
Jong PSV	2016–17	Eerste Divisie	36	0	—		—		26	0
VVV-Venlo (loan)	2017–18	Eredivisie	26	2	3	1	—		29	3
VVV-Venlo	2018–19	Eredivisie	18	0	2	0	—		20	0
VVV-Venlo	2019–20	Eredivisie	4	0	0	0	—		4	0
VVV-Venlo	Total		22	0	2	0	—		24	0
Inter Zaprešić	2019–20	Croatian Football League	16	0	0	0	—		16	0
Slaven Belupo	2020–21	Croatian Football League	28	1	3	0	—		31	1
Slaven Belupo	2021–22	Croatian Football League	21	0	3	0	—		24	0
Slaven Belupo	Total		49	1	6	0	—		55	1
Olimpija Ljubljana	2021–22	Slovenian PrvaLiga	16	0	0	0	—		16	0
Almere City	2022–23	Eerste Divisie	37	1	2	0	6 (Note: Appearances in Eredivisie promotion/relegation playoffs)	0	44	1
Almere City	2023–24	Eerste Divisie	31	0	1	0	—		32	0
Almere City	Total		68	1	3	0	6	0	77	1
Vejle Boldklub	2024–25	Danish Superliga	0	0	0	0	—		0	0
Career total			293	6	14	1	6	0	313	7
