= Thomas Robinet =

French footballer (born 1996)

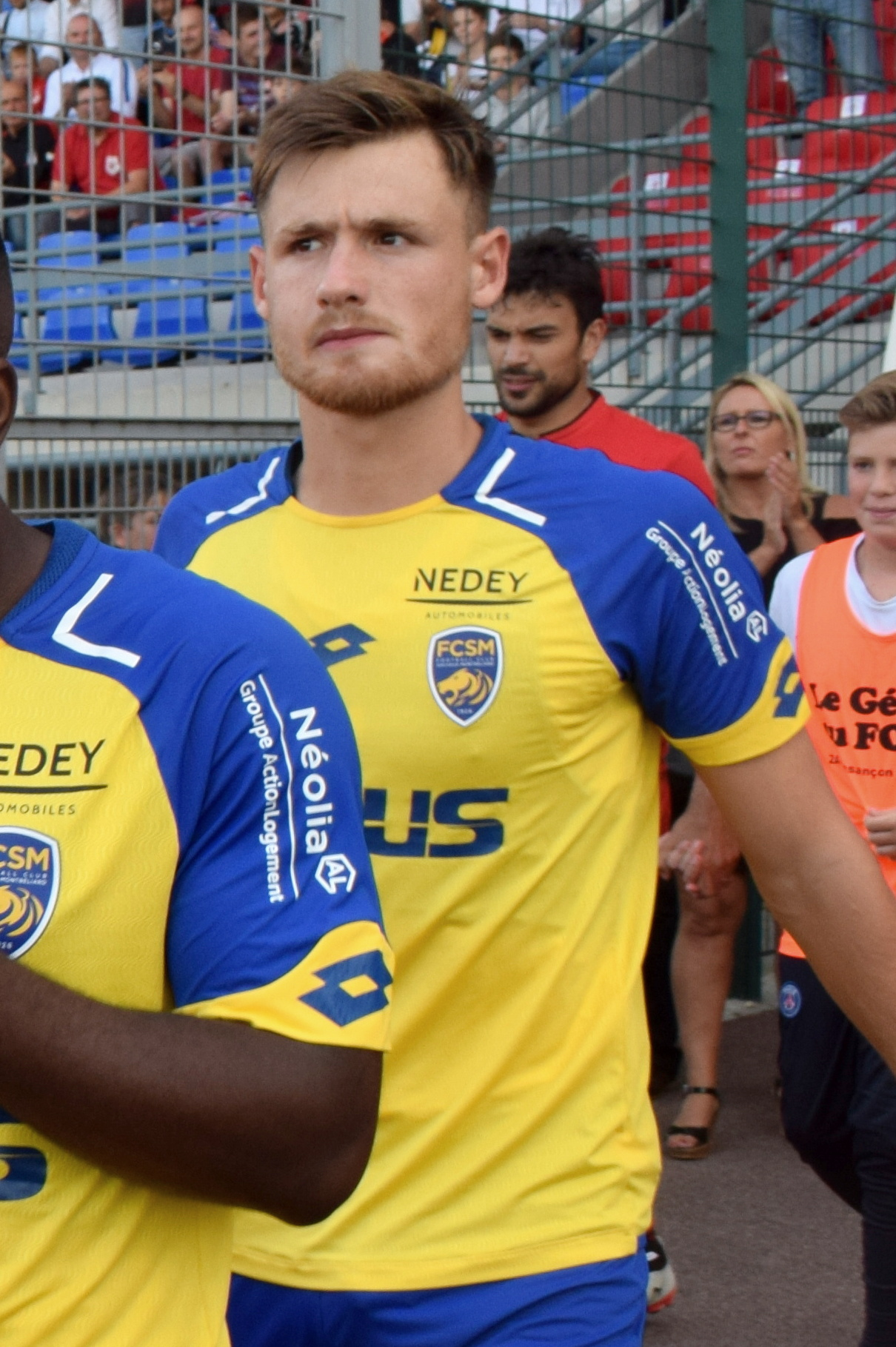
- Robinet in 2017

Personal information
- Date of birth: 18 August 1996 (age 30)
- Place of birth: Saint-Priest, Metropolis of Lyon, France
- Height: 1.80 m (5 ft 11 in)
- Position: Forward

Team information
- Current team: Nantes
- Number: 27

Youth career
- 2001–2003: FCO Chandieu
- 2003–2008: Lyon
- 2008–2011: Saint-Priest
- 2011–2013: Sochaux

Senior career*
Years	Team	Apps	(Gls)
2013–2019	Sochaux B	65	(15)
2015–2019	Sochaux	73	(2)
2019–2020	Villefranche	22	(9)
2020–2021	Laval	32	(12)
2021–2022	Châteauroux	36	(19)
2022–2023	KV Oostende	0	(0)
2022–2023	→ Nancy (loan)	27	(8)
2023–2025	Almere City	67	(13)
2025–2026	Dunkerque	34	(16)
2026–	Nantes	0	(0)

International career
2013	France U17	2	(0)
2016	France U20	4	(1)
- * Club domestic league appearances and goals as of 28 August 2026

Thomas Robinet (born 18 August 1996) is a French professional footballer who plays as a forward for Ligue 2 club Nantes.

== Career ==
Robinet's youth career started at FCO Chandieu, before spending five years with Lyon and then spending time at Saint-Priest. Whilst at Saint-Priest he was part of the Pôle Espoir (part of the structure of French Football showcasing young talent) in Dijon, and was signed by FC Sochaux-Montbéliard into their youth system in 2011.

He made his debut for Sochaux on 31 July 2015, in the first round of the 2015–16 Ligue 2 season, coming on as a late substitute in the 0–0 draw at Clermont. His full debut came later the year, on 15 October, in the 1–0 win over Evian Thonon Gaillard F.C. On 20 January 2016 he signed his first professional contract with the club, committing himself to Sochaux until 2018. His first league goal for the club came on 12 August 2016, in a 2–1 victory at Clermont.

In the summer of 2019, at the end of his Sochaux contract, Robinet left the club and signed for Championnat National side FC Villefranche. After scoring 9 goals in 22 league appearances, he moved to Stade Lavallois in May 2020, signing a one-year contract, with an option for two more should Laval secure promotion.

After failing to seal promotion with Stade Lavallois, Robinet moved to LB Châteauroux on 1 July 2021 on a three-year deal.

After a good season with Châteauroux in Championnat National, Robinet earned a move to Belgian Pro League side K.V. Oostende, who loaned him out to AS Nancy Lorraine for the 2022-2023 season.

On 10 July 2023, Robinet joined newly-promoted Eredivisie side Almere City FC on a three-year deal.

Following Almere City's relegation, on 25 August 2025, Robinet returned to France and signed a three-season contract with Dunkerque in Ligue 2.

On 1 September 2026, Robinet moved to Nantes on a two-year deal.
