= Manel Royo =

Spanish footballer (born 1994)

Personal information
- Full name: Manel Royo Castell
- Date of birth: 28 February 1994 (age 32)
- Place of birth: Alcanar, Spain
- Height: 1.83 m (6 ft 0 in)
- Position: Left-back

Team information
- Current team: Gimnàstic Tarragona

Youth career
- Alcanar
- 2006–2007: Amposta
- 2007–2008: Gimnàstic
- 2008–2010: Espanyol
- 2010–2011: Villarreal
- 2011–2012: Roda
- 2012–2013: Villarreal
- 2013–2014: Nike Academy

Senior career*
| Years | Team | Apps | (Gls) |
| 2014–2015 | Conquense | 24 | (0) |
| 2015–2017 | Valladolid B | 62 | (0) |
| 2017–2018 | Espanyol B | 21 | (0) |
| 2018–2019 | Barakaldo | 15 | (0) |
| 2019 | Teplice B | 6 | (0) |
| 2019 | Teplice | 4 | (0) |
| 2020–2021 | Ebro | 26 | (0) |
| 2021–2022 | Costa Brava | 35 | (0) |
| 2022–2024 | Almere City | 45 | (1) |
| 2024–2025 | NAC Breda | 19 | (1) |
| 2025 | Andorra | 4 | (0) |
| 2025–2026 | Teruel | 35 | (3) |
| 2026– | Gimnàstic Tarragona | 0 | (0) |
- * Club domestic league appearances and goals as of 10 June 2026

Manel Royo Castell (born 28 February 1994) is a Spanish professional footballer who plays as a left-back for Gimnàstic de Tarragona.

== Career ==
Born in Alcanar, Tarragona, Catalonia, Royo began his career with hometown side CD Alcanar, and subsequently played for CF Amposta, Gimnàstic de Tarragona, RCD Espanyol and Villarreal CF as a youth. In 2013, after leaving the latter, he spent a year at the Nike Academy before signing for Segunda División B side UB Conquense on 30 July 2014.

On 3 July 2015, Royo moved to Real Valladolid, being assigned to the reserves also in the third division. On 3 July 2017, he returned to Espanyol and was assigned to the B-team in Tercera División.

Royo left Espanyol in July 2018, and spent nearly four months without a club before agreeing to a deal with Barakaldo CF on 27 November. In June of the following year, he moved abroad for the first time in his career, signing for Czech club FK Teplice.

Royo made his professional – and Fortuna liga – debut on 1 September 2019, coming on as a late substitute for Pavel Moulis in a 0–0 home draw against MFK Karviná. The following 8 February, after featuring rarely, he returned to his home country and signed for CD Ebro in the third tier.

On 15 July 2021, Royo agreed to a deal with Primera División RFEF side UE Llagostera. The club later changed name to UE Costa Brava, and despite being an undisputed starter during the entire campaign, he was unable to prevent team relegation.

Royo joined Dutch Eerste Divisie club Almere City FC on 19 July 2022, signing a two-year contract. He made his competitive debut on the opening day of the 2022–23 season, coming off the bench in the 76th minute for Thomas Poll in a 3–0 loss to VVV-Venlo, and achieved promotion to the Eredivisie with the club at the end of the season.

On 24 January 2024, Royo joined NAC Breda on a one-and-a-half-year contract, with a club option for another season. He also helped the club to a top tier promotion, but was rarely used afterwards.

On 2 February 2025, Royo moved to FC Andorra in the Spanish third tier. On 5 August, after helping the side to achieve promotion to Segunda División, he signed for CD Teruel in division three.

On 17 June 2026, Royo returned to Nàstic on a two-year contract, being now a first team member in the third division.
