= Rajiv van La Parra =

Dutch professional footballer (born 1991)

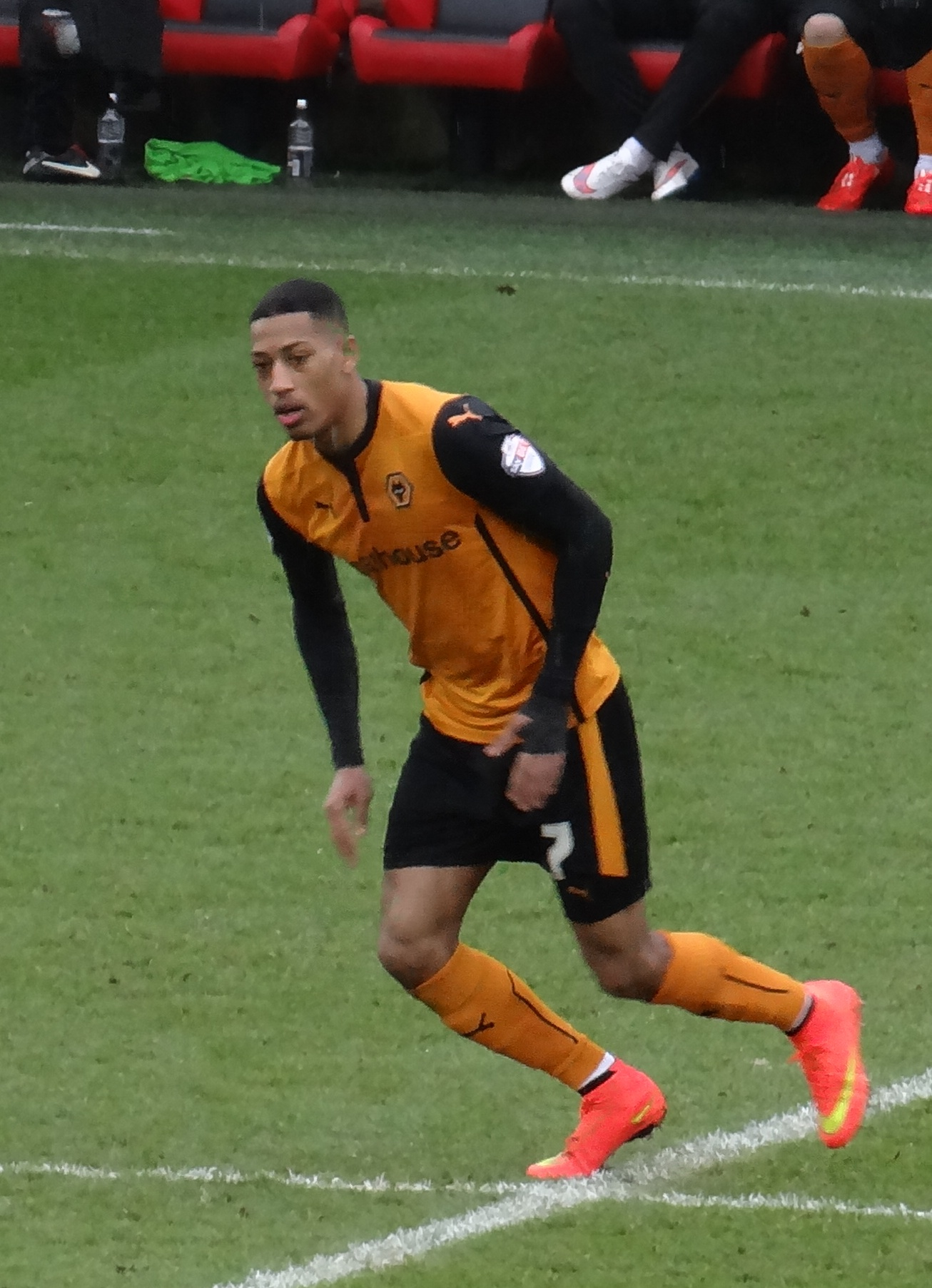
- Van La Parra playing for Wolverhampton Wanderers in 2015

Personal information
- Full name: Rajiv Ramon van La Parra
- Date of birth: 4 June 1991 (age 35)
- Place of birth: Rotterdam, Netherlands
- Height: 1.81 m (5 ft 11 in)
- Position: Winger

Youth career
- 1999–2008: Feyenoord

Senior career*
Years	Team	Apps	(Gls)
2008–2011	Caen B	13	(1)
2008–2011	Caen	16	(1)
2011–2014	SC Heerenveen	82	(14)
2014–2016	Wolverhampton Wanderers	53	(1)
2015–2016	→ Brighton & Hove Albion (loan)	6	(2)
2016	→ Huddersfield Town (loan)	8	(0)
2016–2019	Huddersfield Town	85	(5)
2019	→ Middlesbrough (loan)	3	(0)
2019–2020	Red Star Belgrade	4	(0)
2020–2021	Logroñés	3	(0)
2021	Würzburger Kickers	10	(1)
2021–2022	Apollon Smyrnis	18	(0)
2023–2024	Almere City	40	(3)
2025–2026	Beerschot	39	(6)

International career
2005–2008	Netherlands U17	17	(0)
2009–2010	Netherlands U19	13	(1)
2012–2013	Netherlands U21	6	(0)
- * Club domestic league appearances and goals as of 19 April 2026

Rajiv Ramon van La Parra (born 4 June 1991) is a Dutch professional footballer who is a winger, he can also play as a striker. At the international level, he has represented the Netherlands U21.

Van La Parra played his first senior games in France with Caen before returning to the Netherlands in 2011 for a three-season-long stay with SC Heerenveen. In June 2014, he moved to England to join Wolverhampton Wanderers, who loaned him to Brighton & Hove Albion and Huddersfield Town before he joined the latter in 2016.

== Club career ==
=== Caen ===
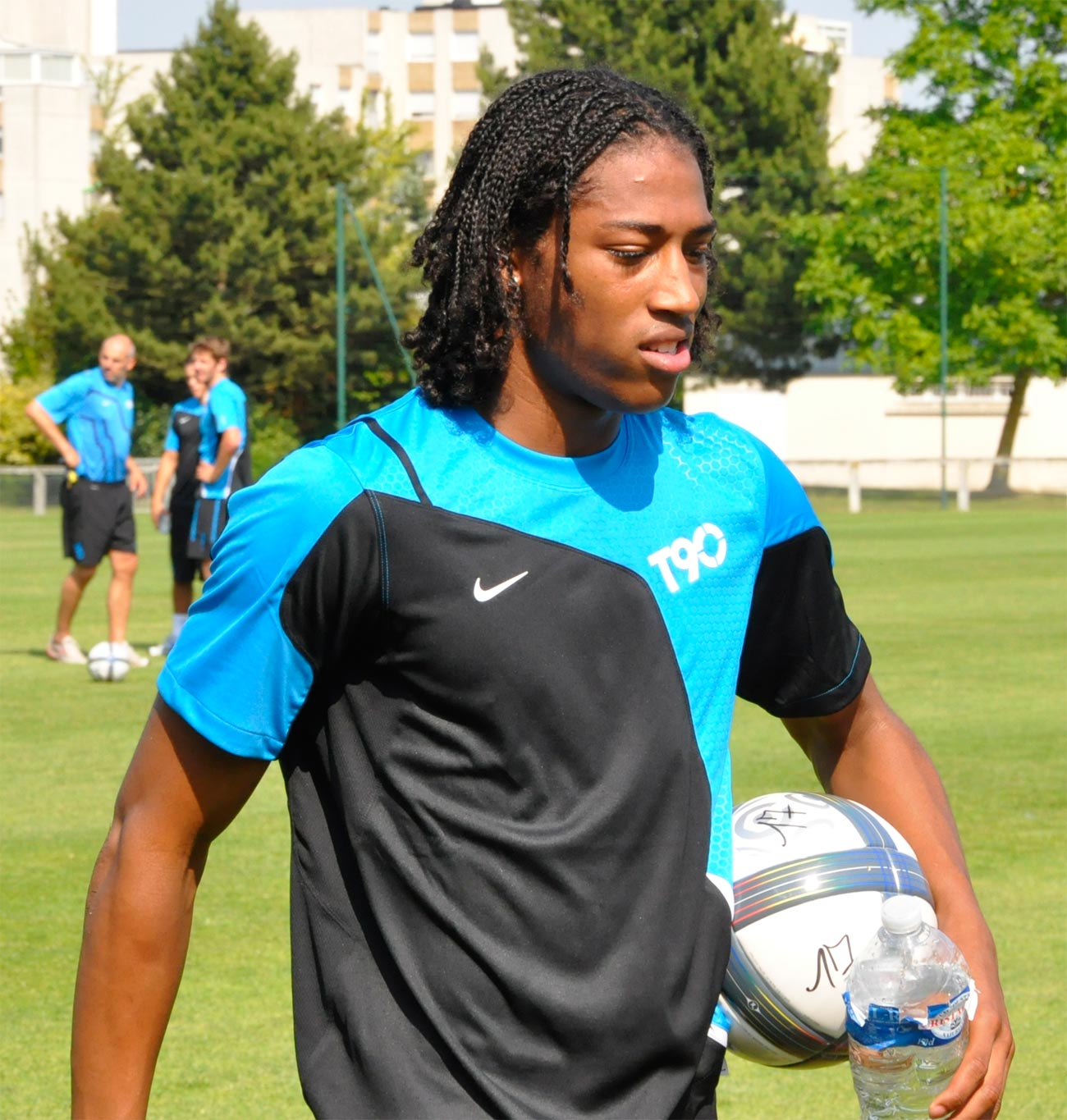
Van La Parra training with Caen in 2010.

Van La Parra is a product of the Feyenoord youth system, but made his senior debut instead for French Ligue 1 club Caen on 8 November 2008, having agreed a four-year contract in June 2008. He cited the potential to reach the highest level while playing in France as the reason for his transfer.

The right winger made only two appearances for Caen's first team during his first season, and the club ended the campaign being relegated. Despite this relegation, Van La Parra would make only a further eight appearances as the team won promotion back to the top flight, but did register his first senior goal; against Guingamp on 5 April 2009. During these seasons, he instead gained playing time in Caen's second team that competed in the Championnat de France amateur.

=== SC Heerenveen ===
In summer 2011, his contract was terminated and he returned to the Netherlands in search of a new club. After an unsuccessful trial at AZ Alkmaar, he eventually signed a one-year contract with fellow Eredivisie side SC Heerenveen on 30 August 2011. After scoring six times during 26 appearances in his debut season, Heerenveen elected to take up an option in his contract for two further seasons. Over these three seasons, Van La Parra made 94 appearances (including playing in the Europa League), scoring 16 times.

=== Wolverhampton Wanderers ===
His contract from Heerenveen expired in the summer of 2014, and after rejecting a new contract, on 10 June it was announced that he would move to English Championship side Wolverhampton Wanderers, with whom he had signed a three-year contract. He made his debut in the first match on 10 August 2014 against Norwich City, and was named man of the match. He scored his first goal for Wolves against Fulham in the FA Cup on 13 January 2015. His first league goal came against future club Brighton & Hove Albion in a 1–1 draw on 14 March 2015.

On 26 November 2015, Van La Parra signed a loan deal with Brighton, lasting until 2 January 2016.

=== Huddersfield Town ===
On 11 March 2016, after some speculation, Van La Parra signed on loan for fellow Championship side Huddersfield Town for the rest of the season, with the move becoming a permanent deal in the summer, on a three-year contract. He made his debut for the Terriers in the 4–1 West Yorkshire derby win against Leeds United at Elland Road on 19 March, and scored his first goal in their 1–0 win over his former club Wolves at the Kirklees Stadium on 27 August.

=== Later career ===
On 31 August 2019, Van La Parra signed a three-year contract with Serbian club Red Star Belgrade in a €1.2 million transfer from Huddersfield Town.

On 16 November 2020, free agent van La Parra signed a one-year deal with Spanish Segunda División side UD Logroñés. He was released from his contract on 31 January 2021, having made four appearances for the side.

Van La Parra joined 2. Bundesliga club Würzburger Kickers on a free transfer on 1 February 2021, a day after being released by Logroñes.

== Personal life ==
Born in the Netherlands, Van La Parra is of Surinamese descent. He was named after prime minister of India, Rajiv Gandhi, who was assassinated two weeks before his birth. He is the half-brother of footballers Georginio Wijnaldum and Giliano Wijnaldum, the former of whom became a senior international for the Netherlands. He is the cousin of Giovanni Drenthe and Royston Drenthe, who were capped by Suriname and the Netherlands respectively.

== Career statistics ==
As of match played on 7 October 2023

Appearances and goals by club, season and competition
Club	Season	League			Cup		League Cup		Other		Total	
Club	Season	Division	Apps	Goals	Apps	Goals	Apps	Goals	Apps	Goals	Apps	Goals
Caen B	2010–11	CFA	12	1	—		—		—		12	1
Caen B	2011–12	CFA	1	0	—		—		—		1	0
Caen B	Total		13	1	—		—		—		13	1
Caen	2008–09	Ligue 1	2	0	0	0	0	0	—		2	0
Caen	2009–10	Ligue 2	8	1	0	0	0	0	—		8	1
Caen	2010–11	Ligue 1	6	0	0	0	1	0	—		7	0
Caen	Total		16	1	0	0	1	0	—		17	1
SC Heerenveen	2011–12	Eredivisie	23	4	3	2	—		0	0	26	6
SC Heerenveen	2012–13	Eredivisie	29	5	1	0	—		6	0	36	5
SC Heerenveen	2013–14	Eredivisie	30	5	3	0	—		2	0	35	5
SC Heerenveen	Total		82	14	7	2	—		8	0	97	16
Wolverhampton Wanderers	2014–15	Championship	40	1	1	1	0	0	0	0	41	2
Wolverhampton Wanderers	2015–16	Championship	13	0	2	0	1	0	0	0	16	0
Wolverhampton Wanderers	Total		53	1	3	1	1	0	0	0	57	2
Brighton & Hove Albion (loan)	2015–16	Championship	6	2	0	0	—		0	0	6	2
Huddersfield Town (loan)	2015–16	Championship	8	0	—		—		0	0	8	0
Huddersfield Town	2016–17	Championship	43	2	2	0	1	0	0	0	46	2
Huddersfield Town	2017–18	Premier League	33	3	4	2	1	0	0	0	38	4
Huddersfield Town	2018–19	Premier League	5	0	0	0	0	0	0	0	5	0
Huddersfield Town	2019–20	Championship	4	0	0	0	1	0	0	0	5	0
Huddersfield Town	Total		93	5	6	2	2	0	0	0	102	7
Middlesbrough (loan)	2018–19	Championship	3	0	2	0	1	0	0	0	6	0
Red Star	2019–20	Serbian SuperLiga	4	0	2	1	—		5 (Note: Appearances in the UEFA Champions League)	0	11	1
Logroñés	2020–21	Segunda División	3	0	1	0	—		—		4	0
Würzburger Kickers	2020–21	2. Bundesliga	10	1	0	0	—		—		10	1
Apollon Smyrnis	2021–22	Super League Greece	18	0	1	0	—		—		19	0
Almere City	2022–23	Eerste Divisie	8	1	0	0	—		6 (Note: Appearances in the 2022–23 Eerste Division promotion play-offs)	2	14	3
Almere City	2023–24	Eredivisie	8	1	0	0	—		—		8	1
Almere City	Total		16	2	0	0	0	0	6	2	22	4
Career total			317	27	21	6	4	0	19	2	362	35

== Honours ==
Huddersfield Town

- EFL Championship play-offs: 2017
