= Nordin Bakker =

Dutch footballer (born 1997)

Personal information
- Date of birth: 31 October 1997 (age 29)
- Place of birth: Oostknollendam, Netherlands
- Height: 1.96 m (6 ft 5 in)
- Position: Goalkeeper

Team information
- Current team: Midtjylland
- Number: 25

Youth career
- VV Knollendam
- –2016: Fortuna Wormerveer

Senior career*
| Years | Team | Apps | (Gls) |
| 2016–2018 | Fortuna Wormerveer | | |
| 2018–2019 | Jong Volendam | 16 | (1) |
| 2018–2021 | Volendam | 53 | (0) |
| 2021–2022 | Beroe Stara Zagora | 8 | (0) |
| 2022–2025 | Almere City | 114 | (0) |
| 2025–2026 | Heerenveen | 1 | (0) |
| 2026– | Midtjylland | 2 | (0) |
- * Club domestic league appearances and goals as of 19 October 2026

Nordin Bakker (born 31 October 1997) is a Dutch professional footballer who plays as a goalkeeper for Danish Superliga club Midtjylland.

== Club career ==
=== Fortuna Wormerveer ===
Bakker first made a mark in indoor football at sixteen, impressing at FC Kondo Budjang before moving to sixth-tier Eerste Klasse club Fortuna Wormerveer. In 2017, he had trials with PSV and Ajax, but chose to stay at Wormerveen for the remainder for the season.

=== Volendam ===
Ahead of the 2018–19 season, Bakker signed a one-year contract with an option for an additional season with Volendam, joining the competition with Jordi van Stappershoef and Mitchel Michaelis to replace the departing Hobie Verhulst. He was initially a backup, mainly playing for the reserve team Jong Volendam in the Derde Divisie. On 1 December 2018, he scored his first ever goal, after a wind-assisted drop kick intended for striker Martijn Kaars sailed over the opposing goalkeeper and secured a 4–4 draw in 93rd minute against Quick '20.

Bakker only made his Eerste Divisie debut for the Volendam first team on 7 December 2018 in a game against Twente as a 10th-minute substitute for injured Michaelis.

Due to Van Stappershoef's departure to Bristol Rovers and another injury to Michaelis, Bakker became the first-choice goalkeeper for Volendam in the 2019–20 season, appearing in all matches. In the following season, he competed for the starting spot with Joey Roggeveen, who ended up playing one match fewer than Bakker. At the end of the season, Volendam decided not to renew the expiring contracts of both goalkeepers.

=== Beroe Stara Zagora ===
On 23 June 2021, Bakker joined Bulgarian First League club Beroe Stara Zagora. He made his debut for the club on 23 July, the opening day of the season, keeping a clean sheet in a 1–0 victory over Lokomotiv Sofia. He made eight appearances for the club, before losing his starting spot in September 2021 to Hennadiy Hanyev. He was released in January 2022 due to financial problems at Staroe.

=== Almere City ===
On 28 January 2022, Bakker signed a six-month contract with Almere City with an option to extend. He made his debut for De Zwarte Schapen two days later, replacing the injured Agil Etemadi in the 16th minute of a 0–0 league draw against Telstar. After his debut, he held on to his position as the starting goalkeeper, impressing with multiple clean sheets. On 8 March, the club exercised the option in his contract, keeping him in Almere until 2023.

The club announced on 17 May 2023, that Bakker's contract had been extended by another two years, keeping him in Almere until 2025. With Bakker in goal, Almere secured promotion to the Eredivisie for the first time in the 2022–23 after beating Emmen 4–1 in the play-off finals.

=== Heerenveen ===
On 6 August 2025, Bakker signed a 2-year contract with Heerenveen.

=== Midtjylland ===
On 1 July 2026, Bakker moved to Midtjylland in Denmark for three seasons.

== Career statistics ==
=== Club ===
As of match played 19 October 2026

Appearances and goals by club, season and competition
| Club | Season | League | | | Cup | | Europe | | Other | | Total | |
| Club | Season | Division | Apps | Goals | Apps | Goals | Apps | Goals | Apps | Goals | Apps | Goals |
|---|---|---|---|---|---|---|---|---|---|---|---|---|
| Jong Volendam | 2018–19 | Derde Divisie | 16 | 1 | — | | — | | — | | 16 | 1 |
| Volendam | 2018–19 | Eerste Divisie | 5 | 0 | 0 | 0 | — | | — | | 5 | 0 |
| Volendam | 2019–20 | Eerste Divisie | 29 | 0 | 1 | 0 | — | | — | | 30 | 0 |
| Volendam | 2020–21 | Eerste Divisie | 19 | 0 | 0 | 0 | — | | 1 | 0 | 20 | 0 |
| Volendam | Total | | 53 | 0 | 1 | 0 | — | | 1 | 0 | 55 | 0 |
| Beroe Stara Zagora | 2021–22 | First League | 8 | 0 | 1 | 0 | — | | — | | 9 | 0 |
| Almere City | 2021–22 | Eerste Divisie | 15 | 0 | — | | — | | — | | 15 | 0 |
| Almere City | 2022–23 | Eerste Divisie | 36 | 0 | 2 | 0 | — | | 6 | 0 | 44 | 0 |
| Almere City | 2023–24 | Eredivisie | 29 | 0 | 1 | 0 | — | | — | | 30 | 0 |
| Almere City | 2024–25 | Eredivisie | 34 | 0 | 1 | 0 | — | | — | | 35 | 0 |
| Almere City | Total | | 114 | 0 | 4 | 0 | — | | 6 | 0 | 124 | 0 |
| SC Heerenveen | 2025–24 | Eredivisie | 1 | 0 | 1 | 0 | — | | — | | 2 | 0 |
| Midtjylland | 2026–27 | Danish Superliga | 2 | 0 | 1 | 0 | 1 (Note: Appearances in UEFA Conference League) | 0 | — | | 4 | 0 |
| Career total | | | 194 | 0 | 8 | 0 | 1 | 0 | 7 | 0 | 210 | 0 |
