= Bradly van Hoeven =

Dutch footballer (born 2000)

Personal information
- Full name: Bradly Pieter van Hoeven
- Date of birth: 17 April 2000 (age 26)
- Place of birth: Maassluis, Netherlands
- Height: 1.74 m (5 ft 9 in)
- Position: Winger

Team information
- Current team: Livingston
- Number: 19

Youth career
- 2007–2009: Excelsior Maassluis
- 2009–2019: Sparta

Senior career*
Years	Team	Apps	(Gls)
2018–2021	Jong Sparta	43	(14)
2019–2021	Sparta	1	(0)
2020–2021	→ Go Ahead Eagles (loan)	33	(8)
2021–2024	Almere City	34	(2)
2023	→ TOP Oss (loan)	19	(1)
2024	→ Emmen (loan)	12	(2)
2024–2026	Motor Lublin	41	(2)
2026–	Livingston	12	(2)

International career
2014–2015	Netherlands U15	7	(0)
2015	Netherlands U16	3	(0)
2016–2017	Netherlands U17	10	(3)
2017	Netherlands U18	3	(0)
- * Club domestic league appearances and goals as of 25 October 2026

Bradly van Hoeven (born 17 April 2000) is a Dutch professional footballer who plays as a winger for Scottish Championship club Livingston.

== Club career ==
Born in Maassluis, Van Hoeven played in the youth departments of Excelsior Maassluis and Sparta Rotterdam. In 2018, he was moved to the Sparta reserve team, Jong Sparta, competing in the Tweede Divisie. He made his professional football debut for Sparta on 1 April 2019, in a 2–0 win over MVV Maastricht, coming on as a substitute for Ragnar Ache in the 89th minute. In June 2020, he joined Go Ahead Eagles on a season-long loan.

On 27 June 2021, van Hoeven moved to Eerste Divisie club Almere City FC. On 12 January 2023, he was sent on loan to TOP Oss. On 1 February 2024, van Hoeven was loaned by Emmen.

On 24 September 2024, van Hoeven joined Polish Ekstraklasa club Motor Lublin for the remainder of the season, with an option for a further year. He made his debut the following day as a second-half substitute in a 0–2 home loss to Jagiellonia Białystok. After van Hoeven became a regular starter following the winter break, Motor exercised their option on his contract in April 2025. On 10 June 2026, Motor announced they would not be extending van Hoeven's contract for the following season.

== Career statistics ==
As of match played 23 May 2026

Appearances and goals by club, season and competition
Club	Season	League			National cup (Note: Includes KNVB Cup, Polish Cup)		Europe		Other		Total	
Club	Season	Division	Apps	Goals	Apps	Goals	Apps	Goals	Apps	Goals	Apps	Goals
Sparta Rotterdam II	2018–19	Tweede Divisie	19	5	0	0	—		0	0	19	5
Sparta Rotterdam II	2019–20	Tweede Divisie	24	9	0	0	—		0	0	24	9
Sparta Rotterdam II	Total		43	14	0	0	0	0	0	0	43	14
Sparta Rotterdam	2018–19	Eerste Divisie	1	0	0	0	—		0	0	1	0
Go Ahead Eagles (loan)	2020–21	Eerste Divisie	33	8	2	1	—		0	0	35	9
Almere City	2021–22	Eerste Divisie	26	2	1	0	—		0	0	27	2
Almere City	2022–23	Eerste Divisie	8	0	0	0	—		0	0	8	0
Almere City	2023–24	Eredivisie	0	0	0	0	—		0	0	0	0
Almere City	Total		34	2	1	0	0	0	0	0	35	2
TOP Oss (loan)	2022–23	Eerste Divisie	19	1	0	0	—		0	0	19	1
Emmen (loan)	2023–24	Eerste Divisie	12	2	—		—		4 (Note: Appearances in Eredivisie promotion play-offs)	0	16	2
Motor Lublin	2024–25	Ekstraklasa	13	2	1	0	—		—		14	2
Motor Lublin	2025–26	Ekstraklasa	28	0	1	0	—		—		29	0
Motor Lublin	Total		41	2	2	0	—		—		43	2
Career total			183	28	5	1	0	0	4	0	192	29
