= Jorrit Smeets =

Dutch footballer

Personal information
- Date of birth: 25 March 1995 (age 31)
- Place of birth: Landgraaf, Netherlands
- Height: 1.74 m (5 ft 9 in)
- Position: Midfielder

Youth career
- VV Schaesberg
- –2014: Roda JC Kerkrade

Senior career*
Years	Team	Apps	(Gls)
2014–2016	Roda JC	0	(0)
2016–2021	Fortuna Sittard	115	(4)
2021–2023	Almere City	52	(0)
2023–2024	Emmen	23	(1)
- * Club domestic league appearances and goals

Jorrit Smeets (born 25 March 1995) is a Dutch former footballer.

== Club career ==
Smeets made his professional debut in the Eerste Divisie for Fortuna Sittard on 26 September 2016 in a game against Jong PSV.

On 1 February 2021, Smeets signed with Dutch club Almere City.

On 26 August 2023, Smeets joined Emmen with a one-year contract.
