= Théo Barbet =

French footballer (born 2001)

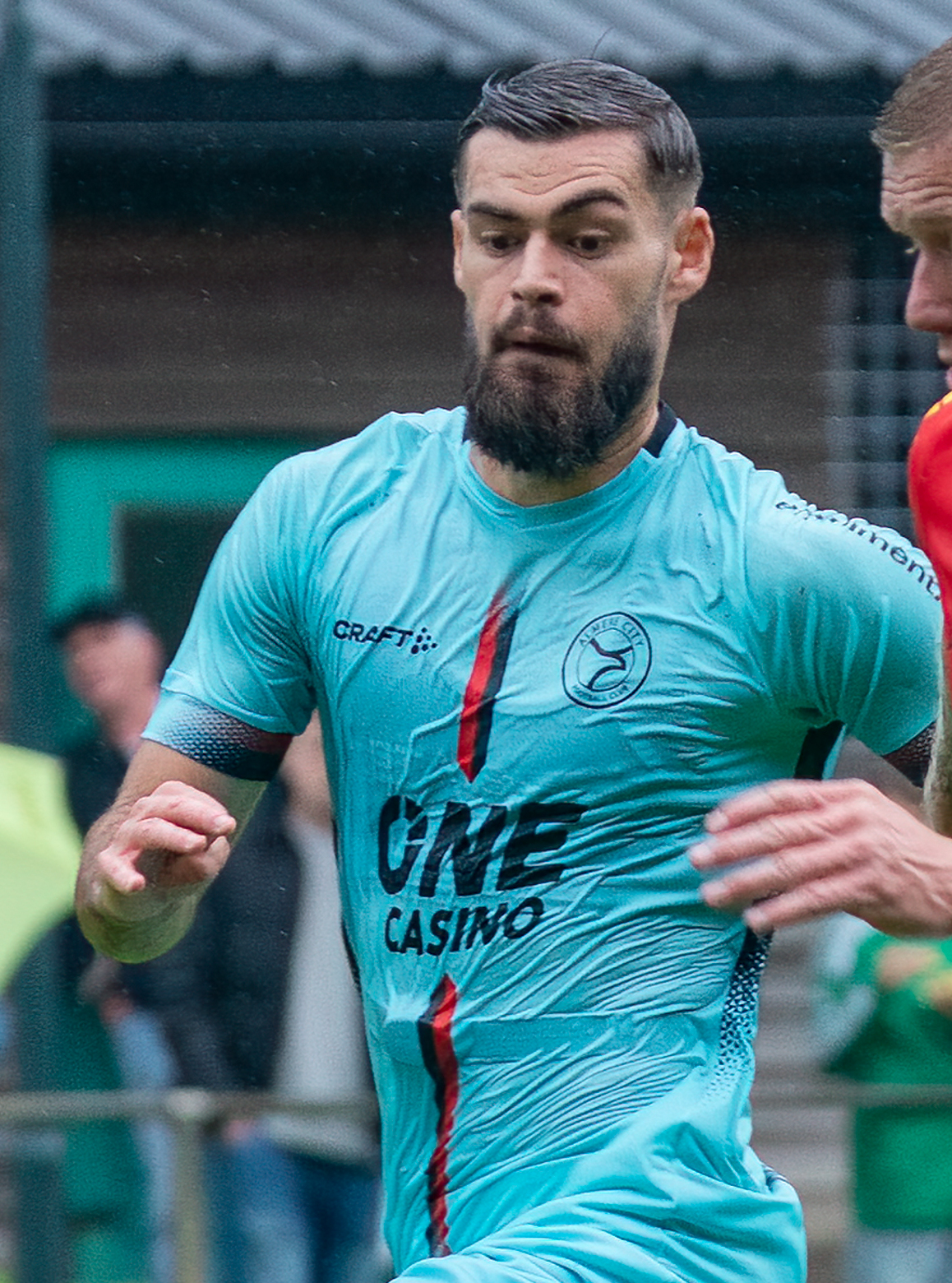

Personal information
- Date of birth: 6 March 2001 (age 25)
- Place of birth: Mâcon, France
- Position: Defender

Team information
- Current team: Lausanne Ouchy
- Number: 22

Youth career
- Dijon

Senior career*
Years	Team	Apps	(Gls)
2017–2021	Dijon	0	(0)
2017–2020	Dijon B	24	(5)
2020–2021	→ FC Borgo (loan)	21	(0)
2021–2022	Lokomotiva Zagreb	0	(0)
2022–2025	Almere City	75	(0)
2025–	Lausanne Ouchy	21	(0)
- * Club domestic league appearances and goals as of 26 May 2026

Théo Barbet (born 6 March 2001) is a French professional footballer who plays as a defender for Lausanne Ouchy.

== Career ==
Barbet started his career with French Ligue 1 side Dijon. In 2020, he was sent on loan to FC Borgo in the French third tier. In 2021, Barbet signed for Croatian club Lokomotiva.

In 2022, he signed for Almere City in the Netherlands. On 12 August 2022, he debuted for Almere City during a 3–0 win over TOP Oss.
