= Joey Jacobs (footballer) =

Dutch footballer (born 2000)

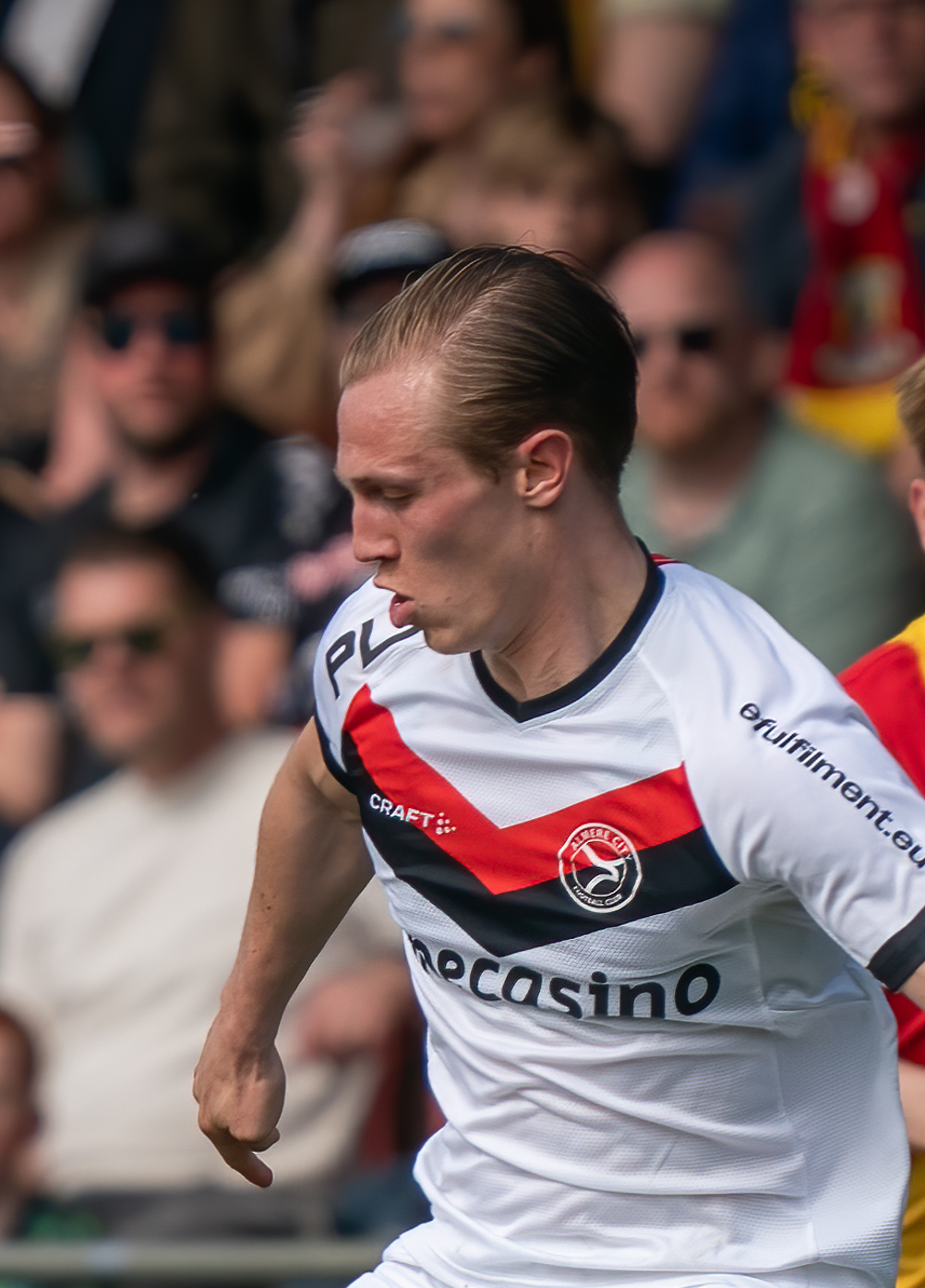

Personal information
- Date of birth: 10 April 2000 (age 26)
- Place of birth: Purmerend, Netherlands
- Height: 1.83 m (6 ft 0 in)
- Position: Defender

Team information
- Current team: Almere City
- Number: 3

Youth career
- –2018: AZ

Senior career*
Years	Team	Apps	(Gls)
2018–2022	Jong AZ	65	(0)
2022–	Almere City	105	(5)

International career^{‡}
2015	Netherlands U15	2	(0)
2016	Netherlands U16	1	(0)
2017	Netherlands U18	1	(1)
2017	Netherlands U20	1	(0)
- * Club domestic league appearances and goals as of 25 April 2026 ‡ National team caps and goals as of 12:05, 1 June 2020 (UTC)

Joey Jacobs (born 10 April 2000) is a Dutch professional footballer who plays as a defender for Eerste Divisie club Almere City.

== Club career ==
Jacobs made his Eerste Divisie debut for Jong AZ on 12 October 2018 as a second-half substitute in a 2–2 draw with Jong FC Utrecht.

On 11 January 2022, Jacobs signed a two-and-a-half-year contract with Almere City.

== International career ==
He has played internationally for the Netherlands at under-15, under-16, under-18 and under-20 level.

== Personal life ==
He is the brother of fellow professional footballer Jamie Jacobs.
