= Hamdi Akujobi =

Dutch footballer (born 2000)

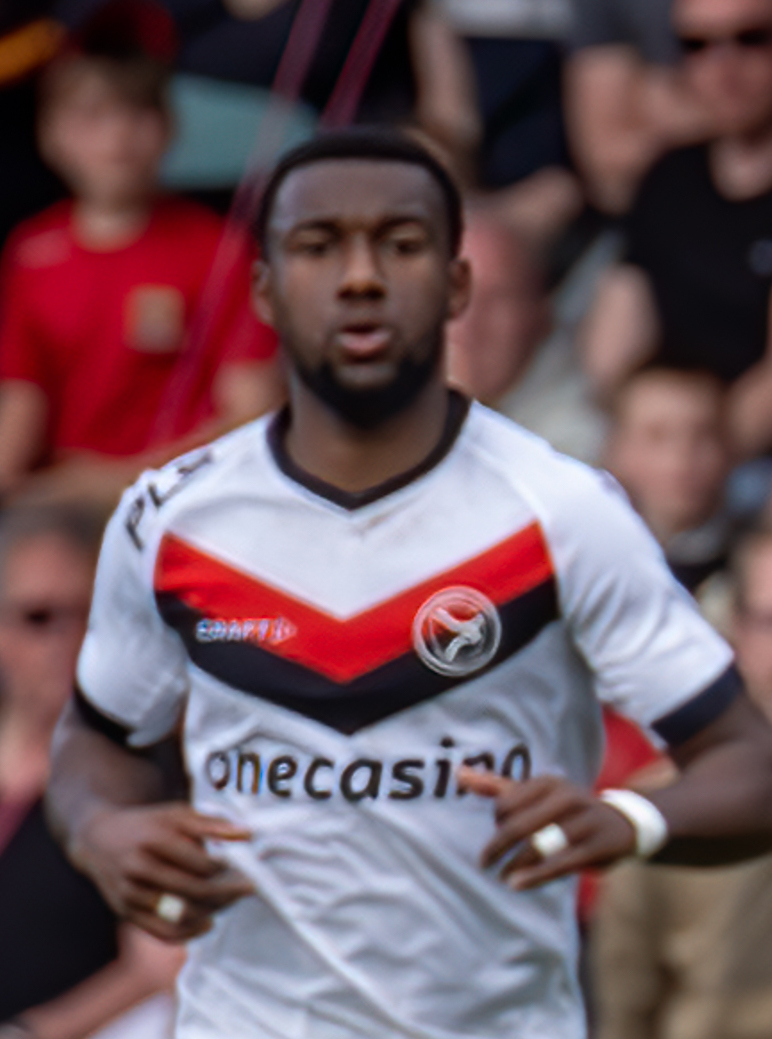

Personal information
- Full name: Hamdi Jobi Akujobi
- Date of birth: 20 January 2000 (age 26)
- Place of birth: Rotterdam, Netherlands
- Height: 1.75 m (5 ft 9 in)
- Position: Right-back

Team information
- Current team: Excelsior
- Number: 22

Youth career
- –2013: Feyenoord
- 2013–2018: Spartaan '20
- 2018–2019: Heerenveen

Senior career*
| Years | Team | Apps | (Gls) |
| 2019–2022 | Heerenveen | 14 | (0) |
| 2022–2025 | Almere City | 85 | (6) |
| 2026– | Excelsior | 0 | (0) |
- * Club domestic league appearances and goals as of 02:32, 14 March 2026 (UTC)

Hamdi Jobi Akujobi (born 20 January 2000) is a Dutch professional footballer who plays as a right-back for Eredivisie club Excelsior.

== Professional career ==
On 25 April 2019, Akujobi signed his first professional contract with SC Heerenveen for three years. Akujobi made his professional debut with Heerenven in a 4–0 Eredivisie win over Heracles Almelo on 4 August 2019.

Akujobi joined Eerste Divisie club Almere City on 10 July 2022, signing a two-year contract with an option for an additional year.

== International career ==
Born in the Netherlands, Akujobi is of Nigerian descent. He was called up for the preliminary Nigeria national under-20 football team for the 2019 FIFA U-20 World Cup.

== Honours ==
Individual

- Eerste Divisie Team of the Year: 2022–23
