= Yanmar Stadion =

Stadium in Almere, Netherlands

Yanmar Hanasaka Stadion
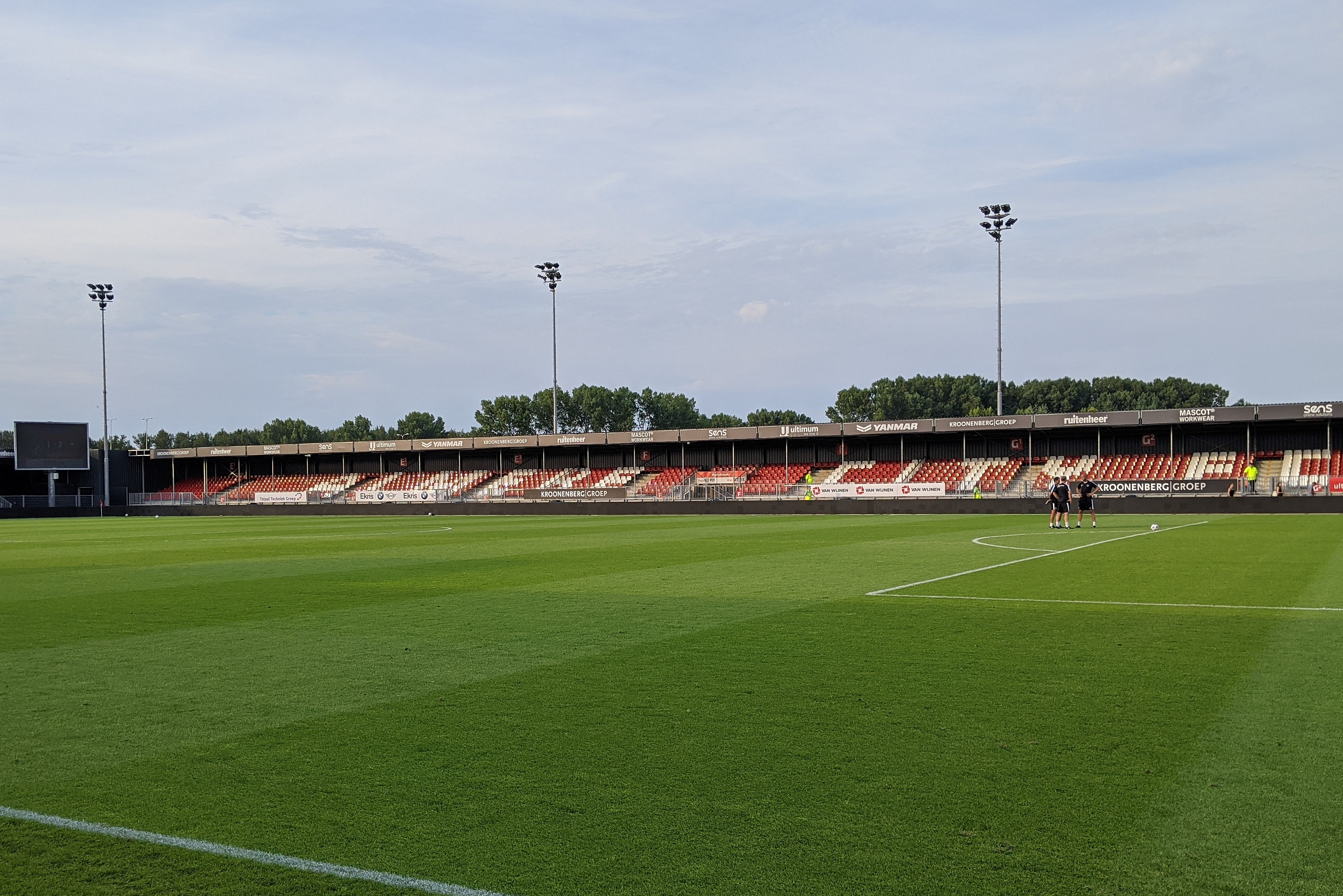
- View of Yanmar Hanasaka Stadion in 2020
- Interactive map of Yanmar Hanasaka Stadion
- Former names: Mitsubishi Forkliftstadion (2005–2013); Almere City Stadion (2013–2015); Yanmar Stadion (2015–2026); Yanmar Hanasaka Stadion (2026–present)
- Location: Competitieweg 20; 1318 EA Almere
- Coordinates: 52°23′40″N 5°14′26″E
- Owner: Almere City FC
- Capacity: 4,501
- Surface: Grass
- Field size: 105 by 68 metres (114.8 yd × 74.4 yd)

Construction
- Opened: 2005
- Expanded: 2019–2020

Tenant
- Almere City FC

Yanmar Hanasaka Stadion (formerly Mitsubishi Forkliftstadion, Almere City Stadion and Yanmar Stadion) is a multi-purpose stadium in Almere, Netherlands. The stadium primarily hosts association football matches and is the home ground of Almere City FC. The stadium was built in 2005 with a capacity of 3,000 spectators. In January 2020, the club completed a new grandstand, increasing the capacity to 4,501. The grandstand affords covered passages to the main club building, as well as to the new club offices which were completed in spring of 2020.

Once the stadium was used for American football. It is named after Japanese sponsor Yanmar. "Hanasaka" was added to the name in 2026 after the renovations were finished. Hanasaka is a Japanese term for "passing on knowledge, experience, and opportunities to the next generation, so that they can continue to develop and ultimately flourish themselves". In European competitions, the stadium is known as Almere City FC Stadion due to advertising rules.
