= Thomas Poll =

Dutch footballer (born 2001)

Personal information
- Date of birth: 28 August 2001 (age 25)
- Place of birth: Amsterdam, Netherlands
- Height: 1.84 m (6 ft 0 in)
- Position: Left-back

Team information
- Current team: Helmond Sport
- Number: 5

Youth career
- 2013–2014: VV Eenrum
- 2014–2016: VV Winsum
- 2016–2020: Groningen

Senior career*
Years	Team	Apps	(Gls)
2018–2019	Jong Groningen (Note: Jong FC Groningen was the reserve team of FC Groningen from 2002 to 2019.)	2	(0)
2020–2021	Groningen	6	(0)
2021	→ Dordrecht (loan)	18	(0)
2021–2024	Almere City	55	(2)
2023–2024	→ Cambuur (loan)	25	(0)
2024–2025	Cambuur	31	(2)
2025–	Helmond Sport	34	(1)
- * Club domestic league appearances and goals as of 28 April 2026

Thomas Poll (born 28 August 2001) is a Dutch professional footballer who plays for as a left-back for Eerste Divisie club Helmond Sport.

== Career ==
=== Groningen ===
Born in Amsterdam, Poll moved with his family to Wehe-den Hoorn, Province of Groningen when he was 8 years old. He initially joined VV Eenrum and moved to VV Winsum only one year later. At the age of 14, Poll was admitted to the FC Groningen youth academy, and progressed through the youth teams.

He made his professional debut on 28 February 2020 as a starter in the Eredivisie match against Willem II. Groningen lost 1–3.

On 9 October 2020, Poll signed a new contract with Groningen until 2022. Three months later, he was sent on loan to Dordrecht for the remainder of the 2020–21 season. He made 18 appearances during his loan, making two assists.

=== Almere City ===
On 31 August 2021, Poll signed a three-year contract with Eerste Divisie club Almere City. He made his debut on 10 September, coming on as a half-time substitute for Thibaut Lesquoy in a 1–1 draw against Telstar.

Poll scored his first goal on senior level against Jong AZ in stoppage time after coming on as a substitute for Lance Duijvestijn on 22 August 2022. On 30 September, he scored the late 2–1 winner in a league game against Roda JC Kerkrade.

=== Cambuur ===
On 1 September 2023, Poll signed a two-year contract with Cambuur. The first year of the contract was a loan, followed by a permanent transfer for the 2024–25 season.

== Personal life ==
He is of Indonesian descent through his grandfather, who is from Kawedanan Jonggol, Bogor, West Java.

== Career statistics ==
As of match played 21 December 2025

Appearances and goals by club, season and competition
Club	Season	League			National cup		Continental		Other		Total	
Club	Season	Division	Apps	Goals	Apps	Goals	Apps	Goals	Apps	Goals	Apps	Goals
Jong Groningen	2018–19	Derde Divisie	2	0	—		—		—		2	0
Groningen	2019–20	Eredivisie	2	0	0	0	—		—		2	0
Groningen	2020–21	Eredivisie	4	0	0	0	—		—		4	0
Groningen	Total		6	0	0	0	—		—		6	0
Dordrecht (loan)	2020–21	Eerste Divisie	18	0	0	0	—		—		18	0
Almere City	2021–22	Eerste Divisie	30	0	1	0	—		—		31	0
Almere City	2022–23	Eerste Divisie	25	2	2	1	—		4 (Note: Appearances in Eredivisie promotion/relegation playoffs)	0	31	3
Almere City	Total		55	2	3	1	—		4	0	62	3
Cambuur (loan)	2023–24	Eerste Divisie	25	0	4	0	—		—		29	0
Cambuur	2024–25	Eerste Divisie	31	2	0	0	—		—		31	2
Cambuur	Total		56	2	4	0	—		—		60	2
Helmond Sport	2025–26	Eerste Divisie	20	1	0	0	—		—		20	1
Career total			157	5	7	1	—		4	0	168	6
