= Pascu (footballer) =

Spanish footballer (born 2000)

Personal information
- Full name: José Pascual Alba Seva
- Date of birth: 2 April 2000 (age 26)
- Place of birth: Santa Pola, Spain
- Height: 1.84 m (6 ft 0 in)
- Position: Midfielder

Team information
- Current team: Racing Ferrol
- Number: 10

Senior career*
Years	Team	Apps	(Gls)
2018–2020	Valencia Mestalla	54	(2)
2020–2021	ADO Den Haag	13	(0)
2021–2022	Dordrecht	37	(1)
2022–2024	Almere City	40	(4)
2024–2025	Arenteiro	37	(8)
2025–	Racing Ferrol	35	(5)

International career
2018	Spain U18	4	(0)
- * Club domestic league appearances and goals as of 9 June 2026

José Pascual Alba Seva (born 2 April 2000), better known as Pascu, is a Spanish professional footballer who plays as a midfielder for Primera Federación club Racing Ferrol.

== Club career ==
Pascu is a youth product of Valencia CF, and signed with ADO Den Haag on 24 August 2020. He made his professional debut with ADO Den Haag in a 4–2 Eredivisie loss to Feyenoord on 27 September 2020.

On 9 July 2021, he joined Dordrecht in the Dutch second-tier Eerste Divisie. After a successful season in which he made 37 appearances and scored once, Pascu signed a two-year contract with an option of an additional year with league rivals Almere City. He was released by the club at the end of the 2023–24 season.

== International career ==
Pascu is a youth international for Spain, having represented the Spain U18s at the 2018 Mediterranean Games.
