= Milan Corryn =

Belgian footballer (born 1999)

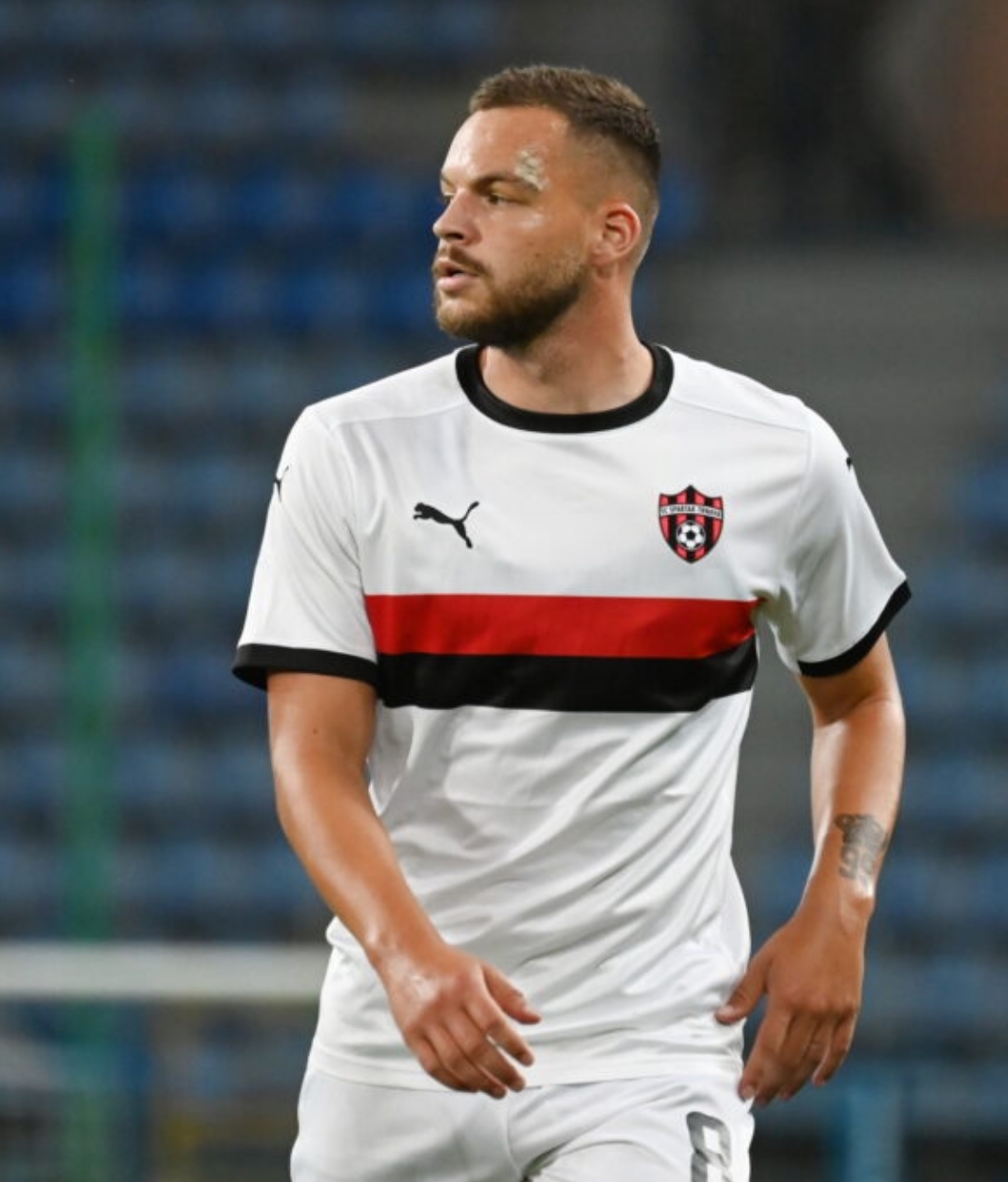
- Corryn with Spartak Trnava (2024)

Personal information
- Date of birth: 4 April 1999 (age 27)
- Place of birth: Brussels, Belgium
- Height: 1.80 m (5 ft 11 in)
- Position: Midfielder

Team information
- Current team: FK Grobiņa
- Number: 6

Youth career
- 2007–2017: Anderlecht

Senior career*
Years	Team	Apps	(Gls)
2017–2018	Anderlecht Reserves		
2018–2021	AS Trenčín	66	(7)
2021–2022	Warta Poznań	29	(3)
2023–2024	Almere City	16	(0)
2024–2025	Spartak Trnava	8	(0)
2026	Crossing Schaerbeek	5	(2)
2026–	FK Grobiņa	15	(5)

International career
2015–2016	Belgium U17	10	(2)
2017–2018	Belgium U19	5	(1)
- * Club domestic league appearances and goals as of 12 November 2026

Milan Corryn (born 4 April 1999) is a Belgian professional footballer who plays as a midfielder for Latvian club FK Grobiņa.

== Club career ==
=== Anderlecht ===
Corryn, originally from Gooik but born in Aalst, joined the youth team of RSC Anderlecht at the age of eight, who picked him up from the youth team of FCV Dender. In 2017, he graduated as Purple Talent, a project in which Anderlecht guides young players both on and off the field. Corryn was a regular in Anderlecht's reserve team in the 2017/18 season, which earned him a contract until 2020 in December 2017.

=== Trenčín ===
In 2018, Coryyn left Anderlecht to join Slovak first division side AS Trencin. He made his debut for his new club on 15 September in a 2:0 win over Senica. On 8 December, he scored his first goal for Trencin in a 3:1 loss to Spartak Trnava. On 1 June 2019, he scored in a 4–1 win in the relegation play-off second leg, a 4–1 win over FK Poprad. After this win, Trenčín remained in the top flight.

In the 2020–21 season, he played 31 matches and scored five goals in all competitions

=== Warta Poznań ===
On 26 June 2021, he signed a two-year contract with an option for a one-year extension with Polish Ekstraklasa club Warta Poznań. He made his Ekstraklasa debut on 25 July in a 2–2 draw with Śląsk Wrocław. In his third match, he scored his first two goals in a 4–0 win over Gornik Leczna. On 3 December 2022, it was announced that his contract with the club was terminated by mutual consent.

=== Almere City ===
On 16 January 2023, Corryn signed a 1.5-year contract with Almere City in the Netherlands. He made his debut for the club on 3 February in a 1–2 loss to Jong PSV. At the end of the season, he enjoyed promotion to the Eredivisie with the team.

He made his debut in the Dutch top flight on 17 December 2023 in a 5–0 win over Vitesse Arnhem. He only played nine matches that season, seven of which came from the bench.

=== Spartak Trnava ===
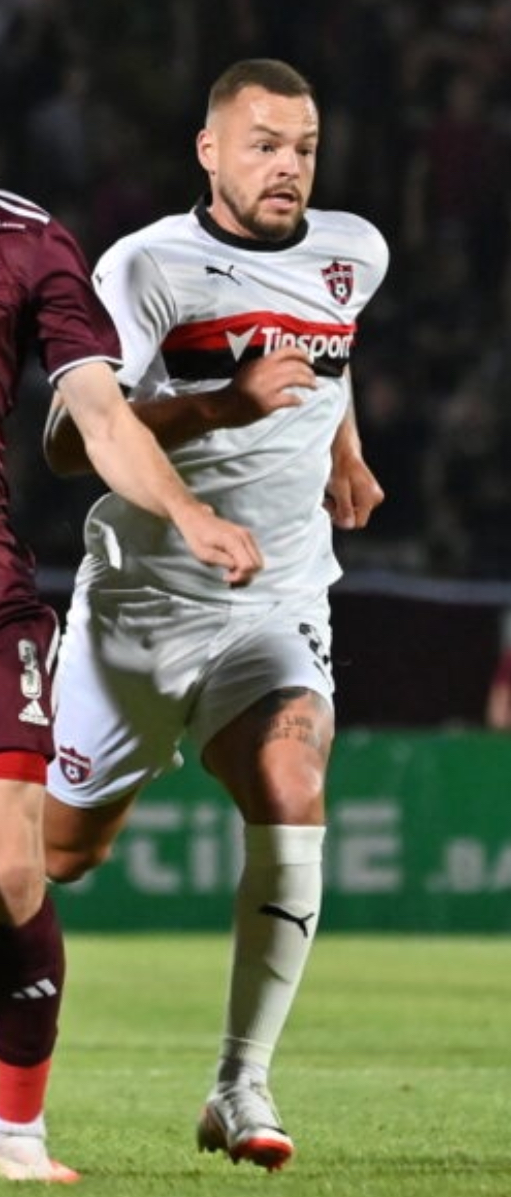
Corryn playing against FK Sarajevo.

On June 28, 2024, Corryn signed a two-year contract with Slovak club Spartak Trnava. He made his debut for Spartak in a 0:0 draw against FK Sarajevo in the 1st round of qualification to the Conference League. He started the game and came out for Jakub Paur in the 57” minute.

On 31 July 2025, it was announced that Corryn would be leaving the club following the termination of his contract.

== Honors ==
Spartak Trnava

- Slovak Cup: 2024–25
