= 2022–23 SC Heerenveen season =

Season of a Dutch football club

SC Heerenveen
2022–23 season
- Chairman: Cees Roozemond
- Head coach: Kees van Wonderen
- Stadium: Abe Lenstra Stadion
- Eredivisie: 8th
- KNVB Cup: Quarter-finals
- Top goalscorer: League: Sydney van Hooijdonk (16); All: Sydney van Hooijdonk (19)
Home colours	Away colours

The 2022–23 season was the 103rd season in the history of SC Heerenveen and their 30th consecutive season in the top flight. The club participated in the Eredivisie and the KNVB Cup.

The club finished the Eredivisie in eighth place and reached the quarter-finals of the KNVB Cup, where they were defeated by Feyenoord.

== Players ==
As of 26 July 2022

Note: Flags indicate national team as defined under FIFA eligibility rules; some limited exceptions apply. Players may hold more than one non-FIFA nationality.

No.	Pos.	Nation	Player
1	GK	NED	Xavier Mous
3	DF	NED	Joost van Aken
4	DF	NED	Sven van Beek
5	DF	POL	Paweł Bochniewicz
6	DF	NED	Syb van Ottele
7	FW	GER	Mats Köhlert
8	FW	SWE	Alex Timossi Andersson
9	FW	SWE	Amin Sarr
10	MF	CRO	Tibor Halilović (vice-captain)
11	FW	NED	Arjen van der Heide

No.	Pos.	Nation	Player
13	DF	TUN	Rami Kaib
15	DF	IRQ	Hussein Ali
17	FW	NED	Sydney van Hooijdonk (on loan from Bologna)
21	MF	NED	Djenahro Nunumete
22	MF	SWE	Rami Al Hajj
23	GK	NED	Jan Bekkema
26	MF	MAR	Anas Tahiri
27	DF	NED	Milan van Ewijk
33	MF	NED	Thom Haye
34	DF	NED	Timo Zaal
44	GK	NED	Andries Noppert

=== On loan ===
Note: Flags indicate national team as defined under FIFA eligibility rules; some limited exceptions apply. Players may hold more than one non-FIFA nationality.

No.	Pos.	Nation	Player
—	DF	URU	Joaquín Fernández (on loan to Atenas de San Carlos until 31 December 2022)

== Pre-season and friendlies ==
Win Draw Loss Fixtures

5 July 2022 Friendly	Heerenveen (Netherlands)	4–1	(Netherlands) TOP Oss	Witmarsum
19:00 CEST (UTC+2)	Haye 2'; Al Hajj 9'; Van Beek 41'; Beelen 71'		Tejan 90+1'	Stadium: Sportpark It Fliet

8 July 2022 Friendly	Heerenveen (Netherlands)	0–1	(Netherlands) Utrecht	Jubbega
17:15 CEST (UTC+2)		Report	Van der Hoorn 90+1'	Stadium: Sportpark 't Heidefjild; Attendance: 1,500

15 July 2022 Friendly	PEC Zwolle (Netherlands)	0–1	(Netherlands) Heerenveen	Zwolle
18:30 CEST (UTC+2)	Van Hintum (yellow card)	Report	Sarr 54'; Bochniewicz (yellow card)	Stadium: MAC³PARK Stadion; Attendance: 3,800; Referee: Timmer
Note: Match was played in two 37.5-minute halves.

15 July 2022 Friendly	PEC Zwolle (Netherlands)	0–1	(Netherlands) Heerenveen	Zwolle
--:-- CEST (UTC+2)		Report	Kaib 38'; Nunumete (yellow card)	Stadium: MAC³PARK Stadion; Attendance: 3,800; Referee: Timmer
Note: Match was one period of 60 minutes.

22 July 2022 Friendly	Heerenveen (Netherlands)	1–1	(Belgium) RWDM	Putten
18:00 CEST (UTC+2)	Halilović 30'	Report	Smeets 5'	Stadium: Sportpark Putter Eng

30 July 2022 Friendly	Heerenveen (Netherlands)	3–1	(Netherlands) Excelsior	Heerenveen
19:00 CEST (UTC+2)	Van Aken 45', 85'; Sarr 47'	Report	Admiraal 73'	Stadium: Abe Lenstra Stadion

22 September 2022 Friendly	Heerenveen (Netherlands)	1–0	(Belgium) Cercle Brugge	Roosendaal, Netherlands
	Al Hajj (?)	Report

6 December 2022 Friendly	Genk (Belgium)	3–1	(Netherlands) Heerenveen	Belgium
12:00 CET (UTC+1)	Samatta 40'; Castro 66'; Onuachu 80' (pen.)		Colassin 30'	Attendance: 0

14 December 2022 Friendly	Gent (Belgium)	4–1	(Netherlands) Heerenveen	Oliva, Spain
14:00 CET (UTC+1)	Cuypers 41', 45+2'; Salah 50'; Fofana 89'		Van Hooijdonk 48'	Stadium: Oliva Nova Golf & Beach Resort Campo 1

== Competitions ==
=== Overall record ===
Competition	First match	Last match	Starting round	Final position	Record							
Competition	First match	Last match	Starting round	Final position	Pld	W	D	L	GF	GA	GD	Win %
Eredivisie	5 August 2022	28 May 2023	Matchday 1	8th	28	10	8	10	34	38	−4	35.71
KNVB Cup	18 October 2022	1 March 2023	First round	Quarter-finals	4	3	0	1	8	4	+4	75.00
Total					32	13	8	11	42	42	+0	40.63

Last updated: April 2023
Source: Competitions

=== Eredivisie ===
==== League table ====
Pos	Team	Pld	W	D	L	GF	GA	GD	Pts	Qualification or relegation
6	Sparta Rotterdam	34	17	8	9	60	37	+23	59	Qualification to European competition play-offs
7	Utrecht	34	15	9	10	55	50	+5	54	Qualification to European competition play-offs
8	Heerenveen	34	12	10	12	44	50	−6	46	Qualification to European competition play-offs
9	RKC Waalwijk	34	11	8	15	50	64	−14	41	
10	Vitesse	34	10	10	14	45	50	−5	40	

Source: Eredivisie
Rules for classification: Season in progress: 1) Most points won; 2) Less points lost; 3) Goal difference; 4) Goals scored; 5) Alphabetical order; End of season: 1) Points; 2) Goal difference; 3) Goals scored; 4) Head-to-head points; 5) Head-to-head goal difference; 6) Head-to-head away goals scored; 7) Play-off if relevant for deciding champion, relegation or participating in a European league, otherwise by draw. 8) Penalty shoot-out (only after a play-off)

==== Results summary ====
Overall								Home						Away					
Pld	W	D	L	GF	GA	GD	Pts	W	D	L	GF	GA	GD	W	D	L	GF	GA	GD
22	8	6	8	23	25	−2	30	4	2	5	12	14	−2	4	4	3	11	11	0

Last updated: 19 February 2023.
Source: Eredivisie

==== Results by round ====
Round	1	2	3	4	5	6	7	8	9	10	11	12	13	14	15	16	17	18	19	20	21	22	23
Ground	H	A	A	H	H	A	H	A	H	A	A	H	A	H	A	H	H	A	H	A	H	A	H
Result	D	D	W	W	D	L	W	D	L	D	W	L	W	W	D	L	W	L	L	L	L	W	
Position	11	10	7	6	6	6	6	6	8	8	8	8	8	8	8	8	7	8	8	8	8	8	

Updated to match(es) played on 19 February 2023. Source: Eredivisie
A = Away; H = Home; W = Win; D = Draw; L = Loss

==== Matches ====
The league fixtures were announced on 17 June 2022.

5 August 2022 1	Heerenveen	0–0	Sparta Rotterdam	Heerenveen
20:00 CEST (UTC+2)	van Hooijdonk (yellow card) 25'	Report	Verschueren (yellow card) 49'	Stadium: Abe Lenstra Stadion; Attendance: 18.000; Referee: Pol van Boekel

13 August 2022 2	Feyenoord	0–0	Heerenveen	Rotterdam
21:00 CEST (UTC+2)	Q. Timber (yellow card) 79'	Report	Köhlert (yellow card) 45+3'; Noppert (yellow card) 90+7'	Stadium: De Kuip; Attendance: 47.500; Referee: Serdar Gözübüyük

20 August 2022 3	Vitesse	0–4	Heerenveen	Arnhem
16:30 CEST (UTC+2)	Domgjoni (yellow card) 36'; Wittek (yellow card) 43'; Bero (yellow card) 86'	Report	van Hooijdonk 5', 72', 77'; Tahiri (yellow card) 36'; A. Sarr 45+3'; Thom Haye (yellow card) 69'	Stadium: GelreDome; Attendance: 10.899; Referee: Joey Kooij

27 August 2022 4	Heerenveen	2–1	Fortuna Sittard	Heerenveen
CEST (UTC+2)	van Hooijdonk 22'; van Ewijk 44'; van Aken (yellow card) 83'	Report	Yılmaz 84' (pen.), (yellow card) 90+1'	Stadium: Abe Lenstra Stadion; Attendance: 18.020; Referee: Dennis Higler

4 September 2022 5	Heerenveen	0–0	NEC	Heerenveen
14:30 CEST (UTC+2)	Halilović (red card) 62'; Haye (yellow card) 79'	Report	El Karouani (yellow card) 87'	Stadium: Abe Lenstra Stadion; Attendance: 18.066; Referee: Jochem Kamphuis

10 September 2022 6	Ajax	5–0	Heerenveen	Amsterdam
18:45 CEST (UTC+2)	Klaassen 4'; Taylor 16'; Álvarez (yellow card) 45'; Kudus 48', 59'; Brobbey 70'	Report	van Beek (yellow card) 15'; Bochniewicz (yellow card) 71'	Stadium: Johan Cruijff ArenA; Attendance: 49.555; Referee: Edwin van de Graaf

18 September 2022 7	Heerenveen	2–1	Twente	Heerenveen
14:30 CEST (UTC+2)	van Ewijk 28'; Bochniewicz 36'; Tahiri (yellow card) 55'; A. Sarr (penalty missed) 69'; Kaib (yellow card) 79'; van Ottele (yellow card) 90+6'	Report	Misidjan 2'; Smal (yellow card) 14'; Pröpper (yellow card) 15'	Stadium: Abe Lenstra Stadion; Attendance: 21.039; Referee: Jeroen Manschot

2 October 2022 8	Emmen	0–0	Heerenveen	Emmen
20:00 CEST (UTC+2)	Diemers (yellow card) 74'	Report		Stadium: De Oude Meerdijk; Attendance: 8.131; Referee: Allard Lindhout

9 October 2022 9	Heerenveen	0–1	PSV	Heerenveen
16:45 CEST (UTC+2)	van Ottele (yellow card) 52'; Colassin (yellow card) 89'	Report	Gakpo 75'	Stadium: Abe Lenstra Stadion; Attendance: 24.087; Referee: Bas Nijhuis

15 October 2022 10	Go Ahead Eagles	1–1	Heerenveen	Deventer
20:00 CEST (UTC+2)	Adekanye (yellow card) 30'; Llansana (yellow card) 74'; Stokkers 90+2'	Report	Haye 52', (yellow card) 87'	Stadium: De Adelaarshorst; Attendance: 9.713; Referee: Dennis Higler

23 October 2022 11	Volendam	1–3	Heerenveen	Volendam
20:00 CEST (UTC+2)	Mühren 43'; Benamar (yellow card) 45+7'; van Mieghem (yellow card) 71'	Report	Haye (yellow card) 8'; van Hooijdonk 24'; Olsson (yellow card) 50'; Bochniewicz (yellow card) 58'; Köhlert 85'; Sarr 87'	Stadium: Kras Stadion; Attendance: 6,600; Referee: Edwin van de Graaf

29 October 2022 12	Heerenveen	1–2	Utrecht	Heerenveen
16:30 CEST (UTC+2)	van Hooijdonk 33'; Tahiri (yellow card) 45+1'; Haye (yellow card) 81'	Report	Douvikas 44'; Toornstra (yellow card) 58'; Sagnan 66'; van de Streek (yellow card) 77'; Brouwers (yellow card) 77'; Boussaid (yellow card) 87'	Stadium: Abe Lenstra Stadion; Attendance: 22,150; Referee: Jeroen Manschot

5 November 2022 13	Excelsior	0–1	Heerenveen	Rotterdam
21:00 CET (UTC+1)		Report	van Ewijk 58'; Colassin (yellow card) 90+6'	Stadium: Van Donge & De Roo Stadion; Attendance: 4,400; Referee: Robin Hensgens

13 November 2022 14	Heerenveen	2–1	Cambuur	Heerenveen
14:30 CET (UTC+1)	van Beek (yellow card) 33'; van Hooijdonk (yellow card) 33'; Sarr 36'; Tahiri 81' (yellow card) 82'	Report	Jacobs 10'; Bergsma (yellow card) 38'; Bangura (yellow card) 90'	Stadium: Abe Lenstra Stadion; Attendance: 23,800; Referee: Allard Lindhout

7 January 2023 15	RKC Waalwijk	0–0	Heerenveen	Waalwijk
16:30 CET (UTC+1)	Adewoye (yellow card) 40'	Report	Haye (yellow card) 26'	Stadium: Mandemakers Stadion; Attendance: 6,143; Referee: Edwin van de Graaf

14 January 2023 16	Heerenveen	0–2	AZ	Heerenveen
18:45 CET (UTC+1)		Report	de Wit 33'; Reijnders 46' (yellow card) 59'; Sugawara (yellow card) 54'; Karlsson (yellow card) 68'	Stadium: Abe Lenstra Stadion; Attendance: 20,019; Referee: Serdar Gözübüyük

22 January 2023 17	Heerenveen	3–1	Groningen	Heerenveen
12:15 CET (UTC+1)	Sarr 5', 82'; van Amersfoort 81'	Report	Krüger 40'; van Gelderen (yellow card) 66'; Sørensen (yellow card) 72'; Suslov (yellow card) 76'	Stadium: Abe Lenstra Stadion; Attendance: 19,029; Referee: Allard Lindhout

25 January 2023 18	Fortuna Sittard	2–0	Heerenveen	Sittard
20:00 CET (UTC+1)	Umaro Embaló 58'; Cox (yellow card) 88'; Yılmaz 90+8' (pen.)	Report	Sarr (yellow card) 72'	Stadium: Fortuna Sittard Stadion; Attendance: 7,689; Referee: Jannick van der Laan

28 January 2023 19	Heerenveen	1–3	Vitesse	Heerenveen
20:00 CET (UTC+1)	van Amersfoort 21'; Halilović (yellow card) 88'	Report	Białek 32'; Vidović 45'; Manhoef 47'	Stadium: Abe Lenstra Stadion; Attendance: 20,152; Referee: Joey Kooij

4 February 2023 20	Utrecht	1–0	Heerenveen	Utrecht
20:00 CET (UTC+1)	Douvikas 69' (pen.); Toornstra (yellow card) 84'	Report	Bochniewicz (yellow card) 66'; van Ottele (yellow card) 86'	Stadium: Stadion Galgenwaard; Attendance: 19,444; Referee: Jeroen Manschot

12 February 2023 21	Heerenveen	1–2	Feyenoord	Heerenveen
14:30 CET (UTC+1)	van Ottele 75'; Köhlert (yellow card) 89'	Report	Geertruida 22'; Giménez 34'; Kökçü (yellow card) 79'	Stadium: Abe Lenstra Stadion; Attendance: 18,400; Referee: Jochem Kamphuis

19 February 2023 22	Cambuur	1–2	Heerenveen	Leeuwarden
12:15 CET (UTC+1)	Johnsen 1'; Paulissen (yellow card) 36'; van der Water (yellow card) 81'; Mahi (yellow card) 90+1'	Report	Sahraoui 22'; van Ewijk 65'	Stadium: Cambuur Stadion; Attendance: 10,000; Referee: Danny Makkelie

25 February 2023 23	Heerenveen	1–4	RKC Waalwijk	Heerenveen
18:45 CET (UTC+1)	van Hooijdonk 35'	Report	Jozefzoon 61', 94'; Lelieveld 75'; Oukili 77'	Stadium: Abe Lenstra Stadion; Attendance: 20,109

4 March 2023 24	FC Twente	3–3	Heerenveen	Enschede
21:00	Robin Pröpper 34'; Manfred Ugalde 48'; Václav Černý 55'	Report	Mees Hilgers 25' (o.g.); Milan van Ewijk 59'; Rami Kaib 90'	Stadium: De Grolsch Veste; Attendance: 29,500; Referee: Dennis Higler

12 March 2023 25	Heerenveen	2–4	Ajax	Heerenveen
14:30	Pelle van Amersfoort 42' van Hooijdonk 79'	Report	Mohammed Kudus 10'; Edson Álvarez 16'; Steven Bergwijn 19'; Kenneth Taylor 52'	Stadium: Abe Lenstra Stadion; Attendance: 25,500; Referee: Jeroen Manschot

19 March 2023 26	Groningen	0–2	Heerenveen	Groningen
12:15		Report	van Hooijdonk 27', 40'	Stadium: De Grolsch Veste; Attendance: 21,247; Referee: Serdar Gözübüyük

1 April 2023 27	AZ	1–1	Heerenveen	Alkmaar
16:30	Mous 75' (o.g.)	Report	van Hooijdonk 5'	Stadium: AFAS Stadion; Attendance: 18,393; Referee: Jochem Kamphuis

8 April 2023 28	Heerenveen	2–1	Volendam	Heerenveen
21:00	van Hooijdonk 6', 33'	Report	Henk Veerman 18'	Stadium: Abe Lenstra Stadion; Attendance: 22,100; Referee: Martin van den Kerkhof

15 April 2023 29	Sparta Rotterdam	4–0	Heerenveen	Rotterdam
21:00	Mica Pinto 39'; Vito van Crooij 51', 76'; Shurandy Sambo 67'	Report		Stadium: Sparta Stadion Het Kasteel; Attendance: 10,420; Referee: Jaafar Aafouallah

22 April 2023 30	Heerenveen	2–3	Emmen	Heerenveen
18:45	van Hooijdonk 21' (pen.)	Report	Ole Romeny 47', 74', 90+2'	Stadium: Abe Lenstra Stadion; Attendance: 23,020; Referee: Jannick van der Laan

6 May 2023 31	NEC	2–3	Heerenveen	Nijmegen
20:00	Magnus Mattsson 37'; Landry Dimata 61'	Report	Thom Haye 27' van Hooijdonk 82'; Antoine Colassin 87'	Stadium: Goffertstadion; Attendance: 12,500; Referee: Dennis Higler

13 May 2023 32	Heerenveen	0–0	Excelsior	Heerenveen
20:00		Report		Stadium: Abe Lenstra Stadion; Attendance: 18,912; Referee: Rob Dieperink

21 May 2023 33	PSV	3–3	Heerenveen	Eindhoven
14:30	Sangaré 14' de Jong 79'; Simons 86' (pen.)	Report	van Ewijk 33'; Colassin 45+1', 58'	Stadium: Philips Stadion; Attendance: 33,900; Referee: Allard Lindhout

28 May 2023 34	Heerenveen	2–0	Go Ahead Eagles	Heerenveen
14:30	Paweł Bochniewicz 43'; Ché Nunnely 79'	Report		Stadium: Abe Lenstra Stadion; Attendance: 25,100; Referee: Jeroen Manschot

=== KNVB Cup ===
18 October 2022 First round	HSV Hoek	2–4 (a.e.t.)	Heerenveen	Hoek
20:00 CEST (UTC+2)	Schalkwijk 6'; Impens 26' (pen.); Vandecandelaere (yellow card) 71'; Bannani (yellow card) 89'	Report	Köhlert 41'; Al Hajj 49', 93', 119'; Halilović (yellow card) 77' (yellow-red card) 115'	Stadium: Sportpark Denoek; Attendance: 2.500; Referee: Richard Martens

11 January 2023 Second round	Heerenveen	2–0	Volendam	Heerenveen
20:00 CET (UTC+1)	van Amersfoort 41' van Hooijdonk 74'	Report		Stadium: Abe Lenstra Stadion; Attendance: 10,000; Referee: Ingmar Oostrom

7 February 2023 Round of 16	NAC Breda	1–2	Heerenveen	Breda
21:00 CET (UTC+1)	Boere 16'; Velanas (yellow card) 41'; Aimé Omgba (yellow card) 43'; Rowan Besselink (yellow card) 72'	Report	van Aken (yellow card) 27'; Haye (yellow card) 30'; Kaib (yellow card) 43'; van Hooijdonk 45+1', 53'	Stadium: Rat Verlegh Stadion; Referee: Alex Bos

1 March 2023 Quarter-finals	Heerenveen	0–1	Feyenoord	Heerenveen
20:00 CET (UTC+1)		Report	Giménez 80'	Stadium: Abe Lenstra Stadion; Attendance: 12,943; Referee: Pol van Boekel
