= 2021–22 SC Heerenveen season =

Season of a Dutch football club

SC Heerenveen
2021–22 season
- Chairman: Cees Roozemond
- Head coach: Johnny Jansen
- Stadium: Abe Lenstra Stadion
- Eredivisie: 8th
- KNVB Cup: Round of 16
- Top goalscorer: League: Henk Veerman (7); All: Henk Veerman (8)
Home colours	Away colours	Third colours

The 2021–22 season was the 102nd season in the existence of SC Heerenveen and the club's 29th consecutive season in the top flight of Dutch football. In addition to the domestic league, SC Heerenveen participated in this season's edition of the KNVB Cup.

== Players ==
=== First-team squad ===
Note: Flags indicate national team as defined under FIFA eligibility rules; some limited exceptions apply. Players may hold more than one non-FIFA nationality.

No.	Pos.	Nation	Player
1	GK	NED	Erwin Mulder (captain)
2	DF	NED	Syb van Ottele
3	DF	NED	Joost van Aken
4	DF	NED	Sven van Beek
5	DF	NED	Lucas Woudenberg
6	MF	NED	Siem de Jong
7	FW	SRB	Filip Stevanović (on loan from Manchester City)
9	FW	SWE	Amin Sarr
10	MF	CRO	Tibor Halilović (vice-captain)
11	FW	NED	Anthony Musaba (on loan from Monaco)
13	DF	SWE	Rami Kaib
14	DF	KOS	Ibrahim Drešević
15	DF	NED	Nick Bakker
16	FW	NED	Arjen van der Heide
17	MF	SWE	Rami Al Hajj

No.	Pos.	Nation	Player
18	DF	NGR	Hamdi Akujobi
19	MF	NED	Jan Ras
20	FW	NED	Sydney van Hooijdonk (on loan from Bologna)
22	GK	NED	Xavier Mous
23	GK	NED	Jan Bekkema
24	GK	NED	Jaimy Kroesen
25	DF	POL	Paweł Bochniewicz
26	MF	MAR	Anas Tahiri
27	DF	NED	Milan van Ewijk
29	MF	DEN	Nicolas Madsen (on loan from Midtjylland)
30	MF	BUL	Stanislav Shopov
33	MF	NED	Thom Haye
35	MF	NED	Djenahro Nunumete
37	FW	NED	Trustin van 't Loo
—	DF	URU	Joaquín Fernández

=== Out on loan ===
Note: Flags indicate national team as defined under FIFA eligibility rules; some limited exceptions apply. Players may hold more than one non-FIFA nationality.

No.	Pos.	Nation	Player
—	DF	URU	Joaquín Fernández (at Montevideo City Torque until 31 December 2021)

== Pre-season and friendlies ==
Win Draw Loss Fixtures

3 July 2021 Friendly	SC Heerenveen (Netherlands)	3–1	(Netherlands) Jong FC Utrecht	Netherlands
13:00 CEST (UTC+2)

10 July 2021 Friendly	SC Heerenveen (Netherlands)	2–2	(Belgium) Kortrijk	Jubbega, Netherlands
15:30 CEST (UTC+2)	Halilović 50', 60'	Report	Chevalier 4'; Guèye 79'	Stadium: Sportpark 't Heidefjild

13 July 2021 Friendly	SC Heerenveen (Netherlands)	0–2	(Israel) Maccabi Tel Aviv	Putten, Netherlands
18:45 CEST (UTC+2)		Report	Yeini 6'; Turgeman 86'	Stadium: SDC Putten Complex

17 July 2021 Friendly	SC Heerenveen (Netherlands)	3–2	(Netherlands) TOP Oss	Heerenveen, Netherlands
13:30 CEST (UTC+2)	Shopov 4'; Halilović 50'; Kongolo 87'	Report	Noslin 16', 30'	Stadium: Abe Lenstra Stadion

31 July 2021 Friendly	PEC Zwolle (Netherlands)	0–2	(Netherlands) SC Heerenveen	Zwolle, Netherlands
18:45 CEST (UTC+2)		Report	J. Veerman 7'; De Jong 84'	Stadium: MAC³PARK Stadion

7 August 2021 Friendly	SC Heerenveen (Netherlands)	1–1	(Italy) Lecce	Heerenveen, Netherlands
18:30 CEST (UTC+2)				Stadium: Abe Lenstra Stadion
Note: Finished after 47 minutes due to a storm.

24 March 2022 Friendly	SC Heerenveen (Netherlands)	1–0	(Netherlands) PEC Zwolle	Heerenveen, Netherlands
19:30 CET (UTC+1)				Stadium: Abe Lenstra Stadion

== Competitions ==
=== Overall record ===
Competition	First match	Last match	Starting round	Final position	Record							
Competition	First match	Last match	Starting round	Final position	Pld	W	D	L	GF	GA	GD	Win %
Eredivisie	13 August 2021	15 May 2022	Matchday 1	8th	34	11	8	15	37	50	−13	32.35
Eredivisie Play-offs	19 May 2022	22 May 2022	Semi-finals	Semi-finals	2	1	0	1	3	4	−1	50.00
KNVB Cup	27 October 2021	18 January 2022	First round	Round of 16	3	2	0	1	4	2	+2	66.67
Total					39	14	8	17	44	56	−12	35.90

Source: Soccerway

=== Eredivisie ===
==== League table ====
Pos	Team	Pld	W	D	L	GF	GA	GD	Pts	Qualification or relegation
6	Vitesse	34	15	6	13	42	51	−9	51	Qualification for the European competition play-offs
7	Utrecht	34	12	11	11	51	46	+5	47	Qualification for the European competition play-offs
8	Heerenveen	34	11	8	15	37	50	−13	41	Qualification for the European competition play-offs
9	Cambuur	34	11	6	17	53	70	−17	39	
10	RKC Waalwijk	34	9	11	14	40	51	−11	38	

Source: Eredivisie
Rules for classification: Season in progress: 1) Most points won; 2) Less points lost; 3) Goal difference; 4) Goals scored; 5) Alphabetical order; End of season: 1) Points; 2) Goal difference; 3) Goals scored; 4) Head-to-head points; 5) Head-to-head goal difference; 6) Head-to-head away goals scored; 7) Play-off if relevant for deciding champion, relegation or participating in a European league, otherwise by draw. 8) Penalty shoot-out (only after a play-off)

==== Results summary ====
Overall								Home						Away					
Pld	W	D	L	GF	GA	GD	Pts	W	D	L	GF	GA	GD	W	D	L	GF	GA	GD
34	11	8	15	37	50	−13	41	6	3	8	23	26	−3	5	5	7	14	24	−10

Source: Eredivisie

==== Results by round ====
Round	1	2	3	4	5	6	7	8	9	10	11	12	13	14	15	16	17	18	19	20	21	22	23	24	25	26	27	28	29	30	31	32	33	34
Ground	A	H	H	A	H	A	H	A	H	A	H	A	H	H	A	H	A	H	A	H	A	H	A	H	A	A	H	A	H	A	H	A	A	H
Result	W	W	L	D	W	L	L	W	L	L	L	D	W	D	W	D	W	L	L	L	L	L	L	L	D	D	W	D	W	L	D	W	L	W
Position	7	3	6	5	4	7	8	7	9	10	12	12	11	11	9	9	9	10	10	10	11	11	11	13	13	12	11	12	11	11	10	8	9	8

Source: Eredivisie
A = Away; H = Home; W = Win; D = Draw; L = Loss

==== Matches ====
The league fixtures were announced on 11 June 2021.

13 August 2021 1	Go Ahead Eagles	0–1	SC Heerenveen	Deventer
20:00 CEST (UTC+2)		Report	Halilović 6'	Stadium: De Adelaarshorst; Attendance: 6,650; Referee: Kevin Blom

21 August 2021 2	SC Heerenveen	3–2	RKC Waalwijk	Heerenveen
18:45 CEST (UTC+2)	H. Veerman 14' (pen.), 44'; Halilović 31'	Report	Odgaard 68'; van der Venne 89'	Stadium: Abe Lenstra Stadion; Attendance: 13,600; Referee: Marc Nagtegaal

29 August 2021 3	SC Heerenveen	1–3	AZ	Heerenveen
16:45 CEST (UTC+2)	Veerman 11'	Report	Pavlidis 14'; Fonn Witry 50'; De Wit 88'	Stadium: Abe Lenstra Stadion; Attendance: 16,000; Referee: Bas Nijhuis

12 September 2021 4	FC Groningen	1–1	SC Heerenveen	Groningen
14:30 CEST (UTC+2)		Report		Stadium: Euroborg; Attendance: 15,000; Referee: Rob Dieperink

18 September 2021 5	SC Heerenveen	1–0	Fortuna Sittard	Heerenveen
16:30 CEST (UTC+2)		Report		Stadium: Abe Lenstra Stadion; Attendance: 16,400; Referee: Laurens Gerrets

22 September 2021 6	Feyenoord	3–1	SC Heerenveen	Rotterdam
21:00 CEST (UTC+2)	Til 12', 88'; Linssen 60'	Report	J. Veerman 82'	Stadium: De Kuip; Attendance: 32,775; Referee: Martin van den Kerkhof

26 September 2021 7	SC Heerenveen	2–3	Twente	Heerenveen
14:30 CEST (UTC+2)	Drešević (yellow card) 9'; J. Veerman (yellow card) 45+3'; Musaba (yellow card) 50'; Pröpper 74' (o.g.); H. Veerman 81'	Report	Van Wolfswinkel 10' (pen.); Rots 42'; Van Beek 66' (o.g.)	Stadium: Abe Lenstra Stadion; Attendance: 18,500; Referee: Jeroen Manschot

2 October 2021 8	PEC Zwolle	0–1	SC Heerenveen	Zwolle
20:00 CEST (UTC+2)		Report		Stadium: MAC³PARK Stadion; Attendance: 13,655; Referee: Dennis Higler

16 October 2021 9	SC Heerenveen	0–2	Ajax	Heerenveen
18:45 CEST (UTC+2)	Madsen (yellow card) 55'; Kaib (yellow card) 61'; Van Ewijk (yellow card) 90'; Van Beek (yellow card) 90+2'	Report	Haller 24'; Neres 75'	Stadium: Abe Lenstra Stadion; Attendance: 25,133; Referee: Danny Makkelie

23 October 2021 10	FC Utrecht	2–1	SC Heerenveen	Utrecht
18:45 CEST (UTC+2)	Sylla 21'; Van der Maarel (yellow card) 48'; Van de Streek 80'	Report	Janssen 23' (o.g.); Kongolo (yellow card) 34'	Stadium: Stadion Galgenwaard; Attendance: 21,875; Referee: Jochem Kamphuis

30 October 2021 11	SC Heerenveen	1–2	Vitesse	Heerenveen
20:00 CEST (UTC+2)		Report		Stadium: Abe Lenstra Stadion; Attendance: 17,187; Referee: Martin van den Kerkhof

6 November 2021 12	NEC	1–1	SC Heerenveen	Nijmegen
18:45 CET (UTC+1)		Report		Stadium: Goffertstadion; Attendance: 0 Referee: Bas Nijhuis

21 November 2021 13	SC Heerenveen	2–1	Willem II	Heerenveen
14:30 CET (UTC+1)		Report		Stadium: Abe Lenstra Stadion; Attendance: 0 Referee: Serdar Gözübüyük

28 November 2021 14	SC Heerenveen	1–1	PSV	Heerenveen
16:45 CET (UTC+1)	Kaib (yellow card) 62'; Al Hajj 73'	Report	Carlos Vinícius 13'; Gutiérrez (yellow card) 67'	Stadium: Abe Lenstra Stadion; Attendance: 0 Referee: Allard Lindhout

4 December 2021 15	Heracles Almelo	0–1	SC Heerenveen	Almelo
21:00 CET (UTC+1)		Report		Stadium: Erve Asito; Attendance: 0 Referee: Pol van Boekel

11 December 2021 16	SC Heerenveen	0–0	Sparta Rotterdam	Heerenveen
20:00 CET (UTC+1)		Report		Stadium: Abe Lenstra Stadion; Attendance: 0 Referee: Jannick van der Laan

19 December 2021 17	Cambuur	1–2	SC Heerenveen	Leeuwarden
12:15 CET (UTC+1)		Report		Stadium: Cambuur Stadion; Attendance: 0 Referee: Danny Makkelie

22 December 2021 18	SC Heerenveen	0–3	Feyenoord	Heerenveen
18:45 CET (UTC+1)		Report	Til 32'; Senesi 44'; Linssen 58'	Stadium: Abe Lenstra Stadion; Attendance: 0 Referee: Jeroen Manschot

15 January 2022 19	Twente	2–0	SC Heerenveen	Enschede
20:00 CET (UTC+1)	Ugalde 77'; Van Wolfswinkel 88' (pen.)	Report		Stadium: De Grolsch Veste; Attendance: 0 Referee: Pol van Boekel

22 January 2022 20	SC Heerenveen	0–1	PEC Zwolle	Heerenveen
20:00 CET (UTC+1)		Report		Stadium: Abe Lenstra Stadion; Attendance: 0 Referee: Martin van den Kerkhof

5 February 2022 21	Fortuna Sittard	2–0	SC Heerenveen	Sittard
18:45 CET (UTC+1)		Report		Stadium: Fortuna Sittard Stadion; Attendance: 4,200; Referee: Joey Kooij

13 February 2022 22	SC Heerenveen	0–1	NEC	Heerenveen
14:30 CET (UTC+1)		Report		Stadium: Abe Lenstra Stadion; Attendance: 8,321; Referee: Richard Martens

20 February 2022 23	PSV	3–1	SC Heerenveen	Eindhoven
16:45 CET (UTC+1)	Madueke 13'; Götze 46'; Veerman 50'	Report	Halilović 36'	Stadium: Philips Stadion; Attendance: 35,000; Referee: Dennis Higler

27 February 2022 24	SC Heerenveen	1–2	FC Utrecht	Heerenveen
20:00 CET (UTC+1)	Van Hooijdonk 80' (pen.)	Report	Ramselaar 58'; Van der Hoorn 69', (yellow card) 78'; Van de Streek (yellow card) 90+1'	Stadium: Abe Lenstra Stadion; Attendance: 19,200; Referee: Serdar Gözübüyük

5 March 2022 25	Willem II	0–0	SC Heerenveen	Tilburg
16:30 CET (UTC+1)		Report		Stadium: Koning Willem II Stadion; Attendance: 13,082; Referee: Jochem Kamphuis

12 March 2022 26	RKC Waalwijk	0–0	SC Heerenveen	Waalwijk
21:00 CET (UTC+1)		Report		Stadium: Mandemakers Stadion; Attendance: 4,203; Referee: Jeroen Manschot

18 March 2022 27	SC Heerenveen	2–0	Heracles Almelo	Heerenveen
20:00 CET (UTC+1)	Sarr 59'; Bakker 88'	Report		Stadium: Abe Lenstra Stadion; Attendance: 17,980; Referee: Alex Bos

3 April 2022 28	Sparta Rotterdam	1–1	SC Heerenveen	Rotterdam
14:30 CEST (UTC+2)	Van Crooij 52' (pen.)	Report	Sarr 67'	Stadium: Het Kasteel; Attendance: 10,210; Referee: Allard Lindhout

10 April 2022 29	SC Heerenveen	3–1	FC Groningen	Heerenveen
12:15 CEST (UTC+2)	Van Hooijdonk 7', 53'; Van Beek 80'	Report	Kasanwirjo 29'	Stadium: Abe Lenstra Stadion; Attendance: 22,500; Referee: Danny Makkelie

23 April 2022 30	AZ	2–1	SC Heerenveen	Alkmaar
18:45 CEST (UTC+2)	Karlsson 44'; Reijnders 87'	Report	Sarr 7'	Stadium: AFAS Stadion; Attendance: 17,198; Referee: Martin van den Kerkhof

1 May 2022 31	SC Heerenveen	3–3	Cambuur	Heerenveen
12:15 CEST (UTC+2)	Tahiri 2'; Van Hooijdonk 34'; Van Aken 90+6'	Report	Uldriķis 12'; Maulun 65' (pen.); Paulissen 90+4'	Stadium: Abe Lenstra Stadion; Attendance: 25,100; Referee: Bas Nijhuis

8 May 2022 32	Vitesse	1–2	SC Heerenveen	Arnhem
14:30 CEST (UTC+2)	Bero 45+1'	Report	Sarr 75', 83'	Stadium: GelreDome; Attendance: 14,710; Referee: Richard Martens

11 May 2022 33	Ajax	5–0	SC Heerenveen	Amsterdam
20:00 CEST (UTC+2)	Tagliafico 19'; Berghuis 33'; Haller 38' (pen.); Brobbey 85'; Álvarez 90+1'	Report		Stadium: Johan Cruyff Arena; Attendance: 54,335; Referee: Allard Lindhout

15 May 2022 34	SC Heerenveen	3–1	Go Ahead Eagles	Heerenveen
14:30 CEST (UTC+2)	Van Hooijdonk 30', 61'; Musaba 87'	Report	Mulenga 89'	Stadium: Abe Lenstra Stadion; Attendance: 23,200; Referee: Serdar Gözübüyük

==== European competition play-offs ====
19 May 2022 Semi-finals First leg	SC Heerenveen	3–2	AZ	Heerenveen
18:45 CEST (UTC+2)	Van Hooijdonk 58'; Sarr 90'; Halilović 90+5'	Report	Evjen 59'; Pavlidis 65'	Stadium: Abe Lenstra Stadion; Referee: Jeroen Manschot

22 May 2022 Semi-finals Second leg	AZ	2–0 (4–3 agg.)	SC Heerenveen	Alkmaar
14:30 CEST (UTC+2)	De Wit 5'; Aboukhlal 88'	Report		Stadium: AFAS Stadion; Referee: Danny Makkelie

=== KNVB Cup ===
27 October 2021 First round	AFC	1–2	SC Heerenveen	Amsterdam
20:00 CEST (UTC+2)	Maatsen 18'; Wesdorp (yellow card) 84'; Linthorst (yellow card) 90+2'	Report	J. Veerman (yellow card) 37'; H. Veerman 76'; Stevanović 79'	Stadium: Sportpark Goed Genoeg; Referee: Richard Martens

16 December 2021 Second round	SC Heerenveen	2–0	De Treffers	Heerenveen
21:00 CET (UTC+1)	Halilović (yellow card) 25'; De Jong 74'; J. Veerman 88'	Report	Ippel (yellow card) 50'; Van den Berg (yellow card) 77'	Stadium: Abe Lenstra Stadion; Referee: Marc Nagtegaal

18 January 2022 Round of 16	SC Heerenveen	0–1	Go Ahead Eagles	Heerenveen
21:00 CET (UTC+1)		Report	Córdoba 15'	Stadium: Abe Lenstra Stadion; Referee: Edwin van de Graaf
