= Xavier Mous =

Dutch footballer (born 1995)

Personal information
- Date of birth: 4 August 1995 (age 31)
- Place of birth: Haarlem, Netherlands
- Height: 1.88 m (6 ft 2 in)
- Position: Goalkeeper

Youth career
- 2005–2015: Ajax

Senior career*
Years	Team	Apps	(Gls)
2015	Jong Ajax	3	(0)
2015–2016	Ajax	0	(0)
2015–2016	→ FC Oss (loan)	25	(0)
2016–2018	FC Oss	68	(0)
2018–2019	Cambuur	38	(0)
2019–2021	PEC Zwolle	28	(0)
2021–2023	Heerenveen	32	(0)
Total		194	(0)
- * Club domestic league appearances and goals

Xavier Mous (born 4 August 1995) is a Dutch former professional footballer who played as a goalkeeper.

== Career ==
Mous came through the youth system at Ajax. He made his professional debut for Jong Ajax on 16 January 2015 in a 1–1 Eerste Divisie draw with Telstar, playing the full match. In the summer of 2015, he joined FC Oss on loan for the 2015–16 season. After his Ajax contract expired, he signed for FC Oss on a permanent two-year deal on 19 May 2016.

On 24 June 2019, Mous joined PEC Zwolle on a two-year contract with an option for a further season.

On 25 June 2021, Mous signed a two-year contract with Heerenveen. He began the 2021–22 season as understudy to Erwin Mulder and made his debut on 26 September, coming on at half-time in a 3–2 home defeat to Twente. He then enjoyed a spell as first choice, including after Mulder's return from injury, before Mulder regained the starting role following a run of defeats after the winter break under interim manager Ole Tobiasen. Mous spent the 2022–23 season, primarily as back-up, with Andries Noppert arriving as first-choice goalkeeper, and left the club at the end of the campaign upon the expiry of his contract.

In May 2024, aged 28, Mous announced his retirement from professional football to focus on a full-time career as a tax advisor and to spend more time with his family.

== Personal life ==
Alongside his playing career, Mous trained and worked as a tax advisor; after retiring in May 2024 he took up the role full-time.
