= Amin Sarr =

Swedish footballer (born 2001)

Personal information
- Date of birth: 11 March 2001 (age 25)
- Place of birth: Malmö, Sweden
- Height: 1.88 m (6 ft 2 in)
- Position: Forward

Team information
- Current team: Hellas Verona
- Number: 9

Youth career
- –2012: AIF Barrikaden
- 2013–2015: Kulladals
- 2016–2017: Husie
- 2017: Trelleborg
- 2018–2020: Malmö

Senior career*
Years	Team	Apps	(Gls)
2020–2022	Malmö	20	(1)
2021	→ Mjällby (loan)	19	(8)
2022–2023	Heerenveen	32	(10)
2023–2025	Lyon	16	(1)
2023–2024	→ Wolfsburg (loan)	14	(0)
2024–2025	→ Hellas Verona (loan)	32	(4)
2025–	Hellas Verona	34	(0)

International career^{‡}
2019	Sweden U19	2	(0)
2020–2022	Sweden U21	10	(3)
- * Club domestic league appearances and goals as of 25 May 2026 ‡ National team caps and goals as of 11 June 2022

Amin Sarr (born 11 March 2001) is a Swedish professional footballer who plays as a forward for Serie B club Hellas Verona.

== Club career ==
=== Malmö FF ===
Born in Sweden to Gambian parents, Sarr signed his first professional contract with Malmö FF on 23 April 2020 in advance of the Allsvenskan season. He made his professional debut on 16 July, and scored his first goal on 2 August, in his first start, in a 3–0 win over IFK Göteborg. The following week, Sarr signed a contract extension to keep him at the club an additional two years, through 2023. Sarr made 17 appearances for the Allsvenskan champions in his first season, including six starts, scoring one goal. Sarr made just three appearances in the 2021 Allsvenskan with Malmö FF before being loaned out to fellow Allsvenskan side Mjällby AIF to seek increased playing time.

==== Loan to Mjällby AIF ====
Sarr was loaned to Mjällby AIF on 16 June 2021, and made his debut for the club two days later, scoring twice in a 3–2 defeat to IFK Göteborg.

=== Heerenveen ===
On 31 January 2022, Sarr signed a contract with Dutch club Heerenveen until mid-2025. He scored his first goal for the club against Heracles Almelo, scoring the first goal in a 2–0 win.

=== Lyon ===
On 30 January 2023, Lyon announced the signing of Sarr until 2027.

==== Loan to VfL Wolfsburg ====
On 31 August 2023, Sarr joined VfL Wolfsburg in Germany on a season-long loan.

=== Hellas Verona ===
On 27 August 2024, Sarr was loaned to Hellas Verona in Italy, with an option to buy. On 4 July 2025, his transfer to Hellas Verona became a permanent deal worth €5 million, plus €1.5 million in add-ons, and a 15% sell-on clause on a future sale in favor of Lyon.

== International career ==
Sarr was recalled to the Sweden national under-21 football team for the first time during their 2021 UEFA European Under-21 Championship qualifying matches in October 2020. He made his debut in the 10–0 defeat of Armenia, scoring a goal. Sarr is also eligible to represent The Gambia internationally, as his twin brother, goalkeeper Lamin, accepted a call-up with their senior team in the summer of 2021.

== Career statistics ==
As of match played 28 December 2025

Appearances and goals by club, season and competition
Club	Season	League			National cup (Note: Includes Svenska Cupen, KNVB Cup, Coupe de France)		Continental		Other		Total	
Club	Season	Division	Apps	Goals	Apps	Goals	Apps	Goals	Apps	Goals	Apps	Goals
Malmö FF	2020	Allsvenskan	17	1	0	0	3 (Note: Appearances in UEFA Europa League)	0	—		20	1
Malmö FF	2021	Allsvenskan	3	0	3	1	1 (Note: Appearance in UEFA Champions League)	0	—		7	1
Malmö FF	Total		20	1	3	1	4	0	—		27	2
Mjällby (loan)	2021	Allsvenskan	19	8	1	0	—		—		20	8
Heerenveen	2021–22	Eredivisie	13	5	—		—		2 (Note: Appearances in Eredivisie European play offs)	1	15	6
Heerenveen	2022–23	Eredivisie	19	5	1	0	—		—		20	5
Heerenveen	Total		32	10	1	0	—		2	1	35	11
Lyon	2022–23	Ligue 1	13	1	2	0	—		—		15	1
Lyon	2023–24	Ligue 1	3	0	—		—		—		3	0
Lyon	Total		16	1	2	0	—		—		18	1
VfL Wolfsburg (loan)	2023–24	Bundesliga	14	0	—		—		—		14	0
Hellas Verona (loan)	2024–25	Serie A	32	4	—		—		—		32	4
Hellas Verona	2025–26	Serie A	15	0	2	0	—		—		17	0
Hellas Verona	Total		47	4	2	0	—		—		49	4
Career total			148	24	9	1	4	0	2	1	163	26

== Honours ==
Malmö

- Allsvenskan: 2020, 2021
