= Milan van Ewijk =

Dutch footballer (born 2000)

Personal information
- Full name: Milan Fabrizio van Ewijk
- Date of birth: 8 September 2000 (age 26)
- Place of birth: Amsterdam, Netherlands
- Height: 1.77 m (5 ft 10 in)
- Positions: Midfielder; right back

Team information
- Current team: Coventry City
- Number: 27

Youth career
- –2016: Feyenoord
- 2016–2018: Excelsior Maassluis

Senior career*
Years	Team	Apps	(Gls)
2018–2019	Excelsior Maassluis	34	(2)
2019–2021	ADO Den Haag	45	(1)
2020	→ Cambuur (loan)	2	(0)
2021–2023	Heerenveen	67	(7)
2023–	Coventry City	139	(4)

International career
2022–2023	Netherlands U21	8	(0)
- * Club domestic league appearances and goals as of 31 October 2026

Milan Fabrizio van Ewijk (born 8 September 2000) is a Dutch professional professional footballer who plays as a midfielder and right back for Premier League club Coventry City.

== Club career ==
=== Excelsior Maassluis ===
Despite being born in Amsterdam, the capital of the Netherlands, Van Ewijk signed for Excelsior Maassluis from the youth academy of Feyenoord in 2016. He made 36 appearances for the club in total, scoring 2 goals.

=== ADO Den Haag ===
On 29 June 2019, Van Ewijk signed with ADO Den Haag after a successful season with Excelsior Maassluis. He made his professional debut with ADO Den Haag in a 4–2 Eredivisie loss to Utrecht on 4 August 2019.

==== Loan to Cambuur ====
On January 31 2020, Van Ewijk joined Eerste Divisie side Cambuur for the rest of the 2019–20 season.

=== Heerenveen ===
Van Ewijk signed for Heerenveen on 16 May 2021 for a fee reported to be almost €600k. In 2022–23, he was named in the Eredivisie team of the season.

=== Coventry City ===
On 27 July 2023, Van Ewijk signed for English Championship club Coventry City for an undisclosed fee reported to be around £3.4 million. He scored his first goal for the club from a 25-yard free kick to open the scoring against Watford in a 3–3 draw. He scored his second goal for the club in a 3–1 win against Leicester City on 14 January 2024. Van Ewijk started and played every minute of Coventry's FA Cup semi-final as they were eliminated by Manchester United on penalties at Wembley. During the 2024–25 campaign, Milan Van Ewijk scored and got an assist against Oxford United which enabled Coventry City to win 3–2, after a double from Haji Wright.

== International career ==
Van Ewijk played eight games for the Netherlands national under-21 football team.

== Personal life ==
Born in the Netherlands, Van Ewijk is of Surinamese descent, thus being eligible to play for the Netherlands and Suriname.

== Career statistics ==
As of match played 21 November 2026

Appearances and goals by club, season and competition
Club	Season	League			National cup (Note: Includes KNVB Cup, FA Cup)		League cup (Note: Includes EFL Cup)		Other		Total	
Club	Season	Division	Apps	Goals	Apps	Goals	Apps	Goals	Apps	Goals	Apps	Goals
Excelsior Maassluis	2017–18	Tweede Divisie	2	0	0	0	—		—		2	0
Excelsior Maassluis	2018–19	Tweede Divisie	32	2	2	0	—		—		34	2
Excelsior Maassluis	Total		34	2	2	0	—		—		36	2
ADO Den Haag	2019–20	Eredivisie	12	0	0	0	—		—		12	0
ADO Den Haag	2020–21	Eredivisie	33	1	1	0	—		—		34	1
ADO Den Haag	Total		45	1	1	0	—		—		46	1
Cambuur (loan)	2019–20	Eerste Divisie	2	0	0	0	—		—		2	0
Heerenveen	2021–22	Eredivisie	33	1	3	0	—		2 (Note: Appearances in Eredivisie European play-offs)	0	38	1
Heerenveen	2022–23	Eredivisie	34	6	4	0	—		2	0	40	6
Heerenveen	Total		67	7	7	0	—		4	0	78	7
Coventry City	2023–24	Championship	42	2	4	0	1	0	—		47	2
Coventry City	2024–25	Championship	45	2	1	0	3	0	2 (Note: Appearances in Championship play-offs)	0	51	2
Coventry City	2025–26	Championship	44	0	1	0	0	0	—		45	0
Coventry City	2026–27	Premier League	10	0	0	0	0	0	—		10	0
Coventry City	Total		141	4	6	0	4	0	2	0	155	4
Career total			289	14	16	0	4	0	6	0	315	14

== Honours ==
Coventry City

- EFL Championship: 2025–26

Individual

- Eredivisie Team of the Month: August 2022, November 2022
- EFL Championship Team of the Year: 2025–26
- PFA Team of the Year: 2025–26 Championship
