= Sydney van Hooijdonk =

Dutch footballer (born 2000)

Personal information
- Full name: Sydney van Hooijdonk
- Date of birth: 6 February 2000 (age 26)
- Place of birth: Breda, Netherlands
- Height: 1.90 m (6 ft 3 in)
- Position: Forward

Team information
- Current team: PEC Zwolle (on loan from Estrela da Amadora)
- Number: 17

Youth career
- –2017: VV Beek Vooruit
- 2017–2018: NAC

Senior career*
| Years | Team | Apps | (Gls) |
| 2018–2021 | NAC | 68 | (22) |
| 2021–2024 | Bologna | 13 | (0) |
| 2022–2023 | → Heerenveen (loan) | 46 | (22) |
| 2024 | → Norwich City (loan) | 10 | (0) |
| 2024–2025 | Cesena | 13 | (0) |
| 2025–2026 | NAC | 35 | (6) |
| 2026– | Estrela da Amadora | 12 | (1) |
| 2026– | → PEC Zwolle (loan) | 8 | (2) |

International career^{‡}
| 2023 | Netherlands U21 | 2 | (0) |
- * Club domestic league appearances and goals as of 7 November 2026 ‡ National team caps and goals as of 27 March 2023

Sydney van Hooijdonk (born 6 February 2000) is a Dutch professional footballer who plays as a forward for Eredivisie club PEC Zwolle, on loan from Primeira Liga club Estrela da Amadora.

== Club career ==
=== NAC Breda ===
Van Hooijdonk made his league debut for NAC Breda on 5 October 2018 in a 2–1 away defeat against Utrecht in the Eredivisie, being substituted on in the 90th minute, replacing Estonian centre back and defensive midfielder Karol Mets. NAC Breda's 2018-19 campaign ended in relegation from the top-flight, securing only five wins and eight draws, and finishing on twenty-three points, with Van Hooijdonk making a total of twelve league appearances from the bench, but failing to score or assist.

In the 2019–20 Keuken Kampioen Divisie season Van Hooijdonk started off the bench again, but he very quickly began playing full matches on a semi-regular basis, making twenty-five appearances, with six goals and two assists. A bulk of his goals and assists came during the 1st Period, and he was acclaimed with being a driving force towards NAC Breda winning it. However, the club couldn't take advantage of the playoff spot they'd been allocated, as the season was abandoned by the KNVB on 24 April 2020, following a suspension that the Dutch Government issued on 12 March 2020 due to the global COVID-19 pandemic.

In the 2020–21 Keuken Kampioen Divisie season Van Hooijdonk became a key player for NAC Breda despite suffering several minor injuries, securing sixteen goals and two assists in thirty-one appearances (including those in the 2020-21 Eredivisie / Keuken Kampioen Divisie Promotion / Relegation play-offs, where his club were defeated in the Final in a 2–1 home defeat to NEC). Van Hooijdonk's contract was set to expire at the end of the 2020–21 season, and he was attracting End of Contract interest from clubs including Celtic and Nottingham Forest, likely due to these being clubs his father played at. However, perhaps due to new work permit rules issued by the Home Office in the United Kingdom following Brexit (which is points-based and calculated by several factors, such as youth / senior international appearances, club ranking / league standing and club appearances), these deals failed to materialize and he left NAC Breda at the end of the season, becoming a free agent.

=== Bologna ===
On 3 July 2021, he joined Serie A club Bologna on a free transfer, contracted until the end of the 2024–25 season, and making his debut on 16 August 2021 in a 5-4 Coppa Italia First Round defeat against Ternana Calcio, being substituted on in the 85th minute, replacing Austrian forward Marko Arnautović. In the 2021–22 Serie A season Van Hooijdonk played only four games for his club, each from the bench, without goals or assists.

==== Heerenveen (loan) ====
On 25 January 2022, he joined Eredivisie club Heerenveen on loan until the end of the 2021–22 season, making his debut on 13 February 2022 in a 1–0 defeat against NEC Nijmegen. Despite initial reservations about returning to the Netherlands, in the 2021–22 Eredivisie season Van Hooijdonk scored six goals in thirteen appearances, piquing the interest of Heerenveen's Technical Director, Ferry de Haan, who approached Bologna to enquire about his availability.

On 21 June 2022, it was reported that Bologna were considering adding players (including Van Hooijdonk) to a potential deal for Groningen's Norwegian forward, Jørgen Strand Larsen. He was quick to distance himself from the rumoured deal, likely due to the club being rivals with Heerenveen. On 30 June 2022, his loan contract with Heerenveen expired, and he returned to Bologna. On 25 July 2022, Van Hooijdonk returned to Heerenveen on loan until the end of the 2022-23 Eredivisie season. The 2022–23 Eredivisie season was another respectable showing for Van Hooijdonk; he netted sixteen goals and one assist in thirty-five appearances.

==== Return to Bologna ====
On 30 June 2023, his loan contract with Heerenveen expired, and then-Bologna manager Thiago Motta decided to give him a chance in the First Team. As such, Van Hooijdonk made a total of nine appearances during the 2023–24 Serie A season, struggling to start matches (only two of those appearances were from starting a match, often finding himself losing out to Joshua Zirkzee) and contributing no goals or assists.

==== Norwich City (loan) ====
On 1 February 2024 Van Hooijdonk joined Norwich City on loan for the remainder of the 2023–24 season, making his debut as a late substitute on 3 February 2024 in a 2–1 win against Coventry City. During his spell at Norwich, Van Hooijdonk made 12 appearances, all as a substitute, without scoring.

=== Cesena ===
On 9 August 2024, van Hooijdonk joined Cesena.

=== Return to NAC Breda ===
On 9 January 2025, van Hooijdonk returned to NAC on a one-and-a-half-year contract.

=== Estrela da Amadora ===
On 29 January 2026, van Hooijdonk moved to Portugal, joining Primeira Liga club Estrela da Amadora on a contract until 2028.

== International career ==
=== Youth ===
Van Hooijdonk was called up for the Netherlands national under-21s by then-manager Erwin van de Looi to play friendlies against the Norway national under-21s and Czech Republic national under-21s in March 2023, making his youth debut for the Netherlands on 25 March 2023, in a 3–0 win against the Norway national under-21s.

== Style of play ==
=== Analysis ===
Generally regarded as a poacher and a target man, Van Hooijdonk touches the ball mostly in the attacking third (especially within the penalty box), and generally looks to time runs exploiting pockets of space.

== Personal life ==
Van Hooijdonk is the son of former Dutch international footballer Pierre van Hooijdonk, who also played for NAC Breda. He is of Moroccan descent through his biological paternal grandfather.

== Career statistics ==
=== Club ===
As of match played 14 March 2025

Appearances and goals by club, season and competition
| Club | Season | League | | | National cup (Note: Includes KNVB Cup, Coppa Italia) | | Total | |
| Club | Season | Division | Apps | Goals | Apps | Goals | Apps | Goals |
|---|---|---|---|---|---|---|---|---|
| NAC Breda | 2018–19 | Eredivisie | 12 | 0 | 0 | 0 | 12 | 0 |
| NAC Breda | 2019–20 | Eerste Divisie | 25 | 6 | 2 | 1 | 27 | 7 |
| NAC Breda | 2020–21 | Eerste Divisie | 31 | 16 | 0 | 0 | 31 | 16 |
| NAC Breda | Total | | 68 | 22 | 2 | 1 | 70 | 23 |
| Bologna | 2021–22 | Serie A | 4 | 0 | 1 | 0 | 5 | 0 |
| Bologna | 2023–24 | Serie A | 9 | 0 | 2 | 1 | 11 | 1 |
| Bologna | Total | | 13 | 0 | 3 | 1 | 16 | 1 |
| Heerenveen (loan) | 2021–22 | Eredivisie | 13 | 6 | 0 | 0 | 13 | 6 |
| Heerenveen (loan) | 2022–23 | Eredivisie | 35 | 16 | 4 | 3 | 39 | 19 |
| Heerenveen (loan) | Total | | 48 | 22 | 4 | 3 | 52 | 25 |
| Norwich City (loan) | 2023–24 | Championship | 12 | 0 | 0 | 0 | 12 | 0 |
| Cesena | 2024–25 | Serie B | 13 | 0 | 2 | 0 | 15 | 0 |
| NAC Breda | 2024–25 | Eredivisie | 9 | 1 | 0 | 0 | 9 | 1 |
| Career total | | | 163 | 45 | 11 | 5 | 174 | 50 |

=== International ===
As of match played 27 March 2023

Appearances and goals by national team and year
| National team | Year | Apps | Goals |
|---|---|---|---|
| Netherlands U21 | 2023 | 2 | 0 |
| Total | | 2 | 0 |

== Honours ==
Individual

- Eredivisie Talent of the Month: April 2022,
- Eredivisie Team of the Month: April 2022, August 2022,
