= Djenahro Nunumete =

Dutch footballer (born 2002)

Personal information
- Date of birth: 28 January 2002 (age 24)
- Place of birth: Groningen, Netherlands
- Height: 1.79 m (5 ft 10 in)
- Position: Midfielder

Youth career
- BSVV Bovensmilde
- –2010: ACV Assen
- 2010–2013: Ajax
- 2013–2020: Heerenveen

Senior career*
Years	Team	Apps	(Gls)
2021–2024	Heerenveen	5	(0)
2024–2026	Emmen	51	(1)
- * Club domestic league appearances and goals as of 28 April 2026

Djenahro Nunumete (born 28 January 2002) is a Dutch professional footballer who plays as a midfielder.

== Career ==
On 23 June 2024, Nunumete signed a contract with Emmen for two seasons, with an option for third.

== Personal life ==
Nunumete is of Indonesian descent, via his father with roots in Molucca.

== Career statistics ==
As of match played 21 December 2025

Appearances and goals by club, season and competition
Club	Season	League			KNVB Cup		Other		Total	
Club	Season	Division	Apps	Goals	Apps	Goals	Apps	Goals	Apps	Goals
Heerenveen	2021-22	Eredivisie	2	0	0	0	0	0	2	0
Heerenveen	2022-23	Eredivisie	0	0	1	0	0	0	1	0
Heerenveen	2023-24	Eredivisie	3	0	1	0	—		4	0
Heerenveen	Total		5	0	2	0	0	0	7	0
Emmen	2024-25	Eerste Divisie	25	1	0	0	—		25	1
Emmen	2025-26	Eerste Divisie	13	0	0	0	—		13	0
Career total			43	1	2	0	0	0	45	1
