= Trustin van 't Loo =

Dutch footballer

Personal information
- Date of birth: 25 May 2004 (age 22)
- Place of birth: Lelystad, Netherlands
- Position: Winger

Team information
- Current team: SC Heerenveen (U21)

Youth career
- –2013: VV Unicum
- 2013–: Heerenveen

Senior career*
Years	Team	Apps	(Gls)
2022–	Heerenveen	1	(0)
- * Club domestic league appearances and goals as of 1 September 2023

Trustin van 't Loo (born 25 May 2004) is a Dutch professional footballer who plays as a winger for the Under-21 squad of SC Heerenveen.

== Club career ==
Trustin van 't Loo joined SC Heerenveen at the age of nine, from Unicum, an amateur club in Lelystad. He signed his first professional contract with the club in June 2021.

Van 't Loo made his professional debut for Heerenveen on the 5 February 2022, replacing Anthony Musaba during a 2–0 away Eredivisie loss to Fortuna Sittard.
