= Rami Al Hajj =

Footballer (born 2001)

Personal information
- Date of birth: 17 September 2001 (age 25)
- Place of birth: Beirut, Lebanon
- Height: 1.80 m (5 ft 11 in)
- Position: Attacking midfielder

Team information
- Current team: Silkeborg
- Number: 22

Youth career
- 2008–2018: Falkenbergs FF
- 2018–2020: Heerenveen

Senior career*
Years	Team	Apps	(Gls)
2020–2023	Heerenveen	67	(1)
2023–2024	OB	29	(3)
2024–2025	Plymouth Argyle	28	(3)
2025–	Silkeborg	34	(1)

International career
2019	Sweden U19	4	(1)
2021–2022	Sweden U21	8	(1)
- * Club domestic league appearances and goals as of 16:12, 15 November 2026 (UTC)

Rami Al Hajj (Arabic: رامي الحاج; born 17 September 2001, previously Rami Hajal) is a professional footballer who plays as an attacking midfielder for Danish Superliga club Silkeborg. Born in Lebanon, Al Hajj represented Sweden internationally at youth level.

== Early life ==
Al Hajj was born in Beirut, Lebanon, and moved with his family to Sweden in 2003 at the age of two. Upon settling in Sweden, the family's surname was changed to "Hajal". On 15 September 2021, he legally reverted his surname to Al Hajj.

== Club career ==
=== Early career ===
Al Hajj developed as a youth player with Falkenbergs FF before joining Dutch club Heerenveen in 2018. He made his professional debut for Heerenveen on 18 January 2020, in a 3–1 Eredivisie defeat to Feyenoord.

=== OB ===
On 14 June 2023, Al Hajj signed with OB of the Danish Superliga ahead of the 2023–24 season. He scored on his debut on 23 July, the opening matchday of the season, converting a penalty in a 2–2 home draw against Randers. Over the course of the season, he made 32 appearances for the club.

=== Plymouth Argyle ===
On 30 August 2024, Al Hajj transferred to EFL Championship side Plymouth Argyle on transfer deadline day. During the 2024–25 season, he recorded three goals in 29 appearances.

=== Silkeborg ===
On 11 July 2025, Al Hajj returned to the Danish Superliga, signing a contract with Silkeborg through the summer of 2029. He made his first appearance for the club on 20 July in the opening match of the 2025–26 Danish Superliga against Brøndby. On 17 September, he scored his first goal for Silkeborg in a 5–0 away victory against Kolding Boldklub in the Danish Cup third round.

== International career ==
Born in Lebanon, Al Hajj represented Sweden at youth level, appearing for both the under-19 and under-21 national teams. He received his first call-up to the senior national team for a friendly against Estonia on 12 January 2024.

== Career statistics ==
As of match played 6 November 2026

Appearances and goals by club, season and competition
Club	Season	League			National cup (Note: Includes KNVB Cup, Danish Cup, FA Cup)		League cup		Europe		Total	
Club	Season	Division	Apps	Goals	Apps	Goals	Apps	Goals	Apps	Goals	Apps	Goals
Heerenveen	2019–20	Eredivisie	5	0	2	0	—		—		7	0
Heerenveen	2020–21	Eredivisie	23	0	3	0	—		—		26	0
Heerenveen	2021–22	Eredivisie	21	1	1	0	—		—		22	1
Heerenveen	2022–23	Eredivisie	18	0	4	3	—		—		22	3
Heerenveen	Total		67	1	10	3	—		—		77	4
OB	2023–24	Danish Superliga	29	3	3	1	—		—		32	4
Plymouth Argyle	2024–25	Championship	28	3	1	0	0	0	—		29	3
Silkeborg	2025–26	Danish Superliga	22	0	3	1	—		4 (Note: Appearances in UEFA Conference League)	0	29	1
Silkeborg	2026–27	Danish Superliga	12	1	0	0	—		—		12	1
Silkeborg	Total		34	1	3	1	—		—		41	4
Career total			158	8	17	5	0	0	4	0	179	13

== Honours ==
Individual

- Superliga Team of the Month: August 2023
