= Rami Kaib =

Footballer (born 1997)

Personal information
- Date of birth: 8 May 1997 (age 29)
- Place of birth: Nyköping, Sweden
- Height: 1.78 m (5 ft 10 in)
- Position: Left-back

Team information
- Current team: Halmstads BK
- Number: 24

Senior career*
Years	Team	Apps	(Gls)
2016–2020	IF Elfsborg	57	(1)
2021–2023	SC Heerenveen	49	(0)
2023	Djurgårdens IF	5	(0)
2024–2025	IF Elfsborg	24	(2)
2025	→ Halmstads BK (loan)	13	(0)
2026–	Halmstads BK	10	(0)

International career^{‡}
2016	Sweden U19	2	(0)
2017	Sweden U20	2	(0)
2022–	Tunisia	2	(0)
- * Club domestic league appearances and goals as of 9 July 2026 ‡ National team caps and goals as of 14 June 2022

Rami Kaib (Arabic: رامي كعيب; born 8 May 1997) is a professional footballer who plays as a left-back for Allsvenskan club Halmstads BK. Born in Sweden, he plays for the Tunisia national team.

== Early life ==
Kaib was born on 8 May 1997 in Sweden to a Tunisian father and a Lebanese mother.

== Club career ==
On 13 January 2021, Kaib joined Eredivisie side Heerenveen on a four-and-a-half-year deal.

On 15 July 2025, Kaib joined Halmstads BK on a loan-deal, from IF Elfsborg.

== International career ==
Kaib represented Sweden at the under-19 level and, despite being eligible to also represent Tunisia and Lebanon, stated in 2021 that he had "ambitions to play for the Sweden national team", and no intention of representing Lebanon.

In May 2022, the Tunisian Football Federation announced that Kaib had signed the necessary documents in order to play for the Tunisia national team.

== Honours ==
Tunisia

- Kirin Cup Soccer: 2022
