= Andries Noppert =

Dutch footballer (born 1994)

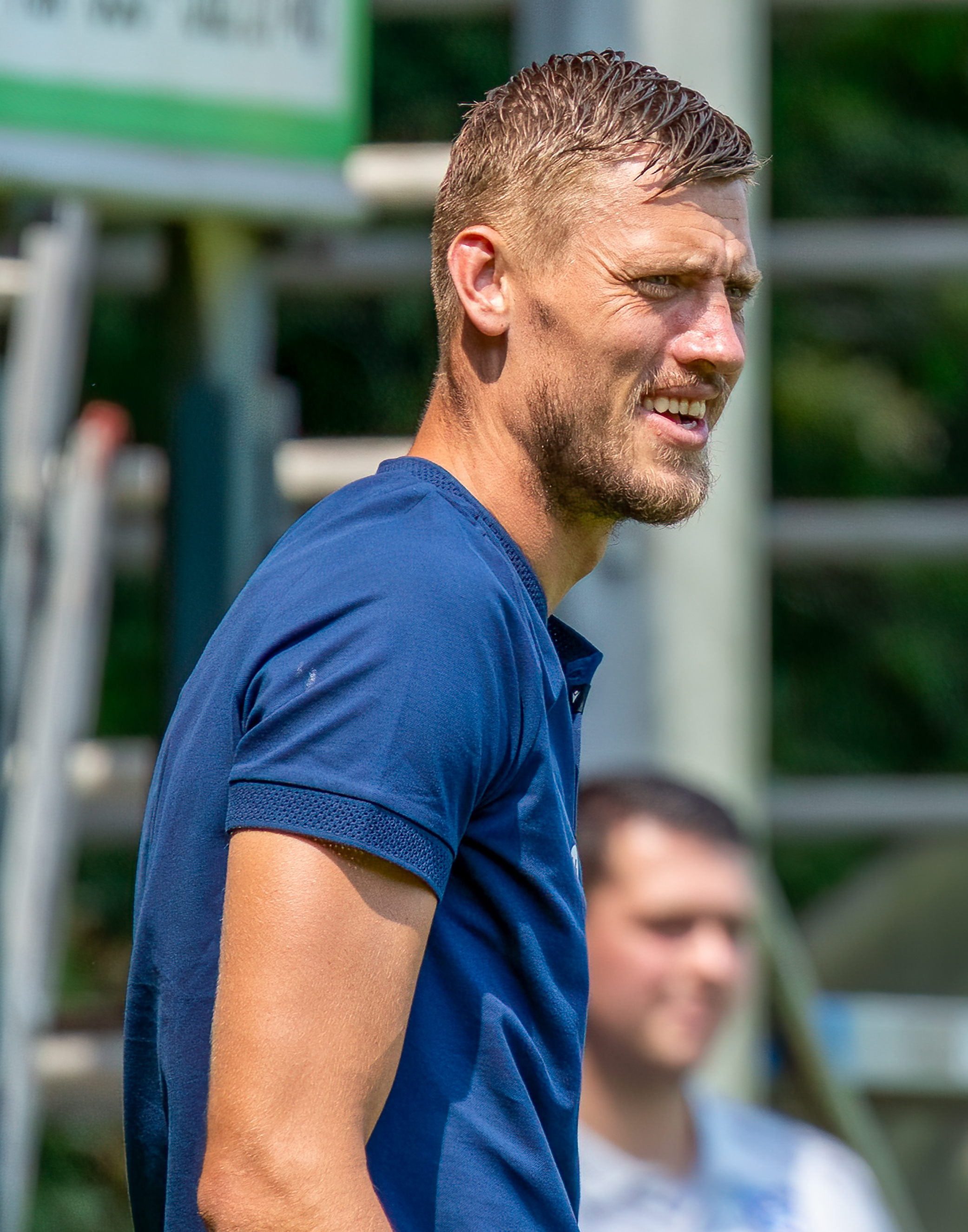
- Noppert with Heerenveen in 2023

Personal information
- Full name: Andries Noppert
- Date of birth: 7 April 1994 (age 32)
- Place of birth: Heerenveen, Netherlands
- Height: 2.03 m (6 ft 8 in)
- Position: Goalkeeper

Team information
- Current team: Heerenveen
- Number: 44

Youth career
- –2013: Heerenveen

Senior career*
Years	Team	Apps	(Gls)
2013–2014	Heerenveen	0	(0)
2014–2018	NAC Breda	6	(0)
2018–2019	Foggia	8	(0)
2019–2020	Dordrecht	2	(0)
2021–2022	Go Ahead Eagles	15	(0)
2022–	Heerenveen	60	(0)

International career^{‡}
2022	Netherlands	5	(0)
- * Club domestic league appearances and goals as of 16:36, 23 January 2026 (UTC) ‡ National team caps and goals as of 09:32, 10 December 2022 (UTC)

Andries Noppert (born 7 April 1994) is a Dutch professional footballer who plays as a goalkeeper for Eredivisie club Heerenveen.

== Club career ==
=== NAC Breda ===
Trained through the youth ranks of Heerenveen, Noppert made his professional debut in 2014 for NAC Breda.

=== Foggia ===
In January 2018, he was signed by Italian club Foggia. After traveling by car from the Netherlands to Italy, his car was stolen by the Foggian Mafia. He made his debut for the club on 28 April, in a 3–1 loss to Cittadella. Three months later, the goalkeeper saved a penalty in a 2–0 win over Carpi. Over the course of a season and a half, he played 8 matches in Serie B. During his stay in Italy, Noppert received the nickname Il Grattacielo ("The Skyscraper" in Italian) from the country's media due to his height.

=== Dordrecht ===
On 12 September 2019, Noppert signed for Dordrecht. After leaving the club, he considered joining the police.

=== Go Ahead Eagles ===
In January 2021, Noppert signed for Go Ahead Eagles until the end of the season.

=== Heerenveen ===
Noppert returned to Heerenveen on 16 May 2022, signing a two-year deal. It was his first season as a first-choice goalkeeper. Noppert quickly impressed, which resulted in Louis van Gaal calling him up to the Netherlands squad for the 2022 FIFA World Cup on 11 November 2022, where he was also selected to be the first-choice goalkeeper. Upon return, Noppert played three matches for Heerenveen before being injured during a warm-up on 25 January 2023. What first looked to be a minor injury kept him out of play for four months, and having undergone surgery, Noppert returned to the pitch in Heerenveen's last match of the regular season against Go Ahead Eagles. Noppert kept a clean sheet in a 2–0 win, sending Heerenveen into European play-offs.

== International career ==
Noppert was called up to the Netherlands national team in September 2022. In November 2022, he was included in the nation's 26-man squad for the 2022 FIFA World Cup in Qatar. He discovered his inclusion in the squad on TV.

Noppert made his international debut in his country's opening match at the tournament against Senegal, a 2–0 victory.

== Career statistics ==
=== Club ===
As of match played 31 August 2025

Appearances and goals by club, season and competition
Club	Season	League			National cup (Note: Includes KNVB Cup, Coppa Italia)		Other		Total	
Club	Season	Division	Apps	Goals	Apps	Goals	Apps	Goals	Apps	Goals
NAC	2014–15	Eredivisie	0	0	0	0	0	0	0	0
NAC	2015–16	Eerste Divisie	1	0	0	0	0	0	1	0
NAC	2016–17	Eerste Divisie	2	0	1	0	0	0	3	0
NAC	2017–18	Eredivisie	3	0	0	0	—		3	0
NAC	Total		6	0	1	0	0	0	7	0
Foggia	2017–18	Serie B	5	0	—		—		5	0
Foggia	2018–19	Serie B	3	0	0	0	—		3	0
Foggia	Total		8	0	0	0	0	0	8	0
FC Dordrecht	2019–20	Eerste Divisie	2	0	0	0	—		2	0
Go Ahead Eagles	2020–21	Eerste Divisie	0	0	0	0	—		0	0
Go Ahead Eagles	2021–22	Eredivisie	15	0	5	0	—		20	0
Go Ahead Eagles	Total		15	0	5	0	0	0	20	0
Heerenveen	2022–23	Eredivisie	18	0	0	0	2 (Note: Appearances in Eredivisie European play-offs)	0	20	0
Heerenveen	2023–24	Eredivisie	22	0	0	0	—		22	0
Heerenveen	2024–25	Eredivisie	16	0	2	0	—		18	0
Heerenveen	2025–26	Eredivisie	4	0	0	0	0	0	4	0
Heerenveen	Total		60	0	2	0	2	0	64	0
Career total			91	0	8	0	2	0	101	0

=== International ===
As of match played 9 December 2022

Appearances and goals by national team and year
National team	Year	Apps	Goals
Netherlands	2022	5	0
Total		5	0
