= 2022–23 Eredivisie =

67th season of the Eredivisie

Eredivisie
- Season: 2022–23
- Dates: 5 August 2022 – 28 May 2023
- Champions: Feyenoord (16th title)
- Relegated: Emmen; Cambuur; Groningen
- Champions League: Feyenoord; PSV Eindhoven
- Europa League: Ajax
- Europa Conference League: AZ; Twente
- Matches: 306
- Goals: 935 (3.06 per match)
- Top goalscorer: Anastasios Douvikas; Xavi Simons (19 goals each)
- Biggest home win: PSV Eindhoven 7–1 Volendam (31 August 2022); Ajax 7–1 Excelsior (16 October 2022); PSV Eindhoven 6–0 Groningen (11 February 2023); Vitesse 6–0 Groningen (21 May 2023)
- Biggest away win: Excelsior 1–6 PSV Eindhoven (28 August 2022); Cambuur 0–5 Ajax (5 February 2023); RKC Waalwijk 0–5 Twente (21 May 2023); Groningen 0–5 Sparta Rotterdam (28 May 2023)
- Highest scoring: AZ 5–5 Utrecht (28 January 2023)
- Longest winning run: 13 matches Feyenoord
- Longest unbeaten run: 26 matches Feyenoord
- Longest winless run: 11 matches Groningen; Volendam
- Longest losing run: 9 matches Cambuur
- Total attendance: 5,121,730
- Average attendance: 16,738

The 2022–23 Eredivisie was the 67th season of the Eredivisie, the premier football competition in the Netherlands. It began on 5 August 2022 and concluded on 28 May 2023. As the 2022 FIFA World Cup started on 20 November, the last round before stoppage was held on 12–13 November. The league resumed games on 6 January.

Feyenoord became the champions in round 32, beating Go Ahead Eagles 3–0 at De Kuip in Rotterdam on 14 May 2023.

== Teams ==
Emmen (promoted after a one-year absence), Volendam (promoted after a thirteen-year absence) and Excelsior (promoted after a three-year absence) were promoted from the 2021–22 Eerste Divisie. Willem II (relegated after eight years in the top flight), PEC Zwolle (relegated after ten years in the top flight), and Heracles Almelo (relegated after seventeen years in the top flight) were relegated to the 2022–23 Eerste Divisie.

Locations of the 2022–23 Eredivisie teams
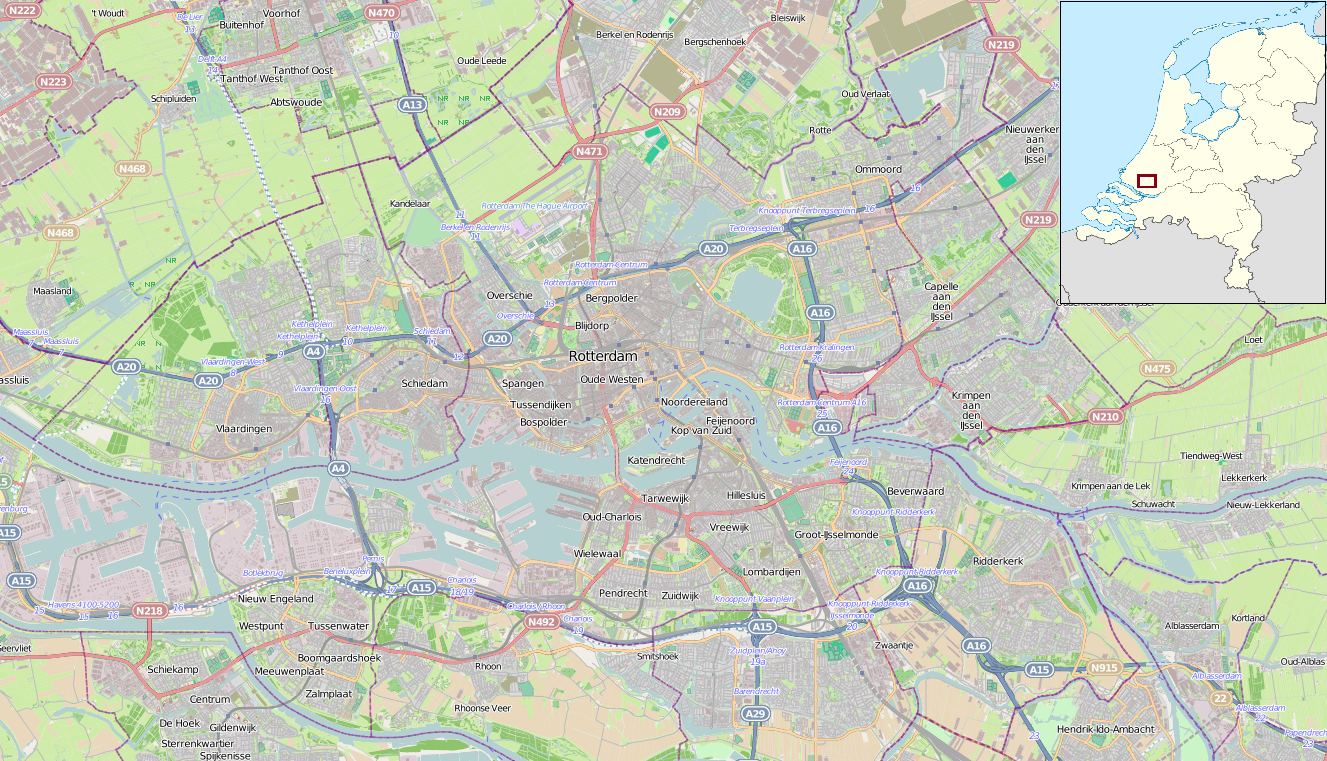
Rotterdam Eredivisie football clubs

=== Stadiums and locations ===
Club	Location	Venue	Capacity	2021–22 position
Ajax	Amsterdam	Johan Cruijff ArenA	55,865	1st
AZ	Alkmaar	AFAS Stadion	19,478	5th
Cambuur	Leeuwarden	Cambuur Stadion	10,500	9th
Emmen	Emmen	De Oude Meerdijk	8,600	1D, 1st
Excelsior	Rotterdam	Van Donge & De Roo Stadion	4,500	1D, 6th (Play-off winner)
Feyenoord	Rotterdam	De Kuip	47,500	3rd
Fortuna Sittard	Sittard	Fortuna Sittard Stadion	10,300	15th
Go Ahead Eagles	Deventer	De Adelaarshorst	10,000	13th
Groningen	Groningen	Euroborg	22,550	12th
Heerenveen	Heerenveen	Abe Lenstra Stadion	27,224	8th
NEC	Nijmegen	Goffertstadion	12,500	11th
PSV Eindhoven	Eindhoven	Philips Stadion	36,500	2nd
RKC Waalwijk	Waalwijk	Mandemakers Stadion	7,500	10th
Sparta Rotterdam	Rotterdam	Spartastadion Het Kasteel	11,000	14th
Twente	Enschede	De Grolsch Veste	30,205	4th
Utrecht	Utrecht	Stadion Galgenwaard	23,750	7th
Vitesse	Arnhem	GelreDome	21,248	6th
Volendam	Volendam	Kras Stadion	7,384	1D, 2nd

=== Number of teams by province ===
Number of teams	Province	Team(s)
3	North Holland	Ajax, AZ, Volendam
3	South Holland	Excelsior, Feyenoord, Sparta Rotterdam
2	Friesland	Cambuur, Heerenveen
2	Gelderland	NEC, Vitesse
2	North Brabant	PSV Eindhoven, RKC Waalwijk
2	Overijssel	Go Ahead Eagles, Twente
1	Drenthe	Emmen
1	Groningen	Groningen
1	Limburg	Fortuna Sittard
1	Utrecht	Utrecht

=== Personnel and kits ===
Note: Flags indicate national team as has been defined under FIFA eligibility rules. Players and managers may hold more than one non-FIFA nationality.

Team	President	Manager	Captain	Kit manufacturer	Main shirt sponsor (chest)
Ajax	(Netherlands) Edwin van der Sar	(Netherlands) John Heitinga (a.i.)	(Serbia) Dušan Tadić	Adidas	Ziggo
AZ	(Netherlands) René Neelissen	(Netherlands) Pascal Jansen	(Netherlands) Jordy Clasie	Nike	Kansino
Cambuur	(Netherlands) Ype Smid	(Netherlands) Sjors Ultee	(Sierra Leone) Alex Bangura	Craft	Bouwgroep Dijkstra Draisma
Emmen	(Netherlands) Ronald Lubbers	(Netherlands) Dick Lukkien	(Netherlands) Jeroen Veldmate	Hummel	EasyToys
Excelsior	(Netherlands) Bob de Lange	(Netherlands) Marinus Dijkhuizen	(Netherlands) Stijn van Gassel	Quick	DSW Zorgverzekeraar
Feyenoord	(Netherlands) Toon van Bodegom	(Netherlands) Arne Slot	(Turkey) Orkun Kökçü	Adidas	EuroParcs
Fortuna Sittard	(Turkey) Özgür Işıtan Gün	(Spain) Julio Velázquez	(Turkey) Burak Yılmaz	Masita	Hurkmans Groep
Go Ahead Eagles	(Netherlands) Jan Willem van Dop	(Netherlands) René Hake	(Netherlands) Mats Deijl	Stanno	Jumper De diersuper
Groningen	(Netherlands) Erik Mulder	(Netherlands) Dennis van der Ree	(Netherlands) Michael Verrips	Robey	Office Centre
Heerenveen	(Netherlands) Cees Roozemond	(Netherlands) Kees van Wonderen	(Netherlands) Sven van Beek	Macron	Ausnutria
NEC	(Netherlands) Ron van Oijen	(Netherlands) Rogier Meijer	(Denmark) Lasse Schöne	Legea	KlokGroep
PSV Eindhoven	(Netherlands) Robert van der Wallen	(Netherlands) Fred Rutten (a.i.)	(Netherlands) Luuk de Jong	Puma	Metropoolregio Brainport Eindhoven
RKC Waalwijk	(Netherlands) Peter Konijnenburg	(Netherlands) Joseph Oosting	(Netherlands) Michiel Kramer	Stanno	Willy Naessens
Sparta Rotterdam	(Netherlands) Leo Ruijs	(Netherlands) Maurice Steijn	(Morocco) Adil Auassar	Robey	De Goudse Verzekeringen
Twente	(Netherlands) Paul van der Kraan	(Netherlands) Ron Jans	(Netherlands) Wout Brama	Meyba	Pure Energie
Utrecht	(Netherlands) Pieter Leyssius	(Denmark) Michael Silberbauer	(Netherlands) Nick Viergever	Nike	T-Mobile
Vitesse	(Netherlands) Henk Parren	(Netherlands) Phillip Cocu	(Slovakia) Matúš Bero	Nike	eToro
Volendam	(Netherlands) Jan Smit	(Netherlands) Wim Jonk	(Netherlands) Carel Eiting	Robey	Bet City

=== Managerial changes ===
Team	Outgoing manager	Manner of departure	Date of vacancy	Position in table	Replaced by	Date of appointment
Ajax	(Netherlands) Erik ten Hag	Signed by Manchester United	15 May 2022	Pre-season	(Netherlands) Alfred Schreuder	1 July 2022
Go Ahead Eagles	(Netherlands) Kees van Wonderen	Signed by Heerenveen	30 June 2022	Pre-season	(Netherlands) René Hake	1 July 2022
Groningen	(Netherlands) Danny Buijs	End of contract	30 June 2022	Pre-season	(Germany) Frank Wormuth	1 July 2022
Heerenveen	(Denmark) Ole Tobiasen	End of interim spell	30 June 2022	Pre-season	(Netherlands) Kees van Wonderen	1 July 2022
PSV Eindhoven	(Germany) Roger Schmidt	End of contract	30 June 2022	Pre-season	(Netherlands) Ruud van Nistelrooy	1 July 2022
Utrecht	(Netherlands) Rick Kruys	End of interim spell	30 June 2022	Pre-season	(Netherlands) Henk Fraser	1 July 2022
Fortuna Sittard	(Netherlands) Sjors Ultee	Sacked	22 August 2022	17th	(Netherlands) Dominik Vergoossen (a.i.)	22 August 2022
Fortuna Sittard	(Netherlands) Dominik Vergoossen (a.i.)	End of interim spell	9 September 2022	18th	(Spain) Julio Velázquez	9 September 2022
Vitesse	(Germany) Thomas Letsch	Signed by VfL Bochum	19 September 2022	14th	(Netherlands) Phillip Cocu	26 September 2022
Cambuur	(Netherlands) Henk de Jong	Resigned for health reasons	20 October 2022	14th	(Netherlands) Pascal Bosschaart & (Netherlands) Martijn Barto (a.i.)	20 October 2022
Cambuur	(Netherlands) Pascal Bosschaart & (Netherlands) Martijn Barto (a.i.)	End of interim spell	13 November 2022	17th	(Netherlands) Sjors Ultee	14 November 2022
Groningen	(Germany) Frank Wormuth	Sacked	14 November 2022	15th	(Netherlands) Dennis van der Ree	2 December 2022
Utrecht	(Netherlands) Henk Fraser	Resigned	14 December 2022	7th	(Serbia) Aleksandar Ranković (a.i.)	14 December 2022
Utrecht	(Serbia) Aleksandar Ranković (a.i.)	End of interim spell	28 December 2022	7th	(Denmark) Michael Silberbauer	28 December 2022
Ajax	(Netherlands) Alfred Schreuder	Sacked	26 January 2023	5th	(Netherlands) John Heitinga (a.i.)	27 January 2023
PSV Eindhoven	(Netherlands) Ruud van Nistelrooy	Resigned	24 May 2023	2nd	(Netherlands) Fred Rutten (a.i.)	24 May 2023

== Standings ==
=== League table ===
Pos	Team	Pld	W	D	L	GF	GA	GD	Pts	Qualification or relegation
1	Feyenoord (C)	34	25	7	2	81	30	+51	82	Qualification to Champions league group stage
2	PSV Eindhoven	34	23	6	5	89	40	+49	75	Qualification to Champions League third qualifying round
3	Ajax	34	20	9	5	86	38	+48	69	Qualification to Europa League play-off round
4	AZ	34	20	7	7	68	35	+33	67	Qualification to Europa Conference League third qualifying round
5	Twente (O)	34	18	10	6	66	27	+39	64	Qualification to European competition play-offs
6	Sparta Rotterdam	34	17	8	9	60	37	+23	59	Qualification to European competition play-offs
7	Utrecht	34	15	9	10	55	50	+5	54	Qualification to European competition play-offs
8	Heerenveen	34	12	10	12	44	50	−6	46	Qualification to European competition play-offs
9	RKC Waalwijk	34	11	8	15	50	64	−14	41	
10	Vitesse	34	10	10	14	45	50	−5	40	
11	Go Ahead Eagles	34	10	10	14	46	56	−10	40	
12	NEC	34	8	15	11	42	45	−3	39	
13	Fortuna Sittard	34	10	6	18	39	62	−23	36	
14	Volendam	34	10	6	18	42	71	−29	36	
15	Excelsior	34	9	5	20	32	71	−39	32	
16	Emmen (R)	34	6	10	18	33	65	−32	28	Qualification to Relegation play-offs
17	Cambuur (R)	34	5	4	25	26	69	−43	19	Relegation to Eerste Divisie
18	Groningen (R)	34	4	6	24	31	75	−44	18	Relegation to Eerste Divisie

Source: Eredivisie
Rules for classification: Season in progress: 1) Most points won; 2) Less points lost; 3) Goal difference; 4) Goals scored; 5) Alphabetical order; End of season: 1) Points; 2) Goal difference; 3) Goals scored; 4) Head-to-head points; 5) Head-to-head goal difference; 6) Head-to-head away goals scored; 7) Play-off if relevant for deciding champion, relegation or participating in a European league, otherwise by draw. 8) Penalty shoot-out (only after a play-off)
(C) Champions; (O) Play-off Winner; (R) Relegated

== Results ==
=== Fixtures and results ===
Home \ Away	AJA	AZ	CAM	EMM	EXC	FEY	FOR	GAE	GRO	HEE	NEC	PSV	RKC	SPA	TWE	UTR	VIT	VOL
Ajax		0–0	4–0	3–1	7–1	2–3	4–0	1–1	6–1	5–0	1–0	1–2	3–1	4–0	0–0	3–1	2–2	1–1
AZ	2–1		2–1	5–1	5–0	1–3	3–1	2–0	1–0	1–1	1–1	1–2	3–0	0–1	1–1	5–5	1–1	2–1
Cambuur	0–5	0–1		1–2	0–2	0–3	1–2	4–1	0–1	1–2	0–1	3–0	4–0	0–3	0–1	0–3	0–3	0–3
Emmen	3–3	0–3	0–0		2–0	1–3	0–1	2–2	0–0	0–0	0–0	1–0	1–1	0–2	0–3	3–2	2–2	1–1
Excelsior	1–4	2–1	4–1	2–1		0–2	3–0	2–1	1–0	0–1	0–3	1–6	0–0	1–4	0–0	0–1	3–1	2–0
Feyenoord	1–1	2–1	1–0	4–0	5–1		1–1	3–0	1–0	0–0	2–0	2–2	5–1	3–0	2–0	3–1	0–1	2–1
Fortuna Sittard	2–3	0–3	1–4	0–1	1–0	2–4		0–2	3–1	2–0	1–1	2–2	0–0	0–0	0–3	3–4	2–0	2–0
Go Ahead Eagles	0–0	1–4	0–0	2–0	3–1	3–4	2–0		1–1	1–1	1–0	2–5	3–2	0–1	2–0	2–2	2–2	3–0
Groningen	2–3	1–4	0–1	1–1	3–0	0–3	2–3	1–0		0–2	0–1	4–2	2–3	0–5	1–1	1–2	0–1	2–2
Heerenveen	2–4	0–2	2–1	2–3	0–0	1–2	2–1	2–0	3–1		0–0	0–1	1–4	0–0	2–1	1–2	1–3	2–1
NEC	1–1	0–3	0–0	3–1	1–1	1–1	1–1	3–3	1–1	2–3		2–4	6–1	1–1	0–1	2–2	1–4	3–0
PSV Eindhoven	3–0	0–1	5–2	4–1	4–0	4–3	2–1	2–0	6–0	3–3	3–0		1–0	0–0	3–1	6–1	1–0	7–1
RKC Waalwijk	1–4	3–1	5–1	2–0	5–2	0–1	3–1	3–1	2–1	0–0	1–3	0–1		2–2	0–5	2–2	1–0	4–1
Sparta Rotterdam	0–1	2–3	4–1	3–1	1–0	1–3	3–1	2–1	2–1	4–0	2–0	0–1	0–0		1–1	0–3	3–1	4–0
Twente	3–1	2–1	4–0	2–0	4–0	1–1	3–0	1–1	3–0	3–3	4–0	2–1	3–0	3–3		2–0	3–0	3–0
Utrecht	0–2	1–2	0–0	3–2	1–0	1–1	1–2	1–2	2–1	1–0	0–0	2–2	2–0	3–1	1–0		1–0	0–0
Vitesse	1–2	0–1	2–0	2–1	0–0	2–5	1–2	2–0	6–0	0–4	0–0	1–1	2–2	0–4	2–2	2–0		1–1
Volendam	2–4	1–1	2–0	3–1	3–2	0–2	2–1	2–3	3–2	1–3	1–4	2–3	2–1	2–1	1–0	0–4	2–0	

Source: worldfootball.net
Legend: Blue = home team win; Yellow = draw; Red = away team win.
For upcoming matches, an "a" indicates there is an article about the rivalry between the two participants.

=== Results by round ===
Team ╲ Round	1	2	3	4	5	6	7	8	9	10	11	12	13	14	15	16	17	18	19	20	21	22	23	24	25	26	27	28	29	30	31	32	33	34
Ajax	W	W	W	W	W	W	L	D	W	W	W	D	L	D	D	D	D	D	W	W	W	W	W	W	W	L	D	W	W	L	D	W	W	L
AZ	W	W	W	D	W	D	W	W	W	L	L	W	L	W	D	W	W	W	D	D	W	L	W	W	W	L	D	L	W	W	D	W	W	L
Cambuur	L	D	W	L	L	L	L	W	D	L	L	L	L	L	L	D	L	W	L	L	D	L	L	W	L	L	L	L	L	L	L	L	L	W
Emmen	L	D	W	L	L	L	L	D	L	D	L	D	W	D	L	D	L	W	L	D	L	D	D	L	W	L	W	D	L	W	L	L	L	L
Excelsior	W	W	L	L	L	W	L	L	D	L	W	L	L	L	W	L	W	L	L	D	L	L	L	L	L	W	D	L	W	D	L	D	W	L
Feyenoord	W	D	W	W	W	W	L	D	W	W	D	W	W	W	D	W	D	W	D	D	W	W	W	W	W	W	W	W	W	W	W	W	W	L
Fortuna Sittard	L	L	L	L	L	D	W	W	W	D	D	L	L	W	L	D	L	W	W	D	W	L	L	W	L	L	W	L	L	L	W	L	L	D
Go Ahead Eagles	L	L	L	L	L	W	W	D	D	D	D	W	D	D	W	D	L	L	L	W	L	W	D	L	W	W	D	L	L	W	D	L	W	L
Groningen	D	L	W	D	L	W	L	L	L	L	W	D	L	L	L	L	L	L	L	D	L	D	W	L	L	L	L	L	L	L	D	L	L	L
Heerenveen	D	D	W	W	D	L	W	D	L	D	W	L	W	W	D	L	W	L	L	L	L	W	L	D	L	W	D	W	L	L	W	D	D	W
NEC	L	W	D	D	D	D	D	D	D	L	D	L	W	W	D	D	W	L	D	L	D	W	W	L	D	W	L	D	L	W	L	L	L	D
PSV Eindhoven	W	W	W	W	L	W	W	L	W	W	L	W	W	L	D	D	W	L	W	D	W	D	W	W	W	D	W	W	W	W	W	W	D	W
RKC Waalwijk	D	D	L	D	W	L	W	D	W	D	L	L	W	L	D	L	W	D	W	D	L	W	W	L	L	L	W	L	W	L	W	L	L	L
Sparta Rotterdam	D	L	L	W	W	L	W	D	W	W	L	W	W	D	D	W	W	D	D	D	W	L	L	W	W	W	L	W	W	D	L	L	W	W
Twente	W	W	L	W	W	D	L	W	L	W	W	W	D	D	W	D	W	D	D	D	W	L	L	D	W	W	D	W	L	D	W	W	W	W
Utrecht	D	D	L	L	W	W	D	W	L	L	W	W	W	W	D	D	L	W	D	W	L	D	W	L	D	L	D	W	W	L	W	W	L	W
Vitesse	L	L	L	D	W	L	D	L	L	W	W	D	L	D	D	D	L	D	W	D	W	L	L	L	L	D	L	W	W	D	L	W	W	W
Volendam	D	L	W	L	L	L	D	L	L	D	L	L	L	L	W	W	L	D	W	D	L	W	L	W	L	W	D	L	L	W	L	W	L	W

Source: worldfootball.net

== Play-offs ==
All times Central European Summer Time (UTC+2)

=== European competition play-offs ===
==== Bracket ====
Semi-finals
5	Twente	2	4	6
8	Heerenveen	1	0	1
6	Sparta Rotterdam (p)	2	0	2 (5)
7	Utrecht	1	1	2 (4)

Final
5	Twente	1	1	2
6	Sparta Rotterdam	1	0	1

==== Semi-finals ====
1 June 2023
18:45

Heerenveen	1–2	Twente
Haye 45+1'	Report	Černý 19'; Ugalde 90+3'

Abe Lenstra Stadion, Heerenveen
Attendance: 21,360
Referee: Marc Nagtegaal
4 June 2023
14:30

Twente	4–0	Heerenveen
Vlap 11'; Pröpper 22'; Brenet 45'; Misidjan 68'	Report

De Grolsch Veste, Enschede
Attendance: 29,000
Referee: Pol van Boekel

Twente won 6–1 on aggregate.

1 June 2023
21:00

Utrecht	1–2	Sparta Rotterdam
Douvikas 70'	Report	Van Crooij 29' (pen.); Lauritsen 39'

Stadion Galgenwaard, Utrecht
Attendance: 16,841
Referee: Sander van der Eijk
4 June 2023
18:00

Sparta Rotterdam	0–1 (a.e.t.)	Utrecht
	Report	Viergever 80'
Penalties
Van Crooij (penalty scored); Verschueren (penalty scored); Abels (penalty scored); Kitolano (penalty scored); Auassar (penalty missed); Sambo (penalty scored)	5–4	(penalty scored) Dost; (penalty scored) Booth; (penalty scored) Van De Streek; (penalty missed) Brouwers; (penalty scored) Bozdoğan; (penalty missed) Van der Hoorn

Het Kasteel, Rotterdam
Attendance: 10,599
Referee: Jochem Kamphuis

2–2 on aggregate. Sparta Rotterdam won 5–4 on penalties.

==== Final ====
8 June 2023
20:00

Sparta Rotterdam	1–1	Twente
Van Crooij 47' (pen.)	Report	Zerrouki 90+3'

Het Kasteel, Rotterdam
Attendance: 10,349
Referee: Jeroen Manschot
11 June 2023
14:30

Twente	1–0	Sparta Rotterdam
Brenet 53'	Report

De Grolsch Veste, Enschede
Attendance: 29,500
Referee: Danny Makkelie

Twente won 2–1 on aggregate.

=== Promotion/relegation play-offs ===
==== Bracket ====
First round
MVV Maastricht	0	1	1
NAC Breda	1	4	5
Willem II	2	2	4
VVV-Venlo (a.e.t.)	3	2	5
Almere City (a.e.t.)	0	3	3
Eindhoven	1	1	2

Semifinals
Emmen	2	2	4
NAC Breda	1	0	1
VVV-Venlo	1	1	2
Almere City (p)	1	1	2

Final
Emmen	0	1	1
Almere City	2	2	4

==== First round ====
22 May 2023
20:00

Eindhoven	1–0	Almere City
Dorenbosch 76'	Report

Jan Louwers Stadion, Eindhoven
Attendance: 3,518
Referee: Jannick van der Laan
26 May 2023
20:00

Almere City	3–1 (a.e.t.)	Eindhoven
Hilterman 80'; Limbombe 90+4'; Van La Parra 109'	Report	84' (pen.) Amevor

Yanmar Stadion, Almere
Attendance: 3,622
Referee: Marc Nagtegaal

Almere City won 3–2 on aggregate.

23 May 2023
18:45

VVV-Venlo	3–2	Willem II
Braken 41', 45+3' (pen.); Venema 65'	Report	13', 36' Hornkamp

De Koel, Venlo
Attendance: 5,392
Referee: Rob Dieperink
27 May 2023
16:30

Willem II	2–2 (a.e.t.)	VVV-Venlo
Kabangu 7'; Bosch 22'	Report	74' Venema; 120+1' Yasar

Koning Willem II Stadion, Tilburg
Attendance: 13,326
Referee: Ingmar Oostrom

VVV-Venlo won 5–4 on aggregate.

23 May 2023
21:00

NAC Breda	1–0	MVV Maastricht
Velanas 40' (pen.)	Report

Rat Verlegh Stadion, Breda
Attendance: 14,361
Referee: Alex Bos
27 May 2023
20:00

MVV Maastricht	1–4	NAC Breda
Livramento 67'	Report	20' Ómarsson; 29' Agougil; 38' Banzuzi; 90+3' Herrmann

De Geusselt, Maastricht
Attendance: 8,223
Referee: Erwin Blank

NAC Breda won 5–1 on aggregate.

==== Semifinals ====
30 May 2023
20:00

VVV-Venlo	1–1	Almere City
Van Rooijen 7'	Report	29' Limbombe

De Koel, Venlo
Attendance: 7,201
Referee: Martin van den Kerkhof
3 June 2023
16:30

Almere City	1–1 (a.e.t.)	VVV-Venlo
Duijvestijn 50'	Report	62' Allouch
Penalties
Van La Parra (penalty missed); Alhaft (penalty missed); Duijvestijn (penalty scored); Peña (penalty scored)	2–0	(penalty missed) Venema; (penalty missed) Allouch; (penalty missed) Koglin; (penalty missed) De Boer

Yanmar Stadion, Almere
Attendance: 4,019
Referee: Edwin van de Graaf

2–2 on aggregate. Almere City won 2–0 on penalties.

31 May 2023
18:45

NAC Breda	1–2	Emmen
Omgba 90+4'	Report	24' Burnet; 39' Romeny

Rat Verlegh Stadion, Breda
Attendance: 18,596
Referee: Joey Kooij
3 June 2023
20:00

Emmen	2–0	NAC Breda
Živković 62'; Assehnoun 90+4'	Report

De Oude Meerdijk, Emmen
Attendance: 8,309
Referee: Bas Nijhuis

Emmen won 4–1 on aggregate.

==== Final ====
6 June 2023
20:00

Almere City	2–0	Emmen
Duijvestijn 65' (pen.), 77'	Report

Yanmar Stadion, Almere
Attendance: 4,121
Referee: Danny Makkelie
11 June 2023
18:00

Emmen	1–2	Almere City
Vlak 58'	Report	50' Van La Parra; 53' Smeets

De Oude Meerdijk, Emmen
Referee: Allard Lindhout

Almere City won 4–1 on aggregate.

== Statistics ==
=== Top scorers ===
Rank	Player	Club	Goals
1	(Greece) Anastasios Douvikas	Utrecht	19
1	(Netherlands) Xavi Simons	PSV Eindhoven	19
3	(Netherlands) Sydney van Hooijdonk	Heerenveen	16
4	(Mexico) Santiago Giménez	Feyenoord	15
5	(Netherlands) Luuk de Jong	PSV Eindhoven	14
6	(Netherlands) Brian Brobbey	Ajax	13
7	(Netherlands) Steven Bergwijn	Ajax	12
7	(Czech Republic) Václav Černý	Twente	12
7	(Netherlands) Michiel Kramer	RKC Waalwijk	12
7	(Greece) Vangelis Pavlidis	AZ	12
7	(United States) Ricardo Pepi	Groningen	12

=== Hat-tricks ===
Rnd	Player	Club	Goals	Date	Home	Score	Away
2	(Netherlands) Steven Bergwijn	Ajax	4', 45', 57'	14 August 2022	Ajax	6–1	Groningen
3	(Netherlands) Sydney van Hooijdonk	Heerenveen	5', 72', 77'	20 August 2022	Vitesse	0–4	Heerenveen
3	(Netherlands) Cody Gakpo	PSV Eindhoven	25' (p), 39', 51'	31 August 2022	PSV Eindhoven	7–1	Volendam
5	(Greece) Anastasios Douvikas	Utrecht	71' (p), 77', 86'	2 September 2022	Fortuna Sittard	3–4	Utrecht
19	(Greece) Anastasios Douvikas	Utrecht	12', 16', 65'	28 January 2023	AZ	5–5	Utrecht
19	(Greece) Vangelis Pavlidis	AZ	31', 34', 78'	28 January 2023	AZ	5–5	Utrecht
30	(Netherlands) Ole Romeny	Emmen	47', 75', 90+2'	22 April 2023	Heerenveen	2–3	Emmen
33	(Netherlands) Million Manhoef	Vitesse	4', 56', 74'	21 May 2023	Vitesse	6–0	Groningen

=== Top assists ===
Rank	Player	Club	Assists
1	(Serbia) Dušan Tadić	Ajax	17
2	(Netherlands) Cody Gakpo	PSV Eindhoven	12
3	(Netherlands) Carel Eiting	Volendam	11
3	(Netherlands) Vito van Crooij	Sparta Rotterdam	11
5	(Czech Republic) Václav Černý	Twente	10
6	(Netherlands) Steven Berghuis	Ajax	9
6	(Netherlands) Mats Seuntjens	RKC Waalwijk	9
6	(Netherlands) Gijs Smal	Twente	9
6	(Morocco) Oussama Tannane	NEC	9
6	(Netherlands) Joey Veerman	PSV Eindhoven	9

=== Clean sheets ===
Rank	Player	Club	Clean sheets
1	(Germany) Lars Unnerstall	Twente	15
2	(Netherlands) Nick Olij	Sparta Rotterdam	13
3	(Netherlands) Justin Bijlow	Feyenoord	12
4	(Greece) Vasilis Barkas	Utrecht	10
4	(Argentina) Walter Benítez	PSV Eindhoven	10
6	(Netherlands) Jasper Cillessen	NEC	9
7	(Netherlands) Jeffrey de Lange	Go Ahead Eagles	7
7	(Netherlands) Andries Noppert	Heerenveen	7
7	(Croatia) Ivor Pandur	Fortuna Sittard	7
7	(Argentina) Gerónimo Rulli	Ajax	7
7	(Netherlands) Stijn van Gassel	Excelsior	7

=== Discipline ===
==== Player ====
- Most yellow cards: 10
  - (Mexico) Edson Álvarez (Ajax)
- Most red cards: 2
  - (Haiti) Carlens Arcus (Vitesse)
  - (Morocco) Iliass Bel Hassani (RKC Waalwijk)
  - (Turkey) Doğan Erdoğan (Fortuna Sittard)
  - (Netherlands) Mees Hoedemakers (Cambuur)
  - (Netherlands) Shurandy Sambo (Sparta Rotterdam)

==== Club ====
- Most yellow cards: 60
  - Fortuna Sittard
- Most red cards: 5
  - Vitesse
- Fewest yellow cards: 41
  - Emmen
  - PSV Eindhoven
  - Sparta Rotterdam
  - Volendam
- Fewest red cards: 0
  - Feyenoord
  - Utrecht

== Awards ==
=== Monthly awards ===
Month	Player of the Month		Talent of the Month		Ref.	Team of the Month
Month	Player	Club	Player	Club	Ref.	Team of the Month
August	Xavi Simons	PSV Eindhoven	Brian Brobbey	Ajax		Noppert (Heerenveen); Smal (Twente), Trauner (Feyenoord), Van Ewijk (Heerenveen); J. Veerman (PSV Eindhoven), Clasie (AZ), Simons (PSV Eindhoven); Gakpo (PSV Eindhoven), Bergwijn (Ajax), Brobbey (Ajax), Van Hooijdonk (Heerenveen)
September	Cody Gakpo	PSV Eindhoven	Nathan Tjoe-A-On	Excelsior		Cillessen (NEC); Chatzidiakos (AZ), Blind (Ajax), Tjoe-A-On (Excelsior); Anita (RKC Waalwijk), Reijnders (AZ), Kökçü (Feyenoord), Kudus (Ajax); Odgaard (AZ), Gakpo (PSV Eindhoven), Bergwijn (Ajax)
October	Cody Gakpo	PSV Eindhoven	Brian Brobbey	Ajax		Pandur (Fortuna Sittard); Veldmate (Emmen), Hancko (Feyenoord), Pinto (Sparta Rotterdam); Verschueren (Sparta Rotterdam), Berghuis (Ajax), Kökçü (Feyenoord), Köhlert (Heerenveen); Misidjan (Twente), Brobbey (Ajax), Gakpo (PSV Eindhoven)
November	Taylor Booth	Utrecht	Kenneth Taylor	Ajax		Virgínia (Cambuur); Van Ewijk (Heerenveen), Hancko (Feyenoord), Smal (Twente); Taylor (Ajax), Rommens (Go Ahead Eagles), Kökçü (Feyenoord), El Karouani (NEC); Szymański (Feyenoord), Lauritsen (Sparta Rotterdam), Booth (Utrecht)
January	Nick Olij	Sparta Rotterdam	Xavi Simons	PSV Eindhoven		Olij (Sparta Rotterdam); Smal (Twente), Álvarez (Ajax), Arcus (Vitesse), Teze (PSV Eindhoven); Simons (PSV Eindhoven), Zerrouki (Twente), Klaassen (Ajax); Douvikas (Utrecht), Pavlidis (AZ), Adekanye (Go Ahead Eagles)
February	Steven Berghuis	Ajax	Johan Bakayoko	PSV Eindhoven		Cillessen (NEC); Geertruida (Feyenoord), Timber (Ajax), Álvarez (Ajax); Bakayoko (PSV Eindhoven), Berghuis (Ajax), Veerman (PSV Eindhoven), Simons (PSV Eindhoven); Kudus (Ajax), Pepi (Groningen), Tadić (Ajax)
March	Xavi Simons	PSV Eindhoven	Manfred Ugalde	Twente		Stanković (Volendam); Sugawara (AZ), Geertruida (Feyenoord), Chatzidiakos (AZ), Pinto (Sparta Rotterdam); Kökçü (Feyenoord), Simons (PSV Eindhoven), Saito (Sparta Rotterdam); Van Crooij (Sparta Rotterdam), Ugalde (Twente), Karlsson (AZ)
April	Luuk de Jong	PSV Eindhoven	Santiago Giménez	Feyenoord		Van Gassel (Excelsior); Pinto (Sparta Rotterdam), Mirani (Volendam), Sánchez (Ajax); Reijnders (AZ), Kökçü (Feyenoord), Til (PSV Eindhoven); Paixão (Feyenoord), De Jong (PSV Eindhoven), Kramer (RKC Waalwijk), Giménez (Feyenoord)
May	Václav Černý	Twente	Million Manhoef	Vitesse		Unnerstall (Twente); Geertruida (Feyenoord), Beukema (AZ), Hato (Ajax); Manhoef (Vitesse), Clasie (AZ), Vlap (Twente), Antonucci (Volendam); Černý (Twente), Douvikas (Utrecht), Simons (PSV Eindhoven)

=== Annual awards ===
Award	Player	Club	Ref.
Player of the Season	(Turkey) Orkun Kökçü	Feyenoord	
Talent of the Season	(Netherlands) Xavi Simons	PSV Eindhoven	
Goal of the Season	(Netherlands) Michiel Kramer	RKC Waalwijk	

=== Team of the Season ===
Team of the Season
Goalkeeper	(Netherlands) Justin Bijlow (Feyenoord)				
Defenders	(Netherlands) Lutsharel Geertruida (Feyenoord)			(Slovakia) Dávid Hancko (Feyenoord)	
Midfielders	(Turkey) Orkun Kökçü (Feyenoord)		(Netherlands) Joey Veerman (PSV Eindhoven)		(Netherlands) Xavi Simons (PSV Eindhoven)
Forwards	(Netherlands) Steven Bergwijn (Ajax)	(Serbia) Dušan Tadić (Ajax)	(Ghana) Mohammed Kudus (Ajax)	(Greece) Vangelis Pavlidis (AZ Alkmaar)	(Netherlands) Luuk de Jong (PSV Eindhoven)

== Attendances ==
Ajax drew the highest average home attendance in the 2022-23 edition of the Eredivisie.

#	Football club	Home games	Average attendance
1	AFC Ajax	17	53,582
2	Feyenoord	17	47,500
3	PSV	17	31,923
4	FC Twente	17	29,212
5	sc Heerenveen	17	21,030
6	FC Utrecht	17	19,769
7	FC Groningen	17	18,521
8	AZ	17	16,967
9	Vitesse	17	15,129
10	NEC	17	12,405
11	Sparta Rotterdam	17	10,229
12	Fortuna Sittard	17	10,187
13	Cambuur Leeuwarden	17	9,822
14	Go Ahead Eagles	17	9,679
15	FC Emmen	17	8,152
16	FC Volendam	17	6,663
17	RKC Waalwijk	17	5,980
18	Excelsior	17	4,336
