= Jubbega =

Jubbega Jobbegea Jubbega-Schurega
- Village
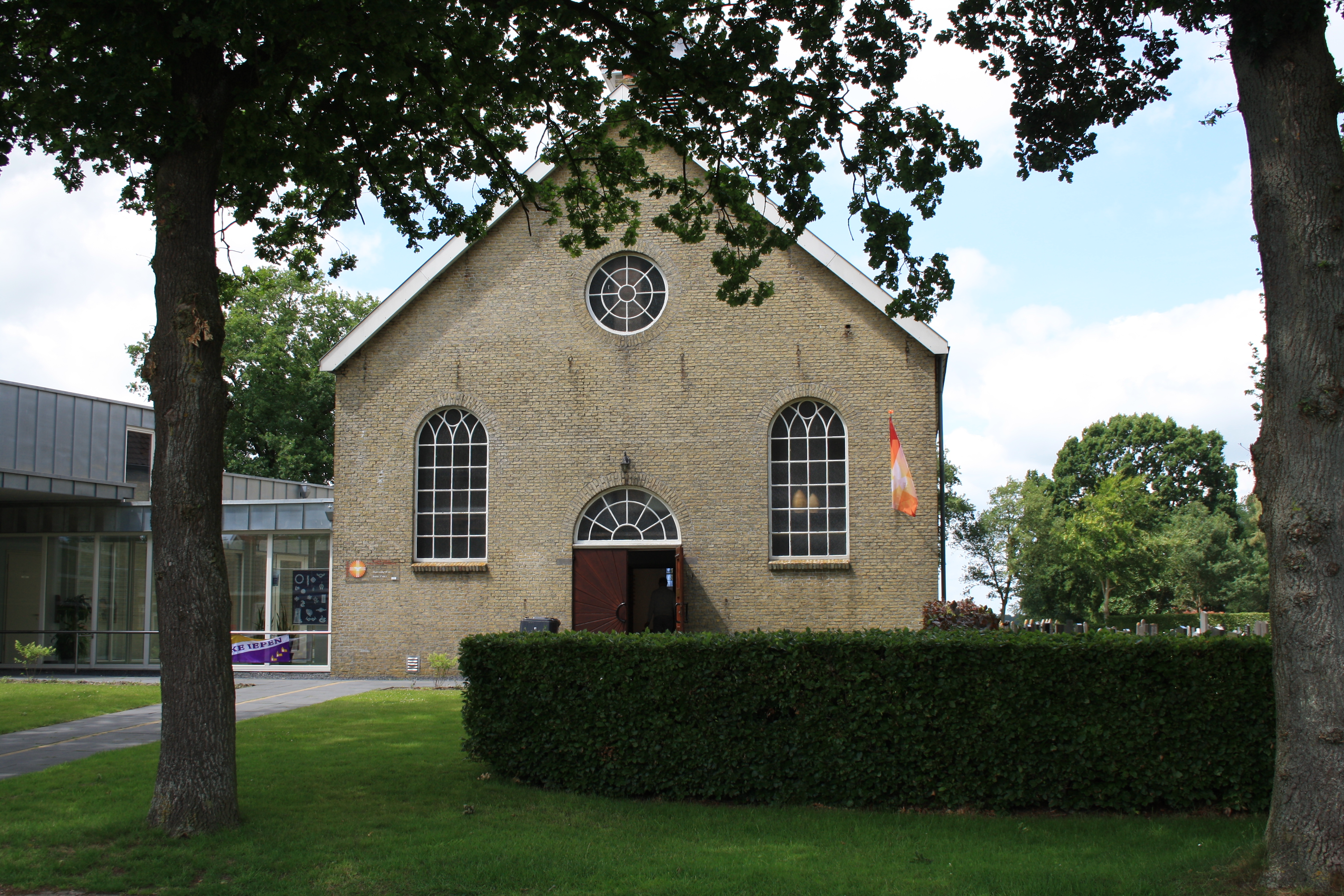
- Jubbega church

- Flag

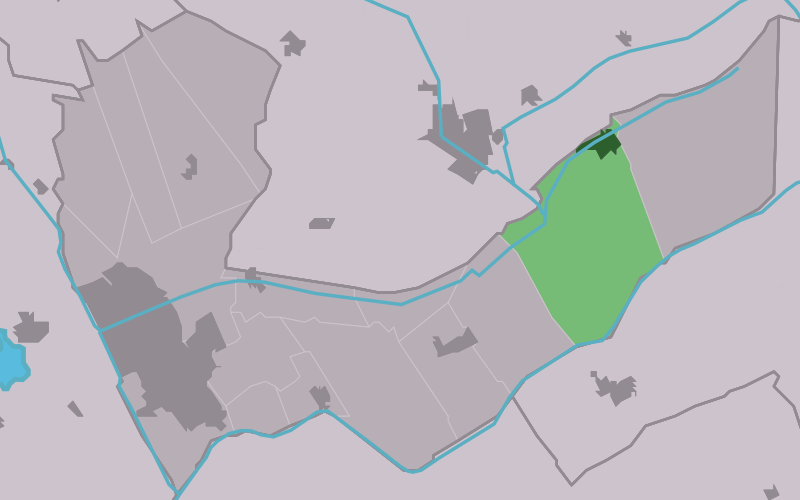
- Location in the Heerenveen municipality

- Location in the Netherlands Jubbega (Netherlands)
- Country: Netherlands
- Province: Friesland
- Municipality: Heerenveen

Area
  - Total: 17.07 km^{2} (6.59 sq mi)
- Elevation: 2 m (6.6 ft)

Population (2021)
  - Total: 3,255
  - Density: 190.7/km^{2} (493.9/sq mi)
- Time zone: UTC+1 (CET)
  - Summer (DST): UTC+2 (CEST)
- Postal code: 8411
- Dialing code: 0516

Jubbega (West Frisian: Jobbegea) is a village in the north of the Netherlands, located in the municipality of Heerenveen, Friesland. In 2021, it had a population of 3,255, mai

== History ==
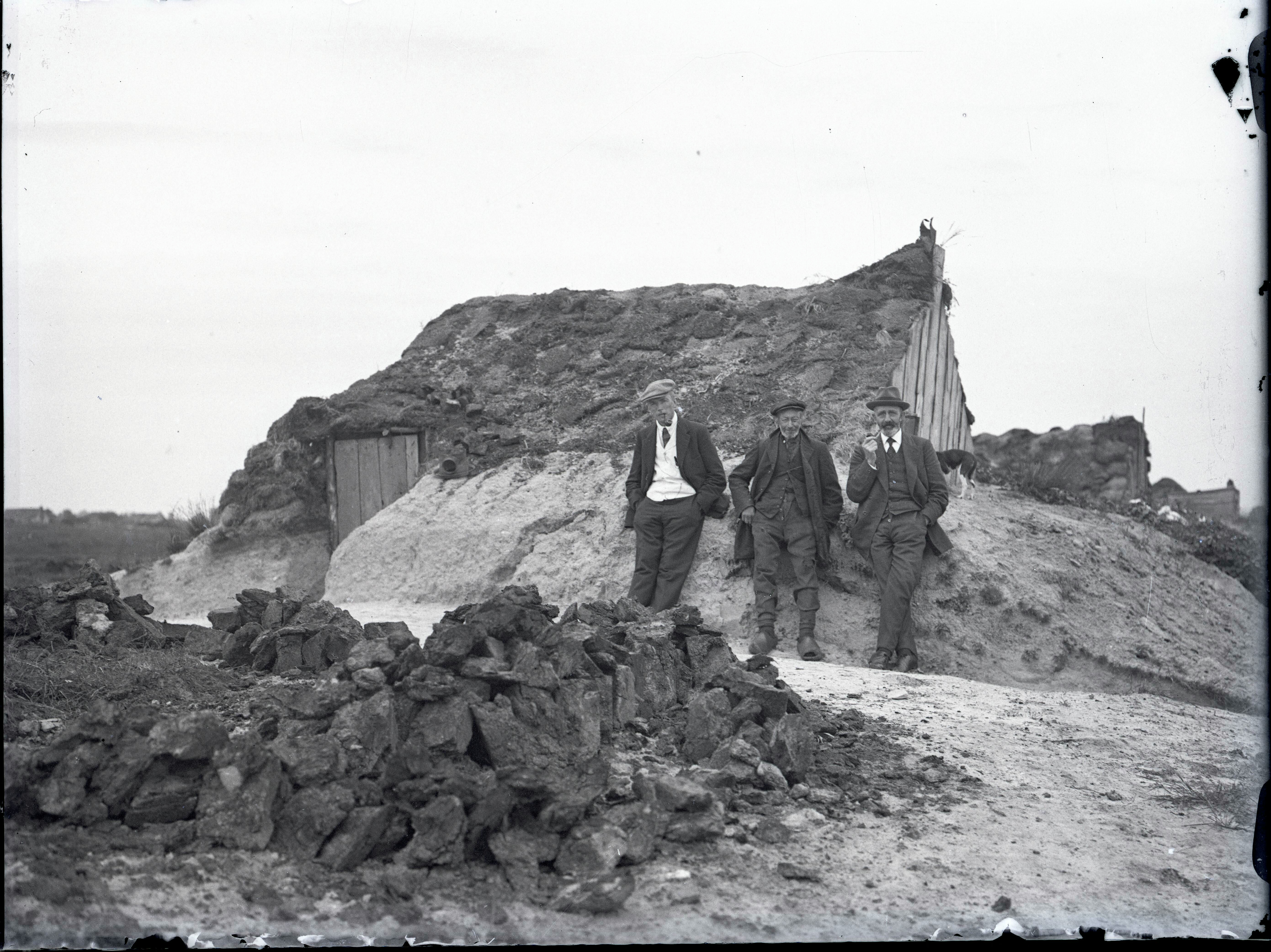
Sod house in 1923. The owner is standing in the middle

=== 15th–18th century ===
The village was first mentioned in 1408 as Jobbegae, and means village of Jobbe (person). The village merged with neighbouring Schurega, together known as Jubbega-Schurega.

The Dutch Reformed Church in Jubbega was completed in 1715. The tower was completed in 1910. In 1774, a new sluice was constructed for the peat excavation and a little settlement developed around the sluice.

=== 19th–21st century ===
In 1840, Jubbega-Schurega was home to 203 people.

In 1934, the municipality of Schoterland was split up. Jubbega was annexed to Heerenveen. In the 1950s–1970s, the population of Jubbega hovered around 3000. In 1974, the name of the village was shortened to Jubbega.

Since the late 1990s, the number of inhabitants varies around 3300.

1840	1954	1959	1965	1969	1974	1999	2005	2010	2017	2021
203	2923	3001	2928	3018	2958	3260	3372	3350	3275	3255

== Gallery ==
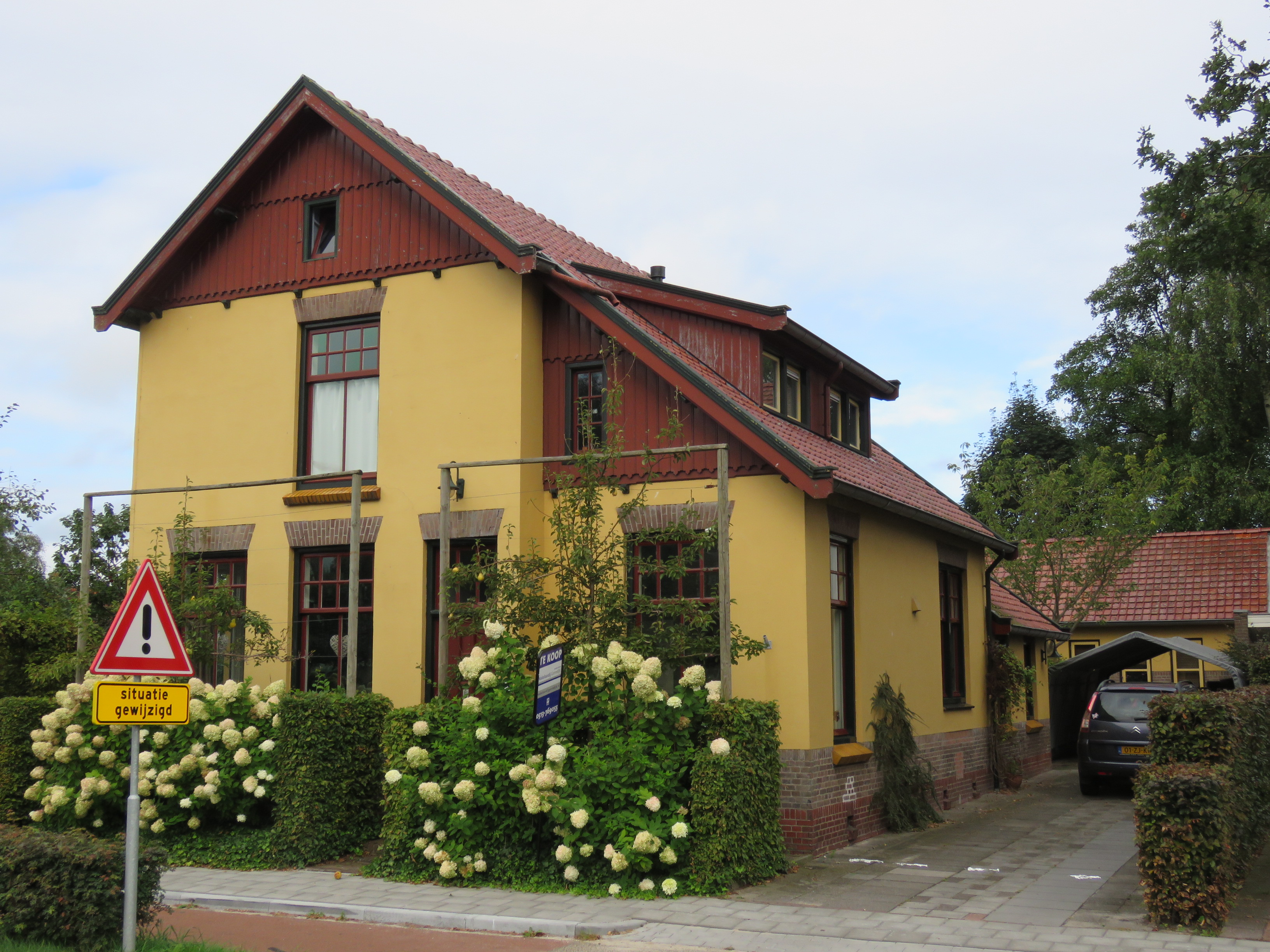
Former teacher's house

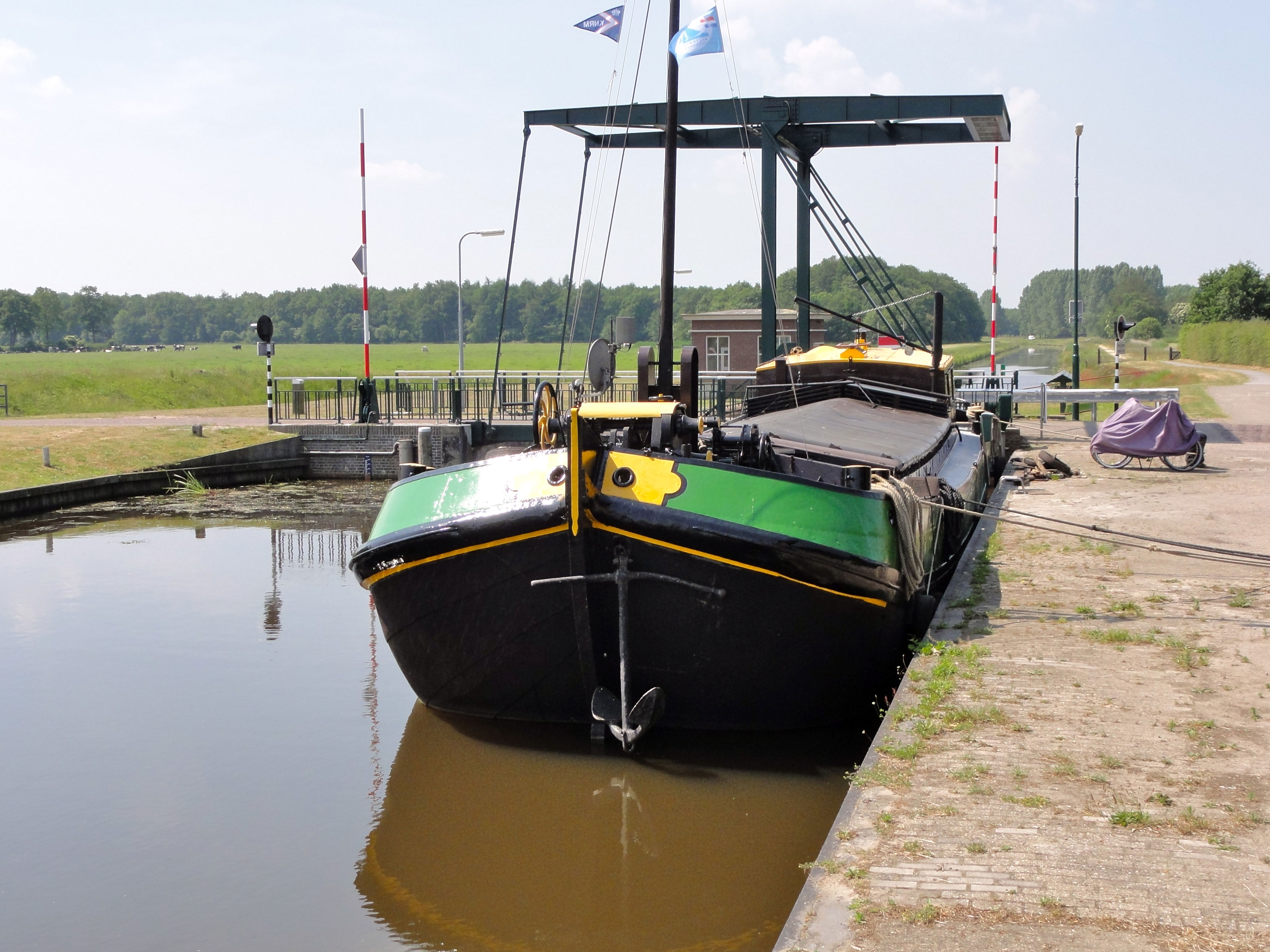
Ship in the lock at Jubbega

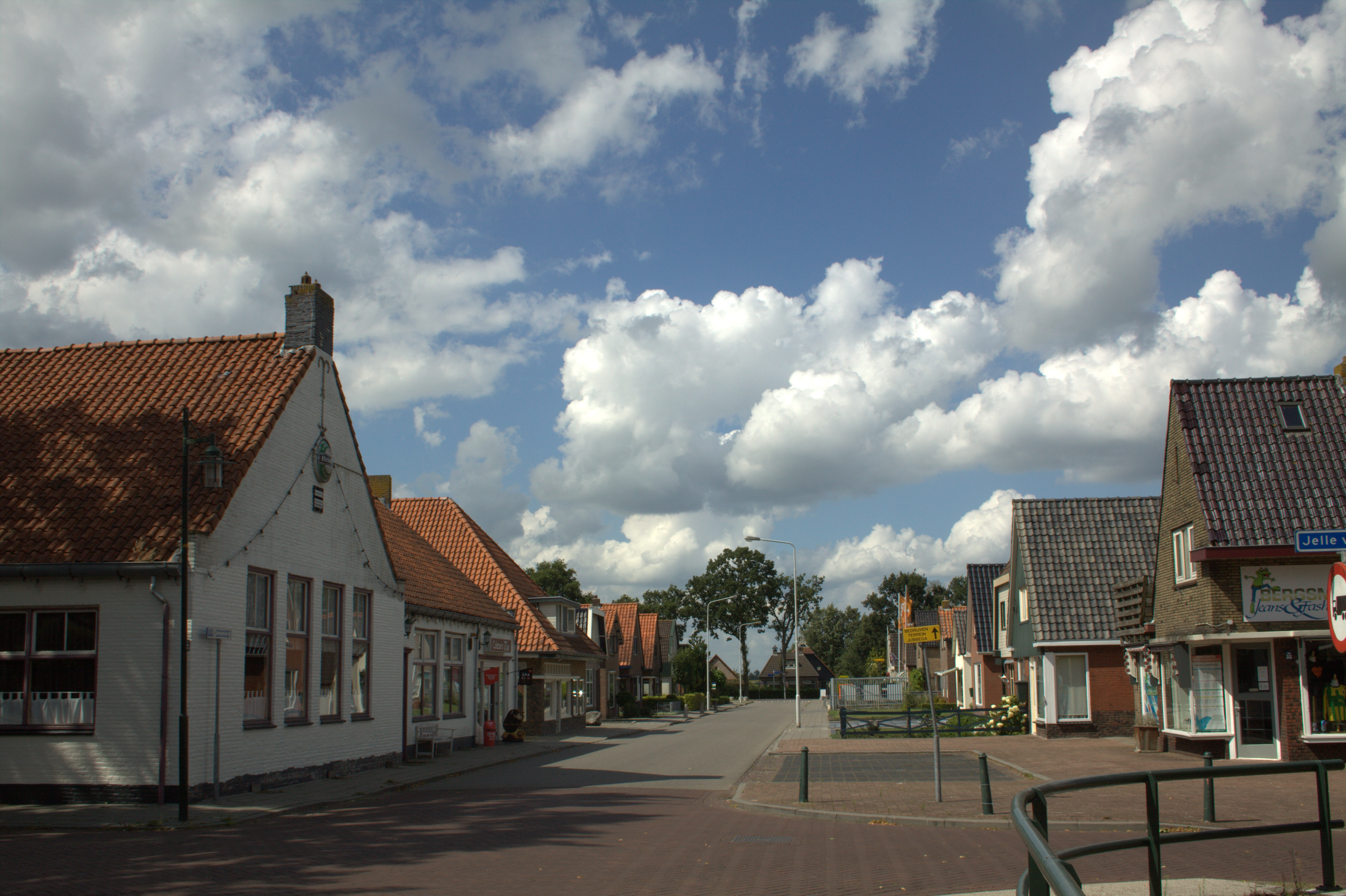
Street view
