= Syb van Ottele =

Dutch footballer (born 2002)

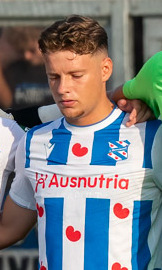
- Van Ottele with Heerenveen in 2023

Personal information
- Date of birth: 2 February 2002 (age 24)
- Place of birth: Nijmegen, Netherlands
- Height: 1.85 m (6 ft 1 in)
- Position: Centre-back

Team information
- Current team: Fortuna Sittard
- Number: 6

Youth career
- RKSV Brakkenstein
- 2012–2020: NEC

Senior career*
Years	Team	Apps	(Gls)
2020–2021	NEC	9	(0)
2021–2024	Heerenveen	52	(1)
2024–	Fortuna Sittard	46	(0)

International career
2017	Netherlands U15	3	(0)
2017–2019	Netherlands U16	7	(2)
2018–2019	Netherlands U17	9	(0)
2019	Netherlands U18	1	(0)
Medal record
Representing Netherlands
UEFA European Under-17 Championship
Winner	Ireland 2019	U-17 Team
- * Club domestic league appearances and goals as of 21 May 2026

Syb van Ottele (born 2 February 2002) is a Dutch professional footballer who plays as a centre-back for Eredivisie club Fortuna Sittard.

== Career ==
Born in Nijmegen, Van Ottele progressed through the NEC youth academy, which he joined in 2012. On 27 February 2018, when several European clubs wanted to recruit him, he signed his first contract with his childhood club, where he was considered one of their great prospects. Van Ottele made his professional debut for NEC in a 2–0 Eerste Divisie loss to SC Cambuur on 28 August 2020, coming on as a substitute for Édgar Barreto.

On 8 January 2021, Van Ottele signed his first professional contract with Heerenveen in the Eredivisie. Heerenveen technical director, Gerry Hamstra welcomed the signing, and described Van Ottele as a talented and versatile player who is comfortable in possession.

On 13 July 2024, Van Ottele moved to Fortuna Sittard.

== Honours ==
Netherlands U17

- UEFA European Under-17 Championship: 2019
