= Abe Lenstra Stadion =

Football stadium in Heerenveen, Netherlands

Coordinates: 52°57′31″N 5°56′10″E

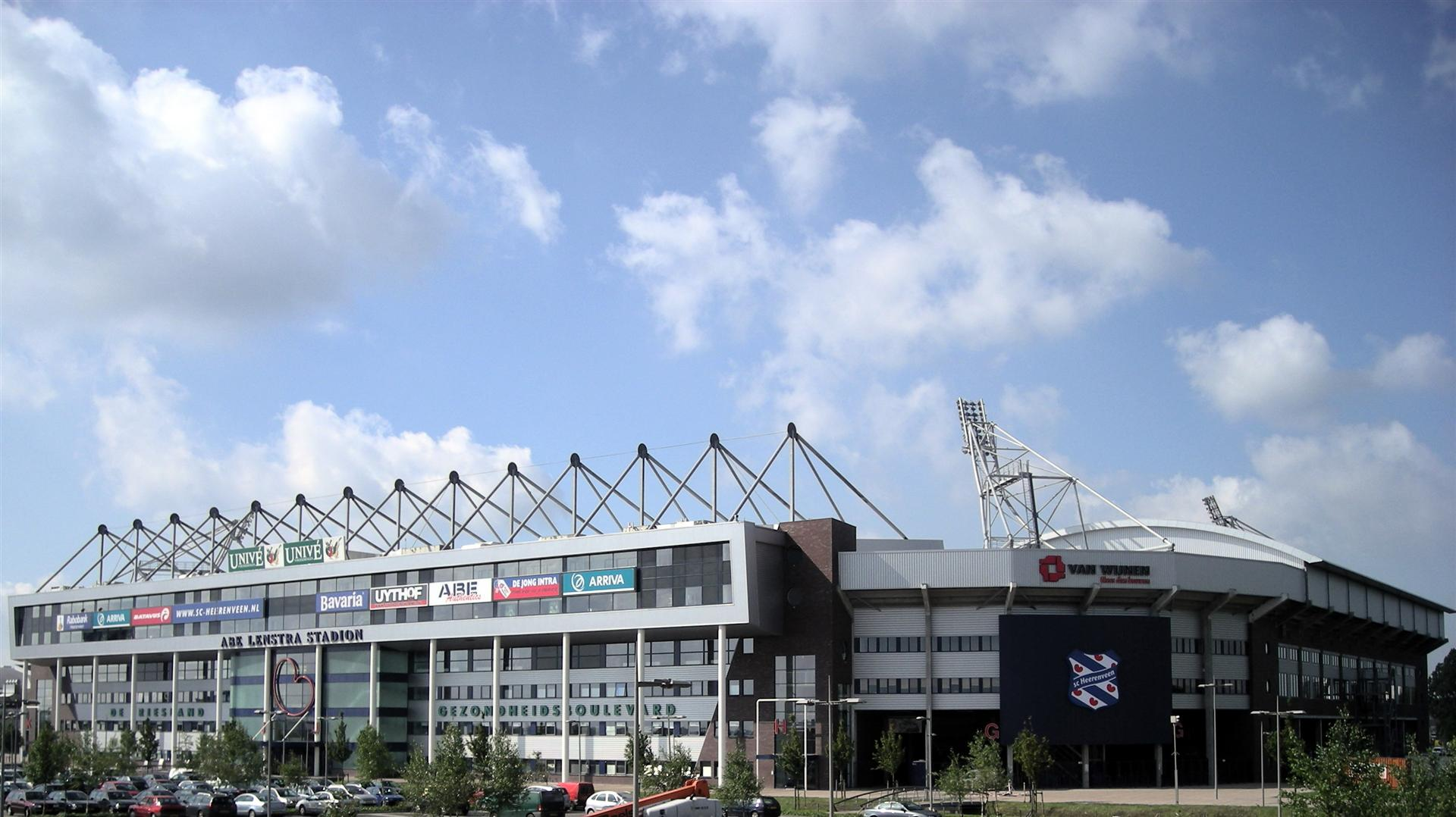
- UEFA
- Interactive map of Abe Lenstra Stadion
- Full name: Abe Lenstra Stadion
- Location: Heerenveen, Netherlands
- Owner: Sportstad Heerenveen
- Capacity: 27,224
- Surface: Grass
- Scoreboard: Yes

Construction
- Built: 1993
- Opened: 20 August 1994
- Architect: Alynia Architecten Harlingen B.V.

Tenant
- SC Heerenveen

Abe Lenstra Stadion (Dutch pronunciation: [ˌaːbə ˈlɛnstraː ˌstaːdijɔn]) is a football stadium, located in Heerenveen, Netherlands. It is currently used mostly as a home ground for Eredivisie club Heerenveen. The current capacity is 27,224.

== Naming ==
The stadium is named after Abe Lenstra, generally considered to be the greatest Heerenveen player in the history of the club. Abe was born on November 27, 1920, in Heerenveen and joined the club at the age of 15. After almost 17 years at Heerenveen, he joined SC Enschede in 1954. He left this club in 1960 to join SC Enschede's archrival Enschedese Boys. In 1963, he stopped playing football at the age of 42. In total, he scored 700 goals in about 730 matches. Abe died on 2 September 1985, at the age of 64, on the eve of what was to become the only international match played in the community sports park that would later become the (old) Abe Lenstra Stadium.

== Construction of the stadium ==
Construction of the stadium began in 1993. The plan was to build a stadium with open corners, but when the construction was well underway, the club decided to close the gaps. At the time the building was finished, it had a maximum capacity of 14,500.

On 20 August 1994, the stadium was officially opened by Prince Willem-Alexander of the Dutch royal family. He made the symbolic first kick-off in this stadium. After the opening the first match started between SC Heerenveen and PSV Eindhoven. At the time Ronaldo played at PSV, this match was his first one in Europe.

== Expansions ==
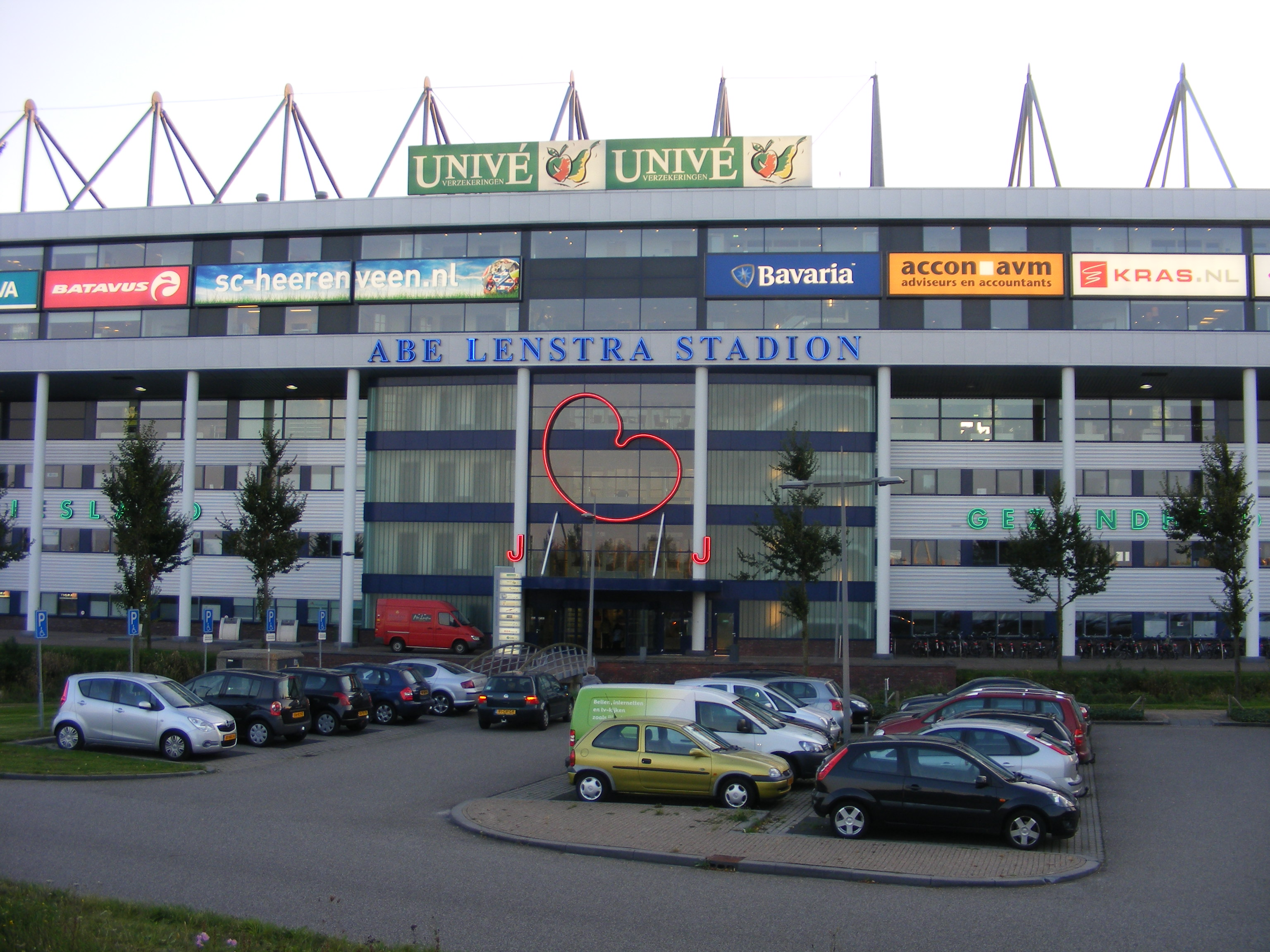
East entrance of the stadion

As SC Heerenveen continued to grow and improve its results year after year, the club planned its first stadium expansion in 2002. The stadium's capacity was almost doubled to 26,100 seats.

Throughout the years, empty spots in the stadium were filled with seats. In conjunction with other changes to the stadium, the seating capacity increased to its current 26,800.

In 2011, a plan was proposed to expand the stadium, increasing its capacity to 32,000. The construction should be ready for the start of the 2012–13 Eredivisie season. The reason for the expansion is the ever-growing waiting list for the club's season tickets.

Additionally, the presence of more people in the stadium translates to increased revenue, which in turn leads to a larger budget for the club to work with. However, this expansion was seen as too risky and financially unfeasible.

There were plans to expand the stadium to 29,000 seats over the summer of 2012; however, the economic downturn shelved these plans.

== World Cup bid ==
The stadium was one of five stadiums in the Netherlands selected by the KNVB to host games as part of the combined Belgium–Netherlands 2018 FIFA World Cup bid. A successful bid would have meant that the stadium capacity would have been increased to the minimum required seating of 44,000 In December 2010 FIFA announced that Russia would host the 2018 World Cup. Just before the announcement of the World Cup, the club announced that the next expansion would be postponed.

The other four selected host cities in the Netherlands were Amsterdam (Amsterdam Arena and Olympisch Stadion), Rotterdam (Feijenoord Stadion De Kuip and De Nieuwe Kuip), Eindhoven (Philips Stadion) and Enschede (De Grolsch Veste).

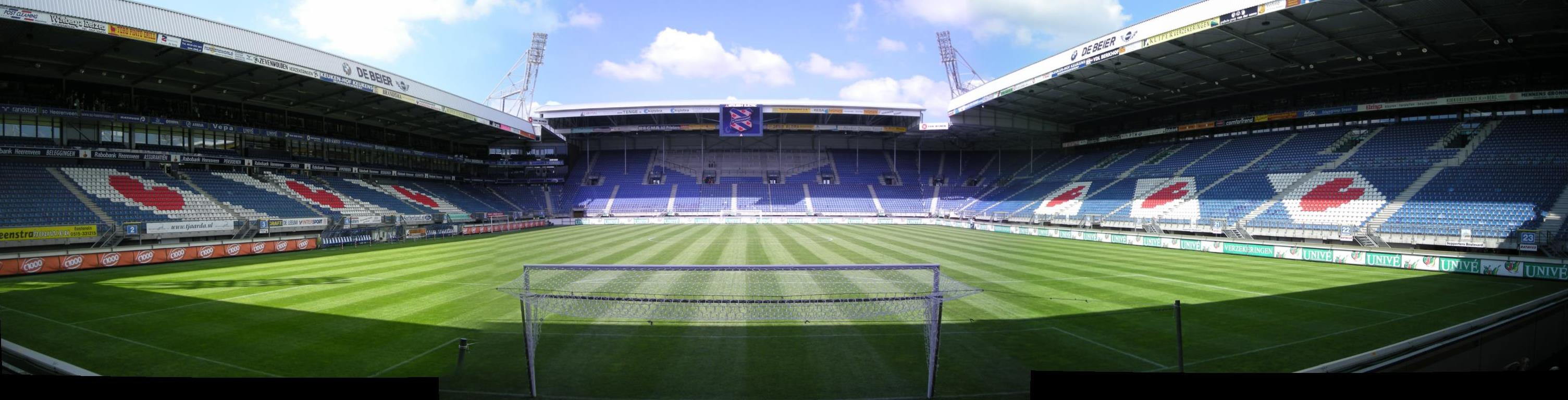

== 2024 UEFA Women's Nations League Finals ==
The stadium was one of three selected to host the 2024 UEFA Women's Nations League Finals matches. It will host 1 match.

Date	Team No. 1	Result	Team No. 2	Round
28 February 2024	Netherlands	0–2	Germany	3rd place

== See also ==
- List of football stadiums in the Netherlands
- Lists of stadiums
