= 2024–25 SC Heerenveen season =

Season of a Dutch football club

SC Heerenveen
2024–25 season
- Manager: Robin van Persie (until 23 February); Henk Brugge (interim; 23 February – 24 March); Robin Veldman (from 24 March)
- Stadium: Abe Lenstra Stadion
- Eredivisie: 9th
- KNVB Cup: Round of 16
- Top goalscorer: League: Ion Nicolaescu (8); All: Ion Nicolaescu (12)
- Highest home attendance: 25,248 (19th Eredivisie round against Ajax)
- Lowest home attendance: 20,809 (3rd Eredivisie round against NAC Breda)
- Average home league attendance: 23,389
- Biggest win: 4–0 (NAC Breda, 3rd Eredivisie round)
- Biggest defeat: 1–9 (AZ, 4th Eredivisie round)
Home colours	Away colours	Third colours

The 2024–25 season was the 105th season in the history of SC Heerenveen, and the club's 32nd consecutive season in the Eredivisie. In addition to the domestic league, the club competed in the KNVB Cup, being eliminated in the round of 16 following a 3–2 loss to Quick Boys.

The club finished 9th in the Eredivisie, the lowest position to reach the European competition play-offs, where Heerenveen lost 4–1 in the semi-finals to AZ.

Ion Nicolaescu was the top scorer of the club in this season with nine goals in the Eredivisie (including the play-offs) and three goals in the KNVB Cup.

Levi Smans made the most appearances with 37 across the season: 34 appearances in the Eredivisie (including the play-offs) and three appearances in the KNVB Cup.

Oliver Braude was the most booked player of the club during the season, with 11 yellow cards.

== Players ==
=== First-team squad ===
As of 29 January 2025

Note: Flags indicate national team as defined under FIFA eligibility rules; some limited exceptions apply. Players may hold more than one non-FIFA nationality.

No.	Pos.	Nation	Player
2	DF	NED	Denzel Hall
3	DF	NED	Jordy de Wijs (on loan from Fortuna Düsseldorf)
4	DF	NED	Sam Kersten
5	DF	POL	Paweł Bochniewicz
6	MF	GER	Amara Condé
7	FW	NED	Ché Nunnely
8	MF	NED	Luuk Brouwers (captain)
10	MF	MAR	Ilias Sebaoui (on loan from Feyenoord)
11	DF	GER	Mats Köhlert
13	GK	NED	Mickey van der Hart
14	MF	NED	Levi Smans
15	DF	IRQ	Hussein Ali
16	MF	SWE	Marcus Linday
17	DF	NOR	Nikolai Hopland
18	FW	MDA	Ion Nicolaescu

No.	Pos.	Nation	Player
20	FW	DEN	Jacob Trenskow
21	MF	NED	Espen van Ee
22	GK	NED	Bernt Klaverboer
23	GK	NED	Jan Bekkema
24	FW	SRB	Miloš Luković (on loan from Strasbourg)
26	FW	GRE	Dimitris Rallis
27	DF	SRB	Mateja Milovanović
28	DF	BUL	Hristiyan Petrov
30	FW	IRI	Alireza Jahanbakhsh
32	MF	NED	Melle Witteveen
35	MF	NED	Ties Oostra
39	MF	CUW	Isaiah Ahmed
44	GK	NED	Andries Noppert
45	DF	NOR	Oliver Braude
50	MF	NED	Eser Gürbüz

== Transfers ==
=== In ===
Pos.	Player	Transferred from	Fee	Date	Source
MF	(Netherlands) Luuk Brouwers	(Netherlands) FC Utrecht	€750,000	1 July 2024	
MF	(Germany) Amara Condé	(Germany) 1. FC Magdeburg	€500,000	11 July 2024	
DF	(Serbia) Mateja Milovanovic	(Netherlands) AFC Ajax	Free transfer	11 July 2024	
MF	(Morocco) Ilias Sebaoui	(Netherlands) Feyenoord	Loan	23 July 2024	
DF	(Norway) Nikolai Hopland	(Norway) Aalesunds FK	Loan	9 August 2024	
FW	(Denmark) Jacob Trenskow	(Sweden) Kalmar FF	€1,200,000	9 August 2024	
FW	(Iran) Alireza Jahanbakhsh	Unattached (Note: Most recently played for Feyenoord)	Free transfer	6 November 2024	
MF	(Sweden) Marcus Linday	(Sweden) Västerås SK	€1,500,000	1 January 2025	
DF	(Netherlands) Jordy de Wijs	(Germany) Fortuna Düsseldorf	Loan	2 January 2025	
DF	(Bulgaria) Hristiyan Petrov	(Bulgaria) CSKA Sofia	Loan	7 January 2025	

=== Out ===
Pos.	Player	Transferred to	Fee	Date	Source
MF	(Cyprus) Loizos Loizou	(Cyprus) Omonia Nicosia	End of contract	1 July 2024	
MF	(Indonesia) Thom Haye	(Netherlands) Almere City	End of contract	1 July 2024	
MF	(Morocco) Anas Tahiri	(Netherlands) Almere City	End of contract	1 July 2024	
DF	(Netherlands) Syb van Ottele	(Netherlands) Fortuna Sittard	End of contract	1 July 2024	
DF	(Indonesia) Nathan Tjoe-A-On	(Wales) Swansea City	End of contract	1 July 2024	
MF	(Netherlands) Pelle van Amersfoort	(Qatar) Al-Shahania SC	€380,000	11 July 2024	
DF	(Netherlands) Sven van Beek	(Qatar) Al-Shahania SC	€120,000	16 July 2024	
FW	(Norway) Osame Sahraoui	(France) Lille OSC	€8,000,000	1 August 2024	

== Friendlies ==
9 July 2024 Friendly	Heerenveen (Netherlands)	4–1	(Netherlands) FC Dordrecht
18:45	Olsson 12'; Braude 26'; Karlsbakk 41' (pen.); Rallis 79'	Report	Receveur 60'

12 July 2024 Friendly	Heerenveen (Netherlands)	1–0	(Netherlands) Almere City
20:00	Karlsbakk 57'	Report

19 July 2024 Friendly	Heerenveen (Netherlands)	5–2	(Netherlands) Zwolle
13:00	Sahraoui 45+27'; Nunnely 73'; Karlsbakk 75'; Al-Saed 81'	Report	Van den Berg 45+17'; Gijselhart 83'

26 July 2024 Friendly	Heerenveen (Netherlands)	5–0	(Spain) Rayo Vallecano
20:00	Sahraoui 17'; Karlsbakk 47', 58', 83' (pen.); Olsson 66'	Report

3 August 2024 Friendly	Middlesbrough (England)	1–0	(Netherlands) Heerenveen
17:00	Burgzorg 90+2' (pen.)	Report

6 January 2025 Friendly	Wehen Wiesbaden (Germany)	1–0	(Netherlands) Heerenveen	Oliva, Spain
12:00	Jacobsen 87'			Stadium: Oliva Nova Sports Center

6 January 2025 Friendly	SC Paderborn (Germany)	1–1	(Netherlands) Heerenveen	Oliva, Spain
14:00	75' (pen.)		Jahanbakhsh 11'	Stadium: Oliva Nova Sports Center

== Competitions ==
=== Overall record ===
Competition	First match	Last match	Starting round	Record							
Competition	First match	Last match	Starting round	Pld	W	D	L	GF	GA	GD	Win %
Eredivisie	11 August 2024	18 May 2025	Matchday 1	34	12	7	15	42	57	−15	35.29
KNVB Cup	29 October 2024	16 January 2025	First Round	3	2	0	1	6	5	+1	66.67
Total				37	14	7	16	48	62	−14	37.84

Source: Competitions

=== Eredivisie ===
==== League table ====
Pos	Team	Pld	W	D	L	GF	GA	GD	Pts	Qualification or relegation
7	Go Ahead Eagles	34	14	9	11	57	55	+2	51	Qualification for the Europa League league phase (Note: Qualified for the Europa League league phase as the 2024–25 KNVB Cup winners.)
8	NEC	34	12	7	15	51	46	+5	43	Qualification for the European competition play-offs
9	Heerenveen	34	12	7	15	42	57	−15	43	Qualification for the European competition play-offs
10	PEC Zwolle	34	10	11	13	43	51	−8	41	
11	Fortuna Sittard	34	11	8	15	37	54	−17	41	

Source: Eredivisie
Rules for classification: 1) Points; 2) Goal difference; 3) Goals scored; 4) Head-to-head points; 5) Head-to-head goal difference; 6) Head-to-head away goals scored; 7) Play-off if relevant for deciding champion, relegation or participating in a European league, otherwise by draw. 8) Penalty shoot-out (only after a play-off)

==== Results by round ====
Round	1	2	3	4	5	6	7	8	9	10	11	12	13	14	15	16	17	18	19	20	21	22	23	24	25	26	27	28	29	30	31	32	33	34
Ground	A	H	H	A	A	H	A	H	A	H	A	H	A	H	A	H	A	A	H	A	H	H	A	H	A	H	A	H	A	H	H	A	A	H
Result	L	D	W	L	L	W	L	D	L	W	L	W	L	D	W	W	L	W	L	L	D	D	D	W	L	D	L	W	L	W	W	L	L	W
Position	13	12	15	10	13	11	15	15	16	12	14	12	12	14	10	10	11	9	10	10	10	9	9	8	9	10	11	8	10	8	8	8	9	9

Updated to match(es) played on 14 May 2025. Source: Eredivisie
A = Away; H = Home; W = Win; D = Draw; L = Loss

==== Matches ====
The league fixtures were announced on 21 June 2024.

==== 1st half ====
11 August 2024 1	Ajax	1–0	Heerenveen	Amsterdam
16:45 CEST (UTC+2)	Hlynsson 45'	Report		Stadium: Johan Cruyff Arena (roof open); Attendance: 54,346; Referee: Bas Nijhuis

17 August 2024 2	Heerenveen	1–1	FC Utrecht	Heerenveen
16:30 CEST (UTC+2)	Trenskow 82'	Report	Romeny 3'	Stadium: Abe Lenstra Stadion; Attendance: 24,000; Referee: Danny Makkelie

31 August 2024 3	Heerenveen	4–0	NAC Breda	Heerenveen
20:00 CEST (UTC+2)	Olsson 47'; Brouwers 50'; Nicolaescu 70', 84'	Report		Stadium: Abe Lenstra Stadion; Attendance: 20,809; Referee: Robin Hensgense

14 September 2024 4	AZ	9–1	Heerenveen	Alkmaar
21:00 CEST (UTC+2)	Mijnans 4'; Parrott 23', 48', 50', 56'; Sadiq 72'; Meerdink 75'; Belik 82'; Buurmeester 85'	Report	Brouwers 19'	Stadium: AFAS Stadion; Attendance: 16,608; Referee: Sander Van Der Eijk

17 September 2024 5	FC Twente	2–0	Heerenveen	Enschede
20:00 CEST (UTC+2)	Steijn 22' (pen.), 39'	Report		Stadium: De Grolsch Veste; Attendance: 29,500; Referee: Serdar Gözübüyük

22 September 2024 6	Heerenveen	2–1	FC Groningen	Heerenveen
12:15 CEST (UTC+2)	Trenskow 12'; Nicolaescu 69'	Report	Valente 9'	Stadium: Abe Lenstra Stadion; Attendance: 23,729; Referee: Dennis Higler

27 September 2024 7	Heracles	2–1	Heerenveen	Almelo
20:00 CEST (UTC+2)	Mirani 25'; Engels 87'	Report	Rallis 59'	Stadium: De Grolsch Veste; Attendance: 11,243; Referee: Erwin Blank

6 October 2024 8	Heerenveen	1–1	PEC Zwolle	Heerenveen
14:30 CEST (UTC+2)	Rallis 10'	Report	Van den Berg 3'	Stadium: Abe Lenstra Stadion; Attendance: 24,141; Referee: Joey Kooij

19 October 2024 9	NEC Nijmegen	3–0	Heerenveen	Nijmegen
20:00 CEST (UTC+2)	Van Crooij 3', 65'; Nuytinck 53'	Report		Stadium: Goffertstadion; Attendance: 12,540; Referee: Marc Nagtegaal

26 October 2024 10	Heerenveen	2–0	Sparta Rotterdam	Heerenveen
21:00 CEST (UTC+2)	Hopland 4'; Trenskow 58'	Report		Stadium: Abe Lenstra Stadion; Attendance: 23,556; Referee: Jannick Van Der Laan

2 November 2024 11	Fortuna Sittard	3–0	Heerenveen	Sittard
21:00 CEST (UTC+2)	Rosier 10', 73'; Peterson 67'	Report		Stadium: Fortuna Sittard Stadion; Attendance: 9,469; Referee: Danny Makkelie

10 November 2024 12	Heerenveen	1–0	Go Ahead Eagles	Heerenveen
14:30 CEST (UTC+2)	Trenskow 36'	Report		Stadium: Abe Lenstra Stadion; Attendance: 24,497; Referee: Serdar Gözübüyük

23 November 2024 13	Feyenoord	3–0	Heerenveen	Rotterdam
18:45 CEST (UTC+2)	Carranza 24'; Hadj Moussa 34'; Paixão 78'	Report		Stadium: Stadion Feijenoord; Attendance: 47,500; Referee: Jeroen Manschot

29 November 2024 14	Heerenveen	1–1	RKC Waalwijk	Heerenveen
20:00 CEST (UTC+2)	Smans 27'	Report	Ihattaren 90+1' (pen.)	Stadium: Abe Lenstra Stadion; Attendance: 22,196; Referee: Edwin Van de Graaf

8 December 2024 15	Willem II	1–2	Heerenveen	Tilburg
14:30 CEST (UTC+2)	Van der Hart 89' (o.g.)	Report	Nicolaescu 85' (pen.); Brouwers 90+3'	Stadium: Koning Willem II Stadion; Attendance: 12,775; Referee: Robin Hensgens

14 December 2024 16	Heerenveen	1–0	PSV	Heerenveen
18:45 CEST (UTC+2)	Nicolaescu 73'	Report		Stadium: Abe Lenstra Stadion; Attendance: 24,680; Referee: Bas Nijhuis

21 December 2024 17	Almere City	3–0	Heerenveen	Almere
18:45 CEST (UTC+2)	Nalic 52'; Jacobs 56'; Balboa 90+2'	Report		Stadium: Yanmar Stadion; Attendance: 3,142; Referee: Martijn Vos

==== 2nd half ====
12 January 2025 18	NAC Breda	2–4	Heerenveen	Breda
16:45 CEST (UTC+2)	Ómarsson 19', 75'	Report	Trenskow 7'; Jahanbakhsh 13'; Hopland 28'; Sebaoui 90+5'	Stadium: Rat Verlegh Stadion; Attendance: 18,095; Referee: Sander Van Der Eijk

19 January 2025 19	Heerenveen	0–2	Ajax	Heerenveen
14:30 CEST (UTC+2)		Report	Sutalo 20'; Akpom 82'	Stadium: Abe Lenstra Stadion; Attendance: 25,248; Referee: Joey Kooij

25 January 2025 20	FC Groningen	1–0	Heerenveen	Groningen
21:00 CEST (UTC+2)	Valente 63'	Report		Stadium: Euroborg; Attendance: 22,525; Referee: Danny Makkelie

1 February 2025 21	Heerenveen	2–2	Fortuna Sittard	Heerenveen
20:00 CEST (UTC+2)	Smans 8'; Gürbüz 82'	Report	Peterson 15' (pen.); Guth 90'	Stadium: Abe Lenstra Stadion; Attendance: 22,273; Referee: Erwin Blank

9 February 2025 22	Heerenveen	3–3	FC Twente	Heerenveen
16:45 CEST (UTC+2)	Lukovic 33'; Van Ee 53'; Gürbüz 90+3'	Report	Rots 3'; Lagerbielke 23'; Van Wolfswinkel 62'	Stadium: Abe Lenstra Stadion; Attendance: 22,785; Referee: Jeroen Manschot

16 February 2025 23	PEC Zwolle	1–1	Heerenveen	Zwolle
14:30 CEST (UTC+2)	Vente 11'	Report	Jahanbakhsh 58'	Stadium: MAC³PARK Stadion; Attendance: 13,749; Referee: Ingmar Oostrom

2 March 2025 24	Heerenveen	3–1	AZ	Heerenveen
12:15 CEST (UTC+2)	Lukovic 5'; Sebaoui 57'; Linday 90+4'	Report	Buurmeester 76'	Stadium: Abe Lenstra Stadion; Attendance: 21,600; Referee: Alex Bos

8 March 2025 25	PSV	2–1	Heerenveen	Eindhoven
20:00 CEST (UTC+2)	Saibari 40'; Til 57'	Report	Smans 72'	Stadium: Philips Stadion; Attendance: 33,800; Referee: Danny Makkelie

15 March 2025 26	Heerenveen	1–1	Heracles	Heerenveen
21:00 CEST (UTC+2)	Linday 44'	Report	Hornkamp 18'	Stadium: Abe Lenstra Stadion; Attendance: 23,088; Referee: Edwin Van de Graaf

30 March 2025 27	FC Utrecht	2–0	Heerenveen	Utrecht
12:15 CEST (UTC+2)	Rodríguez 22'; Hopland 58' (o.g.)	Report		Stadium: Stadion Galgenwaard; Attendance: 22,366; Referee: Jannick Van Der Laan

4 April 2025 28	Heerenveen	3–1	Willem II	Heerenveen
20:00 CEST (UTC+2)	Nicolaescu 11'; Kersten 32'; Sebaoui 66'	Report	Bosch 75'	Stadium: Abe Lenstra Stadion; Attendance: 23,865; Referee: Martin van den Kerkhof

12 April 2025 29	Sparta Rotterdam	3–1	Heerenveen	Rotterdam
18:45 CEST (UTC+2)	Van Bergen 29'; Lauritsen 69' (pen.); Þórisson 84'	Report	Jahanbakhsh 90+4' (pen.)	Stadium: Sparta-Stadion Het Kasteel; Attendance: 10,150; Referee: Sander Van Der Eijk

19 April 2025 31	Heerenveen	2–1	Almere City	Heerenveen
20:00 CEST (UTC+2)	Trenskow 14'; Ritmeester van de Kamp 36' (o.g.)	Report	Kadile 9'	Stadium: Abe Lenstra Stadion; Attendance: 23,012; Referee: Robin Hensgens

27 April 2025 30	Heerenveen	1–0	NEC Nijmegen	Heerenveen
14:30 CEST (UTC+2)	Nicolaescu 53' (pen.)	Report		Stadium: Abe Lenstra Stadion; Attendance: 24,639; Referee: Jannick Van Der Laan

10 May 2025 32	RKC Waalwijk	3–1	Heerenveen	Waalwijk
16:30 CEST (UTC+2)	Margaret 10'; Oukili 75'; Lokesa 79'	Report	Nicolaescu 36' (pen.)	Stadium: Mandemakers Stadion; Attendance: 6,128; Referee: Edwin Van de Graaf

14 May 2025 33	Go Ahead Eagles	1–0	Heerenveen	Deventer
20:00 CEST (UTC+2)	Suray 89'	Report		Stadium: De Adelaarshorst; Referee: Robin Hensgens

18 May 2025 34	Heerenveen	2–0	Feyenoord	Heerenveen
14:30 CEST (UTC+2)	Petrov 4'; Lukovic 29' (pen.)	Report		Stadium: Abe Lenstra Stadion; Attendance: 23,487; Referee: Jeroen Manschot

=== KNVB Cup ===
29 October 2024 First round	IJsselmeervogels	2–3	Heerenveen	Bunschoten
21:00 CEST (UTC+2)	van Gorkom 52'; Beekman 56'	Report	Trenskow 47'; Nicolaescu 76'; Smans 78'	Stadium: Sportpark De Westmaat; Attendance: 5,000; Referee: Robin Hensgens

18 December 2024 Second round	ASWH	0–1	Heerenveen	Hendrik-Ido-Ambacht
20:00 CEST (UTC+2)		Report	Nicolaescu 40'	Stadium: Sportpark Schildman; Attendance: 3,000; Referee: Ingmar Oostrom

16 January 2025 Round of 16	Quick Boys	3–2 (a.e.t.)	Heerenveen	Katwijk
21:00 CEST (UTC+2)	Nwankwo 37'; Zonneveld 88' (pen.); van Duijin 105+4'	Report	Sebaoui 48'; Nicolaescu 76'	Stadium: Sportpark Nieuw Zuid; Attendance: 6,500; Referee: Alex Bos

=== Play-offs ===
22 May 2025 Semi-finals	AZ	4–1	Heerenveen	Alkmaar
18:45 CEST (UTC+2)	Meerdink 3', 21', 45'; Penetra 66'	Report	Nicolaescu 74'	Stadium: AFAS Stadion; Attendance: 12,007; Referee: Marc Nagtegaal

== Statistics ==
=== Scorers ===
#	Player	Eredivisie	KNVB	Play-offs	Total
1	(Moldova) Ion Nicolaescu	8	3	1	12
2	(Denmark) Jacob Trenskow	6	1	0	7
3	(Netherlands) Levi Smans	3	1	0	4
3	(Morocco) Ilias Sebaoui	3	1	0	4
5	(Netherlands) Luuk Brouwers	3	0	0	3
5	(Iran) Alireza Jahanbakhsh	3	0	0	3
5	(Serbia) Milos Lukovic	3	0	0	3
8	(Greece) Dimitris Rallis	2	0	0	2
8	(Norway) Nikolai Hopland	2	0	0	2
8	(Netherlands) Eser Gürbüz	2	0	0	2
8	(Sweden) Marcus Linday	2	0	0	2
12	(Sweden) Simon Olsson	1	0	0	1
12	(Netherlands) Espen Van Ee	1	0	0	1
12	(Netherlands) Sam Kersten	1	0	0	1
12	(Bulgaria) Hristiyan Petrov	1	0	0	1
