= Simon Olsson =

Swedish footballer (born 1997)

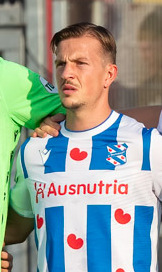
- Olsson with Heerenveen in 2023

Personal information
- Date of birth: 14 September 1997 (age 29)
- Place of birth: Linköping, Sweden
- Height: 1.85 m (6 ft 1 in)
- Position: Attacking midfielder

Team information
- Current team: IF Elfsborg
- Number: 10

Youth career
- IK Östria Lambohov
- 2009–2012: Karle IF
- 2013: AFK Linköping
- 2014–2015: IF Elfsborg

Senior career*
Years	Team	Apps	(Gls)
2013	AFK Linköping	10	(0)
2016–2022	IF Elfsborg	140	(13)
2022–2025	Heerenveen	81	(3)
2025–	IF Elfsborg	32	(0)

International career^{‡}
2014	Sweden U17	2	(0)
2014–2016	Sweden U19	4	(1)
2024	Sweden	3	(0)
- * Club domestic league appearances and goals as of 8 July 2026 ‡ National team caps and goals as of 10:52, 11 June 2024 (UTC)

Simon Olsson (born 14 September 1997) is a Swedish professional footballer who plays as an attacking midfielder for Allsvenskan club Elfsborg.

Olsson started his senior career with local fifth tier side AFK Linköping in 2013, before moving to the youth system of IF Elfsborg in 2014. He made his debut for Elfsborg's senior team in 2016, but his breakthrough came the following season in 2017, where he started 25 matches and registered two goal contributions. He helped Elfsborg secure consecutive European finishes in 2020 and 2021. After making 170 appearances and scoring 13 times for Elfsborg across six years, he left for Eredivisie team Heerenveen in 2022. After two and a half seasons with the Dutch side, he returned to Elfsborg in January 2025.

At the youth international level, Olsson represented the U17 and U19 Swedish national teams, and made his senior team debut in a friendly in 2024.

== Club career ==
=== Early career ===
Born in Linköping, Olsson started with local team IK Östria Lambohov at the age of seven or eight, where his father and older brother also played. He then moved to Karle IF, where he met fellow footballer Mohanad Jeahze. After Karle IF, he joined AFK Linköping in the fifth division, which was a newly formed merger club consisting of his former team IK Östria Lambohov and BK Kenty. He attracted interest from many Swedish teams, and trained with the likes of Jönköpings Södra IF and AIK, but chose to move to the youth team of Allsvenskan side IF Elfsborg in 2014 following a successful trial.

=== Elfsborg ===
==== Youth ====
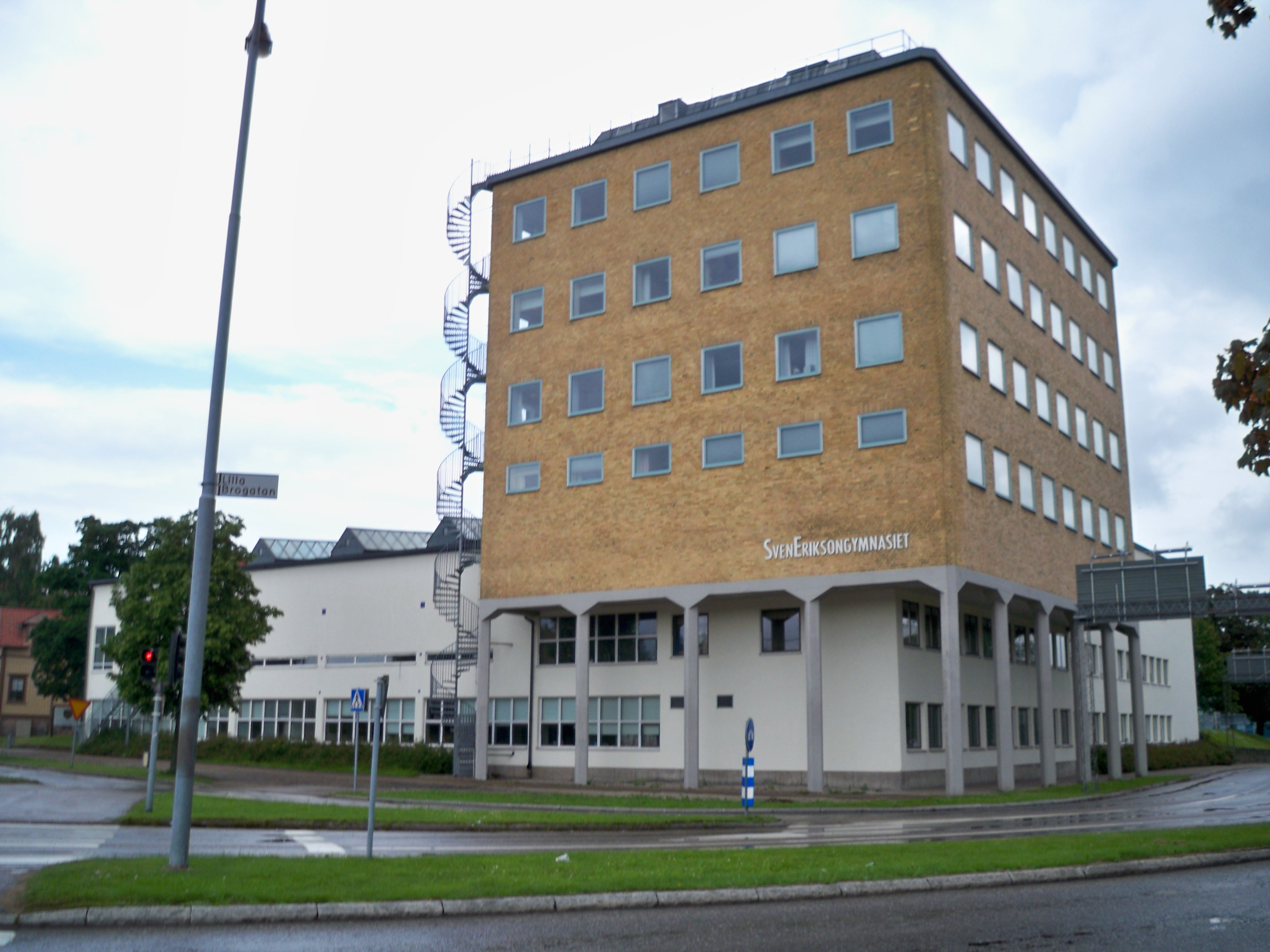
The Sven Eriksonsgymnasiet, which Olsson attended while in Elfsborg's youth system

While playing for Elfsborg's youth team, Olsson attended the Sven Eriksonsgymnasiet and was accommodated at the Gula Kulan student dormitory. He won the 2014 U17 SM with Elfsborg, winning 3–0 in the final against IF Brommapojkarna on 25 October 2014. The team also made progress in the 2015–16 UEFA Youth League, but ultimately lost in the Round of 16 against Real Madrid. He secured an apprenticeship in 2016.

==== 2016–2017: Breakthrough ====
"Simon [Olsson] did very well. He has a fantastic sense of the game. This means that he rarely finds himself short of time. I am very pleased with how he performed. He showed that he is a true Elfsborg player and a player for the future."

— Elfsborg manager Magnus Haglund following Olsson's debut against Falkenbergs FF.

Following his successful stint in the youth team, Olsson made his senior debut in a cup match against IK Gauthiod that finished in a 7–0 victory for Elfsborg, coming on for Simon Lundevall. His Allsvenskan debut came on 18 September 2016, starting in a 5–0 victory against Falkenbergs FF. After two more starts in the Allsvenskan he was promoted permanently to the senior team on 30 September and given a first team contract.

Olsson signed a four-year contract extension in April 2017. His first goal of his career came on 2 June in a 2–0 win over BK Häcken. His performance in a 3–0 victory on 17 July over Hammarby drew praise from teammate Samuel Holmén. He became an important part of the team that season, and was described as one of the most talented players for Elfsborg. However, he sustained a thigh injury in September, which also forced him to withdraw from the national team. Despite the injury, he started 25 matches and contributed to two goals that season. Olsson also won the Elfsborg Breakthrough of the Year.

==== 2018–2019 ====
In January 2018, Elfsborg received a bid from an Italian team for Olsson which was ultimately rejected. Olsson missed the first match of 2018, a cup match against GAIS, due to an illness. He played his first match of the season on 8 April 2018, in a 1–0 loss against Kalmar FF. He was suspended for a match for amassing too many yellow cards over the season on 6 October, in a 4–2 defeat against Sirius. His return from the suspension came on 26 October, in a 2–2 draw against Trelleborgs FF.

Olsson played the full 90 minutes in Elfsborg's first match of 2019 on 17 February, in a 5–1 cup victory against Hässleholms IF. He played in Elfsborg's first league match on 1 April in a 1–1 draw against Hammarby. He was sent off on 12 May in a 4–1 defeat to Malmö FF after receiving two yellow cards in the match. He scored his first goal of the season and the second of his career on 8 July in a 1–1 draw against Helsingborgs IF, which he described as a "dream goal". On 29 July, he assisted Marokhy Ndione in stoppage time to win 2–1 against Kalmar, giving Elfsborg their first win since 15 May.

==== 2020–2022: League success and European campaigns ====
After a preseason which included a tour in the USA, Olsson started the first match of 2020, a 3–0 victory against IK Brage in the cup on 22 February. However, the Allsvenskan Västderby season opener against IFK Göteborg was postponed to 14 June due to the coronavirus pandemic. Olsson started the match, which finished 1–0 to Elfsborg. He scored his first goal of the season on 13 August in a 4–2 win over Falkenbergs. Olsson scored again on 1 November in a 2–1 win against Norrköping, which moved Elfsborg up to second. Elfsborg secured European places after a 1–1 draw against Sirius on 29 November. Olsson scored in a 2–2 draw against AIK on the last matchday on 6 December, securing second place in the league for Elfsborg. Olsson was recognized as one of the best players for Elfsborg in the 2020 season, and won Elfsborg Player of the Year.

Due to his contract expiring in 2021, Olsson began to attract interest from numerous clubs. However, on 12 March, Olsson decided to stay with Elfsborg, extending his contract with the club until 2025. He underwent foot surgery in March, but made his return on 19 April in a 3–1 win against Varberg. However, a fractured heel was discovered in May, and he would not play again until August. He made his return on 8 August, in a 3–0 win over Degerfors IF. On 19 August, he made his European debut in a 5–0 defeat to Feyenoord in the Conference League qualifiers. His first start after the heel injury came on 26 August, in the second leg against Feyenoord, which finished 3–1 to Elfsborg. Elfsborg finished 4th in the 2021 season, once again qualifying them for Europe.

Olsson started the 2022 season with a cup match on 19 February against GIF Sundsvall, which finished 3–2 to Elfsborg. He also started the Allsvenskan premiere on 4 April, which ended in a 2–0 defeat to Mjällby AIF. On 11 April, Olsson drew the first away match 1–1 against Malmö, which Olsson scored the equalizer in, opening his tally for the season. In the Conference League qualifiers, Elfsborg was drawn against Norwegian Molde FK. Olsson started both legs, but ultimately lost 6–2 on aggregate. In the summer of 2022, interest from abroad began to materialize for Olsson. These included Norwegian Rosenborg BK and Dutch sides SC Heerenveen and FC Utrecht. He ended up choosing Heerenveen, one factor being the presence of his former Elfsborg team-mates Rami Kaib and Ibrahim Drešević. By the time of his departure, Olsson had made 170 appearances and scored 13 times for Elfsborg in all competitions across his six seasons for the club.

=== Heerenveen ===
On 2 August 2022, it was announced that Olsson had signed a four-year deal with Heerenveen, and was given the number 19. The transfer fee was reported to be around €1.3 million. He made his debut on 5 August in a 0–0 draw against Sparta Rotterdam, coming on as a substitute for Thom Haye. He started his first match on 10 September, in a 5–0 defeat against Ajax. He made his KNVB Cup debut on 18 October, in a 4–2 win against HSV Hoek. In his first season with Heerenveen, Olsson commonly played down the flank, which he was unhappy with. The club qualified for the European playoffs, with the first leg against FC Twente scheduled for 1 June 2023. Olsson played in both matches but lost 6–1 on aggregate. In his first season, he made 33 league appearances with 27 starts.

"I have clearly stated what I expect from Simon [Olsson] in the 'six' or the 'eight', I just expect more from him. And from that point of view I think Espen delivers more. For me, it is important that, as a midfielder, you make clear decisions in possession and are important for the team. And that you hold your own defensively, Simon still needs to make progress in that area."

— Heerenveen manager Robin van Persie on Olsson's lack of playtime.

Olsson's first goal for Heerenveen came the following season on 16 September 2023, in a 6–1 defeat to Feyenoord. He played more matches in his preferred midfield position in the 2023–24 season. He also became an important part of the team, making the most appearances out of any Heerenveen player with 34.

Olsson helped Heerenveen to their first league win of the 2024–25 season on 31 August 2024, contributing with a goal and an assist in a 4–0 win against NAC Breda. However, with the appointment of Robin van Persie as Heerenveen manager in May 2024, Olsson's starting place was under doubt, with technical manager Ferry de Haan stating, "Olsson, who was really good last season, has been completely out of form for a while now." He was therefore linked with a return to Sweden, with Allsvenskan sides Djurgården and former team Elfsborg each submitting bids for Olsson for the following 2024–25 winter transfer window. By the time of his departure, Olsson had made 89 appearances and scored 3 goals across two-and-a-half seasons with Heerenveen.

=== Return to Elfsborg ===
On 22 January 2025, it was announced that Olsson had returned to Elfsborg. Elfsborg had finished 7th in the league the previous season and were also competing in the Europa League. He signed a four-year contract until 2029, and Olsson was given the shirt number 10. He said of the transfer, "It was an easy choice, absolutely. As I've said before, Elfsborg is my home. It's going to be incredibly fun to get started with the team." His first match since his return to Elfsborg came on 16 February in a 3–1 cup victory against Örgryte IS. He played his first league match since returning on 30 March, in a 2–2 draw to Mjällby.

== International career ==
Olsson made his national team debut for the Sweden U17 on 22 April 2014, in a 3–1 win over Belgium. After making another appearance, in a 2–1 win against Belgium again, he was called to a Sweden U19 camp in Bosön in June. He scored his first international goal with the U19 on 18 September, in a 1–1 draw against Slovakia. He was called up to the Sweden U21 in 2017 but had to withdraw and miss the U21 European Championship qualifiers due to injury.

A few weeks after the passing of his father, in March 2024, Olsson received the news that he was selected for the senior Sweden national team to play in upcoming friendlies. He made his debut for the national team on 21 March 2024 in a friendly against Portugal, which finished 5–2 to Portugal. His first start came in another friendly on 25 March, in a 1–0 win against Albania.

== Style of play ==
Technical manager of Heerenveen Ferry de Haan said of Olsson, "He is a technically skilled, dynamic, and creative midfielder with good stamina, enabling him to regularly appear in the opponent's penalty area." Olsson has said he prefers to play as an attacking midfielder, but can also play as a defensive or central midfielder.

== Career statistics ==
=== Club ===
As of matches played 8 May 2025

Appearances and goals by club, season and competition
Club	Season	League			Cup (Note: Includes Svenska Cupen, KNVB Cup)		Continental		Other		Total	
Club	Season	Division	Apps	Goals	Apps	Goals	Apps	Goals	Apps	Goals	Apps	Goals
AFK Linköping	2012	Division 3 Nordöstra Götaland	10	0	0	0	—		—		10	0
IF Elfsborg	2016	Allsvenskan	4	0	1	0	—		—		5	0
IF Elfsborg	2017	Allsvenskan	25	1	5	0	—		—		30	1
IF Elfsborg	2018	Allsvenskan	22	0	2	0	—		—		24	0
IF Elfsborg	2019	Allsvenskan	26	2	3	0	—		—		29	2
IF Elfsborg	2020	Allsvenskan	29	4	6	0	—		—		35	4
IF Elfsborg	2021	Allsvenskan	19	2	3	0	3 (Note: Appearances in UEFA Europa Conference League)	0	—		25	2
IF Elfsborg	2022	Allsvenskan	15	4	5	0	2	0	—		22	4
IF Elfsborg	Total		140	13	25	0	5	0	—		170	13
Heerenveen	2022–23	Eredivisie	33	0	4	0	—		2 (Note: Appearances in Eredivisie European play-offs)	0	39	0
Heerenveen	2023–24	Eredivisie	34	2	2	0	—		—		36	2
Heerenveen	2024–25	Eredivisie	12	1	2	0	—		—		14	1
Heerenveen	Total		79	3	8	0	—		2	0	89	3
IF Elfsborg	2025	Allsvenskan	13	0	4	0	0	0	0	0	13	0
Career total			242	16	37	0	5	0	2	0	286	16

=== International ===
Appearances and goals by national team and year
National team	Year	Apps	Goals
Sweden	2024	3	0
Total		3	0
