= 2023–24 SC Heerenveen season =

Season of a Dutch football club

SC Heerenveen
2023–24 season
- Chairman: Dennis Gijsman
- Head coach: Kees van Wonderen
- Stadium: Abe Lenstra Stadion
- Eredivisie: 11th
- KNVB Cup: Second round
- Top goalscorer: League: Pelle van Amersfoort (10 goals); All: Pelle van Amersfoort (13 goals)
- Highest home attendance: 24,849 (26th Eredivisie week against Feyenoord)
- Lowest home attendance: 12,000 (KNVB Cup 1st round against VVV-Venlo)
- Average home league attendance: 21,623
- Biggest win: 5–1 (VVV-Venlo, KNVB Cup 1st round)
- Biggest defeat: 0–8 (PSV Eindhoven, 31st Eredivisie week)
Home colours	Away colours

The 2023–24 season was the 104th in the history of SC Heerenveen, and the club's 31st consecutive season in the Eredivisie. In addition to the domestic league, the club also competed in the KNVB Cup.

Heerenveen lost 1–0 against Vitesse in the second round of the KNVB Cup and were eliminated from the competition. Heerenveen finished the league in 11th place.

Pelle van Amersfoort was the top scorer of the club for the season, with ten goals in the Eredivisie and three goals in the KNVB Cup.

Simon Olsson made the most appearances with 36 across the season: 34 appearances in the Eredivisie and two appearances in the KNVB Cup.

Oliver Braude and Thom Haye were the most booked players of the club during the season, with four yellow cards and one red card each.

== Players ==
=== First-team squad ===
As of 5 February 2024

Note: Flags indicate national team as defined under FIFA eligibility rules; some limited exceptions apply. Players may hold more than one non-FIFA nationality.

No.	Pos.	Nation	Player
2	DF	NED	Denzel Hall
4	DF	NED	Sven van Beek
5	DF	POL	Paweł Bochniewicz
6	DF	NED	Syb van Ottele
7	FW	GER	Mats Köhlert
8	FW	SWE	Alex Timossi Andersson
9	FW	NOR	Daniel Karlsbakk
10	FW	CYP	Loizos Loizou
11	MF	NED	Pelle van Amersfoort
13	GK	NED	Mickey van der Hart
14	MF	ENG	Charlie Webster
15	DF	IRQ	Hussein Ali
16	GK	NED	Bernt Klaverboer
17	FW	NED	Ché Nunnely
18	FW	MDA	Ion Nicolaescu

No.	Pos.	Nation	Player
19	MF	SWE	Simon Olsson
20	FW	NOR	Osame Sahraoui
21	MF	NED	Djenahro Nunumete
23	GK	NED	Jan Bekkema
24	FW	SWE	Patrik Wålemark
25	DF	IDN	Nathan Tjoe-A-On
26	MF	MAR	Anas Tahiri
27	DF	NED	Milan van Ewijk
28	MF	NED	Luuk Brouwers
33	MF	IDN	Thom Haye
38	MF	NED	Melle Witteveen
40	MF	NED	Espen van Ee
42	DF	NED	Roan Van Der Plaat
44	GK	NED	Andries Noppert

== Transfers ==
=== In ===
Date	Position	Player	Transferred from	Fee
30 Juni 2023	MF	(England) Charlie Webster (Note: Loaned from Chelsea F.C.)	(England) Chelsea F.C.	
1 July 2023	DF	(Netherlands) David Easmon	(Netherlands) AFC Ajax	
31 July 2023	DF	(Netherlands) Denzel Hall (Note: He was on loan at ADO Den Haag, transferred to SC Heerenveen.)	(Netherlands) Feyenoord	
1 July 2023		(Netherlands) Espen van Ee	(Netherlands) Feyenoord	
1 July 2023		(Morocco) Ilyas el Moussaoui	(Netherlands) Feyenoord	
7 August 2023	FW	(Moldova) Ion Nicolaescu	(Israel) Beitar Jerusalem F.C.	€1,200,000
21 August 2023	MF	(Netherlands) Luuk Brouwers (Note: Loaned from FC Utrecht)	(Netherlands) FC Utrecht	
23 August 2023	GK	(Netherlands) Mickey van der Hart	(Netherlands) FC Emmen	
25 January 2024	DF	(Netherlands) Nathan Tjoe-A-On (Note: Loaned from Swansea City)	(England) Swansea City A.F.C.	
30 January 2024	FW	(Cyprus) Loizos Loizou	(Cyprus) AC Omonia	
2024	FW	(Netherlands) Amir Ismaïl	(Netherlands) Heerenveen U21	
	FW	(Sweden) Patrik Wålemark (Note: Loaned from Feyenoord)	(Netherlands) Feyenoord	

=== Out ===
Date	Position	Player	Transferred to	Fee
31 August 2023	FW	(Sweden) Alex Timossi Andersson	(Sweden) IF Brommapojkarna	
23 June 2023	FW	(Belgium) Antoine Colassin (Note: He was on loan by SC Heerenveen, returned to Anderlecht)	(Belgium) R.S.C. Anderlecht	
1 July 2023	DF	(Netherlands) Finn van den Berg	(United States) NMU	Free transfer
17 July 2023	DF	(Netherlands) Jeffrey Bruma	(Netherlands) RKC Waalwijk	Free transfer
17 July 2023	DF	(Netherlands) Joost van Aken	—N/a	—N/a
27 July 2023	DF	(Netherlands) Milan van Ewijk	(England) Coventry City F.C.	€4,300,000
14 June 2023	MF	(Sweden) Rami Al Hajj	(Denmark) Odense Boldklub	Free transfer
30 July 2023	DF	(Tunisia) Rami Kaib	(Sweden) Djurgårdens IF Fotboll	
1 Augustus 2023	FW	(Norway) Rasmus Christiansen	(Norway) Kongsvinger IL Toppfotball	Free transfer
30 June 2023	FW	(Netherlands) Sydney van Hooijdonk (Note: He was on loan by SC Heerenveen, returned to Bologna)	(Italy) Bologna	
4 September 2023	MF	(Croatia) Tibor Halilović	(Croatia) GNK Dinamo Zagreb	
14 July 2023	MF	(Netherlands) Timo Zaal	(Netherlands) Feyenoord	
4 September 2023	MF	(Croatia) Tibor Halilović	(Croatia) GNK Dinamo Zagreb	
	GK	(Netherlands) Xavier Mous		Free transfer

== Pre-season and friendlies ==
3 Juli 2023	FC Wolvega	0–14	SC Heerenveen	Wolvega

6 Juli 2023	Gaasterlân-Sleat	0–11	SC Heerenveen

9 Juli 2023	SC Heerenveen	6–0	Kickers Emden	Heerenveen
				Stadium: Abe Lenstra Stadion

12 Juli 2023	SC Heerenveen	0–2	K.V.C. Westerlo	Heerenveen
				Stadium: Abe Lenstra Stadion

20 Juli 2023	SC Heerenveen	2–0	OFI	Heerenveen
				Stadium: Abe Lenstra Stadion

5 August 2023	SC Heerenveen	0–1	FC Metz

6 January 2024 Friendly	SC Heerenveen	2–4	Almere City FC	Tegelen
13:30 UTC+1	Olsson 88' van Amersfoort 90'	Report	van La Parra 17'; Kromah 45+2', 45+7'; Pinas 80'	Stadium: Sportpark de Bakenbos; Attendance: 0

== Competitions ==
=== Eredivisie ===
==== League table ====
Pos	Team	Pld	W	D	L	GF	GA	GD	Pts	Qualification or relegation
9	Go Ahead Eagles (O)	34	12	10	12	47	46	+1	46	Qualification for the European competition play-offs
10	Fortuna Sittard	34	9	11	14	37	56	−19	38	
11	Heerenveen	34	10	7	17	53	70	−17	37	
12	PEC Zwolle	34	9	9	16	45	67	−22	36	
13	Almere City	34	7	13	14	33	59	−26	34	

Source: Eredivisie
Rules for classification: Season in progress: 1) Most points won; 2) Less points lost; 3) Goal difference; 4) Goals scored; 5) Alphabetical order; End of season: 1) Points; 2) Goal difference; 3) Goals scored; 4) Head-to-head points; 5) Head-to-head goal difference; 6) Head-to-head away goals scored; 7) Play-off if relevant for deciding champion, relegation or participating in a European league, otherwise by draw. 8) Penalty shoot-out (only after a play-off)
(O) Play-off winners

==== Results by round ====
Round	1	2	3	4	5	6	7	8	9	10	11	12	13	14	15	16	17	18	19	20	21	22	23	24	25	26	27	28	29	30	31	32	33	34
Ground	H	A	H	A	A	H	A	H	A	H	A	A	H	H	A	H	A	A	H	A	H	H	A	H	A	H	A	H	H	A	H	A	H	A
Result	W	W	L	L	L	L	L	D	L	W	L	W	W	W	L	L	D	L	D	D	W	L	W	W	L	L	D	D	L	W	L	D	L	L
Position				6	11		14	13	15	10	13	10	7	7	8	9	9		12	13	11	12	10	9	9	11	11	11	11	10	10	10	10	11

Updated to match(es) played on 20 May 2024. Source: ESPN
A = Away; H = Home; W = Win; D = Draw; L = Loss

==== 1st half ====
12 August 2023 1st week	SC Heerenveen	3–1	RKC Waalwijk	Heerenveen
18:45	Ion Nicolaescu 24'; Paweł Bochniewicz 30'; Osame Sahraoui 43'	Report	Michiel Kramer 60' (pen.)	Stadium: Abe Lenstra Stadion; Attendance: 19,500; Referee: Marc Nagtegaal

20 August 2023 2nd week	FC Utrecht	0–2	SC Heerenveen	Utrecht
12:15		Report	Osame Sahraoui 43'; Daniel Karlsbakk 90+1'	Stadium: Stadion Galgenwaard; Attendance: 19,878; Referee: Ingmar Oostrom

27 August 2023 3rd week	SC Heerenveen	1–3	Sparta Rotterdam	Heerenveen
16:45	Paweł Bochniewicz 71'	Report	Tobias Lauritsen 34'; Koki Saito 53' 62'	Stadium: Abe Lenstra Stadion; Attendance: 19,700; Referee: Allard Lindhout

2 September 2023 4th week	Go Ahead Eagles	3–2	SC Heerenveen	Deventer
18:45	Bas Kuipers 22'; Philippe Rommens 39' (pen.); Sylla Sow 66'	Report	Charlie Webster 45+2'; Osame Sahraoui 87'	Stadium: De Adelaarshorst; Attendance: 9,723; Referee: Jannick van der Laan

16 September 2023 5th week	Feyenoord	6–1	SC Heerenveen	Rotterdam
16:30	Luka Ivanušec 12'; Mats Wieffer 16'; Igor Paixão 20'; Santiago Giménez 60'; Yankuba Minteh 66'; Ondřej Lingr 72'	Report	Simon Olsson 25'	Stadium: De Kuip; Attendance: 47,500; Referee: Jeroen Manschot

23 September 2023 6th week	SC Heerenveen	0–3	Excelsior Rotterdam	Heerenveen
21:00		Report	Couhaib Driouech 21'; Nikolas Agrafiotis 45+2'; Troy Parrott 88'	Stadium: Abe Lenstra Stadion; Attendance: 19,630; Referee: Erwin Blank

30 September 2023 7th week	FC Twente	1–0	SC Heerenveen	Enschede
21:00	Michel Vlap 65'	Report		Stadium: De Grolsch Veste; Attendance: 29,500; Referee: Rob Dieperink

7 October 2023 8th week	SC Heerenveen	1–1	NEC Nijmegen	Heerenveen
16:30	Patrik Wålemark 6'	Report	Bas Dost 45+1'	Stadium: Abe Lenstra Stadion; Attendance: 20,600; Referee: Marc Nagtegaal

21 October 2023 9th week	AZ Alkmaar	3–0	SC Heerenveen	Alkmaar
21:00	Vangelis Pavlidis 11', 59', 76'	Report		Stadium: AFAS Stadion; Attendance: 17,421; Referee: Jochem Kamphuis

28 October 2023 10th week	SC Heerenveen	3–0	Heracles Almelo	Heerenveen
18:45	Osame Sahraoui 10'; Luuk Brouwers 21', 72'	Report		Stadium: Abe Lenstra Stadion; Attendance: 21,700; Referee: Martin van den Kerkhof

5 November 2023 11th week	AFC Ajax	4–1	SC Heerenveen	Amsterdam
16:45	Steven Bergwijn 25'; Brian Brobbey 42'; Chuba Akpom 84', 90+2'	Report	Luuk Brouwers 45+1'	Stadium: Johan Cruyff Arena; Attendance: 54,288; Referee: Sander van der Eijk

11 November 2023 12th week	SBV Vitesse	1–3	SC Heerenveen	Arnhem
21:00	Million Manhoef 4'	Report	Pelle van Amersfoort 25'; Anas Tahiri 78' (pen.); Ion Nicolaescu 85'	Stadium: GelreDome; Attendance: 14,973; Referee: Edwin van de Graaf

25 November 2023 13th week	SC Heerenveen	3–0	Fortuna Sittard	Heerenveen
18:45	Thom Haye 45+4' (pen.), 62' (pen.); Ion Nicolaescu 88'	Report		Stadium: Abe Lenstra Stadion; Attendance: 21,000; Referee: Jeroen Manschot

1 December 2023 14th week	SC Heerenveen	3–0	Almere City FC	Heerenveen
20:00 CET (UTC+1)	Pelle van Amersfoort 15', 70'; Sven van Beek 39'	Report		Stadium: Abe Lenstra Stadion; Attendance: 20,555; Referee: Richard Martens

7 December 2023 15th week	PSV Eindhoven	2–0	SC Heerenveen	Eindhoven
18:45	Guus Til 33'; Ricardo Pepi 78'	Report		Stadium: Philips Stadion; Attendance: 34,000; Referee: Bas Nijhuis

16 December 2023 16th week	SC Heerenveen	1–2	FC Volendam	Heerenveen
21:00	Ion Nicolaescu 65'	Report	Bilal Ould-Chikh 28'; Lequincio Zeefuik 51'	Stadium: Abe Lenstra Stadion; Attendance: 21,800; Referee: Allard Lindhout

==== 2nd half ====
13 January 2024 17th week	PEC Zwolle	2–2	SC Heerenveen	Zwolle
20:00	Anas Tahiri 7' (pen.); Ché Nunnely 90+1'	Report	Younes Namli 64'; Lennart Thy 73'	Stadium: MAC³PARK Stadion; Attendance: 14,000; Referee: Danny Makkelie

19 January 2024 18th week	Excelsior Rotterdam	3–0	SC Heerenveen	Rotterdam
20:00	Couhaib Driouech 18'; Troy Parrott 24'; Lazaros Lamprou 63'	Report		Stadium: Stadion Woudestein; Attendance: 4,400; Referee: Edwin Van de Graaf

28 January 2024 19th week	SC Heerenveen	2–2	AZ Alkmaar	Heerenveen
12:15	Jordy Clasie 24' (o.g.); Luuk Brouwers 51'	Report	Vangelis Pavlidis 19'; Pawel Bochniewicz 88' (o.g.)	Stadium: Abe Lenstra Stadion; Attendance: 20,202; Referee: Sander Van Der Eijk

3 February 2024 20th week	Fortuna Sittard	3–3	SC Heerenveen	Sittard
18:45	Alen Halilović 60', 80' (pen.); Rodrigo Guth 63'	Report	Osame Sahraoui 19'; Luuk Brouwers 24', 72'	Stadium: Fortuna Sittard Stadion; Attendance: 9,915; Referee: Jannick Van Der Laan

11 February 2024 21st week	SC Heerenveen	3–2	AFC Ajax	Heerenveen
14:30	Pelle van Amersfoort 24', 46'; Osame Sahraoui 38'	Report	Pawel Bochniewicz 51' (o.g.); Chuba Akpom 79'	Stadium: Abe Lenstra Stadion; Attendance: 24,150; Referee: Danny Makkelie

17 February 2024 22nd week	SC Heerenveen	0–2	Go Ahead Eagles	Heerenveen
21:00		Report	Jakob Breum 56'; Victor Edvardsen 90+2'	Stadium: Abe Lenstra Stadion; Attendance: 22,020; Referee: Erwin Blank

25 February 2024 23rd week	FC Volendam	0–4	SC Heerenveen	Volendam
20:00		Report	Pelle van Amersfoort 13', 68'; Simon Olsson 66'; Thom Haye 90'	Stadium: Kras Stadion; Attendance: 6,647; Referee: Rob Dieperink

3 March 2024 24th week	SC Heerenveen	2–0	PEC Zwolle	Heerenveen
14:30	Anas Tahiri 45+2' (pen.); Pelle van Amersfoort 67'	Report		Stadium: Abe Lenstra Stadion; Attendance: 22,849; Referee: Robin Hensgens

10 March 2024 25th week	NEC Nijmegen	2–0	SC Heerenveen	Nijmegen
16:45	Koki Ogawa 67'; Roberto González 68'	Report		Stadium: Goffertstadion; Attendance: 12,500; Referee: Joey Kooij

17 March 2024 26th week	SC Heerenveen	2–3	Feyenoord	Heerenveen
14:30	Mats Köhlert 17', 64'	Report	Mats Wieffer 37'; Igor Paixão 74'; Ayase Ueda 88'	Stadium: Abe Lenstra Stadion; Attendance: 24,849; Referee: Dennis Higler

30 March 2024 27th week	RKC Waalwijk	1–1	SC Heerenveen	Waalwijk
20:00	Kevin Felida 69'	Report	Pelle van Amersfoort 52'	Stadium: Mandemakers Stadion; Attendance: 6,733; Referee: Erwin Blank

3 April 2024 28th week	SC Heerenveen	3–3	FC Twente	Heerenveen
21:00	Ion Nicolaescu 21'; Osame Sahraoui 38'; Thom Haye 57' (pen.)	Report	Ricky van Wolfswinkel 11'; Daan Rots 13'; Robin Pröpper 36'	Stadium: Abe Lenstra Stadion; Attendance: 20,954; Referee: Alex Bos

7 April 2024 29th week	SC Heerenveen	2–3	FC Utrecht	Heerenveen
20:00	Patrik Wålemark 90', 90+4'	Report	Isac Lidberg 37'; Sam Lammers 48', 83'	Stadium: Abe Lenstra Stadion; Attendance: 20,417; Referee: Jeroen Manschot

14 April 2024 30th week	Heracles Almelo	0–2	SC Heerenveen	Almelo
12:15		Report	Ché Nunnely 9'; Pelle van Amersfoort 88'	Stadium: Erve Asito; Attendance: 12,080; Referee: Rob Dieperink

25 April 2024 31st week	SC Heerenveen	0–8	PSV Eindhoven	Heerenveen
18:45		Report	Guus Til 37', 30'; Malik Tillman 9', 11'; Joey Veerman 44'; Johan Bakayoko 52'; Luuk de Jong 71'; Patrick van Aanholt 83'	Stadium: Abe Lenstra Stadion; Attendance: 24,500; Referee: Danny Makkelie

3 May 2024 32nd week	Almere City FC	1–1	SC Heerenveen	Almere
20:00	Kornelius Normann Hansen 47'	Report	Osame Sahraoui 80'	Stadium: Yanmar Stadion; Attendance: 4,222; Referee: Martijn Vos

12 May 2024 33rd week	SC Heerenveen	1–3	SBV Vitesse	Heerenveen
14:30	Anas Tahiri 8' (pen.)	Report	Marco van Ginkel 23', 58' (pen.); Thomas Buitink 90+2'	Stadium: Abe Lenstra Stadion; Attendance: 23,720; Referee: Richard Martens

19 May 2024 34th week	Sparta Rotterdam	2–1	SC Heerenveen	Rotterdam
14:30	Camiel Neghli 57'; Tobias Lauritsen 73'	Report	Paweł Bochniewicz 90+1'	Stadium: Het Kasteel; Attendance: 10,272; Referee: Sander Van Der Eijk

=== KNVB Cup ===
31 October 2023 KNVB Beker 1st round	SC Heerenveen	5–1	VVV-Venlo	Heerenveen
20:00	Pelle van Amersfoort 21', 40', 44'; Espen van Ee 68'; Daniel Karlsbakk 90'	Report	Soulyman Allouch 76'	Stadium: Abe Lenstra Stadion; Attendance: 12,000; Referee: Ingmar Oostrom

21 December 2023 KNVB Beker 2nd round	SBV Vitesse	1–0	SC Heerenveen	Arnhem
20:00	Amine Boutrah 86'	Report		Stadium: GelreDome; Attendance: 11,913; Referee: Rob Dieperink

== Statistics ==
=== Scorers ===
#	Player	Eredivisie	KNVB	Total
1	(Netherlands) Pelle van Amersfoort	10	3	13
2	(Norway) Osame Sahraoui	8	0	8
3	(Netherlands) Luuk Brouwers	6	0	6
4	(Moldova) Ion Nicolaescu	5	0	5
5	(Morocco) Anas Tahiri	4	0	4
5	(Netherlands) Thom Haye	4	0	4
7	(Sweden) Patrik Wålemark	3	0	3
7	(Poland) Paweł Bochniewicz	3	0	3
9	(Netherlands) Ché Nunnely	2	0	2
9	(Norway) Daniel Karlsbakk	1	1	2
9	(Germany) Mats Köhlert	2	0	2
9	(Sweden) Simon Olsson	2	0	2
13	(England) Charlie Webster	1	0	1
13	(Netherlands) Espen van Ee	0	1	1
13	(Netherlands) Sven van Beek	1	0	1

=== Appearances ===
#	Player	Eredivisie	KNVB	Total
1	(Sweden) Simon Olsson	34	2	36
2	(Germany) Mats Köhlert	33	2	35
3	(Netherlands) Ché Nunnely	32	2	34
3	(Netherlands) Thom Haye	32	2	34
5	(Norway) Osame Sahraoui	32	1	33
5	(Netherlands) Pelle van Amersfoort	31	2	33
7	(Netherlands) Sven van Beek	30	2	32
8	(Poland) Paweł Bochniewicz	29	2	31
9	(Norway) Oliver Braude	28	1	29
10	(Netherlands) Luuk Brouwers	26	2	28
10	(Netherlands) Syb van Ottele	26	2	28
12	(Morocco) Anas Tahiri	24	1	25
12	(Sweden) Patrik Wålemark	24	1	25
14	(Netherlands) Andries Noppert	22	0	22
15	(Moldova) Ion Nicolaescu	19	1	20
16	(Netherlands) Espen van Ee	18	1	19
17	(Norway) Daniel Karlsbakk	16	1	17
18	(Iraq) Hussein Ali	15	1	16
19	(Netherlands) Mickey van der Hart	12	2	14
20	(England) Charlie Webster	13	0	13
21	(Netherlands) Denzel Hall	11	0	11
22	(Netherlands) Melle Witteveen	5	1	6
23	(Cyprus) Loizos Loizou	5	0	5
24	(Netherlands) Djenahro Nunumete	3	1	4
24	(Netherlands) Nathan Tjoe-A-On	4	0	4
26	(Netherlands) Amir Ismail	1	0	1

=== Clean sheets ===
#	Player	Eredivisie	KNVB	Total
1	(Netherlands) Andries Noppert	4	0	4
2	(Netherlands) Mickey van der Hart	3	0	3
Total		7	0	7

=== Disciplinary record ===
#	Player	Eredivisie			KNVB			Total		
#	Player	Booked	(yellow card) (yellow-red card)	Sent off (straight red)	Booked	(yellow card) (yellow-red card)	Sent off (straight red)	Booked	(yellow card) (yellow-red card)	Sent off (straight red)
1	(Norway) Oliver Braude	4	1	0	0	0	0	4	1	0
1	(Netherlands) Thom Haye	4	0	1	0	0	0	4	0	1
3	(England) Charlie Webster	0	0	1	0	0	0	0	0	1
3	(Netherlands) Espen van Ee	0	0	1	0	0	0	0	0	1
5	(Germany) Mats Köhlert	5	0	0	0	0	0	5	0	0
6	(Netherlands) Luuk Brouwers	4	0	0	0	0	0	4	0	0
6	(Sweden) Simon Olsson	4	0	0	0	0	0	4	0	0
8	(Poland) Paweł Bochniewicz	2	0	0	1	0	0	3	0	0
8	(Netherlands) Pelle van Amersfoort	3	0	0	0	0	0	3	0	0
8	(Netherlands) Sven van Beek	3	0	0	0	0	0	3	0	0
11	(Morocco) Anas Tahiri	2	0	0	0	0	0	2	0	0
11	(Sweden) Patrik Wålemark	2	0	0	0	0	0	2	0	0
13	(Netherlands) Denzel Hall	1	0	0	0	0	0	1	0	0
13	(Moldova) Ion Nicolaescu	1	0	0	0	0	0	1	0	0
13	(Netherlands) Mickey van der Hart	1	0	0	0	0	0	1	0	0
13	(Netherlands) Syb van Ottele	1	0	0	0	0	0	1	0	0
