= Football rivalries in Sweden =

There are several derbies and rivalries in the top-tier league Allsvenskan and in lower divisions of the Swedish football league system.

== Background ==
During the 1900s, city league play commenced in Stockholm and Gothenburg, followed by other city and inter-city leagues in Gävle, Linköping–Norrköping, Eskilstuna, Uppsala, Söderhamn, Örebro and Västerås–Köping, where the Stockholm and Gothenburg leagues evolved into several tiers. More nationwide league play commenced in 1910, when Svenska Serien was introduced in the 1910 season.

The word derby has been used in the Swedish language to describe a match between teams from the same area since 1927.

== City derbies ==
=== Stockholm ===
Matches in between AIK, Djurgården, and Hammarby Fotboll are played daytime during weekends.

Four clubs, AIK, Brommapojkarna, Djurgården, and Hammarby, have decided to not engage in transfers of each other's youth players.

==== AIK vs Djurgården ====
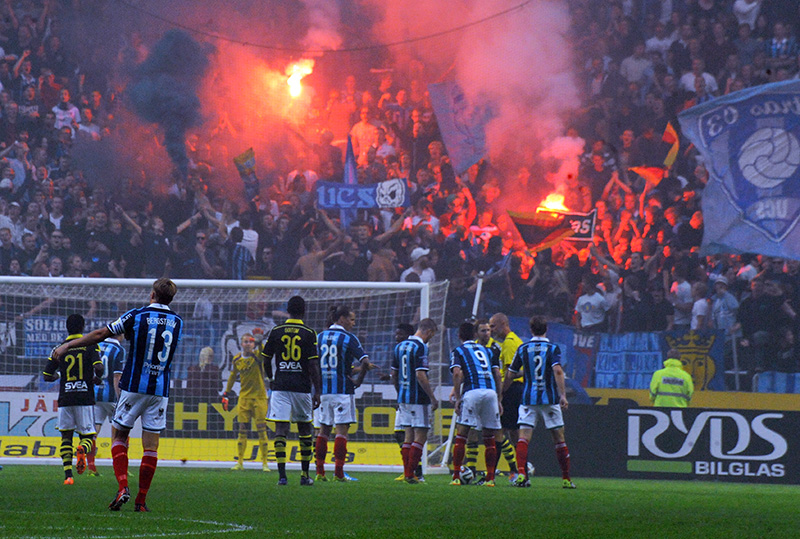
Tvillingderbyt in the 2014 Allsvenskan season

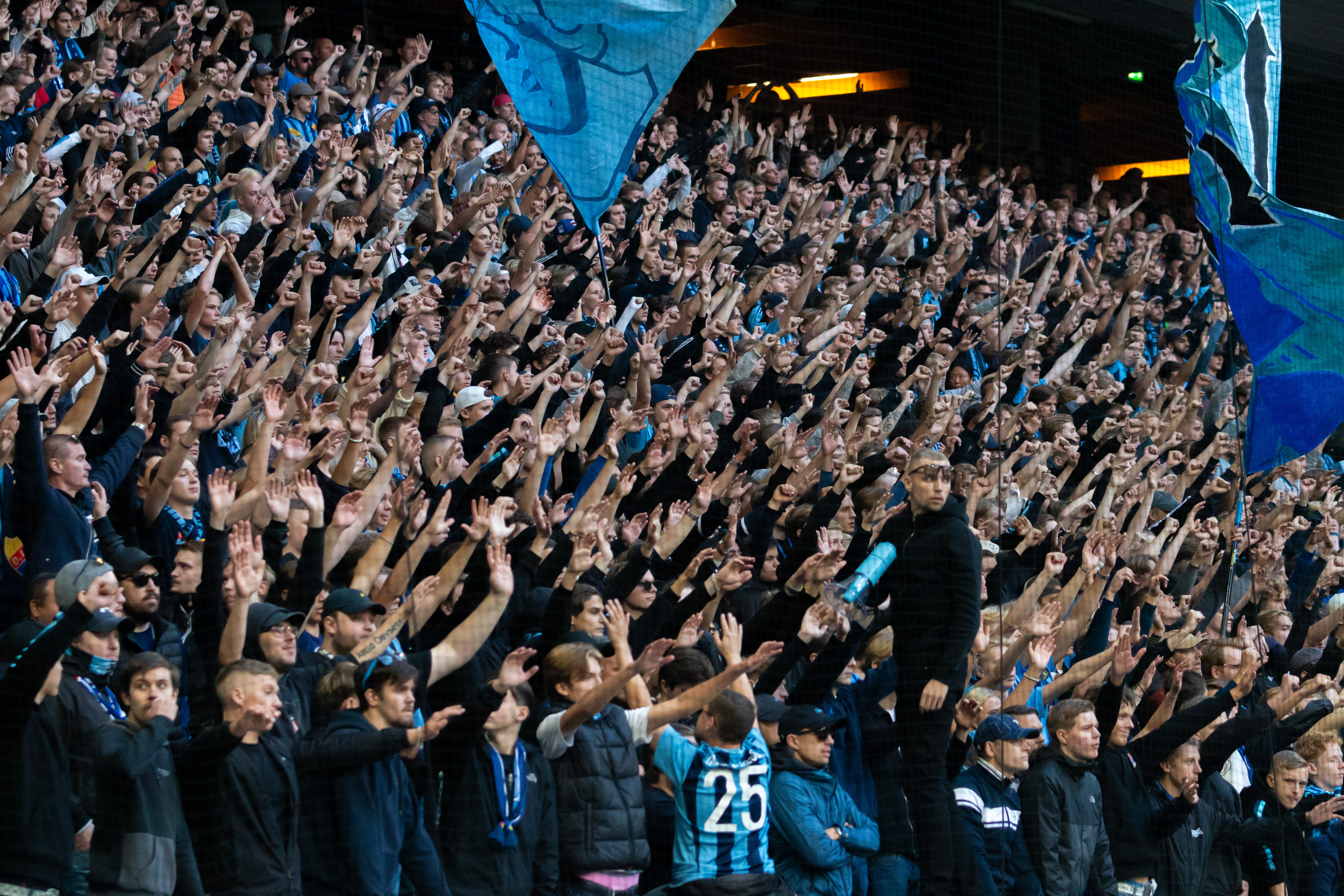
Djurgården supporters at Friends Arena in 2023

The Stockholm sports clubs Allmänna Idrottsklubben and Djurgårdens Idrottsförening were both founded in 1891 as general sports clubs. The match between the football teams, AIK and Djurgården, is the most classic derby in Stockholm and is considered the fiercest rivalry in Scandinavia. In the 1910s, the two clubs had already established themselves as the two clubs with the largest following in Stockholm. The clubs are historically Stockholm's biggest and most successful clubs with AIK having won a total of 12 Swedish championship titles and Djurgården also 12. The rivalry has existed since 1891, the year both clubs were founded, separated by just three weeks. Thereby known as Tvillingderbyt (lit. 'the Twin Derby'), matches between the two clubs are sometimes listed in the European top ten of hottest derbies. Since 1891, 220 fixtures have been contested in all competitions with both clubs winning 80 games each. Historically AIK has been the most victorious between the two of all fixtures.

Djurgården consider the affluent Östermalm district, the eastern part of Stockholm City Centre, their traditional heartland although most Djurgården member. AIK has a strong concentration of fans in the northwest, roughly along the blue line of the Metro.

AIK supporters are nicknamed gnagare (lit. 'rodents'), while the Djurgården supporters are called järnkaminer (lit. 'iron stoves'). Although Djurgården supporters also have a derogatory nickname, namely apor (lit. 'monkeys') used by their rivals due to their name Djurgården deriving from the island in Stockholm that now inhabits the famous Skansen. AIK supporters also have many derogatory nicknames, mainly råttor (lit. 'rats').

When Jesper Jansson left AIK for Djurgården before the 1996 season, he was threatened and the door of his apartment was vandalised by Firman Boys, a group connected to AIK. When former AIK player Anders Limpar signed for Djurgården in 2000, his restaurant in Stockholm was vandalised by the same group.

An attendance of 45,367 people watched a 2019 match, breaking an earlier record from 1975.

==== AIK vs Hammarby ====
AIK vs Hammarby is arguably the least tense Stockholm derby. In 2015, two of the three games between these two teams had an attendance of 41,063 and 41,630 respectively. Hammarby consider Södermalm, the southern district of Stockholm City Centre where the club was founded, and the boroughs south of said district, their heartland. AIK have a strong concentration of fans in the north, west and centre of the city, roughly along the blue line of the Metro.

==== Djurgården vs Hammarby ====
The derby Djurgården vs Hammarby is considered less significant than the AIK–Djurgården rivalry but equally or possibly even more intense than the AIK–Hammarby rivalry. This fiercely contended football rivalry traces its origin back to the later half of the 1910s but did not reach relevance until the 1950s and 1960s when Hammarby established themselves as a top-flight outfit. Hammarby consider Södermalm, the southern district of Stockholm City Centre where the club was founded, as well as the boroughs just south of said district, their heartland. Djurgården counts Östermalm, the district that forms the eastern part of the city centre, and where their former home ground, the Olympic Stadium is situated, as their stronghold. Hammarby has since 1946 predominantly played in the Johanneshov district, just south of Södermalm.

In 2013, both teams moved into the newly constructed Tele2 Arena located in Johanneshov, which has increased tensions significantly between Djurgården and Hammarby fans. The fixture has been called El Plástico by supporters of other teams as the Tele2 Arena is equipped with artificial turf.

==== Brommapojkarna ====
Brommapojkarna is not considered a rival by the other Stockholm teams, despite having frequented the top league table in later years. They are a small team with a very low attendance and rarely stay for long before they get relegated. They are most known for their successful academy, which is the biggest in Sweden. Brommapojkarna is native to Bromma and play on Grimsta IP, with some derbies played in Tele2 Arena.

=== Gothenburg ===
==== IFK Göteborg vs Örgryte ====
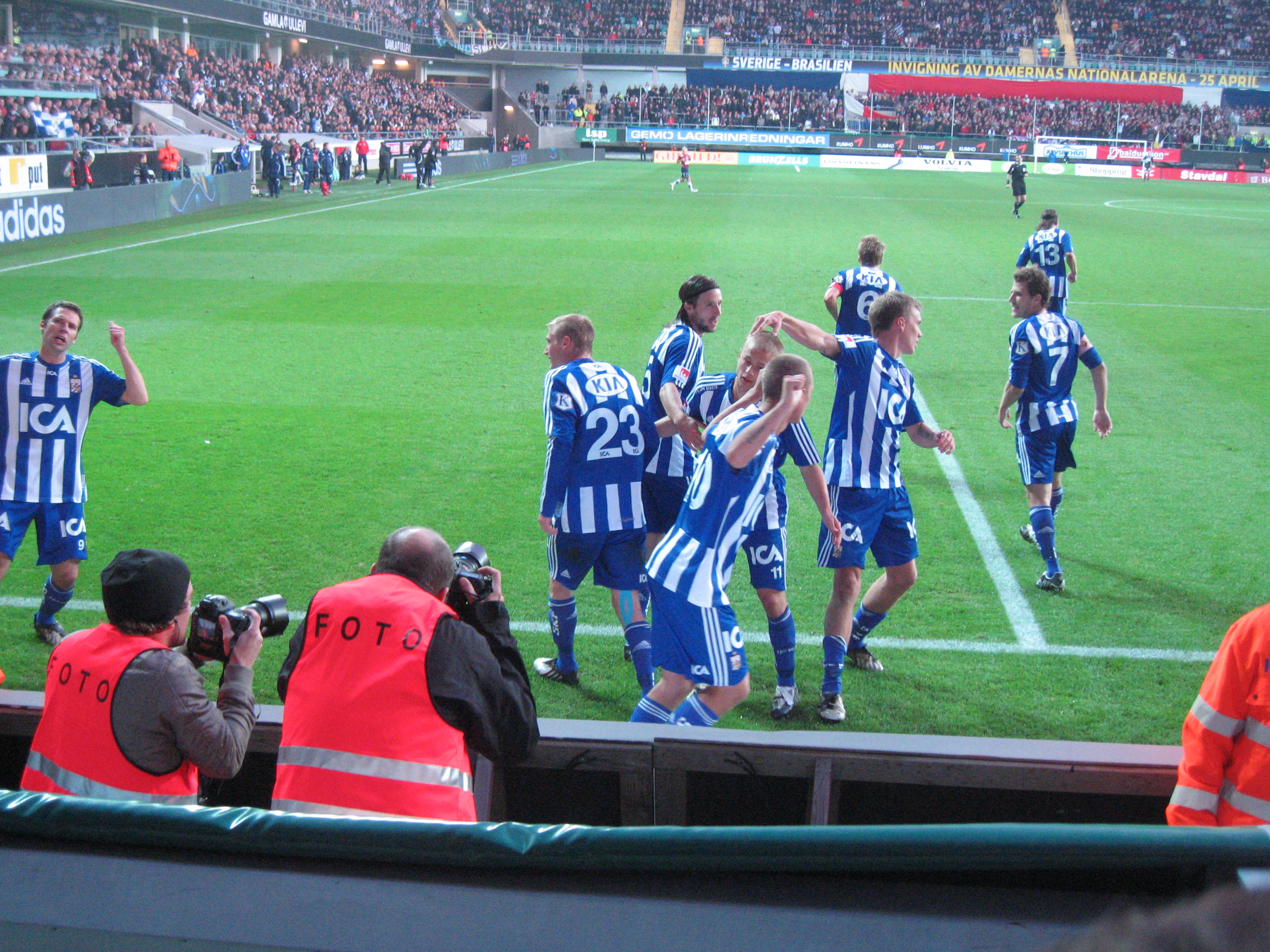
IFK Göteborg players celebrate a goal against Örgryte in the 2009 Allsvenskan

The rivalry between IFK Göteborg and Örgryte IS is traditionally the main rivalry in Gothenburg, contested between the city's most successful sides. Before the foundation of IFK Göteborg, the dominant club in the Gothenburg area was Örgryte, then considered a middle class club and in later years an upper class club. IFK became popular among the working class, creating a fierce rivalry based upon both local pride and social class. In the early 20th century, supporters were supposed to act as gentlemen, applauding and supporting both their own team, and the opponents. However, this proved a hard task for supporters of the Gothenburg teams. Local patriotism and class differences sometimes resulted in fights and pitch invasions, making the Swedish press view IFK and Örgryte fans as the scum of Swedish football. The derbies between the two teams have attracted some of the highest attendance in Swedish football. The fixture attracted 52,194 spectators in 1959, an all-time Allsvenskan record. The rivalry has decreased in recent years due to the decline of Örgryte IS.

==== IFK Göteborg vs GAIS ====
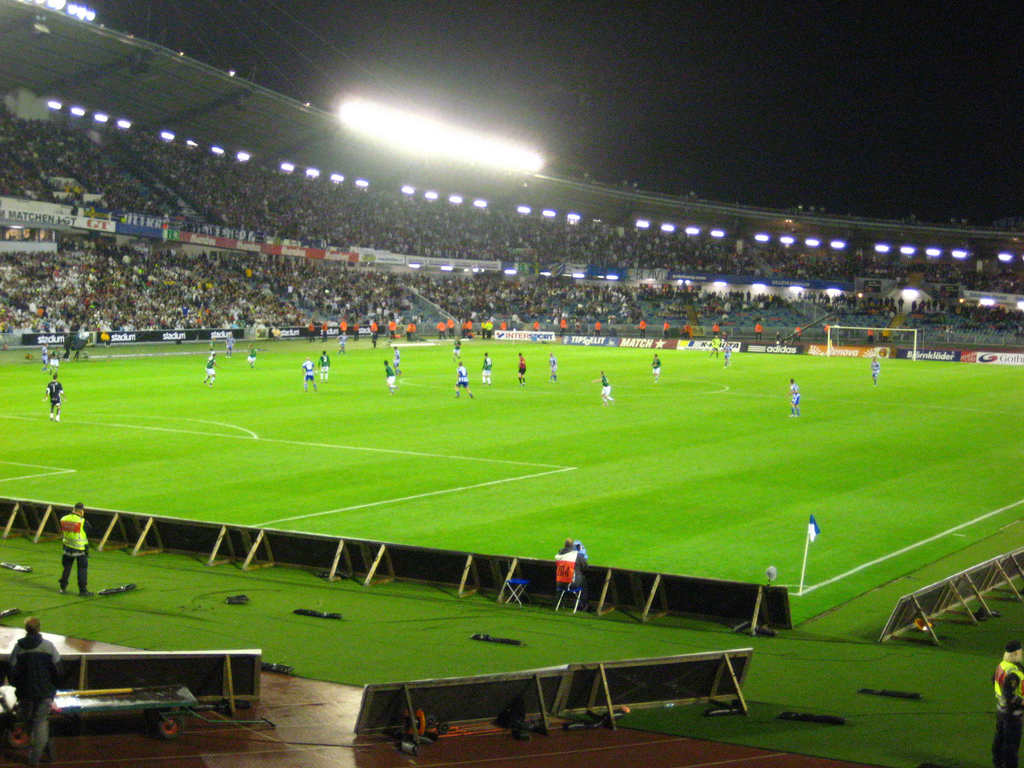
IFK Göteborg vs GAIS in the 2008 Allsvenskan

IFK Göteborg and GAIS are the two best supported clubs in the city with 50 percent and 12 percent of the city respectively supporting them. Both club's supporters are historically working-class. The biggest attendance in Göteborgsklassikern (lit. 'the Gothenburg Classic') is 50,690 at Nya Ullevi stadium.

==== GAIS vs Örgryte ====
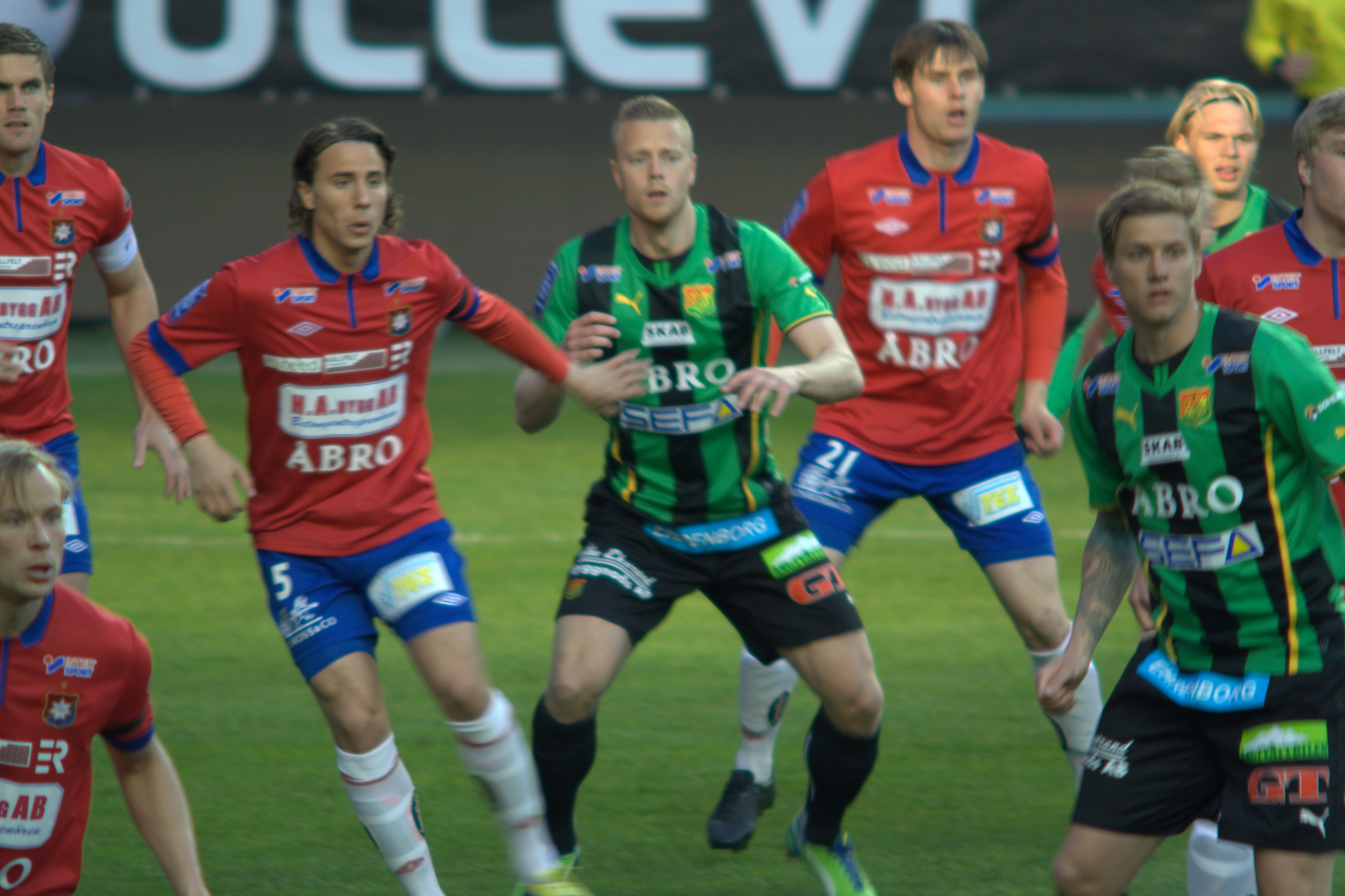
GAIS vs Örgryte IS in the 2013 Superettan

Games between the second most popular club of Gothenburg, GAIS, supported by 12 percent of the city, and third most popular, Örgryte, supported by 11 percent, do not stir up the same kind of emotion as the other derbies in the city tend to do. Though there is some ill feeling between the clubs due to GAIS traditionally being seen as a working-class club and Örgryte being seen as an upper-class club.

==== BK Häcken ====
As the smallest club of the Gothenburg area, and based on the island Hisingen, the rivalry with the bigger clubs in Gothenburg is not especially strong but has increased due BK Häcken having established itself as a first-tier club. In the 2012 Allsvenskan they finished as runners up, and in 2022 they won it.

When Häcken won the national title in 2022, Örgryte player Elias Gustafsson was seen celebrating in an Häcken jersey together with his brothers Simon and Samuel Gustafsson, both playing for Häcken. Örgryte left Elias Gustafson out of their squad in their upcoming 2022 Superettan relegation play-off against Sandvikens IF and, after the season, mutually agreed on releasing Elias Gustafson from his contract with the club.

=== IFK Malmö vs Malmö FF ===
The rivalry between IFK Malmö and Malmö FF was significant rivalry in the early 20th century, since the 1960s the clubs have played only one cup fixture.

More recently, the kit manager of Malmö FF, Kenneth Folkesson, doubled as coach for IFK Malmö in 2010.

=== Assyriska FF vs Syrianska FC ===
Assyriska and Syrianska are based in the city of Södertälje sharing the 6,700 capacity Södertälje Fotbollsarena. The two sides are the most successful and popular "immigrant clubs" in Sweden and are mostly supported by Assyrians. Assyriska were founded in 1971 and Syrianska in 1977 by Assyrian refugees.

For longtime Hammarby player Suleyman Sleyman, in 2009 in Syrianska, the match was "greater than a Stockholm derby".

=== IFK Norrköping vs Sleipner ===
Sleipner were in the early 20th century seen as the working-class club in Norrköping, and the sides battled in Allsvenskan up until the 1940s. After that Sleipner has fallen through the divisions however and the rivalry with IFK Norrköping is all but forgotten today, except among older generations.

=== Halmstads BK vs IS Halmia ===
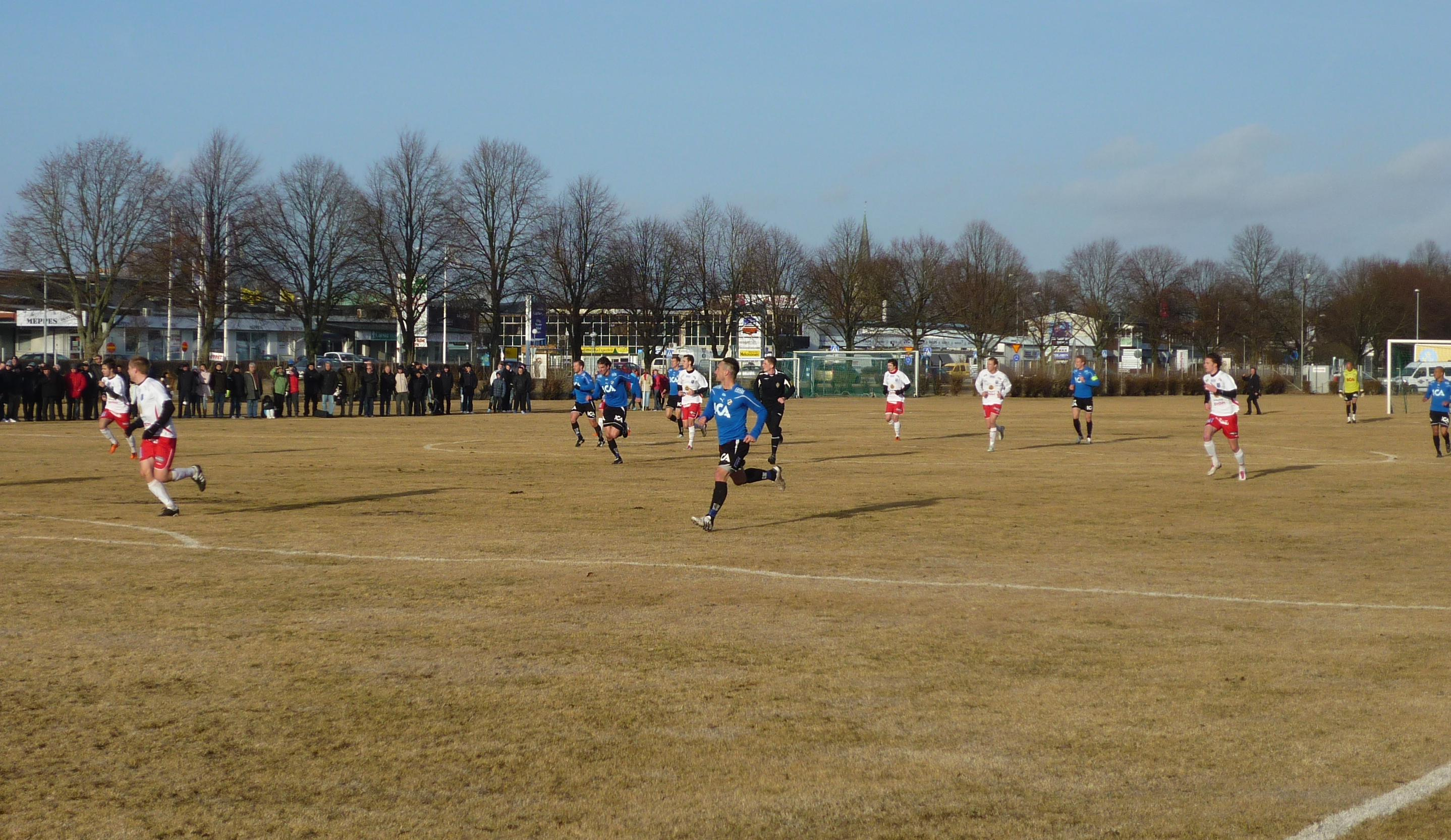
Halmia vs Halmstads BK in a 2011 pre-season friendly

A derby played in the town of Halmstad, with both teams, Halmstads BK and IS Halmia, sharing the main local football stadium Örjans Vall. The majority of the matches have been played in the leagues just below Allsvenskan. Halmia being the dominant team until the 1930s when the teams became more evenly matched. The last competitive derby, to date, was played in 1979 as Halmia was relegated the same year and has fallen through to lower tier. The derbies that have been played since have mainly been friendly matches or in local youth competitions.

== Regional rivalries ==
=== Skåne County ===
==== Helsingborgs IF vs Malmö FF ====
The match between Helsingborgs IF and Malmö FF is known as Skånederbyt and is a significant rivalry between the two most successful sides from the southern part of the country and the county of Scania.

==== Helsingborgs IF vs Landskrona BoIS ====
The match between Helsingborgs IF and Landskrona BoIS is known as Nordvästra Skånederbyt and is a match between the two biggest clubs from the northwestern part of the county of Scania.

==== Malmö FF vs Trelleborgs FF ====
The match between Malmö FF and Trelleborgs FF is known as Sydvästra Skånederbyt and is a minor rivalry solely based on geography between two clubs from the southwestern part of Scania.

==== IFK Malmö vs Torns IF vs Lunds BK ====
The fixture is known as Lilla Skånederbyt. A minor rivalry between IFK Malmö and Torns IF and Lunds BK

=== Västra Götaland County ===
==== IF Elfsborg vs IFK Göteborg ====
The fixture between IF Elfsborg and IFK Göteborg is known as the Västderbyt (lit. 'the Western Derby') or as El Västico. Elfsborg is based in Borås, 65 kilometers east of Gothenburg, where IFK Göteborg resides.

Ljungskile SK vs IK Oddevold

This regional derby between IK Oddevold from Uddevalla and Ljungskile SK from Ljungskile is a smaller but known "Västgöta derby".

=== Halland ===
==== Halmstad BK vs Falkenbergs FF vs Varbergs BoIS ====
Derbies in Halland consist mainly of fixtures between the highest ranking teams Halmstads BK, Falkenbergs FF and Varbergs BoIS.

The biggest rivalry in the province is between Falkenbergs FF and Halmstads BK. These are the two clubs with the most supporters in the province and the games attract relatively big crowds. The fixture between the two coastal cities in southern Halland is sometimes jokingly referred to as El Custico, a wordplay on kust (lit. 'coast') and Spanish clásico (lit. 'classic').

Games between Varbergs BoIS and Falkenbergs FF also attract relatively big crowds.

Halmstads BK vs. Varbergs BoIS is a minor rivalry, due to the fact that both Halmstad and Varberg consider Falkenberg their biggest rivals. Falkenberg is situated at a roughly equal distance between Halmstad and Varberg.

=== Småland ===
Four clubs from the province of Småland have played in the top-tier league Allsvenskan on different occasions – Jönköpings Södra, Kalmar FF, Öster, and IFK Värnamo.

==== Kalmar FF vs Östers IF ====
The two most supported clubs in the historical province of Småland fight the Smålandsderbyt. Östers IF from Växjö have four titles in Allsvenskan and Kalmar FF have one title.

In November 2012, Kalmar FF filed a trademark registration for Smålands stolthet (lit. 'Pride of Småland'), to be accepted in February 2013, which was also used by Östers IF. Although the two clubs are not playing in the same division, the clubs are close in the Allsvenskan all-time standings, with Kalmar FF overtaking Öster in 2019.

Östers IF vs IFK Värnamo

This fixture also being called a "Smålandsderby" has been reported for having an intense local interest and high attendances. Beyond the pitch, the rivalry intensified in 2017 when Öster attempted to recruit Värnamo's contracted coach, Christian Järdler, Värnamo's chairman Kaj Larsson, to label the move a "declaration of war," as reported by newspaper Aftonbladet.

==== Jönköpings Södra IF vs Östers IF ====
Both clubs are situated in the same province of Småland and currently play in the Superettan (second division) league. The ambition to create a rivalry comes mainly from Jönköpings Södra IF fans, this is only met with disappointment from Öster fans who cannot recognize them enough as a true rival, due to the Jönköping Södra team's lack of "real fans" and historical fixtures with Öster.

Husqvarna FF vs Jönköpings Södra IF

The rivalry between these clubs is a local derby based on geographic proximity, as Huskvarna and Jönköping are neighboring towns in the same municipality.

=== Norrland ===
==== GIF Sundsvall vs Östersunds FK ====
GIF Sundsvall and Östersunds FK are the only two Norrland sides (except for Gävle sides in southern Norrland) who have competed in the first tier in recent years, and are based in two neighbouring provinces, Medelpad and Jämtland, whose inhabitants also have a rivalry outside sports. There is a 190-kilometer distance between the two cities who are roughly the same size.

When the teams first met in Allsvenskan in 2016, Östersunds FK personnel Lasse Landin stated that "There is traditionally a rivalry between the two cities of Östersund and Sundsvall but the teams have no rivalry in that sense". According to Bo Oscarsson in P4 Jämtland, the rivalry between inland Östersund and coastal Sundsvall stems from the 19th century, when milling magnates from Sundsvall cheated people from Jämtland on their forests. The first match drew an attendance of almost 7,500 people.

==== GIF Sundsvall vs Umeå FC ====
The match between GIF Sundsvall and Umeå FC has been seen as the most prestigious derby in Norrland, the northern part of Sweden. Even though the distance between the cities is 264 kilometres (164 mi). Sundsvall also has a minor derby against Gefle IF in Norrland. Ice hockey is given more attention than football in Norrland, and its derbies are considered more prestigious.

=== Örebro SK vs Degerfors IF ===
The derby between Örebro SK and Degerfors IF in Örebro County is known as the Länsderbyt (lit. 'the County Derby'). Even though Degerfors historically belongs to the province of Värmland and Örebro SK to the province of Närke, the rivalry is relatively fierce.

In the 1993 match in Degerfors, a brutal tackle against Degerfors player Ulf Ottosson and a late equalising goal from Örebro SK lead to Degerfors supporters chasing the referee out of town.

=== Östergötland ===
Six clubs from the province of Östergötland have played in the top-tier league Allsvenskan on different occasions – Åtvidaberg, Derby, Motala AIF, IFK Norrköping, Saab, and Sleipner.

==== IFK Norrköping vs Åtvidabergs FF ====
IFK Norrköping vs Åtvidabergs FF is known as Östgötaderbyt (lit. 'the Östergötland Derby'). It is the fixture between the two most successful clubs in the province of Östergötland. The fixture also gains prestige from Åtvidaberg's proximity to Linköping, the largest city in the province, who itself has a rivalry with Norrköping, the second largest city in the province.

=== IK Sirius vs Västerås SK ===
Predominantly a bandy fixture between Sirius and Västerås SK bandy teams, the two football teams, Sirius and Västerås SK, faced each other in the Arosderbyt (lit. 'the Aros Derby') in the 2024 Allsvenskan. The name originates from the old names Västra Aros for Västerås and Östra Aros for Uppsala.

The cities are 80 kilometres (50 mi) apart.

== Sporting rivalries ==
=== IFK Göteborg vs Malmö FF ===
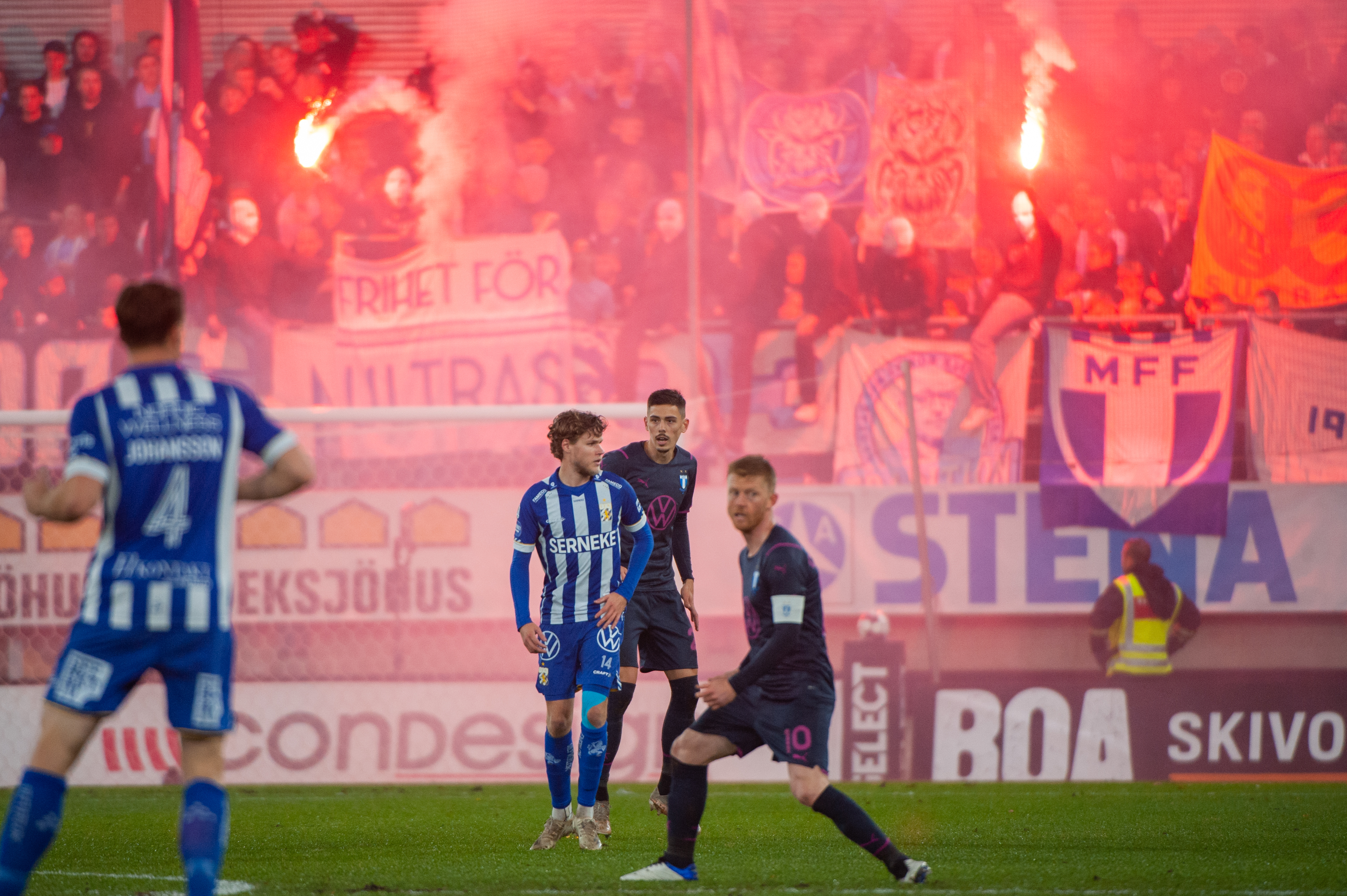
IFK Göteborg vs Malmö FF in the 2022 Allsvenskan

IFK Göteborg and Malmö FF are the two most successful sides in Sweden in terms of national titles. The rivalry was at its most significant in the 1980s when both clubs dominated Swedish football. The fixture is sometimes referred to as the Mesta mästarmötet (lit. 'the Clash of Most Champions').

=== AIK vs IFK Göteborg ===
The match between AIK and IFK Göteborg is the biggest rivalry between a Stockholm-based club and a Gothenburg-based club. It can be said to be a footballing rivalry as well as inter-city based rivalry between the most successful teams from Stockholm and Gothenburg respectively. The nation's two largest cities share a big inter-city rivalry. Fixtures between different clubs from the two cities are seen as important, but this clash is the only one which can be seen as a full on rivalry.

=== Hammarby vs Malmö FF ===
Any Stockholm club are not seen well in Malmö, something which has a long history with 1658 as a significant year. A higher Hammarby vs Malmö FF rivalry ignited in 2019 when Zlatan Ibrahimović bought shares in Hammarby. Shortly thereafter, the statue of Ibrahimović in Malmö, Zlatan by Peter Linde, was vandalised together with the door to Ibrahimović's home in Stockholm. On 22 December 2019, the nose of Ibrahimović was removed from the statue.

== Women's football derbies ==
=== Malmö vs Rosengård ===
The Malmö derby is contested between Malmö FF and FC Rosengård. Malmö was the original FC Rosengård before merging and renaming while Malmö was again recreated in 2020.
