= Hesdey Suart =

Dutch footballer

Personal information
- Full name: Hesdey Suart
- Date of birth: 30 January 1986 (age 40)
- Place of birth: Capelle aan den IJssel, Netherlands
- Height: 1.73 m (5 ft 8 in)
- Position: Left-back

Youth career
- SVS Capelle aan den IJssel
- 2001–2002: SC Feyenoord
- 2002–2005: Vitesse

Senior career*
Years	Team	Apps	(Gls)
2005–2006	Vitesse	0	(0)
2007	→ Helmond Sport (loan)	15	(1)
2007–2009	Helmond Sport	49	(1)
2009–2010	AGOVV	32	(2)
2010–2012	Cracovia	33	(1)
2012–2013	Presikhaaf		
2013–2015	DFS		
2015–2017	AWC		

International career
2005	Netherlands U19	2	(0)
- * Club domestic league appearances and goals

Hesdey Suart (born 30 January 1986) is a Dutch former professional footballer who played as a left-back. He is of Surinamese origin.

== Club career ==
Born in Capelle aan den IJssel, Suart began playing football with local club SVS Capelle aan den IJssel before being scouted by Feyenoord. After one year, he moved to Vitesse youth academy, where he was included in the first team squad in 2005, but failed to make an appearance. In order for him to gain more playing time, he was sent on a six-month loan to Eerste Divisie club Helmond Sport on 3 January 2007. After his loan ended, the club signed him on a permanent deal. Suart moved to AGOVV in 2007.

In the summer of 2010, he moved to Polish club Cracovia on a three-year contract. After two years with Cracovia in the Polish Ekstraklasa he returned to the Netherlands in 2012 and signed for amateur club FC Presikhaaf. After six months, Suart was close to signing a contract with Greek club Iraklis Psachna, but the transfer fell through because of financial irregularities.

In June 2013, Suart signed with DFS. Suart finished his footballing career with AWC from Wijchen.

== International career ==
Suart gained two caps for the Netherlands national under-19 team, making his international debut on 23 March 2005 in a friendly against Austria.
