= Isaiah Ahmed =

Footballer (born 2005)

- Ahmed with Telstar in 2026

Personal information
- Date of birth: 28 December 2005 (age 20)
- Place of birth: Utrecht, Netherlands
- Height: 1.86 m (6 ft 1 in)
- Position: Midfielder

Team information
- Current team: Telstar
- Number: 6

Youth career
- 2009–: DESTO
- –2019: UVV
- 2019–2021: Alphense Boys
- 2021–2024: Heerenveen

Senior career*
Years	Team	Apps	(Gls)
2024–2026	Heerenveen	3	(0)
2026–	Telstar	5	(0)

International career
2024	Curaçao U20	4	(0)
- * Club domestic league appearances and goals as of 10:00, 10 November 2026 (UTC)

Isaiah Ahmed (born 28 December 2005) is a professional footballer who plays as a midfielder for Eredivisie club Telstar. Born in the Netherlands, he is of Nigerian and Curaçaoan descent and has represented Curaçao at under-20 international level.

== Club career ==
=== Early years ===
Ahmed was born and raised in Utrecht. He began playing football at DESTO at the age of three, a year below the club's normal minimum age of four, having watched his older brother play. He went on to play youth football for UVV before joining Alphense Boys in 2019 to "take a step up". With Alphense Boys he was part of a side promoted to the highest level in its age group, and he subsequently trialled with five professional academies, among them PEC Zwolle and Heerenveen. He joined Heerenveen's academy at under-17 level in 2021.

=== Heerenveen ===
Ahmed made his professional debut for Heerenveen on 31 August 2024, replacing Espen van Ee in the 82nd minute of a 4–0 Eredivisie home win over NAC Breda, Robin van Persie's first match in charge of the club. It proved his only appearance of the 2024–25 season. In the 2025–26 season he made two further league appearances, both as a late substitute, in wins over NEC and Telstar.

=== Telstar ===
On 24 July 2026, Ahmed signed a three-year contract with newly promoted Eredivisie club Telstar, rejoining Henk Brugge, his former academy coach at Heerenveen, who had recently been appointed Telstar head coach. He made his competitive debut on 8 August 2026, the opening day of the 2026–27 season, replacing Gerald Alders in the 64th minute of a 2–1 away win over NEC.

== International career ==
Ahmed is of Nigerian and Curaçaoan descent. He has represented Curaçao at under-20 level.

== Career statistics ==
As of match played 7 November 2026

Appearances and goals by club, season and competition
Club	Season	League			KNVB Cup		Other		Total	
Club	Season	Division	Apps	Goals	Apps	Goals	Apps	Goals	Apps	Goals
Heerenveen	2024–25	Eredivisie	1	0	0	0	0	0	1	0
Heerenveen	2025–26	Eredivisie	2	0	0	0	0	0	2	0
Heerenveen	Total		3	0	0	0	0	0	3	0
Telstar	2026–27	Eredivisie	5	0	1	0	—		6	0
Career total			8	0	1	0	0	0	9	0
