= Miloš Luković =

Serbian footballer (born 2005)

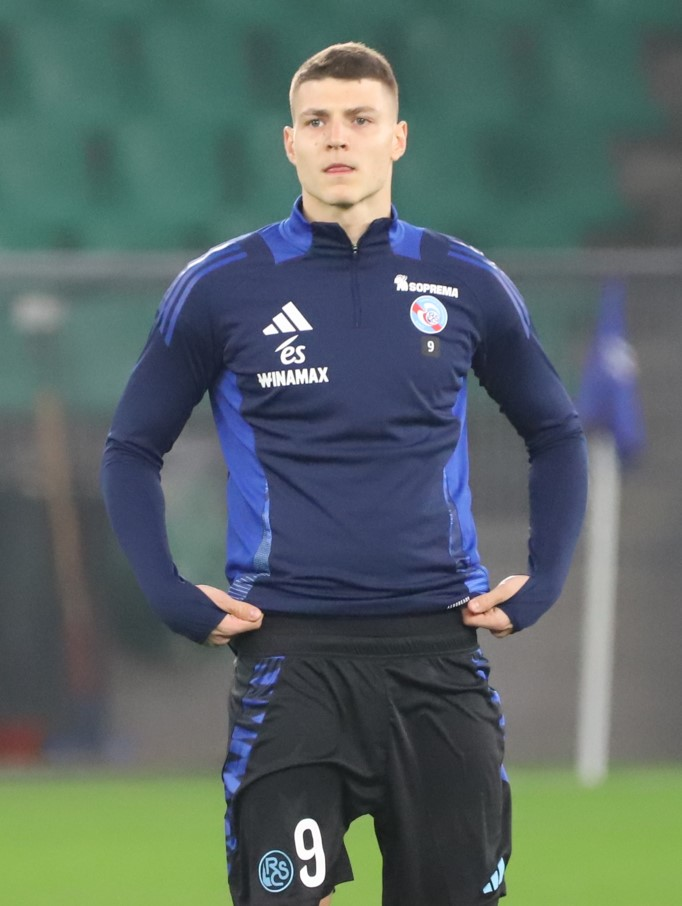
- Luković in 2024

Personal information
- Date of birth: 18 November 2005 (age 20)
- Place of birth: Belgrade, Serbia and Montenegro
- Height: 1.84 m (6 ft 0 in)
- Position: Forward

Team information
- Current team: 1. FC Kaiserslautern; (on loan from Strasbourg)
- Number: 45

Youth career
- IMT

Senior career*
Years	Team	Apps	(Gls)
2021–2024	IMT	83	(35)
2024–	Strasbourg	2	(0)
2024	Strasbourg B	2	(0)
2025	→ Heerenveen (loan)	13	(3)
2025–2026	→ Las Palmas (loan)	17	(4)
2026	→ Preston North End (loan)	1	(0)
2026–	→ 1. FC Kaiserslautern (loan)	0	(0)

International career^{‡}
2022–2024	Serbia U19	4	(0)
2023–	Serbia U21	7	(0)
- * Club domestic league appearances and goals as of 30 August 2026 ‡ National team caps and goals as of 11:19, 29 January 2026 (UTC)

Miloš Luković (Serbian Cyrillic: Милош Луковић; born 18 November 2005) is a Serbian professional footballer who plays as a forward for 2. Bundesliga club 1. FC Kaiserslautern, on loan from Ligue 1 club Strasbourg.

== Early life ==
Luković was born in New Belgrade, in Belgrade, Serbia.

== Club career ==
Having scored 54 goals at youth level, and making his professional debut in late 2021, Luković attracted attention from Premier League side Manchester City. Having helped IMT to promotion to the Serbian SuperLiga, Luković was named club captain for the 2023–24 season.

=== Strasbourg ===
In January 2024, he joined Ligue 1 side Strasbourg on a deal until June 2028, returning to IMT on loan until the end of the season.

==== Loan to Heerenveen ====
On 6 January 2025, Luković was loaned by Heerenveen in the Netherlands.

==== Loans to Las Palmas and Preston North End ====
On 12 August 2025, Luković joined Las Palmas on loan until the end of the 2025–26 season. However, the loan was cut short on 29 January 2026.

The following day, Luković headed out on loan again, this time joining Championship side Preston North End on loan until the end of the season.

==== Loan to Kaiserslautern ====
On 27 August 2026, Luković moved on a new loan to 1. FC Kaiserslautern in German 2. Bundesliga.

== International career ==
Luković has represented Serbia at under-19 level, featuring in two matches in 2022, against France and Portugal.

== Personal life ==
Luković's brother, Luka, is also a footballer, and has played professionally in Serbia, Switzerland and Belgium.

== Career statistics ==
As of 7 February 2026

Appearances and goals by club, season and competition
Club	Season	League			Cup		Other		Total	
Club	Season	Division	Apps	Goals	Apps	Goals	Apps	Goals	Apps	Goals
IMT	2021–22	Serbian First League	11	3	0	0	2 (Note: Appearances in Serbian First League promotion playoffs)	1	13	4
IMT	2022–23	Serbian First League	35	15	2	1	–		37	16
IMT	2023–24	Serbian SuperLiga	37	17	1	1	–		38	18
IMT	Total		83	35	3	2	2	1	88	38
Strasbourg	2024–25	Ligue 1	2	0	0	0	–		2	0
Strasbourg	2026–27	Ligue 1	0	0	0	0	–		0	0
Strasbourg	Total		2	0	0	0	–		2	0
Heerenveen (loan)	2024–25	Eredivisie	13	3	–		1 (Note: Appearance in European play-offs)	0	14	3
Las Palmas (loan)	2025–26	Segunda División	17	4	1	0	–		18	4
Preston North End (loan)	2025–26	Championship	1	0	–		–		1	0
Career total			127	45	4	2	3	1	134	48

== Honours ==
IMT

- Serbian First League: 2022–23

Individual

- Serbian SuperLiga Top Scorer: 2023–24
- Serbian First League Top Scorer: 2022–23
