= Eser Gürbüz =

Dutch footballer (born 2007)

Personal information
- Date of birth: 6 March 2007 (age 19)
- Place of birth: Arnhem, Netherlands
- Height: 1.78 m (5 ft 10 in)
- Position: Winger

Team information
- Current team: Willem II (on loan from Heerenveen)
- Number: 50

Youth career
- FC Presikhaaf
- SC Veluwezoom
- 2017–2020: SML Arnhem
- 2020–2023: Go Ahead Eagles
- 2023–2025: Heerenveen

Senior career*
Years	Team	Apps	(Gls)
2025–	Heerenveen	27	(3)
2026–	→ Willem II (loan)	5	(0)

International career^{‡}
2023–2024	Netherlands U17	10	(1)
2024–2025	Netherlands U18	6	(0)
2025–	Netherlands U19	9	(1)
- * Club domestic league appearances and goals as of 17 September 2026 ‡ National team caps and goals as of 31 March 2026

Eser Gürbüz (born 6 March 2007) is a Dutch professional footballer who plays as a winger for Eredivisie club Willem II, on loan from Heerenveen.

== Club career ==
Gürbüz is a product of the youth academies of FC Presikhaaf, SC Veluwezoom, SML Arnhem, and Go Ahead Eagles. On 13 April 2023, he moved to Heerenveen where he signed a three-year contract. On 11 November 2024, he extended his contract with the club until 2027. In January 2025, he was promoted to Heerenven's senior team. He made his senior and professional debut with Heerenveen as a substitute in a 2–2 Eredivisie tie with Fortuna Sittard on 2 February 2025, and scored his side's second goal in the 82nd minute.

On 21 July 2026, Gürbüz was loaned by Willem II for one season.

== International career ==
Born in the Netherlands, Gürbüz is of Turkish descent. He is a youth international for the Netherlands, having played up to the Netherlands U18s.

== Personal life ==
Eser's father, Esen Gürbüz, was a prolific semi-professional footballer in the Netherlands.

== Honours ==
Individual

- Eredivisie Team of the Month: February 2025
