= Statue of Zlatan =

Former public sculpture in Malmö, Sweden

Coordinates: 55°35′06″N 12°59′17″E

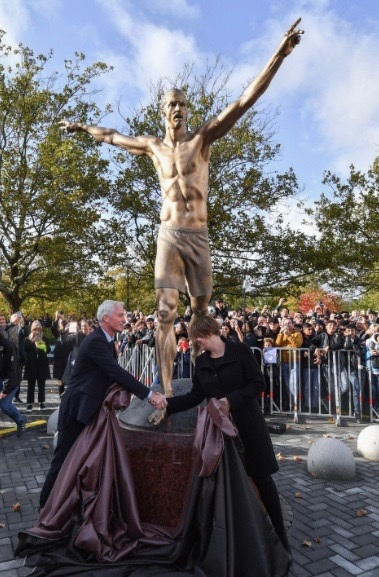
The statue of Zlatan during its unveiling in October 2019.

The statue of Zlatan (Swedish: Zlatanstatyn) was a statue depicting the Swedish footballer Zlatan Ibrahimović, created by the sculptor Peter Linde at the end of 2017, at the request of the Swedish Football Association. From the beginning the statue was planned to be placed at Friends Arena in Stockholm, but was finally unveiled at the Eleda Stadion in Malmö, the home stadium of Malmö FF, the club where Ibrahimović started his career. After several cases of vandalism it was removed from its plinth on 5 January 2020.

== Unveiling ==
In the afternoon on 8 October 2019, the statue of Zlatan was unveiled at the football stadium in Malmö in front of thousands of fans and Ibrahimović attending the ceremony. The statue is to serve as a reminder of where Ibrahimović's career started.

== The statue ==
The statue of Zlatan is three metres high and depicts Ibrahimović standing with open arms. His eyes are focused and he is bare chested and wearing shorts as he steps over the world globe with determined steps. The bronze statue weighs 500 kilograms, and is placed on an eight tonne frame in red granite. Malmö City municipality stated that the cost of the statue was 500,000 Swedish kronor and with an annual maintenance cost of 15,000 kronor, costs that Malmö City will pay.

On the ground and right under the statue there are inscriptions into granite based tiles with the clubs Ibrahimović has played for, and the many titles in football that he has won.

== Vandalism ==
In November 2019, the statue was vandalised when white paint was sprayed on it. It was also burned with flares and with threats and hateful messages written on the statue. The vandalism was done after it was revealed that Ibrahimović had become part-owner of the football club Hammarby IF, and had stated that he wanted to make Hammarby into the best football club in Scandinavia. As Hammarby are league rivals of Malmö, many Malmö supporters saw this as a betrayal from Ibrahimović.

In December 2019, the statue was vandalised again when the statue's leg was sawn off. The statue was sprayed with silver paint during the night of 22 December 2019, and its nose was sawn off and completely removed. A toe on the left foot was also removed.

In the early morning of 5 January 2020, the statue was toppled, and later that day removed for repair. An art expert commented a few days earlier that it might be preserved for the future by keeping it indoors. The statue was repaired by Linde in 2023 at a cost of 350,000 SEK; as of 2024, Malmö's kommunstyrelse has not yet decided where the statue will be placed.

== See also ==
- Halo effect
