= Hussein Ali (footballer, born 2002) =

Iraqi footballer (born 2002)

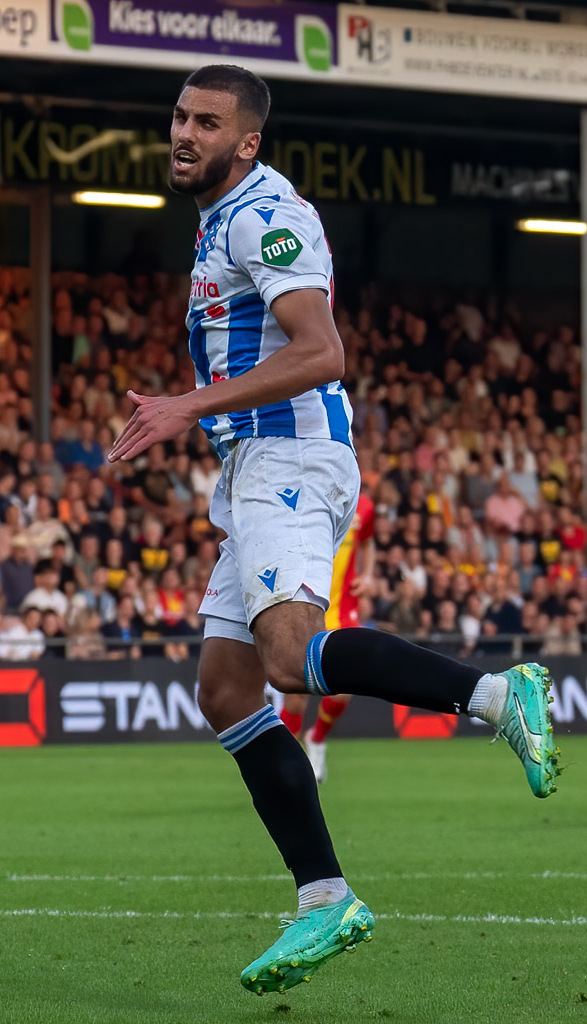
- Ali with Heerenveen in 2023

Personal information
- Full name: Hussein Haydar Hussein Ali
- Date of birth: 1 March 2002 (age 24)
- Place of birth: Malmö, Sweden
- Height: 1.82 m (6 ft 0 in)
- Position: Right-back

Team information
- Current team: Pogoń Szczecin
- Number: 15

Youth career
- –2019: Malmö FF

Senior career*
Years	Team	Apps	(Gls)
2019–2022	Örebro SK	58	(0)
2022–2025	Heerenveen	26	(0)
2025–	Pogoń Szczecin	23	(2)

International career^{‡}
2018–2019	Sweden U17	15	(0)
2019–2020	Sweden U19	3	(0)
2021–2022	Sweden U21	5	(0)
2023–	Iraq	29	(1)
- * Club domestic league appearances and goals as of 08:06, 24 September 2026 (UTC) ‡ National team caps and goals as of 08:09, 23 June 2026 (UTC)

Hussein Haydar Hussein Ali (Arabic: حُسَيْن حَيْدَر حُسَيْن عَلِيّ; born 1 March 2002) is a professional footballer who plays as a right-back for Ekstraklasa club Pogoń Szczecin. Born in Sweden, he plays for the Iraq national team.

== Club career ==
Born in Malmö, Sweden, Hussein Ali was trained by his hometown club, the Malmö FF, but did not play any matches for the first team. In August 2019, at the age of 17, he joined Örebro SK, and made this choice because of the strong competition in Malmö and considering that he would have more chances in Örebro. He made his first professional appearance for Örebro in a Allsvenskan match against IFK Norrköping on 21 September 2019.

On 19 July 2022, Ali joined Eredivisie side Heerenveen on a three-year contract.

On 18 September 2025, Ali signed a three-year deal with Ekstraklasa club Pogoń Szczecin.

== International career ==
Ali represented Sweden at youth international level.

In August 2023, he officially switched allegiances to Iraq, and received his first call-up to the senior national team for the 2023 King's Cup.

He was one of twenty-six Iraqi players selected by Jesús Casas to compete in the 2023 AFC Asian Cup.

== Personal life ==
Born in Sweden, Ali is of Iraqi Arab descent.

== Career statistics ==
=== Club ===
As of match played 20 September 2026

Appearances and goals by club, season and competition
Club	Season	League			National cup (Note: Includes Svenska Cupen, KNVB Cup, Polish Cup)		Europe		Other		Total	
Club	Season	Division	Apps	Goals	Apps	Goals	Apps	Goals	Apps	Goals	Apps	Goals
Örebro SK	2019	Allsvenskan	3	0	0	0	—		—		3	0
Örebro SK	2020	Allsvenskan	22	0	4	0	—		—		26	0
Örebro SK	2021	Allsvenskan	27	0	1	0	—		—		28	0
Örebro SK	2022	Superettan	6	0	0	0	—		—		6	0
Örebro SK	Total		58	0	5	0	0	0	—		63	0
SC Heerenveen	2022–23	Eredivisie	5	0	1	0	—		1 (Note: Appearance in Eredivisie Conference League play-offs)	0	7	0
SC Heerenveen	2023–24	Eredivisie	15	0	1	0	—		—		16	0
SC Heerenveen	2024–25	Eredivisie	6	0	1	0	—		1	0	8	0
SC Heerenveen	Total		26	0	3	0	—		2	0	31	0
Pogoń Szczecin	2025–26	Ekstraklasa	16	2	0	0	—		—		16	2
Pogoń Szczecin	2026–27	Ekstraklasa	7	0	1	0	—		—		8	0
Pogoń Szczecin	Total		23	2	1	0	—		—		24	2
Career total			107	2	9	0	0	0	2	0	118	2

=== International ===
As of match played 22 June 2026

Appearances and goals by national team and year
National team	Year	Apps	Goals
Iraq	2023	4	0
Iraq	2024	14	1
Iraq	2025	6	0
Iraq	2026	5	0
Total		29	1

Scores and results list Iraq's goal tally first, score column indicates score after each Ali goal.

List of international goals scored by Hussein Ali
No.	Date	Venue	Opponent	Score	Result	Competition
1	11 June 2024	Basra International Stadium, Basra, Iraq	Vietnam	1–0	3–1	2026 FIFA World Cup qualification
