= Jacob Trenskow =

Danish footballer (born 2000)

Personal information
- Full name: Jacob Bennedsen Trenskow
- Date of birth: 26 November 2000 (age 25)
- Height: 1.78 m (5 ft 10 in)
- Position: Forward

Team information
- Current team: Heerenveen
- Number: 20

Youth career
- –2020: AGF

Senior career*
Years	Team	Apps	(Gls)
2020–2021	Horsens	0	(0)
2021	NSÍ Runavík	25	(6)
2022–2023	HB Køge	41	(10)
2023–2024	Kalmar FF	28	(4)
2024–	Heerenveen	63	(21)
- * Club domestic league appearances and goals as of 31 August 2026

Jacob Bennedsen Trenskow (born 26 November 2000) is a Danish footballer who plays as a forward for Eredivisie club Heerenveen.

== Club career ==
Having been a youth player in Aarhus GF, Trenskow started his senior career with AC Horsens in 2020. He was first given a contract up until the winter break. After playing the 2021 season with Faroese club NSÍ Runavík, Trenskow moved back to Denmark proper and joined second-tier club HB Køge. It took a while before he established himself as a starting player. In the 2022–23 Danish 1st Division, however, Trenskow started 29 of the 30 games he played, scoring 7 goals.

In the summer of 2023, he rejected a contract offer from Køge, and joined Kalmar FF in the middle of the 2023 Allsvenskan season. Trenskow was praised for his 2024 pre-season, which included three goals in the 2023–24 Svenska Cupen. He scored his first Kalmar goal on 8 April 2024 against Sirius. Regarding the start of the 2024 season, Expressen called him "one of the few glimpses of light in a mostly pitch-black Kalmar".

On 9 August 2024, Trenskow signed a four-year contract with Heerenveen in the Netherlands.

== National team ==
In May 2026, he was included in the Danish national team for the first time for the friendly matches against DR Congo and Ukraine.
