= Sven Eriksonsgymnasiet =

Secondary school in Sweden

Coordinates: 57°43′09″N 12°56′00″E

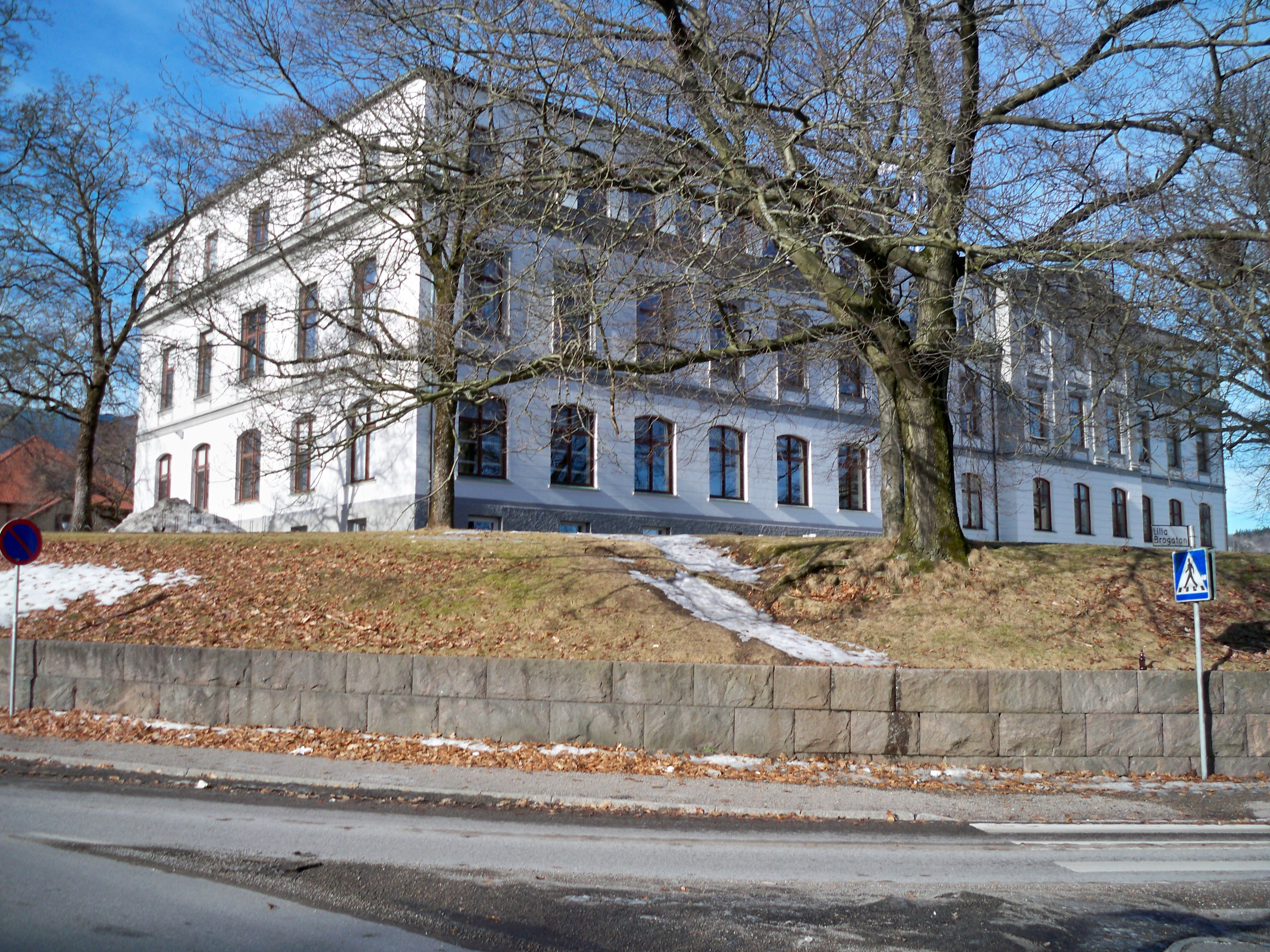
The oldest school building from the founding year 1856. Among other things, the canteen is here nowadays.

Sven Eriksonsgymnasiet is a gymnasium in Borås, Sweden, which has courses in technical sciences, economy, entrepreneuring and International Baccalaureate. It also has various sport courses such as football and ice hockey. The course School of Athletics is one of few in Sweden and Sven Erikson is one of three schools in the country that have a serious commitment to football (soccer) by having a cooperation with the Swedish Football Association .

== Move your boundaries ==
The School of Athletics attracts pupils who are talented in sports and who are prepared to make a serious commitment to both sports and school.

The Sports Programme provides pupils this opportunity along with eligibility for further studies at university. In addition, they develop in their chosen sport and prepare for their future working lives.

Besides their chosen sport and the compulsory core subjects, pupils take courses which are beneficial for athletes such as health and nutrition, training techniques, and mental training. Their chosen sport classes are scheduled for three half-day sessions per week and contain both theory and practice.

RIG - the National Football Upper Secondary School - is also included in the School of Athletics.

== Facts ==
About 1000 students study at Sven Eriksonsgymnasiet each year.

The school is better known as Teknis by the citizens of Borås, due to its history of being a site for higher technical learning.

Teknis was founded in 1856 and is one of the oldest in the entire country of Sweden. It has therefore many traditions.

== Traditions ==
Kortegen

The annual procession held in central Borås is an ancient tradition from 1920. In one week of time the students keep carpentering and building during the night and in the end even in the daytime together various elements of the school. The "Kortege" is always held on May Day out around the city streets where each class show up their own contribution. Inhabitants in Borås are and will probably always go to be out of houses to watch the procession.
