= Osame Sahraoui =

Moroccan footballer (born 2001)

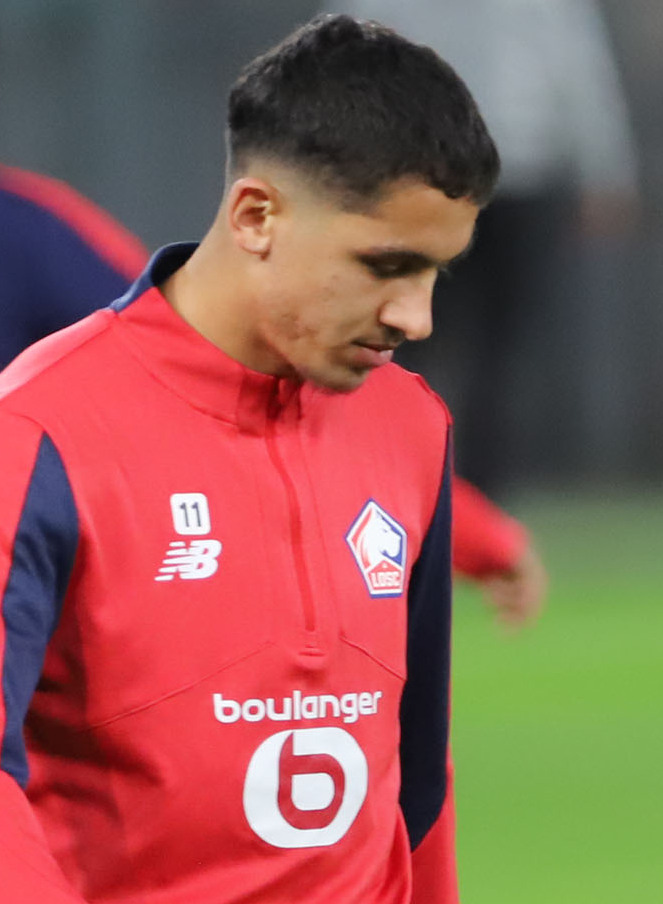
- Sahraoui with Lille in 2024

Personal information
- Date of birth: 11 June 2001 (age 25)
- Place of birth: Oslo, Norway
- Height: 1.71 m (5 ft 7 in)
- Position: Left winger

Team information
- Current team: Lille
- Number: 11

Youth career
- –2013: Hauketo
- 2014–2019: Vålerenga

Senior career*
Years	Team	Apps	(Gls)
2020–2023	Vålerenga	84	(13)
2023–2024	Heerenveen	47	(9)
2024–	Lille	52	(4)

International career^{‡}
2021–2023	Norway U21	13	(2)
2023	Norway	1	(0)
2024–	Morocco	2	(0)
- * Club domestic league appearances and goals as of 10 October 2026 ‡ National team caps and goals as of 9 June 2025

Osame Sahraoui (Arabic: أُسَامَة الصَّحْرَاوِيّ; born 11 June 2001) is a professional footballer who plays as a left winger for Ligue 1 club Lille. Born in Norway, he plays for the Morocco national team.

== Club career ==
=== Vålerenga ===
Growing up in Hauketo IF, Sahraoui joined Vålerenga's youth system in 2014. Steadily advancing in the junior ranks, he signed his first professional contract in May 2019, then made his senior debut in June 2020 against Stabæk, where he provoked a penalty kick that equalised the match. In July 2020, he signed a contract extension which runs until 2023. On 26 July 2020, he scored his first goal for the club in a 2–0 win against Strømsgodset.

=== SC Heerenveen ===
On 31 January 2023, Sahraoui signed a three-and-a-half-year contract with Eredivisie club SC Heerenveen. He made his debut for the club the very next game on 4 Februari against FC Utrecht which resulted in a 1–0 defeat.

=== Lille ===
On 1 August 2024, French club Lille announced the signing of Sahraoui on a five-year contract.

== International career ==
Born in Norway, Sahraoui is of Moroccan descent. He was previously called up to a training camp for Morocco youth national teams.

On 8 October 2021, Sahraoui gained his first cap for the Norway U21 in a match against Croatia.

In August 2023, Sahraoui received his first call-up to the Norway senior national team by head coach Ståle Solbakken, for a friendly match against Jordan and a UEFA Euro 2024 qualifying match against Georgia.

On 30 August 2024, Sahraoui switched nationality to instead represent the Morocco national team. He debuted with Morocco in a 4–0 2025 Africa Cup of Nations qualification win over Central African Republic on 15 October 2024.

== Personal life ==
He was born and raised in Oslo, where his parents moved to from the city of Bni Bouayach in northern Morocco.

Sahraoui's uncle, Mohammed Fellah, is a former professional footballer.

== Career statistics ==
=== Club ===
As of match played 3 November 2026

Appearances and goals by club, season and competition
Club	Season	League			National cup (Note: Includes Norwegian Cup, KNVB Cup)		Continental		Other		Total	
Club	Season	Division	Apps	Goals	Apps	Goals	Apps	Goals	Apps	Goals	Apps	Goals
Vålerenga	2020	Eliteserien	28	5	0	0	–		–		28	5
Vålerenga	2021	Eliteserien	27	2	3	0	2 (Note: Appearances in UEFA Europa Conference League)	0	–		32	2
Vålerenga	2022	Eliteserien	29	6	2	0	–		–		31	6
Vålerenga	Total		84	13	5	0	2	0	–		91	13
Heerenveen	2022–23	Eredivisie	15	1	2	0	–		2 (Note: Appearances in Eredivisie European play-offs)	0	19	1
Heerenveen	2023–24	Eredivisie	32	8	1	0	–		–		33	8
Heerenveen	Total		47	9	3	0	–		2	0	52	9
Lille	2024–25	Ligue 1	30	3	3	0	13 (Note: Appearances in UEFA Champions League)	2	–		46	5
Lille	2025–26	Ligue 1	18	1	2	0	5 (Note: Appearances in UEFA Europa League)	0	–		25	1
Lille	2026–27	Ligue 1	4	0	0	0	2	0	–		6	0
Lille	Total		52	4	5	0	20	2	0	0	77	6
Career total			183	26	13	0	22	2	2	0	220	28

=== International ===
As of match played 9 June 2025

Appearances and goals by national team and year
National team	Year	Apps	Goals
Norway	2023	1	0
Total		1	0
Morocco	2024	1	0
Morocco	2025	1	0
Total		2	0
Career total		3	0

== Honours ==
Individual

- Eliteserien Young Player of the Month: August 2021, August 2022
