= Marcus Linday =

Swedish footballer (born 2003)

Personal information
- Date of birth: 2 June 2003 (age 23)
- Place of birth: Södertälje, Sweden
- Height: 1.89 m (6 ft 2 in)
- Position: Midfielder

Team information
- Current team: Heerenveen
- Number: 16

Youth career
- Pershagens SK
- Assyriska FF

Senior career*
Years	Team	Apps	(Gls)
2020–2023	Assyriska FF	71	(6)
2024	Västerås SK	28	(0)
2025–	Heerenveen	47	(3)
- * Club domestic league appearances and goals as of 19 May 2026

Marcus Linday (born 2 June 2003) is a Swedish professional footballer who plays as a midfielder for Eredivisie club Heerenveen.

== Career ==
Linday started his youth career with Pershagens SK. He made his senior debut for Assyriska FF in 2020. The club languished in the lower leagues, contesting the 2021 Division 1 (third tier) but was relegated to Division 2 (fourth tier). Linday vowed to stay at Assyriska despite offers from other clubs. In 2022, the team had the chance to win promotion via the playoffs, but failed. In 2023, Linday decided to stay for one more season at Assyriska, with the team returning to the third tier.

During his time with Assyriska, Linday consistently made lists of the greatest young talents as well as the best overall players in Division 2.

As the team Västerås SK won promotion to the 2024 Allsvenskan, reaching that level for the first time since 1997, its first signing during the winter transfer window was Marcus Linday. He had been on trial with Västerås in the summer of 2023. Despite going directly from the fourth to the first tier, Linday impressed in the 2023–24 Svenska Cupen match against Hammarby, which Västerås won 2–1 away. He made his Allsvenskan debut in April 2024 against AIK.

On 24 September 2024, Linday signed a four-and-a-half-year contract with Eredivisie club Heerenveen, effective from 1 January 2025.
