= Oliver Braude =

Norwegian footballer (born 2004)

Personal information
- Full name: Oliver Johansen Braude
- Date of birth: 21 February 2004 (age 22)
- Place of birth: Oslo, Norway
- Height: 1.74 m (5 ft 9 in)
- Position: Defender

Team information
- Current team: Heerenveen
- Number: 45

Youth career
- Stabæk
- –2021: Vålerenga
- 2021–2023: Heerenveen

Senior career*
Years	Team	Apps	(Gls)
2023–	Heerenveen	93	(0)

International career^{‡}
2021	Norway U17	1	(0)
2022	Norway U18	9	(0)
2023	Norway U19	6	(0)
2023	Norway U20	3	(1)
2024–	Norway U21	18	(0)
- * Club domestic league appearances and goals as of 19 May 2026 ‡ National team caps and goals as of 14 November 2026

Oliver Johansen Braude (born 21 February 2004) is a Norwegian professional footballer who plays as a defender for Heerenveen.

== Club career ==
Braude was born on 21 February 2004 in Oslo, Norway. As a youth player, he joined the academies of Norwegian clubs Stabæk and Vålerenga. He previously had trials with the youth academies of Spanish side Barcelona, English side Liverpool and Dutch side Ajax. In 2021, he joined the youth academy of Dutch side Heerenveen. He started his senior career with the club.

== International career ==
Braude is a Norwegian youth international. He has represented his country at under‑17 through to under‑21 level. He helped Norway reach the semi-finals of the 2023 UEFA European Under-19 Championship.
