= Peter Linde =

Swedish sculptor

Peter Linde (born 9 February 1946 in Karlshamn) is a Swedish sculptor. He was educated at the Royal Institute of Art in Stockholm in 1970–1975. He is a member of the Royal Swedish Academy of Fine Arts.

Linde has made many public sculptures in Sweden. These include a statue of the writer Hjalmar Söderberg situated outside the National Library in Stockholm since 2010, and a 2011 statue of the boxer Ingemar Johansson outside the stadium Ullevi in Gothenburg.
