= FC Presikhaaf =

Dutch football club

- Full name: Football Club Presikhaaf
- Nickname: Presikhaaf
- Founded: June 1st, 1995
- Ground: Sportpark Over het Lange Water; Arnhem
- Manager: Dennis van Beukering
- League: Saturday: Vierde Klasse; Sunday: Eerste Klasse
Home colours

FC Presikhaaf is a Dutch amateur football club from Presikhaaf, Arnhem, founded in 1995. The club has two teams competing on Saturday and Sunday. In season 2012/13, the Saturday team plays in the Vierde Klasse (Fourth Class), while the Sunday team competes in the Eerste Klasse.

The club is formed in 2006 as a merger between VV Ysseloord and SV Rozendaal. Ysseloord founded in 1995 as a merger between VV Presikhaaf (founded in 1951) and OAB (Oost Arnhemse Boys, founded on 21 January 1928). Rozendaal was founded in 1999 as a merger between Sempre Avanti (1951) and SVD'98 (founded in 1971 as WCA, Woonwagen Centum Arnhem, and later renamed as Sport-Vereniging de Del 1998).

The club consists of 5 men senior teams, 7 junior teams, and 3 student teams. FC Presikhaaf plays with its neighbor Eendracht Arnhem in Sportpark Over het Lange Water, which has 2 fields. Since January 2011, the main field has used artificial grass.
