= Espen van Ee =

Dutch footballer (born 2003)

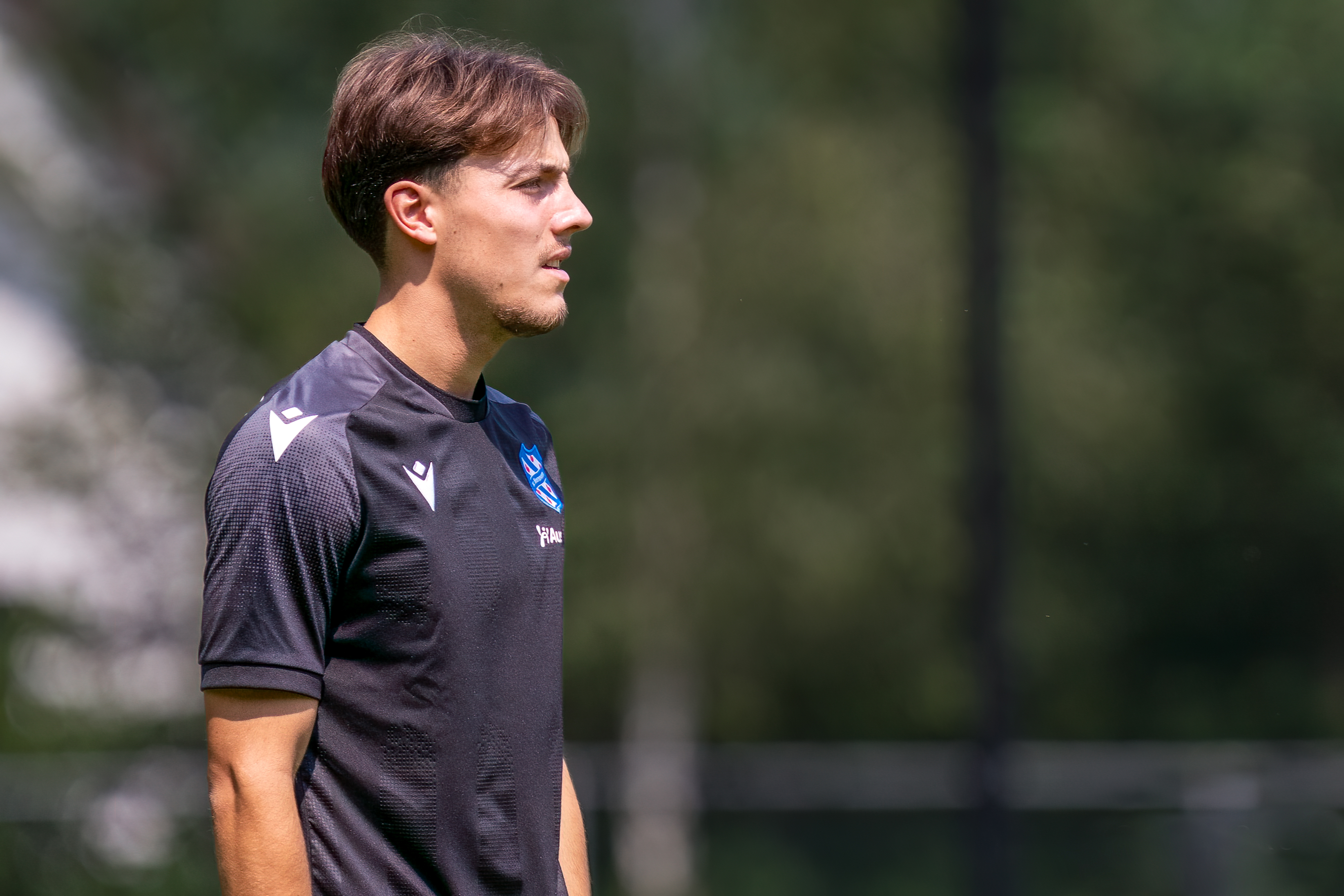
- Van Ee in 2023

Personal information
- Date of birth: 5 July 2003 (age 23)
- Place of birth: IJsselstein, Netherlands
- Height: 1.79 m (5 ft 10 in)
- Position: Midfielder

Team information
- Current team: Arouca
- Number: 6

Youth career
- –2018: Alphense Boys
- 2021–2023: Vitesse

Senior career*
| Years | Team | Apps | (Gls) |
| 2023–2025 | Heerenveen | 51 | (1) |
| 2025– | Arouca | 32 | (3) |
- * Club domestic league appearances and goals as of 16:05, 16 September 2026 (UTC)

Espen van Ee (born 5 July 2003) is a Dutch professional footballer who plays as a midfielder for Primeira Liga club Arouca.

== Career ==
From IJsselstein, in the province of Utrecht, Van Ee came to Vitesse Arnhem from Alphense Boys in 2018. He captained the Vitesse U17 side and signed a three-year professional contract with the club in 2020. In July 2023, he signed for SC Heerenveen. He made his debut in the Eredivisie for Heerenveen against Go Ahead Eagles on 2 September 2023. He scored his first senior goal the following month, in a 5–1 win over VVV Venlo in the KNVB Cup.

On 31 August 2025, van Ee signed a four-year contract with Arouca in the Portuguese top tier.
