= Rinus Michels =

Dutch footballer and manager (1928–2005)

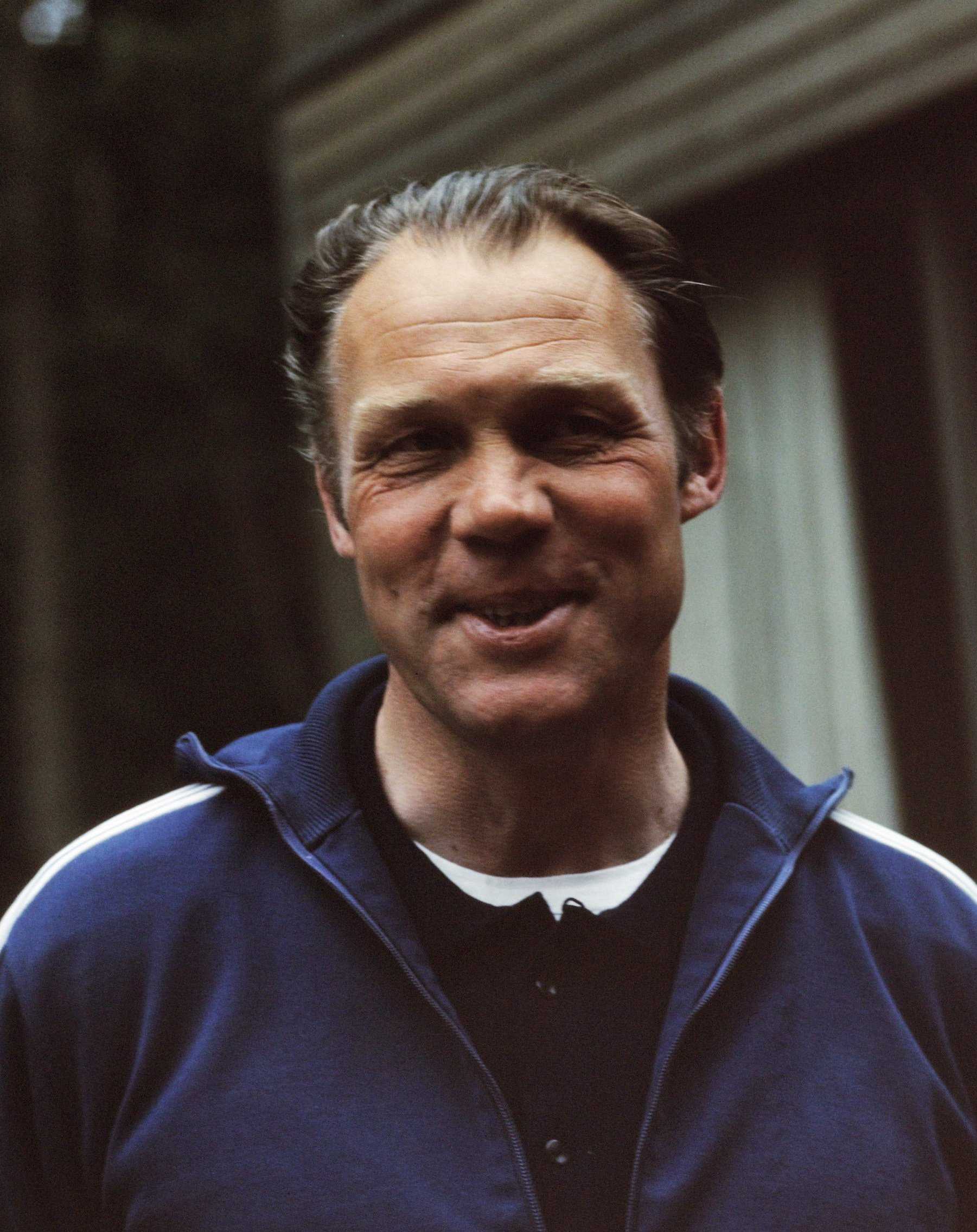
- Michels in 1974

Personal information
- Full name: Marinus Jacobus Hendricus Michels
- Date of birth: 9 February 1928
- Place of birth: Amsterdam, Netherlands
- Date of death: 3 March 2005 (aged 77)
- Place of death: Aalst, Belgium
- Height: 1.86 m (6 ft 1 in)
- Position: Forward

Youth career
- 1940–1946: Ajax

Senior career*
Years	Team	Apps	(Gls)
1945–1958	Ajax	264	(122)

International career
1950–1954	Netherlands	5	(0)

Managerial career
- 1953–1954: Asser Boys
- 1960–1964: JOS
- 1964–1965: A.F.C.
- 1965–1971: Ajax
- 1971–1975: Barcelona
- 1974: Netherlands
- 1975–1976: Ajax
- 1976–1978: Barcelona
- 1979–1980: Los Angeles Aztecs
- 1980–1983: 1. FC Köln
- 1984–1985: Netherlands
- 1986–1988: Netherlands
- 1988–1989: Bayer Leverkusen
- 1990–1992: Netherlands
Medal record
Men's football
Representing Netherlands (as manager)
UEFA European Championship
Winner	1988 West Germany
FIFA World Cup
Runner-up	1974 West Germany
- * Club domestic league appearances and goals

Marinus Jacobus Hendricus "Rinus" Michels (Dutch pronunciation: [ˈrinʏs ˈmɪxəls]; 9 February 1928 – 3 March 2005) was a Dutch football player and coach. He played his entire career for Ajax, which he later managed, and played for and later managed the Netherlands national team for four spells. Throughout his career, he played as a forward. He is regarded as one of the greatest managers of all time.

Michels became most notable for his coaching achievements; he won the European Cup with Ajax and the Spanish league with Barcelona, and had four tenures as coach of the Netherlands national team, who he led to the final of the 1974 FIFA World Cup and to win UEFA Euro 1988.

He is credited with the invention of a major football playing style and set of tactics known as "Total Football" in the 1970s. He was named Coach of the Century by FIFA in 1999, in 2007 the greatest post-war football coach by The Times and in 2019 the greatest coach in the history of football by France Football.

== Playing career ==
=== Early life ===
Michels was born in Amsterdam and grew up at the Olympiaweg, a street near the Olympic Stadium. He celebrated his ninth birthday on 9 February 1937, when he received a pair of football boots and an Ajax jersey. Moments later, he was playing with his father at a small field near their home. Via Joop Köhler, a friend of the family who was commissioner at Ajax, Michels was introduced to the club and became a junior member in 1940. When World War II started, and especially during the Dutch famine of 1944–45, Michels' career was set on hold.

French club Lille had also wanted to sign Michels, but a playing career abroad did not materialize, as the Royal Netherlands Army did not allow him to go because he had to serve on active duty.

=== Ajax first team ===
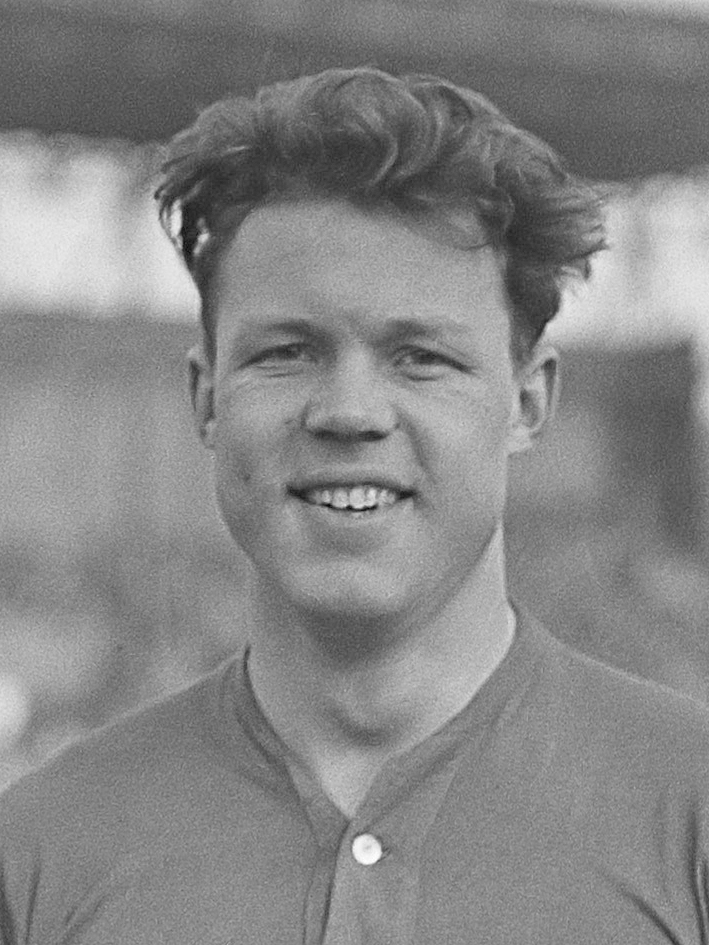
Michels in 1954

On 9 June 1946, Michels was invited into Ajax's first team squad to replace the injured Han Lambregt. In his debut, Ajax beat ADO 8–3, and Michels scored five times. That season, Ajax won their 14th division championship and a year later they won the Dutch national championship.

Although there were doubts about Michels' technical skills, team members like Cor van der Hart and captain Joop Stoffelen were enthusiastic about his strength and heading capabilities. Indeed, Michels was characterized for his hard work rather than for his technical qualities.

He went on to become a regular for the club, and between 1946 and 1958, he appeared in 264 league matches for Ajax, in which he scored 122 goals. In 1958, four years after the introduction of professional football in the Netherlands and one year after winning his second league title, he was forced to end his career due to a back injury.

=== National team ===
Michels' international playing career with the Netherlands national team lasted five matches, making his debut on 8 June 1950 away to Sweden, a 4–1 defeat. He also lost all of his remaining matches as an Oranje player, 4–1 to Finland, 4–0 to Belgium, 6–1 to Sweden and 3–1 to Switzerland.

== Coaching career ==
=== Early years in the Netherlands, Ajax, and Barcelona ===
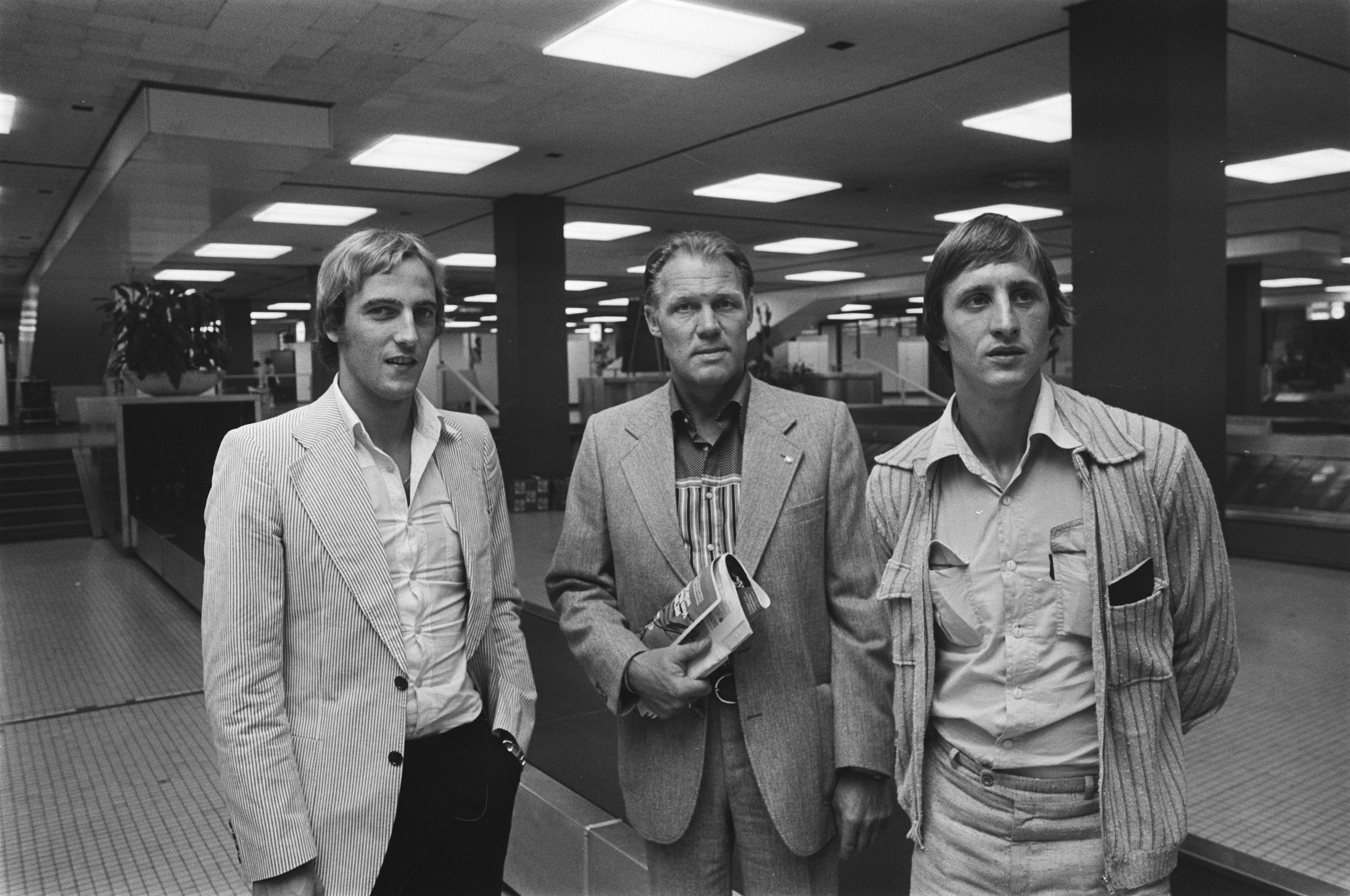
Three of the most notable figures of the Totaalvoetbal school: Johan Neeskens, Michels and Johan Cruyff

Michels returned to Ajax as head coach in 1965. Under his tenure and along with great players such as Johan Cruyff and Johan Neeskens, Ajax went from relegation candidates to a team that won the national championship four times and the KNVB Cup three times in the following six years. In 1969, they reached the final of the European Cup for the first time, being defeated 4–1 by Italian side Milan. In 1971, he managed Ajax to the first of three consecutive European Cups, a feat only achieved previously by the great Real Madrid team of Alfredo Di Stéfano and Ferenc Puskás. While at Ajax, Michels modernized the game by introducing what became known as "Total Football" and using the Offside trap. He then moved to Barcelona in the second part of 1971, being joined by Johan Cruyff in 1973. With Michels and Cruyff, the team won the Primera División title in 1974, before Michels became manager of the Dutch national team.

=== 1974 World Cup ===
Michels was appointed national coach by the Royal Dutch Football Association (KNVB) after the Netherlands had qualified for the 1974 FIFA World Cup. His first game as the Netherlands' coach was on 27 March 1974 in a 1–1 draw against Austria. At the finals tournament in West Germany, their third ever World Cup participation, the Dutch impressed many observers with their style of play which was backed up by their results; they won their first round group, then in the second round group they defeated Argentina and the defending world champions Brazil, and reached the final after five wins and one draw, with 14 goals scored and only one conceded in six matches. At that point, Michels was undefeated in nine matches as the Netherlands' coach. The Netherlands scored first against West Germany in the final, but the host team came back to defeat them 2–1, ending their run. That match was the last of Michels' first tenure in charge of the Dutch team, which he would return to coach ten years later.

=== Later years ===
Michels with the Los Angeles Aztecs in 1979

Michels later moved on to the United States where he coached in the ill-fated North American Soccer League. He ended his club coaching career with Bayer Leverkusen in 1989.

=== European champions ===
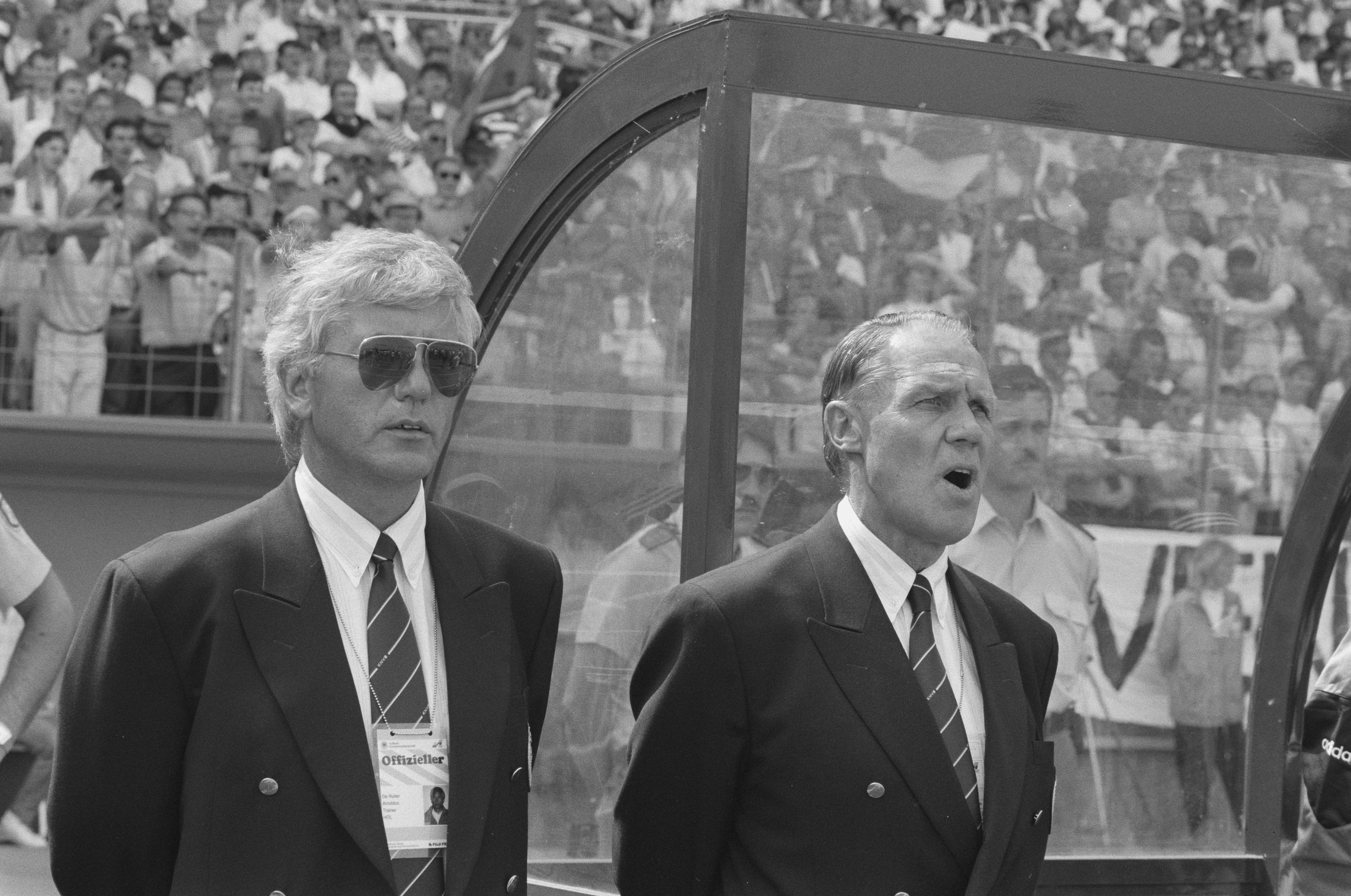
Michels (right) with his assistant manager Nol de Ruiter at UEFA Euro 1988

Michels returned to coach the team for the Euro 1988 tournament. After losing the first group match against the Soviet Union (1–0), the Netherlands went on to qualify for the semi-final by defeating England 3–1 (with a hat-trick by the tournament's top scorer Marco van Basten), and the Republic of Ireland (1–0). For many Dutch football supporters, the most important match in the tournament was the semi-final against West Germany, the host country, considered a revenge for the lost 1974 World Cup final (also in West Germany). Michels said after the match, "We won the tournament, but we all know that the semi-final was the real final." Van Basten, who would later become national team coach, scored in the 89th minute of the game to sink the German side. The game is also remembered for its post-match shenanigans, including Ronald Koeman, who, in front of the German supporters, provocatively pretended to wipe his backside with the shirt of Olaf Thon as if it were toilet paper, an action Koeman later did not regret. The Netherlands won the final with a convincing victory over the Soviet Union, a rematch on the round robin game, through a header by Ruud Gullit and a remarkable volley by Van Basten. This was the national team's first, and to date only, major tournament win and it restored them to the forefront of international football after almost a decade in the wilderness for almost three years to come.

== Personal life ==
Rinus Michels was married to Wil Hulsbosch; they didn't have kids together. Wil Michels died on 2 November 2003 shortly after suffering a stroke. Michels himself died on 3 March 2005 at a hospital in Aalst, Belgium, after a heart surgery in the hospital of Gareth, Spain (his second since 1986).

== Style of management, personality and legacy ==
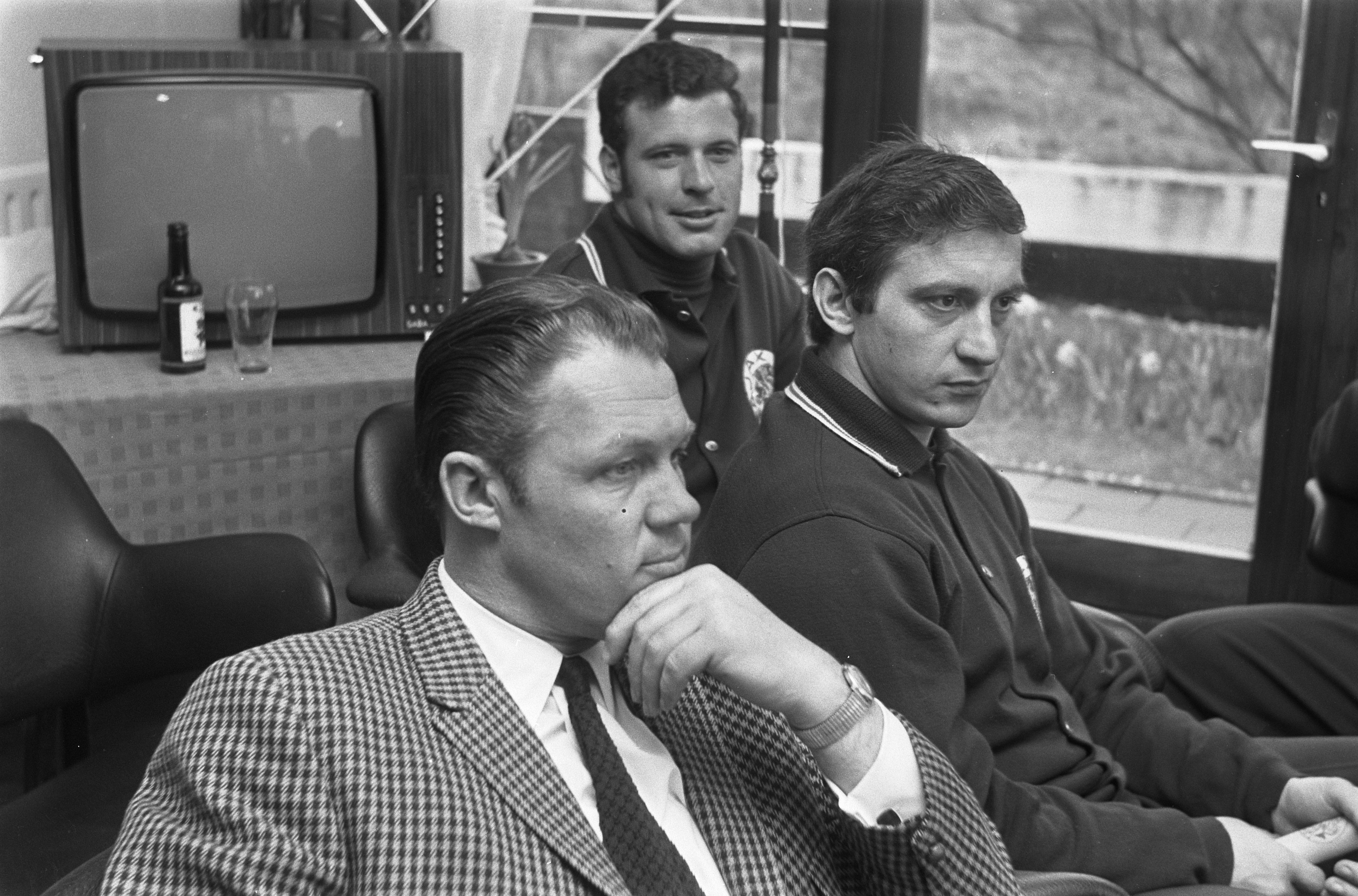
Rinus Michels with Velibor Vasović and Heinz Stuy in 1969

Regarded as one of the greatest managers of all time, Rinus Michels's tactics and Total Football philosophy were influenced by his time playing under English manager Jack Reynolds at Ajax, who had implemented a similar playing style with the club to great success in the 1940s. When Michels himself later became manager of Ajax in 1965, he further developed this style around the team's main forward Johan Cruyff. Although Cruyff was seemingly fielded as centre forward, Michels encouraged Cruyff to roam freely around the pitch, using his technical ability, creativity, and intelligence to exploit the weaknesses in the opposition and create space and chances in addition to scoring goals. Cruyff's teammates also supported him by playing him in a similar manner, regularly switching positions to ensure that the tactical roles in the team were consistently filled. This role has retroactively been compared to the "false 9" position in contemporary football. Michels's favoured formation was a fluid 4–3–3, which could become a 1–3–3–3 or 3–4–3.

The major component of Total Football was the use of space, and the need to consistently create it. Former Ajax defender Barry Hulshoff described it as "[the thing] we discussed the whole time. Cruyff always talked about where to run and where to stand, and when not to move". He further elaborated that position switching was only made possible due to apt spatial awareness. He also described Total Football being proactive, as well as highlighting the use of pressing, which would be used to win back the ball or put the opposition under considerable pressure. Another aspect of the system was the use of the offside trap. Under Michels's system, Ajax enjoyed a highly successful period, winning four Eredivisie titles, three KNVB Cups, and one European Cup.

The rise of Total Football and its attacking qualities were also linked with the demise of the more defensive–minded Catenaccio, a system reliant heavily on man-marking and counter–attacking, which was promoted most prominently by Italian sides Internazionale and Milan during the 1960s under Helenio Herrera and Nereo Rocco respectively. Unlike previous systems, in Total Football, no out–field player was fixed in their nominal role, which exposed weaknesses in the catenaccio tactical system; any player could assume the role of a forward, midfielder, or defender, at any given time depending on the circumstances. Due to players often switching positions with one another, man-marking strategies, such as catenaccio, were no longer effective at coping with this highly fluid tactical system. Despite previously losing out 4–1 to Milan in the 1969 European Cup Final, who were managed by Rocco, a manager known for his defensive catenaccio strategy, in 1971, Michels's Ajax won the European Cup Final, defeating Panathinaikos 2–0, using Total Football. The following year, Michels's successor at Ajax, Ștefan Kovács, continued to use Michels's Total Football philosophy, and defeated Inter 2–0 in the European Cup final; Dutch newspapers subsequently announced the "destruction of Catenaccio" at the hands of Total Football. The following year, Ajax defeated Cesare Maldini's Milan 6–0 in the second leg of the European Super Cup, in a match in which the defensive catenaccio system employed by Milan was unable to stop Ajax, which saw the Dutch side win the title 6–1 on aggregate; this was the worst defeat for an Italian team in an UEFA competition final.

Total Football also had some weaknesses, however, which were notably exploited in the final of the 1974 FIFA World Cup by West Germany. Michels and Cruyff saw their ability to introduce playmaking stifled in the second half of the match by the effective marking of Berti Vogts. This allowed Franz Beckenbauer, Uli Hoeneß, and Wolfgang Overath to gain a stronghold in midfield, thus, enabling West Germany to win 2–1. Moreover, as man-marking alone was insufficient to cope with the fluidity of Total Football, Italian coaches consequently began to create a new tactical system that mixed man-marking with zonal defence in order to counter this strategy, which came to be known as zona mista ("mixed zone," in Italian), or gioco all'italiana ("gameplay in the Italian manner," in Italian), in Italian football, as it mixed elements of Italian catenaccio (man-marking) with elements of Total Football (zonal marking), with Giovanni Trapattoni as one its main and most successful proponents from the 1970s onward.

Michels became known as someone keen on his money and did not want to spend much of it. A common joke in the Ajax changing rooms in those days was, "Does anybody know the color of Michels' wallet?". His IQ was high. During foreign trips he always brought a book with him, which he wanted to have read completely before coming home. He was known as someone who did not need anybody and who felt happy on his own, but sometimes he joined his teammates and shared their enthusiastic friendships. At the celebrations of Ajax' 50th birthday in 1950, he was the organizer of the humoristic show that was held and during traditional parties, he and his friend Hans Boskamp climbed up the stages to sing some duets. After matches, he was always soaping his hot body down in the showers of the changing rooms as well, even when the game was lost.

Michels was also known as a practical joker. At a hotel, he once borrowed a fur coat of a lady and pretended to be a lady to his teammates. During a training session in Lille, the players went fishing and Michels, who did not enjoy himself, jumped into the water.

Due to his authoritarian style as coach, Michels was called "The General". He said, "Professional football is something like war. Whoever behaves too properly, is lost." This has often been misquoted as "Football is war." Michels felt the quote was taken out of context as he did not intend to equate war with football. Michels was named coach of the century by FIFA in 1999. In 2007, he was named the greatest post-war football coach by The Times. In 2016, UEFA featured Michels among ten coaches recognised for their major impact on football since its foundation in 1954, describing him as the "architect of Total Football" and highlighting how the fluid, attacking style of his Ajax and Netherlands teams challenged the defensive football prevalent at the time. In 2019, he was listed as the greatest coach in the history of football by France Football.

The Rinus Michels Award, which rewards the best managers in Dutch football, is named in his honour.

== Career statistics ==
=== Club ===
Appearances and goals by club, season and competition
Club	Season	League		
Club	Season	Division	Apps	Goals
Ajax	1945–46	Football League Championship	12	13
Ajax	1946–47	Football League Championship	28	14
Ajax	1947–48	Football League Championship	5	3
Ajax	1948–49	Football League Championship	20	7
Ajax	1949–50	Football League Championship	26	16
Ajax	1950–51	Football League Championship	14	5
Ajax	1951–52	Football League Championship	19	15
Ajax	1952–53	Football League Championship	20	8
Ajax	1953–54	Football League Championship	26	12
Ajax	1954–55	Football League Championship	33	14
Ajax	1955–56	Football League Championship	30	8
Ajax	1956–57	Eredivisie	29	7
Ajax	1957–58	Eredivisie	2	0
Career total			264	122

=== International ===
Appearances and goals by national team and year
National team	Year	Apps	Goals
Netherlands	1950	2	0
Netherlands	1951	0	0
Netherlands	1952	0	0
Netherlands	1953	0	0
Netherlands	1954	3	0
Total		5	0

== Managerial statistics ==
Managerial record by team and tenure
Team	From	To	Record				
Team	From	To	P	W	D	L	Win %
Ajax	22 January 1965	30 June 1971	288	207	41	40	71.88
Barcelona	1 July 1971	30 June 1975	174	88	43	43	50.57
Netherlands	27 March 1974	7 July 1974	10	6	3	1	60.00
Ajax	1 July 1975	30 June 1976	43	27	8	8	62.79
Barcelona	1 July 1976	30 June 1978	94	47	25	22	50.00
Los Angeles Aztecs	1 July 1978	13 October 1980	72	42	1	29	58.33
1. FC Köln	14 October 1980	23 August 1983	116	58	26	32	50.00
Netherlands	14 November 1984	23 December 1984	2	1	0	1	50.00
Netherlands	29 April 1986	25 June 1988	22	12	6	4	54.55
Bayer Leverkusen	1 July 1988	13 April 1989	31	10	11	10	32.26
Netherlands	26 September 1990	22 June 1992	19	11	4	4	57.89
Total			871	509	168	194	58.44

=== Netherlands ===
Team	Record							
Team	P	W	D	L	GF	GA	GD	Win %
Netherlands	53	30	13	10	98	32	+66	56.60

== Honours ==
=== Player ===
Ajax

- Netherlands Football League Championship/Eredivisie: 1946–47, 1956–57

=== Manager ===
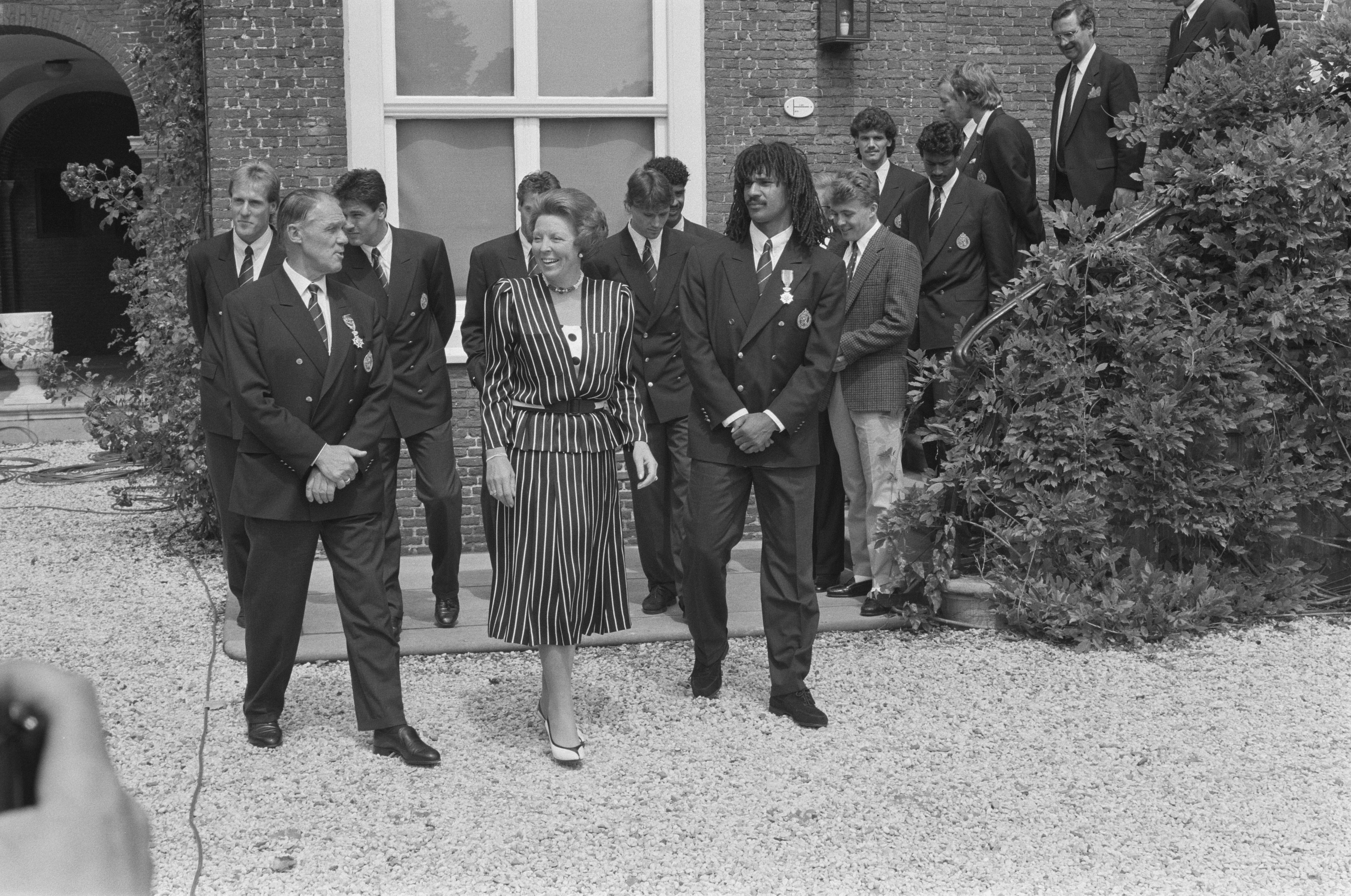
Michels with Queen Beatrix and the Dutch team after winning Euro '88.

Ajax

- Eredivisie: 1965–66, 1966–67, 1967–68, 1969–70
- KNVB Cup: 1966–67, 1969–70, 1970–71
- European Cup: 1970–71; runner-up: 1968–69

Barcelona

- La Liga: 1973–74
- Copa del Rey: 1977–78
- Inter-Cities Fairs Cup Trophy: 1971

1. FC Köln

- DFB Pokal: 1982–83

Netherlands

- UEFA European Championship: 1988
- FIFA World Cup runner-up: 1974

Individual

- World Soccer Awards Manager of the Year: 1988
- FIFA Coach of the Century: 1999
- France Football Greatest Manager of All time: 2019
- World Soccer 2nd Greatest Manager of All Time: 2013
- ESPN 2nd Greatest Manager of All Time: 2013
- FourFourTwo 2nd Greatest Manager of All Time: 2023
- Dutch Manager of the Century: 1999
- UEFA Lifetime Award: 2002
- Best Manager in 50 years of professional football in the Netherlands: 2004

Orders

- Invested as a Knight of the Order of Orange-Nassau: 1974
- Elevated as an Officer of the Order of Orange-Nassau: 1988
- Named Knight of the KNVB: 2002
