= Abe Lenstra =

Dutch footballer (1920–1985)

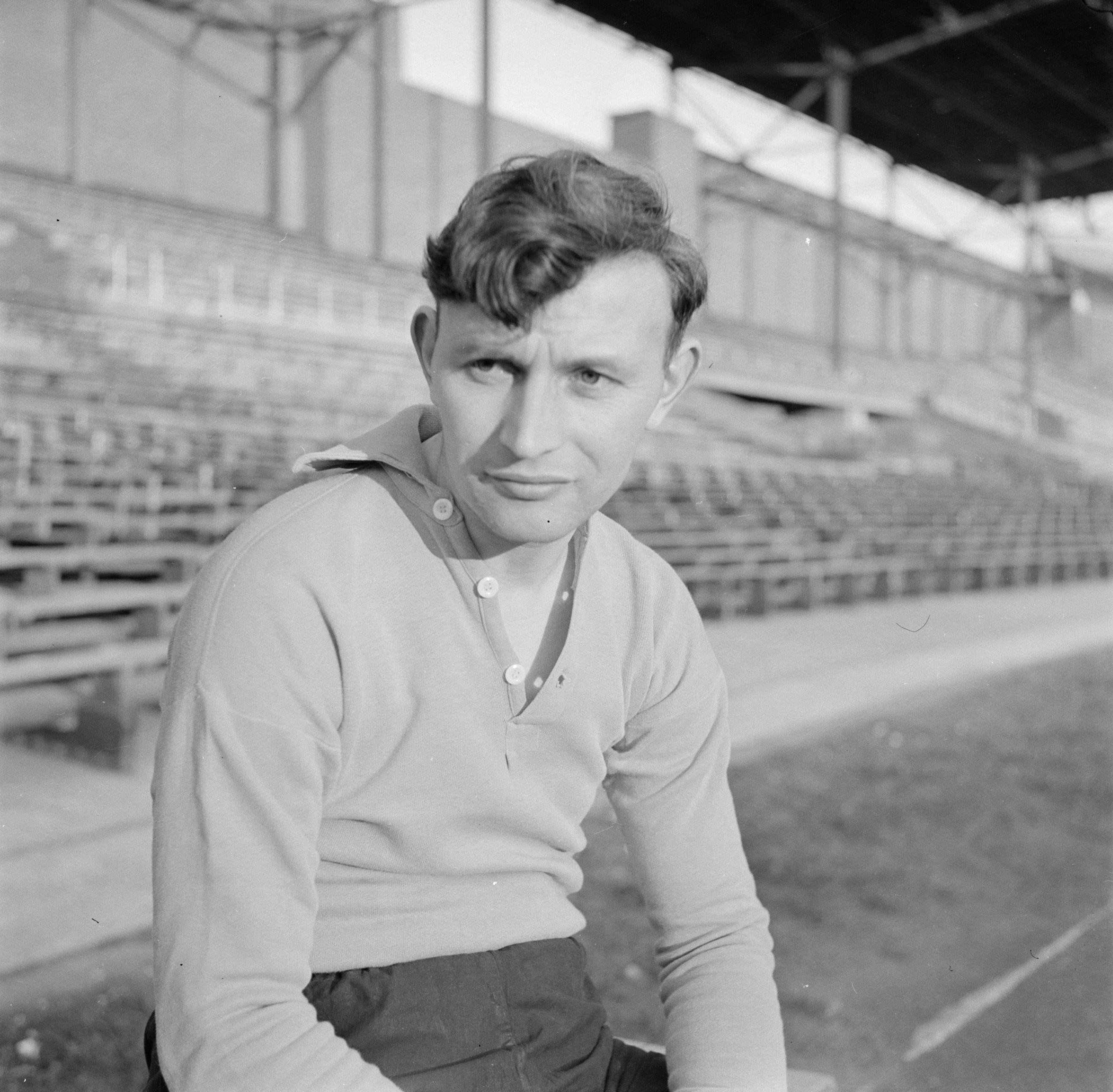
- Lenstra in 1951

Personal information
- Full name: Abe Minderts Lenstra
- Date of birth: 27 November 1920
- Place of birth: Heerenveen, Netherlands
- Date of death: 2 September 1985 (aged 64)
- Place of death: Heerenveen, Netherlands
- Position: Forward

Senior career*
Years	Team	Apps	(Gls)
1936–1955	Heerenveen	395	(471)
1955–1960	SC Enschede	107	(65)
1960–1963	Enschedese Boys	88	(40)
Total		590	(576)

International career
1940–1959	Netherlands	47	(33)

Managerial career
- 1946–1947: Heerenveen (player-coach)
- * Club domestic league appearances and goals

Abe Minderts Lenstra (Dutch pronunciation: [ˈaːbə ˈmɪndərts ˈlɛnstraː]; 27 November 1920 – 2 September 1985) was a Dutch footballer and national football icon in the 1950s who played as a forward. He is regarded as one of the greatest players ever to hail from the Netherlands. He was also a Frisian legend, most notably with the club where he made his name as a football player, Heerenveen. Known for his exceptional dribbling skills, creativity, and goal-scoring ability, Lenstra was considered one of the best forwards of his generation. He earned 47 caps for the Netherlands national team, scoring 33 goals, and played a crucial role in the team's success during his era. In addition to his national fame, Lenstra was beloved in Friesland, where his contributions to both Heerenveen and regional football left a lasting legacy.

Abe Lenstra's arguably greatest performance came in a match between Heerenveen and Ajax, where his team was losing 5–1 (3–1 at halftime). Lenstra led a stunning comeback, scoring multiple goals to secure a 6–5 victory by the end of the second half. This game is often remembered as a testament to his exceptional skill and leadership on the pitch. His talent was recognized internationally, with Serie A clubs, including Fiorentina, showing interest in signing him during a time when players rarely left their home countries due to the aftermath of World War II. Over the course of his career, Lenstra scored more than 500 goals, a feat achieved by only a handful of players in football history, cementing his legacy as one of the sport's greats.

== Early life ==
Abe Lenstra's football journey began on the streets of Heerenveen, where he honed his skills playing informal games. He also played for his school football team, showcasing his early talent. At the age of 12, Syd Castle, the Scottish coach of FF Heerenveen, sought permission from Lenstra's father to allow him to join the club's youth setup. In 1936, at just 15 years old, Lenstra joined the club's top team. His first appearance for Heerenveen came alongside his older brother, Jan, in the club’s second team. On 1 March 1936, they played against Alcides from Meppel, with Abe scoring three goals and Jan scoring six, but despite the impressive performance, Abe missed out on a move to the first team.

== Career ==
Abe Lenstra's football career spanned several clubs, including SC Enschede, Enschedese Boys, PH: DOS '19, WSV, DOS Kampen and vv LTC. However, it was at VV Heerenveen (the previous name of current day SC Heerenveen) where he gained national prominence and earned a spot on the Dutch national team. Lenstra made his debut for Heerenveen on 16 July 1936, during a tournament featuring clubs from Gorredijk, Noordwolde, Drachten, and Heerenveen. In his first match for the club against Gorredijk, which ended in a 2–2 draw, Lenstra scored a goal that Hepkema's Courant described as a "wonderful goal." Lenstra's most notable performances were with Heerenveen, including his legendary comeback performance against Ajax in 1950, where his team was trailing 5–1 at halftime, only to win 6–5 by the end of the match. This incredible performance solidified his status as one of the Netherlands' footballing icons. In 1954, when professional football was introduced in the Netherlands, the already 34-year-old Abe Lenstra made the move from VV Heerenveen to the much larger SC Enschede. Despite his skill, he narrowly missed out on winning the Eredivisie title when Enschede lost the 1958 final to DOS Utrecht after 180 minutes of play. In 1960, he made the move to the rivals Enschedese Boys, where he ended his professional career in 1963.

Abe Lenstra became the first Friesian footballer to play for the Netherlands national team on 31 March 1940, at just 19 years old, in a 5–4 loss to Luxembourg, where he scored a goal. Over his international career, he earned 47 caps and scored 33 goals, forming key partnerships with players like Faas Wilkes and Kees Rijvers. Lenstra was known for standing by his principles, refusing to play for the national team if not selected for his preferred position. Together with Wilkes and Rijvers, Lenstra formed the renowned Gouden Binnentrio (The Golden Inner Three) of the Dutch national team between the late 1940s and 1950s; though the three only played together in ten matches (of which they lost one), they scored 23 goals.

It was Lenstra who put the name of SC Heerenveen on the footballing map, and the club became affectionately known as "Abeveen" in his honour. Long after his retirement, in 1977, he was diagnosed with a brain hemorrhage, which left him using a wheelchair for the remainder of his life. Lenstra died in 1985, just a few days before the first-ever international match was played at the stadium that would be named after him a year later.

== Legacy ==
Today, his name has been closely associated with SC Heerenveen and its stadium: The Abe Lenstra Stadion has been named in his honour as a lasting memorial.

== Career statistics ==
=== Club ===
Appearances and goals by club, season, and competition. Only official games are included in this table.
Club	Season	League		League Play-Off		KNVB Cup		Total	
Club	Season	Apps	Goals	Apps	Goals	Apps	Goals	Apps	Goals
Heerenveen	1936–37	18	20	4	2	–		22	22
Heerenveen	1937–38	17	13	0	0	4	11	21	24
Heerenveen	1938–39	18	25	0	0	1	0	19	25
Heerenveen	1939–40	16	21	0	0	–		16	21
Heerenveen	1940–41	14	20	0	0	–		14	20
Heerenveen	1941–42	17	32	8	6	–		25	38
Heerenveen	1942–43	18	27	7	7	–		25	34
Heerenveen	1943–44	16	19	8	3	–		24	22
Heerenveen	1944–45	–		–		–		0	0
Heerenveen	1945–46	19	18	9	7	1	1	29	26
Heerenveen	1946–47	19	30	10	15	–		39	45
Heerenveen	1947–48	20	28	10	13	–		30	41
Heerenveen	1948–49	18	21	10	12	–		28	33
Heerenveen	1949–50	17	30	10	5	–		27	35
Heerenveen	1950–51	21	29	4	1	–		25	30
Heerenveen	1951–52	26	29	0	0	–		26	29
Heerenveen	1952–53	26	19	0	0	–		26	19
Heerenveen	1953–54	25	24	0	0	–		25	24
Heerenveen	1954–55	34	28	0	0	–		34	28
SC Enschede	1955–56	33	25	0	0	–		33	25
SC Enschede	1956–57	30	17	–		–		30	17
SC Enschede	1957–58	21	11	–		–		21	11
SC Enschede	1958–59	27	18	–		–		27	18
SC Enschede	1959–60	25	15	–		–		25	15
Enschedese Boys	1960–61	27	13	–		4	3	31	16
Enschedese Boys	1961–62	33	20	–		1	2	34	22
Enschedese Boys	1962–63	23	7	–		1	1	24	8
Total		578	559	80	71	12	18	680	648

=== International ===
Scores and results list Netherlands's goal tally first, score column indicates score after each Lenstra goal.

List of international goals scored by Abe Lenstra
No.	Date	Venue	Opponent	Score	Result	Competition	Ref.
1	31 March 1940	De Kuip, Rotterdam, Netherlands	Luxembourg	1–0	4–5	Friendly	
2	21 September 1947	Olympic Stadium, Amsterdam, Netherlands	Switzerland	1–0	6–2	Friendly	
3	14 March 1948	Bosuilstadion, Antwerp, Belgium	Belgium	1–0	1–1	Friendly	
4	18 April 1948	De Kuip, Rotterdam, Netherlands	Belgium	2–2	2–2	Friendly	
5	13 March 1949	Olympic Stadium, Amsterdam, Netherlands	Belgium	—	3–3	Friendly	
6	12 June 1949	Københavns Idrætspark, Copenhagen, Denmark	Denmark	1–0	2–1	Friendly	
7	11 June 1950	Helsinki Olympic Stadium, Helsinki, Finland	Finland	1–3	1–4	Friendly	
8	15 April 1951	Olympic Stadium, Amsterdam, Netherlands	Belgium	4–3	5–4	Friendly	
9	15 April 1951	Olympic Stadium, Amsterdam, Netherlands	Belgium	5–3	5–4	Friendly	
10	6 June 1951	De Kuip, Rotterdam, Netherlands	Norway	2–2	2–3	Friendly	
11	27 October 1951	De Kuip, Rotterdam, Netherlands	Finland	1–0	4–4	Friendly	
12	25 November 1951	De Kuip, Rotterdam, Netherlands	Belgium	1–2	6–7	Friendly	
13	25 November 1951	De Kuip, Rotterdam, Netherlands	Belgium	3–3	6–7	Friendly	
14	25 November 1951	De Kuip, Rotterdam, Netherlands	Belgium	4–4	6–7	Friendly	
15	21 September 1952	Københavns Idrætspark, Copenhagen, Denmark	Denmark	2–0	2–3	Friendly	
16	19 October 1952	Bosuilstadion, Antwerp, Belgium	Belgium	—	1–2	Friendly	
17	7 March 1953	De Kuip, Rotterdam, Netherlands	Denmark	1–2	1–2	Friendly	
18	22 March 1953	Olympic Stadium, Amsterdam, Netherlands	Switzerland	1–1	1–2	Friendly	
19	13 March 1955	Olympic Stadium, Amsterdam, Netherlands	Denmark	1–1	1–1	Friendly	
20	14 March 1956	Rheinstadion, Düsseldorf, Germany	West Germany	1–0	2–1	Friendly	
21	14 March 1956	Rheinstadion, Düsseldorf, Germany	West Germany	2–0	2–1	Friendly	
22	6 June 1956	Olympic Stadium, Amsterdam, Netherlands	Saar	2–0	3–2	Friendly	
23	15 September 1956	Stade Olympique de la Pontaise, Lausanne, Switzerland	Switzerland	1–0	3–2	Friendly	
24	11 September 1957	De Kuip, Rotterdam, Netherlands	Luxembourg	1–1	5–2	1958 FIFA World Cup qualification	
25	11 September 1957	De Kuip, Rotterdam, Netherlands	Luxembourg	3–1	5–2	1958 FIFA World Cup qualification	
26	25 September 1957	Olympic Stadium, Amsterdam, Netherlands	Austria	1–1	1–1	1958 FIFA World Cup qualification	
27	13 April 1958	Bosuilstadion, Antwerp, Belgium	Belgium	1–0	7–2	Friendly	
28	13 April 1958	Bosuilstadion, Antwerp, Belgium	Belgium	4–0	7–2	Friendly	
29	23 April 1948	De Kuip, Rotterdam, Netherlands	Netherlands Antilles	4–0	8–1	Friendly	
30	23 April 1948	De Kuip, Rotterdam, Netherlands	Netherlands Antilles	8–0	8–1	Friendly	
31	15 October 1958	De Kuip, Rotterdam, Netherlands	Denmark	4–0	5–1	Friendly	
32	15 October 1958	De Kuip, Rotterdam, Netherlands	Denmark	5–1	5–1	Friendly	
33	19 April 1959	Olympic Stadium, Amsterdam, Netherlands	Belgium	1–2	2–2	Friendly	

== Honours ==
Heerenveen

- Northern First Division: 1941–42, 1942–43, 1943–44, 1945–46, 1946–47, 1947–48, 1948–49, 1949–50, 1950–51
- Netherlands Football League Championship Runner-up: 1946–47, 1947–48

SC Enschede

- Eredivisie Runner-up: 1957–58

Individual

- Netherlands national team all-time top scorer: 1958–1959
- Dutch Sportsman of the Year: 1951, 1952
- Netherlands Football League Championship top scorer: 1946–47, 1947–48

== See also ==
- List of men's footballers with 500 or more goals

Awards
Preceded by None	Dutch Sporter of the Year; 1951 to 1952	Succeeded by Arie van Vliet
