= SC Heerenveen in European football =

- Club: SC Heerenveen
- Seasons played: 15
- Top scorer: Gerald Sibon (11)
- First entry: 1995 Intertoto Cup
- Latest entry: 2012-13 Europa League

SC Heerenveen in European football includes the games which are played by SC Heerenveen in competitions organized by UEFA.

== History ==
=== 1990s: European Debut and Intertoto Cup Runs ===
SC Heerenveen made their European debut in the 1995 UEFA Intertoto Cup, reaching the quarter-finals before losing to Bordeaux. They participated in subsequent Intertoto Cups in 1996 and 1997 but did not progress past the group stages.

In the 1998–99 UEFA Cup Winners' Cup, SC Heerenveen advanced to the second round, defeating Amica Wronki before being eliminated by Varteks. In 1999, they reached the semi-finals of the Intertoto Cup, losing to West Ham United F.C..

=== 2000s: Champions League Group Stage and UEFA Cup Consistency ===
The 2000–01 season marked SC Heerenveen's first and only appearance in the UEFA Champions League group stage, where they faced Valencia CF, Olympique Lyonnais, and Olympiacos F.C., finishing fourth in their group.

Throughout the decade, they regularly competed in the UEFA Cup (now Europa League), with notable performances including reaching the round of 32 in the 2004–05 and 2005–06 seasons. In the 2008–09 UEFA Cup, SC Heerenveen participated in the group stage but did not advance further.

=== 2010s: Decline in European Appearances ===
SC Heerenveen's European appearances became less frequent in this decade. In the 2009–10 UEFA Europa League, they reached the group stage but did not progress. Their last notable European participation was in the 2012-13 Europa League, where they were eliminated in the play-off round by Molde FK.

== Totals ==
Competition	Participations	Games	Won	Draw	Lost	Goals scored	Goals conceded
UEFA Champions League	1	6	1	1	4	3	9
UEFA Europa League	2	12	3	4	5	17	13
UEFA Cup Winners' Cup	1	4	3	0	1	8	6
UEFA Cup	6	31	11	6	14	44	48
UEFA Intertoto Cup	5	24	11	3	10	41	20
Total	15	77	29	14	34	113	96

== Top scorers ==
#	Goals	Name	Last score	Tournament
1	11	(Netherlands) Gerald Sibon	16 Dec 2009	Europa League
2	6	(Serbia) Radoslav Samardžić	24 Jul 1999	Intertoto Cup
3	5	(Netherlands) Arnold Bruggink	23 Feb 2006	UEFA Cup
3	5	(Netherlands) Erik Regtop	29 Jul 1995	Intertoto Cup
3	5	(Netherlands) Erik Tammer	15 Jul 1995	Intertoto Cup
3	5	(Netherlands) Jeffrey Talan	12 Sep 2000	Champions League
3	5	(Netherlands) Klaas-Jan Huntelaar	29 Sep 2005	UEFA Cup
8	4	(Sweden) Mika Väyrynen	16 Dec 2009	Europa League
8	4	(Netherlands) Uğur Yıldırım	29 Sep 2005	UEFA Cup
10	3	(Brazil) Afonso Alves	14 Dec 2006	UEFA Cup
10	3	(Greece) Georgios Samaras	14 Dec 2005	UEFA Cup
10	3	(Netherlands) Johan Hansma	14 Dec 2005	UEFA Cup
10	3	(Denmark) Jon Dahl Tomasson	13 Jul 1996	Intertoto Cup
10	3	(Netherlands) Romeo Wouden	20 Jul 1996	Intertoto Cup
10	3	(Morocco) Tarik Elyounoussi	2 Oct 2008	UEFA Cup

== Competitions by Countries ==
	Country	Games	Won	Draw	Lost	Goals Scored	Goals Against	Opponents
1	Portugal	9	2	3	4	15	14	S.C. Braga (1), S.L. Benfica (1), Sporting CP (2), U.D. Leiria (1), Vitória F.C. (4)
2	Romania	8	4	1	3	12	7	FC Dinamo București (1), FC Național București (2), FC Rapid București (2), FC Steaua București (2), FCV Farul Constanța (1)
3	France	6	1	0	5	3	11	FC Girondins de Bordeaux (1), FC Nantes (1), Olympique de Marseille (1), Olympique Lyonnais (2), RC Lens (1)
4	England	5	0	0	5	2	9	Newcastle United F.C. (2), Portsmouth F.C. (1), West Ham United F.C. (2)
4	Germany	5	2	0	3	5	10	Hertha BSC (2), MSV Duisburg (1), VfB Stuttgart (1), VfL Wolfsburg (1)
4	Spain	5	0	3	2	2	4	CA Osasuna (1), Valencia CF (2), Villarreal CF (2)
7	Greece	4	1	2	1	2	3	Olympiacos F.C. (2), PAOK FC (2)
7	Sweden	4	3	0	1	10	8	Hammarby Fotboll (2), Helsingborgs IF (2)
9	Belgium	3	3	0	0	6	1	K.S.K. Beveren (2), Lierse S.K. (1)
9	Croatia	3	1	1	1	6	7	GNK Dinamo Zagreb (1), Varteks (2)
9	Denmark	3	2	0	1	10	5	Aalborg (1), Næstved Boldklub (1), Odense Boldklub (1)
9	Norway	3	0	0	3	1	5	Lillestrøm SK (1), Molde FK (2)
9	Poland	3	2	1	0	4	1	Amica Wronki (2), Polonia Warsaw (1)
14	Czech Republic	2	1	0	1	5	2	FC Baník Ostrava (2)
14	Italy	2	0	0	2	2	5	A.C. Milan (1), Parma (1)
14	Latvia	2	1	1	0	5	0	FK Ventspils (2)
14	Slovenia	2	1	0	1	2	1	FC Koper (2)
18	Belarus	1	0	0	1	0	1	FC Dinamo-93 Minsk (1)
18	Bulgaria	1	1	0	0	2	1	PFC Levski Sofia (1)
18	Hungary	1	1	0	0	4	0	Békéscsaba 1912 Előre (1)
18	(Republic of Ireland) Ireland	1	0	1	0	0	0	Sligo Rovers F.C. (1)
18	Israel	1	1	0	0	5	0	Maccabi Petah Tikva F.C. (1)
18	Lithuania	1	1	0	0	3	1	FBK Kaunas (1)
18	Russia	1	0	1	0	0	0	PFC CSKA Moscow (1)
18	Wales	1	1	0	0	7	0	Ton Pentre F.C. (1)

== Most Played Team ==
Rank	Team	Country	Games	Won	Draw	Lost	Goals Scored	Goals Against
1	Vitória F.C.	Portugal	4	2	2	0	9	3

== European match history ==
As of 30 August 2012

Competition	Round	Opponent	Home	Away	Aggregate
1995 Intertoto Cup	Group stage	(Denmark) Næstved Boldklub	2–1	—N/a	1st
1995 Intertoto Cup	Group stage	(Wales) Ton Pentre F.C.	—N/a	7-0	1st
1995 Intertoto Cup	Group stage	(Hungary) Békéscsaba 1912 Előre	4–0	—N/a	1st
1995 Intertoto Cup	Group stage	(Portugal) U.D. Leiria	—N/a	0–1	1st
1995 Intertoto Cup	Round of 16	(Romania) FCV Farul Constanța	4–0		
1995 Intertoto Cup	Quarter final	(France) FC Girondins de Bordeaux	0–1		
1996 Intertoto Cup	Group stage	(Republic of Ireland) Sligo Rovers F.C.	—N/a	0–0	3rd
1996 Intertoto Cup	Group stage	(Norway) Lillestrøm SK	0–1	—N/a	3rd
1996 Intertoto Cup	Group stage	(France) FC Nantes	—N/a	1–3	3rd
1996 Intertoto Cup	Group stage	(Lithuania) FBK Kaunas	3-1	—N/a	3rd
1997 Intertoto Cup	Group stage	(Belarus) FC Dinamo-93 Minsk	—N/a	0–1	4th
1997 Intertoto Cup	Group stage	(Poland) Polonia Warsaw	0–0	—N/a	4th
1997 Intertoto Cup	Group stage	(Germany) MSV Duisburg	—N/a	0–2	4th
1997 Intertoto Cup	Group stage	(Denmark) AaB	8-2	—N/a	4th
1998–99 Cup Winners' Cup	First round	(Poland) Amica Wronki	3–1	1–0	4–1
1998–99 Cup Winners' Cup	Second round	(Croatia) Varteks	2–1	2–4 (a.e.t.)	4–5
1999 Intertoto Cup	First round	(Sweden) Hammarby Fotboll	2–0	2–0	4–0
1999 Intertoto Cup	Second round	(England) West Ham United F.C.	0–1	0–1	0–2
2000–01 Champions League	Group stage	(France) Olympique Lyonnais	0–2	1–3	4th
2000–01 Champions League	Group stage	(Spain) Valencia CF	0–1	1–1	4th
2000–01 Champions League	Group stage	(Greece) Olympiacos F.C.	1–0	0–2	4th
2002–03 UEFA Cup	First round	(Romania) National București	2–0	0–3	2–3
2003 Intertoto Cup	First round	(Belgium) Lierse S.K.	4–1	1–0	5–1
2003 Intertoto Cup	Semi-finals	(Slovenia) FC Koper	2–0	0–1	2–1
2003 Intertoto Cup	Finals	(Spain) Villarreal CF	1–2	0–0	1–2
2004–05 UEFA Cup	First round	(Israel) Maccabi Petah Tikva F.C.	5–0	Cancelled (Note: Due to a general strike in Israel, the first leg was cancelled by UEFA)	5–0
2004–05 UEFA Cup	Group stage	(Portugal) S.L. Benfica	—N/a	2–4	3rd
2004–05 UEFA Cup	Group stage	(Germany) VfB Stuttgart	2–0	—N/a	3rd
2004–05 UEFA Cup	Group stage	(Croatia) GNK Dinamo Zagreb	—N/a	2–2	3rd
2004–05 UEFA Cup	Group stage	(Belgium) K.S.K. Beveren	1–0	—N/a	3rd
2004–05 UEFA Cup	Round of 32	(England) Newcastle United F.C.	1–2	1–2	2–4
2005–06 UEFA Cup	First round	(Czech Republic) FC Baník Ostrava	5–0	0–2	5–2
2005–06 UEFA Cup	Group stage	(Romania) FC Dinamo București	—N/a	0–0	3rd
2005–06 UEFA Cup	Group stage	(Russia) PFC CSKA Moscow	0–0	—N/a	3rd
2005–06 UEFA Cup	Group stage	(France) Olympique de Marseille	—N/a	0–1	3rd
2005–06 UEFA Cup	Group stage	(Bulgaria) PFC Levski Sofia	2–1	—N/a	3rd
2005–06 UEFA Cup	Round of 32	(Romania) FC Steaua București	1–3	1–0	2–3
2006–07 UEFA Cup	First round	(Portugal) Vitória F.C.	0-0	3-0	3–0
2006–07 UEFA Cup	Group stage	(Spain) CA Osasuna	—N/a	0-0	5th
2006–07 UEFA Cup	Group stage	(Denmark) Odense Boldklub	0-1	—N/a	5th
2006–07 UEFA Cup	Group stage	(Italy) Parma	—N/a	1-2	5th
2006–07 UEFA Cup	Group stage	(France) RC Lens	1-0	—N/a	5th
2007–08 UEFA Cup	First round	(Sweden) Helsingborgs IF	5–3	1–5	6–8
2008–09 UEFA Cup	First round	(Portugal) Vitória F.C.	5–2	1–1	6–3
2008–09 UEFA Cup	Group stage	(Italy) A.C. Milan	1–3	—N/a	5th
2008–09 UEFA Cup	Group stage	(Germany) VfL Wolfsburg	—N/a	1–5	5th
2008–09 UEFA Cup	Group stage	(Portugal) S.C. Braga	1–2	—N/a	5th
2008–09 UEFA Cup	Group stage	(England) Portsmouth F.C.	—N/a	0–3	5th
2009-10 Europa League	Playoff round	(Greece) PAOK FC	0–0	1–1	1–1 (a)
2009-10 Europa League	Group stage	(Portugal) Sporting CP	2–3	1–1	3rd
2009-10 Europa League	Group stage	(Latvia) FK Ventspils	5–0	0–0	3rd
2009-10 Europa League	Group stage	(Germany) Hertha BSC	2–3	1–0	3rd
2012-13 Europa League	3rd qualifying round	(Romania) FC Rapid București	4–0	0–1	4–1
2012-13 Europa League	Play-off round	(Norway) Molde FK	1–2	0–2	1–4
