= SC Heerenveen =

Dutch professional football club

Heerenveen
- Full name: Sportclub Heerenveen
- Nickname: De Superfriezen (The Super Frisians)
- Founded: 20 July 1920; 106 years ago
- Ground: Abe Lenstra Stadion
- Capacity: 26,100
- Chairman: Dennis Gijsman
- Head coach: Robin Veldman
- League: Eredivisie
- 2025–26: Eredivisie, 8th of 18
- Website: sc-heerenveen.nl
Home colours	Away colours

Sportclub Heerenveen (Dutch pronunciation: [ˈspɔrtklʏp ˌɦeːrə(ɱ)ˈveːn]; West Frisian: Sportklub It Hearrenfean) is a Dutch professional football club from Heerenveen. They currently play in the Eredivisie, the top level of football in the Netherlands. The club is known for its Frisian identity.

== History ==
Sportclub Heerenveen was founded on 20 July 1920 in the town of Heerenveen, Friesland, as Athleta. It changed name twice, first to Spartaan and then to v.v. Heerenveen in 1922. While the Netherlands was occupied by Germany, Heerenveen won three successive North of the Netherlands championships, and following the end of World War II it went on to win the same title six times in a row; the club's dominance partly ascribed to the presence of Abe Lenstra. During this period, Lenstra led Heerenveen to a famous victory over Ajax in one of the most noted games in Dutch domestic football history. Trailing 5–1 with 25 minutes remaining, the Frisian team inexplicably fought back for a 6–5 victory.

During the 1950s, Heerenveen regional dominance faded and after Dutch football turned professional Lenstra left to join Sportclub Enschede, before the club he departed was relegated to the Tweede Divisie. By the end of the decade, Heerenveen was in the Eerste Divisie, but found itself relegated again. In 1969–70, the Frisian club won the Tweede Divisie to return to the Eerste Divisie and for two seasons in the 1970s, the club was close to achieving promotion to the top-flight Eredivisie. By 1974, the club was in financial trouble and to ensure its survival it was split into amateur and professional sections on 1 June 1977, the professional part being renamed sc Heerenveen.

In the 1980s, Heerenveen twice made the promotion playoffs, but were unsuccessful both times. It finally reached the Eredivisie in 1990, becoming the first Frisian club to reach the top level, at the expense of near-neighbours Cambuur. The achievement was overseen by Frisian coach Foppe de Haan. Heerenveen's first season in the Netherlands' top division was not at all successful and it was relegated, before returning in 1993, though they reached the final of the KNVB Cup while still an Eerste Divisie club. Having established itself as a top-flight club, Heerenveen moved to a new stadium, named after their most celebrated player, the Abe Lenstra Stadion, and reached the final of the KNVB Cup for a second time. The 1998 semi-final in the cup competition was lost to Ajax. Because Ajax and the other finalist, PSV, had both qualified for the cup final, a decision match was needed to fill in the vacant spot for the next season's UEFA Cup Winners' Cup. Heerenveen had to play against the other losing semi-finalist, Twente. Heerenveen won that match in which Ruud van Nistelrooy scored his last goal for Heerenveen. The match ended 3–1.

Heerenveen became regular competitors in the UEFA Cup, and in 1999–2000 finished second in the Eredivisie, its highest ever finish, and qualified for the 2000–01 UEFA Champions League.

The club was led from 1983 until September 2006 by president Riemer van der Velde, the longest tenure of any president with a professional club in the Netherlands. As the results of recent transfers that include Klaas-Jan Huntelaar, Afonso Alves, Michael Bradley, Miralem Sulejmani, Petter Hansson and Danijel Pranjić (and earlier players like Jon Dahl Tomasson, Marcus Allbäck, Erik Edman, Ruud van Nistelrooy, Igor Korneev and Daniel Jensen), Heerenveen is one of the most financially secure Eredivisie clubs. A 2010 report by the Dutch football association showed that Heerenveen is the only Eredivisie club that has a financially secure budget. Under the tenure of Trond Sollied, Heerenveen won its first KNVB Cup, also its first ever major trophy. Trond Sollied, however, was sacked on 31 August 2009 due to a weak opening of the season and a conflict with the board.

On 17 May 2009, the club defeated Twente 5–4 in a penalty shoot-out to win the Dutch Cup for the first time after a 2–2 draw in the final, with Gerald Sibon scoring the winning penalty. On 13 February 2012, it was announced that Marco van Basten would replace Ron Jans, who had led Heerenveen for two years, as team manager for the 2012–13 season.. Van Basten would lead Heerenveen to an 8th place finish in his first season and a 5th place finish in the 13 - 14 season, missing out on European qualification by just 2 points. In this season Alfreð Finnbogason would also crown himself top scorer of the league, whilst also becoming Heerenveen's all time top scorer in the Eredivisie. In January 2014 Van Basten would announce he wouldn't sign a new contract with the club. Dwight Lodeweges would be his replacement, joining from rivals Cambuur. Lodeweges would stay at the club until October 2015, where a bad start in the 15 - 16 season would see Heerenveen in 15th after nine games with just one win would see him resign.

Foppe de Haan would return as interim manager for the next few games, but in the end ended up finishing the entire season. At the start of 2016 the club would announce that Luuc Eisinga would become director. In March of 2016 the club would announce that Jurgen Streppel would join from Willem II for the 2016 - 17 Eredivisie season. He would lead the club to consecutive European play-offs, leaving the club after 2 years in 2018. His replacement Jan Olde Riekerink would get sacked in April of 2019 with the club in 10th place of the Eredivisie. His assistant Johnny Jansen would see out the season as the interim manager. Jansen would sign a contract keeping him as permanent manager at the end of the season. On the 1st of March 2019 Luuc Eisinga would also get removed from his position as director, getting replaced by Cees Roozemond, who would stay in the job until 2023.

In January 2022 Jansen would get sacked, being replaced by Ole Tobiasen on an interim basis. Tobiasen would lead the team to European play-offs in the 21 - 22 season. In the summer Kees van Wonderen would take the job, joining from Go Ahead Eagles. He would bring the club to the European play-offs in his first season, but failed to do so in his second, meaning the club wouldn't renew his contract. He would be replaced by Robin van Persie in the summer of 2024. Van Persie would leave the club after just eight months to rejoin Feyenoord. Robin Veldman who had previously been manager of several youth teams at the club, would come in to replace him. Heerenveen would end the 24 - 25 Eredivisie in 9th place, once again sending them into the European play-offs.

== Stadium ==
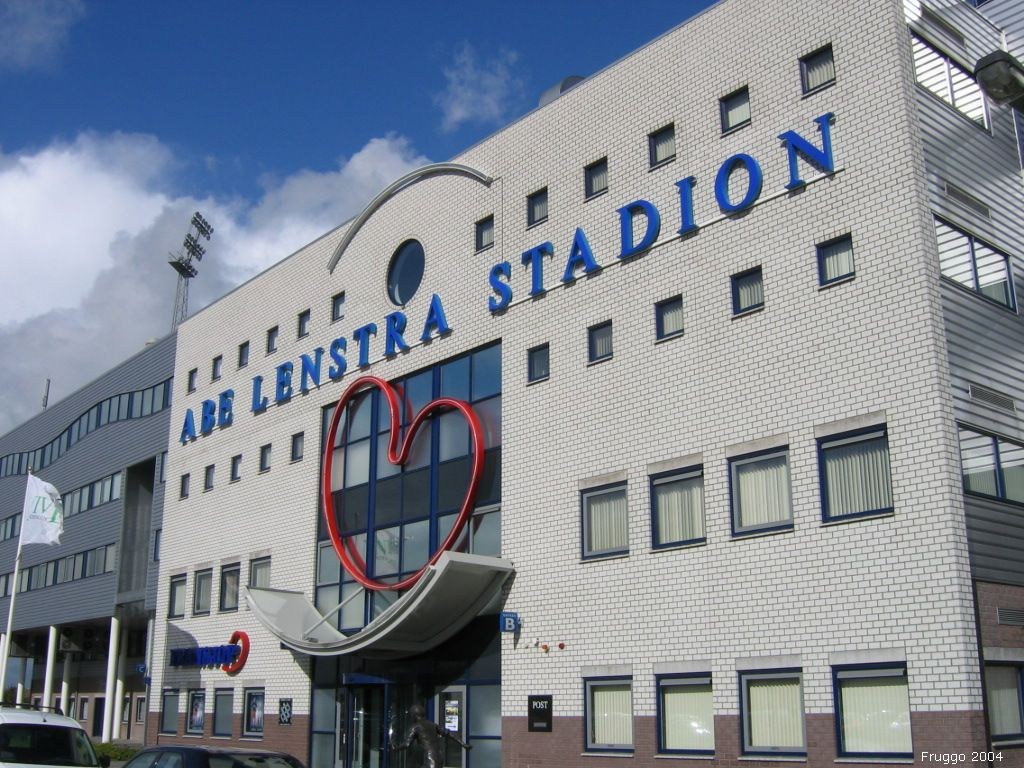
Home of Heerenveen, Abe Lenstra Stadion

The club plays its home matches at the Abe Lenstra Stadium, which opened in 1994 and holds 26,100 people. Before that, the team played at a ground with the same name elsewhere in the town, but it could not meet the increasing popularity of the club. Throughout the years, the club developed several plans to further expand the stadium. One of the plans was to extend at least one side stand towards the pitch, as seen in English football stadiums. Due to deteriorating league results and financial limitedness, however, those plans were shelved. It is uncertain whether or not the club will ever carry them out. Before the move to the Abe Lenstra Stadion, Heerenveen played at the Sportpark Noord. The club's training facilities are regarded as world class, which is said to be a major factor in their recruitment of younger players. The name of the clubs facilities is sportpark Skoatterwâld. The facilities are shared with VV Heerenveen and SC Heerenveen (women).

== Colours, crest and anthem ==
The crest on the club emblem is the symbol of the flag of Friesland. The flag of Friesland is based on the arms of the 15th century. The stripes and seeblatt shapes represent the districts of Friesland.

A unique tradition in the Dutch Eredivisie is that the Frisian national anthem is played and sung before every domestic match. UEFA does not allow this tradition in European matches. Nevertheless, the anthem is sung by the supporters anyway.

== Rivalry ==
=== SC Cambuur ===
Heerenveen retain a very fierce rivalry with SC Cambuur. One of the reasons of the rivalry is the short distance between the two clubs. Because of that the clubs often refer to each other as DKV which stands for Dertig Kilometer Verderop (Thirty Kilometers Away) so that they do not have to mention each other's names. However, the biggest and also the most confusing reason is the background of the clubs. Many people who aren't involved in the rivalry find it difficult to understand. Most of the Heerenveen fans are from small villages from the entire province (and even outside it) and are very proud of their Frisian identity. Since the 80's the club have been expressing this Frisian pride to the rest of the Netherlands. The Frisian flag, the Frisian anthem, all Frisian symbols were linked to the club, which made Heerenveen the face of Frisia. Because of this Cambuur slowly disappeared in the shadow of Heerenveen, as a reaction to this Cambuur fans started distancing themselves from the Frisian identity. Nowadays Cambuur do not consider themselves Frisian even though they are from the capital of the province. They now call themselves Leeuwarders aka people from the city. Heerenveen fans are mockingly called boeren (farmers) because Heerenveen isn't a city and the fans mainly live in small villages. Because of the successes of Heerenveen and the meager performances of Cambuur including almost going bankrupt, the rivalry was almost forgotten. When Cambuur got promoted back to the Eredivisie in 2013 by winning the 2012/13 season of the Jupiler League the rivalry got revived. Before the meeting on 29 September 2013 the game hadn't been played for 13 years, giving Cambuur a great opportunity to prove themselves. Heerenveen won that game 2–1. The away game later in the season was won 3–1 by Cambuur.

=== FC Groningen ===
The absence of Cambuur caused FC Groningen to be the nearest Eredivisie team and soon it became rivals with Heerenveen. Strikingly, both northern sides used to maintain more or less of a friendship in the past. Therefore, this Northern Derby rivalry is only based on geographical location. Because most Heerenveen fans have always considered Cambuur as main rivals, this derby is often referred to as a surrogate derby. Days before the game, Heerenveen and Groningen fans tease each other by means of playful actions, usually with no violence. Heerenveen fans once stole the centre spot from Stadion Oosterpark, and raised the Frisian flag at the Martinitoren, the highest tower in Groningen, combined with a banner saying "SCH op eenzame hoogte" (SCH on lonely height). The front yard of a Groningen chairman once got filled with rubble from a construction site. This was because the construction of the Euroborg had to be halted due to a major design mistake. Groningen fans countered by painting a statue of all-time Heerenveen hero Abe Lenstra green and white, the colours of Groningen. They also transformed a viaduct near Heerenveen to green and white.

In the 2001–02 season, Groningen fans awarded Heerenveen player Anthony Lurling with the title of "biggest cheat of the season" ("matennaaier van het seizoen" in Dutch) and handed him therefore a sewing machine ("naaimachine" in Dutch). In that same week the town signs of Heerenveen were changed to "Hoerenveen It Sucks" (Whore-veen) by the Groningen supporters. The following season, Groningen fans teased the Heerenveen following again, this time by establishing a border post on the border of Groningen and Friesland.

== Honours ==
- Netherlands Football League Championship / Eredivisie
  - Runners-up (3): 1946–47, 1947–48, 1999–2000
- KNVB Cup
  - Champions (1): 2008–09
  - Runners-up (2): 1992–93, 1996–97
- Eerste Divisie
  - Play-off Winners (2): 1989–90, 1992–93
  - Runners-up (1): 1980–81
- Tweede Divisie
  - Champions (1): 1969–70
  - Play-off Winners (1): 1959–60

== Domestic results ==
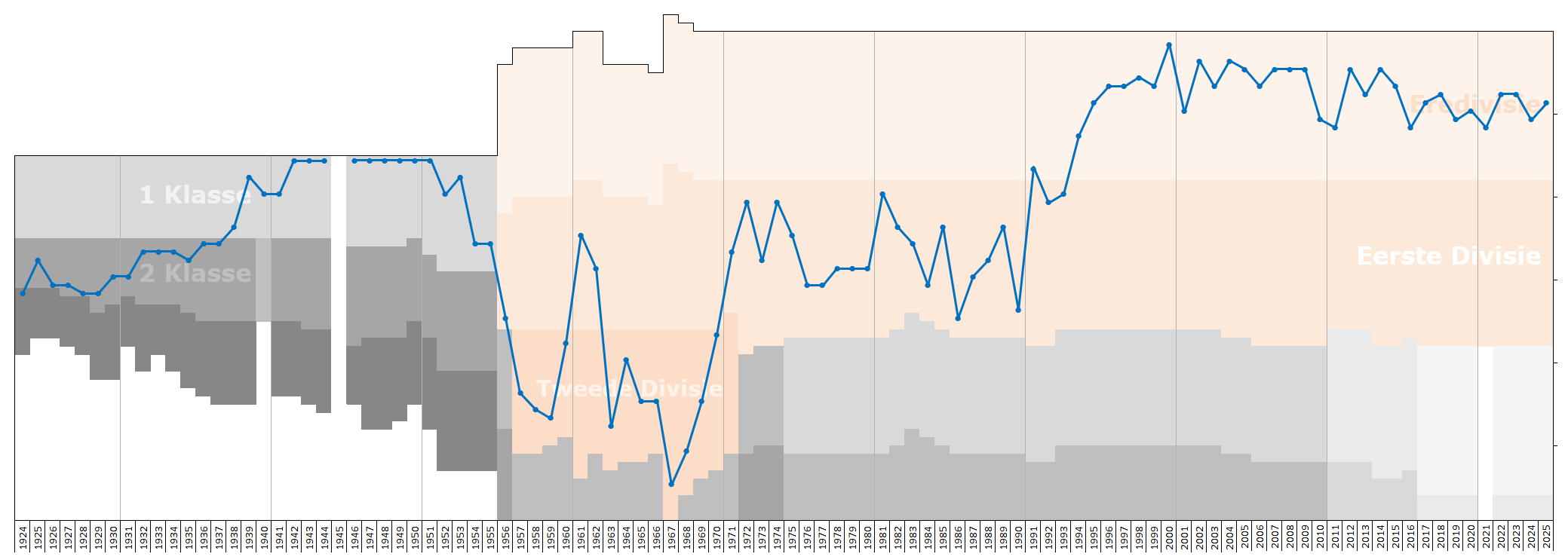
Historical chart of league performance

Below is a table with sc Heerenveen's domestic results since the introduction of the Eredivisie in 1956.

Domestic Results since 1956
Domestic league	League result	Qualification to	KNVB Cup season	Cup result
2024–25 Eredivisie	9th	– (losing UECL play-offs)	2024–25	round of 16
2023–24 Eredivisie	11th	–	2023–24	second round
2022–23 Eredivisie	8th	– (losing UECL play-offs)	2022–23	quarter-final
2021–22 Eredivisie	8th	– (losing UECL play-offs)	2021–22	round of 16
2020–21 Eredivisie	12th	–	2020–21	semi-final
2019–20 Eredivisie	10th	–	2019–20	quarter-final
2018–19 Eredivisie	11th	–	2018–19	quarter-final
2017–18 Eredivisie	8th	– (losing EL play-offs)	2017–18	round of 16
2016–17 Eredivisie	9th	–	2016–17	quarter-final
2015–16 Eredivisie	12th	–	2015–16	round of 16
2014–15 Eredivisie	7th	– (losing EL play-offs)	2014–15	second round
2013–14 Eredivisie	5th	– (losing EL play-offs)	2013–14	round of 16
2012–13 Eredivisie	8th	(losing UC play-offs)	2012–13	fourth round
2011–12 Eredivisie	5th	Europa League (Q3)	2011–12	semi-final
2010–11 Eredivisie	12th	–	2010–11	fourth round
2009–10 Eredivisie	11th	–	2009–10	round of 16
2008–09 Eredivisie	5th	Europa League (Q4)	2008–09	winners
2007–08 Eredivisie	5th	UEFA Cup (losing CL play-offs)	2007–08	third round
2006–07 Eredivisie	5th	UEFA Cup (losing CL play-offs)	2006–07	second round
2005–06 Eredivisie	7th	UEFA Cup (winning UC play-offs)	2005–06	quarter-final
2004–05 Eredivisie	5th	UEFA Cup	2004–05	round of 16
2003–04 Eredivisie	4th	UEFA Cup	2003–04	round of 16
2002–03 Eredivisie	7th	Intertoto Cup (R3)	2002–03	quarter-final
2001–02 Eredivisie	4th	UEFA Cup	2001–02	quarter-final
2000–01 Eredivisie	10th	Intertoto Cup (R2)	2000–01	semi-final
1999–2000 Eredivisie	2nd	Champions League	1999–2000	second round
1998–99 Eredivisie	7th	Intertoto Cup (R3)	1998–99	second round
1997–98 Eredivisie	6th	Cup Winners' Cup	1997–98	3rd place
1996–97 Eredivisie	7th	Intertoto Cup	1996–97	final
1995–96 Eredivisie	7th	Intertoto Cup	1995–96	second round
1994–95 Eredivisie	9th	Intertoto Cup	1994–95	semi-final
1993–94 Eredivisie	13th	–	1993–94	third round
1992–93 Eerste Divisie	2nd	Eredivisie (winning promotion/releg. play-offs)	1992–93	final
1991–92 Eerste Divisie	3rd	–	1991–92	third round
1990–91 Eredivisie	17th	Eerste Divisie (relegation)	1990–91	first round
1989–90 Eerste Divisie	16th	Eredivisie (winning promotion/releg. play-offs)	1989–90	second round
1988–89 Eerste Divisie	6th	promotion/relegation play-offs: no promotion	1988–89	round of 16
1987–88 Eerste Divisie	10th	–	1987–88	first round
1986–87 Eerste Divisie	12th	–	1986–87	first round
1985–86 Eerste Divisie	17th	–	1985–86	second round
1984–85 Eerste Divisie	6th	–	1984–85	second round
1983–84 Eerste Divisie	13th	–	1983–84	first round
1982–83 Eerste Divisie	8th	–	1982–83	second round
1981–82 Eerste Divisie	6th	promotion/relegation play-offs: no promotion	1981–82	second round
1980–81 Eerste Divisie	2nd	promotion/relegation play-offs: no promotion	1980–81	second round
1979–80 Eerste Divisie	11th	–	1979–80	second round
1978–79 Eerste Divisie	11th	–	1978–79	second round
1977–78 Eerste Divisie	11th	–	1977–78	first round
1976–77 Eerste Divisie	13th	–	1976–77	second round
1975–76 Eerste Divisie	13th	–	1975–76	first round
1974–75 Eerste Divisie	7th	–	1974–75	first round
1973–74 Eerste Divisie	3rd	–	1973–74	second round
1972–73 Eerste Divisie	10th	–	1972–73	second round
1971–72 Eerste Divisie	3rd	–	1971–72	first round
1970–71 Eerste Divisie	9th	–	1970–71	first round
1969–70 Tweede Divisie	1st	Eerste Divisie (promotion)	1969–70	first round
1968–69 Tweede Divisie	9th	–	1968–69	round of 16
1967–68 Tweede Divisie	15th	–	1967–68	group stage
1966–67 Tweede Divisie	19th	–	1966–67	DNC
1965–66 Tweede Divisie	9th (group A)	–	1965–66	group stage
1964–65 Tweede Divisie	9th (group A)	–	1964–65	second round
1963–64 Tweede Divisie	4th (group A)	–	1963–64	first round
1962–63 Tweede Divisie	12th (group A)	–	1962–63	first round
1961–62 Eerste Divisie	11th (group B)	Tweede Divisie (relegation)	1961–62	third round
1960–61 Eerste Divisie	7th (group B)	–	1960–61	?
1959–60 Tweede Divisie	3rd (group B)	Eerste Divisie (winning promo./releg. play-off)	not held	not held
1958–59 Tweede Divisie	11th (group B)	–	1958–59	round of 16
1957–58 Tweede Divisie	10th (group B)	–	1957–58	?
1956–57 Tweede Divisie	8th (group A)	–	1956–57	?

== European competition ==
SC Heerenveen played 16 seasons in one of the European club football competitions.

score marked with * = first played match

Season	Competition	Round	Opposition	Home	Away
1995	UEFA Intertoto Cup	Group 4	(Denmark) Næstved BK	2–1	
1995	UEFA Intertoto Cup	Group 4	(Wales) Ton Pentre		7–0
1995	UEFA Intertoto Cup	Group 4	(Hungary) Békéscsaba Előre	4–0	
1995	UEFA Intertoto Cup	Group 4	(Portugal) União de Leiria		0–1
1995	UEFA Intertoto Cup	Round of 16	(Romania) Farul Constanța	4–0	
1995	UEFA Intertoto Cup	Quarter-finals	(France) Bordeaux		0–2
1996	UEFA Intertoto Cup	Group 5	(Republic of Ireland) Sligo Rovers		0–0
1996	UEFA Intertoto Cup	Group 5	(Norway) Lillestrøm	0–1	
1996	UEFA Intertoto Cup	Group 5	(France) Nantes		1–3
1996	UEFA Intertoto Cup	Group 5	(Lithuania) FBK Kaunas	3–1	
1997	UEFA Intertoto Cup	Group 1	(Belarus) FC Dinamo-93 Minsk		0–1
1997	UEFA Intertoto Cup	Group 1	(Poland) Polonia Warsaw	0–0	
1997	UEFA Intertoto Cup	Group 1	(Germany) MSV Duisburg		0–2
1997	UEFA Intertoto Cup	Group 1	(Denmark) Aalborg BK	8–2	
1998–99	UEFA Cup Winners' Cup	First round	(Poland) Amica Wronki	3-1 *	1–0
1998–99	UEFA Cup Winners' Cup	Second round	(Croatia) Varteks	2–1 *	2–4 (a.e.t.)
1999	UEFA Intertoto Cup	Third round	(Sweden) Hammarby IF	2-0 *	2–0
1999	UEFA Intertoto Cup	Semi-finals	(England) West Ham United	0–1	0–1 *
2000–01	UEFA Champions League	Group C	(Spain) Valencia	0–1	1–1
2000–01	UEFA Champions League	Group C	(France) Lyon	0–2	1–3
2000–01	UEFA Champions League	Group C	(Greece) Olympiacos	1–0	0–2
2001	UEFA Intertoto Cup	Second round	(Latvia) Liepājas Metalurgs	6–1	2–3 *
2001	UEFA Intertoto Cup	Third round	(Switzerland) Basel	2–3	1–2 *
2002–03	UEFA Cup	First round	(Romania) Național București	2–0	0–3 *
2003	UEFA Intertoto Cup	Third round	(Belgium) Lierse	4–1 *	1–0
2003	UEFA Intertoto Cup	Semi-finals	(Slovenia) Koper	2–0 *	0–1
2003	UEFA Intertoto Cup	Finals	(Spain) Villarreal	1–2 *	0–0
2004–05	UEFA Cup	First round	(Israel) Maccabi Petah Tikva	5–0	n.p. *
2004–05	UEFA Cup	Group G	(Portugal) Benfica		2–4
2004–05	UEFA Cup	Group G	(Germany) VfB Stuttgart	1–0	
2004–05	UEFA Cup	Group G	(Croatia) Dinamo Zagreb		2–2
2004–05	UEFA Cup	Group G	(Belgium) Beveren	1–0	
2004–05	UEFA Cup	Third round	(England) Newcastle United	1–2 *	1–2
2005–06	UEFA Cup	First round	(Czech Republic) Baník Ostrava	5–0	0–2 *
2005–06	UEFA Cup	Group F	(Romania) Dinamo București		0–0
2005–06	UEFA Cup	Group F	(Russia) CSKA Moscow	0–0	
2005–06	UEFA Cup	Group F	(France) Marseille		0–1
2005–06	UEFA Cup	Group F	(Bulgaria) Levski Sofia	2–1	
2005–06	UEFA Cup	Third round	(Romania) Steaua București	1–3 *	1–0
2006–07	UEFA Cup	First round	(Portugal) Vitória de Setúbal	0–0	3–0 *
2006–07	UEFA Cup	Group D	(Spain) Osasuna		0–0
2006–07	UEFA Cup	Group D	(Denmark) Odense	0–2	
2006–07	UEFA Cup	Group D	(Italy) Parma		1–2
2006–07	UEFA Cup	Group D	(France) Lens	1–0	
2007–08	UEFA Cup	First round	(Sweden) Helsingborgs IF	5-3 *	1–5
2008-09	UEFA Cup	First round	(Portugal) Vitória de Setúbal	5–2	1–1 *
2008-09	UEFA Cup	Group E	(Italy) Milan	1–3	
2008-09	UEFA Cup	Group E	(Germany) VfL Wolfsburg		1–5
2008-09	UEFA Cup	Group E	(Portugal) Braga	1–2	
2008-09	UEFA Cup	Group E	(England) Portsmouth		0–3
2009–10	UEFA Europa League	Play-off round	(Greece) PAOK	1–1 (a) *	0–0
2009–10	UEFA Europa League	Group D	(Portugal) Sporting CP	2–3	1–1
2009–10	UEFA Europa League	Group D	(Germany) Hertha BSC	2–3	1–0
2009–10	UEFA Europa League	Group D	(Latvia) Ventspils	5–0	0–0
2012–13	UEFA Europa League	Third Q-round	(Romania) Rapid București	4–0 *	0–1
2012–13	UEFA Europa League	Play-off round	(Norway) Molde	1-2	0-2 *

^1 Due to safety concerns in Israel, the first leg was cancelled by UEFA.
^2 Played in Estádio José Alvalade, Lisbon.

== Current squad ==
As of 22 September 2026

Note: Flags indicate national team as defined under FIFA eligibility rules; some limited exceptions apply. Players may hold more than one non-FIFA nationality.

No.	Pos.	Nation	Player
2	DF	IDN	Mees Hilgers
3	DF	NED	Maas Willemsen
4	DF	NED	Sam Kersten
6	MF	NED	Dirk Proper
7	FW	FRA	Maxence Rivera
9	FW	SUR	Dylan Vente
10	MF	NED	Ringo Meerveld
11	MF	BEL	Luca Oyen
13	DF	NED	Mats Egbring
14	MF	NED	Levi Smans
16	MF	SWE	Marcus Linday
17	FW	LAT	Roberts Uldriķis
19	DF	GRE	Vasilios Zagaritis

No.	Pos.	Nation	Player
20	FW	DEN	Jacob Trenskow
21	MF	IRQ	Marko Farji
22	GK	NED	Bernt Klaverboer
23	DF	FRA	Darling Bladi
28	DF	BUL	Hristiyan Petrov
29	FW	FRA	Lanroy Machine (on loan from Angers)
30	GK	NED	Timo Schreuder
36	MF	COD	Nolhan Courtens
41	GK	NED	Jimte Scholten
44	GK	NED	Andries Noppert
45	DF	NOR	Oliver Braude
49	MF	NED	Anass Bouziane
—	GK	NED	Sten Kremers

=== Out on loan ===
Note: Flags indicate national team as defined under FIFA eligibility rules; some limited exceptions apply. Players may hold more than one non-FIFA nationality.

No.	Pos.	Nation	Player
—	FW	NED	Eser Gürbüz (at Willem II until 30 June 2027)

== Notable former players ==
Players listed below have had junior and/or senior international cap(s) for their respective countries before, while and/or after playing at Heerenveen.

- (Australia) Raphael Bove
- (Austria) Thomas Prager
- (Belgium) Sven Kums
- (Belgium) Brian Vandenbussche
- (Brazil) Afonso Alves
- (Brazil) Paulo Henrique
- (Bulgaria) Ivan Tsvetkov
- (Canada) Tristan Borges
- (Canada) Rob Friend
- (Canada) Will Johnson
- (Cape Verde) Cecilio Lopes
- (Croatia) Danijel Pranjić
- (Czech Republic) Martin Lejsal
- (Czech Republic) Michal Papadopulos
- (Czech Republic) Michal Švec
- (Denmark) Kristian Bak Nielsen
- (Denmark) Daniel Jensen
- (Denmark) Allan K. Jepsen
- (Denmark) Hjalte Nørregaard
- (Denmark) Marc Nygaard
- (Denmark) Jakob Poulsen
- (Denmark) Lasse Schöne
- (Denmark) Ole Tobiasen
- (Denmark) Jon Dahl Tomasson
- (Estonia) Sergei Mošnikov
- (Finland) Hannu Haarala
- (Finland) Mika Nurmela
- (Finland) Juska Savolainen
- (Finland) Niklas Tarvajärvi
- (Finland) Mika Väyrynen
- (Germany) Mark Uth
- (Ghana) Matthew Amoah
- (Greece) Georgios Samaras
- (Guatemala) Marco Pappa
- (Haiti) Lesly Fellinga
- (Iceland) Arnór Smárason
- (Iceland) Alfred Finnbogason
- (Indonesia) Thom Haye
- (Indonesia) Nathan Tjoe-A-On
- (Iran) Reza Ghoochannejhad
- (Ivory Coast) Bonaventure Kalou
- (Japan) Yuki Kobayashi
- (Kosovo) Ibrahim Drešević
- (Kosovo) Arbër Zeneli
- (North Macedonia) Samir Fazli
- (North Macedonia) Mile Krstev
- (North Macedonia) Goran Popov
- (Moldova) Ion Nicolaescu
- (Morocco) Oussama Assaidi
- (Morocco) Ali Elkhattabi
- (Morocco) Abdelkarim Kissi
- (Morocco) Khalid Sinouh
- (Morocco) Oussama Tannane
- (Morocco) Hakim Ziyech
- (Netherlands) Mario Been
- (Netherlands) Roy Beerens
- (Netherlands) Paul Bosvelt
- (Netherlands) Michel Breuer
- (Netherlands) Arnold Bruggink
- (Netherlands) Jerry de Jong
- (Netherlands) Marten de Roon
- (Netherlands) Romano Denneboom
- (Netherlands) Bas Dost
- (Netherlands) Denzel Dumfries
- (Netherlands) Johan Hansma
- (Netherlands) Germ Hofma
- (Netherlands) Klaas-Jan Huntelaar
- (Netherlands) Daryl Janmaat
- (Netherlands) Kees Kist
- (Netherlands) Martin Koeman
- (Netherlands) Abe Lenstra
- (Netherlands) Henny Meijer
- (Netherlands) Luciano Narsingh
- (Netherlands) Andries Noppert
- (Netherlands) Stijn Schaars
- (Netherlands) Gerald Sibon
- (Netherlands) Victor Sikora
- (Netherlands) Daley Sinkgraven
- (Netherlands) Jerry St. Juste
- (Netherlands) Jeffrey Talan
- (Netherlands) Henk Timmer
- (Netherlands) René van der Gijp
- (Netherlands) Milan van Ewijk
- (Netherlands) Jan Paul van Hecke
- (Netherlands) Ruud van Nistelrooy
- (Netherlands) Henk Veerman
- (Netherlands) Joey Veerman
- (Netherlands) Michel Vlap
- (Netherlands) Uğur Yıldırım
- (Nigeria) Emmanuel Ebiede
- (Nigeria) Henry Onwuzuruike
- (Norway) Daniel Berg Hestad
- (Norway) Tarik Elyounoussi
- (Norway) Christian Grindheim
- (Norway) Thomas Holm
- (Norway) Martin Ødegaard
- (Poland) Radosław Matusiak
- (Poland) Arkadiusz Radomski
- (Poland) Tomasz Rząsa
- (Romania) Ioan Andone
- (Romania) Rodion Cămătaru
- (Romania) Florin Constantinovici
- (Romania) Dumitru Mitriță
- (Russia) Igor Korneev
- (Serbia) Filip Đuričić
- (Serbia) Igor Đurić
- (Serbia) Miralem Sulejmani
- (South Africa) Hans Vonk
- (Sweden) Marcus Allbäck
- (Sweden) Erik Edman
- (Sweden) Viktor Elm
- (Sweden) Petter Hansson
- (Sweden) Sam Larsson
- (Sweden) Lasse Nilsson
- (Sweden) Amin Sarr
- (Sweden) Stefan Selaković
- (United States) Michael Bradley
- (United States) Robbie Rogers
- (Federal Republic of Yugoslavia) Radoslav Samardžić

== Club staff ==
Position	Staff
Head coach	(Netherlands) Robin Veldman
Assistant Coach	(Netherlands) Henk Brugge (Netherlands) Brian Pinas (Netherlands) Michiel de Boer
Goalkeeper Coach	(Netherlands) Harmen Kuperus
Rehab Coach	Jeroen Smit
Video Analyst	Yöri Bosschaart
Chief Scout	Peter Maas
Scout	André Hanssen; Søren Frederiksen; Dirk Jan Derksen
Youth Chief Scout	Marten van der Kamp
Physiotherapist	Erik ten Voorde; Johnny de Vries
Masseur	Thom van der Heide
Performance Manager	Nico Romeijn
Kit Manager	Catrinus Stoker; Benny Hulzinga
Strategic Advisor	Rob Koeken
Academy Manager	Marcel van Buuren

== Coaching history ==
No official trainer from 1920 to 1930

- (Netherlands) Sjoerd van Zuylen (1930–32)
- (England) Sid Castle (1932)
- (Netherlands) Otto Pinter (1932–33)
- (Netherlands) Dirk Steenbergen (1934)
- (Netherlands) Theo Eikenaar (1934–36)
- (England) Sid Castle (1936–38)
- (Netherlands) Piet Smit (1938–39)
- (Netherlands) Anton Dalhuysen (1939–45)
- (Netherlands) Otto Bonsema (1945)
- (Netherlands) Abe Lenstra (1946–47)
- (Netherlands) Piet van der Munnik (1947–51)
- (England) Bob Kelly (1951–55)
- (Netherlands) Volgert Ris (1955–58)
- (Netherlands) Siem Plooijer (1958–61)
- (Netherlands) Arie de Vroet (1961–63)
- (Netherlands) Evert Mur (1963–65)
- (Hungary) László Zalai (1965–66)
- (Netherlands) Ron Groenewoud (1966–67)
- (Netherlands) Evert Teunissen (1967–69)
- (Netherlands) Bas Paauwe Jr. (1969–71)
- (Netherlands) Meg de Jongh (1971–73)
- (Hungary) Laszlo Zalai (1973–78)
- (Netherlands) Jan Teunissen (1978–80)
- (Netherlands) Hylke Kerkstra (interim) (1980)
- (Netherlands) Henk van Brussel (1980–85)
- (Netherlands) Foppe de Haan (1985–88)
- (Netherlands) Ted Immers (1988–89)
- (Netherlands) Ab Gritter (1989–90)
- (Germany) Fritz Korbach (1 July 1990 – 30 June 1992)
- (Netherlands) Foppe de Haan (18 October 1992 – 30 June 2004)
- (Netherlands) Gertjan Verbeek (1 July 2004 – 30 June 2008)
- (Norway) Trond Sollied (1 July 2008 – 31 August 2009)
- (Netherlands) Jan de Jonge (31 August 2009 – 3 February 2010)
- (Netherlands) Jan Everse (int.) (5 February 2010 – 30 June 2010)
- (Netherlands) Ron Jans (1 July 2010 – 30 June 2012)
- (Netherlands) Marco van Basten (1 July 2012 – 30 June 2014)
- (Netherlands) Dwight Lodeweges (1 July 2014 – 20 October 2015)
- (Netherlands) Foppe de Haan (int.) (20 October 2015 – 30 June 2016)
- (Netherlands) Jurgen Streppel (1 July 2016 – 30 June 2018)
- (Netherlands) Jan Olde Riekerink (1 July 2018 – 10 April 2019)
- (Netherlands) Johnny Jansen (10 April 2019 – 24 January 2022)
- (Denmark) Ole Tobiasen (int.) (4 February 2022 – 30 June 2022)
- (Netherlands) Kees van Wonderen (1 July 2022 – 17 May 2024)
- (Netherlands) Robin van Persie (17 May 2024 – 23 February 2025)
- (Netherlands) Henk Brugge (int.) (23 February 2025 – 21 March 2025)
- (Netherlands) Robin Veldman (21 March 2025 –)

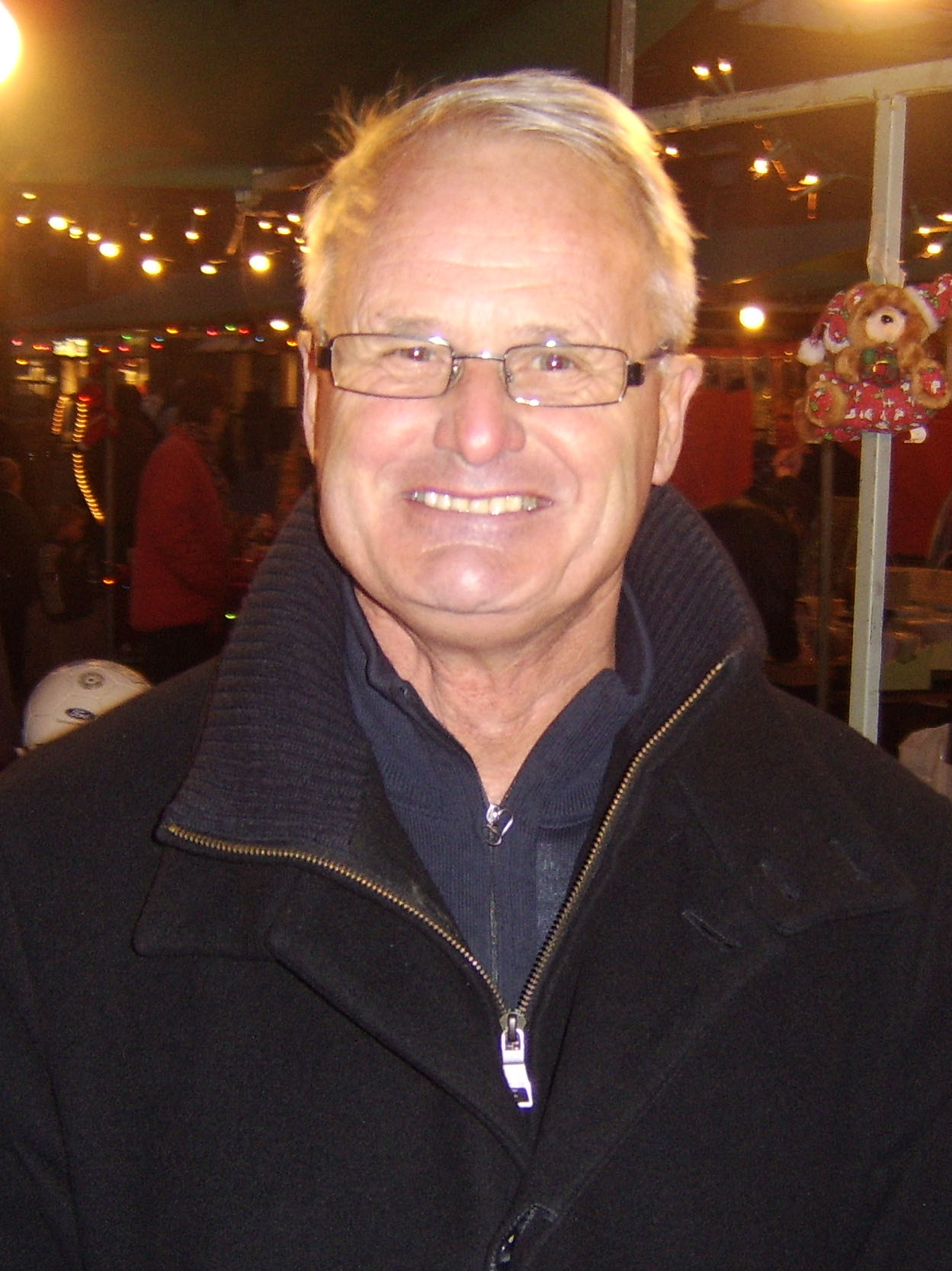
Foppe de Haan – manager from 1985 to 1988 and from 1992 until 2004 and from 2015 until 2016 (int.).

== Match statistics ==
All competitions

- Biggest home win: SC Heerenveen - FC Oss 11–1; KNVB Cup (21 December 2011)
- Biggest score: Ton Pentre AFC - sc Heerenveen 0–7; Intertoto (2 July 1995)
- Largest double result: Helsingborg IF - sc Heerenveen 8-6 (3-5 and 5–1); UEFA Cup 1st Round (2007)
- Most goals in a season: 88 goals, 2007/08
- Most goals in a game: Afonso Alves 7 (also an Eredivisie record); sc Heerenveen - Heracles (7 October 2007)

Eredivisie

- Biggest home win: sc Heerenveen - Heracles Almelo 9-0 (7 October 2007)
- Biggest game: Willem II - sc Heerenveen 1-6 (23 February 2001)
- Largest home defeat: sc Heerenveen - PSV Eindhoven 0-8 (25 April 2024)
- Fastest penalty for: sc Heerenveen - sc Cambuur (19 October 2014)

Champions League

- Biggest home win: SC Heerenveen - Olympiakos Piraeus 1-0 (17 October 2000)
- Most spacious stay: none
- Highest draw: Valencia CF - sc Heerenveen 1-1 (7 November 2000)
- Largest double result: SC Heerenveen - Lyon 1-5 (2000)

European Cup II

- Biggest home win: SC Heerenveen - KS Amica Wronki 3-1 (17 September 1998)
- Biggest game: KS Amica Wronki - sc Heerenveen 0-1 (1 October 1998)
- Largest double result: sc Heerenveen - KS Amica Wronki 4-1 (1998)

UEFA Cup

- Biggest home win: SC Heerenveen - Maccabi Petach Tikwa 5-0 (30 September 2004), SC Heerenveen - FC Baník Ostrava 5-0 (29 September 2005) and SC Heerenveen - FK Ventspils 5-0 (16 December 2009)
- Biggest game: Vitória Setúbal - sc Heerenveen 0-3 (14 September 2006)
- Largest double result: Helsingsborg IF - sc Heerenveen 8-6 (2007)

Intertoto Cup

- Biggest home win: SC Heerenveen - Aalborg BK 8-2 (19 July 1997)
- Biggest score: Ton Pentre AFC - sc Heerenveen 0-7 (2 July 1995)
- Largest double result: FHK Liepajas Metalurgs - sc Heerenveen 4-8 (2001)

== Women's team ==
In 2007, SC Heerenveen created a women's football team, which competes in the Vrouwen Eredivisie, and between 2012 and 2015 in the BeNe League. While it has ranked mostly in the table's bottom positions, in 2011 it reached the national cup's final, lost against AZ. Vivianne Miedema and Sherida Spitse started their professional career at Heerenveen.

== See also ==
- List of football clubs in the Netherlands
- SC Heerenveen in European football
