= Sid Castle =

English footballer (1892–1978)

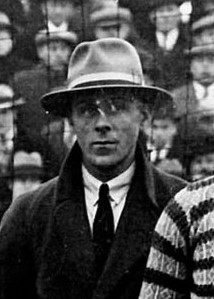
- Castle in 1927

Personal information
- Full name: Sidney Ernest Rowland Castle
- Date of birth: 12 March 1892
- Place of birth: Basingstoke, England
- Date of death: 27 January 1978 (aged 85)
- Place of death: Basingstoke, England
- Height: 5 ft 8 in (1.73 m)
- Position: Outside right

Senior career*
Years	Team	Apps	(Gls)
- Basingstoke Town
- Thornycroft Athletic
- Guildford United
1919–1920	Tottenham Hotspur	5	(0)
1921–1922	Charlton Athletic	66	(10)
1923–1924	Chelsea	33	(2)
- Guildford United

Managerial career
- 1927–1928: Ajax
- 1928–1930: ZAC
- 1930–?: PEC
- 1932: Heerenveen
- 1933–1935: Meppeler Sport Club
- 1936–1938: Heerenveen
- * Club domestic league appearances and goals

Sidney Ernest Rowland Castle (12 March 1892 in Basingstoke – 27 January 1978) was an English professional footballer who played for Basingstoke Town, Thornycroft Athletic, Guildford United, Tottenham Hotspur, Charlton Athletic, and Chelsea.

== Playing career ==
After playing for Basingstoke Town, Thorneycrofts and Guildford United, the outside right joined Tottenham Hotspur. Between 1919 and 1920, Castle made five appearances for Spurs. He signed for Charlton Athletic in 1921 and went on to play in 66 matches, scoring 10 goals. In 1923, Castle signed for Chelsea, where he featured in a further 33 games and found the net twice. He rejoined Guildford United, where he ended his playing career.

== Managerial career ==
He coached in the Netherlands at Ajax between early 1927 and September 1928 and two teams from Zwolle before coaching Heerenveen in two spells and FC Meppel.
