= Johan Hansma =

Dutch footballer

Personal information
- Date of birth: 11 June 1969 (age 57)
- Place of birth: Marknesse, Netherlands
- Position: Centre-back

Youth career
- SVM Marknesse
- –1988: PEC Zwolle

Senior career*
| Years | Team | Apps | (Gls) |
| 1988–1993 | PEC Zwolle | 169 | (5) |
| 1994–2004 | SC Heerenveen | 227 | (15) |
| Total | | 396 | (20) |
- * Club domestic league appearances and goals

Johan Hansma (born 11 June 1969) is a Dutch former professional footballer who played as a centre-back for PEC Zwolle and SC Heerenveen.

== Playing career ==
Hansma played youth football for hometown club SVM Marknesse. He made his debut with PEC Zwolle on 20 August 1988 in a game against BV Veendam. He played for PEC Zwolle for six seasons, and played during their bankruptcy which saw their name change to FC Zwolle. He then moved to SC Heerenveen halfway through the 1993–94 season. He subsequently played ten seasons for Heerenveen during which Hansma won the 'Silver Shoe' in 1999 in the rankings of 'Footballer of the Year' behind winner Michael Mols. They finished Eredivisie runners up and subsequently Hansma played in the 2000–01 UEFA Champions League. In the 2003–04 season, after many injuries, Hansma retired from professional football. During that season, he had played only one game. In the 2004–05 season, Hansma played a number of games for Flevo Boys in the Eerste Klasse.

== Executive career ==
Hansma became technical manager at SC Heerenveen from the 2010–11 season, until October 2013 when he was fired. Before that, he held the position of commercial manager. Players such as Alfreð Finnbogason and Mark Uth were brought to the club by him, as was manager Marco van Basten. During his spell, the Heerenveen youth academy brought forth players such as Jeffrey Gouweleeuw, Hakim Ziyech and Daley Sinkgraven. After a successful spell as technical manager at Almere City, with whom he clinched a first ever promotion to the Eredivisie, he rejoined Heerenveen in 2025.
