= 1946–47 Netherlands Football League Championship =

Netherl. Football Championship
- Season: 1946–1947
- Champions: AFC Ajax (8th title)

The Netherlands Football League Championship 1946–1947 was contested by 66 teams participating in six divisions. The national champion would be determined by a play-off featuring the winners of the eastern, northern, two southern and two western football divisions of the Netherlands. AFC Ajax won this year's championship by beating sc Heerenveen, NEC Nijmegen, MVV Maastricht, BVV Den Bosch and Blauw-Wit Amsterdam.

== New entrants ==
Eerste Klasse East:

- Promoted from 2nd Division: Vitesse Arnhem

Eerste Klasse North:

- Promoted from 2nd Division: FC Emmen

Eerste Klasse South-I:

- Moving in from South-II: VVV Venlo
- Promoted from 2nd Division: Helmondia

Eerste Klasse South-II:

- Moving in from South-I: FC Eindhoven
- Promoted from 2nd Division: Sittardse Boys

Eerste Klasse West-I:

- Moving in from West-II: DWS, Feijenoord and Sparta Rotterdam

Eerste Klasse West-II:

- Moving in from West-I: DOS, De Volewijckers and Xerxes
- Promoted from 2nd Division: SBV Excelsior

== Divisions ==
=== Eerste Klasse East ===
Pos	Team	Pld	W	D	L	GF	GA	GD	Pts	Qualification or relegation
1	NEC Nijmegen	20	13	5	2	47	26	+21	31	Qualified for Championship play-off
2	Go Ahead	20	13	3	4	44	29	+15	29	
3	AGOVV Apeldoorn	20	10	4	6	47	33	+14	24	
4	Quick Nijmegen	20	10	2	8	45	40	+5	22	
5	FC Wageningen	20	6	8	6	34	37	−3	20	
6	Heracles	20	5	8	7	36	31	+5	18	
7	SC Enschede	20	5	7	8	36	38	−2	17	
8	Be Quick Zutphen	20	6	4	10	35	46	−11	16	
9	Enschedese Boys	20	6	3	11	37	46	−9	15	
10	Vitesse	20	6	3	11	37	56	−19	15	
11	HVV Tubantia	20	4	5	11	28	44	−16	13	Relegated to 2nd Division

Source: rsssf.com

=== Eerste Klasse North ===
Pos	Team	Pld	W	D	L	GF	GA	GD	Pts	Qualification
1	sc Heerenveen	20	17	2	1	108	30	+78	36	Qualified for Championship play-off
2	Be Quick 1887	20	14	2	4	62	34	+28	30	
3	GVAV Rapiditas	20	11	4	5	58	46	+12	26	
4	Sneek Wit Zwart	20	9	5	6	29	29	0	23	
5	Veendam	20	7	4	9	38	54	−16	18	
6	HSC	20	6	5	9	32	32	0	17	
7	VV Leeuwarden	20	5	6	9	26	49	−23	16	
8	Achilles 1894	20	5	5	10	33	49	−16	15	
9	Velocitas 1897	20	5	3	12	40	55	−15	13	
10	LAC Frisia 1883	20	6	1	13	45	63	−18	13	
11	FC Emmen	20	6	1	13	26	56	−30	13	

Source: rsssf.com

=== Eerste Klasse South-I ===
Pos	Team	Pld	W	D	L	GF	GA	GD	Pts	Qualification or relegation
1	BVV Den Bosch	20	16	2	2	49	16	+33	34	Qualified for Championship play-off
2	NOAD	20	12	5	3	42	27	+15	29	Transferred to South-II
3	Willem II	20	13	2	5	46	22	+24	28	
4	NAC	20	10	2	8	52	39	+13	22	Transferred to South-II
5	LONGA	20	7	7	6	41	31	+10	21	
6	VVV Venlo	20	7	4	9	42	41	+1	18	Transferred to South-II
7	HVV Helmond	20	7	3	10	36	45	−9	17	
8	VC Vlissingen	20	5	5	10	27	49	−22	15	Transferred to South-II
9	Baronie/DNL	20	5	3	12	22	57	−35	13	
10	Helmondia	20	4	4	12	26	41	−15	12	Transferred to South-II
11	RKTVV Tilburg	20	4	3	13	29	44	−15	11	Relegated to 2nd Division

Source: rsssf.com

=== Eerste Klasse South-II ===
Pos	Team	Pld	W	D	L	GF	GA	GD	Pts	Qualification
1	MVV Maastricht	20	13	4	3	54	16	+38	30	Qualified for Championship play-off
2	Sittardse Boys	20	12	4	4	48	29	+19	28	Transferred to South-I
3	PSV Eindhoven	20	11	5	4	41	30	+11	27	
4	Limburgia	20	9	4	7	46	40	+6	22	
5	FC Eindhoven	20	6	6	8	29	32	−3	18	Transferred to South-I
6	Maurits	20	6	5	9	35	38	−3	17	Transferred to South-I
7	SC Emma	20	6	5	9	35	46	−11	17	
8	Juliana	20	5	7	8	34	52	−18	17	Transferred to South-I
9	De Spechten	20	5	6	9	42	56	−14	16	Transferred to South-I
10	Bleijerheide	20	5	5	10	29	43	−14	15	
11	Brabantia	20	5	3	12	33	44	−11	13	

Source: rsssf.com

=== Eerste Klasse West-I ===
Pos	Team	Pld	W	D	L	GF	GA	GD	Pts	Qualification or relegation
1	AFC Ajax	20	13	3	4	50	31	+19	29	Qualified for Championship play-off
2	Feijenoord	20	10	4	6	57	44	+13	24	Transferred to West-II
3	DWS	20	8	5	7	33	29	+4	21	Transferred to West-II
4	HFC EDO	20	9	2	9	41	36	+5	20	Transferred to West-II
5	RFC Rotterdam	20	8	4	8	50	44	+6	20	
6	Sparta Rotterdam	20	8	3	9	38	37	+1	19	Transferred to West-II
7	Hermes DVS	20	7	4	9	42	48	−6	18	
8	ADO Den Haag	20	8	2	10	30	35	−5	18	Transferred to West-II
9	HVV 't Gooi	20	7	4	9	33	41	−8	18	
10	VSV	20	8	2	10	45	56	−11	18	
11	Emma	20	6	3	11	41	59	−18	15	Relegated to 2nd Division

Source: rsssf.com

=== Eerste Klasse West-II ===
Pos	Team	Pld	W	D	L	GF	GA	GD	Pts	Qualification
1	Blauw-Wit Amsterdam	21	13	3	5	46	32	+14	29	Qualified for Championship play-off
2	De Volewijckers	21	13	1	7	62	43	+19	27	Transferred to West-I
3	HFC Haarlem	20	12	1	7	64	44	+20	25	Transferred to West-I
4	Xerxes	20	11	3	6	62	47	+15	25	Transferred to West-I
5	DFC	20	11	1	8	47	35	+12	23	
6	SC Neptunus	20	8	5	7	36	29	+7	21	Transferred to West-I
7	DOS	20	7	4	9	37	47	−10	18	
8	HBS Craeyenhout	20	7	2	11	34	39	−5	16	Transferred to West-I
9	Stormvogels	20	6	2	12	24	43	−19	14	
10	DHC Delft	20	5	4	11	29	58	−29	14	
11	SBV Excelsior	20	2	6	12	24	48	−24	10	

Source: rsssf.com

=== Championship play-off ===
Pos	Team	Pld	W	D	L	GF	GA	GD	Pts	Result	AJA	HEE	NEC	MVV	BVV	BWA
1	AFC Ajax	10	8	1	1	32	16	+16	17	Champion		3–3	5–1	3–1	2–0	4–3
2	sc Heerenveen	10	6	2	2	35	22	+13	14		0–2		6–2	2–2	3–0	3–1
3	NEC Nijmegen	10	3	3	4	21	32	−11	9		0–6	3–4		3–3	2–1	3–3
4	MVV Maastricht	10	1	5	4	19	24	−5	7		2–3	6–7	1–3		1–0	3–3
5	BVV Den Bosch	10	3	1	6	14	20	−6	7		5–2	3–2	2–3	0–0		0–3
6	Blauw-Wit Amsterdam	10	1	4	5	17	24	−7	6		1–2	0–5	1–1	0–0	2–3	

Source: rsssf.com
