= 1947–48 Netherlands Football League Championship =

Netherl. Football Championship
- Season: 1947–1948
- Champions: BVV Den Bosch (1st title)

The Netherlands Football League Championship 1947–1948 was contested by 66 teams participating in six divisions. The national champion was determined by a play-off between the winners of the eastern, northern, two southern and two western football divisions of the Netherlands. BVV Den Bosch won the championship by beating sc Heerenveen, Go Ahead, HFC EDO, HFC Haarlem and PSV Eindhoven.

== New entrants ==
Eerste Klasse East:

- Promoted from 2nd Division: Zwolsche Boys

Eerste Klasse South-I:

- Moving in from South-II: FC Eindhoven, Sittardse Boys, Juliana, Maurits and De Spechten
- Promoted from 2nd Division: VV TSC

Eerste Klasse South-II:

- Moving in from South-I: SC Helmondia, NAC, NOAD, VC Vlissingen and VVV Venlo

Eerste Klasse West-I:

- Moving in from West-II: HBS Craeyenhout, HFC Haarlem, SC Neptunus De Volewijckers and Xerxes
- Promoted from 2nd Division: Zeeburgia

Eerste Klasse West-II:

- Moving in from West-I: ADO Den Haag, DWS, HFC EDO, Feijenoord and Sparta Rotterdam

== Divisions ==
=== Eerste Klasse East ===
Pos	Team	Pld	W	D	L	GF	GA	GD	Pts	Qualification or relegation
1	Go Ahead	20	11	6	3	40	23	+17	28	Qualified for Championship play-off
2	Quick Nijmegen	20	9	9	2	41	20	+21	27	
3	AGOVV Apeldoorn	20	9	4	7	36	23	+13	22	
4	Heracles	20	9	4	7	32	27	+5	22	
5	FC Wageningen	20	9	4	7	28	32	−4	22	
6	NEC Nijmegen	20	8	4	8	37	35	+2	20	
7	SC Enschede	20	8	3	9	46	44	+2	19	
8	Enschedese Boys	20	5	9	6	27	35	−8	19	
9	Zwolsche Boys	20	5	8	7	29	30	−1	18	
10	Be Quick Zutphen	20	5	4	11	34	53	−19	14	
11	Vitesse Arnhem	20	3	3	14	23	51	−28	9	Relegated to 2nd Division

Source: rsssf.com

=== Eerste Klasse North ===
Pos	Team	Pld	W	D	L	GF	GA	GD	Pts	Qualification or relegation
1	sc Heerenveen	20	18	0	2	83	23	+60	36	Qualified for Championship play-off
2	Be Quick 1887	20	16	1	3	71	24	+47	33	
3	GVAV Rapiditas	20	9	6	5	43	36	+7	24	
4	LAC Frisia 1883	20	8	6	6	31	34	−3	22	
5	HSC	20	8	4	8	40	39	+1	20	
6	Velocitas 1897	20	7	4	9	28	33	−5	18	
7	Sneek Wit Zwart	20	5	8	7	32	45	−13	18	
8	FC Emmen	20	5	4	11	22	43	−21	14	
9	VV Leeuwarden	20	4	5	11	26	46	−20	13	
10	Achilles 1894	20	3	7	10	27	50	−23	13	
11	Veendam	20	2	5	13	26	56	−30	9	Relegated to 2nd Division

Source: rsssf.com

=== Eerste Klasse South-I ===
Pos	Team	Pld	W	D	L	GF	GA	GD	Pts	Qualification
1	BVV Den Bosch	20	12	3	5	58	21	+37	27	Qualified for Championship play-off
2	FC Eindhoven	20	10	6	4	38	29	+9	26	Transferred to South-II
3	Willem II	20	10	5	5	47	35	+12	25	
4	Sittardse Boys	20	8	7	5	29	25	+4	23	Transferred to South-II
5	Juliana	20	8	5	7	49	41	+8	21	
6	Maurits	20	8	5	7	39	42	−3	21	Transferred to South-II
7	De Spechten	20	7	4	9	36	48	−12	18	
8	LONGA	20	5	5	10	37	52	−15	15	Transferred to South-II
9	Baronie/DNL	20	5	5	10	35	51	−16	15	Transferred to South-II
10	VV TSC	20	5	5	10	37	54	−17	15	
11	HVV Helmond	20	5	4	11	35	42	−7	14	

Source: rsssf.com

=== Eerste Klasse South-II ===
Pos	Team	Pld	W	D	L	GF	GA	GD	Pts	Qualification or relegation
1	PSV Eindhoven	20	14	2	4	49	22	+27	30	Qualified for Championship play-off
2	NAC	20	12	2	6	47	31	+16	26	Transferred to South-I
3	SC Emma	20	10	4	6	34	27	+7	24	
4	MVV Maastricht	20	11	2	7	35	28	+7	24	Transferred to South-I
5	NOAD	20	10	4	6	27	27	0	24	
6	Limburgia	20	9	5	6	36	25	+11	23	Transferred to South-I
7	Bleijerheide	20	9	3	8	52	44	+8	21	
8	Brabantia	20	6	6	8	29	33	−4	18	Transferred to South-I
9	VVV Venlo	20	5	2	13	33	42	−9	12	Transferred to South-I
10	SC Helmondia	20	4	4	12	26	47	−21	12	
11	VC Vlissingen	20	2	2	16	16	58	−42	6	Relegated to 2nd Division

Source: rsssf.com

=== Eerste Klasse West-I ===
Pos	Team	Pld	W	D	L	GF	GA	GD	Pts	Qualification or relegation
1	HFC Haarlem	20	11	6	3	52	25	+27	28	Qualified for Championship play-off
2	Xerxes	20	10	7	3	50	30	+20	27	
3	AFC Ajax	20	7	7	6	38	31	+7	21	
4	VSV	20	8	4	8	46	47	−1	20	Transferred to West-II
5	HVV 't Gooi	20	7	5	8	36	33	+3	19	
6	Hermes DVS	20	6	7	7	38	39	−1	19	Transferred to West-II
7	Zeeburgia	20	6	7	7	32	35	−3	19	Transferred to West-II
8	SC Neptunus	20	7	5	8	30	40	−10	19	Transferred to West-II
9	De Volewijckers	20	7	4	9	35	34	+1	18	
10	HBS Craeyenhout	20	7	4	9	32	46	−14	18	Transferred to West-II
11	RFC Rotterdam	20	4	4	12	29	58	−29	12	Relegated to 2nd Division

Source: rsssf.com

=== Eerste Klasse West-II ===
Pos	Team	Pld	W	D	L	GF	GA	GD	Pts	Qualification or relegation
1	HFC EDO	21	13	5	3	33	18	+15	31	Qualified for Championship play-off
2	Feijenoord	21	13	3	5	44	21	+23	29	
3	DFC	20	11	4	5	43	27	+16	26	
4	DOS	20	10	4	6	44	29	+15	24	Transferred to West-I
5	DHC	20	7	6	7	32	41	−9	20	
6	Stormvogels	20	5	9	6	29	30	−1	19	Transferred to West-I
7	ADO Den Haag	20	6	7	7	23	31	−8	19	Transferred to West-I
8	Blauw-Wit Amsterdam	20	5	6	9	29	31	−2	16	Transferred to West-I
9	DWS	20	4	7	9	18	31	−13	15	
10	Sparta Rotterdam	20	5	4	11	29	40	−11	14	Transferred to West-I
11	SBV Excelsior	20	3	3	14	17	42	−25	9	Relegated to 2nd Division

Source: rsssf.com

=== Championship play-off ===
Pos	Team	Pld	W	D	L	GF	GA	GD	Pts	Result	BVV	HEE	GOA	EDO	HAA	PSV
1	BVV Den Bosch	10	6	2	2	18	10	+8	14	Champion		3–1	5–2	3–0	3–2	1–0
2	sc Heerenveen	10	6	1	3	26	20	+6	13		1–0		1–2	5–2	4–3	5–3
3	Go Ahead	10	5	2	3	21	20	+1	12		0–0	2–0		4–1	1–2	3–2
4	HFC EDO	10	3	4	3	16	19	−3	10		1–1	2–2	2–2		2–1	0–0
5	HFC Haarlem	10	3	0	7	18	22	−4	6		2–0	1–3	3–4	1–2		3–1
6	PSV Eindhoven	10	2	1	7	15	23	−8	5		1–2	2–4	4–1	0–4	2–0	

Source: rsssf.com
