= 2006–07 FC Emmen season =

Dutch football club season

FC Emmen
2006–07 season
- Stadium: De Oude Meerdijk
- Eerste Divisie: 11th
- KNVB Cup: 3rd round
- Top goalscorer: League: Sergio van Dijk (12 goals); All: Sergio van Dijk (12 goals)
- Biggest win: 4-0 BV Veendam (h) 35th week
- Biggest defeat: 5-0 (RBC Roosendaal (a) 25th week 6-1 (FC Volendam (a) 29th week)
- All statistics correct as of 27 April 2007.

The 2006–07 season marked FC Emmen's 22nd consecutive campaign in the Eerste Divisie, the second tier of Dutch football. The club also competed in the KNVB Cup, reaching the third round before suffering a 1–0 defeat against De Graafschap.

FC Emmen concluded the Eerste Divisie season in 11th place. Sergio van Dijk finished as the club's top scorer, netting 12 goals, all of which came in league competition.

== Competitions ==
=== Overall record ===
Competition	First match	Last match	Starting round	Final position	Record							
Competition	First match	Last match	Starting round	Final position	Pld	W	D	L	GF	GA	GD	Win %
Eerste Divisie	11 August 2006	27 April 2007	Week 1	11th	38	13	9	16	59	65	−6	34.21
KNVB Cup	19 September 2006	7 November 2006	2nd round	3rd round	2	1	0	1	1	2	−1	50.00
Total					40	14	9	17	60	67	−7	35.00

Last updated: 6 November 2026
Source: ESPN

=== Eerste Divisie ===
==== Results summary ====
Overall								Home						Away					
Pld	W	D	L	GF	GA	GD	Pts	W	D	L	GF	GA	GD	W	D	L	GF	GA	GD
38	13	9	16	59	65	−6	48	6	8	5	29	26	+3	7	1	11	30	39	−9

Last updated: 24 April 2026.

==== Results by round ====
Round	1	2	3	4	5	6	7	8	9	10	11	12	13	14	15	16	17	18	19	20	21	22	23	24	25	26	27	28	29	30	31	32	33	34	35	36	37	38
Ground	A	H	H	A	H	A	H	A	A	H	A	H	A	A	H	H	A	H	A	H	A	H	H	A	A	H	A	H	A	H	H	A	H	A	H	A	A	H
Result	D	W	D	L	L	L	D	W	W	L	W	D	L	W	D	D	W	W	L	W	L	D	W	L	L	L	W	D	L	L	D	L	W	L	W	W	L	L
Position																																						11

Source: https://www.espn.nl/voetbal/team/scorebord/_/id/3707/competitie/NED.2/season/2006/ ESPN
A = Away; H = Home; W = Win; D = Draw; L = Loss

=== Matches ===
==== 1st half ====
11 August 2006 1st week	BV Veendam	1–1	FC Emmen	Veendam
20:00	Martin Drent 70'	Report	Mourad Mghizrat 23'	Stadium: De Langeleegte

18 August 2006 2nd week	FC Emmen	3–2	AGOVV	Emmen
20:00	Mark Veldmate 2' 74'; Roy Stroeve 84'	Report	Sherjill Mac-Donald 26' 65'	Stadium: Unive Stadion

21 August 2006 3rd week	FC Emmen	1–1	TOP Oss	Emmen
20:00	Mourad Mghizrat 34'	Report	Martijn van Galen 45'	Stadium: Unive Stadion

25 August 2006 4th week	Almere City FC	5–3	FC Emmen	Almere
20:00	Nordin Amrabat 27'; Tom Kalkhuis 42'; Zenon Caravella 71'; Ergün Çakır 84'; Sander Duits 87'	Report	Roy Stroeve 1'; Mourad Mghizrat 48'; Rachid El Khalifi 90'	Stadium: Yanmar Stadion

1 September 2006 5th week	FC Emmen	0–3	De Graafschap	Emmen
20:00		Report	Joost Volmer 43'; Berry Powel 54'; Jhon van Beukering 87'	Stadium: Unive Stadion

25 August 2006 6th week	HFC Haarlem	2–1	FC Emmen	Haarlem
20:00	Samir El Gaaouiri 25'; Hendrik van Beelen 36'	Report	Geoffrey Verweij 74'	Stadium: Haarlem Stadion

15 September 2006 7th week	FC Emmen	1–1	Go Ahead Eagles	Emmen
20:00	Roy Stroeve 47'	Report	Sjoerd Ars 80'	Stadium: Unive Stadion

22 September 2006 8th week	FC Eindhoven	1–4	FC Emmen	Eindhoven
20:00	Kristof Aelbrecht 55'	Report	Roy Stroeve 2' 37'; Jannes Wolters 68'; Geoffrey Verweij 82'	Stadium: Eindhoven Stadion

29 September 2006 9th week	SC Cambuur	0–2	FC Emmen	Leeuwarden
20:00		Report	Geoffrey Verweij 73'; Mourad Mghizrat 48'	Stadium: Cambuur Stadion

6 October 2006 10th week	FC Emmen	0–1	SC Telstar	Emmen
20:00		Report	Jan Bruin 69'	Stadium: Unive Stadion

13 October 2006 11th week	Helmond Sport	0–5	FC Emmen	Helmond
20:00		Report	Roy Stroeve 13' 53'; Rachid El Khalifi 48'; Mourad Mghizrat 57'; Niki Leferink 70'	Stadium: Stadion De Braak

20 October 2006 12th week	FC Emmen	1–1	FC Dordrecht	Emmen
20:00	Niki Leferink 58'	Report	Cecilio Lopes 71'	Stadium: Unive Stadion

23 October 2006 13th week	PEC Zwolle	3–0	FC Emmen	Zwolle
20:00	Anton Jongsma 8'; Jordy Zuidam 20'; Silvino Soares 71'	Report		Stadium: Oosterenkstadion

27 October 2006 14th week	Fortuna Sittard	0–4	FC Emmen	Sittard
20:00		Report	Roy Stroeve 66'; Niki Leferink 68' 77'; Sergio van Dijk 84'	Stadium: Fortuna Sittard Stadion

3 November 2006 15th week	FC Emmen	2–2	RBC Roosendaal	Emmen
20:00	Sergio van Dijk 15'; Roy Stroeve 68'	Report	Danny Guijt 18' 28'	Stadium: Unive Stadion

10 November 2006 16th week	FC Emmen	2–2	FC Volendam	Emmen
20:00	Rachid El Khalifi 20'; Sergio van Dijk 76'	Report	Xavier Amanda 60'; Charles Dissels 70'	Stadium: Unive Stadion

17 November 2006 17th week	MVV Maastricht	1–3	FC Emmen	Maastricht
20:00	Aziz Moutawakil 68'	Report	Niki Leferink 38'; Sergio van Dijk 63'; Jannes Wolters 66'	Stadium: De Geusselt

24 November 2006 18th week	FC Emmen	3–0	FC Den Bosch	Emmen
20:00	Niki Leferink 51'; Sergio van Dijk 60' 86'	Report		Stadium: Unive Stadion

1 December 2006 19th week	VVV-Venlo	1–0	FC Emmen	Venlo
20:00	Dirk Jan Derksen 61'	Report		Stadium: De Koel

8 December 2006 20th week	FC Emmen	2–1	Helmond Sport	Emmen
20:00	Sergio van Dijk 14'; Mourad Mghizrat 71'	Report	Dave Osei 76'	Stadium: Unive Stadion

15 December 2006 21st week	FC Dordrecht	2–0	FC Emmen	Dordrecht
20:00	Cecilio Lopes 35'; Manu Dagher 74'	Report		Stadium: Stadion Krommedijk

22 December 2006 22nd week	FC Emmen	3–3	PEC Zwolle	Emmen
20:00	Geoffrey Verweij 19' 72'; Rachid El Khalifi 25'	Report	Silvino Soares 17'; Albert van der Haar 84'; Tjeerd Korf 90'	Stadium: Unive Stadion

==== 2nd half ====
12 January 2007 23rd week	FC Emmen	3–2	FC Eindhoven	Emmen
20:00	Mourad Mghizrat 51' 88'; Chris van der Weerden 76' (o.g.)	Report	Kristof Aelbrecht 55'; Rik van de Langenberg 70'	Stadium: Unive Stadion

19 January 2007 24th week	Go Ahead Eagles	2–0	FC Emmen	Deventer
20:00	Sjoerd Ars 27' 43'	Report		Stadium: De Adelaarshorst

27 January 2007 25th week	RBC Roosendaal	5–0	FC Emmen	Roosendaal
19:30	Paul de Lange 8'; Benjamin Martha 13' 14'; Sven Delanoy 21'; Henk Vos 60'	Report		Stadium: RBC Stadion

2 February 2007 26th week	FC Emmen	0–1	SC Cambuur	Emmen
20:00		Report	Chris de Wagt 71'	Stadium: Unive Stadion

9 February 2007 27th week	SC Telstar	1–2	FC Emmen	Velsen-Zuid
20:00	Jan Bruin 69'	Report	Mark Veldmate 52'; Mourad Mghizrat 74'	Stadium: Sportpark Schoonenberg; Attendance: 1,245

16 February 2007 28th week	FC Emmen	0–0	MVV Maastricht	Emmen
20:00		Report		Stadium: Unive Stadion

23 February 2007 29th week	FC Volendam	6–1	FC Emmen	Volendam
20:00	Bernard Hofstede 28'; Charles Dissels 61' 85'; Jack Tuyp 65'; Rowin van Zaanen 82'; Luciano Dompig 90'	Report	Mourad Mghizrat 59'	Stadium: Kras Stadion; Attendance: 2,523

2 March 2007 30th week	FC Emmen	0–2	Fortuna Sittard	Emmen
20:00		Report	Jürgen Heinrichs 38'; Florencio Cornelia 77' 85'	Stadium: Unive Stadion; Attendance: 2,887

9 March 2007 31st week	FC Emmen	1–1	HFC Haarlem	Emmen
20:00	Rachid El Khalifi 50'	Report	Achmed Ahahaoui 14'	Stadium: Unive Stadion

16 March 2007 32nd week	TOP Oss	4–0	FC Emmen	Oss
20:00	Rik van de Langenberg 2'; Revy Rosalia 16'; Wouter van den Herik 44'; Alexander Prent 74'	Report		Stadium: TOP Oss Stadion; Attendance: 1,916

23 March 2007 33rd week	FC Emmen	2–1	Almere City FC	Emmen
20:00	Roy Stroeve 6'; Sergio van Dijk 49'	Report	Richard Haklander 64'	Stadium: Unive Stadion; Attendance: 3,268

30 March 2007 34th week	De Graafschap	2–1	FC Emmen	Doetinchem
20:00	Jeffrey de Visscher 79'; Jhonny van Beukering 89'	Report	Mourad Mghizrat 33'	Stadium: De Vijverberg; Attendance: 11,500

6 April 2007 35th week	FC Emmen	4–0	BV Veendam	Emmen
20:00	Roy Stroeve 29'; Sergio van Dijk 58' 74'; Paul Weerman 90'	Report		Stadium: Unive Stadion

13 April 2007 36th week	AGOVV	0–3	FC Emmen	Apeldoorn
20:00		Report	Sergio van Dijk 7'; Mark Bevaart 66'; Frank Karreman 86'	Stadium: Sportpark Berg & Bos; Attendance: 1,154; Referee: Hessel Steegstra

20 April 2007 37th week	FC Den Bosch	3–0	FC Emmen	's-Hertogenbosch
20:00	Paul Beekmans 14'; Kiran Bechan 45'; Anthony Lurling 49'	Report		Stadium: De Vliert; Attendance: 3,821; Referee: Ed Janssen

27 April 2007 38th week	FC Emmen	1–2	VVV-Venlo	Emmen
20:00	Sergio van Dijk 31'	Report	Angelo Zimmerman 57' (o.g.); Willem Janssen 78'	Stadium: Unive Stadion; Attendance: 5,211

=== KNVB Cup ===
19 September 2006 2nd round	FC Emmen	1–0	PEC Zwolle	Emmen
20:00	Geoffrey Verweij 79'			Stadium: Unive Stadion

7 November 2006 3rd round	De Graafschap	1–0	FC Emmen	Doetinchem
20:00	Jhonny van Beukering 7'	Report		Stadium: De Vijverberg

== Statistics ==
=== Scorers ===
#	Player	Eerste Divisie	KNVB	Total
1	(Indonesia) Sergio van Dijk	12	0	12
2	(Morocco) Mourad Mghizrat	11	0	11
2	(Netherlands) Roy Stroeve	11	0	11
4	(Netherlands) Geoffrey Verweij	5	1	6
5	(Netherlands) Niki Leferink	5	0	5
5	(Netherlands) Rachid El Khalifi	5	0	5
7	(Netherlands) Mark Veldmate	3	0	3
8	(Netherlands) Jannes Wolters	2	0	2
9	(Netherlands) Frank Karreman	1	0	1
9	(Netherlands) Mark Bevaart	1	0	1
9	(Netherlands) Paul Weerman	1	0	1
