= IJsselderby =

Football rivalry in the Netherlands

- Other names: Go Ahead Eagles vs PEC Zwolle
- Location: Netherlands
- Teams: Go Ahead Eagles; PEC Zwolle
- First meeting: PEC Zwolle 3–3 Go Ahead Eagles; 1929–30 Eerste Klasse
- Latest meeting: PEC Zwolle 0–2 Go Ahead Eagles; 2025–26 Eredivisie (21 September 2025)
- Stadiums: De Adelaarshorst (Go Ahead Eagles); MAC³PARK Stadion (PEC Zwolle)

Statistics
- Total meetings: 110
- Most wins: PEC Zwolle (47)
- All-time series: PEC Zwolle: 47; Drawn: 22; Go Ahead Eagles: 41
- Largest victory: Go Ahead Eagles 8–2 PEC Zwolle; 1942–43 Eerste Klasse

The IJsselderby is a football derby between the Dutch clubs Go Ahead Eagles from Deventer, and PEC Zwolle from Zwolle.

Supporters often call Go Ahead Eagles ‘Kowet’ (Dialect for Go Ahead) and PEC Zwolle simply ‘PEC’.

The rivalry between the clubs started when they competed in the Eerste Divisie in the 1990s. Until the 1990s, Go Ahead Eagles played in the Eredivisie most of the time and is the more successful of both clubs winning the national championship in 1917, 1922, 1930 and 1933. PEC Zwolle later gained success, winning the KNVB Cup in 2013–14, and the Johan Cruyff Shield in 2014. Go Ahead Eagles won the 2024-25 KNVB Cup.

Deventer and Zwolle are both situated along the river IJssel. The distance between the two cities is about 28 kilometers (17 miles). Go Ahead Eagles supporters call their rivals ‘Olle’, as Zwolle sounds too disgusting for them and Zwolle fans call their rivals ‘Egels’ ('hedgehogs'). There have been several fights between the supporters of the two clubs. It is known as one of the fiercest derbies in the Netherlands, along with Feyenoord – Ajax (De Klassieker), NEC – Vitesse (Gelderse Derby) and SC Heerenveen – SC Cambuur (Friesche Derby).

== Results ==
Season	Competition	Winner	Game	Result	Goalscorers	
Season	Competition	Winner	Game	Result	PEC Zwolle	Go Ahead Eagles
1929–30	Eerste Klasse	Tied	PEC - Go Ahead	3–3	Huub Pallandt (2x), Philip de Bruin	Theo de Kreek, Herman Brilleman, Roelof de Vries
1929–30	Eerste Klasse	Go Ahead	Go Ahead - PEC	6–1	Huub Pallandt	Roelof de Vries (3x), Jan de Kreek (2x), Theo de Kreek
1930–31	Eerste Klasse	PEC	PEC - Go Ahead	1–0	Huub Pallandt	–
1930–31	Eerste Klasse	PEC	Go Ahead - PEC	1–4	Huub Pallandt (2x), Tom Knuppel, Lourents van de Bend	Jan de Kreek
1930–31	Championshipgame	Go Ahead	Go Ahead – PEC	2–1	Jan van der Meulen	Jan de Kreek (2x)
1931–32	Eerste Klasse	PEC	PEC - Go Ahead	4–1	Lulof Heetjans (2x), Coen van Brummen, Bas Doorneweert	Cornelis Vos
1931–32	Eerste Klasse	PEC	Go Ahead - PEC	1–2	Huub Pallandt, Jan Manni	Roelof de Vries
1932–33	Eerste Klasse	Go Ahead	PEC - Go Ahead	1–3	Wim Velthuizen	Jan de Kreek, Matena, Richard Buiting
1932–33	Eerste Klasse	PEC	Go Ahead - PEC	1–2	De Bruyn, Philip de Bruyn	Jan de Kreek
1933–34	Eerste Klasse	Go Ahead	PEC - Go Ahead	0–3	–	Jan Halle, Henny Koopman, Roelof de Vries
1933–34	Eerste Klasse	Go Ahead	Go Ahead - PEC	3–1	Kaiser	Jan de Kreek (2x), Henny Koopman
1934–35	Eerste Klasse	Go Ahead	PEC - Go Ahead	0–3	–	Herman Koopman (2x), Theo de Kreek
1934–35	Eerste Klasse	PEC	Go Ahead - PEC	0–2	Theo Eikenaar, Lulof Heetjans	–
1935–36	Eerste Klasse	Tied	PEC - Go Ahead	1–1	Jan van der Meulen	Harry Wagenvoort
1935–36	Eerste Klasse	Go Ahead	Go Ahead - PEC	1–0	–	Henny Koopman
1936–37	Eerste Klasse	PEC	PEC - Go Ahead	3–0	Pallandt (2x), Jan van der Meulen	–
1936–37	Eerste Klasse	Go Ahead	Go Ahead - PEC	3–0	–	Roelof de Vries (2x), Herman Koopman
1937–38	Eerste Klasse	Go Ahead	PEC - Go Ahead	0–1	–	Jan Kolkman
1937–38	Eerste Klasse	Go Ahead	Go Ahead - PEC	3–0	–	Kieftenbelt, Jan Kolkman, Herman Koopman
1940–41	Promotiecompetitie	PEC	PEC - Go Ahead	2–0	Cornelis Mulder, Harry Kliphuis	–
1940–41	Promotiecompetitie	Tied	Go Ahead - PEC	2–2	Frans Tausch, Cornelis Mulder	Herman Koopman, Piet Vogelzang (o.g.)
1942–43	Eerste Klasse	Go Ahead	PEC - Go Ahead	2–5	Cornelis Mulder (2x)	Harry Wagenvoort, Henny Koopman, Roelofs, Roelof de Vries, Kees Kerkdijk
1942–43	Eerste Klasse	Go Ahead	Go Ahead - PEC	8–2	Frans Tausch, Jan Doorneweert	Kees Kerkdijk (4x), Roelofs (2x), Henny Koopman (2x)
1943–44	Eerste Klasse	Go Ahead	PEC - Go Ahead	0–1	–	Jan Kolkman
1943–44	Eerste Klasse	Go Ahead	Go Ahead - PEC	4–0	–	Jan Kolkman (2x), Henny Koopman, Bloemendal
1945–46	Eerste Klasse	Go Ahead	PEC - Go Ahead	1–4	Unknown	Unknown
1945–46	Eerste Klasse	Go Ahead	Go Ahead - PEC	6–1	Unknown	Unknown
Promotion to the professional football league system
1955–56	Eerste Klasse	PEC	PEC - Go Ahead	4–3	Joop Schuman (2x), Jan Tielbaard, Jan Horst	Jan ten Wolde 2x, Herman Strokappe
1955–56	Eerste Klasse	Tied	Go Ahead - PEC	2–2	Thijs van der Graaf (2x)	Eef Wink (o.g.), Jan ten Wolde
1956–57	Tweede Divisie	PEC	PEC - Go Ahead	5–2	Jan Horst (3x), Bennie Nijboer, Gerrit Brouwer	Joop Butter, Henk Strokappe
1956–57	Tweede Divisie	Go Ahead	Go Ahead - PEC	3–0	–	Tonny van Gelder (2x), Joop Butter
1957–58	Tweede Divisie	Tied	PEC - Go Ahead	1–1	Gerrit van der Weerthof	Jan ten Wolde
1957–58	Tweede Divisie	Go Ahead	Go Ahead - PEC	4–2	Jan Horst, Jan Tielbaard	Willy Mos (3x), Jan Groninger
1958–59	Tweede Divisie	Go Ahead	PEC - Go Ahead	1–2	Leo Koopman	Joop Butter, Jan Groninger
1958–59	Tweede Divisie	Go Ahead	Go Ahead - PEC	3–1	Leo Koopman	Willy Mos (3x)
1960–61	KNVB Cup	PEC	Go Ahead - PEC	4–5	Leo Koopman (3x), Dirk van de Wetering (2x)	Frank Ensink, Henk van Brussel, Henk ten Brink, Joop Butter
1963–64	KNVB Cup	Go Ahead	PEC - Go Ahead	1–2	Wannie Sterken	Egbert ter Mors, Gerrit Niehaus
1967–68	KNVB Cup	Go Ahead	Go Ahead - PEC	3–0	–	Koos Knoef, Gerrit Niehaus, Jan Veenstra
1978–79	Eredivisie	Tied	PEC Zwolle - Go Ahead Eagles	1–1	Tjeerd van 't Land	Dick Schneider
1978–79	Eredivisie	Tied	Go Ahead Eagles - PEC Zwolle	2–2	Carry Steinvoort, Jesper Rasmussen	Jo Körver, Jan Groeneweg
1979–80	Eredivisie	PEC Zwolle	PEC Zwolle - Go Ahead Eagles	2–1	Koko Hoekstra, Ron Jans	Henk ten Cate
1979–80	Eredivisie	Tied	Go Ahead Eagles - PEC Zwolle	0–0	–	–
1980–81	Eredivisie	PEC Zwolle	PEC Zwolle - Go Ahead Eagles	2–0	John Frandsen, Peter van der Hengst	–
1980–81	Eredivisie	Tied	Go Ahead Eagles - PEC Zwolle	3–3	Klaas Drost, Rinus Israël, Ron Jans	John Oude Wesselink, Cees van Kooten
1980–81	KNVB Cup	Go Ahead Eagles	PEC Zwolle - Go Ahead Eagles	1–2	Ron Jans	Cees van Kooten, Dick Schneider
1980–81	KNVB Cup	Tied	Go Ahead Eagles - PEC Zwolle	1–1	Koko Hoekstra	Cees van Kooten
1981–82	Eredivisie	PEC Zwolle	PEC Zwolle - Go Ahead Eagles	3–0	Alex Booy, Jan Hendriksen, Peter van der Hengst	–
1981–82	Eredivisie	Tied	Go Ahead Eagles - PEC Zwolle	2–2	John Holshuijsen, John Delamere	Gerdo Hazelhekke (2x)
1982–83	Eredivisie	Go Ahead Eagles	PEC Zwolle - Go Ahead Eagles	0–1	–	Henk ten Cate
1982–83	Eredivisie	Go Ahead Eagles	Go Ahead Eagles - PEC Zwolle	2–1	Cees van Kooten	Ton Witbaard (2x)
1983–84	Eredivisie	Tied	PEC Zwolle '82 - Go Ahead Eagles	1–1	Cees van Kooten	Eddy Bosman
1983–84	Eredivisie	Go Ahead Eagles	Go Ahead Eagles - PEC Zwolle '82	2–0	–	Eddy Bosman, Wim Woudsma
1984–85	Eredivisie	PEC Zwolle '82	PEC Zwolle '82 - Go Ahead Eagles	1–0	Peter van der Hengst	–
1984–85	Eredivisie	Go Ahead Eagles	Go Ahead Eagles - PEC Zwolle '82	4–0	–	Peter Brouwer (2x), Wim Woudsma, Mike Small
1984–85	KNVB Cup	Go Ahead Eagles	Go Ahead Eagles - PEC Zwolle '82	2–1	Jürgen Müller	Unknown
1986–87	Eredivisie	Tied	PEC Zwolle '82 - Go Ahead Eagles	1–1	Henny Verschoor	Michel Boerebach
1986–87	Eredivisie	PEC Zwolle '82	Go Ahead Eagles - PEC Zwolle '82	0–3	Foeke Booy, Edwin van Ankeren, Tjalling Dilling (o.g.)	–
1989–90	Eerste Divisie	Go Ahead Eagles	PEC Zwolle '82 - Go Ahead Eagles	0–2	–	Unknown
1989–90	Eerste Divisie	PEC Zwolle '82	Go Ahead Eagles - PEC Zwolle '82	0–1	Unknown	–
1990–91	Eerste Divisie	FC Zwolle	FC Zwolle - Go Ahead Eagles	2–1	Max Huiberts (2x)	Stanley de Haas
1990–91	Eerste Divisie	Go Ahead Eagles	Go Ahead Eagles - FC Zwolle	4–2	Richard Roelofsen, Edwin Duim	Gert van den Brink, Marthijn Pothoven, Marc Overmars, Paul Bosvelt
1991–92	Eerste Divisie	FC Zwolle	FC Zwolle - Go Ahead Eagles	2–0	Martin Reynders, Edwin Timmerman	–
1991–92	Eerste Divisie	Go Ahead Eagles	Go Ahead Eagles - FC Zwolle	3–1	Henk Buimer	Jeroen Boere (2x), Marco Heering
1994–95	KNVB Cup	Go Ahead Eagles	FC Zwolle - Go Ahead Eagles	1–2	Henri van der Vegt	Marthijn Pothoven, Dennis Hulshoff
1996–97	Eerste Divisie	FC Zwolle	FC Zwolle - Go Ahead Eagles	2–0	André van Tuinen, Claus Boekweg	–
1996–97	Eerste Divisie	FC Zwolle	Go Ahead Eagles - FC Zwolle	0–1	Jan Bruin	–
1997–98	Eerste Divisie	FC Zwolle	FC Zwolle - Go Ahead Eagles	4–1	Arne Slot, Jan Bruin, Harry Sinkgraven, Claus Boekweg	Marcel Muhlack
1997–98	Eerste Divisie	Tied	Go Ahead Eagles - FC Zwolle	3–3	Jan Bruin, André van Tuinen, Arjan Bosschaart	Jochem de Weerdt (2x), Jan Michels
1998–99	Eerste Divisie	FC Zwolle	FC Zwolle - Go Ahead Eagles	3–1	Sieme Zijm, Gerald van den Belt, Sami Ristilä	Bram Marbus
1998–99	Eerste Divisie	FC Zwolle	Go Ahead Eagles - FC Zwolle	2–3	Arne Slot (2x), Robert Wijnands	Hendrie Krüzen, John Stegeman
1998–99	KNVB Cup	FC Zwolle	FC Zwolle - Go Ahead Eagles	5–2	Dirk Jan Derksen (2x), Marco Roelofsen, Arne Slot, Patrick Peelen (o.g.)	Unknown
1999–2000	Eerste Divisie	Tied	FC Zwolle - Go Ahead Eagles	1–1	Arne Slot	Mike Zonneveld
1999–2000	Eerste Divisie	FC Zwolle	Go Ahead Eagles - FC Zwolle	2–3	Dirk-Jan Derksen, Arjan Bosschaart, Ignacio Tuhuteru	John Stegeman, Dick Kooijman
2000–01	Eerste Divisie	FC Zwolle	FC Zwolle - Go Ahead Eagles	4–1	Gerald van den Belt, Arne Slot, Henk van Steeg, Arjan Bosschaart	Hans van Arum
2000–01	Eerste Divisie	FC Zwolle	Go Ahead Eagles - FC Zwolle	0–2	Claus Boekweg, Richard Roelofsen	–
2001–02	Eerste Divisie	FC Zwolle	FC Zwolle - Go Ahead Eagles	4–1	Arjan Bosschaart, Robert Wijnands, Arne Slot, Dominggus Lim-Duan	Niki Leferink
2001–02	Eerste Divisie	FC Zwolle	Go Ahead Eagles - FC Zwolle	0–1	Henk van Steeg	–
2002–03	Nacompetitie	FC Zwolle	FC Zwolle - Go Ahead Eagles	2–1	Arjan Bosschaart, Marco Roelofsen	Hubert Dijk
2002–03	Nacompetitie	FC Zwolle	Go Ahead Eagles - FC Zwolle	2–3	Dominggus Lim-Duan, Albert van der Haar, Ivan Tsvetkov	Dick Kooijman, Bram Marbus
2004–05	Eerste Divisie	FC Zwolle	FC Zwolle - Go Ahead Eagles	2–1	Bert Zuurman, Ruud Berger	Ignacio Tuhuteru
2004–05	Eerste Divisie	Go Ahead Eagles	Go Ahead Eagles - FC Zwolle	4–2	Ruud Berger, Ivar van Dinteren	Marco Parnela, Wouter van den Herik, Coen Zwollo, Niels Kokmeijer
2005–06	Eerste Divisie	FC Zwolle	FC Zwolle - Go Ahead Eagles	4–0	Dion Esajas (2x), Tjeerd Korf, Ivar van Dinteren	–
2005–06	Eerste Divisie	Tied	Go Ahead Eagles - FC Zwolle	1–1	Santi Kolk	Sjors Brugge
2006–07	Eerste Divisie	FC Zwolle	FC Zwolle - Go Ahead Eagles	3–0	Duncan van Moll, Anco Jansen, Silvino Soares	–
2006–07	Eerste Divisie	Tied	Go Ahead Eagles - FC Zwolle	1–1	Tjeerd Korf	Sjoerd Ars
2007–08	Eerste Divisie	FC Zwolle	FC Zwolle - Go Ahead Eagles	1–0	Albert van der Haar	–
2007–08	Eerste Divisie	Go Ahead Eagles	Go Ahead Eagles - FC Zwolle	3–1	Danny Holla	Orlando Smeekes (2x), Achmed Ahahaoui
2007–08	KNVB Cup	FC Zwolle	FC Zwolle - Go Ahead Eagles	1–0	Marcel Kleizen	–
2008–09	Eerste Divisie	FC Zwolle	FC Zwolle - Go Ahead Eagles	1–0	Albert van der Haar	–
2008–09	Eerste Divisie	FC Zwolle	Go Ahead Eagles - FC Zwolle	0–1	Derk Boerrigter	–
2009–10	Eerste Divisie	FC Zwolle	FC Zwolle - Go Ahead Eagles	1–0	Danny Schreurs	–
2009–10	Eerste Divisie	Go Ahead Eagles	Go Ahead Eagles - FC Zwolle	1–0	–	Jules Reimerink
2010–11	Eerste Divisie	FC Zwolle	FC Zwolle - Go Ahead Eagles	3–1	Sjoerd Ars (3x)	Joep van den Ouweland
2010–11	Eerste Divisie	FC Zwolle	Go Ahead Eagles - PEC Zwolle	1–3	Sjoerd Ars (2x), Arne Slot	Koen van der Biezen
2011–12	Eerste Divisie	Tied	FC Zwolle - Go Ahead Eagles	0–0	–	–
2011–12	Eerste Divisie	FC Zwolle	Go Ahead Eagles - FC Zwolle	0–1	Bart van Hintum	–
2012–13	KNVB Cup	PEC Zwolle	Go Ahead Eagles - PEC Zwolle	2–3 (e.t.)	Fred Benson (2x), Youness Mokhtar	Xander Houtkoop, Cas Peters
2013–14	Eredivisie	PEC Zwolle	PEC Zwolle - Go Ahead Eagles	2–0	Jesper Drost, Guyon Fernandez	–
2013–14	Eredivisie	Go Ahead Eagles	Go Ahead Eagles - PEC Zwolle	4–1	Stefan Nijland	Doke Schmidt, Erik Falkenburg, Jarchinio Antonia, Jop van der Linden
2014–15	Eredivisie	Go Ahead Eagles	PEC Zwolle - Go Ahead Eagles	0–1	–	Jeffrey Rijsdijk
2014–15	Eredivisie	Go Ahead Eagles	Go Ahead Eagles - PEC Zwolle	3–2	Stefan Nijland, Tomáš Necid	Jeffrey Rijsdijk, Fernando Lewis, Bart Vriends
2016–17	Eredivisie	PEC Zwolle	PEC Zwolle - Go Ahead Eagles	3–1	Queensy Menig, Mustafa Saymak, Danny Holla	Sander Fischer
2016–17	Eredivisie	PEC Zwolle	Go Ahead Eagles - PEC Zwolle	1–3	Queensy Menig, Django Warmerdam, Bram van Polen	Pedro Chirivella
2021–22	Eredivisie	Go Ahead Eagles	Go Ahead Eagles - PEC Zwolle	1–0		Giannis Fivos Botos
2021–22	Eredivisie	Go Ahead Eagles	PEC Zwolle - Go Ahead Eagles	0–1		Philippe Rommens
2023–24	Eredivisie	Tied	PEC Zwolle - Go Ahead Eagles	1–1	Eliano Reijnders	Oliver Edvardsen
2023–24	Eredivisie	Tied	Go Ahead Eagles - PEC Zwolle	1–1	Lennart Thy	Mats Deijl
2024–25	Eredivisie	Tied	Go Ahead Eagles - PEC Zwolle	2–2	Davy van den Berg, Jamiro Monteiro	Oliver Edvardsen, Enric Llansana
2024–25	Eredivisie	Tied	PEC Zwolle - Go Ahead Eagles	1–1	Younes Namli	Evert Linthorst
2025–26	Eredivisie	Go Ahead Eagles	PEC Zwolle - Go Ahead Eagles	0–2		Milan Smit (2)
2025–26	Eredivisie	Go Ahead Eagles	Go Ahead Eagles - PEC Zwolle	5–0		Stefán Sigurðarson, Søren Tengstedt, Victor Edvardsen, Aske Adelgaard, Mathis Suray
2026–27	Eredivisie	PEC Zwolle	PEC Zwolle - Go Ahead Eagles	4–1	Thijs Oosting (2), Sydney van Hooijdonk, Koen Kostons	Stefán Sigurðarson
Season	Competition	Winner	Game	Result	PEC Zwolle	Go Ahead Eagles
Season	Competition	Winner	Game	Result	Goalscorers	

== Statistics ==
Gamestatistics
Winner	Competition	Games	PEC	Tie	GAE	GPEC	GGAE
Go Ahead Eagles	Eredivisie	29	8	11	10	38	39
Go Ahead Eagles	Eerste klasse	26	8	3	15	37	67
PEC Zwolle	Eerste Divisie	34	23	5	6	64	35
Go Ahead Eagles	Tweede Divisie	6	1	1	4	10	15
Go Ahead Eagles	KNVB Cup	10	4	1	5	19	20
PEC Zwolle	Nacompetitie	2	2	0	0	5	3
PEC Zwolle	Promotiecompetitie	2	1	1	0	4	2
Go Ahead Eagles	Championshipgame	1	0	0	1	1	2
PEC Zwolle	TOTAL	110	47	22	41	178	183
The chart has been updated till the game on 21 September 2025.
