= 2005–06 Eerste Divisie =

50th season of the second-tier football league in Netherlands

Eerste Divisie
- Season: 2005–06
- Champions: Excelsior
- Promoted: Excelsior

The 2005–06 season of the Eerste Divisie began on August 12, 2005 and ended on April 7, 2006. The title was won by Excelsior Rotterdam.

== Promoted teams ==
The following team was promoted to the Eredivisie at the end of the season:

- Excelsior Rotterdam (champion)

== Newly admitted teams ==
These teams were relegated from the Eredivisie at the start of the season:

- De Graafschap (17th position, relegated through playoffs)
- FC Den Bosch (18th position)

The following team was admitted to the Eerste Divisie at the start of the season:

- FC Omniworld

== League standings ==
Pos	Team	Pld	W	D	L	GF	GA	GD	Pts	Promotion or qualification
1	Excelsior Rotterdam (C, P)	38	22	9	7	68	25	+43	75	Promotion to the Eredivisie
2	VVV-Venlo	38	20	8	10	53	34	+19	68	Qualification for promotion play-offs Second Round
3	FC Volendam	38	19	9	10	59	43	+16	66	Qualification for promotion play-offs Second Round
4	Helmond Sport	38	19	7	12	62	55	+7	64	Qualification for promotion play-offs Second Round
5	De Graafschap	38	17	11	10	63	51	+12	62	Qualification for promotion play-offs Second Round
6	FC Emmen	38	18	6	14	68	56	+12	60	
7	FC Den Bosch	38	16	11	11	62	51	+11	59	
8	HFC Haarlem	38	17	8	13	57	51	+6	59	Qualification for promotion play-offs First Round
9	FC Dordrecht	38	15	11	12	61	45	+16	56	
10	AGOVV Apeldoorn	38	17	5	16	64	62	+2	56	Qualification for promotion play-offs First Round
11	TOP Oss	38	15	10	13	51	53	−2	55	Qualification for promotion play-offs First Round
12	FC Zwolle	38	15	9	14	57	52	+5	54	Qualification for promotion play-offs First Round
13	MVV	38	13	12	13	53	52	+1	51	
14	BV Veendam	38	14	9	15	54	60	−6	51	
15	Cambuur Leeuwarden	38	12	14	12	48	50	−2	47 (Note: Cambuur received a deduction of three points.)	
16	Stormvogels Telstar	38	9	13	16	37	53	−16	40	
17	FC Eindhoven	38	11	6	21	53	65	−12	39	
18	Go Ahead Eagles	38	8	11	19	45	70	−25	35	
19	FC Omniworld	38	7	8	23	50	87	−37	29	
20	Fortuna Sittard	38	2	11	25	35	85	−50	17	

(C) Champions; (P) Promoted

=== Period winners ===
The competition is divided into six periods (Dutch: periode) of six matches each. The winner of each period (Dutch: periodekampioen) qualifies for the playoffs at the end of the season. If the winner of a period has already won a prior period in the season, the second placed team in the period is awarded the playoff slot. If the second placed team has also won a prior period, no winner is called, and the playoff slot is decided by league standing at the end of the season. If a team that has won a period goes on to win the league title and secure promotion to the Eredivisie, the playoff spot is awarded to the highest placed team on the final league standings that hasn't already qualified for the playoffs.

Period	Team	Pld	W	D	L	GF	GA	GD	Pts
1	FC Volendam	6	5	1	0	13	2	+11	16
2	FC Zwolle	6	6	0	0	14	1	+13	18
3	TOP Oss	6	4	2	0	11	5	+6	14
4	Excelsior Rotterdam	6	4	2	0	15	3	+12	14
5	HFC Haarlem	6	5	1	0	17	3	+14	16
6	AGOVV Apeldoorn	6	5	1	0	13	4	+9	16

== Playoffs ==
Round 1

Team 1	Agg.	Team 2	1st leg	2nd leg
FC Zwolle	4–2	HFC Haarlem	1–1	3–1
TOP Oss	5–0	AGOVV	3–0	2–0

Round 2 (best of 3)

Team 1	Pts	Team 2	1st leg	2nd leg	3rd leg
TOP Oss	5–2	NAC	0–0	2–2	1–3 (aet)
De Graafschap	4–1	VVV	1–1	4–2	Not played
Helmond Sport	3–6	FC Volendam	0–1	3–2	1–2 (aet)
FC Zwolle	0–6	Willem II	2–4	2–6	Not played

Round 3 (best of 3)

Team 1	Pts	Team 2	1st leg	2nd leg	3rd leg
De Graafschap	1-3	Willem II	0–1	1–2	Not played
FC Volendam	1–2	NAC	1–2	0–0	Not played

No team was promoted to the Eredivisie.

== Top scorers ==
Goals	Player	Team
19	(Netherlands) Santi Kolk	FC Zwolle
19	(Netherlands) Berry Powel	FC Den Bosch
18	(Indonesia) Sergio van Dijk	FC Emmen
18	(Netherlands) Mourad Mghizrat	FC Emmen
17	(Netherlands) Sjoerd Ars	FC Omniworld
17	(Nigeria) Wasiu Taiwo	Fortuna Sittard
16	(Spain) Gonzalo García García	AGOVV Apeldoorn
15	(Netherlands) Ruud ter Heide	AGOVV Apeldoorn
15	(Netherlands) Cecilio Lopes	FC Dordrecht
15	(Netherlands) Hilmi Mihci	FC Den Bosch
15	(Netherlands) Jack Tuyp	FC Volendam

== Attendances ==
#	Club	Average
1	De Graafschap	7,548
2	MVV	4,811
3	VVV	4,789
4	Emmen	3,762
5	Cambuur	3,600
6	Den Bosch	3,462
7	Zwolle	3,269
8	Veendam	2,993
9	Helmond	2,957
10	Go Ahead	2,880
11	Volendam	2,709
12	Fortuna	2,629
13	AGOVV	2,068
14	Excelsior	1,990
15	Omniworld	1,899
16	Haarlem	1,876
17	Eindhoven	1,709
18	Oss	1,579
19	Dordrecht	1,498
20	Telstar	1,397

== See also ==
- 2005–06 Eredivisie
- 2005–06 KNVB Cup
