= Veldmate =

Veldmate is a surname. Notable people with the surname include:

- Jeroen Veldmate (born 1988), Dutch footballer
- Mark Veldmate (born 1984), Dutch footballer
