= Sier (Ameland) =

Former village on Ameland

Map of Ameland from 1731 showing the location of the last two houses in Sier

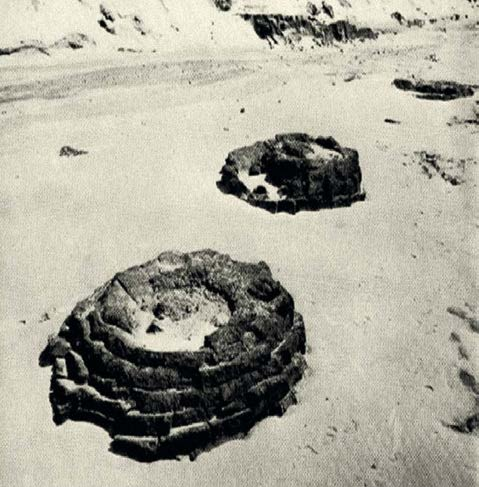
Remains of the medieval wells that surfaced after WW2

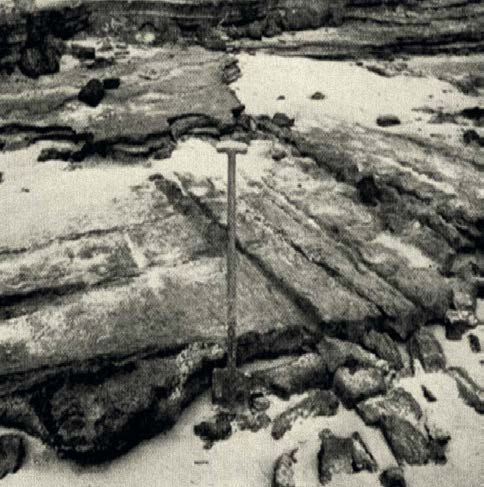
Remains of the medieval cart tracks that surfaced after WW2

Sier (Dutch pronunciation: [sir]) was a village on the Dutch island of Ameland, located to the west of Hollum. At its height in the 1500s, it reportedly had around 20 fishing boats. It was also said to have had a lighthouse. The village was slowly consumed by the advancing dunes, and later by the sea, and its last house burned down around 1730.

Another fishing village, called Oerd, existed on the east side of the same island. Similarly to Sier, it was abandoned because of dune migration and repeated floods.

== History ==
Geological evidence shows that Sier was founded around the year 1000, and the first archeological findings from the village date to the 12th or 13th century. The small fishing village was located on the west coast of Ameland at the mouth of the old Middelzee. At its peak around 1500, it was said to have possessed a fishing port with around 20 boats. According to tradition, villagers would attend church services wearing top hats.

Before the 1800s, dunes were not fixed in place with beach grass. Because of this, the dunes to the west of Sier slowly migrated towards the village from around 1500, burying it over time. Eventually, the village was abandoned. Sier was last mentioned in chronicles in the middle of the 16th century. According to some reports, the last house burned down for unknown reasons around 1730.

== Legacy ==
The existence of Sier was doubted by some in the early 19th century, despite eye witnesses having attested to its existence.

During the February flood of 1825, remains of houses surfaced at the location of the former village. Soon after the end of the Second World War, the remains of wells became visible, as well as cart tracks left in the peat surface. Due to coastal erosion, these remains were swallowed up by the sea. Their position is currently a kilometer from the coast, in the sea between Ameland and Terschelling. As late as 1984, remains of wells from the easternmost part of Sier were found.

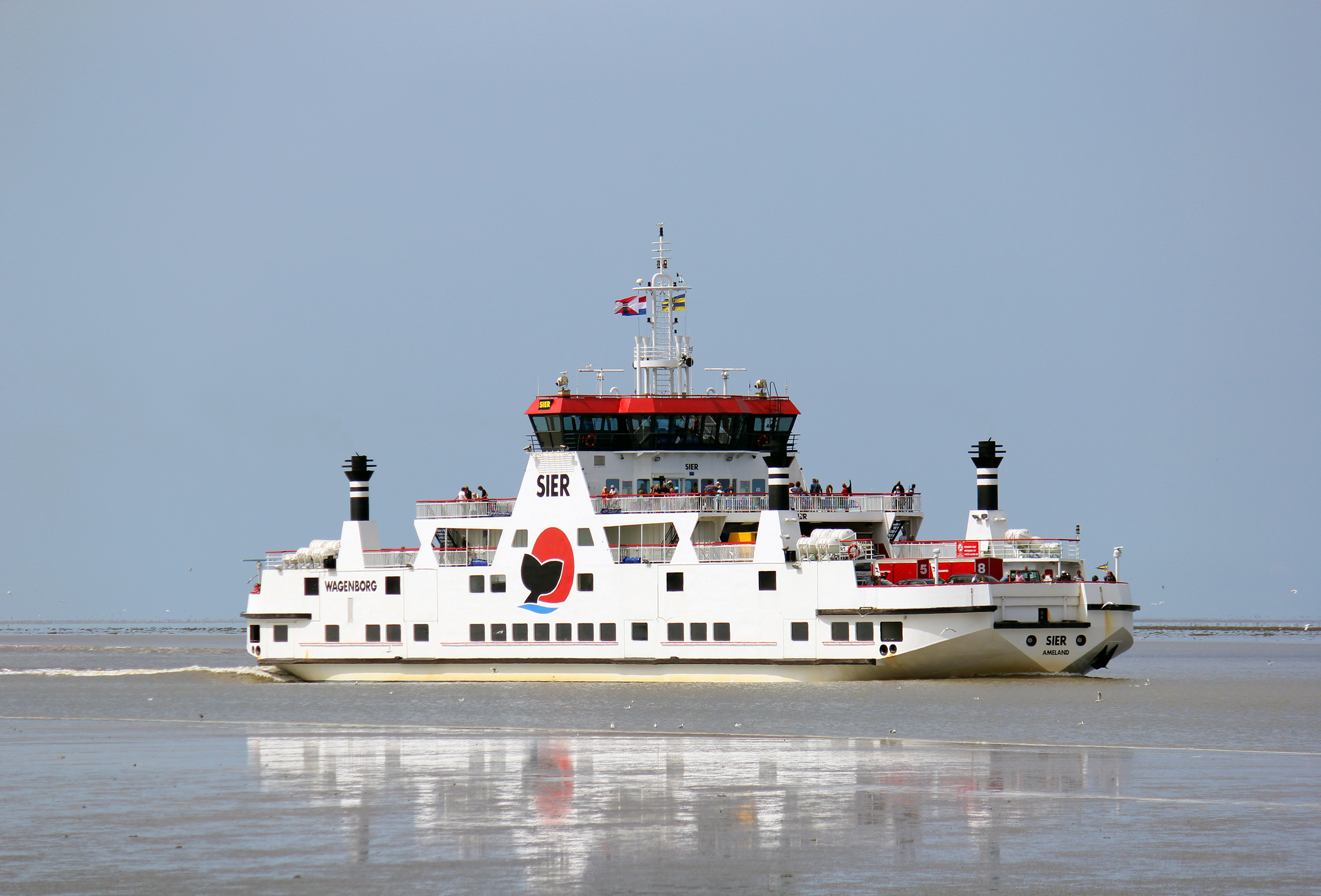
The ferry to Ameland, m.s. Sier, named after the village.

One of the ferries to Ameland, the m.s. Sier, is named after the former village.
