= Revy =

Revy refers to:

- Revy (or "Reve" en français) is a popular local nickname for Revelstoke, British Columbia, Canada
- Revy, the female protagonist in the Japanese manga and anime Black Lagoon
- Revy Home and Garden, a former Canadian home improvement retail chain, acquired by Rona in 2001
- Revy Rosalia (born 1982), Netherlands Antilles soccer player
- REVY, the Royal Edward Victualling Yard at Pyrmont, Sydney, NSW, Australia
