= Leferink =

Leferink is a surname. Notable people with the surname include:

- Elles Leferink (born 1976), Dutch volleyball player
- Niki Leferink (born 1976), Dutch former football striker
