= 2006–07 Eerste Divisie =

51st season of the second-tier football league in Netherlands

- Champions: De Graafschap
- Promoted: De Graafschap, VVV-Venlo

The 2006/2007 season of the Eerste Divisie began on August 11, 2006, and ended in May 2007.

== Promoted teams ==
The following teams were promoted to the Eredivisie at the end of the season:

- De Graafschap (champion)
- VVV-Venlo (playoffs)

== New team ==
This team was relegated out of the Eredivisie at the start of the season:

- RBC Roosendaal (18th position)

== League standings ==
Pos	Team	Pld	W	D	L	GF	GA	GD	Pts	Promotion or qualification
1	De Graafschap (C, P)	38	25	8	5	88	41	+47	83	Promotion to the Eredivisie
2	VVV-Venlo (P)	38	21	8	9	64	44	+20	71	Qualification for promotion play-offs Second Round
3	RBC Roosendaal	38	20	10	8	82	44	+38	70	Qualification for promotion play-offs Second Round
4	FC Volendam	38	19	11	8	65	40	+25	68	Qualification for promotion play-offs Second Round
5	FC Den Bosch	38	20	8	10	65	43	+22	68	Qualification for promotion play-offs Second Round
6	FC Dordrecht	38	20	7	11	76	49	+27	67	Qualification for promotion play-offs First Round
7	Go Ahead Eagles	38	16	9	13	56	51	+5	57	Qualification for promotion play-offs First Round
8	BV Veendam	38	14	13	11	57	50	+7	55	Qualification for promotion play-offs First Round
9	FC Zwolle	38	14	11	13	66	51	+15	53	Qualification for promotion play-offs First Round
10	Stormvogels Telstar	38	14	6	18	61	61	0	48	
11	FC Emmen	38	13	9	16	59	65	−6	48	
12	Cambuur Leeuwarden	38	13	8	17	44	57	−13	47	
13	MVV	38	11	13	14	49	51	−2	46	
14	HFC Haarlem	38	10	13	15	43	57	−14	43	
15	Fortuna Sittard	38	12	7	19	38	57	−19	43	
16	FC Omniworld	38	11	8	19	55	82	−27	41	
17	TOP Oss	38	11	7	20	59	78	−19	40	
18	Helmond Sport	38	8	12	18	40	76	−36	36	
19	FC Eindhoven	38	7	12	19	47	80	−33	33	
20	AGOVV Apeldoorn	38	7	8	23	42	79	−37	29	

(C) Champions; (P) Promoted

== Playoffs ==
Round 1

Team #1	Aggregate	Team #2	Match 1	Match 2
FC Zwolle	1-2	FC Dordrecht	0-1	1-1
BV Veendam	5-3	Go Ahead Eagles	5-1	0–2

Round 2 (best of 3)

Team #1	Aggregate	Team #2	Match 1	Match 2	Match 3
FC Dordrecht	2-5	RKC Waalwijk	2-0	0-2	0–3
FC Den Bosch	2-3	VVV-Venlo	1-2	1-0	0–1
FC Volendam	3-6	RBC Roosendaal	3-5	0-1	Not played
BV Veendam	0-4	Excelsior	0-1	0-3	Not played

Round 3 (best of 3)

Team #1	Aggregate	Team #2	Match 1	Match 2	Match 3
VVV-Venlo	5-1	RKC Waalwijk	2-0	0-1	3–0
RBC Roosendaal	1-2	Excelsior	1-1	0-1	Not played

VVV Venlo and Excelsior will play in the 2007–08 Eredivisie

== Match table ==
Home \ Away	AGO	CAM	DBO	DOR	EIN	EMM	FOR	GAE	GRA	HAA	HEL	MVV	OMN	RBC	STO	TOP	VEE	VOL	VVV	ZWO
AGOVV Apeldoorn		3–1	3–0	1–0	2–0	0–3	1–2	1–2	4–4	2–3	1–1	2–0	1–3	0–3	0–2	0–2	2–1	0–1	1–1	1–2
Cambuur Leeuwarden	1–1		1–2	4–2	0–0	0–2	2–1	3–1	1–1	1–0	0–0	1–1	4–1	2–1	1–4	2–1	0–0	0–1	2–1	0–4
FC Den Bosch	2–0	3–1		1–0	2–3	3–0	2–0	1–1	0–4	4–1	3–1	2–1	3–0	2–1	2–0	1–0	1–1	3–0	0–1	2–2
FC Dordrecht	4–1	2–1	0–4		2–1	2–0	1–3	1–2	1–3	4–0	2–0	1–0	3–0	0–4	4–2	4–1	1–1	1–0	2–0	1–0
FC Eindhoven	4–1	0–2	0–2	1–7		1–4	0–2	0–4	1–2	1–1	0–2	1–6	2–2	2–2	2–1	1–1	1–2	3–1	0–5	1–2
FC Emmen	3–2	0–1	3–0	1–1	3–2		0–2	1–1	0–3	1–1	2–1	0–0	2–1	2–2	0–1	1–1	4–0	2–2	1–2	3–3
Fortuna Sittard	2–1	2–1	0–0	0–4	2–1	0–4		0–2	0–2	2–0	0–1	0–0	1–2	2–2	2–1	2–1	0–2	1–3	0–2	0–0
Go Ahead Eagles	1–2	1–0	1–1	0–3	2–0	2–0	3–1		3–1	3–1	1–2	2–0	2–1	1–1	1–2	5–0	0–0	1–2	0–1	1–1
De Graafschap	3–1	3–1	3–1	2–0	1–1	2–1	4–1	0–1		3–1	3–1	3–3	6–1	0–1	1–0	2–0	1–1	4–2	4–2	2–0
HFC Haarlem	1–1	3–1	1–1	1–1	2–1	2–1	1–1	1–1	0–3		3–2	1–0	2–1	1–1	1–0	1–1	2–0	1–1	0–1	1–3
Helmond Sport	2–2	0–0	3–3	2–4	2–2	0–5	0–1	1–3	0–0	1–0		1–1	2–0	2–0	2–1	0–2	1–7	1–1	1–1	1–1
MVV	5–0	1–3	1–1	1–1	2–2	1–3	2–1	4–1	1–3	0–0	1–0		1–1	2–1	1–0	1–0	3–1	1–0	0–0	4–2
FC Omniworld	2–0	2–2	1–4	2–5	1–1	5–3	1–1	0–1	0–1	2–0	1–1	3–1		1–4	2–5	3–2	3–1	0–0	2–3	2–7
RBC Roosendaal	5–1	2–0	2–0	3–2	0–2	5–0	2–0	3–3	1–3	2–0	5–0	4–1	2–0		3–1	3–1	1–1	1–1	3–1	3–0
Stormvogels Telstar	3–2	0–1	3–1	0–0	2–3	1–2	0–3	2–2	0–0	1–1	2–1	1–0	2–0	2–4		4–0	1–1	5–3	3–1	2–1
TOP Oss	5–2	3–1	0–3	2–2	0–0	4–0	2–1	4–0	4–2	1–6	1–3	3–0	4–5	2–0	3–3		0–3	0–2	1–4	3–1
BV Veendam	4–0	0–1	0–2	2–1	2–2	1–1	1–1	2–0	1–3	2–2	3–0	2–1	0–2	1–1	2–1	2–0		0–4	2–1	3–1
FC Volendam	1–0	3–0	2–1	1–3	1–3	6–1	2–0	3–0	2–1	3–1	3–0	1–1	0–0	1–1	4–1	4–1	1–1		1–0	1–0
VVV-Venlo	0–0	3–2	2–1	1–3	1–1	1–0	3–1	2–1	1–2	1–0	6–2	0–0	3–1	3–1	2–1	2–1	2–1	0–0		2–2
FC Zwolle	0–0	2–0	0–1	1–1	4–1	3–0	1–0	3–0	2–2	2–0	5–0	3–1	0–1	1–2	2–1	2–2	1–3	1–1	1–2	

Legend: Blue = home team win; Yellow = draw; Red = away team win.

== Topscorers ==
Final standings

Pos.	Player	Club	Goals
1.	Berry Powel	De Graafschap	29
2.	Harrie Gommans	MVV	22
3.	Jhonny van Beukering	De Graafschap	21
3.	Cecilio Lopes	FC Dordrecht	20
5.	Dirk Jan Derksen	VVV-Venlo	19
6.	Sjoerd Ars	Go Ahead Eagles	18
6.	Jan Bruin	Stormvogels Telstar	18
8.	Ruud ter Heide	AGOVV	16
9.	Danny Guyt	RBC Roosendaal	15
9.	Marnix Kolder	BV Veendam	15
9.	Ahmed Ahahaoui	Haarlem	15

== Attendances ==
Rank	Club	Average	% Change	Highest
1	De Graafschap	8,744	15.8%	11,500
2	MVV Maastricht	5,236	8.8%	7,823
3	Go Ahead Eagles	4,569	58.6%	6,890
4	VVV-Venlo	4,284	-10.5%	5,810
5	FC Den Bosch	4,004	15.7%	4,870
6	RBC Roosendaal	3,624	-16.6%	5,000
7	FC Emmen	3,430	-8.8%	5,211
8	SC Cambuur	3,413	-5.2%	4,312
9	Fortuna Sittard	3,400	29.3%	6,953
10	PEC Zwolle	3,217	-1.6%	6,500
11	SC Veendam	2,964	-1.0%	3,810
12	Helmond Sport	2,917	-1.4%	3,860
13	FC Volendam	2,662	-1.7%	3,478
14	FC Dordrecht	2,355	57.2%	3,617
15	AGOVV	1,991	-3.7%	2,375
16	TOP Oss	1,953	23.7%	2,654
17	HFC Haarlem	1,850	-1.4%	2,250
18	FC Omniworld	1,754	-7.6%	2,750
19	FC Eindhoven	1,705	-0.2%	3,221
20	SC Telstar	1,589	13.7%	2,969

== See also ==
- 2006–07 Eredivisie
- 2006–07 KNVB Cup
