= De Verwachting, Hollum =

Windmill in Hollum, Netherlands

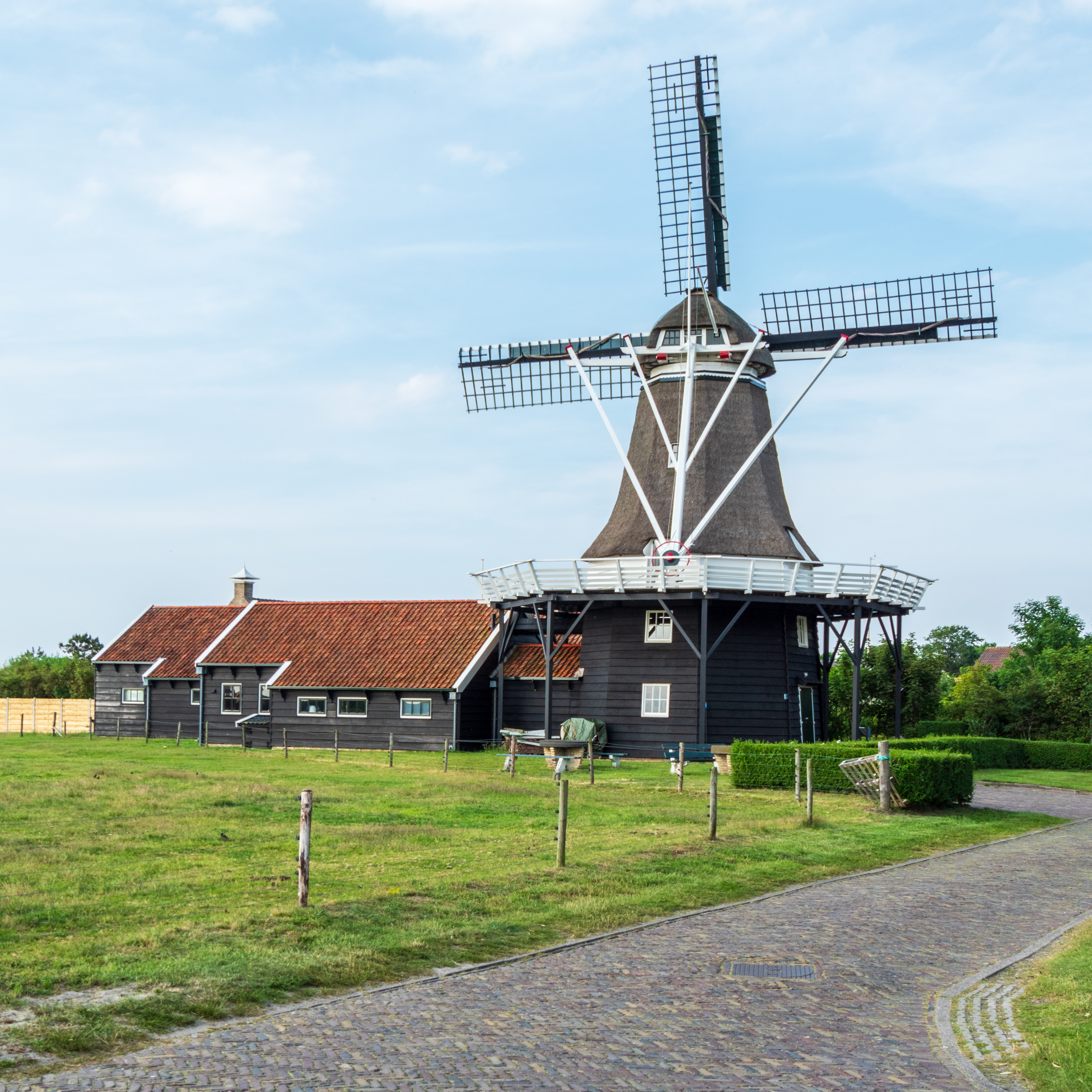
- De Verwachting

Origin
- Mill name: De Verwachting
- Mill location: Molenweg 8, 9161 AW, Hollum
- Coordinates: 53°26′24″N 5°38′00″E
- Operator(s): Gemeente Ameland
- Year built: 1991

Information
- Purpose: Corn mill and mustard mill
- Type: Smock mill
- Storeys: Two-storey smock
- Base storeys: Three-storey base
- Smock sides: Eight sides
- No. of sails: Four sails
- Type of sails: Common sails
- Windshaft: Cast iron
- Winding: Tailpole and winch
- No. of pairs of millstones: One pair
- Size of millstones: 1.30 metres (4 ft 3 in) diameter

De Verwachting (English: The Expectation) is a smock mill in Hollum, Friesland, Netherlands which was built in 1991 and is in working order.

== History ==
A mill previously stood on this site. It was built in 1840 by millwright Van der Meer of Harlingen for Hendrik Willems de Boer. A few years before the Second World War, a diesel engine was installed, but the mill was worked by wind during the war as no diesel fuel was available to run the engine. The mill was demolished in 1949. In 1991, a windmill was moved from Brucht, Overijssel. It was built on the site of the original mill by millwrights Fabrikaat Hiemstra of Tzummarum at a cost of ƒ679,920. The mill was officially opened on 16 November 1994.

== Description ==
De Verwachting is what the Dutch describe as a "stellingmolen" . It is a two-storey smock mill on a three-storey base. The stage is at second-floor level, 5.06 metres (16 ft 7 in) above ground level. The smock and cap are thatched. The mill is winded by tailpole and winch. The sails are Common sails. The sails on the inner stock have a span of 18.50 metres (60 ft 8 in) while the sails on the outer stock have a span of 18.60 metres (61 ft 0 in). The sails are carried on a cast-iron windshaft, which was cast by Fabrikaat Buurma, Oudeschans, Groningen in 1991. The windshaft also carries the clasp arm brake wheel, which has 55 cogs. This drives the wallower (27 cogs) at the top of the upright shaft. At the bottom of the upright shaft, the great spur wheel, which has 77 cogs, it drives the 1.30 metres (4 ft 3 in) diameter Cullen millstones via a lantern pinion stone nut which has 26 staves.

== Public access ==
De Verwachting is regularly open to the public, although it is not open on Sundays, Mondays or public holidays.
