= Berry Powel =

Dutch footballer (born 1980)

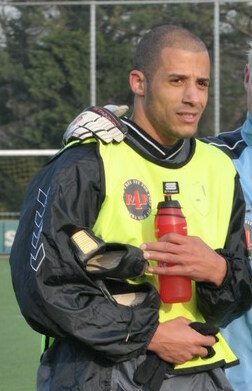
- Powel in 2008

Personal information
- Full name: Berry Leroy Powel
- Date of birth: 2 May 1980 (age 46)
- Place of birth: Utrecht, Netherlands
- Height: 1.85 m (6 ft 1 in)
- Position: Forward

Team information
- Current team: De Graafschap (technical director)

Youth career
- 1994–1997: Quick 1890
- 1997–1998: Roda '46

Senior career*
Years	Team	Apps	(Gls)
1998–2003	Roda '46		
2003–2005	Den Bosch	79	(30)
2005–2006	Millwall	12	(1)
2006–2008	De Graafschap	58	(35)
2008–2009	Groningen	27	(5)
2009–2010	ADO Den Haag	19	(1)
2009–2010	→ De Graafschap (loan)	29	(15)
2010–2012	Gimnàstic	60	(20)
2012	Huracán Valencia	2	(0)
2012–2013	Elche	22	(3)
2014	Heracles Almelo	4	(0)
2014	Roda JC Kerkrade	7	(1)
2014–2017	Kozakken Boys	53	(33)
2017	→ IJsselmeervogels (loan)	14	(19)
2017–2018	IJsselmeervogels	26	(7)
2018–2019	DVS '33	28	(6)
2019–2021	GVVV	25	(12)
2021–2022	Roda '46		
Total		465+	(188+)
- * Club domestic league appearances and goals

Berry Leroy Powel (born 2 May 1980) is a Dutch former professional footballer who played as a forward. He is the current technical director of Eerste Divisie club De Graafschap.

== Career ==
Powel began his footballing career at amateur club Quick 1890 before joining Roda '46, where his performances attracted the attention of professional scouts. In 2003, he signed with FC Den Bosch, making his debut for the first team in the same year. During his inaugural season, he scored nine goals in 26 appearances in the Eerste Divisie, contributing to the club's promotion to the Eredivisie as league champions. The following season, Powel scored twice in 29 matches in the top flight, as Den Bosch were relegated after just one year. The subsequent departures of several key players, including Koen van de Laak, Mourad Mghizrat, Jochen Janssen and Dennis Schulp, elevated Powel to a central role within the team.

In the 2005–06 season, Powel scored 19 goals in 26 matches, prompting a move to English side Millwall. He made an immediate impact, scoring two minutes into his debut to secure a 1–1 draw against Cardiff City. Following Millwall’s relegation to Football League One, Powel returned to the Netherlands, signing a three-year contract with De Graafschap. He enjoyed a prolific 2006–07 campaign, finishing as the Eerste Divisie's top scorer with 29 goals and playing a key role in the club's promotion.

On 25 August 2010, Powel joined Spanish Segunda División side Gimnàstic on a free transfer. He scored twice on his debut in a 2–0 victory over Girona FC. Although his initial form was promising, he failed to score in the next four matches. A tactical adjustment saw him deployed in a more mobile attacking role, after which he scored in a 2–2 draw against FC Cartagena, having come off the bench with the team trailing. His fourth goal came six games later, a penalty against AD Alcorcón. Despite inconsistent scoring, Powel remained the team's leading goal-scorer. Under new manager Juan Carlos Oliva, Gimnàstic experienced an upturn in form, avoiding relegation, and Powel scored in four consecutive matches against UD Salamanca, Rayo Vallecano, Celta Vigo and Xerez. His performances earned him popularity among supporters and local media, who dubbed him "The Killer of Utrecht". In early 2012, Powel's contract with Gimnàstic was terminated after he was seen in a nightclub shortly after undergoing surgery for a muscular injury, an incident which led to disciplinary action from the club.

On 5 June 2012, Powel returned to Spain, signing a two-year contract with Elche CF. He departed the club on a free transfer in August 2013, following their promotion to La Liga.

After a brief trial with his former club De Graafschap, he signed an amateur contract with Heracles Almelo in January 2014. Having made four appearances, Powel left the club six weeks later to join Roda JC Kerkrade on a professional deal until the end of the season.

== Later career ==
On 26 April 2019, it was announced that Powel would assume a scouting role at De Graafschap, commencing on 1 July of that year. In August 2019, he also signed as a player with GVVV in the Tweede Divisie.

In November 2024, Powel was appointed technical director of De Graafschap on an interim basis, following the departure of Peter Bijvelds. During this transitional period, he collaborated with head scout Richard Roelofsen to oversee player recruitment. On 3 February 2025, Powel signed a contract extending his tenure as technical manager until October 2027. Club director Marco Boogers endorsed the appointment, citing Powel's enrolment in the KNVB's technical director development programme and his collaboration with senior advisors at the club.

== Honours ==
Den Bosch

- Eerste Divisie: 2003–04

De Graafschap

- Eerste Divisie: 2006–07, 2009–10

Elche

- Segunda División: 2012–13

Kozakken Boys

- Topklasse Saturday: 2014–15

Individual

- Eerste Divisie top goalscorer: 2005–06 (shared), 2006–07
