= Danny Guijt =

Dutch footballer

Personal information
- Full name: Danny Guijt
- Date of birth: 7 February 1981 (age 45)
- Place of birth: Leiden, Netherlands
- Height: 1.86 m (6 ft 1 in)
- Position: Midfielder

Youth career
- Katwijk

Senior career*
Years	Team	Apps	(Gls)
2000–2004	TOP Oss	126	(26)
2004–2008	RBC	102	(21)
2008–2011	Cambuur	98	(11)
2011–2013	Willem II	48	(8)
2013–2016	Katwijk	25	(6)
Total		399	(72)
- * Club domestic league appearances and goals

Danny Guijt (born 7 February 1981) is a Dutch retired footballer who played as a midfielder.

== Club career ==
Born in Leiden but raised in Katwijk, Guijt made his debut in professional football in the 2000–01 Eerste Divisie season for TOP Oss. After four seasons, playing as a regular for TOP, he decides to play for RBC Roosendaal who play in the Eredivisie. His second season for RBC proves to be a failure, with Guijt only playing three matches because of an injury. RBC were also relegated, meaning that Guijt would play in the second division again. Following a series of good performances from Guijt in the 2006–07 season, various Eredivisie clubs showed their interest in him.

In 2008, he chose to sign with SC Cambuur, another club from the Dutch second division. He signed a contract, keeping him in Leeuwarden until mid-2011. He signed a two-year contract with Willem II in June 2011, who signed him from Cambuur on a free transfer. Between 2013 and 2016, he played for the first team of VV Katwijk before retiring from football.

Guijt has worked as a paint wholesaler.
