= Jan Bruin =

Dutch footballer

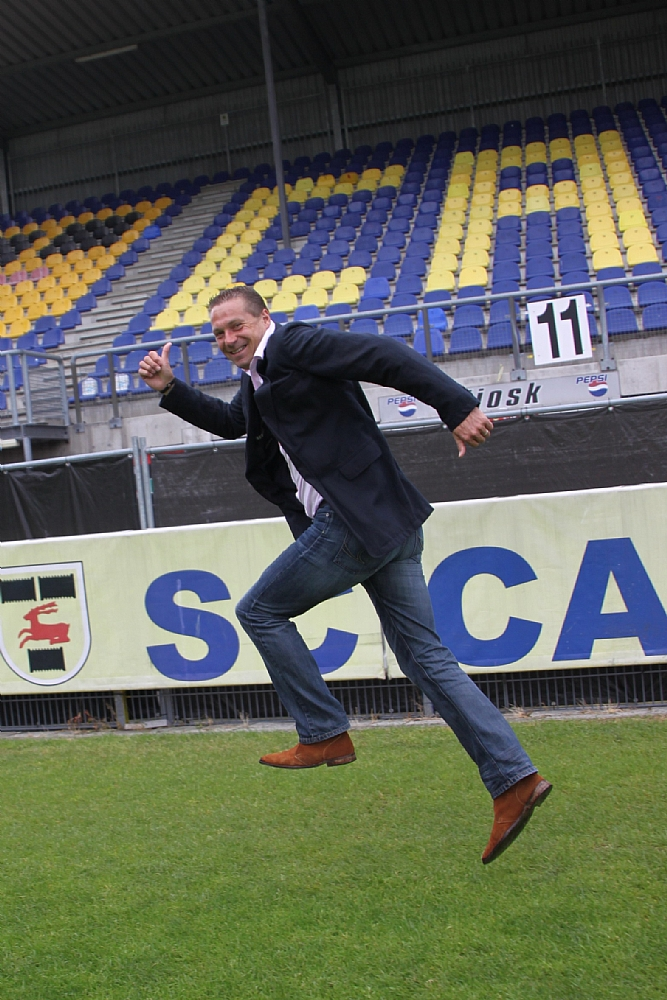

Personal information
- Date of birth: 30 September 1969 (age 57)
- Place of birth: Hollum, Netherlands
- Position: Striker

Youth career
- Amelandia

Senior career*
Years	Team	Apps	(Gls)
1991–1995	Cambuur	74	(12)
1995–1998	FC Zwolle	89	(38)
1998–2000	Volendam	34	(16)
2000–2005	Cambuur	133	(61)
2005–2008	Stormvogels Telstar	104	(37)
Total		434	(164)

Managerial career
- 2017–2018: Cambuur (caretaker)
- * Club domestic league appearances and goals as of 22:33, 23 December 2008 (UTC)

Jan Bruin (born 30 September 1969 in Hollum, Ameland) is a Dutch retired footballer.

== Club career ==
He has played the majority of his career in the Eerste Divisie for SC Cambuur, FC Volendam and FC Zwolle before finishing his career at Stormvogels Telstar. He played as a striker. After ending his professional career, Bruin returned to boyhood club Amelandia with former teammate René van Rijswijk to encourage kids to join the club on the island.

Bruin is Cambuur's record goalscorer of all-time and currently works as an assistant coach at the club.
