= Charles Dissels =

Dutch footballer (born 1984)

Personal information
- Full name: Charles Leonard Edwino Dissels
- Date of birth: 21 December 1984 (age 41)
- Place of birth: Amsterdam, Netherlands
- Height: 1.81 m (5 ft 11 in)
- Position: Winger

Youth career
- FC Amstelland
- Abcoude
- Volendam

Senior career*
Years	Team	Apps	(Gls)
2003–2007	Volendam	77	(17)
2007–2010	Sparta	62	(12)
2010–2011	Volendam	30	(2)
2011–2012	Cambuur	31	(6)
2012–2015	Almere City	73	(20)
2015–2016	Magreb '90		
- * Club domestic league appearances and goals as of 11 May 2015 (UTC)

Charles Dissels (born 21 December 1984) is a Dutch footballer who plays as a winger. He formerly played for FC Volendam, Sparta Rotterdam, SC Cambuur and Almere City.

== Club career ==
Dissels, the son of a Surinamese father and a Moluccan mother, was schooled in the youth departments of FC Amstelland, Abcoude and FC Volendam and made his debut for Volendam's main squad on 6 December 2003 in their 7–0 away defeat to PSV. He became the club's top scorer for the 2006–07 season, with 12 goals. He moved to Sparta Rotterdam for the 2007–08 season. After the relegation of Sparta at the end of the 2009–10 season he returned to FC Volendam on a free transfer. After a season at SC Cambuur, Dissels joined Almere City in 2012. He later had a spell with the amateur side Magreb '90, but he left the club after being left in turmoil due to their chairman being jailed in Turkey.
