= Oerd =

Former village on Ameland

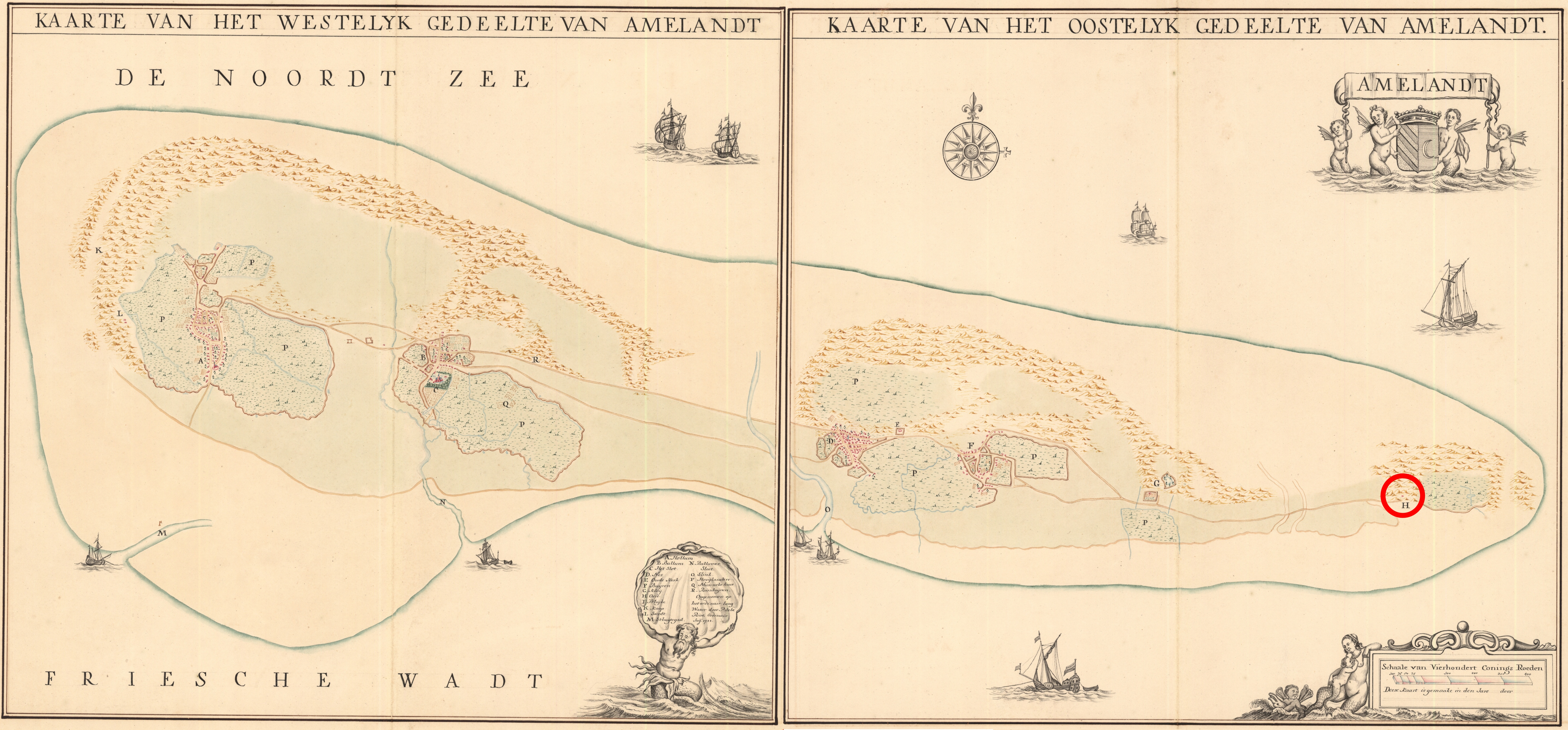
Map of Ameland from 1731 showing the location of the last house in Oerd.

Oerd (also known as Oosthuizen) was a village on Ameland. It was situated in the modern-day nature preserve of the same name. Oerd was primarily a fishing village. It was destroyed over the centuries due to repeated flooding and sand drifts, and was finally abandoned in the first half of the 18th century. Most of the remaining residents moved to Buren.

After the February flood of 1825, remains of houses and coinage from the 17th century were found on the beach. Remains of the village were also found during excavations in 1979.

An elderberry bush, called "Risjemoei" was said by locals to be the last reminder of the village. According to the legend, this bush would cause ships to get shipwrecked during storms. One of the ferries to Ameland is named after the former village.

Another fishing village, called Sier, existed on the west-side of the same island. Similar to Oerd, it was abandoned because of dune migration.
