= Jhon van Beukering =

Footballer (born 1983)

Personal information
- Full name: Jhonny Rudolf van Beukering
- Date of birth: 29 September 1983 (age 43)
- Place of birth: Velp, Netherlands
- Height: 1.72 m (5 ft 8 in)
- Position: Striker

Youth career
- Velpse Boys
- VVO
- De Graafschap
- Vitesse

Senior career*
| Years | Team | Apps | (Gls) |
| 2000–2004 | Vitesse | 49 | (8) |
| 2002–2003 | → Zwolle (loan) | 6 | (2) |
| 2003–2004 | → De Graafschap (loan) | 11 | (9) |
| 2004–2007 | De Graafschap | 81 | (40) |
| 2007–2010 | NEC | 47 | (15) |
| 2009–2010 | → De Graafschap (loan) | 9 | (2) |
| 2010 | Go Ahead Eagles | 4 | (1) |
| 2010–2011 | Feyenoord | 3 | (0) |
| 2011–2012 | Pelita Jaya | 2 | (0) |
| 2012 | Dordrecht | 0 | (0) |
| 2013 | Presikhaaf | 3 | (3) |
| 2013 | MASV | 0 | (0) |
| Total | | 215 | (80) |

International career
| 1998 | Netherlands U15 | 1 | (0) |
| 1998–1999 | Netherlands U16 | 6 | (2) |
| 1999–2000 | Netherlands U17 | 10 | (7) |
| 2000–2002 | Netherlands U19 | 20 | (8) |
| 2012 | Indonesia | 3 | (0) |
- * Club domestic league appearances and goals

Jhonny Rudolf van Beukering (born 29 September 1983) is a former professional footballer who played as a striker. Born in the Netherlands, he represented the Indonesia national team.

== Club career ==
=== Vitesse ===
Born in the Netherlands, van Beukering started playing for local amateur sides, before Vitesse Arnhem saw his talent, and signed him to Vitesse's youth academy after some strong displays in the youth team of De Graafschap. In the 2000–01 season he made his debut for Vitesse's main squad. Van Beukering scored two goals in the three games he played that season. The next season, he got a place in the starting lineup for the club and scored three goals.

In the 2002–03 season he only made six appearances, and as a result he was loaned out to FC Zwolle. In Zwolle he also played six games, scoring two goals. The next season, his loan spell at FC Zwolle was extended, and Van Beukering made three goals in 14 games.

=== De Graafschap ===
Van Beukering returned to his former club De Graafschap in the winter break. With nine goals in 11 games he played an important part in De Graafschap's promotion to the Eredivisie at the end of the 2003–04 season. In the Eredivisie he played 31 games for De Graafschap, scoring 9 goals. At the end of the season he sustained a heavy knee injury and he couldn't play for more than half a year.

De Graafschap, meanwhile relegated, could use Van Beukering again after the first half season in the Eerste Divisie. Van Beukering began scoring goals soon after returning from his injury.

=== NEC ===
He was snapped up by NEC in summer 2007 after he chose the club over RKC Waalwijk in January 2007 with NEC manager Mario Been praising his prolific goalscoring.

In summer 2009 van Beukering was loaned to former club De Graafschap.

=== Feyenoord ===
In December 2010 he signed a contract with Dutch team Feyenoord. He became infamous for his lack of speed, with Feyenoord manager Mario Been jokingly blaming a headwind after van Beukering showed a very slow sprint in his first game. At NEC he had already earned the nickname Jhonny of the Burger King due to him being frequently overweight.

=== Pelita Jaya ===
After an unsuccessful stint with Feyenoord, he left the club for Indonesian club Pelita Jaya.

In 2013 he played for the amateur team MASV in Arnhem, for which was also the assistant manager. In October 2016, his brother Dennis stated that van Beukering was in training to become a professional player once more.

== International career ==
Van Beukering played several times for the Netherlands youth teams. During his time playing in Indonesia he was invited to become an Indonesia citizen. He was called up to play against Uruguay but unable to play due to Indonesian regulations which does not allow dual nationalities. He was sworn in as a naturalized Indonesian citizen on 10 October 2011, making him eligible to play for the Indonesia national team.

On 14 November 2012, Beukering made his first unofficial debut with the Indonesia national team was when they challenged Timor-Leste, where he assisted Bambang Pamungkas for the only goal in the game. Beukering also played in the friendly against Cameroon in a 0–0 draw. He made his official international debut on 1 December 2012, in 2012 AFF Suzuki Cup against Malaysia.

== Career statistics ==
Appearances and goals by club, season and competition
| Club | Season | Division | League | | Total | |
| Club | Season | Division | Apps | Goals | Apps | Goals |
|---|---|---|---|---|---|---|
| Vitesse | 2000–01 | Eredivisie | 3 | 2 | 3 | 2 |
| Vitesse | 2001–02 | Eredivisie | 26 | 3 | 26 | 3 |
| Vitesse | 2002–03 | Eredivisie | 6 | 0 | 6 | 0 |
| Vitesse | 2003–04 | Eredivisie | 14 | 3 | 14 | 3 |
| Vitesse | Total | | 49 | 8 | 49 | 8 |
| Zwolle (loan) | 2002–03 | Eredivisie | 6 | 2 | 6 | 2 |
| De Graafschap (loan) | 2003–04 | Eerste Divisie | 11 | 9 | 11 | 9 |
| De Graafschap | 2004–05 | Eredivisie | 31 | 9 | 31 | 9 |
| De Graafschap | 2005–06 | Eerste Divisie | 13 | 10 | 13 | 10 |
| De Graafschap | 2006–07 | Eerste Divisie | 37 | 21 | 37 | 21 |
| De Graafschap | Total | | 81 | 40 | 81 | 40 |
| N.E.C. | 2007–08 | Eredivisie | 28 | 11 | 28 | 11 |
| N.E.C. | 2008–09 | Eredivisie | 19 | 4 | 19 | 4 |
| N.E.C. | Total | | 47 | 15 | 47 | 15 |
| De Graafschap (loan) | 2009–10 | Eerste Divisie | 9 | 2 | 9 | 2 |
| Go Ahead Eagles | 2010–11 | Eerste Divisie | 4 | 1 | 4 | 1 |
| Feyenoord | 2010–11 | Eredivisie | 3 | 0 | 3 | 0 |
| Pelita Bandung Raya | 2011–12 | Indonesia Super League | 2 | 0 | 2 | 0 |
| FC Presikhaaf | 2012–13 | Vierde Klasse & Eerste Klasse | 3 | 3 | 3 | 3 |
| Career total | | | 215 | 80 | 215 | 80 |

== Honours ==
De Graafschap

- Eerste Divisie: 2006–07, 2009–10

== See also ==
- List of Indonesia international footballers born outside Indonesia
