= Bornrif =

Lighthouse in the Netherlands

Bornrif Lighthouse Amelân
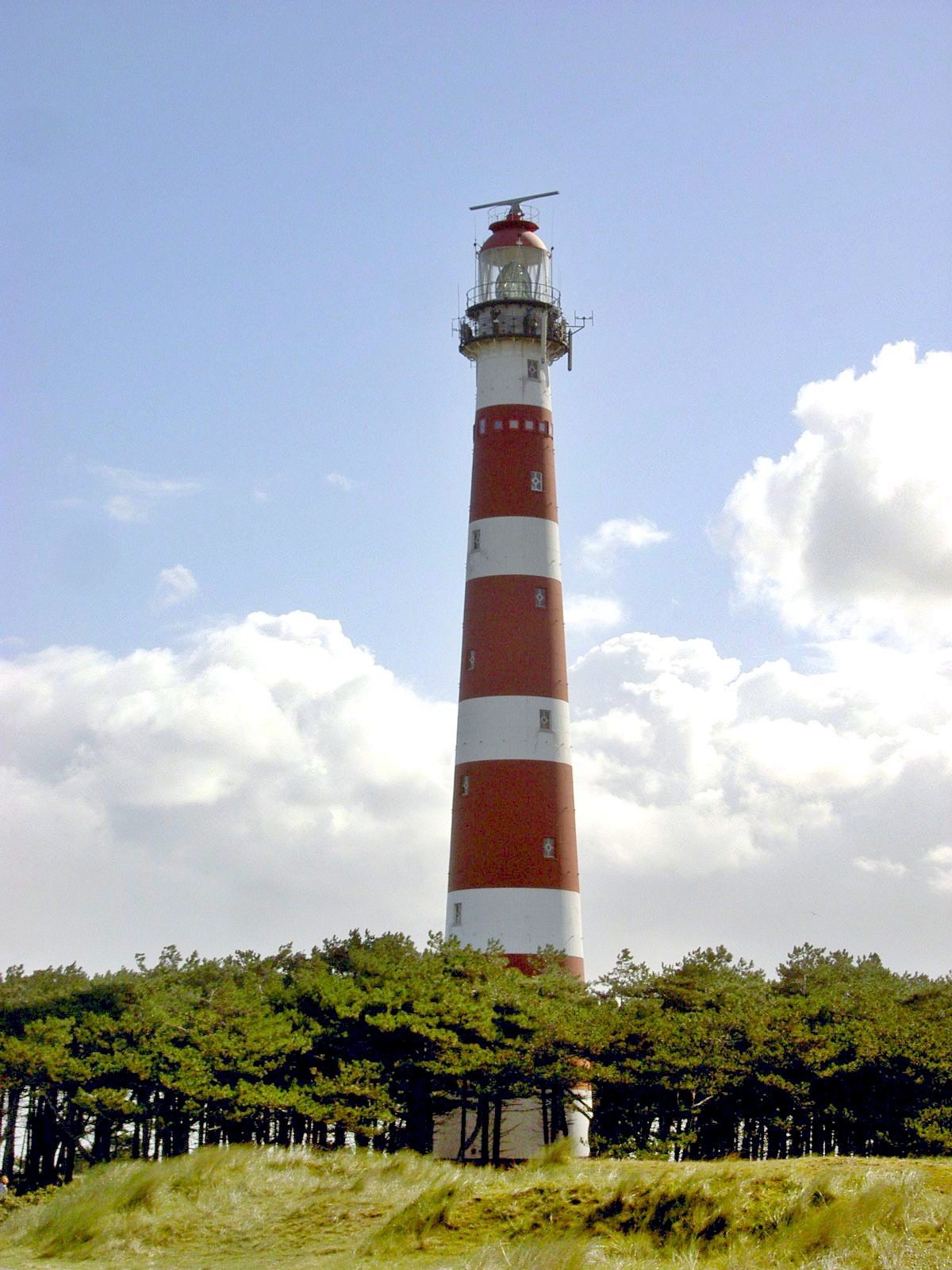
- Bornrif, Ameland Lighthouse
- Location: Hollum; Ameland; Netherlands
- Coordinates: 53°26′57.2″N 5°37′32.5″E

Tower
- Constructed: 1881
- Construction: cast iron
- Height: 55.3 metres (181 ft)
- Shape: cylindrical tower with balcony and lantern
- Markings: white and red bands tower, red lantern
- Heritage: Rijksmonument

Light
- Focal height: 58 metres (190 ft)
- Lens: 2nd order Fresnel lens
- Intensity: 4,400,000 cd
- Range: 30 nautical miles (56 km)
- Characteristic: Fl (3) W 15s.
- Netherlands no.: NL-2162

The Ameland Lighthouse, commonly known as Bornrif, is a lighthouse on the Dutch island Ameland, one of the Frisian Islands, on the edge of the North Sea. It was built in 1880 by order of William III of the Netherlands. It was designed by Dutch lighthouse architect Quirinus Harder and built by the foundry Nering Bögel in Deventer. The individual segments were shipped to Ameland and welded together on-site.

After World War II a new, weaker lamp was installed, which was replaced by a stronger lamp in 1952. The lighthouse is a Rijksmonument since 1982. Since the end of 2004 it is owned by Ameland, and it was opened for tourists in 2005. The tower has a space for exhibitions.

The lighthouse is 55 metres (180 ft) tall and has 15 floors, with a staircase with 236 steps. The optical installation came from the former Westhoofd Lighthouse in Ouddorp.

== Opening hours ==
- Summer: Sunday and Monday 1PM - 5PM and Tuesday - Saturday 10AM - 5PM. Wednesday - Saturday also open 7PM - 10PM.
- Winter: Wednesdays and weekends, 11AM - 4PM, Saturday 10PM - 11PM

== See also ==
- List of lighthouses in the Netherlands
