= Hilmi Mihçi =

Dutch footballer

Personal information
- Date of birth: 8 July 1976 (age 50)
- Place of birth: Baarn, Netherlands
- Height: 1.84 m (6 ft 0 in)
- Position: Forward

Senior career*
Years	Team	Apps	(Gls)
2000–2001	FC Den Bosch	26	(7)
2001–2002	FC Eindhoven	15	(12)
2002–2003	MSV Duisburg	5	(0)
2003–2004	De Graafschap	29	(9)
2004–2005	Stormvogels Telstar	15	(4)
2005	FC Omniworld	13	(9)
2006	FC Den Bosch	12	(6)
2006	Enosis Neon Paralimni	7	(2)
2007	Sivasspor	1	(0)
2007–2008	Helmond Sport	16	(1)
2008–2009	Young Boys Haarlem		
2009–2010	IJsselmeervogels		
- * Club domestic league appearances and goals

Hilmi Mihçi (born 8 July 1976) is a Dutch former professional footballer who played as a forward.

== Career ==
A journeyman striker, Mihci began his career at FC Den Bosch. He later played for Dutch top amateur side IJsselmeervogels, with whom he won the Dutch Amateur League title in June 2010.
