= Benjamin Martha =

Curaçaon footballer (born 1981)

Ben Martha
Personal information
- Full name: Benjamin Shurendy Martha
- Date of birth: 28 November 1981 (age 44)
- Place of birth: Willemstad, Curaçao, Netherlands Antilles
- Position: Winger

Team information
- Current team: BZC/Zuiderpark

Youth career
- 1989–2002: NAC Breda
- 2002–2005: Rijsoord

Senior career*
Years	Team	Apps	(Gls)
2005–2006	DOTO	18	(3)
2006–2008	RBC Roosendaal	71	(20)
2008–2009	Quick Boys	47	(16)
2009–2010	RVVH		
2011	Hubentut Fortuna		
2011–2012	Katwijk	24	(10)
2012–2013	SC Feyenoord		
2013–2014	Kozakken Boys	22	(5)
2014–2017	RVVH	14	(4)
2017–2021	BZC/Zuiderpark		
2021–2023	SV DRL Rotterdam		
2023–	BZC/Zuiderpark		

International career
2008	Netherlands Antilles	6	(1)
2013	Curaçao	2	(0)
- * Club domestic league appearances and goals as of 15 November 2024

Benjamin Shurendy Martha (born 28 November 1981) is a professional footballer who plays as a winger for BZC/Zuiderpark. At international level, he has played for the Netherlands Antilles and Curaçao national teams.

== Club career ==
Martha was born in Willemstad, Curaçao, in the former Netherlands Antilles. He began his football career 1989 in the youth team of NAC Breda and signed in summer 2002 for vv Rijsoord in Ridderkerk. He played for PVV DOTO in amateur level and signed a two-year contract with RBC Roosendaal in summer 2006. After two years who earned 71 gamed scored 20 goals left the club 2008 to sign for Quick Boys. On 24 March 2010, he left Quick Boys to sign for League rival RVVH.

== International career ==
Martha played for the Netherlands Antilles national team earning his first cap on 6 February 2008 against Nicaragua.

== Personal life ==
He is the brother from Eugene Martha, who played also with him on national team side.
