= Jeffrey Rijsdijk =

Dutch footballer

Personal information
- Date of birth: 12 September 1987 (age 39)
- Place of birth: Rotterdam, Netherlands
- Height: 1.78 m (5 ft 10 in)
- Position: Attacking midfielder

Youth career
- VV Alexandria '66
- Sparta Rotterdam

Senior career*
Years	Team	Apps	(Gls)
2008–2009	Sparta Rotterdam	1	(0)
2009–2011	Groningen	1	(0)
2011–2013	Dordrecht	66	(18)
2013–2016	Go Ahead Eagles	77	(5)
2016–2018	Almere City	42	(3)
2018–2021	Kozakken Boys	47	(7)
2021–2023	Capelle	24	(3)
2023–2025	XerxesDZB		
- * Club domestic league appearances and goals as of 15 January 2026

Jeffrey Rijsdijk (born 12 September 1987) is a Dutch professional footballer who plays as a midfielder. He has Indonesian descent.
