= Manu Dagher =

Liberian footballer

Personal information
- Full name: Manu Dagher
- Date of birth: 12 October 1984 (age 42)
- Place of birth: Foya Kamara, Liberia
- Height: 1.69 m (5 ft 7 in)
- Position: Striker

Youth career
- Baronie
- Heerenveen

Senior career*
Years	Team	Apps	(Gls)
2005–2008	Dordrecht	88	(8)
2009–2011	Kozakken Boys		
2011–2013	Waltham Forest	71	(22)
- * Club domestic league appearances and goals as of 02:15, 22 April 2012 (UTC)

Manu Dagher (born 12 October 1984) is a Liberian retired footballer who played as a striker. He is signed to Waltham Forest in England and was also a member of the Liberia national football team.

== Club career ==
Dagher played for the Baronie and Heerenveen youth teams. He left Baronie for Eerste Divisie side FC Dordrecht in 2005 but was released by them after the 2007/08 season and in September 2009 he signed a contract with Dutch non-league side Kozakken Boys from Werkendam. Dagher stated he still wanted to succeed in football. He scored on his debut in a 3–5 away win at Zwaluwen '30.

In August 2011 he signed for Waltham Forest.

== Personal life ==
He left his native Liberia by himself in 2002, ending up in a Dutch camp for pro club seekers near Breda. In Holland he later met his future wife Maima and they later had two children called Cheyenne and Nadim Dagher.
