= Hubert Dijk =

Dutch retired professional footballer

Personal information
- Date of birth: 8 August 1978 (age 48)
- Place of birth: Amersfoort, Netherlands
- Position: Striker

Youth career
- WSV Apeldoorn

Senior career*
| Years | Team | Apps | (Gls) |
| 1998–2003 | Go Ahead Eagles | 86 | (16) |
| 2003–2004 | TOP Oss | 33 | (4) |
| 2004–2007 | Excelsior '31 | | |
| Total | | 119+ | (20+) |
- * Club domestic league appearances and goals

Hubert Dijk (born 8 August 1978) is a Dutch retired professional footballer who played as a striker.

== Club career ==
Born in Amersfoort, Dijk made over 100 appearances in the Dutch league for Go Ahead Eagles and TOP Oss. He joined amateur side Excelsior '31 in summer 2004, and left them in 2007.
