= Florencio Cornelia =

Dutch footballer

Personal information
- Date of birth: 14 June 1981 (age 45)
- Place of birth: Leiderdorp, Netherlands
- Position: Striker

Youth career
- UVS

Senior career*
| Years | Team | Apps | (Gls) |
| 2000–2002 | Go Ahead Eagles | 6 | (1) |
| 2002–2003 | Noordwijk | | |
| 2003–2004 | Ter Leede | | |
| 2004–2005 | Stormvogels Telstar | 23 | (4) |
| 2005–2006 | Ter Leede | | |
| 2007–2008 | Fortuna Sittard | 29 | (14) |
| 2008–2009 | Rijnvogels | | |
| 2009–2011 | Genemuiden | | |
| 2011–2012 | Young Boys | | |
- * Club domestic league appearances and goals as of 13 March 2017

Florencio Cornelia (born 14 June 1981 in Leiderdorp) is a Dutch retired footballer who played professionally for Eerste Divisie clubs Go Ahead Eagles, Stormvogels Telstar and Fortuna Sittard during the 2000-2008 football seasons.

== Club career ==
Cornelia constantly switched between professional and amateur football, playing for the likes of Noordwijk, Ter Leede and Rijnvogels in between spells in the Eerste Divisie.

In 2011 he left Topklasse outfit Genemuiden after 2 1/2 years at the club and joined Young Boys. He later returned to Noordwijk and then Ter Leede.
