= Jürgen Müller =

Jürgen L. Müller
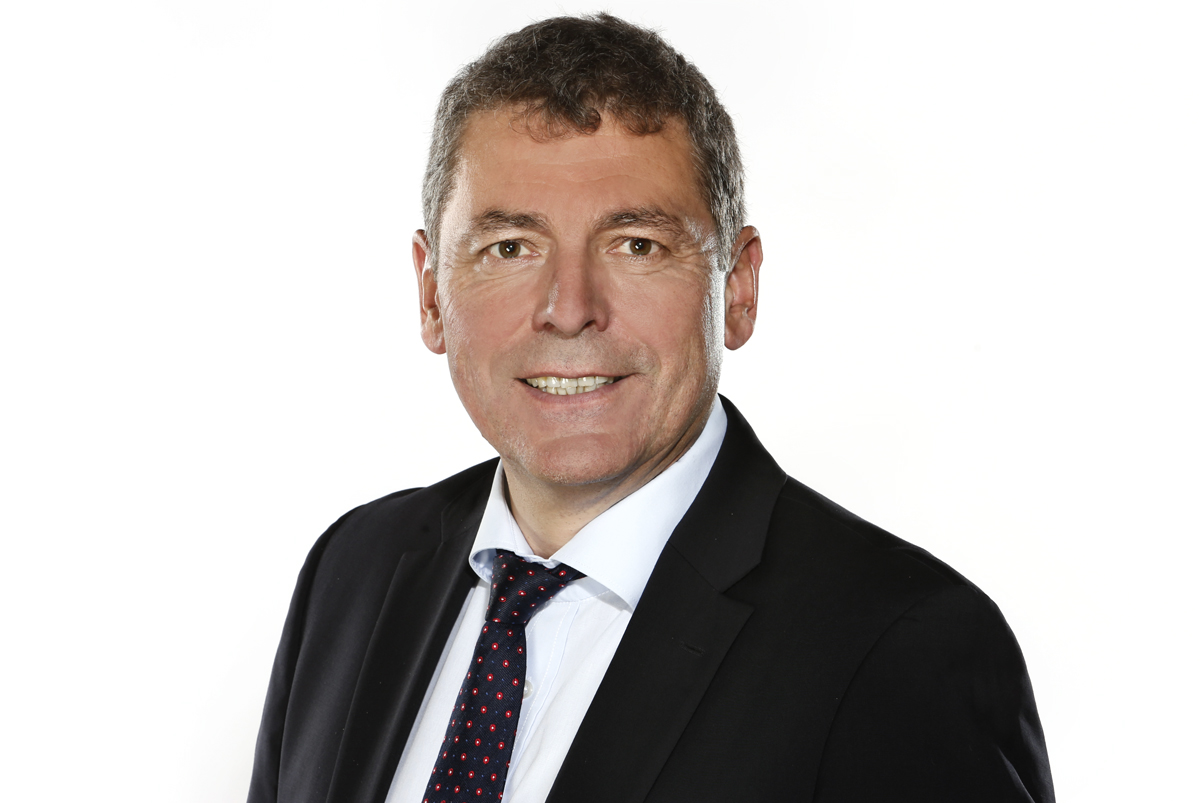
- Born: 5 May 1963 (age 63); Würzburg
- Known for: Empiric research of forensic relevant disorders
- Scientific career
- Fields: Medical specialist for neurology and psychiatry
- Workplaces: University of Göttingen.

Jürgen Leo Müller (born 5 May 1963 in Würzburg) is a German medical specialist for neurology and psychiatry. He is a professor for forensic psychiatry and psychotherapy at the University of Göttingen as well as chief physician for forensic psychiatry and psychotherapy at the Asklepios Clinic in Göttingen. His particular scientific interest lies in the empirical research of forensically relevant disorders with a particular focus on personality disorders, psychotherapy as well as violent and sex offenders. In addition to that he places special emphasis on the usability of empirical techniques to responding legal questions.

== Biography ==
Müller studied human medicine at the University of Würzburg from 1984 to 1990. After his specialist training in neurology and psychiatry he was clinically responsible and scientifically active in forensic psychiatry in Homburg, Saarland, Bern and Regensburg. Müller finished his habilitation at the University of Regensburg with a thesis on the contribution of functional magnetic resonance imaging to the connectivity model of neuro psychiatric diseases in 2003. Since 2006 he has been working as a professor of forensic psychiatry and psychotherapy at the Ludwig Meyer Institute of the University of Göttingen. At the same time Müller is senior consultant of the Asklepios Clinic for Forensic Psychiatry and Psychotherapy Göttingen.

Jürgen Müller is a forensic psychiatric expert in a range of criminal and civil law. Amongst others he was charged as a forensic psychiatric expert with the case of the double-murderer of Bodenfelde (Germany) and with that of the amok driver of Graz (Austria).

== Scientific contribution ==
Müller completed his doctoral thesis in psychiatric history about the Munich psychiatrist and writer Oskar Panizza with summa cum laude. Müller's research has since been focusing on the empirical research of forensically relevant disorders. During his time in Regensburg, he implemented numerous research projects on forensically relevant disorders of personality (“Psychopathy”). As head of the interdisciplinary working group "Emotion processing and emotion regulation" of impulse control he carried out research projects on impulsive control and emotion regulation as well as on reactive and proactive forms of aggression. He conducted studies on paraphilia and pedophilia in Göttingen. He used objective methods such as eye tracking in combination with fMRI to evaluate the potential benefits of using empirical investigator-independent parameters for diagnosis, prognosis and therapy evaluation.

In 2006, Müller was invited to the Lower Saxony State Court Bückeburg and in 2011 to the Federal Constitutional Court, as an expert regarding negotiations of the privatisation of forensic psychiatric facilities. In 2012, he created an expert report for the Federal Constitutional Court on the issue of "mental disorder" as part of the Therapy Accommodation Act. This acted on the arguments given in the case of K. from 2003 to the question on whether society could be protected from highly dangerous, but in legal sense sane, that is legally responsible people with the help of the Bavarian accommodation law.

Müller researched on the problem of false positives (regarding individuals who were detained preemptively even though they might not have gone on to commit a crime) in danger forecasts: The study by Müller et al. on "Recidivism after Final Rejection of a Subsequent Order of Preventive Detention" is continued after including further cases and excerpts from the Federal Central Criminal Register. Catamnesis comprises now a period of 6.5 years and a greater number of cases.

Currently, Müller is involved in the construction and the use of virtual reality in the diagnosis, treatment and risk assessment in forensic psychiatric patients as well as in dangerous offenders in cooperation with the central facility for preventive detention in Lower Saxony Rosdorf. The projects Virprotect (development of a virtual environment for the treatment of child abuse perpetrators), ViVT (development of a virtual environment for the objective detection of sexual interest in prepubescent children) and VIRAC (development of virtual environments for the risk assessment of child abuse perpetrators) aimed at the exploration and use of sex offenders. In addition, an appropriate use in the diagnosis, assessment and treatment of violent offenders is being prepared.

As head of an interdisciplinary working group, which was launched by the scientific society DGPPN (The German Association for Psychiatry, Psychotherapy and Psychosomatics) interdisciplinary working group, Müller works to achieve a consensus for nationwide minimum standards to be established for psychiatric hospital treatment. These aim at establishing professionally anchored lower limits for financial and human resources and call for science-based recommendations on process, structure and outcome of treatments. The need to improve the quality of treatment in psychiatric hospitals has been shown on several levels: by the decisions on preventive detention of the European Court of Human Rights and the German Constitutional Court through the resonance of the public in the event Mollath as well as the hitherto rising numbers of patients in forensic psychiatry.

In 2014, Müller was charged by the Ministry of Social Affairs Rheinland Pfalz with the development of appropriate quality indicators. By the Ministry of Justice of Austria, he was involved as a member of the working group "dangerousness" in the reform of the law. With the support of the Ministry for Social Affairs of Lower Saxony he initiated a study on long-term accommodated patients in forensic psychiatry (> 10 years accommodation duration). Currently, nationwide nearly one third of forensic patients serves sentences longer than 10 years, thus dismissal barriers will be focused on in particular. Since 2012 Müller has been managing a project funded by the state of Lower Saxony, by the University Medical Center Göttingen and the Asklepios GmbH Niedersachsen on the prevention of sexual abuse (PSM). Together with P. Briken, Hamburg and M. Rösler, Homburg, Saar, Müller initiated the conference Empirical Research in forensic psychiatry, psychology, psychotherapy (EFPPP) in 2010. With the aim of encouraging young scientists to do empirical research on forensically relevant disorders, the Ludwig Meyer Prize, the Herrmann Witter Prize and the Eberhardt Schorsch Prize are awarded. Since 2010 Müller is spokesman of the Boeard of Forensic Psychiatry of DGPPN, Between 2012 and 2014 he was a regular member of the board of the DGPPN. Müller is committed to the development of standards of criminal and civil assessment (Müller and Saimeh). Since 2013 he is Chairman of the certification committee of the DGPPN.

== Memberships in scientific organisations ==
Since 2012 Müller has been acting as speaker of the department of Forensic Psychiatry of the German Association for Psychiatry and Psychotherapy, Psychosomatics and Neurology (DGPNN) and head of the certification committee of the DGPPN. Müller was appointed co-organiser of the seminar Forensic Psychiatry in Europe in 2012.

== Publications ==
Books (selection):

- Saimeh, N., Müller, J. L., Nedopil, N., Habermeyer, E., & Falkai, P. (Hrsg.). (2012). Sicherungsverwahrung-wissenschaftliche Basis und Positionsbestimmung: Was folgt nach dem Urteil des Bundesverfassungsgerichts vom 04.05. 2011?. Berlin: Medizinisch Wissenschaftliche Verlagsgesellschaft.
- Müller, J. L. (Hrsg.). (2014). Forensische Begutachtung bei Persönlichkeitsstörungen. Stand und Stellenwert bildgebender Verfahren. Berlin: Medizinisch Wissenschaftliche Verlagsgesellschaft.
- Rösler, M., Müller, J. L., Briken, P., Retz-Junginger, P., Retz, W., & Philipp-Wiegmann, F. (Hrsg.). (2014). EFPPP Jahrbuch 2014 - Empirische Forschung in Forensischer Psychiatrie, Psychotherapie und Psychologie. Berlin: Wissenschaftliche Verlagsgesellschaft.
- Müller, J. L., et al. (Hrsg.): Sicherungsverwahrung - wissenschaftliche Basis und Positionsbestimmung. Was folgt nach dem Urteil des Bundesverfassungsgerichts vom 04.05.2011? MWV Verlag, 2012.
- Nedopil, N. & Müller, J.L. Forensische Psychiatrie. 4., überarbeitete Auflage: Thieme 2012
- Nedopil, N., & Müller, J. L. (Hrsg.). Forensische Psychiatrie - Klinik, Begutachtung und Behandlung zwischen Psychiatrie und Recht (4th ed.). Stuttgart: Thieme 2012.
- Müller, J.L. (Hrsg.) Neurobiologie forensische relevanter Störungen: Kohlhammer 2010
