= René van Rijswijk =

Dutch footballer (born 1971)

Personal information
- Date of birth: 3 January 1971 (age 55)
- Place of birth: Rotterdam, Netherlands
- Height: 1.85 m (6 ft 1 in)
- Position: Forward

Senior career*
| Years | Team | Apps | (Gls) |
| 1993–1995 | RKC | 42 | (6) |
| 1995–1999 | Cambuur | 98 | (19) |
| 1999–2004 | NEC | 123 | (3) |
| 2004–2006 | Cambuur | 51 | (3) |
| Total | | 314 | (31) |
- * Club domestic league appearances and goals

René van Rijswijk (born 3 January 1971) is a Dutch former footballer who played as a forward for RKC, Cambuur and NEC.

He was known for his distinctive appearance, notably his long hair worn in a ponytail, and for his unusually low goalscoring output for a striker, which earned him the nickname De spits zonder doelpunten ("the striker without goals"). He was also known for his relatively low goalscoring output, which earned him the nickname "De spits zonder doelpunten" ("The striker without goals").
