= Jeroen Veldmate =

Dutch footballer (born 1988)

Personal information
- Date of birth: 8 November 1988 (age 37)
- Place of birth: Groningen, Netherlands
- Height: 1.92 m (6 ft 4 in)
- Position: Centre-back

Youth career
- Be Quick 1887
- Groningen

Senior career*
Years	Team	Apps	(Gls)
2007–2011	Groningen	13	(0)
2009–2010	→ Helmond Sport (loan)	29	(4)
2011–2012	Sparta Rotterdam	32	(6)
2012–2015	Heracles Almelo	43	(3)
2015–2017	Viborg	14	(1)
2017–2018	Emmen	33	(2)
2018–2021	Go Ahead Eagles	81	(14)
2021–2023	Emmen	62	(5)
Total		307	(35)
- * Club domestic league appearances and goals

Jeroen Veldmate (born 8 November 1988) is a Dutch former professional footballer who played as a centre-back.

== Career ==
He came through the youth ranks of FC Groningen, making his debut in the 2007–08 season in a 5–1 lost away match against NEC, coming in as a second-half substitute for Koen van de Laak. After playing only seven league matches in two seasons, he signed a loan deal with Helmond Sport, where his brother Mark had just signed. Veldmate made his debut for Helmond Sport in a league win (4–0) against Fortuna Sittard on 7 August 2009. He returned to Groningen after the loan deal, playing only seven matches that season.

On 31 May 2011, he signed with Sparta Rotterdam together with his brother, Mark, for two years.

After one season in Rotterdam, Veldmate signed with Heracles Almelo. Between 2015 and January 2017, Veldmate played in Denmark for Viborg FF, but his contract was terminated after a series of injuries. In the summer of 2017, Veldmate signed for one year with FC Emmen.

On 2 June 2018, Veldmate signed a two-year contract with Go Ahead Eagles.

On 16 June 2021, he returned to Emmen on a one-year deal.

== Honours ==
Individual

- Eredivisie Team of the Month: October 2022,
