= Jesper Rasmussen =

Danish footballer (born 1992)

Personal information
- Full name: Jesper Rewitz Rasmussen
- Date of birth: 4 January 1992 (age 34)
- Place of birth: Esbjerg, Denmark
- Height: 1.84 m (6 ft 0 in)
- Position: Midfielder

Youth career
- Haderslev FK
- 2009–2011: Esbjerg fB

Senior career*
Years	Team	Apps	(Gls)
2011–2016	Esbjerg fB	30	(3)
2015	→ Vejle (loan)	8	(1)
2016	→ Vejle (loan)	1	(0)

International career
2007	Denmark U-16	2	(0)
- * Club domestic league appearances and goals as of 8 May 2020

Jesper Rewitz Rasmussen (born 4 January 1992) is a Danish former professional footballer who played as a midfielder.

== Career ==
Coming through the youth ranks of Haderslev FK, he struggled with injuries through his career. In 2009, he transferred to Esbjerg, and he signed his first professional contract with the club in June 2012.

He made his league debut in a 1–2 home loss against AaB 27 June 2013, coming on as a substitute in the 80th minute. In his second league appearance, in an away match against Brøndby IF, he came on as a substitute for Jakob Ankersen at half time. Rasmussen scored both goals in a game that saw Esbjerg win 0–2.

After two loan spells at Vejle Boldklub, Rasmussen retired from professional football in 2016 after being released by Esbjerg.
