= Rachid El Khalifi =

Dutch footballer

Personal information
- Full name: Rachid El Khalifi
- Date of birth: 16 June 1979 (age 47)
- Place of birth: Rotterdam, Netherlands
- Height: 5 ft 10 in (1.78 m)
- Positions: Midfielder; forward

Team information
- Current team: SC Feyenoord

Senior career*
Years	Team	Apps	(Gls)
2000–2005	Dordrecht	124	(14)
2005–2007	Emmen	72	(12)
2007–2009	Cambuur Leeuwarden	61	(7)
2009	Real Salt Lake	4	(0)
2010–	SC Feyenoord	7	(0)
- * Club domestic league appearances and goals

Rachid El Khalifi (born 16 June 1979 in Rotterdam) is a Dutch footballer, who currently plays for SC Feyenoord.

== Career ==
=== Netherlands ===
Khalifi began his career with Dordrecht in the Dutch Eerste Divisie in 2000, playing over 120 games for the team over 5 seasons before moving to Emmen in 2005. He played in 72 matches for Emmen and scored 12 times in his 2 years with the team, before moving again, this time to Cambuur Leeuwarden in 2007.

Khalifi was a key component to the success of Cambuur's 2008–2009 campaign, which ended with the team finishing with a 20–9–9 record, and a trip to a third-place finish in the Eerste Divisie's regular season standings.

=== United States ===
El Khalifi signed with Real Salt Lake in July 2009, after trialling with them through the 2009 season. He made his RSL debut on 8 August 2009 at Rio Tinto Stadium against Seattle Sounders FC, coming on as a second-half substitute.
