= Dave Osei =

Dutch-Ghanaian footballer

Personal information
- Full name: David Osei
- Date of birth: 7 July 1983 (age 43)
- Place of birth: Amsterdam, Netherlands
- Height: 1.98 m (6 ft 6 in)
- Position: Striker

Team information
- Current team: DWS

Youth career
- –2006: AFC

Senior career*
Years	Team	Apps	(Gls)
2006–2007	Helmond Sport	11	(1)
2007–2008	FC Dordrecht	4	(0)
2008–	DWS		
- * Club domestic league appearances and goals as of 02:16, 30 May 2007 (UTC) ‡ National team caps and goals as of 30 May 2007

Dave Osei (born 7 July 1983) is a Dutch-Ghanaian footballer who plays as a striker for DWS

== Career ==
He began his career at AFC, before 2006 moving to Helmond Sport. He left Helmond 2007 and moved to FC Dordrecht, after one year was released.
