= Mark Veldmate =

Dutch footballer (born 1984)

Personal information
- Full name: Mark Veldmate
- Date of birth: 7 September 1984 (age 42)
- Place of birth: Groningen, Netherlands
- Height: 1.88 m (6 ft 2 in)
- Position: Forward

Youth career
- Be Quick 1887
- Groningen

Senior career*
Years	Team	Apps	(Gls)
2003–2004	Groningen	3	(0)
2005–2006	Emmen	72	(5)
2006–2009	Veendam	50	(12)
2009–2011	Helmond Sport	55	(17)
2011–2012	Sparta Rotterdam	25	(2)
2012–2015	MVV	82	(16)
2015–2017	HHC Hardenberg	44	(4)
2017–2019	Staphorst	?	(?)
- * Club domestic league appearances and goals

Mark Veldmate (born 7 September 1984) is a Dutch former professional footballer who played as a forward.

== Career ==
He started his career with FC Groningen, but making three Eredivisie appearances for the club. In 2005, he moved to FC Emmen, where he made 72 appearances in the Eerste Divisie, scoring 5 goals. In 2006, he signed with BV Veendam, scoring 12 goals in 50 league matches in three years.

In 2009, he signed with Helmond Sport, where his brother Jeroen had just signed a loan deal. He signed a contract keeping him in Helmond until 2011. Veldmate made his debut for Helmond Sport in a league win (4–0) against Fortuna Sittard on 7 August 2009. On 31 May 2011, he signed with Sparta Rotterdam together with his brother, Jeroen, for two years.

As part of amateur club VV Staphorst, he announced his retirement from football in 2019.
