= Hollum =

- Village
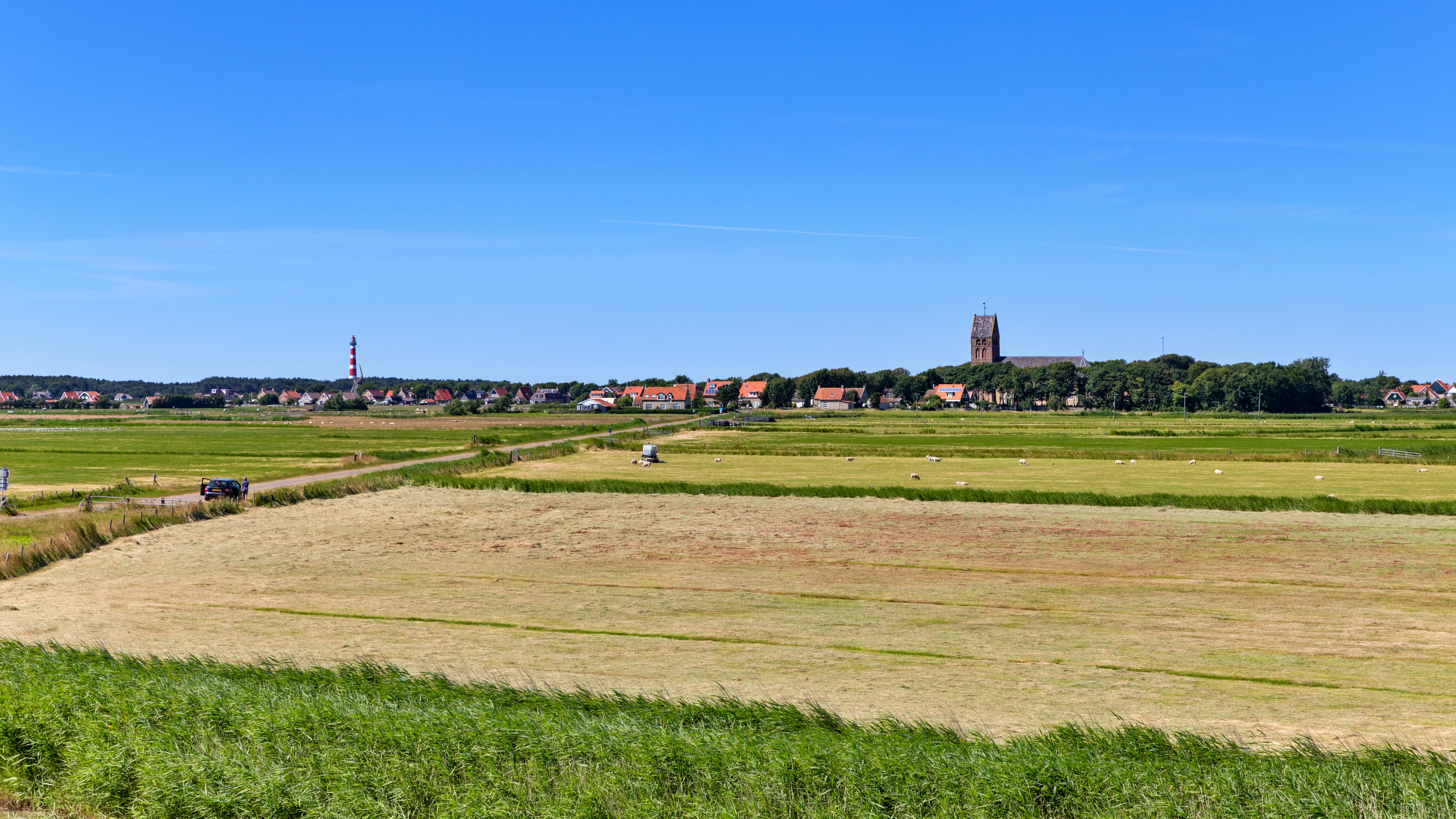
- Hollum

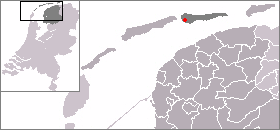
- Location in Ameland municipality

- Location in the province of Friesland Hollum (Netherlands)
- Coordinates: 53°25′N 5°38′E
- Country: Netherlands
- Province: Friesland
- Municipality: Ameland

Area
  - Total: 12.77 km^{2} (4.93 sq mi)
- Elevation: 2.2 m (7.2 ft)

Population (2021)
  - Total: 1,285
  - Density: 100.6/km^{2} (260.6/sq mi)
- Time zone: UTC+1 (CET)
  - Summer (DST): UTC+2 (CEST)
- Postal code: 9161
- Dialing code: 0519

Hollum (Dutch pronunciation: [ˈɦɔlʏm]) is the largest village on Ameland, Netherlands, one of the West Frisian Islands. It is situated on the westernmost part of the island and had, as of January 2017, a population of 1,165.

The village was first mentioned in 1485 as Hollum, and could mean "settlement on a hill/island", however there are more possibilities. Hollum developed as an esdorp in the Late Middle Ages. It was originally two settlements which have grown together.

== Culture ==
Prominent in the village is a Dutch Reformed church with foundations from the 12th century and a lighthouse, which is 59 m high, dating from 1880. Another notable feature is the Commandeur huuskes. Commandeur refers to the captain of a whaling ship, as were used during the 18th century to hunt in the Arctic Ocean.

Another notable tourist attraction is the Sorgdragersmuseum, a history museum. The smock mill De Verwachting is in working order.

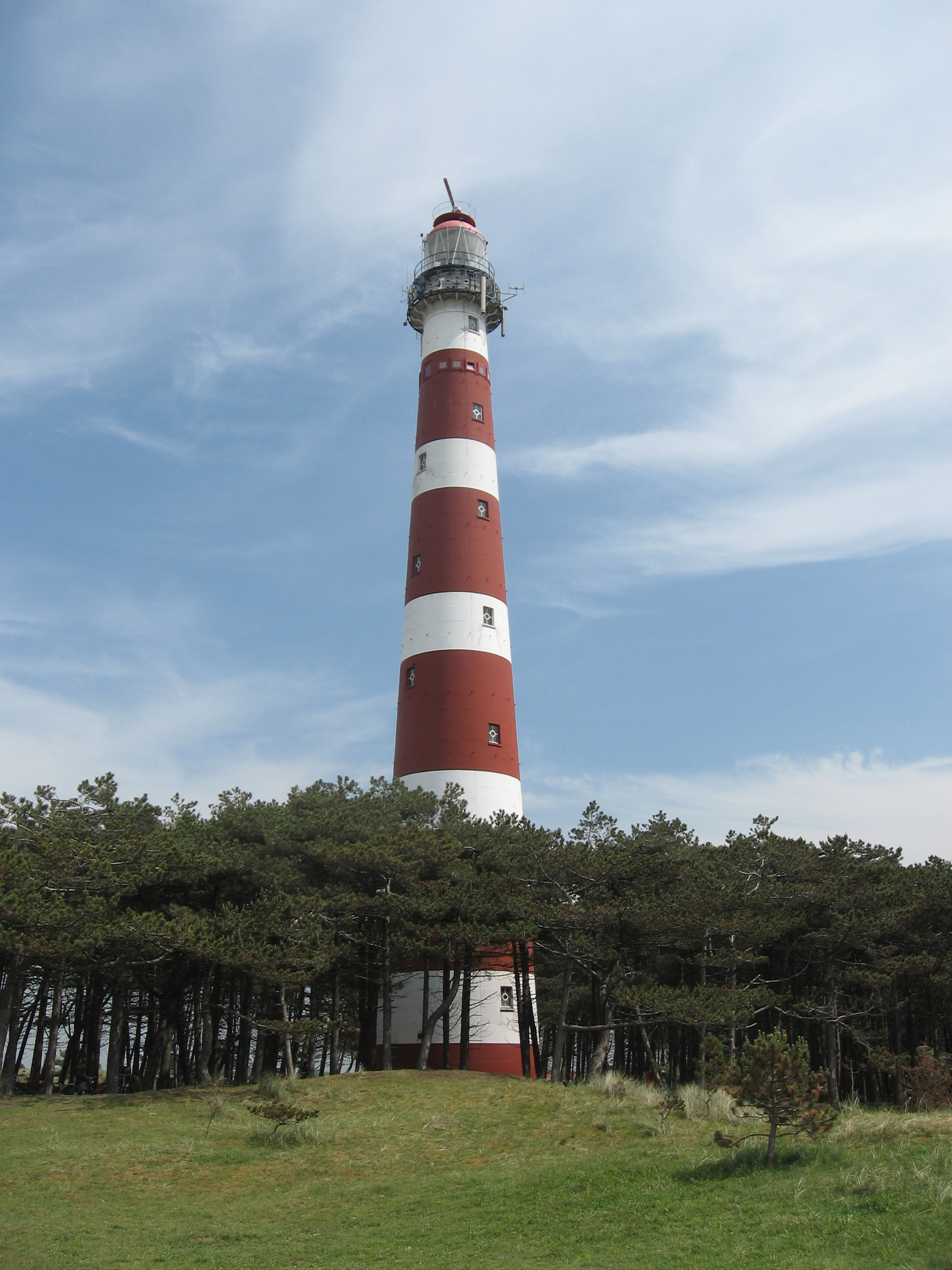
lighthouse Bornrif

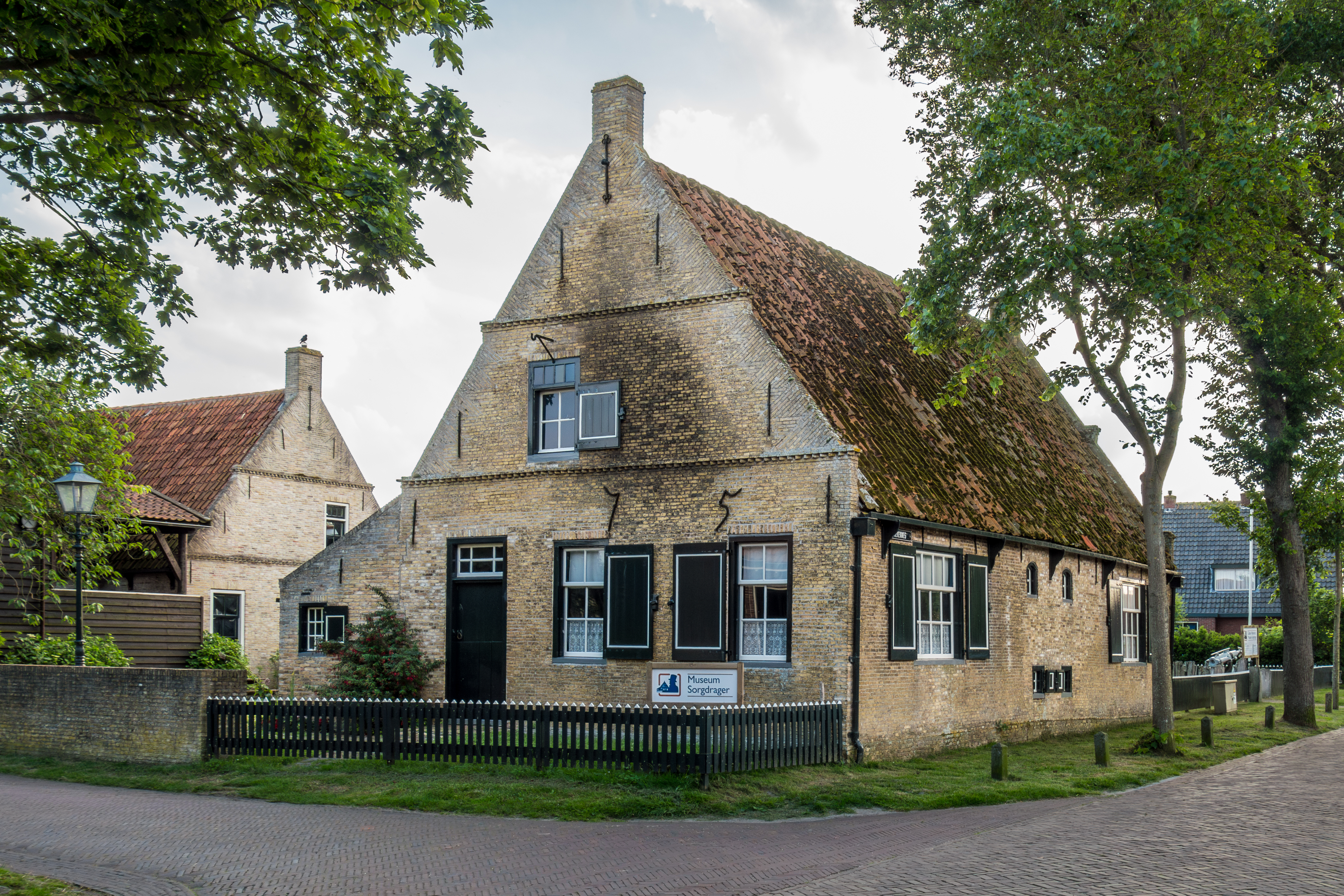
Museum Sorgdrager

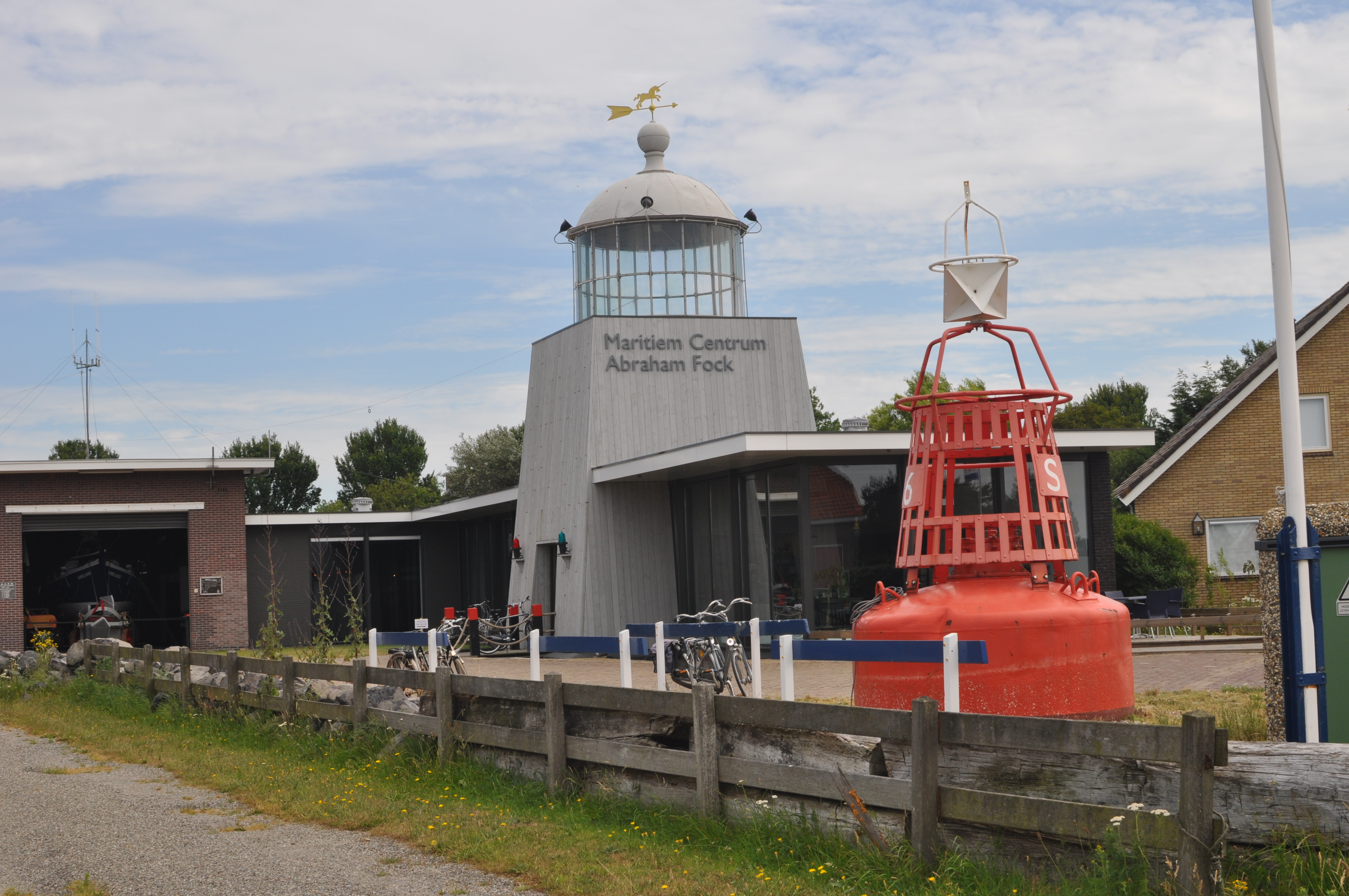
maritime museum

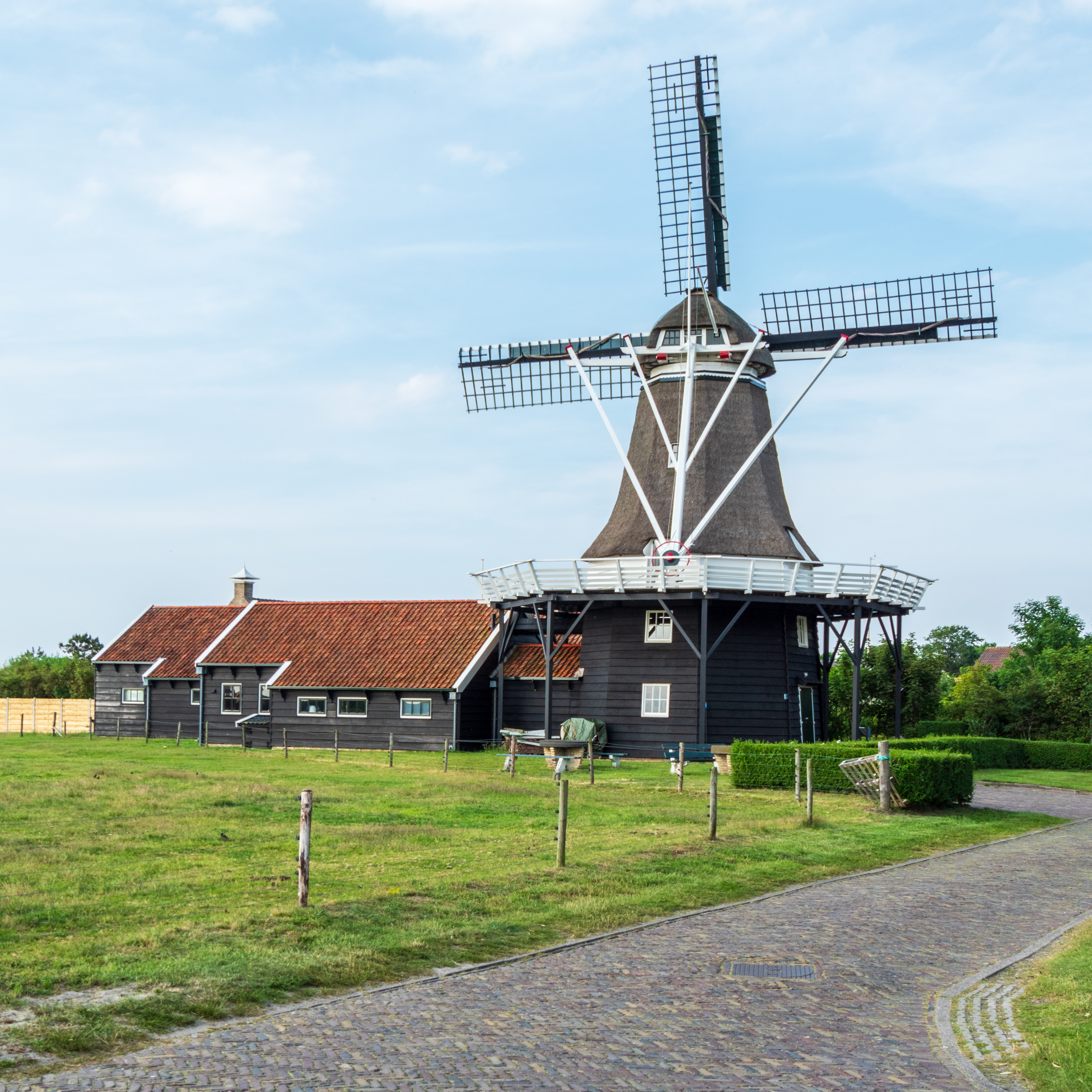
Windmill De Verwachting
