= Revy Rosalia =

Netherlands Antilles footballer (born 1982)

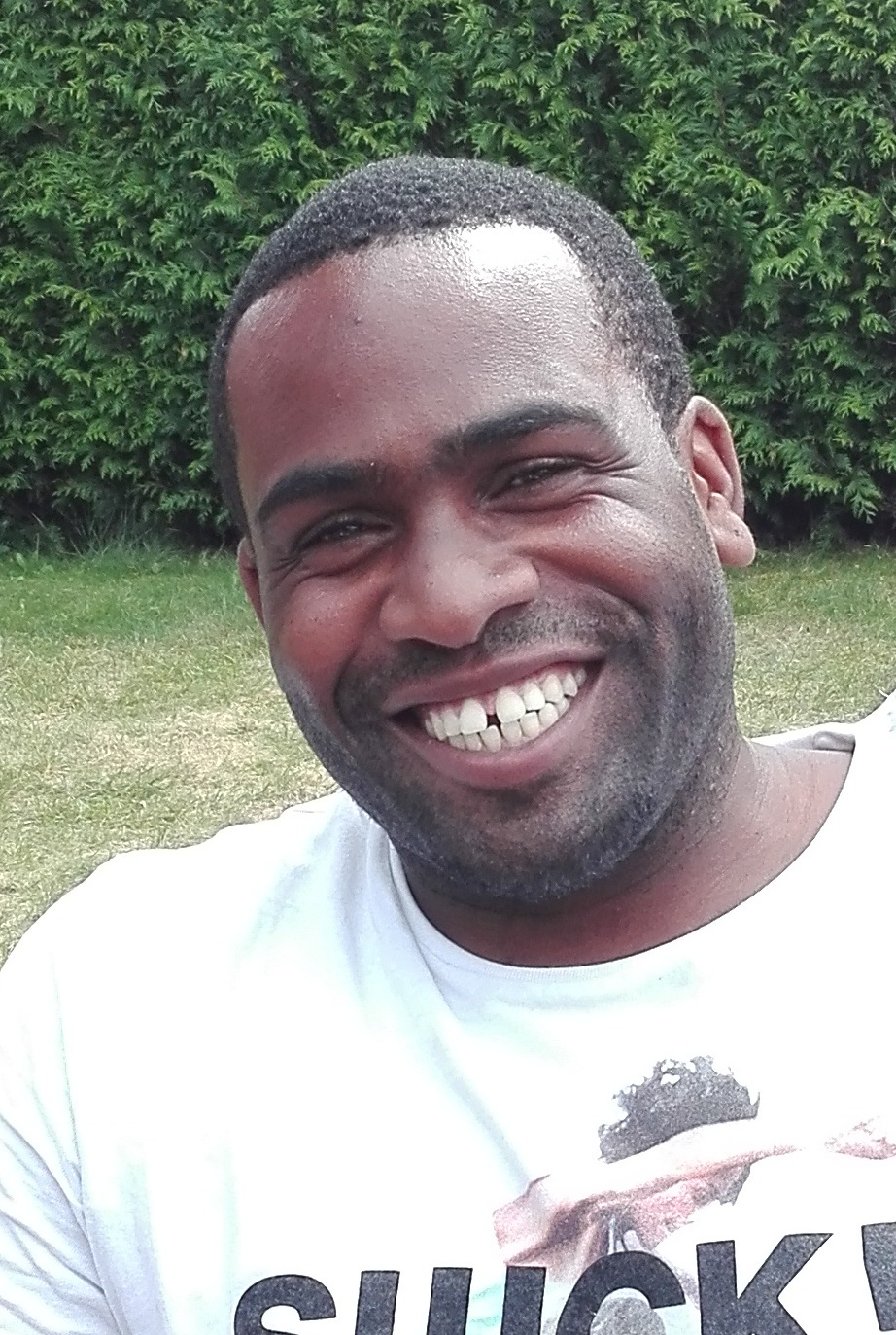
- Rosalia (2016)

Personal information
- Date of birth: December 9, 1982 (age 43)
- Place of birth: Rotterdam, Netherlands
- Position: Midfielder

Team information
- Current team: ADO Den Haag (U16 manager)

Youth career
- ADO Den Haag

Senior career*
| Years | Team | Apps | (Gls) |
| 2000–2003 | ADO Den Haag | 13 | (0) |
| 2004–2005 | HFC Haarlem | 44 | (6) |
| 2005–2008 | TOP Oss | 80 | (15) |
| 2008–2011 | VV Baronie | | |
| 2011–2013 | Lienden | 44 | (4) |
| 2013–2016 | VV Dongen | | |
| 2016–2017 | DHC | | |

International career
| 2008 | Netherlands Antilles | 4 | (0) |

Managerial career
- 201?–201?: VV Dongen (U15)
- 2017–2018: DHC (U17)
- 2018–2019: DHC (U19)
- 2019–2020: Alphense Boys (U19)
- 2020–2021: ADO Den Haag (U17 assistant)
- 2021–: ADO Den Haag (U16)
- * Club domestic league appearances and goals

Revy Rosalia (born 9 December 1982) is a retired Netherlands Antilles footballer. She is currently working as a youth coach at ADO Den Haag.

== Coaching career ==
After coaching the U15s at VV Dongen and U17/U19s at DHC, he was appointed U-19 manager at Alphense Boys in February 2019.

Ahead of the 2020–21 season, Rosalia was appointed U17 assistant coach at his former club, ADO Den Haag. In the 2021–22 season, he was in charge of the U16s.
