= Silvino Soares =

Cape Verdean footballer

Personal information
- Full name: Silvino Gomes Soares
- Date of birth: 10 July 1978 (age 48)
- Place of birth: Santiago do Cacém, Portugal
- Position: Forward

Senior career*
Years	Team	Apps	(Gls)
1996–2003	Vasco da Gama Sines		
2003–2004	Badajoz B		
2004–2006	Excelsior Maassluis		
2006–2007	FC Zwolle	34	(11)
2007–2009	Red Star Waasland	67	(12)
2009–2010	ASWH		
2010–2011	FC 's-Gravenzande		
2011–2013	VV Pernis		

International career
2008	Cape Verde	3	(0)
- * Club domestic league appearances and goals

Silvino Gomes Soares (born 10 July 1978) is a former professional footballer who played as a forward, notably for FC Zwolle in the Netherlands and K.V. Red Star Waasland in Belgium. Born in Portugal, he made three appearances for Cape Verde national team.

== Career ==
In summer 2006, after playing for Belgian club Red Star Waasland, Soares trialled with Dutch club FC Zwolle and earned a one-year contract.
