= Cecílio Lopes =

Cape Verdean footballer

Personal information
- Date of birth: 18 March 1979 (age 47)
- Place of birth: Rotterdam, Netherlands
- Height: 1.84 m (6 ft 1/2 in)
- Position: Striker

Senior career*
Years	Team	Apps	(Gls)
1999–2005	Excelsior	101	(27)
2005–2007	Dordrecht	58	(35)
2007–2010	Heerenveen	0	(0)
2007–2008	→ Sparta Rotterdam (loan)	9	(2)
2008	→ Volendam (loan)	4	(0)
2009	→ Dordrecht (loan)	17	(12)
2009–2010	→ Zwolle (loan)	27	(8)
2010–2012	Dordrecht	62	(25)
2014–	Capelle	13	(3)

International career^{‡}
2008	Cape Verde	2	(0)
- * Club domestic league appearances and goals as of 17:10, 12 July 2012 (UTC) ‡ National team caps and goals as of 17:10, 12 July 2010 (UTC)

Cecílio Lopes (born 18 March 1979) is a Cape Verdean international footballer who plays as a striker for Capelle in the Dutch Topklasse.

== Club career ==
Lopes formerly played for SBV Excelsior, FC Dordrecht, Sparta Rotterdam, FC Volendam and FC Zwolle.

== International career ==
Born in the Netherlands, Lopes was eligible to play for the Cape Verde national football team through his father. He received his first call up in May 2008.
