= Mourad Mghizrat =

Moroccan footballer

Personal information
- Date of birth: 7 September 1974 (age 52)
- Place of birth: Fez, Morocco
- Height: 1.90 m (6 ft 3 in)
- Position: Forward

Team information
- Current team: Quick Boys (assistant)

Youth career
- TONEGIDO
- ONA
- GC&FC Olympia
- –1995: Sparta Rotterdam

Senior career*
Years	Team	Apps	(Gls)
1996–1999	Sparta Rotterdam	47	(3)
1998–1999	→ Utrecht (loan)	12	(1)
1999–2000	→ Den Bosch (loan)	9	(1)
1999–2002	Den Bosch	64	(13)
2003–2004	Willem II	21	(3)
2003–2004	→ Emmen (loan)	28	(8)
2004–2005	→ Den Bosch (loan)	22	(1)
2005–2007	Emmen	65	(29)
2007–2015	Haaglandia	159	(44)
2015–2016	Westlandia	1	(1)
Total		428	(104)

International career
1997	Morocco	1	(0)

Managerial career
- 2016–2019: Westlandia (assistant)
- 2019–2020: Sparta Rotterdam (youth)
- 2020–: Quick Boys (assistant)
- * Club domestic league appearances and goals

Mourad Mghizrat (Arabic: مراد مغيزرات; born 7 September 1974) is a Moroccan former professional footballer who played as a forward. He is currently assistant coach at Quick Boys.

== Club career ==
Mghizrat started his career with TONEGIDO, ONA and GC&FC Olympia, before moving to the academy of Sparta Rotterdam. He moved to the professional first team in 1996, making his senior debut on 31 May 1997 as a second-half substitute for Gregg Berhalter in a 1–3 home loss to RKC Waalwijk. In the 1998–99 season he was loaned to Utrecht. In January 2000, he signed for relegation candidate Den Bosch on loan. In that season he could not keep Den Bosch in the Eredivisie. In his second season at Den Bosch he promoted with the club. When Wiljan Vloet was trainer, Mghizrat played a strong season with fellow striker Bart Van Den Eede. In spite of his strong season, Den Bosch were relegated again, this time through play-offs.

After Den Bosch's relegation Mghizrat signed a three-year contract with Willem II. He played most of the matches the first season, but in his second season he only played two matches for Willem II. He had two loan spells, at FC Emmen in the 2003–04 season and again at Den Bosch in the 2004–05 season, before signing permanently with Emmen in 2005. By scoring 29 goals in 63 matches he appeared as an effective goal scorer, however the club did not want to extend his contract.

In 2007, he was close to sign a contract with Austrian Football First League club DSV Leoben. Financial problems, however, made the transfer impossible. Instead, he would move to Dutch amateur club Haaglandia in Rijswijk.

== International career ==
Mghizrat gained one international cap for Morocco, as a substitute in a 3–0 friendly win over Togo on 26 November 1997.

== Coaching career ==
In June 2016, he became assistant manager at amateur club Westlandia. He also worked with youths at his former club Sparta Rotterdam.

In April 2020, Mghizrat was appointed the new assistant manager at Quick Boys to head coach Edwin Grünholz.
