= Dirk Jan Derksen =

Dutch footballer

Personal information
- Full name: Dirk Jan Derksen
- Date of birth: 17 June 1972 (age 54)
- Place of birth: Tiel, Netherlands
- Height: 1.76 m (5 ft 9 in)
- Position: Striker

Youth career
- Theole
- Den Bosch

Senior career*
Years	Team	Apps	(Gls)
1990–1993	BVV Den Bosch	79	(21)
1993–1995	Roda JC	17	(2)
1994	→ MVV (loan)	16	(2)
1995–1998	Dordrecht '90	52	(20)
1998–2000	Zwolle	67	(32)
2000–2001	Austria Wien	18	(3)
2001–2003	Cambuur	33	(6)
2003–2004	Emmen	34	(14)
2004–2005	Fortuna Sittard	34	(18)
2005–2006	Roda JC	6	(0)
2006–2007	VVV	47	(23)
2007–2008	Fortuna Sittard	30	(6)
2008–2009	Helmond Sport	31	(9)
Total		464	(156)

International career
1993	Netherlands U21	1	(0)
- * Club domestic league appearances and goals as of 16:15, 30 September 2009 (UTC)

Dirk Jan Derksen (born 17 June 1972) is a Dutch retired footballer. He is one of few players who has played for all Limburgian professional clubs (MVV, VVV, Fortuna Sittard and Roda JC).

== Playing career ==
=== Club ===
A prolific striker, Derksen played the large part of his career in the Dutch Eerste Divisie and also had a spell with Austrian giants Austria Wien.

He retired from professional football as part of Helmond Sport in 2009. He would instead continue as an amateur player at EVV Echt while pursuing a managerial career on the side.

=== International ===
Derksen played once for the Netherlands national under-21 football team.

== Managerial career ==
After retiring as a player, Derksen worked for VVV's commercial department and in 2011 he was named assistant to Willem II manager Jurgen Streppel. He joined former club Roda JC as a youth coach in 2013. He later worked as a scout for FC Groningen and SC Heerenveen and was named technical manager at Helmond Sport in 2026.

== Personal life ==
He is the cousin of sports journalist and former player Johan Derksen.
