= Ahmed Ahahaoui =

Dutch professional footballer

Personal information
- Date of birth: 6 December 1983 (age 42)
- Place of birth: Amsterdam, Netherlands
- Height: 1.78 m (5 ft 10 in)
- Position: Winger

Youth career
- Stormvogels Telstar
- Vitesse
- 2004–2005: Sparta Rotterdam

Senior career*
| Years | Team | Apps | (Gls) |
| 2005–2007 | Haarlem | 76 | (27) |
| 2007–2009 | Go Ahead Eagles | 67 | (16) |
| 2009–2011 | VVV-Venlo | 57 | (6) |
| 2011–2012 | FC Volendam | 29 | (12) |
| 2013–2015 | IJsselmeervogels | 48 | (10) |
| 2015–2016 | De Meern | 10 | (2) |
| 2016–2018 | De Dijk | 30 | (7) |
| 2018–2020 | HBOK | | |
| 2020– | Blauw-Wit | | |
- * Club domestic league appearances and goals as of 17 May 2018

Ahmed Ahahaoui (born 6 December 1983) is a Dutch professional footballer who last played for Blauw-Wit.

== Club career ==
Born in Amsterdam to Moroccan parents, he formerly played for Haarlem and Go Ahead Eagles, before joining VVV-Venlo in 2009. In 2010, he announced he was leaving them and wanted to find a club abroad. He ended up at FC Volendam, before moving to Topklasse outfit IJsselmeervogels.

In summer 2015, Ahahaoui joined Dutch Hoofdklasser VV De Meern, only to leave for De Dijk in summer 2016.
