= Niki Leferink =

Dutch footballer

Personal information
- Full name: Niki Leferink
- Date of birth: 12 February 1976 (age 50)
- Place of birth: Haaksbergen, Netherlands
- Height: 1.91 m (6 ft 3 in)
- Position: Striker

Senior career*
Years	Team	Apps	(Gls)
1994–1999	SC Heracles	139	(25)
1999–2001	VVV-Venlo	36	(3)
2001–2004	Go Ahead Eagles	84	(27)
2004–2008	Emmen	91	(29)
2008–2011	Excelsior '31		
2011–2012	DETO		
- * Club domestic league appearances and goals

Niki Leferink (born 12 February 1976) is a Dutch former footballer who played as a striker. He ended his professional career in 2008. Leferink played a total number of 350 games in Dutch professional football.
