= 2008–09 FC Emmen season =

Dutch football club season

FC Emmen
2008–09 season
- Stadium: De Oude Meerdijk
- Eerste Divisie: 9th
- KNVB Cup: 2nd round
- Top goalscorer: League: Roy Stroeve (13 goals); All: Roy Stroeve (13 goals)
- Biggest win: 2-0 (HFC Haarlem (h) 15th week SC Telstar (a) 19th week Excelsior Rotterdam (a) 34th week)
- Biggest defeat: 5-0 (FC Den Bosch (a) 11th week FC Twente (h) KNVB 2nd round)

The 2008–09 season marked FC Emmen's 24th consecutive campaign in the Eerste Divisie, the second division of Dutch football. The club concluded the league season in 13th place, while their participation in the KNVB Cup came to an end in the second round after a 5–0 defeat against FC Twente.

Roy Stroeve emerged as Emmen's top scorer with 13 league goals. He also recorded the highest number of appearances for the club, featuring in 38 competitive matches, including 37 in the Eerste Divisie and one in the KNVB Cup.

== Players ==
=== First-team squad ===
As of 1 January 2009

Note: Flags indicate national team as defined under FIFA eligibility rules; some limited exceptions apply. Players may hold more than one non-FIFA nationality.

No.	Pos.	Nation	Player
1	GK	NED	Ronald Koeman Jr.
2	DF	NED	Jeff Hardeveld
3	DF	NED	Mitch Apau
3	DF	NED	Gerald Alders
4	DF	SUR	Marjan Olfers
4	DF	FRA	Abdelnour Soualhia
5	MF	NED	Prince Aning
6	MF	CUW	Isaiah Ahmed
7	FW	POR	Rui Mendes
8	FW	TUR	Emirhan Demircan
9	FW	NED	Jelani Seedorf
9	FW	NED	Cain Seedorf
11	FW	ISL	Nökkvi Þeyr Þórisson

No.	Pos.	Nation	Player
11	FW	NED	Soufiane Hetli
14	MF	NED	Harrie Kuster
16	DF	NED	Sem Valk
17	MF	NED	Nils Rossen
18	DF	NED	Gabi Caschili
19	FW	NED	Fabiano Rust
21	FW	NED	Fofin Turay
23	MF	NED	Noach Shenkman
25	MF	NED	Tyrone Owusu
27	FW	NED	Patrick Brouwer
28	DF	SUR	Rojendro Oudsten
42	DF	CUW	Ar'jany Martha
43	DF	BEL	Marvin Peersman

== Transfers ==
=== In ===
Pos.	Player	Transferred from	Fee	Date
FW	(Iran) Reza Ghoochannejhad	(Netherlands) SC Heerenveen	On loan	1 January 2009
FW	(Hungary) Tamás Germán	(Hungary) Pápai FC	On loan	1 January 2009

=== Out ===
Pos.	Player	Transferred from	Fee	Date
FW	(Slovenia) Tim Matavž	(Netherlands) FC Groningen	End of loan	31 December 2008

== Competitions ==
=== Overall record ===
Competition	First match	Last match	Starting round	Final position	Record							
Competition	First match	Last match	Starting round	Final position	Pld	W	D	L	GF	GA	GD	Win %
Eerste Divisie	8 August 2008	8 May 2009	Week 1	13th	38	13	8	17	48	68	−20	34.21
KNVB Cup	24 September 2008	24 September 2008	2nd round	2nd round	1	0	0	1	0	5	−5	0.00
Total					39	13	8	18	48	73	−25	33.33

Source: ESPN

=== Eerste Divisie ===
==== Results summary ====
Overall								Home						Away					
Pld	W	D	L	GF	GA	GD	Pts	W	D	L	GF	GA	GD	W	D	L	GF	GA	GD
38	13	8	17	48	68	−20	47	8	4	7	30	33	−3	5	4	10	18	35	−17

Last updated: 8 May 2009.
Source: https://www.espn.nl/voetbal/team/scorebord/_/id/3707/competitie/NED.2/season/2008/

==== Results by round ====
Round	1	2	3	4	5	6	7	8	9	10	11	12	13	14	15	16	17	18	19	20	21	22	23	24	25	26	27	28	29	30	31	32	33	34	35	36	37	38
Ground	A	H	H	A	A	H	A	A	H	H	A	A	H	A	H	H	A	H	A	H	A	A	H	A	H	A	H	H	A	H	A	H	H	A	A	H	A	H
Result	W	D	W	L	L	L	L	L	D	W	L	D	L	L	W	L	D	D	W	L	W	D	L	L	W	L	W	W	D	W	W	L	D	W	L	L	W	W
Position																																						13

Source: https://www.espn.nl/voetbal/team/scorebord/_/id/3707/competitie/NED.2/season/2008/ ESPN
A = Away; H = Home; W = Win; D = Draw; L = Loss

=== Matches ===
==== 1st half ====
8 August 2008 1st week	Fortuna Sittard	1–2	FC Emmen	Sittard
20:00	Sebastiano Garlisi 58'	Report	Roy Stroeve 47'; Tim Matavž 90'	Stadium: Fortuna Stadion

15 August 2008 2nd week	FC Emmen	1–1	Helmond Sport	Emmen
20:00	Morten Friis Jensen 90+3'	Report	Daniel Guijo-Velasco 5'	Stadium: Unive Stadion

22 August 2008 3rd week	FC Emmen	2–1	FC Dordrecht	Emmen
20:00	Jesse Schotman 42' 45'	Report	Eddy Putter 65'	Stadium: Unive Stadion

29 August 2008 4th week	SC Cambuur	6–2	FC Emmen	Leeuwarden
20:00	Sandor van der Heide 7'; Nassir Maachi 13' 38'; Danny Guijt 62'; Ruud ter Heide 77'; Mark de Vries 85'	Report	Tim Matavž 55' 84'	Stadium: Cambuur Stadion

5 September 2008 5th week	TOP Oss	1–1	FC Emmen	Oss
20:00	Tony de Groot 87' 88'	Report	Roy Stroeve 61'	Stadium: Heesen Yachts Stadion

12 September 2008 6th week	FC Emmen	0–2	Excelsior Rotterdam	Emmen
20:00		Report	Rene van Dieren 81'; Robert Braber 87'	Stadium: Unive Stadion

15 September 2008 7th week	PEC Zwolle	4–0	FC Emmen	Zwolle
20:00	Zdenko Kapralik 24'; Dave Huymans 26'; Thiago Grizolli 34'; Johan Plat 89'	Report		Stadium: Oosterenkstadion

19 September 2008 8th week	RBC Roosendaal	2–1	FC Emmen	Roosendaal
20:00	Patrick Duarte 12'; Sjoerd Ars 80'	Report	Roy Stroeve 90'	Stadium: RBC Stadion

27 September 2008 9th week	FC Emmen	1–1	MVV Maastricht	Emmen
19:30	Tim Matavž 29'	Report	Gunter Thiebaut 73'	Stadium: Unive Stadion

3 October 2008 10th week	FC Emmen	2–1	Almere City FC	Emmen
20:00	Niek Ripson 33'; Roy Stroeve 54'	Report	Jamal Dibi 29'	Stadium: Unive Stadion

10 October 2008 11th week	FC Den Bosch	5–0	FC Emmen	's-Hertogenbosch
20:00	Yoann de Boer 3'; Mohamed El Makrini 49'; Koen van der Biezen 54' (pen.); Adnan Barakat 59' 73'	Report		Stadium: De Vliert

17 October 2008 12th week	FC Eindhoven	2–2	FC Emmen	Eindhoven
20:00	Serhat Koç 5'; Tim Nelemans 67'	Report	Roy Stroeve 22'; Kiran Bechan 29'	Stadium: Jan Louwers Stadion

24 October 2008 13th week	FC Emmen	2–3	AGOVV	Emmen
20:00	Roy Stroeve 7'; Tim Matavž 63'	Report	Nacer Chadli 14' 81'; Julius Wille 39'	Stadium: Unive Stadion

31 October 2008 14th week	RKC Waalwijk	1–0	FC Emmen	Waalwijk
20:00	Kevin Vink 41'	Report		Stadium: Mandemakers Stadion

7 November 2008 15th week	FC Emmen	2–0	HFC Haarlem	Emmen
20:00	Kevin Görtz 19'; Marcel Pannekoek 77'	Report		Stadium: Unive Stadion

15 November 2008 16th week	FC Emmen	2–4	VVV-Venlo	Emmen
19:30	Roy Stroeve 18'; Geoffrey Verweij 40'	Report	Sandro Calabro 23' 25' 55' (pen.); Ken Leemans 79'	Stadium: Unive Stadion

21 November 2008 17th week	BV Veendam	1–1	FC Emmen	Veendam
20:00	Ewald Koster 73'	Report	Roy Stroeve 50'	Stadium: De Langeleegte

30 November 2008 18th week	FC Emmen	2–2	Go Ahead Eagles	Emmen
14:30	Marcel Pannekoek 9'; Geoffrey Verweij 35'	Report	Rence van der Wal 38'; Jeffrey Vlug 76'	Stadium: Unive Stadion

5 December 2008 19th week	SC Telstar	0–2	FC Emmen	Velsen-Zuid
20:00		Report	Rob Haemhouts 33'; Roy Stroeve 61'	Stadium: Sportpark Schoonenberg

12 December 2008 20th week	FC Emmen	1–2	Fortuna Sittard	Emmen
20:00	Roy Stroeve 37'	Report	Rick Geenen 14'; Jürgen Heinrichs 58'	Stadium: Unive Stadion

==== 2nd half ====
16 January 2009 21st week	Almere City FC	1–0	FC Emmen	Almere
20:00	Mitchell Kappenberg 51'	Report		Stadium: Yanmar Stadion

19 January 2009 22nd week	MVV Maastricht	1–1	FC Emmen	Maastricht
20:00	Bülent Akın 59'	Report	Marcel Pannekoek 26'	Stadium: De Geusselt

23 January 2009 23rd week	FC Emmen	1–4	FC Eindhoven	Emmen
20:00	Kevin van Assauw 37' (o.g.)	Report	Serhat Koç 2'; Rob van Boekel 61'; Jose Valencia 66'; Tim Nelemans 86' (pen.)	Stadium: Unive Stadion

30 January 2009 24th week	FC Dordrecht	1–0	FC Emmen	Dordrecht
20:00	Ruud Kras 7'	Report		Stadium: Stadion Krommedijk

6 February 2009 25th week	FC Emmen	3–2	SC Cambuur	Emmen
20:00	Rick ten Voorde 55' 90+4'; Kiran Bechan 89'	Report	Jeffrey de Visscher 35'; Sandor van der Heide 38'	Stadium: Unive Stadion

13 February 2009 26th week	Helmond Sport	3–1	FC Emmen	Helmond
20:00	Marc Höcher 34' (pen.) 59' 87'	Report	Rick ten Voorde 52'	Stadium: Stadion De Braak

20 February 2009 27th week	FC Emmen	1–0	PEC Zwolle	Emmen
20:00	Rob Haemhouts 90+1'	Report		Stadium: Unive Stadion

27 February 2009 28th week	FC Emmen	1–0	RBC Roosendaal	Emmen
20:00	Rick ten Voorde 3'	Report		Stadium: Unive Stadion

6 March 2009 29th week	AGOVV	1–1	FC Emmen	Apeldoorn
20:00	Hans van de Haar 79'	Report	Reza Ghoochannejhad 31'	Stadium: Sportpark Berg & Bos

14 March 2009 30th week	FC Emmen	3–2	BV Veendam	Emmen
19:30	Rahim Ouedraogo 5'; Roy Stroeve 8'; Kiran Bechan 85'	Report	Serdar Öztürk 23'; Angelo Zimmerman 89'	Stadium: Unive Stadion

20 March 2009 31st week	Go Ahead Eagles	0–1	FC Emmen	Deventer
20:00		Report	Morten Friis Jensen 90+1'	Stadium: De Adelaarshorst

27 March 2009 32nd week	FC Emmen	0–2	SC Telstar	Emmen
20:00		Report	Bob Koning 15'; Raymond Fafiani 90+2'	Stadium: Unive Stadion

3 April 2009 33rd week	FC Emmen	4–4	TOP Oss	Emmen
20:00	Marcel Pannekoek 65'; Roy Stroeve 66'; Rick ten Voorde 75' 88'	Report	Karim Fachtali 11' 12'; Aziz Moutawakil 51'; Bart van Hintum 87'	Stadium: Unive Stadion

10 April 2009 34th week	Excelsior Rotterdam	0–2	FC Emmen	Rotterdam
20:00		Report	Rick ten Voorde 60'; Roy Stroeve 61'	Stadium: Stadion Woudestein

17 April 2009 35th week	VVV-Venlo	4–0	FC Emmen	Venlo
20:00	Sandro Calabro 5'; Samir El Gaaouiri 23' 43'; Keisuke Honda 54'	Report		Stadium: Seacon Stadion

24 April 2009 36th week	FC Emmen	0–1	FC Den Bosch	Emmen
20:00		Report	Adnan Barakat 79'	Stadium: Unive Stadion

1 May 2009 37th week	HFC Haarlem	0–1	FC Emmen	Haarlem
20:00		Report	Rick ten Voorde 15'	Stadium: Haarlem Stadion

8 May 2009 38th week	FC Emmen	2–1	RKC Waalwijk	Emmen
20:00	Morten Friis Jensen 60'; Rick ten Voorde 78'	Report	Ruud Berger 53'	Stadium: Unive Stadion

=== KNVB Cup ===
24 September 2008 2nd round	FC Emmen	0–5	FC Twente	Emmen
18:45		Report	Theo Janssen 12'; Youssouf Hersi 26'; Stein Huysegems 54'; Eljero Elia 65' 89'	Stadium: Unive Stadion

== Statistics ==
=== Scorers ===
#	Player	Eerste Divisie
1	(Netherlands) Roy Stroeve	13
2	(Netherlands) Rick ten Voorde	9
3	(Slovenia) Tim Matavž	5
4	(Netherlands) Marcel Pannekoek	4
5	(Netherlands) Kiran Bechan	3
5	(Denmark) Morten Friis Jensen	3
7	(Netherlands) Geoffrey Verweij	2
7	(Netherlands) Jesse Schotman	2
7	(Netherlands) Niek Ripson	2
7	(Belgium) Robbie Haemhouts	2
11	(Netherlands) Kevin Görtz	1
11	(Burkina Faso) Rahim Ouédraogo	1
11	(Iran) Reza Ghoochannejhad	1

=== Appearances ===
#	Player	Eerste Divisie	KNVB	Total
1	(Netherlands) Roy Stroeve	37	1	38
2	(Netherlands) Geoffrey Verweij	35	1	36
2	(Netherlands) Niek Ripson	35	1	36
4	(Netherlands) Mark Bevaart	31	0	31
4	(Netherlands) Marcel Pannekoek	30	1	31
6	(Netherlands) Michael van der Kruis	29	1	30
7	(Denmark) Thomas Villadsen	25	0	25
8	(Netherlands) Kiran Bechan	24	0	24
8	(Netherlands) Jesse Schotman	23	1	24
10	(Netherlands) Sieme Zijm	23	0	23
11	(Belgium) Robbie Haemhouts	22	0	22
12	(Netherlands) Kevin Görtz	18	1	19
13	(Netherlands) Rick ten Voorde	18	0	18
13	(Netherlands) Rogier Krohne	17	1	18
15	(Netherlands) Guus de Vries	17	0	17
16	(Denmark) Morten Friis Jensen	15	1	16
16	(Netherlands) Robin Demeijer	15	1	16
16	(Slovenia) Tim Matavž	15	1	16
19	(Netherlands) Robin Huisman de Jong	15	0	15
19	(Belgium) Joos Valgaeren	14	1	15
21	(Burkina Faso) Rahim Ouédraogo	13	0	13
22	(Iran) Reza Ghoochannejhad	12	0	12
23	(Netherlands) Sander Danes	9	1	10
24	(Netherlands) Martijn Kamps	9	0	9
25	(Netherlands) Jeffrey Brammer	5	0	5
26	(Netherlands) Ferdy de Jonge	3	0	3
27	(Netherlands) Wesley Wakker	2	0	2
27	(Netherlands) Tim Siekman	1	1	2
29	(Netherlands) Gill Göbel	1	0	1

=== Clean sheets ===
#	Player	Eerste Divisie
1	(Denmark) Thomas Villadsen	5
2	(Netherlands) Sander Danes	1
Total		6

=== Disciplinary record ===
#	Player	Eerste Divisie		KNVB		Total	
#	Player	Yellow card	Red card	Yellow card	Red card	Yellow card	Red card
1	(Netherlands) Niek Ripson	6	1	0	0	6	1
2	(Belgium) Joos Valgaeren	4	1	0	0	4	1
2	(Netherlands) Mark Bevaart	4	1	0	0	4	1
4	(Netherlands) Ferdy de Jonge	0	1	0	0	0	1
5	(Netherlands) Sieme Zijm	7	0	0	0	7	0
6	(Netherlands) Michael van der Kruis	5	0	0	0	5	0
6	(Netherlands) Roy Stroeve	5	0	0	0	5	0
8	(Netherlands) Guus de Vries	4	0	0	0	4	0
8	(Netherlands) Jesse Schotman	4	0	0	0	4	0
10	(Netherlands) Geoffrey Verweij	3	0	0	0	3	0
11	(Netherlands) Kiran Bechan	2	0	0	0	2	0
11	(Netherlands) Marcel Pannekoek	2	0	0	0	2	0
11	(Burkina Faso) Rahim Ouédraogo	2	0	0	0	2	0
11	(Netherlands) Robin Demeijer	2	0	0	0	2	0
11	(Netherlands) Robin Huisman de Jong	2	0	0	0	2	0
16	(Netherlands) Kevin Görtz	1	0	0	0	1	0
16	(Netherlands) Martijn Kamps	1	0	0	0	1	0
16	(Belgium) Robbie Haemhouts	1	0	0	0	1	0
16	(Netherlands) Rogier Krohne	1	0	0	0	1	0
16	(Slovenia) Tim Matavž	1	0	0	0	1	0
16	(Netherlands) Tim Siekman	1	0	0	0	1	0
