= 2007–08 FC Emmen season =

Dutch football club season

FC Emmen
2007–08 season
- Stadium: De Oude Meerdijk
- Eerste Divisie: 9th
- KNVB Cup: 2nd round
- Top goalscorer: League: Roy Stroeve (12 goals); All: Morten Friis Jensen (12 goals); Roy Stroeve (12 goals)
- Biggest win: 3-0 (HFC Haarlem (h) 15th week Helmond Sport (a) 22nd week)
- Biggest defeat: 6-0 Go Ahead Eagles (a) 1st week
- All statistics correct as of 18 April 2008.

The 2007–08 season was FC Emmen's 23rd successive season in the Eerste Divisie, the second tier of Dutch football. Alongside their league campaign, Emmen participated in the KNVB Cup, where they were eliminated in the second round following a 3–1 loss to Fortuna Sittard.

FC Emmen finished ninth in the Eerste Divisie standings. Roy Stroeve and Morten Friis Jensen shared the distinction of being the club's leading goalscorers, each scoring 12 goals across all competitions. Stroeve scored all 12 of his goals in the Eerste Divisie, while Jensen registered 11 league goals and one in the KNVB Cup.

== Competitions ==
=== Overall record ===
Competition	First match	Last match	Starting round	Final position	Record							
Competition	First match	Last match	Starting round	Final position	Pld	W	D	L	GF	GA	GD	Win %
Eerste Divisie	10 August 2007	18 April 2008	Week 1	9th	38	14	11	13	61	74	−13	36.84
KNVB Cup	25 September 2007	25 September 2007	2nd round	2nd round	1	0	0	1	1	3	−2	0.00
Total					39	14	11	14	62	77	−15	35.90

Source: ESPN

=== Eerste Divisie ===
==== League table ====
Pos	Team	Pld	W	D	L	GF	GA	GD	Pts	Promotion or qualification
7	Helmond Sport	38	17	7	14	53	52	+1	58	Qualification for promotion play-offs First Round
8	TOP Oss	38	15	10	13	58	61	−3	55	Qualification for promotion play-offs First Round
9	FC Emmen	38	14	11	13	61	74	−13	53	
10	Go Ahead Eagles	38	16	3	19	60	64	−4	51	Qualification for promotion play-offs First Round
11	RBC Roosendaal	38	13	10	15	46	49	−3	49	

==== Results summary ====
Overall								Home						Away					
Pld	W	D	L	GF	GA	GD	Pts	W	D	L	GF	GA	GD	W	D	L	GF	GA	GD
38	14	11	13	61	74	−13	53	8	6	5	29	24	+5	6	5	8	32	50	−18

Last updated: 18 April 2008.
Source: https://www.espn.nl/voetbal/team/scorebord/_/id/3707/competitie/NED.2/season/2007/

==== Results by round ====
Round	1	2	3	4	5	6	7	8	9	10	11	12	13	14	15	16	17	18	19	20	21	22	23	24	25	26	27	28	29	30	31	32	33	34	35	36	37	38
Ground	A	H	H	A	H	A	H	A	A	H	A	H	H	A	H	A	A	H	A	H	H	A	H	A	A	H	A	H	H	A	H	A	H	A	A	H	A	H
Result	L	D	W	L	D	D	D	W	D	D	L	W	L	L	W	L	L	W	D	W	L	W	D	L	W	D	D	L	W	W	L	W	L	L	W	W	D	W
Position																																						9

Source: https://www.espn.nl/voetbal/team/scorebord/_/id/3707/competitie/NED.2/season/2007/ ESPN
A = Away; H = Home; W = Win; D = Draw; L = Loss

=== Matches ===
==== 1st half ====
10 August 2007 1st week	Go Ahead Eagles	6–0	FC Emmen	Deventer
20:00	Rogier Wissink 6'; Sjoerd Ars 31'; Dennis van Dijk 54' 62'; Orlando Smeekes 73' 75'	Report		Stadium: De Adelaarshorst

17 August 2007 2nd week	FC Emmen	3–3	AGOVV	Emmen
20:00	Morten Friis Jensen 31'; Sergio van Dijk 68'; Roy Stroeve 77' (pen.)	Report	Ruud ter Heide 29' (pen.); Martin Wille 55'; Koen Garritsen 83'	Stadium: Unive Stadion

24 August 2007 3rd week	FC Emmen	2–1	FC Eindhoven	Emmen
20:00	Roy Stroeve 13' 36'	Report	Tim Nelemans 68'	Stadium: Unive Stadion

27 August 2007 4th week	FC Dordrecht	2–1	FC Emmen	Dordrecht
20:00	Nick van der Velden 64' 74'	Report	Geoffrey Verweij 70'	Stadium: Stadion Krommedijk

31 August 2007 5th week	FC Emmen	1–1	MVV Maastricht	Emmen
20:00	Geoffrey Verweij 32'	Report	Gunter Thiebaut 63'	Stadium: Unive Stadion

7 September 2007 6th week	ADO Den Haag	2–2	FC Emmen	The Hague
20:00	Rick Hoogendorp 19' (pen.) 31' (pen.)	Report	Aleksandar Rankovic 9' (pen.); Jannes Wolters 52'	Stadium: Het Zuiderpark

14 September 2007 7th week	FC Emmen	0–0	Almere City FC	Emmen
20:00		Report		Stadium: Unive Stadion

17 September 2007 8th week	SC Telstar	0–1	FC Emmen	Velsen-Zuid
20:00		Report	Sergio van Dijk 58'	Stadium: Sportpark Schoonenberg

21 September 2007 9th week	FC Den Bosch	1–1	FC Emmen	's-Hertogenbosch
20:00	Koen van der Biezen 89'	Report	Sergio van Dijk 54'	Stadium: De Vliert

28 September 2007 10th week	FC Emmen	1–1	Fortuna Sittard	Emmen
20:00	Rob Haemhouts 56'	Report	Jürgen Heinrichs 80'	Stadium: Unive Stadion

5 October 2007 11th week	RKC Waalwijk	3–1	FC Emmen	Waalwijk
20:00	Luwamo Garcia 38' 50'; Martijn Reuser 90'	Report	Morten Friis Jensen 24'	Stadium: Mandemakers Stadion

12 October 2007 12th week	FC Emmen	2–1	Helmond Sport	Emmen
20:00	Morten Friis Jensen 30'; Edgar Bernhardt 49'	Report	Peter Uneken 87'	Stadium: Unive Stadion; Attendance: 3,238; Referee: Jeroen Sanders

19 October 2007 13th week	FC Emmen	0–1	PEC Zwolle	Emmen
20:00		Report	Tozé Marreco 40'	Stadium: Unive Stadion

26 October 2007 14th week	BV Veendam	3–1	FC Emmen	Veendam
20:00	Mark Veldmate 49' 56'; Erwin Buurmeijer 89'	Report	Roy Stroeve 13'	Stadium: De Langeleegte

2 November 2007 15th week	FC Emmen	3–0	HFC Haarlem	Emmen
20:00	Roy Stroeve 10' (pen.); Ronald Breinburg 52'; Morten Friis Jensen 67'	Report		Stadium: Unive Stadion

9 November 2007 16th week	FC Volendam	5–1	FC Emmen	Volendam
20:00	Paul Quasten 18'; Mathieu Boots 53'; Bernard Hofstede 74'; Jack Tuijp 78'; Rowin van Zaanen 81'	Report	Rob Haemhouts 72'	Stadium: Kras Stadion

16 November 2007 17th week	RBC Roosendaal	4–0	FC Emmen	Roosendaal
20:00	Kees Kwakman 21'; Jeffrey Vlug 43'; Saša Stojanović 45'; Sven Delanoy 53'	Report		Stadium: RBC Stadion

23 November 2007 18th week	FC Emmen	2–0	SC Cambuur	Emmen
20:00	Rob Haemhouts 21'; Sergio van Dijk 86'	Report		Stadium: Unive Stadion

30 November 2007 19th week	TOP Oss	4–4	FC Emmen	Oss
20:00	Charles Kazlauskas 12' 77'; Erik Quekel 38' 62'	Report	Geoffrey Verweij 31'; Roy Stroeve 50'; Morten Friis Jensen 73' 74'	Stadium: TOP Oss Stadion

7 December 2007 20th week	FC Emmen	3–1	Go Ahead Eagles	Emmen
20:00	Morten Friis Jensen 23' 32'; Sergio van Dijk 25'	Report	Patrick Ax 12'	Stadium: Unive Stadion

14 December 2007 21st week	FC Emmen	1–2	RKC Waalwijk	Emmen
20:00	Marcel Pannekoek 36'	Report	Fred Benson 6' 68'	Stadium: Unive Stadion

21 December 2007 22nd week	Helmond Sport	0–3	FC Emmen	Helmond
20:00		Report	Sergio van Dijk 28' 64'; Morten Friis Jensen 67'	Stadium: Stadion De Braak

==== 2nd half ====
11 January 2008 23rd week	FC Emmen	1–1	SC Telstar	Emmen
20:00	Geoffrey Meye 12' (o.g.)	Report	Geoffrey Meye 84'	Stadium: Unive Stadion

18 January 2008 24th week	Almere City FC	4–1	FC Emmen	Almere
20:00	Azor Matusiwa 9'; Patrick Mulders 49' 71'; Wamberto 57'	Report	Roy Stroeve 50'	Stadium: Yanmar Stadion

25 January 2008 25th week	HFC Haarlem	1–2	FC Emmen	Haarlem
20:00	Marvin Wijks 65'	Report	Morten Friis Jensen 60'; Roy Stroeve 90'	Stadium: Haarlem Stadion

1 February 2008 26th week	FC Emmen	2–2	FC Volendam	Emmen
20:00	Morten Friis Jensen 32'; Roy Stroeve 70'	Report	Redouan El Yaakoubi 67'; Rowin van Zaanen 78'	Stadium: Unive Stadion

8 February 2008 27th week	Fortuna Sittard	3–3	FC Emmen	Sittard
20:00	Ruud Boymans 36'; Danny Schreurs 90' 90'	Report	Roy Stroeve 73'; Bas Dost 90' 90'	Stadium: Fortuna Sittard Stadion

15 February 2008 28th week	FC Emmen	0–3	FC Den Bosch	Emmen
20:00		Report	Georgi Hristov 3' 54'; Stanley Aborah 90' 86'	Stadium: Unive Stadion

22 February 2008 29th week	FC Emmen	2–1	TOP Oss	Emmen
20:00	Martijn Kamps 53'; Geoffrey Verweij 90'	Report	Charles Kazlauskas 29'	Stadium: Unive Stadion

29 February 2008 30th week	AGOVV	4–5	FC Emmen	Apeldoorn
20:00	Christian Kabeya 27'; Ruud ter Heide 59'; Rihairo Meulens 65'; Maurice Bartelds 90'	Report	Mark Bevaart 34'; Roy Stroeve 45' 47' (pen.); Sergio van Dijk 82' 86'	Stadium: Sportpark Berg & Bos

7 March 2008 31st week	FC Emmen	1–2	RBC Roosendaal	Emmen
20:00	Marcel Pannekoek 53'	Report	Danny Guyt 89'; Iwan Redan 90'	Stadium: Unive Stadion

10 March 2008 32nd week	SC Cambuur	0–1	FC Emmen	Leeuwarden
20:00		Report	Bas Dost 77'	Stadium: Cambuur Stadion

16 March 2008 33rd week	FC Emmen	1–2	ADO Den Haag	Emmen
20:00	Marcel Pannekoek 87'	Report	Yuri Cornelisse 56'; Mimoun El Kadi 81'	Stadium: Unive Stadion

21 March 2008 34th week	MVV Maastricht	5–1	FC Emmen	Maastricht
20:00	Ole Tobiasen 3'; Gunter Thiebaut 17'; Robert van Boxel 22'; Daniel Gomez 45'; Jo Vermast 77'	Report	Sergio van Dijk 15'	Stadium: De Geusselt

28 March 2008 35th week	FC Eindhoven	2–3	FC Emmen	Eindhoven
20:00	Fabio Caracciolo 13'; Engin Güngör 45'	Report	Roy Stroeve 45'; Marcel Pannekoek 48'; Mark Bevaart 90'	Stadium: Eindhoven Stadion

4 April 2008 36th week	FC Emmen	1–0	FC Dordrecht	Emmen
20:00	Didi Longuet 12' (o.g.)	Report		Stadium: Unive Stadion

11 April 2008 37th week	PEC Zwolle	1–1	FC Emmen	Zwolle
20:00	Niklas Moisander 48'	Report	Bas Dost 26'	Stadium: Oosterenkstadion

18 April 2008 38th week	FC Emmen	3–2	BV Veendam	Emmen
20:00	Bas Dost 7' 69' 90'	Report	Maarten Woudenberg 24'; Angelo Zimmerman 33'	Stadium: Unive Stadion

=== KNVB Cup ===
25 September 2007 2nd round	Fortuna Sittard	3–1	FC Emmen	Sittard
20:00	Dirk Jan Derksen 38'; Florencio Cornelia 65'; Serdal Güvenç 90'	Report	Morten Friis Jensen 70'	Stadium: Fortuna Sittard Stadion; Attendance: 1,252; Referee: Reinold Wiedemeijer

== Statistics ==
=== Scorers ===
#	Player	Eerste Divisie	KNVB Cup	Total
1	(Denmark) Morten Friis Jensen	11	1	12
1	(Netherlands) Roy Stroeve	12	0	12
3	(Netherlands) Sergio van Dijk	10	0	10
4	(Netherlands) Bas Dost	7	0	7
5	(Netherlands) Marcel Pannekoek	5	0	5
6	(Netherlands) Geoffrey Verweij	4	0	4
7	(Belgium) Robbie Haemhouts	3	0	3
8	(Netherlands) Mark Bevaart	2	0	2
9	(Kyrgyzstan) Edgar Bernhardt	1	0	1
9	(Netherlands) Jannes Wolters	1	0	1
9	(Netherlands) Martijn Kamps	1	0	1
9	(Netherlands) Ronald Breinburg	1	0	1
