= List of FC Emmen seasons =

This is a list of the seasons played by FC Emmen from 1985.

== Summary of FC Emmen seasons ==
=== 1980s ===
FC Emmen entered professional football in the 1985–86 Eerste Divisie after previously competing in the Dutch amateur leagues. Under manager Theo Verlangen, the club finished 18th in its inaugural professional season. FC Emmen continued to struggle during its early years, finishing 16th in 1986–87 and 18th in both 1987–88 and 1988–89. The club's fortunes improved in 1989–90, when they finished sixth and qualified for the promotion competition after winning a period title. However, FC Emmen narrowly missed out on promotion to the Eredivisie.

=== 1990s ===
FC Emmen remained in the Eerste Divisie throughout the 1990s, experiencing a period of significant improvement during the second half of the decade. After several mid-table and lower-table finishes, the club achieved second place in 1995–96, followed by three consecutive third-place finishes from 1996–97 to 1998–99. Despite repeatedly qualifying for the promotion play-offs, FC Emmen failed to secure promotion to the Eredivisie. The club finished fifth in 1999–2000, completing a run of five consecutive seasons among the league's top five teams.

=== 2000s ===
FC Emmen continued to compete in the Eerste Divisie throughout the 2000s. The club finished fifth in 2001–02 before achieving second place in 2002–03, one of its strongest league performances since entering professional football. Donny de Groot scored 30 league goals that season, although FC Emmen once again failed to gain promotion through the play-offs. Financial difficulties affected the club during the decade, while results became increasingly inconsistent. After finishing 19th in 2004–05, FC Emmen recovered to sixth place in 2005–06 but subsequently returned to mid-table and lower-table positions. The club concluded the decade with a 15th-place finish in 2009–10.

=== 2010s ===
FC Emmen spent the majority of the 2010s in the Eerste Divisie before securing its first promotion to the Eredivisie. Following several seasons in the lower half of the standings, the club finished fourth in 2014–15 and qualified for the promotion play-offs. Under manager Dick Lukkien, FC Emmen finished seventh in 2017–18 and entered the play-offs, where they eliminated NEC Nijmegen before facing Sparta Rotterdam in the final. After a goalless draw in the first leg, FC Emmen won 3–1 in Rotterdam on 20 May 2018, earning promotion to the Eredivisie for the first time in the club's history. In their inaugural 2018–19 Eredivisie season, FC Emmen finished 14th and retained their top-flight status. The club followed this with a 12th-place finish in 2019–20.

=== 2020s ===
FC Emmen began the decade in the Eredivisie but finished 16th in the 2020–21 Eredivisie, resulting in relegation after defeat in the promotion/relegation play-offs. The club immediately returned to the top flight by winning the 2021–22 Eerste Divisie championship, securing its first professional league title. However, FC Emmen's return to the Eredivisie lasted only one season, as another 16th-place finish in 2022–23 was followed by relegation through the play-offs. Back in the Eerste Divisie, the club finished seventh in 2023–24 and qualified for the promotion play-offs but failed to return to the top division. FC Emmen subsequently finished eighth in 2024–25 and 14th in 2025–26, remaining in the second tier.

== Seasons ==
Key to KNVB Cup rounds:

- 2R – Second round
- 3R – Third round
- GS – Group stage
- QF – Quarter-final
- R16 – 1/8 Final (round of 16)
- R32 – 1/16 Final (round of 32)
- SF – Semi-final

Seasons of VVV-Venlo
#	Season	League					KNVB Cup	Top scorer(s)	
#	Season	Division	Total	Consecutive	Pts	Pos	KNVB Cup	Player(s)	Goals
1	1985–86	Eerste Divisie	1st	1st	24	18th	—	—	—
2	1986–87	Eerste Divisie	2nd	2nd	26	16th	—	—	—
3	1987–88	Eerste Divisie	3rd	3rd	22	18th	—	—	—
4	1988–89	Eerste Divisie	4th	4th	20	18th	—	—	—
5	1989–90	Eerste Divisie	5th	5th	38	6th	—	—	—
6	1990–91	Eerste Divisie	6th	6th	36	12th	—	—	—
7	1991–92	Eerste Divisie	7th	7th	29	18th	—	—	—
8	1992–93	Eerste Divisie	8th	8th	27	12th	—	—	—
9	1993–94	Eerste Divisie	9th	9th	36	9th	—	—	—
10	1994–95	Eerste Divisie	10th	10th	35	10th	—	—	—
11	1995–96	Eerste Divisie	11th	11th	67	2nd	—	—	—
12	1996–97	Eerste Divisie	12th	12th	63	3rd	—	—	—
13	1997–98	Eerste Divisie	13th	13th	61	3rd	—	—	—
14	1998–99	Eerste Divisie	14th	14th	61	3rd	—	—	—
15	1999–2000	Eerste Divisie	15th	15th	58	5th	—	—	—
16	2000–01	Eerste Divisie	16th	16th	41	11th	—	—	—
17	2001–02	Eerste Divisie	17th	17th	59	5th	—	—	—
18	2002–03	Eerste Divisie	18th	18th	75	2nd	—	—	—
19	2003–04	Eerste Divisie	19th	19th	61	8th	—	—	—
20	2004–05	Eerste Divisie	20th	20th	30	18th	—	—	—
21	2005–06	Eerste Divisie	21st	21st	60	6th	—	—	—
22	2006–07	Eerste Divisie	22nd	22nd	48	11th	3R	(Indonesia) Sergio van Dijk	12
23	2007–08	Eerste Divisie	23rd	23rd	53	9th	2R	(Denmark) Morten Friis Jensen (Netherlands) Roy Stroeve	12
24	2008–09	Eerste Divisie	24th	24th	47	13th	2R	(Netherlands) Roy Stroeve	13
25	2009–10	Eerste Divisie	25th	25th	38	15th	3R	(Netherlands) Hans Denissen	13
26	2010–11	Eerste Divisie	26th	26th	35	13th	—	—	—
27	2011–12	Eerste Divisie	27th	27th	17	18th	—	—	—
28	2012–13	Eerste Divisie	28th	28th	32	12th	—	—	—
29	2013–14	Eerste Divisie	29th	29th	51	12th	—	—	—
30	2014–15	Eerste Divisie	30th	30th	67	4th	—	—	—
31	2015–16	Eerste Divisie	31st	31st	51	7th	—	—	—
32	2016–17	Eerste Divisie	32nd	32nd	55	9th	—	—	—
33	2017–18	Eerste Divisie	33rd	33rd	58	7th (Note: Promoted to Eredivisie via play-offs.)	—	—	—
34	2018–19	Eredivisie	1st	1st	38	14th	—	—	—
35	2019–20	Eredivisie	2nd	2nd	32	12th	—	—	—
36	2020–21	Eredivisie	3rd	3rd	30	16th (Note: Relegated to Eerste Divisie via play-offs.)	—	—	—
37	2021–22	Eerste Divisie	34th	1st	83	1st (Note: Promoted to Eredivisie.)	—	—	—
38	2022–23	Eredivisie	4th	1st	28	16th	—	—	—
39	2023–24	Eerste Divisie	35th	1st	57	7th	—	—	—
40	2024–25	Eerste Divisie	36th	2nd	56	8th	—	—	—
41	2025–26	Eerste Divisie	37th	3rd	45	14th	—	—	—
42	2026–27	Eerste Divisie	38th	4th	—	—	—	—	—
