= 2007–08 FC Volendam season =

Dutch football club season

FC Volendam
2007–08 season
- Manager: Stanley Menzo
- Stadium: Kras Stadion
- Eerste Divisie: 1st (promoted)
- KNVB Cup: Second round
- Top goalscorer: League: Jack Tuijp (26); All: Jack Tuijp (26)
- Biggest win: Volendam 5–1 Go Ahead Eagles; Eindhoven 2–6 Volendam

During the 2007–08 season, FC Volendam won the Eerste Divisie title and was subsequently promoted to the top division. The team also competed in the KNVB Cup.

== Competitions ==
=== Overall record ===
Competition	First match	Last match	Starting round	Final position	Record							
Competition	First match	Last match	Starting round	Final position	Pld	W	D	L	GF	GA	GD	Win %
Eerste Divisie	10 August 2007	18 April 2008	Matchday 1	Winners	38	22	11	5	90	46	+44	57.89
KNVB Cup	25 September 2007		Second round	Second round	1	0	1	0	3	3	+0	0.00
Total					39	22	12	5	93	49	+44	56.41

Source: Competitions

=== Eerste Divisie ===
==== Table ====
Pos	Team	Pld	W	D	L	GF	GA	GD	Pts	Promotion or qualification
1	FC Volendam (C, P)	38	22	11	5	90	46	+44	77	Promotion to the Eredivisie
2	RKC Waalwijk	38	22	11	5	84	44	+40	77	Qualification for promotion play-offs Second Round
3	FC Den Bosch	38	21	7	10	61	37	+24	70	Qualification for promotion play-offs Second Round
4	FC Zwolle	38	18	13	7	70	42	+28	67	Qualification for promotion play-offs Second Round
5	MVV	38	16	12	10	66	50	+16	60	Qualification for promotion play-offs Second Round

(C) Champions; (P) Promoted

==== Results summary ====
Overall								Home						Away					
Pld	W	D	L	GF	GA	GD	Pts	W	D	L	GF	GA	GD	W	D	L	GF	GA	GD
38	22	11	5	90	46	+44	77	12	5	2	50	18	+32	10	6	3	40	28	+12

Source: Worldfootball

==== Results by round ====
Round	1	2	3	4	5	6	7	8	9	10	11	12	13	14	15	16	17	18	19	20	21	22	23	24	25	26	27	28	29	30	31	32	33	34	35	36	37	38
Ground	H	A	H	H	A	A	H	A	H	A	A	H	A	H	A	H	A	H	H	A	H	A	H	A	H	A	H	A	A	H	H	A	H	H	A	A	H	A
Result	D	W	D	L	W	L	W	W	W	L	L	W	D	D	W	W	D	D	D	D	W	D	W	W	W	D	W	D	W	L	W	W	W	W	W	W	W	W
Position	6	4	5	7	5	10	5	3	3	4	5	4	6	6	6	5	5	6	6	6	6	6	5	3	2	2	2	3	3	3	3	2	2	1	1	1	1	1

Source: Worldfootball
A = Away; H = Home; B = Annulled; W = Win; D = Draw; L = Loss

==== Matches ====
10 August 2007 1	Volendam	2–2	BV Veendam	Volendam
	Plat 12'; Van Zaanen 32'		Buurmeijer 69', 71'	Stadium: Kras Stadion; Attendance: 2,311; Referee: Raymond van Meenen

17 August 2007 2	Fortuna Sittard	0–1	Volendam	Sittard
			Van Zaanen 19'	Stadium: Fortuna Sittard Stadion; Attendance: 6,428; Referee: Hessel Steegstra

24 August 2007 3	Volendam	2–2	FC Zwolle	Volendam
	Tuijp 18', 27'		Verhoeven 12' (o.g.); Botteghin 43'	Stadium: Kras Stadion; Attendance: 2,437; Referee: Danny Makkelie

27 August 2007 4	Volendam	1–2	AGOVV	Volendam
				Stadium: Kras Stadion

31 August 2007 5	TOP Oss	0–2	Volendam	Oss
				Stadium: Frans Heesen Stadion

7 September 2007 6	SC Cambuur	2–1	Volendam	Leeuwarden
				Stadium: Cambuur Stadion

14 September 2007 7	Volendam	5–1	Go Ahead Eagles	Volendam
				Stadium: Kras Stadion

17 September 2007 8	FC Eindhoven	2–6	Volendam	Eindhoven
				Stadium: Jan Louwers Stadion

21 September 2007 9	Volendam	1–0	HFC Haarlem	Volendam
				Stadium: Kras Stadion

28 September 2007 10	MVV Maastricht	2–0	Volendam	Maastricht
				Stadium: De Geusselt

5 October 2007 11	Helmond Sport	2–1	Volendam	Helmond
				Stadium: GS Staalwerken Stadion

12 October 2007 12	Volendam	4–1	Den Bosch	Volendam
				Stadium: Kras Stadion

19 October 2007 13	Dordrecht	1–1	Volendam	Dordrecht
	Kalisse 44'		Chaiat 43'	Stadium: Stadion Krommedijk; Attendance: 2,650; Referee: Pol van Boekel

28 October 2007 14	Volendam	2–2	ADO Den Haag	Volendam
	Tuijp 63'; Van Zaanen 70'		Ranković 58'; Schilder 76' (o.g.)	Stadium: Kras Stadion; Attendance: 3,191; Referee: Ed Janssen

2 November 2007 15	Stormvogels Telstar	2–3	Volendam	Velsen-Zuid
				Stadium: Sportpark Schoonenberg

9 November 2007 16	Volendam	5–1	Emmen	Volendam
				Stadium: Kras Stadion

16 November 2007 18	FC Omniworld	1–1	Volendam	Almere
	Duits 79'		Chaiat 67'	Stadium: Mitsubishi Forkliftstadion; Attendance: 1,845; Referee: Mike van der Roest

23 November 2007 18	Volendam	1–1	RBC Roosendaal	Volendam
				Stadium: Kras Stadion

30 November 2007 19	Volendam	1–1	RKC Waalwijk	Volendam
	Chaiat 35'		Di Gregorio 61'	Stadium: Kras Stadion; Attendance: 2,813; Referee: Björn Kuipers

7 December 2007 20	BV Veendam	3–3	Volendam	Veendam

14 December 2007 21	Volendam	4–0	Helmond Sport	Volendam
				Stadium: Kras Stadion

11 January 2008 23	Volendam	6–2	FC Eindhoven	Volendam
				Stadium: Kras Stadion

18 January 2008 24	Go Ahead Eagles	1–2	Volendam	Deventer

23 January 2008 22	Den Bosch	1–1	Volendam	's-Hertogenbosch
				Stadium: De Vliert

27 January 2008 25	Volendam	2–0	Stormvogels Telstar	Volendam
				Stadium: Kras Stadion

1 February 2008 26	Emmen	2–2	Volendam	Emmen
				Stadium: De Oude Meerdijk

8 February 2008 27	Volendam	1–0	MVV Maastricht	Volendam
				Stadium: Kras Stadion

17 February 2008 28	HFC Haarlem	2–2	Volendam	Haarlem
	Kruijer 11'; Ketting 53'		Tuijp 62'; Van Zaanen 79'	Stadium: Haarlem Stadion; Attendance: 2,010; Referee: Tom van Sichem

22 February 2008 29	RKC Waalwijk	2–3	Volendam	Waalwijk
				Stadium: Mandemakers Stadion

29 February 2008 30	Volendam	2–3	Fortuna Sittard	Volendam
				Stadium: Kras Stadion

7 March 2008 31	Volendam	3–0	FC Omniworld	Volendam
				Stadium: Kras Stadion

10 March 2008 32	RBC Roosendaal	1–2	Volendam	Roosendaal
	Kerstens 45'		Valenta 19'; Deul 72'	Stadium: RBC Stadion; Attendance: 2,450; Referee: Dick Jol

14 March 2008 33	Volendam	3–0	SC Cambuur	Volendam
				Stadium: Kras Stadion

21 March 2008 34	Volendam	3–0	TOP Oss	Volendam
				Stadium: Kras Stadion

28 March 2008 35	Zwolle	1–2	Volendam	Zwolle
				Stadium: FC Zwolle Stadion

4 April 2008 36	AGOVV	3–6	Volendam	Apeldoorn
				Stadium: Sportpark Berg & Bos; Attendance: 3,021; Referee: Danny Makkelie

11 April 2008 37	Volendam	2–0	FC Dordrecht	Volendam
	Chaiat 64'; Hofstede 77'			Stadium: Kras Stadion; Attendance: 5,568; Referee: Pieter Vink

18 April 2008 38	ADO Den Haag	0–1	Volendam	The Hague
			Tuijp 26'	Stadium: ADO Den Haag Stadion; Attendance: 11,358; Referee: Bas Nijhuis

=== KVNB Cup ===
25 September 2007 Second round	Volendam	3–3 (a.e.t.) (2–4 p)	Sparta Rotterdam	Volendam
				Stadium: Kras Stadion
