= Appie =

Appie is a masculine given name or nickname which may refer to:

- John S. Apperson (1878–1963), American engineer and environmentalist
- A. C. Baantjer (1923–2010), Dutch author of detective fiction and police officer
- Abraham Bueno de Mesquita (1918–2005), Dutch comedian and actor
- Abdelhali Chaiat (born 1983), Moroccan footballer
- Appie Corman, a Dutch competitor in boxing at the 1948 Summer Olympics – Men's flyweight class
- Appie de Gelder, guitarist of the Dutch heavy metal band Picture (band)
- Abdelhak Nouri (born 1997), Dutch footballer
- Appie Rammers, a member of the 1960s Dutch band The Outsiders (Dutch band)
- Appie Steenbeek, a Dutch competitor in the 1985 Mr. Olympia contest
- Appie Tayibi, one of the main characters in the Belgian-Dutch television series Het Huis Anubis
- Appie, a nickname for the supermarket chain Albert Heijn
