= Meye =

Meye is a surname. Notable people with this surname include:

- Axel Méyé (born 1995), Gabonese football player
- François Meye, Gabonese politician
- Geoffrey Meye (born 1982), Dutch football player
- John Meye, also spelled May, (died 1598), English academic and churchman
- Kurt Meye, German football player
- Roguy Méyé (born 1986), Gabonese football player
