= 2012–13 FC Emmen season =

Dutch football club season

FC Emmen
2012–13 season
- Stadium: Unive Stadion
- Eerste Divisie: 12th
- KNVB Cup: 3rd round
- All statistics correct as of 3 May 2013.

The 2012–13 season was FC Emmen's 28th successive season in the Eerste Divisie.

== Transfers ==
=== Eerste Divisie ===
==== Results by round ====
Round	1	2	3	4	5	6	7	8	9	10	11	12	13	14	15	16	17	18	19	20	21	22	23	24	25	26	27	28	29	30	31	32	33	34
Ground	H	A	A	H	A																													
Result	D	L	L	D	D																													
Position																																		12

Source: https://www.espn.nl/voetbal/team/scorebord/_/id/3707/competitie/NED.2/season/2011/ ESPN
A = Away; H = Home; W = Win; D = Draw; L = Loss

=== Matches ===
==== 1st half ====
10 August 2012 18th week	FC Emmen	1–1	FC Dordrecht	Emmen
20:00	Kelvin Maynard 90+2'	Report	Adnan Alisic 68'	Stadium: Unive Stadion

17 August 2012 2nd week	FC Emmen	2–0	Excelsior Rotterdam	Rotterdam
20:00	Mick van Buren 11' (pen.) 38'	Report		Stadium: Stadion Woudestein; Attendance: 1,566

24 August 2012 3rd week	Fortuna Sittard	3–1	FC Emmen	Sittard
20:00	Aziz Khalouta 43'; Kevin Diaz 57'; Patrick Nkoyi 87'	Report	Anmar Almubaraki 6'	Stadium: Trendwork Arena

31 August 2012 4th week	FC Emmen	0–0	Sparta Rotterdam	Emmen
20:00		Report		Stadium: Unive Stadion; Attendance: 1,923

17 September 2012 5th week	SC Telstar	0–0	FC Emmen	Velsen-Zuid
20:00		Report		Stadium: TATA Steel Stadion
