= John Apperson =

John Apperson may refer to:

- John S. Apperson (1882–1963), General Electric engineer
- John T. Apperson (1834–1917), American steamboat captain, military officer and politician
