= Mimoun =

Mimoun, Mimun or MIMUN may refer to

- Mimoun (name)
- Mimoun (singer)
- Moscow International Model United Nations (MIMUN) in Russia
- Ath Aissa Mimoun, a commune in Algeria
- Ouled Mimoun, a town and commune in Algeria
- Ouled Mimoun District in Algeria
- Stade Mimoun Al Arsi, a stadium in Morocco
