= 2008–09 Eerste Divisie =

53rd season of the second-tier football league in Netherlands

Eerste Divisie
- Season: 2008–09
- Champions: VVV-Venlo
- Promoted: VVV-Venlo; RKC Waalwijk

Location of teams in the Eerste Divisie 2008-09

Eerste Divisie 2008–09 began in August 2008 and concluded in May 2009, with the promotion playoffs. Sixteen clubs remained in the Eerste Divisie, whilst Excelsior and VVV-Venlo were relegated from the 2007–08 Eredivisie. VVV-Venlo won the league title and were promoted to the Eredivisie, the highest tier of football in the Netherlands, while eight other teams competed in a playoff with two Eredivisie sides for two Eredivisie places.

== Standings ==
| Pos | Team | Pld | W | D | L | GF | GA | GD | Pts | Promotion or qualification |
|---|---|---|---|---|---|---|---|---|---|---|
| 1 | VVV-Venlo (C, P) | 38 | 25 | 5 | 8 | 86 | 38 | +48 | 80 | Promotion to the Eredivisie |
| 2 | RKC Waalwijk (P) | 38 | 18 | 17 | 3 | 68 | 31 | +37 | 71 | Qualification for promotion play-offs Second Round |
| 3 | Cambuur | 38 | 20 | 9 | 9 | 68 | 49 | +19 | 69 | Qualification for promotion play-offs Second Round |
| 4 | Zwolle | 38 | 18 | 9 | 11 | 58 | 49 | +9 | 63 | Qualification for promotion play-offs Second Round |
| 5 | Excelsior | 38 | 16 | 13 | 9 | 53 | 43 | +10 | 61 | Qualification for promotion play-offs Second Round |
| 6 | MVV | 38 | 16 | 12 | 10 | 60 | 42 | +18 | 60 | Qualification for promotion play-offs First Round |
| 7 | Go Ahead Eagles | 38 | 14 | 14 | 10 | 41 | 41 | 0 | 56 | |
| 8 | Dordrecht | 38 | 15 | 10 | 13 | 51 | 39 | +12 | 55 | Qualification for promotion play-offs First Round |
| 9 | Den Bosch | 38 | 15 | 8 | 15 | 59 | 51 | +8 | 53 | |
| 10 | Helmond Sport | 38 | 14 | 11 | 13 | 50 | 48 | +2 | 53 | |
| 11 | AGOVV | 38 | 15 | 7 | 16 | 60 | 67 | −7 | 52 | |
| 12 | Haarlem | 38 | 15 | 5 | 18 | 43 | 56 | −13 | 50 | |
| 13 | Emmen | 38 | 13 | 8 | 17 | 48 | 68 | −20 | 47 | |
| 14 | Oss | 38 | 11 | 9 | 18 | 50 | 63 | −13 | 42 | Qualification for promotion play-offs First Round |
| 15 | Fortuna Sittard | 38 | 11 | 9 | 18 | 42 | 59 | −17 | 42 | |
| 16 | RBC Roosendaal | 38 | 11 | 7 | 20 | 43 | 55 | −12 | 40 | |
| 17 | Telstar | 38 | 9 | 12 | 17 | 42 | 56 | −14 | 39 | Qualification for promotion play-offs First Round |
| 18 | Eindhoven | 38 | 9 | 14 | 15 | 59 | 80 | −21 | 38 (Note: 3 points deducted) | |
| 19 | Veendam | 38 | 10 | 9 | 19 | 46 | 67 | −21 | 36 | |
| 20 | Omniworld | 38 | 8 | 6 | 24 | 40 | 65 | −25 | 30 | |

Rules for classification: 1) points; 2) goal difference; 3) number of goals scored.
(C) Champions; (P) Promoted

=== Period winners ===
The competition is divided into six periods (Dutch: periode) of six matches each. The winner of each period (Dutch: periodekampioen) qualifies for the playoffs at the end of the season. If the winner of a period has already won a prior period in the season, the second placed team in the period is awarded the playoff slot. If the second placed team has also won a prior period, no winner is called, and the playoff slot is decided by league standing at the end of the season.

=== Best Top Ranking Teams ===
Excelsior, Telstar, FC Zwolle, TOP Oss and Dordrecht were awarded play-off spot as their performance in the six periods, along with RKC Waalwijk and Cambuur, the two best placed team in Eerste Divisie who did not get a play-off spot via period route. As VVV-Venlo, one of the period winners, promoted as Eerste Divisie champions, MVV replaced them as the best placed team who did not qualify for play-off.

Period winners (Periodekampioenen)
| Period | Winning team | Pld | W | D | L | GF | GA | GD | Pts |
|---|---|---|---|---|---|---|---|---|---|
| 1 | Excelsior | 6 | 5 | 0 | 1 | 12 | 4 | +8 | 15 |
| 2 | VVV-Venlo | 6 | 6 | 0 | 0 | 17 | 3 | +14 | 18 |
| 3 | Telstar | 6 | 4 | 1 | 1 | 13 | 7 | +6 | 13 |
| 4 | FC Zwolle | 6 | 5 | 0 | 1 | 13 | 11 | +2 | 15 |
| 5 | TOP Oss | 6 | 4 | 1 | 1 | 13 | 7 | +6 | 13 |
| 6 | Dordrecht | 6 | 6 | 0 | 0 | 15 | 3 | +12 | 18 |

== Results ==
| Home \ Away | AGO | CAM | DBO | DOR | EIN | EMM | EXC | FOR | GAE | HAA | HEL | MVV | OMN | RBC | RKC | TEL | OSS | VEE | VVV | ZWO |
|---|---|---|---|---|---|---|---|---|---|---|---|---|---|---|---|---|---|---|---|---|
| AGOVV | | 0–2 | 3–2 | 1–0 | 3–1 | 1–1 | 2–3 | 1–0 | 1–5 | 2–0 | 1–0 | 2–3 | 2–2 | 2–0 | 2–2 | 1–1 | 3–2 | 4–1 | 2–1 | 2–1 |
| Cambuur | 2–2 | | 0–3 | 2–0 | 3–1 | 6–2 | 1–1 | 2–1 | 2–2 | 3–2 | 2–0 | 2–1 | 2–0 | 2–1 | 1–1 | 2–3 | 2–1 | 2–2 | 2–0 | 1–2 |
| Den Bosch | 2–0 | 1–2 | | 1–2 | 0–2 | 5–0 | 0–0 | 1–1 | 1–0 | 0–2 | 1–1 | 1–3 | 3–1 | 2–1 | 1–1 | 3–0 | 2–1 | 2–2 | 0–5 | 3–4 |
| Dordrecht | 2–1 | 1–0 | 0–1 | | 2–0 | 1–0 | 0–1 | 3–0 | 3–1 | 4–0 | 1–0 | 1–1 | 2–1 | 1–1 | 0–1 | 1–1 | 2–0 | 2–3 | 0–2 | 4–0 |
| Eindhoven | 3–3 | 3–3 | 1–7 | 2–1 | | 2–2 | 1–0 | 2–4 | 1–1 | 3–2 | 1–1 | 1–1 | 1–1 | 0–1 | 1–1 | 1–4 | 2–2 | 2–1 | 1–3 | 2–0 |
| Emmen | 2–3 | 3–2 | 0–1 | 2–1 | 1–4 | | 0–2 | 1–2 | 2–2 | 2–0 | 1–1 | 1–1 | 2–1 | 1–0 | 2–1 | 0–2 | 4–4 | 3–2 | 2–4 | 1–0 |
| Excelsior | 4–0 | 0–0 | 2–1 | 1–1 | 3–2 | 0–2 | | 5–1 | 3–0 | 1–1 | 1–0 | 1–1 | 2–1 | 1–0 | 0–5 | 0–1 | 2–1 | 4–1 | 1–2 | 0–2 |
| Fortuna Sittard | 2–4 | 1–4 | 1–0 | 0–0 | 2–1 | 1–2 | 1–1 | | 0–1 | 1–2 | 3–1 | 3–2 | 2–0 | 0–0 | 2–1 | 2–1 | 1–1 | 1–2 | 0–1 | 1–3 |
| Go Ahead Eagles | 2–0 | 2–0 | 0–0 | 0–0 | 2–2 | 0–1 | 1–1 | 1–1 | | 1–2 | 1–0 | 0–0 | 1–0 | 1–0 | 0–0 | 2–2 | 1–0 | 2–1 | 1–0 | 0–1 |
| Haarlem | 1–0 | 0–1 | 1–4 | 3–0 | 2–1 | 0–1 | 2–1 | 2–0 | 1–2 | | 1–3 | 0–3 | 2–1 | 2–0 | 0–2 | 4–2 | 2–1 | 1–0 | 0–4 | 3–1 |
| Helmond Sport | 1–2 | 4–1 | 3–0 | 1–0 | 4–3 | 3–1 | 1–1 | 2–2 | 1–1 | 1–1 | | 2–1 | 1–0 | 0–1 | 1–2 | 1–1 | 3–0 | 1–3 | 3–2 | 0–0 |
| MVV | 3–1 | 1–2 | 1–0 | 2–2 | 3–1 | 1–1 | 0–1 | 0–2 | 1–1 | 3–0 | 3–1 | | 2–1 | 4–1 | 2–1 | 2–0 | 1–1 | 1–2 | 2–0 | 4–1 |
| Omniworld | 0–3 | 1–0 | 1–2 | 2–1 | 2–0 | 1–0 | 1–1 | 4–1 | 1–2 | 0–1 | 0–1 | 1–2 | | 1–2 | 1–1 | 1–0 | 0–2 | 2–1 | 3–5 | 3–3 |
| RBC Roosendaal | 3–0 | 1–2 | 0–1 | 2–3 | 1–2 | 2–1 | 1–2 | 0–1 | 0–1 | 2–0 | 1–1 | 1–1 | 1–1 | | 2–2 | 1–0 | 3–2 | 2–1 | 1–4 | 1–3 |
| RKC Waalwijk | 3–1 | 1–1 | 1–1 | 3–3 | 2–2 | 1–0 | 1–1 | 2–0 | 1–1 | 1–1 | 3–0 | 2–0 | 1–0 | 3–1 | | 3–0 | 5–0 | 4–1 | 1–1 | 1–0 |
| Telstar | 1–0 | 1–1 | 2–2 | 0–1 | 1–1 | 0–2 | 1–1 | 1–1 | 4–1 | 0–0 | 2–3 | 1–2 | 3–1 | 1–1 | 1–2 | | 2–2 | 1–0 | 2–1 | 0–2 |
| Oss | 1–1 | 0–2 | 2–1 | 0–0 | 1–2 | 2–1 | 3–1 | 1–0 | 0–2 | 1–0 | 1–2 | 1–0 | 3–0 | 0–3 | 0–3 | 3–0 | | 2–3 | 4–2 | 3–1 |
| Veendam | 2–1 | 0–3 | 2–4 | 0–4 | 2–2 | 1–1 | 1–2 | 0–0 | 2–0 | 0–0 | 1–1 | 1–0 | 0–2 | 3–2 | 0–2 | 1–0 | 1–1 | | 1–2 | 0–0 |
| VVV-Venlo | 3–1 | 1–2 | 2–0 | 1–1 | 6–0 | 4–0 | 3–1 | 2–0 | 5–0 | 1–0 | 2–0 | 2–2 | 4–1 | 3–1 | 0–0 | 1–0 | 3–1 | 1–0 | | 1–1 |
| Zwolle | 3–2 | 3–1 | 1–0 | 2–1 | 2–2 | 4–0 | 1–1 | 2–1 | 1–0 | 3–2 | 0–1 | 0–0 | 3–1 | 0–2 | 1–1 | 3–0 | 0–0 | 3–2 | 1–2 | |

Source: www.nos.nl
Legend: Blue = home team win; Yellow = draw; Red = away team win.

== Top scorers ==
| Goals | Player | Team |
|---|---|---|
| 25 | (Netherlands) Sandro Calabro | VVV-Venlo |
| 20 | (Belgium) Gunther Thiebaut | MVV |
| 18 | (Netherlands) Serhat Koç | FC Eindhoven |
| 18 | (Netherlands) Glynor Plet | Telstar |
| 17 | (Netherlands) Sjoerd Ars | RBC Roosendaal |
| 16 | (Japan) Keisuke Honda | VVV-Venlo |
| 14 | (Netherlands) Jeremy Bokila | AGOVV Apeldoorn |
| 14 | (Netherlands) Ruud ter Heide | SC Cambuur |
| 13 | (Netherlands) Marc Höcher | Helmond Sport |
| 13 | (Belgium) Dries Mertens | AGOVV Apeldoorn |
| 13 | (Netherlands) Fred Benson | RKC Waalwijk |
| 13 | (Netherlands) Roy Stroeve | FC Emmen |
| 13 | (Netherlands) Adnan Barakat | FC Den Bosch |
| 13 | (Netherlands) Koen van der Biezen | Go Ahead Eagles / FC Den Bosch |
| 12 | (Netherlands) Samir El Gaaouiri | VVV-Venlo |
| 12 | (Netherlands) Karim Fachtali | TOP Oss |
| 12 | (Netherlands) Ruud Berger | RKC Waalwijk |
| 12 | (Cape Verde) Cecilio Lopes | FC Dordrecht |

== Playoffs ==
Please note that the following teams: Roda JC & De Graafschap joined the Eerste Divisie-teams for the playoffs, after finishing 16th and 17th in the Eredivisie.

=== Round 1 ===
| Team 1 | Agg. | Team 2 | 1st leg | 2nd leg |
|---|---|---|---|---|
| Telstar | 0–1 | MVV | 0–0 | 0–1 |
| TOP Oss | 0–3 | Dordrecht | 0–2 | 0–1 |

=== Round 2 (best of 3) ===
| Team 1 | Pts | Team 2 | 1st leg | 2nd leg | 3rd leg |
|---|---|---|---|---|---|
| MVV | 4–5 | De Graafschap | 2–3 | 2–2 | not played |
| Excelsior | 2–3 | RKC Waalwijk | 1–2 | 1–1 | not played |
| FC Zwolle | 3–6 | Cambuur | 2–1 | 1–3 | 0-2 |
| Dordrecht | 1–2 | Roda JC | 1–1 | 0–1 | not played |

=== Round 3 (best of 3) ===
| Team 1 | Pts | Team 2 | 1st leg | 2nd leg | 3rd leg |
|---|---|---|---|---|---|
| RKC Waalwijk | 4–2 | De Graafschap | 2–0 | 1–2 | 1–0 |
| Cambuur | 3–3 (p. 1–3) | Roda JC | 0–0 | 1–1 | 2–2 (aet) |

The 2 winners of Round 3 will play in Eredivisie 2009–10.

== Overview ==
| Club | Location | Current manager | 2008–09 season managers |
|---|---|---|---|
| AGOVV Apeldoorn | Apeldoorn | (Netherlands) John van den Brom | |
| SC Cambuur | Leeuwarden | (Netherlands) Stanley Menzo | (Netherlands) Jurrie Koolhof |
| FC Den Bosch | 's-Hertogenbosch | Vacant | (Netherlands) Theo Bos |
| FC Dordrecht | Dordrecht | (Netherlands) Gert Kruys | |
| FC Eindhoven | Eindhoven | (Belgium) Marc Brys | |
| FC Emmen | Emmen | (Netherlands) Paul Krabbe | (Netherlands) Gerry Hamstra |
| Excelsior | Rotterdam | (Netherlands) Ton Lokhoff | |
| Fortuna Sittard | Sittard | (Netherlands) Roger Reijners | |
| Go Ahead Eagles | Deventer | (Netherlands) Andries Ulderink | |
| HFC Haarlem | Haarlem | (Netherlands) Jan Zoutman | |
| Helmond Sport | Helmond | (Netherlands) Jurgen Streppel | |
| MVV | Maastricht | (Turkey) Fuat Çapa | |
| FC Omniworld | Almere | (Netherlands) Henk Wisman | (Netherlands) Peter Boeve |
| RBC Roosendaal | Roosendaal | (Netherlands) Rini Coolen | (Netherlands) Rob Meppelink |
| RKC Waalwijk | Waalwijk | (Netherlands) Ruud Brood | |
| Telstar | Velsen | (Netherlands) Edward Metgod | |
| TOP Oss | Oss | (Netherlands) Hans de Koning | |
| BV Veendam | Veendam | (Netherlands) Joop Gall | |
| VVV-Venlo | Venlo | (Netherlands) Jan van Dijk | |
| FC Zwolle | Zwolle | (Netherlands) Marco Roelofsen | (Netherlands) Jan Everse |

== Attendances ==
| # | Club | Average |
|---|---|---|
| 1 | Cambuur | 7,887 |
| 2 | VVV | 6,035 |
| 3 | MVV | 5,903 |
| 4 | Zwolle | 5,290 |
| 5 | Go Ahead | 4,180 |
| 6 | Den Bosch | 4,150 |
| 7 | RKC | 3,949 |
| 8 | Helmond | 3,214 |
| 9 | Veendam | 3,076 |
| 10 | Fortuna | 3,042 |
| 11 | Emmen | 3,027 |
| 12 | RBC | 2,731 |
| 13 | Dordrecht | 2,390 |
| 14 | AGOVV | 2,377 |
| 15 | Oss | 2,120 |
| 16 | Excelsior | 2,096 |
| 17 | Haarlem | 1,927 |
| 18 | Eindhoven | 1,712 |
| 19 | Omniworld | 1,381 |
| 20 | Telstar | 1,251 |

== See also ==
- 2008–09 Eredivisie
- 2008–09 KNVB Cup
