= Meppelink =

Meppelink is a Dutch surname. Notable people with the surname include:

- Madelein Meppelink (born 1989), Dutch beach volleyball player
- Rob Meppelink (born 1966), Dutch footballer and manager
