= Mimoun (name) =

Mimoun or Mimun may refer to the following people

Given name

- Mimoun (singer) (born 1938), Tunisian singer
- Mimoun Azaouagh (born 1982), Moroccan-born German football player
- Mimoun Ben Ali (1935–2001), Spanish boxer
- Mimoun El Kadi (born 1987), Dutch football player
- Mimoun Eloisghiri (born 1989), Dutch football player
- Mimoun El Oujdi (born 1950), Moroccan singer
- Mimoun Mahi (born 1994), Dutch football player
- Mimoun Mansouri (born 1946), Moroccan general
- Mimoun Oaïssa (born 1975), Moroccan-Dutch actor and screenwriter
- Mimoun Ouitot, Moroccan Olympic alpine skier
- Mimoun Ouled Radi (born 1977), Dutch actor

Surname

- Abdel Wahed Ben Siamar Mimun (born 1941), Moroccan Olympic basketball player
- Alain Mimoun (1921–2013), Algerian-born French long-distance runner
- Martin Mimoun (born 1992), French football player
- Nadia Mimoun (born 1978), French Olympic rhythmic gymnast
- Rina Mimoun, American television writer and producer
