= 1957 Gabonese Territorial Assembly election =

Territorial Assembly elections were held in French Gabon on 31 March 1957. Although the Gabonese Democratic and Social Union (UDSG) won 14 of the 40 contested seats, the Gabonese Democratic Bloc was able to form a 21-seat coalition with the Entente–Defence of Gabonese Interests (a list headed by BDG member Paul Yembit) and five other MPs.

== Results ==
Party	Votes	%	Seats	+/–
Gabonese Democratic and Social Union	29,963	39.92	14	0
Gabonese Democratic Bloc	16,699	22.25	8	New
Union, Work, Progress	10,452	13.93	4	New
Entente–Defence of Gabonese Interests	10,299	13.72	8	New
François Meye List	4,335	5.78	3	New
Independent Planters	3,307	4.41	3	New
Total	75,055	100.00	40	+16
Valid votes	75,055	62.59		
Invalid/blank votes	44,861	37.41		
Total votes	119,916	100.00		
Registered voters/turnout	242,058	49.54		
Source: Sternberger et al.
