= Union, Work, Progress =

Union, Work, Progress (French: Union, Travail, Progrès) was an electoral list in Gabon.

== History ==
Headed by former Gabonese Democratic and Social Union member Jean-Stanislas Migolet, the list ran in the Ogooué-Lolo Province in the 1957 Territorial Assembly elections. It won all four seats in the province.
