= Rick ten Voorde =

Dutch footballer

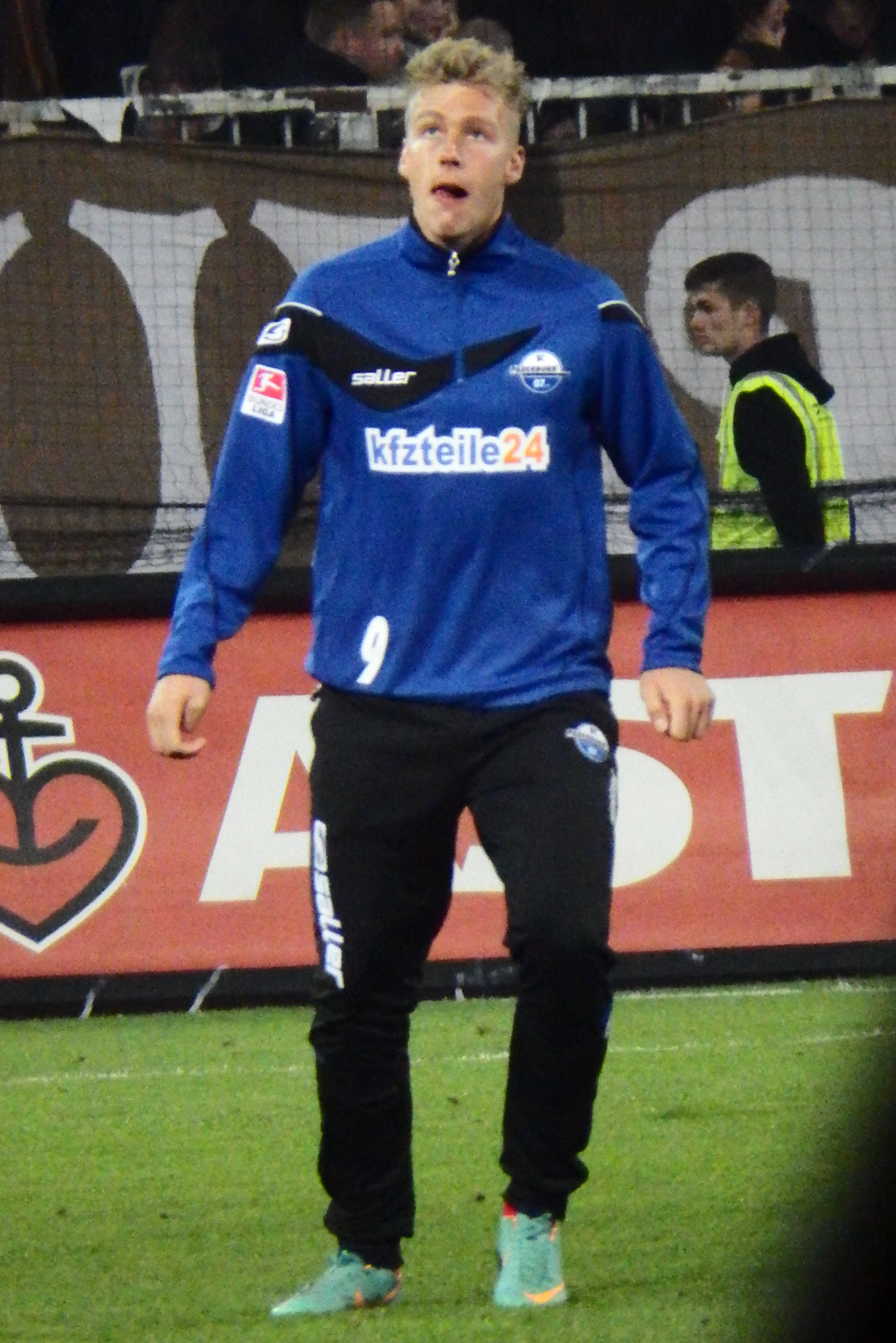
- Ten Voorde with Paderborn in 2013.

Personal information
- Date of birth: 20 June 1991 (age 35)
- Place of birth: Emmen, Netherlands
- Height: 1.87 m (6 ft 2 in)
- Positions: Centre forward; winger

Youth career
- DZOH
- Emmen

Senior career*
Years	Team	Apps	(Gls)
2008–2009	Emmen	18	(9)
2009–2013	NEC	41	(5)
2011–2012	→ RKC Waalwijk (loan)	27	(9)
2013	→ NAC Breda (loan)	18	(3)
2013–2015	Paderborn	13	(2)
2014–2015	→ Dordrecht (loan)	25	(1)
2015–2016	Emmen	35	(10)
2016–2017	Almere City	35	(9)
2017	Hapoel Ramat Gan	9	(0)
2018–2019	Víkingur	26	(5)
2019	→ Þór Akureyri (loan)	11	(5)
2020–2022	SV Rödinghausen	33	(3)
Total		291	(61)

International career
2009	Netherlands U18	1	(1)
2009	Netherlands U19	3	(0)
2010–2012	Netherlands U21	4	(1)
- * Club domestic league appearances and goals

Rick ten Voorde (born 20 June 1991) is a Dutch former footballer who played as a forward.

== Career ==
=== Emmen ===
Ten Voorde was born in Emmen. In his first half-season as 17-year-old striker in the Dutch Jupiler League he scored 9 goals in 18 matches for FC Emmen and garnered an invitation for the Dutch under-19 football team and a transfer to Eredivisie-side NEC, while clubs like AZ Alkmaar, FC Twente, R.S.C. Anderlecht, Newcastle United, Vitesse Arnhem and sc Heerenveen were interested in the striker. He was also chosen as Dutch first division talent of the year 2009. On 19 February 2009, he signed a three-year deal at NEC until 2012.

=== NEC ===
The new striker of NEC played well in the pre-season matches at his new club and scored his first goal for NEC against his former club Emmen. His good performances in preseason matches resulted in a call-up for the Netherlands U21 team as 18-year-old player. Ten Voorde is currently the youngest player of this team. On 21 November 2009, Ten Voorde made his official debut for NEC in an away match against NAC Breda, coming off the bench after 80 minutes and providing an assist. He made his first goal against ADO Den Haag after playing 45 minutes and being important in all the goals of the 2–3 away-win on 14 April 2010.

=== Return to Emmen ===
On 1 July 2015 Rick ten Voorde signed a one-year contract with Emmen. He scored his first goal upon return against RKC Waalwijk on 9 November 2015.

=== Later career ===
In August 2020, Ten Voorde signed with German Regionalliga West club SV Rödinghausen on a two-year contract.

== Career statistics ==
Updated 8 September 2010

Club	Season	League		Cup		Europe		Total	
Club	Season	Apps	Goals	Apps	Goals	Apps	Goals	Apps	Goals
FC Emmen	2008–09	18	9	0	0	–		18	9
FC Emmen	Total	18	9	0	0	–		18	9
Young N.E.C.	2009–10	6	1	1	0	–		11	3
Young N.E.C.	2010–11	3	3	1	1	–		4	4
Young N.E.C.	Total	9	4	2	1	–		15	7
N.E.C.	2009–10	6	1	0	0	–		15	2
N.E.C.	2010–11	6	1	0	0	–		9	5
N.E.C.	Total	12	2	0	0	–		24	7
SC Paderborn 07	2013–14	1	0	0	0	–		1	0
SC Paderborn 07	Total	1	0	0	0	–		1	0
Career Total		39	15	2	1	–		57	23

== Honours ==
Individual

- Bronze Bull (best talent) Eerste Divisie: 2009

NEC

- Trofeo Santa Cruz: Runner-up 2009
- Chippie Polar Cup: Runner-up 2010
