= Serhat Koç =

Dutch footballer

Personal information
- Full name: Serhat Koç
- Date of birth: 18 July 1990 (age 36)
- Place of birth: Eindhoven, Netherlands
- Height: 1.66 m (5 ft 5 1/2 in)
- Position: Forward

Team information
- Current team: VV Gestel

Youth career
- RKVV Brabantia
- Eindhoven AV
- FC Eindhoven

Senior career*
Years	Team	Apps	(Gls)
2007–2009	FC Eindhoven	47	(19)
2009–2011	Groningen	12	(0)
2010	→ Cambuur (loan)	15	(2)
2011	→ FC Eindhoven (loan)	17	(2)
2011–2013	FC Eindhoven	62	(22)
2013–2014	Helmond Sport	37	(12)
2014	Şanlıurfaspor	0	(0)
2014–2017	DOVO		
2015	→ Cappellen FC (loan)	11	(2)
2017–2019	SV TEC	69	(37)
2019–2021	Esperanza Pelt		
2021–2022	VV UNA		
2022–	VV Gestel		
- * Club domestic league appearances and goals as of 15:07, 29 October 2019 (UTC)

Serhat Koç (born 18 July 1990) is a Dutch former professional footballer who plays for KFC Esperanza Pelt.

== Career ==
Born in Eindhoven, Koç made his first first team appearance on 11 January 2008 against FC Volendam.

On 10 December 2008, he agreed on a transfer to FC Groningen. He joined his new club in July 2009. From August 2010 he played on loan for first division club SC Cambuur until January 2011. From then he joined FC Eindhoven on loan until the end of the season. In July 2011, Koc was transferred back to FC Eindhoven on a permanent basis. Koc immediately delivered with a goal and an assist in the first game of the new season, during Eindhoven's 3–0 win on FC Emmen. After two seasons he signed with Helmond Sport in the summer of 2013. He signed with Turkish side Sanliurfaspor in July 2014. However, he left the club in December 2014 and signed with Dutch Hoofdklasse side DOVO.

Ahead of the 2019–20 season, Koç joined Belgian club KFC Esperanza Pelt. In February 2021 it was confirmed that Koç would join VV UNA ahead of the upcoming 2021–22 season. Ahead of the 2022–23 season, he joined VV Gestel.

== Career statistics ==
=== Club ===
As of match played 25 October 2015

Appearances and goals by club, season and competition
Club	Season	League			National Cup		Other		Total	
Club	Season	Division	Apps	Goals	Apps	Goals	Apps	Goals	Apps	Goals
FC Eindhoven	2007-08	Eerste Divisie	11	1	0	0	0	0	11	1
FC Eindhoven	2008-09	Eerste Divisie	36	17	?	3	0	0	36	20
FC Eindhoven	Total		47	18	?	3	0	0	47	21
Groningen	2009–10	Eredivisie	12	0	1	0	0	0	13	0
Cambuur (loan)	2010–11	Eerste Divisie	15	2	2	0	0	0	17	2
FC Eindhoven (loan)	2010–11	Eerste Divisie	17	2	0	0	0	0	17	2
FC Eindhoven	2011–12	Eerste Divisie	32	11	3	1	2	0	37	12
FC Eindhoven	2012–13	Eerste Divisie	30	11	2	2	0	0	32	13
FC Eindhoven	Total		62	22	5	3	2	0	69	25
Helmond Sport	2013–14	Eerste Divisie	37	12	1	0	0	0	38	12
Şanlıurfaspor	2014–15	TFF First League	0	0	0	0	0	0	0	0
DOVO	2014–15	Hoofdklasse	0	0	0	0	1	3	1	3
Cappellen	2015–16	Belgian Third Division	11	2	0	0	0	3	11	2
TEC	2017–18	Tweede Divisie	0	0	0	0	0	0	0	0
Career total			201	58	9	6	3	3	213	67
