= Rowin van Zaanen =

Dutch footballer (born 1984)

Personal information
- Date of birth: 18 September 1984 (age 42)
- Place of birth: Amsterdam, Netherlands
- Height: 1.77 m (5 ft 10 in)
- Position: Winger

Youth career
- HBOK
- DWV

Senior career*
Years	Team	Apps	(Gls)
2002–2010	Volendam	129	(36)
2010–2012	Willem II	30	(3)
2012	→ Fortuna Sittard (loan)	13	(5)
2012–2013	Almere City	15	(3)
2014	Cincinnati Dutch Lions	5	(2)
2014–2015	Kozakken Boys	11	(3)
2015–2017	Achilles Veen	?	(?)
- * Club domestic league appearances and goals as of 6 September 2020

Rowin van Zaanen (born 18 September 1984) is a Dutch former professional footballer who played as a winger. He played in the Eredivisie and Eerste Divisie for Volendam, Willem II, Fortuna Sittard and Almere City, and in the American Premier Development League for the Cincinnati Dutch Lions.

Mostly known for his eight-year spell with FC Volendam, in which he won the Dutch Eerste Divisie and secured promotion to the Eredivisie in the 2007–08 season, van Zaanen retired from professional football in 2014 and played at amateur level until 2017. He made 129 league appearances for Volendam, in which he scored 36 goals. After retirement, he started working as a videographer.

== Career ==
Before moving to FC Volendam in 2003, van Zaanen played for the amateur clubs HBOK and DWV in Amsterdam. He made his professional debut on 9 May 2003 in a second-tier Eerste Divisie match against Stormvogels Telstar. In the 2007–08 season, he scored twelve goals in 34 appearances. Van Zaanen thus played a key role in the promotion of FC Volendam to the Eredivisie for the 2008–09 season. The club's stay at the highest level was, however, limited to one season as they suffered direct relegation after a year. Van Zaanen signed a two-year contract with Willem II in June 2010 with an option for another season. On 7 August 2010, he made his debut for the club against Heracles Almelo. In the winter break of the 2011–12 season, van Zaanen moved to Fortuna Sittard on loan. After completing his loan deal in June 2012, he signed a one-year contract with Almere City. He left the club as his contract expired.

Van Zaanen's professional career came to an end in 2014, after having been a free agent for almost a year after leaving Almere City. He went to play for another year as an amateur in the United States with the Cincinnati Dutch Lions. and then played at amateur level for Kozakken Boys and Achilles Veen before retiring permanently in 2017.

After retiring, Van Zaanen worked as a videographer.

== Honours ==
FC Volendam

- Eerste Divisie^{(II)}: 2007–08
