= Robin Huisman de Jong =

Dutch footballer

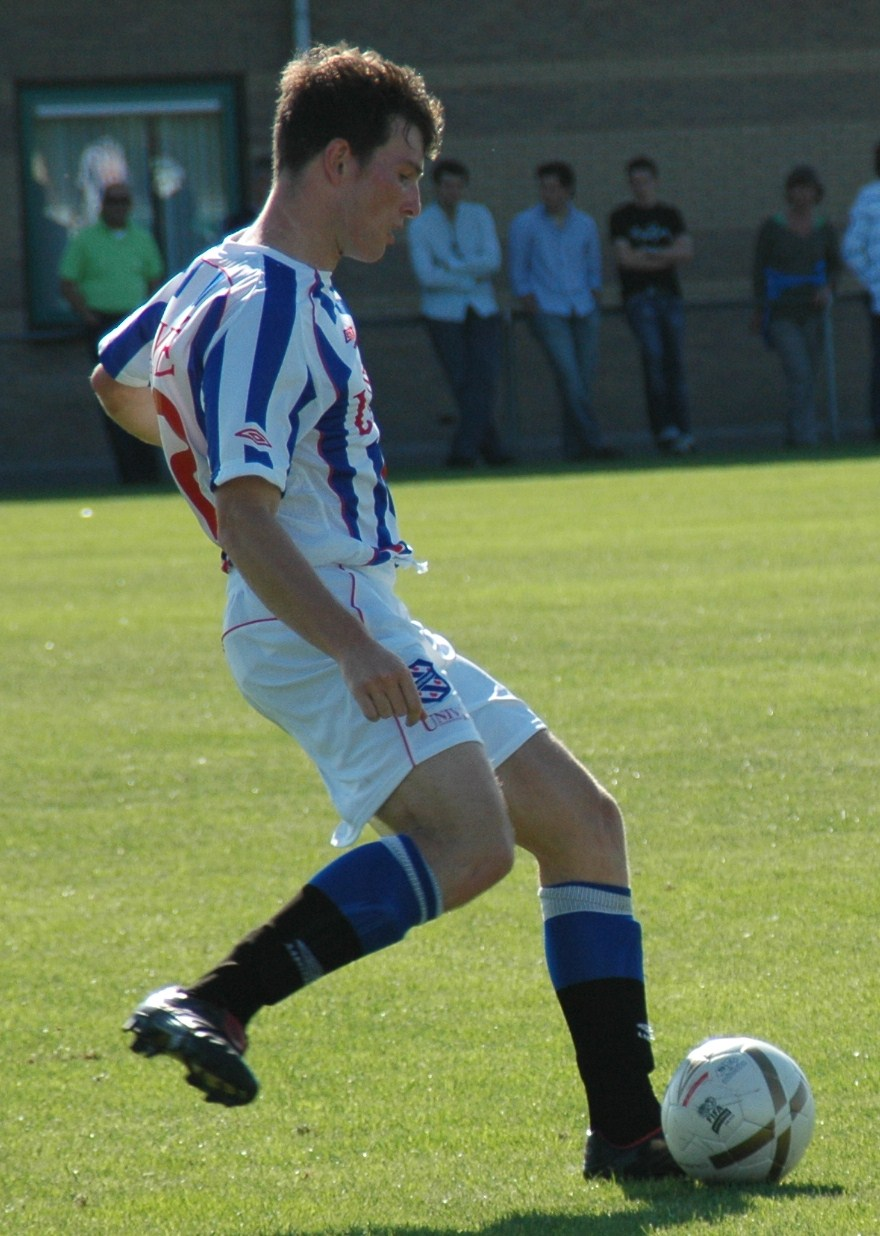
- Huisman de Jong with Heerenveen in 2008

Personal information
- Full name: Robin Huisman de Jong
- Date of birth: 8 June 1988 (age 38)
- Place of birth: Sneek, Netherlands
- Position: Defender

Youth career
- VV Sneek
- Heerenveen

Senior career*
Years	Team	Apps	(Gls)
2007–2009	Heerenveen	0	(0)
2009	→ Emmen (on loan)	15	(0)
2009–2011	BV Cloppenburg	68	(3)
2011–2012	Sneek Wit Zwart	0	(0)
2012–2017	Harkemase Boys		
2017–2023	Buitenpost	27	(3)

International career
2005	Netherlands U17	3	(0)
2006	Netherlands U18	2	(0)
2006	Netherlands U19	2	(0)
Medal record
Men's football
Representing Netherlands
UEFA European Under-17 Championship
Runner-up	2005
- * Club domestic league appearances and goals as of 17 January 2021

Robin Huisman de Jong (born 8 June 1988) is a Dutch retired footballer who last played as a defender for Hoofdklasse club Buitenpost.

After failing to break through to the Heerenveen first team due to knee injuries, Huisman de Jong moved to BV Cloppenburg in the German Oberliga Niedersachsen in 2009. After returning to the Netherlands two years later, he has appeared for Sneek Wit Zwart and Harkemase Boys.

He is a Dutch youth international; he has played for the U17 and U18 sides, and he was also a member of the Netherlands squad which failed to qualify for the 2007 UEFA European Under-19 Football Championship.
