= Sandro Calabro =

Dutch former footballer

Personal information
- Full name: Sandro Renato Calabro
- Date of birth: 11 April 1983 (age 43)
- Place of birth: The Hague, Netherlands
- Position: Striker

Youth career
- 1998–1999: VCS
- 1999–2001: Feyenoord

Senior career*
Years	Team	Apps	(Gls)
2001–2003	ADO Den Haag	17	(8)
2003–2004	Utrecht	21	(3)
2004–2005	FC Volendam	12	(6)
2005–2007	Helmond Sport	61	(24)
2007–2010	VVV	77	(39)
2010–2012	St. Gallen	15	(2)
2012–2013	Sparta	36	(19)
2013–2015	FC Antwerp	21	(8)
2014–2015	→ RKC (loan)	15	(6)
2015–2016	Deinze	15	(2)
2016–2017	Scheveningen		
- * Club domestic league appearances and goals

Sandro Calabro (born 11 April 1983) is a Dutch former professional footballer who played as a striker.

== Club career ==
Calabro was born in The Hague, the son of Sicilian parents.

He moved from FC Volendam to Helmond Sport. In May 2007, it was announced that he would sign for VVV-Venlo. In the 2008–09 season, he was crowned topscorer of the Jupiler League, as VVV-Venlo were promoted to the Eredivisie.

=== Switzerland ===
On 18 May 2010, Calabro moved on a free transfer to Swiss team FC St. Gallen, signing a contract until 30 June 2012.

=== Belgium ===
He joined compatriots Roy Bakkenes, Kelvin Maynard and manager Jerrel Hasselbaink at Belgian Second Division club FC Antwerp in 2013 after a prolific season at Sparta. After being loaned by Antwerp for one season to RKC, Calabro moved to another Belgian side Deinze in July 2015, only to return to Holland in summer 2016 to play for Scheveningen in the Dutch Derde Divisie.

== Post-playing career ==
After retirement, he focused on his own football agency business, which he started together with former Scheveningen teammate Marvin Nieuwlaat.

== Honours ==
=== Club ===
Utrecht

- Johan Cruyff Shield: 2004

=== Individual ===
VVV Venlo

- Top scorer Eerste Divisie 2008–09: 25 goals
