= Samir El Gaaouiri =

Dutch footballer and agent

Personal information
- Full name: Samir El Gaaouiri
- Date of birth: 28 May 1984 (age 42)
- Place of birth: Weert, Netherlands
- Height: 1.83 m (6 ft 0 in)
- Position: Winger

Youth career
- 1995–1999: DESM Weert
- 1999–2001: VVV-Venlo

Senior career*
Years	Team	Apps	(Gls)
2001–2004	Fortuna Sittard	52	(5)
2004–2007	Utrecht	8	(0)
2005–2006	→ Volendam (loan)	38	(11)
2006–2007	→ Haarlem (loan)	28	(3)
2007–2009	VVV	54	(14)
2009–2010	Roeselare	18	(4)
2010–2011	AGOVV	11	(1)
2012	Police United	0	(0)
Total		209	(38)

International career
2001-2002	Netherlands U18	4	(1)
2002-2003	Netherlands U19	4	(0)
- * Club domestic league appearances and goals

Samir El Gaaouiri (born 28 May 1984) is a Dutch former professional footballer and current football agent. He played as a winger.

== Club career ==
El Gaaouiri began his professional career in 2001 at Fortuna Sittard. The first season he played very few games, but in the next couple of seasons he made 48 appearances, in which he scored 5 goals. He signed with Utrecht in 2004. He would, however, only play 8 matches and therefore signed a one-season loan deal with Volendam, where he made 38 appearances during the season and scored 11 goals. His role as a reserve continued at Utrecht, and as a result he was sent on loan to Haarlem. There, he played 28 matches and scored only 3 goals. In 2007, he moved permanently to VVV-Venlo, where he was part of the team reaching promotion to the Eredivisie in the 2008–09 season. Personally, he experienced a strong season too, scoring 12 goals and providing 13 assists.

On 27 June 2009, El Gaaouiri signed a two-year contract with Belgian club Roeselare. After the dismissal of head coach Dennis van Wijk and the club's relegation to the Belgian Second Division, the contract of El Gaaouiri with Roeselare was dissolved in July 2010.

In February 2011, he started playing for AGOVV Apeldoorn. He left that club in the summer. In January 2012, he began playing for Police United. He retired from football in December 2012 without making an appearance for the club, after it was discovered that he had a heart condition.

After his retirement, El Gaaouri has worked as a players agent, representing Edson Braafheid among others.

== International career ==
El Gaaouiri played 4 games for both the Netherlands national under-18 football team and the U19s.

== Honours ==
VVV-Venlo

- Eerste Divisie: 2008–09
