= Mitchell Kappenberg =

Dutch footballer

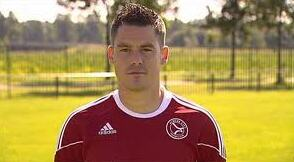
- A Dutch professional footballer

Personal information
- Full name: Mitchell Kappenberg
- Date of birth: 5 May 1986 (age 40)
- Place of birth: Haarlem, Netherlands
- Height: 1.76 m (5 ft 9 1/2 in)
- Position: Midfielder

Team information
- Current team: Ter Leede

Youth career
- ASC Waterwijk
- Zwarte Schapen
- Sporting Flevoland
- 2005: FC Groningen
- 2005–2006: AZ

Senior career*
Years	Team	Apps	(Gls)
2006–2007	AZ	0	(0)
2007–2010	FC Omniworld	62	(6)
2010–2011	HHC Hardenberg	1	(0)
2011–2013	Almere City	48	(2)
2013	Chiangrai United	10	(0)
2014–	Ter Leede	8	(2)
- * Club domestic league appearances and goals as of 31 March 2014 (UTC)

Mitchell Kappenberg (born 5 May 1986) is a Dutch professional footballer, who currently plays for Ter Leede in the Dutch Topklasse. He formerly played for Almere City and Chiangrai United.
