= 2008–09 KNVB Cup =

Tournament details
- Country: Netherlands
- Teams: 88

Final positions
- Champions: SC Heerenveen
- Runners-up: FC Twente

Tournament statistics
- Top goal scorer: Paul Weerman (5)

The 2008–09 KNVB Cup was the 91st edition of the Dutch national football annual knockout tournament for the KNVB Cup. 88 teams contested starting on 30 August 2008 and ending on 17 May 2009.

Feyenoord unsuccessfully defended its 2008 title losing in the fourth round stage in January 2009 to Heerenveen, 0–3, in Rotterdam. Heerenveen would successfully pursue its 2009 title on 17 May 2009 defeated Twente, 2–2 (aet), in De Kuip stadium, Rotterdam. 45,000 attended.

This Cup marked the third time in its history the absence of the Big Three teams from the quarter-finals onward of the tournament last occurring 27 years.

== Clubs ==
Participating clubs in the 2008–09 KNVB Cup by province:

Province	Rd 1	Rd 2^{1}	Rd 3	Rd 4	QF	SF	F	W
Drenthe	2	1+1	1	0	0	0	0	0
Flevoland	0	0+1	1	0	0	0	0	0
Friesland	1	0+2	2	1	1	1	1	1
Gelderland	7	5+4	6	4	2	0	0	0
Groningen	4	1+2	1	1	0	0	0	0
Limburg	2	1+4	2	1	1	0	0	0
North Brabant	9	1+10	6	1	1	1	0	0
North Holland	4	2+5	4	2	2	1	0	0
Overijssel	5	3+5	2	1	1	1	1	0
South Holland	11	7+5	7	5	0	0	0	0
Utrecht	3	3+1	0	0	0	0	0	0
Zeeland	0	0+0	0	0	0	0	0	0
Total	48	24+40; 64	32	16	8	4	2	1

^{1}Note: First numbers denote Rd1 winners; second numbers denote Rd2 entrants.

== Results ==
The first and second round draw was made on July 8, 2008 in Zeist, KNVB headquarters.

=== First round ===
The First Round featured 48 amateur teams: 35 Hoofdklasse clubs, 12 clubs from the 4th or lower levels and 2 reserve teams. 24 of the Hoofdklasse clubs qualified for the competition through their league performance during the previous season (top 4 of each Hoofdklasse), while the other half of the teams competing in the First Round secured their place through the 2007–08 KNVB District Cups. The matches were played on August 30 and 31, 2008.

Team 1	Score	Team 2
HSC '21	2–1	DOTO
Groene Ster	1–2 (aet)	FC Lisse
SMVC Fair Play	0–2	Ajax Amateurs
Quick Boys 2	7–2	Hollandia 2
Sparta Nijkerk	5–0	RKVVO
Hoogeveen	1–3	Be Quick '28
De Bataven	3–3 (aet, p. 3–1)	ONS Sneek
GVVV	1–1 (aet, p. 4–2)	Deurne
HHC Hardenberg	2–1	Schijndel
UNA	0–2	Kozakken Boys
Spakenburg	2–2 (aet, p. 8–7)	Gemert
Achilles '29	3–1	Achilles Veen
Baronie	0–4	Quick Boys
Rijnsburgse Boys	5–0	DESK
IJsselmeervogels	4–0	Glanerbrug
SHO	1–2	Papendrecht
De Treffers	4–0	Excelsior '31
Argon	1–3	Capelle
Eems Boys	0–3	EHC
ASVB	0–10	Haaglandia
DWV	0–1	FC Lienden
WKE	3–1	Unitas
XerxesDZB	1–6 (aet)	Be Quick 1887
Westlandia	1–1 (aet, p. 5–6)	Hollandia

=== Second round ===
The 24 winners from the First Round, together with 2 youth teams (winners of youth league and cup) and all clubs from both the Eredivisie and the Eerste Divisie qualified for the Second Round. The matches were played on September 23, 24 and 25, 2008.

Participants:

League	No.
Eredivisie	18
Eerste Divisie	20
Hoofdklasse	22
Eerste Klasse	1
Secondary Teams	1
Youth Champions	1
Youth Cup Winners	1
	64

Team 1	Score	Team 2
Rijnsburgse Boys (A)	2–1	RBC Roosendaal
PSV Youth	0–3	PSV
HHC Hardenberg (A)	1–1 (aet, p. 5–3)	Go Ahead Eagles
EHC (A)	0–3	Fortuna Sittard
IJsselmeervogels (A)	1–3	AGOVV
FC Den Bosch	2–1	Haarlem
Helmond Sport	2–2 (aet, p. 2–4)	FC Omniworld
SC Cambuur	3–3 (aet, p. 3–0)	FC Zwolle
FC Lisse (A)	3–4	Achilles '29 (A)
Quick Boys (A)	0–1	Willem II
FC Dordrecht	3–2	BV Veendam
Be Quick '28 (A)	1–2	RKC Waalwijk
AZ	3–0	Heracles Almelo
De Bataven (A)	0–1	Excelsior
FC Emmen	0–5	Twente
Kozakken Boys (A)	1–2 (aet)	WKE (A)
Sparta Nijkerk (A)	1–2 (aet)	FC Lienden (A)
De Treffers (A)	3–4 (aet)	De Graafschap
Spakenburg (A)	0–1	Telstar
MVV	0–3	SC Heerenveen
VVV	2–3 (aet)	FC Volendam
Ajax Amateurs (A)	0–2	Vitesse Arnhem
HSC '21 (A)	1–2	Sparta Rotterdam
GVVV (A)	1–3	NAC Breda
Quick Boys 2 (A)	0–3	FC Eindhoven
Capelle (A)	2–4	Roda JC
Feyenoord	3–0 (aet)	TOP Oss
Be Quick 1887 (A)	0–5	NEC
Hollandia (A)	2–3	FC Groningen
Papendrecht (A)	3–3 (aet, p.)	Haaglandia (A)
FC Twente Youth	1–4	ADO Den Haag
Ajax	2–0	FC Utrecht

(A) denotes amateur club

=== Third round ===
The winners the Second Round matches progressed to the Third Round. The matches were played on November 11, 12 and 13, 2008.

Participants:

League	No.
Eredivisie	16
Eerste Divisie	10
Hoofdklasse	6
	32

Team 1	Score	Team 2
Excelsior	2–0	Den Bosch
WKE (A)	2–4	De Graafschap
FC Omniworld	0–1	NAC Breda
Waalwijk	1–2	Achilles '29 (A)
NEC	1–0 (aet)	Rijnsburgse Boys (A)
AGOVV	2–3	Dordrecht
Roda JC	1–0	Willem II
Volendam	1–0 (aet)	Ajax
Sparta Rotterdam	2–1	Cambuur
Eindhoven	2–3	Twente
Heerenveen	7–0	Haaglandia (A)
FC Lienden (A)	1–0	Vitesse Arnhem
ADO Den Haag	4–1	Fortuna Sittard
Telstar	0–3	FC Groningen
AZ	1–0 (aet)	PSV
HHC Hardenberg (A)	1–5^{1}	Feyenoord

(A) denotes amateur club
^{1}The match was played in Emmen.

=== Fourth round ===
The Fourth Round was played on January 20, 21 and 28, 2009. With Feyenoord losing to Heerenveen 3-0, it marked the first time in 27 years and the third time ever in the KNVB Cup where any of the Big Three teams failed to reach the quarter-finals of the tournament.

Team 1	Score	Team 2
Dordrecht (1)	0–1	De Graafschap
Feyenoord	0–3	Heerenveen
NEC	2–1	Sparta Rotterdam
AZ	3–0	Achilles '29 (A)
Roda JC	2–0 (aet)	FC Lienden (A)
Volendam	3–0	SBV Excelsior (1)
NAC Breda	2–2 (aet, p. 5–4)	Groningen
ADO Den Haag	1–5	Twente

(A) denotes amateur club
(1) denotes Eerste Divisie club

=== Quarterfinals ===
4 March 2009
18:30 CET

Twente	1 – 0 (aet)	De Graafschap
Arnautović 121'	Report (in Dutch)

De Grolsch Veste, Enschede

4 March 2009
20:45 CET

Heerenveen	3 – 1	NEC
Henrique 38'; Ingelsten 74'; Elm 77'	Report (in Dutch)	Schøne 37'

Abe Lenstra Stadion, It Hearrenfean

5 March 2009
20:00 CET

Roda JC	2 – 3 (aet)	Volendam
Yulu-Matondo 55'; De Fauw 67'	Report (in Dutch)	Bakens 15'; Platje 74', 96'

Parkstad Limburg Stadion, Kerkrade

5 March 2009
20:45 CET

AZ	1 – 2	NAC Breda
Dembélé 13'	Report (in Dutch)	Boukhari 55'; Lurling 77'

DSB Stadion, Alkmaar

=== Semifinals ===
21 April 2009
20:45 CEST

Twente	3 – 1	NAC Breda
Janssen 53'; Denneboom 78'; Nkufo 86'	Report (in Dutch)	Lurling 23'

De Grolsch Veste, Enschede

22 April 2009
20:45 CEST

Volendam	0 – 2	Heerenveen
	Report (in Dutch)	Elm 11'; Pranjić 84'

Kras Stadion, Volendam

=== Final ===
17 May 2009
18:00 CEST

Heerenveen	2 – 2 (aet)	Twente
Popov 27'; Kalou 112'	Report (in Dutch)	Elia 54'; Hersi 118'
Penalties
Elm (penalty scored); Dingsdag (penalty scored); Breuer (penalty scored); Kalou (penalty scored); Sibon (penalty scored)	5–4	(penalty scored) Janssen; (penalty scored) Nkufo; (penalty missed) Hersi; (penalty scored) Braafheid; (penalty scored) Douglas

De Kuip, Rotterdam
Attendance: 45,000
Referee: Jan Wegereef
