= François Meye List =

The François Meye List (French: Liste François Meye) was an electoral list in Gabon.

== History ==
Headed by François Meye, the list ran in the Moyen-Ogooué Province in the 1957 Territorial Assembly elections. It won all three seats in the province. Meye joined the Gabonese Democratic Bloc coalition, which was able to form a government.
