= Engin Güngör =

Turkish footballer

Personal information
- Date of birth: 17 May 1986 (age 40)
- Place of birth: Nijmegen, Netherlands
- Positions: Attacking midfielder; wing

Team information
- Current team: Kırklarelispor
- Number: 23

Youth career
- NEC Nijmegen

Senior career*
Years	Team	Apps	(Gls)
2007–2008	FC Eindhoven	26	(4)
2008–2011	Hacettepe	15	(0)
2010	→ Kastamonuspor (loan)	22	(4)
2011	Gaziosmanpaşaspor	16	(0)
2011–2012	Tarsus Idman Yurdu	16	(0)
2012–2015	Altınordu	27	(5)
2015	Keçiörengücü	9	(0)
2015–	Kırklarelispor	45	(10)
- * Club domestic league appearances and goals as of 27 December 2016 (UTC)

Engin Güngör (born 17 May 1986 in Nijmegen) is a Turkish footballer. He currently plays for Kırklarelispor.
