= Rogier Krohne =

Dutch association football player

Personal information
- Date of birth: 23 November 1986 (age 39)
- Place of birth: Eelde, Netherlands
- Height: 1.93 m (6 ft 4 in)
- Position: Striker

Youth career
- VV Actief
- GRC Groningen
- –2005: FC Groningen

Senior career*
Years	Team	Apps	(Gls)
2005–2008	FC Groningen	4	(0)
2008–2009	FC Emmen	18	(0)
2009–2013	BV Cloppenburg	125	(85)
2013–2016	Preußen Münster	101	(20)
2016–2017	FC Emmen	22	(7)
2017	Schalke 04 II	14	(4)
2017–2020	VV Winsum		
Total		284	(116)
- * Club domestic league appearances and goals

Rogier Krohne (born 23 November 1986) is a Dutch former professional footballer who played as a striker.

== Career ==
Krohne began his career with FC Groningen, and made his debut as a substitute for Glen Salmon in a 2–1 defeat against RKC Waalwijk in the Eredivisie August 2005. He made a further three appearances over the following three years, but could not break into a strongly performing Groningen side, and left for FC Emmen of the Eerste Divisie in July 2008. He made eighteen appearances for Emmen in the 2008–09 season, all but one as a substitute, without getting on the scoresheet, before leaving at the end of the season.

Krohne then moved to Germany to sign for BV Cloppenburg of the fifth-tier Oberliga Niedersachsen-West. He scored 22 goals in the 2009–10 season as Cloppenburg finished 4th, then 25 the following year as they finished 2nd in the Oberliga Niedersachsen, the two regions having been merged into one division. The following year, Krohne scored fourteen times as Cloppenburg finished second again, enough for promotion as the Regionalliga was being re-structured. Krohne ended his first season in the Regionalliga Nord as the league's top scorer, with 24 goals as Cloppenburg finished 12th. He then signed for Preußen Münster of the 3. Liga.

In July 2017, Krohne joined VV Winsum of the Dutch sixth tier.
