= Raymond Fafiani =

Dutch footballer (born 1983)

Personal information
- Full name: Raymond Louis Eduard Fafiani
- Date of birth: 22 December 1983 (age 42)
- Place of birth: Amsterdam, Netherlands
- Height: 1.81 m (5 ft 11 1/2 in)
- Position: Midfielder

Youth career
- TOB
- 1996–1998: DWV
- 1998–2003: Vitesse

Senior career*
Years	Team	Apps	(Gls)
2003–2004	Vitesse	13	(1)
2004–2007	Twente	20	(0)
2005–2006	→ FC Zwolle (loan)	22	(2)
2006–2007	→ Telstar (loan)	5	(0)
2007–2012	Telstar	116	(10)
2012–2015	Volendam	71	(7)
2015–2016	Fortuna Sittard	15	(1)
2016–2024	JOS	52	(6)
Total		314	(27)

International career
2004–2005	Netherlands U21	5	(0)
- * Club domestic league appearances and goals

Raymond Fafiani (born 22 December 1983) is a Dutch former professional footballer who plays as a midfielder.

== Club career ==
Fafiani was scouted by Jan Jongbloed at local amateur side DWV to join Vitesse. He spent the large part of his career playing in the Dutch Eerste Divisie, but made his professional debut for Eredivisie side Vitesse against Roda JC in September 2003 and also had a season at FC Twente in the top tier. He was released by the club in summer 2006 after spending a season on loan at FC Zwolle and joined Telstar on loan before signing permanently. He would spend 6 years at the club.

In 2012 Fafiani signed a 2-year contract with FC Volendam, where he was voted player of the season, and in 2015 the left-footed midfielder was snapped up by Fortuna Sittard. After suffering a serious injury, he was released and moved to Hoofdklasse side JOS.

== International career ==
Fafiani played 5 games for the Netherlands national under-21 football team.
