= Martin Wille =

Liechtenstein footballer

Personal information
- Date of birth: 29 May 1986 (age 40)
- Place of birth: Liechtenstein
- Height: 1.76 m (5 ft 9 1/2 in)
- Positions: Defender; midfielder

Senior career*
Years	Team	Apps	(Gls)
2004–2019	FC Balzers		

International career^{‡}
2008	Liechtenstein	1	(0)
- * Club domestic league appearances and goals as of 19 July 2020 ‡ National team caps and goals as of 21 November 2009

Martin Wille (born 29 May 1986) is a former international footballer from Liechtenstein who played as a defender and midfielder. Wille played club football for FC Balzers.
