= Koen Garritsen =

Dutch footballer

Personal information
- Date of birth: 25 March 1983 (age 43)
- Place of birth: Winterswijk, Netherlands
- Height: 1.78 m (5 ft 10 in)
- Position: Midfielder

Youth career
- 1989-1995: WVC
- 1995-2001: De Graafschap
- 2001-2003: PSV

Senior career*
Years	Team	Apps	(Gls)
2003–2005	AGOVV	57	(4)
2005–2007	Fortuna Sittard	64	(3)
2007–2008	AGOVV	23	(4)
2008	FC Zwolle	8	(0)
2008–2010	AGOVV	46	(3)
2010–2011	De Treffers		
2011–2017	HSC '21		
Total		198	(14)

International career
2001-2002	Netherlands U19	6	(0)
2003	Netherlands U21	1	(0)
- * Club domestic league appearances and goals

Koen Garritsen (born 25 March 1983) is a Dutch retired football midfielder.

== Club career ==
Garritsen started his professional career with AGOVV and returned to the club for a third time in 2008 after spells at Fortuna Sittard and FC Zwolle. In 2010, he joined amateur side De Treffers, then leaving them after one year to play for HSC '21.

== International career ==
Garritsen was capped once by the Netherlands national under-21 football team and played 6 games for the U19s.

== Personal life ==
He started a "bubble ball" activity in his hometown Beltrum. In 2026, he started a padel centre in Winterswijk.
