= Mimoun El Kadi =

Dutch footballer

Personal information
- Date of birth: 9 May 1987 (age 39)
- Place of birth: The Hague, Netherlands
- Position: Midfielder

Youth career
- ?–2000: SV Erasmus
- 2000–2007: ADO Den Haag

Senior career*
Years	Team	Apps	(Gls)
2007–2009	ADO Den Haag	17	(2)
- * Club domestic league appearances and goals

Mimoun El Kadi (born 9 May 1987) is a Dutch former professional footballer.
