= Karim Fachtali =

Moroccan footballer

Personal information
- Full name: Abdelkarim Fachtali
- Date of birth: 30 March 1988 (age 38)
- Place of birth: Beni Saïd, Morocco
- Height: 1.78 m (5 ft 10 in)
- Position: Striker

Youth career
- Quick 1890
- Spakenburg
- ?–2002: IJsselmeervogels
- 2002–2004: ADO Den Haag
- 2004–2006: NEC

Senior career*
Years	Team	Apps	(Gls)
2007–2009	NEC	5	(0)
2008–2009	→ TOP Oss (loan)	33	(12)
2009–2010	FC Oss	17	(8)
2010	→ FC Omniworld (loan)	12	(3)
2010–2011	Almere City	32	(11)
2011–2012	RKC Waalwijk	5	(0)
2012	→ Go Ahead Eagles (loan)	15	(2)
2012	Kaisar	9	(1)
- * Club domestic league appearances and goals as of 12 December 2014 (UTC)

Abdelkarim Fachtali (born 30 March 1988) is a Moroccan football striker whose last known club was KaisarHe also holds Dutch citizenship.

== Career ==
Fachtali is a striker who made his debut in professional football, being part of the NEC Nijmegen squad in the 2006–07 season.

For the 2008–09 season, Fachtali played in a one-season loan deal for TOP Oss in the Jupiler League. In July 2009 he left NEC on a free transfer and signed with FC Oss until 2010. However, in December 2009 he left FC Oss after a conflict about his mentality. In January 2010 he has trained a few weeks with FC Omniworld/Almere City FC, and signed a contract until the end of the season. In the summer of 2011 Fachtali was signed by RKC Waalwijk, where he played only 5 matches in the first half of the season. He was sent on loan to Go Ahead Eagles for the rest of the season. He was set free by RKC Waalwijk and signed with FC Kaisar Kyzylorda from Kazakhstan.
