= Geoffrey Verweij =

Dutch footballer (born 1982)

Personal information
- Date of birth: 10 August 1982 (age 44)
- Place of birth: Amsterdam, Netherlands
- Height: 1.80 m (5 ft 11 in)
- Position: Striker

Senior career*
| Years | Team | Apps | (Gls) |
| 2002–2003 | Sparta Rotterdam | 5 | (0) |
| 2003–2006 | Haarlem | 93 | (18) |
| 2006–2009 | Emmen | 103 | (11) |
| Total | | 201 | (29) |
- * Club domestic league appearances and goals

Geoffrey Verweij (born 10 August 1982) is a Dutch former professional footballer who played as a striker.

== Career ==
During his professional career, which spanned from 2002 to 2009, Verweij played for Sparta Rotterdam, Haarlem and Emmen. After concluding his professional career, he played at amateur level for IJsselmeervogels, FC Chabab, Real Sranang, and Legmeervogels.
