= Marcel Pannekoek =

Dutch footballer (born 1986)

Personal information
- Date of birth: 3 May 1986 (age 40)
- Place of birth: Winsum, Netherlands
- Height: 1.93 m (6 ft 4 in)
- Position: Midfielder

Youth career
- VIBOA
- 1998–2005: Groningen

Senior career*
Years	Team	Apps	(Gls)
2005–2007	Groningen	2	(0)
2007–2009	Emmen	55	(9)
2009–2011	PKC '83		
2011–2012	Harkemase Boys	13	(4)
2012–2016	VIBOA		
2016–2022	VV Winsum		
- * Club domestic league appearances and goals

Marcel Pannekoek (born 3 May 1986) is a Dutch former professional footballer who played as a midfielder.

Pannekoek emerged as a talent from the FC Groningen youth academy in 2005, but did not manage to make his breakthrough for the first team. After a two-year stint with Eerste Divisie club Emmen, he moved to Hoofdklasse club PKC '83 in June 2009 where he would play while studying in Groningen.

In March 2011, it was announced that Pannekoek would move up a division, as he signed with third-tier club Harkemase Boys. After one season, he left after suffering a series of injuries. He joined his childhood club VIBOA afterwards, while taking over his father's jewellery store, Juwelier Pannekoek in Winsum, together with his sister Annemiek. In 2016, he continued with VV Winssum after VIBOA has merged with Hunsingo, and continued playing in the Eerste Klasse.
