= Geoffrey Meye =

Dutch footballer (born 1982)

Personal information
- Date of birth: 12 December 1982 (age 43)
- Place of birth: Nieuwegein, Netherlands
- Height: 1.74 m (5 ft 9 in)
- Position: Centre-back

Youth career
- SV Geinoord
- Elinkwijk
- PSV

Senior career*
Years	Team	Apps	(Gls)
2000–2004	Den Bosch	56	(3)
2005	→ Stormvogels Telstar (loan)	17	(2)
2005–2009	Telstar (Note: Stormvogels Telstar changed its name to SC Telstar in 2008.)	99	(7)
2009	Haarlem	3	(0)
2010	Cambuur	1	(0)
2010–2012	Spakenburg		
2012–2014	VVA '71		
- * Club domestic league appearances and goals

Geoffrey Meye (born 12 December 1982) is a Dutch former professional footballer who played on the professional level for Dutch club FC Den Bosch of the Eredivisie league during the 2001–02 season.

== Honours ==
Den Bosch

- Eerste Divisie: 2003–04
