= Jeffrey Vlug =

Dutch footballer

Personal information
- Full name: Jeffrey Mike Vlug
- Date of birth: 6 June 1986 (age 40)
- Place of birth: Woerden, Netherlands
- Height: 1.78 m (5 ft 10 in)
- Position: Winger

Youth career
- ARC
- VEP
- ADO Den Haag
- Sparta Rotterdam

Senior career*
Years	Team	Apps	(Gls)
2006–2009	Sparta Rotterdam	22	(3)
2007–2008	→ RBC Roosendaal (loan)	31	(6)
2008	→ Go Ahead Eagles (loan)	18	(2)
2009	→ RBC Roosendaal (loan)	10	(1)
2009–2011	FC Eindhoven	47	(11)
2011–2013	FC Den Bosch	61	(7)
2013–2015	Fortuna Sittard	45	(6)
2015–2016	Rijnsburgse Boys	0	(0)
2016–2020	USV Hercules		
- * Club domestic league appearances and goals as of 9 June 2014 (UTC)

Jeffrey Mike Vlug (born 6 June 1986) is a Dutch former professional footballer. He played as a winger.

Vlug is a forward who was born in Woerden and made his debut in professional football, being part of the Sparta Rotterdam squad in the 2006–07 season. He would then play for a number of Dutch clubs, including Go Ahead Eagles and FC Eindhoven.

In 2015, Vlug moved to Rijnsburgse Boys, but left again after six months. He later began playing for USV Hercules, where he was appointed team captain. Vlug decided to retire from football after the 2019–20 season, but as the Dutch competitions were cut short due to the COVID-19 pandemic, he officially retired on 3 April 2020.
