= Rob Meppelink =

Dutch footballer and manager

Personal information
- Full name: Rob Meppelink
- Date of birth: 18 January 1966 (age 60)
- Place of birth: Wateringen, Netherlands

Senior career*
| Years | Team | Apps | (Gls) |
| 1973–1984 | Velo | | |
| 1984–1988 | HMSH | | |
| 1988–1991 | Velsenoord | | |

Managerial career
- 1990–1991: AZ Alkmaar (youth coach)
- 1991–1996: ADO Den Haag (youth coach)
- 1995–1996: ADO Den Haag (head coach)
- 1996–1999: ADO Den Haag (assistant)
- 1999–2000: ADO Den Haag (head coach)
- 2001–2007: RBC Roosendaal (technical manager)
- 2007–2008: RBC Roosendaal (head coach)
- 2012–: Guadalajara (physical trainer)
- * Club domestic league appearances and goals

Rob Meppelink (born 18 January 1966 in Wateringen) is a former amateur football player from Netherlands. He became a football coach in 1990. Since then he guided clubs like AZ Alkmaar, ADO Den Haag, and RBC Roosendaal.
