= Abdelhali Chaiat =

Dutch-Moroccan footballer

Personal information
- Full name: Abdelhali Chaiat
- Date of birth: 15 November 1983 (age 43)
- Place of birth: Saka, Morocco
- Height: 1.73 m (5 ft 8 in)
- Position: Forward

Youth career
- Amersfoortse Boys
- Utrecht

Senior career*
Years	Team	Apps	(Gls)
2002–2004	Utrecht	19	(3)
2004–2008	Volendam	98	(22)
2008–2010	De Graafschap	0	(0)
2010–2011	AGOVV	24	(2)
Total		141	(27)
- * Club domestic league appearances and goals

Abdelhali "Appie" Chaiat (born 15 November 1983) is a Dutch-Moroccan retired footballer. His final professional contract was with Dutch second division side AGOVV Apeldoorn, where he left in 2011. He played as a striker.

== Career ==
=== Utrecht ===
Chaiat began his professional career at FC Utrecht. On 11 April 2003, he made his debut in an Eredivisie-match against Willem II which ended 1–1. In his first season in Utrecht, he played seven league-matches and scored two goals. The following year, he was mostly on the bench or a reserve.

=== Volendam and De Graafschap ===
In the 2004–05 season, Chaiat was signed by FC Volendam, who then played in the Eerste Divisie. He stayed in Volendam for four years and eventually won the league in 2008, and therefore promotion to the Eredivisie. Subsequently, Chaiat becomes heavily injured in a friendly against the Suriprofs. De Graafschap had already signed him on a pre-contract prior to the injury. On 20 July 2010, his contract was terminated after he gained too much weight, after more than a year of medical rehabilitation, since the injury.

=== AGOVV ===
Hereafter, Chaiat signed a contract with AGOVV Apeldoorn.

He later played for amateur sides FC Presikhaaf and NVC.

== Honours ==
Utrecht

- KNVB Cup: 2002–03, 2003–04

De Graafschap

- Eerste Divisie: 2009–10
