= John S. Apperson =

American engineer and forest preservationist (1878–1963)

John Samuel Apperson Jr. (6 April 1878 – 1 February 1963), known as Appie, was a General Electric engineer best known for his role in the protection of the Adirondack Forest Preserve.

== Early life and career ==
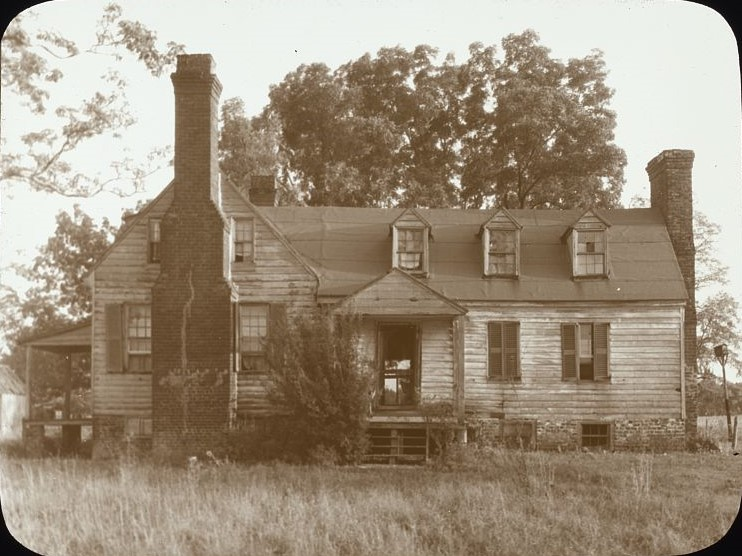
Apperson Farm House, New Kent County, Virginia, by Frances Benjamin Johnston, ca. 1930s

Apperson was born and raised in Virginia, the son of John Samuel Apperson Sr., a medical doctor. He attended, but did not graduate from Virginia Agricultural and Mechanical College (now Virginia Tech). Apperson worked at General Electric's Schenectady, New York manufacturing plant for 47 years. He was trained in their Test Program, and was promoted to the second most senior engineer working in the Power and Mining Department. After World War I he moved into a management position in Engineering General, where he dealt with coordination of the difficult orders for the many branches of the company.

== Preservationist ==
As a preservationist and conservation activist, he was focused on the protection of the Adirondack Forest Preserve and of Lake George and its islands. He was prominent in working with NYS to acquire lands in the High Peaks and around Lake George for inclusion in the Forest Preserve.

During the earliest years of the twentieth century, Apperson developed a powerful modus operendi utilizing an officially registered NYS 'front' organization with a recognized title and ostensibly, a wide membership. Under this umbrella organization, Apperson gained a degree of unanimity as well as an implied widespread assemblage of like-minded citizens whose influence he could wield as the situation demanded. Associates could move fast and decisively under the cover of the organization. He learned to use the power of the photograph and the news release and used it to his advantage against the slower moving state agencies.

Among the most notable of Apperson's organizations was Forest Preserve Association of New York State, which he organized in 1934. Organized in 1936 was the New York state Trails Conference, Inc, and in 1944, Apperson created the Lake George Protective Association, Inc.

Apperson was a charter member of the Adirondack Mountain Club and served for many years on its Conservation Committee, the Wilderness Society of America, and the American Skate Sailing Association. He was a member of the Adirondack Moose River Committee, American Canoe Association, Association for the Protection of the Adirondacks, Citizens Northway Committee, Constitutional Council for the Forest Preserve, Lake George Association, New York-New Jersey Trails Conference, Schenectady County Conservation Council.

== Personal life ==
John Apperson was one of the earliest ski mountaineers and proponents of skiing in the Adirondacks. He is considered by some to be among the earliest ski mountaineers in North America. Together with his friend and fellow GE co-worker, Dr. Irving Langmuir, Apperson pioneered some of the earliest ski ascents of several Adirondack High Peaks as well as many peaks around Lake George. Apperson and Langmuir can also be credited with very early ski treks into Tuckerman Ravine and Mount Washington in New Hampshire as well as early ski ascents of Mount Killington (Vermont) and Mount Greylock (Massachusetts).

Somewhat ironically, despite their roles in the earliest history of skiing in the Adirondacks, both Apperson and Langmuir came to oppose the development of commercialized skiing in the Adirondack Forest Preserve because it seemed to them contrary to the 'forever wild' clause in the New York State constitution (currently, Art. XIV Sec. 1).

== Published works ==
Apperson was a prolific author of pamphlets, newspaper and magazine articles regarding conservation issues. His personal papers and photographic archive are housed at the Adirondack Research Library of Union College, Niskayuna, NY.
