= Jürgen Heinrichs =

German footballer

Personal information
- Date of birth: 21 January 1977 (age 49)
- Place of birth: Geilenkirchen, Germany
- Height: 1.93 m (6 ft 4 in)
- Position: Midfielder

Senior career*
Years	Team	Apps	(Gls)
–2003	GFC Düren		
2003	FSV Geilenkirchen		
2004	Fortuna Köln		
2004–2005	1. FC Köln II		
2006	1. FC Kleve		
2007–2009	Fortuna Sittard		
2010–2011	SV Bergisch Gladbach 09		
- * Club domestic league appearances and goals

Jürgen Heinrichs (born 21 January 1977) is a German former professional footballer who played as a midfielder.
