= Gunter Thiebaut =

Belgian footballer

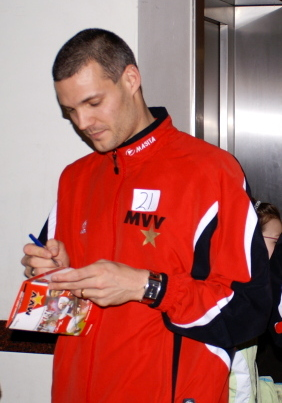
- Gunter Thiebaut in 2008.

Personal information
- Full name: Gunter Thiebaut
- Date of birth: 12 January 1977 (age 49)
- Place of birth: Asse, Belgium
- Height: 1.84 m (6 ft 0 in)
- Position: Striker

Senior career*
Years	Team	Apps	(Gls)
1997–1998	Lebbeke		
1998–2001	Eendracht Aalst	91	(20)
2001–2002	Omonia Nicosia	22	(8)
2002–2003	FCV Dender EH	33	(23)
2003–2006	1. FC Saarbrücken	57	(23)
2006–2007	Zulte Waregem	14	(1)
2006–2007	→ FCV Dender EH (loan)	34	(21)
2007–2009	MVV	67	(42)
2009–2011	Lierse	44	(7)
2011–2012	FCV Dender EH	25	(10)
2012–2014	KVK Ninove		
2015–2018	KFC Wambeek		
- * Club domestic league appearances and goals

Gunter Thiebaut (born 12 January 1977) is a Belgian retired footballer who played as a striker.

== Club career ==
=== Early career ===
Thiebaut's professional career started at Lebbeke. Thiebaut was then signed by Eendracht Aalst in Summer 1998, a team that played in the First Division. After showing some great displays, he moved to Cypriot team Omonia Nicosia, and returned to Belgium after that.

In Belgium he played for Dender, which was known as FC Denderleeuw at that time. Here, he showed his goalscoring capabilities. In the 2002–2003 season at Denderleeuw, Thiebaut was top-scorer in the Belgian Second Division.

=== New adventure & topscorer ===
His great scoring earned him another adventure. In Germany he was signed by 1. FC Saarbrücken. He played some good seasons, but decided to find his way back to Belgium in 2005. S.V. Zulte Waregem was his new team in the 2006–2007 season. Thiebaut also became top scorer with 21 goals this season, the same number of goals as Gabriel Persa who played for Dessel Sport and Fraizer Campbell playing for Royal Antwerp on loan from Manchester United.

=== MVV ===
After that, he moved to Dender and finally to MVV, another adventure abroad, this time in the Netherlands. In Maastricht he scored in his first game for MVV two times. The first goal, in the third minute, was the first goal in the season. In December 2007 was chosen footballer of the year in Eerste divisie, he was nominated as the best player in Netherlands Limburg in 2007. At MVV he scored 42 goals in 2 seasons.

=== Lierse ===
On 26 June 2009 it was announced that Thiebaut joined Belgian Second Division club Lierse SK.
