= 2007–08 Eerste Divisie =

52nd season of the second-tier football league in Netherlands

- Champions: FC Volendam
- Promoted: FC Volendam, ADO Den Haag

The 2007/2008 season of the Eerste Divisie began in August 2007 and will end in May 2008.

== New teams ==
These teams were relegated from the Eredivisie at the start of the season:

- RKC Waalwijk (17th position, relegated after playoffs)
- ADO Den Haag (18th position)

== Final league standings ==
Pos	Team	Pld	W	D	L	GF	GA	GD	Pts	Promotion or qualification
1	FC Volendam (C, P)	38	22	11	5	90	46	+44	77	Promotion to the Eredivisie
2	RKC Waalwijk	38	22	11	5	84	44	+40	77	Qualification for promotion play-offs Second Round
3	FC Den Bosch	38	21	7	10	61	37	+24	70	Qualification for promotion play-offs Second Round
4	FC Zwolle	38	18	13	7	70	42	+28	67	Qualification for promotion play-offs Second Round
5	MVV	38	16	12	10	66	50	+16	60	Qualification for promotion play-offs Second Round
6	ADO Den Haag (P)	38	16	10	12	58	50	+8	58	Qualification for promotion play-offs First Round
7	Helmond Sport	38	17	7	14	53	52	+1	58	Qualification for promotion play-offs First Round
8	TOP Oss	38	15	10	13	58	61	−3	55	Qualification for promotion play-offs First Round
9	FC Emmen	38	14	11	13	61	74	−13	53	
10	Go Ahead Eagles	38	16	3	19	60	64	−4	51	Qualification for promotion play-offs First Round
11	RBC Roosendaal	38	13	10	15	46	49	−3	49	
12	FC Dordrecht	38	12	11	15	59	52	+7	47	
13	FC Omniworld	38	11	14	13	56	55	+1	47	
14	Stormvogels Telstar	38	14	4	20	41	51	−10	46	
15	BV Veendam	38	11	14	13	57	67	−10	44 (Note: BV Veendam and AGOVV Apeldoorn were docked three points for financial irregularities.)	
16	Fortuna Sittard	38	10	10	18	48	69	−21	40	
17	SC Cambuur	38	10	9	19	50	68	−18	39	
18	AGOVV Apeldoorn	38	12	5	21	66	98	−32	38	
19	FC Eindhoven	38	8	8	22	49	83	−34	32	
20	HFC Haarlem	38	5	14	19	39	60	−21	29	

(C) Champions; (P) Promoted

=== Period winners ===
The competition is divided into six periods (Dutch: periode) of six matches each. The winner of each period (Dutch: periodekampioen) qualifies for the playoffs at the end of the season. If the winner of a period has already won a prior period in the season, the second placed team in the period is awarded the playoff slot. If the second placed team has also won a prior period, no winner is called, and the playoff slot is decided by league standing at the end of the season.

Period	Team	Pld	W	D	L	GF	GA	GD	Pts
1	FC Den Bosch	6	5	0	1	14	8	+6	15
2	RKC Waalwijk	6	5	0	1	12	6	+6	15
3	Go Ahead Eagles	6	5	0	1	7	3	+4	15
4	FC Volendam	6	3	3	0	17	8	+9	12
5	FC Zwolle	6	4	2	0	16	5	+11	14
6	Not awarded (Note: FC Volendam, the winner of period 4, had finished first in this period. FC Den Bosch, winner of period 1, had finished second. This period has not been awarded, the playoff slot will be awarded to the highest-ranked team without a period title in the final standings.)	0	0	0	0	0	0	0	0

== Results ==
Home \ Away	ADO	AGO	CAM	DBO	DOR	EIN	EMM	FOR	GAE	HAA	HEL	MVV	OMN	RBC	RKC	STO	TOP	VEE	VOL	ZWO
ADO Den Haag		3–0	1–0	0–1	2–1	5–2	2–2	3–0	1–2	2–1	2–0	0–3	1–1	0–0	0–1	3–0	5–1	0–0	0–1	3–1
AGOVV Apeldoorn	1–1		2–2	0–1	3–2	2–0	4–5	2–3	2–0	4–3	3–1	4–1	5–1	2–1	2–6	0–1	1–4	5–0	3–6	0–1
SC Cambuur	2–1	0–1		0–2	2–1	1–1	0–1	2–2	0–2	1–3	5–1	0–1	1–0	2–2	2–0	0–1	1–2	1–1	2–1	1–1
FC Den Bosch	0–2	3–1	4–2		2–1	2–0	1–1	1–1	3–1	3–1	0–2	1–1	4–1	2–0	1–1	3–0	1–1	4–0	1–1	0–0
FC Dordrecht	5–0	1–1	2–3	1–0		1–1	2–1	1–0	5–0	1–1	0–1	1–2	3–3	1–0	0–1	1–0	1–1	2–2	1–1	1–1
FC Eindhoven	0–0	4–1	2–1	1–0	1–3		2–3	1–0	2–0	2–2	3–0	3–1	2–2	1–2	1–4	0–0	4–2	0–1	2–6	1–2
FC Emmen	1–2	3–3	2–0	0–3	1–0	2–1		1–1	3–1	3–0	2–1	1–1	0–0	1–2	1–2	1–1	2–1	3–2	2–2	0–1
Fortuna Sittard	2–2	5–2	2–0	0–1	2–5	3–0	3–3		2–2	1–0	0–1	0–7	3–1	0–0	1–1	0–3	0–1	2–0	0–1	0–3
Go Ahead Eagles	1–2	4–0	3–1	2–3	1–2	1–1	6–0	2–1		3–3	1–2	2–1	1–0	1–2	2–0	1–2	2–0	0–1	1–2	3–1
HFC Haarlem	2–0	2–1	0–1	0–2	1–1	3–1	1–2	1–2	0–1		0–1	0–0	2–2	1–1	2–2	0–1	0–0	3–1	2–2	1–1
Helmond Sport	2–0	5–0	1–1	0–1	2–1	4–1	0–3	1–1	3–0	1–1		2–2	2–1	2–0	3–3	2–1	0–1	1–2	2–1	0–2
MVV	2–1	2–3	2–2	2–1	3–2	4–1	5–1	4–1	0–1	2–0	0–1		0–0	1–1	1–1	2–1	2–2	1–1	2–0	4–1
FC Omniworld	4–0	5–0	1–2	1–0	1–0	3–1	4–1	1–1	0–4	2–0	3–1	1–1		2–3	2–2	1–2	4–0	0–0	1–1	1–3
RBC Roosendaal	0–1	2–1	1–0	0–1	1–2	3–0	4–0	1–0	0–2	1–1	1–4	1–2	2–1		0–4	2–0	0–1	4–1	1–2	2–1
RKC Waalwijk	2–2	3–0	6–3	3–2	4–1	1–0	3–1	2–1	7–2	2–0	2–1	1–0	1–1	2–0		1–2	3–0	5–2	2–3	2–0
Stormvogels Telstar	1–2	4–4	1–2	0–1	1–4	2–0	0–1	4–1	1–2	1–0	2–0	0–3	0–1	2–1	2–0		1–1	2–1	2–3	0–1
TOP Oss	1–3	2–0	3–2	2–1	1–1	3–1	4–4	2–0	1–0	4–1	1–1	4–1	1–2	3–3	2–2	1–0		1–2	0–2	2–4
BV Veendam	3–3	5–1	4–4	0–3	2–1	4–1	3–1	3–1	4–2	1–1	0–1	0–0	1–1	0–0	0–1	2–0	0–2		3–3	2–2
FC Volendam	2–2	1–2	3–0	4–1	2–0	6–2	5–1	2–3	5–1	1–0	4–0	1–0	3–0	1–1	1–1	2–0	3–0	2–2		2–2
FC Zwolle	2–1	5–0	4–1	4–1	1–1	3–3	1–1	2–3	1–0	3–0	1–1	7–0	1–1	1–1	0–0	1–0	1–0	3–1	1–2	

Legend: Blue = home team win; Yellow = draw; Red = away team win.

== Playoffs ==
=== Round 1 ===
Team 1	Agg.	Team 2	1st leg	2nd leg
Go Ahead Eagles	1–4	ADO Den Haag	1–1	0–3
TOP Oss	2–5	Helmond Sport	2–2	0–3

=== Round 2 (best of 3) ===
Team 1	Pts	Team 2	1st leg	2nd leg	3rd leg
ADO Den Haag	3–1	VVV-Venlo	1–0	0–1	2–0
MVV	1–6	RKC Waalwijk	1–0	0–2	0–4
FC Zwolle	3–2	FC Den Bosch	0–1	2–1	1–0
Helmond Sport	3–6	De Graafschap	2–3	1–3	Not played

=== Round 3 (best of 3) ===
Team 1	Pts	Team 2	1st leg	2nd leg	3rd leg
ADO Den Haag	5–4	RKC Waalwijk	1–1	2–2	2–1
FC Zwolle	1–3	De Graafschap	1–3	0–0	Not played

ADO Den Haag and De Graafschap will play in the 2008–09 Eredivisie.

== Top scorers ==
Goals	Player	Team
26	(Netherlands) Jack Tuyp	FC Volendam
22	(Belgium) Gunther Thiebaut	MVV
19	(Netherlands) Ruud ter Heide	AGOVV Apeldoorn
18	(Netherlands) Koen van der Biezen	FC Den Bosch
17	(Belgium) Fabio Caracciolo	FC Eindhoven
16	(Netherlands) Erik Quekel	TOP Oss

Last updated: April 18, 2008

== Attendances ==
#	Club	Average
1	MVV	5,973
2	ADO	5,118
3	Cambuur	4,492
4	RKC	4,476
5	Go Ahead	4,422
6	Den Bosch	4,161
7	Fortuna	3,486
8	Zwolle	3,437
9	Emmen	3,387
10	Helmond	3,303
11	RBC	3,039
12	Veendam	2,995
13	Volendam	2,830
14	AGOVV	2,246
15	Oss	2,124
16	Dordrecht	2,122
17	Omniworld	1,836
18	Haarlem	1,742
19	Eindhoven	1,673
20	Telstar	1,358

== See also ==
- 2007–08 Eredivisie
- 2007–08 KNVB Cup
