= 2007–08 KNVB Cup =

Tournament details
- Country: Netherlands
- Teams: 87

Final positions
- Champions: Feyenoord
- Runners-up: Roda JC

Tournament statistics
- Top goal scorer: Roy Makaay (7)

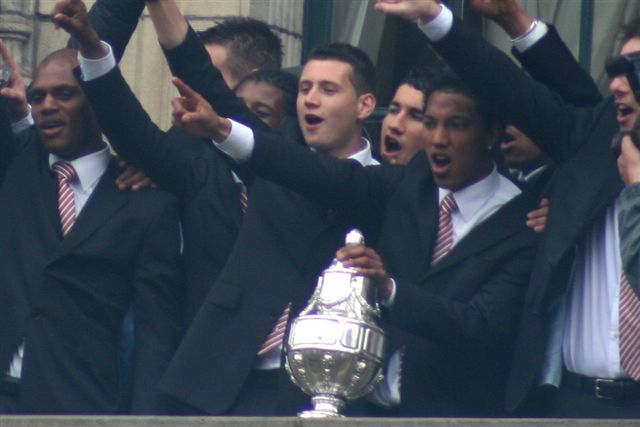

The 2007–08 KNVB Cup was the 90th edition of the Dutch national football annua; knockout tournament for the KNVB Cup. 87 teams contested, beginning on 25 August 2007 and ending at the final on 27 April 2008 at Feijenoord Stadion, in Rotterdam.

Ajax unsuccessfully defended its 2007 title, losing in the round of 16 on 16 January 2008 to NAC Breda. Feyenoord successfully pursued its 11th cup title, defeating Roda JC 2–0, and qualified for the 2008–09 UEFA Cup.

== Teams ==
- All 18 participants of the Eredivisie 2007-08
- All 20 participants of the Eerste Divisie 2007-08
- Two youth teams
- 47 teams from lower (amateur) leagues, the only teams that entered in the first round (one amateur team entered in the second round)

== First round ==
Only amateur clubs from the Hoofdklasse and below participated in this round. Türkiyemspor were expelled from the cup tournament as a result of financial problems, their opponents VVSB advanced to the second round automatically.

25 August 2007

| DHC | 1 – 6 | DOTO |

| BVV Barendrecht | 0 – 2 | AFC |

| VV Nunspeet | 0 – 1 | VV UNA |

| ASWH | 1 – 1 (a.e.t.) 4 – 3 (p) | WKE |

| Quick Boys | 4 – 1 | VV Sneek |

| VV Bennekom | 8 – 0 | De Meteoor |

| VV Spakenburg | 2 – 0 | HSC'21 |

| RKVV Roosendaal | 2 – 1 | Harkemase Boys |

| Elinkwijk | 2 – 1 | Sparta Nijkerk |

| EVV Echt | 4 – 0 | VV Rijsoord |

| BVV/Caterpillar | 0 – 3 | FC Lisse |

| SV Babberich | 1 – 2 | HHC Hardenberg |

| SV Argon | 3 – 0 | VV Noordwijk |

| WSV Apeldoorn | 2 – 3 | ONS Sneek |

| SV Deurne | 1 – 0 | Flevo Boys |

| WHC | 3 – 1 | RKSV Schijndel |

| Be Quick 1887 | 3 – 2 | Rijnsburgse Boys |

| De Treffers | 2 – 0 | ACV Assen |

| ADO'20 | 0 – 3 | IJsselmeervogels |

| VV Baronie | 0 – 1 | Be Quick '28 |

| VV Gemert | 1 – 4 | Kozakken Boys |

| SV Meerssen | 1 – 0 | Excelsior '31 |

26 August 2007

| RKSV Groene Ster | 2 – 0 | JVC Cuijk |

== Second round ==
The Eredivisie and Eerste divisie teams; the two youth teams and one extra amateur team entered the tournament this round.

25 September 2007

| Be Quick 1887 _{A} | 1 – 8 | FC Omniworld _{1} |

| EVV _{A} | 1 – 3 | MVV _{1} |

| FC Eindhoven _{1} | 4 – 2 | Vitesse Arnhem _{E} |

| Fortuna Sittard _{1} | 3 – 1 | FC Emmen _{1} |

| Helmond Sport _{1} | 0 – 1 | Go Ahead Eagles _{1} |

| RKC Waalwijk _{1} | 4 – 3 | RBC Roosendaal _{1} |

| VV Spakenburg _{A} | 0 – 2 | Roda JC _{E} |

| TOP Oss _{1} | 1 – 2 | BV Veendam _{1} |

| WHC _{A} | 0 – 2 | FC Dordrecht _{1} |

| FC Lisse _{A} | 4 – 4 (a.e.t.) 2 – 3 (p) | AGOVV Apeldoorn _{1} |

| HFC Haarlem _{1} | 1 – 1 (a.e.t.) 4 – 3 (p) | Willem II _{E} |

| FC Volendam _{1} | 3 – 3 (a.e.t.) 2 – 4 (p) | Sparta Rotterdam _{E} |

26 September 2007

| RKSV Groene Ster _{A} | 1 – 0 | DOTO Rotterdam _{A} |

| RKVV Roosendaal _{A} | 1 – 3 | Quick Boys _{A} |

| SV Argon _{A} | 0 – 3 | sc Heerenveen _{E} |

| Be Quick '28 _{A} | 0 – 0 (a.e.t.) 3 – 4 (p) | ADO Den Haag _{1} |

| De Treffers _{A} | 2 – 0 | ASWH _{A} |

| Excelsior _{E} | 3 – 2 | VVV-Venlo _{E} |

| IJsselmeervogels _{A} | 1 – 8 | FC Groningen _{E} |

| Young sc Heerenveen | 0 – 3 | PSV _{E} |

| Young Stormvogels Telstar | 1 – 2 | NAC Breda _{E} |

| Kozakken Boys _{A} | 1 – 2 (a.e.t.) | Ajax _{E} |

| ONS Sneek _{A} | 2 – 2 (a.e.t.) 3 – 4 (p) | FC Zwolle _{1} |

| VV UNA _{A} | 1 – 0 | VV Bennekom _{A} |

| Feyenoord _{E} | 3 – 0 | FC Utrecht _{E} |

| HHC Hardenberg _{A} | 5 – 2 (a.e.t.) | VVSB _{A} |

27 September 2007

| AFC _{A} | 0 – 4 | FC Den Bosch _{1} |

| Elinkwijk _{A} | 1 – 5 | De Graafschap _{E} |

| SV Deurne _{A} | 3 – 0 | SV Meerssen _{A} |

| SC Cambuur _{1} | 1 – 0 | AZ _{E} |

| Stormvogels Telstar _{1} | 1 – 2 | Heracles Almelo _{E} |

| FC Twente _{E} | 1 – 2 (a.e.t.) | NEC _{E} |

_{E} Eredivisie; _{1} Eerste Divisie; _{A} Amateur teams

== Third round ==
30 October 2007

| Heracles Almelo | 3 – 0 | FC Omniworld |

| MVV | 1 – 3 | FC Dordrecht |

| HHC Hardenberg | 0 – 1 | AGOVV Apeldoorn |

| Fortuna Sittard | 1 – 3 | FC Den Bosch |

| FC Zwolle | 1 – 0 | Go Ahead Eagles |

| Cambuur Leeuwarden | 1 – 2 | Excelsior |

| FC Eindhoven | 1 – 3 (a.e.t.) | Haarlem |

| Roda JC | 3 – 2 (a.e.t.) | De Graafschap |

31 October 2007

| De Treffers | 1 – 5 | NEC |

| SV Deurne | 2 – 0 | VV UNA |

| RKSV Groene Ster | 1 – 2 | Quick Boys |

| RKC Waalwijk | 4 – 0 | BV Veendam |

| Sparta Rotterdam | 2 – 3 | NAC Breda |

| Ajax | 3 – 1 | sc Heerenveen |

1 November 2007

| ADO Den Haag | 1 – 3 | Young sc Heerenveen |

| Feyenoord | 3 – 1 | FC Groningen |

== Round of 16 ==
15 January 2008

| RKC Waalwijk | 1 – 1 (a.e.t.) 4 – 5 (p) | HFC Haarlem |

| SV Deurne | 0 – 4 | Feyenoord |

| FC Dordrecht | 4 – 3 (a.e.t.) | AGOVV Apeldoorn |

| Roda JC | 3 – 0 | Excelsior |

| NEC | 0 – 2 | FC Zwolle |

16 January 2008

| NAC Breda | 4 – 2 | Ajax |

| Heracles Almelo | 1 – 0 | FC Den Bosch |

| Quick Boys | 1 – 1 (a.e.t.) 3 – 1 (p) | Young sc Heerenveen |

== Quarter finals ==
26 February 2008

| HFC Haarlem | 1 – 5 | Heracles Almelo |

| FC Dordrecht | 1 – 3 | Roda JC |

27 February 2008

| Quick Boys | 0 – 3 | NAC Breda |

28 February 2008

| Feyenoord | 2 – 1 | FC Zwolle |

== Semi-finals ==
18 March 2008
20:45

| Feyenoord | 2 – 0 | NAC Breda |
|---|---|---|
| Mols 54'; Landzaat 75' |

De Kuip, Rotterdam
Attendance: 40,000
Referee: Pieter Vink

19 March 2008
20:45

| Heracles Almelo | 2 – 2 (a.e.t.) | Roda JC |
|---|---|---|
| García 17'; Van den Bergh 80' | | Meeuwis 18'; Janssen 55' |
Penalties
| Lakić (penalty missed); Maas (penalty scored); Schilder (penalty scored); Van den Bergh (penalty scored) | 3 – 5 | (penalty scored) Meeuwis; (penalty scored) Lamah; (penalty scored) De Fauw; (penalty scored) Janssen; (penalty scored) Cissé |

Polman Stadion, Almelo
Referee: Ben Haverkort

== Final ==
27 April 2008
18:00

| Feyenoord | 2–0 | Roda JC |
|---|---|---|
| Landzaat 8'; De Guzmán 36' |

De Kuip, Rotterdam
Referee: Jack van Hulten

Feyenoord played in the UEFA Cup.
