= Roy Stroeve =

Dutch footballer

Personal information
- Full name: Johannes Hermanus Roy Stroeve
- Date of birth: 15 May 1977 (age 49)
- Place of birth: Emmen, Netherlands
- Height: 1.78 m (5 ft 10 in)
- Position: Striker

Youth career
- Bargeres
- Emmen

Senior career*
Years	Team	Apps	(Gls)
1994–1999	Emmen	64	(17)
1999–2002	Sparta Rotterdam	21	(0)
2001–2002	→ Heracles Almelo (loan)	34	(17)
2002–2006	ADO Den Haag	125	(37)
2006–2010	Emmen	125	(39)
2010–2012	HHC Hardenberg	53	(15)
- * Club domestic league appearances and goals as of 16 March 2014 (UTC)

Johannes Hermanus Roy Stroeve (born 15 May 1977, in Emmen) is a former professional footballer. He previously played for FC Emmen, Sparta Rotterdam, Heracles Almelo, ADO Den Haag and HHC Hardenberg.
