= Niek Loohuis =

Dutch footballer (born 1986)

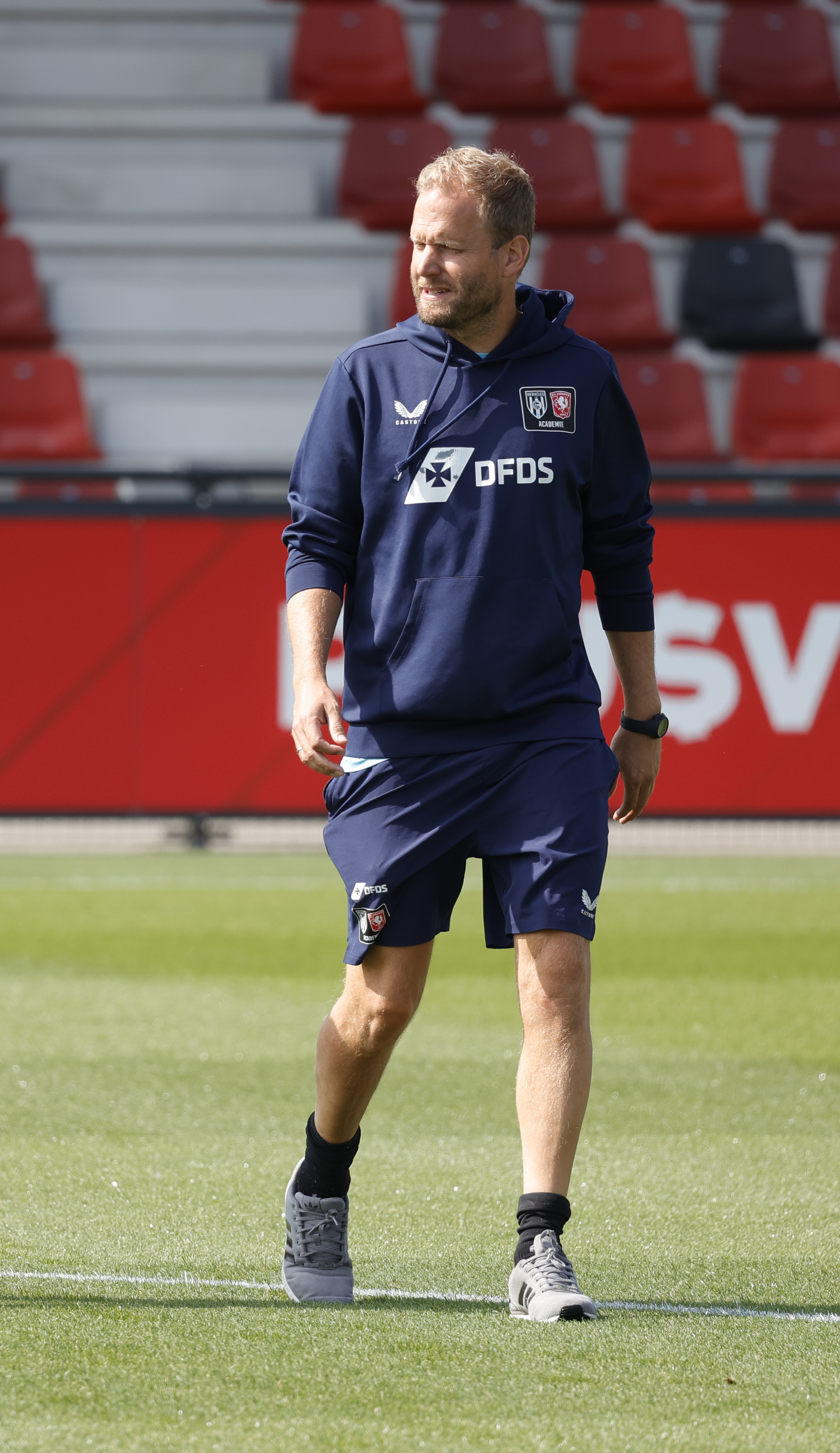

Personal information
- Date of birth: 25 April 1986 (age 40)
- Place of birth: Losser, Netherlands
- Height: 1.90 m (6 ft 3 in)
- Position: Midfielder

Youth career
- KVV Losser
- Quick '20
- BV Veendam

Senior career*
Years	Team	Apps	(Gls)
2005–2007	BV Veendam	52	(4)
2007–2008	SC Heerenveen	1	(0)
2008–2013	SC Veendam	110	(6)
Total		163	(10)

International career
2007	Netherlands U20	1	(0)
- * Club domestic league appearances and goals

Niek Loohuis (Dutch pronunciation: [ˈnik ˈloːɦœys], born 25 April 1986) is a Dutch former professional footballer who played as a midfielder for SC Veendam and SC Heerenveen.

== Career ==
Loohuis was born in Losser. He used to be a part of FC Twente's youth academy. The talent was declared unfit, for he did not meet the physical demands. Loohuis experienced growth problems and Twente had no other choice but to let him go. He went to amateur club Quick '20 in Oldenzaal where he played until the age of 18.

In Oldenzaal the youngster could play freely. Quick'20 played at the highest level of amateur football in the Netherlands at the time. Loohuis reckoned it was a good step in pursuing his dream of becoming a professional footballer. He got what he wanted. In 2005 two first division clubs showed interest: FC Emmen and BV Veendam. He chose the latter, where he played on amateur basis. A year and a half later he played 52 games for Veendam and scored four goals.

=== SC Heerenveen ===
His good performances did not go by unnoticed. Apart from Heerenveen, N.E.C., FC Groningen, Heracles Almelo and FC Twente showed interest in the talented midfielder. His sports agent Henk Nienhuis confirmed there were several scouts following him. Heerenveen immediately invited him to visit a match in the Abe Lenstra Stadium. He did not need much time to make his decision, and choose for Heerenveen.

What a beautiful stadium, what an incredible atmosphere! I very much would like to be a part of it.

— Niek Loohuis on his first impressions in the ALS

Gertjan Verbeek said Loohuis had made a lot of progress in one year. "Niek is a defensive midfielder that can also be used a centre-back. He is dynamical, has good stamina and has a "good head".

The twenty-year-old signed a three-year contract during the 2006/2007 winter transfer window with an option for another two years. The contract took effect in half a year later, meaning Loohuis could finish his season at the De Langeleegte, Veendam's home base.

== Style of play ==
Loohuis is often compared to Paul Bosvelt. Both men are hard-working players on the midfield (and occasionally in the defense), are good at passing the ball and will do anything not to lose. The young man himself hopes to improve his physical strength, his duel power and his agility.

Manager Gertjan Verbeek is known for his emphasis on physical power, exactly the point Loohuis wants to improve himself. He hopes to learn from Heerenveen's experienced players. Paul Bosvelt, now retired, is his idol.
