= 1989–90 KNVB Cup =

Tournament details
- Country: Netherlands
- Teams: 64

Final positions
- Champions: PSV
- Runners-up: Vitesse

Tournament statistics
- Top goal scorer: Harry van der Laan (5)

The 1989-90 KNVB Cup was the 72nd edition of the Dutch national football annual knockout tournament for the KNVB Cup. 64 teams contested, beginning on 2 September 1989 and ending at the final on 25 April 1990.

PSV beat Vitesse Arnhem 1–0 and won the cup for the sixth time.

== Teams ==
- All 18 participants of the 1989–90 Eredivisie, eight of which entering in the second round
- All 19 participants of the 1989–90 Eerste Divisie
- 27 teams from lower (amateur) leagues

== First round ==
The matches of the first round were played on 2-3 September 1989.

Home team	Result	Away team
HSC '21 _{A}	0–2	Willem II _{E}
IJsselmeervogels _{A}	1–5	FC Den Haag _{E} (at FC Den Haag)
Kozakken Boys _{A}	1–4	SC Heerenveen _{1}
SV Limburgia _{A}	1–3 (aet)	Helmond Sport _{1}
SV Marken _{A}	0–3	De Graafschap _{1}
RCH _{A}	0–5	Telstar _{1}
VV Rheden _{A}	0–6	Sparta _{E}
Rijnsburgse Boys _{A}	1–4	FC Wageningen _{1}
SC Genemuiden _{A}	2–4	VVV _{1}
SV Spakenburg _{A}	2–0	SC Heracles _{1}
TOP Oss _{A}	3–4	Excelsior _{1}
SV Venray _{A}	3–2 (aet)	AZ _{1}
WHC _{A}	1–4	Veendam _{1}

Home team	Result	Away team
Achilles 1894 _{A}	3–3 (p: 4–3)	Cambuur Leeuwarden _{1}
ACV _{A}	0–4	NAC Breda _{1}
ADO '20 _{A}	0–1	FC Eindhoven _{1}
AFC _{A}	2–2 (p: 2–4)	Vitesse Arnhem _{E}
AGOVV Apeldoorn _{A}	3–5	PEC Zwolle _{1}
Babberich _{A}	1–2	MVV _{E}
Blauw-Wit _{A}	1–2	NEC _{E}
SV de Valleivogels _{A}	1–3	FC Emmen _{1}
DHC Delft _{A}	0–4	RKC Waalwijk _{E}
DOS Kampen _{A}	1–10	FC Utrecht _{E}
DOVO _{A}	1–1 (p: 2–4)	Go Ahead Eagles _{1}
RKSV Halsteren _{A}	3–1	DS '79 _{1}
VV Heerjansdam_{A}	0–5	SVV _{1}
Hoogeveen _{A}	1–2	RBC _{1}

_{E} Eredivisie; _{1} Eerste Divisie; _{A} Amateur teams

=== Intermediary Round ===
There was only room for 32 teams in the next round, so this intermediary round was held on October 4, 1989.

Home team	Result	Away team
Go Ahead Eagles	1–2	Telstar
MVV	1–2	FC Wageningen
RBC	0–4	FC Den Haag
SV Spakenburg	3–2	De Graafschap
Sparta	2–3 (aet)	Helmond Sport

== Second round ==
The matches of the second round were played on December 8, 9, 10 and 13 1989. The ten highest ranked Eredivisie teams from last season entered the tournament this round.

Home team	Result	Away team
PEC Zwolle	0–1	Willem II
PSV _{E}	3–0	Veendam
SVV	5–1	Telstar
FC Wageningen	1–0	FC Utrecht
Achilles 1894	0–2	FC Volendam _{E}
FC Eindhoven	0–4	Ajax _{E}
SV Spakenburg	0–4	Feyenoord _{E} (at Rotterdam)
SV Venray	1–4	Roda JC _{E} (on Dec. 13)

Home team	Result	Away team
BVV Den Bosch _{E}	1–0 (aet)	VVV
FC Emmen	2–2 (p: 3–2)	RKC Waalwijk
FC Den Haag	2–3	FC Groningen _{E}
FC Twente _{E}	2–1	Helmond Sport
Fortuna Sittard _{E}	1–1 (p: 5–3)	sc Heerenveen
HFC Haarlem _{E}	0–3	Vitesse Arnhem
RKSV Halsteren	2–1 (aet)	NAC Breda
NEC	2–1	Excelsior

_{E} ten Eredivisie entrants

== Round of 16 ==
The matches of the round of 16 were played on January 13 and 14, 1990.

Home team	Result	Away team
FC Emmen	1–0	NEC
FC Twente	0–2	Ajax
SVV	0–4	Roda JC
Vitesse Arnhem	1–0	FC Groningen
FC Volendam	6–0	RKSV Halsteren
FC Wageningen	0–1	Fortuna Sittard
PSV	2–1	Feyenoord (on Jan. 17)
Willem II	1–0	BVV Den Bosch (on Feb. 7)

== Quarter finals ==
The quarter finals were played on February 14, 1990.

Home team	Result	Away team
Fortuna Sittard	0–1	Ajax
PSV	4–0	FC Emmen
Roda JC	1–1 (p)	Vitesse Arnhem
FC Volendam	0–1	Willem II

== Semi-finals ==
The semi-finals were played on March 14, 1990.

Home team	Result	Away team
PSV	2–2 (p: 4–2)	Ajax
Vitesse Arnhem	3–0	Willem II

== Final ==
25 April 1990

PSV	1–0	Vitesse
Valckx 75' (pen.)

De Kuip, Rotterdam
Attendance: 34,000
Referee: Mario van der Ende

PSV would participate in the Cup Winners' Cup.
