= 1987–88 Eerste Divisie =

32nd season of the second-tier football league in Netherlands

Eerste Divisie
- Season: 1987–88
- Champions: RKC
- Promoted: RKC; Veendam; MVV
- Goals: 1,053
- Average goals/game: 3.07

The Dutch Eerste Divisie in the 1987–88 season was contested by 19 teams. RKC won the championship.

== New entrants ==
Relegated from the 1986–87 Eredivisie

- Excelsior
- Go Ahead Eagles
- Veendam

== League standings ==
| Pos | Team | Pld | W | D | L | GF | GA | GD | Pts | Promotion or qualification |
|---|---|---|---|---|---|---|---|---|---|---|
| 1 | RKC | 36 | 31 | 3 | 2 | 104 | 30 | +74 | 65 | Promotion to Eredivisie |
| 2 | Veendam | 36 | 19 | 13 | 4 | 66 | 39 | +27 | 51 | Promotion to Eredivisie |
| 3 | MVV | 36 | 17 | 10 | 9 | 65 | 39 | +26 | 44 | Period champions |
| 4 | De Graafschap | 36 | 16 | 12 | 8 | 58 | 42 | +16 | 44 | Period champions |
| 5 | NEC | 36 | 17 | 8 | 11 | 68 | 51 | +17 | 42 | |
| 6 | Eindhoven | 36 | 14 | 12 | 10 | 58 | 47 | +11 | 40 | |
| 7 | RBC | 36 | 14 | 12 | 10 | 55 | 50 | +5 | 40 | Period champions |
| 8 | Excelsior | 36 | 14 | 10 | 12 | 48 | 42 | +6 | 38 | |
| 9 | Vitesse | 36 | 14 | 8 | 14 | 58 | 67 | −9 | 36 | Period champions |
| 10 | Heerenveen | 36 | 14 | 6 | 16 | 59 | 52 | +7 | 34 | |
| 11 | Cambuur | 36 | 11 | 12 | 13 | 55 | 57 | −2 | 34 | |
| 12 | Go Ahead Eagles | 36 | 11 | 12 | 13 | 49 | 51 | −2 | 34 | |
| 13 | Telstar | 36 | 14 | 6 | 16 | 61 | 71 | −10 | 34 | |
| 14 | Wageningen | 36 | 11 | 9 | 16 | 51 | 67 | −16 | 31 | |
| 15 | SVV | 36 | 11 | 7 | 18 | 57 | 72 | −15 | 29 | |
| 16 | Helmond Sport | 36 | 5 | 15 | 16 | 36 | 57 | −21 | 25 | |
| 17 | NAC | 36 | 9 | 7 | 20 | 45 | 69 | −24 | 25 | |
| 18 | Emmen | 36 | 5 | 12 | 19 | 29 | 59 | −30 | 22 | |
| 19 | Heracles | 36 | 5 | 6 | 25 | 31 | 91 | −60 | 16 | |

Source: rsssf.com

== Promotion competition ==
In the promotion competition, four period winners (the best teams during each of the four quarters of the regular competition) played for promotion to the eredivisie.

| Pos | Team | Pld | W | D | L | GF | GA | GD | Pts | Promotion |
|---|---|---|---|---|---|---|---|---|---|---|
| 1 | MVV | 6 | 5 | 0 | 1 | 17 | 6 | +11 | 10 | Promotion to Eredivisie |
| 2 | Vitesse | 6 | 2 | 1 | 3 | 10 | 14 | −4 | 5 | |
| 3 | RBC | 6 | 2 | 1 | 3 | 8 | 13 | −5 | 5 | |
| 4 | De Graafschap | 6 | 1 | 2 | 3 | 8 | 10 | −2 | 4 | |

Source: rsssf.com

== Attendances ==
| # | Club | Average |
|---|---|---|
| 1 | Cambuur | 5,281 |
| 2 | Veendam | 3,747 |
| 3 | De Graafschap | 3,644 |
| 4 | Heerenveen | 3,503 |
| 5 | RKC | 3,226 |
| 6 | MVV | 3,199 |
| 7 | Emmen | 2,241 |
| 8 | NAC | 2,212 |
| 9 | Wageningen | 2,208 |
| 10 | RBC | 2,189 |
| 11 | NEC | 2,000 |
| 12 | Eindhoven | 1,938 |
| 13 | Go Ahead | 1,589 |
| 14 | Telstar | 1,549 |
| 15 | Vitesse | 1,372 |
| 16 | Helmond | 1,333 |
| 17 | Heracles | 1,017 |
| 18 | Excelsior | 769 |
| 19 | SVV | 611 |

== See also ==
- 1987–88 Eredivisie
- 1987–88 KNVB Cup
