= 1988–89 KNVB Cup =

Tournament details
- Country: Netherlands
- Teams: 64

Final positions
- Champions: PSV
- Runners-up: FC Groningen

Tournament statistics
- Top goal scorer: Willem van der Ark (6)

The 1988-89 KNVB Cup was the 71st edition of the Dutch national football annual knockout tournament for the KNVB Cup. 64 teams contested, beginning on 1 October 1988 and ending at the final on 25 May 1989.

PSV beat FC Groningen 4–1 and won the cup for the fifth time.

== Teams ==
- All 18 participants of the Eredivisie 1988-89
- All 19 participants of the Eerste Divisie 1988-89
- 27 teams from lower (amateur) leagues

== First round ==
The matches of the first round were played on 1-2 October 1988.

Home team	Result	Away team
NSVV _{A}	1–4	FC Twente _{E}
VV OVV _{A}	0–4	BVV Den Bosch _{E}
Quick Boys _{A}	1–2	Fortuna Sittard _{E}
RCH _{A}	0–5	Feyenoord _{E}
VV Rheden _{A}	1–2	PSV _{E}
Rijnsburgse Boys _{A}	3–2	SC Cambuur _{1}
ROHDA Raalte _{A}	1–1 (p)	FC Den Haag _{1}
RVVH _{A}	0–7	MVV _{E}
SC Enschede _{A}	0–2	RBC _{1}
SC Heracles _{1}	2–3	FC Utrecht _{E}
SV Spakenburg _{A}	3–2	DS '79 _{1}
SVV _{1}	0–6	Ajax _{E}
TOP Oss _{A}	2–3 (aet)	Veendam _{E}
SV Venray _{A}	1–2	PEC Zwolle _{E}
VC Vlissingen _{A}	2–1	De Graafschap _{1}
VVOG _{A}	3–1	Excelsior _{1}

Home team	Result	Away team
ACV _{A}	1–3 (aet)	sc Heerenveen _{1}
VV Bennekom _{A}	1–2	FC Groningen _{E}
Blauw-Wit _{A}	1–0	Go Ahead Eagles _{1}
VV de Bataven _{A}	0–3	FC Wageningen _{1}
De Treffers _{A}	0–4	HFC Haarlem _{E}
DHC Delft _{A}	1–4	Vitesse Arnhem _{1}
DOS Kampen _{A}	0–4	AZ _{1}
VV DOVO _{A}	3–5	VVV _{E}
USV Elinkwijk _{A}	0–1	FC Eindhoven _{1}
FC Emmen _{1}	2–7	Willem II _{E}
Enter Vooruit _{A}	0–3	FC Volendam _{E}
VV Geldrop/AEK _{A}	2–5	Roda JC _{E}
Helmond Sport _{1}	2–0	NEC _{1}
IJsselmeervogels _{A}	0–2	RKC Waalwijk _{E}
TSV Longa _{A}	1–4	Sparta _{E}
NAC Breda _{1}	0–0 (p)	Telstar _{1}

_{E} Eredivisie; _{1} Eerste Divisie; _{A} Amateur teams

== Second round ==
The matches of the second round were played on November 18, 19 and 20, 1988.

Home team	Result	Away team
PSV	2–1	FC Volendam
Rijnsburgse Boys	2–4	Willem II
RKC Waalwijk	1–6	Feyenoord
SV Spakenburg	1–4	AZ
VC Vlissingen	2–0	BVV Den Bosch
VVOG	3–1 (aet)	Helmond Sport
VVV	3–4 (aet)	FC Groningen
FC Wageningen	1–5	Vitesse Arnhem

Home team	Result	Away team
Ajax	4–1	PEC Zwolle
Blauw-Wit	1–3	Sparta
FC Eindhoven	2–3 (aet)	Telstar
FC Den Haag	1–0	Roda JC
FC Twente	1–0	Veendam
FC Utrecht	5–0	RBC
Fortuna Sittard	(p) 1-1	HFC Haarlem
MVV	1–3	sc Heerenveen

== Round of 16 ==
The matches of the round of 16 were played between February 1 and 15, 1989.

Home team	Result	Away team
Ajax	2–1	FC Utrecht
AZ	2–1	Fortuna Sittard
FC Den Haag	3–2	Sparta
Feyenoord	0–2	Willem II
PSV	2–0	FC Twente
Telstar	0–2 (aet)	VC Vlissingen
Vitesse Arnhem	1–0	sc Heerenveen
VVOG	0–1	FC Groningen

== Quarter finals ==
The quarter finals were played between March 8 and March 15, 1989.

Home team	Result	Away team
VC Vlissingen	0–3	FC Den Haag (on Feb. 19)
AZ	0–2	PSV
FC Groningen	3–0	Ajax
Willem II	(p) 1-1	Vitesse Arnhem

== Semi-finals ==
The semi-finals were played on April 12, 1989.

Home team	Result	Away team
FC Groningen	5–1	Willem II
PSV	5–2	FC Den Haag

== Final ==
25 May 1989

PSV	4–1	Groningen
Romário 2'; Ellerman 45', 53'; Kieft 79'		Meijer 78'

De Kuip, Rotterdam
Attendance: 9,483
Referee: John Blankenstein

PSV also won the Dutch Eredivisie championship, thereby taking the double. They would participate in the European Cup, so finalists FC Groningen could play in the Cup Winners' Cup.
