= 1985–86 Eerste Divisie =

30th season of the second-tier football league in Netherlands

Eerste Divisie
- Season: 1985–86
- Champions: FC Den Haag
- Promoted: FC Den Haag; PEC Zwolle; SC Veendam
- Goals: 1,036
- Average goals/game: 3.02

The Dutch Eerste Divisie in the 1985–86 season was contested by 19 teams, one more than in the previous season. This was due to FC Emmen entering from the amateurs. FC Den Haag won the championship without losing a single match.

== New entrants ==
Entered from amateur football

- FC Emmen

Relegated from the 1984–85 Eredivisie

- NAC Breda
- PEC Zwolle
- FC Volendam

== League standings ==
Pos	Team	Pld	W	D	L	GF	GA	GD	Pts	Promotion or qualification
1	FC Den Haag	36	26	10	0	85	33	+52	62	Promoted to Eredivisie.
2	PEC Zwolle	36	21	9	6	71	31	+40	51	Promoted to Eredivisie.
3	RKC Waalwijk	36	17	11	8	67	51	+16	45	Qualified for Promotion play-off as Period champions.
4	SC Veendam	36	18	8	10	63	35	+28	44	Qualified for Promotion play-off as Period champions.
5	Willem II	36	15	12	9	63	48	+15	42	Qualified for Promotion play-off as Period champions.
6	Telstar	36	16	9	11	55	51	+4	41	
7	FC Volendam	36	14	12	10	62	55	+7	40	
8	Vitesse Arnhem	36	13	12	11	52	54	−2	38	Qualified for Promotion play-off as Period champions.
9	De Graafschap	36	10	13	13	57	62	−5	33	
10	RBC Roosendaal	36	13	7	16	52	58	−6	33	
11	SVV	36	11	11	14	59	68	−9	33	
12	Helmond Sport	36	11	10	15	52	58	−6	32	
13	NAC Breda	36	10	12	14	54	61	−7	32	
14	FC Wageningen	36	12	6	18	48	61	−13	30	
15	DS '79	36	8	13	15	44	61	−17	29	
16	FC Eindhoven	36	11	7	18	40	61	−21	29	
17	sc Heerenveen	36	8	11	17	50	66	−16	27	
18	FC Emmen	36	6	12	18	30	54	−24	24	
19	SC Cambuur	36	3	13	20	32	68	−36	19	

Source: rsssf.com

== Promotion competition ==
In the promotion competition, four period winners (the best teams during each of the four quarters of the regular competition) played for promotion to the eredivisie.

Pos	Team	Pld	W	D	L	GF	GA	GD	Pts	Promotion
1	SC Veendam	6	6	0	0	15	5	+10	12	Promoted to Eredivisie,
2	Willem II	6	3	1	2	8	5	+3	7	
3	RKC Waalwijk	6	1	1	4	12	13	−1	3	
4	Vitesse Arnhem	6	1	0	5	5	17	−12	2	

Source: rsssf.com

== Attendances ==
#	Club	Average
1	Den Haag	8,550
2	Heerenveen	4,011
3	Emmen	3,906
4	Willem II	3,728
5	De Graafschap	3,622
6	Veendam	3,525
7	Cambuur	3,386
8	Zwolle	3,337
9	NAC	2,857
10	Helmond	2,817
11	RKC	2,772
12	RBC	2,692
13	Volendam	2,350
14	Vitesse	2,306
15	Telstar	2,250
16	Wageningen	1,925
17	Eindhoven	1,689
18	SVV	1,436
19	DS '79	914

== See also ==
- 1985–86 Eredivisie
- 1985–86 KNVB Cup
