= 1988–89 Eerste Divisie =

33rd season of the second-tier football league in Netherlands

Eerste Divisie
- Season: 1988–89
- Champions: Vitesse Arnhem
- Promoted: Vitesse Arnhem; FC Den Haag; NEC
- Goals: 1,039
- Average goals/game: 3.03

The Dutch Eerste Divisie in the 1988–89 season was contested by 19 teams. Vitesse Arnhem won the championship.

== New entrants ==
Relegated from the 1987–88 Eredivisie

- AZ
- DS '79
- FC Den Haag

== League standings ==
Pos	Team	Pld	W	D	L	GF	GA	GD	Pts	Promotion or qualification
1	Vitesse Arnhem	36	23	8	5	61	20	+41	54	Promotion to Eredivisie
2	FC Den Haag	36	23	7	6	85	35	+50	53	Promotion to Eredivisie
3	Excelsior	36	20	9	7	62	35	+27	49	Period champions
4	NEC	36	21	6	9	72	40	+32	48	Period champions
5	AZ	36	19	9	8	80	42	+38	47	
6	sc Heerenveen	36	20	6	10	72	47	+25	46	Period champions
7	NAC Breda	36	16	11	9	61	49	+12	43	
8	SVV	36	14	9	13	50	52	−2	37	
9	De Graafschap	36	14	8	14	48	53	−5	36	
10	Go Ahead Eagles	36	13	8	15	52	50	+2	34	Period champions
11	SC Cambuur	36	13	8	15	47	57	−10	34	
12	SC Heracles	36	12	10	14	46	66	−20	34	
13	FC Eindhoven	36	11	7	18	45	53	−8	29	
14	Telstar	36	11	7	18	52	66	−14	29	
15	DS '79	36	12	4	20	55	66	−11	28	
16	Helmond Sport	36	5	14	17	39	69	−30	24	
17	RBC	36	7	7	22	32	65	−33	21	
18	FC Emmen	36	9	2	25	39	91	−52	20	
19	FC Wageningen	36	6	6	24	41	83	−42	18	

Source: rsssf.com

== Promotion competition ==
In the promotion competition, four period winners (the best teams during each of the four quarters of the regular competition) played for promotion to the eredivisie.

Pos	Team	Pld	W	D	L	GF	GA	GD	Pts	Promotion
1	NEC	6	4	2	0	9	3	+6	10	Promotion to Eredivisie
2	sc Heerenveen	6	3	2	1	12	5	+7	8	
3	Go Ahead Eagles	6	2	1	3	7	13	−6	5	
4	Excelsior	6	0	1	5	3	10	−7	1	

Source: rsssf.com

== Attendances ==
#	Club	Average
1	Heerenveen	4,656
2	Cambuur	4,008
3	Vitesse	3,892
4	NEC	3,722
5	ADO	3,453
6	AZ	3,432
7	NAC	3,408
8	De Graafschap	2,614
9	Excelsior	2,356
10	SVV	2,344
11	Go Ahead	2,228
12	Heracles	2,136
13	Eindhoven	1,792
14	Emmen	1,635
15	Telstar	1,415
16	Helmond	1,350
17	RBC	1,289
18	Wageningen	1,261
19	DS '79	760

== See also ==
- 1988–89 Eredivisie
- 1988–89 KNVB Cup
