= Tony McNulty (footballer) =

English footballer

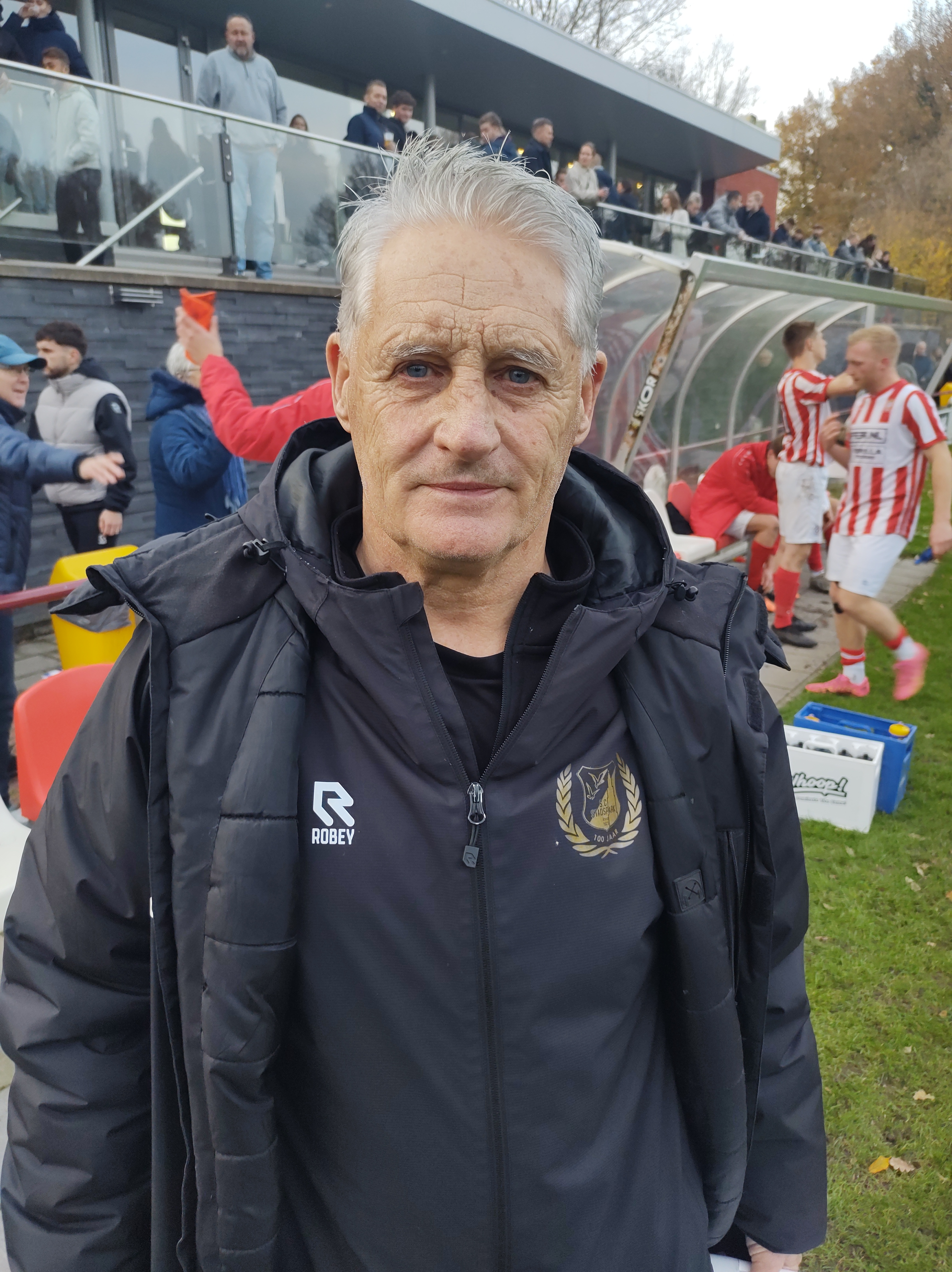
- McNulty in 2024.

Personal information
- Date of birth: 6 March 1957 (age 69)
- Place of birth: Liverpool, England
- Position: Forward

Senior career*
Years	Team	Apps	(Gls)
- Veendam
1984	Twente	14	(1)
- De Graafschap
1986–1987	Zwolle	31	(2)
Total		45	(3)
- * Club domestic league appearances and goals

Tony McNulty (born 6 March 1957) is an English former professional footballer who played as a forward, active in the Netherlands in the 1980s.

== Career ==
Born in Liverpool, McNulty played for Veendam before moving to Twente in 1984. He then moved on to De Graafschap, and later played for Zwolle.

He later became an agent.
