= 1989–90 Eerste Divisie =

34th season of the second-tier football league in Netherlands

Eerste Divisie
- Season: 1989–90
- Champions: SVV
- Promoted: SVV; sc Heerenveen
- Goals: 927
- Average goals/game: 2.71
- Top goalscorer: Peter van Velzen; 24 goals

The Dutch Eerste Divisie in the 1989–90 season was contested by 19 teams. Schiedamse Voetbal Vereniging (SVV) won the championship.

== New play-off system ==
From this year onwards, only one club promoted directly to the Eredivisie, instead of two. Also, one of the Eredivisie-clubs (the number 16 of 18) now had a chance to avert relegation. Promotion was no longer certain for the runner-up of the Eerste Divisie. A new and expanded play-off system was introduced. The following teams entered:
Group round
Six entrants would play in two groups of three teams.

- 4 period champions (the best teams during each of the four quarters of the regular competition)
- 2 best placed teams in the league (not being league or period champion)

The two group winners: play-off 1. Losers: remain in Eerste Divisie
Play-off 1

- The two group winners from the group round.

Winners: promoted to the Eredivisie. Losers: play-off 2.
Play-off 2

- The losers of play-off 1
- The numbers 16 from the Eredivisie (the numbers 17 and 18 already relegated directly)

Winners: Eredivisie. Losers: Eerste Divisie.

== New entrants ==
Relegated from the 1988–89 Eredivisie

- PEC Zwolle
- Veendam
- VVV-Venlo

== League standings ==
Pos	Team	Pld	W	D	L	GF	GA	GD	Pts	Promotion or qualification
1	SVV	36	26	6	4	67	21	+46	58	Promotion to Eredivisie
2	NAC Breda	36	16	11	9	55	39	+16	43	Play-offs
3	SC Heracles	36	17	8	11	42	42	0	42	Play-offs
4	VVV-Venlo	36	12	15	9	53	44	+9	39	
5	FC Eindhoven	36	14	11	11	63	56	+7	39	
6	FC Emmen	36	13	12	11	53	47	+6	38	Play-offs
7	De Graafschap	36	13	12	11	52	47	+5	38	
8	Veendam	36	14	10	12	46	48	−2	38	
9	Go Ahead Eagles	36	15	7	14	55	50	+5	37	Play-offs
10	FC Wageningen	36	11	13	12	44	49	−5	35	Play-offs
11	Cambuur Leeuwarden	36	11	12	13	44	49	−5	34	
12	AZ	36	12	9	15	48	46	+2	33	
13	Helmond Sport	36	12	9	15	49	55	−6	33	
14	Excelsior	36	10	13	13	47	53	−6	33	
15	PEC Zwolle	36	9	14	13	34	36	−2	32	
16	sc Heerenveen	36	12	8	16	49	53	−4	32	Play-offs
17	RBC	36	10	12	14	39	46	−7	32	
18	Telstar	36	8	10	18	46	71	−25	26	
19	DS '79	36	6	10	20	41	75	−34	22	

Source: rsssf.com

== Promotion/relegation play-offs ==
The promotion/relegation play-offs consisted of three rounds. In the group round, four period winners (the best teams during each of the four quarters of the regular competition) and two (other) best placed teams in the league, played in two groups of three teams. The group winners would play in play-off 1. The winners of that play-off would be promoted to the Eredivisie, the loser had to take on the number 16 of the Eredivisie in play-off 2. These two teams played for the third and last position in the Eredivisie of next season.

Group 1
Pos	Team	Pld	W	D	L	GF	GA	GD	Pts	Qualification
1	sc Heerenveen	4	2	0	2	7	6	+1	4	Play-off 1
2	Go Ahead Eagles	4	2	0	2	7	7	0	4	
3	NAC Breda	4	2	0	2	6	7	−1	4	

Source: rsssf.com

Group 2
Pos	Team	Pld	W	D	L	GF	GA	GD	Pts	Qualification
1	FC Emmen	4	3	0	1	7	5	+2	6	Play-off 1
2	FC Wageningen	4	1	2	1	5	3	+2	4	
3	SC Heracles	4	0	2	2	2	6	−4	2	

Source: rsssf.com

Play-off 1

Team 1	Agg.	Team 2	1st leg	2nd leg
FC Emmen	1-2	sc Heerenveen	1-0	0-2

sc Heerenveen: promoted to Eredivisie
FC Emmen: play-off 2

Play-off 2

Team 1	Agg.	Team 2	1st leg	2nd leg
FC Emmen	1-2	NEC	1-2	0-0

NEC Nijmegen: remain in Eredivisie
FC Emmen: remain in Eerste Divisie

== Attendances ==
#	Club	Average
1	NAC	5,191
2	Cambuur	4,300
3	SVV	3,977
4	VVV	3,797
5	Heerenveen	3,794
6	AZ	3,168
7	Heracles	3,125
8	Emmen	2,979
9	Wageningen	2,696
10	Veendam	2,378
11	Helmond	2,278
12	De Graafschap	2,222
13	Zwolle	2,014
14	Eindhoven	1,900
15	RBC	1,767
16	Go Ahead	1,594
17	Telstar	1,541
18	Excelsior	1,208
19	DS '79	718

== See also ==
- 1989–90 Eredivisie
- 1989–90 KNVB Cup
