= 1931–32 Netherlands Football League Championship =

Netherl. Football Championship
- Season: 1931–1932
- Champions: AFC Ajax (4th title)

The Netherlands Football League Championship 1931–1932 was contested by 50 teams participating in five divisions. The national champion would be determined by a play-off featuring the winners of the eastern, northern, southern and two western football divisions of the Netherlands. AFC Ajax won this year's championship by beating Feijenoord, SC Enschede, PSV Eindhoven and Veendam.

== New entrants ==
Eerste Klasse North:

- Promoted from 2nd Division: FVC

Eerste Klasse South:

- Promoted from 2nd Division: Bleijerheide

Eerste Klasse West-I:

- Moving in from West-II: HVV Den Haag, KFC, RCH and Sparta Rotterdam
- Promoted from 2nd Division: West Frisia

Eerste Klasse West-II:

- Moving in from West-I: DFC, Koninklijke HFC, VUC and ZFC
- Promoted from 2nd Division: Xerxes

== Divisions ==
=== Eerste Klasse East ===
Pos	Team	Pld	W	D	L	GF	GA	GD	Pts	Qualification or relegation
1	SC Enschede	18	13	1	4	41	13	+28	27	Qualified for Championship play-off
2	Go Ahead	18	12	2	4	46	20	+26	26	
3	AGOVV Apeldoorn	18	10	2	6	57	39	+18	22	
4	PEC Zwolle	18	9	2	7	34	40	−6	20	
5	Heracles	18	7	5	6	34	37	−3	19	
6	Vitesse Arnhem	18	8	2	8	36	44	−8	18	
7	Robur et Velocitas	18	6	2	10	38	49	−11	14	
8	FC Wageningen	18	5	3	10	31	44	−13	13	
9	HVV Tubantia	18	5	2	11	38	45	−7	12	
10	ZAC	18	3	3	12	21	45	−24	9	Relegated to 2nd Division

Source: rsssf.com

=== Eerste Klasse North ===
Pos	Team	Pld	W	D	L	GF	GA	GD	Pts	Qualification or relegation
1	Veendam	18	16	1	1	61	19	+42	33	Qualified for Championship play-off
2	Velocitas 1897	18	16	0	2	100	20	+80	32	
3	GVAV Rapiditas	18	6	7	5	55	52	+3	19	
4	VV Leeuwarden	18	7	5	6	45	45	0	19	
5	Be Quick 1887	18	6	4	8	42	49	−7	16	
6	LAC Frisia 1883	18	6	1	11	42	66	−24	13	
7	LVV Friesland	18	6	1	11	31	71	−40	13	
8	Achilles 1894	18	4	4	10	36	45	−9	12	
9	MVV Alcides	18	5	2	11	38	57	−19	12	
10	FVC	18	3	5	10	32	58	−26	11	Relegated to 2nd Division

Source: rsssf.com

=== Eerste Klasse South ===
Pos	Team	Pld	W	D	L	GF	GA	GD	Pts	Qualification or relegation
1	PSV Eindhoven	18	12	2	4	54	32	+22	26	Qualified for Championship play-off
2	FC Eindhoven	18	12	0	6	45	31	+14	24	
3	NAC	18	11	2	5	46	34	+12	24	
4	NOAD	18	7	5	6	44	42	+2	19	
5	MVV Maastricht	18	8	3	7	43	43	0	19	
6	Willem II	18	7	1	10	46	38	+8	15	
7	LONGA	18	5	4	9	39	40	−1	14	
8	BVV Den Bosch	18	6	1	11	48	58	−10	13	
9	Bleijerheide	18	4	5	9	28	39	−11	13	
10	De Valk	18	6	1	11	30	66	−36	13	Relegated to 2nd Division

Source: rsssf.com

=== Eerste Klasse West-I ===
Pos	Team	Pld	W	D	L	GF	GA	GD	Pts	Qualification or relegation
1	AFC Ajax	18	13	3	2	75	31	+44	29	Qualified for Championship play-off Division West-II next season
2	RCH	18	11	1	6	53	42	+11	23	
3	KFC	18	8	3	7	43	40	+3	19	Division West-II next season
4	West Frisia	18	6	7	5	51	47	+4	19	Division West-II next season
5	Hermes DVS	18	6	4	8	35	41	−6	16	
6	Sparta Rotterdam	18	6	4	8	33	46	−13	16	Division West-II next season
7	Stormvogels	18	6	3	9	42	44	−2	15	Division West-II next season
8	HBS Craeyenhout	18	5	5	8	44	50	−6	15	
9	HVV 't Gooi	18	6	3	9	41	54	−13	15	
10	HVV Den Haag	18	4	5	9	42	64	−22	13	Relegated to 2nd Division

Source: rsssf.com

=== Eerste Klasse West-II ===
Pos	Team	Pld	W	D	L	GF	GA	GD	Pts	Qualification or relegation
1	Feijenoord	19	13	1	5	45	32	+13	27	Qualified for Championship play-off Division West-I next season
2	ZFC	19	11	3	5	49	33	+16	25	Division West-I next season
3	DFC	18	11	1	6	48	30	+18	23	
4	VSV	18	10	3	5	36	34	+2	23	Division West-I next season
5	Blauw-Wit Amsterdam	18	6	6	6	42	38	+4	18	
6	FC Hilversum	18	8	1	9	41	44	−3	17	Division West-I next season
7	VUC	18	5	4	9	37	41	−4	14	
8	ADO Den Haag	18	6	2	10	35	43	−8	14	Division West-I next season
9	Xerxes	18	5	3	10	29	44	−15	13	
10	Koninklijke HFC	18	3	2	13	24	47	−23	8	Relegated to 2nd Division

Source: rsssf.com

=== Championship play-off ===
Pos	Team	Pld	W	D	L	GF	GA	GD	Pts	AJA	FEY	ENS	PSV	VEE
1	AFC Ajax	8	6	1	1	31	11	+20	13		1–3	3–1	3–0	4–0
2	Feijenoord	8	5	2	1	28	11	+17	12	2–4		2–2	6–0	8–1
3	SC Enschede	8	3	3	2	18	15	+3	9	3–3	1–2		5–2	3–1
4	PSV Eindhoven	8	1	2	5	10	22	−12	4	1–4	0–0	2–2		0–2
5	Veendam	8	1	0	7	7	35	−28	2	1–9	2–5	0–1	0–5	

Source: rsssf.com
