= Sixto Rovina =

Netherlands Antilles footballer

Personal information
- Date of birth: 10 January 1961
- Place of birth: Willemstad, Netherlands Antilles
- Date of death: 7 February 1989 (aged 28)
- Place of death: Gasselte, Netherlands
- Position: Midfielder

Senior career*
Years	Team	Apps	(Gls)
–1985	RKV FC Sithoc		
1985	→ Undeba (guest)		
1985–1988	FC Eindhoven		
1988–1989	Groningen	2	(0)

International career
- Netherlands Antilles
- * Club domestic league appearances and goals

Sixto Rovina (10 January 1961 – 7 February 1989) was a Netherlands Antilles international footballer who played as a midfielder. He died after suffering a heart attack in a friendly game against VV Hoogezand.

== Career statistics ==
=== Club ===
Club	Season	League			Cup		Other		Total	
Club	Season	Division	Apps	Goals	Apps	Goals	Apps	Goals	Apps	Goals
Groningen	1988–89	Eredivisie	2	0	0	0	0	0	2	0
Career total			2	0	0	0	0	0	2	0
