= Ted Immers =

Dutch footballer (1941–2024)

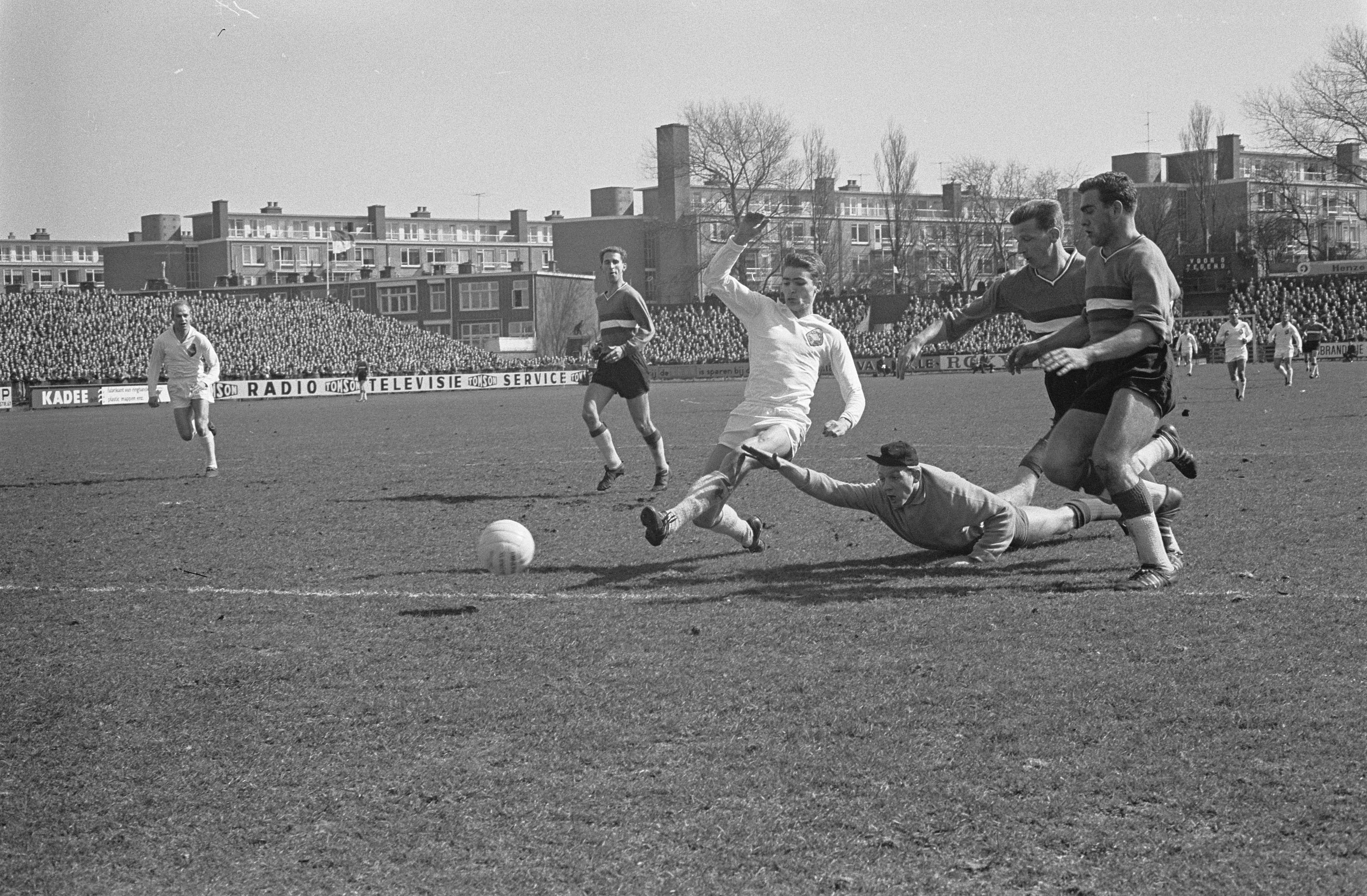
- Immers (in white) scoring for Telstar in 1964

Personal information
- Date of birth: 31 March 1941
- Place of birth: Haarlem, German-occupied Netherlands
- Date of death: 14 March 2024 (aged 82)
- Place of death: Haarlem, Netherlands
- Position: Midfielder

Senior career*
Years	Team	Apps	(Gls)
1960–1963	VSV		
1963–1965	Telstar		
1965-	SC Gooiland		

Managerial career
- 1986–1988: FC Eindhoven
- 1988–1989: SC Heerenveen
- 1990–1991: HFC Haarlem
- 1996–1998: FC Lisse
- 1999–2002: Koninklijke HFC
- * Club domestic league appearances and goals

Ted Immers (31 March 1941 – 14 March 2024) was a Dutch footballer who played as a midfielder. He later managed several clubs.

== Career ==
Immers played as a midfielder with VSV (1960–1963) and Telstar (1963–1965) among others in the 1964–65 Eredivisie. He was the manager of FC Eindhoven (1986–1988), SC Heerenveen (1988–1989) and HFC Haarlem (1990–1991). With Koninklijke HFC he became champion for two consecutive seasons. In 1989, there were reports of him possibly going to De Graafschap or a team in Turkey.

== Personal life and death ==
Immers was the father of actor and singer Tim Immers. After a long illness, Immers died on 14 March 2024 in Haarlem, his hometown. He was 82.
