= Huub de Leeuw =

Dutch footballer (1910–1983)

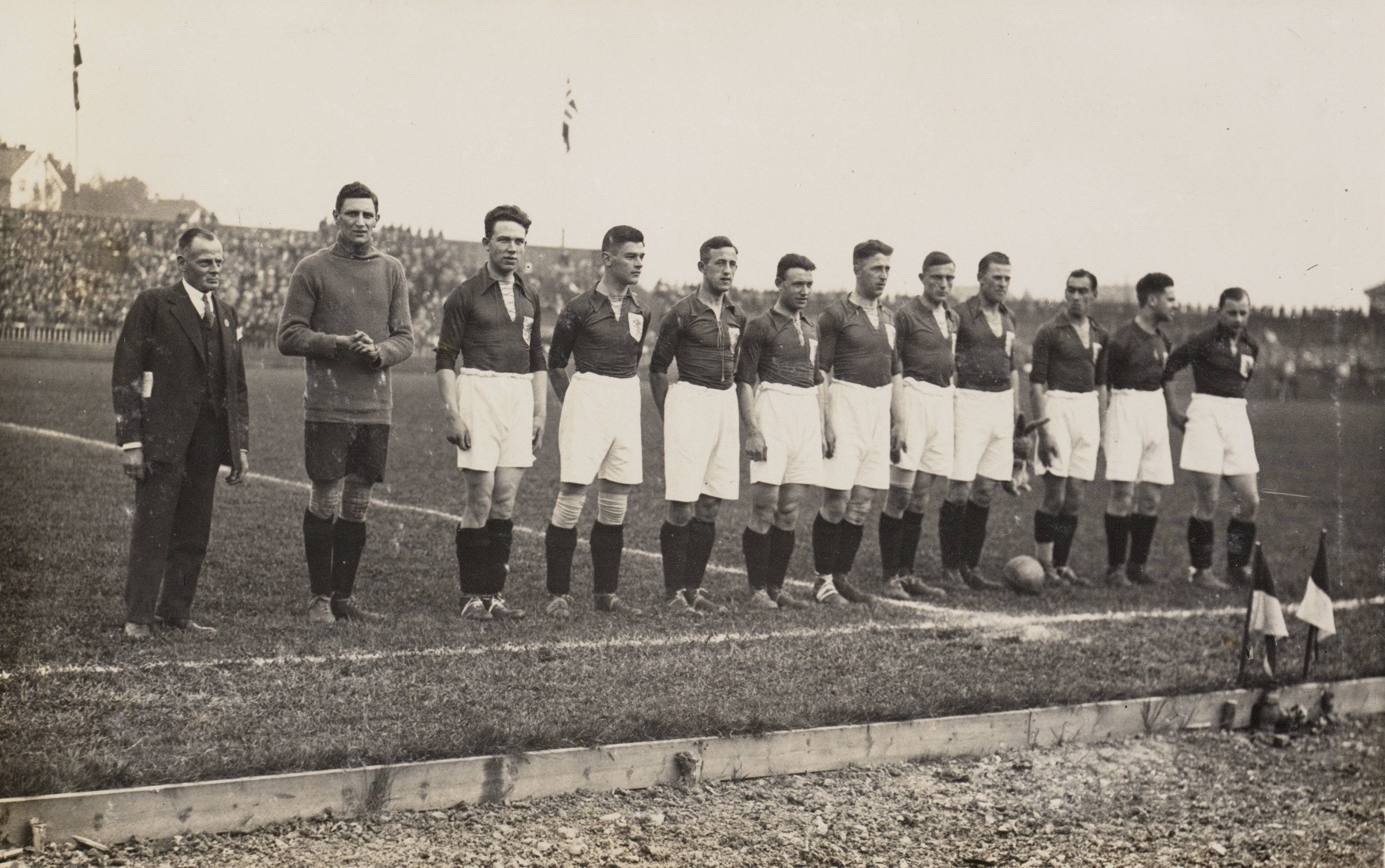
- De Leeuw (4th from right) w. Dutch national team (1929)

Personal information
- Date of birth: 15 April 1910
- Date of death: 30 June 1983 (aged 73)
- Position: Midfielder

Senior career*
| Years | Team | Apps | (Gls) |
- Willem II

International career
| 1929 | Netherlands | 2 | (0) |

Managerial career
- PSV Eindhoven
- SC Eindhoven
- * Club domestic league appearances and goals

Huub de Leeuw (15 April 1910 – 30 June 1983) was a Dutch footballer who played as a midfielder for Willem II. He made two appearances for the Netherlands national team in 1929.
