= Wim Groenendijk =

Dutch footballer (1910–1977)

Personal information
- Full name: Willem Huibrecht Groenendijk
- Date of birth: 14 August 1910
- Place of birth: Rotterdam, Netherlands
- Date of death: 27 November 1977 (aged 67)
- Place of death: Nijmegen, Netherlands
- Position: Forward

Youth career
- De Musschen

Senior career*
Years	Team	Apps	(Gls)
1926-1937	Feijenoord		

International career
1930	Netherlands	1	(0)

Managerial career
- 1945–1948: MVV
- 1950–1957: Eindhoven
- 1957–1958: Elinkwijk
- 1958–1960: NEC
- 1961–1964: Quick 1888
- 1964–1966: De Treffers
- 1968–1971: Quick 1888
- * Club domestic league appearances and goals

Wim Groenendijk (14 August 1910 – 27 November 1977) was a Dutch football player and manager who played as a forward. He made one appearance for the Netherlands national team in 1930.

Groenendijk started playing for hometown club De Musschen and scored 4 goals for Feijenoord in the 1935 KNVB Cup Final against HVV Helmond, a record that still stands in 2026.

After retiring as a player, Groenendijk coached several amateur sides and managed to win Eindhoven their only league title in 1954. He was also manager of NEC and died of a heart attack in the stands of the Goffertstadion during a match.
