= Jacques de Wit =

Dutch football player and manager (1932–2023)

Personal information
- Date of birth: 2 September 1932 (age 94)
- Place of birth: Valkenswaard, Netherlands
- Date of death: 15 February 2023 (aged 90)
- Place of death: Valkenswaard, Netherlands
- Position: Forward

Senior career*
Years	Team	Apps	(Gls)
1958–1958	PSV Eindhoven	24	(3)

Managerial career
- 1963–1966: FC Eindhoven
- 1966–1968: Dordrechtsche FC
- 1968–1972: Helmond Sport
- 1972–1973: Club Brugge (assistant)
- 1973–1974: Club Brugge
- 1974–1975: Anderlecht (assistant)
- 1978–1979: Helmond Sport
- 1979–1982: FC Eindhoven
- 1989–1990: FC Eindhoven
- 1990–1991: Royal Antwerp
- 1997: Overpelt (caretaker)
- * Club domestic league appearances and goals

Jacques de Wit (born 2 September 1932 – 15 February 2023) was a Dutch professional football player and manager. He played as a forward during his playing career.
