= Dick Snoek =

Dutch footballer (1926–2002)

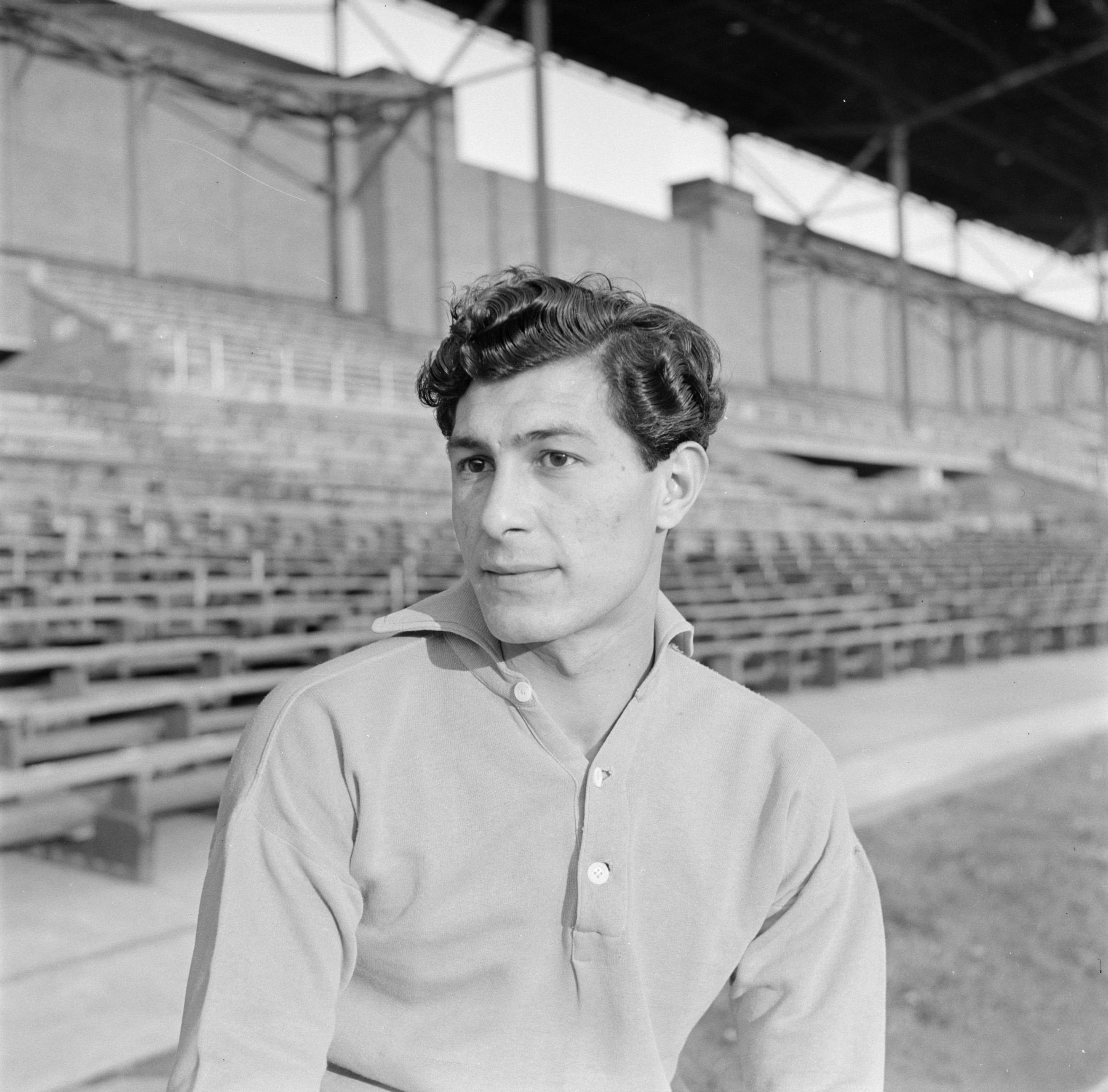
- Snoek (1951)

Personal information
- Full name: Dirk Jan Snoek
- Date of birth: 4 April 1926
- Date of death: 16 November 2002 (aged 76)
- Position: Forward

Senior career*
| Years | Team | Apps | (Gls) |
- SC Eindhoven

International career
| 1950–1951 | Netherlands | 3 | (0) |
- * Club domestic league appearances and goals

Dirk Jan Snoek (4 April 1926 – 16 November 2002) was a Dutch footballer who played as a forward for SC Eindhoven. He made three appearances for the Netherlands national team from 1950 to 1951.
