= Frans Tebak =

Dutch footballer (1927–2002)

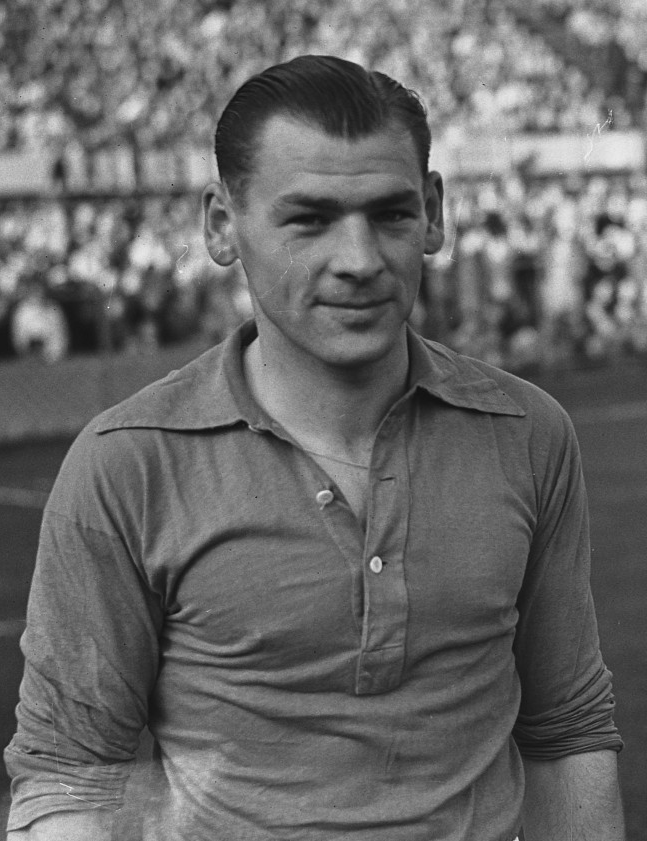
- Tebak in 1952

Personal information
- Full name: Franciscus Antonius Maria Tebak
- Date of birth: 20 September 1927
- Place of birth: Eindhoven, Netherlands
- Date of death: 8 August 2002 (aged 74)
- Position: Defender

Senior career*
Years	Team	Apps	(Gls)
- PSV Eindhoven
- SC Eindhoven

International career
1952–1954	Netherlands	10	(0)
- * Club domestic league appearances and goals

Franciscus Antonius Maria Tebak (20 September 1927 – 8 August 2002) was a Dutch footballer who played as a defender for PSV Eindhoven and SC Eindhoven. He made ten appearances for the Netherlands national team from 1952 to 1954.
