= Harris Huizingh =

Dutch footballer (born 1963)

Personal information
- Date of birth: 10 February 1963 (age 63)
- Place of birth: Ter Apel, Netherlands
- Position: Striker

Youth career
- 1971-1975: STA
- 1979-1982: STA

Senior career*
Years	Team	Apps	(Gls)
1983–1986	Groningen	32	(7)
1986–1990	Veendam	123	(30)
1990–1999	Groningen	227	(44)
1999–2001	Heerenveen	37	(3)
Total		419	(84)

Managerial career
- 2009–2011: Veendam (assistant)
- 2010–2011: Mussel
- 2011–2014: SJS
- 2014–2017: Valthermond
- * Club domestic league appearances and goals

Harris Huizingh (born 10 February 1963) is a Dutch retired footballer who played as a forward.

== Career ==
Huizingh was born in Ter Apel. On 29 April 1984, he made his debut in the first team for FC Groningen, during a 4–0 victory against Sparta Rotterdam. However, it was not until the season after when he was 22 years old did he get a permanent starting place in the 1985–86 season from trainer Han Berger. Thanks to his good technique, he quickly received the nickname The Wizard of Ter Apel. He made an impression during his first season, but to the surprise of many, Huizingh left for BV Veendam after that season. Berger's successor, Rob Jacobs, did not think Huizingh was good enough.

After four years in which the club was relegated twice and promoted once, Huizingh signed for FC Groningen again in 1990. That season, the club, with Hans Westerhof as trainer, finished third in the Eredivisie. After the 1990–91 season, Leo Beenhakker wanted to bring Huizingh to Ajax, but Groningen did not want to let him go. They asked for a high transfer fee and Ajax dropped out of the transfer. In the years that followed Huizingh increasingly suffered from injuries.

After the 1998–99 season, Huizingh left Groningen. He was already 36 years old, but was signed by SC Heerenveen who went on to be runners-up until he league. Consequently, a year later, he became the second-oldest player to ever play in the UEFA Champions League. After two seasons with Heerenveen, Huizingh quit playing football.

He went on to coach many amateur teams in his local region, like SJS and Valthermond, whom he quit due to his work at the police in Assen.
