= 1956–57 Tweede Divisie =

Tweede Divisie
- Season: 1956–57
- Champions: Leeuwarden; RBC
- Promoted: Leeuwarden; RBC
- Goals scored: 1,700
- Average goals/game: 4.05

The Dutch Tweede Divisie in the 1956–57 season was contested by 30 teams, divided in two groups. It was the first season of the new lowest tier of Dutch professional football, organised by the Royal Dutch Football Association (KNVB). Teams could not be relegated to amateur football. RBC and Leeuwarden won the championship and were promoted to the Eerste Divisie.

The composition of the league was based on the results of the previous season. The teams that had finished lowest in the Dutch amateur Eerste Klasse would play in this new league. Teams that finished higher, would start in the Eerste Divisie.

The league had been divided in two, with a Tweede Divisie A and a Tweede Divisie B, each comprising 15 teams. Teams from the Tweede Divisie A were roughly from the north and east of the Netherlands, teams from the Tweede Divisie B roughly from the west and south.

== Tweede Divisie A ==
Pos	Team	Pld	W	D	L	GF	GA	GD	Pts	Promotion
1	VV Leeuwarden	28	19	5	4	95	40	+55	43	Promoted to Eerste Divisie
2	VV Rheden	28	16	7	5	64	46	+18	39	
3	SC Heracles	28	15	7	6	58	29	+29	37	
4	Veendam	28	13	9	6	64	53	+11	35	
5	Be Quick 1887	28	12	6	10	68	43	+25	30	
6	HVV Tubantia	28	10	9	9	47	42	+5	29	
7	VV Oldenzaal	28	8	11	9	51	57	−6	27	
8	SC Heerenveen	28	9	9	10	56	64	−8	27	
9	Velocitas 1897	28	10	4	14	53	78	−25	24	
10	PEC	28	10	3	15	61	83	−22	23	
11	Zwolsche Boys	28	9	4	15	52	59	−7	22	
12	Oosterparkers	28	10	2	16	49	73	−24	22	
13	Go Ahead	28	8	5	15	50	59	−9	21	
14	VV Zwartemeer	28	6	9	13	47	75	−28	21	
15	Enschedese Boys	28	7	6	15	42	56	−14	20	

Source: rsssf.com

== Tweede Divisie B ==
Pos	Team	Pld	W	D	L	GF	GA	GD	Pts	Promotion or relegation
1	RBC	28	18	7	3	66	26	+40	43	Promoted to Eerste Divisie
2	ZFC	28	19	3	6	83	37	+46	41	
3	LONGA	28	16	5	7	56	33	+23	37	
4	VV Baronie	28	14	5	9	59	63	−4	33	
5	FC Hilversum	28	12	8	8	63	49	+14	32	
6	HVV 't Gooi	28	10	11	7	63	42	+21	31	
7	SV Zeist	28	10	7	11	51	57	−6	27	
8	DHC Delft	28	10	7	11	48	58	−10	27	
9	UVS	28	9	7	12	65	56	+9	25	
10	NEC	28	10	4	14	60	58	+2	24	Moving to other group (Note: Actually, NEC was the only team not moving, as the groups would change (B would become A, A would become B) next season.)
11	RKVV Wilhelmina	28	7	10	11	35	48	−13	24	
12	SV DOSKO	28	8	8	12	47	70	−23	24	
13	ONA	28	8	7	13	55	77	−22	23	
14	De Valk	28	6	3	19	52	81	−29	15	
15	TOP Oss	28	3	8	17	42	90	−48	14	Voluntarily returned to amateur football

Source: rsssf.com

== See also ==
- 1956–57 Eredivisie
- 1956–57 Eerste Divisie
