= De Langeleegte =

Stadium in Veendam, Netherlands

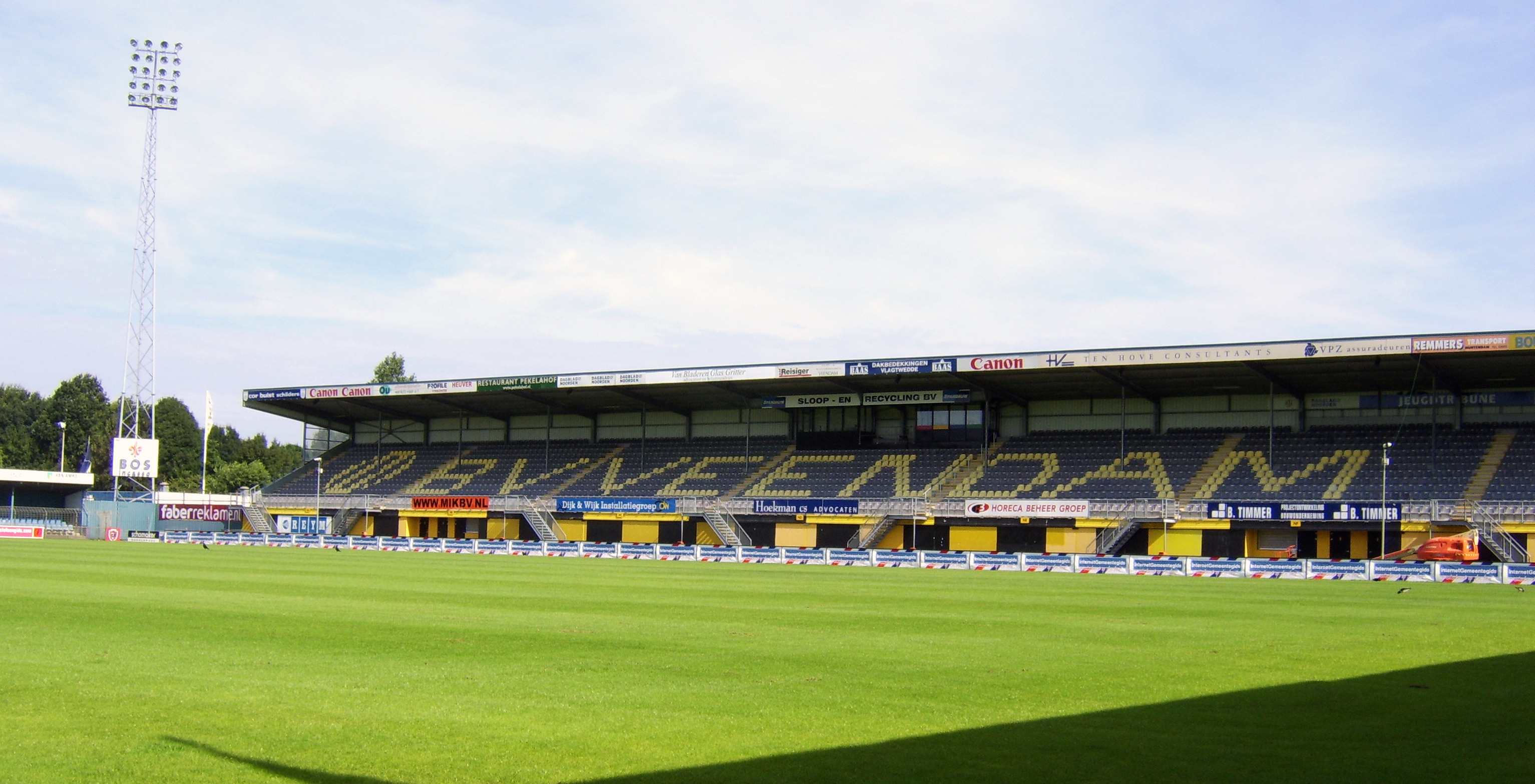
- Stadium in 2007

- Location in the province of Groningen in the Netherlands
- Location: Veendam, Netherlands
- Coordinates: 53°6′31″N 6°51′52″E
- Capacity: 6,500
- Event: Multi-purpose stadium

Construction
- Built: 1954
- Renovated: 1998

Tenant
- SC Veendam (1954–2013)

De Langeleegte (Dutch pronunciation: [də ˈlɑŋəleːxtə]) is a multi-use stadium in Veendam, Netherlands. It was the home ground of football club SC Veendam from 1954 until their dissolvement in 2013. Since then, it has been in use for football matches at amateur and youth international level.

The stadium has a capacity of 6,500 people and was built in 1954, with major renovations taking place in 1998. In 2018, the name was changed to Henk Nienhuis Stadium.
