= FC Eindhoven =

Dutch association football club

- Full name: Football Club Eindhoven
- Nickname: Blauw-Witten (Blue-Whites)
- Founded: 16 November 1909; 117 years ago
- Ground: Jan Louwers Stadion, Eindhoven
- Capacity: 4,200
- Chairman: Marc Burgers
- Head coach: Jan Poortvliet
- League: Eerste Divisie
- 2025–26: Eerste Divisie, 11th of 20
- Website: fc-eindhoven.nl
Home colours	Away colours

Football Club Eindhoven, commonly known as FC Eindhoven, is a professional football club based in Eindhoven, NED, that competes in the Eerste Divisie, the second tier of Dutch football. They are one of two professional clubs which are based in the city of Eindhoven, the other one being PSV.

FC Eindhoven play their home games at Jan Louwers Stadion, in the southern part of the city. The club's official colours are blue and white, hence their nickname "Blauw-Witten" (lit. 'The Blue-Whites').

== History ==
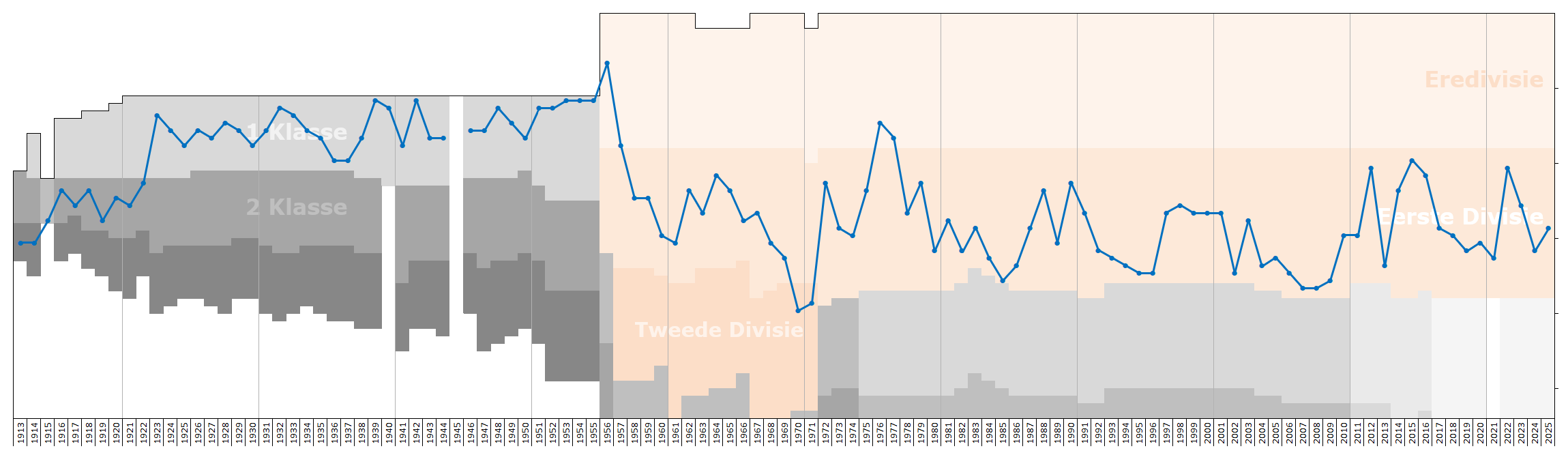
Historical chart of league performance

The club was founded on 16 November 1909 as E.V.V. It came from the fusion of Sparta and Eindhovia. It was decided to form a new club called E.V.V. (short for Eindhovense Voetbal Vereniging). The club colours were blue and white, the blue stemming from the crest of Eindhoven at that time. E.V.V. started to play in the Brabantse Voetbalbond, a regional league, but after a couple of years joined the NVB, the National League. In 1921 E.V.V. fused with Gestel (local team) and changed its name to E.V.V. Eindhoven. At the end of the 30s, the club had its first success winning as the Dutch Cup, the KNVB Beker, in 1937. In 1939, E.V.V. Eindhoven were champions of the 1st Division Region South and played for the title of The Netherlands with teams like DWS, NEC, Ajax and Achilles 1894. They finished fourth.

In 1950, E.V.V. Eindhoven had their first Dutch international in Noud van Melis. Frans Tebak and Dick Snoek were to quickly follow in his footsteps. In 1954, E.V.V. Eindhoven were the last Dutch league champions before the introduction of the professional league. After turning professional in 1954, the club played in the Eredivisie until 1957, when they were relegated to the Eerste Divisie. In 1969, they were even relegated to the Tweede Divisie. Two years later, the club secured promotion back to the Eerste Divisie, and in 1975, to the Eredivisie. In 1977, E.V.V. Eindhoven were relegated back to the Eerste Divisie, where they have remained ever since. In 1997, E.V.V. Eindhoven moved from a professional club back to an amateur club. A new professional club SBV Eindhoven (Stichting Betaald Voetbal Eindhoven) was founded, and in 2002 changed its name to FC Eindhoven.

In the 2009–10 season, FC Eindhoven qualified for playoffs to advance to the Eredivisie. They advanced past the first round defeating AGOVV Apeldoorn 4–2 on aggregate. After that, they were pitted against relegation candidate Willem II and were defeated 3–2 on aggregate. In the 2011-12 season, FC Eindhoven finished third, despite Ernest Faber leaving the club to join Dick Advocaat at PSV as his assistant in March 2012. The club lost 3–0 to Helmond Sport over two legs, 1–0 in the first and 2–0 in the second, in the second round of the promotion playoffs.

Erwin Koeman, the replacement of Ernest Faber, left in the summer of 2012 and was replaced by John Lammers. Under Lammers the 2012–13 season finished in a disappointing 16th spot, only above two sides whose points totals had been set at zero due to bankruptcy. The 2013–14 season was a big improvement with the club finishing sixth and qualifying for the promotion play-offs. There they encountered Sparta Rotterdam and lost 3–1 on aggregate.

Results improved over the next two seasons culminating in a 2nd place finish in the 2014-15 season, but losing the promotion playoffs. The club had another chance at promotion a season later, but failed again. The club then had a period of worse results, finishing 11th, 12th, and 14th in the next 3 seasons. In the 2019-20 season, FC Eindhoven were 13th when competition was halted due to the COVID-19 pandemic. The next season they finished 15th, before an improvement in the 2021-22 season saw the club finish 3rd and play for promotion, losing in the first round 1-4 on aggregate to Almere City. Results worsened again as the club achieved 8th and 14th in the next 2 seasons before an improvement in the 2024-25 season to 11th.

== Rivalries ==
FC Eindhoven's former biggest rivalry is with neighbours PSV Eindhoven, against whom they contest the Lichtstad Derby ('City of Light Derby'). However, the clubs have not faced each other in league competition since the 1976–77 season. FC Eindhoven used to be a bigger club than PSV in the period between 1930 and 1955. PSV was a club for the workers of Phillips and seen as a club for the privileged while FC Eindhoven was seen as the people's club. In 2004, FC Eindhoven contracted a co-operation deal with neighbours PSV Eindhoven, meaning the possibility of swapping youth players between the two clubs.

Nowadays, Helmond Sport are seen as the biggest rivals. The clubs are about 15 km apart and have been playing in the same league for years.

== Honours ==
- Eredivisie
  - Winner: 1954
- KNVB Cup
  - Winner: 1937
- Promoted to Eredivisie
  - Promotion: 1975
- Promoted to Eerste Divisie
  - Promotion: 1971

== Results ==
Below is a table with FC Eindhoven's domestic results since the introduction of professional football in 1956.

Domestic Results since 1956
Domestic league	League result	Qualification to	KNVB Cup season	Cup result
2025–26 Eerste Divisie	11th	–	2025–26	first round
2024–25 Eerste Divisie	11th	–	2024–25	second round
2023–24 Eerste Divisie	14th	–	2023–24	second round
2022–23 Eerste Divisie	8th	promotion/relegation play-offs: no promotion	2022–23	second round
2021–22 Eerste Divisie	3rd	promotion/relegation play-offs: no promotion	2021–22	first round
2020–21 Eerste Divisie	15th	–	2020–21	first round
2019–20 Eerste Divisie	13th	–	2019–20	round of 16
2018–19 Eerste Divisie	14th	–	2018–19	first round
2017–18 Eerste Divisie	12th	–	2017–18	second round
2016–17 Eerste Divisie	11th	–	2016–17	second round
2015–16 Eerste Divisie	4th	promotion/relegation play-offs: no promotion	2015–16	second round
2014–15 Eerste Divisie	2nd	promotion/relegation play-offs: no promotion	2014–15	second round
2013–14 Eerste Divisie	6th	promotion/relegation play-offs: no promotion	2013–14	third round
2012–13 Eerste Divisie	16th	–	2012–13	third round
2011–12 Eerste Divisie	3rd	promotion/relegation play-offs: no promotion	2011–12	round of 16
2010–11 Eerste Divisie	12th	–	2010–11	fourth round
2009–10 Eerste Divisie	12th	promotion/relegation play-offs: no promotion	2009–10	second round
2008–09 Eerste Divisie	18th	–	2008–09	third round
2007–08 Eerste Divisie	19th	–	2007–08	third round
2006–07 Eerste Divisie	19th	–	2006–07	third round
2005–06 Eerste Divisie	17th	–	2005–06	round of 16
2004–05 Eerste Divisie	15th	–	2004–05	second round
2003–04 Eerste Divisie	16th	–	2003–04	third round
2002–03 Eerste Divisie	10th	–	2002–03	second round
2001–02 Eerste Divisie	17th	–	2001–02	third round
2000–01 Eerste Divisie	9th	–	2000–01	third round
1999–2000 Eerste Divisie	9th	–	1999–2000	round of 16
1998–99 Eerste Divisie	9th	–	1998–99	quarter-final
1997–98 Eerste Divisie	8th	promotion/relegation play-offs: no promotion	1997–98	second round
1996–97 Eerste Divisie	9th	–	1996–97	second round
1995–96 Eerste Divisie	17th	–	1995–96	group stage
1994–95 Eerste Divisie	17th	–	1994–95	second round
1993–94 Eerste Divisie	16th	–	1993–94	second round
1992–93 Eerste Divisie	15th	–	1992–93	second round
1991–92 Eerste Divisie	14th	promotion/relegation play-offs: no promotion	1991–92	round of 16
1990–91 Eerste Divisie	9th	promotion/relegation play-offs: no promotion	1990–91	second round
1989–90 Eerste Divisie	5th	–	1989–90	second round
1988–89 Eerste Divisie	13th	–	1988–89	second round
1987–88 Eerste Divisie	6th	–	1987–88	second round
1986–87 Eerste Divisie	11th	–	1986–87	first round
1985–86 Eerste Divisie	16th	–	1985–86	first round
1984–85 Eerste Divisie	18th	–	1984–85	first round
1983–84 Eerste Divisie	15th	–	1983–84	first round
1982–83 Eerste Divisie	11th	–	1982–83	first round
1981–82 Eerste Divisie	14th	–	1981–82	first round
1980–81 Eerste Divisie	10th	–	1980–81	first round
1979–80 Eerste Divisie	14th	–	1979–80	second round
1978–79 Eerste Divisie	5th	–	1978–79	second round
1977–78 Eerste Divisie	9th	–	1977–78	round of 16
1976–77 Eredivisie	17th	Eerste Divisie (relegation)	1976–77	second round
1975–76 Eredivisie	15th	–	1975–76	semi-final
1974–75 Eerste Divisie	6th	Eredivisie (winning promotion competition)	1974–75	first round
1973–74 Eerste Divisie	12th	–	1973–74	first round
1972–73 Eerste Divisie	11th	–	1972–73	first round
1971–72 Eerste Divisie	5th	–	1971–72	first round
1970–71 Tweede Divisie	3rd	Eerste Divisie (promotion)	1970–71	first round
1969–70 Tweede Divisie	4th	–	1969–70	first round
1968–69 Eerste Divisie	15th	Tweede Divisie (losing relegation play-off)	1968–69	first round
1967–68 Eerste Divisie	13th	–	1967–68	group stage
1966–67 Eerste Divisie	9th	–	1966–67	first round
1965–66 Eerste Divisie	10th	–	1965–66	group stage
1964–65 Eerste Divisie	6th	–	1964–65	first round
1963–64 Eerste Divisie	4th	–	1963–64	round of 16
1962–63 Eerste Divisie	9th	–	1962–63	quarter-final
1961–62 Eerste Divisie	6th (group A)	–	1961–62	?
1960–61 Eerste Divisie	13th (group B)	–	1960–61	?
1959–60 Eerste Divisie	12th (group B)	–	not held	not held
1958–59 Eerste Divisie	7th (group A)	–	1958–59	?
1957–58 Eerste Divisie	7th (group B)	–	1957–58	?
1956–57 Eredivisie	18th	Eerste Divisie (relegation)	1956–57	?

== Current squad ==
As of 16 October 2026

Note: Flags indicate national team as defined under FIFA eligibility rules; some limited exceptions apply. Players may hold more than one non-FIFA nationality.

No.	Pos.	Nation	Player
1	GK	NED	Jort Borgmans
2	DF	NED	Tyrese Simons
4	DF	NED	Junior Poortvliet (on loan from Willem II)
5	DF	NED	Rens Boon
6	MF	NED	Guus Beaumont
7	FW	NED	Hugo Deenen
8	MF	BEL	Xander Blomme
9	FW	NED	Kevin van Veen (captain)
10	MF	DEN	Lasse Abildgaard (on loan from Willem II)
11	MF	NED	Mika de Jonge
13	FW	NED	Amir Bryson
14	MF	NED	Niek Munsters
15	MF	NED	Zakaria Haddaoui
16	DF	BEL	Bram Rovers
17	DF	NED	Luc Netten
18	MF	CRO	Antonio Baždarić (on loan from Trenčín)

No.	Pos.	Nation	Player
19	FW	NED	Siegert Baartmans (on loan from Willem II)
20	DF	NED	Raf van de Riet
21	FW	NED	Akin Ozcan
22	DF	NED	Clint Essers
23	DF	NED	Ryan Meijer
25	MF	NED	Lennon Smulders
27	MF	NED	Emre Eksi
28	FW	BEL	Rayan Buifrahi
29	DF	NED	Hyman Ali
30	GK	CUW	Nino Fancito
31	GK	NED	Niek Janssen
32	FW	NED	Milan Hoek
35	DF	NED	Jens Elbers
44	DF	NED	Owen Renfrum
77	FW	NED	Vicente Besuijen

== Former players ==
=== National team players ===
The following players were called up to represent their national teams in international football and received caps during their tenure with FC Eindhoven:

- Azerbaijan
  - (Azerbaijan) Ozan Kökçü (2022–2024)
  Canada
  - (Canada) Charles-Andreas Brym (2021–2022; 2022–2023)
  Curaçao
  - (Curaçao) Rangelo Janga (2024–present)
  - (Curaçao) Sixto Rovina (1985–1988) (Note: A Curaçao-born footballer, Sixto Rovina represented Netherlands Antilles internationally, prior to the countries dissolution in 2010, with Curaçao considered by both UEFA and FIFA as the only inherit successor to the national team of former Netherlands Antilles.)
  - (Curaçao) Ayrton Statie (2016)
- El Salvador
  - (El Salvador) Enrico Hernández (2021)
  Jamaica
  - (Jamaica) Marlon van de Wetering (2025–2026)
- Netherlands
  - (Netherlands) Noud van Melis (1946–1954; 1958–1960)
  - (Netherlands) Dick Snoek (1950–1954; 1954–1960)
  - (Netherlands) Frans Tebak (1946–1963)

- Players in bold actively play for FC Eindhoven and for their respective national teams. Years in brackets indicate careerspan with FC Eindhoven.

=== National team players by Confederation ===
Member associations are listed in order of most to least amount of current and former FC Eindhoven players represented Internationally

Total national team players by confederation
Confederation	Total	(Nation) Association
AFC	0	
CAF	0	
CONCACAF	6	Curaçao (3), Canada (1), El Salvador (1), Jamaica (1)
CONMEBOL	0	
OFC	0	
UEFA	4	Netherlands (3), Azerbaijan (1)

== Players in international tournaments ==
The following is a list of FC Eindhoven players who have competed in international tournaments, including the CONCACAF Gold Cup. To this date no FC Eindhoven players have participated in the FIFA World Cup, UEFA European Championship, Africa Cup of Nations, Copa América, AFC Asian Cup or the OFC Nations Cup while playing for FC Eindhoven.

Cup	Players
(United States) (Canada) 2023 CONCACAF Gold Cup	(Canada) Charles-Andreas Brym

== Club officials ==
As of 18 December 2024

Position	Staff
Chairman	(Netherlands) Juul van Hout
Chief Executive Officer	(Belgium) Günther Peeters
Technical director	(Netherlands) Marc Scheepers
Team Manager	(Netherlands) Tom van der Leegte (Netherlands) Paul Schreuder
Head coach	(Netherlands) Maurice Verberne
Assistant coach	(Netherlands) Bastiaan Riemersma (Netherlands) Mike van Dijk
Goalkeeping coach	(Netherlands) Hans Segers
Club doctor	(Netherlands) Paul Schreuder
Physiotherapist	(Netherlands) Frank Hagenaars (Netherlands) Thomas Hooyberghs (Hungary) Fanni Oláh (Netherlands) Marco Subnel
Equipment manager	(Netherlands) Lydia van den Heuvel (Netherlands) Werner Rossou

== Managers ==
- A. Wynperle (1924–25)
- R.W. Jefferson (1925–28)
- J. Pilcik (1928–32)
- D. James (1933–35)
- Otto Pinter (1935–39)
- Wim van Tuijl (1939–49)
- Jan van de Gevel (1949–50)
- Wim Groenendijk (1950–56)
- Wim Groenendijk & T. de Zeeuw (1956–57)
- Layos Todt & T. de Zeeuw (1957–58)
- Huub de Leeuw (1958–60)
- Jan Bijl (1960–63)
- (Netherlands) Jacques de Wit (1963–66)
- Ludwig Gorissen (1966–67)
- (Netherlands) Hennie Hollink (1967–68)
- (Netherlands) Joep Brandes & Bram Appel (1968–70)
- (England) Les Talbot (1970–72)
- Hans Alleman (1972–73)
- (Netherlands) Rinus Gosens (1973–79)
- (Netherlands) Jacques de Wit (1979–82)
- (Netherlands) Ad Versluis (1982–84)
- (Netherlands) Th.Ramakers & G.van Berlo (1984–85)
- Jo Jansen (1985–86)
- Ted Immers (1986–88)
- (Netherlands) Rinus Gosens (1988–89)
- (Netherlands) Jacques de Wit (1989–90)
- (Netherlands) Mario Verlijsdonk (1990–91)
- (Netherlands) Chris Dekker (1991–92)
- (Netherlands) Piet Buter (1992–93)
- (Hungary) Sandor Popovics & Mario Verlijsdonk (1993–94)
- Rob Jacobs (1994–95)
- Rob Jacobs & Mario Verlijsdonk (1995–96)
- Willem Leushuis (1997–2000)
- (Belgium) Jos Daerden (2000–01)
- (Netherlands) Leon Vlemmings (2001–05)
- (Netherlands) Louis Coolen (2005–07)
- (Netherlands) Ernest Faber (2007)
- (Netherlands) Gerald Vanenburg (2008)
- (Netherlands) Ernest Faber (2008)
- (Belgium) Marc Brys (2008–09)
- (Netherlands) Jan Poortvliet (2009–10)
- (Netherlands) Ernest Faber (2010–12)
- (Netherlands) Erwin Koeman (2012)
- (Netherlands) John Lammers (2012)
- (Netherlands) Pascal Maas (2012–13)
- (Netherlands) Jean-Paul de Jong (2013–15)
- (Netherlands) Mitchell van der Gaag (2015–16)
- (Netherlands) Ricardo Moniz (2016–17)
- (Netherlands) Wilfred van Leeuwen (2017–18)
- (Netherlands) David Nascimento (2018–19)
- (Netherlands) Ernie Brandts (2019–21)
- (Netherlands) Rob Penders (2021–23)
- (Netherlands) Willem Weijs (2023–24)
- (Netherlands) Maurice Verberne (2024–25)
- (Netherlands) Jan Poortvliet (2025–present)
