= 1989–90 Eredivisie =

34th season of the Eredivisie

Eredivisie
- Season: 1989–90
- Champions: Ajax (23rd title)
- Promoted: Vitesse Arnhem; FC Den Haag; NEC
- Relegated: BVV Den Bosch; HFC Haarlem
- Cup Winners' Cup: PSV
- UEFA Cup: FC Twente; Vitesse Arnhem; Roda JC
- Goals: 842
- Average goals/game: 2.75
- Top goalscorer: (Brazil) Romário; PSV 23 goals

The Dutch Eredivisie in the 1989–90 season was contested by 18 teams. Ajax won the championship.

== League standings ==
Pos	Team	Pld	W	D	L	GF	GA	GD	Pts	Qualification or relegation
1	Ajax (C)	34	19	11	4	67	23	+44	49	Banned from European Cup (Note: Ajax did not qualify for the European Cup. On September 27, 1989, Austrian goalkeeper Franz Wohlfahrt was hit and injured by a bar, thrown by a home supporter at an Ajax-Austria Wien UEFA Cup match. Ajax subsequently were banned from European competition for a year.)
2	PSV (Note: Winners of the 1989–90 KNVB Cup)	34	20	8	6	94	36	+58	48	Qualification to Cup Winners' Cup first round
3	FC Twente	34	16	10	8	48	43	+5	42	Qualification to UEFA Cup first round
4	Vitesse Arnhem	34	15	11	8	49	31	+18	41	Qualification to UEFA Cup first round
5	Roda JC	34	14	13	7	53	39	+14	41	Qualification to UEFA Cup first round
6	FC Volendam	34	15	9	10	43	38	+5	39	
7	Fortuna Sittard	34	12	14	8	42	35	+7	38	
8	RKC Waalwijk	34	13	11	10	45	47	−2	37	
9	FC Groningen	34	10	15	9	50	46	+4	35	
10	FC Den Haag	34	13	7	14	58	63	−5	33	
11	Feyenoord	34	9	13	12	51	45	+6	31	
12	Sparta	34	12	7	15	51	61	−10	31	
13	Willem II	34	7	13	14	42	49	−7	27	
14	FC Utrecht	34	8	11	15	27	45	−18	27	
15	MVV	34	7	13	14	38	61	−23	27	
16	NEC	34	5	16	13	32	55	−23	26	Qualification to Relegation play-offs (Note: NEC remain in the Eredivisie after winning the promotion/relegation play-offs)
17	FC Den Bosch (R)	34	6	13	15	30	51	−21	25	Relegation to Eerste Divisie
18	HFC Haarlem (R)	34	4	7	23	22	74	−52	15	Relegation to Eerste Divisie

Source: rsssf.com
(C) Champions; (R) Relegated

== Results ==
Home \ Away	AJA	DBO	FEY	FOR	GRO	DHA	HFC	MVV	NEC	PSV	RKC	RJC	SPA	TWE	UTR	VIT	VOL	WIL
Ajax	—	6–0	1–1	1–0	3–2	1–0	5–0	5–0	3–0	3–2	0–0	2–2	1–2	4–0	3–0	5–2	0–0	1–0
Den Bosch	0–1	—	1–1	1–1	0–0	0–1	1–0	0–3	1–0	1–1	1–2	1–1	3–0	4–2	2–0	1–2	0–0	1–1
Feyenoord	0–1	2–0	—	0–2	3–3	0–2	5–0	2–0	2–1	4–0	5–0	2–2	6–1	2–3	0–0	0–0	1–1	4–1
Fortuna Sittard	0–0	2–0	1–1	—	0–0	2–1	1–0	1–1	1–1	4–1	1–1	1–1	2–1	2–3	1–0	0–0	4–1	3–0
Groningen	0–1	0–0	3–3	0–0	—	2–1	3–3	5–2	1–1	0–0	1–2	1–1	2–2	5–0	2–0	3–1	3–0	1–1
FC Den Haag	0–4	3–1	2–0	4–1	2–2	—	6–1	6–1	2–2	1–5	1–1	1–3	1–0	3–1	1–1	2–1	2–1	0–3
Haarlem	0–4	2–0	3–1	0–3	0–1	1–2	—	1–1	1–1	0–2	0–2	0–0	0–4	0–1	1–2	0–2	2–1	0–2
MVV	1–0	3–0	1–1	1–1	1–3	3–0	1–1	—	2–0	0–1	3–0	1–1	1–2	0–0	0–0	1–5	0–1	2–1
NEC	1–1	2–2	0–0	1–0	1–1	3–3	3–1	0–0	—	1–4	2–1	0–1	1–2	2–2	0–0	0–4	2–2	2–2
PSV Eindhoven	2–0	1–1	1–1	2–0	2–0	9–2	4–0	8–1	6–0	—	4–0	3–4	9–1	1–1	1–0	0–1	2–2	2–1
RKC	0–3	1–1	3–0	3–1	3–1	3–2	1–0	1–1	3–1	0–3	—	3–1	3–0	0–0	3–3	0–1	1–1	2–2
Roda	1–1	0–3	2–0	0–1	1–1	3–1	5–0	3–2	0–0	3–1	3–0	—	1–1	2–0	1–0	0–1	2–1	4–1
Sparta Rotterdam	1–2	4–2	2–2	4–1	3–0	3–1	0–1	2–2	1–2	0–4	2–1	3–1	—	3–0	0–1	1–1	2–0	1–1
Twente	2–1	4–1	1–0	1–1	4–1	1–0	2–2	3–0	2–1	0–0	0–1	1–1	2–0	—	3–1	1–1	1–0	2–0
Utrecht	0–0	1–1	3–0	0–1	1–0	2–1	0–0	0–0	3–0	1–7	1–1	0–1	2–1	1–2	—	1–2	0–3	2–1
Vitesse	1–1	0–0	2–1	1–1	0–1	1–1	4–0	2–1	0–0	0–2	1–1	2–0	2–1	1–2	5–1	—	0–1	2–0
Volendam	2–2	3–0	2–0	2–2	1–2	0–2	1–0	4–1	1–0	0–0	1–0	2–0	2–0	2–1	1–0	1–0	—	2–1
Willem II	1–1	1–0	0–1	2–0	3–0	1–1	3–2	1–1	0–1	3–4	0–2	2–2	1–1	0–0	0–0	1–1	5–1	—

Legend: Blue = home team win; Yellow = draw; Red = away team win.

== Promotion/relegation play-offs ==
Starting this season, the number 16 of the Eredivisie would play against relegation against the runners-up of the promotion/relegation play-offs of the Eerste Divisie. The Eerste Divisie league champions and winner of the play-offs would replace the numbers 17 and 18 of this league directly. See here for details of the system.

Team 1	Agg.	Team 2	1st leg	2nd leg
Emmen	1-2	NEC	1-2	0-0

NEC: remain in Eredivisie
Emmen: remain in Eerste Divisie

== See also ==
- 1989–90 Eerste Divisie
- 1989–90 KNVB Cup
