= Henk Nienhuis =

Dutch footballer (1941–2017)

Personal information
- Full name: Hendrik Evert Nienhuis
- Date of birth: 11 August 1941
- Place of birth: Nieuw-Buinen, Netherlands
- Date of death: 18 February 2017 (aged 75)
- Place of death: Veendam, Netherlands
- Position: Midfielder

Youth career
- VV Nieuw Buinen

Senior career*
Years	Team	Apps	(Gls)
1963–1973	Veendam	283	(22)

Managerial career
- 1984–1989: BV Veendam
- 1993–1994: BV Veendam
- * Club domestic league appearances and goals

Henk Nienhuis (11 August 1941 – 18 February 2017) was a Dutch footballer and manager. He spent the major part of his career at BV Veendam, hence his nickname Mister Veendam.

== Playing career ==
Nienhuis played in midfield for BV Veendam from 1963 to 1973, after joining them from hometown amateur side Nieuw Buinen. He made his debut for Veendam on 25 August 1963 against Excelsior.

He attracted interest from Feyenoord and was called up for Netherlands U-21 in November 1964, only for a severe injury to spoil his chances.

== Managerial career ==
Nienhuis managed Veendam during the second half of the eighties, clinching promotion with them to the Eredivisie twice. He later worked as a director at the club, as he did at FC Groningen.

== Personal life ==
He was honoured as a Knight of the Order of Orange-Nassau in 2000 for his services to football in the Netherlands. His son Evert-Jan also played for Veendam.

Nienhuis died in February 2017 of prostate cancer. Stadium De Langeleegte was renamed Henk Nienhuis stadium in his honour.
