= 1986–87 Eredivisie =

31st season of the Eredivisie

Eredivisie
- Season: 1986–87
- Champions: PSV (9th title)
- Promoted: PEC Zwolle; FC Den Haag; SC Veendam
- Relegated: Go Ahead Eagles; SC Veendam; Excelsior
- European Cup: PSV
- Cup Winners' Cup: Ajax; FC Den Haag
- UEFA Cup: Feyenoord; FC Utrecht
- Goals: 917
- Average goals/game: 2.99
- Top goalscorer: (Netherlands) Marco van Basten; Ajax 31 goals

The Dutch Eredivisie in the 1986–87 season was contested by 18 teams. PSV Eindhoven won the championship. At the beginning of the season, AZ '67 from Alkmaar changed their name to AZ.

== League standings ==
Pos	Team	Pld	W	D	L	GF	GA	GD	Pts	Qualification or relegation
1	PSV	34	27	5	2	99	21	+78	59	European Cup
2	Ajax	34	25	3	6	92	30	+62	53	Cup Winners' Cup (Note: Ajax won the Cup Winners' Cup tournament of this year, so two (instead of one) Dutch teams were allowed to participate in next year's edition: cupholders Ajax and the winner of the KNVB Cup. Since Ajax also won the KNVB Cup, finalists FC Den Haag would be the second participants in Cup Winners' Cup next year.)
3	Feyenoord	34	15	12	7	73	43	+30	42	UEFA Cup
4	Roda JC	34	15	9	10	51	45	+6	39	Play-offs UEFA Cup
5	VVV	34	10	17	7	46	45	+1	37	Play-offs UEFA Cup
6	FC Utrecht	34	15	6	13	62	56	+6	36	Play-offs UEFA Cup
7	FC Twente	34	12	12	10	39	44	−5	36	Play-offs UEFA Cup
8	Sparta	34	11	12	11	52	48	+4	34	
9	Fortuna Sittard	34	10	12	12	47	49	−2	32	
10	FC Den Bosch	34	10	12	12	43	52	−9	32	
11	PEC Zwolle	34	10	11	13	61	57	+4	31	
12	HFC Haarlem	34	11	9	14	32	57	−25	31	
13	FC Groningen	34	9	12	13	43	43	0	30	
14	FC Den Haag	34	8	12	14	46	64	−18	28	Cup Winners' Cup
15	AZ	34	7	13	14	31	57	−26	27	
16	Go Ahead Eagles	34	5	13	16	23	48	−25	23	Relegation to Eerste Divisie
17	SC Veendam	34	4	15	15	37	67	−30	23	Relegation to Eerste Divisie
18	Excelsior	34	5	9	20	40	91	−51	19	Relegation to Eerste Divisie

Source: rsssf.com

== Results ==
Home \ Away	AJA	AZ	DBO	EXC	FEY	FSI	GAE	GRO	DHA	HFC	PEC	PSV	RJC	SPA	TWE	UTR	VEE	VVV
Ajax		2–0	3–1	3–0	1–3	6–2	3–2	0–0	2–3	6–0	5–2	3–0	2–0	3–0	4–0	3–0	4–0	4–0
AZ	1–6		2–1	3–0	2–0	0–0	1–0	0–4	2–2	0–1	1–3	0–0	2–1	0–2	1–1	1–1	0–0	2–1
FC Den Bosch '67	1–4	2–2		1–1	2–1	3–1	0–1	1–1	3–1	1–1	5–2	1–2	0–0	0–0	0–0	0–1	1–3	1–1
Excelsior	0–2	2–3	1–2		1–6	3–2	1–1	0–0	0–2	2–2	2–2	2–3	1–1	0–2	1–1	2–4	1–0	1–2
Feyenoord	2–3	8–0	3–2	5–1		1–1	1–1	1–1	4–0	2–1	3–2	1–1	3–2	3–2	5–0	1–1	3–2	1–1
Fortuna Sittard	1–3	2–1	5–1	3–0	1–1		2–0	2–2	4–0	0–0	2–5	0–1	0–2	3–2	1–0	1–0	1–1	0–0
Go Ahead Eagles	1–1	1–1	0–0	1–0	0–2	0–0		1–0	2–0	1–2	0–3	0–2	2–2	0–3	0–2	0–3	0–0	1–1
FC Groningen	0–3	0–0	0–1	6–0	1–0	0–1	0–0		1–0	3–1	3–0	0–2	1–4	1–1	4–2	3–0	1–1	0–0
FC Den Haag	0–2	2–0	2–2	5–2	2–2	0–4	0–1	1–1		4–0	2–2	2–6	2–0	1–3	0–1	3–2	0–1	1–1
FC Haarlem	0–3	1–1	1–3	0–1	1–0	1–1	3–2	1–0	1–1		1–1	0–3	3–1	1–0	0–3	2–1	0–0	2–0
PEC Zwolle '82	0–1	3–1	0–1	2–3	0–0	3–1	1–1	2–1	1–1	4–0		2–0	0–1	1–1	0–1	2–4	1–1	1–1
PSV	1–0	3–0	6–1	7–0	0–0	2–1	2–0	6–1	7–3	5–0	3–1		3–0	3–1	4–0	5–0	4–0	3–0
Roda JC	1–1	1–0	2–1	3–0	0–4	2–0	4–0	3–2	0–0	1–0	2–5	0–4		1–2	1–1	2–1	1–1	1–1
Sparta Rotterdam	2–6	1–1	3–1	2–2	1–2	1–1	1–1	2–1	2–0	0–1	2–1	1–1	1–1		0–1	3–0	3–3	4–0
FC Twente	2–1	1–0	0–1	2–2	2–2	1–0	1–1	0–0	0–0	2–3	2–2	0–3	2–3	3–2		0–1	3–0	0–0
FC Utrecht	2–1	0–0	1–1	5–3	4–2	4–1	2–0	1–0	2–2	2–1	3–2	1–4	0–1	3–0	1–2		7–1	1–2
SC Veendam	0–1	3–1	1–2	2–3	1–1	2–2	3–2	2–3	2–2	0–0	1–4	0–3	0–3	1–1	0–2	2–2		1–1
VVV	3–0	2–2	0–0	6–2	3–0	1–1	1–0	4–2	1–2	3–1	1–1	0–0	0–4	1–1	1–1	3–2	4–2	

Legend: Blue = home team win; Yellow = draw; Red = away team win.

== Play-offs ==
This year, play-offs were held for one UEFA-Cup-ticket.

Pos	Team	Pld	W	D	L	GF	GA	GD	Pts	Qualification
1	FC Utrecht	6	3	2	1	11	7	+4	8	UEFA Cup
2	FC Twente	6	2	2	2	7	6	+1	6	
3	Roda JC	6	2	2	2	10	10	0	6	
4	VVV	6	1	2	3	6	11	−5	3 (Note: 1 point deducted?)	

== Attendances ==
No.	Club	Average	Change	Highest
1	PSV	19,618	6,8%	27,500
2	Feyenoord	13,583	-2,7%	52,000
3	AFC Ajax	12,882	-12,4%	40,000
4	FC Groningen	8,972	-15,2%	18,000
5	FC Den Haag	8,154	-4,6%	25,000
6	VVV	7,600	7,4%	17,000
7	Roda JC	6,971	26,6%	12,000
8	FC Twente	6,568	4,8%	13,000
9	FC Utrecht	5,647	-18,4%	17,000
10	Fortuna Sittard	5,557	-20,4%	10,700
11	FC Den Bosch	5,544	-12,2%	22,000
12	PEC Zwolle	5,118	53,3%	13,000
13	SC Veendam	4,859	37,8%	10,500
14	Sparta	4,353	17,9%	12,000
15	Go Ahead Eagles	3,612	-26,0%	9,000
16	AZ	3,321	1,5%	10,000
17	HFC Haarlem	3,068	1,5%	10,000
18	Excelsior	2,493	-28,4%	8,500

== See also ==
- 1986–87 Eerste Divisie
- 1986–87 KNVB Cup
