= 1988–89 Eredivisie =

33rd season of the Eredivisie

Eredivisie
- Season: 1988–89
- Champions: PSV (11th title)
- Promoted: RKC; MVV; Veendam
- Relegated: PEC Zwolle; VVV; Veendam
- European Cup: PSV
- Cup Winners' Cup: FC Groningen
- UEFA Cup: Ajax; FC Twente; Feyenoord
- Goals: 906
- Average goals/game: 2.96
- Top goalscorer: (Brazil) Romário; PSV 19 goals

The Dutch Eredivisie in the 1988–89 season was contested by 18 teams. PSV won the championship.

== League standings ==
Pos	Team	Pld	W	D	L	GF	GA	GD	Pts	Qualification or relegation
1	PSV (C)	34	24	5	5	78	31	+47	53	Qualification to European Cup first round (Note: PSV also won the KNVB Cup, thereby taking the double. They would participate in the European Cup, so finalists FC Groningen could play in the Cup Winners' Cup.)
2	Ajax	34	22	6	6	74	32	+42	50	Qualification to UEFA Cup first round
3	FC Twente	34	11	18	5	47	25	+22	40	Qualification to UEFA Cup first round
4	Feyenoord	34	15	10	9	66	52	+14	40	Qualification to UEFA Cup first round
5	Roda JC	34	13	12	9	52	38	+14	38	
6	FC Groningen	34	14	8	12	62	51	+11	36	Qualification to European Cup Winners' Cup first round
7	BVV Den Bosch (Note: Clubs participating in the 1989 Intertoto Cup.)	34	15	6	13	48	53	−5	36	
8	Fortuna Sittard	34	11	12	11	40	37	+3	34	
9	FC Volendam	34	13	7	14	42	51	−9	33	
10	HFC Haarlem	34	11	11	12	37	50	−13	33	
11	RKC	34	11	9	14	53	61	−8	31	
12	Sparta	34	9	12	13	42	50	−8	30	
13	FC Utrecht	34	11	7	16	49	57	−8	29	
14	MVV	34	10	9	15	41	58	−17	29	
15	Willem II	34	8	11	15	50	68	−18	27	
16	PEC Zwolle (R)	34	8	9	17	48	70	−22	25	Relegation to Eerste Divisie
17	VVV (R)	34	5	14	15	40	62	−22	24	Relegation to Eerste Divisie
18	Veendam (R)	34	8	8	18	37	60	−23	24	Relegation to Eerste Divisie

Source: rsssf.com
(C) Champions; (R) Relegated

== Results ==
Home \ Away	AJA	DBO	FEY	FSI	GRO	HFC	MVV	PEC	PSV	RKC	RJC	SPA	TWE	UTR	VEE	VOL	VVV	WIL
Ajax		5–1	4–1	2–0	3–0	5–0	4–0	0–0	2–0	3–2	3–3	2–1	1–1	2–0	4–0	2–0	1–0	1–0
BVV Den Bosch	0–3		2–0	0–3	1–1	2–5	3–0	4–0	2–2	1–0	0–1	2–1	1–1	1–0	1–1	0–1	1–4	5–1
Feyenoord	1–2	3–0		4–2	2–1	3–0	5–2	1–1	2–2	0–0	2–1	3–2	1–1	3–3	2–2	4–0	2–2	5–0
Fortuna Sittard	2–1	0–1	1–0		0–0	1–1	1–1	1–0	1–0	2–0	1–1	3–0	0–0	1–2	1–2	1–1	1–0	2–2
FC Groningen	1–4	4–0	1–1	2–2		2–0	4–1	3–0	1–2	1–2	1–0	2–1	2–0	4–2	1–3	4–0	7–3	5–3
FC Haarlem	0–1	0–0	1–2	2–2	2–1		0–4	0–0	2–0	1–1	1–0	2–0	2–1	2–1	1–0	3–0	2–0	2–2
MVV	1–1	0–2	1–0	2–1	3–1	1–1		4–2	1–3	1–0	2–1	2–0	0–1	0–2	1–2	1–3	2–0	0–2
PEC Zwolle '82	4–1	2–3	2–4	2–0	1–3	1–2	3–0		0–5	3–0	0–1	1–1	2–2	2–1	6–2	0–0	2–2	3–2
PSV	1–4	5–2	1–0	1–0	1–0	3–0	3–1	2–0		5–2	4–2	0–1	3–0	3–0	3–1	2–0	5–2	7–0
RKC	3–1	0–1	1–1	3–2	2–1	3–1	1–0	1–1	0–0		1–4	2–2	1–1	5–3	0–1	5–1	6–0	3–1
Roda JC	0–0	3–2	3–1	1–1	1–1	4–1	1–1	2–1	0–1	3–1		4–0	1–1	0–0	2–0	0–0	2–1	2–0
Sparta Rotterdam	3–2	1–1	1–3	1–0	1–1	0–0	1–1	3–1	0–2	2–2	0–1		1–1	3–0	3–1	3–0	1–1	1–1
FC Twente	2–1	0–1	6–1	0–0	4–0	0–0	0–0	3–1	1–1	7–1	0–0	2–0		0–0	3–0	3–0	1–0	0–0
FC Utrecht	1–1	1–2	3–1	3–1	3–2	2–1	2–2	5–1	1–3	1–2	3–2	2–2	2–0		3–0	2–0	0–0	0–2
BV Veendam	0–1	1–3	1–2	1–1	0–0	2–0	4–1	1–2	1–2	2–0	4–4	0–1	0–3	1–0		0–2	0–0	1–1
FC Volendam	1–0	2–0	1–3	0–2	0–1	4–0	1–2	1–1	1–1	4–2	1–0	3–1	1–1	4–0	3–1		1–1	0–2
VVV	1–2	1–0	1–1	1–2	1–1	1–1	1–1	6–2	0–2	1–1	2–2	0–2	1–1	2–1	2–1	1–2		1–1
Willem II	2–5	1–3	1–2	0–2	2–3	1–1	2–2	4–1	1–3	3–0	1–0	2–2	0–0	2–0	1–1	2–4	5–1	

Legend: Blue = home team win; Yellow = draw; Red = away team win.

== Attendances ==
No.	Club	Average	Change	Highest
1	PSV	24,474	14,1%	28,500
2	Feyenoord	13,913	40,8%	50,289
3	AFC Ajax	11,871	16,7%	52,000
4	FC Groningen	7,539	-3,6%	15,000
5	Willem II	7,074	-15,6%	11,000
6	FC Twente	6,785	3,1%	18,000
7	FC Utrecht	6,706	20,4%	15,500
8	Roda JC	5,576	4,5%	12,000
9	Fortuna Sittard	5,476	1,7%	14,500
10	VVV	5,319	-35,3%	11,573
11	MVV Maastricht	5,165	61,4%	10,000
12	FC Volendam	4,862	8,6%	11,000
13	SC Veendam	4,524	20,7%	8,600
14	PEC Zwolle	3,938	-15,5%	12,000
15	FC Den Bosch	3,868	2,3%	12,500
16	Sparta Rotterdam	3,776	-22,7%	10,000
17	RKC	3,767	16,8%	8,200
18	HFC Haarlem	2,953	-4,4%	10,500

== See also ==
- 1988–89 Eerste Divisie
- 1988–89 KNVB Cup
