= SC Veendam =

Dutch professional football club

- Full name: Sportclub Veendam
- Nicknames: Veenkolonialen (lit. 'Peat colonials')
- Founded: 4 September 1894
- Dissolved: 2 April 2013
- Ground: De Langeleegte
- Capacity: 6,500
Home colours

Sportclub Veendam (Dutch pronunciation: [ɛs seː veːnˈdɑm]) was a Dutch professional association football club based in Veendam, Groningen province. Founded in 1894 as Look-Out, the club underwent several name changes: P.J. Veendam in 1909, Veendam in 1910, SC Veendam in 1974, BV Veendam in 1997 and again SC Veendam in 2011.

Veendam were a founder member of the regional first-tier Eerste Klasse Noord in 1916 and won the division in 1931–32, qualifying for the national championship play-offs where they finished in bottom place. They were also a founder member of the third-tier Tweede Divisie in 1956–57; after yo-yoing between the third and second tiers, the team won promotion to the first-tier Eredivisie for the first time in 1985–86. They competed in the Eredivisie during the 1986–87 and 1988–89 seasons but were relegated on both occasions. Veendam then competed in the second-tier Eerste Divisie until they were dissolved due to financial problems in 2013.

Their home ground was De Langeleegte, where they had played since their foundation. Although Veendam is a small town with around 20,000 inhabitants, the club recorded average attendances of around 3,500. The side were nicknamed "Veenkolonialen" (lit. 'Peat colonials'), reflecting the area's peat history. The club's home kit colours were black and yellow. Veendam had a rivalry with FC Groningen, with whom they contested the Groningse derby, and with Drenthe-based FC Emmen.

== History ==
=== 1894–1960 ===
The club was founded on 4 September 1894 as Look-Out by Be Quick 1887 youth player Bruins Oving, who was lodging in Veendam, Carel Herman Steenhuisen and other young players from the town. Their first pitch was opposite coaching inn ’t Vosje at De Langeleegte. In 1905, the club and another Veendam-based team, Vitesse, merged; the name Look-Out was retained. After Princess Juliana was born in 1909, the name Look-Out was changed to P.J. Veendam, although the club removed the abbreviation “P.J.” the following year. Veendam were one of the founder members of the regional first-tier Eerste Klasse Noord in 1916, but finished seventh and last in the inaugural season. In 1919, Veendam merged with Jupiter, a club from a working-class background; the name Veendam was retained. After several mid-table finishes, the team finished runners-up in 1929–30 and 1930–31, before winning their first and only Eerste Klasse Noord title in 1931–32. Veendam qualified for the national championship play-offs. They played Ajax, Feijenoord, SC Enschede and PSV, but won only one game (away at PSV) and finished in bottom place.

As a result of the club's successful spell, Veendam winger Jaap Woltjes was called up by the Dutch national team for a friendly against English side Nottingham Forest in 1936; Woltjes came on as a substitute in a 1–0 defeat. Although Veendam recorded a second-place finish in the 1935–36 Eerste Klasse Noord, they began to slide down the league table, and were eventually relegated to the Tweede Klasse in 1947–48. In 1950, the club appointed its first coach, Wim Vaal. Veendam returned to the Eerste Klasse in 1954. During the same year, the club turned professional. The Veendam players earned 15 guilders per win (the equivalent of €69 as of 2024 (Note: 1900–present: "Prijzen toen en nu". cbs.nl (in Dutch). Centraal Bureau voor de Statistiek. 1450–1900: "Value of the Guilder versus Euro". iisg.amsterdam. International Institute of Social History. 14 June 2021. Archived from the original on 24 May 2024.)), 10 per draw and 5 per loss; the players also received 5 guilders per week if they took part in three training sessions. In 1956, Dutch football was reorganised, and the first-tier Eredivisie, the second-tier Eerste Divisie and the third-tier Tweede Divisie were established; Veendam were founder members of the Tweede Divisie and finished the 1956–57 season in fourth place. They won promotion to the Eerste Divisie by finishing as runners-up in 1958–59.

=== 1960–1990 ===
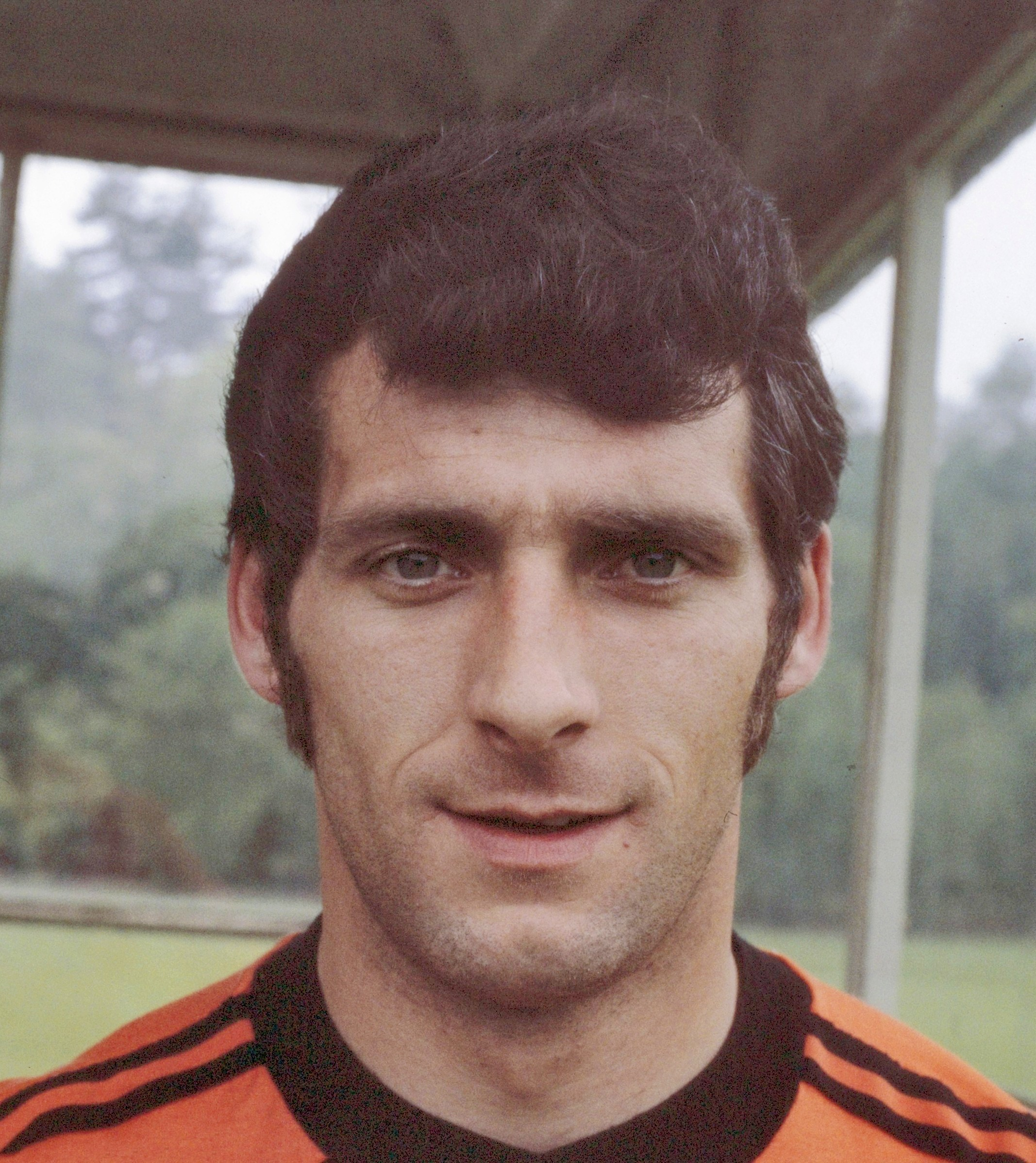
Dick Nanninga (pictured in 1978) made his professional debut at Veendam in 1973

In 1961, the club reorganised its structure by establishing three boards: for the professional department, the amateur teams and for the youth section. During this period, several Veendam players received employment at the local DWM potato starch factory. Veendam were relegated back to the Tweede Divisie in 1964–65, but won promotion back to the second tier in 1967–68. The club appointed 26-year-old Leo Beenhakker as coach in 1968; he remained in post until 1972 and later managed Ajax and Real Madrid. In 1974, the club's professional and amateur departments split; the professional side continued under the name SC Veendam. During the 1977–78 KNVB Cup, Veendam defeated Feyenoord 2–1 in the third round and reached the quarter-finals, in which they were eliminated 4–2 on aggregate by Excelsior. Two future Dutch international strikers made their professional debuts with Veendam during this period: Dick Nanninga in 1973 and Jurrie Koolhof in 1978.

Veendam came close to bankruptcy in 1984 but a deficit of 2,5 million guilders was eliminated. During the same year, former Veendam player Henk Nienhuis became the club's coach. Under his tenure, Veendam won promotion to the Eredivisie for the first time in 1985–86. The team finished the season in fourth place and qualified for the promotion play-offs; Veendam were victorious in all six matches and won promotion to the top flight. Around 12,500 spectators attended the decisive game at De Langeleegte against Willem II, in which Veendam secured a 1–0 win through a goal by Boy Nijgh. Nienhuis’ squad was mostly composed of former FC Groningen players, such as Joop Gall, Pieter Huistra and Harris Huizingh. Veendam finished 17th out of 18 teams in 1986–87 and were relegated back to the second tier. The following season, in 1987–88, they finished second in the Eerste Divisie and won promotion back to the Eredivisie. Veendam finished the 1988–89 season in bottom place and were again relegated after one season in the top flight.

=== 1990–2013 ===
In the 1995–96 Eerste Divisie, the team qualified for the promotion play-offs but finished second in the group behind NEC Nijmegen and remained in the second tier. In 1997, SC Veendam changed its name to BV Veendam (“Betaald Voetbal Veendam” in full; lit. 'Professional Football Veendam'). The club was plaged by financial problems during the following years, and in 2003, it sold De Langeleegte to the municipality of Veendam for a fee of €3.2 million. Nevertheless, Veendam qualified for the 2006–07 Eerste Divisie promotion play-offs but were eliminated by Excelsior in the second round. The team reached the Eerste Divisie promotion play-offs again in 2010–11 but were eliminated in the semi-final by Helmond Sport.

In 2010, Veendam were declared bankrupt but it was later annulled on appeal. The following year, in order to attract more investors, the club was renamed SC Veendam, adopted a new badge which included a peat wheelbarrow, and a yellow shirt with a black V. The financial problems remained, however, and Veendam played their last ever match on 15 March 2013—a 2–1 win against FC Oss—and were declared bankrupt on 25 March. The club was dissolved on 2 April, with debts of around €1 million. Veendam 1894, the amateur club from which Veendam split in 1974, still exists as of 2021.

According to a reconstruction made by RTV Noord and Dagblad van het Noorden in August 2013, the death of catering entrepreneur and Veendam supporter Jan Lambeck in 2009 meant the end of an important income source, which eventually led to the bankruptcy of the club.

== Colours and crest ==
The club's first kit was a blue shirt with a red sash, white shorts and a blue calotte which included the name “Look-Out”. In 1919, when Veendam merged with Jupiter, the kit was changed to a yellow shirt and black shorts. The club retained the yellow and black colours until its dissolvement in 2013.

Veendam had several badges throughout their history. From 1997 to 2011, when the club played under the name BV Veendam, its black and yellow crest featured a football and the words "De Langeleegte". In 2011, the club adopted a new logo, which was chosen by around 2,500 fans, designers of Groningen-based La Compagnie and members of Veendam's businessclub. The badge, designed by La Compagnie's Herman ter Reegen, featured a yellow shield with a black V and a peat wheelbarrow, reflecting the area's peat history.

== Stadium ==
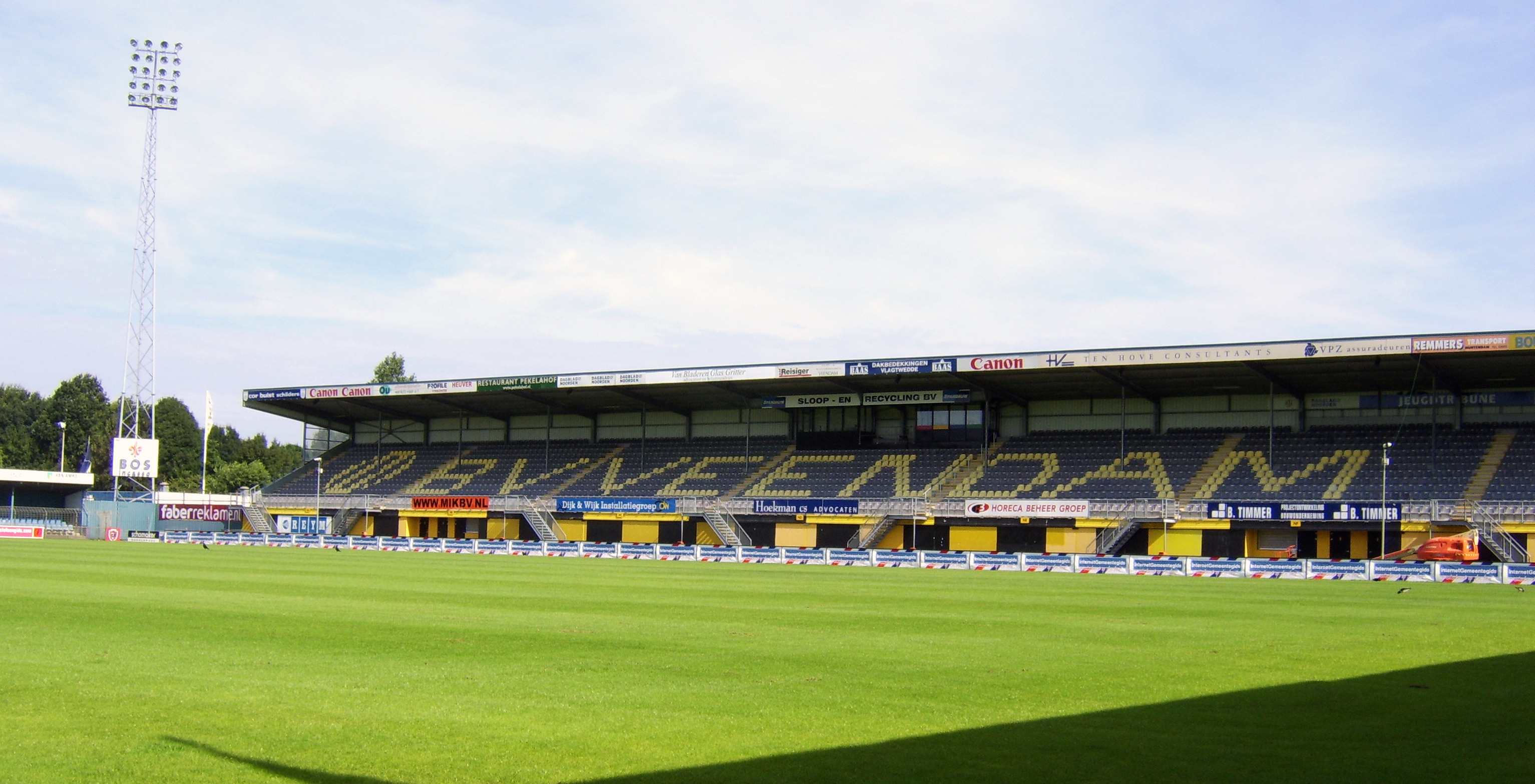
De Langeleegte pictured in 2007

Veendam's first pitch was opposite coaching inn ’t Vosje at De Langeleegte. In 1945, the club’s first team moved to the pitch at De Langeleegte’s swimming pool. In 1954, De Langeleegte stadium was opened by minister Sicco Mansholt. The first floodlights were installed in 1960, and De Langeleegte became the first Dutch stadium to have a covered standing terrace and underseat heating. The ground was redeveloped in 1998 and its capacity was reduced to a 6,500 all-seater. As the club was plaged by financial problems during the following years, it sold De Langeleegte to the Veendam municipality in 2003.

In 2008, the club expressed an interest in building a new stadium away from De Langeleegte, adjacent to the N33 motorway, much to the dismay of most Veendam fans. Designed by Klaas Paul de Boer, the proposed ground was intended to have a capacity of 15,000. Its unusual design, featuring curved sides on the grandstand, quickly earned it the nickname 'Bananenstadion' (lit. 'Banana stadium') among locals. The project ultimately stalled, and De Langeleegte remained Veendam's home ground.

== Supporters and rivalries ==
Veendam is a small town of about 20,000 inhabitants in eastern Groningen, one of the poorest regions in the Netherlands. During their final seasons, the club averaged around 3,500 spectators per match, with attendances often rising to 5,500 for games against local rivals.

Veendam contested the Groningse derby with FC Groningen, the only other professional football team from Groningen province. Groningen held the better head-to-head record, winning 13 games to Veendam's 5. The sides met four times in the Eredivisie—in 1986–87 and 1988–89—with both winning once. Veendam's other rivals were FC Emmen from Drenthe; Veendam won 19 matches, while Emmen were victorious in 17 games.

== Honours ==
Eerste Divisie (Tier 2)

- Promotion: 1985–86, 1987–88

Tweede Divisie (Tier 3)

- Promotion: 1958–59, 1967–68

Eerste Klasse Noord

- Champions: 1931–32

== Records and statistics ==
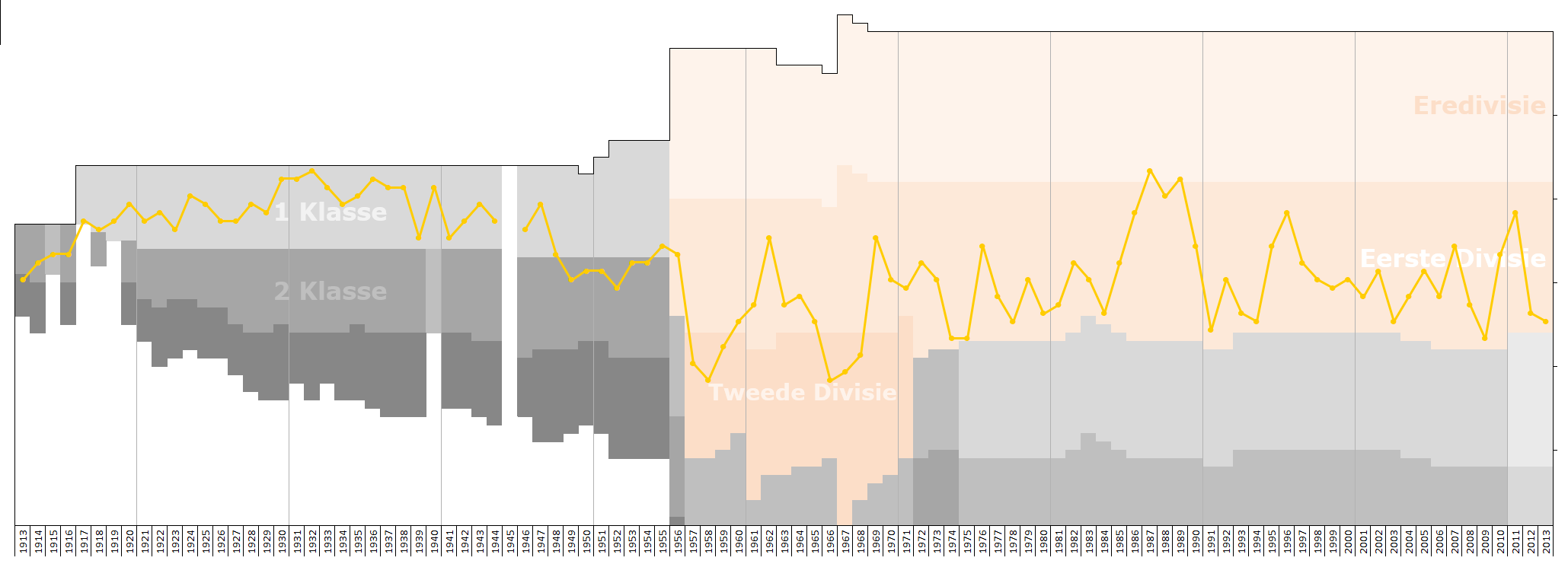
Historical chart of Veendam's league performance

The record for the most first-team appearances in all competitions for Veendam was held by defender Max Rosies, who played more than 700 games for the club between 1944 and 1963. Veendam's top goal scorer was Marnix Kolder, who scored 104 goals in two spells for the club. Kolder also played for Veendam 1894 from 2016 to 2020, scoring 103 goals. Ivan Tsvetkov and Michael de Leeuw were the only Veendam players to be crowned Eerste Divisie top goal scorer, in 2001–02 and 2009–10, respectively. In 1972, Veendam's Eltje Edens became the first player in Dutch professional football to receive a yellow card, in a game against HVC.

Veendam's largest victory was a 9–0 win against CVV Germanicus in the 1960–61 KNVB Cup. The club's largest win in league football was an 8–0 victory against Zwolsche Boys in the 1957–58 Tweede Divisie. The largest defeat was a 10–0 loss to FC Utrecht in the 2000–01 KNVB Cup. Veendam's highest recorded home attendance was 13,500, for a 1979–80 Eerste Divisie match against FC Groningen on 2 March 1980.
