= Damasco =

Damasco may refer to:

- Raynick Damasco, Curaçaoan footballer
- Damasco, an alternate spelling of Damascus

== See also ==
- Damascone
- Damasceno
