= Sportpark Berg & Bos =

Sports park in Apeldoorn, Netherlands

Berg & Bos
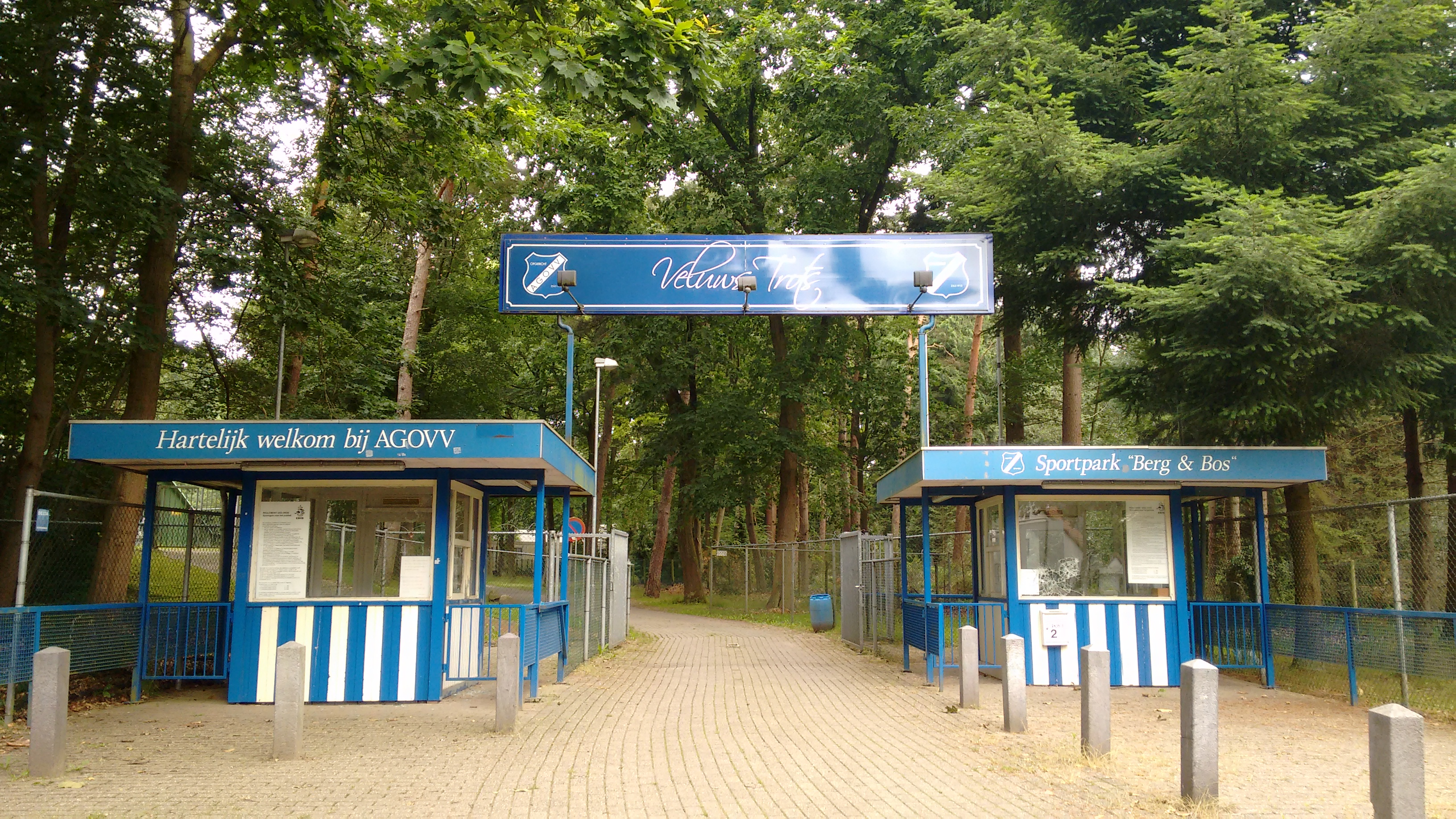
- Interactive map of Berg & Bos
- Full name: Sportpark Berg & Bos
- Location: Apeldoorn, Netherlands
- Coordinates: 52°12′34″N 5°55′45″E
- Owner: AGOVV
- Capacity: 3,250 seats (Stadion Berg & Bos)

Construction
- Opened: 1921
- Renovated: 2003; 2016
- Expanded: 2003
- Architect: Gerrit de Zeeuw

Tenants
- AGOVV; KNVB

The Sportpark Berg & Bos is a football complex located in the Dutch city Apeldoorn. It is the home port of AGOVV.

AGOVV has been playing at Sportpark Berg en Bos in the neighbourhood of the same name in the west of Apeldoorn since 1921. The sports park is located in a wooded area and is adjacent to Apenheul. The complex includes four football fields and a football stadium. In the early years there was not only football, the annual hippique concours also took place here. The sports park was named the most beautiful football complex in the Netherlands in 2021 by the football magazine Voetbal International.

== Stadion Berg & Bos ==
For the return of AGOVV to professional football in 2003, a football stadium was built at the sports park. The stadium bears the name Stadion Berg & Bos and has a capacity of 3250 seats. This while the sports park was visited by more people in the past during practice matches or important matches. Examples of this are the match against the Dutch national football team led by Louis van Gaal, which was attended by 12,000 people, and the match against SC Heerenveen by Abe Lenstra, where 25,000 spectators were present. The record number of spectators in professional football was achieved on September 24, 2009, during the AGOVV – Ajax (1–2) cup match. The stadium was completely sold out with 3,500 spectators.

Since 2006, the stadium has had an artificial turf from Royal Ten Cate NV, which has been approved by the UEFA. The stadium bore the sponsored name Fly Brazil & Desko Stadium from 2010 to 2013.

Partly because AGOVV repeatedly expressed its ambition to promote to the Eredivisie, there were plans to have the club build a new stadium with a capacity of approximately 6,000 spectators. A location that came into view was the Kuipersdijk near De Maten and Apeldoorn South. Later, a place on the Europaweg in the southwest gate of Apeldoorn received serious attention. Another option was that the municipality of Apeldoorn would buy back the current site from the football club (it was sold in 1999) on which AGOVV would become the tenant of the complex. However, the negotiations fell through in March 2012 because AGOVV thought the price offered was too low.

On January 8, 2013, the professional branch AGOVV Apeldoorn was declared bankrupt. The amateurs continued to play in the stadium.

== Main stand ==
The main stand was designed in 1924 by city architect Gerrit de Zeeuw. The main stand is on the municipal monuments list and is located next to the club building 'De Blauwe Drukte', which also dates from the 1920s. The unemployed were employed in construction within the framework of the job creation.

In July 2012, the Municipality of Apeldoorn ordered the closing of the monumental main stand, after the Asian longhorn beetle had severely damaged a load-bearing pole. There was a threat of collapse of the grandstand, which was averted by a metal emergency construction. The board of AGOVV was instructed to submit a recovery plan to the municipality, taking into account the monumental status. Because it did not want to proceed with such a plan from the financially distressed club, the municipality decided to close the stand in December 2012.

The main stand was thoroughly renovated in 2016, which was financed through a municipal subsidy and a crowdfunding campaign. Former player Klaas-Jan Huntelaar had called to save the stands. Supporters symbolically sponsored their own seat for 100 euros. After the renovation, the main stand at Berg en Bos has been put back into use.

In 2021, the main stand was voted the most beautiful main stand in Gelderland by platform Nederlandse Velden.
