= AGOVV =

Dutch football club

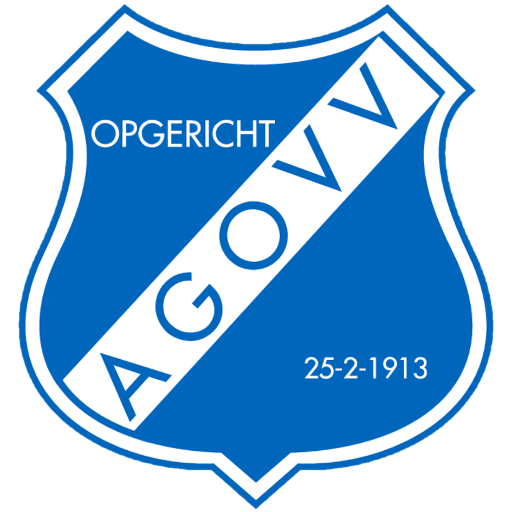
- Full name: Alleen Gezamenlijk Oefenen; Voert Verder
- Nicknames: De Blauwen (The Blues); Veluws Trots (Pride of the Veluwe); Apeldoorners
- Founded: 25 February 1913; 113 years ago
- Ground: Stadion Berg & Bos, Apeldoorn
- Capacity: 3,250
- League: Derde Klasse
- 2024–25: Saturday Derde Klasse M (District East), 7th of 14
- Website: agovv.nl
Home colours	Away colours

AGOVV (Dutch pronunciation: [ˌaːɣeːjoːveːˈveː]) is a Dutch football club based in Apeldoorn, Gelderland. Founded on 25 February 1913, the club competes in the Derde Klasse, the eighth tier of the Dutch football league system.

AGOVV played professional football between 1954 and 1971, and again from 2003 until 2013, when its professional branch was declared bankrupt and dissolved. During its time in the professional ranks, the club competed in the Eerste Divisie and was known for developing players such as Klaas-Jan Huntelaar.

The club's full name, Apeldoornse Geheel Onthouders Voetbalvereniging, reflects its origins as a teetotalers' sporting association. AGOVV plays its home matches at the Sportpark Berg & Bos and traditionally wears blue kits.

== History ==
=== 1913–54: Early years ===
The club was founded on 25 February 1913 – by the teetotalers singing club – as AGOSV, which stood for Apeldoornse Geheel Onthoudersvoetbalvereniging Steeds Voorwaarts Dutch pronunciation: [ˈaːpəlˌdoːr(ə)nsə ɣəˈɦeːl ˈɔntɦʌu̯dərsˌfudbɑlvəˌreːnəɣɪŋ ˈsteːts ˈfoːrˌʋaːrts], after having experienced firsthand the drinking abuse after sports matches on Sundays. (Note: In isolation, voorwaarts, alleen, oefenen and verder are pronounced Dutch pronunciation: [ˈvoːrˌʋaːrts], Dutch pronunciation: [ɑˈleːn], Dutch pronunciation: [ˈufənə(n)] and Dutch pronunciation: [ˈvɛrdər], respectively.) The founders decided to play in a blue kit because the colour blue was a symbol of the temperance movement.

When the club joined the football association of Gelderland, the club had to change its name, because there was another club called Steeds Voorwaarts. The name was changed to AGOVV, or Apeldoornse Geheel Onthouders Voetbalvereniging, which means Apeldoorn football club for teetotalers. The meaning of the abbreviation was altered in 1921 to its current name. AGOVV became Alleen Gezamenlijk Oefenen Voert Verder Dutch pronunciation: [ɑˈleːŋ ɣəˈzaːmə(n)lək ˈufənə(ɱ) ˈvurt ˈfɛrdər] (Only Practising Together Brings Us Further)..

Bioscoopjournaal in 1942. In the Zuiderpark Stadion in The Hague, the football clubs ADO and AGOVV play for the championship of the Netherlands. (5–2 in favor of ADO).

In 1938, AGOVV reached the final of the KNVB Cup in which they lost to VSV.

AGOVV achieved its best results in the 1941–42 and 1948–49 seasons, where they won the title in the Eerste Klasse East division and in the First Class Championship (today known as the Eredivisie), finished in third place.

=== 1954–71: First professional era ===
AGOVV became a professional club in 1954; the same year as professionalism in football was legalised in the Netherlands. After having played for several years with varying success in the Eerste Klasse and in the Eerste Divisie from 1956 to 1957, the Royal Dutch Football Association (KNVB) formed a football pyramid with three divisions from 1962: the second-tier Eerste Divisie and the third-tier Tweede Divisie and above that the Eredivisie; the premier division in Dutch football. AGOVV mostly spent its existence in the lower regions of these tiers and were removed from professional football in 1971. The most famous players from the period of professional football were goalkeeper Joop Niezen, who later became editor-in-chief of Voetbal International, and centre-forward Sietze de Vries.

=== 1971–2003: Amateur years ===
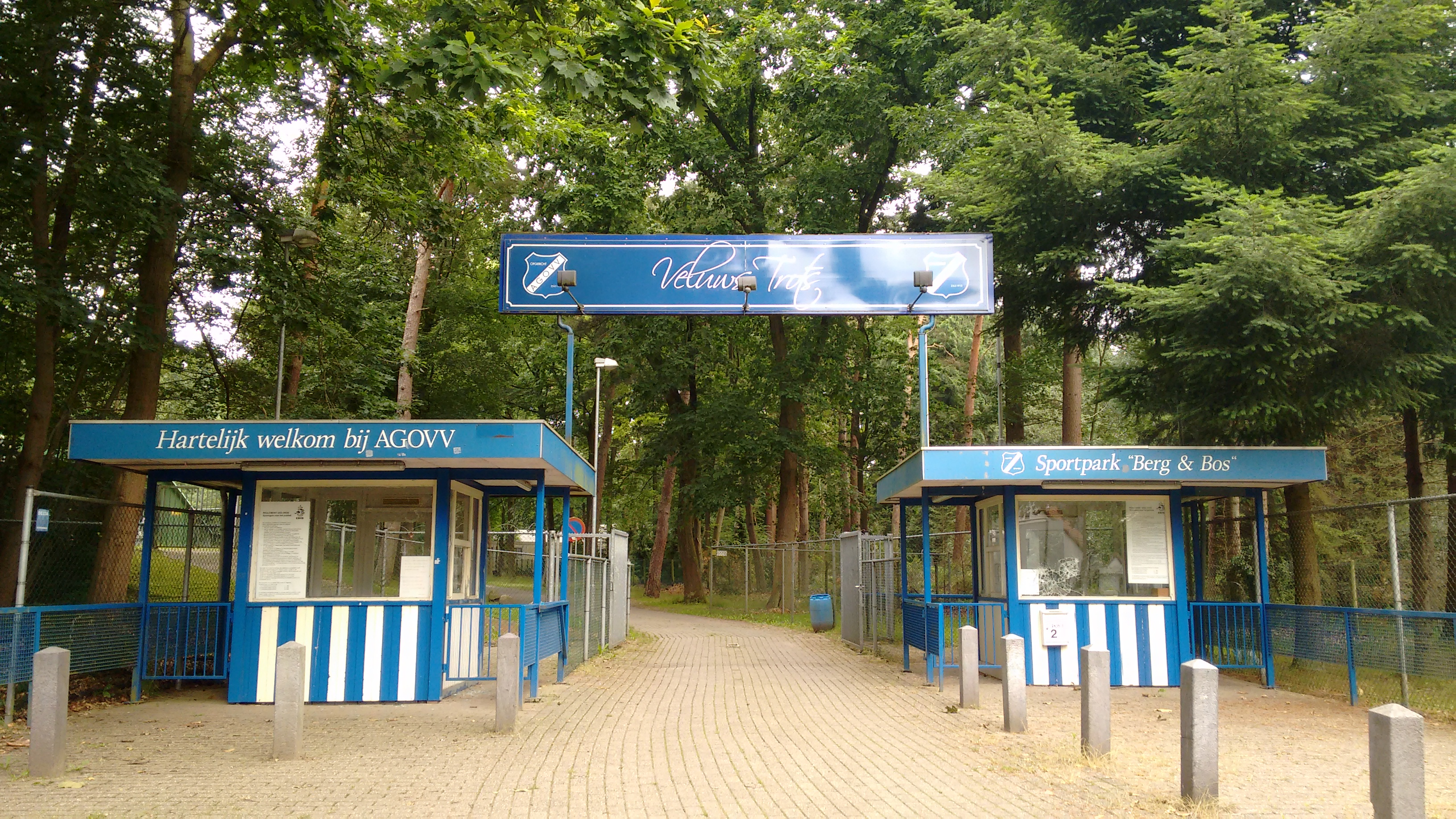
Entrance Sportpark Berg & Bos

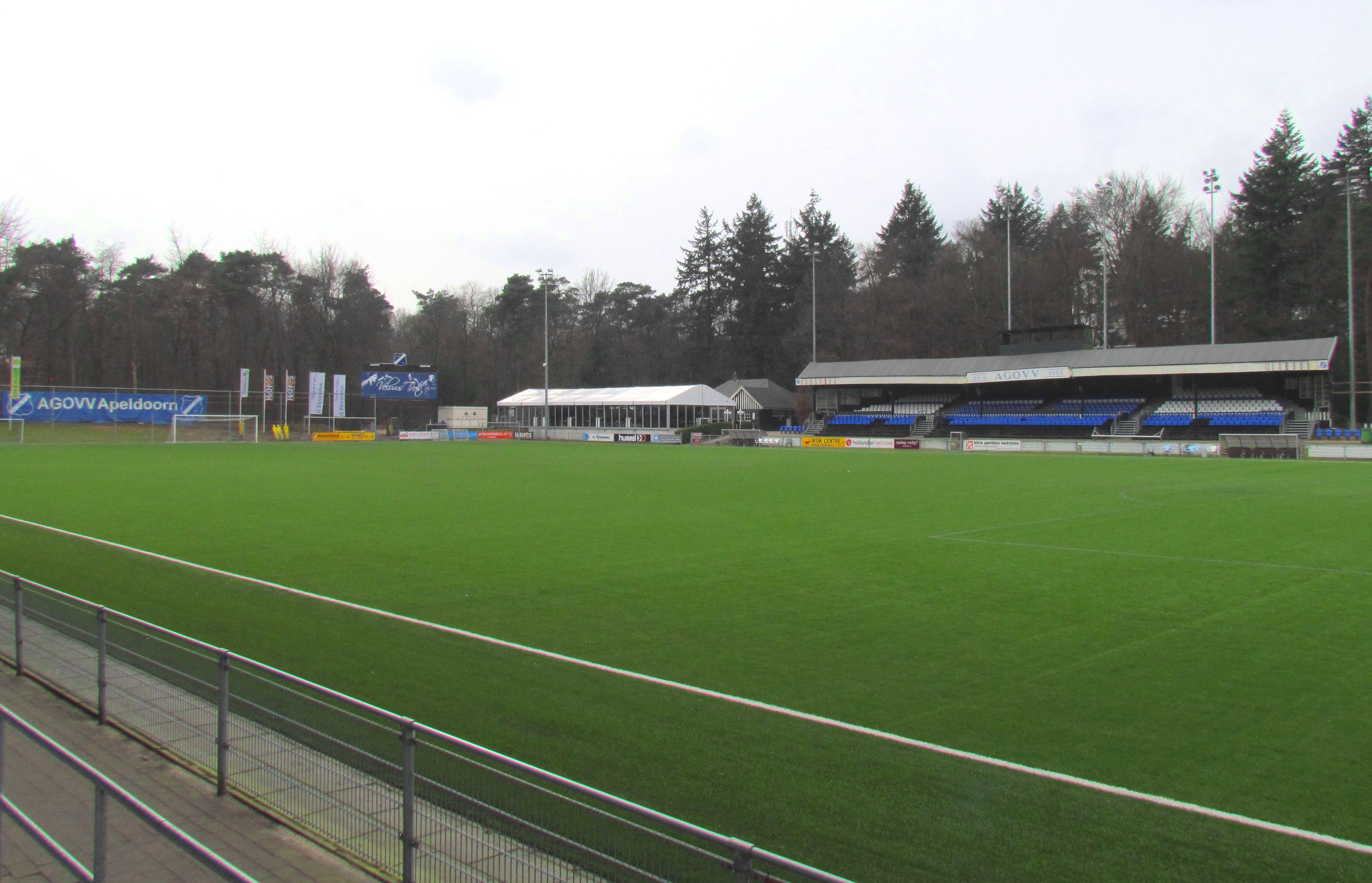
Stadion Berg & Bos

In 1971, the club was removed from professional football by the KNVB by the dissolution of the Tweede Divisie. This led to protests among the citizens of Apeldoorn. The club then played in amateur competitions of the KNVB. Since then, De Blauwen for many years advocated a return to the professional divisions of the KNVB. Incidentally, a uniform strategy for achieving this only started in earnest in the mid-eighties, when a policy plan was presented that initially had to ensure AGOVV's return to the top of amateur football. This eventually yielded results: in the late nineties, the club returned to the upper echelon of amateurism and focused on professional football.

In the 2001–02 season, AGOVV became champion in the Hoofdklasse C under the leadership of manager Peter Bosz and later also won the general amateur championship of the Netherlands. In 2003, AGOVV rejoined professional football and on 1 July 2003 the club began using the name AGOVV Apeldoorn for the professional section. AGOVV Apeldoorn played in the second-tier Eerste Divisie of professional football in the Netherlands in the 2003–04 season.

=== 2003–13: Eerste Divisie ===
Upon returning to professional football, in the 2003–04 season, former international Jurrie Koolhof was appointed as the club's head coach. He succeeded Stanley Menzo, who did not have the necessary coaching diploma. That season, forward Klaas-Jan Huntelaar became top goalscorer of the Eerste Divisie with 26 goals. After two seasons with average success and without having made it to promotion play-offs, management sought a new approach and Koolhof's contract was not extended. Menzo was now in possession of the diploma and was appointed head coach for the 2005–06 season. AGOVV won the post-competition with Menzo for the first time, who then left the club for Volendam after the season. Menzo was succeeded by Rini Coolen. Coolen was sacked halfway through the 2006–07 season due to the poor results. The season was completed by the two assistant coaches Roberto Klomp and Marco Heering without success: AGOVV finished last in the league table.

John van den Brom was contracted as head coach for the next three seasons. A 6th-place finish in the 2009–10 season was the best result since AGOVV's return to professional football, when the club would play one last time in the promotion play-offs. After the 2009–10 season, Van den Brom moved to ADO Den Haag, notwithstanding his one-year ongoing contract; Hans de Koning succeeded him. Because AGOVV and De Koning could not reach an agreement on a new contract after one season, Hans van Arum came over from Vitesse as the new head coach; his first head coaching job. Van Arum was suspended for "security reasons" for the last game of the following season, 2011–12. AGOVV had only missed the bottom spot in the league because FC Emmen had been deducted six points due to financial irregularities. Andries Ulderink became manager for the 2012–13 season.

=== 2012–13: Bankruptcy ===
There had been plans in the AGOVV organisation to build a new stadium for 6,000 spectators in the southwest gate of Apeldoorn. Another option was the buyback by the municipality of Apeldoorn of the existing site that had been sold to AGOVV in 1999, after which the football club would become solely a tenant. In March 2012, it appeared that AGOVV considered the price offered to be too low. There was also the intention to disconnect the professional part of AGOVV from the amateur branch in order to create a new professional football club in sports park Malkenschoten, in which there would be intensive cooperation with amateur football in Apeldoorn, including the independent amateur clubs of AGOVV, Apeldoornse Boys and others.

These and other future plans had become highly uncertain due to a debt of €2 million, of which more than €400,000 tax debt. The tax authorities filed for bankruptcy in December 2012. On 11 December 2012, the court gave AGOVV four weeks to submit a rescue plan. In early January 2013, the KNVB disciplinary committee deducted two points from the club in connection with the financial problems. With that, AGOVV dropped from eleventh to fourteenth place in the league table. On 8 January, AGOVV were declared bankrupt in absentia. The professional club AGOVV was officially declared bankrupt on 11 January 2013, when it was announced on behalf of its board that the bankruptcy was resigned, and the team was pulled from the league. Fans held another fundraiser for their club, raising only €50,000.

Due to the bankruptcy of the professional branch, the amateur association also landed in dire financial straits. In February 2013, the tax authorities gave the club two weeks to settle an overdue debt. The amateur branch was saved by external investors. Sportpark Berg & Bos was also retained.

=== Since 2013: A new beginning ===
The amateur section of AGOVV continued after bankruptcy. As of the 2013–14 season, AGOVV switched from having a Sunday team to Saturday football. AGOVV started in the Saturday Vierde Klasse B, the ninth tier of Dutch football. After one season in the Vierde Klasse Saturday, AGOVV were immediately promoted to the Saturday Derde Klasse B. In 2016, AGOVV were promoted to the Saturday Tweede Klasse G. The shared youth academy with Vitesse was discontinued, which meant that the club saw a drastic fall in membership in the youth department. Since then, the team have managed to establish several youth teams. In addition, the club houses a KNVB youth center.

Financially, the club also showed improvements. Debts were paid off. The renovation of the wooden stand on the Sportpark Berg & Bos was completed and was reopened on 20 August 2016 by alderman Detlev Cziesso. As of the 2024–25 season, AGOVV played in the Derde Klasse, the seventh overall tier in the Dutch football league system.

== Accommodation ==
AGOVV has been playing at Sportpark Berg en Bos in the neighbourhood of the same name in the west of Apeldoorn since 1921. The sports park is located in a wooded area. Due to the return of AGOVV to professional football, a football stadium was built at the sports park in 2003. The stadium bears the name Stadion Berg & Bos and has a capacity of 3250 seats. After the bankruptcy of the professional branch, the amateurs continued to play in the stadium.

== Honours ==
- KNVB Beker
  - Runners-up (1): 1938
- Eerste Klasse Oost
  - Champions (2): 1942, 1949

== Domestic Results ==
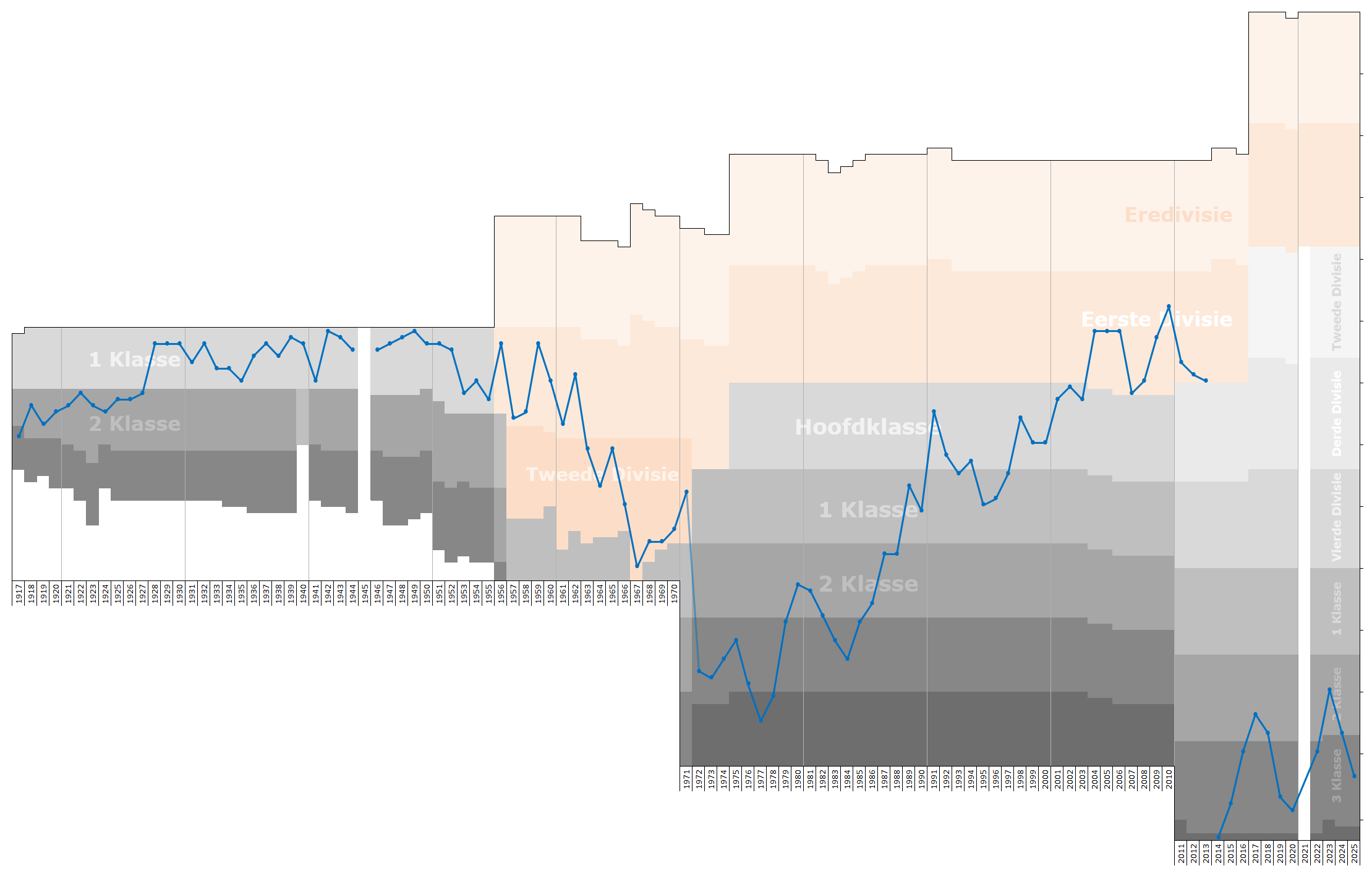
Historical chart of league performance

Below is a table with AGOVV's domestic results since the introduction of professional football in 1956.

Domestic Results since 1956
Domestic league	League result	Qualification to	KNVB Cup season	Cup result
2011–12 Eerste Divisie	17th	–	2011–12	second round
2010–11 Eerste Divisie	15th	–	2010–11	fourth round
2009–10 Eerste Divisie	6th	promotion/relegation play-offs: no promotion	2009–10	second round
2008–09 Eerste Divisie	11th	–	2008–09	third round
2007–08 Eerste Divisie	18th	–	2007–08	round of 16
2006–07 Eerste Divisie	20th	–	2006–07	second round
2005–06 Eerste Divisie	10th	promotion/relegation play-offs: no promotion	2005–06	third round
2004–05 Eerste Divisie	10th	–	2004–05	second round
2003–04 Eerste Divisie	10th	–	2003–04	second round
1970–71 Tweede Divisie	9th	return to amateur football	1970–71	first round
1969–70 Tweede Divisie	15th	–	1969–70	round of 16
1968–69 Tweede Divisie	17th	–	1968–69	first round
1967–68 Tweede Divisie	17th	–	1967–68	group stage
1966–67 Tweede Divisie	21st	–	1966–67	did not participate
1965–66 Tweede Divisie	11th (group A)	–	1965–66	group stage
1964–65 Tweede Divisie	2nd (group A)	promotion competition: no promotion	1964–65	first round
1963–64 Tweede Divisie	8th (group B)	–	1963–64	first round
1962–63 Tweede Divisie	2nd (group A)	promotion competition: no promotion	1962–63	first round
1961–62 Eerste Divisie	8th (group A)	Tweede Divisie (relegation)	1961–62	?
1960–61 Eerste Divisie	16th (group A)	–	1960–61	?
1959–60 Eerste Divisie	9th (group B)	–	not held	not held
1958–59 Eerste Divisie	3rd (group A)	–	1958–59	?
1957–58 Eerste Divisie	14th (group A)	–	1957–58	?
1956–57 Eerste Divisie	15th (group B)	–	1956–57	?

== Vitesse/AGOVV Youth Academy ==
The Vitesse/AGOVV Voetbalacademie (English: Vitesse/AGOVV Youth Academy) was officially founded in 2005, when the youth academies of AGOVV and Vitesse merged. The newly formed academy received the official regional youth academy status from the KNVB and was based on the structure of the former Vitesse youth academy, with the addition of various AGOVV youth players and staff members. The cooperation between AGOVV and Vitesse was terminated as of July 2013, where the academy continued solely as Vitesse's youth academy.

== Former players ==
=== National team players ===
The following players were called up to represent their national teams in international football and received caps during their tenure with AGOVV:

- Armenia
- (Armenia) Edgar Manucharyan (2010)
  Curaçao
- (Curaçao) Raynick Damasco (2011–2012)
- (Curaçao) Djuric Winklaar (2004–2006) (Note: Djuric Winklaar represented Netherlands Antilles internationally, prior to the countries dissolution in 2010, with Curaçao considered by both UEFA and FIFA as the only inherit successor to the national team of former Netherlands Antilles.)
  Netherlands
- (Netherlands) Jo Kluin (1926–1940)
- (Netherlands) Gep Landaal (1914–1937)
- (Netherlands) Mauk Weber (1935–1938)

- Years in brackets indicate careerspan with AGOVV.

== Famous former managers ==
- (Netherlands) Peter Bosz
- (Netherlands) Stanley Menzo
- (Netherlands) John van den Brom
- (Netherlands) Jurrie Koolhof
- (England) Keith Spurgeon

== See also ==
- Dutch football league teams
