= Berg en Bos =

Coordinates: 52°13′N 5°56′E

Berg en Bos is a residential area on a former farm in the Dutch city of Apeldoorn. In this part are Park Berg en Bos with Apenheul and Sportpark Berg en Bos.

== Description ==
The district Berg en Bos is in the west part of Apeldoorn and is 163 acres in size, including more than 300 hectares of woodland. It is bordered by the N344 road (Amersfoortseweg) Jachtlaan and Asselsestraat. JC Wils Avenue divides the area diagonally in half and forms the southwest boundary of the residential area. It has about 2,100 inhabitants and stems largely from the 1930s. Typically, the spacious layout with 'meandering' lanes, a special arrangement of the buildings and the still omnipresent afforestation. The district is often compared to the residential areas in Blaricum and Laren in the Gooi.

"Berg and Bosch" is the name of the former estate of the Antwerp merchant J.C. Wils. He became rich in the timber trade, and bought from the end of the nineteenth century areas of wasteland. The grounds were mainly planted with pine, which was used as pitprops for mining. Wils also built on the property some villas, which were mostly rented out. In the early twentieth century the estate was sold to the city of Apeldoorn and then parceled out for villa construction.

== Berg en Bos village ==
Typical of the buildings, the architecture, and architects such as Gerrit Rietveld, Wildschut and the Apeldoorn inhabitants Chris and Henk Wegerif have made important contributions. Central to the construction of the district was living in a park setting. In the greenery are many bird species present and the gardens are regularly visited by squirrels, hedgehogs, foxes and sometimes wild boar or badger. On the north side of the district until the thirties was the sanatorium Berg en Bosch; here tuberculosis patients could be cured in the fresh air. The institution moved in 1933 to Bilthoven.

In Orderbos, a forest area southwest of the district, in the thirties Park Berg & Bos was set up. In this park the early seventies Apenheul was constructed. Further south is Sportpark Berg en Bos, including the home of the football club AGOVV. On the north side of Berg en Bos is the amusement park Koningin Juliana Toren.

== History ==
Amersfoortseweg, Valkenberglaan and Jachtlaan, like Koning Lodewijklaan, Loolaan en Zwolseweg, are based on a star-shaped forest that originated about 1750. Habitation was hardly there. The precursors of these roads were straight paths that came together at the Valkenberg with a path to Het Loo Palace. Other paths, some of which can still be seen on aerial photographs, were part of this system. The Valkenberg, a rise that was used for falconry and as a gallows hill, was from the 19th century found to be macabre and was hidden by planting. In 2009, the hill is hidden and line-of-sight avenues show little of it.

== School ==
There is a primary school Berg en Bosschool in the district, housed in a building dating from 1932 that has the status of national monument.
