= Silvolde =

- Village
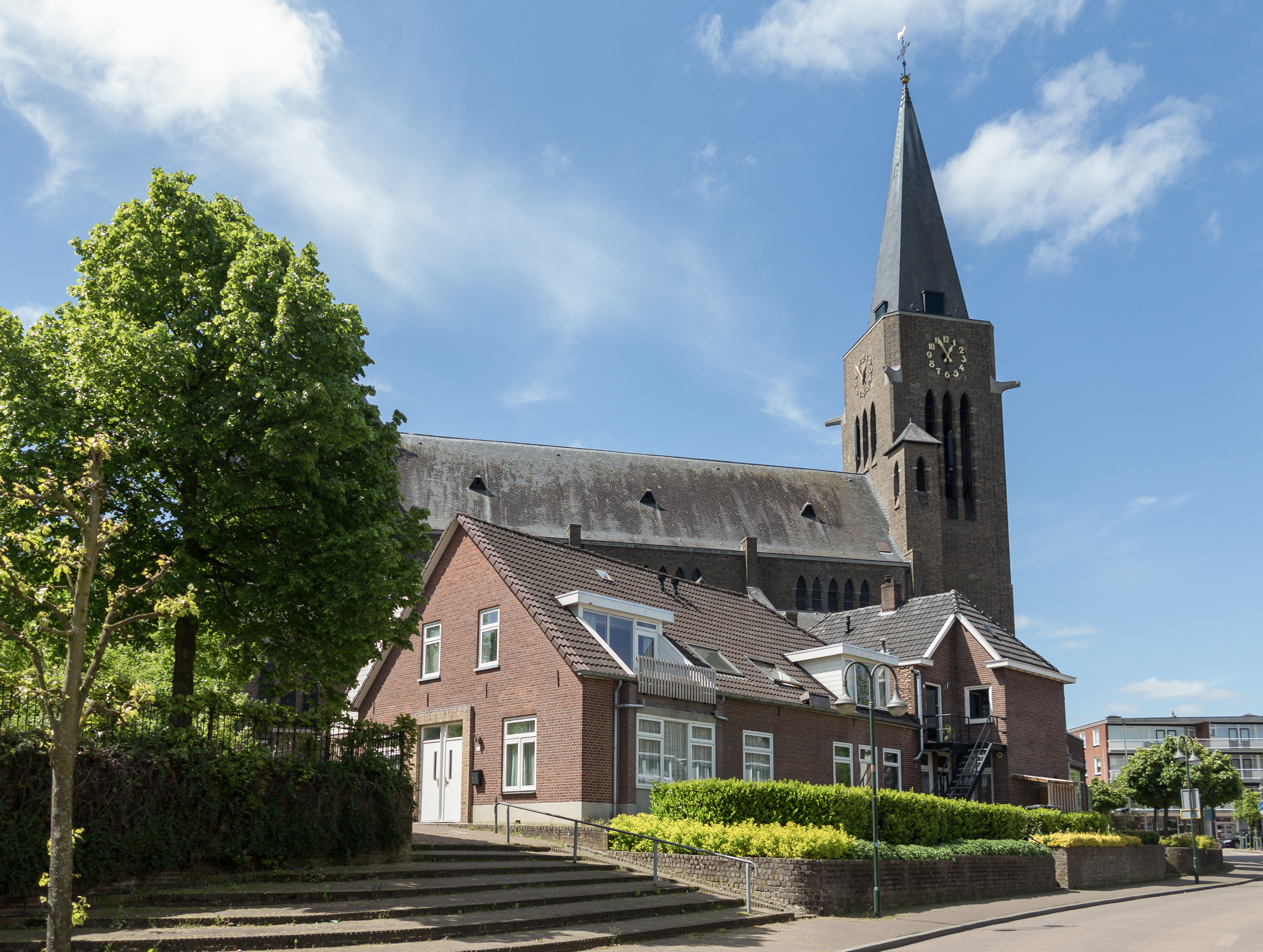
- Church: the Sint Mauritiuskerk

- Location in the Netherlands Silvolde (Netherlands)
- Coordinates: 51°54′37″N 6°23′1″E
- Country: Netherlands
- Province: Gelderland
- Municipality: Oude IJsselstreek

Area
  - Total: 11.98 km^{2} (4.63 sq mi)
- Elevation: 17 m (56 ft)

Population (2021)
  - Total: 5,220
  - Density: 436/km^{2} (1,130/sq mi)
- Time zone: UTC+1 (CET)
  - Summer (DST): UTC+2 (CEST)
- Postal code: 7064
- Dialing code: 0315

Silvolde (West Low German: Sillevolde) is a village in the Achterhoek and is part of the municipality Oude IJsselstreek.

== School ==
There are several schools in Silvolde, those are:

- de Plakkenberg (elementary school)
- de Bontebrugschool (elementary school)
- Bluemers (high school)
- Laudis (high school)
- Isala (high school)

== Notable people from Silvolde ==
- Wim Mager (1940-2008), director of the Apenheul Primate Park
- Arne Jansen (1951-2007), singer
- Tom van der Lee (1964), politician

== Gallery ==
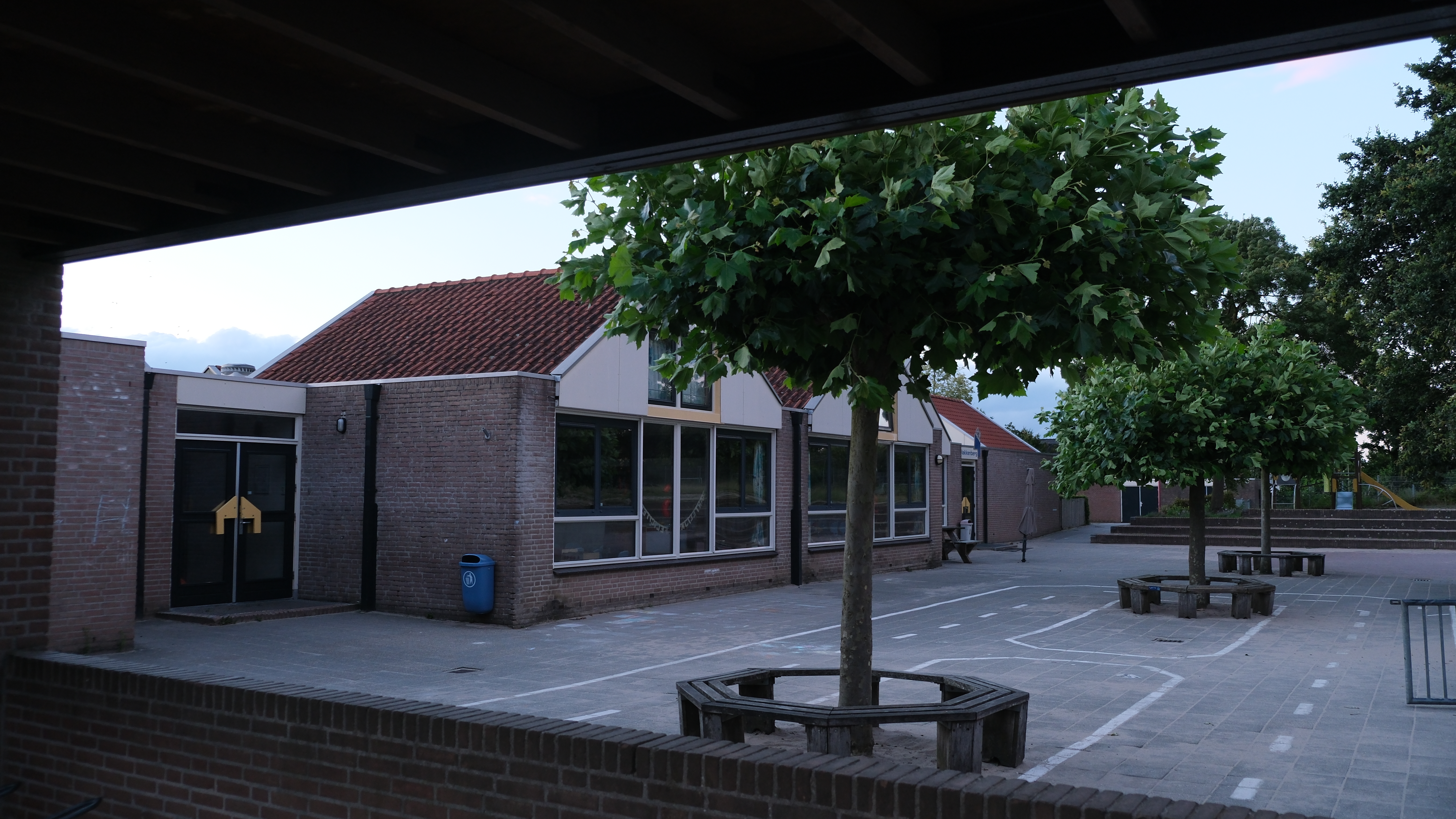
Plakkenberg school

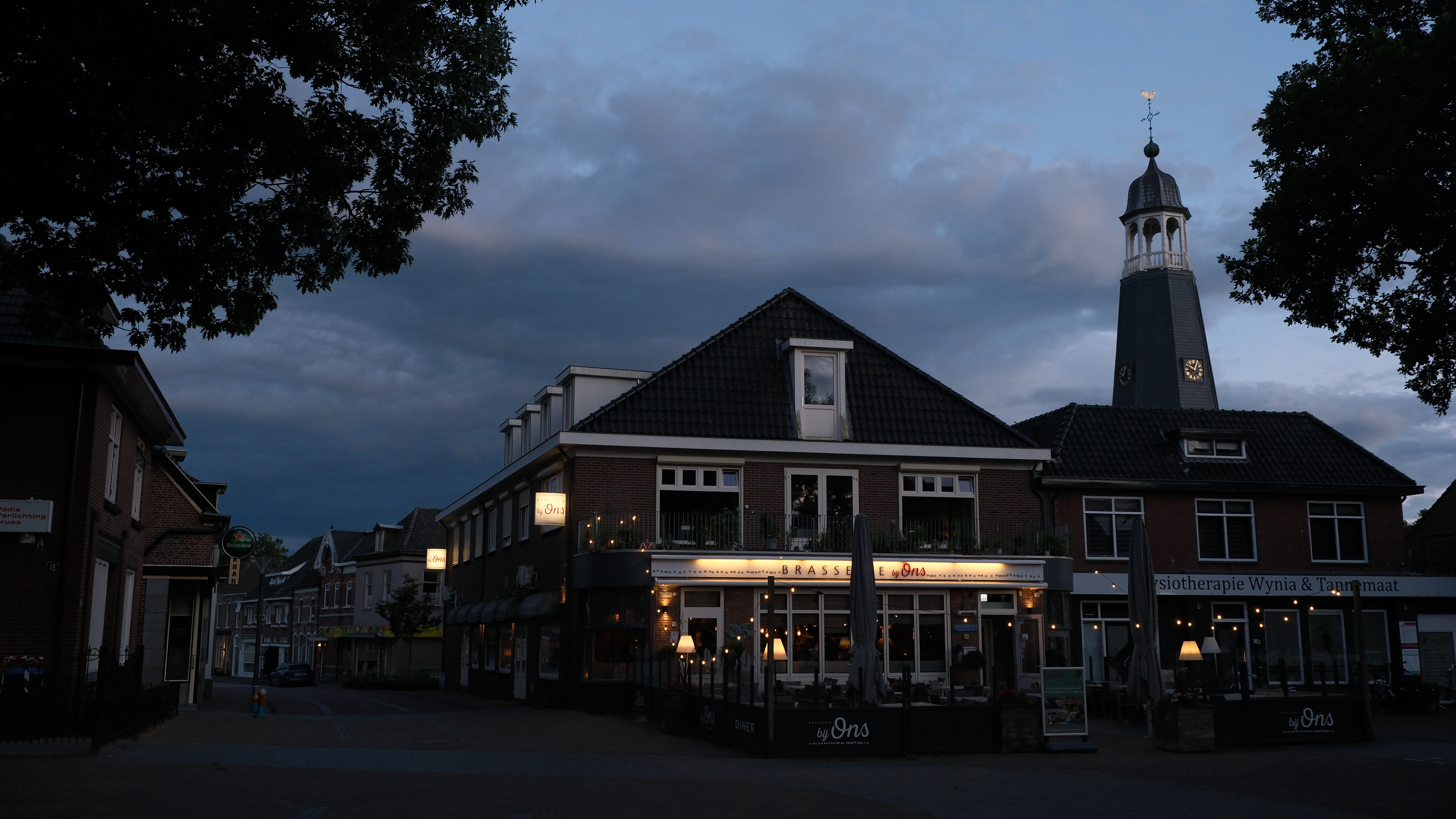
Market

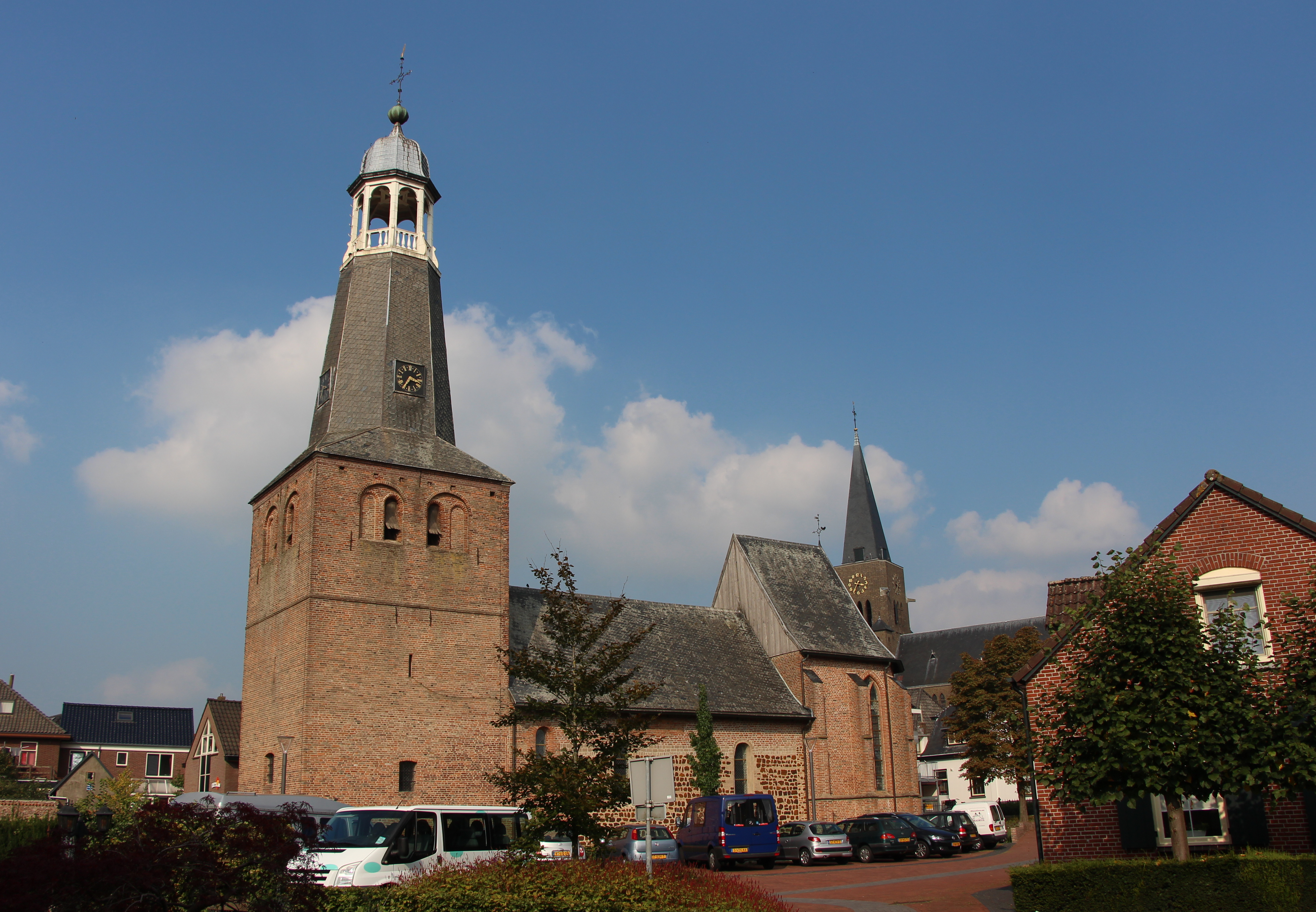
Old Mauritius church

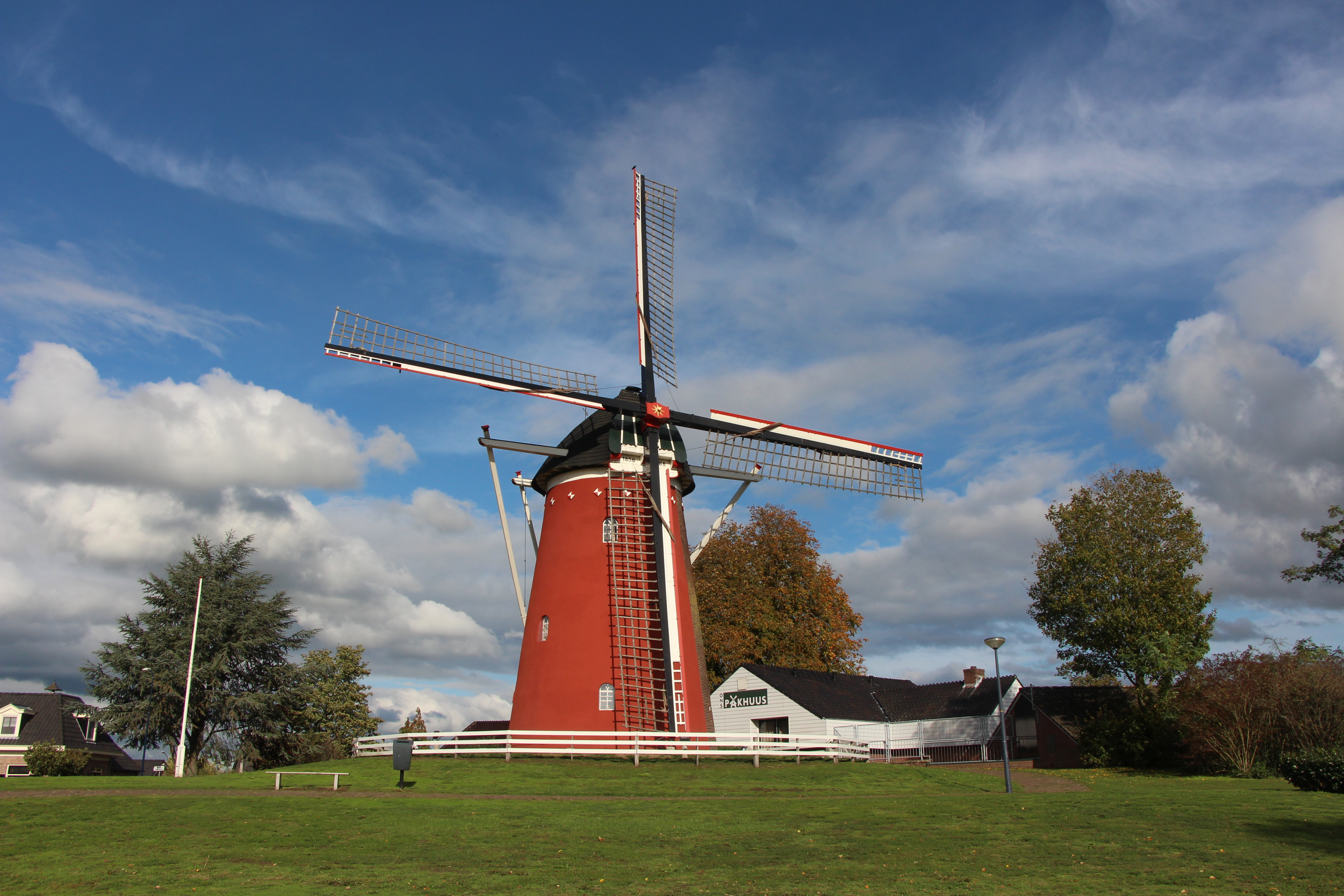
Gerritsen's Windmill

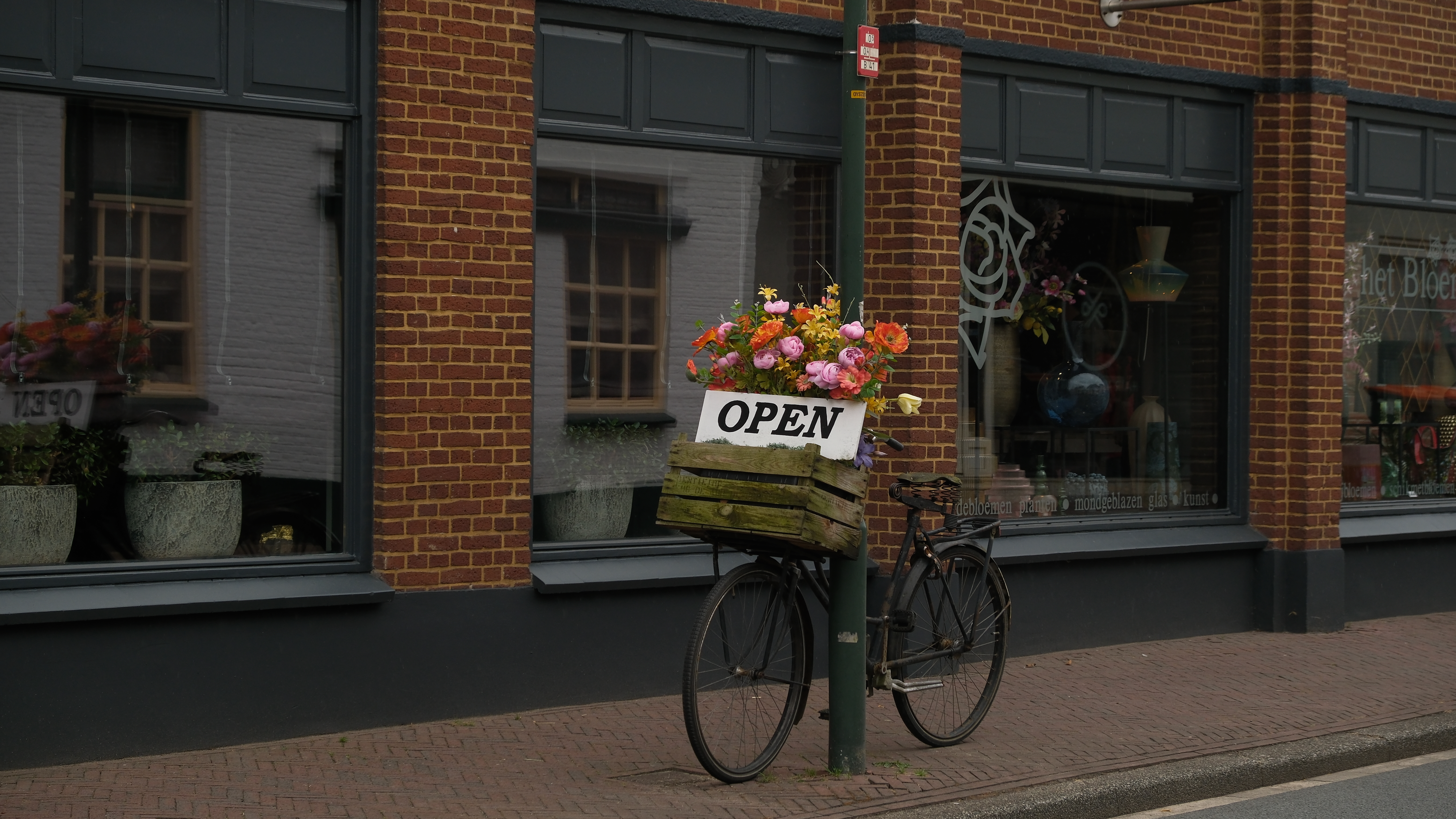
Flower shop

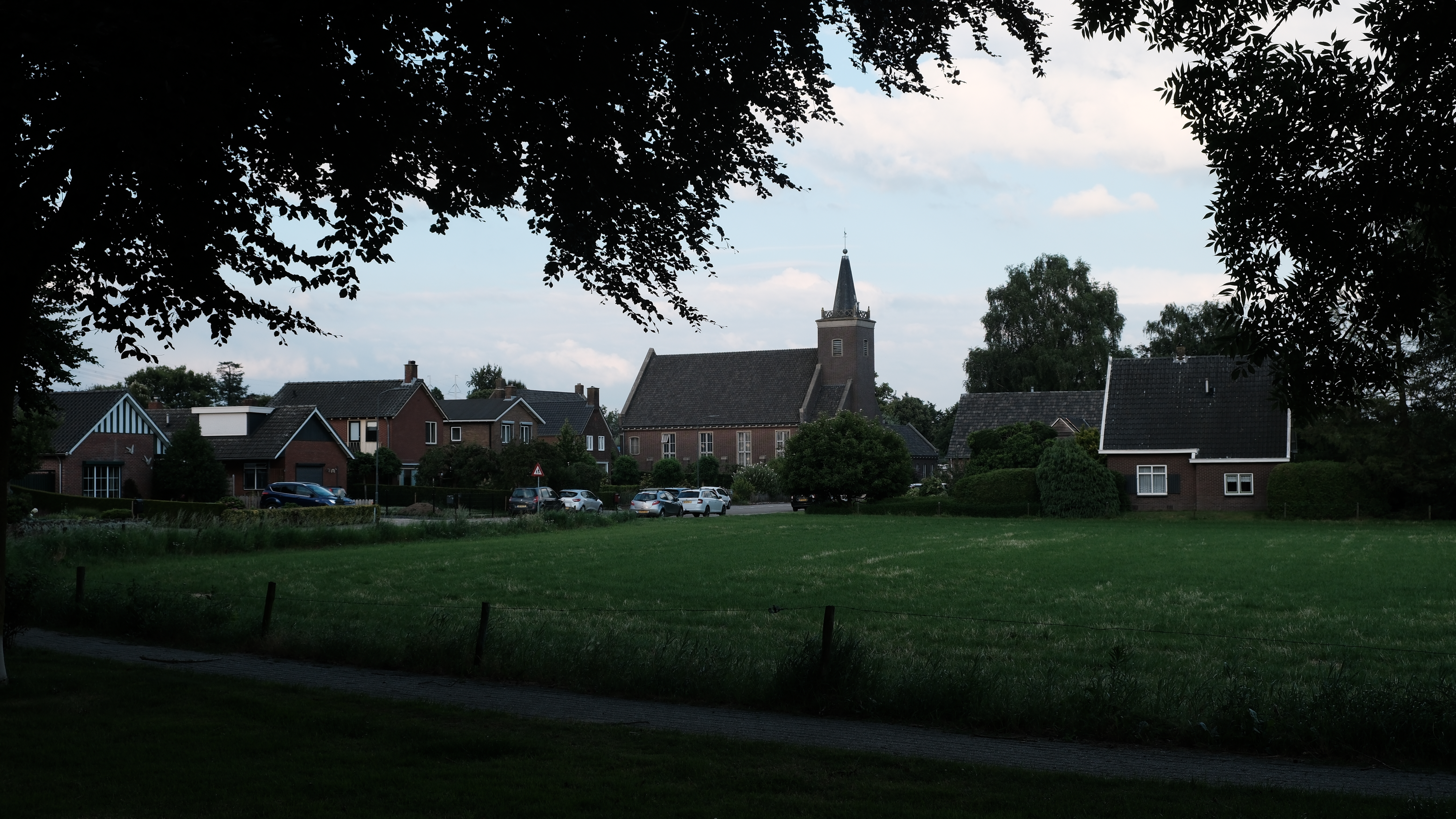
Bontebrug with former church

== External information ==
- Old Sillevold - Hymnical association from Silvolde (dutch)
