= Wim Mager =

Dutch photographer

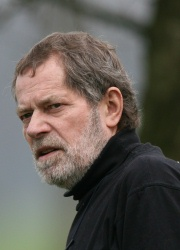
Wim Mager

Wim Mager (26 September 1940 in Rotterdam – 23 March 2008 in Silvolde) was a Dutch photographer who is mainly known for founding the Apenheul Primate Park near Apeldoorn of which he was the director until 1997. When he had found a successor he moved to France and started a similar primate park near Poitiers called La Vallée des Singes.

Apenheul was the result of an out of control hobby. Mager had two small monkeys as a pet but when the pair got children one thing led to another. His ideal was starting a primate park where the primates would not be kept in cages but could walk free among the people. Apenheul was the first park of its kind in the world. Bert de Boer, the later director of Apenheul called him a "pionier of the zoo world".

Mager died on the first Easter day in 2008 at 67 years of age after having been ill for some time. He twice had a stroke, the last heavy one a week before his death.
