= Romagne, Vienne =

Romagne
- Commune
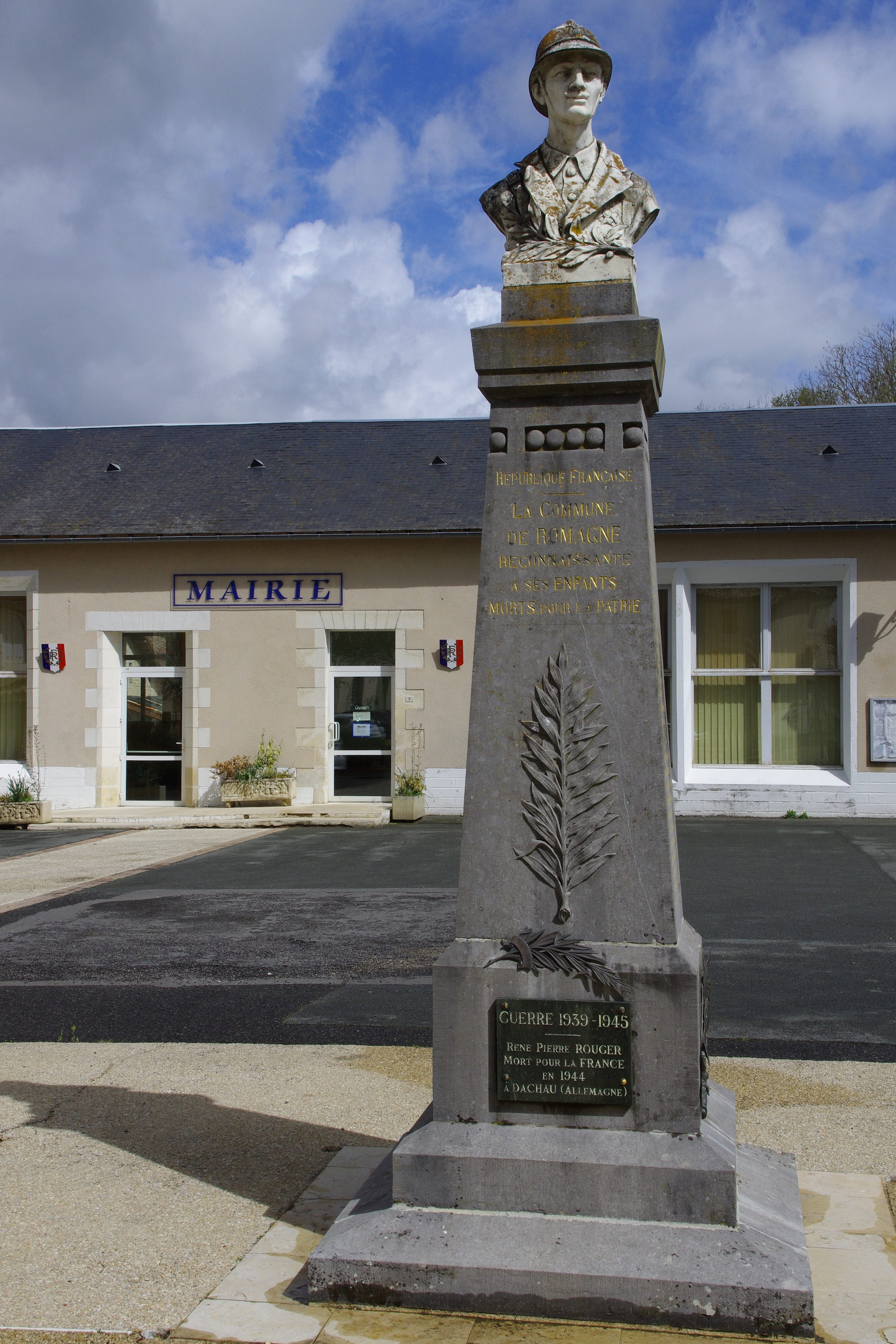
- The town hall and war memorial in Romagne
- Location of Romagne
- Location within France Location within Nouvelle-Aquitaine
- Coordinates: 46°16′16″N 0°18′11″E
- Country: France
- Region: Nouvelle-Aquitaine
- Department: Vienne
- Arrondissement: Montmorillon
- Canton: Lusignan

Government
  - Mayor (2020–2026): Jean-Pierre Maury
- Area^{1}: 40.84 km^{2} (15.77 sq mi)
- Elevation: 135 m (443 ft)
- Highest elevation: 150 m (490 ft)
- Lowest elevation: 103 m (338 ft)
- Population (2023): 801
  - Density: 19.6/km^{2} (50.8/sq mi)
- Time zone: UTC+01:00 (CET)
  - Summer (DST): UTC+02:00 (CEST)
- INSEE/Postal code: 86211 /86700
- ^{1} French Land Register data, which excludes lakes, ponds, glaciers > 1 km^{2} (0.386 sq mi or 247 acres) and river estuaries.

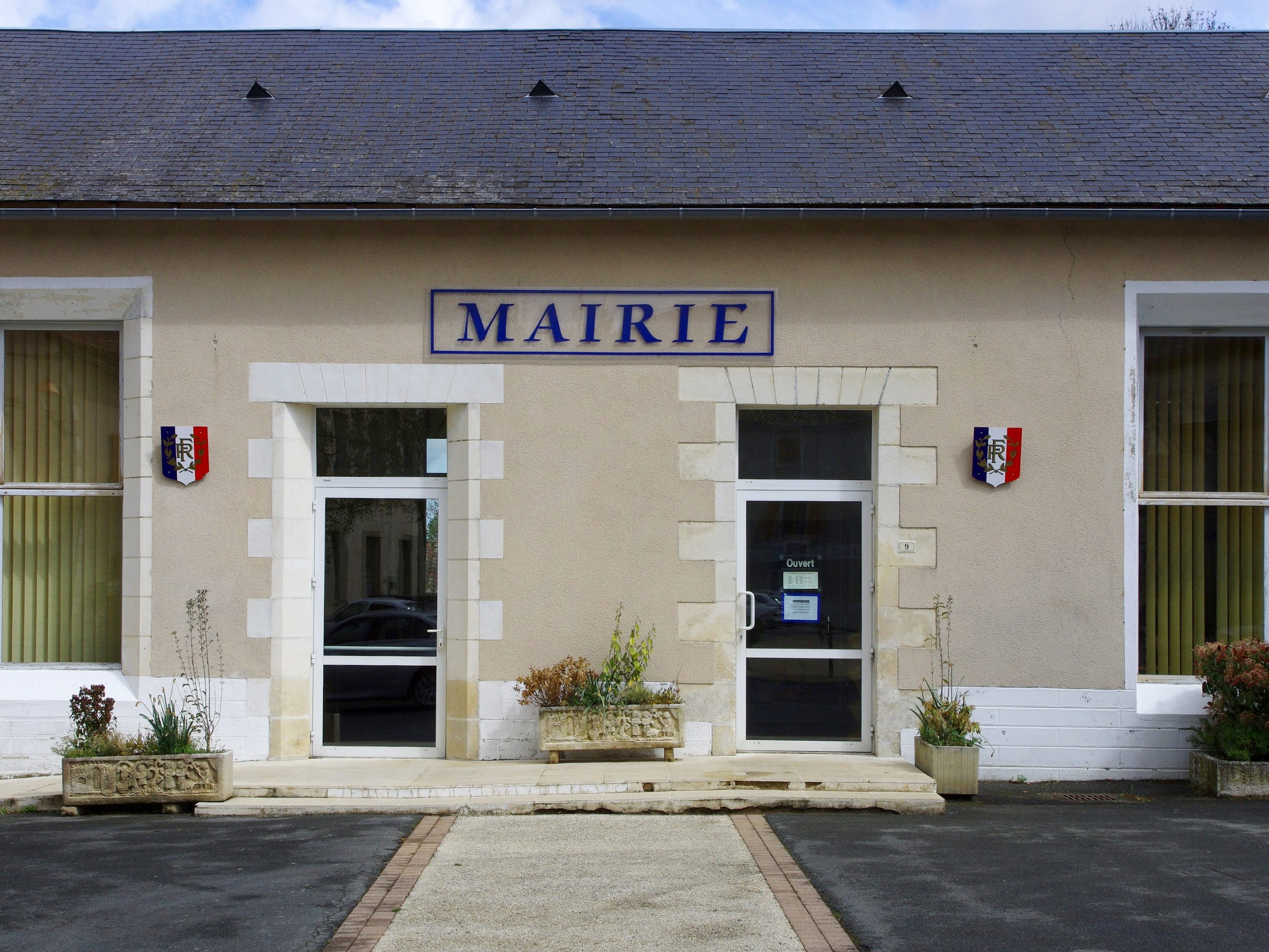

Romagne (French pronunciation: [ʁɔmaɲ]) is a commune in the Vienne department in the Nouvelle-Aquitaine region in western France.

== Points of Interest ==
- La Vallée des Singes - zoo dedicated to Primates is in this commune.

== See also ==
- Communes of the Vienne department
