= Tom van der Lee =

Dutch politician (born 1964)

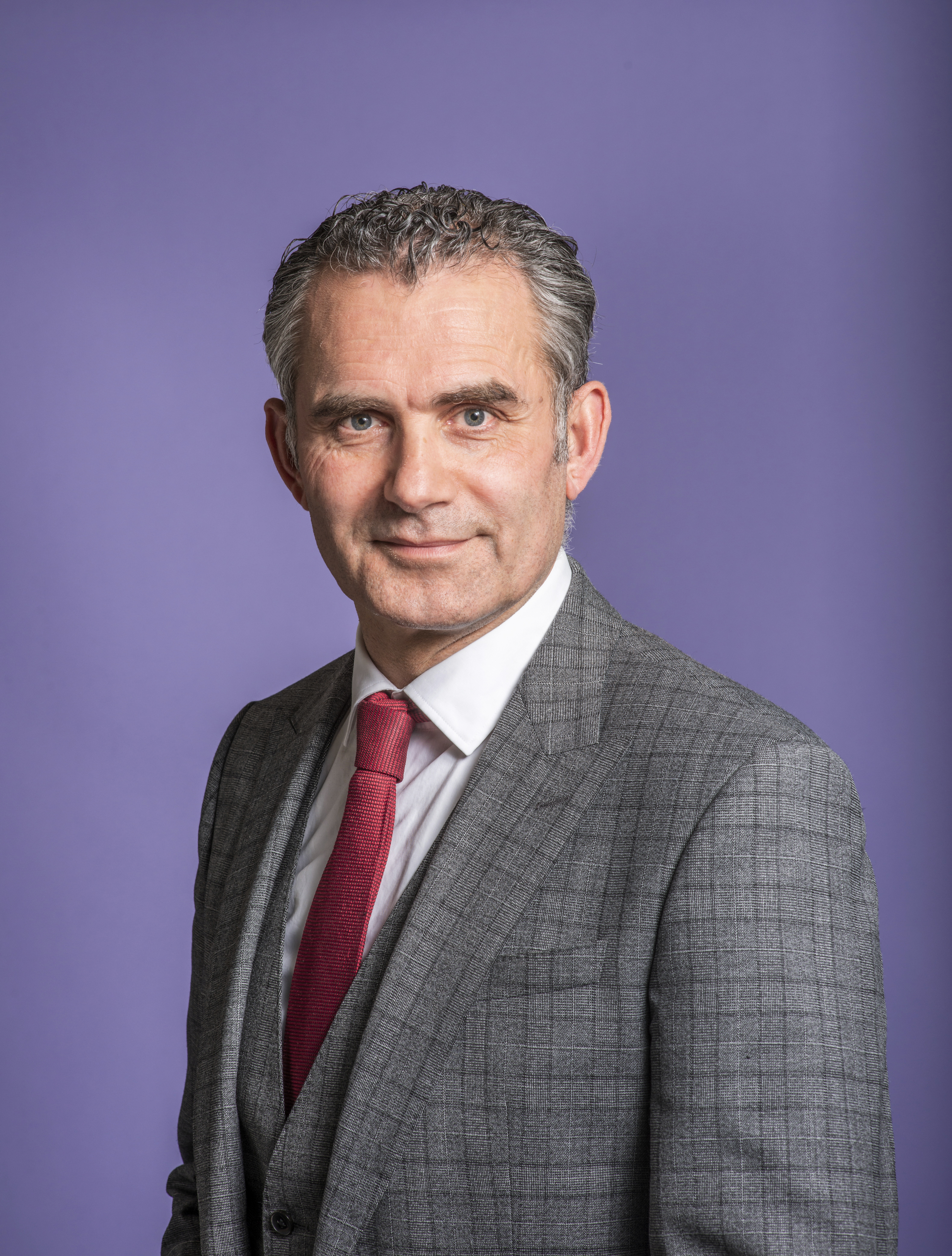
- van der Lee in 2020

Member of the House of Representatives
- Incumbent
- Assumed office 23 March 2017

Personal details
- Born: 9 July 1964 (age 62) Silvolde, Oude IJsselstreek, Netherlands
- Party: GroenLinks (until 2026); PRO (since 2026)

Tom van der Lee (born 9 July 1964) is a Dutch politician representing Progressief Nederland (PRO), formerly a member of GroenLinks, who has served in the House of Representatives since the 2017 general election. He was re-elected four years later, and he received a third term in the 2023 general election. Van der Lee's portfolio has subsequently included finances.

In December 2024, when finance minister Eelco Heinen intended to privatize De Volksbank, Van der Lee called on him through a motion to keep the bank, which had been nationalized in 2013 during the European debt crisis, state-owned. An overwhelming majority of the House adopted the motion, in which Van der Lee argued that the bank served a societal function because of its extensive network of locations and its sustainable investment portfolio.

== Electoral history ==
Electoral history of Tom van der Lee
Year	Body	Party	Pos.	Votes	Result		Ref.
Year	Body	Party	Pos.	Votes	Party seats	Individual	Ref.
2017	House of Representatives	GroenLinks	3	2,679	14	Won	
2021	House of Representatives	GroenLinks	3	3,173	8	Won	
2023	House of Representatives	GroenLinks–PvdA	9	3,561	25	Won	
2025	House of Representatives	GroenLinks–PvdA	16	1,223	20	Won	

== See also ==
- List of members of the House of Representatives of the Netherlands, 2023–present
