= La Vallée des Singes =

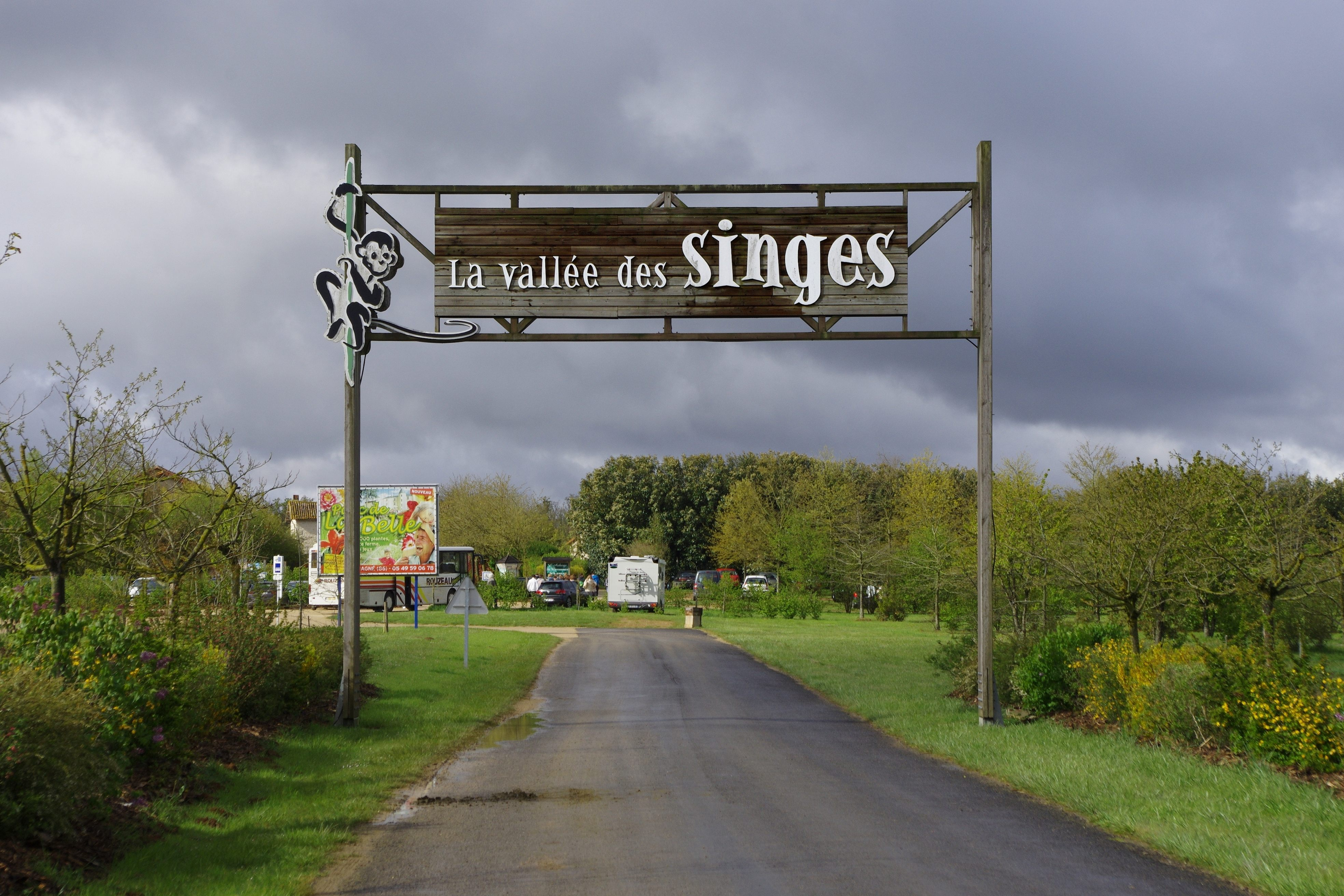
- Entrance
- Interactive map of La Vallée des Singes
- 46.24270°N 0.2896°E
- Location: Romagne, France
- Memberships: EAZA
- Website: www.la-vallee-des-singes.fr

La Vallée des Singes ("The Valley of the Monkeys") is a primate park in Romagne, France.

== History ==
La Vallée des Singes was founded by Wim Mager who had previously founded the Apenheul Primate Park in the Netherlands in 1971, which is the first free-roaming primate park in the world. The park, well known for its three species of great ape, first obtained gorillas in 1998, and first obtained its chimpanzees from the TNO in 2004. La Vallée des Singes is famous for its group of bonobos; with the largest group in captivity as of 2016 numbering at 20 individuals. The zoo has had five successful births for this critically endangered species.

== Animals ==
As of 2016, the park is home to 32 species of primate, including:

- Barbary macaques
- Black howler monkeys
- Black lemurs
- Black-and-white ruffed lemurs
- Black-capped squirrel monkeys
- Bonobos
- Brown spider monkeys
- Coppery titis
- Crowned lemurs
- Emperor tamarins
- Geladas
- Golden lion tamarins
- Golden-bellied capuchins
- Golden-headed lion tamarins
- Lesser spot-nosed monkeys
- Mandrills
- Mantled guerezas
- Pileated gibbons
- Pygmy marmosets
- Red ruffed lemurs
- Red-bellied lemurs
- Red-faced spider monkeys
- Red-handed tamarins
- Ring-tailed lemurs
- Roloway monkeys
- Silvery marmosets
- Southern white-cheeked gibbons
- Western chimpanzees
- Western lowland gorillas
- White-belted black-and-white ruffed lemurs
- White-faced saki monkeys
- White-fronted marmosets
- White-headed capuchins
- Woolly monkeys
