= Park Berg en Bos =

Nature reserve in the Netherlands

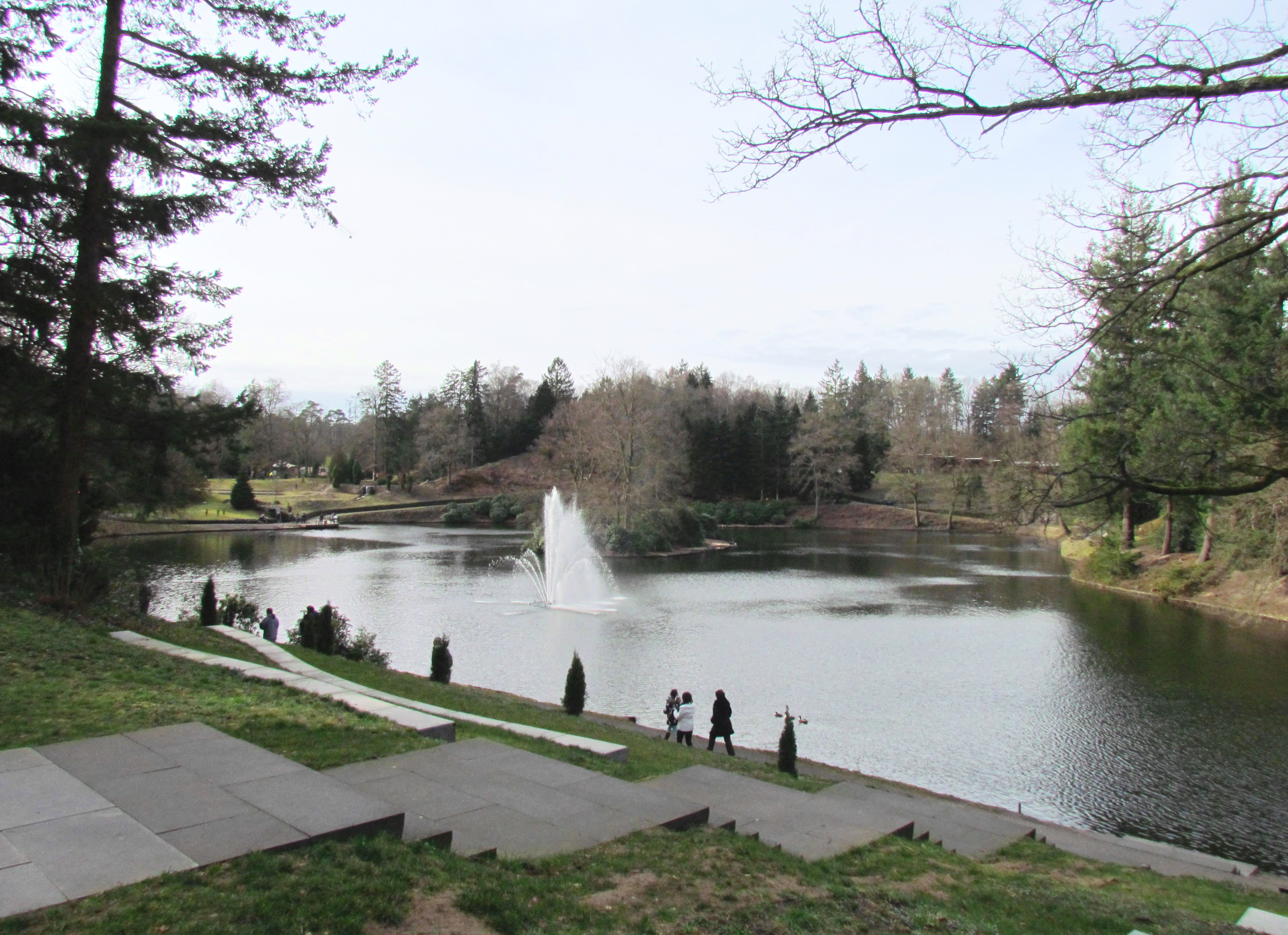
The forest pond

Nature Park Berg en Bos is a nature reserve of 250 hectares in the Apeldoorn village Berg en Bos in the Netherlands. The park is on the edge of the Veluwe hill area.

== History ==
Park Berg & Bos, owned by the municipality of Apeldoorn, was built in 1934. It was a job creation project in the crisis of the Great Depression. This place was, until the 19th century, a water supply to the water fountains and water of Het Loo Palace. From 1953 in evening 'Lumido' organized a music, water and light show in and around the forest pond in the park. 'Lumido' stopped in 2003 and restarted in August 2012.

== Themes ==
The park shows the characteristic of this area's plants and animals such as wild boar and red deer. As one penetrates deeper into Berg en Bos, the character gradually changes from a carefully landscaped park in an unspoilt but varied woodland. Along the trails in the park several routes are mapped out.

There are various recreational amenities such as a 26 meter high tower, a playground and a butterfly garden. The park also includes a zoo and a botanical garden. In the zoo Apenheul several monkeys live in the most natural conditions, and in the Pinetum different families of conifers are on display, including giant sequoias.

The park also has several archaeological sites, including the remains of burial mounds, iron pits and field fire ovens.

=== Forest pond ===
The area around the large forest pond, near the entrance, is beautifully landscaped with an abundance of flowering plants along the trails. By the forest pond is the Stone Bank where Queen Wilhelmina has painted.

=== Watchtower ===
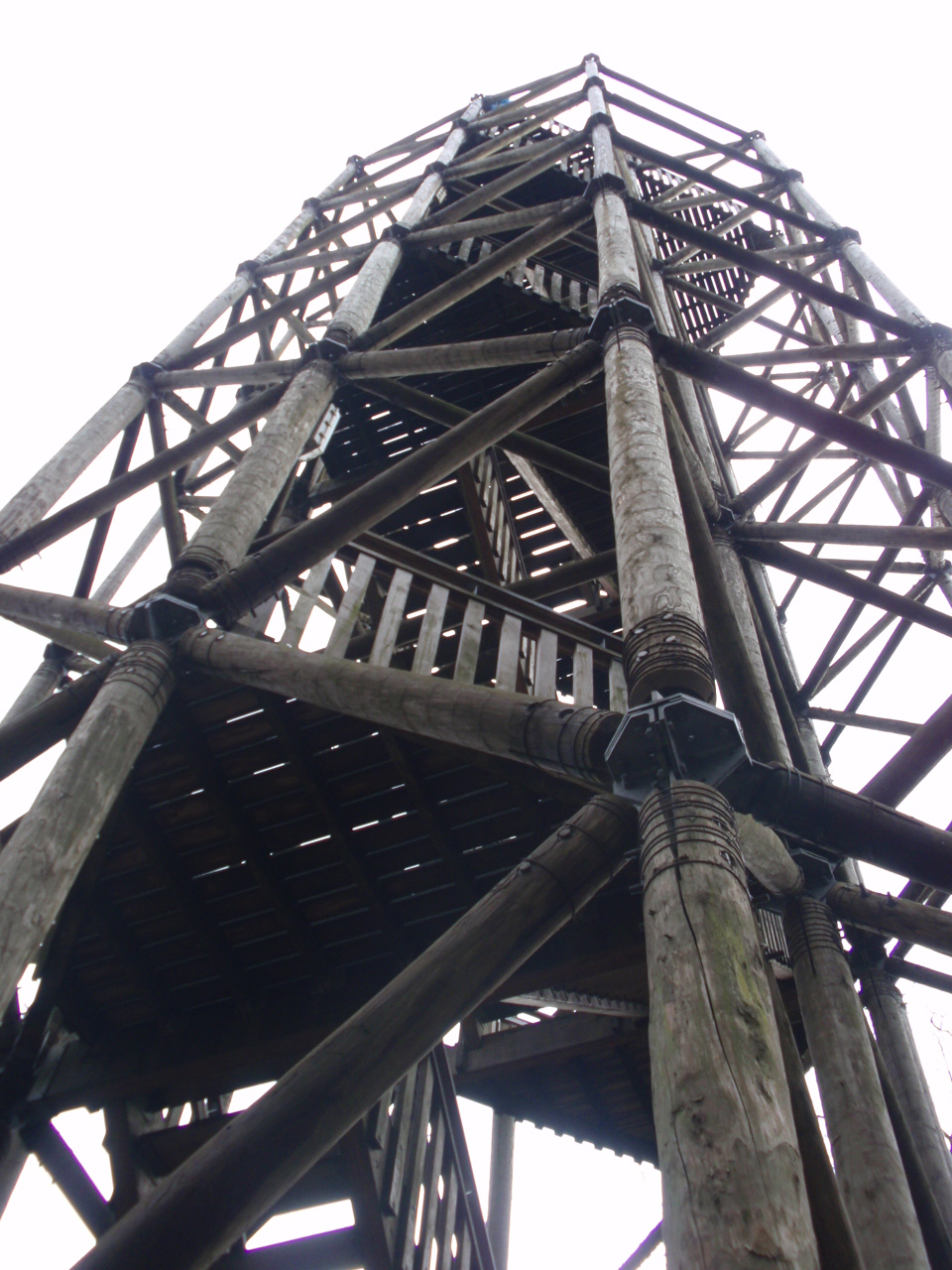
The watchtower

To the left of the path to Apenheul is an observation tower 26 meters high on a hill of 9 meters. From the top level of this tower is a magnificent panorama of Berg en Bos and the area around. On clear days the view reaches to Zwolle (about 40 km).

=== Playground ===
Left of the 'exit' to Apenheul is the playground. This is especially equipped for the young (and youngest) visitors. Along the edges of this large meadow are all kinds of climbing and play equipment. The playground is also suitable for picnics and groups of children.

=== Climbing forest ===
Beyond the playground is the climbing forest, where using ropes and platforms routes are plotted through the trees.

=== Butterfly garden ===
In 1997, the Association for Environmental Education created a butterfly garden in park Berg en Bos. In the garden grow various plants, attracting butterflies. On a sunny summer day there are native butterfly species as the small tortoiseshell, painted lady, peacock butterfly, common brimstone, map butterfly and others.
