= Djuric Winklaar =

Netherlands Antillean footballer (born 1982)

Personal information
- Full name: Djuric Jason Winklaar
- Date of birth: 3 January 1982 (age 44)
- Place of birth: Curaçao, Netherlands Antilles
- Height: 1.80 m (5 ft 11 in)
- Position: Midfielder

Senior career*
Years	Team	Apps	(Gls)
2000–2001	Heerenveen	10	(0)
2001–2004	Lecce	5	(0)
2002–2003	Sora	4	(0)
2003–2004	SPAL	2	(0)
2004–2006	AGOVV	44	(1)
2006–2009	Quick 1890		
2009–2010	Geinoord		
2010–2011	Veensche Boys		
2011–2015	Breukelen		

International career
2004–2008	Netherlands Antilles	9	(0)
- * Club domestic league appearances and goals

Djuric Winklaar (born 3 January 1982) is a Curaçaoan former professional footballer who played as a midfielder.

He played nine times for the Netherlands Antilles national team - eight of these were FIFA World Cup qualification matches and the other was an international friendly against Venezuela.

== Club career ==
Winklaar started his career with SC Heerenveen before moving to Italian side Lecce for a fee of €1.55 million. He later moved on to play for SPAL as well as for AGOVV in the Eerste Divisie.

In June 2010 he joined Dutch amateur side Veensche Boys from fellow amateurs Geinoord. A year later, he moved on to FC Breukelen, where he remained until the end of his career in 2015. His profession now is electrician.
