= Mauk Weber =

Dutch footballer

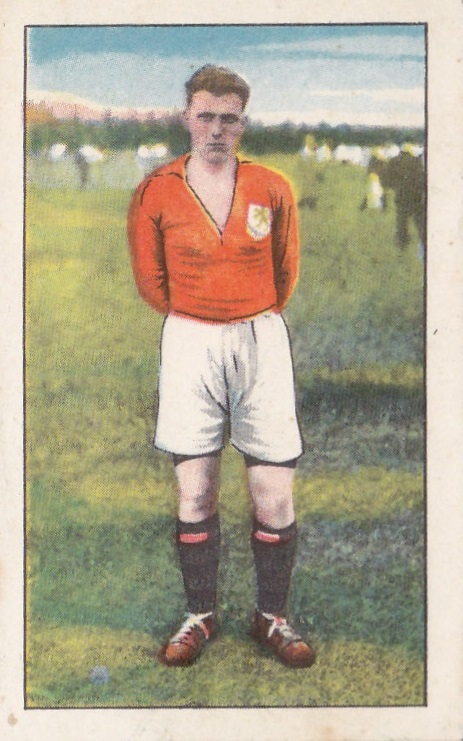
- Weber (1931)

Personal information
- Date of birth: 1 March 1914
- Place of birth: The Hague, Netherlands
- Date of death: 14 April 1978 (aged 64)
- Place of death: The Hague, Netherlands
- Position: Defender

Senior career*
Years	Team	Apps	(Gls)
1930–1934	ADO Den Haag		
1935–1937	AGOVV		
1937–1939	ADO Den Haag		

International career
1931–1938	Netherlands	27	(0)
- * Club domestic league appearances and goals

Bartholomeus Maurits Mauk Weber (1 March 1914 - 14 April 1978) was a Dutch football defender who played for Netherlands in the 1934 and 1938 FIFA World Cups. He also played for ADO Den Haag.
