= Raynick Damasco =

Curaçaoan footballer (born 1991)

Personal information
- Date of birth: 7 March 1991 (age 35)
- Place of birth: Amsterdam, Netherlands
- Position: Defender

Youth career
- 2006–2007: Amstelveen/Heemraad
- 2007–2010: Jong Vitesse/AGOVV

Senior career*
| Years | Team | Apps | (Gls) |
| 2010–2011 | Vitesse | 0 | (0) |
| 2011–2012 | AGOVV | 0 | (0) |
| 2013–2018 | JOS Watergraafsmeer | | |
| 2018–2019 | HBOK | | |

International career
| 2011 | Curaçao | 2 | (0) |
- * Club domestic league appearances and goals

Raynick Damasco (born 7 March 1991) is a Curaçaoan retired footballer who played as a defender.

== Club career ==
Damasco came from the Jong Vitesse/AGOVV academy and joined the seniors of AGOVV in October 2011. He later played on amateur level for JOS Watergraafsmeer and HBOK between 2013 and 2018.

== International career ==
He made his international debut for Curaçao in 2011, and has appeared in FIFA World Cup qualifying matches.
