= Koningin Juliana Toren =

Amusement park in the Netherlands

Julianatoren
- Queen Juliana Tower
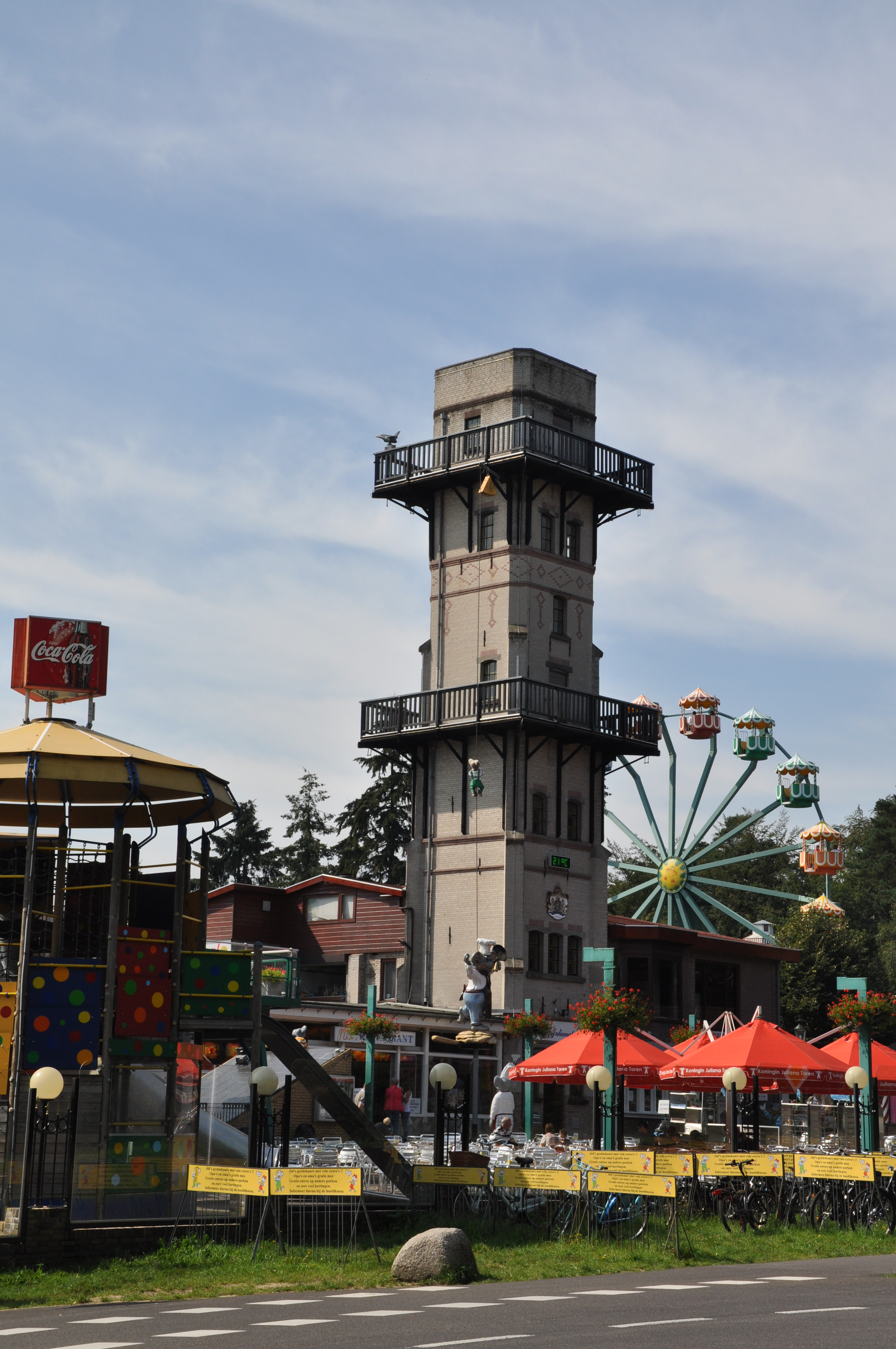
- Interactive map of Julianatoren
- Type: Amusement park
- Location: Apeldoorn, Netherlands
- Coordinates: 52.227°N 5.916°E
- Opened: 1910
- Visitors: 490.000 (2013)
- Status: Open all year round
- Website: www.julianatoren.nl

Julianatoren (English: Juliana Tower) is an amusement park located in the municipality of Apeldoorn, in the Netherlands. The park is built around the Queen Juliana Tower, which was built in 1910, and is currently a rijksmonument (listed building). The tower was built next to Het Loo Palace, to celebrate the birth of Queen Juliana of the Netherlands at the palace in 1909. Originally the tower was called Prinses Juliana Toren (Princess Juliana Tower) between 1910 and 1948, with an interval during the Second World War between 1940 and 1945 when it was called Juliana Toren (Juliana Tower). The park received 450,000 visitors in 2009.

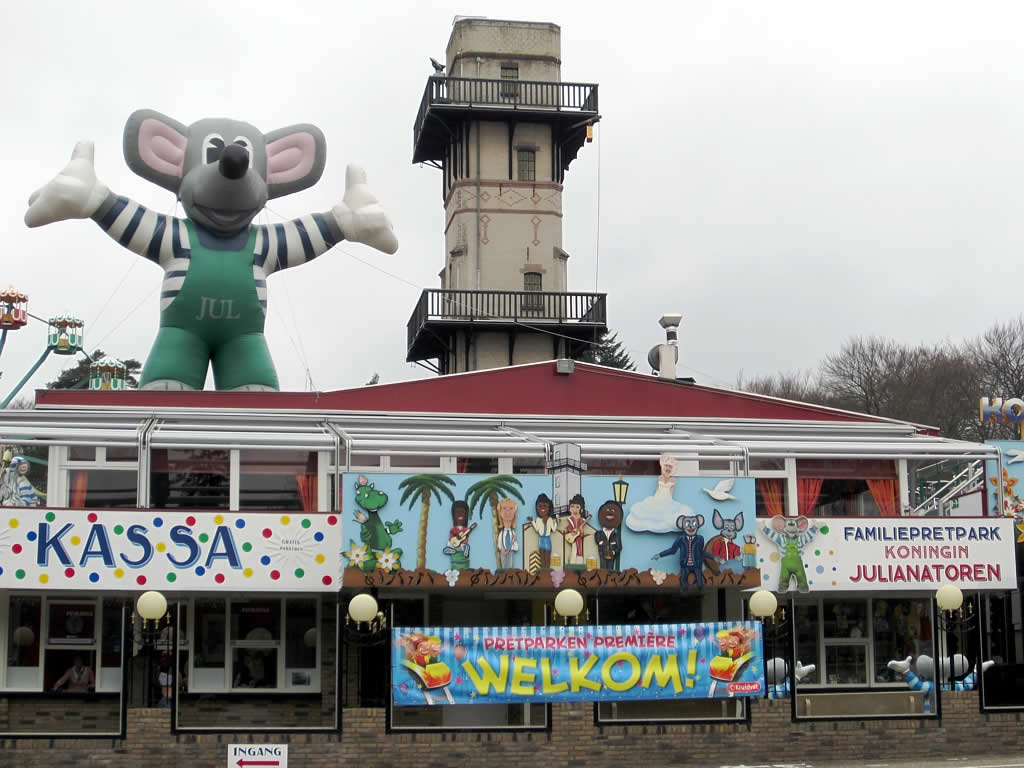
Entry to the park

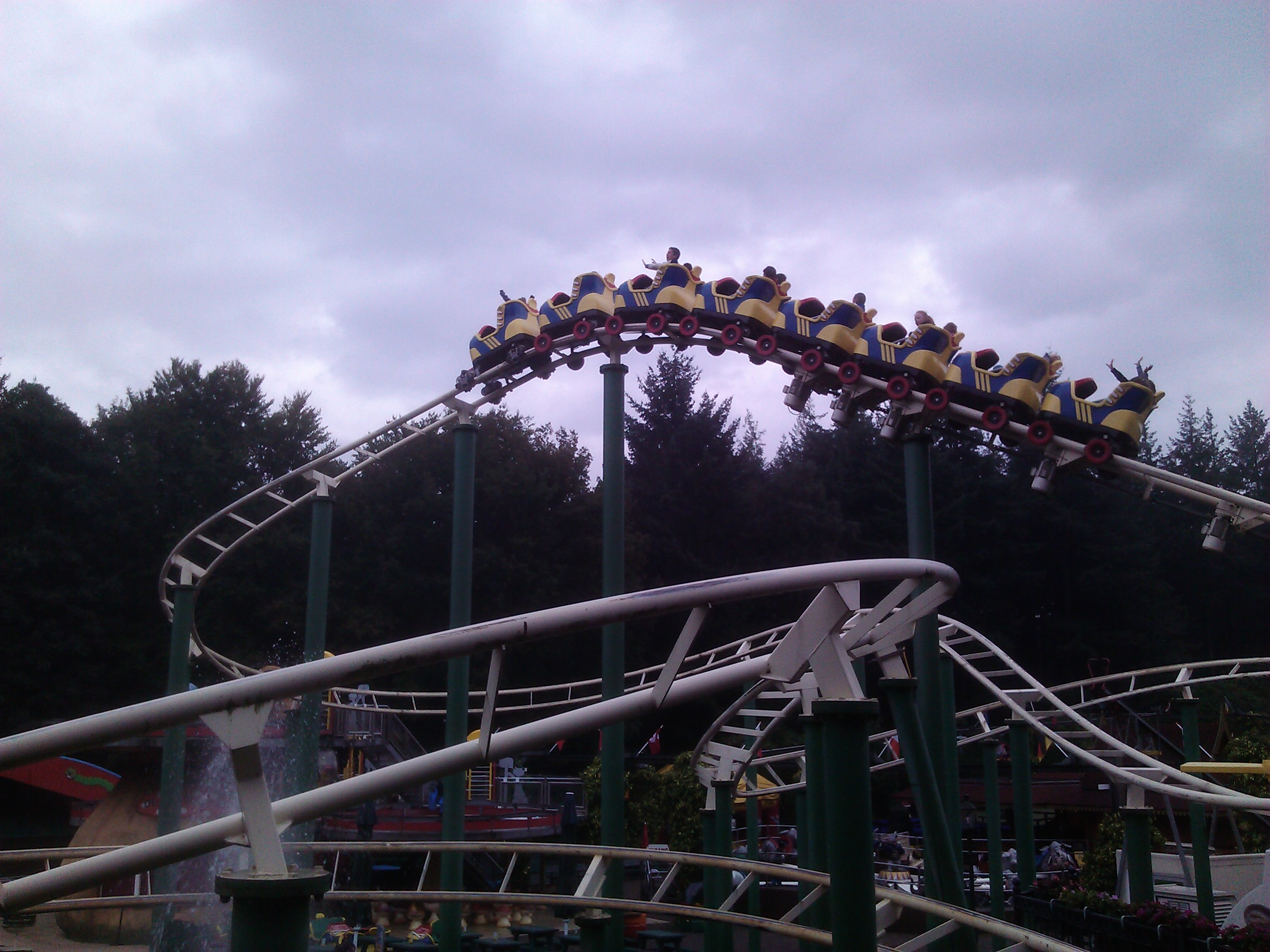
Super Achtbaan

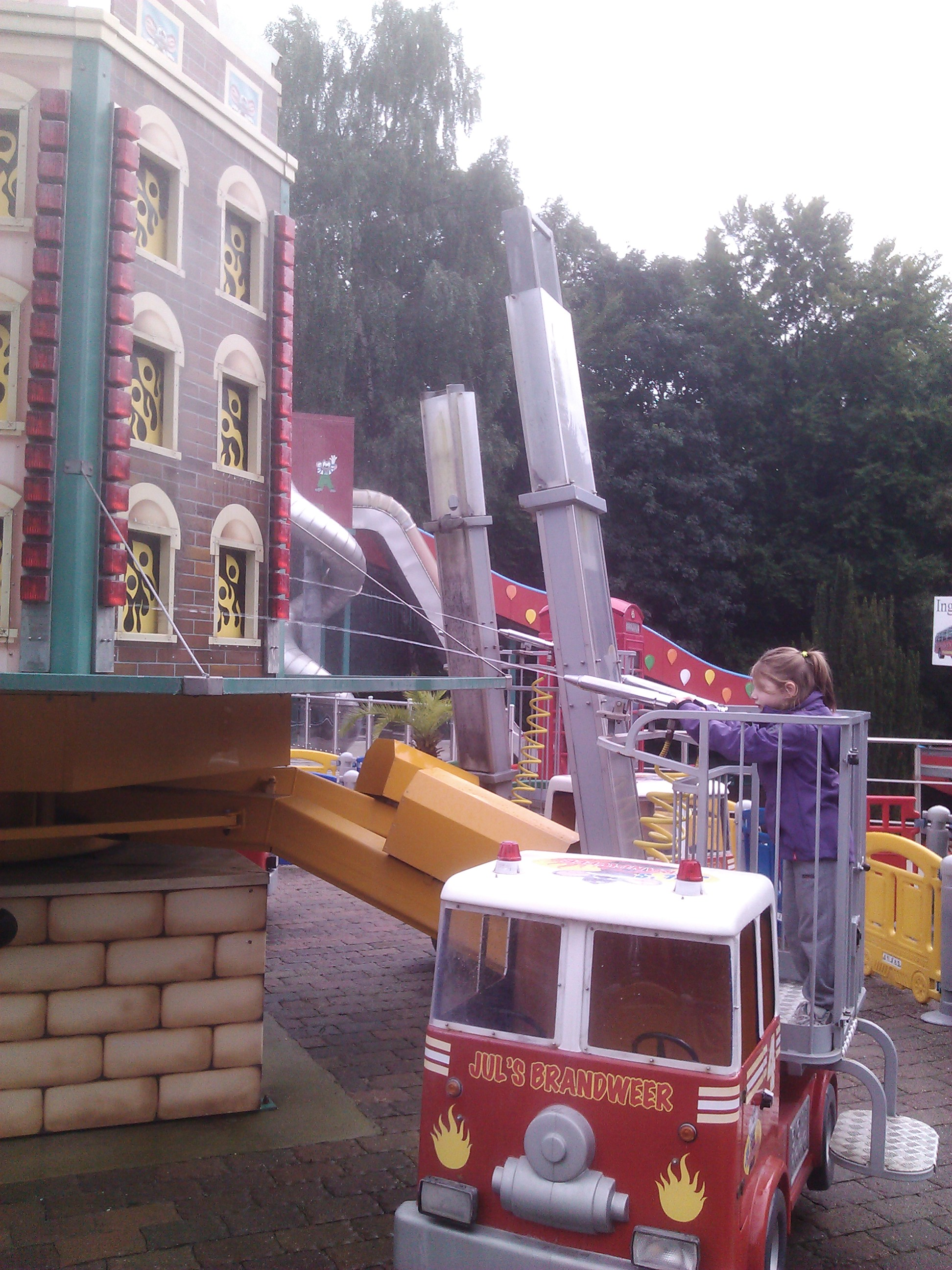
Brandweerspel

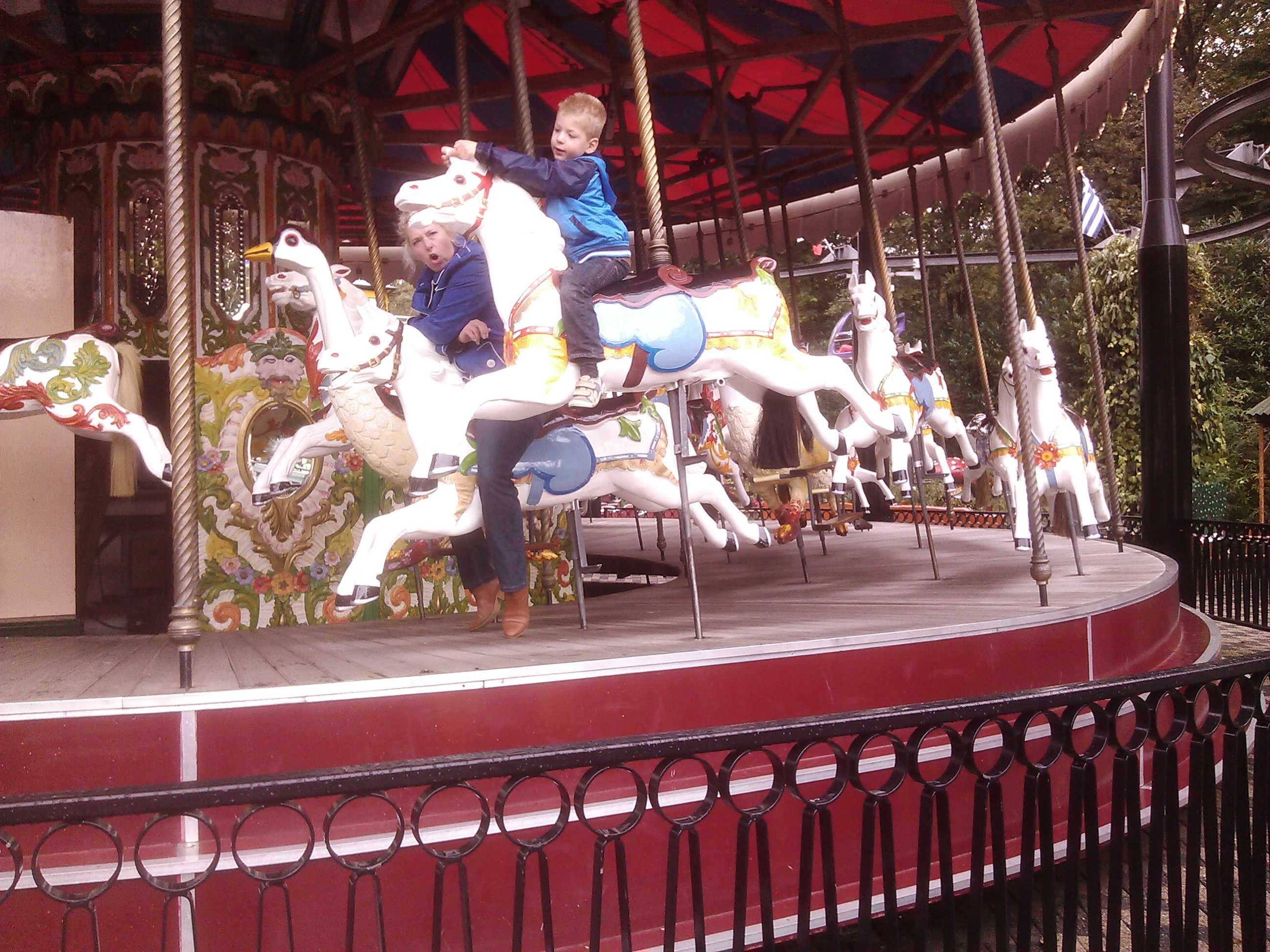
Carousel

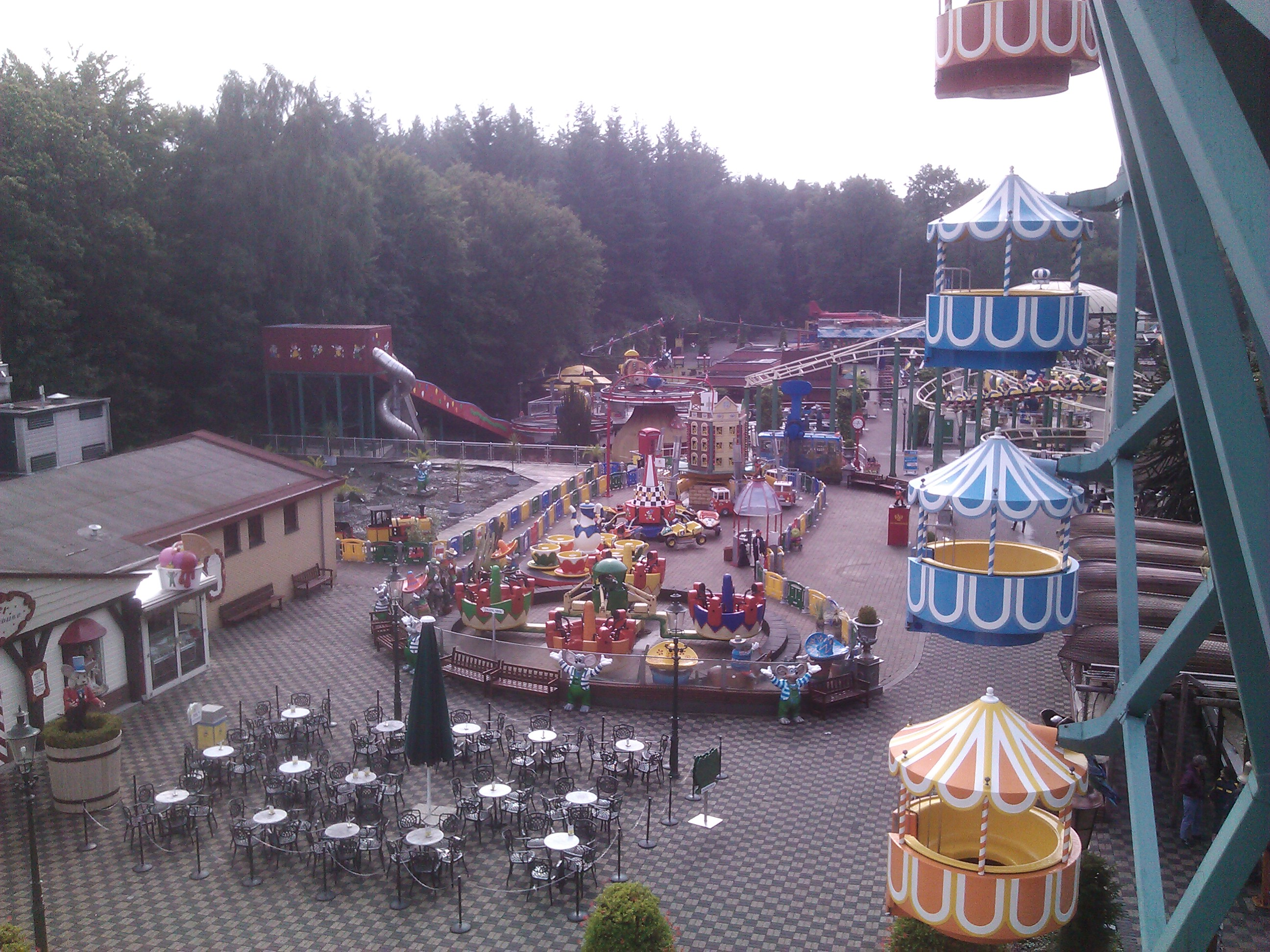
View of the main street
