= Jo Kluin =

Dutch footballer

Personal information
- Date of birth: 13 May 1904
- Date of death: 14 April 1977 (aged 72)

International career
Years	Team	Apps	(Gls)
1928	Netherlands	1	(0)

Jo Kluin (13 May 1904 – 14 April 1977) was a Dutch footballer. He played in one match for the Netherlands national football team in 1928.
