= Damasceno =

Damasceno is a Portuguese surname.

Notable people with this surname include:

- Darlan Bispo Damasceno (born 1994), Brazilian footballer
- José Damasceno (born 1970), Mexican-Brazilian footballer
- Leônidas Soares Damasceno (born 1995), Brazilian footballer
- Marco Damasceno (born 1996), Brazilian footballer
- Murilo Damasceno Neto, Brazilian footballer
- Raymundo Damasceno Assis (born 1937), Brazilian cardinal
- Solange Damasceno (born 1953), Brazilian comedian

== See also ==
- Damascone
