= Apenheul Primate Park =

Ape and monkey focused zoo in Apeldoorn, Netherlands

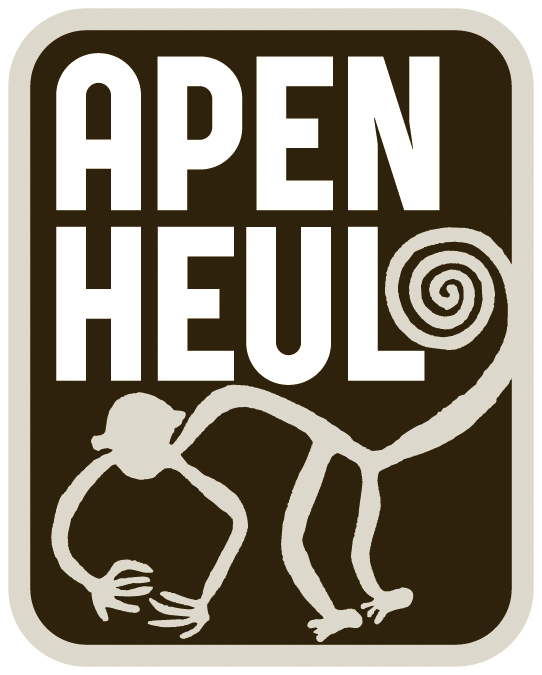

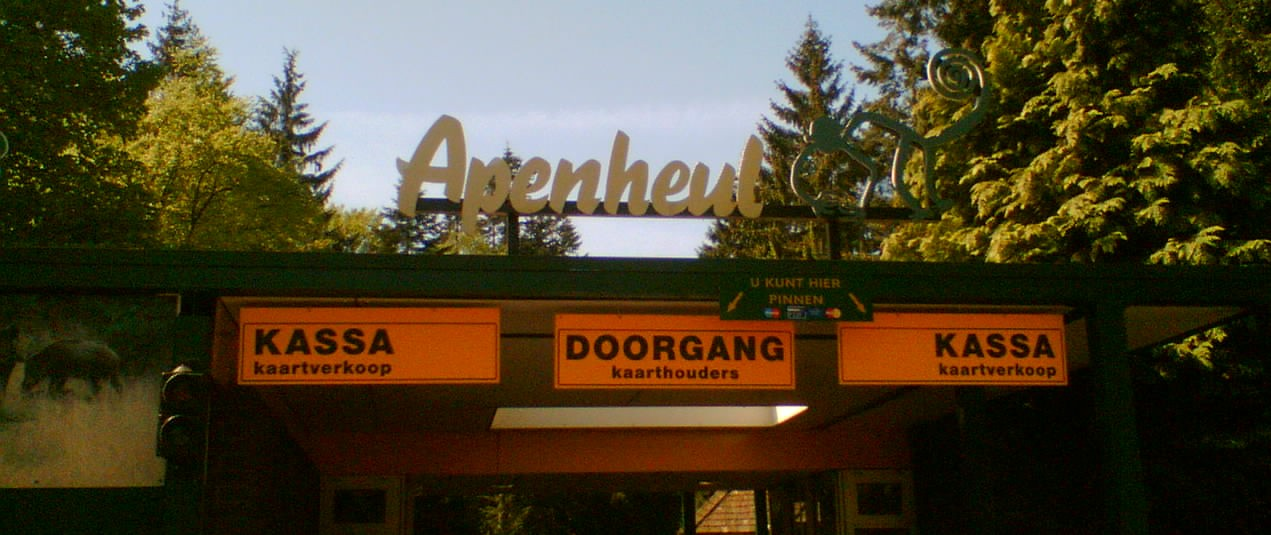
- Entrance
- Interactive map of Apenheul Primate Park
- 52.21367°N 5.92459°E
- Date opened: 1971
- Location: Apeldoorn, Netherlands
- No. of species: About 70
- Memberships: NVD, EAZA, WAZA
- Website: www.apenheul.com

Apenheul Primate Park is a zoo in Apeldoorn, Netherlands. It specializes in apes and monkeys. It opened in 1971 and was the first zoo in the world where monkeys could walk around freely in the forest and between the visitors. It started with just a few species, now it displays more than 30 different primates, among them are the bonobo, gorilla and orangutan.

== History ==
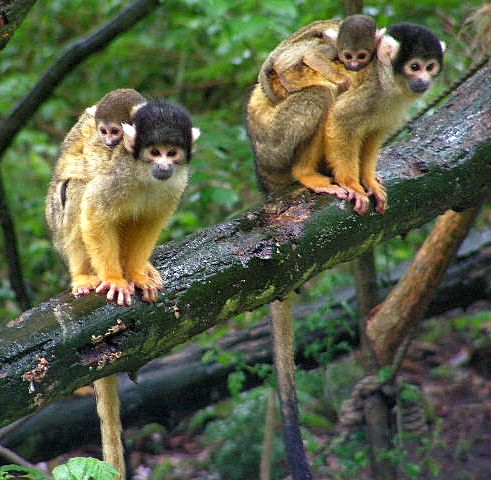
Black-capped squirrel monkeys

Apenheul Primate Park was conceptualised by photographer Wim Mager in the 1960s, when it was legal for private citizens to own monkeys. Mager, who himself had several monkeys as pets, believed both humans and primates would benefit from housing the animals in a more natural forest-like environment. He created the apen-heul (from apen meaning monkeys, and heul, an old Dutch word for a safe haven).

Apenheul Primate Park opened in 1971 as a small but revolutionary park housing wool-monkeys and other species. It is located in the nature park of Berg en Bos (Mountain and Wood) and proved popular with visitors and primatologists alike, leading to subsequent expansions. In 1976, gorillas were introduced to Apenheul Primate Park, with the first gorilla baby being born three years later. This was only the second healthy baby that was born in captivity in the Netherlands and the third in the entire world. The baby was raised by its own mother, which remains a rare event.

A major setback occurred in 1981 when the cabin in which Apenheul Primate Park burned to the ground, killing 46 monkeys. The building was subsequently replaced.

== See also ==
- La Vallée des Singes
